= Faith (British TV series) =

- Genre: Political drama Thriller
- Created by: Simon Burke
- Written by: Simon Burke
- Directed by: John Strickland
- Starring: Michael Gambon; Susannah Harker; John Hannah; Amelia Bullmore; Nicholas Gleaves; Keith Allen
- Ending theme: "Crazy" by Seal
- Composer: John Keane
- Country of origin: United Kingdom
- Original language: English
- No. of series: 1
- No. of episodes: 2

Production
- Executive producer: Ted Childs
- Producer: Colin McKeown
- Production locations: London, England, UK
- Cinematography: Peter Fearon
- Editor: John Parker
- Running time: 100 minutes
- Production company: Central Independent Television

Original release
- Network: ITV
- Release: 7 September – 8 September 1994

Faith is a two-part British thriller political drama series written by Simon Burke and directed by John Strickland, first broadcast on ITV between 7 and 8 September 1994. The programme stars Michael Gambon as Peter Moreton, Susannah Harker as Holly Moreton and John Hannah as Nick Simon. The programme was broadcast over two consecutive nights for Wednesday and Thursday. This miniseries was produced by Central Independent Television for the ITV network.

== Plot ==
Peter Moreton, a high-ranking government official, scrambles to keep his secret style hidden from the world when his daughter purposely leaks his affair to a reporter she is dating. Nick Simon is the high-level reporter caught between his love for Holly Moreton, the daughter of Peter Moreton and his desperation to keep his job and land the biggest story of his career.

== Cast ==
- Michael Gambon as Peter Moreton
- John Hannah as Nick Simon
- Susannah Harker as Holly Moreton
- Amelia Bullmore as Ros
- Nicholas Gleaves as Andy Morgan
- Keith Allen as Jeff Wagland
- Connie Booth as Pat Harbinson
- Jeremy Bulloch as David Reckitt
- Fraser James as Steve Maher
- Grace Boyle as Faith Simon
- Gemma Jones as Jane Moreton
- Ken Livingstone as Himself
- Struan Rodger as Matthew Sheridan
- Robin Weaver as Helena Reckitt
- Carole Nimmons as Gillian Reckitt
- Louis Mahoney as Dr. Jacques
- Nicola Walker as Sallie Grace

== Episodes ==
No. overall	No. in series	Title	Directed by	Written by	Original release date
1	1	"Part 1"	John Strickland	Simon Burke	7 September 1994
Nick Simon (John Hannah), a journalist for a Sunday newspaper, is struggling to bring his up his daughter, Faith (Grace Boyle), and keep his job. Enticed out on a blind date, he meets and falls for Holly Moreton (Susannah Harker), daughter of Tory MP, Peter Moreton (Michael Gambon). Moreton's name is linked with a Government scandal concerning illegal arms sales, and Nick discovers there is a further scoop to be investigated, but it may damage his relationship with Holly.
2	2	"Part 2"	John Strickland	Simon Burke	8 September 1994
Now jobless, broke and alone. Nick Simon is still no closer to obtaining proof of Moreton's illicit affair. But flickering through photos of the weekend, he and Holly spent together at Moreton's country cottage, the true identity of Moreton's lover suddenly becomes clear.

== Home media ==
Faith was released on DVD in United States on November 8, 2005 by Koch Vision.
