= Caroline Harker =

English actress (born 1966)

- Born: Caroline Anne Owens; 1966 (age 59–60); London, England
- Occupation: Actress
- Years active: 1990–present
- Spouse: Anthony Calf
- Children: 3
- Mother: Polly Adams
- Relatives: Susannah Harker (sister); Joseph Harker (great-great-grandfather)

Caroline Anne Owens (born 1966), known professionally as Caroline Harker, is an English actress. She has appeared in British television series including A Touch of Frost, Holding On, Keeping Mum and Doctors. In 2025, she joined the cast of the ITV1 soap opera Emmerdale as Dr. Caitlin Todd.

== Early life ==
Harker was born in London, a daughter of actress Polly Adams and actor Richard Owens. She and her sisters, Nelly and Susannah, were brought up as Catholics and educated at a "strict" independent convent boarding school run by nuns in Sussex, and at the Central School of Speech and Drama in north London. Harker and her sisters descend from theatrical designer Joseph Harker.

== Career ==
Harker is known for her roles as Celia in the BBC's Middlemarch, and as Woman Police Constable (WPC) (later Detective Sgt.) Hazel Wallace in the ITV police drama A Touch of Frost (1992–2003). She also played Alicia Davenport in Coronation Street for four episodes in 2012.

Harker played the role of "Mother" in the Mike Kenny's adaptation of The Railway Children, directed by Damian Cruden and staged at the Waterloo International railway station. Harker is married to fellow actor Anthony Calf, with whom she appeared in The Madness of King George and in a TV adaptation of Jilly Cooper's Riders They have three daughters.

From January 2023, Harker starred as Clairee in a production of Steel Magnolias at the Richmond Theatre, London. Harker appeared alongside Lucy Speed, Diana Vickers, and Elizabeth Ayodele. The production, going on to tour the UK, was rated 2/5 stars by What's on Stage. In January 2025, Harker debuted as Dr. Caitlin Todd in the ITV soap opera Emmerdale. She initially appeared as a minor character in early 2025, before being reintroduced in 2026 as part of a prominent storyline involving her character being a workplace bully.

== Filmography ==
=== Film ===
Year	Title	Role	Notes
1994	The Madness of King George	Mrs Fitzherbert	
1999	Een vrouw van het noorden	Charlotte	
2007	Lady Godiva: Back in the Saddle	Catherine Osbourne	
2020	The Croft	Suzanne	
2021	Mothering Sunday	Sylvia Hobday	

=== Television ===
Year	Title	Role	Notes
1990	Casualty	Helen Bradley / Tessa	2 episodes
1992–2003	A Touch of Frost	W.P.C. Hazel Wallace	11 episodes
1993	Riders	Tory Lovell	Television film
1994	Middlemarch	Celia Brooke	7 episodes
1994	Honey for Tea	Lucy Courtney	7 episodes
1997	Holding On	Vicky	8 episodes
1997–1998	Keeping Mum	Wendy	3 episodes
1998	Kavanagh QC	Rowena Featherstonehaugh	1 episode
2002	Midsomer Murders	Tamsin Proctor	Episode: "Market For Murder"
2003	Foyle's War	Jane Hardiman	1 episode
2004	Auf Wiedersehen, Pet	Pru Scott-Johns	5 episodes
2004	Murder in Suburbia	Tessa Northover	1 episode
2007	The Man Who Lost His Head	Fiona Harrison	TV movie
2007	Hana's Helpline	Betty	6 episodes
2010	Doctors	Claire Jarrett	Episode: "Widow-to-Be"
2011	New Tricks	Tabitha Hall-Chalmers	Episode: "Tiger Tiger"
2012	Coronation Street	Alicia Davenport	4 episodes
2012	Holby City	Imogen White	Episode: "Here and Now"
2012	Doctors	Elaine Stainton	Episode: "Who's Coming to Dinner?"
2016	Doctors	Caroline Vossman	Episode: "Across Time"
2021	Toast of Tinseltown	Sue Pipkins	Series 1 episode 1: Anger Man
2022	Ten Percent	Casting director	Series 1 episode 8
2023	The Chemistry of Death	Janine Spink	2 episodes
2023	Slow Horses	Doctor's Receptionist	Episode: "Strange Games"
2024	Joan	Mrs Taylor-Brown	1 episode
2024	Say Nothing	Radio Journalist (voice)	Episode: "Do No Harm"
2024	The Agency	Chief of Staff	Episode: "Spy for Sale"
2025–2026	Emmerdale	Dr. Caitlin Todd	Regular role
2025	The Stolen Girl	Bethany Hastings	1 episode
2026	Hijack	Julia	2 episodes
