= Hardcore =

Hardcore, hard core or hard-core may refer to:

== Arts and media ==
=== Film ===
- Hardcore (1977 film), a British comedy film
- Hardcore (1979 film), an American crime drama film starring George C. Scott
- Hardcore (2001 film), a British documentary film directed by Stephen Walker
- Hardcore (2004 film), a Greek drama film directed by Dennis Iliadis
- Hardcore Henry, a Russian first-person action adventure/sci-fi film directed by Ilya Naishuller of the band Biting Elbows

=== Music ===
==== Genres ====
- Breakbeat hardcore, related to raves and hip-hop
- Digital hardcore, a fusion of hardcore punk and electronic dance music
- Gabber, a style of electronic dance music
- Hardcore dancing, a style of dance related to moshing, sometimes performed at hardcore punk shows
- Hardcore (electronic dance music genre)
  - Early hardcore
  - Happy hardcore
  - Mainstream hardcore
- Hardcore hip hop
- Hardcore punk
  - Beatdown hardcore
  - harDCore, a portmanteau abbreviation for hardcore punk music in Washington, D.C.
  - List of hardcore punk subgenres

==== Albums ====
- Hardcore (Daddy Freddy album), 2004
- Hard Core (Paul Dean album), 1989
- Hard Core (Lil' Kim album), 1996
- Hard Core (Lil' Kim mixtape), 2014
- Hardcore '81, a 1981 album by D.O.A.

==== Songs ====
- "Hardcore" (song), a 2022 song by Tove Styrke
- "This Is Hardcore", a song by Pulp

=== Video games ===
- Hardcore mode, also permadeath, a video game mechanic which does not allow a dead character to be restored
- Hardcore (video game), original name of the 1994 game Ultracore

=== Visual media ===
- Hardcore pornography, a form of explicit pornography
- Hardcore (comics), a fictional character in the Marvel Multiverse

=== Wrestling ===
- Hardcore wrestling, a form of professional wrestling
- Hardcore Holly, the ring name of American professional wrestler Robert Howard (born 1963)

== Technology ==
- Construction aggregate, often referred to as "hardcore"
- Hard core, a type of semiconductor intellectual property core
- Hard-core predicate, a concept in cryptography

== See also ==
- Hard Corps (disambiguation)
