= Joe Ahearne =

British television writer and director (born 1962)

- Born: October 1962 (age 64)
- Occupation: Director • writer

Joe Ahearne (born 1962) is a British television writer and director, best known for his work on several fantasy and science fiction based programmes including Ultraviolet, Apparitions and Doctor Who. He also wrote the screenplay for 2013 feature film Trance.

== Career ==
Ahearne's career began when the short film Latin for a Dark Room won an award at the Edinburgh Festival in 1994, and shortly afterwards he began working for the independent television production company World Productions. Among his work for World Productions were episodes of the 1997 BBC Two drama series This Life, of which Ahearne wrote two and directed another three episodes, making him the only person to both write and direct episodes for the series.

His next major production for World Productions was the 1998 Channel Four vampire television series Ultraviolet, a six episode series which Ahearne both wrote and directed. Ultraviolet was broadcast in to critical acclaim, and has subsequently been released on both VHS and DVD. The series also ran on the Sci-Fi Channel in the United States. The Fox Network in the U.S. produced a pilot for an American version of the show in 2001, though this did not lead to a series.

In 2002, Ahearne directed the pilot for the Big Bear Productions produced, BBC One horror-fantasy television drama Strange, written by Andrew Marshall. The pilot was successful enough for a series to be commissioned the following year, with Ahearne helming three of the six episodes, although the series was not a success and a second series did not follow.

Ahearne both wrote and directed the two-part drama-documentary series Space Odyssey: Voyage to the Planets for the BBC and the Discovery Channel in 2004.

He was also the director of five episodes of the 2005 series of the BBC's Doctor Who, for which Ahearne was nominated for his first BAFTA Award.

In December 2006, Ahearne's drama Perfect Parents, starring Doctor Who lead Christopher Eccleston, was aired on ITV1. The following month Ahearne returned to This Life to direct the one-off reunion episode "This Life +10", shown on BBC Two on 2 January 2007.

Ahearne's wrote and directed the six episode supernatural series for the BBC Apparitions, which aired on BBC One in November and December, 2008. He also worked on Da Vinci's Demons, a historically-set TV series created by David S. Goyer for Starz and BBC Worldwide.

He also wrote the four-issue Fantastic Force limited series for Marvel Comics in 2009 and Fantastic Four Annual 32 in 2010.

In 2013, Ahearne co-wrote the screenplay for the psychological thriller film Trance, directed by Danny Boyle and starring James McAvoy, which was partially a remake of Ahearne's own version of the story, made for British television in 2001. He had sent the script to Boyle in 1994 after the release of 1994's Shallow Grave. Boyle never forgot it, and over a decade later contacted Ahearne with the intention of making a feature film. It went on to receive mostly positive reviews.

In 2017 Ahearne wrote and directed the BBC One thriller mini-series The Replacement. The series consisted of three episodes, and lacked a conclusive ending. Ahearne did not intend to continue the series as he preferred short series.

Ahearne's next project was the "gay thriller" B&B, produced by Hummingbird Films and starring Doctor Who actor Paul McGann. B&B premiered at the 2017 London Independent Film Festival, where it was named the Best LGBT Picture. It played at numerous other festivals and received a limited theatrical release in the fall of 2017 in North America.

In 2017, Ahearne was announced as writer, director, and executive producer for the anthology series Rendlesham, based on the UFO sighting in Rendlesham Forest in 1980. The series was to star Laurence Fishburne, also serving as executive producer. As of June 2026, however, the series has not been filmed.
