= Element of Doubt =

- Genre: Crime thriller
- Screenplay by: David Pirie
- Directed by: Christopher Morahan
- Starring: Nigel Havers; Gina McKee; Judy Parfitt; Michael Jayston; Polly Adams; Mary Woodvine
- Music by: Stephen Warbeck
- Country of origin: United Kingdom
- Original language: English

Production
- Executive producer: Jonathan Powell
- Producers: Sue Bennett-Urwin; Michael Whitehall
- Cinematography: Brian Tufano
- Editor: Ardan Fisher
- Camera setup: Single camera
- Running time: 100 minutes
- Production companies: Havahall Pictures; Carlton Television

Original release
- Network: ITV
- Release: 30 December 1996

Element of Doubt is a 1996 British thriller television film directed by Christopher Morahan and starring Gina McKee and Nigel Havers.

== Plot ==
A seemingly perfect couple begin to dispute when they should have children and their relationship rapidly deteriorates until she is afraid he might kill her.

== Cast ==
- Nigel Havers - Richard
- Gina McKee - Beth
- Judy Parfitt - Genevieve
- Michael Jayston - Kirk
- Polly Adams - Ellen
- Mary Woodvine - Lucy
- Robert Reynolds - Nat
- Helen Anderson - Teacher
- Christopher Baines - Peter
- Sarah Berger - Mary Harper
- Hilary Gish - Estate Agent
- Denis Lill - Simon
- Alex Linstead - Pharmacist
- Patrick McGrady - Policeman
