= Sob Sisters =

- Genre: Sitcom
- Written by: Andrew Marshall
- Directed by: Ray Butt
- Starring: Gwen Taylor; Polly Adams
- Country of origin: United Kingdom
- Original language: English
- No. of series: 1
- No. of episodes: 7

Production
- Running time: 30 minutes
- Production company: Central Independent Television

Original release
- Network: ITV
- Release: 26 May – 7 July 1989

Sob Sisters is a British television sitcom which aired on ITV in 1989. Following the death of a husband, two sisters move in together despite their strongly contrasting personalities.

Other actors who appeared in episodes of the series include Mark Kingston, Maxine Audley, Jeillo Edwards, Jennifer Croxton, Sue Holderness and Tim Barrett.

== Main cast ==
- Gwen Taylor as Liz
- Polly Adams as Dorothy
- Freddie Jones as Leo
- Philip Bird as Charlie
- Beryl Cooke as Edna

== Episodes ==
No.	Title	Original release date
1	"I Don't Think We're in Kansas Anymore"	26 May 1989
2	"Close to the Edge"	2 June 1989
3	"She Wore the Dress, While I Stayed Home"	9 June 1989
4	"Who Was That Gentleman I Saw You with Last Night?"	16 June 1989
5	"Streetwise"	23 June 1989
6	"A Night at the Opera"	30 June 1989
7	"We Need a Little Christmas"	7 July 1989

== Bibliography ==
- Perry, Christopher (2015), The British Television Pilot Episodes Research Guide 1936–2015
