= Hardcore (2001 film) =

2001 British documentary film by Stephen Walker

- Directed by: Stephen Walker
- Produced by: Stephen Walker; Rod Caird; Tessa Gogol; Stephen Lambert; Richard Sattin
- Starring: Robert Black; David Christopher; Mark Handel; Max Hardcore; Brandon Iron; Layla Jade; Joel Lawrence; Mr. Marcus; Lee-anne McQueen; Dick Nasty; Kyle Phillips; Caroline Pierce; Michael Stefano; Steve Taylor; Valentino
- Cinematography: Richard Ranken
- Edited by: Chris King
- Music by: Richard Attree
- Release date: 7 April 2001
- Country: United Kingdom
- Language: English

Hardcore is a 2001 British documentary film about the pornographic film industry directed by Stephen Walker. The film's music was composed by Richard Attree.

The film focused on pornographic actors and directors Rob Zicari, David Christopher, Mark Handel, Max Hardcore, Brandon Iron and Mr. Marcus and the perspectives of actresses in the industry.

== Cast ==
- Robert Black
- David Christopher
- Mark Handel
- Max Hardcore
- Brandon Iron
- Layla Jade
- Joel Lawrence
- Mr. Marcus
- Lee-anne McQueen
- Dick Nasty
- Kyle Phillips
- Caroline Pierce
- Michael Stefano
- Steve Taylor
- Valentino
