= Tom Brodie (actor) =

English actor

Tom Brodie (born 1978) is an English actor, who first appeared on British television screens as a young boy, and remained active into his early 20s.

== Regular TV appearances ==
- Watt on Earth, 1991–1992, as Sean Ruddock.
- Chris Cross, 1993, as Mookie.
- The Vet, 1996, as Steven Holt.
- Kavanagh QC, 1995–1999, as Matt Kavanagh.
