= Heat of the Sun =

British television series

- DVD cover
- Genre: Crime drama; Adventure; Period drama
- Created by: Russell Lewis; Timothy Prager
- Directed by: Diarmuid Lawrence; Paul Seed; Adrian Shergold
- Starring: Trevor Eve; Susannah Harker; Michael Byrne; Julian Rhind-Tutt; Freddie Annobil-Dodoo; David Horovitch; Sean Gallagher; Shaheen Jassat; Cathryn Harrison
- Composer: Nick Bicât
- Country of origin: United Kingdom
- Original language: English
- No. of seasons: 1
- No. of episodes: 3

Production
- Executive producers: Ted Childs; Rebecca Eaton
- Producer: Ann Tricklebank
- Production location: Zimbabwe
- Cinematography: Ken Brinsley
- Editor: McDonald Brown
- Running time: 100 minutes
- Production companies: Carlton Television; WGBH

Original release
- Network: ITV
- Release: 28 January – 11 February 1998

Heat of the Sun is a British television crime drama series, created by Russell Lewis and Timothy Prager, that first aired on ITV on 28 January 1998. Set in 1930s Kenya, the series stars Trevor Eve as Superintendent Albert Tyburn, a Scotland Yard criminal investigations officer who is sent to work in Nairobi to reveal the underside of the expatriate community in Kenya, exploring murders against issue of race and class, drug use, and sexuality. Susannah Harker stars as his romantic interest, Emma Fitzgerald, an aviator who is modelled on Beryl Markham. The series was a joint production between Carlton Productions and WGBH Boston.

The series was shot on location in Zimbabwe, with Ted Childs (Carlton) and Rebecca Eaton (WGBH) acting as executive producers. Ann Tricklebank (Carlton) served as series producer. Russell Lewis penned the episodes Private Lives, and The Sport of Kings, while fellow creator Timothy Prager penned the episode Hide in Plain Sight. Adrian Shergold directed Private Lives, Diarmuid Lawrence directed Hide in Plain Sight, and Paul Seed directed The Sport of Kings.

In the United States, the series aired on PBS as part of their Mystery! anthology strand. Hide in Plain Sight and The Sport of Kings were each split into two parts, bringing the US broadcast to five episodes in total. The complete series was released on Region 2 DVD in the United Kingdom on 6 July 2009.

== Cast ==
- Trevor Eve as Supt. Albert Tyburn
- Susannah Harker as Emma Fitzgerald
- Michael Byrne as Police Comm. Ronald Burkitt
- Julian Rhind-Tutt as Asst. Supt. James Valentine
- Freddie Annobil-Dodoo as Cpl. Jonah Karinde
- David Horovitch as Dr. Emil Mueller
- Sean Gallagher as Chico de Ville
- Shaheen Jassat as Sub Inspector Singh
- Cathryn Harrison as Charlotte Elliott
- Paul Brooke as Sir Rex Willoughby

== Episodes ==
No.	Title	Directed by	Written by	Original release date
1	"Private Lives"	Adrian Shergold	Russell Lewis	28 January 1998
After shooting a child killer who was deemed untouchable, Scotland Yard's Albert Tyburn (Trevor Eve) is sent to 1930s Kenya to head a new criminal division of the small police force in Nairobi. He investigates the death of Lady Daphne Ellesmere (Kate McKenzie) as a murder, although his boss Commissioner Burkitt (Michael Byrne) and the coroner insist her death by lion attack was an accident. Helping him is Daphne's sister Emma Fitzgerald (Susannah Harker), an attractive and independent woman who has become a bush pilot and refuses to play the social games common in the British expatriate set.
2	"Hide in Plain Sight"	Diarmuid Lawrence	Timothy Prager	4 February 1998
Tyburn and his new assistant, Valentine (Julian Rhind-Tutt), investigate the murder of a native woman and a reported Native attack on a local mission. Meanwhile, Burkitt orders Tyburn to arrest all the native prostitutes, to get them off the street before the expected visit by Edward, the Prince of Wales; Tyburn struggles to house them all.
3	"The Sport of Kings"	Paul Seed	Russell Lewis	11 February 1998
After defeating a charge of murdering a young African man who worked for him and losing an important horse race, wealthy and powerful Max Van der Vuurst (Joss Ackland) is found dead in what appears to be an accidental fire at his house. Tyburn has to work with colonial troops to rescue a town besieged by raiders in order to collar their prime suspect.
