= Chancer =

British crime drama

- Genre: Crime drama
- Created by: Guy Andrews
- Written by: Guy Andrews; Simon Burke; Tony Grounds
- Directed by: Alan Grint; Laurence Moody
- Starring: Clive Owen; Simon Shepherd; Susannah Harker; Leslie Phillips; Peter Vaughan; Ralph Riach; Caroline Langrishe; Benjamin Whitrow; Lynsey Baxter; Matthew Marsh; Stephen Tompkinson
- Composer: Jan Hammer
- Country of origin: United Kingdom
- Original language: English
- No. of series: 2
- No. of episodes: 20

Production
- Executive producer: Ted Childs
- Producer: Sarah Wilson
- Cinematography: Colin Munn
- Editor: Mike Mulliner
- Running time: 50 minutes
- Production company: Central Independent Television

Original release
- Network: ITV
- Release: 6 March 1990 – 4 June 1991

Chancer is a British television crime drama serial, produced by Central Independent Television for ITV, that first broadcast on 6 March 1990. Starring Clive Owen in the title role of Stephen Crane, Chancer tells the story of a likable conman and rogue at the end of the yuppie 1980s. The first series concerns Crane's attempts to save an ailing car firm, which at first seem to be straightforward, until he is forced to reconcile himself with his past. In the second series, Crane, now using his real name of Derek Love, assists his friend Piers, who has inherited a stately home, and with it, a financial nightmare.

The series boasted a high-profile cast, including Simon Shepherd, Susannah Harker, Leslie Phillips and Peter Vaughan in leading roles. Notably, Christopher Eccleston also had one of his first television roles, featuring in the opening episode of series two as a prison inmate. Across the two series, a total of twenty episodes were broadcast, with both series airing on Tuesdays at 21:00. The theme music for the series was written by Jan Hammer. In 1991, Hammer's Miami Vice soundtrack "Crockett's Theme" was re-released with his Chancer theme tune as a double A-side, after the former featured in a series of NatWest adverts. The release charted at No. 47 on the UK Singles Chart.

Both series have since been released on DVD via Network, with a complete box set first issued on 4 October 2004.

== Cast ==
- Clive Owen as Derek Love / Stephen Crane
- Simon Shepherd as Piers Garfield-Ward
- Susannah Harker as Joanna Franklyn
- Leslie Phillips as James Xavier 'Jimmy' Blake
- Peter Vaughan as Thomas 'Tom' Franklyn
- Ralph Riach as Willy Stebbings

=== Series 1 (1990) ===
- Caroline Langrishe as Penny Nichols
- Benjamin Whitrow as Robert Douglas
- Lynsey Baxter as Victoria Douglas
- Matthew Marsh as Gavin Nichols
- Stephen Tompkinson as Markus Worton
- Cliff Parisi as Lunchbox
- Robert Glenister as Colin Morris
- Andy Linden as Dink
- Paul Barber as Gerald
- Maureen Glackin as Lorraine
- Karen Archer as Vanessa
- Sam London as Tom Nichols
- Cathryn Bradshaw as Sonya Morris
- Sean Pertwee as Jamie Douglas
- Nicholas Shelton as Richard Nichols

=== Series 2 (1991) ===
- Louise Lombard as Anna
- Jennie Linden as Olivia
- Tom Tudgay as Joseph Franklyn
- Ella Wilder as Ella
- Derek Fowlds as Michael Coley

== Episodes ==
=== Series 1 (1990) ===
No. overall	No. in series	Title	Directed by	Written by	Original release date
1	1	"Weapons from the Wall"	Alan Grint	Guy Andrews	6 March 1990
When the Douglas Motors factory is destroyed in a suspected arson attack, Gavin Nichols, son-in-law of managing director Robert Douglas, calls upon an old friend for help.
2	2	"Killing Floor"	Alan Grint	Guy Andrews	13 March 1990
Crane attempts to save Douglas Motors by stealing half a million pounds from his boss in an insider trading scam, while Robert hires a private detective to look for Jamie.
3	3	"Hazard"	Alan Grint	Guy Andrews	20 March 1990
Crane tries to secure himself a job with Douglas Motors after both he and Jo are sacked from the bank.
4	4	"Trust"	Alan Grint	Tony Grounds	27 March 1990
Desperate to get his money back, Blake takes revenge on Crane by spilling the beans about his past to Robert. Meanwhile, Tom is also out for revenge.
5	5	"Pretenders"	Laurence Moody	Simon Burke	3 April 1990
Crane discovers that Douglas Motors has been the victim of a scam operated by Fitchford, Lunchbox and Gerald. An absent Jamie returns home after two years in the French Foreign Legion.
6	6	"Possessions"	Laurence Moody	Guy Andrews	10 April 1990
Robert is forced to come clean to Crane after using the money from the bank to pay off Jamie's gambling debts. Jo begins an affair with Piers behind Crane's back.
7	7	"Faith"	Laurence Moody	Guy Andrews	17 April 1990
Victoria talks Crane into a dangerous scam to ruin a property developer. Meanwhile, the residents of Stoneleigh are unhappy about a planned toxic waste dump orchestrated by Robert.
8	8	"Lies"	Alan Grint	Guy Andrews	24 April 1990
Tom returns from Hong Kong, desperate to catch up with Crane for a few choice words. But when Crane surrenders to his demands, Tom is taken aback, resulting in a surprising offer.
9	9	"Wreckage"	Alan Grint	Simon Burke	1 May 1990
The arrival of Crane's brother sparks concern for his position at the company, while Jamie's suicide throws up a number of interesting questions.
10	10	"Sanctuary"	Alan Grint	Guy Andrews	8 May 1990
Tom secures control of Douglas Motors, while Blake plans to settle some old scores in time for his retirement – unaware that Crane will soon become an unlikely ally.
11	11	"History"	Alan Grint	Guy Andrews	15 May 1990
Crane revisits his past when he receives news of an unexpected death.
12	12	"Temptation"	Alan Grint	Simon Burke	22 May 1990
The death of the real Stephen Crane threatens to blow Crane's cover, while Tom offers to leave Douglas Motors alone in return for Crane's help.
13	13	"Love"	Alan Grint	Guy Andrews	29 May 1990
Crane ensures the survival of Douglas Motors by winning a dangerous bet with Tom, but little is he prepared to suffer the consequences.

=== Series 2 (1991) ===
No. overall	No. in series	Title	Directed by	Written by	Original release date
14	1	"Jo"	Alan Grint	Guy Andrews	23 April 1991
Crane, now out of prison, decides to make winning back Jo's affections his only goal.
15	2	"Ashes"	Alan Grint	Guy Andrews	30 April 1991
Devastated by Jo's death, Crane is manipulated by Tom after a letter from Jo regarding the paternity of her son mysteriously disappears. Blake continues in his attempts to track down Anna.
16	3	"Secrets"	Alan Grint	Guy Andrews	7 May 1991
Tom begins to suspect that Anna may have been involved in Jo's death. Crane offers to help Piers save Winterleigh after scamming Tom's casino out of a fortune.
17	4	"Remembrance"	Alan Grint	Simon Burke	14 May 1991
Anna, now on the run, declares her love for Crane. Meanwhile, having stolen membership records from Franklyn's gambling operation, Crane and Piers start up a gaming club at Winterleigh.
18	5	"Blood"	Alan Grint	Guy Andrews	21 May 1991
The letter confirming Joseph's paternity finds its way back into Crane's hands. But having already crossed paths with Piers over the gaming club, Crane finds his world is slowly crumbling around him.
19	6	"Fall"	Alan Grint	Simon Burke	28 May 1991
Tom offers Crane access to his son in return for accepting a job with him. Having discovered the secret gaming club at Winterleigh, Tom tries to make life difficult for Piers.
20	7	"Sacrifice"	Alan Grint	Guy Andrews	4 June 1991
Crane, now working for Franklyn's ailing 'Build British, Buy British' campaign, discovers his main weapon is to pour scorn on the bankers who refuse to back it.
