= Max Hardcore =

American pornographic actor (1956–2023)

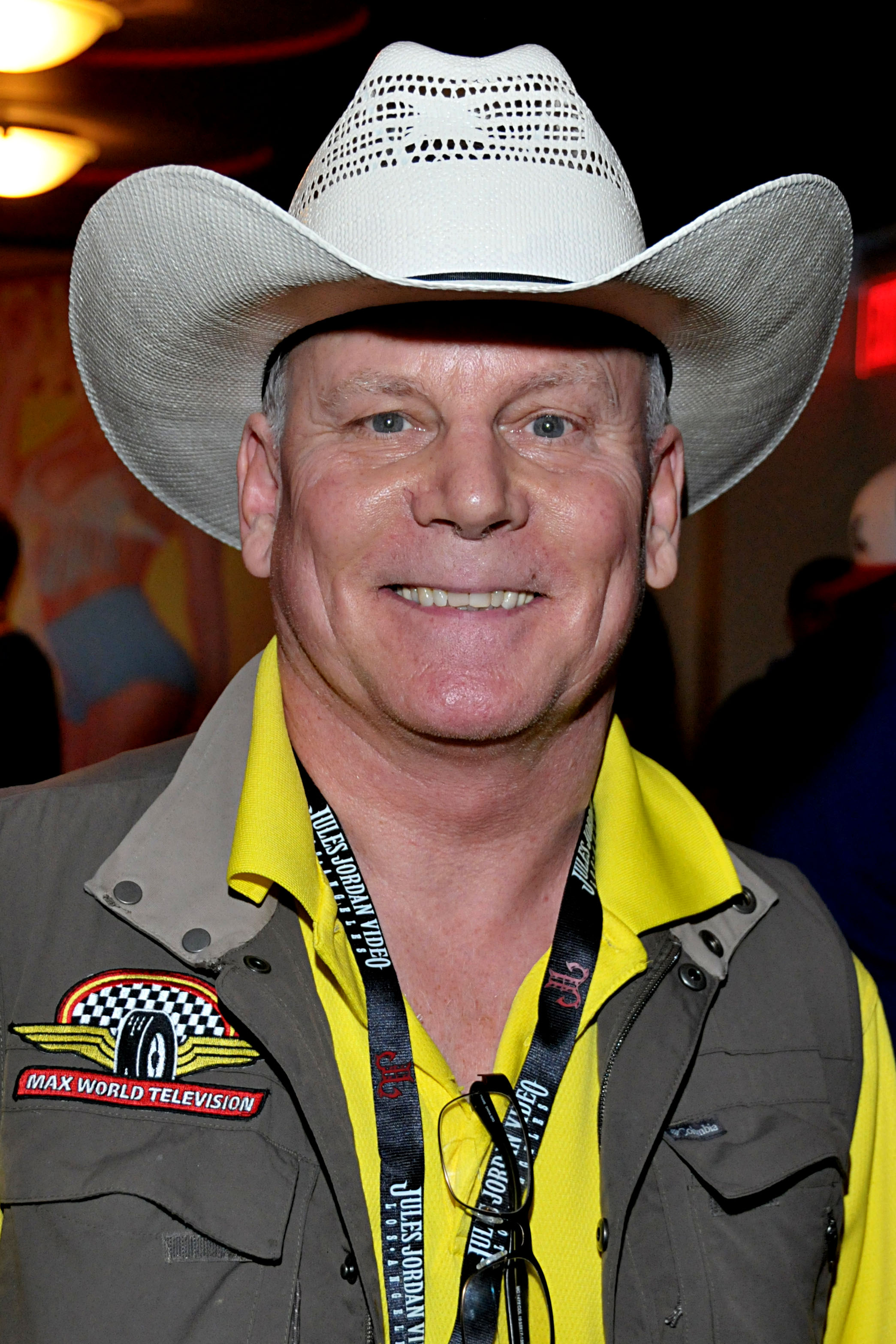
- Max Hardcore at the AVN Expo in Las Vegas, 2015
- Born: Paul F. Little; August 10, 1956; Racine, Wisconsin, U.S.
- Died: March 27, 2023 (aged 66); Los Angeles, California, U.S.
- Other names: Vince Hardcore; Paul Hardcore; Video Paul; Sam Smythe; Max Steiner; Rex Reamer
- Occupations: Pornographic actor; producer; director

Paul F. Little (August 10, 1956 – March 27, 2023) was an American pornographic actor, producer, and director better known by his stage name Max Hardcore. He rose to prominence in 1992 with the film series The Anal Adventures of Max Hardcore, which in 1994 was awarded the X-Rated Critics Organization's award for Best Amateur or Pro-Am series. Gerrie Lim, formerly a writer for AVN (Adult Video News) has classified Hardcore's works as gonzo pornography and "testing the limits of acceptability". He was a member of the X-Rated Critics Organization's Hall of Fame. He spent two and a half years in prison (2009–2011), following conviction in a trial for obscenity.

== Nature of content ==
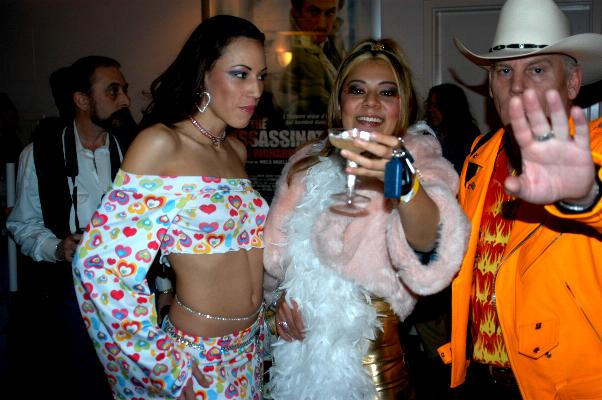
Max Hardcore with frequent co-stars Layla Rivera (left) and Catalina (middle)

Max Hardcore's films generally consist of sexual acts executed by himself, with women, often porn industry newcomers who act like young girls or their upset mothers.

The sexual situations depicted in Max Hardcore's films frequently include acts such as vomit, urinating on his female co-stars, fisting them, or inserting specula into their anuses or vaginas and widening them to extreme degree. Films by Max Hardcore often depict their director and star inflicting apparent pain and humiliation on his co-stars.

The treatment by Hardcore of his female co-stars has been described by several critics as occasionally abusive and the tone of Hardcore's work has been considered misogynistic. The crew of the British documentary Hardcore witnessed Hardcore's unsimulated violent treatment of a woman who had been reluctant to work with him, and interfered with the production "for fear of being complicit in her rape."

Max Hardcore's films and alleged work methods reportedly made him "among the most hated men in the industry".

== Prosecutions and post-prison ==
=== 1998 arrest and 2002 trial ===
Based on Max Extreme 4, the city of Los Angeles in 1998 charged him with child pornography and distribution of obscenity. That the actress was over the age of 18 was not disputed; charges were brought because the actress was portraying a character who was underage. Just before the case was brought to trial in 2002, the U.S. Supreme Court ruled (in Ashcroft v. Free Speech Coalition) that the statute prohibiting adults from portraying children in films and books was unconstitutional. Based on this ruling, the child pornography charges against Little were dismissed. The misdemeanor charge of distribution of obscenity was retained, but the jury failed to reach a verdict. An additional obscenity charge was subsequently levied against him by L.A., again resulting in a hung jury. Little commented after the trial that it "was a frivolous waste of public resources."

=== 2005 arrest and prison sentence ===
On October 5, 2005, while Little was in Barcelona to attend an international FICEB Erotic Expo, the offices of Max World Entertainment were raided by the FBI. Five video titles and the office's computer servers were seized, ostensibly for research toward a federal obscenity indictment or a charge related to the record-keeping law (18 U.S.C. 2257).

After the FBI raid, Little released the following statement:

Once again, the government is wasting tax dollars and otherwise invaluable law enforcement resources to try to force a minority view of morality on all of America. Five of my movies have been targeted by the Federal Prude Patrol. There is no indication of any crime to be alleged except obscenity. If indicted, I will fight to protect my liberty, as well as the liberty of consenting adults to watch other adults engage in lawful, consensual, pleasurable sexual action. Shame on the Bush Department of Justice. I am proud of the movies I make and proud of those who buy and sell those movies.

In 2007, Little and his company, Max World Entertainment, Inc., were indicted in Florida by the United States Department of Justice Child Exploitation and Obscenity Section with five counts of transporting obscene matter by use of an interactive computer service and five counts of mailing obscene matter, relating to five movies showing fisting, urination, and vomiting. Little was subsequently found guilty on all charges and sentenced to 46 months in prison. On appeal, the 11th Circuit Court of Appeals in Atlanta, Georgia upheld the conviction, ruling that materials published online can be judged by local community standards in Florida even though Hardcore did not live there or produce the materials there. Little began serving his sentence on January 29, 2009.

The jury ordered the internet domain www.MaxHardcore.com to be forfeited but declined to forfeit Little's house in Altadena, California.

Little was originally assigned to the Federal Metropolitan Correctional Facility in downtown Los Angeles, and then transferred to Federal Correctional Institution, La Tuna in Anthony, Texas, a low-security correctional facility for men. He served the final five months of his sentence under house arrest.

After release from prison, Little continued appearing in scenes using a strap-on dildo because his ability to maintain an erection was compromised following prostate surgery in 2015.

== Death ==
Little died on March 27, 2023, at the age of 66. According to his business partner, Little had finished chemotherapy for thyroid cancer when he was hospitalized with an infection in his throat that spread to other parts of his body, causing septic shock, pneumonia and organ failure.

== Awards ==
- 1994 Anal Adventures of Max Hardcore was the winner in the XRCO's category Best Amateur or Pro-Am Series.
- 1996 Max 8: The Fugitive was the winner in the XRCO's category Best Male-Female Scene.
- 2009 Admitted to XRCO's Hall of Fame, in the category "Outlaws of Porn".

== Popular culture ==
In 1997, Little had a cameo role in the mainstream comedy film Orgazmo as Award Show Presenter.

Little is a subject of the 1998 David Foster Wallace essay "Big Red Son", which analyzes the American pornographic industry of the 1990s. The essay is included in his collection Consider The Lobster.

Little was satirized as the character "Tex Porno" in the Grant Morrison comic "The Filth."

Little is interviewed in the 2023 web series Beyond Fantasy – Episode 3: "Hardcore".

Little (as Max Hardcore) is mentioned in the 2025 book Girl on Girl – How Pop Culture Turned Women Against Themselves written by journalist Sophie Gilbert in Chapter 6, titled Final Girl: Extreme Sex, Art, and Violence in Post-9/11 America.
