= Joseph Harker =

British scene painter and theatrical designer (1855–1927)

- At work on a scene for Three Little Maids in 1902
- Born: Joseph Cunningham Harker; 17 October 1855; Levenshulme, Manchester, England
- Died: 15 April 1927 (aged 71); Hampstead, London, England
- Burial place: Golders Green Crematorium
- Occupations: Scene painter and theatrical designer
- Spouse: Sarah Elizabeth Hall
- Children: Gordon Harker
- Relatives: Polly Adams (great-granddaughter); Susannah Harker and Caroline Harker (great-great-granddaughters)

Joseph Cunningham Harker (17 October 1855 – 15 April 1927) was an English scene painter and theatrical designer.

Bram Stoker co-opted his surname for the character of Jonathan Harker in his Gothic horror novel Dracula.

== Career ==
Harker was born in Levenshulme, Manchester, Lancashire on 17 October 1855 to Maria (née O'Connor) and William Pierpont Harker. Maria was from an Irish theatre family, and the couple were at the time performing at the Theatre Royal in Manchester.

Harker played child parts, including Fleance in William Shakespeare's Macbeth, before being apprenticed to his uncle's trade of scenery painting. Harker subsequently became a scene painter for a number of major English theatres.

While best known for his work at the Lyceum Theatre alongside Hawes Craven and William Telbin (1846–1931), he was also responsible for the complete scenery for Richard Wagner's Parsifal at Covent Garden; for A Life of Pleasure performed at the Theatre Royal on Drury Lane in September 1893 and then at the Prince's Theatre, Bristol, later in that same year, as well as for the musical Chu Chin Chow, which ran for a record-breaking five years in London's West End from 1916.

Harker died at the age of 71 on 15 April 1927 in Hampstead, north London, and was interred at Golders Green Crematorium.

== Studios ==
In 1905, Harker had a two-storey, open-plan studio constructed to his specifications on Queen's Row, a narrow street off Walworth Road in London. The painting studio continued to produce scenic designs for the West End and other UK theatres until the 1990s. it was then used to provide work space for freelance London-based artists and set designers. It was used to create David Hockney's celebrated backdrops for the Glyndebourne Festival Opera.

Many of its essential fixtures survived intact into the 21st century, with many of the original winches and pulleys in place, while on the mezzanine floor there were still the large movable frames used to supported Harker's large 40 feet (12 m) canvas backdrops. These were still being used by artists such as Sadeysa Greenaway-Bailey to create artworks.

Despite the building being Grade II listed in 1989, as an important and rare surviving example of a theatrical scene-painting workshop, the Southwark Council in early 2017 granted permission for the studios to be redeveloped into six luxury flats and an office unit. Prior to this decision the ground floor had been occupied by the trade counter for Flints Theatrical Chandlers, which sold paints, brushes and all of the other material required for the scenic arts. The artists who had been using the building had not realised that the redevelopment was happening until the planning application had already been granted. In response, a petition that gained more than 4,000 signatures was organized in 2017 requesting that the council change its decision.

== Personal life ==
Harker married Sarah Elizabeth Hall (1856–1927). Their son Gordon Harker, who was born in 1885, became a theatre and film character actor.

Joseph and Sarah's great-granddaughter Polly Adams was an actress, while three of their great-great-granddaughters, Nelly Harker, Susannah Harker and Caroline Harker, also became actresses.

== In popular culture ==
During the period that Harker was employed at the Lyceum Theatre it was managed by Bram Stoker, the author of Dracula. In his memoir Studio and Stage, Harker mentions Stoker announcing that he had named one of the leading characters, Jonathan Harker, after him (though at least one source claims the inspiration was Stoker's landlady Fanny Harker).

Harker was depicted as an enigmatic secondary character in Joseph O'Connor's 2019 novel Shadowplay. In the novel, Harker was a young woman who had disguised herself as a man in order to obtain the position of scene painter at the Lyceum Theatre.
