= Hard Corps =

Hard Corps may refer to:

- Hard Corps (English band), 1980's English electronic band
- The Hard Corps (Rap rock band), 1990s rap rock band
- H.A.R.D. Corps, 1992–96 comic series
- Contra: Hard Corps, 1994 video game
  - Hard Corps: Uprising, 2011 video game and prequel to the above
- The Hard Corps, 2006 film

== See also ==
- Hardcore (disambiguation)
