= Just William (1994 TV series) =

- Starring: Oliver Rokison
- Country of origin: United Kingdom
- Original language: English
- No. of series: 2
- No. of episodes: 12

Production
- Running time: 30 min.

Original release
- Network: BBC One
- Release: 13 November 1994 – 17 December 1995

Just William is a British television series based on the Just William series of books written by Richmal Crompton. It ran for two series from 1994 to 1995 on BBC. The series starred Oliver Rokison as William and Jonathan Hirst as Ginger.

== Cast ==
- Oliver Rokison as William
- Jonathan Hirst as Ginger
- Stephen Wilmot as Henry
- Alastair Weller as Douglas
- Tiffany Griffiths as Violet Elizabeth Bott
- Polly Adams as Mrs. Brown
- David Horovitch as Mr. Brown
- Rebecca Johnson as Ethel Brown
- Ben Pullen as Robert Brown
- Naomi Allisstone as Ellen the Maid

== Episodes ==
=== Series One ===
The first series consisted of six episodes.

1. "William and the Russian Prince"
2. "William's Busy Day"
3. "William – The Great Actor"
4. "William and the White Elephants"
5. "Finding a School for William"
6. "William's Birthday"

=== Series Two ===
The second series also consisted of six episodes.

1. "William Clears The Slums"
2. "Parrots for Ethel"
3. "Boys Will Be Boys"
4. "William and the Ebony Hair Brush"
5. "William and the Old Man in the Fog"
6. "William Turns Over a New Leaf"

Although each episode bears the name of the short story it is based on, some episodes included material from other short stories in order to provide fuller stories for each episode.
