= Watt on Earth =

Television series

- Genre: Fantasy/Children's TV
- Created by: Pip Baker; Jane Baker
- Written by: Pip Baker; Jane Baker
- Directed by: Roger Singleton-Turner
- Starring: Garth Napier Jones; Tom Brodie; Jessica Simpson; Heather Wright; Simon Cook
- Country of origin: United Kingdom
- Original language: English
- No. of series: 2
- No. of episodes: 24

Production
- Producer: Angela Beeching
- Production location: United Kingdom
- Running time: 15 minutes

Original release
- Network: BBC One
- Release: 11 November 1991 – 23 December 1992

Watt on Earth is a children's television programme that ran for two 12-episode series in 1991 and 1992, shown as part of Children's BBC. It was written by the Doctor Who writers Pip and Jane Baker.

== Premise ==
The show centres around the titular character Watt (Garth Napier Jones); an extraterrestrial with, by human standards, an odd taste in food, and the ability to transanimateobjectify. He comes to Earth to flee his evil uncle: Watt is heir to the throne on his home planet, and his uncle (voice: Michael Kilgarriff) had sent his top henchman Jemadah (John Grillo) to follow and kill Watt. The planet's previous heirs, Watt's parents, are mentioned by Watt as having died in a mysterious 'accident' while on the way to their coronation, which was no doubt caused by the uncle. While Watt is over 300 years of age, he appears to be a human in his early twenties.

Watt lands in the English town of Haxton, where he becomes friends with Sean Ruddock (Tom Brodie). Sean keeps Watt's presence in the house a secret throughout the series.

When they first meet, Watt is disguised as an apple with a blue stalk. Every episode features Watt transanimateobjectifiying into a different inanimate object, each time with an error. Watt himself has back-to-front ears in the first series and green ears in the second. At the end of the last episode of the first series, Watt manages to contact his planet and subsequently leaves without saying goodbye to Sean. At the start of Series 2, Watt returns one Earth year later, though from Watt's point of view, he'd only been gone two weeks as the time is different on his planet.

In the first series, Jemedah is a sinister figure dressed in black who drives a black Mercedes with dark-tinted windows, while in the second series he takes on a variety of different disguises (unlike Watt, Jemadah can shapeshift perfectly, which means he can look like anyone), but his true identity is always eventually exposed. Sean and Watt later manage to work out a pattern to Jemadah's disguises: he always takes on the form of a person who has a name beginning with the letter 'J' (such as Brigadier Jones) or beginning with the 'J' sound (such as Councillor George Carrington).

Sean's parents, Tom (Simon Cook) and Val (Heather Wright), are in charge of the local newspaper, The Haxton Weekly, and think their son is odd. Sean's sister, Zoë (Jessica Simpson), is suspicious of his behaviour, and comes close to seeing Watt on many occasions. Towards the end of the second series, Jemadah places a device outside Sean's house which causes Watt to lose the ability to transanimateobjectify, and in trying to regain the ability, Watt passes through each of the transformations in all the previous episodes. Jemadah disguises himself as private detective J.J. Jefferson (Davyd Harries) and puts up posters of Watt, describing him as a missing heir to an estate. In the final episode of series two, Zoë recognizes Watt as the "missing heir" at an audition and attempts to turn him in to Jemadah. However, Sean and Watt gain access to Jemadah's car and Watt contacts his uncle, who has been overthrown, and realises that Jemadah has failed his mission. Watt's uncle also confirms that he killed Watt's parents. Back at the Ruddocks' house, Jemadah arrives to deal with Watt once and for all, but Watt defeats him by bouncing a beam from Jemadah's alien device off a satellite dish. When the beam strikes Jemadah, he is trapped in a force-field before being expelled into space forever – the same fate he had planned for Watt.

The second series ends with Watt bidding Sean farewell and giving him his photo. Watt transforms into a spaceship and flies back to his planet to take his place as the rightful ruler. Sean is called down to dinner and puts the photo of Watt on his bedside table, saying, "I'll always remember you Watt." After Sean leaves, Watt's photo comes to life and says, "And I'll always remember you."

== Cast ==
- Watt – Garth Napier Jones
- Sean Ruddock – Tom Brodie
- Mr Jemadah/Jemadah – John Grillo
- Hilda Lacey – Isabelle Lucas
- Voice of Watt's Uncle – Michael Kilgarriff
- Zoë Ruddock – Jessica Simpson
- Tom Ruddock – Simon Cook
- Val Ruddock – Heather Wright
- Jonah/Jemadah – Andrew Henry
- Oliver Johnson – Jotham Annan
- Giselle Menton/Jemadah – Emma Lewis
- Brigadier Jeramiah Jones/Jemadah – Michael Godley
- Gillian/Jemadah – Sacha Craise
- Joshua/Jemadah – Felipe Izquierdo
- Councillor George Carrington/Jemadah – Edward Peel
- Jennifer Tate/Jemadah – Francesca Ryan
- J.J. Jefferson/Jemadah – Davyd Harries
- Kate – Laura McMahon
- Lucy – Alex Staden
- and the Greenwood Morris Dancers

== Crew ==
- Pip Baker – Writer
- Jane Baker – Writer
- Roger Singleton-Turner – Director
- Angela Beeching – Producer
- Richard Attree – Composer

== Production ==
- Episode length: 15 minutes
- Series One (12 episodes), 11 November – 17 December 1991, BBC One Mondays & Tuesdays
- Series Two (12 episodes), 16 November – 23 December 1992, BBC One Mondays & Wednesdays
