= Jeillo Edwards =

Sierra Leonean actress (1942–2004)

- Born: 23 September 1942; Freetown, Sierra Leone
- Died: 2 July 2004 (aged 61); London, England
- Education: Guildhall School of Music and Drama
- Occupation: Actress
- Years active: 1972–2003
- Spouse: Edmund Clottey
- Children: 3

Jeillo Edwards (23 September 1942 – 2 July 2004) was a Sierra Leonean actress, who is notable in the history of black actors in Britain. She was the first woman of African descent to study drama at London's Guildhall School of Music and Drama. She went on to be one of the first black actresses to be cast in a mainstream UK television drama series – Dixon of Dock Green, and for more than four decades performed on British television, radio, stage and films.

== Biography ==
Jeillo Angela Doris Edwards was born in Freetown, Sierra Leone, one of six children, and she attended the Annie Walsh Memorial School.

Edwards moved to England in the late 1950s and studied at the Guildhall School of Music and Drama. She began performing at the age of four, reading from the Bible at her church. She was well known for her distinctive voice and imperious enunciation. She featured on the BBC World Service for Africa, which was broadcast in the UK. She became popular in the United Kingdom, appearing on television, where she was the first black woman to appear on British television as well as being the first African to appear on Dixon of Dock Green in 1972. She also appeared on television dramas such as The Professionals, The Bill and Casualty. She performed on British television, radio, stage and films for more than four decades.

Edwards appeared in cameo roles in many British television comedy programmes, including The League of Gentlemen, Absolutely Fabulous, Red Dwarf, Black Books, Spaced and Little Britain, in which she had been planned to appear in the second series before her death.

As well as acting she was a school governor and owned a restaurant called Auntie J's in Brixton.

In the early 1970s, she married a Ghanaian, Edmund Clottey, and they had a daughter and two sons.

Jeillo Edwards died in London on 2 July 2004, at the age of 61. She had suffered chronic kidney problems.

== Actress ==
- 2003: Little Britain .... Nurse (1 episode, 2003)
- 2003: Murder Investigation Team .... Agnes Welsh (1 episode, 2003)
- 2003: Murder in Mind .... Phyllis (1 episode, 2003)
- 2002: Dirty Pretty Things .... Hospital Cleaning Lady
- 2002: Anansi .... Aunt Vera
- 2001: Absolutely Fabulous .... Jeillo (1 episode, 2001)
- 2001: Sam's Game .... Mumma (1 episode, 2001)
- 2001: Spaced .... Tim's Benefit Clerk (1 episode, 2001)
- 2000: Black Books .... Midwife (1 episode, 2000)
- 2000: The Thing About Vince... .... Mrs. Cuffy (2 episodes, 2000)
- 2000: The League of Gentlemen .... Yvonne (1 episode, 2000)
- 2000: Tough Love (TV) .... Irate Woman
- 1999: Red Dwarf .... Second Ground Controller (1 episode, 1999)
- 1998: A Rather English Marriage (TV) .... Sister
- 1998: Babes in the Wood .... Nigerian Lady (1 episode, 1998)
- 1998: In Exile .... Mother (1 episode, 1998)
- 1997: Holding On .... Aunt Gaynor (5 episodes, 1997)
- 1997: Paris, Brixton .... Landlady
- 1996: Beautiful Thing .... Rose
- 1994: Pat and Margaret (TV) .... Tea Bar Lady
- 1994: A Skirt Through History .... Mary Prince (1 episode, 1994)
- 1993: The Line, the Cross & the Curve .... Dancer 'Eat the Music'
- 1992: Screen One .... Mrs. Jessop (1 episode, 1992)
- 1989: Sob Sisters .... Woman with dog (1 episode, 1989)
- 1989: Casualty .... Grandmother / ... (3 episodes, 1989–1997)
- 1988: Rumpole of the Bailey .... Lady Cashier (1 episode, 1988)
- 1988: London's Burning .... Mrs. Jones (1 episode, 1988)
- 1987: The Bill .... Clarice Paine / Mary Mullen / Mrs Ambrose / Mrs Peake / Mrs Konchella / Mrs Keel / Woman at Counter (7 episodes, 1987–2000)
- 1987: Elphida (TV) .... Somali woman
- 1987: Scoop (TV) .... Mrs. Jackson
- 1985: Hammer House of Mystery and Suspense .... Landlady (1 episode, 1985)
- 1983: Maybury .... Mrs. Galsworthy (1 episode, 1983)
- 1982: Love Is Old, Love Is New (TV) .... Ward maid
- 1981: Memoirs of a Survivor .... Woman at Newsstand
- 1979: Empire Road ... Mary O'Fili (1 episode, 1979)
- 1979: Room Service TV series .... Mrs. McGregor (unknown episodes)
- 1978: The Professionals .... West Indian Woman (1 episode, 1978)
- 1978: Betzi (TV) .... Sarah
- 1976: Centre Play .... Nurse (2 episodes, 1976–1977)
- 1975: Play for Today .... Lucy / ... (2 episodes, 1975–1980)
- 1975: Angels .... Mrs. Jobo (2 episodes, 1975–1980)
- 1972: Dixon of Dock Green .... Mrs. Morgan (1 episode, 1972)
