= Polly Adams =

English actress

- Born: Pauline Adams; Chichester, Sussex, England
- Occupation: Actress
- Spouse: Richard Owens
- Children: 3, including Caroline and Susannah
- Relatives: Joseph Harker (great-grandfather)

Pauline "Polly" Adams is an English actress. She is best known for her work on the stage both in England and in the United States, and for her portrayal of Mrs. Brown in the 1990s television series Just William. She made her Broadway debut in a 1975 revival of London Assurance as Grace Harkaway, for which she was nominated for a Drama Desk Award. Her other Broadway credits include Bedroom Farce.

== Early life and education ==
Pauline Adams was born in Chichester, Sussex.

She trained at Royal Academy of Dramatic Art (RADA).

== Career ==
Adams, known as Polly, has appeared in several productions in London theatres, appearing at such theatres as the Old Vic, the Oxford Stage Company, the Hampstead Theatre, the Royal National Theatre, the Greenwich Theatre, the Haymarket Theatre, the Lyric Hammersmith, the Globe Theatre, the Queen's Theatre, the Piccadilly Theatre, the Savoy Theatre, and the Royal Shakespeare Company.

Her theatre credits include Ida in The Chiltern Hundreds, Time and the Conways, A Month in the Country, Pygmalion, Tis Pity She’s a Whore, A Small Family Business, Tons of Money, Plunder, The Philanderer, Engaged, Troilus and Cressida and Don Juan Comes Back From The War, The Government Inspector, Benefactors, The Real Thing, Present Laughter, The Importance of Being Earnest, Hay Fever, The Merchant of Venice, Private Lives, The Complaisant Lover, and Relatively Speaking.

She made her Broadway debut in a 1975 revival of London Assurance as Grace Harkaway, for which she was nominated for a Drama Desk Award. Her other Broadway credits include Bedroom Farce.

Adams worked on television in the UK, appearing in shows including The Ruth Rendell Mysteries, Element of Doubt, Just William, A Dark-Adapted Eye, The Cinder Path, Blisters , Inspector Alleyn, Bonjour la Classe, The Camomile Lawn, Sob Sisters, Executive Stress, The Murder at the Vicarage, Faint-Hearted Feminist, Winter Sunshine, Goodbye Darling , Tribute to the Lady, Upstairs, Downstairs, The First Churchills, The Spoils of Poynton, Pride and Prejudice, and Compact and Sea Song.

Her film credits include Clinic Exclusive (1971), Element of Doubt (1996), and Kisna: The Warrior Poet (2005).

== Personal life ==
Her daughters, Susannah, Nelly, and Caroline Harker are also actresses. Adams portrayed Jane Bennet in the 1967 television adaptation of Pride and Prejudice, while Susannah Harker played the same role in the 1995 TV series Pride and Prejudice.

== Filmography ==
=== Film ===
Year	Title	Role	Notes
1964	Never Put It in Writing	Receptionist	
1970	A Cup of Kindness	Tilly Winn	TV film
1970	She Follows Me About	Benny	TV film
1971	Clinic Exclusive	Ann	
1976	Private Lives	Sibyl Chase	TV film
1980	Bedroom Farce	Jan	TV film
1986	The Murder at the Vicarage	Ann Protheroe	TV film
1986	L'étincelle	Kathryn	
1996	Element of Doubt	Ellen	TV film
2002	Falling Apart	Clare's Mum	TV film
2005	Kisna: The Warrior Poet	Lady Katherine	

=== Television ===
Year	Title	Role	Notes
1959	Dixon of Dock Green	Sally Ford	Episode: "Duffy Calls the Tune"
1959	The Two Charleys	Jessie	Episode: "Canteen Capers"
1960	Theatre Night	Serena Tilney	Episode: "The Bride Comes Back"
1961	An Enemy of the People	Petra Stockmann	Miniseries
1961	ITV Play of the Week	Penny Gracey	Episode: "The Two on the Beach"
1962	BBC Sunday-Night Play	Clarissa Davenport	Episode: "Both Ends Meet"
1962	Suspense	Miss Eaton	Episode: "Killer in the Band"
1962	Somerset Maugham Hour	Sally	Episode: "Killer in the Band"
1963	ITV Play of the Week	Tessie Dunton	Episode: "For King and Country #2: The Barricade"
1964	Drama 61-67	Jan	Episode: "Drama '64: The Brick Umbrella"
1964–1965	Compact	Julia Preston	Series regular
1967	Pride and Prejudice	Jane Bennet	Miniseries
1968	Sexton Blake	Barbara Mayne	4 episodes
1968	ITV Playhouse	Caol	Episode: "Neutral Ground"
1969	Who-Dun-It	Delphine Minniver	Episode: "Crime at the Panto"
1969	The First Churchills	Henrietta Churchill	5 episodes
1970	The Spoils of Poynton	Maggie	Miniseries
1970	From a Bird's Eye View	Betty	Episode: "Millie's Moveable Feast"
1972	Villains	Mother	Episode: "Sand Dancer"
1974	ITV Sunday Night Theatre	Jackie	Episode: "Only the Other Day"
1974	Armchair Cinema	Anna	Episode: "Sea Song"
1975	Three Comedies of Marriage		Episode: "One of the Family"
1975	Upstairs, Downstairs	Mrs. Polly Merivale	Episode: "Such a Lovely Man"
1976	BBC Play of the Month	Margaret Orme	Episode: "Loyalties"
1977	Devenish	Prudence Devenish	Episode: "The Great American Job"
1978	The Sunday Drama	Eloise Gainsborough	Episode: "The Marrying Kind"
1981	Goodbye Darling	Phillippa	Episode: "Daisy"
1984	The Fainthearted Feminist	Irene	
1984	Winter Sunlight	Jane	Miniseries
1986	Executive Stress	Olive	1 episode
1989	Sob Sisters	Dorothy	Series regular
1991	The Ruth Rendell Mysteries	Melanie Dearborn	Episode: "Murder Being Once Done"
1992	The Camomile Lawn	Sarah	Miniseries
1993	Bonjour la Classe	Jean Halifax	Series regular
1993	Alleyn Mysteries	Mildred Potter	Episode: "Death in a White Tie"
1994	A Dark-Adapted Eye	Helen	Miniseries
1994	The Cinder Path	Florence Chapman	Miniseries
1994–1995	Just William	Mrs. Brown	Series regular
2009	Kingdom	Amelia	1 episode

=== Theatre ===
Year	Title	Role	Venue	Notes
1959	The Complaisant Lover	Ann Howard	Globe Theatre, London	
1962	The Chances	Extra	Chichester Festival Theatre, Chichester	
1962	The Broken Heart	Christella	Chichester Festival Theatre, Chichester	
1963	Gentle Jack	Cynthia	Queens Theatre, London	
1967	Relatively Speaking	Virginia	Duke of York's Theatre, London	
1971	Dear Antoine	Anémone	Piccadilly Theatre, London	
1973	Private Lives	Sibyl Chase	Globe Theatre, London	
1975	Engaged	Belinda Treherne	The Old Vic, London	
1976	Troilus and Cressida	Helen	Royal National Theatre, London	
1976	Plunder	Joan Hewlett	Lyttelton Theatre, London	
1977	The Country Wife	Alithea	Olivier Theatre, London	
1978	The Philanderer	Grace Tranfield	Lyttelton Theatre, London	
1978	Don Juan Comes Back From The War	Ensemble	Cottesloe Theatre, London	
1978	Bedroom Farce	Jan	Prince of Wales Theatre, London	
1979	Hay Fever	Myra Arundel	Lyric Theatre, London	
1980	The Importance of Being Earnest	Gwendolen Fairfax	Haymarket Theatre, Leicester & The Old Vic, London	
1981	Present Laughter	Joanna	Greenwich Theatre, London & Vaudeville Theatre, London	
1982	The Real Thing	Charlotte	Strand Theatre, London	
1985	Benefactors	Jane	Vaudeville Theatre, London	
1986	Tons of Money	Louise Allington	Lyttelton Theatre, London	
1987	A Small Family Business	Poppy McCracken	Olivier Theatre, London	
1988	'Tis Pity She's a Whore	Hippolita	Olivier Theatre, London	
1990	Rumors	Christine Bevans	Chichester Festival Theatre, Chichester	also, UK tour
1991	The Government Inspector	Anna	Greenwich Theatre, London	
1992	Pygmalion	Mrs Eynsford-Hill	Olivier Theatre, London	
1994	A Month in the Country	Lizaveta Bogdanovna	Yvonne Arnaud Theatre, Guildford & Albery Theatre, London	
1997	Time and the Conways	Mrs. Conway	Mercury Theatre, Colchester & Salisbury Playhouse, Salisbury	
1999	The Chiltern Hundreds	Lady Lister	Vaudeville Theatre, London	
2000	The Good Samaritan	Muriel	Hampstead Theatre, London	
2001	The Winslow Boy	Grace Winslow	Chichester Festival Theatre, Chichester	also, UK Tour
2005	Marrying the Mistress	Laura Stockdale	Jersey Opera House, Saint Helier	
2006	Entertaining Angels	Ruth	Chichester Festival Theatre, Chichester	
2007	For Services Rendered	Charlotte Ardsley	Watermill Theatre, Bagnor	
2008	Legal Fictions		Savoy Theatre, London	
2010	A Voyage Round My Father	Mother	Salisbury Playhouse, Salisbury	
2014	Rapture, Blister, Burn	Alice	Hampstead Theatre, London	
2016	Home Chat	Mrs. Ebony	Finborough Theatre, London	
