= Apparitions (TV series) =

2008 British television drama series

- Genre: Drama; Supernatural drama Mystery
- Created by: Joe Ahearne; Nick Collins
- Developed by: Lime Pictures
- Starring: Martin Shaw
- Country of origin: United Kingdom
- Original language: English
- No. of series: 1
- No. of episodes: 6

Production
- Executive producers: Carolyn Reynolds; Tony Wood
- Running time: 60 minutes

Original release
- Network: BBC One; BBC HD
- Release: 13 November – 18 December 2008

Apparitions is a BBC six-part drama about Father Jacob Myers, a priest of the Roman Catholic Church, played by Martin Shaw, who examines evidence of miracles to be used in canonisation but also performs exorcisms.

The series is written by Joe Ahearne.

== Episodes ==
=== Episode 1 ===
In Rome, a meeting is being held at the Congregation for the Causes of Saints. Father Jacob, a London priest and investigator of miracles for the Congregation, has presented a case that may lead to Mother Teresa's canonization: Vimal, a young man who is currently training to enter the priesthood, was cured of leprosy (without antibiotics) after praying to Mother Teresa.

Vimal was spontaneously cured when he was a child, just as Mother Teresa died, a miracle that has been offered as proof of her right to sainthood. But Vimal is soon visited by the apparition of a demon in the guise of a homeless man named Michael, and comes to realize that it was, in fact, demons who restored his flesh. He also feels that they are causing his homosexual thoughts.

Meanwhile, a little girl named Donna approaches Father Jacob, claiming that her father, Liam, is possessed. When Father Jacob approaches the girl's father with a request to perform an exorcism, Liam violently rejects the suggestion. When he finally does agree—in order to keep Father Jacob from telling Social Services that he struck Donna in a fit of anger—the event goes badly; the demons in Liam threaten and then attack Father Jacob, leaving the priest unconscious on the kitchen floor.

Liam phones his daughter and convinces her to meet him that night. The demons' plans to defile her are thwarted when Father Jacob and Monsignor Vincenzo arrive to perform a full exorcism. As they begin, the demons tell Father Jacob that if he continues the exorcism, they will 'take back' the miracle they performed for Vimal.

After Cardinal Bukovak rejects Vimal as a potential priest, the young man finds himself drawn to a men's bathhouse. While Vimal looks to finally satisfy his sexual urges, a possessed Michael appears and skins him alive. At the same time, Liam is freed of his possession by Jacob and Vincenzo, at the spot in Kensington Gardens where Donna was conceived at the exact moment of Mother Teresa's death.

==== Cast (in order of appearance) ====
- Father Jacob: Martin Shaw
- Vimal: Elyes Gabel
- Cardinal Bukovak: John Shrapnel
- Monsignor Vincenzo: Luigi Diberti
- Michael/Astaruth: Rick Warden
- Donna: Romy Irving
- Sister Anne: Michelle Joseph
- Sarah: Sarah-Jayne Steed
- Liam: Shaun Dooley

=== Episode 2 ===
First Broadcast simultaneously on BBC One and BBC HD, 20 November 2008 at 21:00

This episode immediately follows the first episode. The father of the girl has been freed from his possession. However, Father Jacob now realizes that people close to him are being deliberately targeted by demons. The homeless man appears repeatedly, challenging Jacob to a kind of exorcism duel - they shall battle each other for supremacy and see who comes out on top, God or Lucifer. There are puzzles and clues that lead to some amalgam of the Holocaust, hell, heaven, the next Vatican exorcist, the usual stuff. This mystery leads Father Jacob into the past of Monsignor Vincenzo. Meanwhile, Cardinal Bukovak begins to prevent Father Jacob from practicing future exorcisms.

==== Cast (in order of appearance) ====
- Father Jacob: Martin Shaw
- Sister Ruth: Siobhan Finneran
- Cardinal Bukovak: John Shrapnel
- Michael/Astaroth: Rick Warden
- Monsignor Vincenzo: Luigi Diberti
- Donna: Romy Irving
- Sister Anne: Michelle Joseph
- Sarah: Sarah-Jayne Steed
- Liam: Shaun Dooley
- DI Rachel: Stephanie Street

=== Episode 3 ===
First Broadcast simultaneously on BBC One and BBC HD, 27 November 2008 at 21:00

Father Jacob is called in by Father Daniel to investigate reports of demonic possession in a prison. Father Jacob thinks it may be a case of possession by a saint and not a demon; the first in all of recorded church history. Cardinal Bukovak begins to take a more active role in stopping Father Jacob's pursuit of performing exorcisms.

==== Cast (in order of appearance) ====
- Father Jacob: Martin Shaw
- Cardinal Bukovak: John Shrapnel
- Sister Ruth: Siobhan Finneran
- Michael/Astaruth: Rick Warden
- Father Daniel: David Gyasi
- Cory Wardell: Stephen Wight
- Governor Lassiter: Neil Pearson
- Kim Portman: Elizabeth Berrington
- Mrs. Wardell: Linda Holmes
- Fiona: Mia Fernandez
- Alessandro Serenelli: Federico Natoli

=== Episode 4 ===
First Broadcast simultaneously on BBC One and BBC HD, 4 December 2008 at 21:00

Father Jacob investigates two mysterious pregnancies at an abortion clinic. One is a seventy-year-old woman and the other is a young girl that shows signs of demonic possession.

==== Cast (in order of appearance) ====
- Father Jacob: Martin Shaw
- Sister Ruth: Siobhan Finneran
- Michael/Astaruth: Rick Warden
- Dr. Janice Greely: Claudia Harrison
- Zoe Dayton: Karen Bryson
- Craig: Andy Dear
- Simon: Adrian Bower
- Lisa Sengrath: Jo Woodcock
- Pietro Fonti: Vernon Dobtcheff
- Rosa Fonti: Ruth Posner

=== Episode 5 ===
First Broadcast simultaneously on BBC One and BBC HD, 11 December 2008 at 21:00

Father Jacob investigates when a teenager claims to have visions of the Virgin Mary and sweats blood. The boy's family is Muslim and he is convinced that his father is in Hell and only by forcing someone to do a reverse exorcism can his father be freed from Hell. Father Jacob also learns more about Michael's mysterious past. Meanwhile, Cardinal Bukovak arrives to rein in Father Jacob.

==== Cast (in order of appearance) ====
- Father Jacob: Martin Shaw
- Cardinal Bukovak: John Shrapnel
- Sister Ruth: Siobhan Finneran
- Michael/Astaruth: Rick Warden
- Monsignor Vincenzo: Luigi Diberti
- Zaid Kopavic: Jamie Blackley
- Imam Ahmed: Hassani Shapi
- Misal Kopavic: Patrick Knowles
- Sana Kopavic: Brana Bajic

=== Episode 6 ===
First Broadcast simultaneously on BBC One and BBC HD, 18 December 2008 at 21:00

Possessed now and unable to pray, Jacob is stalked by Michael. Cardinal Bukovak assigns Dr. Elaine Errison, an atheist psychologist, to assess Jacob. She believes that his religious beliefs (and Christianity) are a kind of mental illness. After being relieved of his duties, Jacob leaves the seminary and stays in a hotel where a mysterious woman tells him that anyone who attempts to exorcise him will be killed. With Jacob, Daniel and Ruth all reciting the prayer, Michael is vanquished, but in his final moments puts a bullet into Cardinal Bukovak, who is subsequently promoted for apparently attempting to defend the Pope. As he departs he makes it clear that he will continue to work to destroy the practice of exorcism, and Jacob implies that he is ready for Bukovak's efforts.

==== Cast (in order of appearance) ====
- Father Jacob: Martin Shaw
- Cardinal Bukovak: John Shrapnel
- Sister Ruth: Siobhan Finneran
- Michael/Astaruth: Rick Warden
- Father Daniel: David Gyasi
- Monsignor Vincenzo: Luigi Diberti
- Dr. Elaine Errison: Claire Price
- Girl: Antonia Whillans
- Woman: Cherie Lunghi
- Soprano: Josephine Amankwah

=== Ratings ===
The figures as quoted on Digital Spy for the first showing on BBC 1.

- Episode 1 (Thursday 13 November 2008): 4.62 million (20.6% of audience share for the time slot)
- Episode 2 (Thursday 20 November 2008): 2.88 million (12.6%)
- Episode 3 (Thursday 27 November 2008): 2.71 million (11.6%)
- Episode 4 (Thursday 4 December 2008): 3.12 million (13.2%)
- Episode 5 (Thursday 11 December 2008): 3.01 million (14.1%)
- Episode 6 (Thursday 18 December 2008): 3.08 million (14.5%)

Average for all 6: 3.23 million (14.4%) - down around 25% on the average viewing figures for this time slot (for example, the previous week's concluding episode of Silent Witness got 6.1 million viewers in the same time slot)

== Title sequence ==
The opening credits sequence, designed by Simon A. J. Cox, shows a weeping statue of Mary against a background of London with cars passing.
