= A Caribbean Dream =

2017 romantic comedy film

- Directed by: Shakirah Bourne
- Written by: Shakirah Bourne
- Produced by: Melissa Simmonds; Lynette Eastmond
- Starring: Aden Gillett, Sonia Williams, Susannah Harker, Adrian Green, Lorna Gayle
- Release date: 2017

A Caribbean Dream is a 2017 romantic comedy, produced by Melissa Simmonds and Lynette Eastmond, directed by Shakirah Bourne. The adaptation of William Shakespeare's A Midsummer Night's Dream was conceptualised and cast by Melissa Simmonds and written by Shakirah Bourne. The film stars Aden Gillett as Theseus, Sonia Williams as Hippolyta, Susannah Harker as Titania and Adrian Green as Oberon with Lorna Gayle as Bottom. There is an extensive cast of both English and Barbadian actors, this re-imagined traditional tale takes a twist under the full moon, as many wonders occur during this fated Caribbean Festival.

The film won Best Feature at the 2017 London Independent Film Festival, Best Produced Drama at the 2018 National Film Awards in the UK, Best International Film at the 2017 Charlotte Black Film Festival, and Best Produced Screenplay at the 2017 Los Angeles Independent Film Festival Awards. Additionally, it was nominated for the East End Film Festival in 2017

== Plot ==
Set in modern day, on the Caribbean island of Barbados, the film "plays out in a carnival atmosphere as Puck - the butler - and the staff of a tropical home, turn into mischievous fairies and tamper with the wedding plans of three couples". While Theseus and Hippolyta are returning nationals, we also reconvene with some earlier characters, including Birdman and a Changeling boy, the mechanicals re-imagined as fishermen, the fairies carrying mobile phones, and a female Bottom as a Black Belly Sheep. Through an intertwining of Caribbean and Shakespearean folklore, culture history, and the surrounding landscape, the story unfolds in chaos and madness as mystery, magic and romance take over underneath the Caribbean moonlight.

Hermia is promised in marriage to Demetrius, but she is in love with Lysander, who is also secretly in love with her. Hermia must marry Demetrius or forfeit everything, so she and Lysander flee into the forest. Meanwhile, Helena pines for Lysander, but the more she pursues him (via mobile phone) the faster he flees.

Meanwhile a group of fishermen and women are preparing for a talent contest by creating a play, The Untold Story of King JaJa and The Young Becca, based on a local folk song about the relationship between King Jaja of Opobo and a young Barbadian girl.

Moving from the beach, to the dream-like and magical fairy kingdom in the forest, to the frenzy of the modern-day carnival, the story moves along as Oberon asks Puck to use a love potion on Queen Titania in order to make her fall in love with the first living creature she sees upon waking. Later the same tactic is used, accidentally, on Lysander, causing him to fall in love with Helena, resulting in a fight between Hermia and Helena.

In the end, after all the madness and chaos is sorted out, the film finishes with a triple wedding.

== Cast ==
- Aden Gillett as Theseus
- Sonia Williams as Hippolyta
- Adrian Greene as Oberon/Head of Gardening
- Susannah Harker as Titania/Head of Housekeeping
- Lorna Gayle as Bottom the Fisherwoman
- Simon Alleyne as Quince
- Patrick Michael Foster as Puck

== Production ==
The film was the brainchild of British and Barbadian producer Melissa Simmonds, the film was shot in Barbados in 2015 with 75% Barbadian and 25% British cast and crew . This film explores Caribbean folklore and culture through a unique and entertaining re-telling of one of Shakespeare's most beloved comedies. While other adaptations, notably Much Ado About Nothing (2012) are shot in mono-chrome, this film uses bold, vibrant, and hyper realistic colors to immerse the viewer into the fairy tale. Though it is not a straight retelling of Shakespeare's play, it includes a great portion of the original text and original soul of the play, intertwining it with an authentic, upbeat Barbadian soundtrack. As director Shakirah Bourne adds: "What you will see when you watch A Caribbean Dream is Shakespeare's words spoken in Bajan dialect and with a Bajan accent, and the visuals will definitely help with the understanding of the play".

Executive Producers: Christian Roberts and Keith Morris.

== Reception ==
A Caribbean Dream garnered much attention over its release, and its unique multicultural production. On review aggregator website Rotten Tomatoes, the film has an approval rating of 67%, based on 6 reviews. On Caution Spoilers review aggregator website, the film receives 4 out of 5 stars. In her review, Sarah, a Rotten Tomatoes-approved critic, states: "It's an excellent introduction to one of his loveliest plays, in an accessibly modern setting. And while cutting so much is always going to mean losing some depth, it is still a rather magical retelling of an age-old story".

Writing for The Guardian, Cath Clarke gave the film three out of five stars.
