= Susannah Harker =

English actress

- Born: Hampstead, London, England
- Occupation: Actor
- Years active: 1985–present
- Spouse: Iain Glen (m. 1993; div. 2004)
- Partner: Paul McGann (2006–2008)
- Children: 1
- Mother: Polly Adams
- Relatives: Caroline Harker (sister); Joseph Harker (great-great-grandfather)

Susannah Harker is an English film, television, and theatre actress. She was nominated for a BAFTA TV Award in 1991 for her role as Mattie Storin in House of Cards. She played Jane Bennet in the 1995 TV adaptation of Pride and Prejudice.

== Acting career ==
Harker has acted in both contemporary and classic works, on stage, in movies and in TV series. In 1990–91 she appeared alongside Clive Owen in Chancer, and as the journalist Mattie Storin in the original House of Cards. She later played Dinah Morris in the 1991 adaptation of Adam Bede. She starred as Jane Bennet in the 1995 TV adaptation of Jane Austen's Pride and Prejudice. She is featured as Emma Fitzgerald, the love interest of Superintendent Tyburn (Trevor Eve) in the BBC TV series, Heat of the Sun (1998). In 2003 she played Clare Keightley in the audio version of the Doctor Who adventure Shada, alongside Paul McGann.

On stage in 2005, she appeared in Simon Stephens's play On the Shore of the Wide World at the Royal National Theatre. In 2008, she played Gwendoline in Charles Wood's Jingo at the Finborough Theatre, where the Evening Standard reviewed her performance, saying "Susannah Harker, an actress who should appear more often in our major playhouses, is in beautifully crisp form as Gwendoline."

She played Sapphire in Big Finish Productions' audio revival of Sapphire & Steel, in three series of plays released on CD between 2005 and 2008. In December 2011 Harker appeared in the BBC drama Young James Herriot. In 2012 she returned to the stage, playing the role of Sue in a London production of Mike Leigh's Abigail's Party. During early 2014 she starred in the Gate Theatre, Dublin production of The Vortex by Noël Coward.

She has also worked in radio. In 2015, she played Miss Ella Rentheim in a BBC Radio 4 production of Ibsen's John Gabriel Borkman. She played Kris in Radio 4’s 2021 drama Barred written by Thandi Lubimbi and Richard Kurti.

== Personal life ==
Harker is a great-great-granddaughter of Joseph Harker, an artist and theatrical scene designer.

She was married to Iain Glen from 1993 to 2004; they have one son. She was later in a relationship with Paul McGann from 2006 to 2008.

Harker's sisters, Nelly Harker and Caroline Harker, are also actresses.

== Filmography ==
=== Film ===
Year	Title	Role	Notes
1985	Burke & Wills	Bessie Wills	
1987	White Mischief	Young girl	
1987	The Lady's Not for Burning	Alizon Eliot	
1989	A Dry White Season	Suzette du Toit	
1991	The Crucifer of Blood	Irene St. Claire	
1996	Surviving Picasso	Marie-Therese	
2001	Intimacy	Susan, Jay's wife	
2001	Trance	Sarah Lamb	
2001	Offending Angels	Paris	
2007	Always Crashing in the Same Car	Mary Booth	Short
2008	The Calling	Sister Ambrose	
2012	Notes from the Underground	Lonely Lady	
2017	A Caribbean Dream	Titania/Head of Housekeeping	

=== Television ===
Year	Title	Role	Notes
1988	The Fear	Linda	5 episodes
1988	Troubles	Angela Spencer	
1990–1991	Chancer	Joanna Franklyn	14 episodes
1990	House of Cards	Mattie Storin	4 episodes
1991	Adam Bede	Dinah Morris	
1994	The Memoirs of Sherlock Holmes	Adelaide Savage	Episode: "The Dying Detective"
1994	Faith	Holly Moreton	4 episodes
1995	Pride and Prejudice	Jane Bennet	6 episodes
1998	Heat of the Sun	Emma Fitzgerald	3 episodes
1998	Ultraviolet	Dr Angela Marsh	6 episodes, TV mini-series
2001	Murder in Mind	Barbara Davie	
2002	Waking the Dead	Clare Delaney	2 episodes
2006	Perfect Parents	Alison	TV film
2009	Midsomer Murders	Matilda Simms	1 episode, The Black Book
2010	Moving On	Anne	1 episode, Sauce for the Goose
2011	Young James Herriot	Lady Verity Muirhead	1 episode
2012	New Tricks	Elizabeth Clayton	1 episode, Old School Ties
2017	Grantchester	Veronica Stone	1 episode

== Theatre ==
Year	Title	Role	Company	Venue
2003	Three Sisters	Masha		Playhouse Theatre, London
2005	On the Shore of the Wide World			Royal National Theatre
2008	Jingo	Gwendoline		Finborough Theatre
2017	The Blinding Light	Siri		Jermyn Street Theatre
