= Trance (2013 film) =

- UK release poster
- Directed by: Danny Boyle
- Screenplay by: Joe Ahearne; John Hodge
- Story by: Joe Ahearne
- Produced by: Christian Colson
- Starring: James McAvoy; Vincent Cassel; Rosario Dawson
- Cinematography: Anthony Dod Mantle
- Edited by: Jon Harris
- Music by: Rick Smith
- Production companies: Pathé; Film4; Cloud Eight Films; Decibel Films; Ingenious Media; Indian Paintbrush
- Distributed by: 20th Century Fox (United Kingdom); Fox Searchlight Pictures (United States); Pathé Distribution (France)
- Release dates: 19 March 2013 (London premiere); 27 March 2013 (United Kingdom); 5 April 2013 (United States); 8 May 2013 (France)
- Running time: 101 minutes
- Countries: United Kingdom; United States; France
- Language: English
- Budget: $20 million
- Box office: $24.3 million

Trance is a 2013 psychological thriller film directed by Danny Boyle with a screenplay by Joe Ahearne and John Hodge from a story by Ahearne. It stars James McAvoy, Vincent Cassel and Rosario Dawson. The film had its world premiere in London on 19 March 2013, and was released in the United Kingdom on 27 March. It received generally positive reviews from critics and grossed $24 million.

== Plot ==
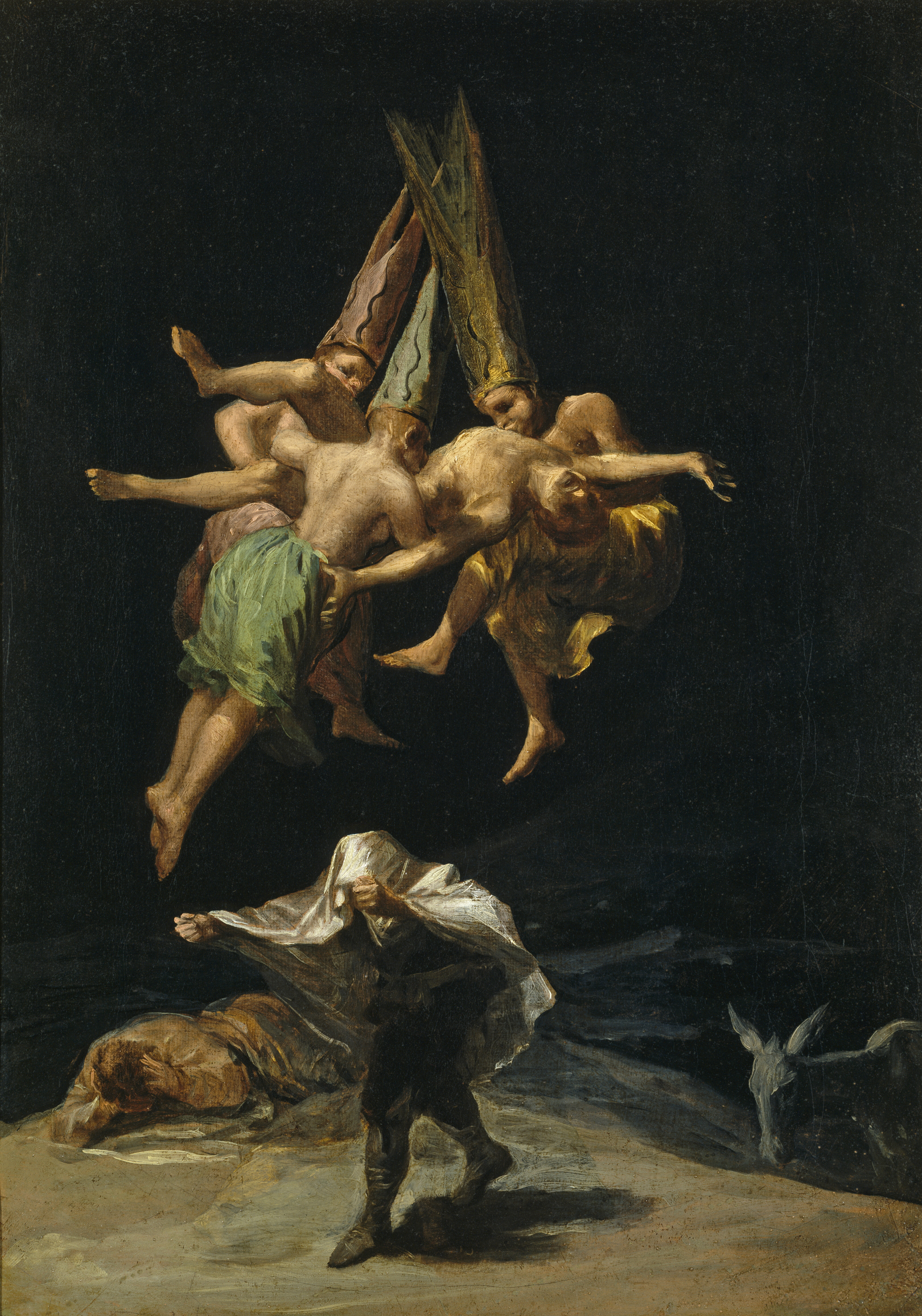
Francisco Goya's Witches in the Air (1798), the painting stolen in the film. In reality, it is part of the collection of the Museo del Prado.

During a heist on an auction house, thieves take a package which presumably contains a valuable painting. Auctioneer Simon Newton attacks their leader Franck, who hits Simon on the head, knocking him unconscious. Later, Franck discovers that the package contains only an empty frame. Simon, the heist's "inside man", double-crossed him. Looking for the painting, the thieves kidnap and torture Simon. However, the blow to the head left him with a case of amnesia: he cannot recall where he hid the painting. They need a hypnotherapist to help him remember.

Simon chooses Elizabeth Lamb from a list. Using a fake name, Simon tells her that he is after some lost keys, hoping that she leads him to the painting instead. She quickly sees through Simon's façade, forcing the thieves to negotiate with her.

In exchange for a cut of the proceeds from the sale of the painting, Elizabeth keeps hypnotizing Simon. Between sessions, he reveals that his gambling addiction got him involved with Franck. Franck offered to settle Simon's debts in exchange for help stealing the painting.

In one session, Simon remembers that, during the heist, he cut the painting from the frame and hid it in his suit. When Franck was about to notice this, Simon attacked him. Shortly after the blow to his head, he awoke alone. While leaving the auction house, Simon was distracted by a text message and got hit by a red car. He erroneously remembers the driver as having been Elizabeth.

After Simon is put in another hypnotic state, the thieves discover that he is obsessed with her. She says that this is due to transference. If Elizabeth seduces Simon, she may get him to say where the painting is.

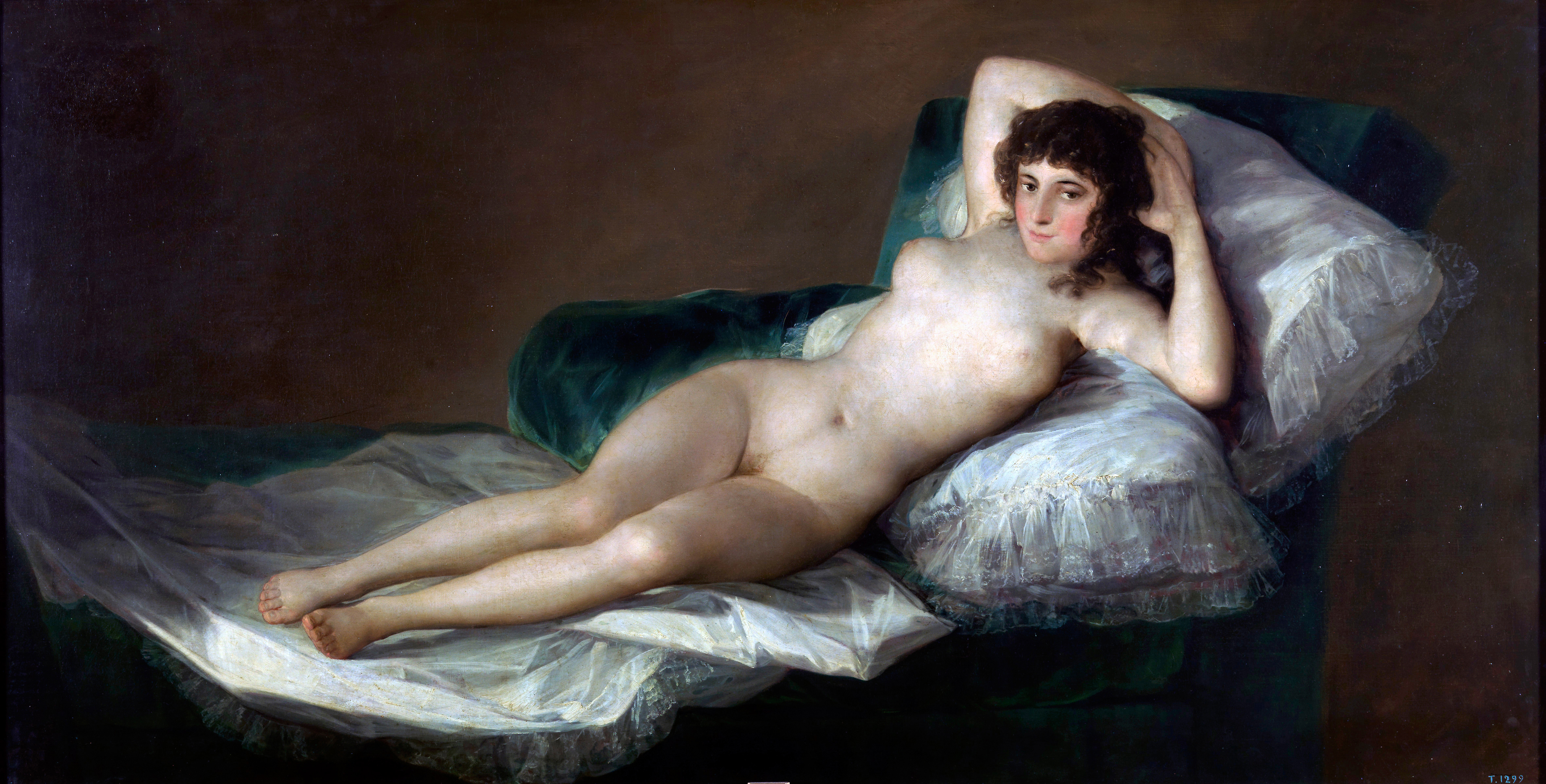
Goya's Nude Maja (ca. 1795), a painting Simon discusses in the film.

The two go on a date, where he abruptly cools toward her and goes home. She tells Franck that this happened because Simon is jealous of him. Franck and Elizabeth then have sex. One of the thieves sees this and tells Simon, who later decides to confront Elizabeth. Managing to trigger his lust and calm his jealousy, she hypnotizes him. By leading Simon through an imagined narrative in which Franck wants to kill him, Elizabeth learns the painting's location. However, she is caught by the thieves shortly after. Simon and Franck are sent to get the painting, while the other thieves stay to rape Elizabeth. When Franck is distracted by her screams, Simon overpowers him and kills the other thieves.

Elizabeth convinces Simon to spare Franck and bring him with them to get the painting. At a parking garage, the trio collect a red car and drive it to a warehouse. During the trip, Elizabeth reveals that Simon had previously come to her for help with his gambling addiction. They started an affair, but he became obsessive, jealous, and, eventually, abusive. Fearing for her life, she used hypnosis to make him forget her. When Franck hit Simon on the head, it brought back a vague sense of his memories of Elizabeth. In his confused state, he imagined the female driver who hit him as Elizabeth and strangled the woman to death. Her body is in the car's trunk.

At the warehouse, Simon gives Elizabeth the painting and then douses the car in fuel, with Franck still zip-tied inside it. To save Franck, Elizabeth drives a truck into Simon. Both Simon and the car are pushed through a wall and into a river. Franck escapes, while Simon dies. Elizabeth later disappears.

Franck later receives an iPad containing a video of Elizabeth, who now has the painting. When Elizabeth hypnotized Simon to make him forget her, she also told him to steal a painting for her as payback for his abuse. That is why Simon betrayed Franck. The text Simon received before being hit by the car was from Elizabeth and instructed him to deliver the painting to her. Franck can try to find Elizabeth and recover the painting, or he can open "Trance", an app on the iPad with a recording of her voice that will erase her and the whole ordeal from his memory–the choice to remember or forget is his.

== Cast ==
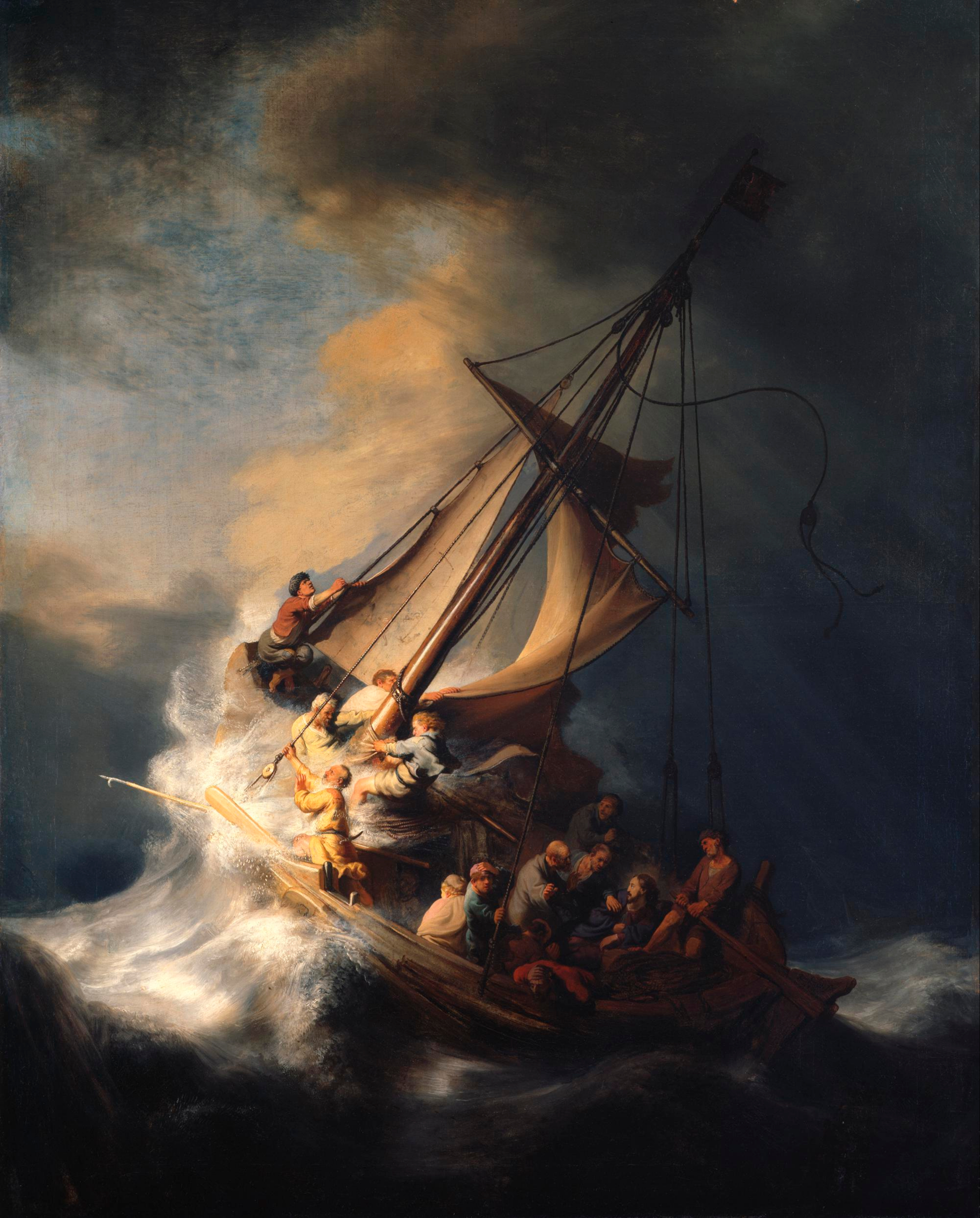
Rembrandt's Storm on the Sea of Galilee (1633), a painting Simon uses to introduce and frame the film, drawing attention to the central self-portrait of Rembrandt, who calmly stares out at the viewer while chaos rages around him.

- James McAvoy as Simon Newton
- Vincent Cassel as Franck
- Rosario Dawson as Elizabeth Lamb
- Danny Sapani as Nate
- Matt Cross as Dominic
- Wahab Sheikh as Riz
- Mark Poltimore (7th Baron Poltimore) as Francis Lemaitre
- Tuppence Middleton as Young Woman in Red Car
- Simon Kunz as Surgeon
- Michael Shaeffer as Security Guard #1
- Tony Jayawardena as Security Guard #2
- Vincent Montuel as Handsome Waiter
- Jai Rajani as Car Park Attendant
- Spencer Wilding as 60's Robber
- Gursharan Chaggar as Postman
- Edward Rising as 60's Auctioneer

== Production ==
=== Development ===
After director Danny Boyle filmed Shallow Grave in 1994, Joe Ahearne sent the director his screenplay for Trance, seeking Boyle's encouragement. Boyle thought the project would be "quite difficult" for an inexperienced screenwriter. Ahearne later turned the script into a 2001 British television movie. Boyle never forgot it, and, almost two decades after their original conversation, he contacted Ahearne about turning it into a feature film. Partially based on Ahearne's television film of the same name, Trance underwent script doctoring by screenwriter John Hodge, marking the fifth motion picture collaboration between Hodge and Boyle.

=== Casting ===
In May 2011, Michael Fassbender was cast as Franck, but he later dropped out due to scheduling conflicts. Colin Firth was considered for the part before Cassel was cast. Scarlett Johansson, Melanie Thierry, and Zoe Saldaña were considered for the role that went to Dawson.

McAvoy, who accepted his role in 2011, said that, while reading the script, he almost turned down the part because Simon seemed to be a victim, which didn't interest him. He told NPR's reporter Laura Sullivan: "And then I got about 15 or 20 pages in, and I started to sense that something else was coming in the character. And then something else did come. And then about every 10 pages, something else came. Until at the end, I was hungry to play this part."

=== Filming ===
Principal photography for the film began in September 2011. After filming wrapped up, the film was placed on hold in order for Boyle to work on the opening ceremony of the 2012 Summer Olympics in London. Post-production was then picked up again in August 2012.

Boyle said that this is "the first time I put a woman at the heart of a movie." He also said that he originally intended to set the movie in New York City, but it was filmed in London and in Kent instead, as Boyle's Olympic ceremony duties meant he had to stay in the United Kingdom. Additional filming took place in late November 2011 at the Notre-Dame du Haut chapel in Ronchamp, France.

=== Music ===
On 4 January 2013, it was announced that Rick Smith of the band Underworld would be composing the music for the film. Underworld previously contributed tracks to other Danny Boyle films, including Trainspotting (1996), A Life Less Ordinary (1997), The Beach (2000), and Sunshine (2007). About the collaboration, Smith said: "After finishing the Opening Ceremony, I hardly knew what day of the week it was. I took a month off work, off music, off everything. Exactly one month and three days after we said goodbye in the stadium, I received a text from Danny that said, 'Do you ever want to hear from me again workwise and would that go as far as having a chat about Trance... Questions, questions.' Two Minutes later I was on board."

When asked by an interviewer about the secret of his 17-year-old creative partnership with Smith, Boyle joked, "He's cheap." Then, answering seriously, he said that they both like electronic music and that he doesn't prescribe a sound for a scene, but lets Smith follow his own instincts.

The soundtrack album for Trance was released in the United Kingdom on 25 March 2013 and in the United States on 2 April.

== Release ==
Boyle showed a teaser trailer for the film and an extended version of an alternate ending at South by Southwest on 9 March 2013. The entire film could not be screened at the festival, as is usually done, because the producing studio Pathé owned the rights to the world premiere, which was held in London on 19 March 2013. The film had a general release in the United Kingdom on 27 March 2013 and in the United States on 5 April.

=== Home media ===
Trance was released on DVD and Blu-ray on July 23, 2013.

== Reception ==
On the review aggregator website Rotten Tomatoes, 68% of 184 critics' reviews are positive. The website's consensus reads: "As stylish as ever, director Danny Boyle seems to be treading water with the surprisingly thinly written Trance -- but for fans of Boyle's work, it should still prove a trippily entertaining distraction." Metacritic, which uses a weighted average, assigned the film a score of 61 out of 100, based on 34 critics, indicating "generally favorable" reviews.

In its review, Empire magazine gave the film 4 out of 5 stars and called it "a dazzling, absorbing entertainment which shows off Danny Boyle's mastery of complex storytelling and black, black humour." Empire also ranked the film #27 in its top 50 films of 2013.

Washington Post writer Michael O'Sullivan described Boyle as "playing fast and loose with reality."
