= Ultraviolet (TV serial) =

- Title card
- Created by: Joe Ahearne
- Starring: Jack Davenport; Susannah Harker; Idris Elba; Philip Quast
- Composer: Sue Hewitt
- Country of origin: United Kingdom
- Original language: English
- No. of series: 1
- No. of episodes: 6

Production
- Running time: 300 minutes (approx.)
- Production company: World Productions

Original release
- Network: Channel 4
- Release: 15 September – 20 October 1998

Ultraviolet is a 1998 British television series written and directed by Joe Ahearne and starring Jack Davenport, Susannah Harker, Idris Elba, and Philip Quast. The music was composed and performed by Sue Hewitt. The programme was produced by World Productions for Channel 4.

== Synopsis ==
In the near future, threats to stability like global warming, has caused vampires (referred to throughout as "Code Fives", or "Leeches"; the term "vampire" is never used) to attempt covert domination of the earth. Detective Sergeant Michael Colefield (Jack Davenport) discovers that his best friend Jack (Stephen Moyer) has gone missing on the night before his wedding. Investigating Jack's disappearance leads Michael into the path of a secret paramilitary organization (known as "Section V") supported by the British government and the Vatican. Michael learns that Jack has become a Code Five. Michael remains devoted to his friend and abhors the brutal methods used by the organization's agents – including Vaughn Rice (Idris Elba) – until he realizes that Jack is lying about his situation and that the Section V's are correct in their assessment of the Code Fives. He allows himself to be recruited by the organization, but he hopes to find a middle ground.

Over the course of the series, Michael and the organization investigate Code Five-related activity, often involving medical experimentation. Individual cases involve a woman who may be pregnant with a Code Five fetus, a test subject with synthetic blood, and the outbreak of a disease related to vampirism. The Code Fives are organized, and appear to be moving toward a common goal; the organization must determine what their agenda is. Living and working in the shadows takes a personal toll on the organization's agents: Michael's relationship with Jack's fiancée (Colette Brown) is threatened by his need to hide the truth from her; Angie Marsh (Susannah Harker) must come to terms with the loss of her husband, who was killed by the organization after becoming a Code Five; Fr. Pearse Harman (Philip Quast) is diagnosed with terminal cancer, but fears that leaving his post may doom the world to whatever fate the Code Fives have in store for it.

The final episode reveals that the Code Five's plan does not involve enslaving humanity as suspected. Instead, they plan to cause a nuclear winter, providing long-lasting darkness, and completely wiping out the threat of humanity with an engineered plague. Scientific advances made during their experiments will allow them to survive on synthetic blood and reproduce via live birth, eliminating the need for human victims.

== Characters ==
=== Main characters ===
- Michael Colefield (played by Jack Davenport)

The protagonist of the series, Michael is a Detective Sergeant at the beginning of the series with the Metropolitan Police; he is close friends and partners with his colleague Jack in CID and is due to be the best man at his wedding. One of Michael's main informants, Pollard, is shot dead by a Code Five in the first episode and this coupled with Jack's disappearance and subsequent transformation into a Code Five is the catalyst for him joining Section V. Over the course of the series, Michael must deal with balancing both the job and his personal life—he is attracted to Jack's fiance Kirsty but does not want to endanger her further.

- Dr Angela Marsh (played by Susannah Harker)

A cancer specialist and the team's resident doctor and lead scientist, Angie Marsh became involved in the organisation when her husband Robert, a prominent medical researcher, and her daughter were turned into vampires and killed by Pearse. Angie has remained extremely wary of allowing her remaining daughter, aged 11, any contact outside of home and restricts her movements outside of school. In the fifth episode of the series, she meets a Code Five acquaintance of her deceased husband who tells her that he never stopped loving her, even after his death.

- Vaughan Rice (played by Idris Elba)

The organisation's main security lead, Vaughan Rice was the sole survivor of a squad of Gulf War soldiers who had been turned by Code Fives trying to study the effects of Gulf War Syndrome. Discharged with post-traumatic stress disorder, he was quickly recruited into the organisation to help eliminate the infection. Vaughan shows very little emotion in his role, frequently referring to the Code Fives as 'leeches' and not hesitating to kill anyone who he suspects has been infected. In the fifth episode of the series, he is abducted and placed in a sealed garage with four coffins timed to open and only barely escapes with his life when he causes one to explode and break open the door.

- Pearse J. Harman (played by Philip Quast)

The leader of the organisation and a priest, Pearse has a droll and cynical personality but also provides occasional black humour to lighten the gravity of the situation. In the third episode of the series he starts to display the symptoms of cancer, which is later formally diagnosed by Angie. Despite his illness he continues to work, desperate to learn the secrets of Code Five regeneration which are finally revealed in the last episode of the series.

=== Supporting characters ===
- Kirsty (played by Colette Brown)

Jack's fiance whom she is due to marry in the first episode, Kirsty remains oblivious to Jack's fate until the final episode of the series. Throughout the series she is keen to discover the truth about Jack, first from Michael who covers up what has really happened and then with a journalist who eventually becomes a Code Five himself.

- Frances (played by Fiona Dolman)

Michael's former girlfriend and main contact on the outside. She has access to highly privileged information through her work (never specified in the series), which she often passes on to him. Michael's secretiveness about his new job, his focus on Kirsty, and his repeated demands for Frances's help eventually cause friction in their relationship. In the finale, Pearce is forced to demonstrate the existence of Code Fives to her to persuade her to cooperate with Section V.

- Jacob (played by Thomas Lockyer)

A journalist whom Kirsty enlists to help find Michael after the latter disappears. He later becomes a Code Five and entangles Kirsty in his plan to get to Michael and Section V.

== Style and themes ==
The show attempted a modern and scientific approach to vampires. It eschewed much of the supernatural elements of vampire lore. The word "vampire" is never spoken in the show. The formal term for the antagonists is "Code Fives", derived from the Roman numeral for five, V, which is also the first letter in "vampire". A slang term used is "leeches". The clandestine vampire-hunting squad uses overwhelming numbers and modern "state-of-the-art" versions of traditional anti-vampire weapons: carbon bullets instead of wooden stakes; gas grenades with concentrated allicin, a compound derived from garlic; and video cameras attached to gun-sights on firearms (for comparison) since vampires are as invisible to electronic devices as mirrors.

A prominent theme in the show is the emotional and social toll that the main characters' knowledge causes them. After joining the squad, Michael feels he must distance himself from his former friends in order to protect them. Angie March comments at one point that she's "getting a reputation as an anti-social parent" because she won't let her daughter attend social functions after dark. Vaughn Rice is in love with Angie, but cannot bring himself to tell her due to the stress of their job. At several points in the show, both Michael and a captured vampire question whether the team's methods are justified.

== Vampirism as depicted in the series ==
Code Fives in the series are depicted as ageless and immortal. They are stronger and faster than normal humans, to the extent that a physical encounter between a human and a leech will almost always be fatal for the human. Code Fives lack most of the supernatural powers attributed to vampires in folklore, such as turning into bats, mist or wolves. The folkloric lack of a reflection is extended in the series: Code Fives are invisible to electronic devices. They cannot be imaged by video cameras, and cannot be recorded on videotape or film. Their voices cannot be transmitted electronically and ink will not hold an impression of their fingerprints. Vampire DNA is invisible under an electron microscope. Vampires use voice synthesis software to communicate via telephone. They use cars with blacked-out windows in order to move outside during the day, and time-locked coffins for long-distance travel.

When neutralized Code Fives are reduced in a burst of energy to a red powdery residue; this is stored in a vault by Section V as the leech can be re-generated from it.

== Episode titles ==
1. "Habeas Corpus"
2. "In Nomine Patris"
3. "Sub Judice"
4. "Mea Culpa"
5. "Terra Incognita"
6. "Persona Non Grata"

== Legacy ==
In 2000, the American Fox network developed a version of Ultraviolet, starring Eric Thal, Joanna Going and Mädchen Amick with Idris Elba reprising his role from the British series. The American version did not progress beyond an unaired pilot episode. Howard Gordon, one of the producers contracted to develop the series, said in an interview that "we screwed it up and it just didn't come out that well". The original UK version has been screened by the Sci-Fi Channel in the US. It was shown originally as a three-part miniseries (each part being two of the original episodes shown consecutively) and during some later airings all six episodes were shown in a marathon format.

== See also ==
- Vampire film
- List of vampire television series
