= Market For Murder =

- Midsomer Murders episode
- Episode no.: Series 5 Episode 1
- Directed by: Sarah Hellings
- Written by: Andrew Payne
- Cinematography by: Steve Saunderson
- Editing by: Derek Bain
- Original air date: 16 June 2002
- Running time: 97 minutes

Guest appearances
- Jesse Birdsall (Harry Painter); Serena Gordon (Ginny Sharp); Caroline Harker (Tamsin Proctor); Rupert Vansittart (Selwyn Proctor); Dilys Laye (Vera Hopkins); Barbara Leigh-Hunt (Marjorie Empson); Christopher Ravenscroft (Dr. Rupert Bradshaw); Gerda Stevenson (Sandra Bradshaw); Anton Rodgers (Lord Chetwood); Angela Thorne (Lady; Chetwood)

Episode chronology
| ← Previous "Tainted Fruit" | Next → "A Worm in the Bud" |

"Market For Murder" is the first episode of the fifth series of Midsomer Murders and the twenty second episode overall. It stars John Nettles as Detective Chief Inspector Tom Barnaby and Daniel Casey as Detective Sergeant Gavin Troy.

== Plot ==
Stock broker Selwyn Proctor is furious when his classic car blows up outside his prestigious home in Midsomer Market. On the other hand, he would be more furious if he discovered that the reading club, of which his wife Tamsin and a group of other ladies from the village are part, is actually a group of middle-aged women investing in the stock market. These include glamorous divorcee, Ginny Sharp, local GP's wife Sandra Bradshaw, and Lady Chetwood of Chetwood House on the outskirts of the village. After one meeting, when Lady Chetwood and Mrs Proctor announce they'd like to sell their shares, the elderly head of the group is brutally battered to death with her walking stick whilst getting ready for bed that night. D.C.I. Barnaby and D.S. Troy are called in to investigate the mysterious death but don't catch the killer before more deaths occur.

== Murders ==
Throughout the episode, there are 3 murders and one attempted murder:

1. Marjorie Empson: Multiple blows to the back of her head with her walking stick after she had fallen down a flight of stairs.
2. Ginny Sharp: Whilst fishing out ashtrays placed in her swimming pool by the murderer, Ginny is struck dead by an ashtray to the head.
3. Lady Chetwood: The murderer pushes Lady Chetwood off the roof of her Stately home.

== Cast ==
- John Nettles as DCI Tom Barnaby
- Daniel Casey as Sergeant Gavin Troy
- Jane Wymark as Joyce Barnaby
- Jesse Birdsall as Harry Painter
- Eamon Geoghegan as Barman
- Serena Gordon as Ginny Sharp
- Caroline Harker as Tamsin Proctor
- Barry Jackson as Dr. George Bullard
- Dilys Laye as Vera Hopkins
- Barbara Leigh-Hunt as Marjorie Empson
- Christopher Ravenscroft as Dr. Rupert Bradshaw
- Anton Rodgers as Lord James Chetwood
- Jay Smith as Police Technician
- Gerda Stevenson as Sandra Bradshaw
- Angela Thorne as Lady Lavinia Chetwood
- Rupert Vansittart as Selwyn Proctor
- Catherine Bott as Solo Voice
