= Perfect Parents =

2006 British television film

- DVD cover
- Directed by: Joe Ahearne
- Starring: Christopher Eccleston; Susannah Harker; Madeleine Garrood; Lesley Manville; David Warner
- Country of origin: United Kingdom
- Original language: English

Production
- Running time: 92 minutes
- Production company: ITV Studios

Original release
- Release: 28 December 2006

Perfect Parents is a fictional 2006 British TV film written and directed by Joe Ahearne and produced by ITV Productions. It portrays the dramatic story of a young girl named Lucy (Madeleine Garrood) that was brought up by her atheist parents, Stuart (Christopher Eccleston) and Alison (Susannah Harker) and their ensuing navigation of the ethical dilemmas that arose in their extreme efforts to secure her acceptance into a prestigious Catholic educational institution.

The satirical film directed by Joe Ahearne outlines the prevalence of an increasing prioritisation of our children's education and protectionist parenting strategies in modern society. It emphasises the extreme lengths that parents will resort to in order to enable their child to be educated at prestigious schools such as St Mary of the Veil and to ensure a safe learning environment for them. The dichotomy of absolute and relative morality is examined in the film through a series of dubious parenting decisions surrounding the educational development of their child with no clear ethical pejoratives provided for the audience's discernment.

The British film experienced great success in the Italian market and was awarded the most prestigious award at the Roma Fiction Fest in Italy. It was a significant achievement for the duo of Joe Ahearne and Christopher Eccleston, wherein they previously collaborated together on the first season of Doctor Who as director and actor of the show. Additionally, Christopher Eccleston, who played the role of Stuart in the film, claimed the best actor prize respectively.

== Plot ==
Lucy witnesses a knife fight at her public school. She was only footsteps away from the scene of violence and her parents Stuart and Alison fear for her safety. and search for a safer and well-renown school. Lucy has been raised as an atheist but her parents decide the only school they can only afford is St Mary of the Veil, which is managed by a group of nuns with a preference for traditional Catholic families to maintain their exclusivity, given the lengthy enrolment waiting lists.

Thus, as part of their deliberate strategy, the entire family began to exercise the Catholic faith superficially with the core intent on progressing their child's application to an esteemed Catholic school. Their satirical attempt to depict themselves as devout Catholic believers was highly effective and assisted the progression and success of their daughter's entrance to the desired educational institution. She eventually ended up at the desired Catholic school, St Mary of the Veil. Their pursuit of enrolment into a prestigious educational institution for their beloved daughter led the couple into a life filled with lies, deceit and violence.

It initially seemed as though the white lie would bear little consequence. However, to adequately prepare for a frightening interview with the school’s harsh principal, known as Sister Estonia, they posed as a devout Catholic family and used their questionable religious connections through their friend Eddie to identify a Catholic priest that they may bribe for a parishioner reference for their school application. However, that event is the beginning of many more decisions that are plagued with fraud, blackmail and violence as they navigate the questions of morality. It satirises the emerging global phenomenon in which parents are going to increasingly extreme lengths to ensure that their children are able to receive entry to highly competitive schools and also the priceless value in their child's safety regardless of the moral implications that may follow. As a late show twist, after Stuart and Alison enlist the assistance of the Catholic priest, the costly price of securing admission into a prestigious emerged with past stories about the priest’s dark secrets – but it may be too late to avoid the consequences.

== Production ==
Director Joe Ahearne is a British film producer best known for his previous role in directing BBC's Doctor Who. His direction of the satirical TV film earned him multiple awards at the 2007 Rome Fiction Festival.

== Cast ==
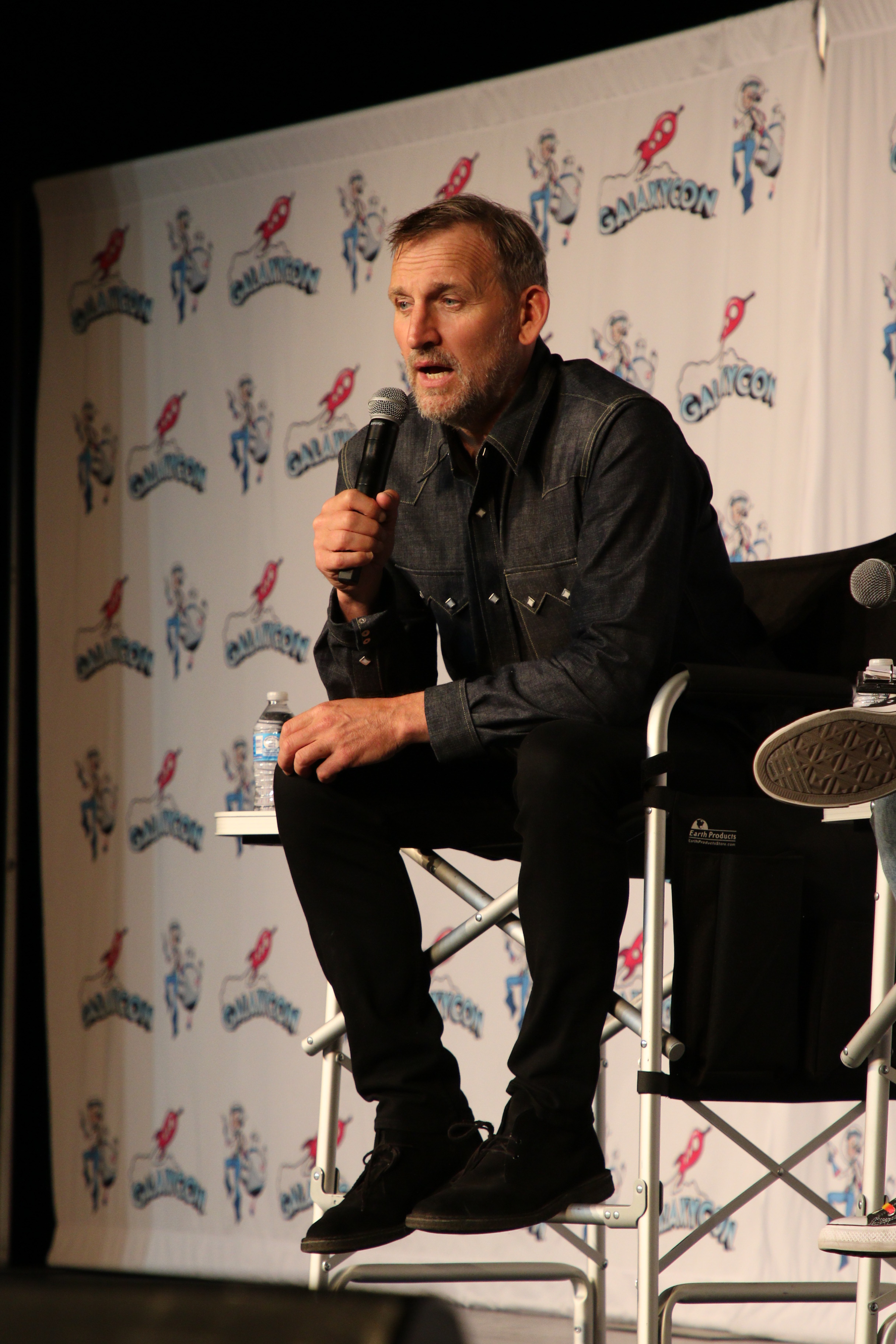
Christopher Eccleston

Christopher Eccleston as Stuart/Lucy's Father:

Perfect Parents marked his return to acting where he plays the role of a tender and loving parent that is a combination of wit, ingenuity and moral ambiguity. Eccleston's on-screen character Stuart is wedded to Alison and they have a daughter named Lucy whom they deeply cherish. The character's evolution saw the narrative shift was ethical parenting to seemingly benevolent love before settling on repeated instances of moral ambiguity.

Eccleston was the third son of working-class parents and was raised in Salford prior to featuring in his first BBC drama series Our Friends in the North in 1996. Prior to this film, Eccleston rose to prominence in Doctor Who, but made a shocking and abrupt exit after one season on the TV series. Despite only appearing on the show for 13 episodes, it was a hugely successful series that catapulted him into stardom despite his disagreements with the then TV show director Russell T Davies.

Susannah Harker as Alison/Lucy's Mother:

Harker plays the role of Alison who is Lucy's mother in Perfect Parents, where she is likewise to Stuart a caring parent with initially benevolent intentions to secure entry to one of the most prestigious Catholic schools in the region. However, the ethical facade quickly evaporates as she navigates the bent boundaries of moral ambiguity relating to their parenting decisions regarding the future of Lucy's education. Many ethical borders were crossed but eventually, those decisions catch up to haunt her and Stuart when they discover more of the unknown.

Prior to this film, she was well-known for her performance as Mattie Storin in House of Cards, in which she was nominated for a BAFTA TV Award in 1990. However, her most renown performance was her role as Jane Bennet in Pride and Prejudice.

Madeleine Garrood as Lucy/Stuart and Alison's Daughter:

Perfect Parents was her debut TV film appearance where she plays the role of Lucy, the prominent schoolgirl and beloved daughter of Stuart and Alison. As an innocent and filial daughter, she witnessed a range of morally dubious decisions to which she remained silent, not knowing whether to apply her ethical conscience or to be filial and obedient to her parents. The ethical imbalance is pervasive throughout the film and her sustained silence fuels the film's moral ambiguity. Subsequently, she featured in an American TV documentary titled Lusitania: Murder on the Atlantic as Avis Dolphin, which dramatised the notorious World War I U-boat attack on the British passenger liner, RMS Lusitania. Since then she has taken an indefinite hiatus from acting and filmography.

Lesley Manville as Sister Estonia/Catholic School Principal:

In the British TV film, she played the character of the strict school principal, known as Sister Estonia of the esteemed Catholic high school. Her character symbolised the ethical imperative of society as she acted as the final barrier upholding ethical parenting and enrolment. Sister Estonia upheld the high standards of the school but despite her vigilant efforts, there were still loopholes that were successfully exploited to ensure Lucy's entry into the esteemed educational institution.

Manville has received multiple BAFTA TV Award nominations throughout her career but her breakthrough came in theatre, where she was the recipient of the Critics Circle Award for Best Actress and Olivier Award for Best Actress.

David Warner as Father Thomas/Catholic Priest

In this film, he is an English actor that played the role of Father Thomas, the Catholic priest that fraudulently authorises a letter to verify the Catholic faith of Stuart and Alison to enable their successful application to the Catholic school for their daughter Lucy. He represents the recent subversion of ethical values in the Catholic institution, which is a religion that prides itself on absolute standards of morality. The recent global ramifications of priestly sins and iniquities have cast a shadow of doubt over the religion and Father Thomas characterises the ethical problems that remain within the Catholic Church.

Prior to this film, Warner had played a range of different characters ranging from romantic leads to villains across the film and TV industries, where his performance in the Titanic as Spicer Lovejoy earned him the nomination for the Screen Actors Guild Award for Outstanding Performance by a Cast in a Motion Picture.

== Social Impact and Moral Implications ==
The TV film provides a satirical perspective of the ethical issues that have plagued the global Catholic Church in the past few decades. It depicts several instances where Father Thomas (David Warner) makes questionable decisions regarding the briberies and immoral signing of letters of faith for Atheist parents. However, the sustained ambiguity forces the audience to create their own ethical conclusion as the statement of their false faith cannot be verified or substantiated.

Perfect Parents also challenges the ethical parameters which are often breached when securing educational entry for children, such as blatant acts of lying and bribery of religious figures within the film by Stuart and Alison (Lucy's parents). It challenges the current state of societal ethics pertaining to our pursuits of our children's educational future.

== Music ==
The film's soundtrack was composed by Murray Gold, a British composer who was best known for his previous contributions to BBC's Doctor Who.

== Reception ==
Awards and Accolades

The TV film received the following awards and accolades at the inauguration of the Rome Fiction Festival in 2007:

- Winner: Maximo Diamond Award
  - Perfect Parents shared the award with the Italian film Canale 5 Maria Montessori, directed by Gianluca Tavarelli.
- Winner: Best TV Movie
  - The film achieved the top prize largely attributed to the exceptional performances by Christopher Eccleston and Susannah Harker.
- Winner: Best TV Movie Script
- Winner: Best TV Actor

=== Critical Response ===
On Rotten Tomatoes it has an approval rating of 80%.

The performances of cast members were frequently discussed in critical reviews. Specifically, Christopher Eccleston's depiction of Stuart/Lucy's Father received positive accolades from film commentators. These positive reviews translated into Christopher Eccleston being awarded the 'Best TV Actor' at the inaugural Roma Fiction Fest in 2007 (see above). The directorship of Joe Ahearne was also applauded, which corresponded with two awards also being awarded for the 'Best TV movie' and 'Best TV Movie Script' at the same festival.
