= Kavanagh QC =

British television drama series (1995–2001)

- Created by: Susan Rogers and Ted Childs
- Starring: John Thaw; Oliver Ford Davies; Nicholas Jones; Cliff Parisi; Lisa Harrow; Tom Brodie; Daisy Bates
- Theme music composer: Anne Dudley(series one); John E. Keane
- Country of origin: United Kingdom
- Original language: English
- No. of series: 5 (+ 1 special)
- No. of episodes: 27 (list of episodes)

Production
- Executive producer: Ted Childs
- Producer: Chris Kelly
- Running time: 90 mins.(Series 1–5); 120 mins.(Series 6)
- Production company: Central Television

Original release
- Network: ITV
- Release: 3 January 1995 – 25 April 2001

Kavanagh QC is a British television series made by Central Television for ITV between 3 January 1995 and 25 April 2001. All five series are available on DVD in both Region 1 and Region 2.

== Plot ==
The series starred John Thaw as barrister James Kavanagh QC, who comes from a working-class upbringing in Bolton, Greater Manchester. Although having been alluded to in Series 1 Episode 1, this is only revealed in later episodes as his parents' health deteriorates and through an exchange with a colleague who presumed that Kavanagh was actually a Yorkshireman. Plus, on one occasion Kavanagh dashes off to catch Bolton Wanderers play in a televised football match. The series deals with his battles in the courtroom as well as his domestic dramas which include the death of his devoted and affectionate wife. Later he begins dating a fellow barrister.

In court, Kavanagh is usually seen to be defending a client who seems likely to be convicted until a twist in the case occurs, but occasionally Kavanagh is seen in a prosecuting role. The main plot often features Kavanagh confronting cases with a subtext of racism, sexism or other prejudice. In sub-plots comedy came from the pomposity and self-absorption of Jeremy, a posh barrister in chambers. Kavanagh will not stand for injustice and is never bullied by threats or bribes from those whom he is up against in the courtroom.

== Cast ==
- John Thaw as James Kavanagh, Q.C. (Series 1–5)
- Oliver Ford Davies as Peter Foxcott, Q.C. (Series 1–5)
- Nicholas Jones as Jeremy Aldermarten, Q.C. (Series 1–5)
- Cliff Parisi as Tom Buckley (Series 1–5)
- Lisa Harrow as Lizzie Kavanagh (Series 1–3)
- Tom Brodie as Matt Kavanagh (Series 1–5)
- Daisy Bates as Kate Kavanagh (Series 1–5)
- Anna Chancellor as Julia Piper (Series 1–3)
- Jenny Jules as Alex Wilson (Series 1–4)
- Valerie Edmond as Emma Taylor (Series 4)
- Arkie Whiteley as Helen Ames (Series 2–3)
- Geraldine James as Eleanor Harker, Q.C. (Series 1–5)

== Episode list ==
Several online sources list two additional episodes in series four: 7. "Ceremony of Innocence" (28 April 1998) and 8. "Seasons of Mist" (5 May 1998), the plot descriptions of which are identical to two episodes broadcast in series five: 3. "Time of Need" (22 March 1999) and 4. "End Games" (29 March 1999). This was due to a scheduling change which prevented these two episodes from airing at their scheduled time. Later broadcast as part of series five, they were re-titled to avoid confusion.

=== Series overview ===
Series	Episodes	Originally released	
Series	Episodes	First released	Last released
1	4	3 January 1995	24 January 1995
2	6	26 February 1996	1 April 1996
3	6	3 April 1997	17 April 1997
4	6	17 March 1998	21 April 1998
5	4	8 March 1999	29 March 1999
Special	1	25 April 2001	

=== Series 1 (1995) ===
No. overall	No. in series	Title	Directed by	Written by	Original release date	Viewers (millions)
1	1	"Nothing but the Truth"	Colin Gregg	Russell Lewis	3 January 1995	N/A
Successful but over-worked barrister James Kavanagh defends David Armstrong (played by Ewan McGregor in an early role), a Cambridge student of impeccable background, who is accused of rape by Eve Kendall (Alison Steadman), the wife of his employer. Eve's husband Alan (David Cardy) is having an affair and she is lonely, which, at first sight, makes her seem to be a fantasist fabricating a consensual happening, which is Kavanagh's line of defence. However he also has to face the fact that his wife Lizzie, upset by her husband's workaholism, is having an affair with a colleague.
2	2	"Heartland"	Colin Gregg	Russell Lewis	10 January 1995	N/A
Kavanagh prosecutes a former police officer who hit and seriously injured a teenager with his car in Sunderland, leaving the boy with serious brain damage. The youngster's mother believes the ex-cop has turned vigilante and that the incident wasn't an accident – he was aiming to kill. The mother's appeal persuades Kavanagh, despite lack of sufficient evidence, but he finds there's more to it all than meets the eye and sets about proving that the police are not always on the right side of the law.
3	3	"A Family Affair"	Renny Rye	Adrian Hodges	17 January 1995	N/A
Michael Duggan (George Costigan) has received an eight-month sentence for kidnapping his own son. Kavanagh defended him and now Duggan's ex-wife and her new husband are seeking a court order banning all contact between him and the child. The case takes a turn when Duggan reveals to his solicitor that the boy's stepfather is abusing him. In a separate case, Kavanagh is prosecuting a pornographer whose defence is that her work is art. At home, Kavanagh faces the inevitable when daughter Kate wants her boyfriend to spend the night. In Chambers, Aldermarten considers running for Parliament and asks a special favor from Julia.
4	4	"The Sweetest Thing"	Paul Greengrass	Adrian Hodges	24 January 1995	N/A
Kavanagh defends Annie Lewis (Anastasia Hille), a high class prostitute accused of killing an entrepreneur who had a reputation for being a risk-taker and who regularly enjoyed the company of paid escorts. Annie claims she is innocent and refuses a plea bargain offered by the prosecution. The defence challenges the testimony of witnesses who claim to have seen her leaving the hotel just prior to the murder, though she claims to have left several hours before. On the home front, Kavanagh is concerned about the future of his marriage when he learns Lizzie may get a senior level civil service appointment in Strasbourg and daughter Kate, who is about to leave for university, is having boyfriend problems. In Chambers, Jeremy is at his chauvinistic best when he initially refuses Julia's request to play in the annual cricket match.

=== Series 2 (1996) ===
No. overall	No. in series	Title	Directed by	Written by	Original release date	Viewers (millions)
5	1	"True Commitment"	Andrew Grieve	Adrian Hodges	26 February 1996	N/A
Kavanagh finds himself defending a left-leaning protester accused of stabbing a skinhead at a protest march. The accused claims that it was entirely his fault, but when he hears that his upper middle class girlfriend has shopped him to the police, he changes his story saying he was just being chivalrous and that it was his girlfriend who did the stabbing. Meanwhile, Kavanagh's long-distance relationship with his wife begins to take its toll when he discovers Kate is having an affair with her married tutor. Guest: David Schneider as Martin Haslam
6	2	"Men of Substance"	Charles Beeson	Matthew Hall	4 March 1996	N/A
Kavanagh finds himself prosecuting a case for HM Customs. The case is anything but straightforward however. While 15 kilos of heroin were seized being smuggled in condemned meat, there is no physical or forensic evidence linking the drugs to any of the accused. One of them, Kevin Gregson (Jonny Phillips), may have eliminated a witness in a previous case and he seems true to form when Kavanagh and his wife are threatened. Kavanagh suspects that not all is on the up and up as far as the evidence is concerned.
7	3	"The Burning Deck"	Charles Beeson	Russell Lewis	11 March 1996	N/A
Kavanagh defends Lt. Ralph Kinross (Rupert Penry-Jones), who is accused of starting a fire in his barracks. His co-accused is MEM Patrick Jones (Alan Gilchrist), a childhood friend who is a sailor in the same unit, who had loaned money to the sailor whose bed was set on fire. Eleanor defends Jones, but problems at home begin to impair her judgement. The defence focuses on the role of Chief Evans, the senior rating in charge of the engineering department, who was also Jones' main tormentor. In Chambers, Julia receives a proposal of marriage.
8	4	"A Sense of Loss"	Colin Gregg	Matthew Hall	18 March 1996	N/A
Kavanagh and Julia Piper defend Paul Warwick (Rúaidhrí Conroy), a teenager charged with killing a policewoman while robbing a newsagent's store. Paul confessed to the crimes at interview, but he now says that on the night in question he was at home with his single mother and his young disabled brother, and refuses to help Kavanagh with his defence. Under cross-examination, there proves to be more to the case than first meets the eye, and the credibility of the police team involved starts to break down.
9	5	"A Stranger in the Family"	Andrew Grieve	Paul Hines	25 March 1996	N/A
Kavanagh has not argued a personal injury case for twenty years, but he agrees to lead in a case against the Thames River Recycling Centre, where an employee suffered brain damage and spinal injuries after being hit by a heavy container swinging through the air. As he heads to court to secure a fair settlement from the insurance company for the family, he discovers that the case is much more complex than he first imagined. Meanwhile, Kavanagh's son wants his father to buy him a car.
10	6	"Job Satisfaction"	Charles Beeson	Russell Lewis	1 April 1996	N/A
Kavanagh faces the most complex case of his career: a man and his sister appear to have murdered their father, a farmer, and his second wife. Kavanagh represents the sister while the man represents himself.

=== Series 3 (1997) ===
No. overall	No. in series	Title	Directed by	Written by	Original release date	Viewers (millions)
11	1	"Mute of Malice"	Jack Gold	Charles Wood	3 March 1997	N/A
Kavanagh's defence of an army chaplain accused of killing his brother is made all the more difficult by the fact that his client is found to be mute of malice and refuses to speak. Is he simply being uncooperative, or has the trauma of service in Bosnia rendered him mute? Meanwhile, Aldermarten faces traumas of his own when the judge involved in his case has a nervous breakdown.
12	2	"Blood Money"	Jack Gold	Matthew Hall	10 March 1997	N/A
When her husband dies in the operating theatre following a car crash, Sarah Meadows (Sheila Hancock, Thaw's wife) believes there is a case of negligence. With Jeremy Aldermarten (Nicholas Jones) representing the hospital, Kavanagh agrees to take on her case, despite his misgivings as to the likelihood of winning. The surgeon left the theatre before closure, but at a point when the patient was doing well. In Chambers, Kavanagh is asked to speak to one of his colleagues over her behavior. At home Kavanagh and his wife are disappointed when son Matt fails his A-level exams.
13	3	"Ancient History"	Tristram Powell	Nigel Kneale	17 March 1997	N/A
Kavanagh prosecutes an apparently blameless family doctor in an unprecedented war crimes trial and finds himself wondering about the fallibility of human memory after fifty years. The court hears devastating testimony, as victims of Nazi atrocities relive their experiences of concentration camps. Kavanagh asks his son to do some research.
14	4	"Diplomatic Baggage"	Ken Grieve	Douglas Watkinson	24 March 1997	N/A
Natasha Jackson (Lena Headey) is the daughter of the UK's ambassador-designate to Austria, Sir Alan Jackson (Michael Feast). She is charged with murder in the death of Lisa Aeurbach (Tamsin Hollo), a journalist. Natasha's defence is that the woman was dead when she arrived for an interview. The case takes an interesting twist when Kavanagh, who is defending Natasha, is approached by a mysterious government official whose only concern is to keep HM's ambassador-designate as far away from scandal as possible. Matt decides to move out on his own and his parents are surprised to learn he's sharing a flat with two attractive young women. In Chambers, Peter Foxcott takes an interest in an old friend he has not seen for many years.
15	5	"The Ties that Bind"	Charles Beeson	Edward Canfor-Dumas	7 April 1997	N/A
Kavanagh agrees to take on a private prosecution against Ian Vincent who is believed to have beaten 17-year-old Graham Foster (George Russo) to death for having stolen a briefcase from his car. Vincent's stepfather, Ron Baab (David Schofield), heads a crime family and tries to buy everyone off with both money and veiled threats. There is little solid evidence and the case relies primarily on Graham's girlfriend who has also been threatened. In Chambers meanwhile, Aldermarten is anxiously awaiting the results of his application to join an exclusive gentlemen's club in which Peter Foxcott is a member.
16	6	"In God We Trust"	Charles Beeson	Russell Lewis	14 April 1997	N/A
Kavanagh finds himself in Florida assisting his one-time pupil Julia Piper-Robinson (Anna Chancellor) in preparing an appeal for an inmate who is on death row and awaiting execution in the electric chair. It is apparent that his original defence was badly handled from the start. Many facts were left unchallenged by the defence and no mitigation was offered at the sentencing stage despite his limited emotional development and abuse-laden upbringing. When Julia goes into premature labour, Kavanagh finds himself actually pleading the case and uncovering the true nature of what happened. At home meanwhile, Lizzie Kavanagh learns some distressing news from her doctors but waits until her husband's return to tell him.

=== Series 4 (1998) ===
No. overall	No. in series	Title	Directed by	Written by	Original release date	Viewers (millions)
17	1	"Memento Mori"	Charles Beeson	Russell Lewis	17 March 1998	N/A
Following Lizzie's death, Kavanagh takes on the case of a doctor, Felix Crawley (Tom Courtenay), charged with killing his depressive and unfaithful wife Ann (Janet Maw) with an overdose of lithium. The doctor claims he has treated Ann in secret because of the shame of her disorder and the death was accidental. Kavanagh takes on prosecution witnesses, including Ann's lover and her young niece, whose advances Felix spurned, and, as the case draws to its verdict, comes to appreciate that he is identifying with his bereaved client.
18	2	"Care in the Community"	Jack Gold	Rob Heyland	24 March 1998	N/A
Kavanagh and chambers head Peter Foxcott go to Kavanagh's home town, Bolton, where Foxcott is defending Debbie Sattenthwaite (Cathy Sara) and Kavanagh is defending Mark Holmes (Sean Harris), charged with killing their fourteen-month-old daughter. Unfortunately, the couple's evidence suddenly starts to clash as Mark changes his story and Foxcott is shocked at the way Kavanagh goes for Debbie, requiring his intervention to assist his colleague.
19	3	"Briefs Trooping Gaily"	Peter Smith	Charles Wood	31 March 1998	N/A
Kavanagh, who is still mourning his wife's death, has to defend a woman charged with killing her abusive husband. Despite having a good case for manslaughter, she seems determined to plead guilty to murder. Meanwhile Jeremy is torn between the demands of his lead role in a Gilbert & Sullivan production, and a charge of professional misconduct for looking at a defence brief.
20	4	"Bearing Witness"	Peter Smith	Edward Canfor-Dumas	7 April 1998	N/A
Kavanagh's personal views and professional pride clash when his clerk Tom asks him to represent Tom's former girlfriend Susannah Emmott (Deborah Findlay). After they split she was briefly married to a Jehovah's Witness, whose beliefs she took on before he left her and the faith. She has a son, Luke (Joe Roberts), aged thirteen, whose father knows nothing of him and who needs a life-saving blood transfusion, which is against Susannah's religious beliefs. Kavanagh may find himself on the other side of the courtroom. Jeremy gets himself involved with a group of tree-huggers out to save local woodlands.
21	5	"Innocency of Life"	Ferdinand Fairfax	Malcolm Bradbury	14 April 1998	N/A
Kavanagh is asked by the Bishop of Norfolk to defend a young vicar in an ecclesiastical court. Rev Ian Winfarthing (Matt Bardock) has been accused by pub landlady Anne Murchison (Susan Vidler) of sexual harassment, but when Anne is charged with killing her drunken, bullying husband, Tom (Cliff Parisi), accounts of what has been going on in the small town begin to change. Jeremy dates a glamorous aristocrat, throwing her over when she makes it plain that she wants a child, but later he is chagrined to discover he has dumped one of the top rich people in the country. Kate sits finals at Cambridge, and while on the case, Kavanagh rekindles his friendship with prosecuting counsel Eleanor Harker (Geraldine James), with whom he shares a romantic weekend in a storm-tossed chartered sailboat.
22	6	"Dead Reckoning"	Charles Beeson	Andy de la Tour	21 April 1998	N/A
Kavanagh goes to Yorkshire fishing port Stainmouth to prosecute Roy Lawrence Kenneth Cranham) for negligence after his apparently unseaworthy trawler sank, claiming five lives including Roy's son Paul. The defence claims that a submarine collided with the boat, a claim that becomes more and more likely. Roy is popular in the bereaved community and even Emma, Kavanagh's junior, feels sorry for him, but Kavanagh believes Roy had his own agenda and is not the philanthropist he seems. He also averts a chambers crisis by dissuading Tom from leaving.

=== Series 5 (1999) ===
No. overall	No. in series	Title	Directed by	Written by	Original release date	Viewers (millions)
23	1	"Previous Convictions"	Tristram Powell	Stephen Churchett	8 March 1999	10.67m
An RAF Jet Provost trainer crashes into a crowded moto-cross event killing 22 people. One of these is a friend of Kavanagh's son. The RAF Corporal responsible for maintenance commits suicide, pinning the blame on his lover, Charlotte Sinclair (Amanda Ryan). She is tried for theft and conspiracy to murder. Sabotage or human error? Kavanagh has to defend her and uncover documents initially denied to the Court. The episode ends with a magic trick and poetry recitation at a celebratory dinner at the Middle Temple.
24	2	"The More Loving One"	David Thacker	Peter Moffatt	15 March 1999	10.29m
In London, a house explodes killing Annie Fisk (Laura Heath), a heroin addict. Her boyfriend Michael Woodley (Hugh Dancy), a former addict and convicted arsonist, is looking through the letter-box at the same time smoking a cigarette. He tells the first two people he sees "I killed her." Gas leak or murder? Kavanagh has to defend him. Elsewhere, Miss Miller is sent to Romford defending a pit bull terrier, before returning to London to be Kavanagh’s Junior in the murder case. Aldermarten has to take over. Next thing he knows he’s buying a third of a greyhound and everyone goes to see it race.
25	3	"Time of Need"	David Thacker	Andy De La Tour	22 March 1999	9.56m
A senior Labour MP, Home Officer Minister Barbara Watkins (Penelope Wilton), is accused of sexual abuse by petty criminal Philip Boxer (Brian McCardie). The alleged incident had taken place fifteen years earlier, in Hastings, when Boxer was only 15 years of age. When the case comes to court, Kavanagh defends Watkins and she is found innocent of any wrongdoing. But when she is later sacked from the government, Kavanagh helps her sue the police for compensation, on the grounds of malicious prosecution. Kavanagh gives a rapier-like cross-examination technique in the quest for truth.
26	4	"End Game"	Tristram Powell	Stephen Churchett	29 March 1999	9.39m
In November 1985, a robbery at Turnbrook Services goes wrong and a pregnant teacher and young boy are killed. The following year, three men are sentenced to life imprisonment, with a minimum of between 15 and 23 years in jail. Kavanagh was a Junior for the flawed defence. The firer of the final shot commits suicide in 1992, leaving a note admitting one of the men was innocent. Hunger strikes and petitions to Home Secretaries follow. Finally, 12 years after the initial murder, Kavanagh and Miss Miller act for one of the men, Cracken, at his appeal. Aldermarten will defend the other. Peter Foxcott decides to retire after a health scare. Kavanagh is offered the job of Head of Chambers at River Court Chambers. Afterwards, Kavanagh and Eleanor go for a weekend in "raffish" Brighton, but decide to part as friends as she is to become a Prosecutor for the International War Crimes Tribunal for Yugoslavia in the Hague.

=== Special (2001) ===
No. overall	No. in series	Title	Directed by	Written by	Original release date	Viewers (millions)
27	1	"The End of Law"	Jack Gold	Stephen Churchett	25 April 2001	8.25m
Kavanagh is sitting as a Recorder at Southwark Crown Court. Lord Cranston (Nicholas Le Prevost) pops in for a conversation during a trial for shoplifting. Would he like to become a Judge? He asks Foxcott and his daughter for advice. Elsewhere, Aldermarten is prosecuting Harry Hatton (Robert Pickavance) for the murder of Katya Zimanyi (Rachel Woolrich), a Hungarian escort in the Mortimer Hotel. The defendant is served by Miss Swithen (Samantha Bond), a Solicitor Advocate. After losing the trial she asks Kavanagh for help with the appeal, but passes out after a diabetic attack. But Lord Cranston asks him not to get too involved – so of course he takes on the appeal. Soon a miscarriage of justice starts to look like a state cover-up involving the intelligence community. Kavanagh is given the alternatives of the appeal or being sworn in as a Judge. Note: This was the last regular TV appearance of John Thaw in Kavanagh QC as he would later appear in the final two TV roles in The Glass as Jim Proctor and Hidden Treasure as Harry Jenkins prior to his death on 21 February 2002 aged 60.

== Influence ==
Labour MP and Lord Chancellor since 2024, Shabana Mahmood, has credited the example of the programme for encouraging her to enter the legal profession.
