= Ted Childs =

British television producer, screenwriter, and director

- Born: Edward Samuel Childs; 26 December 1934 (age 91); Hackney, London, England
- Occupations: Television producer, screenwriter, and director

Ted Childs is a British television producer, screenwriter, and director.

== Career ==
Childs commenced training as a programme director with ABC Weekend TV in 1962. He went on to produce and direct a wide variety of factual programmes and documentary films, including episodes of This Week, the then ITV current affairs flagship, and also contributed to the acclaimed series The World at War.

He was one of the founders of Euston Films, the film production company established by Thames Television in the early 1970s. Whilst there he produced The Sweeney, Special Branch and the Quatermass series, together with a number of theatrical and television films, as well as writing and/or directing films and series episodes for both ITV and the BBC.

In 1984, Childs was appointed Controller of Drama at Central Independent Television and, subsequently, Managing Director of Central Films. In this dual role, he acted as executive producer on an extensive range of films and series for ITV. These included Inspector Morse, Boon The Bretts, Soldier Soldier, Peak Practice, Sharpe, Cadfael, Chancer, Gone to The Dogs, Kavanagh QC and Thief Takers.

Following the acquisition of Central Television by Carlton Communications, Childs opted to assume a freelance role. He continued to write and develop new television drama and films as an executive producer. As such, he was responsible for the series Heat of the Sun, the Inspector Morse episode The Wench Is Dead, the television films Into the Blue, Goodnight Mister Tom and The Waiting Time, together with a Kavanagh QC film special, the Monsignor Renard series, and The Remorseful Day, the final episode of Inspector Morse. From 2004 to 2005 he was responsible for developing The Brief, a legal series, on which he acted as executive producer on two series. He also acted as executive producer on Lewis, a spin-off series from Inspector Morse.

In October 2012 Ted Childs was the very special guest at a 43tv Retro TV Sweeney Meet in Twickenham, where he gave a lunchtime talk about his career in TV & Film and also answered questions from members of 43tv.

== Awards ==
In 1991, The Production Guild honoured Childs with its annual Award of Merit, and he was elected a Fellow of the Royal Television Society. He was Chairman of the British Academy of Film and Television Arts (BAFTA) in 1994 and 1995. He received the RTS Award for outstanding creative contribution to British Television in 1995. In the same year he was awarded the RTS Baird Medal for outstanding contribution to British regional television. In the 1997 New Year's Honours List, he was made an OBE for services to broadcast television. Also, in 1997, he was elected an Honorary Fellow of the Moving Image Society (formerly the British Kinematograph and Television Society.) In May 1998, he received BAFTA's Alan Clarke award for outstanding creative contribution to television. In 2000, he received the Broadcasting Press Guild's Harvey Lee Award for outstanding contribution to broadcasting.

In July 2015, the University of Nottingham awarded him the honorary degree of Doctor of Letters.
