= Richard Attree =

British TV and film composer

Richard Attree is a British TV and film composer. He attended Highgate School, and then studied electronic music at the Royal College of Music following a degree in computer science. Whilst completing these studies he played as a keyboard player with various bands. He also worked as a freelance composer, producing music for dance and theatre productions at the London Contemporary Dance Theatre and Royal National Theatre. In 1987, he became the last composer to be recruited at the BBC Radiophonic Workshop, where he remained until the department's closure. During his time at the BBC, he received two Sony Awards, in 1986 and 1989, for "the Most Creative Use of Radio".

Following his departure from the BBC, he returned to freelance work.

Attree's credits include music for Horizon, Wildlife on One, Timewatch, Hardware, Watt on Earth, and the first three series of The Demon Headmaster. He has also produced music for various BBC idents and promos.
