= List of Midsomer Murders characters =

This is a list of characters that appear in the ITV British murder mystery series Midsomer Murders since 23 March 1997: John Nettles (DCI Tom Barnaby), Daniel Casey (DS Gavin Troy), Jane Wymark (Joyce Barnaby), Laura Howard (Cully Barnaby), Barry Jackson (Dr George Bullard), Jason Hughes (DS Ben Jones), John Hopkins (DS Daniel Scott), Kirsty Dillon (WPC Gail Stephens), Neil Dudgeon (DCI John Barnaby), Fiona Dolman (Sarah Barnaby), Nick Hendrix (DS Jamie Winter), Manjinder Virk (Dr Kam Karimore), Annette Badland (Dr Fleur Perkins), Tamzin Malleson (Dr Kate Wilding) and Gwilym Lee (DS Charlie Nelson).

== Overview ==
Character	Actor	Series																					
Character	Actor	1	2	3	4	5	6	7	8	9	10	11	12	13	14	15	16	17	18	19	20	21	22
DCI Tom Barnaby	John Nettles	Main	Main	Main	Main	Main	Main	Main	Main	Main	Main	Main	Main	Main									
Joyce Barnaby	Jane Wymark	Main	Main	Main	Main	Main	Main	Main	Main	Main	Main	Main	Main	Main									
DS Gavin Troy	Daniel Casey	Main	Main	Main	Main	Main	Main	Main				Guest											
Dr. George Bullard	Barry Jackson	Main	Main		Main	Recurring	Main	Main	Main	Main	Main	Main	Main	Main	Main								
Dr. Dan Peterson	Toby Jones		Recurring	Main																			
DS Daniel Scott	John Hopkins							Main	Main														
DS Benjamin Jones	Jason Hughes									Main	Main	Main	Main	Main	Main	Main				Guest			
DC Gail Stephens	Kirsty Dillon										Recurring	Main	Main	Main									
DCI John Barnaby	Neil Dudgeon													Recurring	Main	Main	Main	Main	Main	Main	Main	Main	Main
Sarah Barnaby	Fiona Dolman														Main	Main	Main	Main	Main	Main	Main	Main	Main
Dr Kate Wilding	Tamzin Malleson														Recurring	Main	Main	Main					
DS Charlie Nelson	Gwilym Lee																Main	Main	Main				
Dr. Kam Karimore	Manjinder Virk																		Main	Main			
DS Jamie Winter	Nick Hendrix																			Main	Main	Main	Main
Dr. Fleur Perkins	Annette Badland																				Main	Main	Main

== Main characters ==
=== The Barnabys and their families ===
Detective Chief Inspector Thomas "Tom" Geoffrey Barnaby (John Nettles) (series 1–13)—A senior member of Causton CID, Barnaby used to work for MI6. A patient, tolerant man, Barnaby's style of investigation is methodical and fair. Barnaby is a sagacious and perceptive individual, able to recognise seemingly obscure clues. Barnaby's social life revolves around his wife Joyce and his daughter Cully, who often provide a personal connection with the crimes that he is investigating. Barnaby's parents are both deceased by the episode "Blue Herrings". In his last appearance, "Fit for Murder", we learn that his father died on his birthday, at Barnaby's current age.

Joyce Barnaby (Jane Wymark) (series 1–13)—DCI Tom Barnaby's long-suffering wife. She is tolerant of her husband, despite his being a workaholic who spent their honeymoon solving the case of the "Pimlico Poisoner", which suggests that they met in London. Joyce is an easy-going and friendly woman who likes to be involved in community activities. She has long possessed a desire to move out of their Causton home and into one of the picturesque Midsomer villages—only to be put off by the grisly murders that occur there. She's known to her family as an experimental, but not always successful, cook. Thus, Tom is often seen taking advantage of every opportunity to dine out. She married Tom in 1973 and their only child, Cully, was conceived on their honeymoon. Her parents are Muriel and Douglas.

Detective Chief Inspector John Barnaby (Neil Dudgeon) (guest: series 13; main: series 14–present)—Barnaby transferred from Brighton to Midsomer's Causton CID to replace his older cousin, Chief Inspector Tom Barnaby, when Barnaby retired. Son of Ned Barnaby, he has a degree in Psychology from Durham University, which earned him some ribbing from DS Jones when he first arrived; however, despite a rocky start, the two make a formidable team. Barnaby lives in a large country cottage with his wife Sarah, daughter Betty, and their dog Sykes (later Paddy). He first makes a guest appearance in the series 13 episode, "The Sword of Guillaume" before taking over in the series 14 premiere, "Death in the Slow Lane." Dudgeon actually made his first appearance on the show not as John Barnaby, but as womanising gardener Daniel Bolt in the series 4 opener "Garden of Death".

Sarah Barnaby (Fiona Dolman) (series 14–present)—John Barnaby's wife is the headmistress of a local secondary school. As she has a full-time career of her own (unlike Joyce), she does not figure as much in her husband's cases; and they don't have any children (until the end of the sixteenth series), although you may consider Sykes, their dog, as their child. They have a loving marriage and celebrated their fifteen-year anniversary in "Schooled for murder". Throughout the sixteenth series Sarah is pregnant and in the last episode of the series she gives birth to their first child, a daughter, called Betty.

=== Assistants/Junior Partners ===
Detective Sergeant (later Inspector) Gavin Troy (Daniel Casey) (main: series 1–7; guest: series 11)—DCI Barnaby's first assistant. Troy is bright and ambitious. Early in the series, Troy is also known for his careless driving, causing a number of near-accidents. He is less politically correct than his boss who, in the first episode, tells Troy that he is “as politically correct as a Nuremberg Rally.” For example, Troy is uncomfortable with gay people (he calls them “arse bandits”) and the elderly, whom he calls "wrinklies".

In "Market for Murder" and "Destroying Angel" Troy provides valuable insight, finding out how the killers committed the murders, so oddly it was not Barnaby who solved those cases. In "Painted in Blood", Barnaby is forbidden to take part in the investigation, but Troy supplies him with information. Later on, Barnaby is taken hostage in a bank robbery and might have died until Troy snuck in and attacked the robber, yet at the same Troy would himself have been killed had Barnaby not stepped in, but together they overpower the robber.

Troy's relationship with Barnaby is warm, and the two make a formidable pair. Troy was promoted to Inspector and transferred to Northumbria in the first episode of the seventh series, called "The Green Man". Troy makes one re-appearance in the first episode of Series 11, "Blood Wedding", to attend the wedding of Tom's daughter, Cully Barnaby (whom he once secretly kissed in the episode "Death and Dreams", which temporarily strained his relationship with Barnaby), where he met his second successor, Sgt Jones.

Detective Sergeant Daniel "Dan" Scott (John Hopkins) (series 7-8)—He is a lot cockier than his predecessor DS Troy; he is a Londoner who was not thrilled at being transferred from the Metropolitan Police Service to Midsomer, which he regards as the "sticks". His relationship with Tom was prickly at first; but it mellowed into a slightly awkward marriage of convenience, with Barnaby still disapproving of Scott's methods and Scott grudgingly starting to respect Barnaby.

In "The Straw Woman", Scott develops a love interest who is brutally murdered by being burned alive. Scott's departure from the show was abrupt. In "The House in the Woods", Barnaby describes Scott as having called him to say he was sick and thus unable to come to work. Barnaby invites Ben Jones to assist him on that case. After this incident, no more is heard from Scott, and Jones becomes the new deputy.

Detective Sergeant (later Inspector) (previously Police and Detective Constable) Benjamin "Ben" Jones (Jason Hughes) (main: series 9–15; guest: series 19)—Jones is Tom Barnaby's third junior partner, as well as being the only one to serve opposite both of the Barnaby cousins. Unlike Troy and Scott, who first appeared on the series as plain-clothed detective sergeants, Jones was a uniformed police constable when he was first introduced. Jones was first appointed as a Detective Constable, as well as Barnaby's second-in-command (after assisting Barnaby during Sgt Scott's absence), and promoted to Detective Sergeant by the end of his first series.

Jones is considerably less naive than Troy or Scott, possessing an insight into cases that neither would have. Jones was born in Wales and remarks about his love for Wales when he and Tom travel there in the episode "Death and Dust". He is a Welsh Baptist, as Barnaby calls him in "A Sacred Trust" (Series 14, Episode 7), to which Jones replies "What's wrong with that? Except the teetotalism."

He used to be a Freemason, as revealed in "King's Crystal". In the episode "Death in Chorus", Jones exhibits a remarkable vocal talent and is recruited to sing tenor in the Midsomer Worthy choir. In "Death in the Slow Lane", it is revealed that Jones was interested in replacing Tom Barnaby upon his retirement and was a little put out by his cousin, John Barnaby, being transferred to the position instead. In reality, he could not have been given the post because it would have required him to bypass the rank of inspector.

In "Murder of Innocence", it is revealed that Jones is in a relationship with firefighter Susie Bellingham. In the series 16 opener, "The Christmas Haunting", it is revealed that Jones has been promoted to Inspector and transferred to Brighton. A photo of Jones (alongside Kate Wilding, who also moved to Brighton) is shown in the series 18 opener "Habeas Corpus". DI Jones made a further appearance in episode 3 of series 19 "Last Man Out", in an undercover role - erroneously still listed in the credits as DS Ben Jones. In the end, he left Causton CID after a mini farewell party at John and Sarah Barnaby’s home at the end of episode 6 of series 15, "Schooled in Murder".

Detective Sergeant Charlie Nelson (Gwilym Lee) (series 16–18)—When Jones was promoted, he was replaced by DS Charlie Nelson. Nelson was the first Sergeant to not serve alongside Tom Barnaby. He was a lodger at Kate's house. Nelson left the series after series 18. It is stated in the first episode of series 19 that Nelson is doing an undercover course and as a result does not show signs of returning yet leading into DS Winters introduction.

Detective Sergeant Jamie Winter (Nick Hendrix) (series 19–present)— At the beginning of series 19 DS Jamie Winter arrived. It is revealed that Winter had previously crossed paths with Dr. Kam Karimore and the two develop romantic feelings towards one another.

=== Pathologists ===
Doctor George Bullard (Barry Jackson) (series 1–14)—Causton's resident pathologist. Bullard goes about his work with a professional skill and a cheery personality. He is a good friend of Tom Barnaby's and has been a regular throughout the series (save for a brief spell, when his place was taken by Dr Dan Peterson played by Toby Jones). In later episodes Bullard has often played a greater role in the plot, even making a sterling appearance in the Midsomer Worthy Choir in "Death in Chorus". In one episode he admits to the "accidental" death of his first wife while on tour at a slaughter house. At the end of "The Oblong Murders" Bullard tells John Barnaby that he's going to take some time off: "I've decided to do some fishing. Like Tom. He suggested a holiday in Ireland," which is most likely his retirement (like Tom).

Doctor Kate Wilding (Tamzin Malleson) (series 14–17)—Dr George Bullard's replacement as resident pathologist. Her confident, competent, no-nonsense approach has earned the detectives' respect. She is unmarried and is also a professor. Her parents, Giles and Laura, have appeared in one episode, "The Flying Club". In the series 18 opener, "Habeas Corpus", Wilding has left Midsomer to take up a professorship in Brighton. She is briefly seen on-screen in a photo with Ben Jones, who had previously relocated to Brighton.

Doctor Kam Karimore (Manjinder Virk) (series 18–19)—Dr Kate Wilding's replacement as resident pathologist. She said that she grew up with four red setters and a Labrador. She and DS Jamie Winter develop romantic feelings towards one another. At the end of series 19 she has taken a job in Montreal.

Doctor Fleur Perkins (Annette Badland) (series 20–present)—Dr. Kam Karimore's replacement as resident pathologist.

=== Supporting characters ===
Cully Barnaby (later Dixon) (Laura Howard) (series 1–13)— Tom and Joyce's only child takes her first name from a village on Lake Geneva in Switzerland, where she was conceived during her parents' honeymoon. An inquisitive and bold young woman, she's inherited her parents' friendly attitudes and community spirit. Early in the series, she attended Cambridge University and dated a fellow drama student, called Nico (Ed Waters). After that, she sometimes went out with and secretly flirted with DS Troy and DS Scott. She is an actress and frequently takes temporary jobs in the Midsomer area when "resting" between assignments. Like her mother, her tendency to do community work often leaves her personally involved with the murders that take place. She meets Simon Dixon (Sam Hazeldine) in "The Axeman Cometh", becomes engaged to him in "Death In A Chocolate Box", and marries him in "Blood Wedding".

Detective Constable Gail Stephens (Kirsty Dillon) (series 10–13)— a colleague of Tom Barnaby and DS Jones, who often helps them in their cases, sometimes providing valuable insight. Gail was transferred to Midsomer from Binwell. Gail is cheery but emotional, breaking down in tears when, after initially serving as a uniformed woman police constable, she was appointed as a plain-clothed CID detective. Throughout Gail's appearances, it is implied that she is on the point of having an affair with Sgt Jones, but when it came to the crunch he decided that he did not want to get too heavily involved with a colleague, after which Gail effectively snubbed him. She made her last appearance in the series 13 episode "Fit For Murder" in 2011.

Dr. Catherine "Kath" Bullard (Alwyne Taylor) (series 1–10) — the wife of forensic pathologist George Bullard and a friend of Joyce Barnaby. She is a medical physician who works at Midsomer Market Medical Centre. She makes sporadic appearances until series 10 and a cameo appearance in the series 25 episode "Lawn of the Dead" in 2025.

Sykes (Sykes) (series 14–18) joined the cast in 2011 as John Barnaby's family dog. A Jack Russell Terrier rescue dog, Sykes appeared in every episode for five years, providing warm companionship to his humans and occasional comic relief. When his real-life owners put him into retirement, series 19 opened with a scene of the Barnabys paying respect at a grave in their back garden. By the end of the episode, the family has taken in a new rescue dog, Paddy.

== Minor characters ==
Certain minor characters have appeared in more than one episode.

- Solicitor James Jocelyne (Timothy Bateson) appeared in "Written in Blood", "Death's Shadow", and "Orchis Fatalis".
- Estate agent Olive Beauvoisin (Eileen Davies) appeared in "Death's Shadow", "Dead Man’s Eleven", and "Hidden Depths" (but was credited in that particular episode only as "Estate Agent").
- Charles Jennings (Terence Corrigan) also appeared in "Death's Shadow" and "Dead Man’s Eleven".
- David Whitely (Christopher Villiers) appeared in "The Killings at Badger's Drift" and "Death's Shadow".
- Dave Hicks (Brian Capron), Mayor of Causton, appeared in "Shot at Dawn" and "The Sword Of Guillaume".
- Acting Chief Superintendent John Cotton (Nick Fletcher) appears in "Days of Misrule" and "The Dogleg Murders".
- VKK Birgitte Poulsen (Ann Eleonora Jørgensen) appears in "The Killings of Copenhagen" and "Death of the Small Coppers".

Many actors have made repeat appearances, but in different roles.

- David Bamber played John Starkey in "Dead Letters" (2006), Anthony Prideaux in "The Black Book" (2009) and Daniel Fargo in "A Dying Art" (2016).
- Desmond Barrit appeared as Jonathan Eckersley-Hyde in "Murder on St. Malley's Day" (2002) and as Raymond Clandillon in "They Seek Him Here" (2007).
- Samantha Bond appeared in three episodes: first in "Destroying Angel" (2001) and "Shot at Dawn" (2008), and again in Neil Dudgeon's debut as lead character in "Death in the Slow Lane" (2011).
- Selina Cadell played Phyllis Cadell in the pilot episode "The Killings at Badger's Drift" (1997), Eleanor Crouch in "Midsomer Life" (2008) and Venetia Butts in "Book of the Dead" (2023).
- Simon Callow appeared as Dr. Wellow in "Dead Letters" (2006) and as Vernon De Harthog in "The Curse of the Ninth" (2017).
- Nancy Carroll appeared as Antonia Wilmot in "Hidden Depths" (2005) and as Connie Bishop in "The Great and the Good" (2010).
- Charlie Condou played Jake Foley in "Bantling Boy" (2005) and Perry Fleming in "Claws Out" (2023).
- Robert Daws played Mike Spicer in "Hidden Depths" (2005), and Hamish Rafferty in "Curse of the Ninth" (2017).
- Kevin Doyle appeared as Ferdy Villiers in "Ghosts of Christmas Past" (2004), and again as Paddy Powell in "The Oblong Murders" (2011).
- Neil Dudgeon, Chief Inspector John Barnaby, appeared for the first time as Daniel Bolt a character in the episode "Garden of Death" (2000).
- Rebecca Front appeared as Reverend Martha Hillcott in "Let Us Prey" (2014) and as Lady Myrtle Bruce in "Death Strike Three" (2025)
- Serena Gordon appeared as Ginny Sharp in "Market for Murder" (2002) and Christina Finleyson in "Midsomer Life" (2008).
- Julie Graham appeared as Dr. Laura Parr in "The Sicilian Defence" (2013) and as Dixie Havergal in "A Climate of Death" (2023).
- Tony Haygarth appeared as Tyson in "Destroying Angel" (2001), Jack Tewson in "King's Crystal" and George Napier in "A Rare Bird" (2012).
- Clare Holman played Sue Tutt in "Ring Out Your Dead" (2002), Rose Southerly in "Country Matters" (2006) and Fiona Beauvoisin in "The Miniature Murders" (2019).
- Richard Hope appeared as Gordon Brierly in "Judgement Day" (2000) and as Neville Hayward in "They Seek Him Here" (2007).
- Dominic Jephcott first appeared as Richard Bayly in "Death's Shadow" (1999) and was later cast as Henry Marwood/Benjamin Hastings in "Four Funerals and a Wedding" (2006).
- Rosalind Knight played Eleanor Macpherson in "Birds of Prey" (2003) and Mother Jerome in "A Sacred Trust" (2011).
- Anton Lesser appeared as Eddie Darwin in "Birds of Prey" (2003) and as Rev. Wallace Stone in "Talking to the Dead" (2009).
- Kevin McNally appeared in three episodes: Orville Tudway in "Blood Will Out" (1999), as Gerald Farquaharson in "The Noble Art" (2010) and as Sir Alan Bruce in "Death Strike Three" (2025).
- Frank Mills appeared as Fred Rodale in "Death of a Stranger" (1999), Ted in "Down Among the Dead" (2006) and as Ezra in "Country Matters" (2006).
- Maggie Ollerenshaw appeared as Mrs. Hopkirk in "Country Matters (2006) and as Eileen Fountain in "The Dogleg Murders" (2009).
- Judy Parfitt appeared as Angela Wentworth in "Death's Shadow" (1999) and as Caroline Halsey in "Days of Misrule" (2008).
- Tessa Peake-Jones played Sarah Lawton in "Faithful unto Death" (1998), and Mary Appleton in "Breaking the Chain" (2016).
- Duncan Preston appeared as Colin Cooper in "Dead Man's Eleven" (1999) and as William Fleming in "Claws Out" (2023).
- Siobhan Redmond appeared as Pru Plnkett in "Last Year's Model (2006) and as Ronnie Everett in "The Wolf Hunter of Little Worthy" (2021).
- Miles Richardson appeared as Frederick Bentine-Brown in "Tainted Fruit (2001), Sir Charles in "Country Murders" (2006) and as Dr. Giles Danby in "Fit for Murder" (2011).
- Josette Simon appeared as Samantha Flint in "Last Year's Model" (2006) and as Madeline Saunders in "Claws Out" (2023).
- Elizabeth Spriggs and Richard Cant appeared in the pilot episode "The Killings at Badger's Drift" (1997) as mother and son Iris and Dennis Rainbird; and they appeared again in "Dead Letters" (2006), this time as Iris' sister Ursula Gooding and her son Alistair.
- Maggie Steed played Rosemary Furman in "Judgement Day" (2000), Lynne Fox in "Left for Dead" (2008), and Sylvia Mountford in "Schooled in Murder" (2013).
- Sara Stewart appeared as Carolyn Armitage in "Death in Chorus (2006) and as Miranda Darnley in "The Flying Club" (2014)
- Una Stubbs appeared as Selina Jennings in "Written in Blood" (1998) and as Audrey Braylesford in "The Dagger Club" (2015).
- Rupert Vansittart appeared in three episodes: as Selwyn Proctor in "Market for Murder" (2002), as Desmond Harcourt in "The Axeman Cometh" (2007), and as Alistair Kingslake in "The Dogleg Murders" (2009).
