= Faithful unto Death (novel) =

1996 crime novel by Caroline Graham

- First edition cover
- Author: Caroline Graham
- Language: English
- Series: Chief Inspector Barnaby
- Genre: Crime fiction
- Published: 12 September 1996
- Publisher: Headline
- Publication place: United Kingdom
- Media type: Print (Hardback & paperback)
- Pages: 311
- ISBN: 9780747216650
- Preceded by: Written in Blood
- Followed by: A Place of Safety

Faithful unto Death is a crime novel written by English writer Caroline Graham and first published by Headline in 1996. The story follows Chief Inspector Tom Barnaby investigating the case of a missing woman. It is the fifth volume in Graham's Chief Inspector Barnaby series, preceded by Written in Blood and followed by A Place of Safety. It has been adapted into an episode in the ITV drama Midsomer Murders.

== Plot summary ==
When local housewife Simone Hollingsworth doesn't show up for bell-ringing practice, nobody even raises an eyebrow, let alone suspect anything sinister. However, after her suspicious neighbours, the elderly Brockleys, notice her husband digging holes in his garden late one night, they call in Chief Inspector Barnaby for help unearthing his dark secrets.

== Publication history ==
- United Kingdom: 1996, Headline, London, 1996, Hardback, 311 p., ISBN 0-7472-1665-7.
- United States: 1998, St. Martin's Press, New York City, 1998, Hardback, 311 p., ISBN 0-312-18577-4.

== Reception ==
A starred review from Publishers Weekly stated: "What distinguishes this series from run-of-the-mill English country fare is Graham's dry wit, which is especially smooth when turned on the banality of English middle-class repression." Kirkus Reviews noted: Graham writes in an old-fashioned way—with leisurely grace, ironic wit, real-seeming characters, ongoing suspense, and a corker of a plot. The result: top-flight entertainment." Book critic David Pitt in Booklist, said that the "seemingly typical British small-town mystery ends as an eyebrow-raising shocker."

== Television adaptation ==
The novel was adapted by Douglas Watkinson into the fourth episode of Midsomer Murders, starring (alongside regulars John Nettles, Jane Wymark, Laura Howard and Daniel Casey) Lesley Vickerage as Simone, Michele Dotrice, Peter Jones, Rosalind Ayres, Roger Allam, Tessa Peake-Jones, David Daker and Eleanor Summerfield. Although Graham wrote a further two Chief Inspector Barnaby novels, this was the last to be adapted for television.
