= Betty Willingale =

British television producer (1927–2021)

Betty Kathleen Willingale (27 July 1927 – 15 February 2021) was a British television producer and script editor, best known for her work on BBC Television adaptations of classic literature in the 1970s and 1980s.

== Early life and education ==
Willingale was born in London in 1927, the daughter of a Thames lighterman named James. She acquired her literary interest from her mother, Elizabeth (née Bradish). She gained a scholarship to Aylwin Grammar School in Bermondsey, but was in Scotland on holiday when the Second World War began, remaining north of the border for a year. By her return, the school had been evacuated to Rickmansworth in Hertfordshire.

== Career ==
After leaving school in 1944 without any qualifications, Willingale joined the BBC as a junior assistant in the reference library at Bush House (then the headquarters of the BBC European and Overseas Services). She moved to the television script library, then housed at Lime Grove, in 1955, where Nigel Kneale assisted her in adapting to the medium.

Willingale started to work as a script editor for the BBC beginning with the soap opera Compact in 1962 having rejected an invitation to work in the same role on Z-Cars, moving to the Sunday teatime Classic serial after a year. She became assistant head of the Script Unit. She worked on BBC drama serials with producer Martin Lisemore including North and South (1975) and I, Claudius (1976). After Lisemore's death in a car accident, she formed another strong working partnership with producer Jonathan Powell, script editing many of Powell's most successful drama serials including the adaptations of The Mayor of Casterbridge (1978), Tinker Tailor Soldier Spy (1979), Pride and Prejudice (1980), Sons and Lovers (1980) and The Barchester Chronicles (1982).

She was eventually given the chance to produce an adaptation of Mansfield Park (BBC 1983), later producing adaptations of Tender Is the Night (1985), Bleak House (1985) and Fortunes of War (1987), the latter two earned her BAFTA nominations. Willingale retired from the BBC in 1987.

She then started to work with Brian Eastman of Carnival Films on series made for ITV, Willingale co-produced Poirot, with David Suchet as the detective, and Jeeves and Wooster with Stephen Fry and Hugh Laurie. She optioned the Inspector Barnaby novels by Caroline Graham which became the basis of the long-running ITV series Midsomer Murders and chose John Nettles as the original lead. She produced the pilot episode, the first two series and half of the third and continued working as a Consultant Producer on Midsomer Murders until 2019. In 2015, when a name was needed for the new born baby of the series' lead character, John Barnaby, she was named Betty in Willingale's honour.

== Recognition ==
In 2009 she was awarded Bafta's Special Award for her exceptional career in television.

Betty Willingale died on 15 February 2021 at the age of 93. The opening episode of the 2021 series of Midsomer Murders was dedicated to her memory.
