= Death of a Hollow Man =

Book by Caroline Graham

- First edition cover
- Author: Caroline Graham
- Series: Chief Inspector Barnaby series
- Genre: Mystery, Theatre-fiction
- Publisher: Century
- Publication date: 13 April 1989
- Publication place: England
- Media type: Print (Hardcover & Softcover)
- Pages: 272
- ISBN: 0-7126-2911-4
- Preceded by: The Killings at Badger's Drift
- Followed by: Death in Disguise

Death of a Hollow Man is a detective novel by English writer Caroline Graham published by Century in 1989. The story follows Chief Inspector Tom Barnaby investigating the murder of a stage actor during an ongoing play. It is the second volume in Graham's Chief Inspector Barnaby series, preceded by The Killings at Badger's Drift and followed by Death in Disguise. It has been adapted into an episode of the ITV drama Midsomer Murders.

== Plot summary ==
While attending an amateur production of Amadeus to watch his wife Joyce's performance, Chief Inspector Barnaby witnesses the murder of an actor during the play. The tape covering the razor blade used in the performance has been removed, exposing the sharpened blade and resulting in the actor's death.

As Barnaby investigates, he uncovers personal conflicts and motives among members of the theatre company.

== Publication history ==
- United Kingdom: 1989, Century (imprint of Random House), London, 1989, Hardback, 272 p., ISBN 0-7126-2911-4.
- United States: 1989, Morrow, New York City, 1989, Hardback, 268 p., ISBN 0-688-09116-4.

== Reception ==
Publishers Weekly stated in its review of the novel: "A most enjoyable read, right down to the classic gathering of all the suspects at which Barnaby reveals the killer and the motive." Of Graham's writing, Kirkus Reviews noted: "Graham surely knows her way around the village mystery, touching on all its earmarks: the gossip, the small-mindedness, the noses in everybody's business. And her theatrics ring true. But familiarity, in her case, does not quite equal originality. A middling cozy, then, that needs a few inspired jolts." Elaine Kendall, a book critic of the Los Angeles Times expressed: "As a satire on amateur theater and the idiosyncratic types who invade it, “Death of a Hollow Man” is often amusing, faltering only when author Caroline Graham reaches for the archly dated style of Allingham, Christie, or Marsh. Using Tim and Avery for campy comic relief also seems a tad passe."

== Television adaptation ==
The novel was adapted into the third episode of season one of Midsomer Murders, starring (alongside regulars John Nettles and Daniel Casey) Bernard Hepton, Debra Stephenson, Janine Duvitski, Angela Pleasence, Nicholas Le Prevost, and John Cater.
