= Written in Blood (novel) =

1992 novel by Caroline Graham

- First edition cover
- Author: Caroline Graham
- Language: English
- Series: Chief Inspector Barnaby
- Genre: Crime fiction
- Publisher: Headline
- Publication date: 1 March 1994
- Publication place: United Kingdom
- Media type: Print (Hardcover & paperback)
- Pages: 467
- ISBN: 9780747246640
- OCLC: 32275512
- Preceded by: Death in Disguise
- Followed by: Faithful unto Death

Written in Blood is a crime novel by English author Caroline Graham, first published by Headline in 1994. The story follows Chief Inspector Tom Barnaby as he investigates the murder of a retired civil servant. It is the fourth volume in Graham's Chief Inspector Barnaby series, preceded by Death in Disguise and followed by Faithful unto Death. It has been adapted into an episode in ITV drama Midsomer Murders.

== Plot summary ==
The Midsomer Worthy Writer's Circle, a group of amateur novelists, invite celebrated author Max Jennings as a special guest. Host Gerald Hadleigh vehemently opposes the idea but refuses to explain why, so he is promptly overruled by his peers. After the somewhat uncomfortable event, Hadleigh's companion Rex St. John is tricked into departing, leaving Hadleigh alone with Jennings. The next morning Gerald is found savagely murdered with a candlestick, his corpse stripped and all his clothes stolen, with no sign of Max.

== Reception ==
Publishers Weekly stated in its review of the novel: "The skill with which Graham evokes these characters and explores their individual, often damaged, emotional histories rings of Rendell and P.D. James. The few too many coincidences in the plot will be forgiven for the crisp pace and satisfying twist at the end." Kirkus Reviews noted: "Graham, who deserves a wider US readership, starts out as astringently amusing as Christianna Brand in her classic Green for Danger, and then gradually broadens and deepens to P.D. James territory. What more could you want?" Gail Pool in the Wilson Library Bulletin wrote: "Revolving around the lives and relationships of group members, this is a complicated, satisfying mystery. For all her humor, Graham makes us feel the pathos of these individuals, some struggling to succeed, others enduring lives of 'quiet desperation,' and one of them dead." Emily Melton in Booklist remarked that Graham "effectively juxtaposes the darkly malignant aspects of human behavior with the … trivialities of everyday life."

== Publication history ==
- United Kingdom: 1994, Headline, London, 1994, Hardback, 307 p., ISBN 0-7472-1105-1.
- United States: 1995, W. Morrow, New York City, 1995, Hardback, 387 p., ISBN 0-688-10024-4.

== Television adaptation ==
Written in Blood was adapted on 22 March 1998 as the second episode of Midsomer Murders. The two-hour film starred Anna Massey, Una Stubbs and David Troughton, alongside John Nettles and Daniel Casey in their usual roles of Barnaby and Troy, respectively. The character of Rex St. John is omitted from the episode.
