= Tom Barnaby =

Fictional detective created by Caroline Graham

Thomas Geoffrey "Tom" Barnaby
- Midsomer Murders character
- Portrayed by: John Nettles (TV); Daniel Casey (stage)
- First appearance: The Killings at Badger's Drift (23 March 1997)
- Last appearance: Fit for Murder (2 February 2011)
- Created by: Caroline Graham
In-universe information
- Occupation: Detective Chief Inspector
- Wife: Joyce Barnaby
- Daughters: Cully Dixon (née Barnaby)
- Uncles: Ned Barnaby
- First cousins: John Barnaby

Detective Chief Inspector Thomas Geoffrey "Tom" Barnaby (born 20 April 1943) is a fictional detective created by English writer Caroline Graham as the protagonist in her Chief Inspector Barnaby novel series and adapted into one of the main characters in the ITV drama Midsomer Murders.

Tom Barnaby (played by John Nettles) first appears in the programme's first episode The Killings at Badger's Drift and last appears in Fit for Murder, an episode broadcast on 2 February 2011, which is the final episode of the thirteenth series. He states in an episode called Picture of Innocence that his birthday is 20 April 1943. He is married to Joyce Barnaby, played by Jane Wymark and has a daughter called Cully, played by Laura Howard. He appeared in 81 episodes before handing over to his cousin John Barnaby (Neil Dudgeon). He is assisted in every episode by a sergeant. He has three sergeants throughout his tenure, Gavin Troy, 1997–2003, Daniel Scott, 2003–2005 and Benjamin Jones, 2005–2011.

Daniel Casey, who had co-starred in the series as DS Troy, was cast as Barnaby in a stage adaptation of the first book The Killings at Badger's Drift.

== Chief Inspector Barnaby book series ==
- The Killings at Badger's Drift (1987)
- Death of a Hollow Man (1989)
- Death in Disguise (1992)
- Written in Blood (1994)
- Faithful unto Death (1996)
- A Place of Safety (1999)
- A Ghost in the Machine (2004)
