= Jessica Ellerby =

British actress

- Born: Jessica Anne Ellerby; 1986 (age 39–40); Dubai, United Arab Emirates
- Education: Bristol Old Vic Theatre School
- Years active: 2008–present
- Spouse: Nick Hendrix (m. 2017)

Jessica Anne Ellerby (born 1986) is an Emirati-born English actress and filmmaker. She began her career in theatre. On television, she is known for her roles in the Netflix sitcom Lovesick (2014–2016), series 8 of Benidorm (2016) on ITV, and the Epix series Pennyworth (2019–2021).

== Early life ==
Ellerby was born and raised in Dubai to English parents. She attended Dubai College. At 17, Ellerby moved to England for her A Levels. She went on to graduate from Bristol Old Vic Theatre School.

== Career ==
After graduating from drama school, Ellerby made her professional stage debut in Triptych at Southwark Playhouse in 2008. In 2010, she made her West End debut in Dreamboats and Petticoats at the Playhouse Theatre.

After making her feature film debut with a background role in the 2010 comedy Get Him to the Greek, Ellerby had her first starring role as Lynne in the 2011 indie horror film Hollow. In 2012, Ellerby returned to the West End in Trevor Nunn's production of A Chorus of Disapproval at the Harold Pinter Theatre. She then appeared in the 2013 film Svengali as Alice.

From 2014 to 2016, Ellerby had a recurring role in the first two series of the Netflix sitcom Lovesick as Jane Ansell, Dylan's (Johnny Flynn) love interest. In 2015, Ellerby appeared in the music video for Noel Gallagher's song "Ballad of the Mighty I". In 2016, Ellerby joined the main cast of the long-running ITV sitcom Benidorm for its eighth series as Amber Platt.

Ellerby wrote and directed the 2018 short film The Hungry Games.

Ellerby played Stacee in the second series of the Sky One comedy-drama Living the Dream, which aired in 2019. Also in 2019, Ellerby portrayed a young Queen Elizabeth II in the DC Universe series Pennyworth on Epix. She reprised her recurring role as the Queen in Pennyworth's second season.

== Personal life ==
Ellerby lives in London. She married actor Nick Hendrix in July 2017. In addition to acting, Ellerby runs a yoga studio.

== Filmography ==
=== Film ===
| Year | Title | Role | Notes |
|---|---|---|---|
| 2010 | Get Him to the Greek | Club Girl | |
| 2011 | Hollow | Lynne | |
| 2013 | Svengali | Alice | |
| 2015 | The Pitch | Carol | Short film |
| 2016 | The Five Wives & Lives of Melvyn Pfferberg | Scarlett | Short film |
| 2018 | The Hungry Games | Anna | Short film; directed |
| 2019 | This Time Away | Louise | Short film |
| 2019 | Dirty Rotten Liars | Sasha | Short film |
| 2023 | Making Up | Cass | Short film |

=== Television ===
| Year | Title | Role | Notes |
|---|---|---|---|
| 2009 | The Bill | Stacey Hayes | Episode: "Growing Pains" |
| 2013 | By Any Means | Karen Mason | 1 episode |
| 2014 | Endeavour | Diana Day | Episode: "Trove" |
| 2014 | Cardinal Burns | Various | 1 episode |
| 2014–2016 | Lovesick | Jane Ansell | 4 episodes |
| 2015 | Inside No. 9 | Zara | Anthology, episode: "The 12 Days of Christine" |
| 2015 | SunTrap | Waitress | Episode: "The Usual Suspects" |
| 2015 | The Red Dress | Candice | Television film |
| 2016 | Benidorm | Amber Platt | Main role (series 8, 7 episodes) |
| 2016 | In the Club | Molly | 3 episodes |
| 2016 | Hoff the Record | Rebecca | Episode: "Finance" |
| 2019 | Living the Dream | Stacee | 5 episodes |
| 2019–2021 | Pennyworth | Queen Elizabeth II | 13 episodes |
| 2021 | Midsomer Murders | Caitlin Dawson | Episode: "Scarecrow Murders" |

=== Video games ===
| 2023 | The Lord of the Rings: Gollum | Mell |

== Stage ==
| Year | Title | Role | Notes |
|---|---|---|---|
| 2008 | Triptych | Brandy | Southwark Playhouse, London |
| 2008 | Word:Play 2 | | Theatre503, London |
| 2009 | Oorah! | | Finborough Theatre, London |
| 2009 | Dick Whittington | Alice Fitzwarren | The Theatre Chipping Norton |
| 2010 | Dreamboats and Petticoats | Donna | Playhouse Theatre, London |
| 2011 | Fanta Orange | Ronnie | Finborough Theatre, London |
| 2012 | A Chorus of Disapproval | Linda Washbrook | Harold Pinter Theatre, London |
