= Death in Disguise =

Book by Caroline Graham

- First edition cover
- Author: Caroline Graham
- Language: English
- Series: Chief Inspector Barnaby
- Genre: Crime fiction
- Published: 9 July 1992
- Publisher: Headline
- Publication place: United Kingdom
- Media type: Book
- Pages: 434
- ISBN: 9780755342174
- Preceded by: Death of a Hollow Man
- Followed by: Written in Blood

Death in Disguise is a crime novel written by English writer Caroline Graham and first published by Headline in 1992. The story follows Chief Inspector Tom Barnaby investigating the murder of a cult member. It is the third volume in Graham's Chief Inspector Barnaby series, preceded by Death of a Hollow Man and followed by Written in Blood. It has been adapted into an episode in the ITV drama Midsomer Murders.

== Plot summary ==
In a country manor house currently owned by a New Age cult of mystics, the mysterious death of member William Carter stirs all the local gossips into a frenzy of speculation. However, the rumours of sinister events are confirmed when the so-called Master of the Lodge is killed with a carving knife during a psychic regression.

Meanwhile, untrustworthy financier Guy Gamelin tries reconciling with his estranged, cultist daughter Sylvia, now called Suhami, as does her alcoholic mother. Chief Inspector Barnaby finds himself lost amidst a labyrinthine puzzle of deception, evil and pseudo-supernatural forces.

== Publication history ==
- United Kingdom: 1992, Headline, London, 1992, Hardback, 374 p., ISBN 0-7472-0608-2.
- United States: 1993, Morrow, New York City, 1993, Hardback, 333 p., ISBN 0-688-09985-8.

== Reception ==
Publishers Weekly stated in its review of the novel: "Graham's competent procedural works most effectively as a wickedly acid yet sympathetic portrayal of a group of society's misfits seeking comfort and a place in the world." Kirkus Reviews noted: "Wonderfully funny, with such solid, traditional underpinnings as good plotting, judiciously dropped clues, and a luminescent turn of phrase: a likely-to-be New Age classic."

== Television adaptation ==
The novel was adapted by Douglas Watkinson into the fifth episode of Midsomer Murders starring (alongside regulars John Nettles and Daniel Casey) Judy Cornwell, Miles Anderson, Charles Kay, Stephen Moyer and Geoffrey Beevers.
