= Death in Disguise (disambiguation) =

Death in Disguise is a 1992 crime novel by Caroline Graham. It may also refer to:

- Death in Disguise, a temperance poem, an 1833 publication by poet McDonald Clarke
- The third chapter of Federal Agents vs. Underworld, Inc, a 1949 American serial
- "Death in Disguise", a 1978 episode of the American television series Wonder Woman
- "Death in Disguise", a series 1 (1998) episode of the British television detective drama Midsomer Murders
