= The Killings at Badger's Drift =

Book by Caroline Graham

- First edition cover
- Author: Caroline Graham
- Series: Chief Inspector Barnaby series
- Genre: Mystery
- Publisher: Century
- Publication date: 5 November 1987
- Publication place: England
- Media type: Print (Hardcover & Softcover)
- Pages: 264
- ISBN: 978-0-917561-41-2
- OCLC: 15521305
- Followed by: Death of a Hollow Man

The Killings at Badger's Drift is a mystery novel by English writer Caroline Graham and published by Century in 1987. The story follows Chief Inspector Tom Barnaby investigating the murder of an elderly spinster in a rural village. It is the first volume in Graham's Chief Inspector Barnaby series, followed by Death of a Hollow Man. In 1997, it was adapted as the pilot of Midsomer Murders, a popular ITV television series based on Graham's books.

== Plot summary ==
In the fictional village of Badger's Drift, the elderly Miss Bellringer insists that her friend, Emily Simpson, did not die of a heart attack as her doctor claims, but was in fact murdered. An autopsy soon proves her right, as a mix of red wine and hemlock is found in the dead woman's system. While the village descends into panic, the murderer strikes again, claiming the life of local birdwatcher Iris Rainbird. As Barnaby investigates, aided by Sergeant Gavin Troy, he uncovers a connection between an older crime and the current killings at Badger's Drift.

== Publication ==
- United Kingdom: 1987, Century (imprint of Random House), London, 1987, Hardback, 264 p., ISBN 0-7126-1744-2.
- United States: 1988, Adler & Adler, Bethesda, Maryland, 1988, Hardback, 264 p., ISBN 0-917561-41-4.
- Reprint: 2005, Felony & Mayhem Press, United States, 2005, trade paperback, xiv, 272 p., ISBN 978-1-933397-04-7

== Reception ==
Publishers Weekly stated in its review of the novel: "Graham makes the characters humanly believable in her witty and tragic novel, a real winner." Kirkus Reviews noted: "An OK debut, but it might have been spectacular if Graham had focused more on the horticulture or more on the rococo sexual whimsies." In 2019, The Guardian included the novel in its Top 10 golden age detective novels list.

== Awards ==
The Killings at Badger's Drift was well received by the mystery community. It was listed in The Top 100 Crime Novels of All Time, a list published in book form in 1990 by the British-based Crime Writers' Association. It also won the 1989 Macavity Award for "Best First Novel" and was nominated for the same honour at the 1989 Anthony Awards and the 1988 Agatha Awards.

== Television adaptation ==
The book was adapted for British television as the first episode of Midsomer Murders, starring John Nettles as DCI Tom Barnaby and Daniel Casey as DS Gavin Troy. Broadcast on 23 March 1997, it was an enormous ratings success when there were only four television channels in the UK. The episode made its debut in the United States on the A&E cable network, with two showings on the night of 28 June 1998. On the screen, Emily Simpson's murder is made more violent. Instead of being poisoned, as in the novel, she is bludgeoned to death.

== Stage adaptation ==
A stage adaptation of the story is touring the United Kingdom in 2025 and 2026. Inspector Tom Barnaby is played by Daniel Casey, who previously appeared as Troy in the main show.
