= Hollow (2011 film) =

- Promotional poster
- Directed by: Michael Axelgaard
- Written by: Matthew Holt
- Starring: Emily Plumtree; Sam Stockman; Matt Stokoe; Jessica Ellerby; Simon Roberts
- Production company: Hollow Pictures
- Distributed by: Metrodome Distribution
- Release dates: 31 July 2011 (Fantasia Festival); 25 January 2013 (United Kingdom); 19 February 2013 (United States)
- Running time: 89 minutes
- Country: United Kingdom
- Language: English

Hollow is a 2011 British found footage horror film, directed by Michael Axelgaard, starring Emily Plumtree, Sam Stockman, Jessica Ellerby, and Matt Stokoe. The film was distributed by Tribeca Film via nationwide On Demand outlets. Hollow premiered at Fantasia Festival. The film also screened at the Raindance Film Festival and was nominated for British Independent Film Award.

== Plot ==
The film tells the story of an "old monastery in a small, remote village in Suffolk, England that has been haunted by a local legend for centuries. Left in ruin and shrouded by the mystery of a dark spirit that wills young couples to suicide, the place has been avoided for years, marked only by a twisted, ancient tree with an ominous hollow said to be the home of great evil. When four friends on holiday explore the local folklore, they realise that belief in a myth can quickly materialise into reality, bringing horror to life for the town."

== Cast ==
- Emily Plumtree as Emma
- Sam Stockman as James
- Jessica Ellerby as Lynne
- Matt Stokoe as Scott

== Reception ==
On Rotten Tomatoes, the film holds an approval rating of 20% based on 15 reviews, with a weighted average rating of 3.96/10.

Nigel Floyd from Time Out London gave the film 1/5 stars, writing "Director Michael Axelgaard and scriptwriter Matthew Holt spend time establishing the characters’ emotional histories and current vulnerabilities, balancing the external, supernatural threat with the fraught dynamics of the group. But they completely fail to stretch this credibility-defying, stop-start plot into a full-length ‘found footage’ feature." Kim Newman from Empire Awarded it 2/5 stars, calling it "A so-so spookfest that offers few surprises". Matt Glasby from Total Film also gave it 2/5 stars, stating that "proceedings switch from quietly creepy to loudly exasperating as relationship woes replace scares". Thomas Spurlin from DVD Talk gave the film a negative review, writing, Hollow becomes a tepid stretch of jostled camera footage and yelling, chronicling the tedious psychosis that ensues when these characters finally start caring about the ancient curse when their lives are threatened."
