= Justine (2020 film) =

- Directed by: Jamie Patterson
- Written by: Jeff Murphy
- Produced by: Julius Beltrame; Sarah Drew; Jamie Patterson
- Starring: Tallulah Haddon; Sophie Reid
- Cinematography: Paul O'Callaghan
- Edited by: David Fricker
- Music by: Richey Rynkowski
- Production companies: Jump Start Productions; Rush Productions
- Distributed by: Lesflicks
- Release dates: 28 October 2020 (MIX Copenhagen); 5 March 2021 (internet)
- Running time: 82 minutes
- Country: United Kingdom
- Language: English

Justine is a 2020 British romantic drama film directed by Jamie Patterson, starring Tallulah Haddon and Sophie Reid.

== Cast ==
- Tallulah Haddon as Justine
- Sophie Reid as Rachel
- Xavien Russell as Peach
- Sian Reese-Williams as Leanne
- Steve Oram as Dr. Jim
- Kirsty Dillon as Olivia

== Release ==
The film was released to digital platforms on 5 March 2021.

== Reception ==
Emily Maskell of Little White Lies wrote that while the film's dialogue occasionally "borders on cliché", the film's "diligence in rejecting queer abandonment allows for a sincere portrayal of lesbian love where obstacles are presented in isolation from sexuality, an exemption that feels particularly poignant."

Phuong Le of The Guardian rated the film 3 stars out of 5 and wrote that while the film has several "heavy-handed moments", it is still a "poignant study of a young woman struggling to stay afloat."
