= Olwen Wymark =

American dramatist

- Born: Olwen Margaret Buck; 14 February 1932; Oakland, California, U.S.
- Died: 14 June 2013 (aged 81); London, England
- Occupation: Writer
- Spouse: Patrick Wymark (m. 1953; died 1970)
- Children: 4, including Jane Wymark
- Writing career
- Period: 1966–1992

Olwen Margaret Wymark (née Buck; 14 February 1932 – 14 June 2013) was an American writer and playwright.

== Biography ==
Olwen Margaret Buck was born on 14 February 1932 in Oakland, California, the daughter of Philip W. (a professor of political science) and Barbara (Jacobs) Buck, and the granddaughter of English author W. W. Jacobs. She attended Pomona College from 1949–51 and University College, London from 1951–52.

Her most successful play was Find Me (1977), about mental illness, which is still used as a set text for drama qualifications in UK schools. Others included Gymnasium (1972), Loved (1980), Best Friends (1984), Strike Up The Banns (1990), and Mirror Mirror (1992). She also wrote dozens of BBC radio play adaptations, including her 2001 version of Thomas Mann's The Magic Mountain; one of her last works, it starred Paul Scofield in one of his greatest radio roles.

== Personal life ==
She was married to British actor Patrick Wymark, whom she met at University College, London, from 1953 until his death in 1970. Patrick, whose birth surname was Cheeseman, took his acting name from the middle name of Olwen's paternal grandfather, novelist and short story writer W. W. Jacobs. They had four children: Jane (an actress), Rowan, Dominic, and Tristram. Wymark resided for most of her life in London.

== Bibliography ==
Plays

- Lunchtime Concert (one-act), first produced in Glasgow, Scotland, at Citizens Theatre, (1966)
- Triple Image (three one-act plays) (1967)
  - Coda
  - Lunchtime Concert
  - The Inhabitants (1967)
- The Gymnasium (one-act) (1967)
- "The Technicians" (one-act) (1969)
- Stay Where You Are (one-act) (1969)
- Neither Here Nor There (one-act) (1971)
- Speak Now (two-act) (1971)
- The Committee (one-act) (1971)
- Jack the Giant Killer (one-act) (1972)
- Tales From Whitechapel (one-act) (1972)
- Watch the Woman (two-act), (1973) with Brian Phelan
- The Twenty-Second Day (one-act) (1975)
- We Three (one-act) (1977)
- After Nature, Art (one-act) (1977)
- Find Me (two-act) (1977)
- Loved (two-act) (1979)
- Please Shim Down on Me (1980)
- Best Friends (1981)
- One Woman Plays (adapted from three plays by Dario Fo and Franca Rame) (1981)
- Lessons and Lovers: D.H. Lawrence in New Mexico: a Play (1986)

== Quotes ==
In an interview with Contemporary Authors: "From the fifties until my husband died in 1970 I wrote plays because I wanted to; now I write them for a living. Although I have never written 'a commercial' play, I have to sell my work. Consequently I think my plays have become less obscure (and pretentious), and I find myself more drawn to comedy. The theatre is my first passion, but I love to write for radio and would like to write more for TV and would really like to write a film."
