= A Ghost in the Machine =

Book by Caroline Graham

- First edition (UK)
- Author: Caroline Graham
- Series: Chief Inspector Barnaby
- Genre: Detective fiction
- Publisher: Headline
- Publication date: 1 August 2004
- Publication place: United Kingdom
- Pages: 512
- ISBN: 0755307720
- Preceded by: A Place of Safety

A Ghost in the Machine is a crime novel written by English writer Caroline Graham. It was first published in 2004 by Headline in the United Kingdom, and St. Martin's Minotaur in the United States. The story follows Chief Inspector Tom Barnaby investigating the case of the death of an antique collector. It is the seventh and final volume in Graham's Chief Inspector Barnaby series and preceded by A Place of Safety.

Unlike the majority of Graham's previous Chief Inspector Barnaby novels, A Ghost in the Machine was not adapted for the television series Midsomer Murders. According to Graham, this was because Chief Inspector Barnaby and Sergeant Troy are absent through the first half of the novel.

== Plot summary ==
Village resident Dennis Brinkley, an enthusiastic collector of old war machines and torture weapons, suffers a gruesome death after being crushed by one of his own devices. Although his demise is initially regarded as an accident, his best friend Benny believes otherwise, and her suspicions are only confirmed by local psychic Ava Garrett, who tells her that she will ask Dennis to identify his killer at her next seance.

However, the elusive murderer silences her before the event can go ahead, leaving Chief Inspector Barnaby, accompanied by his Sergeant Gavin Troy, with two gruesome slayings and a complex mystery to unravel. Several of Dennis's friends and associates come under suspicion, and much of the book is devoted to detailing their tangled lives.

== Reception ==
Publishers Weekly stated in its review of the novel: "With its focus on a dozen or so richly diverting characters, British author Graham's well-plotted ninth novel featuring Chief Inspector Tom Barnaby has more in common with Dickens than with Conan Doyle."
