= Kirsty Dillon =

British actress

- Born: 1976 (age 49–50); Portsmouth, Hampshire, England, UK
- Education: Goldsmiths, University of London
- Occupation: Actress
- Years active: 1995-present
- Known for: Midsomer Murders

Kirsty Dillon (born 1976) is an English actress who works in film, television, and theatre. She is best known for her role as WPC Gail Stephens in the British television drama Midsomer Murders.

== Early life and education ==
Dillon was born and brought up in Portsmouth, Hampshire. She was educated at Portsmouth High School and Havant College, graduated from Goldsmiths', University of London, studying Drama and Theatre Arts, and then attended Webber Douglas Academy of Dramatic Art.

== Career ==
Her roles include in the BBC drama The Man That Broke Britain, Rosalind in As You Like It, as well as numerous TV credits including for Holby City, Casualty, The Bill, Doctors, and the Channel 4 film Rockabye. She has been recognized for her regular role as DC Gail Stephens in the drama Midsomer Murders.

In 2016, Dillon played the role of Luke's mother, Helen, in the film To Dream, and played Olivia in the 2020 drama Justine.

== Personal life ==
Dillon is an ambassador of the White Ribbon Campaign, the international campaign to ‘End Male Violence Against Women’. She works closely with survivors of domestic violence through organisations such as Early Intervention Project and Women's Aid and campaigns to raise awareness which includes handing in a petition at 10 Downing Street and gaining support from John Nettles and David James to raise awareness amongst men. She also is an ambassador for the Aurora New Dawn charity.

== Filmography ==
- Clock Tower 3 - Alyssa Hamilton
- Locke (2014)
- To Dream (2016) - Helen
- Justine (2020)
