= John Hopkins (actor) =

English actor (born 1975)

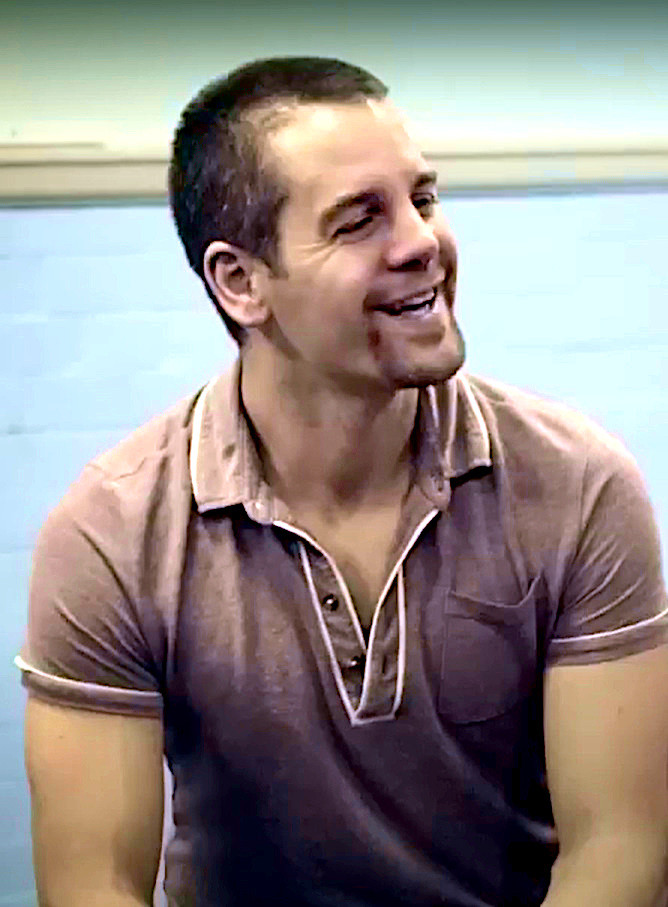
- Hopkins in 2013
- Born: 1975 (age 50–51); Luton, Bedfordshire, England
- Education: University of Leeds; Royal Academy of Dramatic Art
- Occupation: Actor
- Known for: Midsomer Murders, Alice in Wonderland
- Notable work: Poldark, Midsomer Murders
- Awards: Behind the Voice Actors Awards, Ian Charleson Award

John Hopkins (born 1975) is an English-American actor. Some of his best-known roles include Sgt. Dan Scott on Midsomer Murders (2004–2005), Lowell in Tim Burton's Alice in Wonderland (2010), and Sir Francis Basset in the British TV series Poldark (2017–2018). In addition to his television and film work, Hopkins also acts on stage and does voiceovers for video games, film, television and radio.

== Early life and education ==
Hopkins was born in Luton, Bedfordshire. There is little publicly available information about his family or childhood. He attended secondary school at Manshead CofE Upper School in Dunstable, Bedfordshire, and later studied at the University of Leeds (1993–1996), majoring in English. Hopkins received a Sunday Times Short Story Award for student-actors for his role in A Short Play About Sex and Death. After graduation from the University of Leeds, he attended the Royal Academy of Dramatic Art (1997–2000). He was noticed by the Royal Shakespeare Company and had his first repertory season there (2001–2002).

== Career ==
In 2002, Hopkins began receiving offers for television roles. Some of the first were minor parts in Trial and Retribution 7 and Love in a Cold Climate. His breakthrough role came when he was offered the role of Detective Sergeant Dan Scott in the hit British television series Midsomer Murders. His involvement with the show continued from the beginning of the 7th series (2004) to the end of the 8th series. Hopkins' character was conceived as a "ladies' man" because of his appearance. During this time, John Nettles was playing the lead role of "Barnaby". Because the actors shared the same first name, Hopkins was assigned the nickname "Hoppers". The two formed a friendship while working together from 2004 to 2005 when Hopkins left the show, returning to the Royal Shakespeare Company to participate in the 2006-2007 London and Stratford-upon-Avon season. At that time, he played Caesar opposite Patrick Stewart in Antony and Cleopatra. He also appeared in Patrick Barlow's comedic version of The 39 Steps as Richard Hannay, as Richard I at the Shakespeare's Globe in the Holy Warriors, and as Benedick in Much Ado About Nothing. He has also continued to work in television; his credits there include Stan Lee's Lucky Man and the BBC drama Poldark as Sir Francis Basset. Billington in 2018 for The Guardian referred to Hopkins as "one of our best Shakespearean actors", and he was named one of "10 best British actors on stage now" in The Times article by Dominic Maxwell.

=== Interview for the Midsomer Murders Society ===
Hopkins thinks that the whole concept of the Midsomer Murders series is based on the idea of presenting serenity in an issued society. He considers that show is crucial for almost everyone because it demonstrates how all the problems can be solved, where good wins over evil, and everyone returns to the ordinary life once all is done. Hopkins joined the television show when it already had vast popularity. Therefore, as he states, "a bit more pressure was on me than the other guys". Hopkins describes his character as a person who is unwelcoming towards the countryside. He prefers city life and always looks for the method to escape but never achieves it. The relationship between Sergeant Dan Scott (Hopkins' role) and Detective Chief Inspector (DCI) Barnaby (John Nettles' role) was tense at the beginning, but eventually became smoother, despite Barnaby's disapproval of Scott's ways. The character Scott and the actor Hopkins have quite different attitudes towards country life; Hopkins feels delighted about spending time in the country. Midsomer Murders allowed him to get to know other great British performers, including the actor Diana Quick and the rower Sir Steve Redgrave. While filming the show, Hopkins got a chance to participate in a movie made by his friends in Prague. His character was a man who woke up in Prague with amnesia. He said he enjoyed playing an "action hero".

=== Interview on Christmas and The Festive Episode ===
Hopkins stated that he enjoys getting away on Christmas holidays to the Lake District, Peak District or Wales. He and his friends climb mountains between Boxing Day and New Year's Eve. Those days remind him of childhood. Before the trip, Hopkins visits his family. Together they eat and watch Midsomer Murders, and recount stories from the past. However, one Christmas he had to spend shooting for the TV show. The shooting was in an old abandoned house which was reputed to be haunted. Hopkins recalled wondering what story was behind the house and the atmosphere it created by sudden sounds and changes in temperature. Hopkins mentioned in the interview that he gained some weight during the winter episodes, due to wearing layers of clothing to keep warm.

== Filmography ==
=== Film ===
Year	Title	Role	Notes
2001	The Life and Adventures of Nicholas Nickleby	Lord	TV movie (Uncredited)
2001	The Pool	Frank	
2005	Experiment	Morgan	
2010	Dora and Diego’s 4-D Adventure Catch That Robot Butterfly	Extra	Short film
2010	Alice in Wonderland	Lowell	
2011	Scenes of an Adult Nature	Tom	Short film
2011	Love Me or Else	Detective Franks	Short film
2012	Hacks	Connor Feast	TV movie
2014	The Face of an Angel	Joe	
2015	Baklava	Game Short Host	Short film
2017	The Child in Time	Home Secretary	TV movie
2019	Four	N/A	Short film, writer
2021	Absent Now the Dead	Odysseus	Voice
2021	The Mezzotint	Binks	TV movie
2021	Hilda and the Mountain King	Erik Ahlberg	TV movie
2021	Night and Day	Laurence	Short film
2026	Toy Story 5	Mr. Pricklepants	Voice, replaces Timothy Dalton and Robin Atkin Downes

=== Television ===
Year	Title	Role	Notes
2001	Love in a Cold Climate	Robert Parker	1 episode
2003	Spooks	Anton	1 episode
2003	Trial & Retribution	Ian Frogton QC	1 episode
2004–2005	Midsomer Murders	Sergeant Dan Scott	Main role (season 7–8)
2005	Family Affairs	Rex Randall	15 episodes
2005	All-Star Poker Challenge	Self	2 episodes
2006	The Path to 9/11	British Reporter	2 episodes
2006	Tripping Over	Nathaniel	1 episode
2007	Robin Hood	John of York	1 episode
2008	Mutual Friends	Sam Westwood Jones	1 episode
2008	Wire in the Blood	DI Andy Hall	2 episodes
2009	The Bill	Daniel Pfeiffer	2 episodes
2009	Hotel Babylon	Phil McGuiness	1 episode
2010	Identity	Justin Curtis	1 episode
2010	Merlin	Sir Oswald	1 episode
2011	Dick and Dom's Funny Business	Various	1 episode
2011	Secret Diary of a Call Girl	Tom	1 episode
2011	Casualty	Tom Russel	1 episode
2013	Dancing on the Edge	Prince George	3 episodes
2015	Catastrophe	Sandy Laybourne	1 episode
2015	Doctors	Matt Flowers	1 episode
2016	Lucky Man	Charles Collins	3 episodes
2016	The Lodge	Samuel "SJ" James	1 episode
2016	Endeavour	Dr. Dean Powell	1 episode
2017–2018	Poldark	Sir Francis Basset	8 episodes
2018	Watergate	H.R. Bob Haldeman	Documentary-series
2019	Jesus: His Life	Peter	Main role
2020	Agatha Raisin	Tom 'Bunchie' Richards	1 episode
2020	Hilda	Erik Ahlberg (voice)	Main role (season 2)
2022	Trying	Lawrence	Episode: "Pick a Side"
2023	Funny Woman	Andrew O'Shea	Recurring role (season 1)
2023	Masters of the Air	Dr. Wendell 'Smokey' Stover	Recurring role
2024	A Very Royal Scandal	Jeffrey Epstein	Recurring role
2024	Paris Has Fallen	Richard	Recurring role
2025	Father Brown	Sherman Quinn	Season 12, Episode 8

=== Theatre ===
Theatre Performances of John Hopkins
Year	Title	Role	Company / Director
2001	King John	Dauphin	Royal Shakespeare Company / Gregory Doran
2001	Julius Caesar	Octavius	Royal Shakespeare Company / Edward Hall, (Ian Charleston nomination)
2001	Antony and Cleopatra	Dolabella	Royal Shakespeare Company / Michael Attenborough
2001	Much Ado About Nothing	Claudio / Benedick	Royal Shakespeare Company / Gregory Doran
2001	Play	Man	Natalie Abrahami
2001	Screams from Job	Eli	Tassos Stevens
2001	Venus and Adonis	Narrator	Royal Shakespeare Company / Gregory Doran
2006	The Tempest	Sebastian	Royal Shakespeare Company / Rupert Goold
2006	Holy Warriors	Richard I	Royal Shakespeare Company
2006	Antony and Cleopatra	Caesar	Royal Shakespeare Company / Gregory Doran
2007–2008	The Country Wife	Harcourt	West End / Jonathan Kent
2007–2008	Hamlet	Claudius / Various	Tim Carroll
2009–2010	39 Steps	Richard Hannay	West End / Maria Aitken
2019–2020	A Christmas Carol	Ebenezer Scrooge	Bristol Old Vic / Tom Morris
2023	Bleak Expectations	Gently Benevolent	West End / Caroline Leslie
2024	My Fair Lady	Henry Higgins	Leeds Playhouse & Opera North / James Brining
2024–2025	Dr. Strangelove	General Ripper	Noël Coward Theatre / Armando Iannucci

=== Video games ===
Year	Title	Role	Notes
2013	Ryse: Son of Rome	Marius	
2015	Sword Coast Legends	Javen Tamikos	
2015	Assassin's Creed Syndicate	Maxwell Roth	
2016	Tom Clancy's The Division	Aaron Keener	
2016	Hitman	Lucas Grey / The Shadow Client	
2016	Battlefleet Gothic: Armada	Captain Tiberius Solarian / Malefica Arkham	
2017	Horizon Zero Dawn	Erend	
2017	Warhammer 40,000: Dawn of War III	Space Marines	
2017	Dragon Quest XI: Echoes of an Elusive Age	Hendrik	
2018	Hitman 2	Lucas Grey	
2019	Anthem	The Bard	
2019	Tom Clancy's The Division 2	Aaron Keener	
2020	Total War: Warhammer II	Eltharion The Grim	(DLC)
2021	Hitman 3	Lucas Grey	
2021	Last Stop	Dan Hughes / 80s Policeman 2	
2021	Scarf	voice	
2022	Horizon Forbidden West	Erend	
2023	Final Fantasy XVI	Elwin Rosfield	
2023	Baldur's Gate 3	Arnell Hallowleaf	
2023	Warhammer Age of Sigmar: Realms of Ruin	Iden, Knights Excelsior	
2024	Skull & Bones	John Scurlock	
2024	Rise of the Ronin	Commodore Matthew Perry	
2024	Stellar Blade	Clyde	
2024	Horizon Zero Dawn Remastered	Erend	
2024	Lego Horizon Adventures	Erend	
2026	Nioh 3	Hattori Hanzo	English VO
2026	Resonance: A Plague Tale Legacy	Minos	

=== Audio ===
Year	Title	Type	Role	Notes
2022–present	Short History of... (Series 3-)	Podcast	Presenter / Narrator	starting with: The Great Fire of London Noiser Podcasts
2022–2023	Scotland Yard Confidential	Podcast	Presenter / Narrator	starting with: The London Cellar Murder Noiser Podcasts
2023–present	Real Survival Stories	Podcast	Presenter / Narrator	starting with: Paragliding Disaster: Sucked Towards the Stratosphere Noiser Podcasts

== Awards ==
Hopkins has been nominated for several awards during his career. He received two nominations for his voice in the video game Horizon Zero Dawn (2017) for the voiceover of "Erend".

Awards
Year	Award name	Category	Status
2001	Ian Charleson Award		Additional award
2018	Behind the Voice Actors Awards (BTVA) Video Game Voice Acting Award	Best Male Vocal Performance in a Video Game in a Supporting Role	Nominated
2018	Behind the Voice Actors Awards (BTVA) Video Game Voice Acting Award	Best Vocal Ensemble in a Video Game	Nominated
2023	The British Short Film Awards	Best Actor, Smile School	Nominated
2024	UK Theatre Awards	Best Performance in a Musical, My Fair Lady	Nominated
