= A Place of Safety =

Book by Caroline Graham

- First edition cover
- Author: Caroline Graham
- Language: English
- Series: Chief Inspector Barnaby
- Genre: crime novel
- Published: 11 March 1999 Headline (UK); Sept 1999 Minotaur (US)
- Publication place: United Kingdom
- Pages: 377
- ISBN: 9780312244194
- OCLC: 42196867
- Preceded by: Faithful unto Death
- Followed by: A Ghost in the Machine

A Place of Safety is a crime novel written by English writer Caroline Graham and first published by Headline in 1999. The story follows Chief Inspector Tom Barnaby investigating the murder of a man in a village. It is the sixth volume in Graham's Chief Inspector Barnaby series, preceded by Faithful unto Death and followed by A Ghost in the Machine.

Unlike Graham's previous Chief Inspector Barnaby novels, A Place of Safety was not adapted for the television series Midsomer Murders. According to Graham, this was because the novel did not fit into the "Whodunit" format of the series.

== Plot summary ==
Ferne Basset vicar's wife Ann Lawrence accuses Carlotta, a young homeless girl her husband has taken in, of stealing her precious heirloom earrings. Their argument escalates and the pair end up fighting on the area's picturesque bridge, when Carlotta falls off into the river below.

After her body doesn't re-surface, witness Charlie Leathers begins blackmailing Ann for money, until he's found garrotted and his pet dog, Candy, left savagely beaten. However, still another blackmail demand arrives and this time Ann won't pay. Meanwhile, Chief Inspector Barnaby peels away at the wholesome veneer of Ferne Basset in his hunt for a dangerous and sadistic killer.

== Reception ==
A starred review from Publishers Weekly stated: "Graham's eighth novel...masterfully recounts the effects of love--or its absence--on a diverse group of people, including her series detective, Inspector Tom Barnaby...Graham is a master of pacing, and her dialogue is dark and worldly-wise enough to make this much fuller fare than most English-village cozies." Kirkus Reviews noted: "The author’s sharp characters and complex but believable plotting are in full play here, to the reader’s delight. " David Pitt in Booklist remarked that the novel is gentle but intensely pleasurable reading.
