= Nick Hendrix =

English actor (born 1985)

- Born: 19 March 1985 (age 41); Ascot, Berkshire, England
- Education: University of Exeter; Royal Academy of Dramatic Art
- Occupation: Actor
- Years active: 2011–present
- Known for: Playing Detective Sergeant Jamie Winter in Midsomer Murders
- Spouse: Jessica Ellerby (m. 2017)

Nick Hendrix (born 19 March 1985) is an English actor, best known for his role as Detective Sergeant Jamie Winter in the ITV police detective show Midsomer Murders.

== Early life and education ==
Hendrix was born in Ascot, Berkshire. He grew up in Eton, near Windsor. Hendrix is the nephew of former ITV & GB News newscaster Alastair Stewart.

Hendrix earned a BA in drama at the University of Exeter. He graduated from the Royal Academy of Dramatic Art (RADA) with a BA in acting in 2010.

== Personal life ==
Hendrix has been married to actress Jessica Ellerby since July 2017.

== Stage and theatre ==
Year	Title	Role	Theatre	Notes
2011	Eden End	Wilfred Kirby	English Touring Theatre (various venues)	Professional theatre debut
2011	Journey's End	Stanhope		No. 1 Tour
2012	What The Butler Saw	Nicholas Beckett	Vaudeville Theatre	West End debut
2013	The Winslow Boy	Dickie Winslow	The Old Vic	
2013	The Light Princess	Prince Digby of Sealand	Royal National Theatre	Male lead
2014	Tiger Country	Mark	Hampstead Theatre	
2015	Man and Superman	Hector	Royal National Theatre	
2018	The Strange Death of John Doe		Hampstead Theatre	25 May–30 June 2018

Hendrix appeared in several productions whilst training at RADA, including: Company, Measure for Measure, Alcestis, The Recruiting Officer, Look Homeward, Angel, Macbeth, and The White Stocking.

== Filmography ==
=== Television ===
Year	Title	Role	Notes
2011	Silk	Peter (Outdoor Clerk)	Episode: 1.1
2011	Black Mirror	Andrew	Episode: "The National Anthem"
2012	Inspector George Gently	Anthony Baugh	Episode: "Gently with Class"
2013	Call the Midwife	Bob Lacey	Episode: 2.7
2013	Lightfields	Glenn	Episodes: 1.3, 1.4
2013	The White Queen	Edmund Beaufort	Episode: "War at First Hand"
2013	Medics	Simon Denham	TV movie / pilot
2015	Foyle's War	Robert Lucas	Episode: "Trespass"
2016	Marcella	Adrian Cooper	Episodes: 1.2–1.4
2016	The Crown	Billy Wallace	Episodes: "Gloriana", "Gelignite"
2016–present	Midsomer Murders	Detective Sergeant Jamie Winter	Series 19–Present

=== Film ===
Year	Title	Role	Notes
2011	Captain America: The First Avenger	Army Heckler	
2012	Red Tails	Co-Pilot Al	
2015	National Theatre Live: Man and Superman	Hector Malone	
2015	Legend	Hew McCowan	
2015	Suffragette	Government Minister	
2020	The Christmas Ball	Liam	

== Other works ==
- Our Kind of Cruelty by Araminta Hall – narrator of Audible audiobook, along with Eleanor Matsuura
