= The Bass Player and the Blonde =

British TV play and serial (1977–1978)

- DVD cover
- Created by: Roy Clarke
- Directed by: Dennis Vance
- Starring: Edward Woodward
- Country of origin: United Kingdom
- Original language: English
- No. of episodes: 4 (1 pilot)

Production
- Producer: Dennis Vance
- Production company: ATV

Original release
- Release: 14 June 1977 – 22 August 1978

The Bass Player and the Blonde is a television play directed by Dennis Vance and starring Edward Woodward and Jane Wymark. It was created by Roy Clarke and broadcast in the ITV Playhouse anthology series, first broadcast 14 June 1977.

It was followed up with a three-part serial with episodes named from musical terms: "Rondo" (8 August 1978), "Allegro" (15 August 1978), and "Andante" (22 August 1978).

== Plot ==
In the play and the series, George Mangham, a middle aged, debt ridden bass player in a jazz band, falls in love with the wealthy and much younger blonde singer Terry, much to the distress of her father.

== Cast ==
- Edward Woodward as George Mangham
- Jane Wymark as Terry
- Ronald Fraser as Charlie
- Jeremy Sinden as Nigel
- Alfie Bass as the pawnbroker
- Sam Kydd as Max
- Betty McDowall as Beth
- George Sewell as the drummer

== Credits ==
- Producer/Director: Dennis Vance
- Production Company: ATV
- Screenplay: Roy Clarke, Ian Lindsay and Phil Redmond
- Designer: Michael Eve

== Reception ==
Nancy Banks-Smith wrote:

The Bass Player and the Blonde (ATV) is ... a sequel to last year's play of the same name. In spirit it is stylish thirties comedy. Where else (except in Pedro the Fisherman) would a bride, serenaded by her lover run out of the church in her wedding dress pursued by rough diamond Dad and his heavy mob? It has some jolly cameos-they-used-to-be called from, for instance, Alfie Bass as an unintelligible pawn broker. It has Ronald Fraser gloriously abusing his heavies for being too heavy. "You was chosen from many applicants. I'ad to scrape the bottom of the barrel to get as good as you. I want you, standing like greyhounds in the...er...er." It has beautiful lighting and good snappy writing. Forty years ago it would have had Tracy and Hepburn. Now it has Edward Woodward, who sings well and Jane Wymark, who looks nice. Louis B. Mayer would have done it better. But Lew Grade the last tycoon doesn't do it badly.
