= Patrick Wymark =

English actor (1926–1970)

- in Where Eagles Dare (1968)
- Born: Patrick Carl Cheeseman; 11 July 1926; Cleethorpes, Lincolnshire, England
- Died: 20 October 1970 (aged 44); Melbourne, Victoria, Australia
- Resting place: Highgate Cemetery, London
- Monuments: Wymark View, Grimsby
- Education: University College, London; Old Vic Theatre School
- Occupations: Stage, film and television actor
- Years active: 1959–1970
- Television: The Plane Makers (1963–65); The Power Game (1965–69)
- Spouse: Olwen Buck (m. 1953)
- Children: 4, including Jane Wymark
- Relatives: W. W. Jacobs (paternal grandfather-in-law)
- Awards: British Academy Television Award for Best Actor (1965)
- Website: wymark.org.uk

Patrick Wymark (11 July 1926 – 20 October 1970) was an English stage, film and television actor.

== Early life ==
Wymark was born Patrick Carl Cheeseman in Cleethorpes, Lincolnshire. He was brought up in neighbouring Grimsby. He was educated at St Mary's Catholic School and Wintringham Boys' Grammar School in Grimsby, before joining the Royal Navy and serving as a midshipman in the Mediterranean. On leaving the navy, he received a government grant to study at University College London, where he read English and performed in the university's dramatic society.

== Career ==
Wymark dropped out of university to train at the Old Vic Theatre School in London and making his first professional stage appearance in a walk-on part in Othello in 1951. He toured South Africa the following year and then directed plays for the drama department at Stanford University, California.

At the Shakespeare Memorial Theatre in Stratford-upon-Avon, Wymark played a wide range of Shakespearean roles, including Dogberry in Much Ado About Nothing, Stephano in The Tempest, Marullus in Julius Caesar and Bottom in A Midsummer Night's Dream. Other stage credits included the title role in Danton's Death and, with the Royal Shakespeare Company (RSC), Yepikhodov in The Cherry Orchard. His theatre roles also included Bosola in a RSC production of John Webster's The Duchess of Malfi in 1960.

In television, Wymark was best known for his role as the machiavellian businessman John Wilder in the twin drama series The Plane Makers and The Power Game (which were broadcast from 1963 to 1969), which led to offers of real company directorships and the British Academy Television Award for Best Actor in 1965. However, Wymark was a gentle person in real life and was, by his own admission, ignorant of business matters. He considered the character of Wilder a "bastard" and was described by his wife Olwen as "the most inefficient, dreamy muddler in the world." In the mid-1960s, Wymark was considered as the replacement for William Hartnell in the title role of Doctor Who.

In 1960, Wymark appeared in the Danger Man television series episode entitled "An Affair of State" as the corrupt police commissioner Ortiz.

Wymark's film appearances included: Children of the Damned (1964), Operation Crossbow (1965), Repulsion (1965), Where Eagles Dare (1968), Witchfinder General (1968), Battle of Britain (1969), Journey to the Far Side of the Sun (aka Doppelgänger; 1969), The Blood on Satan's Claw (1970) and Cromwell (1970)

== Personal life ==
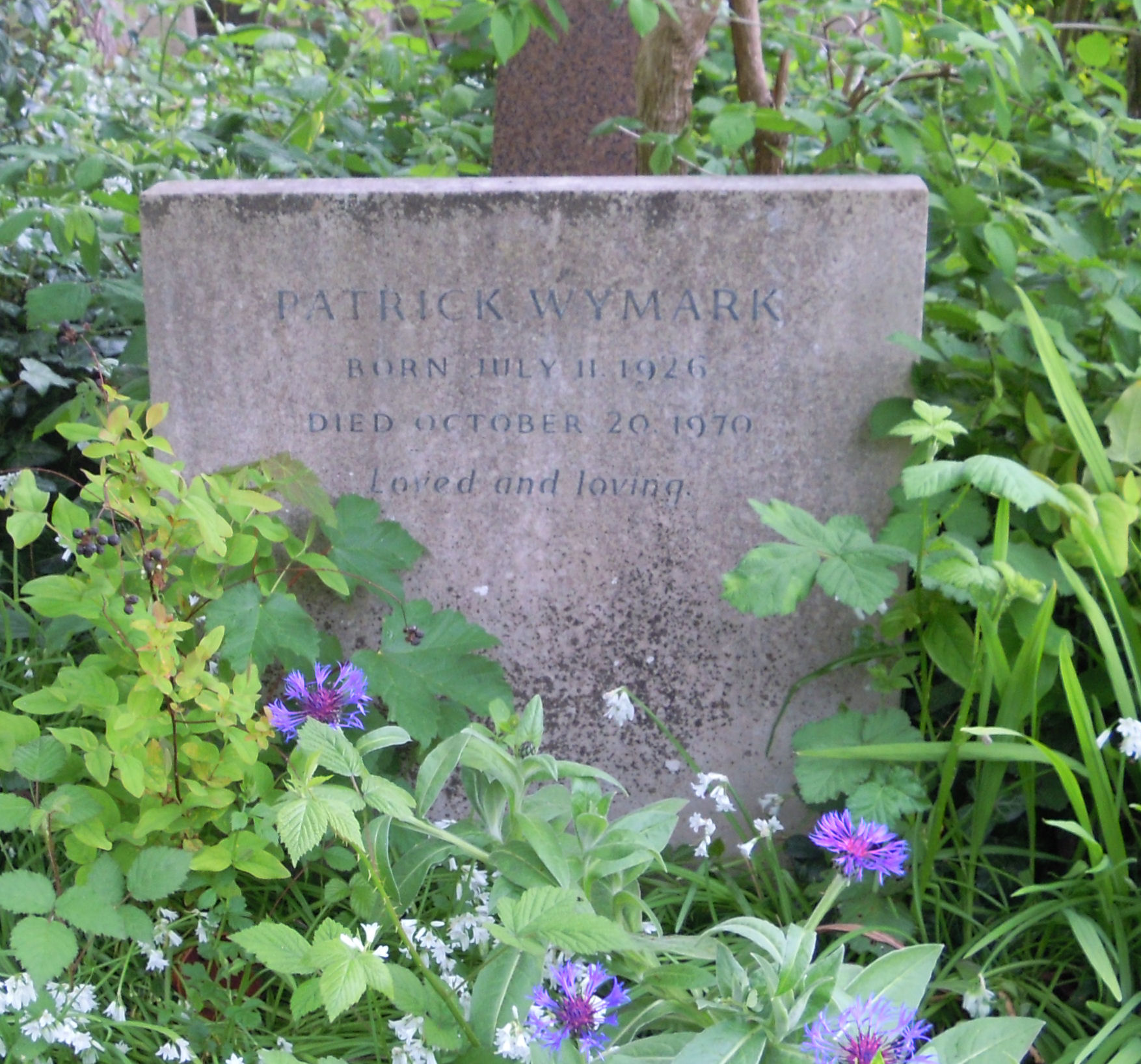
Wymark's grave in Highgate Cemetery

Wymark married American playwright Olwen Buck (known as Olwen Wymark) in 1953; the couple met while both were students at University College, London. He took his acting name from his wife's paternal grandfather, the writer William Wymark Jacobs. The couple lived near Parliament Hill in Hampstead, London, and had four children, including the future actress Jane Wymark. Wymark died suddenly in Melbourne, Australia on 20 October 1970, aged 44, of a heart attack in his hotel room. He had been due to star in the play Sleuth at the Comedy Theatre three days later. On the night of his death, he was to appear on the TV variety programme In Melbourne Tonight. He, guest American actor Richard Deacon and host Stuart Wagstaff had just appeared together in a TV production of Hans Christian Andersen stories and his non-appearance led to several jokes by Wagstaff and Deacon. Host Wagstaff was informed of Wymark's death mid-way through the programme and announced it at the end.

Wymark was a Roman Catholic. He was buried at Highgate Cemetery in London, after a Requiem Mass. A memorial service was later held at Brompton Oratory. Wymark View—located in his home town, Grimsby—is named after him.

== Selected filmography ==
- The League of Gentlemen (1960) as Wylie
- The Criminal (1960) as Sol
- West 11 (1963) as Father Hogan
- Dr. Syn, Alias the Scarecrow (1963) as Joseph Ransley
- Children of the Damned (1964) as Commander
- The Secret of Blood Island (1964) as Major Jocomo
- Operation Crossbow (1965) as Prime Minister Winston Churchill
- Repulsion (1965) as Landlord
- The Skull (1965) as Marco
- The Psychopath (1966) as Inspector Holloway
- Woman Times Seven (1967) as Henri (segment "At The Opera")
- Tell Me Lies (1968) as Guest
- Witchfinder General (1968) as Cromwell
- Where Eagles Dare (1968) as Colonel Wyatt Turner
- Doppelgänger (1969) (alternative title: Journey to the Far Side of the Sun) as Jason Webb
- Battle of Britain (1969) as Air Vice Marshal Trafford Leigh-Mallory
- Cromwell (1970) as The Earl of Strafford
- The Blood on Satan's Claw (1971) as The Judge (posthumous release)
- Chelovek s drugoy storony (1972) as Christian Holm (final film role, posthumous release)
