= Tallulah Haddon =

Actress, artist and model

- Born: Tallulah Rose Haddon; 9 September 1997 (age 28); London, England
- Education: Emanuel School
- Occupation: Actress
- Years active: 2016–present

Tallulah Rose Haddon (born 9 September 1997) is a British actress and multidisciplinary artist.

== Early life ==
Born and raised in South London, Haddon is the child of artist Laura Godfrey-Isaacs and engineer Glen Haddon. They (Note: Haddon uses they/them pronouns.) are Jewish. They have a younger sister, Mirabelle. They were raised in 'rural Suffolk' in a house converted from an old church.

== Career ==
Haddon's art practice has stemmed from performance for screen, subsequently incorporating filmmaking and video. Haddon has appeared in Netflix’s Black Mirror: Bandersnatch (2019), and recently Ridley Scott’s The Last Duel. Since their breakout role in Spaceship (2016) which premiered at BFI London Film Festival, and toured to SXSW they have worked on projects varying from TV to indie shorts. Their TV premiere was in The Living and The Dead (BBC) going on to work with Tom Hardy and Franka Potente (Run Lola Run) in Taboo (BBC/FX). They then played the lead, Leila in (intl Emmy nominated) Kiss Me First; a 6 part Netflix original; which included live action film, acting for motion capture and underwater stunt work. In February 2021, their film Justine, was nominated for a British Independent Film Award. In 2024, they played Hanna, a key role in the Sky Drama The Tattooist of Auschwitz alongside Anna Próchniak.

They received their MFA from Bard College in July 2023.

== Personal life ==
Haddon is non-binary.

== Acting credits ==
=== Film ===
Key
†	Denotes productions that have not yet been released

Year	Title	Role	Notes
2016	Spaceship	Alice	
2016	Sliding	Hannah	Short
2016	Marina and Adrienne	Adrienne	Short
2017	Modern Life Is Rubbish	Holly	
2018	Black Mirror: Bandersnatch	Kitty	Interactive film
2019	You Got It Good	Tallulah	Short
2019	Starboy	Elisheva	Short
2020	Justine	Justine	
2021	Nails	Tiffany	Short
2021	The Last Duel	Marie	
2022	The Loneliest Boy in the World	Chloe	

=== Television ===
Year	Title	Role	Notes
2016	The Living and the Dead	Harriet Denning	Series regular
2017	Taboo	Pearl	Recurring role, 6 episodes
2018	Kiss Me First	Leila Evans/Shadowfax	Lead
2020	Barkskins	Melissande	Series regular
2024	The Tattoist Of Auschwitz	Hannah	Series regular
2025	Brassic	Fay	Series regular

=== Theatre ===
Year	Play	Role	Venue	Notes
2012	Antigone	Chorus	Emanuel School, London	also, Edinburgh Festival Fringe 2012, Edinburgh
2013	The Love of the Nightingale	Chorus	Emanuel School, London	
2014	The Trojan Women	Chorus	Edinburgh Festival Fringe 2014, Edinburgh	
2014	The Cherry Orchard	Anya	Young Vic Theatre, London	

=== Director/Creator ===
Year	Title	Roll	Notes
2018	Rituals In Romance	Co-creator	Theatre
2023	I'm Asking You To Eat It	Director	Film
2024	I'm Sorry For Eating You	Director	Film, In production
