= Caroline Graham (writer) =

English playwright, screenwriter and novelist

- Born: 17 July 1931 (age 95); Nuneaton, Warwickshire, England
- Education: University of Birmingham (MA), Open University
- Occupation: Novelist
- Children: 1
- Writing career
- Genre: Mystery
- Notable work: Chief Inspector Barnaby series

Caroline Graham (born 17 July 1931) is an English playwright, screenwriter and novelist from Nuneaton, Warwickshire. Her Chief Inspector Barnaby novel series was dramatised for television as Midsomer Murders.

== Early life and education ==
Graham was born in Nuneaton, Warwickshire to a working-class family, and attended Nuneaton High School for Girls where her English teacher encouraged her to write. Graham's mother died when she was six and her father remarried when she was 13. At the age of 14, she left school and went to work in Courtaulds Mill as a wefter.

She served in the Women's Royal Naval Service from 1953 to 1955 but eventually ran away because she hated it. She met up with her airforce penpal, Graham Cameron, whom she later married. The couple moved to France, living in a mews house at Versailles where Cameron was stationed as part of his work for the Supreme Headquarters Allied Powers in Europe. She had attended ballet school for three years during their stay in France. After some time, they relocated to Lincoln, England where Graham spent three days a week in London at drama school. They later split up, with Graham moving to London. There, she met a new partner and became pregnant with her son, David.

She studied with the Open University, and in 1991 received a master's degree in theatre studies from the University of Birmingham at the age of 60.

== Career ==
Her first published book was Fire Dance (1982), a romance novel. She is best known as the writer of the Chief Inspector Barnaby series, dramatised for television as Midsomer Murders. The first Inspector Barnaby novel, The Killings at Badger's Drift, was published in 1987. The novel was well received by the mystery community and was named by the Crime Writers' Association as one of "The Top 100 Crime Novels of All Time". It also won the 1989 Macavity Award for "Best First Novel" and was nominated for the same honour at the 1989 Anthony Awards and the 1988 Agatha Awards.

After The Killings at Badger's Drift, Graham wrote six more Inspector Barnaby novels; the last, A Ghost in the Machine, was published in 2004. The first five Inspector Barnaby novels formed the basis of the first five episodes of Midsomer Murders. She has also written for the soap opera Crossroads. She has appeared in a series on detective writers titled Super Sleuths (2006), appeared in one episode of The People's Detective (2010), as well as appearing in episode 3 of Midsomer Murders.

== Selected works ==
=== Chief Inspector Barnaby series ===
- The Killings at Badger's Drift (1987)
- Death of a Hollow Man (1989)
- Death in Disguise (1992)
- Written in Blood (1994)
- Faithful unto Death (1996)
- A Place of Safety (1999)
- A Ghost in the Machine (2004)

=== Others ===
- Fire Dance (1982)
- The Envy of the Stranger (1984)
- Murder at Madingley Grange (1990)
