= Manjinder Virk =

English actress

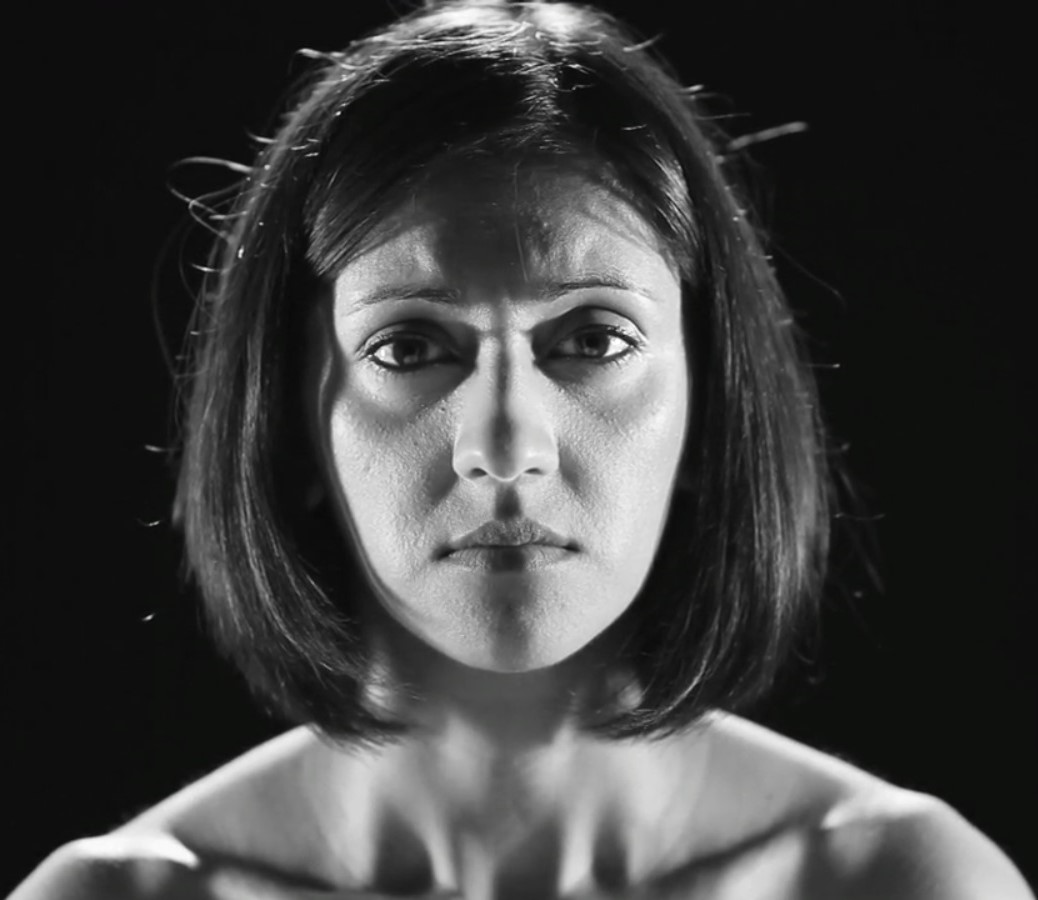
- Virk in Out of Darkness, 2012 short film
- Born: Coventry, England
- Education: De Montfort University
- Occupations: Actress, director, writer
- Years active: 1999-present
- Spouse: Neil Biswas (m. 2007)
- Children: 2

Manjinder Virk is a British actress, director, and writer. She has appeared in the television series Holby City (1999), Doctors (2000), The Bill (2004), The Ghost Squad (2005), Runaway (2009), Skins (2010), Monroe (2011), Hunted (2012), and Midsomer Murders (2016 –2018).

She has also written and directed the short films Forgive (2008) and Out of Darkness (2013), the latter of which she won the Best of Fest award at the Aesthetica Short Film Festival.

== Early life and education ==
Manjinder Virk was born in Coventry, England, to parents of Indian origin. Her mother's name is Jasvir, while her father was Harbhajan Singh Virk. She comes from a family of three children.

She began acting at the Belgrade Youth Theatre in Coventry and went on to become artistic director of Pangram Dance Theatre with her brother, Hardish.

She went on to earn a degree in contemporary dance at De Montfort University in Leicester.

== Career ==
In 1999, Virk began her television career on the British TV series Holby City. She appeared in the soap opera Doctors, as Karen Slater in 2000. In 2003, she wrote a play for a show for touring company Theatre Centre titled Glow. In 2004, she again appeared on the soap opera Doctors to play Laila Khalid, and returned to the show in 2007 as Harpit Jindal. Also in 2007, Virk appeared in Britz as Nasima Wahid.

In 2008, Virk wrote and directed the short film Forgive starring Sacha Dhawan and Abdi Gouhad. She portrayed Lorraine Dunbar in the 2010 documentary The Arbor. For the latter, she earned three nominations: Best Newcomer at the BFI London Film Festival Awards and Best Actress and Newcomer at the British Independent Film Awards. She later had recurring roles on the British medical drama show Monroe in 2011, and the BBC One spy drama series Hunted in 2012. Also in 2012, she wrote and directed another short film, Out of Darkness, starring Tom Hiddleston, Monica Dolan, Andrew Gower, Jimmy Akingbola, Christine Bottomley and Riz Ahmed.

Virk had a recurring role as the coroner the popular detective series Midsomer Murders, from 2016 to 2018. In 2022, Virk appeared as DI Samira Desai in the thriller series Trigger Point alongside Vicky McClure. The following year, she played a grieving mother in an episode of Shetland.

== Personal life ==
She met husband Neil Biswas on the set of the TV drama Bradford riots in 2007. In 2013, they were living in Brixton, South London, and have two children.

== Filmography ==
Year	Title	Role	Notes
1999	Holby City	Junior Nurse	TV series (1 episode: "Staying Alive: Part 2")
2000	Doctors	Karen Slater	TV series (1 episode: "Game Over")
2003	Ready When You Are, Mr. McGill	Sue	TV film
2003	Two Minutes	Ruby	Short
2004	The Bill	Khadija Miah	TV series (4 episodes)
2004	Doctors	Laila Khalid	TV series (1 episode: "Moving On")
2004	Swiss Toni	Jenny	TV series
2004	Green Wing	Theatre Nurse	TV series (1 episode: "Tangled Webs")
2005	Child of Mine	WPC	TV film
2005	The Ghost Squad	WPC Shareen Charan	TV series (1 episode: "Colour Blind")
2006	Bradford Riots	Shazia	TV film
2006	Orange People	Amber	Short
2007	World of Wrestling	Princess	Short
2007	Doctors	Harpit Jindal	TV series (1 episode: "Wings and Needles")
2007	Comedy Showcase	News Reporter	TV series (1 episode: "Plus One")
2007	Britz	Nasima Wahid	TV film
2007	Famous Last Words		TV short
2008	The Blue Tower	Asha	
2009	Runaway	PC Brinkley	TV series (2 episodes)
2010	Skins	Doctor Berg	TV series (1 episode: "Katie")
2010	The Arbor	Lorraine Dunbar	Documentary
2011	Lost Paradise	Ismat	Short
2011	Monroe	Sally Fortune	TV series (6 episodes)
2012	The Thick of It	Journalist 1	TV series (1 episode)
2012	Hunted	Simran Baines	TV series (4 episodes)
2012	Broken Eternity	Woman	Short
2013	Out of Darkness	Female	Short; also writer, director and producer
2014	Checkpost	Ria	Short
2015	Call the Midwife	Ameera Khatun	TV series (Episode #4.5)
2015	History's Future	Phoebe	Post-production
2015	Ordinary Lies	Marianne	TV series
2016–2018	Midsomer Murders	Dr Kam Karimore	Series 18–19
2017	Bad Move	Meena	TV series (6 episodes)
2022	Trigger Point	DI Samira Desai	TV series (6 episodes)
2023	Shetland	Farida Sadat	TV series (1 episode: "Episode 5")
2025	Virdee	Mandip Verdee	TV series (3 episodes)

== Awards and nominations ==
Virk was nominated in 2010 for Best Newcomer at the BFI London Film Festival Awards and Best Actress and Newcomer at the British Independent Film Awards, both for her role in The Arbor. She was one of the UK Stars of Tomorrow in Screen International in 2007. She was also nominated for Asian Woman of Achievement Award in 2008.

In 2013, for her short film Out of Darkness, Virk won Best of Fest award at the Aesthetica Short Film Festival.
