= Jason Hughes (actor) =

Welsh actor (born 1970)

- Born: 15 December 1970 (age 55); Porthcawl, Wales
- Occupation: Actor
- Years active: 1992–present
- Notable work: Midsomer Murders (2005–2013, 2016)
- Spouse: Natasha Dahlberg
- Children: 3

Jason Hughes (born 15 December 1970) is a Welsh actor best known for playing Sergeant Ben Jones in the ITV series Midsomer Murders (2005–2013) and for the BBC drama This Life (1996–1997), in which he played lawyer Warren Jones. Hughes has also worked extensively in theatre, including the 1999 re-enactment of Our Country's Good as the Second Lieutenant Ralph Clark.

== Early life ==
Hughes was born in Porthcawl, Wales, and spent most of his early childhood there with his family. He is of Welsh and Italian descent. His grandfather, Raldo Carpinini, was the son of an Italian immigrant from Bardi, Emilia-Romagna, who had settled in Ammanford. Hughes' great-grandfather was originally trained to lay train tracks, but eventually began an ice cream business. Hughes' maternal grandfather was a policeman in Porthcawl.

As a teenager, Hughes played both rugby and cricket and had hopes of pursuing sport as a career, playing county cricket until aged 18. He became interested in acting while taking drama classes at a local comprehensive school, and was encouraged by a teacher to apply for the National Youth Theatre of Wales. Hughes was also greatly inspired by Welsh actor Anthony Hopkins.

In 1987, at the National Youth Theatre of Wales, the 16-year-old Hughes became close friends with Michael Sheen, who lived in the same residence hall. They had much in common, as both had come to acting from a sports background and were musically inclined. Hughes had earlier learnt to play guitar and piano. He also met actors Ruth Jones, Rob Brydon and Hywel Simons; the latter being a school friend of Sheen's.

Hughes studied drama at the London Academy of Music and Dramatic Art, during which time he shared a house with Sheen and Simons. He went on to perform in the 1999 production of Look Back in Anger with Sheen at the National Youth Theatre, and Caligula at the Donmar.

== Career ==
Hughes' first big role was lawyer Warren Jones in This Life which aired from 1996 to 1997. The show revolves around a group of young professionals sharing a house in London and is mainly focussed on their turbulent love lives. It was the UK's hottest drama show of the 1990s and the show won five awards including the Royal Television Society's award for best drama. Hughes's character Warren was openly gay, which was considered groundbreaking at the time, as it was still rare to see such a prominent, positive portrayal of a gay character on primetime television in the mid-90s. Many young gay men, pleased at seeing their experience represented on-screen, wrote to Hughes about their stories of coming out to their families.

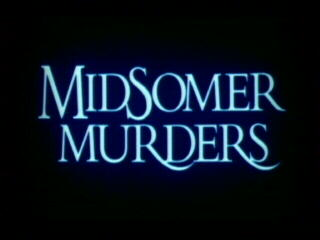
Midsomer Murders opening text

In 2005, Hughes began starring in the murder mystery television series Midsomer Murders as Detective Sergeant Ben Jones. The show revolves around two detectives who solve gory and unique murders amongst the tranquil setting of Midsomer County. Hughes was originally told to speak in an English accent as his Welsh accent did not fit the character criteria, but the character's background was then changed, allowing him to use his own Welsh accent. Hughes was aware of the show's repertoire after watching a few episodes and he knew the standards the directors were looking for. In the years prior to the role, Hughes's wife had had a second child and he was shooting a film in Ireland where all his income went into paying bills. After feeling "irresponsible" and "letting myself, wife and children down", when his agent spoke to him about an interview for Midsomer Murders which gave him a steady ten months of work a year; he described it as a "gift from the angels". After two years in this role, Hughes had a steady pay cheque, which caused him to sign-up for another two years, then another three. In 2013, he left Midsomer Murders but returned for one episode of Series 19 in 2017. After leaving Midsomer Murders, he briefly moved to Hollywood, but soon decided to return to the United Kingdom. He has since played supporting roles in dramas such as Marcella and The Pact.

In 1999, Hughes played Ralph Clark in Our Country's Good. Clark is the second lieutenant who is ordered to gather a group of negative and demoralised convicts into a cast that is able to re-enact Farquhar's The Performing Officer. He played Cliff in a 1999 production of Look Back in Anger.

The 2015 play, Violence and Son, by Gary Owen is about a Welsh 17-year-old boy whose mother has recently died from cancer. He is forced to live with his biological father, Rick (Jason Hughes). The plot thickens when he meets Jen, a girl who shares his passion for Doctor Who. However, she already has a boyfriend, a rugby player called Jorden.

Hughes played in a band, Butterfly Macqueen, playing guitar and singing backup vocals. The band last performed in Brighton on 12 February 2009 at the opening of the American Music Club.

== Personal life ==
Hughes is a father of three children, Molly, Max and Carys. He is married to jewellery-designer Natasha Dahlberg, formerly an actress. Hughes calls himself a family man and part of what caused him to leave Midsomer Murders was being away from home for up to six months. When not acting or spending time with his family, Hughes goes swimming and does yoga.

== Filmography ==
=== Film ===
Year	Title	Role	Notes
1993	Cat Without Neighbours		Short
1996	King Girl	Mr Whitehead	TV Movie
1999	The Flint Street Nativity	Warren Pipe / Joseph	TV Movie
2000	House!	Gavin	
2001	Phoenix Blue	Ralph	
2002	Shooters	Charlie Franklin	
2002	Tarot Mechanic	The Mechanic	Short
2002	Killing Me Softly	Jake	
2002	Plain Jane	Harry Bruce	TV Movie
2004	Say Sorry		Short
2005	Feeder	Bob	Short
2005	Red Mercury	Collins	
2006	Dead Long Enough	Ben Jones	
2013	Dante's Daemon	Daniel Teal / Trench	
2016	Crow	Millward	
2018	We the Kings	Tony	
2022	Save the Cinema	Aled	
2026	Motherwitch	Sergeant Croyce	

=== Television ===
Year	Title	Role	Notes
1994	London's Burning	Tim James	Episode: "Episode #7.3"
1995	Peak Practice	Robbo Gibbs	Episode: "Fighting Chance"
1995	The Bill	Craig	Episode: "Unfamiliar Territory"
1995	Castles	Simon	Episode: "Episode #1.22"
1996	Wales Playhouse	Steve	Episode: "Strangers in the Night"
1996–97, 2007	This Life	Warren Jones	19 episodes
1996, 2002	Casualty	Carl Williams, Kev	2 episodes
1997–98	Harry Enfield and Chums	Jason	2 episodes
1999	Hang the DJ	Brad	
2000	Brand Spanking New Show		2 episodes
2003	Waking the Dead	Andrew Cross	2 episodes
2004	Mine All Mine	Gethin Morris	5 episodes
2005–13, 2017	Midsomer Murders	Ben Jones	53 episodes
2009	Coming Up	Mark	Episode: "Pornography"
2015	Archer	Dafydd	Episode: "Achub y Morfilod"
2017	Death in Paradise	Elliot Taylor	Episode: "The Impossible Murder"
2017	Three Girls	DC Sandy Guthrie	3 episodes
2018	Marcella	Vince Whitman	7 episodes
2021	The Pact	Max	6 episodes
2024	McDonald & Dodds	Clive Saunders	Episode: "Wedding Fever"
2025	Beyond Paradise	Hugo Digsby	Episode: "S3.E4"
2025	Art Detectives	Greg Kemp	Episode: "S1.E6 Final Bid"
2026	Power: The Downfall of Huw Edwards	Mick Granger	Docudrama film

== Theatre ==
- A Slice of Saturday Night (1992, Theater Auf Tournee, Germany — tour)
- Macbeth (1994, Theatre Clwyd)
- The Unexpected Guest (1994, Theatre Royal, Windsor)
- Nothing to Pay (1995, Thin Language)
- Phaedra's Love (1996, Royal Court Theatre — staged reading)
- Badfinger (1997, Donmar Warehouse)
- The Illusion (1997, Royal Exchange, Manchester)
- Snake in the Grass (1997, The Old Vic)
- The Herbal Bed (1998, Royal Shakespeare Company)
- A Real Classy Affair (1998, Royal Court Theatre)
- Violence and Son (Royal Court Theatre Upstairs).
- Look Back in Anger (1999, Lyttelton Theatre)
- In Flame (2000, New Ambassador's Theatre)
- Kiss Me Like You Mean It (2001, Soho Theatre)
- A Wing and a Prayer (2002, Battersea Arts Centre Studio)
- Fight for Barbara (2003, Theatre Royal, BathTheatre Royal, Bath)
- Design for Living (2003, Theatre Royal, Bath)
- Caligula (2003, Donmar Warehouse)
- 4.48 Psychosis (2004, Royal Court Theatre and US tour)
- In the Next Room (or The Vibrator Play) (2013, St. James)
- Our Country's Good (2015, Olivier Theatre)
- The Goat, or Who Is Sylvia? (2017, Theatre Royal Haymarket)
- On Bear Ridge (2019, The Royal Court Theatre, London)
- To Kill a Mockingbird (2022, Gielgud Theatre, London)
- Shed: Exploded View (2024, Royal Exchange Theatre)
- Nye (2025, Olivier Theatre)

== Radio ==
- Green Baize Dream (1995)
- Cadfael: "Dead Man's Ransom" (1995)
- A Clockwork Orange (1998)
- Cold Calling (2003)
- Time for Mrs. Milliner (2003)
- Bubble (2004)
- The Guest Before You (2004)
- School Runs (2006)
- Inspector Steine (2007)
- Gite a la Mer (2007)
- The Pale Horse (2017)
- Severn (2024)

== Audio books ==
- Framed (2006) (Audible)
