= Laura Howard =

English actress

- Born: Laura Simmons; 1977 (age 48–49); Chiswick, London, England
- Occupation: Actress
- Years active: 1992–present
- Known for: Midsomer Murders; So Haunt Me

Laura Howard (born as Laura Simmons; 1977 in Chiswick, London) is an English actress. She is best known for her role as Cully Barnaby in the long-running British crime-mystery police procedural Midsomer Murders.

== Biography ==
Howard's first major role came in 1992, playing the teenage daughter Tammy Rokeby in the BBC comedy series So Haunt Me. She went on to play Cully Barnaby, the daughter of John Nettles' character Tom, in Midsomer Murders from 1997 to 2011. Howard has also had a starring role in the Jack Rosenthal drama Interview Day and its sequel Cold Enough For Snow. Her other UK television credits include Soldier Soldier, The Bill, Doctors and Casualty.

Howard has appeared in numerous UK theatre productions, including the premiere of Life of Riley by Alan Ayckbourn. In June 2012, she appeared in Ayckbourn's The Norman Conquests at the Liverpool Playhouse. In 2014, she starred in Invincible by Torben Betts at the Orange Tree Theatre and then its transfer to the St James's Theatre, London. In 2016, she appeared in two plays as part of the Royal Shakespeare Company's "Making Mischief" Season.

== Filmography ==
=== Film ===
Year	Title	Role	Notes
2009	Be Good	Woman at Lake	Short
2011	Get Well Soon	Janet	Short
2025	What We Hide	Female Deputy	Drama
2025	Invincible	Emily	Comedy drama

=== Television ===
Year	Title	Role	Notes
1990	Casualty	Victoria Leach	Episode: "Close to Home"
1992	Covington Cross	Alexandra Mullens	Episodes: "Eviction", "Armus Returns"
1992–1994	So Haunt Me	Tammy Rokeby	Main role
1995	The Bill	Erica	Episode: "Day of Rest"
1996	Interview Day	Pippa	TV film
1996	Soldier Soldier	Deborah Briggs	Recurring role (series 6)
1997	Cold Enough for Snow	Pippa 'Muffin' Lloyd	TV film
1997–2011	Midsomer Murders	Cully Barnaby	Series 1–13; 43 episodes
1998	Queen's Park Story	Lily	TV short
2000	The Bill	Star	"Beasts"
2004	Doctors	Jane Taylor	Episode: "What If"
2004	The Hotel in Amsterdam	Gillian	TV film
2006	Casualty	Annie McQueen	Episode: "Angels and Demons"
2012	Doctors	Zoe Durand	Episode: "Matthew & Son"
2012	Casualty	Tania Sullivan	Episode: "The Only One You Love"
2013	EastEnders	Teacher	1 episode
2014	Young Dracula	Sally Giles	Main (series 5)
2014	Doctors	Amy Dobson	Episode: "Love, Honour, Betray"
2014	Casualty	Eva Heggarty	Episode: "Who Cares?"
2015	The Delivery Man	Melanie	Episode: "Truth"
2015	Cuffs	Lynne	Episode: "1.5"
2016	Casualty	Carly Swinford	Episode: "Fall on Me"
2019	Call the Midwife	Cissy Pilkington	Series 8 Episode 6
2021	Late Night Mash	Visit Britain advert narrator	Voice only
2023	Funny Woman	Audrey	Series 1 episode 1
2023	COBRA	DCI Smith	Series 3 episode 3: "Rebellion 3"
2024	Dune: Prophecy	Orla Richese	2 episodes
