= Midsomer Murders =

British detective television series

- Genre: Drama; Detective; Mystery thriller
- Created by: Anthony Horowitz; Douglas Watkinson
- Based on: Chief Inspector Barnaby by Caroline Graham
- Starring: John Nettles; Daniel Casey; Barry Jackson; Jane Wymark; Laura Howard; Toby Jones; John Hopkins; Jason Hughes; Kirsty Dillon; Neil Dudgeon; Fiona Dolman; Tamzin Malleson; Gwilym Lee; Manjinder Virk; Nick Hendrix; Annette Badland
- Theme music composer: Jim Parker
- Country of origin: United Kingdom
- Original language: English
- No. of series: 25
- No. of episodes: 144 aired (UK) + 1 special documentary (list of episodes)

Production
- Executive producers: Brian True-May (1–89); Jo Wright (90–115); Kim Crowther (108–110); Jonathan Fisher (116–122); Michele Buck (from 116); Louise Pedersen (from 124); Neil Dudgeon (from 133)
- Producer: Betty Willingale
- Cinematography: Colin Munn; Graham Frake
- Editor: Derek Bain
- Running time: 89–102 minutes
- Production company: Bentley Productions

Original release
- Network: ITV
- Release: 23 March 1997 – present

Midsomer Murders is a British mystery television series, adapted by Anthony Horowitz and Douglas Watkinson from the novels in the Chief Inspector Barnaby book series created by Caroline Graham. It has been broadcast on the ITV network since its premiere on 23 March 1997. The series focuses on various murder cases that take place within small country villages across the fictional English county of Midsomer, and the efforts of the senior police detective and his partner within the fictional Midsomer Constabulary to solve the crime by determining who the culprit is and the motive for their actions. It features a mixture of lighthearted whimsy and dark humour, as well as a notable soundtrack with a title theme that includes a theremin.

The programme has featured two lead stars: from its premiere in 1997, John Nettles as Detective Chief Inspector (DCI) Tom Barnaby, until his retirement from the drama in February 2011; then Neil Dudgeon as DCI John Barnaby, Tom's younger cousin, since March 2011. The supporting cast has included Jane Wymark, Barry Jackson, Daniel Casey, John Hopkins, Jason Hughes, Gwilym Lee and Nick Hendrix. Midsomer Murders remains a popular feature in British television schedules and has been broadcast internationally in over 200 countries and territories.

== Summary ==
Midsomer Murders is a detective drama set in England. The stories revolve around the efforts of Detective Chief Inspector Tom Barnaby, and later his successor, cousin John Barnaby, to solve numerous murders that take place in the picturesque but deadly villages of the fictional county of Midsomer. The Barnabys have worked with several different sergeants throughout the run of the show: Detective Sergeant (DS) Gavin Troy (Daniel Casey), DS Dan Scott (John Hopkins), DS Ben Jones (Jason Hughes), DS Charlie Nelson (Gwilym Lee) and DS Jamie Winter (Nick Hendrix).

== Production ==
Filming of Midsomer Murders began in the autumn of 1996, and the first episode, "The Killings at Badger's Drift", was broadcast in the United Kingdom on 23 March 1997. This inaugural episode was the highest-rated single drama programme of 1997, watched by 13.5 million viewers. Throughout its run, the feature-length drama has attracted many well-known accomplished actors from the stage and screen in guest-starring roles.

Anthony Horowitz and the original producers, Betty Willingale and Brian True-May, created the series. Horowitz adapted the majority of the early episodes from the original works by Caroline Graham. Current writers include Helen Jenkins, Jeff Povey, Nicholas Hicks-Beach, Julia Gilbert and Maria Ward.

Initially John Nettles acted in the role of Detective Chief Inspector Tom Barnaby. Nettles' character retired at the end of 2010, after the 13th series of eight episodes; his last episode was "Fit for Murder". Neil Dudgeon replaced him in the 14th series, playing Tom Barnaby's cousin, DCI John Barnaby, who was seen in a series 13 episode, "The Sword of Guillaume". Dudgeon made his first appearance in Midsomer Murders in the series 4 episode "Garden of Death", in which he played the role of a tongue-in-cheek gardener, Daniel Bolt, rather interested in sex.

Series 20 began in the UK on ITV on 10 March 2019, with episode 1, "The Ghosts of Causton Abbey". In the US, the entire six-episode series was immediately released on the streaming services Acorn TV and BritBox, and became available on Netflix after the UK broadcast schedule had finished. The show was removed from Netflix in October 2019; only the first 19 series had been shown on the service. Series 20 onward have never been shown on Netflix in US or Canada. As of January, 2021, series 1–20 can be seen in the US on IMDb TV and Tubi TV.

The show's official social media confirmed that production of series 21 began in March 2019. As with series 20, series 21 was initially released in the USA. It premiered on Acorn TV and BritBox on 1 December 2019, before airing in the UK in January 2020.

Published in "The Cinemaholic" in Aug 2024, they have "learned that the network has joined Acorn TV to renew Midsomer Murders for its twenty-fifth season. The instalment’s filming began in the United Kingdom in the spring of 2025."

In October 2025, ITV announced that a 26th series had been commissioned.

=== Setting ===
Midsomer is a fictional English county. The county town is Causton, a medium-sized town where Detective Chief Inspector Barnaby lives with his wife and where the Criminal Investigation Department is located. Much of the popularity of the series arises from the incongruity of sudden violence in a picturesque and peaceful rural setting. Various clues in several episodes hint that Midsomer might actually cover the areas of Berkshire and part of northern Hampshire. This may be supported by the episode "Dead in the Water" where a body is found in the River Thames.

Many of the villages and small towns of the county have the word "Midsomer" in their name; this is inspired in part by the real county of Somerset, and specifically, its actual town of Midsomer Norton, and became a naming convention within the show. Midsomer Wellow and Causton are derived from the names of real Somerset villages Wellow and Corston.

Each episode usually contains several murders — usually three per episode —, the high body count being a well-known feature of the show. Despite this, the culprit is almost never a serial killer — very frequently the murderer is driven by circumstance to compound his or her crimes, and keeps killing to cover up the original murder.

Humour is a main feature of the series. There is often dark comedy, such as a woman being murdered with a wheel of cheese, and many scenes are examples of "dramedy" (comic drama or dramatic comedy). According to Radio Times when describing the episode "Death and the Divas" (series 15, episode 4): "Midsomer Murders never takes itself too seriously but here it's got its tongue so far into its cheek, it hurts."

Nostalgia has also been a feature of the show, especially in its Nettles era. Most episodes have been set in hermetic rural villages of a kind that were already changing rapidly by the time the series began, Nettles opined in a 2003 interview. The old-fashioned settings are true to the Graham novels: "Although the books are set in the present", wrote one reviewer, Graham's country villages "seem to come from another time". "The spirit is obviously of the '50s", Nettles remarked, and the less crowded, less complicated village/world was clearly part of the books' appeal.

=== Filming locations ===
Causton is represented by a number of towns including Thame and Wallingford, in Oxfordshire.

The Six Bells, a pub in Warborough, Oxfordshire, repeatedly features as the Black Swan in the Midsomer village of Badger's Drift. The Bull & Butcher, the village pub in Turville, Buckinghamshire, featured in both "Murder on St. Malley's Day" (renamed as The Chalk and Gown) and in "Schooled in Murder" (renamed as The Spotted Cow).

Filming took place on Sunday 11 August 2013 at White Waltham Airfield, southwest of Maidenhead, for episode 4 of Series 16, "The Flying Club".

The Buckinghamshire tourism authority announced in 2021 the launching of three themed tours of locations in the county that have been used to film the series.

In "The Killings of Copenhagen" – number five in the sixteenth series and the 100th episode overall – several scenes are filmed on location in central Copenhagen, like Rådhuspladsen ("the City Hall Square"), Nyhavn ("New Port") with its canal and old colourful houses, a Danish countryside church, and at the circular courtyard inside the Copenhagen Police Headquarters building. The murder in Copenhagen is one of three within the entire series (until episode 114, at least) that take place outside the fictional county of Midsomer, the others being in Wales where DCI Tom Barnaby (John Nettles) and DS Ben Jones (Jason Hughes) travel in "Death and Dust" and Brighton where Inspector John Barnaby (Neil Dudgeon) is introduced.

== Characters ==
Table key: Main = Main character R = Recurring character G = Guest

Characters and the series where they appeared
Character	Actor	Series																							
Character	Actor	1	2	3	4	5	6	7	8	9	10	11	12	13	14	15	16	17	18	19	20	21	22	23	24
DCI Tom Barnaby	John Nettles	Main	Main	Main	Main	Main	Main	Main	Main	Main	Main	Main	Main	Main											
Joyce Barnaby	Jane Wymark	Main	Main	Main	Main	Main	Main	Main	Main	Main	Main	Main	Main	Main											
DS Gavin Troy	Daniel Casey	Main	Main	Main	Main	Main	Main	Main				G													
Dr. George Bullard	Barry Jackson	Main	R	G	Main	R	Main	Main	Main	Main	Main	Main	Main	Main	Main										
Dr. Dan Peterson	Toby Jones		R	Main																					
DS Daniel Scott	John Hopkins							Main	Main																
DS Benjamin Jones	Jason Hughes									Main	Main	Main	Main	Main	Main	Main				G					
DC Gail Stephens	Kirsty Dillon										R	Main	Main	Main											
DCI John Barnaby	Neil Dudgeon													R	Main	Main	Main	Main	Main	Main	Main	Main	Main	Main	Main
Sarah Barnaby	Fiona Dolman														Main	Main	Main	Main	Main	Main	Main	Main	Main	Main	Main
Dr. Kate Wilding	Tamzin Malleson														R	Main	Main	Main							
DS Charlie Nelson	Gwilym Lee																Main	Main	Main						
Dr. Kam Karimore	Manjinder Virk																		Main	Main					
DS Jamie Winter	Nick Hendrix																			Main	Main	Main	Main	Main	Main
Dr. Oliver Marcet	Michael Obiora																			G					
Petra Antonescu	Anamaria Marinca																			G					
Dr. Fleur Perkins	Annette Badland																				Main	Main	Main	Main	Main

== Episodes ==
The pilot episode of Midsomer Murders was shown on 23 March 1997. 144 episodes have been produced across 25 series. As of 30 December 2025, 138 episodes have been broadcast in the UK, comprising 24 series. New series may air in different territories before the UK. Air dates may vary by region.

Series	Episodes	Originally released	
Series	Episodes	First released	Last released
Pilot		23 March 1997	
1	4	22 March 1998	6 May 1998
2	4	20 January 1999	19 September 1999
3	4	31 December 1999	5 February 2000
4	6	10 September 2000	23 September 2001
5	4	16 June 2002	22 September 2002
6	5	3 January 2003	31 January 2003
7	7	2 November 2003	25 December 2004
8	8	10 October 2004	2 October 2005
9	8	9 October 2005	17 September 2006
10	8	12 November 2006	11 May 2008
11	7	1 January 2008	5 May 2010
12	7	22 July 2009	14 April 2010
13	8	12 May 2010	2 February 2011
14	8	23 March 2011	11 January 2012
15	6	1 February 2012	30 January 2013
16	5	24 December 2013	12 February 2014
17	4	28 January 2015	18 February 2015
18	6	6 January 2016	17 February 2016
19	6	18 December 2016	20 May 2018
20	6	10 March 2019	14 January 2020
21	4	21 January 2020	28 March 2021
22	6	4 April 2021	27 August 2023
23	4	14 April 2024	10 November 2024
24	4	29 December 2025	TBA
25	4	TBA	TBA
26	4	TBA	TBA

=== 20th anniversary special ===
In June 2019, British-American streaming service Acorn TV began streaming a 20th Anniversary Special presented by John Nettles. The one-hour documentary brings together former and current actors on the show as well as producers and others working behind the scene to discuss memorable moments from the past 20 series and the peculiar quirks that have made the show a success.

=== 25th anniversary documentary ===
In May 2022, ITV announced that there would be a documentary celebrating the show's 25th anniversary.

Entitled Midsomer Murders – 25 Years of Mayhem it featured contributions from cast members including John Nettles, Neil Dudgeon, Jane Wymark, Fiona Dolman, Daniel Casey, Jason Hughes and Annette Badland, as well as writer Jeff Povey and producer Ian Strachan. It also delved behind the scenes of filming series 23 and highlighted pre-fame appearances by actors such as Orlando Bloom and Henry Cavill.

ITV subsequently announced that the one-hour documentary would air on the channel on Sunday 29 May 2022 at 7pm.

== Controversy ==
In March 2011, series producer Brian True-May was suspended by All3Media after telling the TV listings magazine Radio Times that the programme did not have any non-white characters because the series was "the last bastion of Englishness and I want to keep it that way". When challenged about the term "Englishness" and whether that would exclude ethnic minorities, True-May responded: "Well, it should do, and maybe I'm not politically correct." He later went on to say that he wanted to make a programme "that appeals to a certain audience, which seems to succeed." True-May's comments were investigated by the production company. He was reinstated, having apologised "if his remarks gave unintended offence to any viewers", but subsequently stepped down as producer. ITV said it was "shocked and appalled" at True-May's comments, which were "absolutely not shared by anyone at ITV".

True-May's replacement, Jo Wright, confirmed that she was committed to on-screen diversity when she took over the helm, saying: "I feel strongly that a range of ethnic groups should be represented on screen. And that will be reflected in some of the episodes in the new series with key guest casting. I will cast the series in the same way as I always do, by starting with the best script. And a good script will include a variety of different characters." In series 15, Asian actors played central characters for the first time, in the episode "Written in the Stars". Black characters also began to appear starting in that series. Beginning with series 18, the show gained an Asian member for its main cast: pathologist Kam Karimore, played by Manjinder Virk. However, she left at the end of series 19.

Some episodes caused controversy when broadcast in daytime hours due to their violence; an episode broadcast on ITV1 at 4pm in February 2007 (and again in May 2007) contained scenes of strangulation and an ostensible shotgun suicide as well as the offensive words bloody and bastard, attracting six complaints to Ofcom that, although children were not the target audience, the timeslot made it possible children were watching. Another episode aired in the same timeslot in May 2007 similarly attracted six complaints for further strong language (bastard and shit) and a scene where a character fatally cuts his throat with a razor during a play performance. With these broadcasts, Ofcom found ITV in breach of three of its rules.

== Broadcast ==
In 2004, Midsomer Murders was among the three most-sold British TV shows worldwide, whether as TV programming or DVD. As of 2016, Midsomer Murders had been sold to more than 200 countries around the world.

In Australia, first-run episodes and repeats are screened on the national free-to-air network ABC with repeats also shown on the Nine Network channel, 9Gem. The series was originally only aired on the Nine Network. Repeat screenings are also aired on the subscription channels UKTV and 13th Street. A measure of the success of the series in Australia is that repeats of the series still rate highly and often feature in the nation's top twenty shows in national surveys.

In Canada, the series is broadcast on TVOntario and Book Television in Ontario, on Knowledge in British Columbia, and via American PBS channels available throughout southern parts of Canada. As of May 2019, the first thirteen series are currently available in Canada on Amazon Prime Video, while only series 21 is available on Britbox. The first nineteen series are also available on streaming service/app Tubi and Acorn.

In Ireland, the series is aired on Virgin Media Three every Monday night at 8 pm. It is one of the channel's highest-rated shows.

In New Zealand, the series was broadcast on TVNZ 1 and it was broadcast for a number of years on the free-to-air channel Prime.

In the United States, the series was first aired by A&E, which broadcast "The Killings at Badger's Drift" on 28 June 1998 and followed with the next four episodes over the 1998–99 series. The show remained on A&E for many years until it was syndicated by American Public Television for broadcast on public television stations. All 24 series are currently available on the streaming service Acorn TV, which also offers the programme in Canada. The show was also broadcast on Ion Mystery and is currently on Ion Plus, and it has a dedicated channel on the streaming service Pluto TV.

The Paramount Channel broadcasts episode reruns daily.

PBS also occasionally shows Midsomer Murders on some stations from time to time.

Series 26, consisting of 4 Episodes, was made available on ABC iView (ABC Australia) on 7 November 2026.

== Soundtracks ==
Composed by Jim Parker, the main theme is a moderate-tempo waltz, performed (primarily though not exclusively) on an unusual electronic musical instrument, the theremin, which has a sound not unlike a low whistle or a human voice. The theremin part was played by Celia Sheen (1940–2011). From the 14th series onwards the soundtrack was altered so that during the closing titles a standardised version of the theme is played on a solo violin in place of the theremin. Occasionally a version with a longer introduction opens the show, using a flute rather than a theremin as the lead instrument.

The closing theme for "The Scarecrow Murders", shown on 29 May 2022 to celebrate 25 years, was a more jovial clarinet version.

Multiple soundtrack CDs have been released so far, containing versions of the theme and musical cues from various series.

== Home media ==
All 140 episodes have been released in the US (Region 1) and in the UK (Region 2) including three Christmas specials, by Acorn Media. The first 18 series and "Part 1" of series 19 of Midsomer Murders have been released in Australia and New Zealand (Region 4).

Note that episodes 1 to 100 were originally released as 25 DVD "sets", which were not in chronological order and are now discontinued. They have been re-released in 2015 as a chronological "series" 1 to 16 in redesigned packages. To confuse fans further, Costco Warehouses sold 5 abbreviated (region 1) sets with one less disc, but used the same "set" numberings even though they did not match the retail "sets".

Blu-ray discs were released for "Sets" 17 through 25 and "Series" 16 through 24, picking up where the "sets" left off but not re-issuing the "sets" in redesigned packages like the DVDs did.

In January 2006, Midsomer Murders started a DVD and Magazine Collection, available at newsagents in Australia, New Zealand, South Africa, and the UK.

Acorn Media had released DVD chronological order collections of Midsomer Murders in North America, which are:

- The Early Cases 10 disc collection of 18 episodes includes the pilot episode and those of series one, two, three, and four (except the last episode), as well as a bonus disc featuring a behind-the-scenes documentary.
- Acorn's "Barnaby's Casebook" 10-disc collection has 17 episodes, including the last episode of series four, followed by those of series five, six, and seven.
- Acorn's "Village Case Files" 8-disc collection includes the 16 episodes of series eight, and nine; and a 4-minute bonus clip from series one.
- Acorn's "Mayhem & Mystery" 15 disc collection includes the 17 episodes of series ten and eleven.
- Acorn's "Tom Barnaby's Last Cases" 15 disc collection includes the 17 episodes of series twelve and thirteen.

Below table are the release dates for complete series sets in both Australia Region 4 and the United Kingdom Region 2.

	Discs	Region 4	Region 2	Region 1
Complete series 1	3	18 August 2006	–	30 July 2013
Complete series 2	3	3 July 2007	–	30 July 2013
The Complete Series One and Two	6	–	6 April 2009	–
Complete series 3	2	3 July 2007	–	30 July 2013
Complete series 4	3	11 August 2008	–	30 July 2013
The Complete Series Three and Four	6	–	11 May 2009	
Complete series 5	3	11 August 2008	–	30 July 2013
Complete series 6	3	11 August 2008	–	30 July 2013
The Complete Series Five and Six	6	–	1 June 2009	
Complete series 7	4 (Region 4) 6 (Region 2)	3 November 2010	6 July 2009	30 July 2013
Complete series 8	4 (Region 4) 6 (Region 2)	3 November 2010	3 August 2009	30 July 2013
Complete series 9	4 (Region 4) 6 (Region 2)	3 November 2010	7 September 2009	30 July 2013
Complete series 10	5 (Region 4) 6 (Region 2)	4 February 2015	5 October 2009	30 July 2013
Complete series 11	5 (Region 4) 6 (Region 2)	4 February 2015	23 August 2010	30 July 2013
Complete series 12	6	4 February 2015	17 April 2011	30 July 2013
Complete series 13	5 (Region 4) 6 (Region 2)	4 February 2015	9 May 2011	30 July 2013
Complete series 14	4 (Region 4) 6 (Region 2)	9 March 2016	2 April 2012	30 July 2013
Complete series 15	4 (Region 4) 6 (Region 2)	9 March 2016	6 May 2013	30 July 2013
Complete series 16	4 (Region 4) 5 (Region 2)	22 March 2017	7 July 2014	16 Sep 2014
Complete series 17	3 (Region 4) 4 (Region 2)	22 March 2017	8 June 2015	15 Sep 2015
Complete series 18	4 (Region 4) 2 (Region 2)	4 October 2017	16 May 2016	20 Sep 2016
Complete series 19	4 (Region 4) 2 (Region 2)	15 August 2018	21 May 2018	pt.1 27 Jun 2017 pt.2 24 Oct 2017
Complete series 20	4 (Region 4) 2 (Region 2)	22 July 2020	2 December 2019	25 Sep 2018
Complete series 21	4 (Region 4) 2 (Region 2)	6 April 2022	5 April 2021	7 April 2020
The Complete series 1–4 (Limited Edition)	10	2 August 2017	–	
The Complete series 5–8 (Limited Edition)	14	2 August 2017	–	
The Complete series 9–12 (Limited Edition)	19	11 April 2018	–	
The Complete series 13–16 (Limited Edition)	16	11 April 2018	–	
The Complete series 17-20 (Limited Edition)	15	16 September 2020		
series 1–10	33	25 October 2017	–	
The Entire First 20 series (Limited Edition)	72	21 July 2021	–	

== Books ==
- Graham, Caroline (1987). The Killings at Badger's Drift. Adler & Adler. ISBN 978-0-917561-41-2.
- Graham, Caroline (1989). Death of a Hollow Man. Century. ISBN 978-0-7126-2911-9.
- Graham, Caroline (1993). Death in Disguise. Headline. ISBN 978-0-7472-0608-8.
- Graham, Caroline (1994). Written in Blood. Headline. ISBN 978-0-7472-4664-0.
- Graham, Caroline (1996). Faithful unto Death. Headline Publishing. ISBN 978-0-7472-1665-0.
- Graham, Caroline (1999). A Place of Safety. St. Martin's. ISBN 978-0-312-24419-4.
- Graham, Caroline (2004). A Ghost in the Machine. Headline. ISBN 978-0-7553-0772-2.
- Evans, Jeff (2003). Midsomer Murders: The Making of An English Crime Classic. Batsford. ISBN 978-0-7134-8768-8.
