= Jane Wymark =

British actress (born 1952)

- Born: 31 October 1952 (age 73); Paddington, London, England
- Education: University of Birmingham
- Occupation: Actress
- Years active: 1975–present
- Known for: Poldark; Midsomer Murders
- Spouse: Paul Howson
- Children: 2 sons
- Parent(s): Olwen and Patrick Wymark

Jane Wymark (born 31 October 1952) is an English actress. The daughter of English actor Patrick Wymark (1926–1970) and the American writer and playwright Olwen Wymark (1932–2013), she is best known for playing Morwenna Chynoweth Whitworth (Morwenna Carne by the close of the series) in the 1970s BBC television period drama Poldark (1977), and more recently as Joyce Barnaby (1997–2011) in the ITV detective series Midsomer Murders. She has appeared in television dramas such as The Bass Player and the Blonde, A Touch of Frost, Dangerfield, Lovejoy and Pie in the Sky. She also appeared as Jill Mason in the Birmingham Rep production of Equus. She is the great-granddaughter of novelist and short story writer W. W. Jacobs.
