= Daniel Casey =

British actor

- Born: 1 June 1972 (age 54); Stockton-on-Tees, County Durham, England
- Education: Durham University (BA)
- Years active: 1997–present
- Known for: Midsomer Murders (1997–2003, 2008); Our Friends in the North
- Spouse: Ellie Casey (m. 2005)
- Children: 2

Daniel Casey (born 1 June 1972) is an English actor. He is best known for playing DS Gavin Troy, the original sidekick of DCI Tom Barnaby, for the first six series (and the first episode of series 7), with a guest appearance in series eleven, of the long-running television programme Midsomer Murders.

== Early life ==
The son of journalist and television presenter Luke Casey, he grew up in Stockton-on-Tees and attended Grey College, Durham, graduating with a BA degree in English literature before pursuing a career in acting.

== Career ==
Casey began his acting career on stage, in a touring production of Dead Fish.

Casey is known for portraying DS Gavin Troy in Midsomer Murders, and Anthony Cox in Our Friends in the North. He also played leading firefighter Tony Barnes in the 2004 ITV firefighting series Steel River Blues. He also guest starred in M.I. High.

In 2010, he appeared in an episode of Inspector George Gently, and in 2011, he appeared in Marchlands. In 2012, and again in 2014, he appeared in Casualty. In early 2016, he appeared in Coronation Street.

Casey held a regular role in BBC soap opera EastEnders, playing Tom Bailey. He first appeared on 1 June 2017, and was originally credited as 'Nosebleed Man'. However, later on his character's name was announced, and he is now credited as Tom Bailey.

On 24 May 2018, he made his first appearance as Terry in Emmerdale.

On 28 January 2022, Casey began appearing as Professor Plum in the touring stage production of Cluedo.

In May 2025, it was reported that Casey would be returning to Midsomer Murders in the form of a stage production of The Killings at Badger's Drift and will be playing the role of Tom Barnaby.

== Personal life ==
He has two sons with his wife Ellie. They married in October 2005.
