= John Nettles =

English actor, author, and historian (born 1943)

John Nettles OBE
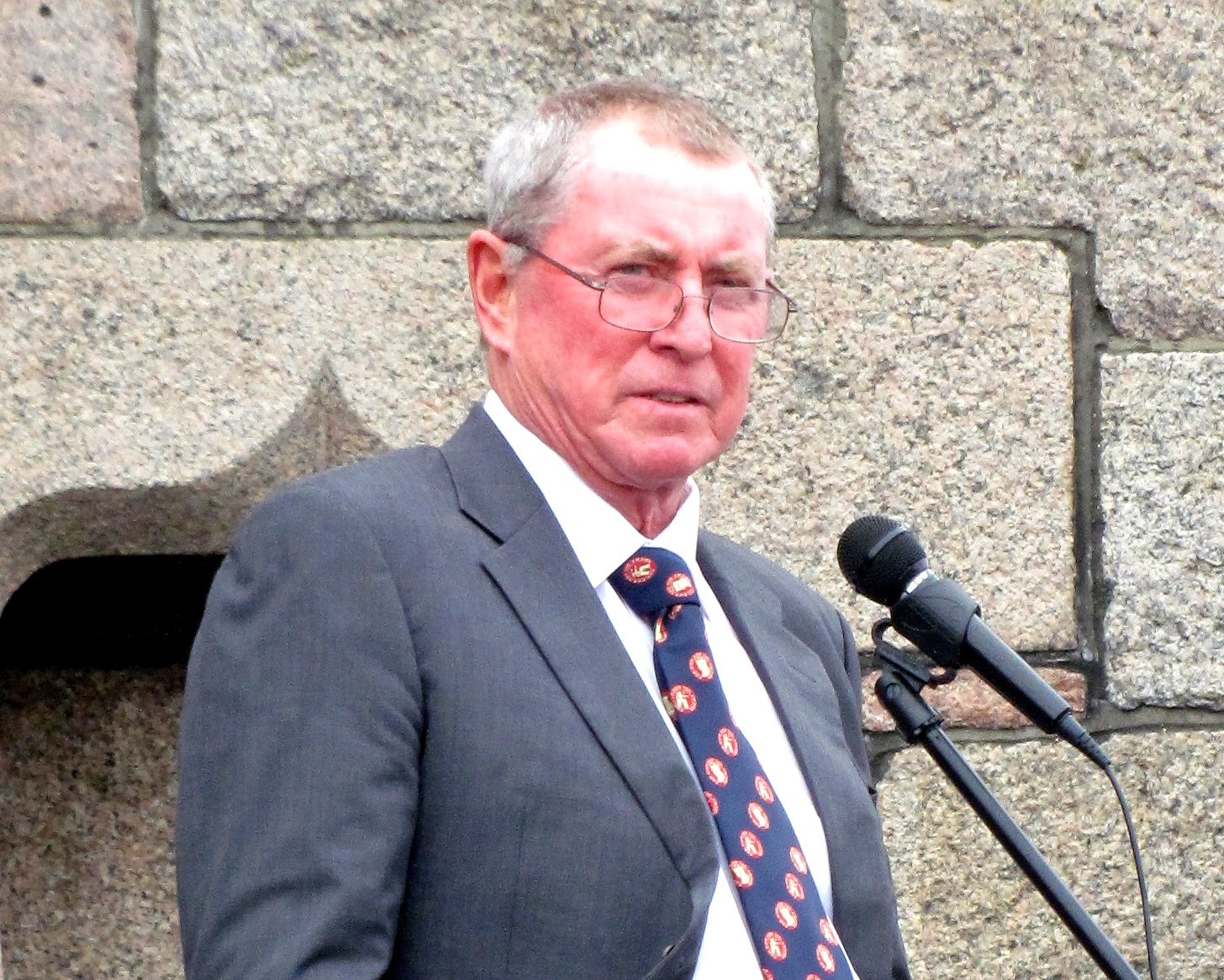
- Nettles in Jersey, 2013
- Born: John Vivian Drummond Nettles; 11 October 1943 (age 83); St Austell, Cornwall, England
- Education: University of Southampton
- Occupations: Actor; author
- Years active: 1969–present
- Television: A Family at War (1971–1972); The Liver Birds (1972–1976); Bergerac (1981–1991); Robin of Sherwood (1985); Midsomer Murders (1997–2011)
- Spouses: Joyce Middleton (m. 1966; div. 1979) Cathryn Sealey (m. 1995)
- Children: 1

John Vivian Drummond Nettles (born 11 October 1943) is an English actor, author, and historian. He is best known for his starring roles as detectives in the crime drama television series Bergerac (1981–1991) in the title role, and Midsomer Murders (1997–2011) as Detective Chief Inspector Tom Barnaby. He has also narrated several television series.

== Early life ==
Nettles was born in St Austell in 1943. His birth mother was an Irish nurse who came to work in Great Britain during the Second World War. He was adopted at birth by carpenter Eric Nettles and his wife Elsie.

As a youth, he attended St Austell Grammar School. In 1962 he went to study history and philosophy at the University of Southampton, where he developed an interest in acting, and after graduation he joined the Royal Court Theatre.

== Acting career ==
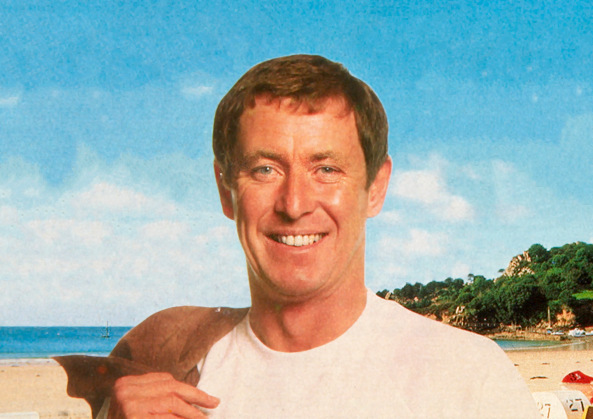
Jersey tourism advertising featuring John Nettles, 1980s

Nettles played Laertes to Tom Courtenay's Hamlet in 1969 at the University Theatre for 69 Theatre Company in Manchester. From 1969 to 1970, he was in repertory at the Northcott Theatre in Exeter, and in the latter year had his first screen role in the film One More Time. The following year, he played Dr. Ian Mackenzie in the period drama A Family at War, a role he continued until 1972. Following that, he had small parts in many TV programmes including The Liver Birds, Dickens of London, Robin of Sherwood and an episode of Enemy at the Door called "Officers of the Law", first broadcast in March 1978. The latter was set in Guernsey during the German occupation of the Channel Islands in the Second World War, and Nettles played a police detective ordered to work for the Germans, who is anguished over the conflict between his duty and collaborating with the enemy.

In 1981, Nettles became a household name in the UK when Robert Banks Stewart cast him as States of Jersey Police officer Jim Bergerac in the crime drama Bergerac. The series ran for 87 episodes on BBC1 until 1991. Following the end of Bergerac, Nettles did five seasons with the Royal Shakespeare Company, appearing in The Winter's Tale, The Merry Wives of Windsor, Julius Caesar, Richard III and The Devil Is an Ass. In 1992 he appeared in an episode of Boon, and in 1993 reprised the role of Jim Bergerac in a guest appearance in the spoof police comedy The Detectives.

In 1995, Nettles was approached by Brian True-May to play Tom Barnaby in a new murder mystery series he was to produce called Midsomer Murders. This was to be the second major role of his television career, again playing a police detective. Midsomer Murders was an immediate hit, achieving 13.5 million viewers on its launch in 1997 and was sold to more than 200 countries worldwide. In 2001 Nettles guest-starred in an episode of Heartbeat playing fraudster Giles Sutton. In 2003, he played Barnaby in the Boxing Day episode of French & Saunders. In 2007 he appeared in the BBC Radio 4 comedy series Will Smith Presents the Tao of Bergerac, alongside comedian Will Smith, which was about an obsessive fan of the series.

In February 2009, it was announced that Nettles had decided to leave Midsomer Murders after two further series were made. His final appearance on-screen was on 2 February 2011, by which time he had appeared in 81 episodes. About his departure, he commented, "It's always wise to leave people wanting more, rather than be booed off the stage because you bored them."

In 2016 and 2017, Nettles had a recurring role as Ray Penvenen in the second and third series of the historical drama Poldark.

He later retired from acting, although he would still provide voice work on television. He turned down the offer for a cameo appearance in the 2025 reboot of Bergerac.

== Other television work ==
In 1982, Nettles played Raoul (the 4th man) in The Agatha Christie Hour story The Fourth Man.

In the 1990s, Nettles narrated the BBC documentary X Cars following Greater Manchester Police's stolen car squad during the height of the UK-wide joyriding crime wave.

Nettles narrated Wild Discovery in 1995 and the BBC documentary series Airport from 1996 to 2005.

In early 2010, Nettles wrote, presented and produced a three-part documentary, Channel Islands at War, to mark the 70th anniversary of the German invasion and subsequent occupation of the Channel Islands. He received threatening letters from some residents of Jersey, accusing him of implying that islanders were collaborators. He defended the documentary saying: "There is no possible way you could have avoided collaboration with the occupying power who had power over the civilian population. If you had not toed the line you would have been shot." This view was supported by local historians and members of the Channel Islands Occupation Society.

In 2020, Nettles took over as the narrator on the Channel 4 television show Devon and Cornwall, a sister show to the network's The Yorkshire Dales and the Lakes programme.

== Books ==
During the filming of Bergerac, filmed on the island of Jersey, he wrote Bergerac's Jersey (BBC Books, 1988; ISBN 0-563-20703-5), a travel guide to filming locations in the series. He followed up with John Nettles' Jersey: A Personal View of the People and Places (BBC Books, 1992; ISBN 0-563-36318-5) about the island's landscape, personalities, and history.

In 1991, he wrote the semi-autobiographical Nudity in a Public Place: Confessions of a Mini Celebrity (Robson Books; ISBN 0-7451-1961-1) about becoming a "reluctant heartthrob" to female viewers of Bergerac. This was re-released as a Kindle version on Amazon in 2014, following the reruns of Bergerac on BBC2 as part of their afternoon nostalgia collection.

In 2012, Nettles wrote Jewels and Jackboots (Hardback ISBN 978-1-905095-38-4) about the German occupation of the Channel Islands. It sold out in a matter of weeks and was republished in 2013 as a paperback and on Kindle.

In 2019, Nettles published an edition of the diaries of Reverend Douglas Ord during the German occupation of Guernsey during World War II (Hardback ISBN 978-1-9993415-0-3). Nettles edited the diaries as well as writing an introduction.

== Personal life ==
Nettles married his first wife, Joyce Middleton, in 1967. Their daughter moved to Jersey with her father for Bergerac. She joined the States of Jersey Police, working with officers who met her father during the show's filming. After the Nettles' divorce in 1979, Middleton became a casting director for Midsomer Murders.

Nettles married his second wife, Cathryn Sealey, in July 1995 in Evesham, Worcestershire.

== Honours ==
Nettles was appointed Officer of the Order of the British Empire (OBE) in the 2010 Birthday Honours.

== Awards ==
In 1996, the University of Wolverhampton awarded Nettles an Honorary Master of Art.

In 2006, he was awarded an honorary doctorate from the University of Southampton, from which he had graduated.

On 21 September 2012, Nettles was awarded an honorary doctorate by the University of Plymouth. He also agreed to be a patron of Devon charity The Mare and Foal Sanctuary in July 2014.

== Filmography ==
Year	Title	Role	Notes
1969	The Expert	John Franklin	Episode: "Lie Down, You're Dead"
1970	One More Time	Dixon	
1970	ITV Sunday Night Drama	Methodist Number 1	TV series
1970	The Red, White and Black	10th Cavalry Trooper	
1971–1972	A Family at War	Ian McKenzie	14 episodes
1972–1976	The Liver Birds	Paul	19 episodes
1973	The Adventures of Black Beauty	Edwin Palgrave	1 episode; "The Debt"
1976	Dickens of London	Macrone	2 episodes
1977	Holding On	Herbert Goodings	3 episodes
1977	BBC2 Play of the Week	Theo Redman	1 episode; "Arnhem: The Story of an Escape"
1978	Enemy at the Door	Det. Sgt. Roy Lewis	Episode: "Officers of the Law"
1980	The Professionals	Fugitive	Uncredited
1980	The Merchant of Venice	Bassanio	Television film
1981–1991	Bergerac	Jim Bergerac	87 episodes
1981	BBC2 Playhouse	Gerald	Episode: "Findings on a Late Afternoon"
1982	The Agatha Christie Hour	Raoul Letardau	Episode: "The Fourth Man"
1984	Robin of Sherwood	Peter de Leon	Episode: "The Prophecy"
1991	Tonight at 8.30	Peter Gilpin	1 episode
1992	Boon	Joe Green	Episode: "Queen's Gambit"
1993	The Detectives	Jim Bergerac	Episode: "Studs"
1994	Romeo & Juliet	Capulet	Television film
1995	All Men Are Mortal	Sanier	
1996–2003	Airport	Narrator	82 episodes
1997	Millennium: Fact and Fiction	Narrator	
1997–2011	Midsomer Murders	DCI Tom Barnaby	81 episodes
1998	Fraud Squad	Narrator	
1998	The Tourist Trap	Narrator	1 episode
1998–1999	Disaster	Narrator	2 episodes
2000	The Unforgettable Les Dawson	Narrator	
2001	Heartbeat	Giles Sutton	Episode: "Still Water"
2002	The Hound of the Baskervilles	Dr. James Mortimer	Television film
2003	Sindy: The Fairy Princess	Ulebus the Wand / Shay the Unicorn / The King	Video only release
2003	French and Saunders	DCI Barnaby	Episode: "French and Saunders Actually"
2003	This is Your Life	Self	
2008	John Nettles Applauds	Presenter/Narrator	3 episodes
2010	The Channel Islands at War	Presenter	
2014	Toast of London	John Nettles	Episode: "Desperate Measures"
2016	Never Land	Fisherman John	Short film
2016–2017	Poldark	Ray Penvenen	9 episodes
2017	Walks with My Dog	Self	Episode: "John Nettles, Jon Culshaw & Helen Skelton"
2017	History	Presenter	Episode: "Hitler's England"
2020	Britain's Favourite Detective	DCI Barnaby	TV special
2020–2021	Devon and Cornwall	Narrator	16 episodes
2021–2022	My Unique B&B	Narrator	16 episodes
