= List of Midsomer Murders episodes =

List of episodes of the British TV drama series

Midsomer Murders is a British television detective drama that has aired on ITV since 1997. The show is based on Caroline Graham's Chief Inspector Barnaby book series, originally adapted by Anthony Horowitz.

From the pilot episode on 23 March 1997, until 2 February 2011, the lead character, DCI Tom Barnaby, was portrayed by John Nettles.

In February 2009, it was announced that Nettles had decided to leave Midsomer Murders after the conclusion of series 13 in July 2010. When his last episode, "Fit for Murder", aired on 2 February 2011, Nettles had appeared in 81 episodes.

Since 2011, the lead character has been DCI John Barnaby (Neil Dudgeon), who permanently joined the show following John Nettles' 2011 departure. He is the younger cousin of DCI Tom Barnaby. Like his cousin, John Barnaby works for Causton CID after moving from Brighton.

As of 30 December 2025, 138 episodes have aired on ITV over 24 series in the UK, while a total of 148 episodes have been released (e.g., via streaming in some countries) over 26 series. Air dates may vary from region to region. IMDb lists differing dates, but they may not be UK premiere dates, despite the series being of UK origin.

== Cast ==
Current cast
Character	Actor/Actress	Duration
DCI John Barnaby	Neil Dudgeon	Series 13–present
Sarah Barnaby	Fiona Dolman	Series 14–present
Betty Barnaby	Isabel Shaw	Series 20–present
DS Jamie Winter	Nick Hendrix	Series 19–present
Dr Fleur Perkins	Annette Badland	Series 20–present

Former cast
Character	Actor/Actress	Duration
DCI Tom Barnaby	John Nettles	Series 1–13
Joyce Barnaby	Jane Wymark	Series 1–13
Cully Barnaby	Laura Howard	Series 1–13
Dr George Bullard	Barry Jackson	Series 1–14
DS Gavin Troy	Daniel Casey	Series 1–7
DS Dan Scott	John Hopkins	Series 7–8
DS Ben Jones	Jason Hughes	Series 9–15
DC Gail Stephens	Kirsty Dillon	Series 10–13
Dr Kate Wilding	Tamzin Malleson	Series 14–17
DS Charlie Nelson	Gwilym Lee	Series 16–18
Betty Barnaby	Abbie and Georgia Mukleen	Series 16–19
Dr Kam Karimore	Manjinder Virk	Series 18–19

== Series overview ==
Series	Episodes	Originally released	
Series	Episodes	First released	Last released
Pilot		23 March 1997	
1	4	22 March 1998	6 May 1998
2	4	20 January 1999	19 September 1999
3	4	31 December 1999	5 February 2000
4	6	10 September 2000	23 September 2001
5	4	16 June 2002	22 September 2002
6	5	3 January 2003	31 January 2003
7	7	2 November 2003	25 December 2004
8	8	10 October 2004	2 October 2005
9	8	9 October 2005	17 September 2006
10	8	12 November 2006	11 May 2008
11	7	1 January 2008	5 May 2010
12	7	22 July 2009	14 April 2010
13	8	12 May 2010	2 February 2011
14	8	23 March 2011	11 January 2012
15	6	1 February 2012	30 January 2013
16	5	24 December 2013	12 February 2014
17	4	28 January 2015	18 February 2015
18	6	6 January 2016	17 February 2016
19	6	18 December 2016	20 May 2018
20	6	10 March 2019	14 January 2020
21	4	21 January 2020	28 March 2021
22	6	4 April 2021	27 August 2023
23	4	14 April 2024	10 November 2024
24	4	29 December 2025	29 December 2026
25	4	TBA	TBA
26	4	TBA	TBA

== Episodes ==
=== Pilot (1997) ===
No. overall	No. in series	Title	Directed by	Written by	Original release date	Filming Date
1	1	"The Killings at Badger's Drift"	Jeremy Silberston	Anthony Horowitz	23 March 1997	September–October 1996
The death of elderly Miss Emily Simpson (Renée Asherson) in the sleepy village of Badger's Drift brings DCI Tom Barnaby and DS Gavin Troy to investigate. Her best friend and neighbour, Lucy Bellringer (Rosalie Crutchley), had seen her return from a walk in the woods, unnerved and shocked by something she had seen. When her death is confirmed as no accident, Barnaby and Troy start to question the eccentric and quirky residents. Nosy village resident Iris Rainbird (Elizabeth Spriggs), who spies on her fellow villagers from a high vantage point in her house, may be a key witness, but she and her eccentric son Dennis (Richard Cant) soon fall victim to the killer themselves. Emily Mortimer, Julian Glover, Jonathan Firth and Christopher Villiers also appear.

=== Series 1 (1998) ===
No. overall	No. in series	Title	Directed by	Written by	Original release date	Filming Date
2	1	"Written in Blood"	Jeremy Silberston	Anthony Horowitz	22 March 1998	July–August 1997
Gerald Hadleigh (Robert Swann), chairman of the Midsomer Worthy Writers Circle, is deeply troubled when the group decides to invite writer Max Jennings (John Shrapnel) to their next meeting. The morning after Jennings's visit, Hadleigh's housekeeper finds him bludgeoned to death in his home. Barnaby and Troy discover Hadleigh was somewhat of an enigma since a witness observed an unknown woman enter his house the night before his murder. The police detectives now find themselves scrutinising all the writers and unearth many secrets before Max himself is found dead from poisoning. Anna Massey, Joanna David and Una Stubbs also appear.
3	2	"Death of a Hollow Man"	Jeremy Silberston	Caroline Graham	29 March 1998	October 1997
The peace of Ferne Basset is shattered when the body of quiet animal lover Agnes Gray (Denyse Alexander) is found floating in the nearby river. Soon afterwards her cousin, Esslyn Carmichael (Nicholas Le Prevost), inadvertently cuts his own throat on stage during the final act of an amateur production of Amadeus. It turns out that the safety tape on the prop razor used by Esslyn on stage had been removed, making it lethal. As most of the other cast members of the Causton Amateur Dramatics Society loathed him, there are multiple motives and suspects for his murder. DCI Tom Barnaby needs to establish whether there is a connection behind the two deaths to solve the case. Angela Pleasence and Bernard Hepton also appear.
4	3	"Faithful unto Death"	Baz Taylor	Douglas Watkinson	22 April 1998	November–December 1997
The villagers of Morton Fendle are up in arms when they find out that the local craft centre (a mill conversion), in which they had invested, is facing financial uncertainty. Barnaby learns that Simone (Lesley Vickerage), wife of the centre's owner Alan Hollingsworth (Roger Allam), is missing, and suspects that she has been kidnapped. Brenda Buckley (Sophie Stanton), Alan's admirer, follows Alan to Finchmere Market and sees him depositing a suitcase containing what appears to be a ransom payment. Shortly afterwards, Brenda is murdered when her car is forced off the road and into a collision with a stationary lorry. The deaths continue when Alan is also killed. Barnaby and Troy need to track down Simone and find the reasons behind the kidnap to solve the case. Tessa Peake-Jones, Paul Brooke, Michele Dotrice and Eleanor Summerfield also appear.
5	4	"Death in Disguise"	Baz Taylor	Douglas Watkinson	6 May 1998	August–September 1997
Bill Carter, a founder of a New Age commune called the 'Lodge of the Golden Windhorse', dies of a broken neck after falling down stairs of the group's country manor house. Barnaby and Troy investigate and meet the commune's quirky residents. They need to establish whether Bill's death was an accident or a premeditated murder. The investigation becomes more complex when Ian Craigie (Michael Feast), the co-founder leader of the commune, is stabbed to death with a carving knife during the spiritual ritual evening. The father of one of the commune members, a billionaire interested in buying the land, then dies of a sudden heart attack, leading both Barnaby and Troy to suspect that a further murder has taken place. A young member of the commune, who has never spoken since his arrival, may be the key witness in the case. Stephen Moyer and Judy Cornwell also appear.

=== Series 2 (1999) ===
No. overall	No. in series	Title	Directed by	Written by	Original release date	Filming Date	Viewers (millions)
6	1	"Death's Shadow"	Jeremy Silberston	Anthony Horowitz	20 January 1999	July–August 1998	10.41
The village of Badger's Drift is again at the centre of attention when popular local property developer, Richard Bayly (Dominic Jephcott), is found decapitated in his own home. Richard had recently been diagnosed with a malignant brain tumour, and had been contemplating his likely premature death. The murder weapon, an Indian sword, is found near his body, and it turns out it was stolen in a burglary at the vicarage. Barnaby and Troy set out to find out who would go that far to kill a dying man. The police detectives realise that the key to the case is the death of a young local schoolboy years in the past. The truth finally emerges, but not until two more deaths occur, first when a handyman burns alive in his caravan, and second when another parishioner is struck by an arrow at a village fete. Richard Briers, Judy Parfitt and Christopher Villiers also appear.
7	2	"Strangler's Wood"	Jeremy Silberston	Anthony Horowitz	3 February 1999	May–June 1998	10.70
Carla Constanza, a Brazilian actress and advertising face of Monarch Tobacco, is found strangled with a necktie in Raven's Wood. This murder is reminiscent of three similar murders that occurred nine years ago. A German backpacker, an au pair and a hotel maid had all been raped and strangled with neckties in the wood, which soon acquired the name "Strangler's Wood", among the press and local population. Barnaby and Troy must delve deeper into the dark secrets of Monarch Tobacco and become acquainted with the company's managing director, Bill Mitchell (Jeremy Clyde), and its marketing director, John Merrill (Nicholas Farrell). The police detectives solve the horrible case in the end, but not until another woman is found killed, run over by a car and later injected with a syringe containing liquid nicotine, and lastly when Leonard Pike (Peter Eyre), proprietor of the local hotel, is found stabbed to death in a bathtub. Toby Jones, Phyllis Logan, Trudie Styler and Frank Windsor also appear. First appearance of Dr Dan Peterson
8	3	"Dead Man's Eleven"	Jeremy Silberston	Anthony Horowitz	12 September 1999	May–June 1999	11.07
Tara Cavendish (Felicity Dean) is found beaten to death near a disused quarry belonging to her husband Robert Cavendish (Robert Hardy). Tara was seen leaving the house early in the morning, but when she failed to return from a walk with their dog, Robert starts to worry, and reports her missing. Barnaby and Troy start to investigate. Nine years ago, only weeks before Robert Cavendish decided to shut down his own quarry, an explosion occurred. Matthew Draper, an employee who works for Robert Cavendish, was killed in the accident. As further inquiries ensue, Barnaby and Troy are drawn to investigate the death eighteen months previously of Robert's former housekeeper, Emily Beavis. Emily's sister, Doreen Beavis, and witnesses Colin and Christine Cooper (Imelda Staunton) may hold the key to the case. Toby Jones also appears.
9	4	"Blood Will Out"	Moira Armstrong	Douglas Watkinson	19 September 1999	June–July 1998	9.99
Shortly after two groups of Travellers arrive in the village of Martyr Warren, local magistrate Hector Bridges is found murdered in his own study with his shotgun. Barnaby and Troy had earlier prevented him from forcefully evicting the Travellers with help from his army friends. They soon learn Hector was a bully, and disliked by many people who knew him. In particular his stepdaughter Fleur (Honeysuckle Weeks) had received brutal treatment at his hands. Fleur describes a stressful life to the two detectives. Barnaby realises that Fleur's biological father, Will Saxby (John Duttine), has a strong motive for wishing Bridges dead, then more tangled relationships are uncovered and secrets unravelled, before Barnaby and Troy can track down the culprit. Phyllida Law, Jerome Willis, Kevin McNally and Elizabeth Garvie also appear.

=== Series 3 (1999–2000) ===
No. overall	No. in series	Title	Directed by	Written by	Original release date	Filming Date	Viewers (millions)
10	1	"Death of a Stranger"	Peter Cregeen	Douglas Livingstone	31 December 1999	October 1999	5.87
Shortly before his retirement, Superintendent Pringle (James Bolam) arrests a local poacher for the murder of a tramp during a fox hunt in woodland close to the village of Upper Marshwood. But DCI Barnaby is unsure that the poacher was the real killer. Upon returning from holidaying in France, Barnaby is soon proved right when the poacher's father is found murdered with his own shotgun. As they reopen the investigation, they find many hidden secrets amongst the villagers. However, after he retires, Pringle is killed in an accident, which Barnaby suspects was also murder. Richard Johnson, Diane Fletcher, Simon McBurney and Toby Jones also appear.
11	2	"Blue Herrings"	Peter Smith	Hugh Whitemore	22 January 2000	June–July 1999	8.88
Alice Bly (Phyllis Calvert), the aunt of DCI Tom Barnaby, arrives at Lawnside, a nursing home in Aspern Tallow, to rest after her hospital treatment. She soon suspects foul play when a fellow resident dies on the night after her arrival. When it is discovered that the deceased lady's valuable Cartier watch has disappeared, during the night, Barnaby agrees to investigate. Two more deaths quickly follow at the nursing home, and a mysterious visitor has also been seen lurking in the vicinity at night. DCI Barnaby and DS Troy investigate the staff and the doctor alongside all the incidents at Lawnside. Nigel Davenport and Deborah Findlay also appear.
12	3	"Judgement Day"	Jeremy Silberston	Anthony Horowitz	29 January 2000	July–August 1999	9.65
As residents of Midsomer Mallow prepare for the 'Perfect English Village' competition, local thief and lothario Peter Drinkwater (Orlando Bloom) is stabbed with a pitchfork at the abandoned Windy Whistle Farm. Barnaby and Troy must consider a number of suspects, including his accomplice (Tobias Menzies), his burglary victims, or another disgruntled villager. As the competition unfolds on the village green, one of the judges is poisoned and killed, but it seems the unknown killer may have intended the poison for another victim. Barnaby and Troy must travel back in time to identify the killer. Timothy West and Nickolas Grace also appear. Last appearance of Dr Dan Peterson
13	4	"Beyond the Grave"	Moira Armstrong	Douglas Watkinson	5 February 2000	September–October 1998	9.40
A slashed portrait of local English Civil War figure Jonathan Lowrie in the museum at Aspern Tallow brings Barnaby and Troy to investigate. A series of ghostly events follow. Things take a more serious turn when the body of his elderly descendant Marcus Lowrie is found in the tomb of his ancestor, and the two detectives encounter a mysterious escaped criminal, a therapist (Sylvestra Le Touzel) who is never quite what she seems, and a museum trustee (James Laurenson) with a hidden past. As the bodies start piling up, the detectives must step back in time before things begin to make sense. Cheryl Campbell, David Robb and Prunella Scales also appear.

=== Series 4 (2000–2001) ===
No. overall	No. in series	Title	Directed by	Written by	Original release date	Filming Date	Viewers (millions)
14	1	"Garden of Death"	Peter Smith	Christopher Russell	10 September 2000	June–July 2000	7.65
The villagers of Midsomer Deverell are angered by the Inkpen family's plans to convert the public memorial garden into a tea shop. When Elspeth Inkpen's daughter Fliss is found murdered in the garden, Barnaby and Troy believe that someone may be determined to stop its destruction. Elspeth (Belinda Lang) moves to the vicarage where she, too, is murdered. As the investigation continues, the suspect list grows to include the daughter of the architect who designed the garden and a gardener (Neil Dudgeon) with whom both Elspeth and Fliss had been having an affair. Barnaby and Troy realise that the case will be solved only when the garden gives up a sinister secret.
15	2	"Destroying Angel"	David Tucker	David Hoskins	26 August 2001	July–August 2000	9.99
Upon his death, Karl Wainwright, owner of the Easterly Grange Hotel, leaves an estate with a number of beneficiaries, including hotel manager Gregory Chambers, his wife Suzanna (Samantha Bond) and hotel chef Tristan Goodfellow. One by one, they meet grisly deaths. Gregory is found dismembered in woodland where he had been foraging for mushrooms, Suzanna is killed with a shotgun and Tristan eats a meal of mushrooms that includes the deadly Destroying angel. Kenneth Gooders (Jonathan Coy), the solicitor handling the estate, is also killed when his large drinks cabinet topples over and crushes him. A cryptic new script for Gregory's former Punch and Judy show may provide Barnaby and Troy with some answers.
16	3	"The Electric Vendetta"	Peter Smith	Terry Hodgkinson	2 September 2001	August–September 2000	9.99
The naked body of a dead man is found in one of Midsomer Parva's wheat field crop circles. It is discovered that he was electrocuted, has puncture marks on his back, and that a piece of his hair is missing. As Barnaby and Troy investigate, more bodies turn up, including another in a crop circle. The detectives enter an alien world, dealing with the sightings of UFOs and where nothing is what it seems. John Woodvine, Ursula Howells and Alec McCowen also appear.
17	4	"Who Killed Cock Robin?"	David Tucker	Jeremy Paul	9 September 2001	September–October 2000	9.13
The village doctor (Ian McNeice) of Newton Magna involves the police after he accidentally hits a man in the road following a party. However, the injured man is nowhere to be found. The body of Robin Wooliscroft, who disappeared more than a year before, is then found in a well, having been bludgeoned to death. DCI Barnaby and DS Troy come across suspicions and all the lies, disapproving families, resentments and hidden secrets, before another victim (Jane Lapotaire) is found and they get to the truth.
18	5	"Dark Autumn"	Jeremy Silberston	Peter J. Hammond	16 September 2001	November–December 2000	9.77
In the remote hamlet of Goodman's Land, local postman and Lothario Dave Cutler is murdered during his early postal delivery. Barnaby and Troy, together with WPC Jay Nash (Gillian Kearney), start investigating and discover Dave had had numerous affairs with women in the village. A witness later recalls having heard strange 1950s dance music before the murder. When a local man's wife, an antique dealer and a publisher (Alan Howard) all become victims to the killer as well, the detectives need to find a possible link to connect the murders before Jay gets into a perilous situation herself. Celia Imrie also appears.
19	6	"Tainted Fruit"	Peter Smith	Peter J. Hammond	23 September 2001	May–June 2001	9.80
In the affluent village of Midsomer Malham, pariah Melissa Townsend (Lucy Punch) is found murdered by an injection of barbiturates. Miss Townsend had angered many, and received death threats after being blamed for the death of a local tenant. Both Barnaby and Troy soon discover that the same barbiturates had been stolen in a burglary at the local vet's (John McGlynn) surgery. With attempted blackmail, greed, jealousy and secrets in the mix, the detectives set out to catch the killer, not long after one man (Adrian Rawlins) dies in what appears to be a freak accident and another person is killed with barbiturates on a tennis court.

=== Series 5 (2002) ===
No. overall	No. in series	Title	Directed by	Written by	Original release date	Filming Date	Viewers (millions)
20	1	"Market for Murder"	Sarah Hellings	Andrew Payne	16 June 2002	August–September 2001	8.99
A car belonging to wealthy stockbroker Selwyn Proctor (Rupert Vansittart) is set ablaze and he narrowly escapes with his life. Meanwhile a local ladies' investment group meets under the guise of a reading club. Group leader Marjorie Empson (Barbara Leigh-Hunt) is found bludgeoned to death with her own walking stick in her house. The detectives quickly suspect that a stock market connection, possibly involving insider information, may link the two events. More killings follow, involving members of the group. Ginny Sharp (Serena Gordon) is found dead in her pool and Lady Chetwood (Angela Thorne) is pushed from the roof of her manor house. Barnaby and Troy begin to realise that the motives for the killings may not be as straightforward as they first supposed.
21	2	"A Worm in the Bud"	David Tucker	Michael Russell	23 June 2002	September–October 2001	9.52
When Susan Bartlett is found dead in Setwale Wood in Midsomer Worthy, DCI Barnaby and DS Troy discover the wood is the centre of a court case over a proposed redevelopment involving neighbouring farmers Simon Bartlett and James Harrington. Barnaby and Troy now suspect murder when two children tell them they found the body the previous afternoon. But as they investigate this case, they soon uncover a web full of witchcraft, potions and hidden secrets. When James Harrington is also found murdered, Barnaby and Troy realise, that they need to work fast to avoid further deaths.
22	3	"Ring Out Your Dead"	Sarah Hellings	Christopher Russell	15 September 2002	June–July 2001	9.43
The bell-ringers of Midsomer Wellow celebrate their win of £30,000 on a horse race and are hopeful of winning the annual striking competition. When a grudge from the past later starts to resurface, an unknown killer soon begins to target the bell-ringers, one by one. Greg Tutt is found shot through the heart in the belfry, the next victim is the bride (Lyndsey Marshal) at her wedding, and the third bell ringer is found drowned in a creek. Barnaby and Troy realise they need to step back in time to find the answer, following all the lines of a well-known poem left next to each victim. Hugh Bonneville, Gemma Jones and Adrian Scarborough also appear.
23	4	"Murder on St Malley's Day"	Peter Smith	Andrew Payne	22 September 2002	July–August 2001	9.37
Daniel Talbot, a student at Devington School, dies after being attacked and stabbed during the annual St. Malley's Day race. DCI Barnaby and DS Troy discover that Daniel was unhappy with his membership of the school's elite Pudding Club, founded by his grandfather, and had planned to run away from both the school and his family. An early suspect is the son of the local publican, but he is cleared of involvement when a further murder is committed while he is in custody. Dudley Carew, an eccentric conspiracy theorist in the nearby village, tells the detectives to focus their investigation on the school and the Pudding Club in particular. Barnaby and Troy are initially dismissive, but when he is also found murdered and a third victim, a diplomat wearing Pudding Club cufflinks, is also found, the detectives realise that Carew's advice will lead them to the answer.

=== Series 6 (2003) ===
No. overall	No. in series	Title	Directed by	Written by	Original release date	Filming Date	Viewers (millions)
24	1	"A Talent for Life"	Sarah Hellings	David Hoskins	3 January 2003	May–June 2002	9.23
Eccentric widow Isobel Hewitt (Honor Blackman) and an adulterous doctor, Duncan Goff, are found murdered while fly fishing at the riverbank. Keith Scholey, a local restaurateur, becomes a prime suspect but is discovered frozen to death in his walk-in freezer room. As Isobel had spent all her capital and nobody appears to benefit from her death, it seems there is no financial motive, but Barnaby realises all may not be as it first appears.
25	2	"Death and Dreams"	Peter Smith	Peter J. Hammond	10 January 2003	June–July 2002	9.46
Martin Wroath is found dead in his home in Midsomer Worthy. He had been shot with a shotgun using an elaborately rigged wire leading from his foot to the trigger. First appearances suggest suicide, but the autopsy reveals that he had been drugged. The police conclude he was murdered. The investigations lead to Dr Jane Moore (Isla Blair), an old friend of Tom's and a psychologist at a local mental health clinic who knew the victim. More deaths follow when one of Jane's colleagues is found hanging in the clinic grounds and the local marching band leader is strangled. Meanwhile a series of mysterious rope thefts occur around the village, and an attempt is made on Tom's life.
26	3	"Painted in Blood"	Sarah Hellings	Andrew Payne	17 January 2003	July–August 2002	9.45
Joyce joins the local watercolour society for an open-air art class on the village green in Midsomer Florey. Shortly before taking a break, she stumbles across the body of elderly Ruth Fairfax, a fellow artist. It turns out there was more to Ruth than met the eye. Barnaby is taken off the case by the National Intelligence Squad and it is left to Troy to 'apprehensively' keep Barnaby informed on the investigation. Barnaby and Troy soon uncover that the proceeds from an armed robbery are missing. They find out all information about former criminals alongside all the secret liaisons, before they bring all the culprits to justice.
27	4	"A Tale of Two Hamlets"	Peter Smith	Alan Plater	24 January 2003	September–October 2002	9.28
At the family home of actor Larry Smith in the village of Upper Warden, a crowd has gathered to watch the promotion for the sequel to his hit film, 'The House of Satan', when Larry walks into a summer house on the grounds that suddenly explodes. His family quickly suggest that it was someone from the rival village of Lower Warden. When Larry's director, another member of his family, is also murdered, electrocuted while using an exercise bike, DCI Barnaby and DS Troy deal with affairs and secrets, alongside blackmail, to find the reason why.
28	5	"Birds of Prey"	Jeremy Silberston	Michael Russell	31 January 2003	October–November 2002	9.32
In the village of Midsomer Magna, the body of the local resident Julian Shepherd is found, having apparently drowned himself by driving into a lake. It is discovered later that he was desperately seeking a way out of bankruptcy, after visiting a local millionaire, to get back his money from a scheme in which he had invested. The post-mortem confirms that he was indeed murdered. DS Troy assists a wildlife liaison officer with an investigation into the illegal sale of protected birds' eggs. Barnaby and Troy find their cases intertwining when another man who owned a collection of illegal birds' eggs is killed in a hit-and-run accident, and a historian is found stabbed to death by someone dressed as a witch doctor. They now deduce that the 'scheme' is being used to defraud its investors.

=== Series 7 (2003–2004) ===
No. overall	No. in series	Title	Directed by	Written by	Original release date	Filming Date	Viewers (millions)
29	1	"The Green Man"	Sarah Hellings	Michael Russell	2 November 2003	May–June 2003	10.01
Several skeletons are discovered in a tunnel during a canal restoration project near Midsomer Worthy. DCI Barnaby begins his investigations and discovers that one skeleton has modern dental work. Meanwhile, DS Troy has been promoted to Inspector. He begins his last case in Midsomer, investigating the murder of a teenager, Simon Mayfield (played by Henry Cavill), who had been shot with a gun that he and his friends had been using the previous night. The two detectives discover their cases are linked, and uncover a web of lies, affairs and domestic arguments alongside a mysterious recluse with a hidden past. Last regular appearance of DS Gavin Troy
30	2	"Bad Tidings"	Peter Smith	Peter J. Hammond	4 January 2004	June–July 2003	9.96
DS Dan Scott arrives in Midsomer as DS Troy's replacement. He is instantly involved in a case in the village of Midsomer Mallow, when a college secretary is found murdered. Soon after a retired doctor is also murdered during the village's annual garden open day. Barnaby and Scott investigate the connection between the two victims, and the murder of a homeless drunk give them the clue they need. Meanwhile, Cully organises a reunion with a group of old school friends, with unexpected results. First appearance of DS Dan Scott
31	3	"The Fisher King"	Richard Holthouse	Isabelle Grey	11 January 2004	July–August 2003	10.17
In 1970, Roger Heldman apparently died in an accident during an archaeological dig at the Midsomer Barrow. Two important Celtic pieces, a spear head and a chalice, were discovered but subsequently disappeared. In the present day, Roger's son Gareth is killed with the spear, after having had altercations with several of the villagers. Later, at the climax of the summer solstice celebration, Gareth's half-brother, David Heartley-Reade, is killed while performing a pagan ceremony to save his failing marriage. Barnaby and Scott investigate rituals, plagiarism, lies and a tangle of relationships.
32	4	"Sins of Commission"	Peter Smith	Elizabeth-Anne Wheal	18 January 2004	August–September 2003	9.71
Barnaby and Scott arrive in Midsomer St. Michael to investigate the apparently accidental death of former prize-winning author Richard Rackham. It transpires that his neck was expertly broken before he was pushed down the stairs. Meanwhile the village celebrates its 12th annual Literary festival, which brings together feuding writers, publishers, and editors. When Mr. Rackham's editor, Neville Williams and another author are found murdered, the police are led on a trail of deception, fraud, lies and hidden truths.
33	5	"The Maid in Splendour"	Richard Holthouse	Andrew Payne	25 January 2004	September–October 2003	10.24
The Maid in Splendour is a popular pub in the village of Midsomer Worthy. Its former publican Michael Bannerman, who is well-liked among the locals, has handed control of The Maid to his humourless son Stephen. When barman Jamie Cruickshank, and then Stephen Bannerman, are shot dead, Barnaby and Scott have to find out whether Jamie or Stephen was the intended target of the first murder.
34	6	"The Straw Woman"	Sarah Hellings	Jeff Dodds	29 February 2004	November–December 2003	10.03
An old pagan festival is revived in Midsomer Parva, with the burning effigy of a straw woman as its centrepiece. To the horror of the onlookers, the local curate, Alex Deakin, is found trapped within the effigy and burns to death. As the police investigate, a series of further deaths from apparent spontaneous human combustion follow. Barnaby and Scott soon suspect that someone is using the illusion of witchcraft to hide their true motives.
35	7	"Ghosts of Christmas Past"	Renny Rye	David Hoskins	25 December 2004	January–February 2004	6.90
Nine years after Ferdy Villiers committed suicide at the family home, Draycott Hall, his family gather at the Hall to celebrate Christmas. When Ferdy's nephew, Howard, finds a message in a Christmas cracker predicting that members of the family will be dead by midnight Boxing Day, everyone dismisses it a prank – until Aunt Lydia falls down the stairs and is fatally injured. Barnaby and Scott investigate, uncovering many secrets and lies connected to Ferdy's death, but are unable to prevent a further death.

=== Series 8 (2004–2005) ===
No. overall	No. in series	Title	Directed by	Written by	Original release date	Filming Date	Viewers (millions)
36	1	"Things That Go Bump in the Night"	Peter Smith	Peter J. Hammond	10 October 2004	May–June 2004	8.56
In the village of Fletcher's Cross, undertaker Patrick Pennyman is found dead in his own chapel of rest by his wife. Barnaby and Scott start looking into a controversial spiritualist church in the village. Villager Elizabeth Key tells her friend Joyce of her suspicions that the murdered undertaker had been stealing from the dead and that the spiritualist church had been using very non-spiritual methods to acquire information revealed in their services. When both Elizabeth and a local labourer are also killed, Barnaby and Scott uncover more secrets in Fletcher's Cross in their quest to find the perpetrator.
37	2	"Dead in the Water"	Renny Rye	Douglas Watkinson	17 October 2004	June–July 2004	9.13
At the Midsomer Regatta, the beautiful day is interrupted when the dead chairman of the local rowing club, Guy Sweetman, is found in the water. Barnaby and Scott learn that Guy, who had a reputation as a ladies' man, had participated in secret meetings with several other members. The two detectives uncover a tapestry of lies, blackmail and jealousy, and a very well planned robbery.
38	3	"Orchis Fatalis"	Peter Smith	Terry Hodgkinson	9 January 2005	July–August 2004	8.74
When a local handyman finds a female classics teacher and a member of a group of orchid enthusiasts poisoned in her own home, DCI Barnaby finds himself heading back to Midsomer Malham, the day after he and Joyce had helped out during the village's annual garden show. It is discovered that the victim had a secret lover and had helped to smuggle a rare orchid, the Yellow Roth, out of Borneo. With suspects and motives abounding, the police find themselves dealing with grudges, jealousies and envy. Where the orchid goes, murders follow.
39	4	"Bantling Boy"	Sarah Hellings	Steve Trafford	16 January 2005	August–September 2004	8.80
After a successful day at the races for the racehorse Bantling Boy, it is not long before one of the horse's owners is found murdered in the horses' stables. The victim, Bruce Hartley, had been in dispute with the other owners of Bantling Boy, having had a heated argument with them over an offer to buy the horse. Things get worse for the other owners when a series of further killings follow, before a darker motive is revealed and the detectives bring the culprit to justice.
40	5	"Second Sight"	Richard Holthouse	Tony Etchells	23 January 2005	October–November 2004	8.69
John Ransom gets thrown out of the village pub in Midsomer Mere for fighting with his brother-in-law, and a short while later he is found dead on the green. It is discovered that John had been used as a guinea pig for scientific experiments by his brother Max, who suspected he had the ability of 'Second Sight'. Barnaby and Scott soon discover that another family possesses the same talent. They have to delve deeper to unravel many secrets in the village to find the truth.
41	6	"Hidden Depths"	Sarah Hellings	David Hoskins	13 March 2005	November–December 2004	8.56
Solicitor Nick Turner apparently commits suicide by walking off the roof of his home in Midsomer Magna, and his neighbour Jack Wilmot mysteriously disappears that same day. A series of unexplained events follow. Barnaby and Scott soon discover that a large amount of money has gone missing from the account of one of Nick's clients. Shortly afterwards, Nick's rival is murdered in an elaborate ritual using his own model of a medieval catapult, while his wife is forced to watch. Then Barnaby and Scott fall into danger as they are locked into an apparently forgotten wine cellar.
42	7	"Sauce for the Goose"	Renny Rye	Andrew Payne	3 April 2005	January–February 2005	9.73
The body of a visitor is found in the famous relish factory of Plummer & Son in the village of Little Upton. When the detectives begin investigating the Plummer family and its staff, it turns out that the victim, Dexter Lockwood, was known to the family and had been on a guided tour of the factory the day before his body was found. It is not long before legal documents, family resentments, and mysterious sightings add to the complexity of the case.
43	8	"Midsomer Rhapsody"	Richard Holthouse	Richard Cameron	2 October 2005	February–March 2005	6.97
Retired music teacher Arthur Leggott is murdered after disturbing an intruder at his home in Badger's Drift. It is discovered that a musical manuscript by the late composer Joan Alder has since gone missing before being sent to auction. When the manuscript shows signs that it has been written by another hand, a handwritten letter by Joan Alder turns up indicating the manuscript is a forgery. Where the manuscript goes more murders follow. Last appearance of DS Dan Scott

=== Series 9 (2005–2006) ===
No. overall	No. in series	Title	Directed by	Written by	Original release date	Filming Date	Viewers (millions)
44	1	"The House in the Woods"	Peter Smith	Barry Simner	9 October 2005	May–June 2005	8.49
Peter and Caroline Cave are house-hunting in Midsomer Newton and view a tumbledown cottage in secluded woodland. The following morning they are both found dead in their car near the house. DCI Barnaby and Acting DC Ben Jones enter a world where crooked estate agents, property developers, and eccentric villagers all seem to be withholding information. It is not long before another villager is murdered. The detectives find out that a years-old armed robbery holds the key to the case. First appearance of Jason Hughes as PC Ben Jones, who later becomes a DC
45	2	"Dead Letters"	Renny Rye	Peter J. Hammond	26 February 2006	June–July 2005	8.54
The villagers of Midsomer Barton are celebrating the annual Oak Apple Week when the body of a woman is found in a stream. The return of the festival queen event, after a hiatus of eight years, seems to be a link to a series of murders. Barnaby and Jones investigate and find some familiar faces from the past.
46	3	"Vixen's Run"	Peter Smith	Michael Aitkens	5 March 2006	July–August 2005	8.94
The wealthy, eccentric, and obese Sir Freddy Butler dies shortly after gathering his current and former wives at a dinner to make an announcement. George Bullard tells Barnaby that the death was from natural causes. The case becomes more complex when Freddy's will goes missing after his solicitor is deliberately killed in an arson attack on his home. DCI Barnaby and DC Jones work their way through the extended Butler family and uncover hidden secrets, illegitimate children, and elusive treasure before they catch the killer.
47	4	"Down Among the Dead Men"	Renny Rye	Douglas Watkinson	12 March 2006	August–September 2005	8.07
In the village of Midsomer Worthy, council employee Martin Barrett entertains a mystery woman before being shot dead through his kitchen window. Barnaby and Jones discover that Barrett was an accomplished blackmailer and believe his murderer to be one of his many victims. The investigation takes Barnaby and Joyce to the seaside town of Fennacombe Bay. The detectives find themselves questioning a former marine geologist, a police committee chairman, a cleaner, and a fisherman. The murderer is hidden in plain sight, and it is a long time before Barnaby finally realises who the culprit is.
48	5	"Four Funerals and a Wedding"	Sarah Hellings	Elizabeth-Anne Wheal	12 June 2006 (Hungary); 24 September 2006 (UK)	September–October 2005	7.29
A 90-year-old feud between the male and female inhabitants of Broughton comes to a head with a Skimmington Ride event. When elderly Ms. Danvers is poisoned shortly before the event takes place, Barnaby and Jones must investigate whether her murder was related to the feud or another unknown cause. When the Rev. Anthony Gant is shot and killed while taking part in the traditional ride, and another murder follows, it seems likely that there are deeper secrets to uncover.
49	6	"Country Matters"	Richard Holthouse	Andrew Payne	19 June 2006 (Hungary); 10 September 2006 (UK)	November–December 2005	5.80
Villagers of Eleverton-cum-Latterly are divided over a controversial new supermarket development. Soon after a heated meeting, Frank Hopkirk, an independent environmental supervisor, is found stabbed to death at a timber yard on the site of the new supermarket. When Barnaby and Jones investigate, they find he was at the village for secret assignations with various female villagers in fantasy role-playing scenarios. At the same time, he had been making investigations of his own into the possibility the future supermarket's land was contaminated. The detectives need to delve deeply to uncover what is really going on in Elverton.
50	7	"Death in Chorus"	Sarah Hellings	David Lawrence	26 June 2006 (Hungary); 3 September 2006 (UK)	January–February 2006	6.28
Midsomer Worthy is preparing for the Four Choirs Competition when one of their members, Connor Simpson, is found dead at his home. Barnaby and Jones begin to look into the events leading to his death. The case is further complicated when a birdwatcher and estate keeper are also killed. With a mysterious figure seen lurking around the churchyard, conductor rivalry, and a possible art scam, there are many things to be investigated.
51	8	"Last Year's Model"	Richard Holthouse	David Hoskins	3 July 2006 (Hungary); 17 September 2006 (UK)	February–March 2006	6.78
Annie Woodrow is being tried for the murder of her friend Frances Trevelyan. The prosecution alleges that her motive was her love for Frances's husband John. As Annie's trial begins, DCI Barnaby becomes increasingly doubtful of the damning evidence he provided to build the case against her. A chance remark by Frances's youngest daughter and a meeting with an old friend, a clinical psychologist, causes him to re-evaluate the case. With DC Jones awaiting news of his promotion to Detective Sergeant, they find themselves reinvestigating and uncover new evidence that puts the case in a very different light. Ben Jones promoted to DS at the end of this episode

=== Series 10 (2006–2008) ===
No. overall	No. in series	Title	Directed by	Written by	Original release date	Filming Date	Viewers (millions)
52	1	"Dance with the Dead"	Peter Smith	Peter J. Hammond	12 November 2006	May–June 2006	7.80
Simon Bright is found dead in a vintage car at a disused airfield in Cooper's Cross. The previous evening, he had been on a romantic date with his girlfriend Laura Sharp, who is nowhere to be found. Barnaby and Jones, newly promoted to DS, need to work out whether it was a suicide pact gone wrong, or murder, and to find Laura. Their investigation reveals that the couple had met at Elaine Trim's dancing classes in Morton Fendle. The two attend a 1940s-style dance night at the village hall, before another man is found stabbed and more secrets come to light.
53	2	"The Animal Within"	Renny Rye	David Hoskins	19 January 2007	June–July 2006	6.95
Faith Alexander arrives in Midsomer to meet her long-lost uncle Rex Masters. She is shocked to discover that Rex's friends had been told she had died in a plane crash. Rex's body is soon afterwards found in the nearby river. Barnaby and Jones investigate who would wish Rex harm. Things become complicated when several friends of Rex come forward, each with a will naming them as sole beneficiary. When two more murders take place, the detectives investigate a range of suspects and possible motives.
54	3	"King's Crystal"	Peter Smith	Steve Trafford	26 January 2007	July–August 2006	6.88
On a business trip to China, Alan King suddenly dies. The family firm, King's Crystal, is in financial uncertainty, with plans to close its factory in Midsomer Magna. Six months later Alan's widow Hilary and his brother Charles are married, much to the chagrin of Alan's son Ian. With family feuds and factory workers angered by the loss of their jobs, motives abound when Peter Baxter, the firm's accountant, is found dead, stabbed with a Masonic poniard, and Ian is fatally poisoned. Barnaby and Jones suspect a disgruntled employee is guilty. With so many things to investigate, they will need to explore both the Freemasons and the family, and find that the play of Hamlet may hold the key to the case.
55	4	"The Axeman Cometh"	Renny Rye	Michael Aitkens	2 February 2007	August–September 2006	6.87
The Midsomer Rocks festival is due to take place and music fans descend on neighbouring fields to enjoy the fiesta. The recently reformed band Hired Gun is one of the headline acts, and during their opening performance, the band's vocalist Mimi Clifton is electrocuted on stage. Barnaby and Jones soon discover that other band members could be targets. When another is murdered, they discover that a former member, Ginger Foxton, who disappeared 30 years before and had been presumed dead, could still be alive. The detectives enter the world of rock music to find the killer. First appearance of Simon Dixon
56	5	"Death and Dust"	Sarah Hellings	Douglas Watkinson	8 May 2007	October–November 2006	6.18
When popular GP Dr Alan Delaney borrows fellow doctor James Kirkwood's new car for an evening call-out, he is mysteriously killed in a hit-and-run accident. Barnaby and Jones start investigating in Midsomer Market and discover that James may have been the intended victim. The case leads them to North Wales – the former home of Delyth Mostyn, James's fiancée, to delve further. The possible suspects for the attempted murder on Kirkwood include Delyth's children, who oppose the engagement, Delyth's husband, and other acquaintances of Doctor Kirkwood. They need to find the truth before another attempt on James's life during a walk at Mount Snowdon. First appearance of WPC Gail Stephens
57	6	"Picture of Innocence"	Richard Holthouse	Andrew Payne	3 June 2007	November–December 2006	7.31
There is a fierce rivalry between traditional and digital photographers in the village of Luxton Deeping. When the photographic society's committee decides not to accept digital images at the annual photographic exhibition, matters take an ugly turn and there is a confrontation. The following day, photographer Lionel Bell is found murdered in woodland, strangled with the cord of his light meter. As the detectives begin to investigate, evidence seems to implicate Barnaby in the murder and he is taken off the case. He is replaced by DI Martin Spellman, a colleague disliked by Tom, who appears more interested in his upcoming wedding than the case. When another photographer is murdered, Barnaby continues his investigation unofficially to discover who is framing him and bring the guilty party to justice.
58	7	"They Seek Him Here"	Sarah Hellings	Barry Purchese	21 August 2007 (Sweden); 27 April 2008 (UK)	January–February 2007	7.98
Inhabitants in the village of Midsomer Magna are in the spotlight when a film crew arrives at the village Manor House for a production of The Scarlet Pimpernel. Its presence coincides with the arrival of a well-known criminal, George Ince, who is spotted lurking around the Manor. When Nick Cheney, the film's director, is found dead by the use of the prop guillotine, the detectives have several motives to examine. The trail leads to an elaborate planned robbery before the truth emerges.
59	8	"Death in a Chocolate Box"	Richard Holthouse	Tony Etchells	28 August 2007 (Sweden); 11 May 2008 (UK)	February–March 2007	6.88
Ex-convict Ronnie Tyler departs from the village of Midsomer Holm, having successfully participated in a rehabilitation scheme for reformed criminals. At his send-off are DCI Tom Barnaby and Jack Colby, a disgraced ex-policeman and former colleague of Barnaby. Jack is decidedly frosty towards his former friend and refuses to chat. When Jack is later murdered, Barnaby must search for answers in his past for motives. Shortly afterwards another reformed criminal, Eddie Marston, is murdered after having attempting blackmail. Dark secrets resurface and Barnaby must deduce whether Colby's involvement in misconduct at Causton Police Station years earlier could be the key to the case.

=== Series 11 (2008–2010) ===
No. overall	No. in series	Title	Directed by	Written by	Original release date	Filming Date	Viewers (millions)
60	1	"Shot at Dawn"	Richard Holthouse	Michael Aitkens	1 January 2008	July–August 2007	6.62
When Private Tommy Hicks is executed during WWI for cowardice and desertion by a firing party commanded by Lt. Hammond, it ignites a 90-year feud between the Hicks and Hammond families. Fast forward to current era, a group of pranksters kidnap Lt. Hammond's son, retired army officer Henry Hammond. They re-enact the execution of Tommy in the village, following which Henry is murdered. The Hammonds accuse the Hicks family of the murder. A series of other incidents follow, including a remotely controlled bomb explosion where Lionel Hicks (son of Private Tommy Hicks) narrowly escapes with his life, and the murder of Henry's son Johnny who is gunned down by a remote controlled machine gun in front of his house. Barnaby and Jones delve deep into the history of both families to track down the killer.
61	2	"Blood Wedding"	Peter Smith	David Lawrence	10 May 2008 (Italy); 6 July 2008 (UK)	June–July 2007	7.20
As the preparations are underway for Cully Barnaby's wedding, Ned Fitzroy and Beth Porteous get married in Bledlow village. At the reception in Bledlow Hall, the maid of honour, Marina Fellowes, is found murdered. With the honeymoon postponed, the newlyweds and their guests find themselves under investigation by the police. Evidence soon points to a connection with archery when a fletching is found at the crime scene. Barnaby and Jones uncover a long family history with many secrets, lies, deception, and an illegitimate son. These things become even more complicated when the estate manager and former cook are also found murdered. Last appearance of Simon Dixon, and guest appearance of DI Gavin Troy
62	3	"Left for Dead"	Renny Rye	Michael Crompton	24 May 2008 (Italy); 13 July 2008 (UK)	August–September 2007	7.25
In the village of Dunstan, Barnaby and Jones investigate the deaths of a reclusive couple, Ron and Libby Wilson. Early on in the case, they learn that their son Michael, a classmate of Jones in primary school, had been killed in a hit-and-run and nearby, a fiery dispute is in full swing, between Jack Purdy, a builder who has a very short fuse and a group who are protesting his construction of a new road. With hostilities almost at breaking point, it is not long before both Jack and his brother Mark's wife are murdered, setting the village on edge. Barnaby and Jones need to find the link to unlock the motives behind the murders.
63	4	"Midsomer Life"	Peter Smith	David Hoskins	31 May 2008 (Italy); 20 July 2008 (UK)	October–November 2007	7.16
When the body of Charlie Finleyson is found in woodland in Midsomer Sonning, Barnaby and Jones begin to scrutinise the employees at the offices of Midsomer Life magazine. It is discovered that Mr. Finleyson was married to Christine Sandys, ex-wife of Guy Sandys, the wealthy owner of the magazine. The detectives also become aware of a dispute between Guy and the owner of the Morecroft Hotel, where Christine's brother works. Tensions rise between the locals and visitors from London. Shortly after being questioned, Guy is murdered in his office. Barnaby and Jones find out what led to the murder when Morecroft's alcoholic receptionist is killed in the laundry room and uncover the village's secrets from the past to catch the killer.
64	5	"The Magician's Nephew"	Richard Holthouse	Michael Russell	14 June 2008 (Italy); 27 July 2008 (UK)	November–December 2007	7.01
During a children's magic show, a performer assisting with a trick is poisoned while on stage. It is found that the poison came from a species of Ecuadorean frog. Barnaby and Jones discover that conflict is once again brewing between a village occult guide and enthusiast Ernest Baillol and famous writer Aloysius Wilmington, who are both searching for a treasured antique book on the subject. When others fall victim, they need to work out whether it was spellbinding, magical sorcery, something in times gone by, or a combination of them all to catch the killer.
65	6	"Days of Misrule"	Renny Rye	Elizabeth-Anne Wheal	5 July 2008 (Italy); 24 December 2008 (UK)	February–March 2008	5.89
New acting Chief Superintendent John Cotton plans a team-building exercise at a Territorial Army centre run by Colonel Matt Parkes. Barnaby and Jones are very reluctant to take part and when an explosion at the Parkes family haulage yard occurs, the detectives see the investigation as an opportunity to avoid the team building event. Shortly after, a body is discovered in a trunk that resurfaces from the nearby lake. The victim is identified as Alec Grainger, who had been arguing with Colonel Parkes' son Jamie. When Jamie is also found murdered, the detectives are faced with an abundance of suspects and motives, as Jamie seemed to have been universally hated.
66	7	"Talking to the Dead"	Sarah Hellings	David Lawrence	5 August 2008 (Sweden); 5 May 2010 (UK)	March–April 2008	5.92
In the village of Monks Barton, two couples seemingly disappear from their cottages. When Barnaby and Jones arrive, they learn about the legendary and mysterious haunted woods. Shortly afterwards, a body is found in a shallow grave, giving Barnaby and Jones an accurate description of one of the "missing" persons. The detectives have to delve much deeper into the woods and beyond to find the answer. Note: This episode was delayed until 2010: it finally aired on ITV one week before the episode, "The Made-to-Measure Murders" (Series 13, Episode 2).

=== Series 12 (2009–2010) ===
No. overall	No. in series	Title	Directed by	Written by	Original release date	Filming Date	Viewers (millions)
67	1	"The Dogleg Murders"	Richard Holthouse	Andrew Payne	19 March 2009 (Italy); 22 July 2009 (UK)	June–July 2008	6.14
The notorious 13th hole at the prestigious Whiteoaks Golf Club, known as Crisp's Folly, becomes the scene of a brutal murder when member Alistair Kingslake is found bludgeoned to death. The many suspects include fellow members and the club's staff against a background of snobbery, gambling, illegal money lending, jealousy and extortion. Before long, another member is found stabbed to death in woodland close to the course. It is a golfing clue that finally leads Barnaby and Jones to the killer.
68	2	"The Black Book"	Peter Smith	Nicholas Martin	26 March 2009 (Italy); 29 July 2009 (UK)	July–August 2008	6.90
A newly discovered landscape painting by the 19th-century artist Henry Hogson creates a sensation in the art world when it is discovered, and is sold at auction for £400,000. That night, Felicity Law, the previous owner of the artwork, is tortured and killed. When another Hogson is stolen in a burglary Barnaby finds himself having to investigate both crimes. Meanwhile, Graham Spate, a small-time villain, is also tortured to death, and an art dealer is found with his throat slashed. To solve these crimes, Barnaby needs to become an expert on Hogson with the help of art teacher Matilda Simms, and they uncover many hidden secrets and deceptions before the truth emerges.
69	3	"Secrets and Spies"	Renny Rye	Michael Aitkens	7 July 2009 (Sweden); 5 August 2009 (UK)	August–September 2008	6.28
The 'Beast of Midsomer' is blamed when former secret agent Geoffrey Larkin is found murdered in the village of Midsomer Parva with savage wounds to his face. He had been staying at Allenby House, a country manor run by former spies, the Frazer family, as a safe house. Barnaby, who is himself revealed as a former spy, becomes involved in the case. With a break-in at the local museum, a cricket match, rivalries, and secret loves, other murders take place and Barnaby soon suspects the killing of Larkin has links to events in Berlin during the Cold War. After resistance to his involvement from MI6 he finally succeeds in closing the case and bringing the guilty party to justice. Gail Stephens becomes a DC in this episode
70	4	"The Glitch"	Richard Holthouse	Michael Russell	21 July 2009 (Sweden); 23 September 2009 (UK)	October–November 2008	6.34
George Jeffers is a professor of Midsomer University and cycling enthusiast. He has invented a state-of-the-art use of computer wafers to enable more powerful computer processing. But Jeffers believes he has found a glitch in his invention which will put millions of people at risk if his discovery is improperly used. This angers software boss Clinton Finn, who fears he will lose millions if the truth is exposed. A series of incidents involving car attacks, break-ins and deaths follow, and Barnaby, Jones and Stephens find they need their cycling skills as much as their detective skills before the case can be closed.
71	5	"Small Mercies"	Peter Smith	Peter J. Hammond	20 September 2009 (AUS); 28 October 2009 (UK)	November–December 2008	6.43
It is the end of the tourist season for the Little Worthy model village, owned by the elderly Compton sisters. Model maker Bob Moss is carrying out his daily early morning rounds of the village when he discovers the body of Richard Tanner, stabbed and tied down in a scene reminiscent of Gulliver's Travels. As Barnaby and Jones start questioning the villagers, more deaths follow before they finally identify the family connections that lead them to a very disturbed killer.
72	6	"The Creeper"	Renny Rye	Andrew Payne	27 September 2009 (AUS); 27 January 2010 (UK)	February–March 2009	6.35
The 'Creeper' is a daring cat burglar responsible for a series of daring thefts across Midsomer. After the Creeper strikes twice in one night, a writer, David Roper, is found smothered to death in his bed on the Chettham family estate. The police soon learn that Mr. Roper had been planning to write a book that could have exposed many Chettham family secrets of years past. The mystery deepens when a second victim who knew the family is shot in woodland. The detectives have to search the family's history to solve the crimes and finally uncover the Creeper's identity.
73	7	"The Great and the Good"	Richard Holthouse	David Hoskins	4 October 2009 (AUS); 14 April 2010 (UK)	March–April 2009	5.46
Connie Bishop, a school teacher who is known to sleepwalk, begins to experience disturbing dreams and is convinced of an intruder in her home. She becomes a murder suspect when a local councillor and, soon after, a local handyman are found with their throats cut near to her house. Her friends are not convinced of her guilt and nor is Barnaby. As the investigation continues, local philanthropist Howard Richardson and his social-climbing wife Zukie irritate the community when they introduce their own plans for the annual village charity occasion. Events come to a dramatic conclusion when Barnaby and Jones unexpectedly interrupt the charity evening to arrest the killer.

=== Series 13 (2010–2011) ===
Note: the blood-red drips behind the letters of the title, present since the beginning of the series, have been changed to multi-colour.

No. overall	No. in series	Title	Directed by	Written by	Original release date	Filming Date	Viewers (millions)
74	1	"The Sword of Guillaume"	Renny Rye	Michael Aitkens	10 February 2010	July–August 2009	7.02
The Midsomer county town has historic connections with the city of Brighton. During a council meeting, Causton Mayor Dave Hicks announces plans for a Chamber of Commerce reunion with its counterpart in Brighton. Barnaby suspects the mayor's proposal to buy coastal land there is fraudulent and reluctantly joins the party. But during their time in Brighton, hated property developer Hugh Dalgleish is beheaded on a ghost train ride. DCI Tom Barnaby teams up with his cousin, DCI John Barnaby of Brighton Police, to investigate who is responsible before other murders take place. First appearance of John Barnaby
75	2	"The Made-to-Measure Murders"	Peter Smith	Andrew Payne	12 May 2010	June–July 2009	5.53
The Milton Estate is the principal landowner for much of Milton Cross, with many people and businesses dependent on Edward Milton for their jobs and income. One of those businesses is the Woodley & Woodley tailor shop. When Sonia Woodley is found murdered in the churchyard two years after the death of her abusive husband Gerald, a set of tailor's shears are identified as the murder weapon. Barnaby and Jones discover that Sonia had passed a letter to the vicar a few days before, but the handwriting is not hers. When the vicar is also murdered shortly afterwards, the police need to uncover who wrote the letter to solve the mystery.
76	3	"Blood on the Saddle"	Richard Holthouse	David Lawrence	27 July 2010 (Sweden); 8 September 2010 (UK)	September–October 2009	6.07
The Wild West Society bring their show to Ford Florey, comprising a fairground, and several re-enactments of scenes from American frontier history. Amidst the sound of gunfire, the witch on the 'Dunk the Witch' stall is shot dead. Barnaby and Jones look at possible motives, which seem to revolve around the disputed ownership of an area of local land. The investigation encounters family rivalries and a recurring Wild West theme before the killer can be caught.
77	4	"The Silent Land"	Peter Smith	Peter J. Hammond	3 August 2010 (Sweden); 22 September 2010 (UK)	October–November 2009	5.45
On a dark night in the village of March Magna, Joyce Barnaby swerves her car, narrowly missing a shadowy figure in the road. Shortly after, a body is found in the local cemetery. The victim, Gerald Ebbs, was the Parish Council clerk with responsibility for the village library and cemetery. The police discover that Gerald had had a strange fixation on both an abandoned hospital and a particular grave in the cemetery. He seemed to have made enemies around the village, so the police do not lack suspects. As Barnaby and Jones delve deeper into his background, a second murder during a night time tour of the hospital points them to the killer.
78	5	"Master Class"	Renny Rye	Nicholas Martin	6 October 2010	March–April 2010	6.10
Devington Manor Winter School, led by internationally renowned musician Sir Michael Fielding, is a magnet for many aspiring piano students, including gifted Zoe Stock. While walking by the riverbank in the manor grounds, Zoe sees a woman jump from the bridge and disappear in the water. When Barnaby and Jones start their enquiries into the possible drowning, they discover many dark connections to the past. As secrets begin to emerge, Barnaby himself is the target of a murder attempt. Two murders follow: one of Zoe's fellow students and the local priest. The detectives need to investigate the school, students and their parents, to uncover a shocking conspiracy linked to Zoe's past.
79	6	"The Noble Art"	Richard Holthouse	Barry Purchese	13 October 2010	April–May 2010	5.70
When famous boxer John Kinsella wins a world title in New York, the villagers of Midsomer Morchard are overjoyed at his success. Shortly afterwards a solicitor is found dead by his assistant and Kinsella's manager. Barnaby and Jones investigate against the background of a Victorian prize-fight re-enactment in which Kinsella and the local blacksmith portray the boxers. As the event becomes unexpectedly realistic, Kinsella's manager is found murdered in his home gymnasium. Barnaby finds the solution only after realising that his judgement has been clouded in this investigation.
80	7	"Not in My Back Yard"	Peter Smith	J.C. Wilsher	12 January 2011	May–June 2010	6.93
The Midsomer Conservation Society is up in arms when the newly built Swanscombe House is a highlight of an open garden day. An ugly confrontation ensues when some of its members make angry accusations of corruption against those responsible for the design, construction and planning approval for the house. When a leading member of the Conservation Society is stabbed to death, and evidence of an alleged conspiracy to subvert a new planning application disappears, Barnaby and Jones suspect a link between the murder and the conspiracy. One by one, those connected to the corrupt scheme are killed. The architect's neck is crushed by a sliding door and the builder is sedated and smothered in concrete, which suffocates him. Barnaby realises that the unknown killer is methodically covering their tracks.
81	8	"Fit for Murder"	Renny Rye	Andrew Payne	23 January 2011 (Sweden); 2 February 2011 (UK)	June–July 2010	8.10
A quiet spa weekend at Swavely Manor proves far from relaxing when Tom and Joyce arrive and a female client is found murdered in the flotation chamber. Barnaby interrupts his spa treatment to investigate with Jones. The mystery deepens when the victim's husband disappears. As Tom worries about his future and health, one of the hotel proprietors is also murdered. When the case is finally solved, Barnaby announces his impending retirement. His successor is announced to be his cousin, John Barnaby, who is a newly appointed DCI at Causton CID. Last appearances of Tom Barnaby, Joyce Barnaby, Cully Barnaby and DC Gail Stephens

=== Series 14 (2011–2012) ===
No. overall	No. in series	Title	Directed by	Written by	Original release date	Filming Date	Viewers (millions)
82	1	"Death in the Slow Lane"	Richard Holthouse	Michael Aitkens	23 March 2011	July–August 2010	6.44
New Causton DCI John Barnaby arrives in Midsomer county. Years earlier, the body of a renowned racing car driver had been found at the prestigious Darnley Park Girls School, apparently having committed suicide with a revolver. The school is now hosting a vintage car rally, but the event is disrupted by the death of one of the judges, a local celebrity DJ. Initially, his death is also presumed to be suicide, but Barnaby soon spots evidence suggesting that both victims had been murdered. First appearance of Sykes the dog
83	2	"Dark Secrets"	Simon Langton	Michael Aitkens	30 March 2011	August–September 2010	6.32
The lives of elderly eccentrics William and Mary Bingham come under police investigation when a social services inspector is found dead in the river, apparently from a canoeing accident. Barnaby is suspicious and quickly concludes the death was murder. He and Jones investigate a local artist community and the significance of the death of the Binghams' son and daughter, many years previously. The collapse of a tower of newspapers brings a further death. A printed image of the lunar surface provides the clue that enables the detectives to identify the killer. First appearance of Sarah Barnaby
84	3	"Echoes of the Dead"	Nick Laughland	Peter J. Hammond	20 April 2011	September–October 2010	5.47
Jo Starling arrives at her cottage in Great Worthy to find her housemate, Dianne Price, dead in the bath. The message "Blessed Be the Bride" is written on the mirror above her body in red lipstick. There follows a series of bizarre murders with similar wedding-themed messages also written in red lipstick. Barnaby and Jones believe that the killer is a local, and have a number of suspects to investigate, including a voyeuristic landlord, a retired policeman and his former brothel madame wife, and the proprietors of a donkey sanctuary. As the investigation proceeds, it becomes clear that the killer is a very disturbed individual who has been triggered to commit murder by a momentous personal event.
85	4	"The Oblong Murders"	Renny Rye	David Hoskins	25 May 2011	October–November 2010	5.33
Lucy Oliver, daughter to friends of George Bullard, disappears from a manor house being used by the Oblong Foundation, a New Age cult organisation. Bullard asks for Barnaby's help in finding out what happened to her. The Oblong Foundation is renting the manor house from Ruth Lambert, who inherited the house from her parents after they were killed in a boat explosion. DS Jones, who has recently returned from an undercover policing course, joins a group of Foundation inductees under an assumed identity. He becomes increasingly uncomfortable when one of the female inductees, along with Ruth herself, seem to be emotionally drawn to him. Meanwhile, Barnaby looks into the death of Ruth's parents, suspecting murder, and believing the events all to be linked. These suspicions seem to be confirmed when one of the Foundation leaders is found stabbed. When the case is finally solved, George Bullard announces his retirement. Last appearance of Dr George Bullard
86	5	"The Sleeper Under the Hill"	Nick Laughland	David Lawrence	21 September 2011	March–April 2011	5.83
Farmer Alex Preston's dead body is found in the centre of the ancient Crowcall stone circle days before the spring equinox. Early evidence points to a community of New Dawn Druids, who had been angered over Preston's plans to plough the meadow and make the sacred place inaccessible. But when one of the druids is also murdered, Barnaby realises that more complex motives are involved, and his suspicions turn in a direction that threatens to create a serious rift between him and Jones. Maps that reveal the location of a hidden Anglo Saxon treasure, along with a more modern valuable painting, provide the clues that lead to a very manipulative killer. First appearance of Dr Kate Wilding
87	6	"The Night of the Stag"	Simon Langton	Nicholas Martin	12 October 2011	April–May 2011	6.04
Barnaby and Jones attend the Midsomer Abbas spring fair, a celebration of the village's friendship with Midsomer Herne. After sampling the local cider, Barnaby becomes unwell, and moments later the body of Peter Slim is discovered inside the cider vat. Peter had been a tax inspector searching for illicit alcohol. The investigation reveals two very insular communities wedded to ancient traditions and suspicious of outsiders. When the bloodied fingerprints of the local cider mill owner are found on a wooden staff linked to the murder, the case seems solved. But Barnaby has his doubts. Meanwhile, the local vicar, the Reverend Conrad Walker, is appalled at plans to revive an ancient fertility rite known as 'The Stag,' and soon afterwards is himself murdered. Upon discovering that a local girl had been married to Peter Slim, the detectives realise that the motive for the killings is far darker than they had imagined.
88	7	"A Sacred Trust"	Renny Rye	Rachel Cuperman and Sally Griffiths	26 October 2011	June–July 2011	6.38
Barnaby and Jones enter the cloistered world of Midsomer Priory to investigate the death of Mother Thomas Aquinas. Earlier, an ancient stained glass window at the priory had been vandalised, leading the nuns to discuss selling their valuable collection of antique silver to finance its repair. After the murder, it is discovered that the silver has disappeared. The detectives unearth some surprises when the ownership of the priory is investigated; but the real trail leads back to a chilling event that occurred 30 years previously. Barnaby and Jones realise the killer's identity, but finding hard evidence proves difficult until one of the nuns puts her safety at risk.
89	8	"A Rare Bird"	Nick Laughland	Steve Trafford	11 January 2012	July–August 2011	6.43
Retired financier and bird enthusiast Patrick Morgan is found bludgeoned to death in woodland. There is a wide list of suspects, including farmer George Napier, who has fallen out with Peter over his plans to drain adjacent land, and members of the Midsomer-in-the-Marsh ornithological group, whose members have had a heated argument over an alleged sighting of a rare African bird. Matters become more complicated when it emerges that Peter's wife Nina, a former lead ballerina with the Russian Kirov Ballet, is pregnant and it seems that he cannot be the father. A further murder occurs before photographs and sound recordings lead the detectives to a very obsessed killer.

=== Series 15 (2012–2013) ===
Note: the blood-red drips behind the letters of the title have returned, after having been changed to multi-colour for two seasons.

No. overall	No. in series	Title	Directed by	Written by	Original release date	Filming Date	Viewers (millions)
90	1	"The Dark Rider"	Alex Pillai	Michael Aitkens	1 February 2012	September–October 2011	6.94
Legend has it that the headless apparition of Sir Geoffrey DeQuetteville, riding a grey horse, spells imminent death to any member of the DeQuetteville family who sees it. The legend seems to come true when several members of the present day family are killed after sighting the horseman. Meanwhile, a re-enactment of the Battle of Naseby reignites a long running feud between the DeQuettevilles and the neighbouring Fleetwood family, who were in opposing sides in the battle. Barnaby and Jones suspect that the killer is operating with an accomplice, as it seems impossible for a single person to be involved. Barnaby instructs Jones to track down the grey horse, as this is likely to be the key to solving the case.
91	2	"Murder of Innocence"	Renny Rye	Elizabeth-Anne Wheal	21 March 2012	November–December 2011	5.60
When Grady Felton was convicted for the murder of Daniel Denning, he protested his innocence and left a 'death list' of people he blames for his conviction, including then Constable Ben Jones. Years later, after serving his sentence, he is released from prison and returns to Binwell Village, where he grew up and the murder took place. One by one, the people on the death list are murdered. Grady seems to have a solid alibi for the killings, and when he is himself targeted in an arson attack, Barnaby and Jones realise the case is more complex than first appears.
92	3	"Written in the Stars"	Renny Rye	Steve Trafford	24 September 2012	May–June 2012	5.05
After gathering on Moonstone Ridge to observe a total eclipse of the sun, members of the amateur Midsomer Stanton Astronomical Society start to meet their deaths in bizarre ways. Three amateur astronomers are killed – the first, by a blow to the head with a meteorite, the second with a spear, and the third nearly decapitated using a bronze disc with astronomical markings. The astrological sign Scorpio seems to be a common theme of the killings, but Barnaby begins to doubt whether the case is so straightforward.
93	4	"Death and the Divas"	Nick Laughland	Rachel Cuperman and Sally Griffiths	2 January 2013	April–May 2012	6.49
When Eve Lomax, a film journalist writing a book about 1960s horror actress Stella Harris, is found dead in Midsomer Langley, it appears her neck was punctured by a vampire. Shortly afterward, Stella's more famous sister Diana Davenport returns to the village after a 40-year-old family rift. The series of killings continues, each depicting deaths similar to those in Stella's films. Barnaby and Jones finally discover who is behind the crimes. Note: This episode has atypical title, being solid blood-red letters on a scenic background, ala movie titles.
94	5	"The Sicilian Defence"	Alex Pillai	Paul Logue	9 January 2013	June–July 2012	6.95
Harriet Farmer wakes up after being in a coma for almost a year. Shortly after running away to elope with her boyfriend, Finn Robson, Harriet had been left for dead in local woodland. Barnaby and Jones look into whether the attack could be connected to rivalry in a chess club, whose members are very competitive. Before long, Harriet starts remembering that night, leading to her possibly revealing who attacked her and the whereabouts of her boyfriend Finn. The detectives need to solve chess notation to identify the culprit.
95	6	"Schooled in Murder"	Andy Hay	Lisa Holdsworth	30 January 2013	July–August 2012	6.89
Midsomer Pastures is on the map owing to its famous connection with producing the Midsomer Blue cheese. When Debbie Moffett is lured to the caves and is subsequently bludgeoned by a wheel of cheese, it leads the detectives to investigate both the secret, controversial plans to modernise the dairy and the private lives of the parents of children at the local preparatory school in the same village. During the family dinner, Poppy Ordish, daughter of Beatrix Ordish and Oliver Ordish, refuses to eat beef. When more people are killed, long-held secrets about the dairy, school, and villagers are revealed and play a key role in catching the killer. In the end, John, Sarah, Sykes the dog, Ben, and Kate celebrate the Barnabys' 15th anniversary. Last regular appearance of DS Ben Jones

=== Series 16 (2013–2014) ===
No. overall	No. in series	Title	Directed by	Written by	Original release date	Filming Date	Viewers (millions)
96	1	"The Christmas Haunting"	Nick Laughland	Chris Murray	24 December 2013	June–July 2013	4.92
DCI Barnaby, assisted by new DS Nelson, arrives in the village of Morton Shallows to investigate the death of furniture maker and local philanderer Conor Bridgeman during a ghost-hunting party at the local Manor House. The murder victim had been stabbed with an antique sword. The Manor has a haunted reputation involving stories of a blacksmith's daughter, and the voice of a young girl on a tape recording from the night of the murder adds to the mystery. Ross Clymer, landlord of the Blacksmiths Arms pub, has his own version of the ghost story, but also becomes a victim when he is discovered in his walk-in freezer, having been bludgeoned to death with a blacksmith's hammer. The identities and history of many of the characters must be unravelled before the detectives arrive at the truth. First appearance of Gwilym Lee as Detective Sergeant Charlie Nelson
97	2	"Let Us Prey"	Alex Pillai	Paul Logue	8 January 2014	April–May 2013	6.06
Art historian Philip Hamilton is restoring a medieval fresco is unearthed in the church crypt of Midsomer St Claire. When his partner Nancy Dewar is found dead in a river, a series of murders commences that appear to be inspired by macabre illustrations in the fresco. As the village prepares for storms and flooding, Barnaby and Nelson realise that the motive for the murders is not religious but is connected to a hidden secret.
98	3	"Wild Harvest"	Renny Rye	Rachel Cuperman and Sally Griffiths	15 January 2014	May–June 2013	6.24
When the body of farmer Martin Strickland is found in woodland, it transpires that he was covered in truffle oil and mauled to death by a wild boar. Barnaby and Nelson head to Midsomer Wyvern. Strickland was the landlord of Wyvern House, an upmarket and picturesque country house restaurant run by a passionate celebrity chef, Ruth Cameron (Sharon Small). The detectives race to find the motive for the murder, as Strickland's daughter is also killed and attempts are made on the lives of other staff of Wyvern House. Hayley Mills guest stars.
99	4	"The Flying Club"	Luke Watson	Michael Aitkens	5 February 2014	July–August 2013	6.05
When Bernard King, the owner of Finchmere airfield, is dropped to his death from a plane, Barnaby and Nelson enter a world of stunt pilots and military heroes. Upon investigating, they discover many hidden secrets. Possible suspects include anti-aircraft campaigners and employees who might lose their jobs after an imminent restructuring of the flying club. A tragic mission in World War II seems to hold a clue. Guest stars include Bernard Cribbins and June Whitfield.
100	5	"The Killings of Copenhagen"	Alex Pillai	Paul Logue	12 February 2014	September–October 2013	6.54
Eric Calder, Chairman and boss of Calder's Biscuits, is found murdered while on a business trip in Copenhagen. He had been poisoned with strychnine applied to a box of Calder's biscuits. It is discovered the box had been sent from the village of Badger's Drift, home to Calder's firm. The detectives team up with two female Danish police officers to investigate, where suspects and motives abound before the mystery is unravelled. First appearance of Betty Barnaby

=== Series 17 (2015) ===
No. overall	No. in series	Title	Directed by	Written by	Original release date	Filming Date	Viewers (millions)
101	1	"The Dagger Club"	Alex Pillai	Chris Murray	28 January 2015	April–May 2014	5.91
The crime festival and book fair open in the village of Luxton Deeping. Shortly after, an announcement is made, during a meeting of a newly discovered manuscript by the late crime writer George Summersbee. When the manuscript is stolen and a woman is found dead after spinning a roulette wheel trap, Barnaby and Nelson know they are set to work to uncover many secrets and obsessions within the village.
102	2	"Murder by Magic"	Charles Palmer	Rachel Cuperman and Sally Griffiths	4 February 2015	June–July 2014	5.59
When the village church becomes the setting for a magic show by famous illusionist Gideon Latimer, it starts a series of mysterious events in Midsomer Oaks, when pub landlady and pianist Hannah Altman is crushed during the opening set piece. After the box that Gideon had made his entrance in suddenly falls, Kate Wilding discovers the safety wires had been sabotaged, leading Barnaby and Nelson to wonder if Gideon had been the real target. More murders follow and the police need to act quickly to catch the killer and find out why.
103	3	"The Ballad of Midsomer County"	Renny Rye	Paul Logue	11 February 2015	May–June 2014	5.39
Little Crosby are hosting its folk festival and event organiser Toby Winning is shortly found dead, having drowned in a bowl of eggs and live eels. The murder seemed to have been inspired by a ballad by late musician Johnny Carver. Toby had recently announced plans to relocate the event to London, which would have proved very costly for entrepreneur Frank Wainwright. Many villagers come under suspicion, and when two more murders echo lyrics from the same song, the detectives need to catch the person responsible.
104	4	"A Vintage Murder"	Nick Laughland	Lisa Holdsworth	18 February 2015	August 2014	5.03
The launch of the latest sparkling wine, which is produced by the Carnarvon Estate Winery in Midsomer Vinae, loses all its fizz when wine critic Nadia Simons gives it a very harsh review. Moments later, guests who had been sampling the vintage start collapsing. Owner William Carnarvon suspects the Farmers' Wives' Association of trying to destroy his business. Kate Wilding tells Barnaby and Nelson that the glasses had been laced with slug poison. Not long afterward, Simons is killed on site of the winery. As the investigation progresses, Barnaby and Nelson must find out why the killing of a young girl correlates to this crime and who is responsible. Last appearance of Dr Kate Wilding

=== Series 18 (2016) ===
No. overall	No. in series	Title	Directed by	Written by	Original release date	Filming Date	Viewers (millions)
105	1	"Habeas Corpus"	Alex Pillai	Rachel Cuperman and Sally Griffiths	6 January 2016	March–April 2015	6.04
When wealthy landowner Gregory Lancaster's body goes missing on the night of his death, it starts a series of mysterious events in the village of Little Malton. DCI Barnaby, DS Nelson, and new forensic pathologist Kam Karimore enter a very macabre world of body-snatching. Nothing is quite what it seems, and when another strange event takes place, the detectives set out to catch the culprit. First appearance of Dr Kam Karimore
106	2	"The Incident at Cooper Hill"	Renny Rye	Paul Logue	13 January 2016	April–May 2015	5.90
Nothing prepares a forest ranger for, when driving through the forest, she suddenly gets stopped by mysterious lights in the sky over UFO hotspot Cooper Hill. She subsequently disappears from her truck. UFO spotters visiting the site of her disappearance are convinced alien activity is to blame. When her dead body is found, Barnaby and Nelson share the spotters' thoughts, and their investigation brings them to the local RAF base. The detectives discover suspicions, betrayals, and long held buried secrets dating back more than twenty years. They also unearth that secret research was being conducted at the RAF base, too, using aerial spying equipment. The case also leads them to uncover secret affairs between villagers and RAF personnel to catch the culprit responsible.
107	3	"Breaking the Chain"	Rob Evans	Chris Murray	27 January 2016	June–July 2015	5.80
The village of Burwood Mantle is hosting an international cycling competition, when the race leader defies orders, beats his teammate to the finishing line, and is subsequently murdered. It literally opens up many jealousies and betrayals amongst his fellow competitors, with sponsorship concerns, blackmail, bribery, and more to explore, before more murder occurs.
108	4	"A Dying Art"	Matt Carter	Jeff Povey	3 February 2016	July–August 2015	5.54
A new sculpture park opens in the village of Angel's Rise. On its opening night, Brandon Monkford is found murdered beside one of the centrepiece sculptures. It transpires that after Brandon's wife Alexandra had started a relationship with Daniel Fargo, Brandon had cut Alexandra and their two children from his will, leaving the sculpture park instead to Tony Pitt. There is fury in the village when Tony reveals all of his plans for the sculpture park. Tony is the next murder victim and is discovered near the sculpture park. Further mystery ensues when it emerges that Lance Orden, the famous artist believed to have created the sculptures, had plagiarised his ideas.
109	5	"Saints and Sinners"	Renny Rye	Lisa Holdsworth	10 February 2016	August–September 2015	5.83
When the archaeologists working on the dig in Midsomer Cicely unearth Cicely herself, this causes celebration. But shortly afterwards, the leader of the dig is murdered and found in one of the excavated trenches. DCI Barnaby and DS Nelson soon uncover many misdeeds in the village, and almost everyone has a skeleton in the closet that they would rather keep hidden. The truth will resurface but not before more murders take place.
110	6	"Harvest of Souls"	Nick Laughland	Caleb Ranson	17 February 2016	September–October 2015	5.60
When the annual harvest fair arrives in the village of Whitcombe Mallet, it reopens old wounds for some villagers. After the son of an equestrian centre owner is found trampled by his own horse, the detectives have to look into a case with much complexity that has its roots in the past, in order to solve an investigation where nothing is what it seems. Last appearances of DS Charlie Nelson and Sykes the dog

=== Series 19 (2016–2018) ===
No. overall	No. in series	Title	Directed by	Written by	UK air date	Filming Date	Viewers (millions)
111	1	"The Village That Rose from the Dead"	Nick Laughland	Rachel Cuperman and Sally Griffiths	18 December 2016	April–May 2016	5.68
The village of Little Auburn, which had been requisitioned by the army in World War II and afterwards abandoned, is to be reopened. There are competing visions among the villagers for its future. Finn Thornberry, who had envisioned an eco-friendly village, is found crushed to death by a tank. DCI Barnaby and new DS Jamie Winter investigate and find suspects among the factions of rival bidders. When Roderick Craven, the head of the judging panel that will decide Little Auburn's redevelopment, and his brother Milo are also found murdered, an unexpected new beneficiary of the rights to the village comes to light. First appearances of DS Jamie Winter and Paddy the dog
112	2	"Crime and Punishment"	Renny Rye	Paul Logue	4 January 2017	May–June 2016	6.25
The Bleakridge Watch is a vigilante group established by Ingrid Lockston after her brother was killed in an unsolved hit and run incident. The police investigate when Watch member Angus Colton is found dead in his butcher shop while looking into a series of burglaries. The Watch does not have everyone's support, with a notable opponent being pub landlord Mitch McAllister, who becomes a prime suspect when another member of the group is killed. Barnaby and Winter suspect that both murders are connected to the previous death of Ingrid Lockston's brother.
113	3	"Last Man Out"	Matt Carter	Jeff Povey	11 January 2017	June–July 2016	6.55
Lower Pampling sees a cricket tournament with a new format that controversially breaks with tradition. When star cricketer Leo Henderson is murdered in the club's training shed, DCI Barnaby and DS Winter eventually find out that this case is about gambling, bribery, burglary, and the disappearance of a local woman. Winter finds it suspicious when the man who found the body, Jack Morris, keeps showing up before him and Barnaby as they investigate. Barnaby is surprised when he sees Morris for the first time – his former DS Ben Jones, now promoted to DI in Brighton, and working undercover. Guest appearance of Jason Hughes as DI Ben Jones
114	4	"Red in Tooth & Claw"	Steve Hughes	Lisa Holdsworth	18 January 2017	August–September 2016	5.98
When the annual summer pet show comes to the village of Bellville, it is rocked by the murder of a local estate agent, Seb Huntington. He is discovered in the marquee, surrounded by live rabbits. DCI Barnaby and DS Winter explore whether the motive was animal-rights activism, theft of one of the prize-winning pets, or something more sinister, to catch the culprit.
115	5	"Death by Persuasion"	Alex Pillai	Chris Murray	20 August 2017 (AUS); 13 May 2018 (UK)	September–October 2016	5.82
Shortly after a young woman takes a walk into woodland dressed in period attire from a Jane Austen event in the village, her body is found stabbed with a quill. It is discovered that she was a journalist curious about the village's new trial healthcare drone delivery programme. Barnaby and Winter find themselves with many suspects and motives and work out that the answer lies in the past.
116	6	"The Curse of the Ninth"	Matt Carter	Julia Gilbert	27 August 2017 (AUS); 20 May 2018 (UK)	October–November 2016	4.98
At the end of the Thassington classical music festival in the village church, the winner of the Falconer Award is announced as Jacob Wheeler. There are many shocked and disappointed musicians and audience members, who feel that pianist Zak Sowande should have won. When Jacob is found strangled with a violin string and the treasured Stradivarius violin on loan to him disappears, Barnaby and Winter must delve into rivalries, disappointments, and hidden identities. Last appearance of Dr Kam Karimore

=== Series 20 (2019–2020) ===
No. overall	No. in series	Title	Directed by	Written by	UK air date	Filming Date	Viewers (millions)
117	1	"The Ghost of Causton Abbey"	Matt Carter	Helen Jenkins	25 May 2018 (Norway); 10 March 2019 (UK)	March–April 2017	6.39
Adam Asoba is found murdered, having been boiled to death in one of the vats at the newly opened brewery of the famously cursed abbey in Midsomer. Dr Fleur Perkins, a new pathologist, tells Barnaby and Winter that Adam Asoba was living under a false name, and that he actually died three years earlier, under the name Adam Dumont. Adam's widower, Kwame Asante, turns up at Adam's house admitting the truth. It seems that he and Adam had big debts, and the only solution for them was for Adam to fake his death so that Kwame could start a new life by collecting a life insurance. The first murder seems to be the end of it, but when Emani Taylor, the woman responsible for the new brewery, is also murdered, Barnaby and Winter must look deeper to find the killer. First appearance of Dr Fleur Perkins
118	2	"Death of the Small Coppers"	Paul Harrison	Chris Murray	1 June 2018 (Norway); 17 March 2019 (UK)	April–May 2017	6.00
The body of Mahesh Sidana, butterfly collector and founding member of an elite IQ society, is found pinned to a wall in a manner akin to his treasured butterfly specimens. This is the first of a series of strange murders that evoke trapped insects. DCI Barnaby and DS Winter are thrust into a crime that impacts not only their community, but also internationally. With the help of an old friend, they set out to catch the culprit before another victim is found. Note: To mark the 20th anniversary series, 20 'Easter eggs' references were included in this episode.
119	3	"Drawing Dead"	Toby Frow	Jeff Povey	8 June 2018 (Norway); 19 May 2019 (UK)	May–June 2017	4.76
After receiving a head injury from a horse kick, Francesca Lounds falls into a coma for two years. As she awakens, she is murdered when someone unplugs her life-support respirator and a rolled-up comic book is inserted into her throat. Her son, Barrett Lounds, is later found murdered when someone pulls him onto a large and sharpened paper cutter, slitting his throat in the process. During these murders, the village of Carver Valley is hosting a comic book festival, and it appears that someone has predicted the murders. A third murder attempt follows, and Barnaby and Winter find out that the murders are connected to events on the same night when Francesca Lounds was injured.
120	4	"The Lions of Causton"	Matt Carter	Nick Hicks-Beach	29 June 2018 (Norway); 26 August 2019 (UK)	June–July 2017	4.65
Mark Adler is found dead in a cryogenic treatment chamber, where the temperature was set to –150 degrees C, freezing him to death. He had bought and professionalised a local rugby club in Midsomer, the Causton Lions, but it seems that is not the only reason others bore grudges against Mark. Then the talented baker and chocolatier at the shop owned by Mark's wife Samantha, Dominic Braun, is found dead in the kitchen, drowned in chocolate. Now, it is up to Barnaby and Winter to find the real connection between the murders, and solve the riddle of a blackmailer's missing photos.
121	5	"Till Death Do Us Part"	Audrey Cooke	Helen Jenkins	6 July 2018 (Norway); 6 January 2020 (UK)	July–August 2017	5.59
Laurel Newman is found murdered on the night of her wedding to Gavin Webster, son of Sarah Barnaby's old friend Hazel. A talk radio host, Laurel had been receiving online harassment as well as packages containing dead animals, which Gavin accuses the police of not taking seriously. Serena Madison, who Gavin previously jilted, had to provide Laurel's wedding dress from her design and vintage business because their wedding package was won in a magazine competition. When Serena is murdered while modelling one of her dresses at a wedding fair fashion show, Barnaby and Winter find a new link between the two victims. They will have to unravel the connections amongst Laurel's co-host Jordan, their producer Aisha, Laurel's widowed friend Marcia, Jordan's daughter Grace, the wedding planner Juliet, and Gavin's parents Phil and Hazel, before it is too late.
122	6	"Send in the Clowns"	Nick Laughland	Julia Gilbert	13 July 2018 (Norway); 14 January 2020 (UK)	August–September 2017	5.12
Terry Bellini, a circus performer, had told his partner Les Morrison that he was about to leave the town, with his wife and daughter, as he had been offered a role at another circus. Soon afterwards, Terry is shot dead while performing. Later, Ashley Denton, a volunteer for a sword show, is killed because the prop swords used in the trick act had been tampered with. Curtis Ferabbee, brother of the circus ringmaster Joe Ferabbee, wants to get rid of the circus, but when he is found murdered at his own abattoir, the circus lives on. It is later revealed that a previous death is the central theme of the murder case, and the murderer now seeks revenge.

=== Series 21 (2020–2021) ===
No. overall	No. in series	Title	Directed by	Written by	Original release date	Filming Date	Viewers (millions)
123	1	"The Point of Balance"	Audrey Cooke	Nick Hicks-Beach	1 December 2019 (US); 21 January 2020 (UK)	March–April 2019	4.82
Ballroom dancer Rosa Corrigan is found murdered in her home on the night after the start of the annual ‘Paramount Dance Extravaganza’. Her brother Duncan is also found murdered. Barnaby and Winter must investigate rival dancers and their jealous partners, while also having to contend with corporate sponsors and Barnaby's estranged father Ned.
124	2	"The Miniature Murders"	Toby Frow	Helen Jenkins	11 December 2019 (US); 4 February 2020 (UK)	May–June 2019	5.62
Prolific real estate agent Alexander Beauvoisin is murdered in front of a crowd at the unveiling of a new dolls house collection at Midsomer Museum of the Family. Alexander was known as an unpopular landlord in the village, and is discovered to be an estranged husband who had betrayed his wife for a new lover known as Holly Ackroyd. But when Jemima Starling is murdered, suspicions are roused when it is revealed that Jemima was also in love with Alexander. Holly Ackroyd is found to be police Sergeant Leanne Carpenter. A previous incident is soon revealed, helping Barnaby and Winter to find the person responsible for the killings and how the two murders are connected.
125	3	"The Sting of Death"	Matt Carter	Julia Gilbert	18 December 2019 (US); 21 March 2021 (UK)	April–May 2019	5.56
Apley Court, in the village of Granville Norton, is home to historic beehives that produce top-of-the-range ‘Apley Gold’ honey. Master beekeeper Ambrose Deddington attributes his survival from a life-threatening cancer to a combination of Apley Gold and bee venom. When he is injured trying to prevent the theft of his beloved bees, Barnaby and Winter investigate. Later the local doctor, Serena Lowe, is found murdered, and stung to death. Barnaby and Winter discover that a previous event is the key to the case.
126	4	"With Baited Breath"	Jennie Darnell	Jeff Povey	25 December 2019 (US); 28 March 2021 (UK)	July–August 2019	4.94
Tensions run high in the village of Solomon Gorge when a fishing competition, and an extreme obstacle course, are both scheduled for same weekend. The excitement for these two events soon turns to fear when the electrocuted body of Lex Bedford is found within the water obstacle. Two further murders, of Ned Skye and Cornelius Tetbury, soon follow. But it is only later when Barnaby and Winter learn of the death of Lola Silvermane ten years previously, who had been believed to be travelling the world after she left the village, that they uncover the key to the case.

=== Series 22 (2021–2023) ===
No. overall	No. in series	Title	Directed by	Written by	Original release date	Filming Date	Viewers (millions)
127	1	"The Wolf Hunter of Little Worthy"	Matt Carter	Chris Murray	4 April 2021	October–November 2020	5.18
There is a full moon over Little Worthy at Halloween and the people in the area are thrilled when local photographer Steve Skelton wins a competition in the village with his own creation of the Wolf Hunter. Unexpectedly, the Wolf Hunter is becoming a viral meme, with people coming from miles around to explore the woods of Little Worthy in the hope of catching a glimpse of the beast. The excitement turns into fear when Jez Gladberry is found murdered in the woods, killed in the unique way of the Wolf Hunter.
128	2	"The Stitcher Society"	Roberto Bangura	Jeff Povey	11 April 2021	November–December 2020	4.99
Having been controversially acquitted of the murder of Viola Deepdale, Toby Wagner tries to settle down in the village of Tamworth Springs. His desire to join the local Stitcher Society is not well received by the other members. Reuben Tooms, Viola's brother in law, tries to persuade them that Toby is innocent. Later, Reuben is found murdered with a shinai stick in his chest. Shortly after, Georgie Tremayne is found murdered at the Stitcher Society's premises, and the detectives suspect that she had spoken to Reuben about Toby on the night that he was murdered. Then a third victim dies in a suspected clay pigeon shooting accident, but it seems that someone tampered with the shotgun. There is a long list of suspects with many motives ranging from blackmail to revenge.
129	3	"Happy Families"	Audrey Cooke	Nick Hicks-Beach	27 July 2021 (Sweden); 3 October 2021 (UK)	January–February 2021	4.58
Barnaby and Winter are stranded on a remote island manor owing to a storm after Victor Karras, owner of Karras Games, dies falling down the stairs and hit with a falling statue. Victor's wife, Eleanor, is pregnant and plans to give the child to her sister Alicia. Later, Hugo Welles is also murdered and Barnaby and Winter discover the key to the case.
130	4	"The Scarecrow Murders"	Christine Lalla	Helen Jenkins	3 August 2021 (Sweden); 29 May 2022 (UK)	March–April 2021	3.47
Naomi Ashworth is found murdered, dressed up as a scarecrow in her own shop during the first day of the Midsomer Scarecrow Festival in the village of Little Upton. Barnaby and Winter learn later on that Naomi and her friend Adele Paige ran the Old Vogue Vintage Emporium together. A reporter starts to take pictures and when Winter tries to stop her and tell her to leave the scene, he recognises her instantly. It is his old girlfriend from school, Caitlin Dawson. Caitlin makes Barnaby and Winter aware of Oscar Hayden and the £15 million he won back in 2008. Oscar is the latest Reverend in Little Upton and lives in a mansion with his daughter, Bryony. A while later, Oscar Hayden is found murdered, displayed and dressed up as a scarecrow. Barnaby and Winter starts talking with the responsible sales manager at the company Ventuity, Thea Stannard, and they become conscious of her current relationship with Stephen Ashworth, Naomi's husband. Thea Stannard is soon found murdered, and the pieces start to fall into place. Barnaby and Winter get the full picture of Ventuity and it is revealed that Naomi Ashworth, Oscar Hayden and Thea Stannard all had connections to a company that may have put people's lives at risk.
131	5	"For Death Prepare"	Toby Frow	Julia Gilbert	17 August 2021 (Sweden); 28 May 2023 (UK)	April–May 2021	3.62
An amateur operatic society, The Midsomer Mummers, are busy rehearsing for their charity concert, The Pirates of Penzance, when the body of an unknown man, later identified as Vince Summersby, is found in their theatre. Later, while the preparations are still underway, Katisha Empson dies falling down the stairs. Her niece, Phyllis Fernsby, tells Barnaby of her suspicion that Katisha's doctor, Simon Charteris, might have been involved in her aunt's death as it is revealed that he was the main beneficiary of her will. Later, Graham Handsworth is found dead at the theatre's stage, and Jeremy Whittingdale almost gets murdered on the night before the Pirates of Penzance premiere. Barnaby and Winter realise that the culprit must be someone connected to the play.
132	6	"The Witches of Angel's Rise"	Gill Wilkinson	Maria Ward	13 December 2021 (Italy); 27 August 2023 (UK)	May–June 2021	3.37
Barnaby and Winter have to step into the world of spirituality when the body of Tilly Mulroney is found surrounded by ritual symbols on the first night of the Angel's Rise Psychic Fayre. Simeon Dagley falls under suspicion when it is revealed that one of his Devil Tarot cards was found beside Tilly's body, but a while later, Simeon is also found murdered, hanging upside down from a tree in the woodland. It transpires that Simeon may have figured out the identity of Tilly's murderer, by looking at his Tarot cards. DCI Barnaby soon learns the truth about the previous death of Bea Saint-Stephens and he realises that her death may be the key to the murder case.

=== Series 23 (2024) ===
No. overall	No. in series	Title	Directed by	Written by	Original release date	Filming Date	Viewers (millions)
133	1	"The Blacktrees Prophecy"	Roberto Bangura	Jeff Povey	12 December 2022 (US); 14 April 2024 (UK)	March–April 2022	3.96
The village of Blacktrees-on-Marsh has always been haunted by the shadow of the Blacktrees Prophecy, and for some the fear has seeped into them so deeply that a small group of locals founded Midsomer's first doomsday prepper group. One morning, their leader, Warren Kaine, receives the call he has been waiting for. The nuclear missiles have launched. Vindicated, Warren races to the bunker and radios for the other preppers to meet him there. But as dawn breaks over Blacktrees-on-Marsh, the sun rises over village green serenity, rather than a scorched earth. Warren's resentful wife, Clodagh, arrives at the bunker to tell him it was a hoax, but discovers Warren dead. Later on it is revealed that Clodagh has been having an affair with her best friend's husband, Guy Burrows, who once used to be in the prepper group. During a conversation with Guy, Clodagh admits she is relieved that she is finally free of Warren. As Clodagh awaits to collect Warren's life insurance, she informs Paige that she wants to partner up with her, using the money from Warren's well paid life insurance to save Paige's bookshop. The joy is, however, short-lived. Barnaby and Winter informs Clodagh that Warren called off the life insurance, as he believed it was no longer necessary, and it may seem like Warren was aware of Clodagh's affair with Guy. All seems well, but when Guy Burrows is found murdered shortly after being struck by a lifeboat, the suspicion soon falls on Clodagh, now that both her husband and lover are dead. Paige collects Guy's life insurance, and her bookshop is saved. Randall Salt, a former member of the prepper group, soon falls victim to the killer and the Blacktrees Prophecy has been completed. Soon, a matter of parentage comes to light. The drowning death of a young woman, and a photo of a child in a car, help Barnaby and Winter to solve this case.
134	2	"The Debt of Lies"	Gill Wilkinson	Nick Hicks-Beach	19 December 2022 (US); 16 July 2024 (UK)	April–May 2022	3.31
Sarah and John Barnaby are attending an event to celebrate the retirement of DCS Elaine Bennet. At the party, Sarah is introduced to Sebastian Cabot, former colleague of John Barnaby. Sebastian informs the pair that Elaine is his new neighbour, as she has recently moved into Challis Court. Set up by an independent charity fifteen years ago, Challis is a collection of desirable apartments within a grand estate providing comfortable and secure housing for retired police officers. As the event draws to a close, Barnaby sees that behind the handshakes and smiles, some of the officers are harbouring resentment and bitterness. After bidding farewell to her colleagues, Elaine heads home, only to be found dead in the Bennets' family car the following morning after crashing into a tree. The stolen heist money in the village years previously, which acquired the name "The Goldman-Forbes Job", draws attention to Barnaby and Winter, and it may seem like the murder of Elaine Bennet might be connected. However, when Elaine Bennet's husband, Damian Bennet is found murdered, it is revealed that the two murders are connected to a well kept secret.
135	3	"A Grain of Truth"	Paul Gibson	Julia Gilbert	26 December 2022 (US); 23 July 2024 (UK)	May–June 2022	3.62
The residents in the village of Lower Blissingham are up in arms concerning Tom and Chrissie Larkton, the proprietors of the bakery at the mill in the village. At first glance, it looks like the situation is manageable, but when Chrissie receives a cake with the word "cursed" baked inside the sponge and Tom ends a contract with Nathan Duncroft after accusing him of using pesticides, everything changes. The situation turns to fear when Chrissie and some of the people at the Highwayman Inn pub get poisoned. Chrissie has seizures during the poisoning and Tom and Gabriel Arnson save her from drowning, when they watch her walking towards the water. Nathan Duncroft is found murdered shortly afterwards and it is revealed that he may have been responsible for the village poisoning as revenge for the cancelled contract with Tom and Chrissie Larkton. Lara Milton attends one of Tom's courses under the false name of Sophie Rendal and it seems like she was previously in a relationship with Tom. Vanessa Debouverie, a friend of Sarah who has lived in California for many years, comes to visit the Barnaby's during her trip to Midsomer, and she starts flirting with both Tom Larkton and Jamie Winter. Ricky Naybury is lured to his death and Tom Larkton gets knocked out and then tied up. Chrissie comes to the rescue and does everything she can to help him, but to no avail. When he is pulled into the water a moment later, Winter saves him from drowning. It is revealed that the victims posed a threat to someone in Lower Blissingham and the deepest wish the killer has is to protect that person from being hurt again.
136	4	"Dressed to Kill"	Leon Lopez	Maria Ward	2 January 2023 (US); 10 November 2024 (UK)	June–July 2022	3.11
The residents in the village of Elverton-Cum-Latterly are about to start their rehearsals for a charity drag queen extravaganza, when Lois Springfield is found murdered. After receiving a warning message, Malik Payne is almost run over by a car and it now seems that someone is not happy about the charity drag queen extravaganza. At the end of the show, Evelyn Hardy is found murdered and the terminally ill Rocco Templeton collapses at the village green. It soon transpires that someone wants to start a new life at a new place. A well kept secret has been held concealed, and someone's life has been changed forever.

=== Series 24 (2025–2026) ===
No. overall	No. in series	Title	Directed by	Written by	Original release date	Filming Date	Viewers (millions)
137	1	"The Devil's Work"	Roberto Bangura	Julia Gilbert	10 November 2023 (Croatia); 29 December 2025 (UK)	March–April 2023	TBA
Henry Shirewell, patriarch of the Shirewell family, has lately passed away from natural causes, and a funeral is soon being held at the Stourwick Estate. A family meeting is taking place shortly afterwards, and the other members of the Shirewell family are up in arms when the ceramasist Lucian Shirewell, the eldest son of Henry Shirewell, informs his family about his plans for the Estate. The Shirewell's tenure will end with him, as the Estate now will become the home of a free-thinking artist’ community. Lucian reveals that Long Cross farm will become a new solar park, the dower house will be changed into an artist's retreat and their family chapel will be turned into a gallery. Jordana Linsbury, Lucian's lover, who lives on the family premises, is found dead, and it is revealed that she had a row with Lucian shortly before she was murdered. Sarah and Betty come to Stourwick Estate to attend an open day event, and during the house tour, Betty goes missing. She is soon found and admits she wanted to explore the house on her own to search for the gold that disappeared earlier in the day. Francis Shirewell is murdered the same evening when he is garroted with a medium-gauge wire. Caleb Blundell, Lucien's assistant is pushed inside the kiln and is burned alive when the killer closes the door right in front of him. It transpires that the death of Clarissa Shirewell in 1985, and the death of a child, hold the clues to this murder case, as someone cannot bear a thought of losing Stourwick Estate.
138	2	"Book of the Dead"	Gill Wilkinson	Jeff Povey	11 December 2023 (US); 30 December 2025 (UK)	April–May 2023	TBA
The residents in the village of Mods Mire are gathered at the village church to celebrate the 10th anniversary of "The Seeker", a book written by Bertram Jewel. It transpires that his famous book will be republished with an additional page where a new set of clues have been drawn. The excitement, however, turns to anger when the reporter reveals that Bertram Jewel was imprisoned 24 years ago at the time he went by his real name, Robert Grimes and that the new edition of "The Seeker" may just be another con. Shortly afterwards, Bertram is found murdered in the woodland and during a conversation with Ludo Trask, DCI Barnaby discovers that Bertram showed Ludo the new additional page shortly before he was killed in the woodland. Venetia Butts walks into the forest and is murdered a moment later when a sheet is thrust over her head. She is strung up between two trees with the sheet covering her dead body. Venetia's son is found murdered in the village church after being drowned in a pail of water and then placed in a yoga position. Barnaby and Winter are looking for answers and find out that Bertram had an accomplice when he was imprisoned 24 years ago. A nickname for Bertram that Barnaby has heard before uncovers the truth and shortly afterwards the murderer is brought to justice.
139	3	"Claws Out"	Paul Gibson	Helen Jenkins	18 December 2023 (US); 28 December 2026 (UK)	May–June 2023	TBA
The residents in the village of Binwell are searching for a lost dog. Frank Bailey alongside his wife Kim, Madeline Saunders, Reece Fleming, among other volunteers, find the dog after receiving coordinates suggesting that the dog is located at Briar's farm. Frank Bailey is soon found murdered inside a dog cage, moments after blaming Daniella Saunders for being clumsy. Kim Bailey informs Barnaby that a Czechoslovakian wolfdog by the name of Storm has been missing for the last four days. Kim Bailey reveals that the cage Frank was found murdered in belongs to Storm. Tai Yang, the boy who found Frank's body, appears to be Frank's nephew and shortly afterwards, Kim receives the news that Tai will inherit fifty percent of Frank's estate when he turns twenty-one. Kim fears that she may end up selling her house, in order to pay out Tai’s rightful inheritance. Tai is, however, soon found murdered in his caravan, after being electrocuted with a dog training collar. Tai’s death now indicates that Kim can keep her house, and Frank’s money to herself. As her husband and nephew are dead, Kim appears to be the prime suspect, but when Lorna McIntosh, a woman who was accused of stealing the villagers cats, is murdered through the window with a dog snare, it transpires that someone in the village will stop at nothing, to protect a person they truly love.
140	4	"A Climate of Death"	Leon Lopez	Maria Ward	25 December 2023 (US); 29 December 2026 (UK)	June–July 2023	TBA
The village of Goodman's Land, has, in the last three years, undergone adaptations to climate change. Addressed as "the greenest village in Midsomer", Goodman's Land was given its name during the 12th century by Arthur Havergal, Brian Havergal's ancestor. Goodman's Land has recently been purchased by the rich American Texan oilman Rooster Harlin, and some of the residents struggle to adjust to their village now turning green. Danny Tarleton and his father, Liam, dairy farmers in the village, are found murdered. Butcher Aldo McLean is accidentally murdered when the village hosts a chilli competition. It turns out that Aldo had been banned from participating before he was murdered, because Dixie Havergal accused him of cheating. It is revealed that one of the villagers has lived in the village under false pretences, hidden in plain sight, as the rightful buyer and the owner of Goodman's Land. A man named Dougie Duke, who used to live in the village, holds the clues to this murder case. It is soon revealed that Dougie had been involved with two different women in Goodman's Land, at the same time, in addition to being Rooster Harlin's brother.

=== Series 25 ===
No. overall	No. in series	Title	Directed by	Written by	Original release date	Filming Date	Viewers (millions)
141	1	"Treasures of Darkness"	Paul Gibson	Julia Gilbert	8 December 2025 (US); T.B.A. (UK)	March-April 2025	TBA
Tensions run high in the village of Goldworthy when two rival mudlarking groups turn up at the same spot in their search for antique treasures by the riverbank. The situation escalates when one member of each group, Jonathan Hoxham and Cole Densmore, have an altercation over a newly-discovered ampulla. The following morning, Jonathan is found dead, near the jetty by the river, the victim of a supposedly accidental drowning. It quickly becomes clear, however, that Jonathan was lured to his death, unaware of a newly emerged sinkhole by the riverbank. Meanwhile, Lucy Weaving visits her uncle, Richard Clissold, to find answers to her questions about her aunt, Jessica, Richard's little sister, who disappeared on the day she announced she was leaving the village, her relationship with her family having broken down. Soon after, a bicycle is found in the river, and Richard believes it may have belonged to his sister. Then, Rufus Coulter is murdered in his house, and Lucy Weaving receives a warning, demanding that she leave the village before she, too, is hurt. When, soon after, she is knocked unconscious, it is revealed that the murders have a connection to Jessica's disappearance all those years ago.
142	2	"Lawn of the Dead"	Roberto Bangura	Maria Ward	15 December 2025 (US); T.B.A. (UK)	April-May 2025	TBA
Wilfred Worrell, groundsman and referee for the Midsomer Deverell Lawn Bowling Club, is found murdered, shortly after a friendly competition draws to a close on the bowling green. Barnaby and Winter discover that besides his club duties, Wilf was also a local antiques dealer in the village, and Dr Ruth Gillan informs Barnaby that the friendly match had turned into a full-blown argument the day before, when Ollie Peterson accused Wilf of wrongly appointing the win to veteran bowls champion Archie Pollock and his team. Then, Archie enters Wilf's house, to find one of his paintings stolen and is knocked unconscious by the intruder. On the day of the championship final, Dale McManus is found murdered in the woods, and it is revealed that he may not have been the intended victim. Soon after, Archie Pollock is kidnapped, and a jealous murderer is uncovered.
143	3	"Death Strikes Three"	Darcia Martin	Jeff Povey	22 December 2025 (US); T.B.A. (UK)	May-June 2025	TBA
On the night following his engagement party, Brad Furbank is murdered at Godley Manor – pecked to death by a booby-trapped cuckoo clock. His fiancée, Francesca Bruce, was celebrating with friends following the party, and informs DCI Barnaby that Brad was living at the village pub and made his living trading bitcoin. Barnaby is also made aware that Frankie's father, Sir Alan, had introduced his supposed half-brother, Noah Conoboy, to his family at the engagement party. The cuckoo clock was a gift from Noah, and the question arises as to whether Sir Alan was the intended target. Kimonie Bullitt, local flower shop owner and head of the Godley Buzzard village council, recognises a woman as she walks into her shop and leaves an urgent voice message for Lady Myrtle Bruce, wife of Sir Alan, to inform her she thinks she has seen Aggy Marlowe in her shop. It is revealed that Lady Myrtle and Sir Alan lost their son, Francis, when he was just a one-year-old, and Kimonie lost her husband during a car accident. Aggy Marlowe – now going by the name Nessie Copeland – is found in the room that once belonged to Francis, by Sir Alan, and threatens to tell the truth about what happened to Francis. Before she manages to do so, however, she is bludgeoned to death in the woods. When Kimonie Bullitt is also found murdered – stuck to a chair with industrial glue in her mouth – it becomes clear that a reckless murderer will stop at nothing to keep dark secrets buried.
144	4	"Top of the Class"	Matt Carter	Helen Jenkins	29 December 2025 (US); T.B.A. (UK)	June–July 2025	TBA
Estelle Hallis, head teacher at Causton Grammar School, is killed on camera during a PTA meeting. It appears, that just moments before she was killed, a full-blown argument had occurred, between Estelle herself, and the PTA chairwoman, Moira Mayhew. A fundraiser featuring Moira’s brother, Piers Mayhew, had been cancelled. The topic of the disagreement was related to the school event being cancelled. A javelin is then identified as the murder weapon and DCI Barnaby and DS Winter initiates a conversation with Tim Crawford, who also attended the meeting. Kara Hallis, Estelle’s daughter, who by many in the village was believed to be on her way to Boston, is found murdered. Fleur informs Barnaby that Kara may have been dead for three or four days, by the time she was found, indicating that Kara was killed before her mother. When Dominic Mayhew is found dead in Moira Mayhew’s shop, after being stabbed with knitting needles, a story from someone’s past is unveiled, and a vindictive murderer is uncovered.

=== Series 26 ===
No. overall	No. in series	Title	Directed by	Written by	Original release date	Filming Date	Viewers (millions)
145	1	"Mindful to Murder"	Paul Gibson	Julia Gilbert	7 November 2026 (Australia ABC)	March-April 2026	TBA
146	2	"The Sons of Annerby"	Roberto Bangura	Maria Ward	7 November 2026 (Australia ABC)	April-May 2026	TBA
147	3	"A Menu for Murder"	Darcia Martin	Jeff Povey	7 November 2026 (Australia ABC)	May-June 2026	TBA
148	4	"Like and Subscribe"	Matt Carter	Helen Jenkins	7 November 2026 (Australia ABC)	June-July 2026	TBA
