= Dead in the Water (Midsomer Murders) =

- Midsomer Murders episode
- Episode no.: Season 8 Episode 2
- Directed by: Renny Rye
- Written by: Douglas Watkinson
- Original air date: 17 October 2004

Guest appearances
- Adrian Lukis (Phillip Trent); William Scott-Masson (John Parkway); Benedick Blythe (Guy Sweetman); Diana Quick (Claire Bonavita); Clemency Burton-Hill (Hettie Trent); Mark Frost (Vic Lynton); Emma Amos (Sandra Tate); Owain Yeoman (Henry Charlton)

Episode chronology
← Previous "Things That Go Bump in the Night"	Next → "Orchis Fatalis"

"Dead in the Water" is the second episode of the eighth season of British television show Midsomer Murders and the thirty seventh episode overall. It stars John Nettles as Detective Chief Inspector Tom Barnaby and John Hopkins as Detective Sergeant Dan Scott. The boating scenes were filmed in Henley, Oxfordshire.

== Plot ==
Barnaby is persuaded by his wife to take a day out at the Midsomer Regatta. He is soon called into action however, when a body appears during a race. He discovers it is Guy Sweetman, a member of the club, and something of a ladies man. Barnaby tries to solve both the murder, and a spate of robberies in the area, which ultimately prove to be connected.
