= Les Dennis =

English television presenter, actor and comedian (born 1953)

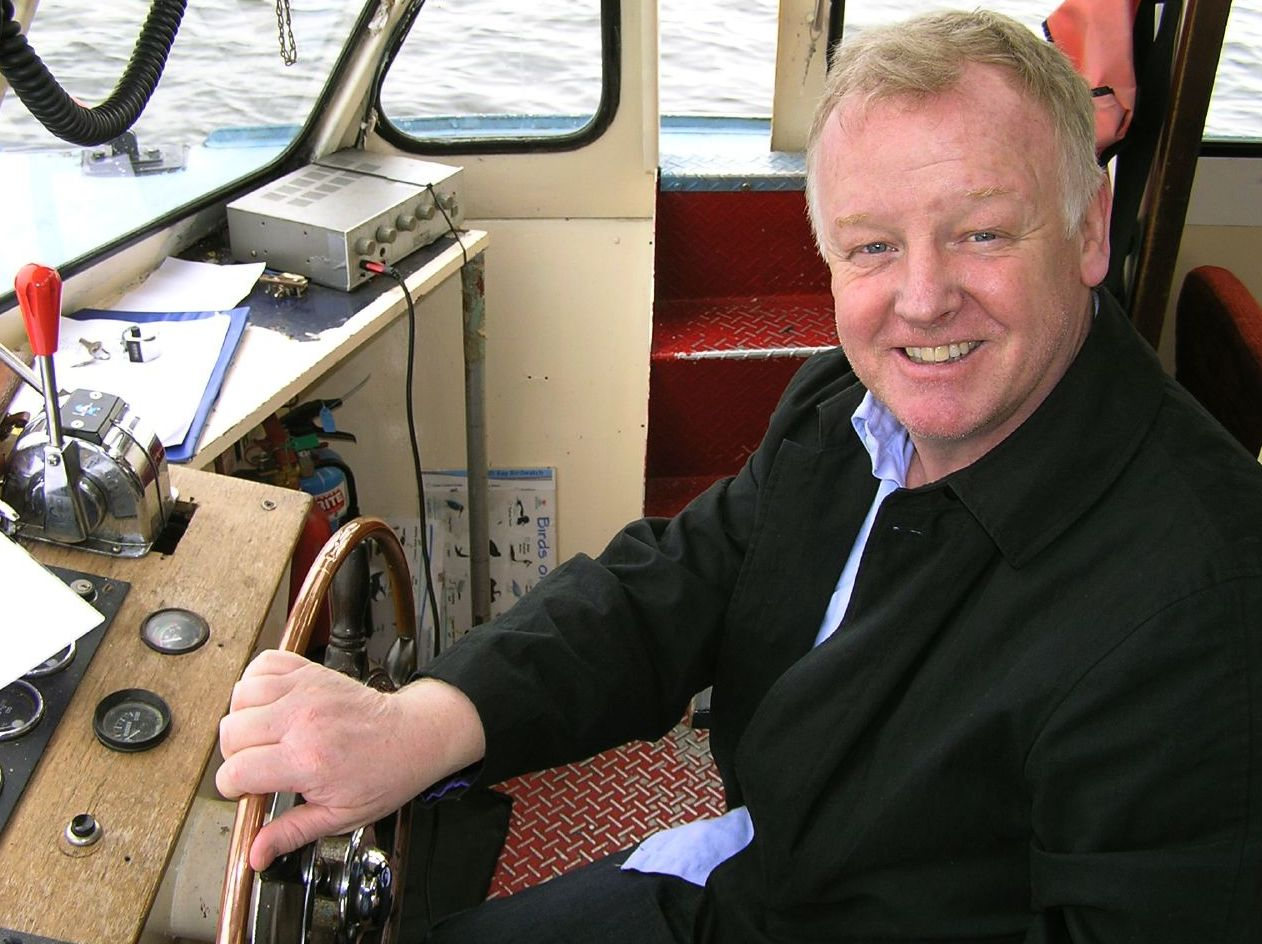
- Dennis in April 2010
- Born: Leslie Dennis Heseltine; 12 October 1953 (age 72); Liverpool, England
- Occupations: Television presenter; actor; comedian
- Years active: 1971–present
- Spouses: Lynne Webster (m. 1974; div. 1990); Amanda Holden (m. 1995; div. 2003); Claire Nicholson (m. 2009)
- Children: 3
- Website: lesdennis.uk

Leslie Dennis Heseltine (born 12 October 1953) is an English television presenter, actor and comedian. He presented Family Fortunes from 1987 to 2002.

== Early life ==
Dennis was born as Leslie Dennis Heseltine on 12 October 1953 in the Liverpool suburb of Garston. His mother worked in a factory while his father, who worked in a betting shop after serving in the Royal Navy during the Second World War, was listed as a football player on the books of Liverpool FC but did not play for the first team. He lived in the suburb of Speke for a while and attended the Stockton Wood and Joseph Williams primary schools, before going to Morrison Rose Lane Secondary Modern school in Allerton. From 1967 he went to Quarry Bank Comprehensive. Dennis left there in June 1972 with an A-level in Art and failed History and English Literature. He had a weekend job in the men's clothing store Burton whilst still at school, and started as a stand-up comedian in working men's clubs.

== Career ==
=== Early work and Family Fortunes ===
As a comedian, Dennis performed in social clubs all around the northwest of England. He was given the earliest opportunities in his home city of Liverpool; in his autobiography, he later credited husband-and-wife theatrical agents Stuart and Dorene Gillespie (who had themselves been a successful variety act) with discovering him. His debut radio broadcast was in 1971 on Stuart's BBC Radio Merseyside series Variety Time (the programs were taped in front of a live audience in Merseyside clubs). In 1974, he won the ITV talent show New Faces and appeared on numerous light entertainment shows. It's a common myth that he almost became the first contestant ever to score the maximum 120 points on New Faces, but had to settle for 119 when Tony Hatch gave him 9 out of 10 in his final mark, drawing derision from the rest of a judges' panel that included fellow Liverpool comedian Arthur Askey. He scored 39 for Presentation, 36 for Content, and 36 for Star Quality, meaning he only scored 111 with the score of 9 out of 10 leaving him one mark short of a maximum in just the Presentation category.

In 1982, Dennis joined as one of the teams on Russ Abbot's Madhouse and The Russ Abbot Show before forming a comedy partnership with fellow impressionist Dustin Gee, which in turn led to a series of their own, The Laughter Show. Following Gee's sudden and unexpected death in January 1986, Dennis carried on The Laughter Show as a solo performer and became the third host of Family Fortunes for a 15-year run between 1987 and 2002. It was at a recording of an episode of Family Fortunes in 1997 that Dennis was surprised by the BBC programme 'This Is Your Life'.

=== Theatre ===
Dennis' stage work includes Amos Hart in Chicago and Bill Snibson in Me and My Girl in the West End. He has starred in Skylight at the Water Mill Theatre in Newbury, Mr Wonderful at the Gateway Theatre in Chester, and Misery at the Coliseum Theatre in Oldham. He also appeared in Just Between Ourselves and co-starred alongside Janet Suzman in Cherished Disappointments in Love at London's Soho Theatre. He co-starred with Christopher Cazenove and John Duttine in a national tour of 'Art' and as Norman Bartholomew in Anthony Shaffer's dark comedy Murderer at London's Menier Chocolate Factory. He later starred in a hit season of Neville's Island at the Birmingham Repertory Theatre.

Dennis appeared as Mr. Fulton in High School Musical 2 on a UK tour from August 2009 to February 2010. He toured in Hairspray as Wilbur Turnblad alongside Michael Ball, Brian Conley and Michael Starke – who alternated the role of Edna Turnblad. He starred in the touring production of Legally Blonde The Musical in 2012, playing the role of Professor Callahan.

In 2017, Dennis played the role of Uncle Fester on the UK tour of the musical production of The Addams Family. The production starred Samantha Womack and Carrie Hope Fletcher.

In 2019, Dennis performed with the Royal Shakespeare Company in Restoration plays The Provoked Wife and Venice Preserved.

In 2021, Dennis made a return to the theatre when he played the role of Wilbur Turnblad in the 2021 revival of Hairspray at the London Coliseum.

In November and December 2021, Dennis performed as Sir Joseph in the English National Opera Performance of HMS Pinafore at the London Coliseum.

In June 2025, Dennis portrayed Petka in the Chichester Festival Theatre production of Anna Karenina.

=== Early film and TV ===
Dennis' film debut was in the 1996 film Intimate Relations. He also appeared in the comedy film Large and Wildlife, a short film directed by Nick Allsop. He had previously made appearances on two episodes of Bang Bang, It's Reeves and Mortimer in The "Club" sketch, where he played himself. When he took part in a video-only special of Shooting Stars in 1993, Vic Reeves when introducing him pronounced his name as though it were French, saying "Les Dennis, the French fire engine".

Dennis has appeared in an episode of The Bill in 2006 as Mr. Tom Walker, Brookside (as Jeff Evans; 2001) and episodes of Merseybeat, Family Affairs, Casualty, the short-lived revival of Crossroads, and Hotel Babylon.

=== Celebrity Big Brother ===
Dennis appeared in the second series of the UK Celebrity Big Brother during the period when his marriage to Amanda Holden was breaking down again – he described his time in the BB House as "not one of his wisest moves", although he went on to finish as runner-up to Mark Owen.

=== Extras ===
On 11 August 2005, Dennis appeared as a guest star in an episode of the first series of BBC sitcom Extras, written by and starring Ricky Gervais and Stephen Merchant. In this appearance, Dennis portrayed a fictional version of himself, alongside Gerard Kelly, who played a camp theatre director, the recurring character Bunny. Dennis would go on to say "you could say Extras changed my life."

=== 2006–2007 ===
In early 2006, Dennis presented and performed in BBC One's The Sound of Musicals and guested in New Street Law on BBC One.

In summer 2006, he played scriptwriter Nick Chase in a new comedy play called Marlon Brando's Corset, which toured the UK from July 2006, including a month-long run at the Edinburgh Fringe.

Dennis appeared as a guest in August 2006 in the ITV drama series The Bill, starring as a man suspected of murdering his father. Dennis appeared alongside fellow former Russ Abbot performer Lisa Maxwell, who played DI Samantha Nixon in the series.

At the 2006 Edinburgh International Television Festival, it was announced Dennis would make a return to the gameshow genre, presenting a new big-money quiz show titled In the Grid for Channel 5. The show debuted on 30 October 2006 and aired for one series. From April 2007, he also hosted UKTV Gold's TV Now and Then quiz show. The same month he guest-starred on BBC One's Holby City.

He appeared on The Friday Night Project as a panellist on "Who knows the most about the guest host?" when Rupert Everett guest hosted. In theatre Dennis guest-starred as narrator in Side by Side by Sondheim at The Venue, London.

As one of the team, he completed running the Safaricom Marathon in Lewa to raise funds for the BBC Wildlife Fund, screened on BBC One's Saving Planet Earth in July 2007.

In August 2007, he starred in the hit play Certified Male—about the highs and lows of modern manhood—at the Edinburgh Festival. He then toured in The Servant of Two Masters, directed by Michael Bogdanov and at Christmas he returned to pantomime after a ten-year break, co-starring in Cinderella with Hollywood veteran Mickey Rooney at the Empire Theatre, Sunderland, produced by First Family Entertainment.

=== 2008–2012 ===
Dennis's autobiography, Must The Show Go On?, was published by Orion in early 2008.

In April 2008, Dennis toured in Eurobeat Almost Eurovision before a West End season in the show. Also in 2008, he narrated Les Dennis's Home Video Heroes, a home video clip show broadcast on Challenge, and appeared in the ITV documentary Les Dennis' Liverpool, which was, coincidentally, broadcast a week after BBC Two ran Alexei Sayle's Liverpool, a three-part documentary on the city.

During the Christmas 2008 panto season, Dennis appeared as Buttons in Cinderella at the Empire Theatre, Liverpool. The pantomime also featured Jennifer Ellison as Cinderella, and Cilla Black as the Fairy Godmother. At Christmas 2008, Dennis was featured on the Wombats' Christmas single and video Is This Christmas? in aid of MENCAP.

In 2009, Dennis played Herbert Soppitt in J. B. Priestley's When We Are Married at the West Yorkshire Playhouse in Leeds, and the Playhouse in Liverpool. At Christmas 2009, he returned to the Liverpool Empire to appear in Peter Pan with actor Henry Winkler and again in 2010 to play the role of Aladdin's brother, Wishee Washee in Aladdin.

In 2010, Dennis began presenting the children's TV series Fee Fi Fo Yum for CBBC.

From 17 October 2011, Dennis started a week-long stint in Countdown's Dictionary Corner, ending on 21 October.

In 2011, he again worked with Ricky Gervais and Stephen Merchant, with recurring appearances as a fictionalised version of himself in the Warwick Davis comedy series, Life's Too Short. From August 2012, he performed in the play Jigsy at the Assembly Rooms (Edinburgh) as part of the Edinburgh Fringe Festival.

=== 2013–2014 ===
In 2013, Dennis was reunited with Warwick Davis when the pair joined the cast of the West End production of Monty Python's Spamalot at London's Playhouse Theatre. His next theatrical appearance came in an adaptation of Peter James' novella The Perfect Murder.

In 2013, Dennis was a contestant in Celebrity MasterChef. He finished as runner-up to Ade Edmondson. He has since returned to the show as a guest judge.

In December of that year, Dennis appeared in an episode of Midsomer Murders titled "The Christmas Haunting".

=== 2014–2020: Coronation Street ===
On 23 January 2014, it was announced that Dennis would join the long-running ITV soap opera Coronation Street, playing the part of Michael Rogers (later changed to Michael Rodwell after press release), a petty burglar. He began filming on 27 January 2014, and made his first appearance on TV on 24 March 2014. The show's producer Stuart Blackburn said: "Les is a fantastic performer and a real coup for Corrie. I can't wait for him to join the team".

On 18 November 2016, Dennis's character Michael Rodwell was killed off from Coronation Street, after suffering a heart attack and being left for dead by the show's villain, Michael's love rival Pat Phelan.

In April 2017, Dennis took the role of Uncle Fester in The Addams Family UK tour.

=== 2021–present: After Coronation Street and return to the stage ===
He starred in the 2021 West End revival of the musical Hairspray as Wilbur Turnblad opposite Michael Ball. In the summer of 2022, he was featured in a two-night only staged concert of the musical Treason.

In 2022, Dennis played a mind-reader in a film called Sideshow, a black comedy in the style of Stanley a Man of Variety or Peter Chelsom's Funny Bones. The film, also starring Anthony Head, April Pearson and Nathan Clarke, received a one-star review from Peter Bradshaw in The Guardian.

From 4 to 15 August, Dennis was the guest host on Countdown due to Colin Murray testing positive for COVID-19.

In October 2022, Dennis starred as Grandad in Only Fools and Horses The Musical at the Theatre Royal Haymarket, London.

In August 2023, Dennis was confirmed to be the final celebrity contestant to participate in the twenty-first series of Strictly Come Dancing. He was the first celebrity to be eliminated.

From 2023 to 2025, he was featured in the UK tours of the stage musicals 42nd Street and Ghost. In 2026, he's set to play Old Joe on the tenth anniversary UK tour of the Sara Bareilles musical Waitress.

== Personal life ==
Dennis has a son from his first marriage to Lynne Webster, which lasted from 1974 to 1990. He also had an affair with actress Sophie Aldred, which he documented in his autobiography. He married actress Amanda Holden on 4 June 1995. They had a temporary split in 2000 when Holden's affair with actor Neil Morrissey was exposed in the press, before eventually separating in December 2002 and divorcing in 2003.

Dennis met Claire Nicholson in 2005. They were married on 23 November 2009 in Highgate. The couple have a daughter, born on 24 April 2008, and a son, born on 14 April 2011.

Dennis is a Liverpool F.C. fan.

== Filmography ==
=== Film ===
- Intimate Relations (1996)
- Large (2001)
- Wildlife
- SeaBiscuit

=== Television ===
- The Comedians (1971)
- New Faces (1974) – Contestant/winner
- Russ Abbot's Madhouse (1982)
- The Russ Abbot Show (1982)
- The Laughter Show
- Merseybeat
- Family Affairs
- Casualty
- Crossroads (revival)
- Family Fortunes (1987–2002) – Presenter
- Wyrd Sisters (1997) – The Fool/Tomjon
- Brookside (2001) – Jeff Evans
- Celebrity Big Brother (2002) – Himself
- Engie Benjy (2002–2004) – Pilot Pete and Astronaut Al (voices)
- Extras (2005) – Guest Star as himself
- In the Grid (2006) – Presenter
- The Sound of Musicals (2006) – Presenter and performer
- New Street Law (2006) – Guest star
- The Bill (2006) – Guest star
- Hotel Babylon (2006) – Guest appearance
- Saving Planet Earth (2007)
- TV Now and Then (2007) – Presenter
- Holby City (2007) – Guest star
- Les Dennis's Home Video Heroes (2008) – Narrator
- Les Dennis' Liverpool – Presenter
- Fee Fi Fo Yum (2010)
- Life's Too Short (2011) – Guest appearance
- Midsomer Murders (2013) – 1 episode (series 16 episode 1)
- Celebrity MasterChef (2013) – Contestant
- Coronation Street (2014–2016) – Michael Rodwell (249 episodes)
- Pilgrimage: Road to Rome (2019)
- Harry Hill's Alien Fun Capsule (8 June 2019) – Guest
- Birds of a Feather (2020) – Graeme
- Richard Osman's House of Games (2021) – Contestant
- Would I Lie to You? (2021) – Contestant
- Countdown (2022, 2026) – Guest presenter
- Death in Paradise (2022)
- Celebrity Antiques Road Trip (2022) – Contestant
- The Madame Blanc Mysteries (2023)
- Strictly Come Dancing (2023) – Contestant
- Sister Boniface Mysteries (2024)
- The Weakest Link (2025) – Contestant/winner
