= Marlon Brando's Corset =

Marlon Brando's Corset is a dark comedy play by Guy Jones, which takes a sideswipe at celebrity culture and the obsession with stardom and fame. The play premiered at the 2006 Edinburgh Festival Fringe and embarked on a UK tour thereafter.

== Synopsis ==
The action takes place on the set of a (fictional) long-running TV series called Healing Hands, a medical drama in the vein of BBC's Casualty, and centres around the show's writer, Nick Chase, and his tussles with the show's star Will Swift and director Alex.

== Cast ==
The cast includes Les Dennis, Mike McShane, Jeremy Edwards and Jim Field Smith.

== Production Team ==
- Director: Ed Curtis
- Producer/General Manager: Richard Jordan
- Designer: Morgan Large
- Lighting Designer: James Whiteside
- Sound Designer: Jem Kitchen
- Produced by Ed Curtis Associates, Richard Jordan Productions and Guildford's Yvonne Arnaud Theatre in association with Greenwich Theatre London

== Film ==
The play was to be made into a major motion picture, set for release in 2009.
