= Les Dennis's Home Video Heroes =

2008 British TV series

- Directed by: Ian Illett
- Narrated by: Les Dennis; Stuart Hall
- Country of origin: United Kingdom
- No. of series: 2
- No. of episodes: 60

Production
- Producer: Rob Smith
- Running time: 30 minutes (incl. adverts)
- Production company: Bullseye Productions

Original release
- Network: Challenge
- Release: 23 June – 31 October 2008

Les Dennis's Home Video Heroes is a British television programme, which ran for two series on Challenge in 2008. The first series ran from 23 June to 1 August, and the second ran from 13 to 31 October. It featured humorous clips from home videos. The show was narrated by Les Dennis, with a special "Laugh-o-meter" segment being narrated by Stuart Hall.

The show was repeated on Channel One (until that channel closed in 2011) and Living TV.
