= Fee Fi Fo Yum =

- Genre: Children's game show
- Directed by: Jeanette Goulboum; Richard Turley
- Starring: Les Dennis; Nigel Cooper as Brian the Giant
- Voices of: Brian Blessed (announcer)
- Theme music composer: Indigo Music
- Composer: Dan Selby
- Country of origin: United Kingdom
- Original language: English
- No. of seasons: 2
- No. of episodes: 26

Production
- Producers: Edward Thomas; Annie Dixon

Original release
- Network: BBC One
- Release: 10 September 2010 – 2 September 2011

Fee Fi Fo Yum was a British children's television game show presented by Les Dennis. Two teams of five "humunchies" compete in a series of challenges on the dinner table of Brian the Giant (Nigel Cooper). The losing team is then eaten by the giant. It premiered in 2010 on BBC One's CBBC broadcasting block, and ran for two 13-episode series.

== Format ==
Fee Fi Fo Yum is broadcast on a fictional channel called Giant Television (GTV) and features a number of spoof advertisements for pretend products used by giants. These include "The Guff Muffler" (a device for muffling flatulent giants); "Bot-Buster" (beans for giants who lack the ability to guff); "Grimo" (a stain creating washing powder); "Stinks" (a giant deodorant available in cabbage, dung, cheese and sewage fragrances) and "Nan in a Can" (a canned meat product like Spam, made entirely of old ladies). There were also weather reports from Windy Wendy, GTV's resident weather girl (who is also Brian's crush). Jim Elastic provided giant-sized exercise routines.

Two teams of five children compete in four preliminary rounds to game a time advantage in the final round, "The Great Escape": a physical target game played by two randomly selected players on each team; "Les’s Tasty Challenge", in which each team predicts how many mouthfuls of a mystery meal Les can eat in 30 seconds; a physical puzzle game played by the remaining three players (usually one going into giant soup and the other two solving it) who did not play the first game, again chosen randomly; and finally "Ad Analysis", a buzzer round in which teams answer five questions about what they have seen in and heard from the last two spoof adverts. The winners of the first three rounds win a five-second lifeline. Each correct answer in Ad Analysis is worth a two-second lifeline.

== Games ==
These games will save the winning team by rewarding them 5-second life (2 for every question in Ad Analysis).

=== Fast-food challenges ===
- Chop Chop – Once a Friday night, Brian orders a chow mein from the Chinese take-away, however the take-away accidentally put peas in, and Brian hates peas. So it's their challenge using the chopsticks to place the peas on their team's plate. The chow mein with the most peas on their plate will then win a 5-second life line.
- Feed Me – Brian's favourite food apart from humunchies is sprouts and meatballs. So it's their challenge using the catapults made out of matches and plasters to fire the sprouts and the meatballs into Brian's mouth.(One team feeds meatballs and the other feeds sprouts). Whoever feeds him the most wins a 5 seconds life line.
- Beans on toast – Brian likes beans on toast (so he always farts), so the teams need to catapult beans onto toast with teaspoons attached to matches. The team with the most beans on the toast will win a 5-second life line
- Keep Me Sweet – When Brian watches Fee Fi Fo Yum he loves a great cup of tea, however he loves it sickly sweet (the challenge's motto is the sweeter the brew, the better for you). So it's their challenge using the teaspoons attached to matches to fire the sugar cubes into the cup. The team with the most sugar lumps in their tea (the sweetest tea) will win a 5-second life line.

=== Les' tasty challenge ===
- Brian has sneaked in Les' worst food and Les must eat it up in 30 seconds. Before the challenge both teams have to come up with an answer and one with the closest answer by the time runs out will win the next 5 second life-line.

=== Jigsaw challenges ===
- Lucky Numbers – Brian has a lucky number and wants the humunchies to make it for him. So he's taken out all his fridge magnets and placed them in the lime jelly. 3 humunchies (1 in the bowl, and the other 2 working it out) must scavenge the numbers and place them on the tinfoil in front of them. They can only carry 5 magnets at a time, The 1st team to create correct sum equaling the number the number will win the next 5 second life-line.
- Alphabet soup – Brian likes to play with his food especially alphabet soup to the teams need to take out the letters and put them onto toast, they can only carry 8 letters at a time. The team that makes the longest word will win a 5-second life line.
- Chip of the Old Block – A lonely Brian has made himself little buddies. However, since they're made out of spuds they're called "Spuddies" (each one named "Bob" as a running gag). 1 will choose which part to place whilst in the tomato soup or blanc mange and the other 2 choosing it where it goes. The 1st team to make an identical Spuddy will win the 5 second life-line. Each one is similar to Mr. Potato Head.
- Biccie Break. Before Brian got the chance to try his "Choccie Gob" biscuits during the break, he accidentally spilled it in custard or blanc mange. One humunchie must search for each piece of Choccie Gob (either Milk or White) and pass it to their 2 teammates. The 1st to make their biscuit will win the 5 second life-line.

=== Ad analysis ===
- This will test their memory for this challenge. They must look at 2 gruesome Ads and Les will answer the questions. The first to buzz in will answer the question 1st. Get it right and they win a 2-second life-line. However get it wrong, hesitate or failure to answer, will mean they have to pass it over to the other team, if they make the same mistakes, nobody wins the life-line.

=== The Great Escape ===
Brian doesn't pick anymore; the teams must pick that person for The Great Escape. Brain has locked their teammates in the Scales of justice. Only one Team can free them, but facing them is The Great Escape: five awesome obstacles.

- A tyre-path speed obstacle known as "The Doughnut Dash".
- A tunnel (kitchen roll) filled with meatballs to hinder them known as "The Kitchen Roll Crawl".
- A rolling pin balance beam with Brian swinging 2 teabags on each hand to make it more difficult known as "The Rolling Pin Run".
- A physical and mental challenge building a path to Brian's bowl known as "The Choc-bar Challenge".
- A challenge that once in the bowl, they must ascend a slope to freedom known as "The Slippery Slope to the Rope".

The highest head start is 25 seconds, score 25-0.

The team that makes it to the top of the slope will pull the rope, releasing the victorious team and they will go down the freedom chute. The other team is eaten by Brian as punishment for failing. If both players free their teams, then both of them are the winners and Brian is not happy. However, the round would also end when Brian stops the players, saying he is tired of waiting for a player to free their team so he decides to eat both teams. Les accepts this because Brian is the boss and both teams end up as the losers In 2 Episodes

== Episodes ==
Series 1 of Fee Fi Fo Yum originally aired from 10 September 2010 on BBC One until 3 December 2010, but was also repeated on BBC Two and most notably, CBBC. The show was renewed for a second series which aired from 27 May 2011 until 2 September 2011. Fee Fi Fo Yum was later cancelled and has not been repeated since. Originally, the only remaining footage of the show was two clips available on the official website, although all episodes have since been uploaded in full on YouTube by fans with access to recordings of it.

=== Series 1 (2010) ===
No.	Title	Original air date	Winning team	Losing team
1	"Brian's Birthday"	10 September 2010	The Masterchefs	Kapow!
2	"Brian Has a Problem"	17 September 2010	Team Y Ffin	The Belly Busters
3	"Evacuwax"	24 September 2010	The Giant Five	The Cheesy Meatballs
4	"Clumsy Brian"	1 October 2010	The Tartan Terrors	The Busy Bees
5	"Brian's New Underpants"	8 October 2010	Four Plus One	The Bubbles
6	"Annoying Brian"	15 October 2010	The Staffordshire Stallions	The Highgate Heroes
7	"Slop n Save"	22 October 2010	The Sly Foxes	The Kings
8	"Brian's Toothache"	29 October 2010	The Warwickshire Wizards	The Finchley Fighters
9	"Brian's Got the Munchies"	5 November 2010	The Porthcawl Pirates	The Wimbledon Winners
10	"Guff Muffler"	12 November 2010	The Barnsley Tykes	The Hearts
11	"Brian's Got Dandruff"	19 November 2010	The Undefeated Dragons	The Little Rascals
12	"Feed Me"	26 November 2010	The Gobstoppers	The Haggis Heads
13	"Les Dreams of Escape"	3 December 2010	The Fish Fingers	The Bolts

=== Series 2 (2011) ===
No.	Title	Original air date	Winning team	Losing team
1	"Go Go Giant"	27 May 2011	The Essex Explorers	The Afan Dragons
2	"World Record Attempt"	3 June 2011	The Wembley Wonders	The Fantastic Five
3	"Funny Smell"	10 June 2011	The Brainiacs	The Loopy Leopards
4	"Brian's Famished"	17 June 2011	5 Star	Chesterfield Chestnuts
5	"Hairy Nostrils"	24 June 2011	The Blue Pineapples	Electrify
6	"Brian's Cold"	1 July 2011	Both teams lost	The Giant Crushers and The Victorious Vikings
7	"Hungry Brian"	15 July 2011	The Giant Busters	The Brixton Strikers
8	"Brian's Dream"	22 July 2011	Solutions	The Monster Mashers
9	"The Fly..."	29 July 2011	The Croydon Crew	The Wembley Wolves
10	"Dirty Dishes"	5 August 2011	The Loughborough Legends	The Chameleons
11	"Smelly Breath"	12 August 2011	The Brent Buddies	The Apple Crushers
12	"Brian's Diet"	19 August 2011	Both teams lost	The Switch Survivors and The London Lions
13	Zit Bitzer	26 August 2011	The Shepherd's Bush Smoothies and The Highgate Hotdogs	Both teams won
