= Orchis Fatalis =

- Midsomer Murders episode
- Episode no.: Season 8 Episode 3
- Directed by: Peter Smith
- Written by: Terry Hodgkinson
- Original air date: 9 January 2005

Guest appearances
- Harriet Walter (Margaret Winstanley); Matt Bardock (Harry Rose); John Nettleton (Munro Hilliard); Geoffrey Chater (Brother Robert); Sai Kit-Yung (Jimmy Fong)

Episode chronology
← Previous "Dead in the Water"	Next → "Bantling Boy"

"Orchis Fatalis" is the third episode of the eighth season of British television show Midsomer Murders and the thirty-eighth episode overall. It stars John Nettles as Detective Chief Inspector Tom Barnaby and John Hopkins as Detective Sergeant Dan Scott. It concerns the discovery of a very rare orchid, the yellow roth, and a number of murders seemingly committed in an attempt to acquire it.
