= The Christmas Haunting =

- Midsomer Murders episode
- Episode no.: Season 16; Episode 1
- Directed by: Nick Laughland
- Written by: Chris Murray
- Original air date: 24 December 2013

Episode chronology
← Previous "Schooled in Murder"	Next → "Let Us Prey"

"The Christmas Haunting" is the first episode in the sixteenth series of Midsomer Murders. The episode aired on Christmas Eve 2013. This series starred DCI John Barnaby. Barnaby was accompanied by new Detective Sergeant Charlie Nelson. In overnight figures, the episode suffered a dip, dropping to 3.66 million viewers, with an audience share of 15.7%. When the episode was repeated on ITV+1 a further 401,300 viewers tuned in, receiving an audience share of 1.8%. The consolidated figure reached 4.92 million viewers.

== Cast ==
- DCI John Barnaby — Neil Dudgeon
- DS Charlie Nelson — Gwilym Lee
- Dr. Kate Wilding — Tamzin Malleson
- Sarah Barnaby — Fiona Dolman
- Simon Fergus-Johnson — Mark Heap
- Tabby Fergus-Johnson — Nadia Cameron-Blakely
- Pippa Fergus-Johnson — Hannah Tointon
- Valerie Fergus-Johnson — Emily Joyce
- Ollie Tabori — James Murray
- Brendan Pearce — Les Dennis
- Libs Pearce — Elizabeth Berrington
- Mel Bridgeman — Susie Trayling
- Conor Bridgeman — Jonah Russell
- Felicity Hearn — Perdita Avery
- Dev Kardeck — Nikesh Patel
- Ross Clymer — Paul Blair

== Plot ==
As Christmas descends Midsomer Morton Shallows, a new Detective Sergeant arrives, in the name of Charlie Nelson. However, unrest soon breaks out as local furniture maker and serial philanderer Conor Bridgeman is stabbed to death with an antique sword during a ghost-hunting party. The owner of the house, Simon Fergus-Johnson and the rest of his family are astonished when they discover their new venture has gone horrifically wrong. Brendan Pearce, a local historian, is quick to accuse the blacksmith's daughter, Rose Wilton. But there's just one problem; Rose is a ghost...

Conor's widow Mel is stunned to learn he was cheating on her with her singing teacher, Felicity Hearn. More secrets are spilled when it appears Conor had attempted to negotiate with Fergus to buy the haunted manor, but the discussion was fractious. Beliefs continue to lure in the air when Ross Clymer, landlord of local pub Blacksmith Arms, brands his pub as an "original haunted site". There's also a recording of the night Conor died, with a ghost-like girl's voice in the background.

Simon's wife Tabby keeps close contact with Ross. Brendan has high hopes that Conor's death will boost the café and shop he runs with wife Libs. Valerie Fergus-Johnson gets in contact with Barnaby, and tells him that she was her father's carer from the age of thirteen, and that Simon had toured the world before inheriting the manor. Simon and Tabby row as the manor lies in disorder, ignoring daughter Pippa. Pippa decides to wander off, going in search for Dev Kardek, a student obsessed in the paranormal. When she finds him he seems busy writing his PhD.

Mel visits Felicity, while Barnaby discovers Brendan's fixation over village matters began after Conor broke his daughter's heart - resulting in her leaving home. Despite the motives in place, Brendan denies murdering Conor.

Army major Ollie Tabori returns to the village of Morton Shallows, and instantly searches for Valerie. When Ollie arrives in the pub, Ross is furious and chucks him out. Pippa and Dev plan a vigil regarding part of their studies. As night dawns, the pub is in lock-down where Ross prepares to search for the ghost in his pub. He is joined by several residents. Nelson stands by as the lights are switched off and the hunt begins. He sees something and head off to investigate, trapping Felicity who is playing the tape of the ghostly girl's voice. As the lights are switched back on and the residents gather, they realise Ross is missing. He's been bludgeoned to death with a blacksmith's hammer.

Nelson later discovers that Ollie is in fact Mel's brother, and was once Valerie's lover. He also discovers Ollie was sent off after causing an accident. However, Ollie never did cause the accident as the real culprits were Conor and Ross. Ollie then went AWOL from the army, suffering posttraumatic stress disorder (PTSD). Is Ollie actually seeking revenge? Brendan disappears, but he's taken cash with him.

Nelson learns Dev tricked Pippa, as his PhD is truly about paranormal gullibility. Suddenly the mystery pieces together and Barnaby and Nelson realise who's really behind these killings. They rush towards supposedly-haunted caves, where Pippa plans a live transmission to mark the one-hundred-and-twenty-seventh anniversary of Rose. But will they arrive in time? Or will the killer strike a third time?

== Murders ==
- Conor Bridgeman — stabbed to death with antique sword.
- Ross Clymer — bludgeoned to death with blacksmith's hammer.

Both were killed by Pippa Fergus-Johnson.
