= Destroying Angel (Midsomer Murders) =

- Midsomer Murders episode
- Episode no.: Season 4 Episode 2
- Directed by: David Tucker
- Written by: David Hoskins
- Original air date: 26 August 2001

Episode chronology
← Previous "Garden of Death"	Next → "Electric Vendetta"

"Destroying Angel" is the second episode of the fourth series of Midsomer Murders and the fifteenth episode overall. It stars John Nettles as Detective Chief Inspector Tom Barnaby and Daniel Casey as Detective Sergeant Gavin Troy.

== Plot ==
The will of late hotelier Karl Wainright causes ructions amongst his staff, and soon a serial murderer begins hunting down the beneficiaries, dispatching them in increasingly gruesome and imaginative ways. Meanwhile, Barnaby and Troy discover the bizarre village tradition of exposing dark secrets - through cryptic Punch and Judy shows.

== Murder methods ==
- Smothering
- Arrow shot and dismemberment
- Poisoning by the eponymous species of mushroom
- Crushed by cabinet
- Shotgun blast
