= Electric Vendetta =

- Midsomer Murders episode
- Episode no.: Season 4 Episode 3
- Directed by: Peter Smith
- Written by: Terry Hodgkinson
- Original air date: 2 September 2001

Guest appearances
- John Woodvine (Sir Harry Chatwyn); Ursula Howells (Lady Isabel Aubrey); Amanda Mealing (Sally Boulter); Alec McCowen (Sir Christian Aubrey); Kenneth Colley (Lloyd Kirby); Patrick Baladi (Steve Ramsey); Donald Gee (Reverend Mr Ellis); Charmian May (Marian Leonard); Michael Bertenshaw (Michael Rycroft)

Episode chronology
← Previous "Destroying Angel"	Next → "Who Killed Cock Robin?"

"Electric Vendetta" is the third episode of the fourth season of Midsomer Murders and the sixteenth episode overall. It stars John Nettles as Detective Chief Inspector Tom Barnaby and Daniel Casey as Detective Sergeant Gavin Troy, where in a long-held grudge of forty years triggers a series of deaths disguised as alien abductions.

The episode is notable for the fact that one of the deaths is not adequately explained in the denouement due to a mistake in the editing process. A repeat showing of the episode in daytime hours was determined by regulator Ofcom to have breached broadcast regulations, according to The Guardian because of "too much murder".

== Plot ==
The episode involves crop circles. A man is found in the middle of one such circle, naked, with two puncture wounds on his back and the back of his head shaved. A local Ufologist claims extra terrestrial involvement but DCI Tom Barnaby looks for a more plausible explanation.

When a series of bodies are found in mysterious crop circles in the cornfields of Sir Harry Chatwyn, squire of the village of Midsomer Parva, it looks like a case of extra terrestrial kidnapping. Two bodies, bearing the classic hallmarks of alien abduction – burnt fingers, a puncture wound to the lower back and a chunk cut out of the hair - seem to provide evidence that UFOs do exist.

Inspector Barnaby and Sergeant Troy investigate a series of deaths in a Midsomer village, which are ultimately revealed to be murders connected to personal motives.

== The deaths ==
1. Ronald Stokes - accidentally electrocuted himself
2. Eddie Field - electrocuted at foundry. His death was never adequately explained in the episode. Producers later revealed the explanation had been forgotten in editing.
3. Steve Ramsey - murdered by electrocution
4. Lloyd Kirby - thrown down stairs. Body dumped in a crop circle by Dave and Sally.
5. Lady Isabel Aubrey - natural causes (She was still alive the last time seen by the audience, as the heart monitor did not flatline.)
6. Dave Rippert - killed in accidental head-on collision with a combine harvester seen earlier
