= Douglas Watkinson =

English crime writer

Douglas Watkinson is an English novelist, playwright and screenwriter, specializing in crime and mystery. His books feature the hard-bitten, soft-centred Nathan Hawk, a police officer who was 'required to retire' and now works as a private detective. Known for his wit and fiery temper, Hawk is on his seventh case. The first six books are entitled Haggard Hawk, Easy Prey, Scattered Remains, Evil Turn, Jericho Road, and White Crane.

== Career ==
Watkinson has written hundreds of scripts for television, contributing to Lovejoy, Boon, Juliet Bravo, Agatha Christie's Poirot and Midsomer Murders. He also wrote the daytime drama For Maddie with Love. In 1984 he created the short-lived sitcom The New Statesman starring Windsor Davies. He has written four stage plays: Let's Do It My Way, Caesar and Me, The Dragon's Tail and The Wall

== Background and personal life ==
Watkinson was born into an army family and his father served throughout World War II and beyond. He was killed in Palestine by The Stern Gang in 1947. His death is the inspiration for Watkinson's play The Wall, in which a middle aged man visits a military cemetery in Ramleh, Israel and meets a young British soldier who turns out to be his father. Educated at Haberdashers' Aske's, Watkinson later attended East 15 Acting School, where his first plays were performed.

== Writing ==
Watkinson began his career writing the backs of record sleeves for Decca and at the same time he bombarded television companies with plays. The first to be produced was a thirty-minute two-hander called Click, starring Ray Brooks and John Paul. Since then, he has never been out of work. He was the script writer for several BBC series, most notably Z-Cars, Howard's Way and The Brothers. His favourite work has been Midsomer Murders, Boon (for which he wrote the establishing episode), Lovejoy, Forever Green and Maybury (which was Kenneth Branagh's first on-screen appearance).
