= David Taylor (veterinary surgeon) =

British veterinary surgeon (1934–2013)

- Born: David Conrad Taylor; 11 February 1934; Rochdale, Lancashire, England
- Died: 29 January 2013 (aged 78)
- Occupation(s): Veterinarian, author, television presenter

David Conrad Taylor, BVMS, FRCVS, FZS (11 February 1934 – 29 January 2013), was a British veterinary surgeon. He was the first veterinary surgeon to specialise in zoo and wildlife medicine. Taylor worked with zoo and wild animals from 1957, acting as a consultant on the treatment of some of the rarest species on Earth. He was an expert in marine mammal medicine. From 1968, he was the vet in charge of Cuddles, the first captive orca to be kept in the UK, at Flamingo Park, North Yorkshire.

== Life and career ==
Taylor was born in Rochdale, Lancashire, and qualified at the University of Glasgow School of Veterinary Medicine in 1956. He attended the inaugural meeting of the Federation of British Zoos in 1967 which was held at the Zoological Society of London.

He was awarded the first RCVS Fellowship for a wild animal topic (diseases of primates) in 1968, and was recognised as an RCVS specialist in zoo and wildlife medicine, areas to which he made significant contributions. He was the first user of the dart gun in the UK.

Taylor worked for zoos across the world. These include Chester Zoo, London Zoo, Chessington Zoo, the now closed Belle Vue Zoological Gardens in Manchester, Flamingo Park Zoo in North Yorkshire, Windsor Safari Park, Parc Astérix near Paris, Marine Land, South of France and Madrid Zoo. He has also worked for some of the most famous circuses in the world.

In 1976 he founded the International Zoo Veterinary Group (IZVG) with his partner Andrew Greenwood and the Dinnes Memorial Veterinary Centre in Santa Clarita, California. Today, the IZVG is one of the largest and best-known independent zoological veterinary practices in the world.

In March 2008, Taylor retired from the International Zoo Veterinary Practice, though he still acted as a consultant and continued to be a prolific writer until his death.

== One by One ==
In the mid-1970s and early 1980s, Taylor wrote a popular series of autobiographical books that charted his life and experiences as a "Zoo Vet". These books were adapted for Television in a drama series, One by One. The BBC made three series and 32 episodes of One By One, broadcast between 1984 and 1987. It was set in the 1950s, with Dudley Zoo doubling as the Great Northern Zoo, and followed the career of Don Turner, based on Taylor himself, as he established himself as wildlife vet. Don Turner was played by Rob Heyland and James Ellis played head keeper Paddy Reilly. Other actors who appeared in the series included Peter Jeffrey, Peter Gilmore and Catherine Schell.

== No. 73 ==
Between 1983 and 1988, Taylor made regular appearances on the Saturday morning children's show No. 73. He brought all sorts of exotic animals to the show and would usually be interviewed in these segments by Andrea Arnold. Arnold's character, "Dawn", supposedly worked at Taylor's veterinary surgery for a while. Taylor held several competitions on No. 73, including one in 1987 in which the winner went on a trip to a Madrid Zoo accompanied by himself and "Dawn". In 1984–1985 Taylor and Arnold presented their own programme on Children's ITV, Talking Animal, in which each episode focused on one animal.

== Autobiographical books ==
- Zoo Vet: World of a Wildlife Vet (1976) ISBN 0-04-925012-4, ISBN 978-0-04-925012-3
- Zoo Vet: Adventures of a Wild Animal Doctor (1977) ISBN 0-397-01207-1, ISBN 978-0-397-01207-7
- Is There a Doctor in the Zoo? (1978) ISBN 0-397-01284-5, ISBN 978-0-397-01284-8
- Going Wild: More Adventures of a Zoo Vet (1980) ISBN 0-04-925019-1, ISBN 978-0-04-925019-2
- Next panda, please!: Further adventures of a wildlife vet (1982) ISBN 0-04-925021-3, ISBN 978-0-04-925021-5
- Wandering Whale and Other Adventures from a Zoo Vet's Casebook (1984) ISBN 0-04-925023-X, ISBN 978-0-04-925023-9
- One by One – The world of a wildlife vet. (1984) ISBN 0-04-925031-0
- Doctor in the Zoo: Making of a Zoo Vet (1985) ISBN 0-7451-0145-3, ISBN 978-0-7451-0145-3
- Dragon Doctor: Further Adventures from a Zoo Vet's Cases (1986) ISBN 0-04-925032-9, ISBN 978-0-04-925032-1
- Vet on the Wild Side: Further Adventures of a Wildlife Vet (1991) ISBN 0-312-05529-3, ISBN 978-0-312-05529-5
- The Patient Elephant: more exotic cases from the world's top wildlife vet (1993) ISBN 0-86051-835-3, ISBN 978-0-86051-835-8
- Vet on the Wild Side (1998) ISBN 0-86051-660-1, ISBN 978-0-86051-660-6

== Other books ==
- The Secret Life of Dogs (2007) ISBN 0-00-724476-2, ISBN 978-0-00-724476-8
- The Secret Life of Cats (2007) ISBN 0-00-724475-4, ISBN 978-0-00-724475-1
- The Secret Life of Kittens (2008) ISBN 0-00-726360-0, ISBN 978-0-00-726360-8
- Collins Family Pet Guide – Rabbit (1999) ISBN 0-00-413377-3, ISBN 978-0-00-413377-5
- Collins Small Pet Handbook: Looking after rabbits, hamsters, guinea pigs, gerbils mice and rats (2002) ISBN 0-00-713448-7, ISBN 978-0-00-713448-9
- Rabbit Handbook: A Family Guide to Buying (1999) ISBN 0-8069-7807-4, ISBN 978-0-8069-7807-9
- Kitten Taming: The Fast Route to a Controllable Cat (2009) ISBN 0-600-61831-5, ISBN 978-0-600-61831-7
- Dogs (DK Pockets) (2003) ISBN 0-7894-9591-0, ISBN 978-0-7894-9591-4
- The Ultimate Dog Book (1990) ISBN 0-86318-443-X, ISBN 978-0-86318-443-7
- You and Your Cat (1997) ISBN 0-7513-0272-4, ISBN 978-0-7513-0272-1
- Your Dog's IQ: How Clever Is Your Canine? (2009) ISBN 1-59223-987-0, ISBN 978-1-59223-987-0
- The Little Tabby Cat Book (1990) ISBN 0-86318-454-5, ISBN 978-0-86318-454-3
- My Dog is a Genius: Understand and Improve Your Dog's Intelligence (2008) ISBN 0-600-61655-X, ISBN 978-0-600-61655-9
- Collins Pony Handbook (2002) ISBN 0-00-712092-3, ISBN 978-0-00-712092-5
- Old Dog, New Tricks: Understanding and Retraining Older and Rescued Dogs (2006)ISBN 1-55407-197-6, ISBN 978-1-55407-197-5
