= Have Your Cake and Eat It =

British television series

- Genre: Romantic drama
- Created by: Rob Heyland
- Written by: Rob Heyland
- Directed by: Paul Seed
- Starring: Sinéad Cusack; Miles Anderson; Holly Aird; Paul Brooke; David de Keyser; Ian McNeice; James Purefoy; Guy Faulkner; Honeysuckle Weeks; Max Dawson; Jay Barrymore; Holly Oppe; Imogen Oppe; Sally Dexter; James Bolam; Rebecca Front; Kate Blackham
- Composer: Jeremy Sams
- Country of origin: United Kingdom
- Original language: English
- No. of series: 1
- No. of episodes: 4

Production
- Executive producer: Michael Wearing
- Producers: Dave Edwards; Eileen Quinn
- Production locations: Chertsey, Surrey, England, UK; Vila-seca, Catalonia, Spain
- Cinematography: Graham Frake
- Running time: 50 minutes
- Production companies: Initial Film and Television

Original release
- Network: BBC1
- Release: 15 March – 23 March 1997

Have Your Cake and Eat It is a British four-part romantic drama which was broadcast every Saturday and Sunday on BBC1 from 15 to 23 March 1997. The four-episode series was directed by Paul Seed and co-produced by Dave Edwards and Eileen Quinn. The show starred Miles Anderson as Sam Dawson, a middle-aged executive in the roller coaster industry. The plot follows Sam Dawson's affair with a younger woman, Allie Grey (Holly Aird), and the impact on his marriage with Charlotte Dawson (Sinéad Cusack). The series simultaneously followed the affair and Sam’s professional pursuit of building a roller coaster called "Dragon Khan." The series co-starred Paul Brooke, David de Keyser, Ian McNeice, and James Purefoy. It was conceived by actor and television writer Rob Heyland, writer of Between the Lines and Wycliffe.

== Cast ==
- Sinéad Cusack as Charlotte Dawson
- Miles Anderson as Sam Dawson
- Holly Aird as Allie Gray
- Paul Brooke as Stimpson
- David de Keyser as Michael
- Ian McNeice as Zief
- James Purefoy as Ben
- Guy Faulkner as Stephen Dawson
- Honeysuckle Weeks as Sophie Dawson
- Jay Barrymore as Max Dawson
- Holly Oppe as Polly Dawson
- Imogen Oppe as Molly Dawson
- Sally Dexter as Diane
- James Bolam as Nat Oliver
- Rebecca Front as Claire Gray
- Kate Blackham as Doreen
- Philip Glenister as Joe Martin
- Paul Mateu as Carlos
- Wolf Kahler as Gunther
- Toby Harper as Jose Maria

== Episodes ==
No.	Title	Directed by	Written by	Original release date
1	"Episode 1"	Rob Heyland	Paul Seed	15 March 1997
Sam Dawson has an affair while on a business trip, but his wife is closer than he realises.
2	"Episode 2"	Rob Heyland	Paul Seed	16 March 1997
As construction begins in Spain on Sam's dream rollercoaster, Allie decides she cannot continue their affair. At home, Sam's wife Charlotte cannot understand his black mood but soon learns the truth.
3	"Episode 3"	Rob Heyland	Paul Seed	22 March 1997
Charlotte and Sam struggle to save their marriage, but when they eventually separate, Sam returns to Allie.
4	"Episode 4"	Rob Heyland	Paul Seed	23 March 1997
The Dragon Khan roller coaster nears completion just as Allie's baby makes an early appearance. Sam is now "having his cake", shared by Charlotte and Allie, but can this situation last?

== Awards and nominations ==
Sinead Cusack won the Royal Television Society Award for Best Actress in 1998, while Miranda Richardson also received a nomination in the same category.
