= Paul Brooke =

British actor (born 1944)

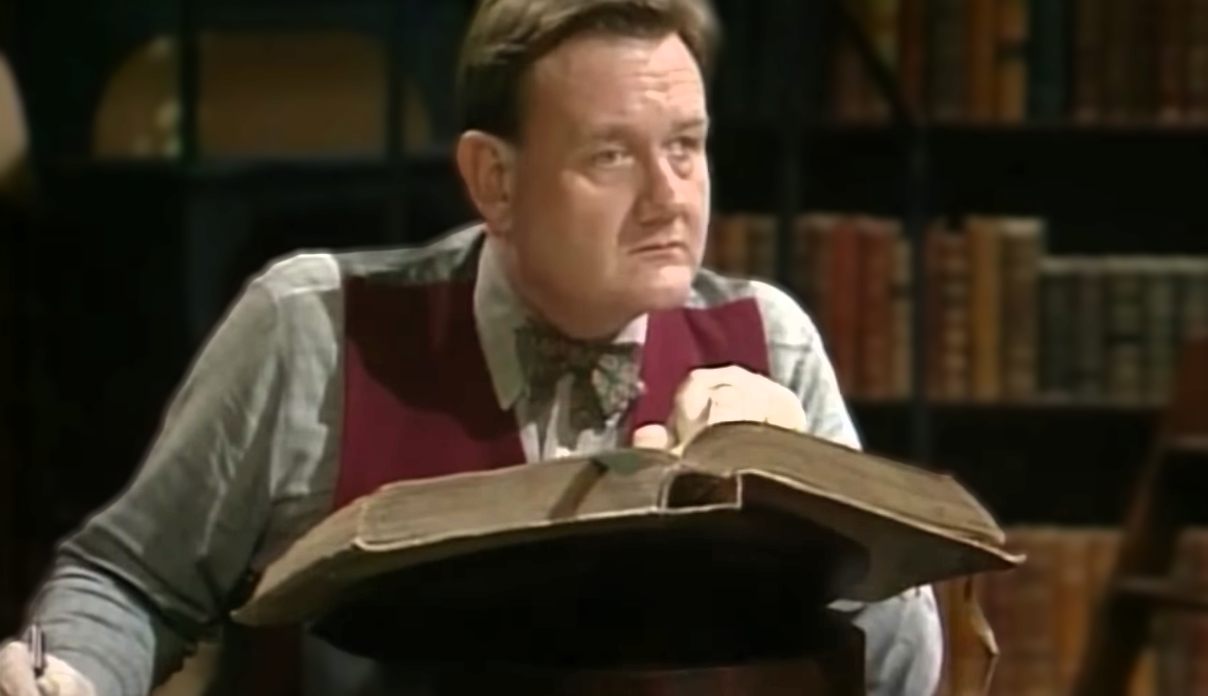
- Brooke in an unaired sketch from Mr. Bean
- Born: 22 November 1944 (age 81); London, England
- Occupation: Actor
- Years active: 1969–2009
- Children: Tom Brooke
- Relatives: Fiona Glascott (daughter-in-law)

Paul Brooke (born 22 November 1944) is an English retired actor. He made his film debut in 1972 in the Hammer film Straight on till Morning, followed by performances in For Your Eyes Only (1981), Return of the Jedi (1983), Scandal (1989), Saving Grace (2000), Bridget Jones's Diary (2001), Alfie (2004), The Phantom of the Opera (2004) and Oliver Twist (2005). Brooke is the father of actor Tom Brooke.

== Career ==
Brooke began as a stage actor and has played in many London productions, including several years as a member of Frank Dunlop's original Young Vic Company. He played Malakili the Rancor Keeper in the 1983 Star Wars film Return of the Jedi (his voiced dubbed over by Ernie Fosselius). He played British Conservative politician Ian Gow in the 2004 BBC series The Alan Clark Diaries. In 2006, he guest starred in the Doctor Who audio adventure Year of the Pig as well as the 1990 Mr. Bean sketch "The Library". He played Mr. Fitzherbert in the 2001 film Bridget Jones's Diary.

Other appearances in television dramas and comedies featuring Brooke include All Creatures Great and Small, The Blackadder, Bertie and Elizabeth, the BBC adaptation of Blott on the Landscape, Lovejoy, Foyle's War, Rab C. Nesbitt, Kavanagh QC, Sharpe's Revenge, Midsomer Murders, Hustle, Covington Cross, The Kit Curran Radio Show, Between the Lines, Relic Hunter and Mornin' Sarge. He appeared in the miniseries Nostromo in 1997.

He played Gríma Wormtongue in the 1981 BBC radio adaptation of The Lord of the Rings.

He, Linal Haft and Frank Mills are the only actors to appear in both the classic and returning series of Minder, but playing different roles in each.

== Filmography ==
=== Film ===
Year	Title	Role
1972	Straight On till Morning	Uneasy man (uncredited)
1979	Agatha	John Foster
1981	For Your Eyes Only	Bunky
1983	Star Wars Episode VI: Return of the Jedi	Malakili - Rancor Keeper (uncredited)
1984	Greystoke: The Legend of Tarzan, Lord of the Apes	The Rev. Stimson
1985	Revolution	Lord Darling
1988	The Lair of the White Worm	P.C. Erny
1989	Scandal	John, Detective Sgt
1989	A Dry White Season	Dr. Herzog
1989	The Kitchen Child (short)	Undetermined role
1990	The Fool	Lord Paramount
1993	Splitting Heirs	Tour Guide
1993	The Trial	Deputy Bank Manager
1993	Genghis Cohn	Hans-Dieter Pohl
1999	The Messenger: The Story of Joan of Arc	Domremy's Priest
1999	Lighthouse	Captain Campbell
2000	Saving Grace	Charlie
2000	Il cielo cade (The Sky is Falling)	Mr. Pitt
2001	Bridget Jones's Diary	Mr. Fitzherbert
2001	The Affair of the Necklace	Monsieur Bohmer
2004	Alfie	Flower Shop Proprietor
2004	The Phantom of the Opera	Auctioneer
2005	Oliver Twist	Mr Grimwig
2005	Still Life (short)	Auctioneer
2008	The Edge of Love	Mr. Judge Singleton

=== Television ===
Year	Title	Role	Notes
1969	The Wednesday Play	Farquhar	"The Last Train through Harecastle Tunnel"
1970	Daniel Deronda	Mr. Mackworth	Miniseries (2 episodes)
1972	Joseph and the Amazing Technicolor Dreamcoat	Reuben	Young Vic production TV broadcast
1978	The Comedy of Errors	Angelo	TV film
1980	The Other 'Arf	Smidger	"Open to the Public" (S1E5)
1980	Metal Mickey	Harry	"Taking the Mickey" (S1E4)
1980	Play for Today	Mornington	"Minor Complications" (S11E5)
1981	BBC Television Shakespeare	Lavache	"All's Well That Ends Well"
1981	The History Man	Henry Beamish	Series 1 (4 episodes)
1981	The Olympian Way	Trevor Watt	Series 1 (4 episodes)
1981	World's End	Lord Arvin	Series 1 (8 episodes)
1982	Shine on Harvey Moon	Doctor Thrush	"In Sickness and in Health" (S2E3)
1983	Phantom of the Opera	Inspector	TV film
1983	Blackadder	Friar Bellows	"The Black Seal" (S1E6)
1983	The Mad Death	Bob Nicol	Miniseries (3 episodes)
1983	Jemima Shore Investigates	Acton Tindall	"The Damask Collection" (S1E11)
1983	Reilly, Ace of Spies	Granier	"Anna" (S1E4)
1984	Minder	Hamster	"High Drains Pilferer" (S4E3)
1984–86	The Kit Curran Radio Show	Les Toms	Series 1–2 (main role, 12 episodes)
1985	Hitler's SS: Portrait in Evil	Gen. Josef Biegler, SA	TV film
1985	Blott on the Landscape	Hoskins	Series 1 (main role, 6 episodes)
1985	Hommage à Rossini	Signor Gioachino Rossini	TV film
1985	Girls on Top	Lawrence	"C.O.D." (S1E3)
1986	King and Castle	Edward Halliday-Mostyn	Series 1 (4 episodes)
1986	Bergerac	Malcolm Croxted	"Fires in the Fall" (S4E10)
1987	Still Crazy Like a Fox	Constable	TV film
1987	Napoleon and Josephine: A Love Story	Junot	Miniseries (3 episodes)
1988	The Modern World: Ten Great Writers	Dr. Hofrat Behrens	Miniseries (1 episode)
1988	After Henry	Paul	"The Birthday" (S1E6)
1988	The StoryTeller	Chancellor	"The Luck Child" (S1E4)
1988	Number 27	Karmel	TV film
1989–90	The Justice Game	Alistair Sinclair Murray	Series 1–2 (5 episodes)
1989	Mornin' Sarge	Sarge	Series 1 (main role, 7 episodes)
1989	Somewhere to Run	Abrahams	TV film
1989	Anything More Would Be Greedy	Mr. Leadweller	Miniseries (3 episodes)
1989	Saracen	Charles Lighthill	"Infidels" (S1E2)
1989	About Face	Howell	"Send Her Victorious" (S1E5)
1989	Screen One	Lilliwhite	"The Mountain and the Molehill” (S1E6)
1990	Campion	Mr. Parrott	"Sweet Danger" (2 parts, S1E1/2)
1990–91	El C.I.D.	James Henley Dodd	Series 1–2 (5 episodes)
1990	All Creatures Great and Small	Captain Crawford	"A Grand Memory for Forgetting" (S7E9)
1990	Mr. Bean	Reader in Library	"The Library" (unaired sketch)
1991	Screen One	Feature Writer	"Hancock" (S1E2)
1991	Children of the North	Ballister	Series 1 (4 episodes)
1991	Stay Lucky	Simon Owen	"An Unsavoury Business" (S3E4)
1992	Screen One	Martin Poyser	"Adam Bede" (S3E9)
1992	Lovejoy	Gently Bentley	"Scotch on the Rocks" (S3E7)
1992	Love Hurts	Bryan Appleford	Series 1 (3 episodes)
1992	A Masculine Ending	Humphrey Morris	TV film
1992	Mr. Wakefield's Crusade	Doctor	(S1E2)
1992	Covington Cross	Friar	Season 1 (9 episodes)
1992	De terre et de sang (Blood and Dust)	Simon	TV film
1993	The Young Indiana Jones Chronicles	Policeman #1	"Paris, October 1916" (S2E16)
1993	The Inspector Alleyn Mysteries	Abel Pomeroy	"Death at the Bar" (S1E5)
1993	Rab C. Nesbitt	Prison Governor	"Right" (S3E5)
1994	In Suspicious Circumstances	Doctor Holmes	"The Next Mrs. Clements" (S4E5)
1994	Nice Day at the Office	Victor Fenwicke	"The Enemy Within" (S1S3)
1994	Between the Lines	Eddington	"A Safe Pair of Hands" (S3E2)
1994	Dandelion Dead	Arthur	Miniseries (2 episodes)
1995	Joking Apart	Dr. Strickland	(S2E2)
1995	Ghosts	Dr. Brandon	"Shadowy Third" (S1E4)
1995	Ain't Misbehavin'	Chuck Purvis	Series 2 (main role, 6 episodes)
1995	Oliver's Travels	Rowley	Miniseries (1 episode)
1996	Annie's Bar	Vernon Du Chine	Series 1 (main role, 10 episodes)
1996	The Moonstone	Dr. Candy	TV film
1996–97	Nostromo	Capt. Mitchell	Miniseries (4 episodes)
1997	Chalk	Max	"The Interview" (S1E2)
1997	Have Your Cake and Eat It	Stimpson	Miniseries (2 episodes)
1997	Kavanagh QC	Richard Dynevor	"Diplomatic Baggage" (S3E4)
1997	Sharpe	Roland	"Sharpe's Revenge" (S5E1)
1997	A Dance to the Music of Time	Maclintick	Miniseries (1 episode)
1998	Heat of the Sun	Sir Rex Willoughby	Miniseries (2 episodes)
1998	The Life and Crimes of William Palmer	Attorney General	Miniseries (1 episode)
1998	The Scold's Bridle	Duncan Orloff	Miniseries (2 episodes)
1998	Midsomer Murders	Nigel Anderson	"Faithful unto Death" (S1E4)
1998	The Unknown Soldier	Urquart	Miniseries (1 episode)
1998	Dalziel and Pascoe	Canon Eustace Horncastle	"Bones and Silence" (S3E3)
1999	The Last Salute	Mr. Pimm	"Bank Holiday" (S2E2)
2000	Relic Hunter	Chef Gerard La Grange	"Nothing But the Truth" (S1E21)
2000	The Prince and the Pauper	Magistrate	TV film
2001	Doc Martin	Charley	TV film
2002	Bertie and Elizabeth	Tommy Lascelles	TV film
2002	Foyle's War	Arthur Ellis	"The White Feather" (S1E2)
2003	Leonardo	Abbot	Miniseries (1 episode)
2003	Doc Martin and the Legend of the Cloutie	Charley	TV film
2004	The Alan Clark Diaries	Ian Gow	Series 1 (3 episodes)
2004–06	The Worst Week of My Life	Vicar	Series 1 & 3 (4 episodes)
2004	My Dad's the Prime Minister	Sir Fabian Flood	"Diaries" (S2E6)
2005	Hustle	Benny	"Eye of the Beholder" (S2E6)
2005	The Bill	Richard Foster	Series 21 (2 episodes)
2005	Summer Solstice	Derek	TV film
2007	A Class Apart	Godfrey	TV film
2007	My Family	Mr. Salem	"Ho Ho No" (Christmas special)
2008	Agatha Christie's Marple	Billingsley	"A Pocket Full of Rye" (S4E1)
2008	Einstein and Eddington	H H Turner	TV film
2009	Minder	Dickie Mint	Series 11 (3 episodes)
2009	The Royal	Dr. Marsden	"Counting Chickens" (S8E2)
