= One by One (TV series) =

- Genre: Drama
- Created by: Anthony Read
- Starring: Rob Heyland; James Ellis; Sonia Graham
- Country of origin: United Kingdom
- Original language: English
- No. of series: 3
- No. of episodes: 32

Production
- Producer: Bill Sellars
- Running time: 50 minutes
- Production company: BBC

Original release
- Network: BBC1
- Release: 29 January 1984 – 2 May 1987

One by One is a British television series made by the BBC and originally shown between 29 January 1984 and 2 May 1987.

The series, created by Anthony Read, was based on the early life and writings of international veterinary surgeon David Taylor. Called Donald Turner in the series, the show follows his work caring for exotic animals at zoos in Britain, from the 1950s to the 1970s. Each series was set during a different decade, with exteriors filmed at Dudley Zoo, Chester Zoo and Knowsley Safari Park.

Thirty-two episodes were made over three series, transmitted on BBC1 in the early parts of 1984, 1985 and 1987. BBC1 repeated series 2 during the early months of 1986, as no new series had been made that year. The third series was also repeated on BBC1 over the Spring & Summer of 1988.

In Australia, all three series were shown on ABC Television between 1984 and 1988.

== Cast ==
- Rob Heyland – Donald Turner
- James Ellis – Paddy Reilly
- Sonia Graham – Ethel Leadbetter
- Peter Jeffrey – Maurice Webb (Series 1–2)
- Heather James – Maggie Raymond (Series 1–2)
- Liz Smith – Gran Turner (Series 1)
- Garfield Morgan – Howard Rundle (Series 1)
- Rosie Kerslake – Jenny Blount (Series 1)
- Jack Hedley – Peter Raymond (Series 1)
- Peter Gilmore – Ben Bishop (Series 2)
- Catherine Schell – Lady Ann Pendle (Series 2)
- Andrew Robertson – Jock Drummond (Series 3)
- Christina Nagy – Liz Collier (Series 3)
- Tenniel Evans – Teddy Haslam (Series 3)
- Clifford Rose – Challon (Series 1 and 3)

== Series overview ==
Series	Episodes	Originally released	
Series	Episodes	First released	Last released
1	10	8 January 1984	1 April 1984
2	12	13 January 1985	23 May 1985
3	10	19 February 1987	2 May 1987

== Episodes ==
=== Series 1 ===
No.	Title	Directed by	Written by	Original release date
1	"We Called in the Experts"	Christopher Baker	Anthony Read	29 January 1984
2	"Nature's Great Masterpiece"	Christopher Baker	Anthony Read	5 February 1984
3	"They Shoot Tigers in India"	Richard Bramall	Anthony Read	12 February 1984
4	"Silver Linings"	Richard Bramall	Anthony Read	19 February 1984
5	"Pastures New"	Christopher Baker	Anthony Read	26 February 1984
6	"Time and Motion"	Christopher Baker	Anthony Read	4 March 1984
7	"A Long Weekend"	Richard Bramall	Anthony Read	11 March 1984
8	"Doctor's Orders"	Richard Bramall	Anthony Read	18 March 1984
9	"The Woman's Touch"	Christopher Baker	Anthony Read	25 March 1984
10	"Ends and Beginnings"	Christopher Baker	Anthony Read	1 April 1984

=== Series 2 ===
No.	Title	Directed by	Written by	Original release date
11	"Blood, Toil, Tears and Spit"	Michael E. Briant	Anthony Read	5 January 1985
12	"Parting of the Ways"	Michael E. Briant	Anthony Read	12 January 1985
13	"Of Babes and Sucklings"	Richard Bramall	Johnny Byrne	19 January 1985
14	"To Hear the Sea Maid's Music"	Richard Bramall	Johnny Byrne	26 January 1985
15	"End of an Era"	Michael E. Briant	Johnny Byrne	2 February 1985
16	"You and Whose Army?"	Michael E. Briant	Johnny Byrne	9 February 1985
17	"Pride of Place"	Richard Bramall	Johnny Byrne	16 February 1985
18	"It's All Done with Mirrors"	Richard Bramall	Anthony Read	23 February 1985
19	"Dangerous Practice"	Michael E. Briant	Johnny Byrne	2 March 1985
20	"A Killer Called Cuddles"	Richard Bramall	Anthony Read	9 February 1985
21	"Thank You, Mr. D.H. Lawrence"	Richard Bramall	Anthony Read	16 March 1985
22	"A Close Run Thing..."	Michael E. Briant	Johnny Byrne	23 March 1985

=== Series 3 ===
No.	Title	Directed by	Written by	Original release date
23	"Changing Places"	Andrew Morgan	Johnny Byrne	28 February 1987
24	"Remember the Humble Guinea-Pig"	Andrew Morgan	Johnny Byrne	7 March 1987
25	"First Things First"	Roderick Graham	Johnny Byrne	14 March 1987
26	"Tiger, Tiger"	Roderick Graham	Johnny Byrne	21 March 1987
27	"The Monkey in Between"	Andrew Morgan	Terry Hodgkinson	28 March 1987
28	"Dangerous Games"	Andrew Morgan	Johnny Byrne	4 April 1987
29	"The Elephant and the Kangaroo"	Roderick Graham	Terry Hodgkinson	11 April 1987
30	"A Dying Breed"	Andrew Morgan	Freda Kelsall	18 April 1987
31	"Down Below"	Roderick Graham	Terry Hodgkinson	25 April 1987
32	"Coming to Terms"	Andrew Morgan	Johnny Byrne	2 May 1987
