= How We Used to Live =

British children's educational TV series (1968–2002)

- Starring: Sue Jenkins; Jane Hazlegrove; Peter Howitt; Diana Davies; Puneet Sira many others
- Country of origin: United Kingdom
- Original language: English

Production
- Running time: c.20 mins

Original release
- Network: Yorkshire Television
- Release: 1968 – 2002

How We Used to Live is a British educational history television series, produced for most of its run by Yorkshire Television. The series, encompassing drama and documentary, remained in sporadic production from 1968 to 2002, airing on ITV and Channel 4.

Written from 1975 to 1996 by Freda Kelsall, the series traced the lives and fortunes of various fictional Yorkshire families from the Victorian era until the early 1970s, in and around the fictional town of Bradley, using self-contained short dramas interspersed with archive footage.

- How We Used to Live Episodes; Series 1: Late Victorians; Original air date: autumn 1968, spring 1969 & summer 1969 (the final three episodes added to the series in spring & summer 1973)
- 1. The Big House; 2. The Small House; 3. House in the Middle; 4. The Parlour; 5. The Bedroom; 6. Kitchen; 7. What's Cooking?; 8. Spick and Span; 9. Lighting the Lamp; 10. Festive Season; 11. Keeping Warm; 12. Keeping in Touch; 13. Evenings at Home; 14. When We Were Ill; 15. Shopping; 16. Growing Up at Home; 17. Going to School; 18. On the Road; 19. Travelling by Train; 20. Sunday – the Day of Rest; 21. In the Country; 22. In the Garden; 23. Sport; 24. Clothes and Occasions; 25. At the Seaside; 26. Summing Up; 27. In the Street; 28. Children and the Law; 29. On the Farm

- How We Used to Live Episodes; Series 2: 1908–1945; Original air date: autumn 1975 & spring 1976
- 1. 1908: Moving Day; 2. 1908: Hard at Work; 3. 1909: Still at School; 4. 1909: A Home for Grandma; 5. 1910: An Evening Out; 6. 1910: Jane's First Job; 7. 1911: A Day in the Country; 8. 1913: Vote for Mum; 9. 1915: Going for a Soldier; 10. 1917-18: Armistice; 11. 1925: On the Air; 12. 1926: On Strike; 13. 1928: On the Mains; 14. 1931: On the Dole; 15. 1932: All at Sea; 16. 1939: Blackout; 17. 1940: Invasion; 18. 1940: Blitz; 19. 1943: In Short Supply; 20. 1945: Victory

- How We Used to Live Episodes; Series 3: 1874–1887; Original air date: autumn 1978 & spring 1979
- 1. 1874: New Arrivals; 2. 1874: Too Old for Nanny; 3. 1875: Too Young for the Mill; 4. 1876: Never too late to Learn; 5. 1876: Daily Round; 6. 1877: Evening Hours; 7. 1878: The Pledge; 8. 1879: Mud Lane; 9. 1880: Polling Day; 10. 1880: Christmas; 11. 1881: Remember the Sabbath; 12. 1882: On the Parish; 13. 1882: The Spa; 14. 1883: Fit for a Lady; 15. 1884: Ideas Unlimited; 16. 1885: Let the Punishment fit the Crime; 17. 1885: Green and Pleasant Land; 18. 1886: God Bless the Squire; 19. 1887: Proposals; 20. 1887: Wedding Bells

- How We Used to Live Episodes; Series 4: 1936–1953; Original air date: autumn 1981 & spring 1982
- 1. 1936: Head of the Family; 2. 1937: Counting the Cost; 3. 1938: Holiday With Pay; 4. 1939: Hospital Case; 5. 1939: Goodnight Children Everywhere; 6. 1940: Home from Home; 7. 1942: Stars and Stripes; 8. 1943: Make Do and Mend; 9. 1943: Take a Man's Place; 10. 1944: Peace on Earth; 11. 1945: Let us Face the Future; 12. 1946: Full Supporting Programme; 13. 1947: Cold Comfort; 14. 1947: A New Look; 15. 1948: Full Steam Ahead; 16. 1948: On the National Health; 17. 1949: On the Move; 18. 1951: A Tonic for the Nation; 19. 1952: We Have Travelled a Hard Road; 20. 1953: Your Undoubted Queen

- How We Used to Live Episodes; Series 5: 1902–1926; Original air date: autumn 1984 & spring 1985
- 1. 1902: Home from the War; 2. 1903: Chapel on Sunday; 3. 1905: Bank Holiday; 4. 1906: Vote for Change; 5. 1909: The People's Budget; 6. 1910: Out of Work; 7. 1911: In the Country; 8. 1912: The Children's Charter; 9. 1913: The Right to Vote; 10. 1914: Over by Christmas; 11. 1916: Called Up; 12. 1917: The Right to Serve; 13. 1918: The Need to Share; 14. 1919: Epidemic; 15. 1920: Hill Climb; 16. 1921: Roof Fall; 17. 1922: The Electric Light; 18. 1924: The Cat's Whisker; 19. 1925: The Roaring Twenties; 20. 1926: The General Strike

- How We Used to Live Episodes; Series 6: 1954–1970; Original air date: autumn 1987 & spring 1988
- 1. 1954: Land of Plenty; 2. 1955: Home Before Nine; 3. 1956: Keeping Britain Great; 4. 1957: Commercial Breaks; 5. 1958: Easter Holiday; 6. 1959: Separate Schools; 7. 1960: Women's Wrongs; 8. 1961: Rising High; 9. 1962: Strangers on the Shore; 10. 1963: Our Kind of Music; 11. 1964: Mini on the Motorway; 12. 1965: Last Train from Mill Road; 13. 1966: Amazing Reductions; 14. 1966: Eyes Down at the Roxy; 15. 1967: Flower Power; 16. 1967: The Big Clean Up; 17. 1968: No Fun Being Old; 18. 1969: On the Moon; 19. 1969: Twin Towns; 20. 1970: Coming of Age

- How We Used to Live Episodes; Series 7: Victorians: Early and Late; Original air date: autumn 1990
- 1. A Time of Change; 2. Family Cares; 3. Proper Jobs; 4. Fatal Mixture; 5. Rights And Wrongs; 6. Half A Century On; 7. A Model Village; 8. The Hidden Tenth; 9. A Bible and a Rose; 10. Utopia Limited

- How We Used to Live Episodes; From Iron Ways to Victorian Days; Original air date: 1996
- 1. The Iron Cradle; 2. 1815: Geordie Lads & Cornish Men; 3. 1820–1821: Horses on the Wagon Way; 4. 1823–1825: The Quaker Railway; 5. Great Britons and Local Heroes

== Transmission details ==
Each series was broadcast as part of ITV Schools, on ITV between 1968 and 1987 and then on Channel 4 and S4C. The series, generally running for 20 programmes, was split into two-halves – with the first ten episodes transmitted in the autumn term (usually September – December), followed by the remainder of the series in the spring term (from the second week of January until late March). The programmes were repeated frequently, enabling new generations of children to learn about modern history.

The series was mainly shown during the main schools schedule, although it was occasionally transmitted at other times. The British Film Institute lists Thora Hird Introduces How We Used to Live for 30 August 1984, describing it as "a documentary on the making of the award-winning schools series". It further says that it was shown late at night on most of the ITV network.

Part of the first series was repeated late at night in its home region of Yorkshire Television in early 1969. Also, the episodes 'Blitz' and 'Victory', first shown in 1976, were repeated on the ITV network on 8 May 1985, the 40th anniversary of VE Day.

== Series ==
There were several series of How We Used to Live.

Series 1 centred on the late Victorian era. It was first broadcast in 1968. Some additional episodes were added to this series in 1972/1973 but this was not a separate series. This series featured on-screen presenters including Geoffrey Wheeler and Redvers Kyle.

Series 2 covered the periods 1908–1918 (autumn term 1975) and 1925–1945 (spring term 1976). The first half of the series (Episodes 1-10) centred around the Ackerley family, who move into their new home, 13 Sultan Street, Bradley in 1908. Albert, the father, is an assistant at a printing works. He earns 22/- per week. His son Harry takes a job as a grocers boy, earning 5/- per week. The rent of their terraced house, with gas and water laid on, is 6/- per week. Albert's wife Daisy must make the rest of the income cover food, fuel and clothing. Jane, their daughter, is still at school until the age of 14 when she goes to work as a housemaid in a middle-class home. Episodes 11–15 see the Dawson family move into the house formerly occupied by the Ackerley family. Stanley Dawson, the father, works as a stores clerk in a factory, earning £3/2/6 per week. He becomes unemployed in the thirties and he, his wife Doris and son Gerald are forced to rely on the earnings of daughter Marjorie, who works as a library assistant. The Boothroyds move into the terraced house just before World War Two – the last five episodes describe how they cope with the varied hazards of civilian life in wartime Britain. The series is narrated by YTV continuity announcer John Crosse.

Series 3 covers a thirteen-year period, namely the years 1874–1887. This series was first broadcast in 1978/1979. This series contrasts the fortunes of three families that although linked, have very different lives. Dr Hughes has a successful medical practice in middle-class Upper Bradley. His fee-paying patients live in the better part of town, or in the country houses on the outskirts. He gives some of his time to the Bradley Free Hospital, and, as Medical Officer of Health, is appalled by conditions in poor working-class areas. His wife, his son and youngest daughter live comfortable lives in a large house with their every need taken care of by the hired help- namely housekeeper Mrs Tandy, Annie Fairhurst and Nanny. The Hughes eldest daughter, Dora, is married to Captain Bertram Selwyn. His father is the squire of Westmoor (a role Bertram is required to fulfil after the death of his father). They have two children: Humphrey (born in 1874) and Sophie (born 1881). The lifestyles of the middle class Hughes and mildly aristocratic Selwyn families is in sharp contrast to that of the Fairhurst's. Ben and Mary Fairhurst are poor working class mill workers with more children than they can afford to feed. Annie, the eldest, is in service for Dr Hughes. Among the other children are Matt, Flo, Maudie, Tommy and Dinah, as well as the others who died young.

Series 4 covered the period from 1936 until 1953. It centred on the lower middle-class Hodgkins family. First broadcast in 1981/1982, this series embraces the events during the reign of George VI as they affected the family of Arthur Hodgkins, a railwayman living in Bradley. Along with his housewife Mabel and his four children, Patricia, Jimmy, Avril & Edward, they endure the hardships of the Second World War and the subsequent austerity period. The series concludes with the Coronation of Queen Elizabeth II.

Series 5 was first broadcast in 1984–1985. It covered the major events and social changes from the end of the Boer War in 1902 to the General Strike of 1926. The series tells the story of the friendship between two families of children who meet in Sunday school. The Holroyds, Maurice, Charlotte and Alexander are middle class. Their father owns the local textile mill. The Selbys, Maggie, Tom, Freddy, Albert & Alice are poor. Their father is a drunkard, their mother works long hours in the mill to support them. As they grow up into young adults, their lives become intertwined and the relationship, sometimes strained, shows the huge social changes which affected people in Britain during this time.

Series 6 covered the period 1954–1970. It was first broadcast in 1987–1988 and centred on the Brady family. Michael Brady, the father of the family, was a character originally introduced in series 5 when he was born to Maggie Selby and Patrick Brady. The series begins with he and his family (wife Joan and children Susan, Roger & Beverley) moving back to Bradley. The series also features Michael's Uncle Albert & Aunt Bertha (Selby) who were also in the fifth series. Characters introduced in the fourth series, Jimmy, Eileen and Edward Hodgkins and Laurence and Avril Butterworth are also regulars, and the characters of Tom and Charlotte Selby from Series 5 and Esme Birkett from Series 4 also make guest appearances. YTV announcer Redvers Kyle returned to narrate short segments featuring archive film footage.

After six series, How We Used To Live changed its direction (largely because of the National Curriculum). The drama format was expanded in order to take in more documentary material, but the series length was cut.

Series 7 was in two-halves. The first 10 episodes were called Victorians: Early and Late. These were first broadcast in 1990. In spring 1991, five programmes, under the title Expansion, Trade and Industry, followed the experience of a merchant family.

Subsequent series were In Civil War (first shown spring 1993), A Tudor Interlude (first shown autumn 1993), Isaac Newton: Under the Stuarts (first shown spring 1995) and From Iron Ways to Victorian Days (first shown spring 1996; the Iron Ways section was new, and the last series of HWUTL to be written by Freda Kelsall, but the Victorian Days section was a rerun of the first half of Victorians: Early and Late). Britons at War (first shown spring 1997) and The Spanish Armada (first shown autumn 1998) were still produced by Yorkshire Television, but the remaining four units were made by independent companies – All Change (first shown autumn 1999, and dealing with the 25 years after the Second World War in the UK), and Tudor Times, Tony Robinson's Local History Search and A Giant in Ancient Egypt (all first shown spring 2002). The last of these units was still regularly repeated until Channel 4 stopped showing schools programmes in 2009.

== Cast and characters ==
Character name is in bold; actor(s) names are in brackets. Many characters were played by multiple actors as the character grew up from year to year.

=== Series 2 ===
The Ackerley family – 1908–1918

- **Albert Ackerley** (Peter Ellis) – Head of the family, he is the main breadwinner, earning 22/-. a week working at a printing firm.
- **Daisy Ackerley** (Lorraine Peters) – The hardworking mother keeps house and often looks after her next door's neighbours son.
- **Harry Ackerley** (Bernard Padden) – Starts work at the local grocers shortly after moving in.
- **Jane Ackerley** (Jane Hutcheson) – Still a pupil at Bradley Higher Elementary School in 1908.
- **Mary Ann Bond** (Jill Summers)
- **Victor Bond**

Other Characters

- **Mrs. Nuttall** (Alison Mead) – Next door neighbour to the Ackerley family. She is a widow by 1908, left to bring up her son, Steven.
- **Steven Nuttall** – Son to Mrs. Nuttall. Appears throughout the series, first as a baby in episode 2.
- **Mr. Todd** (Fred Gaunt) – Albert's boss at the printing works, he helps with the family moving house in the first episode.
- **Amos Hebden** (Bert Gaunt) – The local grocer, he employs Harry as a delivery boy and counter hand on a starting wage of 5/-. a week.

The Dawson Family 1925–1939

- **Stanley Dawson**
- **Doris Dawson**
- **Marjorie Dawson**
- **Gerald Dawson**

=== Series 4 ===
The Hodgkins family

- **Arthur Hodgkins** (John Keyworth) A railwayman, working in the office of Bradley Station. Serves as an ARP Warden during the war.
- **Mabel Hodgkins** (Diana Davies) A housewife for much of the series, she returns to her former profession – teaching – during the war.
- **Jimmy Hodgkins** (Gary Carp), (Mark Uttley) The eldest son, leaves school at 14 and is employed in various jobs with the GPO during the series. Serves in the army during the war, including a spell in a Prisoner of War camp. Marries Eileen, the girl next door, after the war; together they have a son, Peter.
- **Patricia Hodgkins** (Julie Shipley) Leaves grammar school to train as a nurse during the war. Becomes a GI bride upon marrying Polish-American Anton Podemski; they subsequently become parents to a son, Gary, and daughter Elizabeth.
- **Avril Hodgkins** (Joanna Kennedy), (Rachel Ambler) Serves in the Women's Land Army but struggles to find work after leaving, eventually working for Boots and studying at college to make up for her war-disrupted education. Marries Laurence Butterworth, a council Housing Officer.
- **Edward Hodgkins** (Daniel Swayne), (Tamlyn Robins), (Christopher Ley Rose), (Richard Revell), (Phillip Batty). Two years old when the series starts, the series follows him through school (including a spell at a choral school) and as the series ends is looking to attend university.

Other Characters

- **David and Sarah Levinson** (Anthony Shaeffer) (Valerie Shute). Neighbours of the Hodgkins family at the start of the series. David is a dentist and their daughter Rebecca is friends with Avril Hodgkins. The family are Jewish and they move to New York shortly before the start of World War II.
- **Audrey Maitland** (Doreen Sloane). A well-to-do middle aged widow from the south of England who moves into the Levinson's former home. Is called up for war work and ends up working in a munitions factory. Moves away after her son Bruce is badly burnt while in RAF service, but visits Arthur and Mabel Hodgkins in 1952.
- **Bruce Maitland** (Nicholas Fry) Audrey's son who serves in the RAF. Is badly burnt in action and moves away. Later, his mother says he has had plastic surgery when she visits the Hodgkins family in 1952.
- **Mary Haliwell** (Lorraine Sass) Best friend of Tricia Hodgkins who attends grammar school with her. Mary's family own a local factory. She is killed in a doodlebug raid while staying in Oldham.
- **Mrs Battersby** (Frances Cox) Neighbour & friend of the Hodgkins family. A rather scatty old lady who is deaf and refuses to use her ear trumpet. She is killed during one of the first bombings on Bradley in 1940.
- **Anton Podemski** (Jay Benedict) Polish-American soldier who is stationed with his regiment in Bradley. Becomes engaged to Tricia Hodgkins and they marry on VJ Day and move to Anton's home city of Minneapolis. Tricia, Anton and their children visit Bradley in 1953 when Elizabeth II is crowned.
- **Tom Taylor** (Ray Dunbobbin) Local shopkeeper who appears in many of the World War II episodes. His wife dies in 1943. Has retired by 1953.
- **Alf Birkett** (Norman Mitchell). Moves next door to the Hodgkins family after the war with his wife Esme and their daughter Eileen. Works as a painter and decorator.
- **Esme Birkett** (Carol Reeve). Alf's wife who is rather nosey and a bit of a gossip. Esme is very upset when King George VI dies.
- **Eileen Birkett** (Patsy Blower). Daughter of Alf and Esme who marries Jimmy Hodgkins.

=== Series 5 ===
Selby family

- **Victor Selby** (Jack Carr 6 episodes). Alcoholic father of the family. Often absent from home in the earlier episodes. Died in 1918 just after the armistice was declared.
- **Sarah Selby** (Brenda Elder 8 episodes). Working class mother of five children. Died of an illness in 1913.

- **Maggie Brady** (née Selby) (Kathy Jamieson 12 episodes, Jane Hazlegrove 5 episodes). Eldest child of Victor and Sarah. Married soldier Patrick Brady
- **Patrick Brady**. Kevin Wallace Married Maggie Selby after returning from the Boer War to find the Selby family living in his old house after his family had done a moonlight flit. Killed in action in 1916 in World War I.

- **Michael Brady** (Craig McKay 4 episodes, Stephen Bollard 3 episodes, Nicholas Ross 2 episodes). Young son of Maggie and Patrick. Character reappears as the father in Series 6.

- **Tom Selby** (Peter Howitt – 12 episodes, Cy Chadwick 3 episodes). Second child of Victor and Sarah. Gets elected as a Labour Member of Parliament in the 1920s. Eventually marries Charlotte Holroyd.
- **Freddie Selby** (Ben Fell 5 episodes, Ian Mercer 3 episodes). Third child of Victor and Sarah. Killed in action, along with Maurice Holroyd, in World War I on the same day in 1917.
- **Albert Selby** (John Laing 6 episodes, Alistair Walker 5 episodes). Fourth child. Lied about his age to sign up to fight in World War I. Marries Bertha Beale after the war. Character reppears as elderly uncle of Michael Brady in Series 6.
- **Bertha Beale** (Maria Mescki 5 episodes, Katie Hall 2 episodes). Grocers daughter. Married Albert Selby after the war. Character reppears as the elderly aunt of Michael Brady in Series 6.
- **Alice Selby** (Tara Moran 6 episodes, Lorraine Sass 5 episodes). Youngest child of Victor and Sarah. Went to London in 1920s and reappears in 1925 as a socialite and flapper having got in with a posh crowd despite her working-class roots.

Holroyd family

- **George Holroyd** (David Scase 5 episodes). Head of the rich Holroyd family and owner of the factory where many of the Selby family work. Died in 1909 of an illness.
- **Emily Holroyd** (Elizabeth Kelly 4 episodes). Wife of George Holroyd. Injured when the Scarborough hotel she had evacuated to was bombed in the First World War and died off-screen shortly afterwards.

- **Maurice Holroyd** (Paul Gabriel 7 episodes, Mark Thrippleton 3 episodes). Eldest child of George and Emily. Friend to Tom Selby. Killed in action along with Freddie Selby in the First World War on the same day in 1917.
- **Charlotte Holroyd** (Sue Jenkins 12 episodes, Wendy Jane Walker 6 episodes). Eldest daughter of George and Emily. Was a suffragette and eventually married Tom Selby.
- **Alexander Holroyd** (David Michaels, 8 episodes). Youngest child of George and Emily. Was imprisoned for being a conscientious objector in the First World War

Other characters

- **John Pilling** (James Walker, 6 episodes) Methodist Minister at the local Chapel attended by the Selbys and Holroyds.
- **Mr Beale** (Alan Starkey 4 episodes). Bertha's father who runs the local Co-operative Store
- **Mrs Beale** (Ruth Holden 5 episodes). Bertha's mother who runs the local Co-operative store.
- **Ned Wilkins** (Dickie Arnold 4 episodes). Works Manager at Holroyd's Mill. Also a local councillor and Deputy Mayor of Bradley.
- **Hospital Sister** (Eileen O'Brien, 1 episode)

=== Series 6 ===
The Selby/Brady Family

- **Bertha Selby** (Ruth Holden). A reappearing character, having originally appeared in Series 5. Runs Selby's bakery and cafe with her husband Albert. In 1955 they convert the cafe to a coffee bar which they rename the Sorrento.
- **Albert Selby** (Bobby Knutt) A reappearing character, having originally appeared in Series 5. Local baker and cafe owner who likes to have a go at anything. In the 1955 episode, he dances to "Rock Around the Clock" while the song plays on the Sorrento's jukebox.
- **Michael Brady** (Dennis Blanch) Father of the Brady family. Reappearing character, having originally appeared in Series 5. Michael works as a postman and is later elected a councillor for Bradley.
- **Joan Brady** (Eileen O'Brien). Wife of Michael. Is mainly a housewife for most of the series, she sometimes helps Bertha at the Sorrento. In the last episode, Joan says she is starting an Open University course.
- **Susan Brady** (Tara Moran), (Jacqueline Naylor). Eldest child of Michael and Joan Brady. Sneaks away from a family holiday in 1958 to take part in an anti-nuclear war march at Aldermaston. Later becomes a reporter for the Bradley Gazette and eventually married Edward Hodgkins. Their daughter Victoria is born in the last episode.
- **Roger Brady** (Luke Harris), (Neil Meuse), (Huw Higginson). Middle child of the Bradys. Roger is thrilled when the family first have a TV in 1957. Moves to South Wales after leaving school and is a rescuer at the Aberfan disaster. Roger came back to Bradley in 1967 as a hippie, to the dismay of his father and then studies at Cardiff University.
- **Beverley Brady** (Gemma (Selina) Forster) (Jessica Harris), (Rebecca Sowden), (Anna Jane Casey). Youngest of the Brady children. Becomes a fan of The Beatles and attends one of the band's concerts with Roger. Later becomes interested in photography and wins a Duke of Edinburgh Award in the subject. Turns 18 in the final episode.

The Hodgkins/Butterworth Family

- **Jimmy Hodgkins** (Fine Time Fontayne). A reappearing character who was first seen in Series 4. Jimmy and his wife Eileen now run a sub-post office and general store. They move from Bradley in 1965 to run a bar in London when the area where the post office is located is redeveloped.
- **Eileen Hodgkins** (Kazia Pelka). Jimmy's wife, who originally appeared in Series 4. Also runs the Bradley Youth Club with her husband.
- **Peter Hodgkins** (William Ash), (Mark Gillard), (Martin Sadofski). Jimmy and Eileen's son who was born in Series 4. Becomes friends with Roger Brady. Moves to London in 1965 but returns to Bradley two years later as a trainee police officer.
- **Avril Butterworth** **(née Hodgkins)** (Rachel Laurence). Reappearing character having originally appeared in Series 4. Avril, her husband Laurence and their children live across the road from the Bradys. Works as a pharmacist but gives up her job due to the Thalidomide controversy. Takes part in a 1958 anti-nuclear war march. Tragically killed in a car crash with Laurence on their son's ninth birthday.
- **Laurence Butterworth** (Robin Bowerman). Avril's husband who is a council housing officer. Laurence is also a choirmaster and organist. Killed with Avril in a motorway crash on the way back from London after helping Jimmy and Eileen move home.
- **Margot Butterworth** (Claire McGinty), (Georgina Lane). Eldest child of the Butterworths. Becomes friends with Beverley Brady. Is a fan of both The Beatles and The Rolling Stones, to Beverley's surprise.
- **Anthony Butterworth** (Richard Redfern), (Paul Kirkbright). Younger child of the Butterworths. His parents are killed on his ninth birthday returning from London when a van driven by drunken hippies hits their Mini in a layby.
- **Edward Hodgkins** (Daniel O'Brien). Reappearing character having originally appeared in Series 4. Returns to Bradley in 1963 after working for the German government following university. Becomes a teacher at Bradley Polytechnic and is later the guardian of his sister Avril's children following their parents' deaths. Marries Susan Brady and their daughter Victoria is born in the final episode.

Other Characters

- **Esme Birkett** (Rosalie Williams). Character originally appeared in Series 4. Now widowed, Esme lives in a terraced house which is demolished and she moves to a tower block. Is friendly with Albert Selby. Eventually moves to an old people's bungalow (1968) with Albert and Bertha as her neighbours.
- **Dorothy Clegg** (Jane Hazlegrove). A friend of Susan Brady's who only appears in the early episodes. A member of Bradley Youth Club.
- **Megan Jones** (Jenny Downham). Roger Brady's hippie girlfriend who he first met in South Wales. Announced in the final episode that she was starting a holistic therapy business.
- **Charlotte Selby** (Elizabeth Kelly). Character originally appeared in Series 5. Makes a one-off appearance in the 1958 episode where she meets Avril and Laurence Butterworth on the anti-nuclear war march. Dies between 1958 and 1970.
- **Tom Selby** (Stanley Lebor). Originally a main character in Series 5. Makes a one-off appearance in the 1970 episode and mentions that Charlotte has died. As a retired Labour MP, he voices his obvious annoyance at the Conservative Party winning the election.
- **Gary Podemski** (Mark Zingale). Character who was born in Series 4 to Tricia (née Hodgkins) and Anton. Visits Bradley in 1967 for the first time since the Coronation and reveals that he has deserted the US Army while fighting in the Vietnam War.

Note: Michael Brady's mother Maggie has died before the series began, although her date of death is not mentioned – the character is referred to in the past tense once or twice throughout the series. Also, the characters of Arthur and Mabel Hodgkins appear to have died prior to 1965 as they are not at Avril and Laurence's funeral and don't appear on Edward and Susan's wedding photo (the wedding itself was unseen).

== Support materials ==
Each series was supported by a range of materials for teachers and their pupils.

To help teachers make the most from each programme, Teachers' Notes provided a wealth of knowledge and ideas. Typically the notes contained:

- An introduction to the historical period covered & the principal characters;
- Reading List for teachers & pupils;
- Main events of the period;
- The story of each episode;
- Historical notes on each episode;
- Preparation, which suggested activities which completed prior to viewing of each episode would help pupils make sense of what they saw;
- Questions which could be used in discussion or as part of a worksheet;
- Follow-up activities which would build on what had been seen in the episode, e.g. a wall collage, class discussion, role play etc.

Support material for the fifth series (1902–1926) was funded via a non-broadcast sponsorship arrangement with Midland Bank. Any form of advertising or commercial sponsorship for ITV schools programming was otherwise prohibited by the Independent Broadcasting Authority.

== Home media ==
All series of How We Used to Live from the 1975–1976 series to A Tudor Interlude (1993) were released on VHS in 1994 and 1995 by Yorkshire International Thomson Multimedia. These were intended for educational institutions only, but have since become collectable among a general audience and are often available on sites such as eBay.
