= Sonia Graham =

English actress (1929–2018)

- Born: 22 August 1929; Croydon, Surrey, England, UK
- Died: 18 February 2018 (aged 88); Wandsworth, London, England, UK
- Education: Guildhall School of Music and Drama
- Occupation: Actor
- Years active: 1957–2000

Sonia Graham (born Sonia Mary Biddlecombe; 22 August 1929 – 18 February 2018) was an English actress whose career spanned over 40 years. She appeared in several British television series.

== Biography ==
She trained at the Guildhall School of Music and Drama, having previously worked as a dancer, making her professional debut aged 13 with the Carl Rosa Opera Company. After early acting experience in repertory theatre, Graham played Mary Ellen in Meet Me by Moonlight in the West End, and an excerpt from this on the BBC's Theatre Night became her TV debut, in 1957. Her big break, however, came three years later when she played Mary Bewick in the television series A House Called Bell Tower.

From 1962 to 1963, she played Maggie Clifford in 63 episodes of the TV series Compact. In 1966, she appeared in six episodes of Foreign Affairs as Irinka. In 1968, she was a series regular in Crime Buster. Between 1974 and 1978, Graham portrayed Assistant Governor Martha Parrish in all five series of the LWT prison drama Within These Walls.

In 1978, she began the recurring role of the cat-obsessed Mrs Bond in All Creatures Great and Small. She appeared three times in the series' original run (1978–80), and once in its 1988–90 revival.

In 1984, she appeared as Ethel Ledbetter in 32 episodes of the series One by One. In 1995 Graham began the role of Evgenia Estafis in London's Burning for 27 episodes.

== Death ==
Graham died on 18 February 2018, aged 88, in Wandsworth, London.
