= The Agatha Christie Hour =

British television series

The Agatha Christie Hour is a ten-part series of stand-alone television plays made by Thames Television for the ITV network, based on short stories by Agatha Christie and broadcast between 7 September and 16 November 1982.

Music was by Harry Rabinowitz.

The series is available on DVD.

== The Case of the Middle-Aged Wife ==
Broadcast 7 September 1982
Adapted by Freda Kelsall from Parker Pyne Investigates.
Directed by Michael Simpson

Parker Pyne helps a middle-aged wife who is losing the attention of her philandering husband.

Cast

- Maurice Denham as Parker Pyne
- Gwen Watford as Mariah Packington
- Peter Jones as George Packington
- Angela Easterling as Miss Lemon
- Nicholas Cook as Eric
- Malcolm Hebden as Waiter
- Nick Curtis as Crooner
- Linda Robson as Edna, a Maid
- Monica Grey as Beautician
- Brenda Cowling as Miss Draper
- Rupert Frazer as Claude Luttrell
- Kate Dorning as Nancy Purvis

== In a Glass Darkly ==
Broadcast 14 September 1982

Visiting Badgeworthy, the house of the Carslakes, with his friend Neil Carslake, Matthew Armitage sees a vision in a bedroom mirror of a scarred man strangling a woman – although he cannot see his face. He goes downstairs to an engagement party and believes the couple are the victim, Sylvia Carslake, and her killer in his vision, Charles Crawley, who has the distinctive scar. He urges Sylvia not to marry Crawley, telling her about the vision. Later, during the war, Armitage meets his friend Carslake and hears that Sylvia did not marry Crawley. Carslake is then killed in battle, and Armitage visits Sylvia on his next leave. Not long after, Armitage is injured, Sylvia visits him in hospital. She says Crawley has also been killed and explains that she broke off her engagement because she fell in love with Armitage. Armitage recovers, but is left with a scar. He and Sylvia are married. Four years later, Armitage becomes jealous of Derek Wainwright when he flirts with Sylvia. Sylvia, distressed, runs away from him and says in a letter she is going to "the only person who loves her." Armitage tracks her down and begins to strangle her, then sees himself in a mirror and realises he was always the scarred man in his long-ago vision. He breaks down and says he is sorry.

Cast

- Nicholas Clay as Matthew Armitage
- Emma Piper as Sylvia Carslake
- Elspet Gray as Mrs Carslake
- Shaun Scott as Neil Carslake
- Nicholas Le Prevost as Derek Wainwright
- Valerie Lush as Mrs Hobbs
- Jonathon Morris as Alan Carslake
- John Golightly as Commanding Officer
- Eileen Davies as Nurse
- David Cook as Captain Mountjoy
- Brian Anthony as Charles Crawley
- Marjorie Bland as Charlotte Hardy
- John Wheatley as Barton
- Kenneth Midwood as Hobbs
- Elizabeth Benson as Mrs Armitage
- Sarah-Jane Bickerton as Lucy Jerrard

== The Girl in the Train ==
Broadcast 21 September 1982
Adapted by William Corlett from The Listerdale Mystery
Directed by Brian Farnham

George Rowland is fired from his uncle William Rowland's firm of investment brokers and soon finds adventure. He hides a girl on a train who says she is escaping from her uncle, a foreign spy. She gives George a parcel and vanishes.

Cast

- Osmund Bullock as George Rowland
- Sarah Berger as Elizabeth
- David Neal as Rogers
- Arthur Blake as Sturm
- Roy Kinnear as Cabbie
- James Grout as William Rowland
- Ernest Clark as Detective Inspector Jarrold
- Ron Pember as the Mysterious Stranger
- Harry Fielder as the Guard

== The Fourth Man ==
Broadcast 28 September 1982
Directed by Michael Simpson
Adapted by William Corlett from The Hound of Death

A doctor, a priest, and a lawyer are talking in a railway compartment, discussing the reported suicide of a young woman, Annette Ravel. They are joined by a fourth man, Raoul Letardau, who knows more about it and talks about Annette's love-hate relationship with the backward Felicie Bault.

Cast

- Prue Clarke as Annette Ravel
- Fiona Mathieson as Felicie Bault
- John Nettles as Raoul Letardau
- Michael Gough as Sir George Durand
- Alan MacNaughtan as Sir Campbell Clark
- Geoffrey Chater as Canon Parfitt
- Frederick Jaeger as the Count
- Cy Town as Porter
- Stuart Fell as Juggler
- Eric Richard as Stage Manager
- Christopher Wren as Annette's Attendant

== The Case of the Discontented Soldier ==
Broadcast 5 October 1982
Adapted by T. R. Bowen from Parker Pyne Investigates
Directed by Michael Simpson

With the help of Parker Pyne and a retired major, Freda Clegg finds an African treasure and love.

Cast

- Maurice Denham as Parker Pyne
- Angela Easterling as Miss Lemon
- Patricia Garwood as Freda Clegg
- William Gaunt as Major Charles Wilbraham
- Lally Bowers as Ariadne Oliver
- Walter Gaunt as Wally
- Lewis Fiander as Reid
- Barbara New as Mrs Benson
- Derek Smee as Head Waiter
- Karen Mount as English Rose
- Paul Dadson as Neville
- Jason Norman as Charlie
- Veronica Strong as Madeleine de Sara
- Peter Brayham as First Thug
- Terry Plummer as Second Thug

== Magnolia Blossom ==
Broadcast 12 October 1982

Theo has a rich uncaring husband and is about to run away to South Africa with a lover, Vincent. They get as far as Paris, but after hearing that her husband's financial empire is collapsing and he may be arrested for fraud, Theo decides to stick by Richard.

Cast

- Ciaran Madden as Theo Darrell
- Jeremy Clyde as Richard Darrell
- Ralph Bates as Vincent Easton
- Brian Oulton as Bates
- Alexandra Bastedo as Clare Hamilton
- Jack May as Colonel Jaggers
- Charles Hodgson as Cabinet Minister
- Phillip Cade as Bobby Dorkins
- Sarah-Jane Varley as Vanessa
- Graham Seed as Charles Willerby
- Jane Laurie as Imogen
- Jennifer Croxton as Marlita
- Keith Marsh as Ticket Inspector
- Derek Fuke as Taxi Driver

== The Mystery of the Blue Jar ==
Broadcast 19 October 1982
Adapted from The Witness for the Prosecution and Other Stories

Jack Hartington, a solicitor's clerk, is staying at a hotel to play golf in the mornings. He hears a woman's voice crying "Murder, help, murder!" from a cottage. Running towards the voice, he finds Felise Marchaud, a young Frenchwoman living in the cottage, but she says she has heard nothing. Hartington tells his story to Lavington, a fellow guest, who investigates and finds a story of the supernatural centring on a blue Chinese jar belonging to his Uncle George. But at the end of the story a more down-to-earth explanation of the mystery emerges.

Cast

- Robin Kermode as Jack Hartington
- Isabelle Spade as Felise Marchaud
- Michael Aldridge as Dr Lavington
- Derek Francis as Uncle George
- Hugh Walters as Dodds
- Ivor Roberts as Hubble
- Robert Austin as Police Sergeant
- Glynis Brooks as Agnes
- Philip Bird as Marchaud
- Tara Ward as Portia

== The Red Signal ==
Broadcast 2 November 1982
Adapted by William Corlett from The Hound of Death Directed by John Frankau

Dermot West is falling in love with Claire Trent, the wife of his best friend, Jack. He visits them and has a premonition, or "red signal", that death is in the air. Dermot's uncle, a psychiatrist, is killed after telling him Claire has a homicidal mania.

Cast

- Richard Morant as Dermot West
- Alan Badel as Sir Alington West
- Michael Denison as Johnson
- Christopher Cazenove as Jack Trent
- Joanna David as Claire Trent
- Ewan Roberts as McKern
- Rosalie Crutchley as Mrs Thompson
- Carol Drinkwater as Violet Eversleigh
- Michael Mellinger as Guido
- Bob Keegan as Inspector Verrall
- Hugh Sullivan as Milson
- David Rolfe as Charlson
- Andrew McCulloch as Constable Cawley
- Christopher Wren as Garry Benson

== Jane in Search of a Job ==
Broadcast 9 November 1982
Adapted by Gerald Savory from The Listerdale Mystery
Directed by Christopher Hodson

Jane Cleveland, who is unemployed, is identical in appearance to a young Grand Duchess threatened by anarchists and is hired to impersonate her.

Cast

- Elizabeth Garvie as Jane Cleveland
- Amanda Redman as Grand Duchess of Ostravia
- Tony Jay as Count Streplitch
- Stephanie Cole as Princess Anna
- Geoffrey Hinsliff as Colonel Kranin
- Andrew Bicknell as Nigel Guest
- Helen Lindsay as Lady Anchester
- Julia McCarthy as Miss Northwood
- George Waring as Station Sergeant
- Roy Macready as Mr. Bissell

== The Manhood of Edward Robinson ==
Broadcast 16 November 1982
Adapted by Gerald Savory from The Listerdale Mystery
Directed by Brian Farnham

Edward Robinson, a timid clerk dominated by a bossy girlfriend, buys a sports car on a whim and finds himself in a romantic adventure.

Cast

- Nicholas Farrell as Edward Robinson
- Ann Thornton as Maud
- Rupert Everett as Guy
- Cherie Lunghi as Lady Noreen Elliot
- Julian Wadham as Gerald Champneys
- Margery Mason as Mrs Lithinglow
- Tom Mannion as Herbert
- Sallyanne Law as Millie
- Patrick Newell as the Major
- Bryan Coleman as Lord Melbury
- Nicholas Bell as Jeremy
- Riona Hendley as Poppy
- Simon Green as Sebastian
- Georgina Coombs as Diana
- Rio Fanning as Barman
- Frank Duncan as Grosvenor
