= Truckers (1992 TV series) =

British stop-motion animated TV series (1992)

- Starring: Joe McGann; Debra Gillett; Rosalie Williams; John Jardine
- Country of origin: United Kingdom
- Original language: English
- No. of series: 1
- No. of episodes: 13

Production
- Running time: 10 minutes
- Production companies: Cosgrove Hall Productions; Thames Television

Original release
- Network: ITV (CITV)
- Release: 10 January – 3 April 1992

Truckers is a British stop motion animated series, an adaptation of the first book of Terry Pratchett's The Nome Trilogy, produced in the United Kingdom by Cosgrove Hall Productions for TV, then released on VHS, though edited together into a feature-length film. The series consisted of 13 ten-minute episodes.

== Plot ==
A group of 'outside' Nomes led by Masklin flee their unsustainable hedgerow home and manage to get inside a traditional old style department store where they meet a group of 'inside' Nomes. The building is scheduled for demolition. Masklin tells the inside Nomes about this but the store Nomes' religion states that 'The Store' consists of the entire universe, and denies the existence of the 'outside'.

With the help of the Outsiders heirloom, a powerful sentient computer called The Thing, Masklin formulates a plan to escape the doomed store. Through skill, courage and sheer good luck, Masklin and his friends manage to evacuate the store Nomes before their home is destroyed.

== Production and notes ==
The puppets were built by Mackinnon & Saunders, created from foam latex.

Some of the interior shots of Arnold Bros was filmed in Lewis's Department Store in Manchester.

Some of the surviving puppets are on public display at the Cosgrove Hall Exhibition in Manchester.

== Episodes ==
No.	Title	Original release date
1	"How It All Began"	10 January 1992
The Thing, a glowing cube, briefly sets the scene: a police car chases a lorry that is driving erratically and pulls it over. One of the officers gets out to talk to the driver, but when he gets to the cab he discovers the lorry is empty. Something is seen cutting the wires under the police car as the officer returns to his car. The lorry drives off, apparently driverless, and the police find that their car won't start. The Thing announces that this is not the end of the story or the start. The story properly begins with Masklin, a 4-inch-high (100 mm) Nome, hunting for food. On returning to his burrow, he argues with the elders of his tribe about the lack of food and that they have no fire for heat. Masklin decides that a lorry might take them to a better place, but as he wonders, a fox attacks one of the elders, Mr Mert. Masklin chases the fox onto the motorway, killing both the fox and Mr Mert. Masklin decides that everyone must leave, so they climb on board a lorry at a nearby motorway service station. The head of the tribe, Torrit, discovers that he has lost The Thing, the symbol of the tribe's authority. He makes Masklin climb down to get it just as the driver returns and the lorry takes off; Masklin is left hanging on the rope.
2	"A Nome's Welcome"	17 January 1992
Masklin manages to climb aboard the lorry, and they settle down as it finally takes them to a department store loading zone. There they discover a Nome named Angalo, who tells them that they are in Arnold Bros., the department store home of several tribes of Nomes. Angalo believes they are from the outside, and takes them before his father, the Duke De Haberdasheri, who does not believe their story and becomes angry with them, denying that 'Outside' exists and stating that it is against the Store Nome's religion. As Masklin and the others leave the Duke's presence, they walk past an electricity cable; lights begin to flash on The Thing as it starts to speak.
3	"The Store in Danger"	24 January 1992
The thing tells them that Nomes are from another planet, that they arrived on earth 15,000 years ago, and that they must return home to their planet. Masklin meets Dorcas, an inventor who shows them his inventions and is intrigued by the concept of 'Life beyond The Store'. The Thing intercepts a radio transmission saying The Store will be demolished in three weeks.
4	"Meet the Abbott"	31 January 1992
Dorcas tells Masklin that no one will believe what The Thing says. He takes them to the see Abbott, leader of the Stationeri, who act as the Store's priesthood. On the way, they are met by Corseteri bandits who are soon driven off. They meet with the Abbott, who does not believe them. Gurder, the Abbot's assistant, tells the Nomes that strange things are happening; items are not being replaced and the Abbott is worried, but he does not want to admit it. Gurder takes them back to see the Abbot, who asks to talk to Masklin and The Thing alone.
5	"The Abbott's Concerns"	7 February 1992
When the Abbott is alone with Masklin, he says that he has a number of concerns about the future of the Store. The Abbott reveals that, many years ago, the different departments fought each other for control of the Store. It was only when the Sationeri asserted that Arnold Bros. (est 1905) wanted the departments to live in peace, which resulted in the cessation of wars. If the Stationeri is proved wrong about the existence of Outside, the other departments may decide they were wrong about Arnold Bros. too, and start fighting again. Therefore the Abbott must pretend that everything is normal to keep the peace. The Thing then tells the Abbott the true history of the Nomes, starting with their spaceship crash-landing on earth 15,000 years ago.
6	"The Hall of the Manager"	14 February 1992
Charged by the Abbott with discovering the truth, Gurder takes Masklin and Grimma to an escalator which takes them to the general manager's office. As Masklin begins searching the desk, they discover a memo to the staff saying that the store will be demolished. They are disturbed by a security guard (whom Gurder identifies as 'Prices Slashed', the Devil of their religious pantheon), but they manage to get past him undetected. They return to find that the Abbott has been talking at length with The Thing, and has reconciled his world view that 'Outside' is an extension of the Store. He decrees that the nomes must return to their true home. This turns out to be his final command, as the Abbott dies shortly after.
7	"Masklin's Plan"	21 February 1992
Gurder presides over the Abbott's funeral, and it is revealed that he was chosen by the old Abbott to replace him, but Gurder does not want the job. Masklin comes up with a plan to save the nomes; they will leave the way they arrived, by stealing a lorry.
8	"Working Together"	28 February 1992
Masklin tells his plan to a number of officials from other clans. The Duke thinks his plan is foolishness, and refuses to participate. All the other clans agree to work together, with the Stationeri (reluctantly) teaching many of the nomes to read. Angalo defies his father by offering to help, and climbs aboard a departing lorry, hoping to learn more about how they work.
9	"The Hostage Situation"	6 March 1992
Angalo climbs on board a lorry, which drives away. A Nome named Vinto, who tends to mistake fiction books for instruction manuals, reads about a hostage situation and suggests they could take a human hostage, but Masklin does not think the plan will work. The lorry returns and Masklin climbs down to the lorry. He finds Angalo's jacket, but Angalo himself is not on board.
10	"Searching the Store"	13 March 1992
The Duke is distressed at the disappearance of his son. Although he still does not believe in an Outside, he agrees to help Masklin, as he feels it might lead him to Angalo. Vinto finds a copy of Alice's Adventures in Wonderland and convinces the other nomes to search the store for a bottle of "Drink Me" to make the nomes grow bigger. Angalo finally returns on another lorry, saying he saw the store from the Outside. The store has a number of closing down signs in the windows.
11	"Angalo's Return"	20 March 1992
Angalo recounts how he got out of the lorry to go to the toilet, but before he could get back in, the lorry drove away, so he had to wait a long time for another Arnold Bros. lorry to come by. He also learned how to drive a lorry, making detailed notes of the controls. He tells Masklin that the gears are many times larger than a nome, and they realise that it will be impossible for the nomes to operate the lorry without help. Vinto brings a book of Gulliver's Travels to Masklin, hoping to convince him to kidnap a human to help them, but Masklin instead sees the ropes holding Gulliver down and believes that they can use ropes to operate the lorry. Vinto discovers that, instead of the two weeks they thought they had, the demolition has already started.
12	"The Great Escape"	27 March 1992
The Thing advises the nomes to get out of the store as soon as possible. Although demolition is still 14 days away, humans have started to clear the building and load the store fittings onto a lorry. Dorcas tells Masklin that he has disabled the loading bay door so the lorry can't leave. The Thing tells Masklin that there is an airport to the north and they should head to it, then it falls silent and leaves Masklin on his own. Masklin becomes overwhelmed by his task, but Grimma encourages him to lead the nomes out of the store. The nomes get into a lorry and begin to practice using the rope and pulley system Dorcas designed to drive the lorry. They start the lorry and begin to move, but they move backwards, not forwards, and crash into a petrol drum which tips over and spills. Prices Slashed comes to investigate, smoking a cigarette. Angelo tells the nomes that if there is a single spark the spilled fuel will explode.
13	"So Near and Yet So Far"	3 April 1992
Prices Slashed sees Gurder stood in the lorry angrily denouncing the 'Demon', and is startled into dropping his lighted cigarette into the petrol. With no time for Dorcas to fix the door, the lorry crashes through it moments before the petrol ignites and causes an explosion. They stop a short way down the street to see the store on fire. They drive off and, after a number of close calls, a police car begins pursuing them. The first scene of the first episode then repeats, this time showing Masklin and Dorcas cutting the police car's wiring while the nomes in the truck hide. The lorry comes to a stop in an abandoned quarry near an airport. Masklin tells the others that they must move on at some point and try to get home. As they watch Concorde fly over, Dorcas remarks that it would be easier to drive than a lorry because it only has three wheels. This episode is dedicated to the memory of Paul Simpson.

== Cast ==
- Masklin — Joe McGann
- Grimma — Debra Gillett
- Granny Morkie, Baroness Del Icatessen — Rosalie Williams
- Torrit, Count De Ironmongri – John Jardine
- The Thing — Edward Kelsey
- Angalo De Haberdasheri – Nigel Carrington
- Duke De Haberdasheri – David Scase
- Dorcas — Brian Trueman
- The Abbot — Michael Hordern
- Gurder — Brian Southwood
- Mr Mert, Vinto Pimmie — Jimmy Hibbert
- Dave the Policeman — Rob Rackstraw

== Crew ==
- Directed by Jackie Cockle, Francis Vose, Chris Taylor (each episode had one director)
- Produced by Jackie Cockle
- Executive producer: John Hambley
- Adapted by Brian Trueman
- Edited by Zyggy Markiewicz
- Music: Colin Towns
- Film editor: Zyggy Markiewicz
- Assistant film editors: Stephen Perry, Jane Hicks
- Music editor: Garry Hardman

== Novelisation ==
The series was made into a short hardcover book published by Ladybird Press in 1992. The book included colour photos from the series.
