= Bomber (TV series) =

- Genre: Thriller
- Created by: Leslie Grantham
- Written by: Rob Heyland
- Directed by: David Drury
- Starring: Mark Strong; Andrew Lincoln; Esther Hall; Teresa Churcher; Isabel Brook; Andy Rashleigh; Rufus Wright; Donald Douglas
- Composer: Alan Parker
- Country of origin: United Kingdom
- Original language: English
- No. of series: 1
- No. of episodes: 2

Production
- Executive producer: Adrian Bate
- Producer: Archie Tate
- Cinematography: Dominic Clemence
- Editor: Ian Farr
- Running time: 90 minutes
- Production company: Zenith Entertainment

Original release
- Network: ITV
- Release: 5 January – 6 January 2000

Bomber is a two-part British television miniseries, written by Rob Heyland, that first broadcast on ITV on 5 January 2000. The series, based on an idea by Leslie Grantham, stars Mark Strong and Andrew Lincoln as the leaders of a group of bomb disposal experts working for the British Army. The series was produced by Zenith Entertainment, in collaboration with Archie Tate productions.

Series writer Rob Heyland said that several years prior to transmission, the series would not have been possible. "I don't think I would have had access to the EOD [Explosive Ordnance Disposal] people for a start. They were incredibly sweet and accommodating and quite amused by the idea of a tubby idiot coming in and saying, 'I'm going to write a story about you.' I spent a lot of time with them, I watched them training and I got all sorts of information that, previously, you would have had to be John Pilger to get access to."

Due to the sensitive nature of the programme title, the series was not broadcast in Ireland, instead being replaced in the schedules by Die Hard with a Vengeance. The first episode gathered an audience of 7.62 million viewers. The series was released on VHS in Japan in 2001; currently remaining the only home video release worldwide. However, in 2017, Simply Media acquired the rights to the series, suggesting a possible DVD release in 2018.

== Cast ==
- Mark Strong as Col. Chris Forsyth
- Andrew Lincoln as Capt. Willy Byrne
- Esther Hall as Capt. Charlie Weekly
- Teresa Churcher as Jane Smith
- Isabel Brook as Lucy Whelan
- Andy Rashleigh as DCS Brian Brannigan
- Rufus Wright as Capt. Hugh Smith
- Donald Douglas as Alfred Smith
- Jan Carey as Mary Smith
- Geraldine Alexander as Rose Forsyth
- David Hounslow as Maj. Spencer
- Denzil Kilvington as Desmond Dohenry
- Ieuan Rhys as Cpl. Owens
- Ian Peck as LCpl. Phillips
- Tim Treloar as Cpl. Sorrento
- William Whymper as Gen. Harris
- Luke Shaw as David McGarry
- Russell Bright as Kevin Prescott
- Sally Carman as Bridget Salsabill
- Gareth Forwood as Hilary Quentin
- Nick Whitfield as Pierre Pfieffer
- Bob Mercer as DC Dempsey

== Episodes ==
No.	Title	Directed by	Written by	Original release date
1	"Episode 1"	David Drury	Rob Heyland	5 January 2000
Colonel Chris Forsyth (Mark Strong) and his Explosive Ordnance Disposal Squad are battling against an animal liberation bombing campaign, which results in the death of one of their colleagues. But after the suspected bombers are discovered and arrested, the campaign mysteriously continues.
2	"Episode 2"	David Drury	Rob Heyland	6 January 2000
Colonel Forsyth realises that a serial bomber is targeting the squad, and that his own family could be in grave danger.
