= Tim Killick =

English television and theatre actor

Timothy Edward Killick (born August 15 1958 in Boston, Lincolnshire, UK) is an English television and theatre actor.

== Early life ==
His parents were Elizabeth Drew and Edward Killick, the son of Reginald Killick of 'Park Lea', 85 Norfolk Street, in Boston, who had a shop at 81 High St. Reginald died March 1984. Elizabeth Drew was from Claygate in Surrey. His parents married in March 1957. He was born on August 15 1958 at Wyberton West Hospital. His sister was born on November 18 1959 in Germany.

He was educated at Bootham School in York and the University of Nottingham.

He is the older brother of theatre director Jenny Killick and BBC's Cathy Killick.

== Personal life ==
He married actress Kate Gielgud, whose grandfather Val Gielgud CBE (1900-81), was the brother of Sir John Gielgud, on April 27 1991 at St James Piccadilly.

== Filmography ==
- Without a Clue (1988)
- Erik the Viking (1989)

== TV credits ==
- Auf Wiedersehen, Pet
- Hard Cases
- Further Up Pompeii
- Bergerac
- Lovejoy
- Covington Cross
- Ivanhoe
- Dangerfield
- Children of the New Forest
