= Rosalie Williams =

English actress (1919–2009)

- Born: 12 June 1919; Barton upon Irwell, Lancashire, England
- Died: 11 December 2009 (aged 90); Manchester, England
- Spouse: David Scase (m. 1945; died 2003)
- Children: 4

Rosalie Williams (12 June 1919 – 11 December 2009) was an English actress best known for her appearance as Mrs. Hudson in The Adventures of Sherlock Holmes television series produced by Granada Television from 1984 until 1994 alongside Jeremy Brett, David Burke, Edward Hardwicke, and Colin Jeavons.

Rosalie Williams also appeared as Mrs Lacey, Mrs Rimmer and Mrs Sowerbutts in Coronation Street, an award-winning British soap opera (March 1978 to 1991), and as Mary in 10 episodes of Flambards (1979).

Her husband, actor David Scase, died in 2003. They had four children, Annabel Scase (born 1948), George Rory Scase (1954–2019) - both of whom were actors and both of whom appeared in episodes in the British television series Coronation Street and twins Jo and Kate Scase, born in 1963.

== Credits ==
Williams has the following credits to her name:

- The Memoirs of Sherlock Holmes – Mrs Hudson (6 episodes; 1994)
- Dancing Queen (1993) (TV) – Lily
- The Casebook of Sherlock Holmes – Mrs Hudson (5 episodes; 1991–93)
- Truckers (1992) TV Series (voice) – Gran'ma Morkie/Baroness of Delicacy
- The Beiderbecke Connection (1988) TV mini-series – Miss Pringle
- Casualty – Mary Payton (1 episode; 1988)
- The Return of Sherlock Holmes – Mrs Hudson (7 episodes; 1986–88)
- The Adventures of Sherlock Holmes – Mrs Hudson (8 episodes; 1984–85)
- Coronation Street – Mrs Rimmer (3 episodes; 1978–1985)
- A Different Kind of Love (1985) – Dinner Guest
- How We Used To Live – Bessie (1 episode; 1984)
- The Outsider – Irene Jefford (1 episode, 1983)
- Juliet Bravo – Ann Lambert (2 episodes; 1981–83)
- ITV Playhouse – Mrs Foster (2 episodes; 1977–82)
- Hedda Gabler (1981) (TV) – Berthe
- The Sandbaggers – English Lady (1 episode; 1980)
- The Dick Francis Thriller: The Racing Game – Mrs. Dysart (1 episode; 1979)
- Flambards (1979) TV mini-series – Mary
- Crown Court (1 episode; 1973)
- Getting Away from It All (1972) (TV) – Rose Malone
- Open Window (1972) – Emily
- Paper Roses (1971) (TV) – Neighbour
- Softly Softly – Mrs Thomas (1 episode; 1968)
- Z-Cars – Mrs Pearson (1 episode; 1965)
- The Younger Generation – Mrs Sayers (1 episode; 1961)
