= David Scase =

British actor (1919–2003)

- Born: 21 September 1919; Fulham, London, England
- Died: 27 February 2003 (aged 83)
- Occupations: Theatre director; actor
- Spouse: Rosalie Williams (m. 1945)
- Children: Annabel, Rory, Josephine, Katharine

David Scase (21 September 1919 – 27 February 2003) was a British theatre director and actor.

Born at Fulham, London, as the son of a bricklayer, his first job was in a bicycle factory in the mid-1930s. He joined the Merchant Navy on the outbreak of World War II in 1939, but by the end of the war was working as a BBC sound engineer. He then joined Joan Littlewood's Theatre Workshop in Manchester and served as a stage manager, before moving to directing. He ran the Manchester Library Theatre, which he made into one of the most prestigious repertory theatres in the country, from the late 1950s until the 1970s. He gave actors such as Patrick Stewart, Martin Jarvis, and many other household names, their first jobs.

Following minor television roles between 1948 and 1965, he began to act on a regular basis during the 1970s, beginning with an appearance in a 1972 episode of Holly. Minor roles in shows including The Nearly Man, ITV Playhouse, Flambards and Fallen Hero followed later on in the decade.

In 1984, in his 65th year, he landed his first regular television role, in How We Used to Live, with five appearances as George Holyrood. From 1984 to 1987, he appeared as Hilda Ogden's friend Dr Lowther in Coronation Street. In 1989, he appeared in two episodes of Judith Krantz's Till We Meet Again.

Scase retired from acting in 1992, having voiced the Duke in Truckers (stop motion animation adaptation of the Terry Pratchett book) early in the year, and finally appearing as an Art Gallery Owner in The Case-Book of Sherlock Holmes: The Master Blackmailer.

He died in February 2003, at the age of 83.

He was married to actress Rosalie Williams for 58 years until his death. She outlived him, as did their four children.

== Awards ==
In 2004, he was posthumously awarded the Horniman Award (named after Annie Horniman) at the Manchester Evening News Theatre Awards, for his "unique contribution to the theatrical life of the region":

"Skilled as a sound engineer and stage manager, as well as a much-admired director and actor, he balanced radical idealism with commercial flair and had a brilliant eye for the genius of young actors. The careers of Robert Stephens, Richard Griffiths, Patrick Stewart, Alan Rickman and Anthony Hopkins might all have been very different had David not noticed and encouraged them. He helped to establish the Library Theatre and thus Manchester itself as a beacon of excellence in regional, nay world, theatre."

== Selected filmography ==
- Never Look Back (1952)
