= Freda Kelsall =

Freda Margaret Kelsall (born April 1938 in Southport, Lancashire, England) is a British writer, theatre director and former teacher who is best known as the main writer (1975–1996; occasionally also a presenter in the last few of those years) of the schools television series How We Used To Live.

== Early career ==
In the 1960s, she was a schoolteacher in London and had a novel published. In this period she appeared in epilogues for Rediffusion, the then ITV franchise holder; in October 1967, when she was "just starting a teaching career", she contributed to a series of epilogues on religious education and also discussed a number of books in similar epilogues under the title 'Outlook and Insight', for example William Mayne's Earthfasts, Ivan Southall's To the Wild Sky and Mollie Hunter's The Kelpie's Pearls.

== Later career ==
In 1970, Kelsall moved to Alresford, Hampshire, where she initially continued her teaching career, also inspiring Colin Firth to begin his acting career. In 1980, heavily committed to work for Yorkshire Television, she briefly moved to Leeds and then in 1982, to Heptonstall, just outside Hebden Bridge where she founded the Bridge Theatre Company in 1987, and ran it for many years. She continued to direct plays for this company until at least 2006. On 31 March 1981, her play The Reason of Things, produced by YTV, was networked by ITV. In 1982, she wrote the script for an episode of The Agatha Christie Hour. She had two further plays networked in 1984, Sweet Echo on 22 January, produced by Yorkshire, and Grand Duo on 29 July, produced by LWT. Her play The Index Has Gone Fishing, made by Central Television and filmed in Pershore, Worcestershire, was networked by ITV on 28 June 1987. In 1987 she wrote an episode of the BBC drama series One by One. She also wrote six episodes of Emmerdale Farm in the spring of 1981, and six further episodes that autumn. Her most recent television work credited by the British Film Institute consists of three episodes of Heartbeat in the mid-1990s.

She is also the author of a number of books based around How We Used to Live, and of a number of stage plays which have appeared in print. In 2010, she presented a retrospective of the How We Used to Live series at Hebden Bridge's 500th anniversary festival. In December 2017, she spoke to a local history society on the history of her home.
