= The Silent Fall =

- Directed by: Roger Hawkins
- Release date: January 1, 2007
- Country: South Africa
- Language: English

The Silent Fall is a 2007 South African drama film set in and around Cape Town, focusing on the AIDS problem of Africa. The film was directed by Roger Hawkins.

== Plot ==
The story is set in motion after the brutal murder of a South African doctor who is on the brink of discovering a break through generic AIDS drug. If found to be successful, the cost-effective drug could cripple pharmaceutical giant, the Kingdom Corporation. The story explodes into a web of intrigue and danger as Kingdom's role in the doctor's death is brought into question. This, and a continent in the grips of a heartless pandemic, provide the dramatic backdrop against which heroine Dr. Thandie Khumalo's personal journey unfolds. She struggles to come to terms with her beloved colleague's murder and the loss of her friends and family to the pandemic which she has dedicated her life to fighting. Vying for her heart and mind as she searches for the truth are Lucas De Villiers, the charming yet ruthless CEO of Kingdom, and handsome fellow doctor Josh Kingsley.

== Cast ==
- Miles Anderson as Joseph Kingsley
- Leon Clingman as Edward Graham
- Aaliyah Madyun as Thandie Khumalo
- Matthew Rutherford as Lucas Devilliers
- Justin Smith as Josh Kingsley
