= Every Woman Knows a Secret =

- Genre: Drama
- Based on: Every Woman Knows a Secret by Rosie Thomas
- Written by: William Humble
- Directed by: Paul Seed
- Starring: Siobhan Redmond; Paul Bettany; Miles Anderson; Danny Erskine; Claire Cox; Serena Evans; Tom Chadbon; Jolyon Baker
- Composer: Nigel Hess
- Country of origin: United Kingdom
- Original language: English
- No. of series: 1
- No. of episodes: 3

Production
- Executive producer: Charles Hubbard
- Producer: Brian Eastman
- Running time: 60 minutes
- Production company: Carnival Films

Original release
- Network: ITV
- Release: 18 March – 1 April 1999

Every Woman Knows a Secret is a 1999 British television drama series written by William Humble based on the 1996 novel of the same name by Rosie Thomas. The series aired on ITV from 18 March to 1 April 1999 is both set and filmed in Berkshire.

The series was later released on Region 1 DVD in the United States, although it remains unavailable on home media in the United Kingdom.

== Plot ==
The series stars Siobhan Redmond as Jess, a woman whose son Danny dies in a drunk driving crash.

== Cast ==
- Siobhan Redmond as Jess
- Paul Bettany as Rob
- Miles Anderson as Ian
- Claire Cox as Beth
- Serena Evans as Lizzie
- Tom Chadbon as James
- Jolyon Baker as Samantha
- Danny Erskine as Prison Boy
- Sarah Grochala as Nurse
- Sam Loggin as Catherine

== Episodes ==
No.	Title	Directed by	Written by	Airdate	UK viewers (million)
1	"Episode 1"	Paul Seed	William Humble	18 March 1999	6.54
2	"Episode 2"	Paul Seed	William Humble	25 March 1999	6.06
3	"Episode 3"	Paul Seed	William Humble	1 April 1999	5.65
