= Heather James =

British television actress

Heather James (also known as Heather Moray) is a British television actress. She has appeared in a number of television series including Cribb, The Black Tower, One by One, Columbo, and New Tricks.
