= Lesley Vickerage =

English actress (born 1961)

- Born: July 1, 1961 (age 64); Woolwich, London, England
- Occupation: Actress
- Years active: 1992–present

Lesley Francesca Vickerage (born Woolwich, 1961) is an English actress best known for her roles as WPC Jenny Dean in the television series Between the Lines, as Lieutenant (later Captain) Kate Butler in Soldier Soldier, as Helen Lynley in the television series The Inspector Lynley Mysteries, and as Aunt Jane in the television series Moonfleet.

== Early years ==
The daughter of John B. Vickerage, a company director, and his wife Christine Akers, Vickerage grew up in Kidbrooke, Greenwich. Her desire to be an actress began when she was a girl. She said, "My parents were both frustrated actors, and I used to go to Saturday morning drama classes."

== Career ==
Before she became an actress, Vickerage was a secretary and at one time worked for the head of BBC drama. She also sang in the Middle East. In the late 1980s, she trained at Drama Studio London, graduating in 1989 with a commendation which was reported in The Stage.

On stage, between 1990 and 1991 Vickerage appeared in David Hines's Bondage, playing a prostitute who prowls the streets around King's Cross looking for customers, wearing a white mac over black lace underwear. A reviewer found that "she convincingly mimes dejected pathos, plucky humour, and lip-furled disgust."

On screen, she had a walk on part in 1991 in King Ralph as a woman in the shop near the end of the film. From 1992 to 1994 she appeared in Soldier Soldier as Second Lieutenant (later Lieutenant, and then Captain) Kate Butler (later Voce). She was Ellie in My Good Friend (1995), Viv Casey in Grafters (1998–1999), Helen Lynley in The Inspector Lynley Mysteries (2001–2004), and the space pilot Vornholt in the BBC series Bugs. She has also appeared in episodes of The Bill, Silent Witness, Sea of Souls, Inspector Morse, Holby City, Law & Order: UK, Midsomer Murders, Doctors, Lewis, My Family, The Murder Room and Between the Lines. She played Liz in Friday Night Dinner and Katherine Dutta in the Inspector Lewis episode "Down Amongst the Fearful" (2013).

Vickerage was scheduled to appear in the Salisbury Playhouse production of Ira Levin's play Deathtrap in February 2016.
