= Teresa Churcher =

English actress

Teresa Churcher (born 7 January) is an English actress whose film credits include Gosford Park, Roman Polanski's Oliver Twist, Being Julia, Creation and The Woman in Black.

Churcher was born in St Albans, Hertfordshire.

Churcher graduated with a Drama Diploma (honours) and the award for Most Promising Student from a London drama school in the mid-1990s. She began her career on the London stage playing Olga in Three Sisters, Agnes in Agnes of God and Sue Murray in The Truth Game.

Television roles followed in Casualty and Kavanagh QC before Churcher landed the lead role in the ITV drama Bomber. Her performance gained her positive reviews and the part of Bertha, the 'naughty' kitchen maid, in Robert Altman's Gosford Park, for which she received a Screen Actors Guild Award. Film roles followed in Being Julia, as Charlotte in Roman Polanski's Oliver Twist, in Creation and The Woman in Black. Churcher has continued to appear in television shows such as Spooks, Agatha Christie's Poirot, The Last Detective, Holby City and Garrow's Law, as well as the television films of Ballet Shoes, Colditz and Belonging, amongst others.

Churcher returned to the stage in 2009 to play the lead role of Jane in The Girls of Slender Means at The Assembly Rooms, Edinburgh, gaining a Stage Award for Acting Excellence nomination.

== Selected filmography ==
- Desert Flower (2009)
