= International Zoo Veterinary Group =

The International Zoo Veterinary Group (IZVG) is a freelance zoological veterinary practice founded in 1976 by U.K. veterinarian David Taylor and his partner, Andrew Greenwood, who is an expert in wildlife conservation. The organization provides services and resources for wildlife veterinarians and is located in the United Kingdom.

== History ==
The International Zoo Veterinary Group was created by two veterinarians, Dr. David Taylor and Dr. Andrew Greenwood. They were both known in the UK as wildlife/zoo veterinarians, working to provide better care for many animals.

Taylor grew up in Rochdale, Lancashire, but went to Glasgow Veterinary School in 1951. In 1958, he returned to Lancashire, joining the Rochdale practice, where he remained a partner until 1968. By chance, the Rochdale practice had traditionally provided veterinary care for the animals at Manchester's Belle Vue Zoological Gardens. David became a consultant for the Gardens until 1976, when the zoo closed.

Greenwood studied veterinary medicine at the University of Cambridge, where he specialized in conservation medicine, focusing on birds, reptiles, and marine mammals. He also co-founded the Wildlife Vets International (WVI) (see under "Partnerships").

IZVG was born from Billy Smart's Circus, which purchased the St. Leopard's estate, which became the Windsor Safari Park. There, Taylor and Greenwood were appointed as the veterinary surgeons on the estate. As time progressed, IZVG acted as the official vet for the Association of Circus Proprietors of Great Britain (ACP) as well as the Great British Circus. This time, allowed Taylor and Greenwood to draft the ACP's guidelines on animal welfare and to institute its voluntary veterinary inspections. Their guidelines continue to be observed by all British circuses of note within this association, and IZVG was always on call to attend any problems experienced in the welfare of their animals. Now, IZVG no longer works with the British circuses and instead focuses on wildlife medicine.

== Organizational Focus ==
=== Services and Resources ===
While IZVG was born from work with the circus industry, it eventually became an independent group of wildlife veterinarians providing freelance care to zoos, aquariums, and conservation projects worldwide. IZVG works with other zoos, parks, and aquariums to treat wild and endangered species. IZVG offers a multitude of services, including, but not limited to, regular clinical services, working alongside local practices or as standalone services; animal pathology services; advice on enclosure design and collection planning; and zoo licensing assessments. These services are provided for a wide range of species, from exotic to wild, and even fish. As IZVG progressed, the services it provided expanded globally, providing veterinary aid for conservation projects in countries such as Nigeria, Russia, Paraguay, and the Caribbean.

=== Research ===
The pathology division is a unique service provided by the IZVG. As with their other services, they study the effects of disease on animals in zoos, exotic wildlife, and aquarium species. In addition, they provide gross post-mortem examinations and histopathology to clients, other diagnostic laboratories, and specialist and first-opinion veterinary practices.

They also publish research papers that provide relevant data on current or soon-to-be-current areas of interest in wildlife conservation.

=== Partnerships ===
IZVG has gone on to partner with other organizations that need support, like Wildlife Vets International (WVI), which was co-founded by Dr. Andrew Greenwood. IZVG and WVI were partners for about 16 years, from 2004 to 2020, until WVI became an independent organization. The partnership enabled both to provide more intensive, specialized veterinary expertise for conservation and to conduct expert health assessments for endangered species projects. Furthermore, their partnership leveraged specialized skills to support international field projects, such as reintroduction programs for big cats.
