= Covington Cross =

1992 television series

- Title screenshot
- Also known as: Charring Cross
- Genre: Adventure
- Created by: Gil Grant
- Written by: Beverly Bridges; Chris Ruppenthal
- Directed by: William Dear; Alister Hallum
- Starring: Nigel Terry; Cherie Lunghi; James Faulkner; Jonathan Firth; Glenn Quinn; Ione Skye
- Composer: Carl Davis
- Countries of origin: United States; United Kingdom
- Original language: English
- No. of seasons: 1
- No. of episodes: 13 (6 unaired in U.S.)

Production
- Executive producer: Gil Grant
- Production locations: Allington Castle, Maidstone, Kent, England
- Running time: 60 minutes
- Production company: Reeves Entertainment

Original release
- Network: ABC
- Release: August 25 – October 31, 1992

Covington Cross is a television series that was broadcast on ABC in the United States from August 25 to October 31, 1992. The series was created by Gil Grant, who was also executive producer. The pilot episode also aired in the United Kingdom, six days after its American broadcast. The series was filmed and produced in the UK, by a British production company, but it was ultimately accountable to an American television network.

== Premise ==
Set in 14th-century England, the series follows the daily intrigues of Sir Thomas Grey, a widower, and his sons and daughter. Covington Cross is the name of Sir Thomas' castle. His children are oldest son, Armus; the serious Richard; free spirited Cedric; and strong-willed daughter, Eleanor. Another son, William, appeared in the pilot episode, but was then directed by the program's writers to fight in the Crusades. Also featuring in Sir Thomas's life is his love interest, Lady Elizabeth.

== Characters ==
- Sir Thomas Grey – Nigel Terry
- Lady Elizabeth – Cherie Lunghi
- William Grey – Ben Porter (pilot episode)
- Armus Grey – Tim Killick (except not in pilot)
- Richard Grey – Jonathan Firth
- Cedric Grey – Glenn Quinn
- Eleanor Grey – Ione Skye
- Baron John Mullens – James Faulkner
- Friar – Paul Brooke
- Alexandra Mullens (semi-regular) – Laura Howard
- King Edward (semi-regular) – Miles Anderson

== Production and broadcast ==
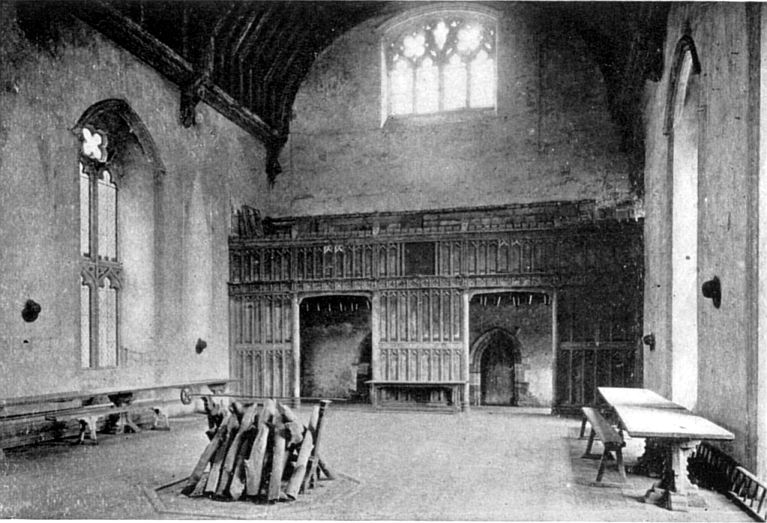
The Great Hall at Penshurst Place, c. 1915

Thirteen episodes were produced, but only seven aired in the United States after ABC pulled the series from the air in November 1992. The series was an expensive show to produce, thanks to overseas production costs. Most of the cast and crew were British. Once, the show was preempted when its timeslot was bought by businessman Ross Perot for infomercials in an attempt to raise his poll numbers during his independent run for president.

According to a Los Angeles Times article, it was "one of the few American prime-time shows ever to be shot entirely on location in England", with much of the filming was done in and around castles in the English countryside. Allington Castle was used for the exterior scenes, while Penshurst Place in Kent were used for the interior scenes. The village set was filmed at Shepperton Studios, and it was later reused in the sixth season of British television series Red Dwarf as the Gelf village in the episode "Emohawk: Polymorph II".

The pilot episode also aired in the United Kingdom, six days after its American broadcast, but the remainder of the series was not shown there, although it was originally intended that the full series would air in Britain in 1993. The program was also broadcast in Ireland in 1994, and in France in 1993 on M6.

== Episodes ==
No.	Title	Directed by	Original release date
1	"Pilot"	William Dear	August 25, 1992
2	"Armus Returns"	James Keach	September 19, 1992
3	"Outlaws"	James Keach	September 26, 1992
4	"Cedric Hits the Road"	Les Landon	October 3, 1992
5	"The Hero"	Les Landon	October 10, 1992
6	"Blinded Passions"	Joe Napolitano	October 24, 1992
7	"The Persecution"	Francis Megahy	October 31, 1992
8	"Eviction"	Joe Napolitano	Unaired
9	"The Trial"	Herbert Wise	Unaired
10	"The Plague"	Peter Sasdy	Unaired
11	"Revenge"	Alister Hallum	Unaired
12	"Celebration"	Herbert Wise	Unaired
13	"Brothers"	Ian Toynton	Unaired

== Reception ==
The show received mixed critical notice. Howard Rosenberg of Los Angeles Times was muted in his review of the show, describing it as a "pleasing, though occasionally plodding costume drama" that "brings a droll, self-mocking sense of humor to its Middle Ages saga." Todd Everett of Variety praised the show for having "lots of color, production values and a script that doesn't take itself too seriously", further noting that "all tech credits are first rate, with a special nod to costume designer Barbara Lane." However Entertainment Weekly found the show "ludicrous". Tom Shales gave Covington Cross a negative review, declaring that "the show plays like a Mel Brooks spoof minus the spoofing". Shales added "Most of the young characters behave like spoiled tots plucked from the '90s and teleported back through the centuries... In other words, the series is historical drama in name only. It's really "Covington Cross, 90210"."
