= Miles Anderson =

Zimbabwean actor (born 1947)

- Born: 23 October 1947 (age 79); Southern Rhodesia
- Occupation: Actor
- Spouse: Bella Merlin
- Children: 2

Miles Anderson (born 23 October 1947) is a Rhodesian/Zimbabwean-British actor.

He has appeared in television serials in the United Kingdom and in North America. He appeared as Alistair, the photographer, in the film La La Land. In 2021, he played Lennox in Joel Coen's The Tragedy of Macbeth with Denzel Washington and Frances McDormand. He is commonly remembered in the UK for his role as Lieutenant-Colonel Dan Fortune in ITV television show Soldier Soldier from 1991 to 1992.

Born in 1947 in Southern Rhodesia, now Zimbabwe, Anderson was educated at Prince Edward School. His father was Major-General J. Anderson, the commander of the Southern Rhodesian Army who was dismissed in 1964 because of his opposition to the colonial government's plans for denial of native African rule upon independence. His mother, Daphne, wrote The Toerags, a memoir of her difficult childhood in Rhodesia.

Anderson has appeared in the US television series Criminal Minds, as well as the UK series Ultimate Force, in which he played Colonel Aidan Dempsey. He had previously played Lieutenant-Colonel Dan Fortune in ITV's Soldier Soldier (series 1 and 2 only).

He received the 1982 Critics' Circle Theatre Award for Best Supporting Actor of 1981 for his performances in The Twin Rivals and The Witch of Edmonton, and an Olivier Nomination for his performance as Sigismund in Calderon's Life's a Dream at the Royal Shakespeare Company. His numerous performances for television include Fall of Eagles, Z-Cars, The Sweeney, Campion, House of Cards, Oliver's Travels, Every Woman Knows a Secret and Holby City. Anderson has also appeared in two episodes of Midsomer Murders, "Death In Disguise" and "Last Year's Model", and was the voice of Poseidon in the 1997 TV adaptation of The Odyssey.

Anderson was seen as Major Marchbanks in the BBC adaptation of Philip Pullman's The Ruby in the Smoke and, in 2007, he appeared in the sixth series of the crime-drama Waking the Dead. In 2008, he made a brief appearance as Edward Tunstall in the BBC's EastEnders. He also narrated the Sky1 version of the New Zealand documentary The Lion Man and appeared in an episode of A Touch of Frost.

In 2010, Anderson appeared as the title character in The Madness of George III mounted by director Adrian Noble at San Diego's Old Globe Theatre. He won the San Diego's Critics' Circle award for Best Actor. In 2011, he played Prospero in The Tempest and Salieri in Amadeus, both directed by Noble. In 2013, he again won the San Diego Critic's Circle Award for his Shylock in Adrian Noble's production of Shakespeare's The Merchant of Venice.

In 2015, Anderson appeared as Renard in the BBC TV series The Musketeers (episode 2.5, "The Return"). His film credits include roles in The Thirty Nine Steps (1978), The Shillingbury Blowers (1980), Sky Bandits (1986) and Cry Freedom.

Anderson is an associate member of RADA. He is the father of actor Joe Anderson and chef Max Anderson.

== Filmography ==
=== Film ===
| Year | Title | Role | Notes |
|---|---|---|---|
| 1974 | Who Killed Lamb? | P.C. Hanworth | TV film |
| 1978 | The Thirty Nine Steps | David Hamilton | |
| 1980 | The Shillingbury Blowers | Mr. Fennel | TV film |
| 1986 | Sky Bandits | Bannock | |
| 1987 | Cry Freedom | Lemick | |
| 1988 | The Zero Option | Major Fredericks | |
| 1990 | Lorna Doorne | Tom Faggus | TV film |
| 1993 | A Far Off Place | Jardin | |
| 1996 | In Your Dreams | Prosecution Counsel | TV film |
| 1997 | Into the Blue | Dr. Peter Kingdom | TV film |
| 1998 | Riddler's Moon | Ernie | TV film |
| 1999 | Fast Food | Dwayne | |
| 1999 | Winter Angel | Toby Ross | TV film |
| 2000 | The King Is Alive | Jack | |
| 2002 | The Biographer | Newspaper Editor | TV film |
| 2006 | The Ruby in the Smoke | Major Marchbanks | TV film |
| 2007 | The Silent Fall | Joseph Kingsley | |
| 2009 | Ninja | Temple | |
| 2012 | Delicate Playthings | Terrence Boyd | |
| 2013 | Vishwaroopam | Dr. Dawkins | |
| 2015 | The Sound of Magic | Abdumeeni Habduleeni | |
| 2016 | La La Land | Alistair | |
| 2018 | When I Sing | Rocker | |
| 2018 | The Wind | The Reverend | |
| 2019 | Radioflash | Farmer Glenn | |
| 2021 | The Tragedy of Macbeth | Lennox | |

=== Television ===
| Year | Title | Role | Notes |
|---|---|---|---|
| 1973 | Beryl's Lot | 1st Student | 2 episodes |
| 1974 | Fall of Eagles | Young Franz Josef of Austria-Hungary | Episode: "Death Waltz" |
| 1974 | Cloud Burst | Dick Turner | Series regular |
| 1975 | Z-Cars | Tim Austin | Episode: "Intervention" |
| 1975 | Churchill's People | Reverend Dr. Walker | Episode: "The Derry Boys" |
| 1975 | Private Affairs | Jack Smythe | Episode: "Husband to Mrs. Fitzherbert" |
| 1975 | The Legend of Robin Hood | Will Scarlett | Miniseries |
| 1978 | People Like Us | Ted Hartnell | Miniseries |
| 1978 | Crown Court | Louis Botha | Episode: "Soft Target" |
| 1978 | The Sweeney | Hawkins | Episode: "Hearts and Minds" |
| 1980 | Shillingbury Tales | Mr. Fennel | Episode: "The Shillingbury Blowers" |
| 1986 | That Uncertain Feeling | Paul Whetstone | Miniseries |
| 1986 | What If It's Raining | Philip | Miniseries |
| 1986 | Call Me Mister | Ben Fisher | Episode: "Running Time" |
| 1988 | Campaign | Paul Copeland | Miniseries |
| 1990 | Campion | Anthony Datchett | Episode: "Mystery Mile" |
| 1990 | House of Cards | Roger O'Neill | Miniseries |
| 1991–1992 | Soldier Soldier | Lieutenant-Colonel Dan Fortune | Series regular |
| 1992 | The Young Indiana Jones Chronicles | Giscard | Episode: "Somme, Early August 1916" |
| 1992 | The Ruth Rendell Mysteries | Mark Simms | Episode: "Talking to Strange Men" |
| 1992 | Covington Cross | King Edward | 3 episodes |
| 1993 | Seekers | Peter Draycott | 1 episode |
| 1993 | All in the Game | Derek Horsfield | Miniseries |
| 1994 | Peak Practice | Dominic Jenkins | Episode: "Old Habits" |
| 1994 | The Rector's Wife | Patrick O'Sullivan | Miniseries |
| 1994 | Class Act | Mickey Clive | 1 episode |
| 1994 | Moving Story | Barry | Episode: "Father's Day" |
| 1995 | Chiller | Peter Walker | Episode: "The Man Who Didn't Believe in Ghosts" |
| 1995 | Oliver's Travels | Baron Kite | Miniseries |
| 1997 | Casualty | Andy McKenzie | Episode: "Treasure" |
| 1997 | A Touch of Frost | Sir Richard Cordwell | Episode: "Penny for the Guy" |
| 1997 | Have Your Cake and Eat It | Sam Dawson | Miniseries |
| 1997 | The Odyssey | Poseidon | Miniseries |
| 1998 | The Scold's Bridle | Detective Inspector Harmer | 2 episodes |
| 1998 | A Certain Justice | Mark Rawlstone | 2 episodes |
| 1998 | Dangerfield | Bailey | Episode: "Harvest Time" |
| 1998 | Midsomer Murders | Guy Gamelin | Episode: "Death in Disguise" |
| 1999 | Wing and a Prayer | Charles Hudson | 1 episode |
| 1999 | Every Woman Knows a Secret | Ian | Miniseries |
| 2001 | Family Affairs | George Shackleford | 3 episodes |
| 2002–2003 | Holby City | Terry Fox | Series regular |
| 2002–2006 | Ultimate Force | Colonel Aidan Dempsey | Series regular |
| 2004 | Down to Earth | Adam Cannock | Episode: "Fate and Fortune" |
| 2005 | William and Mary | Lord Narrington | 1 episode |
| 2005 | The Bill | Roland O'Brian | Episode: "Double Jeopardy" |
| 2006 | Midsomer Murders | Lance Woodrow | Episode: "Last Year's Model" |
| 2006 | Masterpiece | Major Marchbanks | Episode: "The Ruby in the Smoke" |
| 2006 | Doctors | Terry Warner | Episode: "A Golfer's Tale" |
| 2007 | Waking the Dead | Daniel Lennon | Episode: "Double Bind" |
| 2007 | The Time of Your Life | Phil | Miniseries |
| 2008 | EastEnders | Edward | 3 episodes |
| 2008 | The Bill | Bob Gatting | Episode: "Gun Runner" |
| 2009 | Criminal Minds | Dr. Nichols | Episode: "Amplification" |
| 2012 | Doctors | Martin Millar | Series regular |
| 2014 | Constantine | Dr. Roger Huntoon | Episode: "Non Est Asylum" |
| 2015 | The Musketeers | Renard | Episode: "The Return" |
| 2015 | Battle Creek | Phil | Episode: "Syruptitious" |
| 2016 | Baskets | Professor Henri | 2 episodes |
| 2016 | The Bureau | Barry | 1 episode |
| 2018 | Borderline Talent | Igor | 1 episode |
| 2019 | Escape the Night | Merlin the Magician | Episode: "Dark Magic and a Twisted Fate" |
| 2019 | NCIS: Los Angeles | Brian Cooper | Episode: "A Bloody Brilliant Plan" |
| 2021 | It's Always Sunny in Philadelphia | Father Michael | Episode: "The Gang's Still in Ireland" |
| 2022 | The Fairly OddParents: Fairly Odder | Rockin' Joel | 2 Episodes |
| 2023 | Hunters | Fritz | Episode: "Van Glooten's Day 1972 Butter Sculptor of the Year" |
| 2025 | Days of our Lives | Foster | Recurring role |
