= Oliver's Travels =

1995 television series

Oliver's Travels is a five-part television serial written by Alan Plater and starring Alan Bates, Sinéad Cusack, Bill Paterson, and Miles Anderson. It first aired in the UK between 11 June and 9 July 1995.

== Plot ==
Bates plays the titular Oliver (it is never made clear whether this is his first or last name), a keen word-game enthusiast and lecturer in comparative religion. After his teaching post is made redundant, he resolves to make use of his new wealth of free time by going to visit his favourite crossword compiler, 'Aristotle', with whom he has corresponded but whom he has never met. When he arrives, however, he finds Aristotle's house has been ransacked and its occupant has departed for parts unknown, and he sets out to discover why.

Accompanied by WPC Diane Priest (Cusack) (suspended from the police for voicing suspicions about a senior officer), and doggedly pursued by the mysterious Mr. Baxter (Paterson), he finds himself caught up in all manner of nefarious activities, leading from South Wales to a surprising twist ending in the Orkney islands.

== Cast ==
- Alan Bates as Oliver
- Sinéad Cusack as WPC Diane Priest
- Bill Paterson as Baxter
- Morgan Jones as Michael Priest
- Miles Anderson as Baron Kite
- Peter Vaughan as Delaney
- Charlotte Coleman as Cathy

== Production ==
The series was developed from Alan Plater's own novel.

== Reception ==
A Library Journal review of the 2005 DVD release commended the casting of Bates and Cusack, describing them as "both sexy and attractive in middle age" and "believable". Rating the programme as "Highly recommended", it concluded: "This is an enchanting, upbeat, and thoroughly entertaining miniseries, perfect for those library collections whose clientele adore anything British and who appreciate wit, humor, and intelligent protagonists at play."
