= Rob Heyland =

British screenwriter and actor (born 1954)

Rob Heyland (born 2 April 1954) is a British screenwriter, actor and landscape designer.

== Early life and education ==
Heyland was born in London to Irish parents and brought up in Kent where his father was a GP. He was educated at The King’s School, Canterbury and studied acting at the Central School of Speech and Drama in London (1976-9).

== Career ==
=== Acting ===
On leaving Central, Rob and his wife Victoria were involved in the setting up of Burgh House arts and community centre in Hampstead and became the centre's first administrators (1979-1984). At the same time Rob started his acting career as a founder member of The Kick Theatre Company with Deborah Warner.

Heyland and Warner took over the running of the New End Theatre in Hampstead. They opened with Anthony Minghella’s Whale Music. They commissioned Steven Berkoff to write Decadence, with Linda Marlowe, which had its premier at the theatre. They also brought Judi Dench and her husband Michael Williams in their final performance together in Village Wooing. Heyland established a thriving late night review spot at the theatre, which hosted, amongst others, the Edinburgh Fringe award winning Cambridge Footlights team of Stephen Fry, Emma Thompson, Hugh Laurie and Tony Slattery in their first London performances. They also established The Wow Show, a rolling revue involving up-and-coming comedians.

Heyland began his professional acting career playing Policeman in a 1982 episode of The Professionals entitled Cry Wolf His only line of dialogue was: "Grub up Miller". He had two lines in Reilly, Ace of Spies (1983) and then went on to land the lead role of Donald Turner in the prime time BBC TV series One By One – (three series - 1984–1987) (Viewing figures reached 15 million) .

One By One led to him starring in Pepperami adverts, including "Venus Fly Trap" and "Piranha". Latterly, not much liking working in front of the camera, Heyland focused on theatre.

Theatre credits include Henry VIII in A Man For All Seasons at Birmingham Rep, with Denys Hawthorne as Sir Thomas More. A season with The Royal Shakespeare Company playing The Prince in Romeo and Juliet, with Mark Rylance as Romeo, Cloten in Cymbeline and The Priest in Have. Heyland was Baron Tuzenbach in The Three Sisters at the Albery Theater in London’s West End with Francesca Annis, Susan Penhaligon, Ian Ogilvy, Hywel Bennett, and Ron Cook. It was directed by Elijah Moshinsky, with Sam Mendes as assistant. Touring credits include: Trevor Tinsley in Funny Peculiar and Mellors in Lady Chatterley’s Lover.

=== Script Writing ===
Heyland began his writing career in 1991, as part of the team that helped Tony Garnett to create BBC’s hit series Between The Lines (1992-4), starring Neil Pearson. Heyland wrote 7 episodes over 3 seasons (BAFTA, Writers Guild, Broadcasting Press Guild.)

Heyland developed, co-produced and wrote Have Your Cake and Eat It (1997) starring Sinead Cusack (Royal Television Award for Best Actress), James Bolam, Phillip Glenister, Rebecca Front, James Purefoy, and Honeysuckle Weeks.

Other shows created by Heyland include Bomber (ITV film, 2000), with Mark Strong; Promoted to Glory (ITV film. 2003) with Ken Stott, Lesley Manville and Kevin Whately; Ultimate Force (ITV series, 4 seasons – 2002–2007) with Ross Kemp; Whistleblower (RTE, two part film, 2008) with Charlene McKenna and Adrian Dunbar, (Best drama IFTA and Celtic Film Awards, IFTA).

Other TV writing credits include: Wycliffe, Thief Takers, Kavanagh QC, Out of Hours, Heartbeat, The Scarlet Pimpernel, Foyle's War, Robin Hood and Striking Out.

He is currently developing a French Revolution series with Sir Simon Schama.

== Politics ==
Heyland was a founder member of the Social Democratic Party (SDP). He was on the policy committee and stood for election in Belsize ward in the local elections in Camden. He was also a member of the 300 group, pushing for greater representation of women in parliament. He has spoken on platforms against consumerism and how it will destroy the planet. "A finite planet and a system of infinite growth are not compatible".
