= Between the Lines (TV series) =

British police procedural TV series (1992–1994)

- Genre: Crime drama
- Created by: J. C. Wilsher
- Starring: Neil Pearson; Tom Georgeson; Siobhan Redmond; Tony Doyle; Robin Lermitte; Lesley Vickerage; John Shrapnel; Jerome Flynn; David Lyon; Hugh Ross
- Theme music composer: Hal Lindes; Colin Towns
- Country of origin: United Kingdom
- Original language: English
- No. of series: 3
- No. of episodes: 35

Production
- Executive producer: Tony Garnett
- Producers: Peter Norris; Joy Lale
- Running time: 50 minutes
- Production companies: Island World Productions; World Productions

Original release
- Network: BBC1
- Release: 4 September 1992 – 21 December 1994

Between the Lines is a television police drama series created by J. C. Wilsher and produced by World Productions for the BBC. It was first shown on BBC1 between 4 September 1992 and 21 December 1994, running for three series.

== Premise ==
The show centred on the eventful life of Detective Superintendent Tony Clark, played by Neil Pearson. Clark was an ambitious member of the Complaints Investigation Bureau (CIB), an internal organisation of the Metropolitan Police that investigates complaints against officers and claims of corruption within the police force. Along the way Clark had to overcome strong influence from his superiors and problems in his private life, most notably the break-up of his marriage following an affair with WPC Jenny Dean (Lesley Vickerage). Throughout the series, Clark was assisted by colleagues Harry Naylor (Tom Georgeson) and Maureen 'Mo' Connell (Siobhan Redmond).

The show became a surprise hit for the BBC, winning a British Academy Television Award (BAFTA) for Best Drama Series in 1994. In 2000, it was voted into the 100 Greatest British Television Programmes by the British Film Institute. The series was reviewed in an episode of the BBC documentary series Call the Cops, which stated the series had "found a way of getting to grips with the corruption scandals of the 1990s".

Wilsher had already written episodes of The Bill, while Executive producer Tony Garnett had begun his career as an actor before becoming a producer in the late 1960s. His credits included The Wednesday Play and Play for Today. Following Between the Lines, he went on to produce several popular and notable series including This Life (1996–97), Ballykissangel and The Cops (1998–2001).

== Plot ==
Clark's work as a lead officer in CIB was the focus of the first two series. In the first series, his boss was Deakin, a tough ex-RUC Northern Irish policeman. At the end of the first series, Deakin was revealed to be a corrupt officer himself. He left the force but remained a recurring character, working freelance for security services and others, sometimes in conflict with Clark, sometimes assisting him. At the start of the third series (after a dramatic shoot-out at the end of the second), Clark, Naylor and Connell leave the police force and work in the murky world of private security, far-right political groups and espionage.

The third series ends with the betrayal of Clark and Naylor, who had been masquerading as mercenaries. The betrayal is made by Connell in league with Deakin, their former boss and nemesis. It is unclear whether Clark and Naylor have died, as the show ended on a cliffhanger. Rumours of a remake did circulate for some years, but Pearson confirmed in 'Watching the Detectives' that he had wanted a "final" ending at the time and would never return to the role.

Between The Lines was one of the first British TV dramas to include a bisexual character (whose sexual orientation is incidental rather than central to the plot). Maureen (Mo) Connell (Siobhan Redmond) has two significant romantic partners over the course of the series: a serious boyfriend in season 2 and, later, a long-term girlfriend. While some other police officers are briefly shown making disapproving comments (e.g. when she brings her girlfriend as a plus-one to a police social), her bisexuality is shown as completely accepted by close colleagues, if a subject of occasional friendly banter (e.g. Mo mentions having a date that night, Tony asks "girl or boy?" and she replies sarcastically "one of each").

== Background ==
Until the 1970s, complaints against the police in Britain were dealt with internally, with no outside oversight, leading to public dissatisfaction amid allegations that misconduct and corruption were not being effectively dealt with. The 1976 Police Act established the Police Complaints Board, an independent review body, but following the Scarman Report in 1982 this was replaced by the more effective Police Complaints Authority, creating the background of the series. However, even today, under the current Independent Police Complaints Commission (IPCC), the majority of complaints against the police are dealt with internally. The IPCC investigates the most serious cases and deals with appeals. At the time of the series in the 1990s, the department of the Metropolitan Police responsible for internal investigations was the Complaints Investigation Bureau (CIB); it has subsequently been replaced by the Directorate of Professional Standards (DPS).

The first two series of Between the Lines is a dramatisation of the work of the CIB. In the third series, the focus shifts more towards the secret services, with MI5 in particular. John Deakin, whose shadow is present throughout all three series, has a past in the Ulster police. He is the "fireproof" high-ranking detective who decides which other high-ranking detectives may use which methods. Tony manages to discover who he really is, but not good enough. Deakin also has contacts in the secret services. And the final two episodes ("The End User" 1 & 2) deal with a story of illegal weapon smuggling to Northern Ireland. Although set primarily in London, one episode was filmed partly in Bolton, with the Town Hall appearing in several scenes.

Guest stars in the series included many well-known British actors who have gone on to star in other major television dramas and/or movies, including Daniel Craig, James Nesbitt, Jerome Flynn, Bernard Hill, David Morrissey, Jaye Griffiths, Paul Brooke, Francesca Annis, Sylvestra Le Touzel, John Hannah, Michael Kitchen, David Hayman, Hermione Norris, Edward Tudor-Pole, Ray Winstone, Larry Lamb, Hugh Bonneville, Marc Warren, Ben Chaplin and Jonny Lee Miller. Most of them were unknown or less known, prior to their appearances in this series.

== Overview ==
Between the Lines comprised three series broadcast annually between 1992 and 1994. Each focusing on Superintendent Clark, Inspector Naylor, Sergeant Connell and Chief Superintendent Deakin, although the premise changes over time; by the end of the last series, none of them is employed by the Metropolitan Police. The first series is primarily concerned with the overarching question of whether the police can investigate themselves, as well as with Clarke's increasingly complex private life. Many of the plot lines in the first series reflected contemporary UK news items, for instance, the killing of a man with an imitation firearm ('"Out of the Game'), the death of a black man while in police custody ('Nothing Personal'), drugs, sink estates, gun crime or recent miscarriages of justice such as the Birmingham Six and the Guildford Four. The second series broadens from just looking at the police to looking at their relationship with the intelligence services, while the third—the first to feature overseas location filming—looks at the connections between the state and terrorism. The show was part of a tradition in British crime programming of looking not just at a crime, or a series of crimes, for amusement, but of broader themes, often related to current affairs.

== Cast ==
- Neil Pearson as Detective Superintendent Tony Clark
- Tom Georgeson as Detective Inspector Harry Naylor
- Siobhan Redmond as Detective Sergeant Maureen "Mo" Connell
- Tony Doyle as Chief Superintendent John Deakin
- Robin Lermitte as Detective Superintendent David Graves
- David Lyon as Commander Brian Huxtable
- Lesley Vickerage as WPC Jenny Dean
- Hugh Ross as Commander Graham Sullivan
- John Shrapnel as Deputy Assistant Commissioner Dunning
- Jerome Flynn as Detective Sergeant Eddie Hargreaves

== Episodes ==
The show is a hybrid of individual stories and an overarching plot, with character development. The first episode, "Private Enterprise", set the scene for the rest of the first series, exploring the theme of the relationship between police and their informants, with the non-CBI officers being "clearly represented within the British macho culture of The Sweeney". It introduces a raft of female characters, both in the police and outside, including Clarke's wife, whom he effectively recruits as his assistant on the case; he subsequently does the same with his lover. In the early episodes, Clark's training in CID is still a strong influence, and he often attempts to solve the crime for which CIB has been called in. Both Naylor and Connell remind him that that is no longer his job, as does Deakin—with the first episode's last line—"you're not CID anymore, you're CIB".

The cinematography often used close-ups and low-key lighting effects, which combined with a fast edit, creates an impression for the viewer of "grubby realism", allowing the show to therefore "stake out a new generic terrain for itself, in which the ethics of police practices move into higher relief than the pursuit of villains," argues Brunsdon.

=== Series 1 (1992) ===
No. overall	No. in series	Title	Directed by	Written by	Original release date	Viewers (millions)
1	1	"Private Enterprise"	Charles McDougall	J. C. Wilsher	4 September 1992	N/A
Ambitious Chief Inspector Tony Clark is head of CID at Mulberry Street police station and has applied for a transfer to the Flying Squad as a Superintendent. After a low-level drug dealer exposes corruption, Clark's office is "locked down", and he discovers that his transfer has been approved – but it's to the Complaints Investigation Bureau – which is not what he wanted.
2	2	"Out of the Game"	Alan Dossor	Russell Lewis	11 September 1992	N/A
Armed police have shot and killed an apparently armed youth, and Clark is running the investigation. The press make the most of the event to stir up unrest, the investigation is being hindered, and tensions rise, not least between Clark and his new boss, John Deakin.
3	3	"Words of Advice"	Alan Dossor	Steve Trafford	18 September 1992	N/A
A white WPC is alleging sexual assault by a black sergeant, however it appears that there is a hidden agenda. Meanwhile, Clark is in difficulty with his first disciplinary case as his main witness is missing.
4	4	"Lies and Damned Lies"	Roy Battersby	Michael Russell	25 September 1992	N/A
The investigation into an assault of a prostitute by CID officers has reached a dead end, Clark's personal life is getting more complicated and pressure from Deakin is not helping. The assault case seems to be cracked from an unusual quarter, but with the only eyewitness dead, it seems there's only one way out.
5	5	"A Watch and Chain of Course"	Roy Battersby	J. C. Wilsher	2 October 1992	N/A
Mike Carswell wins his appeal against conviction for murder, but did corrupt officers conspire to convict him? Meanwhile, Mo is undercover investigating missing property and Dunning is looking to move upwards, out of the Met. A major witness in the Carswell investigation, however, turns out to be too close to Clark for comfort.
6	6	"Lest Ye Be Judged"	Charles McDougall	Rob Heyland	9 October 1992	N/A
Clark and his team visit Liverpool to investigate an armed robbery conviction. A confession may have been beaten out of the robber, and a local reporter has an axe to grind.
7	7	"Breaking Point"	Charles McDougall	Rob Heyland	16 October 1992	N/A
Tensions rise on a picket line, leaving Clark to discover who is responsible for serious injuries. Hard evidence is in short supply and old loyalties muddy the waters. Meanwhile, Clark's personal life is heading rapidly downhill.
8	8	"The Only Good Copper"	Tom Clegg	Russell Lewis	23 October 1992	N/A
A youth stabs Constable Norton to death, and Clark's leave is cancelled to investigate an outstanding complaint against the officer. Was Norton the saint he is portrayed as or can Clark uncover a different picture?
9	9	"Watching the Detectives"	Tom Clegg	Steve Trafford	30 October 1992	N/A
Clark and his team investigate an officer who is caught apparently accepting a bribe but must discover whether he's been set up. Meanwhile, officers involved in the Carswell case, including Jenny Dean, are feeling under pressure. Clark has a suspect in the corruption case but politics intervene.
10	10	"Nothing to Declare"	Jenny Killick	Michael Russell	6 November 1992	N/A
When Customs and Excise stages an observation on suspected drugs dealers on the Thames, one of their number, Fisher, goes missing. Huxtable asks Clark to investigate. Relations between all the different parties involved complicate the enquiry. Customs and Excise are convinced Thames Division is collaborating with the drugs squad to sabotage their operation.
11	11	"Nothing Personal"	Jenny Killick	Rob Heyland	13 November 1992	N/A
Joey Pearce, a young man, is found hanging in his cell at St. Helen's nick. The arresting officer, DI Gordon, is called to help revive the boy, but he is dead. Clark is called out and starts investigating; one by one Clark interviews everyone in the custody suite. Pearce had been arrested with another man, Dilly, a known dealer, in possession of dealer quantities of crack.
12	12	"Nobody's Fireproof"	Alan Dossor	J. C. Wilsher	27 November 1992	N/A
Supt. Urquhart is arrested behind King's Cross station with a prostitute in his car. Commander Huxtable is pleased; rumours about Urquhart's relationship with porn king Denis Ralston go back years. Urquhart's home is raided, and it is clear to Clark that he is running his life on more than a Super's salary.
13	13	"The Chill Factor"	Alan Dossor	J. C. Wilsher	4 December 1992	N/A
Deputy Chief Constable Dunning has been suspended, following allegations made by the Urquharts. At Jenny Dean's funeral, Clark is rebuffed by her father. Deakin tells Huxtable that he has been sent home on leave pending the Dunning investigation and that he should take some time off himself.

=== Series 2 (1993) ===
No. overall	No. in series	Title	Directed by	Written by	Original release date	Viewers (millions)
14	1	"New Order"	Alan Dossor	J. C. Wilsher	5 October 1993	N/A
Clark is called to investigate the failure of a uniformed constable to arrest a violent racist; it transpires that this is a Special Branch undercover officer, but it isn't clear whether he still has the interests of the law as a priority. Meanwhile, Deakin is on trial and Clark's rival, Graves, is up for promotion. The visit of an American revisionist historian, Deakin's acquittal and Graves's promotion all cause headaches for Clark.
15	2	"Manslaughter"	Alan Dossor	Rob Heyland	12 October 1993	N/A
Det. Supt. Lindsay has confessed to killing his wife, claiming he did so as a crime of passion; however, Clark is sceptical. His suspicions are aroused because of similarities to a case Lindsay investigated five years ago, and as time is running out, he is under pressure to get the right result. It is discovered that Lindsay had been having an affair with his sister-in-law, and the post-mortem uncovers crucial evidence.
16	3	"Crack Up"	Robert Bierman	Ray Brennan	19 October 1993	N/A
An armed response team is called to the robbery of an off-licence, and one of the robbers is shot dead. Clark, called in to investigate, is given a cassette tape, which indicates that the police have given the robber a gun in exchange for drugs. However, the tape is incomplete and Clark's team must track down the original - but, when it is found, the truth is revealed.
17	4	"Honourable Men"	Robert Bierman	Russell Lewis	26 October 1993	N/A
A government minister with an axe to grind against the Met is caught in flagrante delicto with his secretary; it is suspected that his movements have been leaked to the press by one of his protection officers, and CIB launch an investigation, if only to clear themselves. Clark is given the case, but it turns out that it may be more political in-fighting than police corruption.
18	5	"Some Must Watch..."	Roy Battersby	Rob Heyland	2 November 1993	N/A
Special Branch, watching a T.A. centre, witness a potential raid on its weapons store; armed officers shoot a 68-year-old workman by mistake. The intruders claim to be working for MI5 and refuse to assist Clark's investigation. It transpires that MI5 was bugging the centre to entrap an N.C.O. and a Special Branch Inspector suspected of selling arms to terrorists. After a number of machinations, the official position turns out to be a whitewash, and Clark learns that the security services' tentacles reach into his activities.
19	6	"Manoeuvre 11"	Roy Battersby	Ron Rose	9 November 1993	N/A
Mounted police go in to break up a riot following a demo against public spending cuts; a young girl is injured and later dies. Clark must find out who authorised the police action, and discovers that Chief Superintendent Tattersall, although accepting responsibility, may be covering up for failures in the chain of command.
20	7	"The Fifth Estate"	Peter Smith	Rob Heyland	16 November 1993	N/A
Bosher, an investigative journalist, prints details of a "royal conversation" allegedly from a tape leaked from GCHQ; when the tape is reported missing, Clark investigates whether Special Branch stole it. Angela Berridge, however, says that the tape has never existed, and this is confirmed by her contact at GCHQ. Mo discovers that MI5 have a plant in the newspaper office and persuades him to dig into Bosher's files; it is found that Bosher has fabricated the story and claimed £20,000 to pay for the non-existent tape, which enables Mo to persuade him to print material to discredit the local Chief Constable and assist ACC Jan Lewis' search for social and sexual justice.
21	8	"The Great Detective"	Peter Smith	Nicholas Martin	23 November 1993	N/A
To his surprise, an armed robber is convicted, and confesses to other robberies, for one of which Peter Hoskins has already been sentenced to eighteen years. This raises doubts about the methods of Detective Chief Superintendent Trevor Dunn; Hoskins has made a complaint, which lands on Clark's desk. Commander Sparrow pressurises Clark to achieve a quick result, while Hoskins claims to have a videotape of Dunn accepting a bribe. The tape has supposedly been left in a railway station locker and Clark must find it. The tape is found, but Clark finds Naylor trying to remove it to protect Dunn, and it seems that the locker key was not in Hoskins's possession. Meanwhile, it turns out that Sparrow has recently visited Hoskins in prison.
22	9	"Jumping the Lights"	Robert Bierman	Julian Jones	30 November 1993	N/A
Following a vice squad celebration, P.C. Curles knocks over a young boy; chased by Supt. Cullen, a traffic officer, he evades him, changes back into his uniform and returns to the scene, pretending to assist. The car he was driving turns out to be unregistered and, finding only a blank police memo pad in it, Maureen has little to go on. The boy's parents complain and Clark is called in to investigate. The hit-and-run victim dies, and Clark discovers an ongoing feud between traffic police and the vice squad; evidence of the accident initially points to the wrong officer, but eventually Curles is interviewed. However, since he assisted at the scene, his fingerprints are all over the car.
23	10	"What's the Strength of This?"	Robert Bierman	J. C. Wilsher	7 December 1993	N/A
Uniformed officers called to a sudden death are accused of stealing property; a local burglar eventually confesses to the crime, but Clark is not sure that he hasn't been coached into an admission. Naylor's boss is seen reporting to Deakin, and Naylor is given extra wages as a "bonus"- or bribe. The following day, Graves suspends Naylor and initiates disciplinary proceedings. Clark traces events back to Deakin and confronts him about the inoperative alarm and burglary of a solicitor's office, which Mo finds has not been reported. After leverage has been applied in the right places, Naylor's job is safe. However, there is a deniable link between Angela Berridge and Deakin.
24	11	"Big Boys' Rules (Part One)"	Richard Standeven	J. C. Wilsher	14 December 1993	N/A
Declan Harris is found murdered in Epping Forest, with evidence claiming he's been forced into being a Special Branch informer. Clark is tasked with investigating the suspicion that the Branch also killed him. Meanwhile, Naylor has been transferred and takes up an existing murder investigation; his boss, however, is all too keen to get it wrapped up without delay. It transpires that Harris had recently contacted Inspector Dilke, who has him down as a fantasist. Deakin is seen talking to Trevor Bull, an extremely violent armed robber, and Clark is under pressure to get a quick- and convenient- result. Harry's principal suspect in the murder is Simon Bridge, the victim's nephew.
25	12	"Big Boys' Rules (Part Two)"	Richard Standeven	J. C. Wilsher	21 December 1993	N/A
Clark, Naylor and Dilke attend Harris's funeral, as does Trevor Bull. The official report has exonerated Special Branch of Harris' death and Clark is told to back-pedal on Deakin. It turns out that Deakin has funded works at Bull's house, and Clark puts this to Bull, seeking the dirt on Deakin, to no avail. Instead of going to Mo's promotion party, (Note: Parties—both in the office and externally—are often used to showcase the camaraderie of the job.) Clark goes round to a safe house to see Angela Berridge, only to find Deakin there. He is told that Deakin has been freelancing for MI5 and if he goes down, so will Angela. Bull, meanwhile, has dug up a pump-action shotgun and has shot a police officer who came to investigate. Ignorant of Bull's actions, Deakin blackmails Clark into "fixing" him, but after Clark has left, Deakin realises Clarke will need assistance.

=== Series 3 (1994) ===
No. overall	No. in series	Title	Directed by	Written by	Original release date	Viewers (millions)
26	1	"Foxtrot Oscar"	Alan Dossor	Rob Heyland	19 October 1994	N/A
Having sacrificed his career in the Met, Clark ponders what to do next, until Deakin pays him a visit - and asks him to travel to Tunisia to help a tabloid newspaper substantiate a story about an MP's private life.
27	2	"A Safe Pair of Hands"	Alan Dossor	Steve Griffiths	26 October 1994	N/A
Naylor struggles to regain his composure following the death of his wife. Meanwhile, Connell's career in the Met hangs in the balance, and Clark accepts his first investigation after delving into the world of espionage.
28	3	"A Face in the Crowd"	Richard Standeven	Julian Jones	2 November 1994	N/A
Deakin asks Naylor and Clark to track down a missing person.
29	4	"Shoot to Kill"	Richard Standeven	J.C. Wilsher	9 November 1994	N/A
Connell calls upon Clark and Naylor for help after falling into difficulty with a client.
30	5	"Close Protection"	Ian Knox	Nicholas Martin	16 November 1994	N/A
Clark takes on the task of providing protection for a Chilean general, who has been receiving death threats.
31	6	"Blooded"	Ian Knox	J. C. Wilsher	23 November 1994	N/A
Connell goes undercover to find out who is setting fire to a chain of fur shops, while Clark fears for Naylor's safety after he accepts a job working for a dodgy pharmaceutical company.
32	7	"Unknown Soldier"	Ross Devenish	Julian Jones	30 November 1994	N/A
Clark investigates when a computer engineer from the defence industry is found dead in his garage, and ignores Deakin's warning to steer clear of the investigation.
33	8	"Free Trade"	Ross Devenish	Gordon Hann	7 December 1994	N/A
Clark and Naylor set up a profitable arms job, but Connell wants in on the action - but the pair are convinced that it's too dangerous.
34	9	"The End User (Part One)"	Roy Battersby	Dusty Hughes	14 December 1994	N/A
Clark is asked by Deakin to go undercover as a gun runner for a major neo-fascist rally in Belgium, posing as a right-wing arms dealer.
35	10	"The End User (Part Two)"	Roy Battersby	Dusty Hughes	21 December 1994	N/A
Clark and Naylor are blamed for failing to stop an arms shipment heading for Northern Ireland, but realise that they have been double-crossed when Connell reveals she is still working for the police - and has offered up her two former colleagues for a promotion. Trapped on a boat that is about to explode, will Clark and Naylor make it out alive?

== Themes ==
=== Equal opportunities ===
Noted for its approach to sexuality and gender, Between the Lines was one of several programmes that directly addressed equal opportunities for women in the police. It also addressed equal opportunities as portrayed in the media, notes Brunsdon, particularly the contrasting attitudes within the force to those presented to the media.

Thus the initial response by a senior officer of the investigating team in Between the Lines to a sexual harassment case brought by a white female officer against a black male officer is: "Since the commissioner's been parading his equal opportunities policy all over the Met., I'd appreciate a fairly sensitive handling of the case"

— Commander Huxtable in 'Words of Advice', 18 September 1992, in

Conversely, this attitude is not reflected among ordinary police "in the pub, but even there, change is recognised". Later in the episode, Naylor is vehemently critical of the station commander's original handling of the case, arguing that he should have "promised her everything [and done] her legs later", to which Deakin reminds him "those days are gone, Harry".

=== "Canteen culture" ===
The program highlights the role of a "canteen culture" within the police, an organisation—notwithstanding the 1974 Equal Opportunities Act—still at the time of broadcast dominated by men, and Between the Lines draws a link between masculinity and corruption, with the former underpinning the latter. Masonic dinners and heavy drinking sessions are common. The theme of not "grassing" on colleagues runs through the first two series, for example, in episode four ("Lies and Damned Lies"). Here, a sergeant helps cover up the errors of a senior officer—who is also Master of their Masonic Lodge—and eventually reveals this to CIB. In response, he is ostracised, the Masonic oath is used to threaten him, and he commits suicide as a result. To some extent Clarke epitomises this culture: "He attracts, and is attracted to, women. He drinks, swears, loses his temper and has no time for the refined courtesies of polite exchange ... Personally flawed, with a chaotic private life, Clarke is presented as a likeable rogue."

=== Policing and criminality ===
The program is self-conscious, argues media studies professor Charlotte Brunsdon, of its position within the classic police procedural genre, being based as it is in the fictional Complaints Investigation Bureau, investigating "bent coppers". Whereas most such shows have an exclusive cast of the police force generally, that of BTL is even more exclusive, comprising a subset of three.

The programme's fundamental premise, argues Brunsdon, is the question of 'who can police'. It is a question, he suggests, that it approaches with ambiguity. Between the Lines asks whether policing can be effective without a blurring of the boundaries between policing and criminality. Leishman and Mason argue that

Although one might consider a series dealing with police corruption to be inherently critical of the police, the series simply drew a line, albeit a

blurred one, between the transgressor of police rules and the heroic cop

personified in Clark. The rotten cop in the barrel was not always entirely rotten. The murky areas of policing and the portrayal of the police as under stress and doing a difficult job led to a blurring between good and evil, ‘between the lines’ of the title.

Deakin, for example, notes at the end of the first series that "the Met has never been cleaner. I can tell you that for a fact. It's also a fact that our clean-up rate is at an all-time low. What conclusion you draw ... is entirely up to you."

=== Loyalty ===
Clark says in the first episode, "my cover's fireproof at Mulbery Street. No one's going to think I'm a grass in my own nick."

=== "Who guards the guards?" ===
Brings up to date, in the context of a late 1980s-1990s understanding of policing methods, the dictum, quis custodiet ipsos custodes? ('Who will guard the guards'?). (Note: Executive producer Tony Garnett suggested that this reflected a debate that was taking place within the police service at the time: There is a very intelligent debate going on at senior levels in the country questioning this very matter [who should police the police]... There are a number of extremely intelligent officers who are very concerned about the relationship between the police and the public. In some ways, there is a more intelligent discussion going on inside the police than outside.)

== Reception ==
The first series averaged 6-8 million viewers per week. Between the Lines was described by academic Annette Hill as the "finally paranoid" police drama of the 1990s. Chris Dunkley, writing in the Financial Times—and had praised the first series' originality—wrote of his disppointment by the third, saying 'how quickliy things change", while White commented that it went from "the classiest, sharpest, most convincing police drama ever produced in this country into a conspiracy-thon". Brunsdon argues that it was because the series ceased to possess a tight focus—for instance, on police corruption—and loosened its plotlines that it became a "rootless narrative".

== Broadcast ==
In Ontario, Canada, the program was retitled Inside the Line because the broadcaster TVOntario already had a current affairs program called Between the Lines and did not want them confused.

== DVD release ==
The complete series of Between The Lines has been released on DVD (Region 2) by 2 Entertain/Cinema Club with music edits.
