= Lloyd George Knew My Father =

Lloyd George Knew My Father (or My Father Knew Lloyd George) may refer to:

- "Lloyd George Knew My Father" (song), an English schoolboy song
- Lloyd George Knew My Father (play), a 1972 play by William Douglas-Home
- My Father Knew Lloyd George (TV programme), a 1965 British one-off television show

== See also ==
- Lloyd George
- "Onward, Christian Soldiers", the name of the tune for the schoolboy song
