= Short-term mission =

Mobilization of a Christian missionary for a short period of time

A short-term mission (STM) is the mobilization of a Christian missionary for a short period of time ranging from days to a year; many short-term missions are called mission trips. The short-term missionary is a fairly recent innovation in the global missions movement, but many short-term missions agencies are seeing an increased number of trips that consist of a week up to a year.

== Overview ==
Short-term missions started in the 1960s. A few organizations, like YWAM (Youth with a Mission) and OM (Operation Mobilisation) created trips lasting from a month to a year. Short-term missions was known as a way for young people to grow their faith and self, while also aiding those in need. Many individual churches joined in on the movement.

During the 1970s, high school students began to take part. It grew during the 1980s and was extremely popular in the 1990s. Short-term missions have had different meanings based on the people taking part. Some make it about looking for possible long-term missionaries and helping those who are already involved, where others focus on the spiritual path and growth while helping others. The idea that they are about serving others and growing in faith became the more popular reason to go on a mission trip. More than 2 million Americans participate in these trips yearly. These trips act as a way for numerous people to help the less fortunate. While they are a way to grow spiritually, these trips also act as community service projects.

Generally, missionaries have been people sent to spread their religious faith, usually among the people of another country or region in which that faith is not widely practiced. In the past 50 years, churches have moved toward mobilizing young people for short-term trips.

There are independent STMs organizations as well as denominations and individual churches that facilitate these trips all over the world. Many individuals going on short-term mission trips raise partial or full support from family and friends to help pay for their trip. Costs include not only travel, food and lodging but often associated project expenses as well. In recent years, a number of services have been established to help individuals raise support for their short-term mission trips using online email and social media tools.

== Statistics ==
- $45 billion has been given to mission trips
- 400,000 foreign missionaries
- 5.5 million full-time Christian workers
- Only 10% of international students are reached by ministries when in the US
- 2.2 billion Christians world-wide

== Criticisms ==
There has been attention paid to the shift in the form of modern short-term missionary work, which takes shape in the conflation of spiritualism with contemporary military metaphors and practices. Missionary work as spiritual warfare is the latest iteration in a long-standing relationship between Christian missions and militarization. Spiritual warriors are aggressive prayer intercessors who can pray openly in public spaces with a goal of imposing change onto another party or group. The fact that the intensification of militarization in recent years has extended to the missionary practices of some charismatic Christians does not mean that all missions, short-term or otherwise, need be implicated. But contemporary military metaphors and practices as a generative force animating the sphere of Christian spiritualism are becoming more and more notable as social militarization of everyday life increases; religion studies scholar Elizabeth A. McAlister argues they should be questioned in the context of efforts to spread a particular religious faith.

== See also ==
- 10/40 window
