= Miles Christi (disambiguation) =

Miles Christi or Milites Christi (Latin for Soldier of Christ) may refer to:

- Soldiers of the Crusades
- Miles Christi (Religious Order), a multinational Catholic religious order founded in Argentina in 1994
- Miles Christianus ideal/allegory
- Members of the Iona Community
- Knights of the Order of Dobrzyń

== See also ==
- Christian soldier (disambiguation)
