= Onward, Christian Pilgrims =

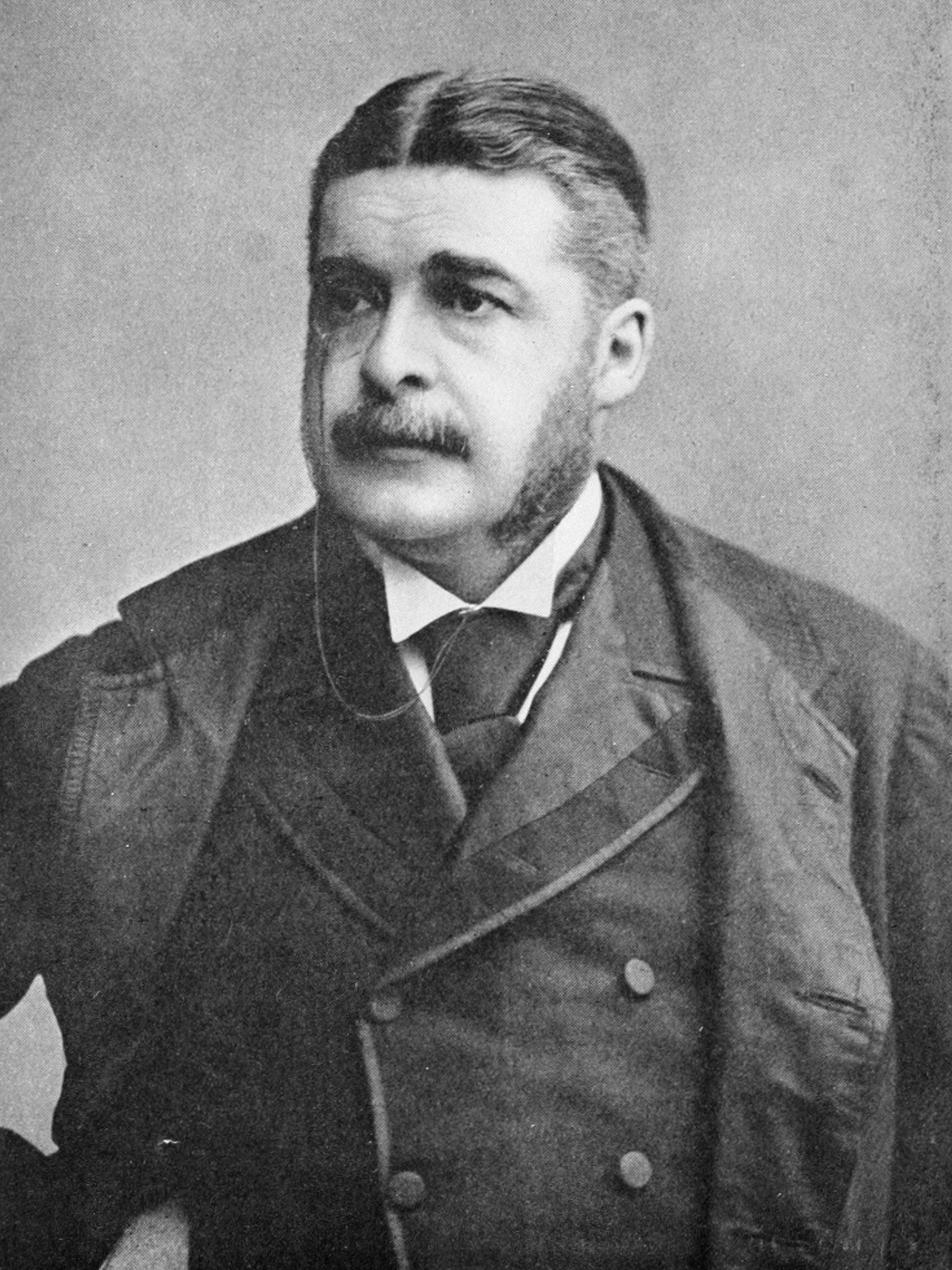
- Sir Arthur Sullivan
- Genre: Hymn
- Text: David Wright
- Meter: 6.5.6.5 D with refrain
- Melody: "St. Gertrude" by Arthur Sullivan

"Onward, Christian Pilgrims" is a 20th-century Christian hymn by David Wright. It was composed in 1982, is based on "Onward, Christian Soldiers", and was intended as a non-militaristic version of the earlier hymn.

== History ==
"Onward, Christian Soldiers" was written in 1865 and uses New Testament military metaphors of Christians as soldiers. In the 1980s there was a growing movement against the notion of Christian military references, leading to some churches in the United States dropping it from their hymn books. In the United Kingdom, after the Falklands War, David Wright attempted to revive "Onward, Christian Soldiers" as a pacifist hymn while keeping its tune by writing "Onward, Christian Pilgrims" to the same tune. Richard Ingrams informed the wider British public about the hymn. The hymn was later included in Anglican hymn books from 1996. It also replaced "Onward, Christian Soldiers" in British crematorium hymn books because of concerns over "military imagery". The hymn was popular with some members of the Church of England's clergy, with some clergy refusing to sing "Onward, Christian Soldiers" in favour of "Onward, Christian Pilgrims".

== Lyrics ==
Comparing the lyrics of "Onward, Christian Pilgrims" and "Onward, Christian Soldiers", the choruses differ in emphasis, as follows:

Comparing the two hymns
"Onward, Christian Pilgrims"

Onward, Christian Pilgrims,
Christ will be our light,
See the heav'nly vision,
Breaks upon our sight.

"Onward, Christian Soldiers"

Onward, Christian Soldiers,
Marching as to war,
With the Cross of Jesus,
Going on before.

== Criticism ==
"Onward, Christian Pilgrims" has been criticized as having been born out of a perceived need to change older hymns to be modernised or more politically correct. "Onward, Christian Pilgrims" is viewed as a politically correct version of "Onward, Christian Soldiers". It was suggested in The Daily Telegraph newspaper that the new hymn was created because of a misreading of "Onward, Christian Soldiers" as being just a commemoration of militaristic Christianity. Some members of the Church of England also objected to "Onward, Christian Pilgrims", which led to new hymn books being issued to certain parishes with "Onward, Christian Soldiers" replacing the new hymn in them.
