= Christian soldier =

The phrase Christian soldier may refer to:

- Miles Christianus, a Christian allegory based on New Testament military metaphors.
- Christians in the military
- Military order (society), one of a variety of Christian societies of knights.
- Church militant and church triumphant

== Songs ==
- "Onward, Christian Soldiers"
- "Soldiers of Christ, Arise"
- "John Brown's Body" – contains the lyric "He’s gone to be a soldier in the army of the Lord!"

== See also ==
- Miles Christi (disambiguation)
- Holy war § Christianity
- New Testament military metaphors
