= Militarization =

Process by which a society organizes itself for military conflict and violence

Militarization, or militarisation, is the process by which a society organizes itself for military conflict and violence. It is related to militarism, which is an ideology that reflects the level of militarization of a state. The process of militarization involves many interrelated aspects that encompass all levels of society.

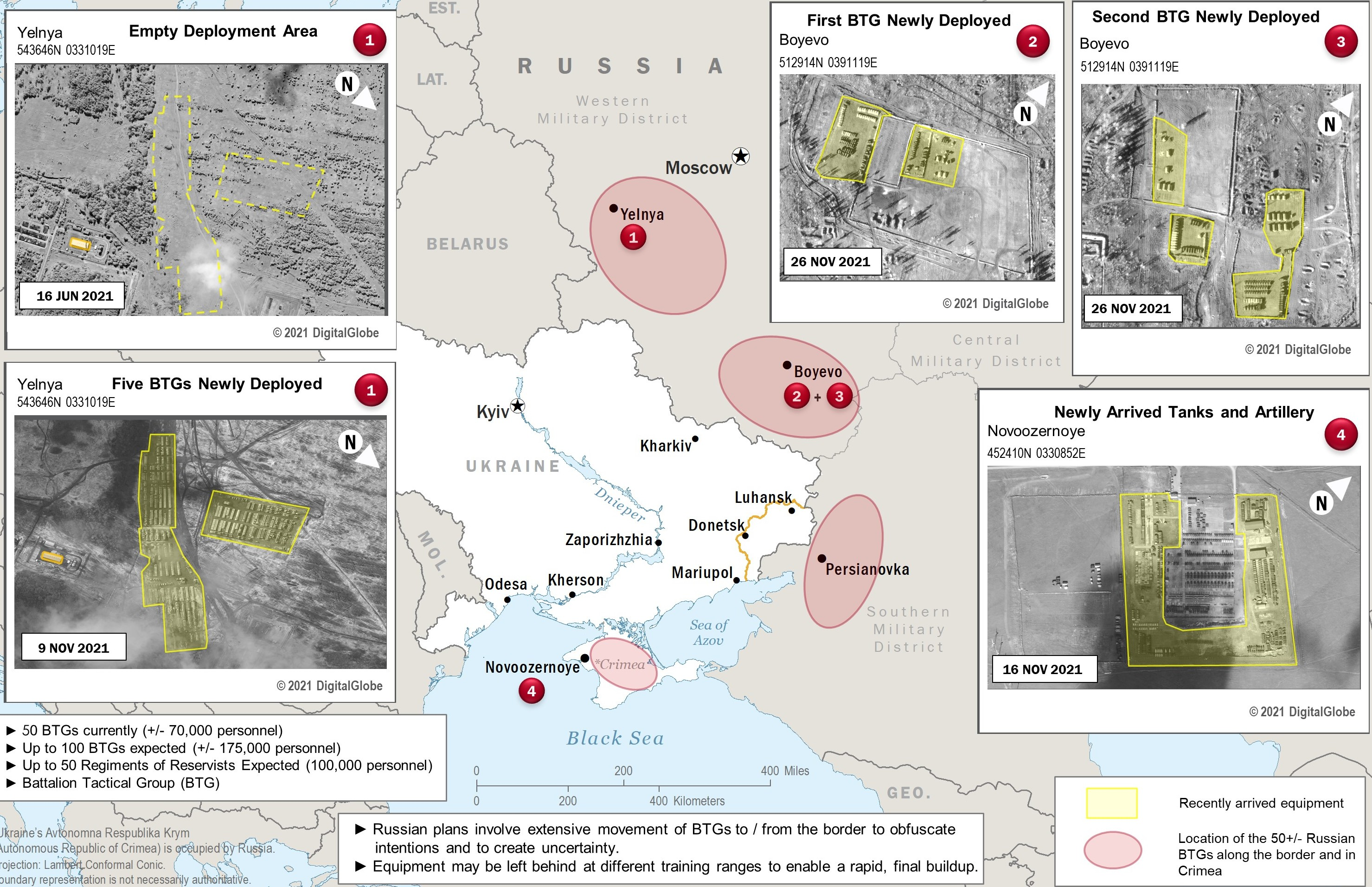
Russian military build-up around Ukraine prior to the 2022 Russian invasion of Ukraine

== Geopolitical ==
The perceived level of threat influences what potential for violence or warfare the state must achieve to assure itself an acceptable level of security. When the perceived level of threat is low, as with Canada, a country may have a relatively small military and a low level of armament. However, in Israel, the supposed threat of attack from neighbouring countries means that the armed forces and defense have a high profile and are given significant funding and personnel.

This threat may involve the:

- Balance of power of neighboring states
- Terrorism, rogue states, weapons of mass destruction and state terrorism
- Threats to state interests, such as political control of a resource-rich region, or preventing the spread of a conflicting ideology (e.g., United States involvement in regime change in Latin America)

== Political ==
Militaristic ideas are referred to within civilian contexts. The War on Poverty declared by President Lyndon B. Johnson, and the war on drugs declared by President Richard Nixon, are rhetorical wars. They are not declared against a concrete, military enemy which can be defeated, but are symbolic of the amount of effort, sacrifice, and dedication which needs to be applied to the issue. They may also be a means of consolidating executive power. As well, politicians have invoked militaristic ideas with rhetorical wars on other social issues. Some governments draw on militaristic imagery when they appoint "task forces" of bureaucrats to address pressing political or social issues.

== Economic ==
- military–industrial complex
- metropolitan–military complex

Militarization has been used as a strategy for boosting a state's economy, by creating jobs and increasing industrial production.

== Social ==
Increasingly, Christian evangelical prayer has taken on militaristic forms and language. Spiritual warfare may involve forms of prayer spoken in militarized discourse. Its adherents, sometimes referring to themselves as "prayer warriors", wage "spiritual battle" on a "prayer battlefield". Spiritual warfare is the latest iteration in a long-standing partnership between religious organizations and militarization, two spheres that religion scholar Elizabeth A. McAlister argues are rarely considered together, although aggressive forms of prayer have long been used to further the aims of expanding Christian influence through a variety of conversion tactics. These tactics have begun being articulated in militaristic imagery, using terms such as "enlist, rally, advance and blitz". Major moments of increased political militarization have occurred concurrently with the growth of prominence of militaristic imagery in many evangelical communities, such as the evangelical engagement in a militarized project of aggressive missionary expansion conducted against the backdrop of the Vietnam War in the 1970s.

=== Gender ===
The military also has a role in defining gender identities. War movies (i.e. Rambo) associate the cultural identities of masculinity with warriors. Representations of Vietnam in popular culture display the male body as a weapon of war and contribute to ideals of masculinity in American culture. Military prowess has been crucial to understandings of contemporary masculinity in European and American culture. During World War I, soldiers who experienced shell-shock were seen as failures of masculinity, unable to withstand war as the ultimate task of manliness. The maintenance of military systems relies on ideas about men and manliness as well as ideas about women and femininity, including notions of fallen women and patriotic motherhood.

Women have been mobilized during times of war to perform tasks seen as incompatible with men's roles in combat, including cooking, laundry, and nursing. Women have also been seen as necessary for servicing male soldiers' sexual needs through prostitution. For example, during the Vietnam War, Vietnamese women who worked as prostitutes were allowed on US bases as local national Jabaits.

=== Civil–military relations ===
The role and image of the military within a society is another aspect of militarization. At differing times and places in history, soldiers have been viewed as respectable, honoured individuals (for example, this was the reputation of Allied soldiers who liberated the Nazi-occupied Netherlands in WWII, or the view of Americans and Canadians who placed support our troops car-magnets on their vehicles during the war on terror). Military figures can become heroes (for example, the Finnish people's view of the Finnish sniper nicknamed "White Death", who killed many Russian invaders). Alternatively, some soldiers can be labeled as "baby killers" (as a few U.S. anti-war activists did during and after the Vietnam War), or as war criminals (such as the Nazi leaders and SS units responsible for the Holocaust).

Furthermore, the military can interfere with politics under democratic regimes. Between 2018 and 2020 in Brazil, the proportion of retired military personnel occupying significant positions in the national government rose to 6.5% of all first-ranked appointed officials, representing a threefold increase compared to the prior administration.

Structural organization is another process of militarization. Before World War II (1939–1945), the United States experienced a post-war reduction of forces after major conflicts, reflecting American suspicion of large standing armies. After World War II, not only was the army maintained, but the National Security Act of 1947 restructured both civilian and military leadership structures, establishing the Department of Defense and the National Security Council. The Act also created permanent intelligence structures (the CIA et al.) within the United States government for the first time, reflecting the civilian government's perception of a need for previously military-based intelligence to be incorporated into the structure of the civilian state.

Ex-soldiers entering business or politics may import military mindsets and jargon into their new environments – thus there is the popularity of advertising campaigns, sales break-throughs and election victories (even if Pyrrhic ones).

== Race ==
Racial interactions between society and the military:

- During imperial Germany, military service was a requirement of citizenship, but Jews and other foreigners were not allowed to serve in the military.
- During Nazi Germany's Holocaust, SS units committed war crimes and crimes against humanity on a massive scale, including executing millions of civilians.
- In the United States, beyond the Civil War, military service was a way for blacks to serve the country, and later appeal for equal citizenship during World War II. The military was one of the first national institutions to be integrated. In 1948, President Harry S. Truman issued Executive Order 9981 establishing equality within the armed services. The military was also a tool of integration. In 1957, President Dwight Eisenhower sent troops to Little Rock, Arkansas, to desegregate a school after the 1954 Brown v. Board of Education Supreme Court decision. (See also MacGregor, 1985.)
- Improved race relations was seen as a national security issue during the Cold War. Communist propaganda cited American racism as a major flaw, and the United States wanted to improve its image to third-world countries which might be susceptible to Communism.

Eleanor Roosevelt said "civil rights [is] an international question. . . [that] may decide whether Democracy or Communism wins out in the world." and this sort of false dichotomy was continued further throughout the McCarthy era and the Cold War in general.

== Police ==
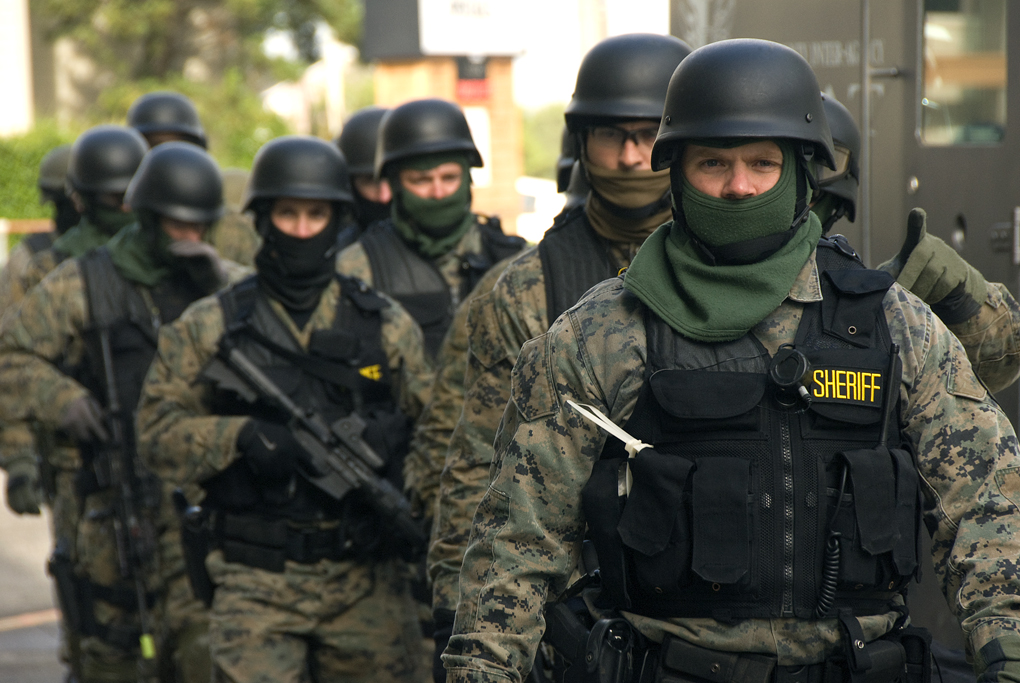
Police SWAT team members, some armed with assault rifles, prepare for an exercise.

The militarization of police involves the use of military equipment and tactics by law enforcement officers. This includes the use of armored personnel carriers, assault rifles, submachine guns, flashbang grenades, grenade launchers, sniper rifles, Special Weapons and Tactics (SWAT) teams. The militarization of law enforcement is also associated with intelligence agency-style information gathering aimed at the public and political activists, and a more aggressive style of law enforcement. Criminal justice professor Peter Kraska has defined militarization of law enforcement as "the process whereby civilian police increasingly draw from, and pattern themselves around, the tenets of militarism and the military model."

Observers have noted the militarizing of the policing of protests. Since the 1970s, riot police have fired at protesters using guns with rubber bullets or plastic bullets. Tear gas, which was developed for riot control in 1919, is widely used against protesters in the 2000s. The use of tear gas in warfare is prohibited by various international treaties that most states have signed; however, its law enforcement or military use for domestic or non-combat situations is permitted.

Concerns about the militarization of police have been raised by both ends of the political spectrum in the United States, with both the right-of-center/libertarian Cato Institute and the left-of-center American Civil Liberties Union voicing criticisms of the practice. The Fraternal Order of Police has spoken out in favor of equipping law enforcement officers with military equipment, on the grounds that it increases the officers' safety and enables them to protect civilians.

== See also ==
- Militarization of space
- List of military officers who have led divisions of a civil service
