= My Father Knew Lloyd George (TV programme) =

Television film

My Father Knew Lloyd George was a one-off BBC satire written by John Bird with additional material by the cast, and directed by Jack Gold. It aired in December 1965.

The programme was set in Victorian England and concerned the antics of a young aristocrat (John Fortune), attempting to distance his grandfather from a scandal concerning the wife of the prime minister. Bird himself played Queen Victoria whilst Alan Bennett played the villain of the piece, and Eleanor Bron also appeared. The show was responsible for seeing Bird named TV Personality of the Year by the Society of Film and Television.

The title comes from the lyrics of a schoolboy song: "Lloyd George Knew My Father, My Father Knew Lloyd George" (sung to the tune of "Onward Christian Soldiers").
