= 30 Is a Dangerous Age, Cynthia =

1968 British film by Joseph McGrath

- Directed by: Joseph McGrath
- Written by: Dudley Moore; Joseph McGrath; John Wells
- Produced by: Walter Shenson
- Starring: Dudley Moore
- Cinematography: Billy Williams
- Edited by: Bill Blunden
- Music by: Dudley Moore
- Production company: Walter Shenson Productions
- Distributed by: Columbia Pictures
- Release date: 4 March 1968
- Running time: 86 minutes
- Country: United Kingdom
- Language: English

30 Is a Dangerous Age, Cynthia (also known as Thirty Is a Dangerous Age, Cynthia) is a 1968 British romantic comedy film, set in London and Dublin, directed by Joseph McGrath and starring Dudley Moore, Eddie Foy, Jr. and Suzy Kendall. It was written by Moore, McGrath and John Wells.

== Plot ==
London jazz pianist and aspiring composer Rupert Street is soon to turn 30 and fears reaching that age without having accomplished anything. To avoid this, he sets himself goals to marry a woman and write a musical. He meets the gorgeous but taken Louise, a fellow boarder, and pursues her in his goofy and inept manner. A fight with competing suitor Paul leaves Rupert with his right arm in a cast and unable to play the piano.

To avoid further distractions, Rupert travels to Dublin, where he finds success composing the musical, and he returns to London triumphant. However, his other goal is in jeopardy, as Louise has left for Birmingham with Paul.

In order to sign Rupert to a contract, the production's major investor forces his agent to send private eye Herbert Greenslade to Birmingham to find Louise. Reunited with Louise on his birthday, Rupert whisks her back to London to be married.

== Cast ==
- Dudley Moore as Rupert Street
- Eddie Foy, Jr. as Oscar
- Suzy Kendall as Louise Hammond
- John Bird as Herbert Greenslade
- Duncan Macrae as Jock McCue
- Patricia Routledge as Mrs. Woolley
- Peter Bayliss as Victor
- John Wells as Honorable Gavin Hopton
- Harry Towb as Mr. Woolley
- Jonathan Routh as Captain Gore-Taylor
- Ted Dicks, Jr. as Horst Cohen
- Nicky Henson as Paul
- Clive Dunn as doctor
- Frank Thornton as registrar
- Derek Farr as TV announcer
- Micheál MacLiammóir as Irish storyteller

== Reception ==
In a contemporary review for The New York Times, critic Renata Adler wrote: "The problem with the movie itself is that, like almost all of contemporary comedy, it has something sophomoric about it—one foot always behind in the university. This seems to stem from a sense in the movie and elsewhere that this particular generation of satirists has to make itself up out of whole cloth, that there are no useful precedents. ... What happens with the film—funny bits and pieces done really quite brilliantly—is that it is not quite worked through. There is no sense that anyone has made a completely, unironically committed effort to work clear through it. In this respect it is almost about what it is: fun, in under the wire of a deadline for talented young people to sustain an impression of promise, but not yet a completed work that anyone is exactly prepared to stand behind.

The Monthly Film Bulletin wrote: "Dudley Moore's exceptional gifts as a comedian and a musician are poorly served by the frantic direction of Joseph McGrath's film; and the leaden script—assembled rather than written by Moore, the director and John Wells—is little more than a collection of mildly diverting television sketches bound together by the thinnest of romantic plots. The constant injection of burlesque fantasy—Moore appearing as Beethoven, Mozart, Bach and Valentino amongst others—only highlights the paucity of the basic material, while Moore's endless repertoire of funny voices and facial contortions proves no substitute for a closely timed comic performance. Similarly, the repeated pans, wipes, jump cuts and bizarre montages that mark McGrath's direction prove no substitute for genuine style but merely underline the inadequacies of the script. Like Dudley Moore, most of the highly talented cast deserve something better than this."

Leslie Halliwell said: "Mild star vehicle for a very mild star, basically a few thin sketches, frantically overdirected."

The Radio Times Guide to Films gave the film 3/5 stars, writing: "This is one of those 1960s oddities, with everyone rushing around being breezily neurotic as nightclub musician Dudley Moore panics at the thought of imminently turning 30. Moore basically plays himself, even fronting his real-life jazz trio, and it works enjoyably enough, with Suzy Kendall suitably kooky and charming as the girl he chases. Not a movie that has aged with any dignity, but there are considerably worse examples of 'swinging' celluloid than this."
