= William Kelly Harrison =

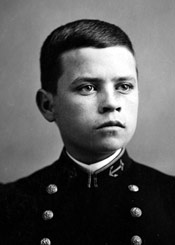
- Harrison as a U.S. Naval Academy midshipman
- Born: July 30, 1870; Waco, Texas
- Died: August 15, 1928 (aged 58); San Diego, California
- Burial place: Arlington National Cemetery
- Military career
- Allegiance: United States of America
- Branch: United States Navy
- Service years: 1889−1918
- Rank: Commander
- Commands: USS San Francisco
- Conflicts: Banana Wars; Battle of Veracruz
- Awards: Medal of Honor

William Kelly Harrison (July 30, 1870 – August 15, 1928) was born in Waco, Texas and died in San Diego, California. Harrison graduated from the United States Naval Academy in 1889. He received the Medal of Honor for actions at the United States occupation of Veracruz, 1914. He is a relative of President William Henry Harrison (genealogical research indicates that while they might have a shared ancestry, both families being from Virginia, there is no evidence of a direct relation). His son, William Kelly Harrison Jr. graduated from the United States Military Academy in 1917 and retired from the United States Army as a lieutenant general.

== Medal of Honor citation ==
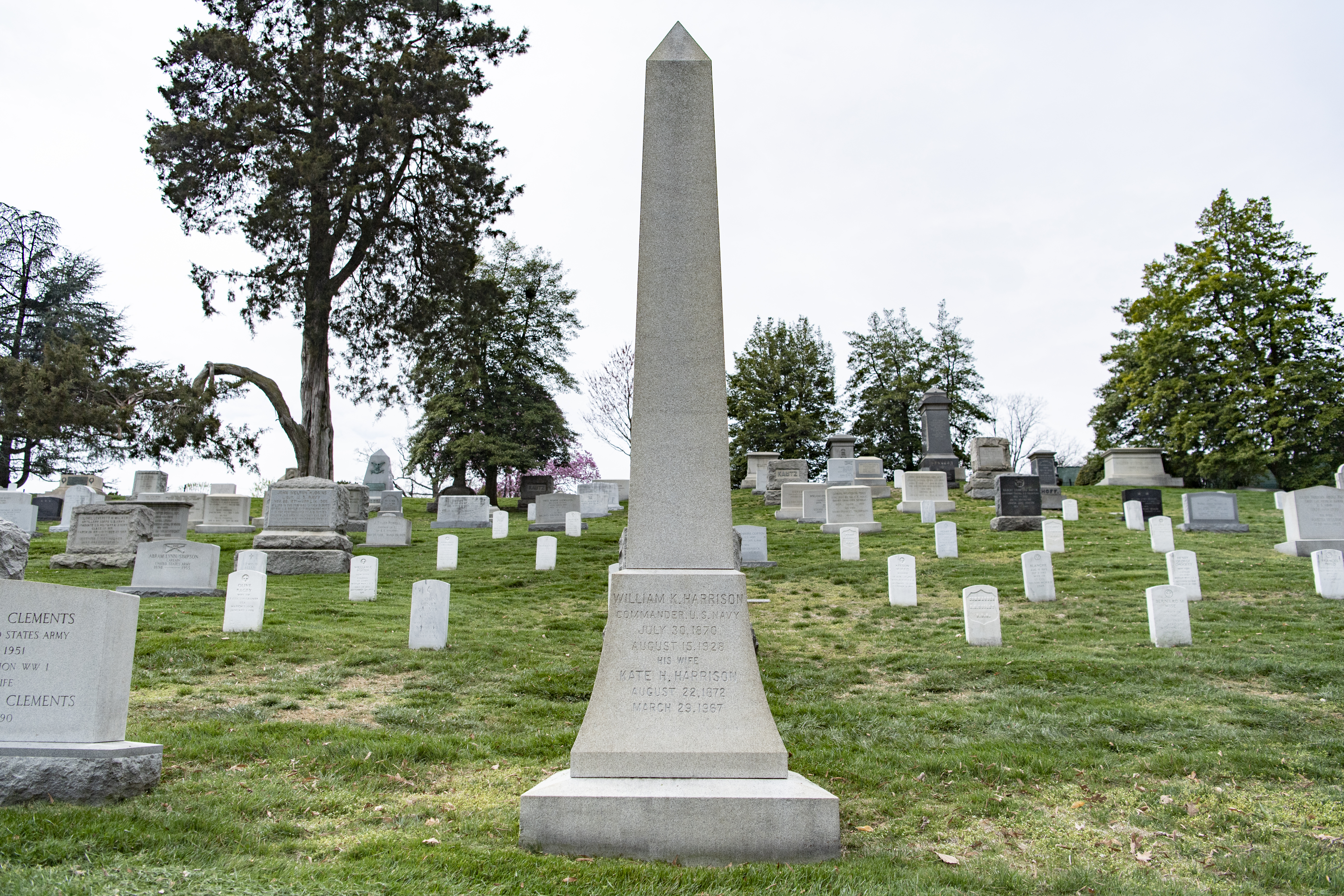
Grave at Arlington National Cemetery

Rank and organization: Commander Organization: U.S. Navy Born: 30 July 1870, Waco, Tex. Accredited to: Texas Date of Issue: 12/04/1915

Citation:

For distinguished conduct in battle, engagements of Vera Cruz, 21 and 22 April 1914. During this period, Comdr. Harrison brought his ship into the inner harbor during the nights of the 21st and 22d without the assistance of a pilot or navigational lights, and was in a position on the morning of the 22d to use his guns with telling effect at a critical time.

== See also ==
- List of Medal of Honor recipients (Veracruz)
- List of United States Naval Academy alumni (Medal of Honor)
