= John Bird (actor) =

English actor (1936–2022)

- Born: John Michael Bird; 22 November 1936; Bulwell, Nottinghamshire, England
- Died: 24 December 2022 (aged 86); Midhurst, West Sussex, England
- Education: King's College, Cambridge
- Occupation: Actor
- Years active: 1962–2017
- Spouses: Ann Stockdale (m. 1965; div. 1970) Bridget Simpson (m. 1975; div. 1978) Libby Crandon (died 2012)

John Michael Bird (22 November 1936 – 24 December 2022) was an English actor, director, writer and satirist. He performed in the television satire boom of the 1960s, appearing in That Was the Week That Was. His television work included many appearances with John Fortune.

Bird had an acting career in film, television, theatre and radio for over 55 years. He appeared in films including Take A Girl Like You (1970) and Jabberwocky (1977) as well as in television shows such as Joint Account, Marmalade Atkins, El C.I.D. and Chambers. He and Fortune also starred with Rory Bremner in the sketch show Bremner, Bird and Fortune (1993–2010), on Channel 4, which was nominated for BAFTA TV Awards.

== Early life ==
John Michael Bird was born in Bulwell, Nottingham, where his father ran a small chemist's shop. He lived at 445 Perry Road in New Basford, north of the (current) Nottingham Perry Road Sainsbury's.

He failed his 11-plus, but his secondary modern headmaster managed to have him transferred, aged 12, to High Pavement Grammar School. At grammar school, he honed his acting skills in the dramatic society. In late January 1955 at the Co-operative Arts Centre (the former George Street Particular Baptist Church, which is now the Nottingham Arts Theatre in the city centre), he appeared in a school production of Strife, by John Galsworthy (known for The Forsyte Saga), where he played David Roberts; Geoffrey Braman played Simon Harness and Michael Hurworth played John Anthony. The female parts were played by girls from the Manning School, a girls grammar school, notably Angela Williams and Jacqueline Le Vick. The play was produced by a modern languages teacher, and the same group of people had taken part in a production of Julius Caesar, the year before, where he played Brutus. At the Arts Centre, he appeared in many productions of the Nottingham County Theatre Company.

In 1956 he passed the entrance exam for King's College, Cambridge; he read English literature and stayed for postgraduate studies with a thesis entitled "European Drama 1888–1914". At Cambridge in 1958, he jointly wrote a review, deliberately against the style of works by writers such as Julian Slade, who he disliked. He found American politics far more interesting than British politics, in content, but realised that American politics was much more coarse and uncivilised in tone; he thought that British politics, instead, was a lot more disciplined, but possibly too disciplined and straight-laced. He took an interest in anarchy, after reading The Secret Agent by Joseph Conrad.

== Acting career ==
=== 1960s and 1970s ===
While studying at Cambridge, Bird met fellow King's student John Fortune. During the television satire boom of the 1960s, Bird appeared in That Was the Week That Was (1962–1963), the title of which he had coined. The stage director Ned Sherrin intended for him to play David Frost's role in the series but Bird was committed elsewhere. He also appeared in the television programmes Not So Much a Programme, More a Way of Life (1964–1965), and If It Moves File It (1970).

Bird acted in straight and comic roles in several television series and in films including My Father Knew Lloyd George (1965), Red and Blue (1967), A Dandy in Aspic (1968), 30 Is a Dangerous Age, Cynthia (1968), This, That and the Other (1969), Take A Girl Like You (1970), The Seven-Per-Cent Solution (1976) and Jabberwocky (1977). Bird also became an active stage director writer and actor, directing The Naming of Murderers’ Rock in 1960 at the Royal Court Theatre in London. He toured with the production One Over The Eight in 1961 and appeared in Alice in Wonderland, directed by Jonathan Miller in 1966. His stage career continued into the 1970s, with his writing of the adaptation of Council Of Love in 1970, which was shown at the Criterion Theatre in London, his appearance in Who’s Who? in 1972 in Guildford and Southsea and in Habeas Corpus by Alan Bennett at the Oxford Playhouse in 1973, as well as at the Lyric Theatre from 1973 to 1974.

During the 1970s, while Idi Amin was at the height of his infamy, Bird starred on the album The Collected Broadcasts of Idi Amin, with lyrics based on Alan Coren's anti-Amin Punch columns. In 1975 the single "Amazin' Man", from the album, was released on the Transatlantic label. The record stayed for 12 weeks in the Australian Singles Chart, peaking at number 26. In 1975, Bird starred in The Melting Pot, a sitcom written by Spike Milligan and Neil Shand: Milligan played Mr. Van Gogh (in brownface) alongside Bird as Mr. Rembrandt, father and son illegal Asian immigrants who are first seen being rowed ashore in England, having been told that the beach is in fact Piccadilly Circus. It was cancelled by the BBC after one episode had been broadcast. In 1979, Bird played an African chieftain in a cinema commercial for Silk Cut cigarettes. He played Raymond, a nervous boy who stuttered, in Dennis Potter's play Blue Remembered Hills which was also broadcast in 1979.

=== 1980s ===
In 1980 Bird appeared in The Dangerous Brothers. From 1981 to 1984, Bird made his mark in the world of children's entertainment taking the role of Mr Humphrey Atkins, the roguish father of Marmalade Atkins (played by Charlotte Coleman) for Thames Television. In 1982, Bird performed in the role of the Duke of Albany in the BBC Television Shakespeare production of King Lear. In 1984 he played the part of Jack Ormand, a local gang boss, in the tenth episode of the Granada TV series Travelling Man. From 1986 to 1988 he starred as Ernest Hemmingway, the university vice chancellor, in the first series of A Very Peculiar Practice, working alongside Peter Davison. Bird played the director of the British National Theatre in an episode of the BBC situation comedy Yes, Prime Minister broadcast in 1988. In 1988 he appeared in One Way Pendulum at the Old Vic Theatre. From 1989 to 1990, he played opposite Hannah Gordon in the 16-episode sitcom Joint Account which was set in a bank.

=== 1990–2017 ===
From 1990 to 1992, he starred in 18 episodes of the television detective series El C.I.D. which was set in Spain. The series was serious rather than comedy-based and co-starred Alfred Molina in the first two series and Amanda Redman in the third. In 1993, Bird featured in the role of Professor Plum in the fourth series of Cluedo and appeared as a newspaper editor in the political drama To Play the King. From 1996 to 2001, Bird starred as barrister John Fuller-Carp in the BBC radio and television sitcom Chambers. He starred as well in the BBC Radio 4 and BBC Two series Absolute Power with Stephen Fry. Bird guest-starred in two television series by writer David Renwick, namely in three episodes of the BBC mystery crime drama series Jonathan Creek as well as in one episode of the BBC sitcom One Foot in the Grave.

Bird worked with John Fortune and Rory Bremner in the Channel 4 sketch comedy show Bremner, Bird and Fortune, which was nominated for BAFTA TV Awards. In the series of sketches with Fortune, The Long Johns, one of the two men interviewed the other, with the latter in the guise of a senior figure such as a politician, businessman or government consultant. Invariably the character was named George Parr. In 2012, Bird appeared in the BBC produced TV film Bert and Dickie. Bird worked with David Renwick again in 2016 on the BBC Radio 4 comedy show Desolation Jests. Bird's final television appearance was in an episode of Midsomer Murders in 2017.

== Personal life and death ==
Bird married Ann Stockdale on 8 February 1965. They were married from 1965 to 1970; she was the daughter of Grant Stockdale, who served as the US ambassador to Ireland from 1961 to 1962, the marriage ended in divorce. He married television presenter Bridget Simpson in 1975; however, they divorced in 1978. He was unhappy in his private life and his career was stalled. He began drinking heavily and taking amphetamines. During the mid-1970s he was seriously ill, paranoid, and was contemplating suicide.

Bird lived with concert pianist and teacher Libby Crandon after 1978, and they later married. He had two stepsons from her previous marriage. Crandon died in 2012.

Bird died from complications of a stroke at Pendean House Care Home in Midhurst, West Sussex, on 24 December 2022, aged 86.

== Selected acting credits ==
- Source: John Bird at the British Film Institute

=== Film ===
- Red and Blue (1967)
- A Dandy in Aspic (1968)
- 30 Is a Dangerous Age, Cynthia (1968)
- This, That and the Other (1969)
- Take A Girl Like You (1970)
- The Breaking of Bumbo (1970)
- The Alf Garnett Saga (1972)
- The Seven-Per-Cent Solution (1976)
- Jabberwocky (1977)
- Yellow Pages (1985)
- A Fish Called Wanda (1988) (uncredited)
- The Strange Case of Delfina Potocka: The Mystery of Chopin (1999)

=== Television ===
- That Was the Week That Was (1962–1963)
- Not So Much a Programme, More a Way of Life (1964–1965)
- My Father Knew Lloyd George (1965)
- Alice in Wonderland (1966)
- If It Moves File It (1970)
- The Melting Pot (1975)
- Blue Remembered Hills (1979)
- The Dangerous Brothers (1980)
- Marmalade Atkins (1981–84)
- King Lear (1982)
- Travelling Man (1984)
- A Very Peculiar Practice (1986–8)
- Yes, Prime Minister (1988)
- Joint Account (1989–90)
- El C.I.D. (1990–2)
- Cluedo (1993)
- To Play the King (1993)
- Sooty & Co. (1993)
- Rory Bremner...Who Else? (1993–98) / Bremner, Bird and Fortune (1999–2010)
- One Foot in the Grave (1995)
- Chambers (2000–01)
- Jonathan Creek (2000, 2014)
- Absolute Power (2003–05)
- Bert and Dickie (2012)
- Midsomer Murders (2017)

=== Theatre ===
- The Naming of Murderers’ Rock (1960)
- One Over The Eight (1961)
- Alice in Wonderland (1966–67)
- Council Of Love (1970)
- Who’s Who? (1972)
- Habeas Corpus (1973–4)
- Murder in a Bad Light (1979)
- One Way Pendulum (1988)

=== Radio ===
- Chambers (1996–99)
- Absolute Power (2000–06)
- Desolation Jests (2016)
