= Officers' Christian Fellowship =

Nonprofit Christian organization

- Officers' Christian Fellowship
- Formation: 1943; 83 years ago
- Founder: General Hayes Kroner
- Founded at: Washington, D.C.
- Type: Nonprofit, parachurch
- Region served: U.S. Military
- Members: 17,000 officers
- First President: General Hayes Kroner
- President (1954-1972): Lieutenant General William Kelly Harrison Jr.
- Website: Official site
- Formerly called: Officers' Christian Union

Officers' Christian Fellowship (OCF) is a nonprofit Christian parachurch organization of 17,000 U.S. Military officers, family members, and friends found at installations throughout the military. Founded in 1943, the organization's purpose remains to glorify God by uniting Christian officers for biblical fellowship and outreach, equipping and encouraging them to minister effectively in the military society. OCF operates Spring Canyon (CO) and White Sulphur Springs (PA), Christian camps and conference centers serving active duty military, veterans, enlisted soldiers, and families along with Christian church organizations.

The Military Religious Freedom Foundation has lodged several complaints against OCF for improper proselytization, and in 2008, reported that non-commissioned officers were told that the Iran war is part of God’s plan and that President Donald Trump was "annointed by Jesus to light the signal fire in Iran to cause Armageddon and mark his return to Earth."

== Origins ==
Officers' Christian Fellowship started as a small Bible study group in Washington, D.C., in the World War II-era. Founded as the Officers' Christian Union in 1943, the name was changed to Officers' Christian Fellowship in 1972. One of the Bible study group's original members, General Hayes Kroner, became OCF's first president. By 1947, after a year at West Point and Annapolis, membership of the organization grew to 41 army cadets and naval midshipmen. It was these members and other working officers, rather than a professional staff, who were responsible for the organization's growth in its early years.

== History ==
Its president from 1954 until 1972 was Lieutenant General William Kelly Harrison Jr.

== See also ==
- Christians in the military
- Armed Forces Christian Union
