= Christians in the military =

Christians have been present in the military since after the death of Jesus, Marinus of Caesarea, Julius the Veteran, and other military saints were Christians who were soldiers.

Other Christians, such as Maximilian of Tebessa, were conscientious objectors, believing that the Bible supported Christian pacifism.

== Early Christianity ==
In the first centuries after the time of Jesus, some soldiers decided to follow Christianity, but few Christians decided to join the military voluntarily. In the second century, Celsus accused Christians of shirking their civic duty by refusing to serve in the army; Origen, a Christian scholar, agreed with this accusation, but suggested that Christians serve their communities in different ways. The main reason for this was that Christianity was seen as a religion of love and peace; therefore war and killing was seen as being in opposition to a Christian life. However, other aspects of army life, such as arresting Christians and taking part in mandatory pagan practices and sacrifices, would also have been at odds with Christianity. Origen believed in the idea of a "just war", but also believed that Christians could not be part of military warfare.

In the third century Tertullian asked if it was possible for a Christian to "ask a watchword from the emperor who has already received one from God", as well as noting that Jesus had taught that "he who lives by the sword shall die by the sword"; however he did believe that Christians should be loyal citizens and pray for their emperor.

In 212, the Constitutio Antoniniana was issued by the Roman emperor Caracalla. This stated that all free men in the empire were to be given full Roman citizenship. This, combined with the later conversion of Constantine, brought a halt to religious persecution of Christians and after some time, some Christians began to look at the military as a possible career. It has been suggested that this would later underpin the enforcement of uniform religious belief.

Under the Emperor Diocletian, attempts were made to purge Christians from the army in 299. However, the Roman army continued to include many Christians, and the presence of large numbers of Christians in his army may have been a factor in the conversion of Constantine I to Christianity.

== Christianity and the "Just War" ==
After Constantine's conversion to Christianity, theologians began to look at war and the military in detail. In the fifth century, Saint Augustine took Romans 13:4 as a basis for each Christian to decide for themselves if they wished to join an army. He also noted that "No war is undertaken by a good state except on behalf of good faith or for safety"

The Orthodox Church took the view that it was better to change the soul of the enemy rather than to kill them; however, they also saw an obligation to defend against a threat, and as such saw war as a lesser, necessary evil.

In the 13th century, Thomas Aquinas set out the criteria for a just war in the Summa Theologica. His ideas, based on Christian mercy, influenced rulers and military for several centuries.

== Holy war ==
Over the next few centuries, Christians had less reservations about joining an army, especially for a 'holy war'. In particular, the Crusades were initiated as a necessary war to reclaim the Holy Land against the enemies of God and were supported by Pope Urban II, who offered religious rewards of forgiveness of sins and glory in heaven to those who joined the conflict. The armed Order of the Knights Templar was a set up during this time.

== The Reformation ==
When large groups of Christians broke away from the Roman Catholic church in the 16th century, many of them followed theologians such as John Calvin and Zwingli. Calvin's beliefs included the Just War tradition and the idea that war was justified as a means of preserving the peace. Zwingli was originally a chaplain in the Swiss Mercenary Army and his experiences there led to him championing the case against mercenaries. However, he did support the use of the military in 'holy war' to forcibly convert others to his own denomination of Christianity and he died in battle.

From the start of the Reformation some groups, particularly Anabaptists, took the position of pacificism and refused to be part of politics or the military; with followers being executed for this belief.

== Conscientious objectors ==
In 1575 Mennonite Christians in the Netherlands whose consciences would not allow them to join the military were exempted from military service if they paid a sum of money to the king.

In England, the Militia Act was created in 1757. Militia members were selected by ballot, but Quakers were allowed to pay £10 (approximately £2300 in 2023) to nominate a substitute to take their place. A number of Quakers objected to both these options and were imprisoned; this continued for several decades. In the lead-up to WWI, the Quakers' Yearly Meeting stated "We must continue to offer strenuous opposition to the establishment in any part of the British Empire of a system of compulsory military training.": however, after the war began, about 30% of members enlisted. There were several conscientious objects among the Quakers, including seven who died in England during the war. During the war a No-Conscription Fellowship was set up and by 1916, there was a British conscience clause which allowed conscientious objectors to argue for their non-conscription in front of a tribunal.

In the US, out of 2,100 people who objected to joining the war due to religious reasons, 1890 of them agreed to take on non-combative work, mainly in factories and farms. Figures such as Ben Salmon inspired other Christians to take part in anti-war efforts.

The presence of Christians on both sides led to the unofficial Christmas truces of World War I, commemorated in the film Joyeux Noël.

In the late 20th century, several Christian denominations preached a complete ban on all combatant service, including Seventh-day Adventists, Jehovah's Witnesses and Christadelphians, as well as Anabaptists such as Mennonites and the Amish. This can lead to social pressure and possible arrest, especially during times of war.

In 2023, this discussion has come to the fore in both Ukraine and Russia.

== 21st century ==
Many denominations will see the choice of carrying out military service as being a personal and individual one. Some churches will ask their members to review the state of their country before agreeing to join its military.

In the last few decades, many Christians have joined military forces in countries around the world. There are a number of support groups which publicly declare their work, including Armed Forces' Christian Union, Military Ministries International, Defence Christian Network and Military Christian Fellowship, which has several groups around the world.

There is an ongoing public debate in Christianity about the place of Christians in the military.

Military chaplains minister to Christians serving in the military forces of many countries. Organisations such as the Armed Forces Christian Union (UK) and Officers' Christian Fellowship (US) are made up of Christians in the military. In 2003, Anglicans and Protestants comprised around 35% of the Australian Defence Force while Catholics comprised 25%. By 2020, Anglicans and Protestants comprised 20% of the Force while Catholics comprised 18%.

== Religion in the US military ==
The separation of church and state in the US means that legally Christianity does not have a special place in the military.

50.5% of US military members identify as Protestant and Non Denominational Christians. In 2009, the majority of overall US veterans and WWII US veterans were Protestants.

== Religion in the UK military ==
In 2022, 60.% of the UK Regular Forces stated that they had a Christian background.

== See also ==
- Armed priests
- Christianity and violence
- Christian soldier (disambiguation)
- Janissary
- Just war theory
- New Testament military metaphors
- Desmond Doss
- Hacksaw Ridge
