= The Collected Broadcasts of Idi Amin =

Studio album by John Bird
- Released: 1975
- Genre: Comedy
- Length: 34 minutes

The Collected Broadcasts of Idi Amin is a British comedy album parodying Ugandan dictator Idi Amin, released in 1975 on Transatlantic Records. It was performed by John Bird and written by Alan Coren, being based on columns he wrote for Punch magazine.

== Track listing ==
1. Gunboat Dipperlomacy
2. Star Gittin' Born
3. Time Check
4. Findin' De Lady
5. Public Announcement
6. Way to De Stars
7. Costa Uganda
8. S.O.S
9. Up Fo' Grabs
10. Amazin' Man (played a number of times on the Dr. Demento show)
11. Weather Forecast
12. De Colleckerted Works O' Idi Amin
