= New Testament athletic metaphors =

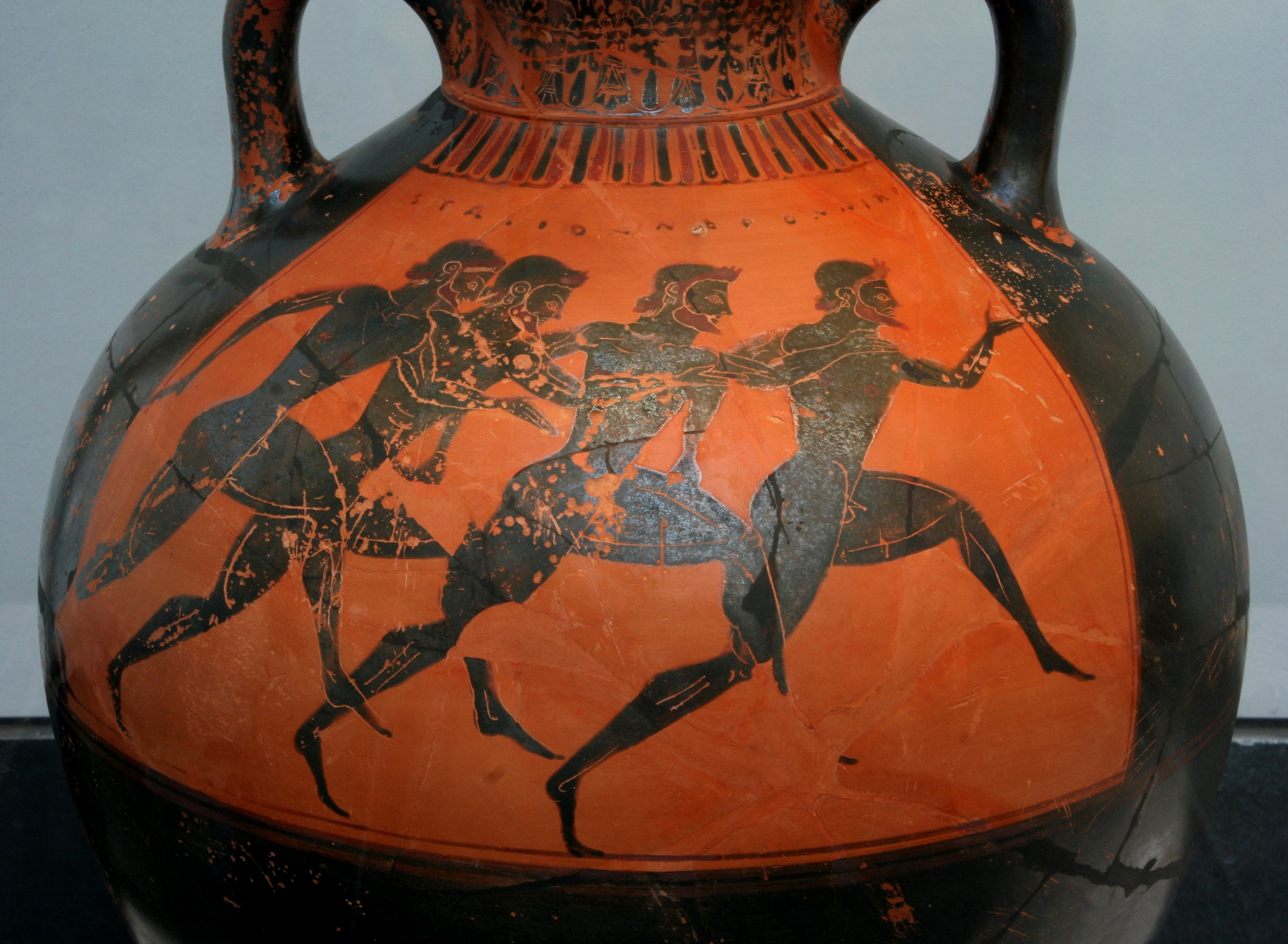
Ancient Greek race at the Panathenaic Games, illustrated on a Greek vase. Like the Isthmian Games of Corinth, the Panathenaic Games continued into early Christian times.

The New Testament uses several athletic metaphors in discussing Christianity, especially in the Pauline epistles and the Epistle to the Hebrews. Such metaphors also appear in the writings of contemporary philosophers, such as Epictetus and Philo, drawing on the tradition of the Olympic Games.

== New Testament examples ==
The metaphor of running a race "with perseverance" appears in Hebrews 12:1; related metaphors appear in Philippians 2:16, Galatians 2:2, and Galatians 5:7. In 2 Timothy 4:7, Paul writes "I have fought the good fight, I have finished the race, I have kept the faith."

The ancient Olympic Games may have influenced New Testament use of the imagery. In 1 Corinthians 9:24–26, written to the city that hosted the Isthmian Games, the metaphor is extended from running to other games, such as boxing, to make the point that winning a prize requires discipline, self-control, and coordinated activity. In 2 Timothy 2:5, the same point is made.

== Later usage ==
These athletic metaphors are also echoed in later Christian writing.

As with New Testament military metaphors, the metaphors also appear in many hymns, such as "Fight the Good Fight" and "Angel Band". New Testament athletic metaphors were embraced by advocates of muscular Christianity, both in the Victorian era and in later times.
