= Armor of God =

Biblical phrase from Ephesians 6

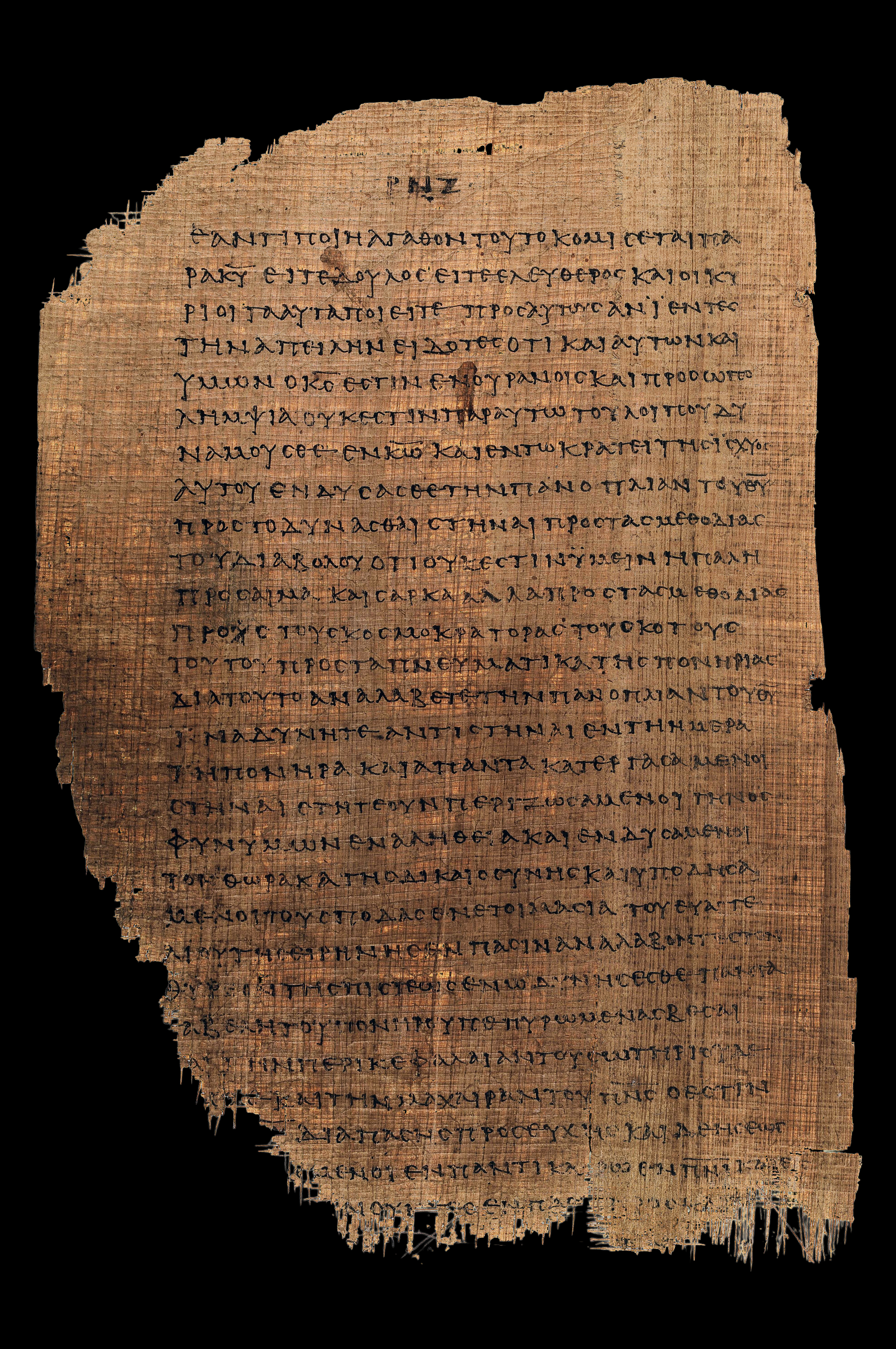
Ephesians 6:8–18 on Papyrus 46 (fol. 157 verso; c. AD 200)

The phrase "Armor of God" (Ancient Greek: πανοπλίαν τοῦ Θεοῦ, panoplian tou Theou) is derived from Ephesians 6:11 in the New Testament: "Put on the whole armour of God, that ye may be able to stand against the wiles of the devil." (King James Version).

In its New Testament usage, the metaphor may refer to physical armour worn by God in metaphorical battles, or it may refer to vigilant righteousness in general as bestowed by the grace of God (Romans 13:12, King James Version): "The night is far spent, the day is at hand: let us therefore cast off the works of darkness, and let us put on the armour of light."

== Context and interpretation ==
The Epistle to the Ephesians was written by the Apostle Paul while he was under house arrest around 61-63 CE. Ephesians was not originally addressed to the Church of the Ephesians but rather “to the holy ones who are faithful in Christ Jesus". This was later changed to say "to the holy ones in Ephesus who are faithful in Christ Jesus". In Chapter 6:10-18, Paul focuses on the idea of believers and members of the Church resisting evil and keeping firm in their faith. In these verses, he instructs the Church to put on the whole "armor of God" to prepare for the spiritual battle coming against Satan and his wiles.

Various scholars have different interpretations of what this means: some believe that the Armor of God referenced is the same spiritual armor that he and his messiah wore in battle, while others believe the armor is Christ himself, and equipping oneself would be to metaphorically "put on Christ himself".

== Armorial items ==
Six pieces of armor are mentioned:

- helmet
- breastplate
- belt
- footwear
- shield
- sword

These items as described in Ephesians as the helmet of salvation, the breastplate of righteousness, the belt or girdle of truth ("loins girt with truth"), shoes of peace (feet with the preparation of the gospel of peace), the shield of faith, and the sword of the spirit or word of God.

The helmet of salvation and the breastplate of righteousness also appear in Isaiah 59:17. The "breastplate of faith and love", and a helmet as "the hope of salvation" appear in 1 Thessalonians 5:8.

== See also ==
- Bibleman
- Miles Christianus
- New Testament military metaphors
- Shield of the Trinity
- Soldiers of Christ, Arise
- Territorial spirit
