= Alan Coren =

English humorist and writer (1938–2007)

- Born: 27 June 1938; London, England
- Died: 18 October 2007 (aged 69); London, England
- Resting place: Hampstead Cemetery
- Education: Wadham College, Oxford (BA); Yale University (attended); University of California, Berkeley (attended)
- Occupations: Humourist, writer, broadcaster, editor
- Spouse: Anne Kasriel (m. 1963)
- Children: Giles; Victoria
- Relatives: Michael Coren (cousin)

Alan Coren (27 June 1938 – 18 October 2007) was an English writer, humorist, broadcaster and satirist. He was a regular panellist on the BBC Radio quiz The News Quiz and a team captain on BBC television's Call My Bluff. Coren was the editor of Punch for almost a decade; later, he edited The Listener magazine.

== Early life and education ==
Alan Coren was born into an Orthodox Jewish family in East Barnet, Hertfordshire, in 1938, the son of builder and plumber Samuel Coren and his wife Martha, a hairdresser. In the introduction to Chocolate and Cuckoo Clocks: The Essential Alan Coren, Alan's children Giles and Victoria Coren conclude that their grandfather Samuel Coren was "an odd job man really" and had also apparently been a debt collector.

Coren was educated at Osidge Primary School and East Barnet Grammar School. Having gained a scholarship, he studied English at Wadham College, Oxford. He graduated from the University of Oxford with a first class Bachelor of Arts (BA) degree in 1960: as per tradition, his BA degree was promoted to a Master of Arts (MA Oxon) degree. Having won a Harkness Fellowship, he then studied for a doctorate in modern American literature at Yale University and the University of California, Berkeley. He did not complete his PhD degree.

== Career ==
Coren considered an academic career, but in 1963 was offered a writing position with the humour magazine Punch. He accepted and worked at Punch, in various roles, for twenty-four years. He had started off his writing career by selling articles to Punch, while at the same time also writing for The New Yorker.

=== Editor ===
In 1966, he became Punch's literary editor, becoming deputy editor in 1969 and editor in 1977. He remained as editor until 1987 when the circulation began to decline.

During the week in which he took over the editorship, The Jewish Chronicle published a profile of him. According to journalist and fellow Punch writer Miles Kington, Coren's response was to rush around the office, waving a copy of the relevant edition, saying: "This is ridiculous – I haven't been Jewish for years!"

When Coren left Punch in 1987, he became editor of The Listener, continuing in that role until 1989.

=== Columnist ===
From 1971 to 1978, Coren wrote a television review column for The Times.

From 1972 to 1976, he wrote a humorous column for the Daily Mail. He also wrote for The Observer, Tatler, and The Times.

From 1984, Coren worked as a television critic for The Mail on Sunday until he moved as a humorous columnist to the Sunday Express, which he left in 1996. In 1989, he began to contribute a column in The Times, which continued for the rest of his life.

=== Broadcaster ===
Coren began his broadcasting career in 1977. He was invited to be one of the regular panellists on BBC Radio 4's new satirical quiz show, The News Quiz. He continued on The News Quiz until the year he died.

From 1996 to 2004, he was one of two team captains on the UK panel game Call My Bluff.

=== Book author and scriptwriter ===
In 1978, he wrote The Losers, a sitcom about a wrestling promoter starring Leonard Rossiter and Alfred Molina.

Coren published about twenty books during his life, many of which were collections of his newspaper columns, such as Golfing for Cats and The Cricklewood Diet.

From 1976 to 1983, he wrote the Arthur series of children's books.

One of his most successful books, The Collected Bulletins of Idi Amin (a collection of his Punch articles about Amin) was rejected for publication in the United States on the grounds of racial sensitivity. They were written in a fictional English dialect, purportedly as used by African English speakers. Coren later considered his use of an ersatz dialect in portraying a person from Africa as in poor taste. These Bulletins were later made into a comedy album, The Collected Broadcasts of Idi Amin with the actor John Bird.

Coren's other books include:

- The Dog It Was That Died (1965)
- The Sanity Inspector (1974)
- All Except The Bastard (1978)
- The Lady from Stalingrad Mansions (1978)
- The Rhinestone as Big as the Ritz (1979)
- Tissues for Men (1981)
- Bumf (1984)
- Seems Like Old Times: A Year in the Life of Alan Coren (1989)
- More Like Old Times (1990)
- A Year in Cricklewood (1991)
- Toujours Cricklewood? (1993)
- Alan Coren's Sunday Best (1993)
- A Bit on the Side (1995)
- Alan Coren Omnibus (1996)
- The Cricklewood Dome (1998)
- The Cricklewood Tapestry (2002)
- Waiting for Jeffrey (2002)

Coren's final book, 69 For One, was published late in 2007.

== Honours ==
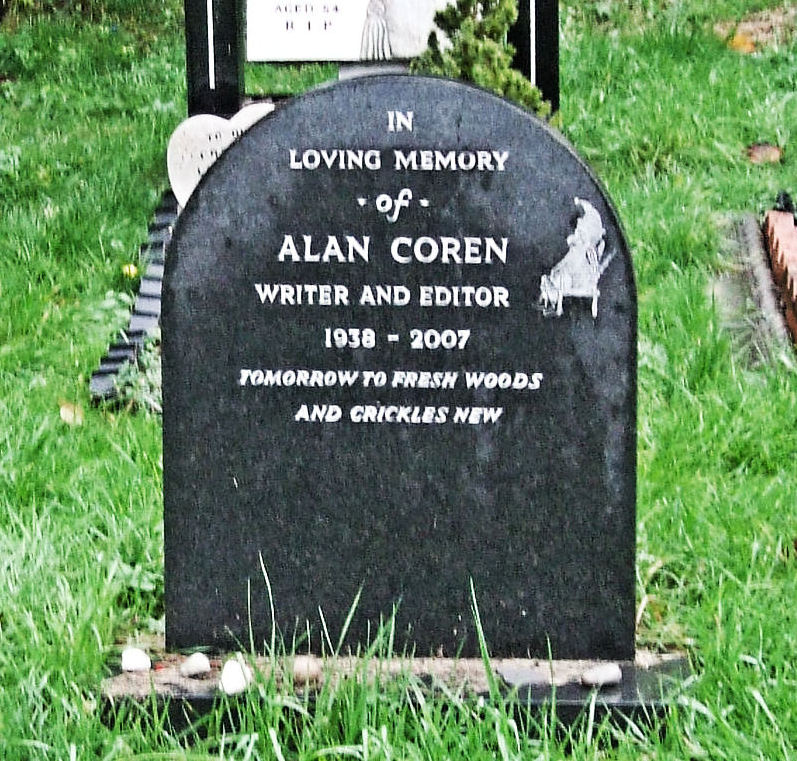
The grave of Alan Coren, Hampstead Cemetery, London.

In 1973, Coren became the Rector of the University of St Andrews, after John Cleese. He held the position until 1976.

== Personal life ==
In 1963, Coren married Anne Kasriel, a consultant anaesthetist at Moorfields Eye Hospital. The couple went on to have two children, Giles and Victoria, who both became journalists, while the latter became known for presenting the BBC quiz show Only Connect.

=== Illness ===
In May 2006, Coren was bitten by an insect that gave him septicaemia, which led to his developing necrotising fasciitis.

== Death and legacy ==
Coren died from lung cancer in 2007 at his home in north London. He is buried at Hampstead Cemetery in north London.

An anthology of his writings, called The Essential Alan Coren – Chocolate and Cuckoo Clocks and edited by his children, was published in October 2008.

Coren is commemorated by a short road named Alan Coren Close, Cricklewood, London NW2 6GL.

Academic offices
Preceded by John Cleese	Rector of the University of St Andrews; 1973–1976	Succeeded by Frank Muir
