= William Kelly Harrison Jr. =

United States Army general (1895–1987)

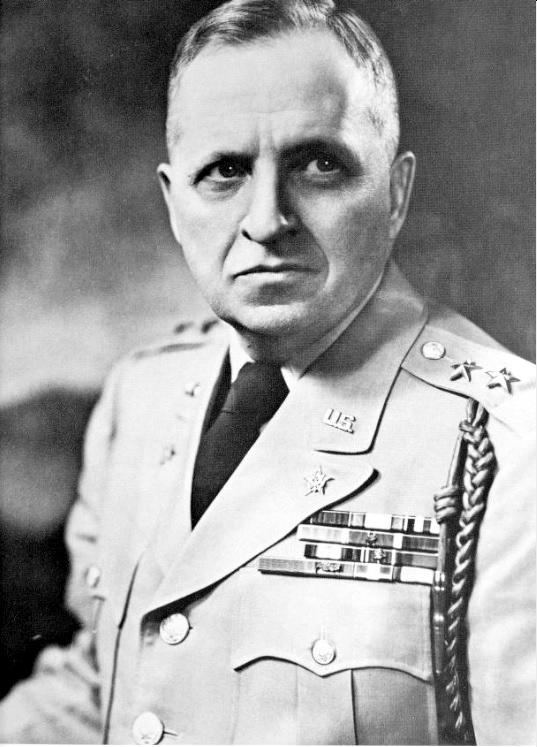
- Harrison as Major General in 1949
- Born: September 7, 1895; Washington, D.C., United States
- Died: May 25, 1987 (aged 91); Bryn Mawr, Pennsylvania, United States
- Burial place: Arlington National Cemetery
- Relatives: William Kelly Harrison (father)
- Military career
- Allegiance: United States
- Branch: United States Army
- Service years: 1917–1957
- Rank: Lieutenant General
- Nickname: "Billy"
- Service number: 0-5279
- Unit: Cavalry Branch
- Commands: U.S. Caribbean Command; 9th Infantry Division; 2nd Infantry Division
- Conflicts: World War I; World War II; Battle of Normandy; Battle of Saint-Lô; Battle of Mortain; Battle of Aachen; Siegfried Line Campaign; Battle of the Bulge; Rhineland Campaign; Korean War; Jamestown Line
- Awards: Distinguished Service Cross; Distinguished Service Medal (2); Legion of Merit; Silver Star; Bronze Star Medal (2); Purple Heart
- Other work: President, Officers' Christian Fellowship

William Kelly Harrison Jr. (September 7, 1895 – May 25, 1987) was a highly decorated officer in the United States Army with the rank of Lieutenant General. A graduate of the United States Military Academy, he rose through the ranks to brigadier general during World War II and distinguished himself in combat several times, while serving as the assistant division commander of the 30th Infantry Division during the Normandy Campaign and the Battle of the Bulge. Harrison was decorated with the Distinguished Service Cross, the second highest decoration of the United States military for bravery in combat, for his actions during Operation Cobra.

Following the War, Harrison remained in the Army and after several stateside assignments, he was ordered to the Far East, where he served as head of the United Nations Command armistice delegation in the Korean War. He participated in the truce talks, which concluded with the signing of the Korean Armistice Agreement on July 27, 1953. Harrison completed his career as the commanding general of U.S. Caribbean Command in early 1957.

== Early career ==
William Kelly Harrison Jr. was born on September 7, 1895, in Washington, D.C. as the son of Naval officer and future Medal of Honor recipient, William Kelly Harrison and his wife Kate Harris. Following high school, William Jr. received a senatorial appointment from Texas to the United States Military Academy at West Point, New York in May 1913.

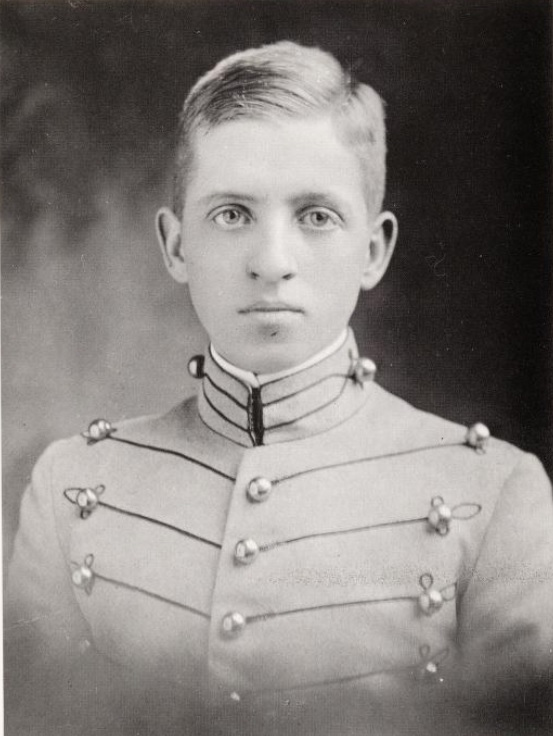
Harrison Jr. as Cadet at West Point in 1913.

Harrison graduated, 73rd in a class of 139, with a Bachelor of Science degree on April 20, 1917, shortly following the United States entry into World War I, and was commissioned a second lieutenant in the cavalry branch. He was subsequently ordered to Camp Lawrence J. Hearn, California, where he joined the 1st Cavalry Regiment.

He was subsequently ordered with the regiment to Douglas, Arizona, from which his unit participated in the guard duties on the Mexican Border. Harrison reached consecutively the ranks of first lieutenant and captain and returned to West Point Military Academy as an instructor of French and Spanish languages. While in this capacity, he also completed advanced languages courses in French and Spanish.

Harrison was later transferred to the 7th Cavalry Regiment at Fort Bliss, Texas and served with that unit until early 1923, when he was ordered to Washington, D.C. for duty on the staff of the Army War College. He was promoted to major during his service there and left for the Philippines in 1925, where he was attached to the 26th Cavalry Regiment (Philippine Scouts) at Camp Stotsenburg on Luzon.

Following his return stateside in 1932, Harrison was attached to the 7th Cavalry Regiment at Fort Riley, Kansas. While stationed at Fort Riley, he completed the advanced course at the Army Cavalry School there and served on the Cavalry Board and as a troop commander with the 9th Cavalry Regiment.

Harrison was ordered to the Army Command and General Staff School at Fort Leavenworth, Kansas in June 1936 and graduated one year later. He then joined the faculty of the school and served as an instructor of tactics until September 1937, when he was ordered to the Army War College for instruction.

He graduated in July 1938 and joined the 6th Cavalry Regiment at Fort Oglethorpe, Georgia. Harrison remained in that assignment until August 1939, when he was attached to the War Plans Division, War Department General Staff in Washington, D.C. While in this capacity, he was promoted to lieutenant colonel on July 1, 1940.

== World War II ==
=== Stateside service ===
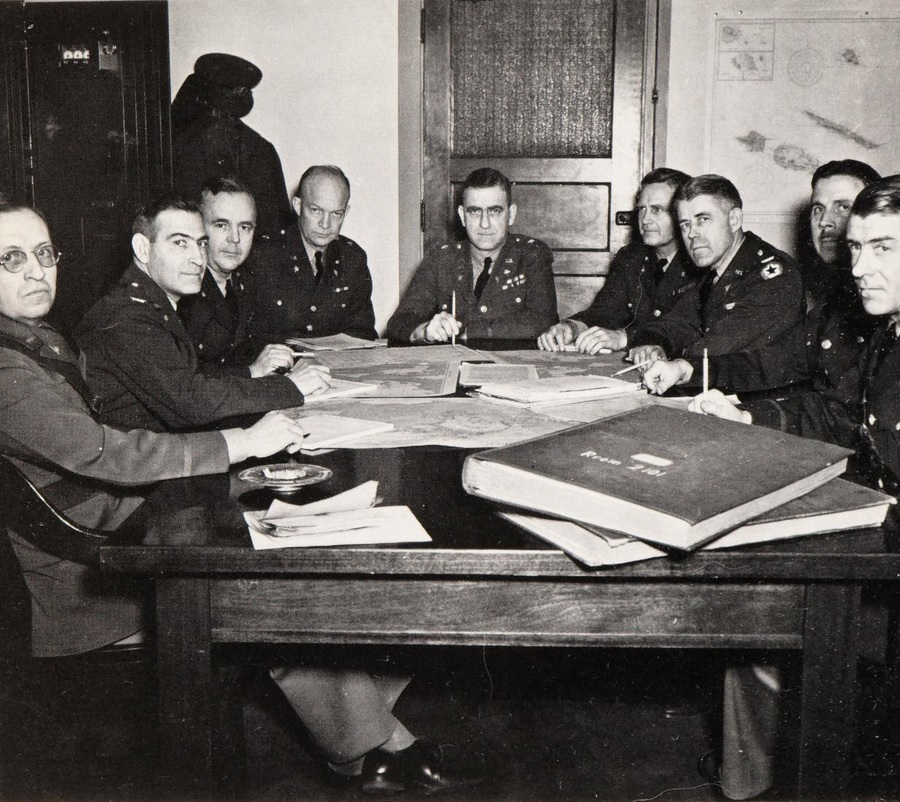
The meeting of War Plans Division, War Department General Staff in 1942. From left to right: Harrison, Lee S. Gerow, Crawford, Eisenhower, Leonard T. Gerow, Handy, Sherrill, McKee and MacKelvie.

Following the American entry into World War II, Harrison was promoted to the temporary rank of colonel on December 11, 1941, just four days after the Japanese attack on Pearl Harbor. He was appointed the deputy chief of the Strategy and Policy Group, War Plans Division, War Department General Staff and also was given additional duty at Army Chief of Staff General George C. Marshall's Committee on Allocation of Responsibilities which was given the job of figuring out a reorganization of the Army high command. For his service in this capacity, Harrison was promoted to the temporary rank of brigadier general on June 26, 1942.

He was subsequently ordered to Camp Butner, North Carolina, where he was attached to the 78th Infantry Division under Major General Edwin P. Parker Jr. as Assistant Division Commander (ADC). Harrison then participated in the training of replacements for units serving overseas but suffered a minor injury on an obstacle course in December 1942. While recuperating, he received a telephone call from Major General Leland Hobbs, then in command of the 30th Infantry Division, informing him about his new assignment with Hobbs' 30th Division.

Harrison was replaced by Brigadier General John K. Rice and appointed ADC under Hobbs, who tasked him with organization of the 30th Infantry Division's training at Camp Blanding, Florida. Harrison and Hobbs had known each other from West Point, where Hobbs was a member of the Class of 1915. They also were in the same class at the Army Command and General Staff School in 1937.

Billy Harrison had almost no respect for Hobbs as a leader of the troops. From Harrison's point of view, Hobbs violated every principle of leadership except one: He demanded obedience and gave it to his superiors. But in almost every other aspect, from training and disciplining men to planning battle operations in the field, Harrison described Hobbs as being "stricly [sic?] a Barracks soldier", who accustomed himself to applause.

Despite this, Harrison remained loyal to Hobbs, who never received anything than support from his ADC. On the other hand, Harrison benefited from Hobbs's apparent weakness, when he had the opportunity to be with his men during the training and later in combat.

Harrison participated in the training of his troops for the upcoming Tennessee Maneuvers in September–November 1943, where the 30th Division showed considerable alertness and skills. Following the maneuvers, the division moved to Camp Atterbury, Indiana, where it concentrated on preparation for movement overseas.

=== Overseas duty ===
Harrison led a divisional advanced party overseas by the end of January 1944 and spent the next several months in intensive training in England. The 30th Infantry Division departed for France in June that year and landed at Omaha Beach, Normandy on June 11, 1944. Harrison participated in the combat at Vire-et-Taute Canal and on Vire River and quickly won the admiration of his troops by accompanying them on the front lines with M3 submachine gun in hand. He also spent his first night in France in a trench with combat troops.

On July 25, 1944, the 30th Infantry Division participated in combat near Saint-Lô, which it secured a few days earlier. The division was subsequently scheduled to participate in Operation Cobra, an offensive with the intention to advance into Brittany. The offensive was to begin with a major saturation bombing of the enemy with the troops then moving in afterward, but due to inaccurate plane navigation, the planes erroneously bombed their own men. More than 600 men were hit, many killed, including Lieutenant General Lesley J. McNair, Commander of Army Ground Forces.

Even though Harrison's command group was located in the rear, he returned deliberately to the forward area shortly before the bombing began. He was thrown down by the blast of German artillery fire, but was unharmed. Realizing that the success of the entire operation depended on the 30th Infantry Division carrying out its mission, Harrison began analyzing the situation and found out that the divisional Sherman tanks were totally disorganized and demoralized infantry was spread in the area. Moreover, the commanding officer of 120th Infantry Regiment, Colonel Hammond D. Birks was located somewhere in the forward area and his jeep was knocked out.

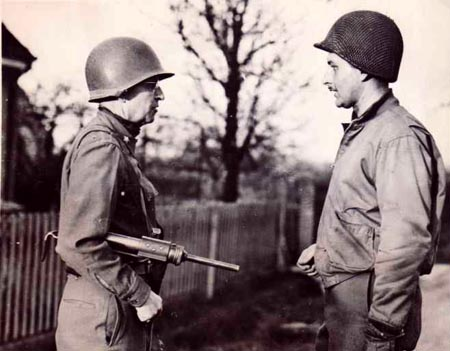
Harrison, armed with M3 submachine gun in conversation with Capt. John E. Kent, Co. A, 117th Infantry Regiment somewhere in France, fall 1944.

Harrison ordered the commander to get his tanks in battle formation and get ready for action and evacuated Colonel Birks to safety. He took a soldier with a bazooka through a hedgerow and ordered him to attack a German tank nearby. The soldier hit the German tank several times, but panicked and ran into the open, where he was killed. Harrison crawled back and came upon four American tanks in a neighboring field, who were waiting out the enemy shelling with their hatches shut tight. He climbed on the commander's tank and forced the crew to open the hatch by beating on the tank's turret, subsequently ordering the general attack, which was successful. For his heroism in action, he was decorated with the Distinguished Service Cross, the second highest decoration of the United States military for valor in combat.

Harrison then participated in the Battle of Mortain, the German drive to Avranches in mid-August 1944. The 30th Division clashed with the elite 1st SS Panzer Division Leibstandarte SS Adolf Hitler. The 30th Division then advanced through Belgium and Harrison distinguished himself again on September 2, 1944, while leading the Task Force of his division.

He was riding with the forward elements of his Task Force heading to Rumilly, when his column was ambushed by enemy tanks. Harrison's jeep was hit in the radiator and he was struck by an enemy 75mm tank shell, hitting his right shoulder, arm and leg. Harrison escaped from the damaged vehicle and hit the ditch, where he immediately dispatched his aide and driver to contact the next ranking officer in order that he might continue the advance. He did not mention his wounds, which were not visible due to his raincoat and crawled approximately 600 yards to the rear of the column in order to give further instructions for continuing the mission.

Harrison fainted momentarily due to his wounds, but refused to be evacuated until he had contacted his subordinates and instructed them in the continuation of the attack. By that time, General Hobbs had arrived and following the discovery of Harrison's wounds, he ordered Harrison's evacuation. For bravery in action, he was decorated with the Silver Star and also received the Purple Heart for his wounds, of which he was most proud.

He spent a week in the First Army Hospital in Versailles and rejoined his division in the Belgian town of Tongres, where the division's progress was halted due to fuel shortages and quagmire roads. The 30th Division then proceeded to the Netherlands, where they liberated the town of Kerkrade on September 25, 1944, and advanced to Germany, where they took part in the combat on the Siegfried Line and subsequently in the battle of the heavily defended city of Aachen on October 2.

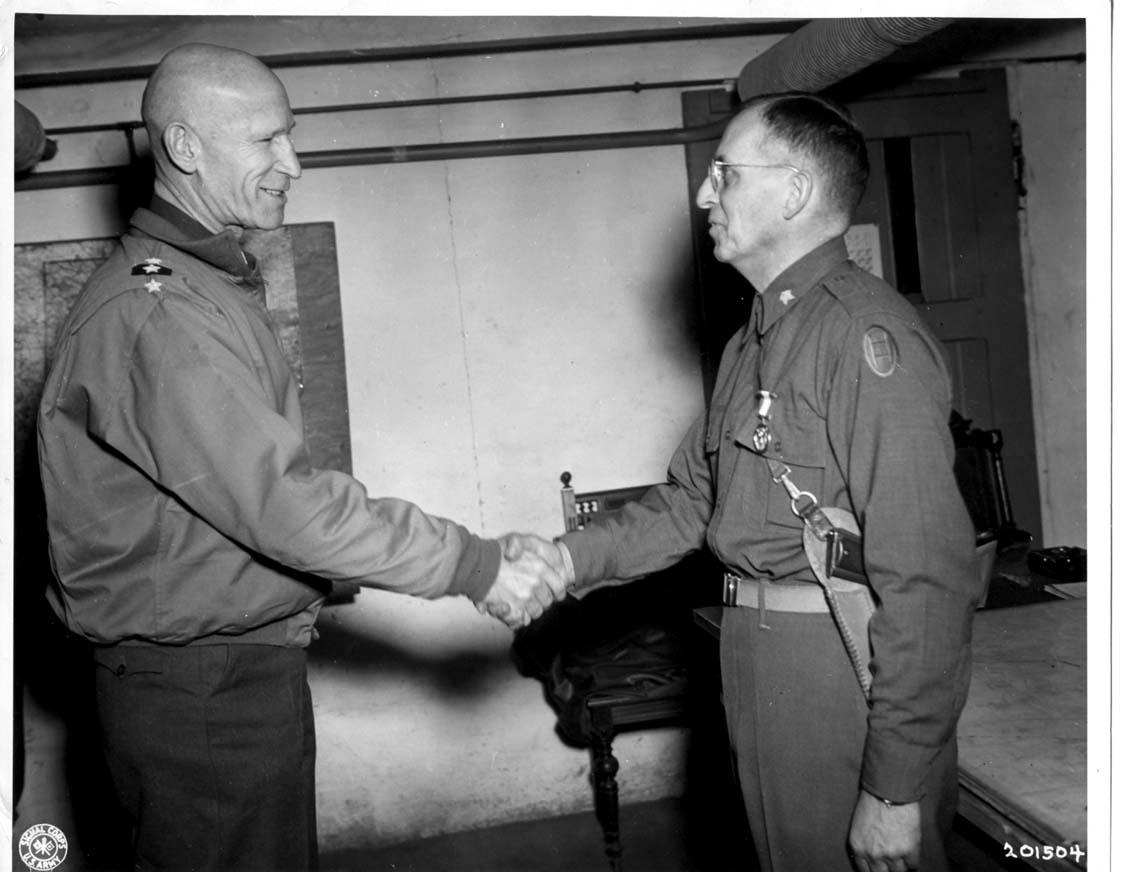
Lieut. Gen. William H. Simpson (commanding general, Ninth Army) congratulates Harrison upon his decoration with the Army Distinguished Service Medal for his previous service with the War Plans Division, War Department General Staff. Germany, February 1945.

The 30th Infantry Division was ordered for rest and refit to the rear by the end of November 1944 and transferred to the Ninth United States Army under Lieutenant General William H. Simpson. Harrison was tasked by Simpson himself to conduct a refresher course for all infantry and artillery commanders in the Ninth United States Army, down to the battalion level. Harrison lectured the tactics employed by his command in the taking of several towns and then took the entire class to the field to Sankt Jöris near Aachen, where artillery and tanks were set up to demonstrate how they had been used in the attack there.

Harrison and 30th Division returned to the front lines following the launch of the massive German offensive in the Ardennes on December 17, 1944, and participated in combat in the Malmedy-Stavelot area. Hobbs tasked Harrison with the command of the task force, consisting of the 119th Infantry Regiment, which later repelled a German assault at La Gleize. Harrison and his task force destroyed or captured 178 enemy armored vehicles, including 39 tanks.

He was out of action during January 1945, when he suffered an infection requiring surgery. Following his return at the beginning of February 1945, Harrison was visited by General William H. Simpson, the commanding general of the Ninth United States Army, who presented him with the Army Distinguished Service Medal for his previous service with the War Plans Division, War Department General Staff, where he proposed a new concept of organization.

During March 1945, the 30th Division was located in the rear for rest and refit and conducted training for its next deployment. Harrison took part in the crossing of Rhine River on March 23, and advanced further into Germany. After taking Hamelin and Braunschweig at the beginning of April 1945, the 30th Division Task Force under Harrison's command discovered two large groups of Hungarian Jewish women at Teutoburg Forest.

On April 13, 1945, Harrison participated in the efforts to save 2,400 prisoners from the Neuengamme concentration camp subcamp at Farsleben, whom they found locked in train boxcars. The 30th Division then proceeded eastward and halted its advance on the Elbe River at Grunewald linking up with Soviet forces.

For his service with the 30th Infantry Division, Harrison received the Legion of Merit and two Bronze Star Medals. The Allies bestowed him with several decorations including: the Legion of Honour, the Croix de Guerre with Palm by France, the Distinguished Service Order by Great Britain, the Order of Orange-Nassau by the Netherlands and the Order of the Red Banner by the Soviet Union.

== Postwar service ==
Harrison then participated in the occupation duty in Germany in Magdeburg until June 1945, when he was appointed the acting commanding general of the 2nd Infantry Division located between Prague and Pilsen, Czechoslovakia. He returned to the United States by the end of July and commanded the Second Division during the preparations for combat deployment to the Pacific area.

He was relieved by Major General Edward M. Almond in September 1945 and assumed duty as his assistant division commander. Due to the surrender of Japan, the deployment to the Pacific was canceled and Harrison served with the 2nd Division at Camp Swift, Texas until April 1946. Harrison was then appointed commanding general at Camp Carson, Colorado, where he was responsible for the demobilization of troops returning from war zones in Europe and Pacific.

In November 1946, Harrison was reverted to his permanent rank of colonel and ordered to Japan, where he was attached to the General Headquarters of the Supreme Commander for the Allied Powers under General Douglas MacArthur as Executive for Administrative Affairs and Reparations. While in this capacity, he collaborated closely with MacArthur and was responsible for the restoration of the Japanese economy as rapidly as possible.

He remained in this capacity until January 1947, when he was appointed commanding officer of the General Headquarters, Supreme Commander for the Allied Powers and also held additional duty as the executive officer of the Far East Command.

Harrison was promoted again to brigadier general on January 24, 1948, and appointed Chief of the Reparations Section at the headquarters of the Supreme Commander for the Allied Powers and held this assignment until December 1948, when he was ordered back to the United States.

He was subsequently appointed Chief of the Armed Forces Information and Education Division of the Department of the Army in Washington, D.C. and was promoted to major general on March 11, 1949. While in this capacity, Harrison was responsible for the propaganda and university extension courses. He did not like that job and following the outbreak of the Korean War, he applied to be assigned to a field command, hoping that the Army Chief of Personnel, Matthew B. Ridgway, who was his friend and West Point classmate, would help him.

Unfortunately, Ridgway could not help him at the time and offered him a post as the commanding general of Fort Dix, New Jersey with additional duty as the commanding general of the 9th Infantry Division. Harrison accepted the offer in September 1950 and was responsible for the training of replacements for troops both in Europe and South Korea. During sixteen-week training cycles, he had to transform young men into effective soldiers, but his methods were not met with understanding by some of the recruits' parents and also with some unfavorable press.

The night marches and forced 16 miles (26 km) marches with packs caused complaints to Congressmen. When the father of one recruit was invited to spend a week at the barracks with his son, he changed his mind and upon returning home, he wrote a second letter to the editor of the newspaper, withdrawing all his criticism.

Harrison also ordered total racial integration of living accommodations at Fort Dix. It should be mentioned that he was no racist, but neither was he a civil rights activist. He did that because he needed his barracks to run in a more efficient manner. The barracks for white recruits were overcrowded and the ones for African Americans were half empty. The training was also racially integrated by Harrison.

== Korean War ==
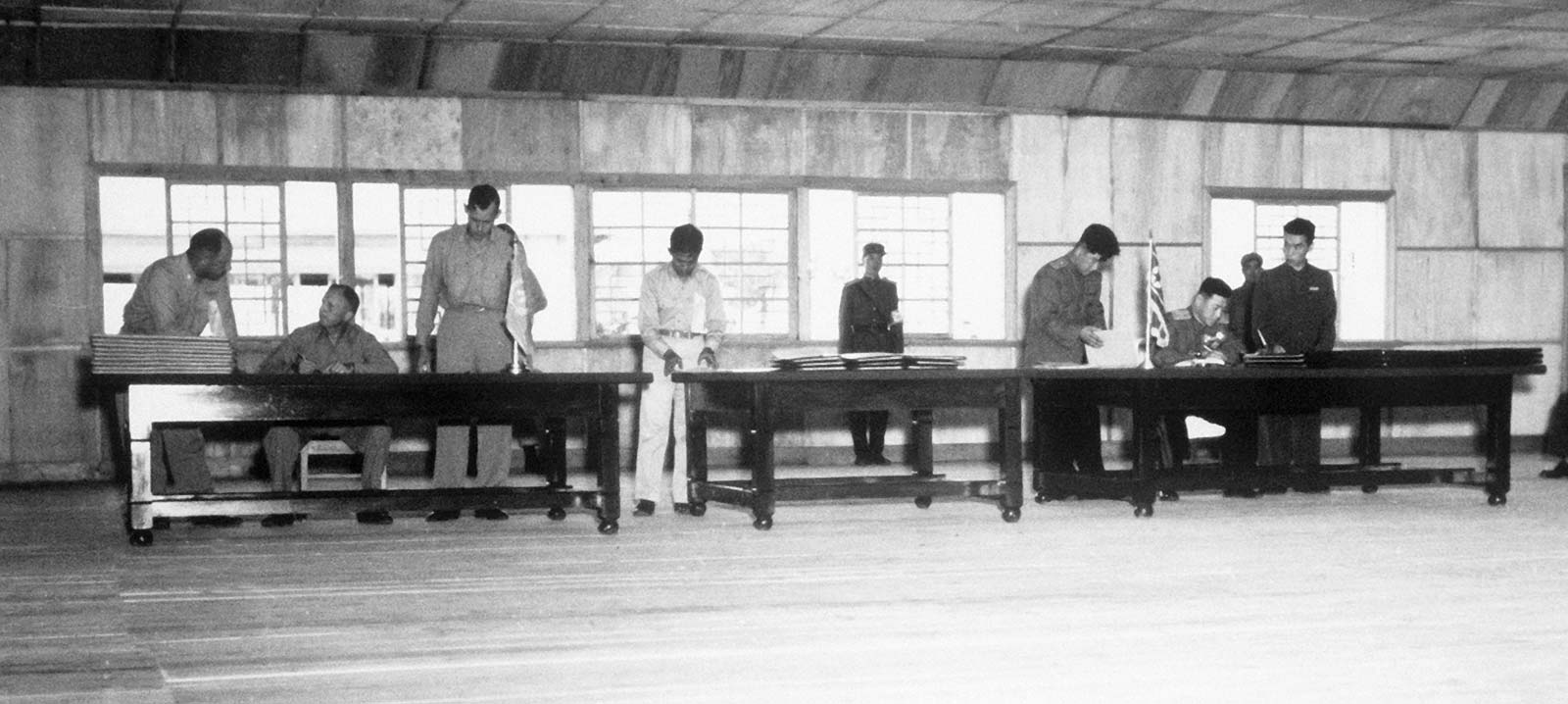
UN delegate Lieut. Gen. William K. Harrison Jr. (seated left), and Korean People's Army and Chinese People's Volunteers delegate Gen. Nam Il (seated right) signing the Korean War armistice agreement at P'anmunjŏm, Korea, July 27, 1953.

Harrison was finally ordered to South Korea in December 1951 and appointed deputy commander of the Eighth United States Army under General James Van Fleet, whom he respected as a combat troop leader. After reporting to Van Fleet, Harrison inspected every 8th Army combat division located on the Jamestown Line (including American, British Commonwealth, South Korean and United Nations Command troops) from the Yellow Sea to the Sea of Japan.

He gained awareness of the situation on the front, terrain and enemy positions, but there were no major military operations, just a stalemate. The North Koreans and U.N. troops were located on the Jamestown Line and truce talks between United Nations and North Korea were already in effect. However Ridgway was not satisfied with one member of the U.N. negotiation team, Major General Claude B. Ferenbaugh and replaced him with Harrison in January 1952.

Harrison was attached to the U.S. team under Vice Admiral C. Turner Joy and participated in the regular negotiations with North Korean and Chinese representatives at Panmunjom. The negotiations were ineffective and the North Korean and Chinese used the truce talks just for propaganda purposes and to strengthen their positions on the Jamestown Line. Joy was planning his own departure in mid-1952 and recommended Harrison as his replacement. Harrison became the delegation chairman and his place as a member was taken by Frank C. McConnell.

Ridgway agreed and announced the change of command to Washington, where it was confirmed in May 1952, when Harrison was appointed senior member of the Korean Armistice Delegation. He also nominated Harrison for the temporary rank of lieutenant general, but Armed Service Committee rejected the promotion.

In May 1952, General Mark W. Clark, another West Point classmate and friend of Harrison, succeeded Ridgway as Commander-in-Chief, United Nations Command Korea and urged Harrison's promotion again. The Army Chief of Staff, General J. Lawton Collins, who was also a West Point classmate of Harrison, convinced the committee and Harrison was promoted to the rank of lieutenant general on September 8, 1952.

Clark later commented:

I know that Billy wanted a field command. He's an old cavalry man, and the cavalry's always looking for a charge. But I knew we needed someone with the strength of character to look the Communists in the eye and say, 'Bull!' Not that Billy Harrison would ever say it quite that way, but the Reds would get his message.

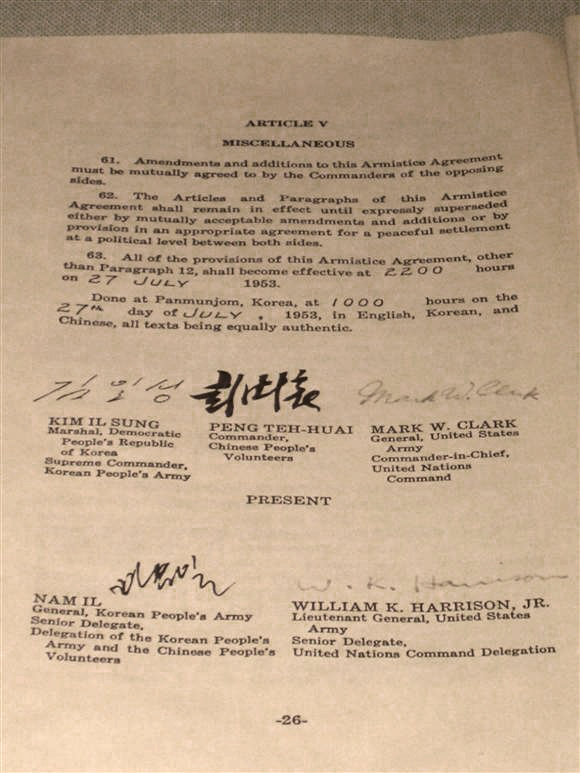
The English text of Korean Armistice Agreement. Harrison's signature is in the lower left corner.

Following the promotion, Harrison was appointed the deputy commanding general and chief of staff of the Far East Command under Clark and retained his assignment as the senior member in the truce talks team. He participated in the regular meetings with North Korean delegation led by General Nam Il and had to handle more North Korean attempts to use the truce talks as a platform for propaganda. He despised the communists, who he regarded with contempt as common criminals and for example in June 1952, he left the truce meeting, when he saw that the negotiation was without result, leaving North Korean General Nam Il flabbergasted.

In September 1953, Harrison assumed duties as the deputy commanding general and chief of staff of the Far East Command under Clark and remained in that capacity under General John E. Hull, who replaced Clark in October 1953. Harrison served in the Far East until May 1954, when he returned to the United States for a new assignment. For his service in Korea during the armistice negotiations and later with the Far East Forces, he was decorated with the Navy Distinguished Service Medal. Queen Elizabeth awarded him the Companion of the Most Honorable Order of the Bath.

A 1952 report prepared in Pyongyang by the non-governmental and historically Communist-affiliated International Association of Democratic Lawyers claimed that Harrison had overseen the Sinchon Massacre, an alleged massacre of civilians which North Korea claims was perpetrated by the US and South Korea. The report claimed that a General "Harrison" had personally carried out atrocities and photographed them. Harrison was reportedly shocked by the claim. Investigative reports have concluded there was no Harrison in Sinchon at the time, and that this was either a pseudonym of someone else or a false claim.

== Later service ==
Upon his return stateside, Harrison was welcomed as a hero, who brought peace in Korea. He attended many parades and banquets, where he featured as speaker and was given honorary degrees from Wheaton College in Illinois and Houghton College in New York. Harrison was also featured as speaker at the Easter sunrise service at the famous Rose Bowl stadium in Pasadena, California.

He then arrived at the Panama Canal Zone on June 16, 1954, and assumed duties as the commander-in-chief of the United States Caribbean Command with headquarters in Quarry Heights. His main task was the defense of the Panama Canal and its coast, which was divided into Atlantic and Pacific Sectors. Harrison arrived in a country with an unstable political situation, because a few months after his arrival, the President of Panama, José Antonio Remón Cantera was assassinated and his successor, José Ramón Guizado, was arrested for conspiracy and murder.

Harrison participated in many ceremonies including the Inauguration of President Ernesto de la Guardia in October 1956 (as a member of the United States delegation). He also hosted President Dwight D. Eisenhower and then-Vice President Richard Nixon in 1955.

He instituted military training exercises, both amphibious and paratroop, in the Canal Zone and forces came from the United States. Harrison intended to demonstrate to Panama's neighbors the capabilities of the United States Army. Harrison was succeeded by Lieutenant General Robert M. Montague at the end of January 1957 and returned to the United States, awaiting retirement. For his service in that capacity, Harrison was decorated by Brazil, Panama, Chile and Peru.

== Retirement ==
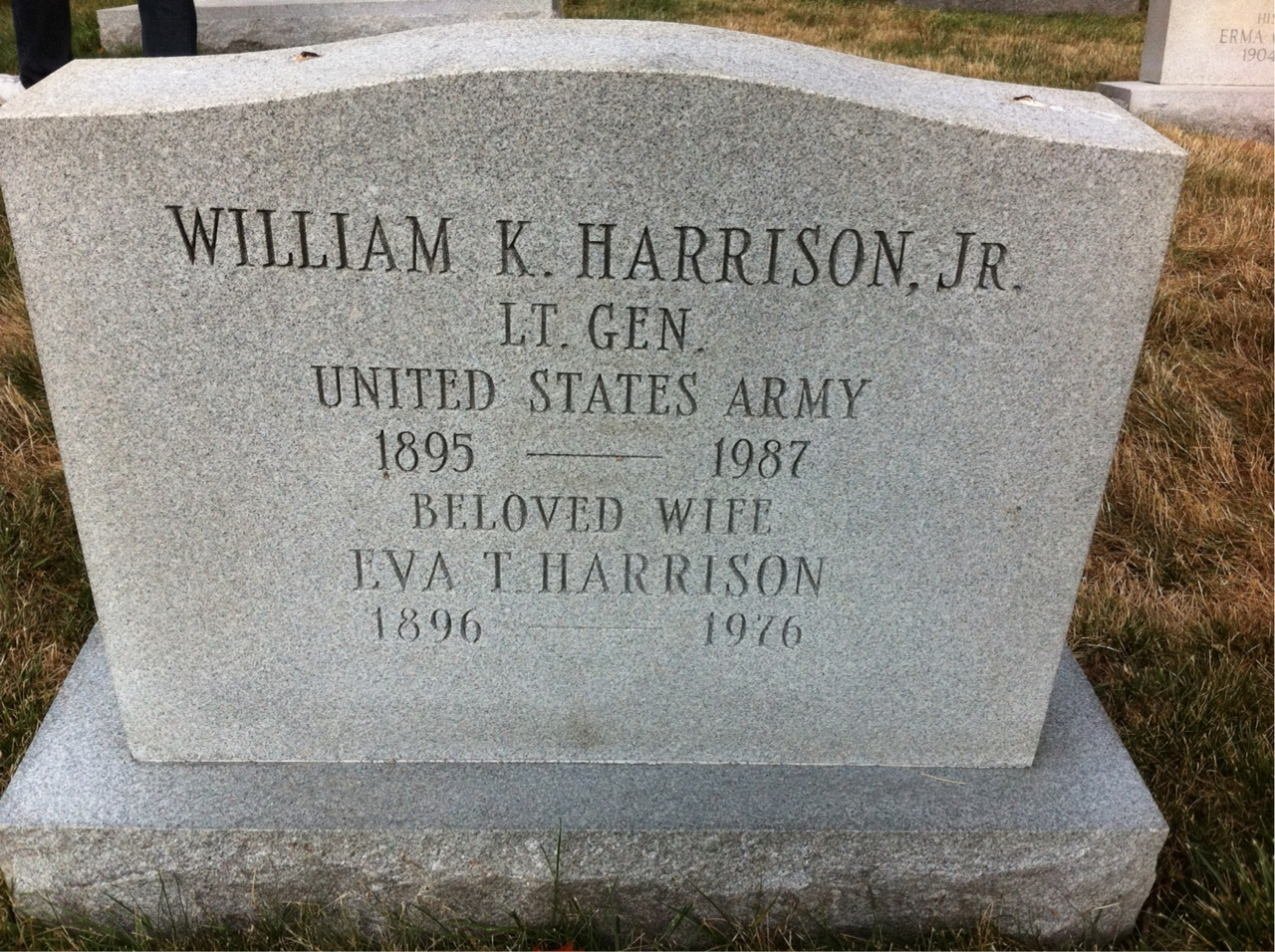
Harrison's grave at Arlington National Cemetery.

Harrison retired from the Army on February 28, 1957, after almost 40 years of service and settled in Chicago, where he served as executive director of the Evangelical Child Welfare Agency until 1960. Harrison served as president of the Officers' Christian Fellowship from 1954 to 1972 and as president emeritus from 1972 until his death. He was also a member of the Lownes Free Church and the Alumni Association of the United States Military Academy and as a trustee of The Stony Brook School in Stony Brook, New York.

Harrison died on May 25, 1987, in Bryn Mawr Terrace, a nursing home in Bryn Mawr, Pennsylvania, aged 91. He was buried with full military honors at Arlington National Cemetery, Virginia.

== Decorations ==
Here is Lieutenant General Harrison's ribbon bar:

1st Row	Distinguished Service Cross		Army Distinguished Service Medal		
2nd Row	Navy Distinguished Service Medal	Silver Star	Legion of Merit	Bronze Star Medal with Oak Leaf Cluster	Fourragère
3rd Row	Purple Heart	World War I Victory Medal	American Defense Service Medal	American Campaign Medal	Fourragère
4th Row	European-African-Middle Eastern Campaign Medal with five 3/16 inch service stars	World War II Victory Medal	Army of Occupation Medal	National Defense Service Medal	Fourragère
5th Row	Korean Service Medal with three 3/16 inch service stars	Companion of the Order of the Bath (United Kingdom)	Distinguished Service Order (United Kingdom)	Knight of the Legion of Honor (France)	Fourragère
6th Row	French Croix de guerre 1939-1945 with Palm	Dutch Order of Orange-Nassau, Officer	Order of the Red Banner (Union of Soviet Socialist Republics)	United Nations Korea Medal	Fourragère
7th Row	Brazilian Order of Military Merit, Grade of Commander	Chilean Order of Merit, Grade of Grand Officer	Panamanian Order of Vasco Núñez de Balboa, Grade of Grand Officer	Peruvian Military Order of Ayacucho, Grade of Grand Officer	

== Notes ==
Military offices
Preceded by Horace L. McBride	C-in-C United States States Caribbean Command; June 1954 – January 1957	Succeeded by Robert M. Montague
Preceded by John M. Devine	Commanding General 9th Infantry Division; September 1950 – February 1952	Succeeded by Roderick R. Allen
Preceded by Walter M. Robertson	Commanding General 2nd Infantry Division; June 1945 – September 1945	Succeeded by Edward Almond
