= List of military officers who have led divisions of a civil service =

The following is a list of military officers who have led divisions of a civil service.

== Canada ==
=== Department of National Defence ===
- Brigadier-General (Ret) Gordon O'Connor, Minister of National Defence, 2006–August 2007

=== Canada Revenue Agency ===
Brigadier-General (Ret) Gordon O'Connor, Minister of National Revenue 2007-

== United States ==
A serving military officer, without special authorization, cannot be Secretary of State or Defense. Special circumstances existed for George Marshall, as a five-star General of the Army (GOA). Five-star ranks, which have not been used since shortly after World War II, technically never retire. The National Security Act of 1947 allows either the Director or Vice Director of Central Intelligence to be a serving officer, but not both.

=== Central Intelligence Agency ===
- RADM Sidney Souers, Director of Central Intelligence, 1946
- LTG Hoyt S. Vandenberg, US Army, Director of Central Intelligence, 1946–1947
- RADM Roscoe H. Hillenkoetter, Director of Central Intelligence, 1947–1950
- GEN Walter Bedell Smith, US Army, Director of Central Intelligence, 1950–1953
- VADM William Raborn, Director of Central Intelligence, 1965–1966
- ADM Stansfield Turner, Director of Central Intelligence, 1977–1981
- GEN Michael Hayden, US Air Force, Director of the Central Intelligence Agency, 2006–2009

=== Department of State ===
- GOA George Marshall, Secretary of State, 1947–1949
- GEN Colin Powell, US Army (Ret) Secretary of State, 2001–2005

=== Department of Defense ===
- GOA George Marshall, Secretary of Defense, 1950–1951

== See also ==
- Civil service
- Military officer
