= Miles Christi (religious order) =

Religious order in the Catholic Church

- Formation: December 20, 1994
- Founded at: Argentina
- Type: Clerical Religious Order
- Affiliations: Catholic Church
- Website: https://www.mileschristi.org/

Miles Christi ('Soldier of Christ', postnominal MC) is a clerical religious order in the Catholic Church founded in the Archdiocese of La Plata, Argentina. Miles Christi was founded by Roberto Juan Yannuzzi and focused on the spirituality of Saint Ignatius of Loyola and retreats, conferences, catechism, and spiritual direction. On February 19, 2025, the Dicastery for Institutes of Consecrated Life and Societies of Apostolic Life decreed the suppression of Miles Christi with the approval of Pope Francis on February 6, which "begins a one-year process, at the end of which the Dicastery will declare the effective suppression."

== Foundation ==
The order was formally established as a Public Clerical Association of the Faithful in the Archdiocese of La Plata, Argentina on 20 December 1994. On 11 February 1999, Miles Christi was elevated to the status of Clerical Religious Order. In 2000, Miles Christi arrived in South Lyon, Michigan, by invitation of Cardinal Adam Maida. They then arrived in San Diego, California, and in 2022 they founded their third American house in Denver, Colorado. On 21 November 2020, the first US-born Miles Christi priest was ordained by Archbishop Allen Vigneron at Sweetest Heart of Mary Church in Detroit, Michigan.

After years of investigations against the founder Roberto Juan Yannuzzi, the Vatican ordered that he be laicized after being found guilty of canonical crimes in connection to sexual abuse. The decision was made on 19 February 2025 by the Dicastery for Institutes of Consecrated Life and Societies of Apostolic Life.

== Announcement of suppression ==
On March 6, 2025, the bishops conference of Argentina announced that the Vatican had ordered the suppression of the institute, a process intended to take a year. This followed the years-long investigation into Yannuzzi. Notably, that investigation had in 2019 sent materials from the La Plata archdiocese to the Dicastery for the Doctrine of the Faith, at which time the archbishop of La Plata was Víctor Fernández, who in 2023 was appointed prefect of the Dicastery.
