= Soldiers of Christ, Arise =

Christian hymn written by Charles Wesley

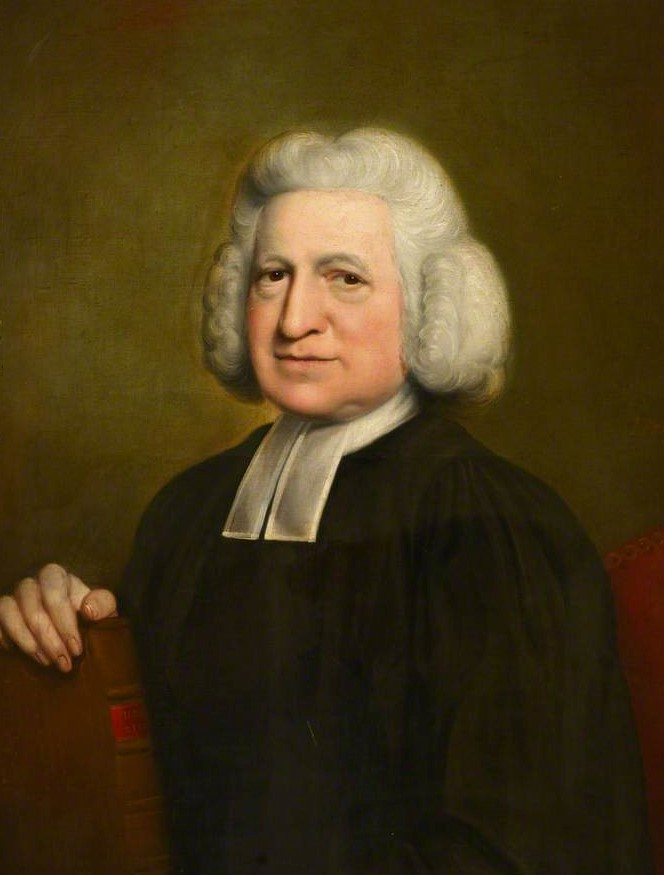
- Charles Wesley
- Genre: Hymn
- Written: 1749
- Text: Charles Wesley
- Based on: Ephesians 6:10-18
- Meter: 6.6.8.6
- Melody: "Diademata" by George Job Elvey; "From Strength to Strength" by Edward Woodall Naylor

"Soldiers of Christ, Arise" is an 18th-century English hymn. The words were written by Charles Wesley (1707–1788), and the first line ("Soldiers of Christ, arise, and put your armour on") refers to the armour of God in Ephesians 6:10–18.

== History ==
Wesley initially wrote the hymn as a poem titled "The Whole Armour of God, Ephesians VI" in 1747 and was used to defend against criticism of Methodism within Great Britain. During their evangelical careers, both Charles Wesley and his brother John Wesley received physical abuse because of them. As a result, this hymn was written and also became known as "The Christian's bugle blast" because of the military references and the apparent call to arms when it was set to music. The hymn was published as "Soldiers of Christ, Arise" in 1749 in "Hymns and Sacred Poems" with 16 verses of 8 lines. In 1780, it was published as a hymn in John Wesley's "A Collection of Hymns for the Use of the People Called Methodists" with 12 verses. Since 1847, the hymn is usually only performed with 3 verses; the most recent British Methodist hymn book, "Singing the Faith", some of the additional verses are included as a separate hymn with the first line "Pray without ceasing, pray"; this was common practice in 19th century hymnals

In the hymn, the words "adamant and gold" are used. This is speculated to be Wesley making reference to John Milton's poem, Paradise Lost where it says "Satan, with vast and haughty strides advanced, Came towering, armed in adamant and gold." This suggests that Wesley intended for the hymn to be for Christians to use Satan's ways against him.

== Usage ==
Wesley wrote a unique piece of music entitled "Soldiers of Christ" for the hymn to be set to. However the hymn has been set to other tunes as well. One of several tunes for the hymn is by William P. Merrill (1867–1954). However, in the United States the main alternative piece of music that is used for the hymn is "Diademata" by George Job Elvey. This music has become more associated with "Soldiers of Christ, Arise" than the original "Soldiers of Christ" music, or any other single tune. The hymn is played using Diademata after first being published in the Anglican hymnal, Hymns Ancient and Modern, It is also played with Diademata in the Seventh-day Adventist Church hymnal and the hymn appeared in the Manchester Hymnal. In British Methodism, however, the hymn is usually sung to a tune named "From Strength to Strength", composed by Edward Woodall Naylor; this is the tune set in all official British Methodist hymn books since at least 1933.

In the United Methodist Church hymnal, "Soldiers of Christ, Arise" is the only hymn included that was originally in John Wesley's A Collection of Hymns for the Use of the People Called Methodists. It is one of only a few Methodist hymns that overtly referred to battles or the notion of Christians as soldiers.

== Hymn ==
Soldiers of Christ, Arise, and put your armour on,
Strong in the strength which God supplies through His eternal Son.
Strong in the Lord of hosts, and in His Mighty Power,
Who in the strength of Jesus is more than conqueror.

Send then in His great might, with all His strength endued,
But take, to arm you for the fight, the panoply of God;
That, having all things done, and all your conflicts passed,
Ye may o'ercome through Christ alone and stand entire at last.

Stand then against your foes, in close and firm array;
Legions of wily fiends oppose throughout the evil day.
But meet the sons of night, and mock their vain design,
Armed in the arms of heavenly light, of righteousness divine.

Leave no unguarded place, no weakness of the soul,
Take every virtue, every grace, and fortify the whole;
Indissolubly joined, to battle all proceed;
But arm yourselves with all the mind that was in Christ, your head.

(bar verses)

== See also ==
- New Testament military metaphors
- "Onward, Christian Soldiers"
