= New Testament military metaphors =

Christian concepts expressed through military images

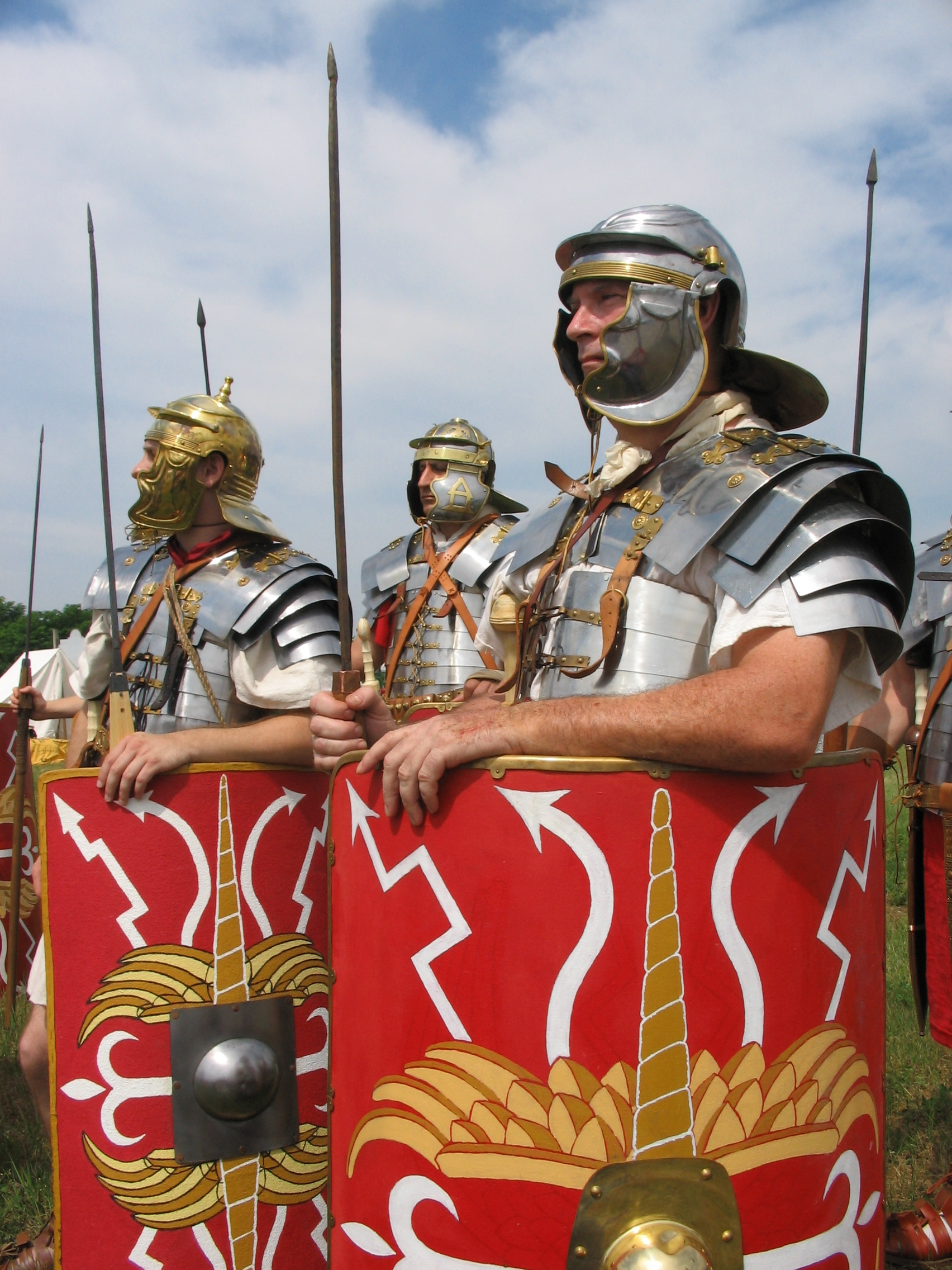
New Testament military metaphors refer particularly to the legionaries of the 1st century Imperial Roman army.

The New Testament uses a number of military metaphors in discussing Christianity, especially in the Pauline epistles.

In Philippians 2:25 and Philemon 1:2, Paul describes fellow Christians as "fellow soldiers" (in Greek, συστρατιώτῃ, sustratiōtē). The image of a soldier is also used in 2 Timothy 2:3–4 as a metaphor for courage, loyalty and dedication; this is followed by the metaphor of an athlete, emphasising hard work. In 1 Corinthians 9:7, this image is used in a discussion of church workers receiving payment, with a metaphorical reference to a soldier's rations and expenses.

Ephesians 6:10–18 discusses faith, righteousness, and other elements of Christianity as the armour of God, and this imagery is replicated by John Bunyan in The Pilgrim's Progress, and by many other Christian writers.

Related imagery appears in hymns such as "Soldiers of Christ, Arise" and "Onward, Christian Soldiers".

== See also ==
- But to bring a sword
- Christian soldier
- Christians in the military
- Church militant and church triumphant
- Miles Christianus
- Military chaplain
- Military order (religious society)
- Muscular Christianity
- New Testament athletic metaphors
- Prayer warrior
- Salvation Army
- Spiritual warfare
