= Lloyd George Knew My Father (song) =

English folk song

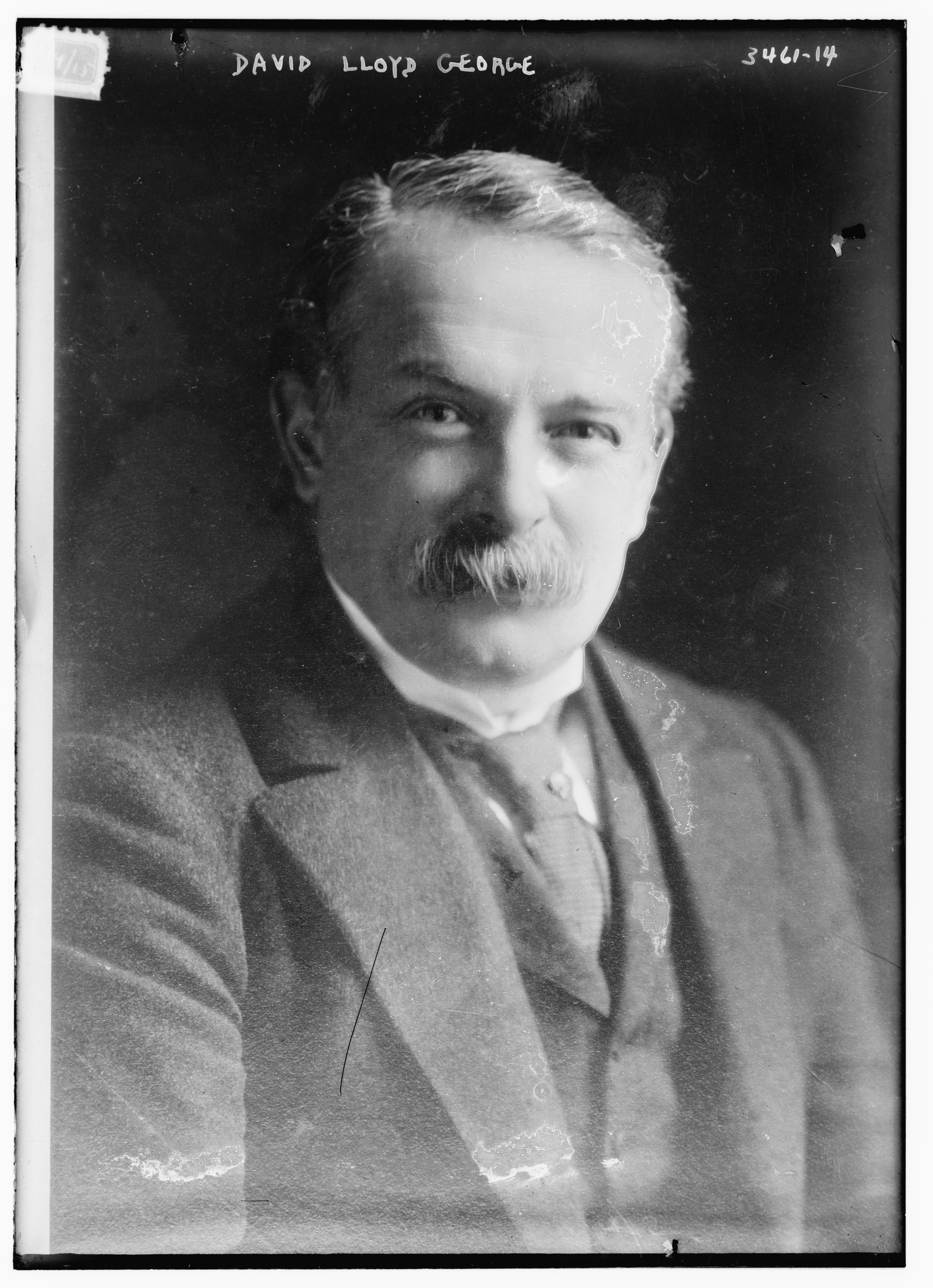
David Lloyd George (1863-1945) who served as Prime Minister of the United Kingdom from 1916 to 1922

"Lloyd George Knew My Father" is a 20th-century English schoolboy folk song. The simple lyrics consist of the phrase "Lloyd George knew my father/Father knew Lloyd George" sung to the tune of "Onward, Christian Soldiers". In the song, the two lines referring to Lloyd George (LG) are repeated until boredom sets in. There are no lyrics other than the two lines.

The origin of the song is not known but there are several theories, one that it began as a music hall song making an oblique reference to David Lloyd George's supposed womanizing proclivities and rumours of adultery with the neglected wives of his benefactors and acquaintances (with the right timing and intonation and a well-placed wink, "father" could be taken to mean "mother", and "knew" in the biblical sense of sexual relations; thus the singer might even have been fathered by LG, "the Goat"). The Oxford Dictionary of Political Quotations attributes the song to Tommy Rhys Roberts QC, the son of a former law partner of Lloyd George, who knew him. According to David Owen, it was a World War I marching song. The lyrics also went : Lloyd George knew my father, my father knew Lloyd George, Now they sit together in the House of Lords” as a satire over the sale of peerages.

== Notes ==
1. Arthur Sullivan's version of the tune. Sabine Baring-Gould had written the hymn in 1865 but had used a theme from the andante movement of Joseph Haydn's Symphony 53 in D major as the music. Sullivan composed a new tune (which he named "Saint Gertrude") in 1871 to go with Baring-Gould's lyrics, and it is this version which is commonly used since.
