= Prayer warrior =

People who see themselves as engaged in spiritual warfare through prayer

Prayer warrior is a term used by many evangelical and other Christians to refer to anyone who is committed to praying for others.

== Overview ==
Within the context of dominion theology, prayer warriors see themselves as engaged in spiritual warfare against satanic forces.

Prayer warriors may pray for individuals, or for entire states or regions. One recent development has been prayer undertaken by groups of people flying over the areas for which they wish to undertake intercession.

While not all prayer warriors are evangelical Christians, some are. During the Iraq War, one aspect of the debate over U.S. involvement was a "prayer battle," with one side praying in support of the policies of the Bush administration and the other taking an anti-war stance. Alabama Governor Bob Riley urged his constituents to act as prayer warriors, and Georgia Governor Sonny Perdue designated a three-day prayer weekend that he cast as a spiritual battle. Although most "prayer warriors for peace" were identified as Christians, Muslims in the U.S. and Indonesia were also said to have taken part.

Sarah Palin, the vice-presidential candidate for the Republican Party in the 2008 U.S. presidential elections, regularly acknowledged the support of prayer warriors in her speeches and interviews, and has spoken of them as offering a "prayer shield." As a candidate, she thanked prayer warriors for their support and spoke of divine intervention in the election as a result.

== See also ==
- New Testament military metaphors
- Battle meditation, a similar concept in Star Wars lore
