= Onward, Christian Soldiers =

19th-century English hymn

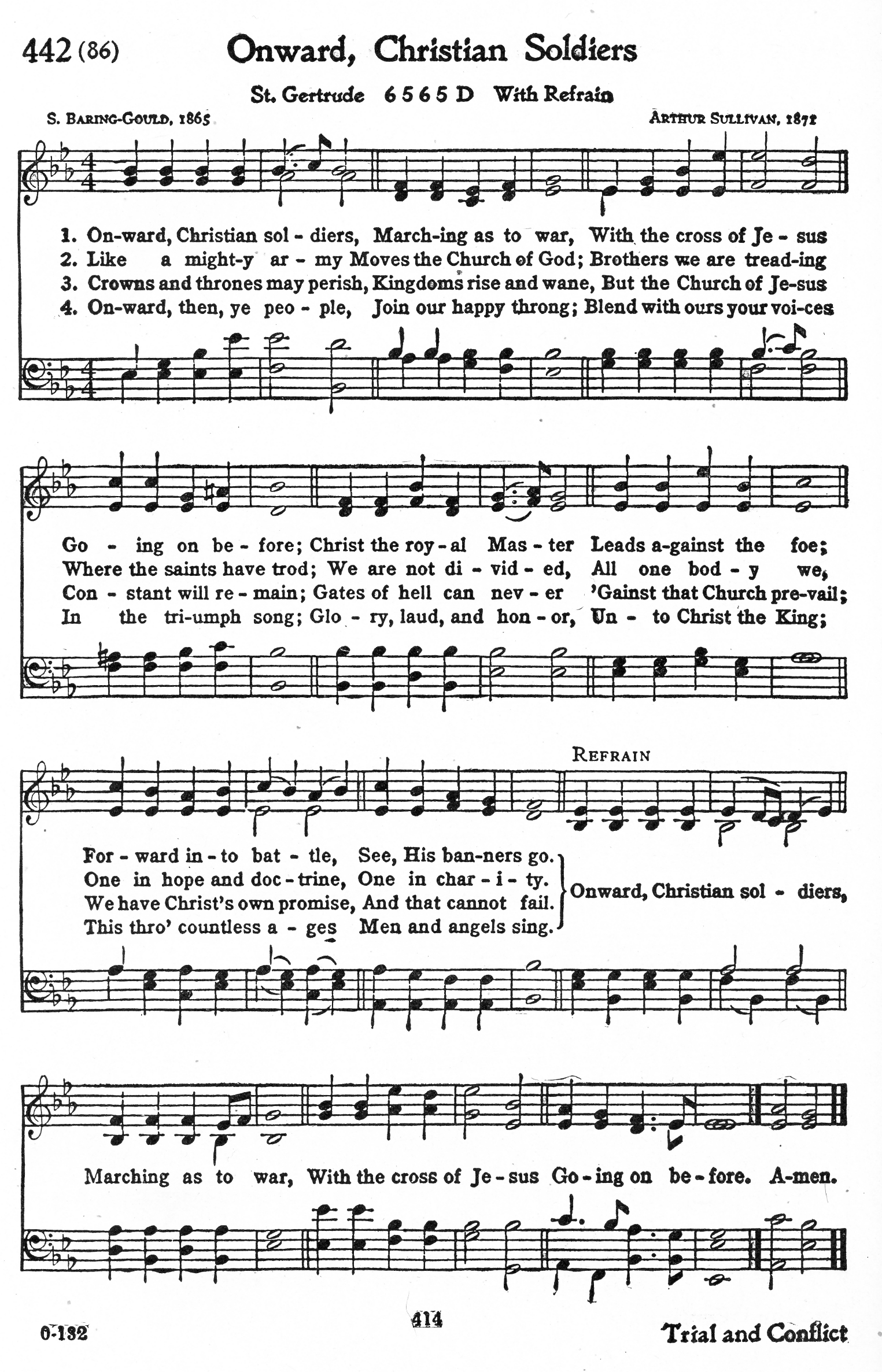
- Sheet music from The Hymnal Army and Navy
- Genre: Hymn
- Written: 1871
- Text: Sabine Baring-Gould
- Based on: 2 Timothy 2:3
- Melody: "St Gertrude" by Arthur Sullivan

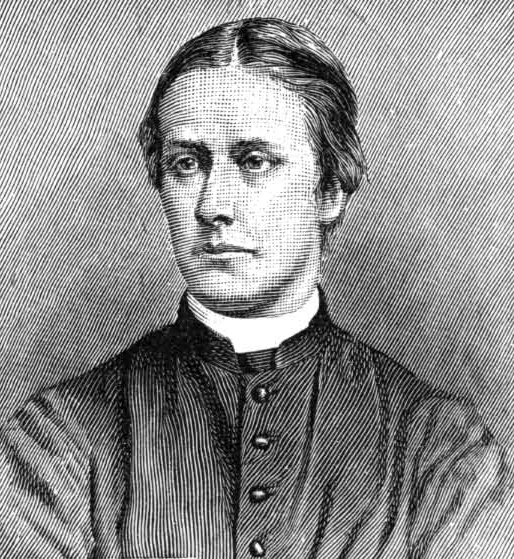
Sabine Baring-Gould, 1869

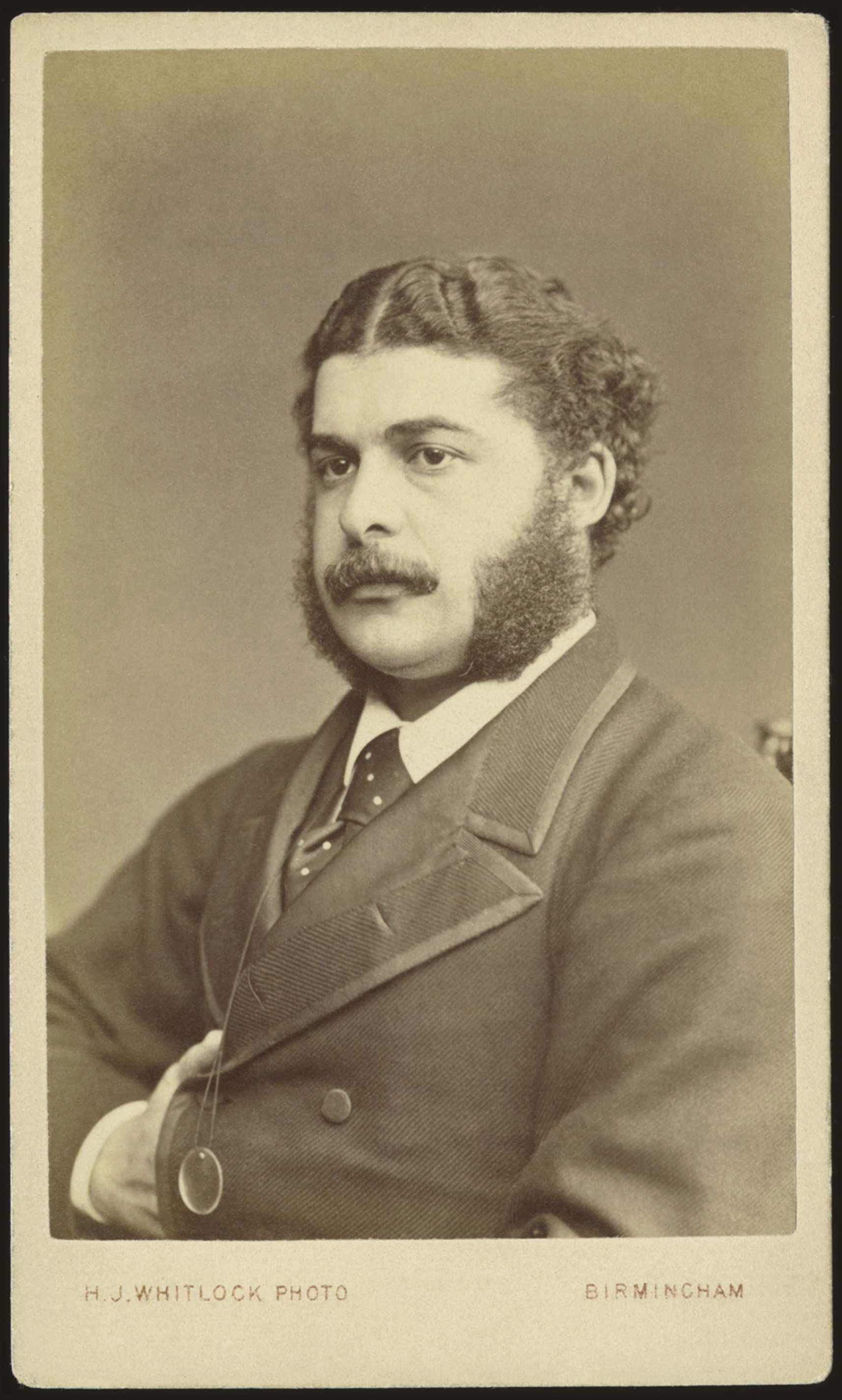
Arthur Sullivan, c. 1870

"Onward, Christian Soldiers" is a 19th-century English hymn. The words were written by Sabine Baring-Gould in 1865, and the music was composed by Arthur Sullivan in 1871. Sullivan named the tune "St Gertrude", after the wife of his friend Ernest Clay Ker Seymer, at whose country home he composed the tune. The Salvation Army adopted the hymn as its favoured processional. The piece became Sullivan's most popular hymn. The hymn's theme is taken from references in the New Testament to the Christian being a soldier for Christ, for example 2 Timothy 2:3 (KJV): "Thou therefore endure hardness, as a good soldier of Jesus Christ."

== Early history ==
The lyric was written as a processional hymn for children walking from Horbury Bridge, where Baring-Gould was curate, to Horbury St Peter's Church near Wakefield, Yorkshire, at Whitsuntide in 1865. It was originally entitled, "Hymn for Procession with Cross and Banners". According to the Centre for Church Music, Baring-Gould reportedly wrote "Onward, Christian Soldiers" in about 15 minutes, later apologising, "It was written in great haste, and I am afraid that some of the lines are faulty." He later allowed hymn-book compilers to alter the lyrics. For example, The Fellowship Hymn Book, with his permission, changed the phrase "one in hope and doctrine" to "one in hope and purpose." For the 1909 edition of Hymns Ancient and Modern, he changed the fifth line of the same verse from "We are not divided" to "Though divisions harass." However, Baring-Gould's original words are used in most modern hymnals.

Baring-Gould originally set the lyrics to a melody from the slow movement of Joseph Haydn's Symphony in D, No. 15. This was printed in 1871 in an English church periodical, the Church Times. The hymn did not receive wide acceptance, however, until Sullivan wrote the tune "St. Gertrude" for it. Sullivan quoted the tune in his Boer War Te Deum, first performed in 1902, after his death. Another hymn sung to the St. Gertrude tune is "Forward Through the Ages", written by Frederick Lucian Hosmer (1840–1929) in 1908.

== Later history ==
In the 1912 Progressive National Convention, which nominated Theodore Roosevelt for president in the 1912 United States presidential election, the song was adopted by the delegates as their anthem, and Roosevelt said that his Progressive Party was going to "battle for the Lord".

When Winston Churchill and Franklin Roosevelt met in August 1941 on the battleship HMS Prince of Wales to agree the Atlantic Charter, a church service was held for which Prime Minister Churchill chose the hymns. He chose "Onward, Christian Soldiers" and afterwards made a radio broadcast explaining this choice:

We sang "Onward, Christian Soldiers" indeed, and I felt that this was no vain presumption, but that we had the right to feel that we were serving a cause for the sake of which a trumpet has sounded from on high. When I looked upon that densely packed congregation of fighting men of the same language, of the same faith, of the same fundamental laws, of the same ideals ... it swept across me that here was the only hope, but also the sure hope, of saving the world from measureless degradation.

The song was sung at the funeral of American president Dwight D. Eisenhower at the National Cathedral in Washington, D.C., in March 1969. Apart from its obvious martial associations, the song has been associated with protest against the established order, particularly in the case of the civil rights movement.

An attempt was made in the 1980s to strip "Onward, Christian Soldiers" from the United Methodist Hymnal and the Episcopal Hymnal 1982 due to perceived militarism. Outrage among church-goers caused both committees to back down. However, the hymn was omitted from both the 1990 and 2013 hymnals of the Presbyterian Church (U.S.A.), the Australian Hymn Book, published in 1977, its successor, Together in Song, (1999) and the Evangelical Lutheran Church in America's 2006 hymnal. The Spiritualists' National Union hymnbook has a variation on the hymn, entitled "Onward, Comrades, Onward". In some modern Anglican hymn books, it is replaced with Onward, Christian Pilgrims set to the same tune.

== In popular culture ==
Largely because of its association with missionaries of various types, the song is sung in a number of movies and television programmes. The 1939 film, Stanley and Livingstone, depicts David Livingstone (played by Sir Cedric Hardwicke) spiritedly leading a choir of African people in this anthem. The piece appears in several other films, including Major Barbara, Mrs. Miniver, Elmer Gantry, A Canterbury Tale, The Russians Are Coming, the Russians Are Coming, M*A*S*H, Taps, Reds, Striptease, The Bushbaby, The Ruling Class, Walker, Androcles and the Lion, Flyboys and First Reformed, It is also sung or played in episodes of TV series, including Little House on the Prairie, Boardwalk Empire, The Simpsons, The Ren & Stimpy Show, Little Britain, Upstairs, Downstairs, Lark Rise to Candleford and Dad's Army.

Onward Christian Soldiers is the title of a 1984 album and song by the British anarcho-punk band Icons of Filth. In the book Sins of the Assassin by Robert Ferrigno, the song is the national anthem of the fictional Bible Belt. In Christopher Webber's 1993 play Dr Sullivan and Mr Gilbert, the hymn is used with new words about Sullivan's rise to fame, and the artistic compromises that entailed.

"Christian Zeal and Activity", a 1973 work by American composer John Adams, is an arrangement of Sullivan's tune. The hymn's tune has also been used as the basis for many parodies, including Lloyd George Knew My Father and Like a mighty tortoise, / Moves the Church of God; / Brothers, we are treading / Where we've always trod.

== See also ==
- Christian soldier
- "Soldiers of Christ, Arise"
- Hymn § Christian hymnody
