= Horsham District Council elections =

Local government elections in West Sussex, England

Map of ward current ward boundaries

Horsham District Council in West Sussex, England, is elected every four years.

== Council elections ==
- 1973 Horsham District Council election
- 1976 Horsham District Council election
- 1979 Horsham District Council election (New ward boundaries)
- 1983 Horsham District Council election (District boundary changes took place but the number of seats remained the same)
- 1987 Horsham District Council election (District boundary changes took place but the number of seats remained the same)
- 1991 Horsham District Council election
- 1995 Horsham District Council election (District boundary changes took place but the number of seats remained the same)
- 1999 Horsham District Council election
- 2003 Horsham District Council election (New ward boundaries)
- 2007 Horsham District Council election
- 2011 Horsham District Council election
- 2015 Horsham District Council election (Some new ward boundaries)
- 2019 Horsham District Council election (New ward boundaries)
- 2023 Horsham District Council election

== Election results ==
	Overall control	Conservative	Lib Dems	Green	Lib/Alliance	RA	Independent
2023	LD	11	28	8	-	-	1
2019	Con	32	13	2	-	-	1
2015	Con	39	4	-	-	-	1
2011	Con	34	8	-	-	-	2
2007	Con	31	11	-	-	-	2
2003	NOC	22	20	-	-	-	2
1999	Con	21	12	-	-	-	3
1995	LD	17	24	-	-	-	2
1991	Con	28	13	-	-	-	2
1987	Con	33	-	-	6	-	4
1983	Con	35	-	-	2	-	5
1979	Con	33	-	-	1	1	8
1976	Con	30	-	-	-	1	12
1973	Ind	17	-	-	2	-	23

== Results maps ==
2003 results map

2007 results map

2011 results map

2015 results map

2019 results map

2023 results map

== By-elections ==
=== 2003-2007 ===
Roffey North By-Election, 10 June 2004
Party	Candidate	Votes	%	±%
Conservative	Simon Torn	887	39.5	+3.0
Liberal Democrats	David Wright	794	35.4	−9.2
Independent	Clive Burgess	322	14.3	+14.3
Labour	Jonathan Austin	242	10.8	+1.8
Majority		93	4.1	
Turnout		2,245		
Conservative gain from Liberal Democrats		Swing		

Bramber, Upper Beeding and Woodmancote By-Election, 2 December 2004
Party	Candidate	Votes	%	±%
Liberal Democrats	Andrew Purches	585	49.9	+3.9
Conservative	Ann Howland	547	46.6	+0.4
Labour	Estelle Hilditch	41	3.5	−4.3
Majority		38	3.2	
Turnout		1,173		
Liberal Democrats hold		Swing		

Henfield By-Election, 5 May 2005
Party	Candidate	Votes	%	±%
Conservative	Keith Wilkins	1,579	59.5	+21.5
Liberal Democrats	Frederick Taylor	1,076	40.5	+28.2
Majority		503	19.0	
Turnout		2,655		
Conservative hold		Swing		

Cowfold, Shermanbury and West Grinstead By-Election, 30 June 2005
Party	Candidate	Votes	%	±%
Conservative	Jonathan Chowen	742	74.6	+5.8
Liberal Democrats	Jennifer Pearce	253	25.4	+4.5
Majority		489	49.2	
Turnout		995		
Conservative hold		Swing		

Denne By-Election, 7 December 2006
Party	Candidate	Votes	%	±%
Liberal Democrats	Sheila Dale	550	40.8	−8.5
Conservative	Jacqueline Cox	456	33.8	−8.3
BNP	James Trower	171	12.7	+12.7
Independent	Antony Fletcher	78	5.8	+5.8
Labour	John Thomas	54	4.0	−4.6
UKIP	Stuart Aldridge	40	3.0	+3.0
Majority		94	7.0	
Turnout		1,349		
Liberal Democrats hold		Swing		

=== 2007-2011 ===
Holbrook West By-Election, 11 October 2007
Party	Candidate	Votes	%	±%
Liberal Democrats	Belinda Walters	602	43.9	+11.1
Conservative	Ronald Vimpany	554	40.4	−6.5
BNP	Donna Bailey	163	11.9	+11.9
Labour	Raymond Chapman	52	3.8	+0.2
Majority		48	3.5	
Turnout		1,371		
Liberal Democrats gain from Conservative		Swing		

Nuthurst By-Election, 4 June 2009
Party	Candidate	Votes	%	±%
Conservative	Duncan England	766	68.8	−4.6
Liberal Democrats	Peter Mullarkey	347	31.2	+12.9
Majority		419	37.6	
Turnout		1,113		
Conservative hold		Swing		

=== 2011-2015 ===
Itchingfield, Slinfold and Warnham By-Election, 16 February 2012
Party	Candidate	Votes	%	±%
Conservative	Stuart Ritchie	557	47.4	−4.4
Liberal Democrats	Ian Shepherd	320	27.2	+4.6
UKIP	George Tribe	173	14.7	+3.7
Green	Justin Pickard	65	5.5	−9.1
Labour	David Hide	60	5.1	+5.1
Majority		237	20.2	
Turnout		1,175		
Conservative hold		Swing		

Chantry By-Election, 2 May 2013
Party	Candidate	Votes	%	±%
Conservative	Diana van der Klugt	1,181	43.6	−10.9
UKIP	Peter Westrip	1,101	40.7	+27.8
Liberal Democrats	Rosalyn Deedman	426	15.7	−2.5
Majority		80	3.0	
Turnout		2,708		
Conservative hold		Swing		

Cowfold, Shermanbury and West Grinstead By-Election, 2 May 2013
Party	Candidate	Votes	%	±%
Conservative	Robert Clarke	873	78.2	+11.8
Liberal Democrats	Andrew Purches	243	21.8	−11.8
Majority		630	56.4	
Turnout		1,116		
Conservative hold		Swing		

=== 2015-2019 ===
Southwater By-Election, 10 November 2016
Party	Candidate	Votes	%	±%
Conservative	Billy Greening	1,046	66.2	+30.4
Liberal Democrats	Richard Greenwood	308	19.5	+2.4
Labour	Kevin O'Sullivan	118	7.5	−2.1
UKIP	Uri Baran	109	6.9	−8.3
Majority		738	46.7	
Turnout		1,581		
Conservative hold		Swing		

Cowfold, Shermanbury and West Grinstead By-Election, 24 May 2018
Party	Candidate	Votes	%	±%
Conservative	Lynn Lambert	661	68.4	−3.0
Labour	Kenneth Tyzack	158	16.3	+16.3
Liberal Democrats	David Perry	148	15.3	−13.3
Majority		503	52.0	
Turnout		967		
Conservative hold		Swing		

=== 2019-2023 ===
Storrington and Washington By-Election, 12 December 2019
Party	Candidate	Votes	%	±%
Conservative	James Wright	3,283	59.1	+7.8
Liberal Democrats	Alex Beveridge	1,344	24.2	−6.2
Labour	Jim Monaghan	924	16.6	−1.6
Majority		1,939	34.9	
Turnout		5,551		
Conservative hold		Swing		

Trafalgar By-Election, 6 May 2021
Party	Candidate	Votes	%	±%
Liberal Democrats	Martin Boffey	1,581	65.4	+10.6
Conservative	Aaron Courteney-Smith	529	21.9	−0.8
Labour	Joanne Kavanagh	307	12.7	−3.0
Majority		1,052	43.5	
Turnout		2,417		
Liberal Democrats hold		Swing		

Forest By-Election, 21 October 2021
Party	Candidate	Votes	%	±%
Liberal Democrats	Jon Olson	921	47.4	+7.9
Labour	David Hide	517	26.6	+4.2
Conservative	Ross Dye	410	21.1	−0.2
Green	Jon Campbell	97	5.0	+5.0
Majority		404	20.8	
Turnout		1,945		
Liberal Democrats hold		Swing		

Roffey South By-Election, 16 December 2021
Party	Candidate	Votes	%	±%
Liberal Democrats	Sam Raby	462	41.5	+0.6
Conservative	Simon Torn	335	30.1	−11.4
Green	Claire Adcock	222	19.9	+19.9
Labour	Daniel Everett	95	8.5	−9.2
Majority		127	11.4	
Turnout		1,114		
Liberal Democrats gain from Conservative		Swing		

Denne By-Election, 24 March 2022
Party	Candidate	Votes	%	±%
Liberal Democrats	Clive Trott	832	46.0	−5.0
Conservative	David Walbank	628	34.7	+0.2
Labour	Kevin O'Sullivan	241	13.3	−1.3
Green	Florian Yeates	107	5.9	+5.9
Majority		204	11.3	
Turnout		1,808		
Liberal Democrats hold		Swing		

Storrington and Washington By-Election, 7 April 2022
Party	Candidate	Votes	%	±%
Green	Joan Grech	1,281	47.9	+47.9
Conservative	Daniel Hall	943	35.2	−16.1
Liberal Democrats	Pascal Roberts	453	16.9	−13.5
Majority		338	12.6	
Turnout		2,677		
Green gain from Conservative		Swing		

=== 2023-2027 ===
Henfield By-Election, 29 February 2024
Party	Candidate	Votes	%	±%
Green	Gill Perry	668	44.2	+5.3
Conservative	Tim Lloyd	569	37.7	−1.9
Labour	Fiona Ayres	215	14.2	−16.7
Liberal Democrats	Nico Kearns	59	3.9	−3.3
Majority		99	6.5	
Turnout		1,511	33.3	
Green gain from Independent		Swing		

Southwater North By-Election, 29 February 2024
Party	Candidate	Votes	%	±%
Conservative	Claire Vickers	618	49.0	+11.2
Liberal Democrats	Gary Hayes	388	30.8	−13.0
Green	Jennifer Nuin Smith	162	12.9	+3.8
Labour	Minty Barlow	92	7.3	−2.0
Majority		230	18.2	
Turnout		1,260	28.8	
Conservative gain from Liberal Democrats		Swing		

Denne By-Election, 21 November 2024
Party	Candidate	Votes	%	±%
Conservative	Cheryl Sweeney	712	38.6	
Liberal Democrats	Ben Hewson	672	36.4	
Green	Jennifer Nuin Smith	255	13.8	
Labour	Cameron McGillivray	205	11.1	
Majority		40	2.2	
Turnout		1,844		
Conservative gain from Liberal Democrats		Swing		

Colgate and Rusper By-Election, 17 April 2025
Party	Candidate	Votes	%	±%
Liberal Democrats	Hannah Butler	453	30.3	
Conservative	Josh Bounds	406	27.2	
Green	Andrew Finnegan	375	25.1	
Reform	Robert Nye	206	13.8	
Labour	Gerard Kavanagh	53	3.5	
Majority		47	3.1	
Turnout		1,493		
Liberal Democrats gain from Conservative		Swing		

Itchingfield, Slinfold and Warnham By-Election, 7 May 2026
Party	Candidate	Votes	%	±%
Conservative	Ross Dye	773	31.7	
Liberal Democrats	Ed Skeates	757	31.0	
Reform	Robert Nye	662	27.1	
Green	Catherine Ross	248	10.2	
Majority		16	0.7	
Turnout		2,440		
Conservative gain from Liberal Democrats		Swing		
