= 1976 Horsham District Council election =

Local government election in England

- 6 May 1976

All 43 seats to Horsham District Council 22 seats needed for a majority
	First party	Second party	Third party
Party	Conservative	Independent	RA
Seats won	30	12	1
Seat change	▲13	▼11	▲1
	Fourth party
Party	Liberal
Seats won	0
Seat change	▼2

The 1976 Horsham District Council election took place on 6 May 1976 to elect members of Horsham District Council in England. It was held on the same day as other local elections. The Conservatives won a majority of 9 on the council, gaining from Independent. In a number of seats, candidates who stood as an Independent in 1973, when these seats were last contested, stood again as a Conservative Party candidate. Residents' association won their first seat to the council, winning a seat in Henfield. The Liberal Party lost both of their seats from the previous election three years ago.

== Council Composition ==
Prior to the election, the composition of the council was:

↓
23	17	2
Ind	Con	Lib

After the election, the composition of the council was:

↓
30	12	1
Con	Ind	RA

== Results summary ==
1976 Horsham District Council election
Party	Seats	Gains	Losses	Net gain/loss	Seats %	Votes %	Votes	+/−
Conservative	30	12	0	▲12	69.8	54.2	30,945	+19.0
Independent	12	0	11	▼11	27.9	20.3	11,607	-14.9
RA	1	1	0	▲1	2.3	2.4	1,342	+2.4
Labour	0	–	–	Steady	0.0	18.0	10,285	-3.4
Liberal	0	0	2	▼2	0.0	4.8	2,765	-10.3
National Party	0	–	–	Steady	0.0	0.3	180	+0.3

== Ward results ==
=== Ashington & Washington ===
Ashington & Washington
Party	Candidate	Votes	%	±%
Independent	Rowland T.	676	73.5	+2.0
Liberal	Francis V.	244	26.5	+26.5
Turnout			42.3	
Independent hold		Swing		

=== Billingshurst ===
Billingshurst
Party	Candidate	Votes	%	±%
Conservative	Longhurst K.	981	48.8	
Independent	Griffin C.	850	42.3	
National Party	Saunders D.	180	9.0	
Turnout			36.9	
Conservative hold		Swing		
Independent hold		Swing		

Griffin C. stood as a Conservative candidate and Longhurst K. stood as an independent in 1973, when this seat was last contested.

=== Bramber & Upper Beeding ===
Bramber & Upper Beeding
Party	Candidate	Votes	%	±%
Conservative	Milburn M.	983	46.2	+46.2
Independent	Sanford L.	765	35.9	+2.5
Liberal	Callard P.	380	17.9	−8.8
Turnout			39.1	
Conservative gain from Independent		Swing		
Independent hold		Swing		

=== Broadbridge Heath ===
Broadbridge Heath
Party	Candidate	Votes	%	±%
Conservative	McGregor R.	Unopposed		
Turnout			N/A	
Conservative gain from Liberal		Swing		

=== Cowfold ===
Cowfold
Party	Candidate	Votes	%	±%
Independent	Fowler S.	Unopposed		
Turnout			N/A	
Independent hold		Swing		

=== Henfield ===
Henfield
Party	Candidate	Votes	%	±%
RA	Jones K.	832	30.7	
Conservative	Jones T.	811	30.0	
Conservative	Corp G.	750		
Conservative	Wright F.	633		
Independent	Bishop L. Ms.	537	19.8	
RA	Summarsell R.	510		
Independent	Rickard W.	329	12.2	
Liberal	Seymour E.	198	7.3	
Liberal	Tysoe F.	174		
Turnout			45.2	
Residents’ association gain from Independent		Swing		
Conservative hold		Swing		
Conservative gain from Independent		Swing		

=== Horsham South ===
Horsham South
Party	Candidate	Votes	%	±%
Conservative	Pinion G.	1,512	59.5	+17.7
Conservative	Mauchel E. Ms.	1,503		
Conservative	Gould G.	1,458		
Conservative	Roberts W.	1,450		
Labour	O'Connor T.	1,029	40.5	+4.2
Labour	Thurston J. Ms.	900		
Labour	Colville P.	892		
Labour	Clements R.	882		
Turnout				
Conservative hold		Swing		
Conservative hold		Swing		
Conservative hold		Swing		
Conservative hold		Swing		

=== Horsham West ===
Horsham West
Party	Candidate	Votes	%	±%
Independent	Parsons W.	1,991	36.0	−2.7
Conservative	Jeffries D.	1,794	32.3	+1.0
Conservative	Collins M.	1,715		
Conservative	Moore B. Ms.	1,686		
Independent	Martin G.	987	17.9	−12.1
Labour	Evenden R.	756	13.7	+13.7
Turnout			51.4	
Independent hold		Swing		
Conservative hold		Swing		
Conservative gain from Independent		Swing		
Conservative hold		Swing		

=== Horsham North ===
Horsham North
Party	Candidate	Votes	%	±%
Conservative	Murrell A.	2,132	66.8	+29.3
Conservative	Link C. Ms.	2,122		
Conservative	Miller E.	2,092		
Conservative	West H. Ms.	2,061		
Conservative	Taylor J.	1,065		
Labour	Lamb P.	1,059	33.2	+4.6
Labour	Nevins R.	1,042		
Labour	Harris J.	1,033		
Labour	Battersby R.	1,007		
Labour	Prodger T.	949		
Turnout			46.7	
Conservative hold		Swing		
Conservative hold		Swing		
Conservative hold		Swing		
Conservative hold		Swing		
Conservative hold		Swing		

=== Nuthurst ===
Here
Party	Candidate	Votes	%	±%
Conservative	Mackenzie J.	Unopposed		
Turnout			N/A	
Conservative gain from Independent		Swing		

Mackenzie J. was elected as an independent unopposed when this seat was last contested.

=== Pulborough & Coldwatham ===
Pulborough & Coldwatham
Party	Candidate	Votes	%	±%
Conservative	Cousins B.	Unopposed		
Conservative	Gocher H.	Unopposed		
Turnout			N/A	
Conservative hold		Swing		
Conservative hold		Swing		

=== Roffey ===
Roffey
Party	Candidate	Votes	%	±%
Conservative	Bosanquet D.	1,043	78.6	
Conservative	Sheppard A.	935		
Labour	Harris R. Ms.	284	21.4	
Labour	Ivatts J.	249		
Turnout			38.8	
Conservative gain from Independent		Swing		
Conservative win (new seat)				

Bosanquet D. was elected as an independent in 1973, when this seat was last contested.

=== Rudgwick ===
Rudgwick
Party	Candidate	Votes	%	±%
Independent	Henderson P. Ms.	Unopposed		
Turnout			N/A	
Independent hold		Swing		

=== Rusper ===
Rusper
Party	Candidate	Votes	%	±%
Conservative	Phelps A. Ms.	Unopposed		
Turnout			N/A	
Conservative gain from Independent		Swing		

Phelps A. Ms. was elected unopposed as an independent in 1973, when this seat was last contested.

=== Shipley ===
Shipley
Party	Candidate	Votes	%	±%
Independent	Keen D.	Unopposed		
Turnout			N/A	
Independent hold		Swing		

=== Slinfold ===
Slinfold
Party	Candidate	Votes	%	±%
Conservative	Anderson A.	Unopposed		
Turnout			N/A	
Conservative gain from Independent		Swing		

=== Southwater ===
Southwater
Party	Candidate	Votes	%	±%
Independent	Cheal J.	813	34.3	−2.3
Independent	Charman M. Ms.	795	33.6	+1.3
Independent	Charman E.	512	21.7	+21.7
Independent	Francis R.	243	10.3	+10.3
Turnout			39.1	
Independent hold		Swing		
Independent hold		Swing		

=== Steyning ===
Steyning
Party	Candidate	Votes	%	±%
Independent	Dingemans M. Ms	1,121	40.6	−5.0
Independent	Mimmack J.	755	27.3	−5.0
Conservative	Foster P.	600	21.7	+21.7
Liberal	Paice R.	286	10.4	−8.8
Turnout			51.1	
Independent hold		Swing		
Independent hold		Swing		

=== Storrington ===
Storrington
Party	Candidate	Votes	%	±%
Conservative	Shepherd F.	979	49.6	+12.5
Conservative	Tunnell R.	707		
Independent	Ellis L.	558	28.3	+28.3
Liberal	Marlow D.	438	22.2	−15.1
Liberal	Dean P.	245		
Turnout			51.6	
Conservative gain from Liberal		Swing		
Conservative hold		Swing		

=== Sullington ===
Sullington
Party	Candidate	Votes	%	±%
Conservative	Rogers H.	406	58.8	−3.7
Liberal	Donaldson P.	284	41.2	+3.7
Turnout			49.3	
Conservative hold		Swing		

=== Thakeham ===
Thakeham
Party	Candidate	Votes	%	±%
Conservative	Jenkins E.	366	66.7	+24.0
Independent	Skinner H.	183	33.3	−24.0
Turnout			60.6	
Conservative gain from Independent		Swing		

=== Warnham ===
Warnham
Party	Candidate	Votes	%	±%
Conservative	Hodgson A.	484	70.5	
Labour	Ward G.	203	29.5	
Turnout			51.8	
Conservative gain from Independent		Swing		

Hodgson A. was elected unopposed as an independent in 1973, when this seat was last contested.

=== West Chiltington ===
West Chiltington
Party	Candidate	Votes	%	±%
Conservative	Gardner J.	677	84.3	
Liberal	Cleaver M. Ms.	126	15.7	
Turnout			52.0	
Conservative gain from Independent		Swing		

Gardner J. was elected unopposed as an independent in 1973, when this seat was last contested.

=== West Grinstead ===
West Grinstead
Party	Candidate	Votes	%	±%
Independent	Scragg J.	492	55.8	
Liberal	Pike D.	390	44.2	
Turnout			50.9	
Independent hold		Swing		
