= 1999 Horsham District Council election =

1999 UK local government election

- 6 May 1999

All 36 seats to Horsham District Council 19 seats needed for a majority
	First party	Second party	Third party
Party	Conservative	Liberal Democrats	Independent
Seats won	21	12	3
Seat change	▲4	▼12	▲1

The 1999 Horsham District Council election took place on 6 May 1999 to elect members of Horsham District Council in England. It was held on the same day as other local elections. The Conservatives won a majority of 3 on the council, gaining from the Liberal Democrats.

== Council Composition ==
Prior to the election, the composition of the council was:

↓
24	17	2
LDem	Con	Ind

After the election, the composition of the council was:

↓
21	12	3
Con	LDem	Ind

== Results summary ==
1999 Horsham District Council election
Party	Seats	Gains	Losses	Net gain/loss	Seats %	Votes %	Votes	+/−
Conservative	21			▲4	58.3	50.5	30,342	+8.9
Liberal Democrats	12			▼12	33.3	37.7	22,640	-8.5
Independent	3			▲1	8.3	4.8	2,881	+0.2
Labour	0			Steady	0.0	7.1	4,257	-0.6

== Ward results ==
=== Billingshurst ===
Billingshurst
Party	Candidate	Votes	%	±%
Conservative	Van De Bergh S. Ms.	637	40.8	+10.4
Liberal Democrats	Lawes G.	617	39.5	−5.6
Liberal Democrats	Baczkowski A. Ms.	584		
Conservative	Hollins J.	570		
Independent	Longhurst K.	158	10.1	−14.4
Labour	Scott P.	150	9.6	+9.6
Turnout			31.5	
Conservative gain from Liberal Democrats		Swing		
Liberal Democrats hold		Swing		

=== Bramber & Upper Beeding ===
Bramber & Upper Beeding
Party	Candidate	Votes	%	±%
Conservative	Williams S.	549	34.7	
Independent	Sanford L.	459	29.1	
Liberal Democrats	Deedman D.	418	26.5	
Labour	Neves M.	154	9.7	
Labour	Bonsey A. Ms.	147		
Turnout			32.9	
Conservative gain from Liberal Democrats		Swing		
Independent gain from Conservative		Swing		

=== Broadbridge Heath ===
Broadbridge Heath
Party	Candidate	Votes	%	±%
Liberal Democrats	Horner S. Ms.	321	50.6	−26.7
Conservative	Bradnum A.	207	32.6	+9.9
Labour	Goddard K. Ms.	107	16.9	+16.9
Turnout			29.2	
Liberal Democrats hold		Swing		

=== Chanctonbury ===
Chanctonbury
Party	Candidate	Votes	%	±%
Conservative	Harris A.	978	67.0	+15.9
Conservative	Jenkins E.	880		
Liberal Democrats	Cooper N.	481	33.0	−15.9
Turnout			34.5	
Conservative hold		Swing		
Conservative gain from Liberal Democrats		Swing		

=== Cowfold ===
Cowfold
Party	Candidate	Votes	%	±%
Conservative	Baldwin B.	523	73.9	+10.1
Liberal Democrats	Price L.	103	14.5	−21.7
Labour	Canham T.	82	11.6	+11.6
Turnout			32.9	
Conservative hold		Swing		

=== Denne ===
Denne
Party	Candidate	Votes	%	±%
Conservative	Nye R.	1,023	47.6	+5.2
Conservative	Charles J.	1,017		
Conservative	Tobutt P.	1,002		
Liberal Democrats	Sheldon D.	867	40.3	+1.5
Liberal Democrats	Mullarky P.	838		
Liberal Democrats	Yarlett J.	741		
Labour	Thurston J. Ms.	260	12.1	−6.7
Turnout			36.0	
Conservative hold		Swing		
Conservative hold		Swing		
Conservative hold		Swing		

=== Forest ===
Forest
Party	Candidate	Votes	%	±%
Liberal Democrats	Newman D.	909	52.7	+4.1
Liberal Democrats	Rutherford P. Ms.	902		
Liberal Democrats	Paffett P.	846		
Conservative	Collins M.	636	36.9	+1.4
Conservative	Scott I. Ms.	612		
Conservative	Wilkinson F.	598		
Labour	Skipton-Carter L. Ms.	179	10.4	−5.5
Turnout			30.6	
Liberal Democrats hold		Swing		
Liberal Democrats hold		Swing		
Liberal Democrats hold		Swing		

=== Henfield ===
Henfield
Party	Candidate	Votes	%	±%
Conservative	Marsh J.	1,015	39.6	+2.4
Independent	Matthews S. Ms.	941	36.8	−10.1
Conservative	Cook A. Ms.	850		
Liberal Democrats	Pierce A.	310	12.1	−3.8
Labour	Hanford R.	294	11.5	+11.5
Turnout			40.3	
Conservative hold		Swing		
Independent hold		Swing		

=== Holbrook ===
Holbrook
Party	Candidate	Votes	%	±%
Liberal Democrats	Millson A.	1,019	45.4	+2.0
Conservative	Baldwin A.	1,002	44.7	+7.6
Liberal Democrats	Lickiss M.	979		
Conservative	Pratt M.	958		
Labour	Hugl L. Ms.	223	9.9	−9.7
Labour	Brown R.	211		
Turnout			30.3	
Liberal Democrats hold		Swing		
Conservative gain from Liberal Democrats		Swing		

=== Itchingfield & Shipley ===
Itchingfield & Shipley
Party	Candidate	Votes	%	±%
Conservative	Vickers C. Ms.	577	69.9	+7.7
Liberal Democrats	Bryant M.	175	21.2	−16.6
Labour	McGarvey G.	74	9.0	+9.0
Turnout			39.2	
Conservative hold		Swing		

=== Nuthurst ===
Nuthurst
Party	Candidate	Votes	%	±%
Conservative	Ashwell S. Ms.	446	76.8	+13.0
Liberal Democrats	Clausen R. Ms.	101	17.4	−18.8
Labour	Chapman R.	34	5.9	+5.9
Turnout			43.3	
Conservative hold		Swing		

=== Pulborough & Coldwatham ===
Pulborough & Coldwatham
Party	Candidate	Votes	%	±%
Conservative	Downes M. Ms.	1,066	67.7	+5.4
Conservative	Paterson R.	1,023		
Liberal Democrats	French M.	305	19.4	−18.3
Liberal Democrats	Raja S.	228		
Labour	Britz J.	203	12.9	+12.9
Turnout			54.5	
Conservative hold		Swing		
Conservative hold		Swing		

=== Riverside ===
Riverside
Party	Candidate	Votes	%	±%
Liberal Democrats	Bevis A.	1,061	55.6	+5.0
Liberal Democrats	Sully C. Ms.	1,057		
Liberal Democrats	Clarke P. Ms.	1,052		
Conservative	Palmer B. Ms.	622	32.6	+0.1
Conservative	Mitchell C.	566		
Conservative	Wilkinson R. Ms.	537		
Labour	Nasskau L.	224	11.7	−5.2
Turnout			29.1	
Liberal Democrats hold		Swing		
Liberal Democrats hold		Swing		
Liberal Democrats hold		Swing		

=== Roffey North ===
Roffey North
Party	Candidate	Votes	%	±%
Liberal Democrats	Price B. Ms.	806	47.5	+0.9
Liberal Democrats	Paffett F. Ms.	731		
Conservative	Hilliard D.	703	41.4	+6.9
Conservative	Watson B.	604		
Labour	Thomas J.	188	11.1	−7.3
Turnout			32.9	
Liberal Democrats hold		Swing		
Liberal Democrats hold		Swing		

=== Rudgwick ===
Rudgwick
Party	Candidate	Votes	%	±%
Conservative	Bargman E. Ms.	514	78.1	+10.4
Liberal Democrats	Horner P.	103	15.7	−16.6
Labour	Mainwaring E.	41	6.2	+6.2
Turnout			32.6	
Conservative hold		Swing		

=== Rusper ===
Rusper
Party	Candidate	Votes	%	±%
Conservative	Kitchen E. Ms.	475	78.0	+6.3
Labour	Street M.	68	11.2	+11.2
Liberal Democrats	Brundish D.	66	10.8	−17.5
Turnout			33.1	
Conservative hold		Swing		

=== Slinfold ===
Slinfold
Party	Candidate	Votes	%	±%
Liberal Democrats	Wright D.	324	50.6	−20.1
Conservative	Mawer A.	292	45.6	+16.3
Labour	Corthine R.	24	3.8	+3.8
Turnout			47.9	
Liberal Democrats hold		Swing		

=== Southwater ===
Southwater
Party	Candidate	Votes	%	±%
Conservative	Howard I.	1,266	54.6	+12.1
Conservative	Dye G.	1,178		
Liberal Democrats	Stainton J. Ms.	829	35.7	−21.8
Liberal Democrats	Stainton P.	775		
Labour	Allen D.	224	9.7	+9.7
Labour	Spencer J.	171		
Turnout			34.4	
Conservative gain from Liberal Democrats		Swing		
Conservative gain from Liberal Democrats		Swing		

=== Steyning ===
Steyning
Party	Candidate	Votes	%	±%
Independent	Cockman G.	1,011	39.1	+1.5
Conservative	Lyth M. Ms.	774	29.9	−1.4
Liberal Democrats	Deedman R. Ms.	558	21.6	−9.5
Conservative	Galaud M.	511		
Labour	Neves V. Ms.	244	9.4	+9.4
Labour	Wheeler D.	159		
Turnout			37.9	
Independent hold		Swing		
Conservative hold		Swing		

=== Storrington ===
Storrington
Party	Candidate	Votes	%	±%
Conservative	Read P.	799	42.6	+7.7
Conservative	Butler N.	736		
Liberal Democrats	Girard M. Ms.	509	27.1	−21.4
Labour	Banks P. Ms.	257	13.7	+13.7
Independent	Brain J. Ms.	208	11.1	+11.1
Independent	Bates K.	104	5.5	+5.5
Turnout			37.8	
Conservative gain from Liberal Democrats		Swing		
Conservative gain from Liberal Democrats		Swing		

Brain J. Ms. was elected in Storrington as a Liberal Democrat in 1995, when this seat was last contested.

=== Sullington ===
Sullington
Party	Candidate	Votes	%	±%
Liberal Democrats	Banks D.	378	51.8	−18.9
Conservative	Urry S.	307	42.1	+12.8
Labour	Walter B.	45	6.2	+6.2
Turnout			41.6	
Liberal Democrats hold		Swing		

=== Trafalgar ===
Trafalgar
Party	Candidate	Votes	%	±%
Liberal Democrats	Chapman N.	1,192	54.9	+4.4
Liberal Democrats	Costin C. Ms.	1,114		
Liberal Democrats	Crosbie L.	1,002		
Conservative	Toubutt V. Ms.	759	34.9	−0.9
Conservative	Smith J. Ms.	755		
Conservative	Alder M.	737		
Labour	Dumbrill D. Ms.	221	10.2	−3.5
Turnout			44.8	
Liberal Democrats hold		Swing		
Liberal Democrats hold		Swing		
Liberal Democrats hold		Swing		

=== Warnham ===
Warnham
Party	Candidate	Votes	%	±%
Conservative	Burnham J. Ms.	482	77.1	+18.1
Liberal Democrats	Pearce T.	89	14.2	+0.3
Labour	McDonald K.	54	8.6	−18.6
Turnout			42.0	
Conservative hold		Swing		

=== West Chiltington ===
West Chiltington
Party	Candidate	Votes	%	±%
Conservative	Jackson M.	910	81.5	+8.3
Liberal Democrats	Hughes A.	122	10.9	−15.9
Labour	Pitt E.	84	7.5	+7.5
Turnout			38.6	
Conservative hold		Swing		

=== West Grinstead ===
West Grinstead
Party	Candidate	Votes	%	±%
Conservative	Howard J. Ms.	646	71.7	+12.6
Labour	Taylor C.	135	14.9	−11.5
Liberal Democrats	Duke M.	128	14.1	−0.4
Turnout			42.7	
Conservative hold		Swing		
