= 2015 Horsham District Council election =

2015 UK local government election

← 2011	7 May 2015	2019 →

All 44 seats to Horsham District Council 23 seats needed for a majority
	First party	Second party	Third party
Party	Conservative	Liberal Democrats	Independent
Seats won	39	4	1
Seat change	▲5	▼4	▼1
- Results of the 2015 Horsham District Council election

The 2015 Horsham District Council election took place on 7 May 2015 to elect members of Horsham District Council in England. It was held on the same day as other local elections and the 2015 United Kingdom general election. The Conservatives secured a majority of 17, which was the largest majority any party has ever achieved at a Horsham District Council election.

== Council Composition ==
Prior to the election, the composition of the council was:

↓
34	8	2
Con	LDem	Ind

After the election, the composition of the council was:

↓
39	4	1
Con	LDem	Ind

== Results summary ==
2015 Horsham District Council election
Party	Seats	Gains	Losses	Net gain/loss	Seats %	Votes %	Votes	+/−
Conservative	39	5	0	▲5	88.6	56.4	77,647	0.0
Liberal Democrats	4	0	4	▼4	9.1	17.2	23,732	-7.2
Independent	1	0	1	▼1	2.3	2.4	3,300	-1.3
UKIP	0	–	–	Steady	0.0	10.1	13,844	+3.3
Labour	0	-	-	Steady	0.0	7.8	10,736	+0.6
Green	0	–	–	Steady	0.0	5.9	8,071	+4.8
Peace	0	–	–	Steady	0.0	0.3	418	0.0

== Ward results ==
=== Billingshurst and Shipley ===
Billingshurst and Shipley
Party	Candidate	Votes	%	±%
Conservative	Nigel Jupp	2,883	38.6	−3.7
Conservative	Gordon Lindsay	2,532		
Conservative	Kathleen Rowbottom	2,424		
UKIP	Patrick Dearsley	1,301	17.4	+0.1
Liberal Democrats	Derek Brundish	1,209	16.2	−0.2
Green	Tia Kuchmy	1,072	14.3	+14.3
Labour	Keith Maslin	1,013	13.5	+1.4
Turnout			69.8	
Conservative hold		Swing		
Conservative hold		Swing		
Conservative hold		Swing		

=== Bramber, Upper Beeding and Woodmancote ===
Bramber, Upper Beeding and Woodmancote
Party	Candidate	Votes	%	±%
Conservative	David Coldwell	1,581	48.3	+3.9
Conservative	Ben Staines	1,542		
Liberal Democrats	David Boyle	741	22.6	−12.5
Green	Michael Croker	584	17.8	+17.8
Labour	Jean Sadgrove	366	11.2	+0.4
Labour	Adrian Norridge	334		
Turnout			70.5	
Conservative hold		Swing		
Conservative hold		Swing		

=== Broadbridge Heath ===
Broadbridge Heath
Party	Candidate	Votes	%	±%
Conservative	Matthew French	784	40.4	+3.1
Liberal Democrats	Malcolm Curnock	672	34.6	−3.3
UKIP	Uri Baran	304	15.7	+6.9
Green	Shaun Longhurst	180	9.3	+9.3
Turnout			70.3	
Conservative gain from Liberal Democrats		Swing		

=== Chanctonbury ===
Chanctonbury
Party	Candidate	Votes	%	±%
Conservative	Philip Circus	2,943	53.4	−3.7
Conservative	John Blackall	2,926		
Conservative	Eric Jenkins	2,586		
UKIP	Graham Croft-Smith	1,425	25.8	+13.0
Liberal Democrats	Richard Martin	1,147	20.8	+3.8
Turnout			75.0	
Conservative hold		Swing		
Conservative hold		Swing		
Conservative hold		Swing		

=== Chantry ===
Chantry
Party	Candidate	Votes	%	±%
Conservative	Raymond Dawe	3,413	45.6	−8.9
Conservative	James Sanson	2,967		
Conservative	Paul Marshall	2,771		
Liberal Democrats	Stephen Holbrook-Sishton	1,473	19.7	+1.5
UKIP	Peter Westrip	1,370	18.3	+5.4
Green	Katherine Hope	1,225	16.4	+16.4
Turnout			73.0	
Conservative hold		Swing		
Conservative hold		Swing		
Conservative hold		Swing		

=== Cowfold, Shermanbury and West Grinstead ===
Cowfold, Shermanbury and West Grinstead
Party	Candidate	Votes	%	±%
Conservative	Jonathan Chowen	2,087	71.4	+5.0
Conservative	Roger Clarke	2,071		
Liberal Democrats	Laurence Price	837	28.6	−5.0
Turnout			72.3	
Conservative hold		Swing		
Conservative hold		Swing		

=== Denne ===
Denne
Party	Candidate	Votes	%	±%
Conservative	Adrian Lee	1,253	31.8	−7.1
Conservative	Antony Hogben	1,228		
Independent	David Sheldon	797	20.2	+20.2
Liberal Democrats	Stephen Fairweather-Tall	738	18.7	−18.4
Labour	Kevin O'Sullivan	616	15.6	+1.5
UKIP	Raymond Toot	541	13.7	+3.8
Turnout			68.1	
Conservative hold		Swing		
Conservative gain from Liberal Democrats		Swing		

David Sheldon was elected as a Liberal Democrat in Denne ward in 2011, the year when this seat was last up for election, he resigned from the party in 2014.

=== Forest ===
Forest
Party	Candidate	Votes	%	±%
Liberal Democrats	Godfrey Newman	1,125	48.2	
Conservative	Linda Pettitt	987	42.3	
Green	Darrin Green	222	9.5	
Turnout			78.4	
Liberal Democrats hold		Swing		

=== Henfield ===
Henfield
Party	Candidate	Votes	%	±%
Independent	Michael Morgan	1,370	35.3	+35.3
Conservative	Brian O'Connell	1,250	32.2	+1.4
Conservative	Helena Croft	1,032		
Green	Steve Law	469	12.1	+12.1
Labour	Paul Crowe	440	11.3	+3.1
Liberal Democrats	Jessica Sproxton Miller	349	9.0	−3.4
Turnout			70.9	
Independent gain from Independent		Swing		
Conservative hold		Swing		

=== Holbrook East ===
Holbrook East
Party	Candidate	Votes	%	±%
Conservative	Andrew Baldwin	1,590	40.8	−19.5
Conservative	Karen Burgess	1,356		
Liberal Democrats	Andrew Sharp	698	17.9	−2.0
UKIP	Christopher Brown	587	15.0	+8.6
Labour	Sheila Chapman	582	14.9	+1.5
Green	Robert Turner	444	11.4	+11.4
Turnout			73.4	
Conservative hold		Swing		
Conservative hold		Swing		

=== Holbrook West ===
Holbrook West
Party	Candidate	Votes	%	±%
Conservative	Peter Burgess	1,711	49.7	−4.4
Conservative	Christian Mitchell	1,699		
Liberal Democrats	Peter Mullarky	675	19.6	−5.6
UKIP	John Randell	583	16.9	+9.2
Labour	Linda Hugl	474	13.8	+0.8
Labour	Anthony Guyton	426		
Turnout			73.7	
Conservative hold		Swing		
Conservative hold		Swing		

=== Horsham Park ===
Horsham Park
Party	Candidate	Votes	%	±%
Conservative	Josh Murphy	1,501	32.0	+2.3
Liberal Democrats	David Skipp	1,400	29.9	−2.7
Conservative	Connor Relleen	1,332		
Liberal Democrats	Gregory Collins	1,256		
Liberal Democrats	Frances Haigh	1,193		
Conservative	Robyn van Ryssen	1,062		
Labour	Carol Hayton	769	16.4	−2.5
Labour	Raymond Chapman	737		
Labour	David Hide	655		
UKIP	Ian Tandy	601	12.8	+3.9
Peace	Jim Duggan	418	8.9	−1.0
Turnout			66.1	
Conservative gain from Liberal Democrats		Swing		
Liberal Democrats hold		Swing		
Conservative hold		Swing		

=== Itchingfield, Slinfold and Warnham ===
Itchingfield, Slinfold and Warnham
Party	Candidate	Votes	%	±%
Conservative	Stuart Ritchie	1,661	52.5	+0.7
Conservative	Patricia Youtan	1,622		
UKIP	Stuart Aldridge	705	22.3	+11.3
Liberal Democrats	Cornelia Butler	519	16.4	−6.2
Liberal Democrats	John Fry	456		
Labour	Neal Harris	278	8.8	+8.8
Turnout			71.5	
Conservative hold		Swing		
Conservative hold		Swing		

=== Nuthurst ===
Nuthurst
Party	Candidate	Votes	%	±%
Conservative	Antoinette Bradnum	1,142	60.4	−8.3
Liberal Democrats	Lesley Hendy	283	15.0	−5.6
UKIP	Graham Harper	270	14.3	+3.5
Green	Darius Assassi	195	10.3	+10.3
Turnout			77.5	
Conservative hold		Swing		

=== Pulborough and Coldwatham ===
Pulborough and Coldwatham
Party	Candidate	Votes	%	±%
Conservative	Paul Clarke	1,940	47.5	−5.1
Conservative	Brian Donnelly	1,609		
UKIP	John Wallace	813	19.9	+7.1
UKIP	Elizabeth Wallace	592		
Green	Martin Dale	538	13.2	−1.4
Labour	Antony Bignell	422	10.3	+0.8
Liberal Democrats	Rosalyn Deedman	372	9.1	−1.5
Turnout			67.5	
Conservative hold		Swing		

=== Roffey North ===
Roffey North
Party	Candidate	Votes	%	±%
Conservative	Alan Britten	1,257	35.2	−4.2
Conservative	Jonathan Dancer	1,198		
Liberal Democrats	Anthony Bevis	879	24.6	−12.2
Liberal Democrats	Warwick Hellawell	836		
UKIP	Ivor Williams	634	17.8	+6.8
UKIP	Ruth Williams	545		
Labour	George Murrell	478	13.4	+0.6
Independent	Nicholas Butler	319	8.9	+8.9
Turnout			71.4	
Conservative hold		Swing		
Conservative gain from Liberal Democrats		Swing		

Independent candidate Nicholas Butler stood as a Liberal Democrat in 2011 in Roffey North.

=== Roffey South ===
Roffey South
Party	Candidate	Votes	%	±%
Conservative	Simon Torn	1,450	41.1	−3.9
Conservative	Roy Cornell	1,250		
UKIP	Roger Arthur	644	18.3	+7.8
Liberal Democrats	Belinda Walters	627	17.8	−12.3
UKIP	Tony Rickett	484		
Labour	Margaret Cornwell	454	12.9	−1.4
Labour	Ian Nicol	370		
Green	Allan Spraggon	351	10.0	+10.0
Turnout			67.3	
Conservative hold		Swing		
Conservative hold		Swing		

=== Rudgwick ===
Rudgwick
Party	Candidate	Votes	%	±%
Conservative	John Bailey	870	54.5	−6.2
Green	Graham Avery	726	45.5	+45.5
Turnout			87.1	
Conservative hold		Swing		

=== Rusper and Colgate ===
Rusper and Colgate
Party	Candidate	Votes	%	±%
Conservative	Elizabeth Kitchen	1,198	74.2	+0.5
Liberal Democrats	Anthony Millson	224	13.9	−1.2
Green	Darren Jugurnauth	192	11.9	+11.9
Turnout			75.0	
Conservative hold		Swing		

=== Southwater ===
Southwater
Party	Candidate	Votes	%	±%
Conservative	John Chidlow	2,583	35.8	−18.4
Conservative	Ian Howard	2,442		
Conservative	Claire Vickers	2,347		
Liberal Democrats	Gary Charman	1,233	17.1	−14.2
UKIP	Christopher Heath	1,099	15.2	+0.7
UKIP	Neil Whitear	946		
Independent	Roger Smith	814	11.3	+11.3
Green	Peter Shaw	801	11.1	+11.1
Liberal Democrats	Derek Deedman	743		
Labour	Jacqueline Little	690	9.6	+9.6
Turnout			71.6	
Conservative hold		Swing		
Conservative hold		Swing		
Conservative hold		Swing		

Former Horsham Football Club manager, Gary Charman, stood as a candidate for the Liberal Democrats in Southwater following the council rejecting the football clubs planning application for a stadium at Hop Oast. The location of the ground falls into the Southwater ward and was opposed by the Conservative councillors representing the ward at the time. A different application at the same location was approved in 2017.

=== Steyning ===
Steyning
Party	Candidate	Votes	%	±%
Conservative	Timothy Lloyd	1,907	46.2	+16.8
Conservative	Michael Willett	1,511		
Liberal Democrats	Nicholas Hopkinson	916	22.2	−1.6
Green	Robert Platt	680	16.5	+16.5
Labour	Jill Allen	628	15.2	+7.6
Labour	Elizabeth Edmonds	562		
Turnout			72.9	
Conservative gain from Independent		Swing		
Conservative hold		Swing		

=== Trafalgar ===
Trafalgar
Party	Candidate	Votes	%	±%
Liberal Democrats	Christine Costin	1,677	40.9	−4.8
Liberal Democrats	Leonard Crosbie	1,454		
Conservative	Ian Shepherd	1,185	28.9	−4.9
Conservative	Ronald Vimpany	964		
Labour	Alexandra Davis	442	10.8	+1.8
UKIP	Carol Bowring	400	9.8	+3.7
Green	Margaret Weir-Wilson	392	9.6	+4.2
Turnout			74.5	
Liberal Democrats hold		Swing		
Liberal Democrats hold		Swing		
