= 1995 Horsham District Council election =

1995 UK local government election

- 4 May 1995

All 43 seats to Horsham District Council 22 seats needed for a majority
	First party	Second party	Third party
Party	Liberal Democrats	Conservative	Independent
Seats won	24	17	2
Seat change	▲11	▼11	Steady

The 1995 Horsham District Council election took place on 4 May 1995 to elect members of Horsham District Council in England. It was held on the same day as other local elections. The Liberal Democrats gained control of the council from the Conservatives with a 3 seat majority. This was the first time ever the Conservative Party lost control of Horsham District Council since they first won overall control in 1976.

== Council composition ==
Prior to the election, the composition of the council was:

↓
33	6	2
Con	LDem	Ind

After the election, the composition of the council was:

↓
24	17	2
LDem	Con	Ind

== Results summary ==
1995 Horsham District Council election
Party	Seats	Gains	Losses	Net gain/loss	Seats %	Votes %	Votes	+/−
Liberal Democrats	24	11	0	▲11	55.8	46.2	27,912	+9.2
Conservative	17	1	12	▼11	39.5	41.6	25,125	+0.1
Independent	2	2	2	Steady	4.7	4.6	2,791	0.0
Labour	0	-	-	Steady	0.0	7.7	4,630	-8.1

== Ward results ==
=== Billingshurst ===
Billingshurst
Party	Candidate	Votes	%	±%
Liberal Democrats	Lawes G.	728	45.1	
Liberal Democrats	Baczkowski A. Ms.	615		
Conservative	Linney C.	491	30.4	
Conservative	Podger J.	459		
Independent	Longhurst K.	395	24.5	
Turnout			33.2	
Liberal Democrats gain from Conservative		Swing		
Liberal Democrats gain from Conservative		Swing		

=== Bramber & Upper Beeding ===
Bramber & Upper Beeding
Party	Candidate	Votes	%	±%
Liberal Democrats	Campbell J. M Ms.	Unopposed		
Conservative	Williams S.	Unopposed		
Turnout			N/A	
Liberal Democrats hold		Swing		
Conservative gain from Independent		Swing		

=== Broadbridge Heath ===
Broadbridge Heath
Party	Candidate	Votes	%	±%
Liberal Democrats	Horner S. Ms.	634	77.3	+15.4
Conservative	Ronaasen V. Ms.	186	22.7	−7.4
Turnout			36.4	
Liberal Democrats hold		Swing		

=== Chanctonbury ===
Chanctonbury
Party	Candidate	Votes	%	±%
Conservative	Jenkins E.	686	51.1	−2.0
Liberal Democrats	Parker C.	656	48.9	+2.0
Conservative	Ellis Y. Ms.	618		
Liberal Democrats	Stevens R.	589		
Turnout			37.6	
Conservative hold		Swing		
Liberal Democrats gain from Conservative		Swing		

=== Cowfold ===
Cowfold
Party	Candidate	Votes	%	±%
Conservative	Capo-Bianco S. Ms.	452	63.8	
Liberal Democrats	Holden E.	257	36.2	
Turnout			35.6	
Conservative hold		Swing		

=== Denne ===
Denne
Party	Candidate	Votes	%	±%
Conservative	Banyard L. Ms.	908	42.4	−8.6
Conservative	Charles J.	879		
Conservative	Collins M.	877		
Liberal Democrats	Miles N. Ms.	831	38.8	+11.3
Liberal Democrats	Lingwood S. Ms.	802		
Liberal Democrats	Pollard P.	753		
Labour	Thurston J. Ms.	402	18.8	−2.7
Labour	Macdonald K.	399		
Turnout			38.7	
Conservative hold		Swing		
Conservative hold		Swing		
Conservative hold		Swing		

=== Forest ===
Forest
Party	Candidate	Votes	%	±%
Liberal Democrats	Newman D.	1,004	48.6	+3.5
Liberal Democrats	Rutherford P. Ms.	989		
Liberal Democrats	Hyett J. Ms.	961		
Conservative	Hordern A.	733	35.5	−6.3
Conservative	Povey J.	687		
Conservative	Wilkinson F.	635		
Labour	Black D. Ms.	329	15.9	+2.8
Labour	Uwins S.	296		
Turnout			38.7	
Liberal Democrats hold		Swing		
Liberal Democrats hold		Swing		
Liberal Democrats gain from Conservative		Swing		

=== Henfield ===
Henfield
Party	Candidate	Votes	%	±%
Independent	Matthews S. Ms.	1,065	46.9	
Conservative	Marsh J.	844	37.2	
Conservative	Howard M.	771		
Liberal Democrats	Clausen R. Ms.	362	15.9	
Liberal Democrats	Price L.	329		
Turnout			41.4	
Independent gain from Independent		Swing		
Conservative hold		Swing		

=== Holbrook ===
Holbrook
Party	Candidate	Votes	%	±%
Liberal Democrats	Dale S. Ms.	905	43.4	−4.4
Liberal Democrats	Millson A.	840		
Conservative	Darby E. Ms.	773	37.1	−10.7
Conservative	Godwin G.	771		
Labour	Chapman R.	408	19.6	−8.9
Labour	Harper J. Ms.	353		
Turnout			33.1	
Liberal Democrats gain from Conservative		Swing		
Liberal Democrats gain from Conservative		Swing		

=== Itchingfield & Shipley ===
Itchingfield & Shipley
Party	Candidate	Votes	%	±%
Conservative	Vickers C. Ms.	466	62.2	−5.2
Liberal Democrats	Baker J. Ms.	283	37.8	+37.8
Turnout			37.3	
Conservative hold		Swing		

=== Nuthurst ===
Nuthurst
Party	Candidate	Votes	%	±%
Conservative	Mortlock M. Ms.	444	63.8	
Liberal Democrats	Brundish D.	252	36.2	
Turnout			53.3	
Conservative hold		Swing		

=== Pulborough & Coldwatham ===
Pulborough & Coldwatham
Party	Candidate	Votes	%	±%
Conservative	Copeman G.	846	62.3	
Conservative	Howarth J.	839		
Liberal Democrats	French M.	512	37.7	
Liberal Democrats	Hughes A.	422		
Turnout			35.1	
Conservative hold		Swing		
Conservative hold		Swing		

=== Riverside ===
Riverside
Party	Candidate	Votes	%	±%
Liberal Democrats	Sully C. Ms.	1,246	50.6	+1.8
Liberal Democrats	Clarke P. Ms.	1,225		
Liberal Democrats	Howell J.	1,154		
Conservative	Watson B.	800	32.5	−1.6
Conservative	John P.	757		
Labour	Burton G.	415	16.9	+4.1
Labour	Burton A. Ms.	385		
Turnout			38.1	
Liberal Democrats hold		Swing		
Liberal Democrats hold		Swing		
Liberal Democrats hold		Swing		

=== Roffey North ===
Roffey North
Party	Candidate	Votes	%	±%
Liberal Democrats	Price B. Ms.	884	47.1	
Liberal Democrats	Owen E.	795		
Conservative	Hilliard D.	647	34.5	
Conservative	Ramsey V.	538		
Labour	Baughan R.	346	18.4	
Labour	Gillians E.	274		
Turnout			38.5	
Liberal Democrats gain from Conservative		Swing		
Liberal Democrats gain from Conservative		Swing		

=== Rudgwick ===
Rudgwick
Party	Candidate	Votes	%	±%
Conservative	Niven L. Ms.	469	67.7	+11.7
Liberal Democrats	Allen J. Ms.	224	32.3	−11.7
Turnout			36.8	
Conservative hold		Swing		

=== Rusper ===
Rusper
Party	Candidate	Votes	%	±%
Conservative	Kitchen E. Ms.	477	71.7	
Liberal Democrats	Abrahams N.	188	28.3	
Turnout			36.6	
Conservative hold		Swing		

=== Slinfold ===
Slinfold
Party	Candidate	Votes	%	±%
Liberal Democrats	Chisholm A.	342	70.7	+21.8
Conservative	Vanden Bergh S.	142	29.3	−7.2
Turnout			37.8	
Liberal Democrats hold		Swing		

=== Southwater ===
Southwater
Party	Candidate	Votes	%	±%
Liberal Democrats	Stainton J. Ms.	1,280	57.5	+1.2
Liberal Democrats	Stainton P.	1,229		
Conservative	Lockwood W.	948	42.5	+10.1
Turnout			40.0	
Liberal Democrats hold		Swing		
Liberal Democrats hold		Swing		

=== Steyning ===
Steyning
Party	Candidate	Votes	%	±%
Independent	Cockman G.	1,063	37.6	+37.6
Conservative	Lee S. Ms.	885	31.3	−13.6
Liberal Democrats	Taylor F.	879	31.1	−3.6
Conservative	Ward M. Ms.	729		
Turnout			42.1	
Independent gain from Conservative		Swing		
Conservative hold		Swing		

=== Storrington ===
Storrington
Party	Candidate	Votes	%	±%
Liberal Democrats	Brain J. Ms.	786	48.5	−5.1
Liberal Democrats	Walker L.	697		
Conservative	Pope J.	565	34.9	−11.5
Conservative	Riches W.	486		
Independent	Parminter K.	268	16.6	+16.6
Turnout			40.3	
Liberal Democrats hold		Swing		
Liberal Democrats hold		Swing		

=== Sullington ===
Sullington
Party	Candidate	Votes	%	±%
Liberal Democrats	Banks D.	530	70.7	−0.3
Conservative	Goodfellow J.	220	29.3	+0.3
Turnout			50.5	
Liberal Democrats hold		Swing		

=== Trafalgar ===
Trafalgar
Party	Candidate	Votes	%	±%
Liberal Democrats	Chapman N.	1,118	50.5	+25.2
Liberal Democrats	Costin C. Ms.	1,068		
Liberal Democrats	Crosbie L.	1,021		
Conservative	Smith J. Ms.	793	35.8	−11.4
Conservative	Howes D.	776		
Conservative	Miller M. Ms.	770		
Labour	Dumbrill D. Ms.	304	13.7	−2.8
Labour	Gale S.	278		
Turnout			51.1	
Liberal Democrats gain from Conservative		Swing		
Liberal Democrats gain from Conservative		Swing		
Liberal Democrats gain from Conservative		Swing		

=== Warnham ===
Warnham
Party	Candidate	Votes	%	±%
Conservative	Burnham J. Ms.	417	59.0	
Labour	Ward G.	192	27.2	
Liberal Democrats	Pearce T.	98	13.9	
Turnout			51.8	
Conservative hold		Swing		

=== West Chiltington ===
West Chiltington
Party	Candidate	Votes	%	±%
Conservative	Jackson M.	784	73.2	
Liberal Democrats	Stoneley L. Ms.	287	26.8	
Turnout			38.9	
Conservative hold		Swing		

=== West Grinstead ===
West Grinstead
Party	Candidate	Votes	%	±%
Conservative	McKenzie E. Ms.	557	59.1	
Labour	Mallinson J.	249	26.4	
Liberal Democrats	Horner P.	137	14.5	
Turnout			44.1	
Conservative hold		Swing		
