= 1973 Horsham District Council election =

1973 UK local government election

- 7 June 1973

All seats to Horsham District Council 22 seats needed for a majority
	First party	Second party	Third party
Party	Independent	Conservative	Liberal
Seats won	23	17	2

The 1973 Horsham District Council election was the first ever for the council and took place on 7 June 1973 to elect members of Horsham District Council in England. It was held on the same day as other local elections. Independent councillors secured a majority of two with 23 seats, the Conservatives won 17 and the Liberal Party won 2. Labour also took part in the elections, fielding candidates in Horsham South & Horsham North only. The Liberal Party were successful in Broadbridge Heath and they were able to secure a seat in Storrington. The Conservative Party achieved good results in some rural areas but they were able to win the vast amount of their seats in the town. Independent councillors won a majority of seats in the villages in the district, sometimes unopposed, some later stood as a Conservative candidate three years later in the next set of elections for the Council.

== Council Composition ==
After the election, the composition of the council was:

↓
23	17	2
Ind	Con	Lib

== Results summary ==
1973 Horsham District Council election
Party	Seats	Gains	Losses	Net gain/loss	Seats %	Votes %	Votes	+/−
Independent	23	–	–	-	54.8	27.0	8,497	
Conservative	17	–	–	-	40.5	35.2	11,085	
Liberal	2	–	–	-	4.8	15.1	4,746	
Labour	0	–	–	-	0.0	21.4	6,761	
Other	0	–	–	-	0.0	1.4	438	

== Ward results ==
=== Ashington & Washington ===
Ashington & Washington
Party	Candidate	Votes	%	±%
Independent	Rowland T.	377	71.5	
Independent	Pease P. Ms.	150	28.5	
Turnout			25.7	
Independent win (new seat)				

=== Billingshurst ===
Billingshurst
Party	Candidate	Votes	%	±%
Conservative	Griffin C.	514	52.1	
Independent	Longhurst K.	472	47.9	
Conservative	Gillingham D.	467		
Turnout			30.8	
Conservative win (new seat)				
Independent win (new seat)				

=== Bramber & Upper Beeding ===
Bramber & Upper Beeding
Party	Candidate	Votes	%	±%
Independent	Emsley D.	668	39.9	
Independent	Sanford L.	559	33.4	
Liberal	Callard P.	446	26.7	
Liberal	Rice M.	340		
Turnout			31.4	
Independent win (new seat)				
Independent win (new seat)				

=== Broadbridge Heath ===
Broadbridge Heath
Party	Candidate	Votes	%	±%
Liberal	Michie I.	281	55.2	
Independent	Dunkerton F.	228	44.8	
Turnout			34.0	
Liberal win (new seat)				

=== Cowfold ===
Cowfold
Party	Candidate	Votes	%	±%
Independent	Fowler S.	Unopposed		
Turnout			N/A	
Independent win (new seat)				

=== Henfield ===
Henfield
Party	Candidate	Votes	%	±%
Independent	Atkins A. Ms.	Unopposed		
Conservative	Bishop L. Ms.	Unopposed		
Independent	Coleman B.	Unopposed		
Turnout			N/A	
Independent win (new seat)				
Conservative win (new seat)				
Independent win (new seat)				

=== Horsham South ===
Horsham South
Party	Candidate	Votes	%	±%
Conservative	Mauchel E. Ms.	940	41.8	
Conservative	Roberts W.	932		
Conservative	Pinion G.	921		
Conservative	Hassall B.	881		
Labour	O'Connor T.	816	36.3	
Labour	Pickup D.	727		
Labour	Healy P.	712		
Labour	Oakeshott E. Ms.	709		
Liberal	Armour-Milne J. Ms.	494	22.0	
Liberal	Armour-Milne J.	482		
Turnout			38.0	
Conservative win (new seat)				
Conservative win (new seat)				
Conservative win (new seat)				
Conservative win (new seat)				

=== Horsham West ===
Horsham West
Party	Candidate	Votes	%	±%
Independent	Parsons W.	1,403	38.7	
Conservative	Lane F.	1,137	31.3	
Independent	Martin G.	1,090	30.0	
Conservative	Moore B. Ms.	1,027		
Conservative	Windrum A.	984		
Conservative	Collins M.	727		
Turnout			42.5	
Independent win (new seat)				
Conservative win (new seat)				
Independent win (new seat)				
Conservative win (new seat)				

=== Horsham North ===
Horsham North
Party	Candidate	Votes	%	±%
Conservative	West E. Ms.	1,078	37.5	
Conservative	Murrell A.	1,066		
Conservative	Simpson M.	1,042		
Conservative	Miller E.	1,035		
Conservative	Crighton S. Ms.	942		
Labour	Thurston J. Ms.	822	28.6	
Labour	Thompson D.	787		
Labour	Ward G.	751		
Labour	Thompson J. Ms.	722		
Labour	McCoy J.	715		
Liberal	Hobbs G.	594	20.7	
	Hellyer P.	378	13.2	
Turnout			38.8	
Conservative win (new seat)				
Conservative win (new seat)				
Conservative win (new seat)				
Conservative win (new seat)				
Conservative win (new seat)				

=== Nuthurst ===
Nuthurst
Party	Candidate	Votes	%	±%
Independent	Mackenzie J.	Unopposed		
Turnout			N/A	
Independent win (new seat)				

=== Pulborough & Coldwatham ===
Pulborough & Coldwatham
Party	Candidate	Votes	%	±%
Conservative	Gocher H.	827	79.4	
Conservative	Cousins B.	820		
Liberal	Rudd V. Ms.	215	20.6	
Liberal	Deadman P.	208		
Turnout			30.5	
Conservative win (new seat)				
Conservative win (new seat)				

=== Roffey ===
Roffey
Party	Candidate	Votes	%	±%
Independent	Bosanquet D.	485	38.7	
Conservative	Sheppard A.	482	38.4	
Liberal	Lewis D.	287	22.9	
Turnout			39.3	
Independent win (new seat)				

=== Rudgwick ===
Rudgwick
Party	Candidate	Votes	%	±%
Independent	Henderson P. Ms.	426	73.1	
Independent	Boyle R.	157	26.9	
Turnout			36.1	
Independent win (new seat)				

=== Rusper ===
Rusper
Party	Candidate	Votes	%	±%
Independent	Phelps A. Ms.	Unopposed		
Turnout			N/A	
Independent win (new seat)				

=== Shipley ===
Shipley
Party	Candidate	Votes	%	±%
Independent	Burrell A. Ms.	Unopposed		
Turnout			N/A	
Independent win (new seat)				

=== Slinfold ===
Slinfold
Party	Candidate	Votes	%	±%
Independent	Coxon M. Ms.	430	51.9	
Independent	Gordon Clark P. Ms.	398	48.1	
Turnout			41.8	
Independent win (new seat)				

=== Southwater ===
Southwater
Party	Candidate	Votes	%	±%
Independent	Cheal J.	550	36.6	
Independent	Charman M. Ms.	485	32.3	
Independent	Twelvetrees J. Ms.	379	25.2	
Independent	Dawson M. Ms.	88	5.9	
Turnout			17.8	
Independent win (new seat)				
Independent win (new seat)				

=== Steyning ===
Steyning
Party	Candidate	Votes	%	±%
Independent	Dingemans M. Ms.	943	45.6	
Independent	Mimmack J.	669	32.3	
Liberal	Campbell J.	398	19.2	
	Avey C.	60	2.9	
Turnout			47.8	
Independent win (new seat)				
Independent win (new seat)				

=== Storrington ===
Storrington
Party	Candidate	Votes	%	±%
Liberal	Marlow D.	466	37.3	
Conservative	Shepherd F.	464	37.1	
Liberal	Adsett A. Ms.	386		
Conservative	Smallwood C.	383		
Independent	Eddolls F.	321	25.7	
Turnout			38.7	
Liberal win (new seat)				
Conservative win (new seat)				

=== Sullington ===
Sullington
Party	Candidate	Votes	%	±%
Conservative	Rogers H.	248	62.5	
Liberal	Jones L. Ms.	149	37.5	
Turnout			31.3	
Conservative win (new seat)				

=== Thakeham ===
Thakeham
Party	Candidate	Votes	%	±%
Independent	Skinner H.	217	57.3	
Conservative	How J.	162	42.7	
Turnout			42.5	
Independent win (new seat)				

=== Warnham ===
Warnham
Party	Candidate	Votes	%	±%
Independent	Hodgson A.	Unopposed		
Turnout			N/A	
Independent win (new seat)				

=== West Chiltington ===
West Chiltington
Party	Candidate	Votes	%	±%
Independent	Gardner J.	Unopposed		
Turnout			N/A	
Independent win (new seat)				

=== West Grinstead ===
West Grinstead
Party	Candidate	Votes	%	±%
Independent	Scragg J.	Unopposed		
Turnout			N/A	
Independent win (new seat)				
