= 1991 Horsham District Council election =

1991 UK local government election

- 2 May 1991

All 43 seats to Horsham District Council 22 seats needed for a majority
	First party	Second party	Third party
Party	Conservative	Liberal Democrats	Independent
Seats won	28	13	2
Seat change	▼5	▲7	▼2

The 1991 Horsham District Council election took place on 2 May 1991 to elect members of Horsham District Council in England. It was held on the same day as other local elections. The Conservatives retained control of the council with a reduced majority. The Liberal Democrats gained a net total of 7 and Independent candidates had 2 councillors elected.

== Council composition ==
Prior to the election, the composition of the council was:

↓
33	6	4
Con	SDP-Lib	Ind

After the election, the composition of the council was:

↓
28	13	2
Con	Lib Dem	Ind

== Results summary ==
1991 Horsham District Council election
Party	Seats	Gains	Losses	Net gain/loss	Seats %	Votes %	Votes	+/−
Conservative	28	3	8	▼5	65.1	41.5	14,922	-12.2
Liberal Democrats	13	8	1	▲7	30.2	37.0	13,292	+6.9
Independent	2	0	2	▼2	4.7	4.6	1,638	-0.9
Labour	0	–	–	Steady	0.0	15.8	5,692	+8.0
Green	0	–	–	Steady	0.0	0.8	289	-0.5
Ind. Conservative	0	–	–	Steady	0.0	0.2	92	+0.2

== Ward results ==
=== Billingshurst ===
Billingshurst
Party	Candidate	Votes	%	±%
Conservative	Van Den Bergh S. Ms.*	Unopposed		
Conservative	Jones B.	Unopposed		
Turnout			N/A	
Conservative gain from Liberal Democrats		Swing		
Conservative hold		Swing		

=== Bramber & Upper Beeding ===
Bramber & Upper Beeding
Party	Candidate	Votes	%	±%
Liberal Democrats	Campbell J. Ms.	880	37.9	−0.9
Independent	Sanford L.	833	35.9	−1.1
Conservative	Williamson V. Ms.	608	26.2	+2.1
Turnout			67.2	
Liberal Democrats hold		Swing		
Independent hold		Swing		

=== Broadbridge Heath ===
Broadbridge Heath
Party	Candidate	Votes	%	±%
Liberal Democrats	Horner S. Ms.	652	61.9	+15.8
Conservative	Gillman L. Ms.	317	30.1	−17.0
Labour	Duffy P.	84	8.0	+1.1
Turnout			45.8	
Liberal Democrats gain from Conservative		Swing		

=== Chanctonbury ===
Chanctonbury
Party	Candidate	Votes	%	±%
Conservative	Jenkins E.	928	53.1	−9.4
Conservative	Smith P.	876		
Liberal Democrats	Greensmith A. Ms.	821	46.9	+9.4
Liberal Democrats	House G. Ms.	789		
Turnout			46.5	
Conservative hold		Swing		
Conservative hold		Swing		

=== Cowfold ===
Cowfold
Party	Candidate	Votes	%	±%
Conservative	Capo-Bianco S. Ms.	Unopposed		
Turnout			N/A	
Conservative hold		Swing		

=== Denne ===
Denne
Party	Candidate	Votes	%	±%
Conservative	Billington P.	1,351	51.0	−4.5
Conservative	Palmer B. Ms.	1,340		
Conservative	Hogben E. Ms.	1,287		
Liberal Democrats	Eeles N. Ms.	730	27.5	−3.3
Liberal Democrats	Beeson M. Ms.	714		
Labour	Thurston J. Ms.	570	21.5	+7.8
Turnout			48.9	
Conservative hold		Swing		
Conservative hold		Swing		
Conservative hold		Swing		

=== Forest ===
Forest
Party	Candidate	Votes	%	±%
Liberal Democrats	Rutherford P. Ms.	1,196	45.1	+10.3
Liberal Democrats	Newman D.	1,137		
Conservative	Mauchel E. Ms.	1,109	41.8	−9.3
Conservative	Sanson J.	1,038		
Conservative	Wilkinson F.	958		
Labour	Dumbrill D. Ms.	347	13.1	−1.0
Labour	Uwins B. Ms.	278		
Turnout			48.2	
Liberal Democrats gain from Conservative		Swing		
Liberal Democrats gain from Conservative		Swing		
Conservative hold		Swing		

=== Henfield ===
Henfield
Party	Candidate	Votes	%	±%
Independent	Corp G.	Unopposed		
Conservative	Howard M.	Unopposed		
Turnout			N/A	
Independent hold		Swing		
Conservative hold		Swing		

=== Holbrook ===
Holbrook
Party	Candidate	Votes	%	±%
Conservative	Darby E. Ms.	901	47.8	−1.5
Conservative	Godwin G.	890		
Labour	Lamb P. Dr.	536	28.5	+11.1
Liberal Democrats	Millson A.	446	23.7	9.7
Labour	Uwins S.	420		
Turnout			40.3	
Conservative hold		Swing		
Conservative hold		Swing		

=== Itchingfield & Shipley ===
Itchingfield & Shipley
Party	Candidate	Votes	%	±%
Conservative	Vickers C. Ms.	520	67.4	
Independent	Keen D.	252	32.6	
Turnout			39.1	
Conservative hold		Swing		

Keen D. was elected in Itchingfield & Shipley as a Conservative in 1987, when this seat was last contested.

=== Nuthurst ===
Nuthurst
Party	Candidate	Votes	%	±%
Conservative	Walker S. Ms.	Unopposed		
Turnout			N/A	
Conservative win (new seat)				

=== Pulborough & Coldwatham ===
Pulborough & Coldwatham
Party	Candidate	Votes	%	±%
Conservative	Copeman G.	Unopposed		
Conservative	Pope J.	Unopposed		
Turnout			N/A	
Conservative hold		Swing		
Conservative hold		Swing		

=== Riverside ===
Riverside
Party	Candidate	Votes	%	±%
Liberal Democrats	Parminter K. Ms.	1,627	48.8	+7.1
Liberal Democrats	Sully C. Ms.	1,377		
Liberal Democrats	White V. Ms.	1,282		
Conservative	Allcard D.	1,138	34.1	−8.1
Conservative	Watson B.	1,077		
Conservative	Beagley P. Ms.	1,031		
Labour	Barrett D.	427	12.8	−3.3
Labour	Richardson P.	334		
Labour	Street M.	332		
Green	Pinfold J.	145	4.3	+4.3
Green	King T.	144		
Turnout			46.3	
Liberal Democrats gain from Conservative		Swing		
Liberal Democrats gain from Conservative		Swing		
Liberal Democrats hold		Swing		

=== Roffey North ===
Roffey North
Party	Candidate	Votes	%	±%
Conservative	Hilliard D.	937	47.0	+0.2
Conservative	Terner G.	804		
Liberal Democrats	Price B. Ms.	627	31.5	−5.8
Labour	Spottiswoode J. Ms.	429	21.5	+5.5
Labour	Gillians E.	421		
Turnout			41.4	
Conservative hold		Swing		
Conservative hold		Swing		

=== Rudgwick ===
Rudgwick
Party	Candidate	Votes	%	±%
Conservative	Niven L. Ms.	510	56.0	
Liberal Democrats	Lawrence J. Ms.	401	44.0	
Turnout			53.5	
Conservative gain from Independent		Swing		

=== Rusper ===
Rusper
Party	Candidate	Votes	%	±%
Conservative	Kitchen E. Ms.	Unopposed		
Turnout			N/A	
Conservative hold		Swing		

=== Slinfold ===
Slinfold
Party	Candidate	Votes	%	±%
Liberal Democrats	Chisholm A.	307	48.9	+48.9
Conservative	Mason D.	229	36.5	−11.7
Ind. Conservative	Shields N.	92	14.6	+14.6
Turnout			47.0	
Liberal Democrats gain from Conservative		Swing		

=== Southwater ===
Southwater
Party	Candidate	Votes	%	±%
Liberal Democrats	Stainton J. Ms.	1,418	56.3	+2.7
Liberal Democrats	Stainton P.	1,273		
Conservative	Banks D.	816	32.4	−8.9
Conservative	Youtan J.	631		
Independent	D'Singh D.	284	11.3	+11.3
Turnout			46.0	
Liberal Democrats hold		Swing		
Liberal Democrats hold		Swing		

=== Steyning ===
Steyning
Party	Candidate	Votes	%	±%
Conservative	Lee S. Ms.	1,021	44.9	+16.0
Conservative	Ward M. Ms.	908		
Liberal Democrats	Clarke M. Ms.	790	34.7	+16.0
Labour	Drew D.	464	20.4	+13.5
Labour	Greenland P.	334		
Turnout			50.4	
Conservative hold		Swing		
Conservative gain from Independent		Swing		

=== Storrington ===
Storrington
Party	Candidate	Votes	%	±%
Liberal Democrats	Walker L.	895	53.6	+22.9
Liberal Democrats	Brain J. Ms.	852		
Conservative	Hyde M.	776	46.4	−15.8
Conservative	Blackman R. Ms.	737		
Turnout			42.4	
Liberal Democrats gain from Conservative		Swing		
Liberal Democrats gain from Conservative		Swing		

=== Sullington ===
Sullington
Party	Candidate	Votes	%	±%
Liberal Democrats	Banks D	693	71.0	+15.0
Conservative	James J.	283	29.0	−13.7
Turnout			56.8	
Liberal Democrats hold		Swing		

=== Trafalgar ===
Trafalgar
Party	Candidate	Votes	%	±%
Conservative	Smith J. Ms.	1,152	47.2	−5.3
Conservative	Howes D.	1,151		
Conservative	Miller M. Ms.	1,138		
Liberal Democrats	Allen J. Ms.	616	25.3	−4.8
Liberal Democrats	Horner P.	568		
Labour	Brady E.	402	16.5	−0.9
Labour	Lacey R.	314		
Independent	Owen E.	269	11.0	+11.0
Turnout			52.9	
Conservative hold		Swing		
Conservative hold		Swing		
Conservative hold		Swing		

=== Warnham ===
Warnham
Party	Candidate	Votes	%	±%
Conservative	Burnham J. Ms.	448	69.8	+7.5
Liberal Democrats	Bell M. Ms.	194	30.2	−4.0
Turnout			49.8	
Conservative hold		Swing		

=== West Chiltington ===
West Chiltington
Party	Candidate	Votes	%	±%
Conservative	Cheshire J.	Unopposed		
Turnout			N/A	
Conservative hold		Swing		

=== West Grinstead ===
West Grinstead
Party	Candidate	Votes	%	±%
Conservative	McKenzie E. Ms.	Unopposed		
Turnout			N/A	
Conservative hold		Swing		
