= 1983 Horsham District Council election =

1983 UK local government election

- 5 May 1983

All 42 seats to Horsham District Council 22 seats needed for a majority
	First party	Second party	Third party
Party	Conservative	Independent	Alliance
Seats won	35	5	2
Seat change	▲2	▼3	▲1
	Fourth party
Party	RA
Seats won	0
Seat change	▼1

The 1983 Horsham District Council election took place on 5 May 1983 to elect members of Horsham District Council in England. It was held on the same day as other local elections. The Conservatives retained control of the council with 35 seats, a majority of 14, Independent candidates won 5 seats and the SDP–Liberal Alliance won 2.

== Council Composition ==
Prior to the election, the composition of the council was:

↓
33	8	1	1
Con	Ind	Lib	RA

After the election, the composition of the council was:

↓
35	5	2
Con	Ind	All

== Results summary ==
1983 Horsham District Council election
Party	Seats	Gains	Losses	Net gain/loss	Seats %	Votes %	Votes	+/−
Conservative	35			▲2	83.3	58.7	33,929	-1.9
Independent	5			▼3	11.9	8.9	5,149	-2.6
Alliance	2			▲1	4.8	20.9	12,057	+15.6
Labour	0			Steady	0.0	9.3	5,381	-8.6
Ind. Conservative	0			Steady	0.0	1.3	772	+1.3
Ecology	0			Steady	0.0	0.3	161	+0.3
Other	0			Steady	0.0	0.6	366	+0.6

== Ward results ==
=== Billingshurst ===
Billingshurst
Party	Candidate	Votes	%	±%
Alliance	Bolden T.	872	35.5	
Conservative	Van Den Bergh S. Ms.	795	32.4	
Conservative	Birkwood J.	786		
Independent	Longhurst K.	442	18.0	
Ind. Conservative	Griffin C.	347	14.1	
Turnout			60.0	
Alliance gain from Independent		Swing		
Conservative gain from Independent		Swing		

=== Bramber & Upper Beeding ===
Bramber & Upper Beeding
Party	Candidate	Votes	%	±%
Alliance	Campbell J. Ms.	1,152	48.5	+6.4
Independent	Sanford L.	857	36.1	+5.2
	Nutt S.	366	15.4	+15.4
Turnout			58.4	
Alliance hold		Swing		
Independent hold		Swing		

=== Broadbridge Heath ===
Broadbridge Heath
Party	Candidate	Votes	%	±%
Conservative	McGregor R.	475	52.5	−6.8
Labour	Lamb H. Ms.	221	24.4	−16.3
Alliance	Parr-Voller R.	209	23.1	+23.1
Turnout			56.7	
Conservative hold		Swing		

=== Chanctonbury ===
Chanctonbury
Party	Candidate	Votes	%	±%
Conservative	Burningham J.	1,233	67.7	
Conservative	Jenkins D.	1,208		
Alliance	De-Ath G.	457	25.1	
Labour	Allen J.	131	7.2	
Labour	McGregor J.	110		
Turnout			51.1	
Conservative hold		Swing		
Conservative hold		Swing		

=== Cowfold ===
Cowfold
Party	Candidate	Votes	%	±%
Conservative	Wedd R.	Unopposed		
Turnout			N/A	
Conservative hold		Swing		

=== Denne ===
Denne
Party	Candidate	Votes	%	±%
Conservative	Palmer B. Ms.	1,302	53.8	−8.4
Conservative	Pinion C.	1,283		
Conservative	Windrum A.	1,232		
Alliance	Blackburn M.	683	28.2	+28.2
Alliance	Hart G.	629		
Labour	Lamb P.	434	17.9	−19.9
Labour	Shopland E.	391		
Turnout			49.7	
Conservative hold		Swing		
Conservative hold		Swing		
Conservative hold		Swing		

=== Forest ===
Forest
Party	Candidate	Votes	%	±%
Conservative	Miller E.	1,331	47.2	−14.3
Conservative	Mauchel E.	1,293		
Conservative	Sheppard A.	1,164		
Alliance	Velate T.	895	31.8	+31.8
Labour	Harris J.	591	21.0	−17.5
Labour	Oggerby G.	562		
Turnout			49.4	
Conservative hold		Swing		
Conservative hold		Swing		
Conservative hold		Swing		

=== Henfield ===
Henfield
Party	Candidate	Votes	%	±%
Independent	Jones K.	1,344	47.4	+1.9
Independent	Corp G.	1,325	46.7	+16.0
Labour	Allen C.	166	5.9	+5.9
Labour	Vinnicombe K.	118		
Turnout			34.6	
Independent gain from RA		Swing		
Independent hold		Swing		

Jones K. was elected in Henfield as a Residents' association member in 1979, when this seat was last contested. The change of his vote share has been included.

=== Itchingfield & Shipley ===
Itchingfield & Shipley
Party	Candidate	Votes	%	±%
Conservative	Keen D.	Unopposed		
Turnout			N/A	
Conservative hold		Swing		

=== Nuthurst ===
Nuthurst
Party	Candidate	Votes	%	±%
Conservative	Walker L. Ms.	Unopposed		
Turnout			N/A	
Conservative hold		Swing		

=== Pulborough & Coldwatham ===
Pulborough & Coldwatham
Party	Candidate	Votes	%	±%
Conservative	Gocher A.	1,157	81.0	+7.3
Conservative	Barber T.	1,086		
Alliance	Gillooly B.	271	19.0	+19.9
Turnout			35.8	
Conservative hold		Swing		
Conservative hold		Swing		

=== Riverside ===
Riverside
Party	Candidate	Votes	%	±%
Conservative	Watson B.	1,204	39.7	−17.4
Conservative	Roberts W.	1,194		
Conservative	Link C.	1,158		
Alliance	Bowles V.	834	27.5	+27.5
Alliance	Moore F.	736		
Labour	Thurston J.	683	22.5	−20.4
Labour	Street M.	590		
Ind. Conservative	Francis R.	313	10.3	+10.3
Turnout			47.5	
Conservative hold		Swing		
Conservative hold		Swing		
Conservative hold		Swing		

=== Roffey ===
Roffey
Party	Candidate	Votes	%	±%
Conservative	Hilliard D.	1,666	51.7	+9.5
Conservative	Waller J.	1,624		
Conservative	Godwin G.	1,607		
Alliance	Lawrence K.	917	28.4	+28.4
Labour	McMillan A.	642	19.9	−2.8
Turnout			40.5	
Conservative hold		Swing		
Conservative hold		Swing		
Conservative gain from Independent		Swing		

=== Rudgwick ===
Rudgwick
Party	Candidate	Votes	%	±%
Independent	Henderson P. Ms.	Unopposed		
Turnout			N/A	
Independent hold		Swing		

=== Rusper ===
Rusper
Party	Candidate	Votes	%	±%
Conservative	Phelps A.	Unopposed		
Turnout			N/A	
Conservative hold		Swing		

=== Slinfold ===
Slinfold
Party	Candidate	Votes	%	±%
Conservative	Maydwell R.	352	52.3	−10.6
Alliance	Dick B.	321	47.7	+47.7
Turnout			49.9	
Conservative hold		Swing		

=== Southwater ===
Southwater
Party	Candidate	Votes	%	±%
Conservative	Driver J.	1,001	65.0	
Conservative	Albrecht A.	945		
Alliance	Scott V.	539	35.0	
Turnout			42.7	
Conservative hold		Swing		
Conservative hold		Swing		

=== Steyning ===
Steyning
Party	Candidate	Votes	%	±%
Conservative	Honeywood M. Ms.	1,039	53.7	+17.4
Conservative	Ward M. Ms.	810		
Alliance	Williams C.	606	31.3	+3.8
Ecology	Battson S.	161	8.3	+8.3
Labour	McGregor N.	129	6.7	+6.7
Labour	Greenland A.	122		
Turnout			54.8	
Conservative hold		Swing		
Conservative gain from Independent		Swing		

=== Storrington ===
Storrington
Party	Candidate	Votes	%	±%
Conservative	Shepherd F.	1,316	65.7	+1.3
Conservative	Tunnell R.	1,109		
Alliance	Macdonald C.	688	34.3	−1.3
Turnout			49.9	
Conservative hold		Swing		
Conservative hold		Swing		

=== Sullington ===
Sullington
Party	Candidate	Votes	%	±%
Conservative	Field B.	452	41.0	−16.8
Independent	Bazire P.	313	28.4	+28.4
Alliance	Dean P.	225	20.4	−21.8
Ind. Conservative	Armour-Milne J.	112	10.2	+10.2
Turnout			62.0	
Conservative hold		Swing		

=== Trafalgar ===
Trafalgar
Party	Candidate	Votes	%	±%
Conservative	Hollins J.	1,210	34.2	−6.8
Independent	Parsons S.	1,181	33.4	−2.8
Conservative	Walters J.	1,158		
Alliance	Smith J. Ms.	781	22.1	+22.1
Alliance	Pearce T.	697		
Labour	Barwood J.	366	10.3	−12.5
Turnout			79.1	
Conservative hold		Swing		
Independent hold		Swing		
Conservative hold		Swing		

=== Warnham ===
Warnham
Party	Candidate	Votes	%	±%
Conservative	Burnham J. Ms.	491	66.5	+6.1
Labour	Simon T.	125	16.9	−22.7
Alliance	Crosbie L.	122	16.5	+16.5
Turnout			53.6	
Conservative hold		Swing		

=== West Chiltington ===
West Chiltington
Party	Candidate	Votes	%	±%
Conservative	Dolphin C.	710	82.8	
Alliance	Cleaver M. Ms.	147	17.2	
Turnout			49.1	
Conservative hold		Swing		

=== West Grinstead ===
West Grinstead
Party	Candidate	Votes	%	±%
Conservative	Hanley J.	538	66.1	
Alliance	Callard P.	276	33.9	
Turnout			43.3	
Conservative gain from Independent		Swing		
