= 2003 Horsham District Council election =

2003 UK local government election

- 1 May 2003

All 44 seats to Horsham District Council 23 seats needed for a majority
| | First party | Second party | Third party |
|---|---|---|---|
| Party | Conservative | Liberal Democrats | Independent |
| Seats won | 22 | 20 | 2 |
| Seat change | ▲1 | ▲8 | ▼1 |
- Results of the 2003 Horsham District Council election

The 2003 Horsham District Council election took place on 1 May 2003 to elect members of Horsham District Council in England. It was held on the same day as other local elections. The result left the council with no overall control with the Conservatives one seat short of a majority.

== Council Composition ==
Prior to the election, the composition of the council was:

↓
| 21 | 12 | 3 |
| Con | LDem | Ind |

After the election, the composition of the council was:

↓
| 22 | 20 | 2 |
| Con | LDem | Ind |

== Results summary ==
2003 Horsham District Council election
| Party | Seats | Gains | Losses | Net gain/loss | Seats % | Votes % | Votes | +/− |
|---|---|---|---|---|---|---|---|---|
| Conservative | 22 | | | ▲1 | 51.1 | 47.5 | 32,264 | -3.0 |
| Liberal Democrats | 20 | | | ▲8 | 46.5 | 42.3 | 28,707 | +4.6 |
| Independent | 2 | | | ▼1 | 4.7 | 6.9 | 4,652 | +2.1 |
| Labour | 0 | | | Steady | 0.0 | 3.2 | 2,164 | -3.9 |
| UKIP | 0 | | | Steady | 0.0 | 0.2 | 112 | +0.2 |

== Ward results ==
=== Billingshurst and Shipley ===
Billingshurst and Shipley
| Party | Candidate | Votes | % | ±% |
|---|---|---|---|---|
| Conservative | Sheila van den Bergh | 830 | 36.7 | |
| Conservative | Gordon Lindsay | 751 | | |
| Liberal Democrats | Geoffrey Lawes | 736 | 32.5 | |
| Conservative | David Fisher | 734 | | |
| Liberal Democrats | Ann Rodwell | 710 | | |
| Liberal Democrats | John Griffin | 604 | | |
| Independent | Douglas Rands | 500 | 22.1 | |
| Labour | Sally Morton | 197 | 8.7 | |
| Turnout | | | 29.0 | |
| Conservative win (new seat) | | | | |
| Conservative win (new seat) | | | | |
| Liberal Democrats win (new seat) | | | | |

=== Bramber, Upper Beeding and Woodmancote ===
Bramber, Upper Beeding and Woodmancote
| Party | Candidate | Votes | % | ±% |
|---|---|---|---|---|
| Conservative | Alan Fisher | 643 | 46.2 | |
| Liberal Democrats | John Hewitt | 640 | 46.0 | |
| Conservative | John Peake | 615 | | |
| Liberal Democrats | Stephan Shorey | 609 | | |
| Labour | Michael Neves | 108 | 7.8 | |
| Labour | Estelle Hilditch | 105 | | |
| Turnout | | | 33.0 | |
| Conservative win (new seat) | | | | |
| Liberal Democrats win (new seat) | | | | |

=== Broadbridge Heath ===
Broadbridge Heath
| Party | Candidate | Votes | % | ±% |
|---|---|---|---|---|
| Liberal Democrats | Sally Horner | 313 | 43.8 | −6.8 |
| Conservative | Peter Catchpole | 253 | 35.4 | +2.8 |
| Labour | Richard Wilson | 148 | 20.7 | +3.8 |
| Turnout | | | 30.4 | |
| Liberal Democrats hold | | Swing | | |

=== Chanctonbury ===
Chanctonbury
| Party | Candidate | Votes | % | ±% |
|---|---|---|---|---|
| Conservative | Alan Harris | 1,521 | 62.4 | −4.6 |
| Conservative | Michael Jackson | 1,501 | | |
| Conservative | Eric Jenkins | 1,410 | | |
| Independent | James Glasse | 517 | 21.2 | +21.2 |
| Liberal Democrats | Alan Sugarman | 400 | 16.4 | −16.6 |
| Liberal Democrats | Stephen Holbook | 388 | | |
| Liberal Democrats | Alan Hughes | 387 | | |
| Turnout | | | 35.1 | |
| Conservative hold | | Swing | | |
| Conservative hold | | Swing | | |
| Conservative win (new seat) | | | | |

=== Chantry ===
Chantry
| Party | Candidate | Votes | % | ±% |
|---|---|---|---|---|
| Conservative | Janet Tatum | 1,486 | 55.6 | |
| Conservative | Keith Ballard | 1,432 | | |
| Conservative | Neil Butler | 1,406 | | |
| Liberal Democrats | Douglas Banks | 1,188 | 44.4 | |
| Liberal Democrats | Maureen Girard | 996 | | |
| Liberal Democrats | Arthur Sullivan | 906 | | |
| Turnout | | | 35.2 | |
| Conservative win (new seat) | | | | |
| Conservative win (new seat) | | | | |
| Conservative win (new seat) | | | | |

=== Cowfold, Shermanbury and West Grinstead ===
Cowfold, Shermanbury and West Grinstead
| Party | Candidate | Votes | % | ±% |
|---|---|---|---|---|
| Conservative | Bernard Baldwin | 863 | 68.8 | |
| Conservative | Annette Harriesv | 746 | | |
| Liberal Democrats | Piers Pollard | 262 | 20.9 | |
| Liberal Democrats | Laurence Price | 248 | | |
| Labour | Josephine Battersby | 129 | 10.3 | |
| Turnout | | | 29.1 | |
| Conservative win (new seat) | | | | |
| Conservative win (new seat) | | | | |

=== Denne ===
Denne
| Party | Candidate | Votes | % | ±% |
|---|---|---|---|---|
| Liberal Democrats | David Sheldon | 703 | 49.3 | +9.0 |
| Liberal Democrats | William Parsonson | 631 | | |
| Conservative | Peter Tobutt | 600 | 42.1 | −5.5 |
| Conservative | John Charles | 579 | | |
| Labour | Terence Parker | 123 | 8.6 | −3.5 |
| Turnout | | | 32.9 | |
| Liberal Democrats gain from Conservative | | Swing | | |
| Liberal Democrats gain from Conservative | | Swing | | |

=== Forest ===
Forest
| Party | Candidate | Votes | % | ±% |
|---|---|---|---|---|
| Liberal Democrats | David Newman | 742 | 59.0 | +6.3 |
| Conservative | Evelyn Mauchel | 458 | 36.4 | −0.5 |
| Labour | Louise Skipton-Carter | 58 | 4.6 | −5.8 |
| Turnout | | | 44.4 | |
| Liberal Democrats hold | | Swing | | |

=== Henfield ===
Henfield
| Party | Candidate | Votes | % | ±% |
|---|---|---|---|---|
| Independent | Sheila Matthews | 925 | 49.7 | +12.9 |
| Conservative | Adam Reeves | 706 | 38.0 | −1.6 |
| Liberal Democrats | David Howard | 229 | 12.3 | +0.2 |
| Liberal Democrats | Thomas Pearce | 199 | | |
| Turnout | | | 32.0 | |
| Independent hold | | Swing | | |
| Conservative hold | | Swing | | |

=== Holbrook East ===
Holbrook East
| Party | Candidate | Votes | % | ±% |
|---|---|---|---|---|
| Conservative | Andrew Baldwin | 659 | 40.6 | |
| Liberal Democrats | Anthony Millson | 657 | 40.4 | |
| Conservative | Maria Bell | 523 | | |
| Liberal Democrats | Sheila Dale | 483 | | |
| Independent | James Rae | 201 | 12.4 | |
| Labour | Kathleen Goddard | 108 | 6.6 | |
| Turnout | | | 30.2 | |
| Conservative win (new seat) | | | | |
| Liberal Democrats win (new seat) | | | | |

=== Holbrook West ===
Holbrook West
| Party | Candidate | Votes | % | ±% |
|---|---|---|---|---|
| Conservative | Robert Nye | 657 | 39.3 | |
| Conservative | Christian Mitchell | 641 | | |
| Liberal Democrats | Jacqueline Powell | 637 | 38.1 | |
| Liberal Democrats | Anthony Hull | 618 | | |
| Independent | Peter Burgess | 238 | 14.2 | |
| Labour | Raymond Chapman | 139 | 8.3 | |
| Turnout | | | 32.6 | |
| Conservative win (new seat) | | | | |
| Conservative win (new seat) | | | | |

=== Horsham Park ===
Horsham Park
| Party | Candidate | Votes | % | ±% |
|---|---|---|---|---|
| Liberal Democrats | Pamela Clarke | 983 | 47.4 | |
| Liberal Democrats | David Holmes | 943 | | |
| Liberal Democrats | Peter Mullarky | 915 | | |
| Independent | Clive Burgess | 494 | 23.8 | |
| Conservative | Derek Bradnum | 398 | 19.2 | |
| Conservative | Nathanael Johansen-Allison | 379 | | |
| Conservative | Liz Ostacchini | 351 | | |
| Labour | Charlotte Morrissey | 197 | 9.5 | |
| Turnout | | | 27.9 | |
| Liberal Democrats win (new seat) | | | | |
| Liberal Democrats win (new seat) | | | | |
| Liberal Democrats win (new seat) | | | | |

=== Itchingfield, Slinfold and Warnham ===
Itchingfield, Slinfold and Warnham
| Party | Candidate | Votes | % | ±% |
|---|---|---|---|---|
| Conservative | Jean Burnham | 908 | 50.2 | |
| Liberal Democrats | Michael Dalrymple | 902 | 49.8 | |
| Conservative | Claire Vickers | 869 | | |
| Liberal Democrats | David Wright | 810 | | |
| Turnout | | | 44.0 | |
| Conservative win (new seat) | | | | |
| Liberal Democrats win (new seat) | | | | |

=== Nuthurst ===
Nuthurst
| Party | Candidate | Votes | % | ±% |
|---|---|---|---|---|
| Conservative | John Cox | 610 | 72.6 | −4.2 |
| Liberal Democrats | Nigel Sloan | 230 | 27.4 | +10.0 |
| Turnout | | | 35.6 | |
| Conservative hold | | Swing | | |

=== Pulborough and Coldwatham ===
Pulborough and Coldwatham
| Party | Candidate | Votes | % | ±% |
|---|---|---|---|---|
| Conservative | Brian Donnelly | 927 | 74.9 | +7.2 |
| Conservative | Roger Paterson | 923 | | |
| Liberal Democrats | Anthony Girard | 310 | 25.1 | +5.7 |
| Liberal Democrats | Rosalyn Deedman | 291 | | |
| Turnout | | | 28.7 | |
| Conservative hold | | Swing | | |
| Conservative hold | | Swing | | |

=== Roffey North ===
Roffey North
| Party | Candidate | Votes | % | ±% |
|---|---|---|---|---|
| Liberal Democrats | Barbara Price | 784 | 41.0 | −6.5 |
| Liberal Democrats | Jake Clausen | 743 | | |
| Conservative | Frank King | 642 | 33.6 | −7.8 |
| Conservative | Simon Torn | 629 | | |
| Independent | Liz Paffett | 174 | 9.1 | +9.1 |
| Labour | Matthew Stanley | 159 | 8.3 | −2.8 |
| Independent | Margaret Deane | 152 | 8.0 | +8.0 |
| Turnout | | | 33.5 | |
| Liberal Democrats hold | | Swing | | |
| Liberal Democrats hold | | Swing | | |

=== Roffey South ===
Roffey South
| Party | Candidate | Votes | % | ±% |
|---|---|---|---|---|
| Liberal Democrats | Pat Rutherford | 664 | 48.8 | |
| Liberal Democrats | Roger Wilton | 568 | | |
| Conservative | Andrew Strang | 364 | 26.7 | |
| Conservative | Jonathan Vickers | 326 | | |
| Independent | Peter Paffett | 237 | 17.4 | |
| Labour | Keith Maslin | 97 | 7.1 | |
| Turnout | | | 24.2 | |
| Liberal Democrats win (new seat) | | | | |
| Liberal Democrats win (new seat) | | | | |

=== Rudgwick ===
Rudgwick
| Party | Candidate | Votes | % | ±% |
|---|---|---|---|---|
| Conservative | John Bailey | 428 | 70.0 | −8.1 |
| Liberal Democrats | Michael Hendy | 183 | 30.0 | +14.2 |
| Turnout | | | 28.1 | |
| Conservative hold | | Swing | | |

=== Rusper and Colgate ===
Rusper and Colgate
| Party | Candidate | Votes | % | ±% |
|---|---|---|---|---|
| Conservative | Elizabeth Kitchen | 463 | 77.4 | |
| Liberal Democrats | Derek Brundish | 135 | 22.6 | |
| Turnout | | | 29.8 | |
| Conservative win (new seat) | | | | |

=== Southwater ===
Southwater
| Party | Candidate | Votes | % | ±% |
|---|---|---|---|---|
| Liberal Democrats | Peter Stainton | 1,232 | 51.7 | +16.0 |
| Liberal Democrats | Julie Stainton | 1,227 | | |
| Liberal Democrats | Barbara Varley | 1,205 | | |
| Conservative | Simon Hawkins | 971 | 40.8 | −13.8 |
| Conservative | Ian Howard | 966 | | |
| Conservative | Graham Dye | 938 | | |
| Labour | Christine Conibear | 179 | 7.5 | −2.2 |
| Turnout | | | 33.1 | |
| Liberal Democrats gain from Conservative | | Swing | | |
| Liberal Democrats gain from Conservative | | Swing | | |
| Liberal Democrats win (new seat) | | | | |

=== Steyning ===
Steyning
| Party | Candidate | Votes | % | ±% |
|---|---|---|---|---|
| Independent | George Cockman | 1,124 | 39.0 | −0.1 |
| Conservative | Margaret Lyth | 890 | 30.9 | +1.0 |
| Liberal Democrats | Susan Stokes | 624 | 21.7 | +0.1 |
| Liberal Democrats | Michael Twell | 433 | | |
| Labour | Valerie Neves | 131 | 4.5 | −4.9 |
| Labour | Peter Hilditch | 118 | | |
| UKIP | Lindsay Jupp | 112 | 3.9 | +3.9 |
| Turnout | | | 37.7 | |
| Independent hold | | Swing | | |
| Conservative hold | | Swing | | |

=== Trafalgar ===
Trafalgar
| Party | Candidate | Votes | % | ±% |
|---|---|---|---|---|
| Liberal Democrats | Christine Costin | 1,170 | 58.3 | +3.4 |
| Liberal Democrats | Leonard Crosbie | 1,069 | | |
| Conservative | Vivienne Tobutt | 670 | 33.4 | −1.5 |
| Conservative | Ian Strang | 598 | | |
| Labour | Elved Mainwaring | 168 | 8.4 | −1.8 |
| Turnout | | | 39.4 | |
| Liberal Democrats hold | | Swing | | |
| Liberal Democrats hold | | Swing | | |
