= 1987 Horsham District Council election =

1987 UK local government election

- 7 May 1987

All 43 seats to Horsham District Council 22 seats needed for a majority
| | First party | Second party | Third party |
|---|---|---|---|
| Party | Conservative | Alliance | Independent |
| Seats won | 33 | 6 | 4 |
| Seat change | ▼2 | ▲4 | ▼1 |

The 1987 Horsham District Council election took place on 7 May 1987 to elect members of Horsham District Council in England. It was held on the same day as other local elections. The Conservatives retained control of the council with 33 seats, a majority of 12. The SDP–Liberal Alliance won 6 seats and Independents won 4.

== Council Composition ==
Prior to the election, the composition of the council was:

↓
| 35 | 5 | 2 |
| Con | Ind | All |

After the election, the composition of the council was:

↓
| 33 | 6 | 4 |
| Con | All | Ind |

== Results summary ==
1987 Horsham District Council election
| Party | Seats | Gains | Losses | Net gain/loss | Seats % | Votes % | Votes | +/− |
|---|---|---|---|---|---|---|---|---|
| Conservative | 33 | - | - | ▼2 | 76.7 | 53.7 | 35,587 | -5.0 |
| Alliance | 6 | - | - | ▲4 | 14.0 | 30.1 | 19,930 | +9.2 |
| Independent | 4 | - | - | ▼1 | 9.3 | 5.5 | 3,640 | -3.4 |
| Labour | 0 | - | - | Steady | 0.0 | 7.8 | 5,198 | -1.5 |
| Green | 0 | - | - | Steady | 0.0 | 1.3 | 852 | +1.0 |
| RA | 0 | - | - | Steady | 0.0 | 1.1 | 757 | +1.1 |
| Ind. Conservative | 0 | - | - | Steady | 0.0 | 0.5 | 299 | -0.8 |

== Ward results ==
=== Billingshurst ===
Billingshurst
| Party | Candidate | Votes | % | ±% |
|---|---|---|---|---|
| Alliance | Bolden A. | 969 | 48.2 | +12.7 |
| Conservative | Van Den Bergh S. Ms | 928 | 46.2 | +13.8 |
| Conservative | Cartner G. | 802 | | |
| Alliance | Reynolds P. Ms. | 741 | | |
| Labour | Clout S. Ms. | 112 | 5.6 | +5.6 |
| Turnout | | | 43.2 | |
| Alliance hold | | Swing | | |
| Conservative hold | | Swing | | |

=== Bramber & Upper Beeding ===
Bramber & Upper Beeding
| Party | Candidate | Votes | % | ±% |
|---|---|---|---|---|
| Alliance | Campbell J. Ms. | 892 | 38.8 | −9.7 |
| Independent | Sanford L. | 851 | 37.0 | +0.9 |
| Conservative | Wright C. | 554 | 24.1 | +24.1 |
| Turnout | | | 42.8 | |
| Alliance hold | | Swing | | |
| Independent hold | | Swing | | |

=== Broadbridge Heath ===
Broadbridge Heath
| Party | Candidate | Votes | % | ±% |
|---|---|---|---|---|
| Conservative | McGregor R. | 514 | 47.1 | −5.4 |
| Alliance | Horner S. Ms. | 503 | 46.1 | +23.0 |
| Labour | Thomas B. | 75 | 6.9 | −17.5 |
| Turnout | | | 52.1 | |
| Conservative hold | | Swing | | |

=== Chanctonbury ===
Chanctonbury
| Party | Candidate | Votes | % | ±% |
|---|---|---|---|---|
| Conservative | Burningham J. | 1,006 | 62.5 | −5.2 |
| Conservative | Jenkins E. | 903 | | |
| Alliance | Hughes A. | 604 | 37.5 | +12.4 |
| Alliance | Jeffs P. Ms. | 597 | | |
| Turnout | | | 47.1 | |
| Conservative hold | | Swing | | |
| Conservative hold | | Swing | | |

=== Cowfold ===
Cowfold
| Party | Candidate | Votes | % | ±% |
|---|---|---|---|---|
| Conservative | Wedd R. | 462 | 60.7 | |
| Ind. Conservative | Ogg G. | 299 | 39.3 | |
| Turnout | | | 41.3 | |
| Conservative hold | | Swing | | |

=== Denne ===
Denne
| Party | Candidate | Votes | % | ±% |
|---|---|---|---|---|
| Conservative | Palmer B. Ms. | 1,558 | 55.5 | +1.7 |
| Conservative | Billington P. | 1,478 | | |
| Conservative | Pinion G. | 1,397 | | |
| Alliance | Farmer D. | 865 | 30.8 | +2.6 |
| Labour | Shopland E. | 386 | 13.7 | −4.2 |
| Labour | Thurston J. Ms. | 357 | | |
| Labour | Spottiswoode J. Ms. | 351 | | |
| Turnout | | | 47.7 | |
| Conservative hold | | Swing | | |
| Conservative hold | | Swing | | |
| Conservative hold | | Swing | | |

=== Forest ===
Forest
| Party | Candidate | Votes | % | ±% |
|---|---|---|---|---|
| Conservative | Mauchel E. Ms. | 1,198 | 51.1 | +3.9 |
| Conservative | Lynn D. | 1,131 | | |
| Conservative | Crooks H. Ms. | 1,092 | | |
| Alliance | Scott G. | 815 | 34.8 | +3.0 |
| Alliance | Newton S. | 780 | | |
| Labour | McMillan A. | 331 | 14.1 | −6.9 |
| Turnout | | | 42.9 | |
| Conservative hold | | Swing | | |
| Conservative hold | | Swing | | |
| Conservative hold | | Swing | | |

=== Henfield ===
Henfield
| Party | Candidate | Votes | % | ±% |
|---|---|---|---|---|
| Independent | Corp G. | 1,060 | 28.7 | −18.0 |
| Conservative | Howard M. | 1,022 | 27.7 | +27.7 |
| Green | Emmott S. | 852 | 23.1 | +23.1 |
| RA | Armour-Milne J. | 757 | 20.5 | +20.5 |
| Turnout | | | 47.7 | |
| Independent hold | | Swing | | |
| Conservative gain from Independent | | Swing | | |

=== Holbrook ===
Holbrook
| Party | Candidate | Votes | % | ±% |
|---|---|---|---|---|
| Conservative | Lancaster E. Ms. | 870 | 49.3 | |
| Conservative | Godwin G. | 836 | | |
| Alliance | Shields N. | 589 | 33.4 | |
| Labour | Lamb H. Ms. | 307 | 17.4 | |
| Turnout | | | 34.7 | |
| Conservative win (new seat) | | | | |
| Conservative win (new seat) | | | | |

=== Itchingfield & Shipley ===
Itchingfield & Shipley
| Party | Candidate | Votes | % | ±% |
|---|---|---|---|---|
| Conservative | Keen D. | 604 | 66.4 | |
| Alliance | Cadwell E. Ms. | 305 | 33.6 | |
| Turnout | | | 46.9 | |
| Conservative hold | | Swing | | |

=== Nuthurst ===
Nuthurst
| Party | Candidate | Votes | % | ±% |
|---|---|---|---|---|
| Conservative | Walker L. Ms. | Unopposed | | |
| Turnout | | | N/A | |
| Conservative hold | | Swing | | |

=== Pulborough & Coldwatham ===
Pulborough & Coldwatham
| Party | Candidate | Votes | % | ±% |
|---|---|---|---|---|
| Conservative | Barber D. | 1,136 | 64.1 | −16.9 |
| Conservative | Warner M. | 932 | | |
| Alliance | Wojewodzka F. Ms. | 635 | 35.9 | +16.9 |
| Turnout | | | 42.6 | |
| Conservative hold | | Swing | | |
| Conservative hold | | Swing | | |

=== Riverside ===
Riverside
| Party | Candidate | Votes | % | ±% |
|---|---|---|---|---|
| Conservative | Budd R. | 1,220 | 42.2 | +2.5 |
| Conservative | Watson B. | 1,215 | | |
| Alliance | Parminter K. Ms. | 1,206 | 41.7 | +14.2 |
| Conservative | Sheppard A. | 1,180 | | |
| Alliance | Fletcher M. | 1,136 | | |
| Alliance | Smithson J. Ms. | 1,084 | | |
| Labour | Barrett D. | 464 | 16.1 | −6.4 |
| Labour | Morris G. | 379 | | |
| Labour | Street M. | 369 | | |
| Turnout | | | 46.6 | |
| Conservative hold | | Swing | | |
| Conservative hold | | Swing | | |
| Alliance gain from Conservative | | Swing | | |

=== Roffey North ===
Roffey North
| Party | Candidate | Votes | % | ±% |
|---|---|---|---|---|
| Conservative | Hilliard D. | 957 | 46.8 | |
| Conservative | Mason D. | 839 | | |
| Alliance | Owen E. | 763 | 37.3 | |
| Alliance | Prodger T. | 715 | | |
| Labour | Lamb P. | 327 | 16.0 | |
| Labour | Lambirth A. | 266 | | |
| Turnout | | | 44.2 | |
| Conservative win (new seat) | | | | |
| Conservative win (new seat) | | | | |

=== Rudgwick ===
Rudgwick
| Party | Candidate | Votes | % | ±% |
|---|---|---|---|---|
| Independent | Henderson P. Ms. | Unopposed | | |
| Turnout | | | N/A | |
| Independent hold | | Swing | | |

=== Rusper ===
Rusper
| Party | Candidate | Votes | % | ±% |
|---|---|---|---|---|
| Conservative | Kitchen E. Ms. | Unopposed | | |
| Turnout | | | N/A | |
| Conservative hold | | Swing | | |

=== Slinfold ===
Slinfold
| Party | Candidate | Votes | % | ±% |
|---|---|---|---|---|
| Conservative | Banks D. | 314 | 48.2 | −4.1 |
| Independent | Sherwin-Smith H. Ms. | 292 | 44.8 | +44.8 |
| Labour | King C. Ms. | 46 | 7.1 | +7.1 |
| Turnout | | | 50.0 | |
| Conservative hold | | Swing | | |

=== Southwater ===
Southwater
| Party | Candidate | Votes | % | ±% |
|---|---|---|---|---|
| Alliance | Stainton J. Ms. | 1,094 | 53.6 | +18.6 |
| Alliance | Stainton P. | 921 | | |
| Conservative | Harrison R. | 843 | 41.3 | −23.7 |
| Conservative | Windrum A. | 752 | | |
| Labour | Pope P. Ms. | 104 | 5.1 | +5.1 |
| Turnout | | | 48.5 | |
| Alliance gain from Conservative | | Swing | | |
| Alliance gain from Conservative | | Swing | | |

=== Steyning ===
Steyning
| Party | Candidate | Votes | % | ±% |
|---|---|---|---|---|
| Conservative | Ward M. Ms. | 912 | 28.9 | −24.8 |
| Independent | Millman R. | 770 | 24.4 | +24.4 |
| Independent | Lawrie G. | 667 | 21.1 | +21.1 |
| Alliance | Neves V. Ms. | 589 | 18.7 | −12.4 |
| Alliance | Taylor F. | 586 | | |
| Labour | Drew D. | 218 | 6.9 | +0.2 |
| Turnout | | | 48.7 | |
| Conservative hold | | Swing | | |
| Independent gain from Conservative | | Swing | | |

=== Storrington ===
Storrington
| Party | Candidate | Votes | % | ±% |
|---|---|---|---|---|
| Conservative | Hyde M. | 1,120 | 62.2 | −3.5 |
| Conservative | Phillips N. | 1,022 | | |
| Alliance | Walker L. | 553 | 30.7 | −3.6 |
| Alliance | Bhabra J. | 543 | | |
| Labour | Syred W. Ms. | 129 | 7.2 | +7.2 |
| Turnout | | | 46.2 | |
| Conservative hold | | Swing | | |
| Conservative hold | | Swing | | |

=== Sullington ===
Sullington
| Party | Candidate | Votes | % | ±% |
|---|---|---|---|---|
| Alliance | Banks D. | 610 | 56.0 | +35.6 |
| Conservative | Pope J. | 465 | 42.7 | +1.7 |
| Labour | Allen R. | 14 | 1.3 | +1.3 |
| Turnout | | | 64.8 | |
| Alliance gain from Conservative | | Swing | | |

=== Trafalgar ===
Trafalgar
| Party | Candidate | Votes | % | ±% |
|---|---|---|---|---|
| Conservative | Smith J. Ms. | 1,423 | 52.5 | +18.3 |
| Conservative | Walters J. | 1,409 | | |
| Conservative | Hollins J. | 1,294 | | |
| Alliance | Salt J. | 817 | 30.1 | +8.0 |
| Labour | Brady E. | 472 | 17.4 | +7.1 |
| Labour | Wakeford S. | 461 | | |
| Turnout | | | 50.8 | |
| Conservative hold | | Swing | | |
| Conservative gain from Independent | | Swing | | |
| Conservative hold | | Swing | | |

=== Warnham ===
Warnham
| Party | Candidate | Votes | % | ±% |
|---|---|---|---|---|
| Conservative | Burham J. Ms. | 534 | 62.3 | −4.2 |
| Alliance | Dick G. | 293 | 34.2 | +17.7 |
| Labour | Burstow D. Ms. | 30 | 3.5 | −13.4 |
| Turnout | | | 61.3 | |
| Conservative hold | | Swing | | |

=== West Chiltington ===
West Chiltington
| Party | Candidate | Votes | % | ±% |
|---|---|---|---|---|
| Conservative | Dolphin C. | 962 | 70.6 | −12.2 |
| Alliance | De'Ath G. Ms. | 400 | 29.4 | +12.2 |
| Turnout | | | 55.0 | |
| Conservative hold | | Swing | | |

=== West Grinstead ===
West Grinstead
| Party | Candidate | Votes | % | ±% |
|---|---|---|---|---|
| Conservative | McKenzie E. Ms. | 703 | 68.4 | +2.3 |
| Alliance | Reynolds G. | 325 | 31.6 | −2.3 |
| Turnout | | | 51.6 | |
| Conservative hold | | Swing | | |
