= 2007 Horsham District Council election =

2007 UK local government election

- 3 May 2007

All 44 seats to Horsham District Council 23 seats needed for a majority
	First party	Second party	Third party
Party	Conservative	Liberal Democrats	Independent
Seats won	31	11	2
Seat change	▲9	▼9	Steady
- Results of the 2007 Horsham District Council election

The 2007 Horsham District Council election took place on 3 May 2007 to elect members of Horsham District Council in England. It was held on the same day as other local elections. The Conservatives won a majority on the council, gaining from no overall control.

== Council composition ==
Prior to the election, the composition of the council was:

↓
22	20	2
Con	LDem	Ind

After the election, the composition of the council was:

↓
31	11	2
Con	LDem	Ind

== Results summary ==
2007 Horsham District Council election
Party	Seats	Gains	Losses	Net gain/loss	Seats %	Votes %	Votes	+/−
Conservative	31	9	0	▲9	70.5	54.3	42,736	+6.8
Liberal Democrats	11	0	9	▼9	25.0	36.8	28,984	-5.5
Independent	2	-	-	Steady	4.5	3.2	2,500	-3.7
UKIP	0	-	-	Steady	0.0	2.9	2,297	+2.7
Labour	0	-	-	Steady	0.0	1.6	1,217	-1.6
BNP	0	-	-	Steady	0.0	0.5	420	+0.5
Green	0	-	-	Steady	0.0	0.3	262	+0.3
Peace	0	-	-	Steady	0.0	0.3	226	+0.3
English Democrat	0	-	-	Steady	0.0	0.2	126	+0.2

== Ward results ==
=== Billingshurst and Shipley ===
Billingshurst and Shipley
Party	Candidate	Votes	%	±%
Conservative	Sheila van den Bergh	1,311	47.9	+11.2
Conservative	Peggy Davies	1,307		
Conservative	Gordon Lindsay	1,253		
Liberal Democrats	John Griffin	945	34.5	+2.0
Liberal Democrats	Patrick Perks	931		
Liberal Democrats	David Wright	781		
UKIP	Doug Rands	480	17.5	+17.5
UKIP	Mike Bobker	439		
UKIP	Harry Aldridge	358		
Turnout			37.4	
Conservative hold		Swing		
Conservative hold		Swing		
Conservative gain from Liberal Democrats		Swing		

=== Bramber, Upper Beeding and Woodmancote ===
Bramber, Upper Beeding and Woodmancote
Party	Candidate	Votes	%	±%
Conservative	Alan Fisher	905	48.5	
Conservative	Frank Grantham	861		
Liberal Democrats	Andrew Purches	842	45.1	
Liberal Democrats	Marian Brown	738		
Labour	Valerie Neves	119	6.4	
Turnout			43.0	
Conservative hold		Swing		
Conservative gain from Liberal Democrats		Swing		

=== Broadbridge Heath ===
Broadbridge Heath
Party	Candidate	Votes	%	±%
Liberal Democrats	Sally Horner	490	63.9	+20.1
Conservative	Liz Ostacchini	277	36.1	+0.7
Turnout			37.4	
Liberal Democrats hold		Swing		

=== Chanctonbury ===
Chanctonbury
Party	Candidate	Votes	%	±%
Conservative	Philip Circus	1,673	64.7	+2.3
Conservative	Roger Arthur	1,658		
Conservative	David Jenkins	1,601		
Liberal Democrats	Stephen Holbrook	567	21.9	+5.5
UKIP	Peter Westrip	347	13.4	+13.4
Turnout			40.5	
Conservative hold		Swing		
Conservative hold		Swing		
Conservative hold		Swing		

=== Chantry ===
Chantry
Party	Candidate	Votes	%	±%
Conservative	Ray Dawe	1,131	58.8	+3.2
Conservative	Chris Mason	1,063		
Conservative	Jim Sanson	1,046		
Liberal Democrats	Richard Martin	467	24.3	−20.1
Liberal Democrats	Norman Cooper	434		
UKIP	John Wallace	326	16.9	+16.9
Turnout			42.6	
Conservative hold		Swing		
Conservative hold		Swing		
Conservative hold		Swing		

=== Cowfold, Shermanbury and West Grinstead ===
Cowfold, Shermanbury and West Grinstead
Party	Candidate	Votes	%	±%
Conservative	Ian Shepherd	1,131	74.2	+5.4
Conservative	Jonathan Chowen	1,124		
Liberal Democrats	Susan Stokes	394	25.8	+4.9
Turnout			37.6	
Conservative hold		Swing		
Conservative hold		Swing		

=== Denne ===
Denne
Party	Candidate	Votes	%	±%
Liberal Democrats	David Sheldon	729	48.5	−0.8
Liberal Democrats	Sheila Dale	701		
Conservative	Clare Norriss	529	35.2	−6.9
Conservative	Ronald Vimpany	474		
BNP	Richard Trower	157	10.4	+10.4
Labour	Jane Field	88	5.9	−2.7
Labour	Nicholas Field	76		
Turnout			41.1	
Liberal Democrats hold		Swing		
Liberal Democrats hold		Swing		

=== Forest ===
Forest
Party	Candidate	Votes	%	±%
Conservative	Gordon Brown	726	48.6	+12.2
Liberal Democrats	Godfrey Newman	713	47.7	−11.3
Labour	Louise Skipton-Carter	56	3.7	−0.9
Turnout			53.6	
Conservative gain from Liberal Democrats		Swing		

=== Henfield ===
Henfield
Party	Candidate	Votes	%	±%
Independent	Sheila Matthews	989	41.9	−7.8
Conservative	Keith Wilkins	873	37.0	−1.0
Conservative	Caroline Clarke	814		
Liberal Democrats	Andrew Sharp	498	21.1	+8.8
Turnout			43.0	
Independent hold		Swing		
Conservative hold		Swing		

=== Holbrook East ===
Holbrook East
Party	Candidate	Votes	%	±%
Conservative	Andrew Baldwin	1,090	56.3	+15.7
Conservative	Linda Pettitt	991		
Liberal Democrats	Tony Millson	719	37.2	−3.2
Liberal Democrats	Nick Chamberlain	585		
English Democrat	William Cobbett	126	6.5	+6.5
Turnout			42.0	
Conservative hold		Swing		
Conservative gain from Liberal Democrats		Swing		

=== Holbrook West ===
Holbrook West
Party	Candidate	Votes	%	±%
Conservative	Christian Mitchell	1,018	46.9	+7.6
Conservative	Roger Edworthy	959		
Liberal Democrats	Tony Rickett	712	32.8	−5.3
Liberal Democrats	Belinda Walters	698		
Independent	Peter Burgess	361	16.6	+2.4
Labour	Raymond Chapman	78	3.6	−4.7
Turnout			46.8	
Conservative hold		Swing		
Conservative hold		Swing		

=== Horsham Park ===
Horsham Park
Party	Candidate	Votes	%	±%
Liberal Democrats	David Holmes	1,132	48.8	+1.4
Liberal Democrats	Clive Burgess	1,099		
Liberal Democrats	Kyle Wickens	944		
Conservative	Alex Kirke	668	28.8	+9.6
Conservative	Jonathan Vickers	626		
Conservative	Matt Taylor	615		
Labour	Jonathan Austin	294	12.7	+3.2
Peace	Jim Duggan	226	9.7	+9.7
Turnout			25.3	
Liberal Democrats hold		Swing		
Liberal Democrats hold		Swing		
Liberal Democrats hold		Swing		

=== Itchingfield, Slinfold and Warnham ===
Itchingfield, Slinfold and Warnham
Party	Candidate	Votes	%	±%
Conservative	Peter Rowlinson	1,088	52.3	+2.1
Conservative	Robert Nye	1,082		
Liberal Democrats	Michael Dalrymple	772	37.1	−12.7
Liberal Democrats	Sally Pavey	673		
UKIP	Stuart Aldridge	220	10.6	+10.6
Turnout			47.0	
Conservative hold		Swing		
Conservative gain from Liberal Democrats		Swing		

=== Nuthurst ===
Nuthurst
Party	Candidate	Votes	%	±%
Conservative	John Cox	752	73.4	+0.8
Liberal Democrats	Jay Mercer	188	18.3	−9.1
Green	Tristan Loraine	85	8.3	+8.3
Turnout			45.3	
Conservative hold		Swing		

=== Pulborough and Coldwatham ===
Pulborough and Coldwatham
Party	Candidate	Votes	%	±%
Conservative	Brian Donnelly	1,154	76.7	+1.8
Conservative	Roger Paterson	1,125		
Liberal Democrats	Maureen Girard	351	23.3	−1.8
Liberal Democrats	Robert Margrett	318		
Turnout			34.2	
Conservative hold		Swing		
Conservative hold		Swing		

=== Roffey North ===
Roffey North
Party	Candidate	Votes	%	±%
Liberal Democrats	David Skipp	1,194	52.9	+11.9
Liberal Democrats	Sarah Gray	1,073		
Conservative	John Charles	798	35.4	+1.8
Conservative	Simon Torn	771		
BNP	Donna Bailey	263	11.7	+11.7
Turnout			45.5	
Liberal Democrats hold		Swing		
Liberal Democrats hold		Swing		

=== Roffey South ===
Roffey South
Party	Candidate	Votes	%	±%
Conservative	Roy Cornell	716	45.4	+18.7
Liberal Democrats	Pat Rutherford	693	43.9	−4.9
Conservative	Nicholas Lowson	676		
Liberal Democrats	Roger Wilton	610		
Labour	John Thomas	168	10.7	+3.6
Turnout			32.6	
Conservative gain from Liberal Democrats		Swing		
Liberal Democrats hold		Swing		

=== Rudgwick ===
Rudgwick
Party	Candidate	Votes	%	±%
Conservative	John Bailey	640	76.7	+6.7
Liberal Democrats	Laurence Price	162	19.4	−10.6
Labour	Christine Conibear	33	4.0	+4.0
Turnout			39.9	
Conservative hold		Swing		

=== Rusper and Colgate ===
Rusper and Colgate
Party	Candidate	Votes	%	±%
Conservative	Liz Kitchen	585	75.5	−1.9
Liberal Democrats	Derek Brundish	108	13.9	−8.7
Independent	Dudley Thompson	82	10.6	+10.6
Turnout			38.1	
Conservative hold		Swing		

=== Southwater ===
Southwater
Party	Candidate	Votes	%	±%
Conservative	Ian Howard	1,575	54.6	+13.8
Conservative	Claire Vickers	1,433		
Conservative	Ross Dye	1,405		
Liberal Democrats	Peter Stainton	1,312	45.4	−6.3
Liberal Democrats	Barbara Varley	1,265		
Liberal Democrats	Garry Jennings	1,195		
Turnout			41.0	
Conservative gain from Liberal Democrats		Swing		
Conservative gain from Liberal Democrats		Swing		
Conservative gain from Liberal Democrats		Swing		

=== Steyning ===
Steyning
Party	Candidate	Votes	%	±%
Conservative	Leonard Warner	1,110	33.3	+2.4
Independent	George Cockman	1,068	32.0	−7.0
Liberal Democrats	Derek Deedman	988	29.6	+7.9
Conservative	Michael Willett	812		
Liberal Democrats	Ros Deedman	515		
Labour	Sarah Brookes	167	5.0	+0.5
Turnout			49.1	
Conservative hold		Swing		
Independent hold		Swing		

=== Trafalgar ===
Trafalgar
Party	Candidate	Votes	%	±%
Liberal Democrats	Christine Costin	1,264	53.5	−4.8
Liberal Democrats	Leonard Crosbie	1,184		
Conservative	Paul Brown	655	27.7	−5.7
Conservative	Marc Kent	635		
Green	Stacey Frier	177	7.5	+7.5
Labour	Alexandra Davis	138	5.8	−2.6
UKIP	Claire Bridewell	127	5.3	+5.3
Turnout			45.2	
Liberal Democrats hold		Swing		
Liberal Democrats hold		Swing		
