= 1979 Horsham District Council election =

1979 UK local government election

- 7 May 1979

All 43 seats to Horsham District Council 22 seats needed for a majority
	First party	Second party	Third party
Party	Conservative	Independent	Liberal
Seats won	33	8	1
Seat change	▲3	▼4	▲1
	Fourth party
Party	RA
Seats won	1
Seat change	Steady

The 1979 Horsham District Council election took place on 3 May 1979 to elect members of Horsham District Council in England. It was held on the same day as other local elections and the 1979 United Kingdom general election. The Conservatives retained control of the council with 33 seats, a majority of 12. The Independents had eight councillors elected, a decrease of three from last time. The Liberals gained a seat in Bramber & Upper Beeding and the Residents' association held on to their Henfield seat.

== Council composition ==
Prior to the election, the composition of the council was:

↓
30	12	1
Con	Ind	RA

After the election, the composition of the council was:

↓
33	8	1	1
Con	Ind	Lib	RA

== Results summary ==
1979 Horsham District Council election
Party	Seats	Gains	Losses	Net gain/loss	Seats %	Votes %	Votes	+/−
Conservative	33			▲3	76.7	60.6	46,817	+6.4
Independent	8			▼4	18.6	11.5	8,899	-8.8
Liberal	1			▲1	2.3	5.3	4,087	+0.5
RA	1			Steady	2.3	2.9	2,246	+0.5
Labour	0			Steady	0.0	17.9	13,862	-0.1
Other	0			Steady	0.0	1.7	1,368	-

== Ward results ==
=== Billingshurst ===
Billingshurst
Party	Candidate	Votes	%	±%
Conservative	Linney C.	Unopposed		
Independent	Griffin C.	Unopposed		
Turnout			N/A	
Conservative hold		Swing		
Independent hold		Swing		

=== Bramber & Upper Beeding ===
Bramber & Upper Beeding
Party	Candidate	Votes	%	±%
Liberal	Campbell J. Ms.	1,658	42.1	+24.2
Independent	Sanford L.	1,218	30.9	−5.0
Conservative	Goss P. Ms.	1,061	26.9	−19.3
Conservative	Wright C.	1,007		
Turnout			77.4	
Liberal gain from Conservative		Swing		
Independent hold		Swing		

=== Broadbridge Heath ===
Broadbridge Heath
Party	Candidate	Votes	%	±%
Conservative	McGregor R.	762	59.3	
Labour	Lamb H. Ms.	522	40.7	
Turnout			80.8	
Conservative hold		Swing		

=== Chanctonbury ===
Chanctonbury
Party	Candidate	Votes	%	±%
Conservative	Brazier F.	Unopposed		
Conservative	Jenkins E.	Unopposed		
Turnout			N/A	
Conservative win (new seat)				
Conservative win (new seat)				

=== Cowfold ===
Cowfold
Party	Candidate	Votes	%	±%
Conservative	Fowler S.	Unopposed		
Turnout			N/A	
Conservative gain from Independent		Swing		

Fowler S. was elected unopposed in Cowfold as an independent in 1976, when this seat was last contested.

=== Denne ===
Denne
Party	Candidate	Votes	%	±%
Conservative	Pinion G.	2,022	62.2	
Conservative	Windrum A.	2,013		
Conservative	Berkley P. Ms.	2,008		
Labour	Lyons J.	1,231	37.8	
Turnout			79.9	
Conservative win (new seat)				
Conservative win (new seat)				
Conservative win (new seat)				

=== Forest ===
Forest
Party	Candidate	Votes	%	±%
Conservative	Miller E.	2,507	61.5	
Conservative	Taylor J.	2,416		
Conservative	Sheppard A.	2,269		
Labour	Battersby R.	1,572	38.5	
Labour	Lamb P.	1,473		
Labour	Nevins R.	1,404		
Turnout				
Conservative win (new seat)				
Conservative win (new seat)				
Conservative win (new seat)				

=== Henfield ===
Henfield
Party	Candidate	Votes	%	±%
RA	Jones K.	2,246	45.5	+14.8
Independent	Corp G.	1,517	30.7	+30.7
Conservative	Jones T.	1,173	23.8	−6.2
Turnout			74.7	
RA hold		Swing		
Independent gain from Conservative		Swing		

Corp G. was elected in Henfield as a Conservative in 1976, when this seat was last contested.

=== Itchingfield & Shipley ===
Itchingfield & Shipley
Party	Candidate	Votes	%	±%
Conservative	Keen D.	Unopposed		
Turnout			N/A	
Conservative win (new seat)				

Keen D. was elected unopposed in Shipley as an independent in 1976.

=== Nuthurst ===
Nuthurst
Party	Candidate	Votes	%	±%
Conservative	Mackenzie J.	Unopposed		
Turnout			N/A	
Conservative hold		Swing		

=== Pulborough & Coldwatham ===
Pulborough & Coldwatham
Party	Candidate	Votes	%	±%
Conservative	Cousins B.	2,080	73.7	
Conservative	Gocher H.	2,022		
	Bodman A.	742	26.3	
	Doyle M.	626		
Turnout			77.7	
Conservative hold		Swing		
Conservative hold		Swing		

=== Riverside ===
Riverside
Party	Candidate	Votes	%	±%
Conservative	Watson B.	2,614	57.1	
Conservative	Mauchel E. Ms.	2,401		
Conservative	Roberts W.	2,399		
Labour	Clements R.	1,964	42.9	
Turnout			77.7	
Conservative win (new seat)				
Conservative win (new seat)				
Conservative win (new seat)				

=== Roffey ===
Roffey
Party	Candidate	Votes	%	±%
Conservative	Bosanquet D.	2,336	42.2	−36.4
Conservative	Houghton I. Ms.	2,051		
Independent	Gue P. Ms.	1,949	35.2	+35.2
Conservative	Chick D.	1,850		
Labour	McMillan A.	1,255	22.7	+1.3
Labour	Ivatts J.	1,200		
Turnout			79.6	
Conservative hold		Swing		
Conservative hold		Swing		
Independent win (new seat)				

=== Rudgwick ===
Rudgwick
Party	Candidate	Votes	%	±%
Independent	Henderson P. Ms.	882	65.1	
Conservative	Taylor E. Ms.	473	34.9	
Turnout			79.6	
Independent hold		Swing		

=== Rusper ===
Rusper
Party	Candidate	Votes	%	±%
Conservative	Calvert H.	Unopposed		
Conservative	Phelps A. Ms.	Unopposed		
Turnout			N/A	
Conservative hold		Swing		
Conservative win (new seat)				

=== Slinfold ===
Slinfold
Party	Candidate	Votes	%	±%
Conservative	Maydwell R.	520	62.9	
Independent	Shields N.	307	37.1	
Turnout			80.8	
Conservative hold		Swing		

=== Southwater ===
Southwater
Party	Candidate	Votes	%	±%
Conservative	Albrecht R.	Unopposed		
Conservative	Charman M. Ms.	Unopposed		
Turnout			N/A	
Conservative gain from Independent		Swing		
Conservative gain from Independent		Swing		

Charman M. Ms. was elected unopposed as an independent in 1976, when this seat was last contested.

=== Steyning ===
Steyning
Party	Candidate	Votes	%	±%
Conservative	Honeywood M. Ms.	1,193	36.3	+14.6
Independent	Mimmack J.	1,190	36.2	+8.9
Conservative	Scott J.	929		
Liberal	Campbell J.	905	27.5	+17.1
Turnout			76.3	
Conservative gain from Independent		Swing		
Independent hold		Swing		

=== Storrington ===
Storrington
Party	Candidate	Votes	%	±%
Conservative	Shepherd F.	1,813	64.4	+14.8
Conservative	Tunnell R.	1,567		
Liberal	Wigg R.	1,003	35.6	+13.4
Turnout			74.4	
Conservative hold		Swing		
Conservative hold		Swing		

=== Sullington ===
Sullington
Party	Candidate	Votes	%	±%
Conservative	Armour-Milne J.	715	57.8	−1.0
Liberal	Dean P.	521	42.2	+1.0
Turnout			76.8	
Conservative hold		Swing		

=== Trafalgar ===
Trafalgar
Party	Candidate	Votes	%	±%
Conservative	Walters J.	2,081	41.0	
Conservative	West H. Ms.	1,871		
Independent	Parsons W.	1,836	36.2	
Labour	Evenden R.	1,155	22.8	
Labour	Thurston J. Ms.	906		
Labour	Shopland E.	744		
Turnout			82.2	
Conservative win (new seat)				
Conservative win (new seat)				
Independent win (new seat)				

=== Warnham ===
Warnham
Party	Candidate	Votes	%	±%
Conservative	Hodgson A.	664	60.4	−10.1
Labour	Ward G.	436	39.6	+10.1
Turnout			79.8	
Conservative hold		Swing		

=== West Chiltington ===
West Chiltington
Party	Candidate	Votes	%	±%
Conservative	Dolphin C.	Unopposed		
Turnout			N/A	
Conservative hold		Swing		

=== West Grinstead ===
West Grinstead
Party	Candidate	Votes	%	±%
Independent	Scragg J.	Unopposed		
Turnout			N/A	
Independent hold		Swing		
