= Horsham District =

Local government district in West Sussex, England

- Non-metropolitan district
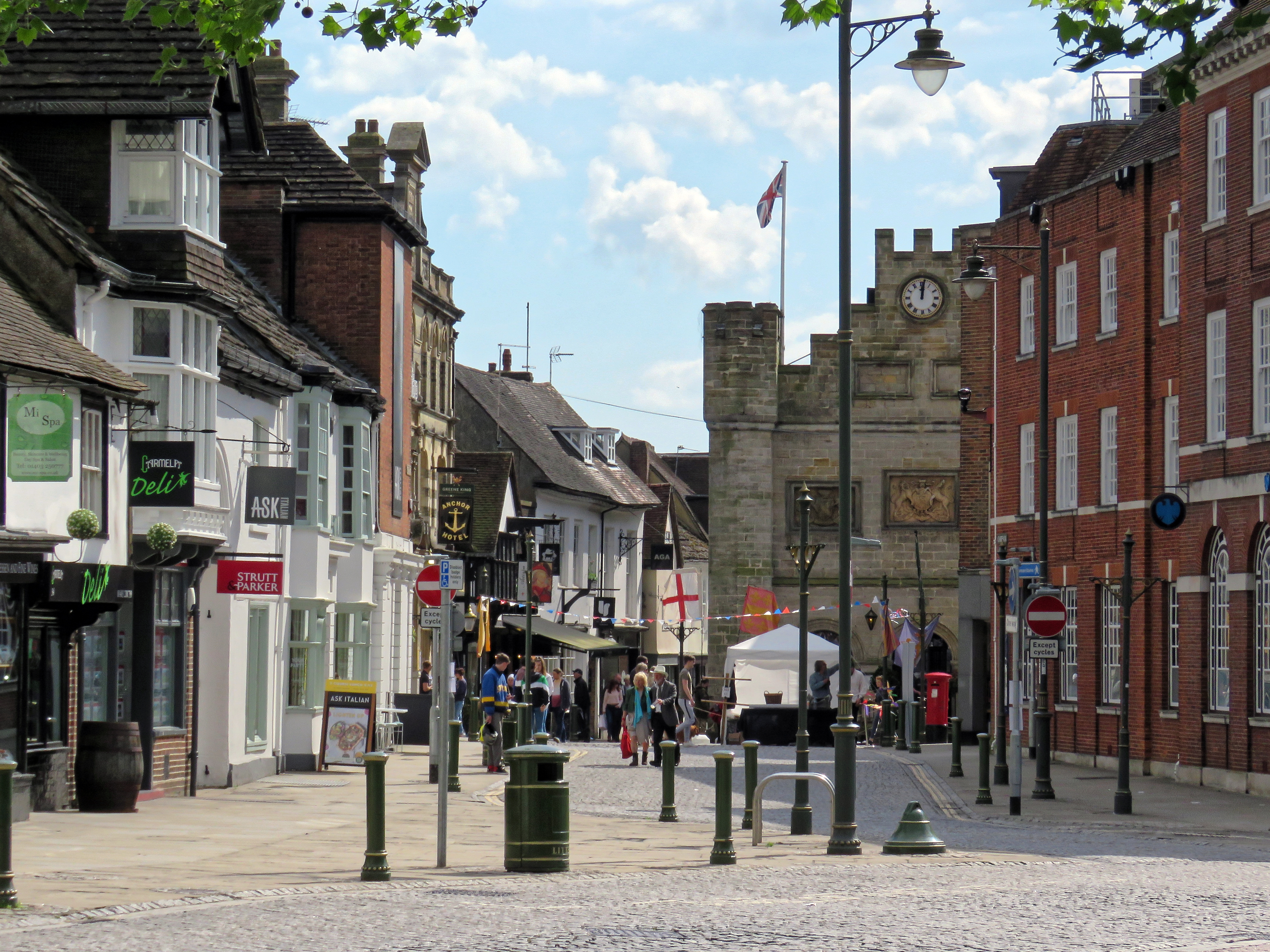
- Market Square from Carfax in Horsham, the district's main town

- Horsham shown within West Sussex
- Sovereign state: United Kingdom
- Constituent country: England
- Region: South East England
- Non-metropolitan county: West Sussex
- Status: Non-metropolitan district
- Admin HQ: Horsham
- Incorporated: 1 April 1974

Government
  - Body: Horsham District Council
  - MPs: Andrew Griffith; John Milne

Area
  - Total: 204.73 sq mi (530.26 km^{2})
  - Rank: 74th (of 296)

Population (2025)
  - Total: 152,016
  - Rank: 150th (of 296)
  - Density: 742.50/sq mi (286.68/km^{2})

Ethnicity (2021)
  - Ethnic groups: List: 93.6% White; 2.7% Asian; 2.1% Mixed; 0.9% Black; 0.6% other

Religion (2021)
  - Religion: List: 49.3% Christianity; 42.1% no religion; 6.1% not stated; 0.9% Islam; 0.6% Hinduism; 0.4% other; 0.4% Buddhism; 0.2% Judaism; 0.1% Sikhism
- Time zone: UTC0 (GMT)
  - Summer (DST): UTC+1 (BST)

Horsham is a local government district in West Sussex, England. It is named after the town of Horsham, which is its largest settlement and where the council is based. The district also includes the surrounding rural area and contains many villages, the largest of which are Southwater and Billingshurst. The district includes part of the South Downs National Park and part of the designated Area of Outstanding Natural Beauty of High Weald. At the 2021 census, the district had a population of 147,487.

The neighbouring districts are Crawley, Mid Sussex, Brighton and Hove, Adur, Arun, Chichester, Waverley and Mole Valley.

== History ==
Horsham itself had been an ancient borough from the thirteenth century but lost its borough status in the 1830s. The town had been made a local government district in 1875, which became Horsham Urban District in 1894.

The modern district was formed on 1 April 1974 under the Local Government Act 1972 as one of seven districts within West Sussex. The new district covered the whole area of three former districts, which were all abolished at the same time:

- Chanctonbury Rural District
- Horsham Rural District
- Horsham Urban District

The new district was named Horsham, after its largest settlement.

== Governance ==
Horsham District Council

Type
- Type: Non-metropolitan district

Leadership
- Chair: Joanne Knowles, Liberal Democrat since 29 April 2026
- Leader: Martin Boffey, Liberal Democrat since 24 May 2023
- Chief Executive: Jane Eaton since April 2022

Structure
- Seats: 48 councillors
- Political groups: Administration (26) Liberal Democrats (26) Other parties (22) Conservative (12) Green (9) Reform (1)

Elections
- Voting system: First-past-the-post
- Last election: 4 May 2023
- Next election: 6 May 2027

Meeting place
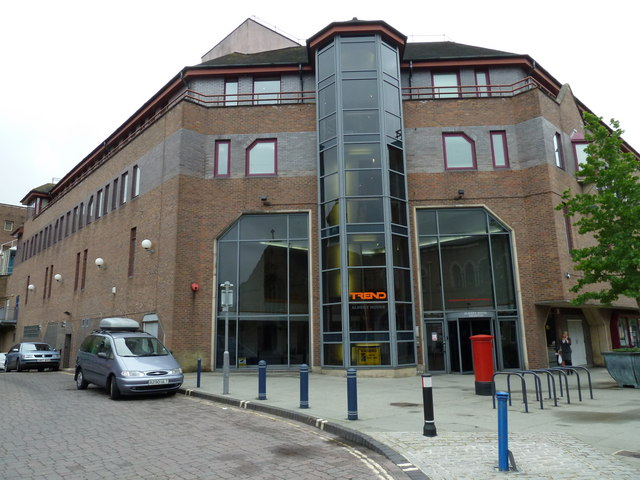
- Albery House, Springfield Road, Horsham, RH12 2GB

Website
- www.horsham.gov.uk

Horsham District Council provides district-level services. County-level services are provided by West Sussex County Council. All of the district is covered by civil parishes, which form a third tier of local government for their areas.

In the parts of the district within the South Downs National Park, town planning is the responsibility of the South Downs National Park Authority. The district council appoints one of its councillors to serve on the 27-person National Park Authority.

=== Political control ===
The council has been under Liberal Democrat majority control since the 2023 election.

The first elections to the council were held in 1973, initially operating as a shadow authority alongside the outgoing authorities until the new arrangements came into effect on 1 April 1974. Political control of the council since 1974 has been as follows:

Party in control	Years
Independent	1974–1976
Conservative	1976–1995
Liberal Democrats	1995–1999
Conservative	1999–2003
No overall control	2003–2007
Conservative	2007–2023
Liberal Democrats	2023–present

=== Leadership ===
The leaders of the council since 2001 have been:

Councillor	Party	From	To
Liz Kitchen	Conservative	2001	22 Apr 2009
Robert Nye	Conservative	22 Apr 2009	14 Dec 2011
Ray Dawe	Conservative	22 Feb 2012	26 May 2021
Paul Clarke	Conservative	26 May 2021	3 Dec 2021
Jonathan Chowen	Conservative	3 Dec 2021	Jan 2023
Claire Vickers	Conservative	2 Feb 2023	May 2023
Martin Boffey	Liberal Democrats	24 May 2023	

=== Composition ===
Following the 2023 election, and subsequent by-elections up to July 2026, the composition of the council was:

Party	Seats
Liberal Democrats	26
Conservative	12
Green	9
Reform	1
Total	48

The next election is due in 2027.

=== Elections ===
Map of the current ward boundaries

Since the last boundary changes in 2019 the council has comprised 48 councillors representing 22 wards, with each ward electing one, two or three councillors. Elections are held every four years.

=== Premises ===
The council is based at Albery House on Springfield Road in Horsham. The council moved into the building in 2025.

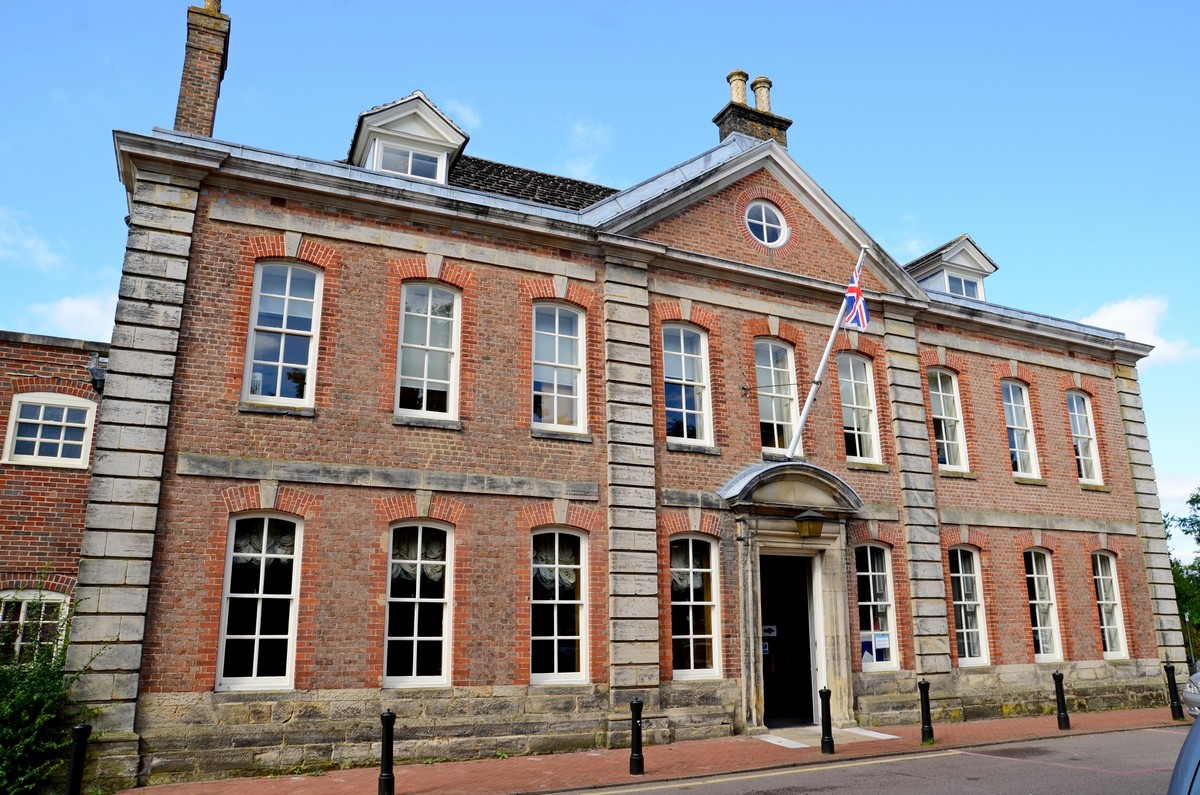
Park House, North Street: One of the council's former offices.

Between 2015 and 2025 the council shared a building called Parkside on Chart Way with West Sussex County Council. Prior to 2015 the council was based across several buildings, including Park House, an eighteenth century house on North Street which had served as the headquarters of the old Horsham Urban District Council since 1928.

== Towns and parishes ==
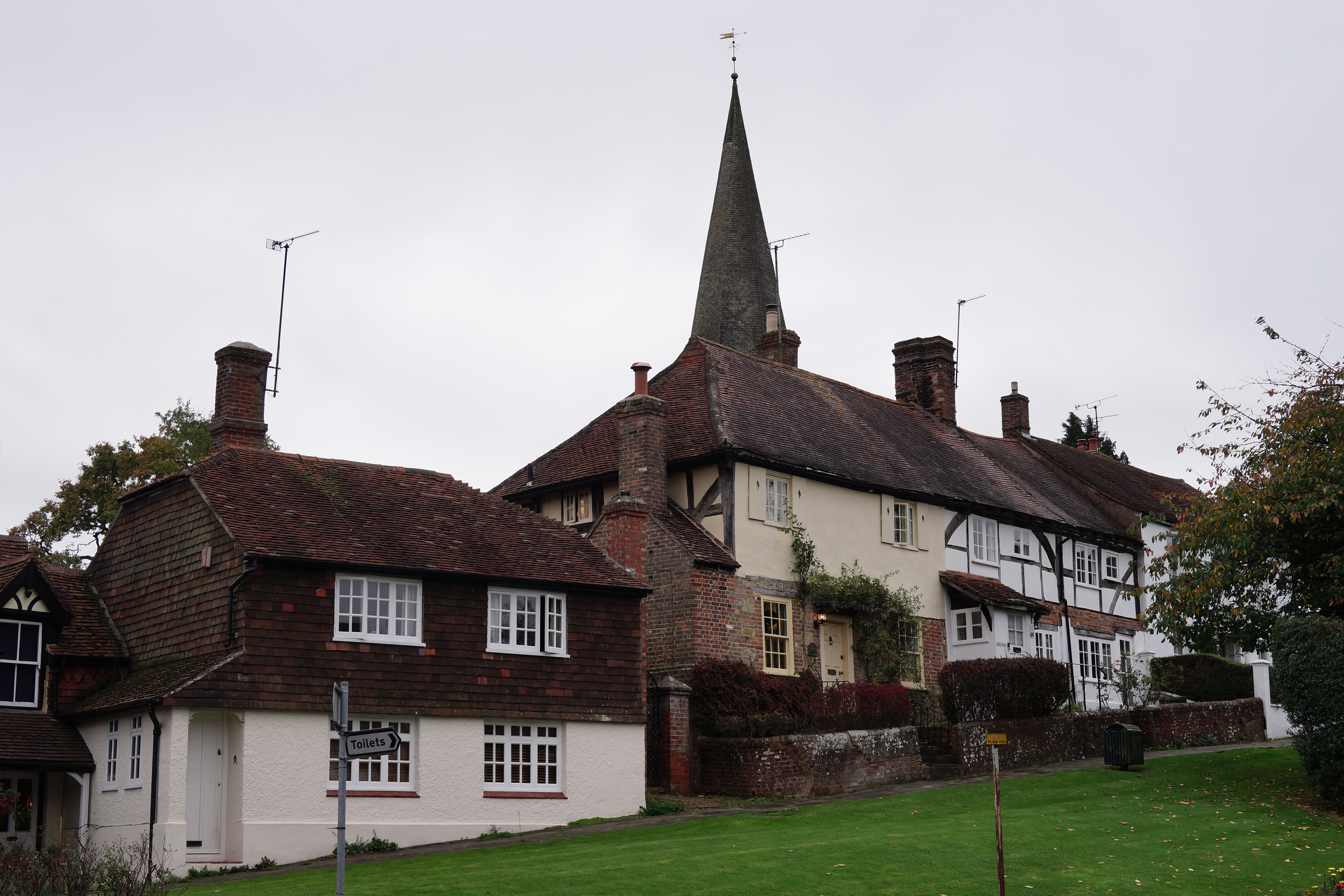
High Street in Billingshurst

The whole of the district is divided into civil parishes. None of the parishes has been formally designated a town by its parish council, although it is expected "Horsham Parish Council" will be renamed to "Horsham Town Council" once the elections are over, Billingshurst, Henfield, Pulborough and Steyning are post towns. From 1974 to 2026 the central part of the Horsham urban area, roughly corresponding to the pre-1974 Horsham Urban District, was an unparished area.

Within the Horsham District are the following civil parishes:

Parish	Type	Area (Hectare)	Population (2001)	Pop Density /Hectare
Amberley	Parish Council	1179.37	533	0.45
Ashington	Parish Council	805.15	2351	2.91
Ashurst	Parish Council	1009.41	226	0.22
Billingshurst	Parish Council	3219.31	6531	2.03
Bramber	Parish Council	719.06	757	1.05
Broadbridge Heath	Parish Council	215.64	3021	14.01
Coldwaltham	Parish Council	893.13	845	0.95
Colgate	Parish Council	2243.67	1119	0.50
Cowfold	Parish Council	1925.57	1864	0.97
Henfield	Parish Council	1734.75	5012	2.89
Horsham	Parish Council	1170.63	23698	20.24
Itchingfield	Parish Council	1091.06	1477	1.35
Lower Beeding	Parish Council	1845.06	1001	0.54
North Horsham	Parish Council	1094.77	21348	19.50
Nuthurst	Parish Council	1696.76	1711	1.00
Parham	Parish Council	1586.23	214	0.13
Pulborough	Parish Council	2098.31	4685	2.23
Rudgwick	Parish Council	2468.98	2791	1.13
Rusper	Parish Council	2588.56	1389	0.54
Shermanbury	Parish Council	775.15	454	0.59
Shipley	Parish Council	3125.60	1075	0.34
Slinfold	Parish Council	1694.81	1647	0.97
Southwater	Parish Council	1400.20	10025	7.16
Steyning	Parish Council	1574.09	5812	3.69
Storrington and Sullington	Parish Council	1199.69	6074	5.06
Thakeham	Parish Council	1170.63	1794	1.53
Upper Beeding	Parish Council	1877.48	3798	2.02
Warnham	Parish Council	1980.21	1958	0.99
Washington	Parish Council	1275.90	1930	1.51
West Chiltington	Parish Council	1732.54	3315	1.91
West Grinstead	Parish Council	2583.65	2934	1.14
Wiston	Parish Council	1359.67	221	0.16
Woodmancote	Parish Council	848.72	478	0.56
Horsham	Total	53096.21	122088	2.30

== Education ==
The Rikkyo School in England, a Japanese boarding school, is located in the Rudgwick community in Horsham District.
