= List of One Foot in the Grave episodes =

One Foot in the Grave is a British sitcom, created and written by David Renwick and produced by the BBC, broadcast on BBC One throughout its run. The series features the exploits of Victor Meldrew, played by Richard Wilson, and his wife Margaret Meldrew, played by Annette Crosbie, in their battle against the trials of modern life. Supporting cast includes Doreen Mantle as Jean Warboys, Angus Deayton as Patrick Trench, Janine Duvitski as Pippa Trench and Owen Brenman as Nick Swainey.

The series is regularly repeated on subscription channel Gold and has also been screened on Drama. While the programme has always been shown after the 9pm watershed on the BBC, other channels have sometimes broadcast it in earlier slots, with minor edits. It is available to stream on both BBC iPlayer and BritBox.

During the course of the programme, 42 episodes of One Foot in the Grave aired, including seven specials over six series, between 4 January 1990 and 20 November 2000.

In addition, there were also two short specials (under ten minutes in length) for Comic Relief, one of which featured Richard Wilson (Victor Meldrew) alone, though it included at one point the voice of Paul Merton. The Comic Relief special in 2001 was set after Victor's death. Though Richard Wilson appeared, Margaret did not interact with Victor's ghost, being unaware of his presence, although she briefly complains about "cold air" beside her.

Some of the episodes did not feature the regular intro with the tortoise, such as "The Trial", "One Foot in the Algarve", "Rearranging the Dust", "The Wisdom of the Witch", "Starbound", "Endgame" and "Threatening Weather".

== Series overview ==
Series
| Series | Episodes | Originally released | |
| Series | Episodes | First released | Last released |
|---|---|---|---|
| 1 | 6 | 4 January 1990 | 8 February 1990 |
| 2 | 6 | 4 October 1990 | 15 November 1990 |
| 2 | Special | 27 December 1990 | |
| 3 | Special | 30 December 1991 | |
| 3 | 6 | 2 February 1992 | 8 March 1992 |
| 4 | 6 | 31 January 1993 | 7 March 1993 |
| 4 | Special | 26 December 1993 | |
| 5 | Special | 25 December 1994 | |
| 5 | 5 | 1 January 1995 | 29 January 1995 |
| 5 | Special | 25 December 1995 | |
| Specials | | 25 December 1996 | 25 December 1997 |
| 6 | 6 | 16 October 2000 | 20 November 2000 |

== Episodes ==
=== Series 1 (1990) ===
| No. overall | No. in series | Title | Directed by | Written by | Original release date | Viewers (millions) |
|---|---|---|---|---|---|---|
Regular series
| 1 | 1 | "Alive and Buried" | Susan Belbin | David Renwick | 4 January 1990 | 9.28 |
Sixty-year-old Victor Meldrew is forced into retirement from his job as a security guard after 26 years, being "replaced by a box" and a recorded message. As he contemplates his future at home, he receives a visit from Nick Swainey from the Outward Bound Scheme for the elderly. Victor has a job interview but arrives very late. Victor practises magic tricks for a performance and is asked to rehearse his act during the evening. On his way, he approaches a woman who is standing on the street and asks her to help him fix his car. She is a policewoman posing as a prostitute and he is put on trial for kerb-crawling. He is acquitted but fined for contempt of court after throwing a Bible at the judge.
| 2 | 2 | "The Big Sleep" | Susan Belbin | David Renwick | 11 January 1990 | 7.25 |
A young female window cleaner accuses Victor of flashing her when, through his bathroom window, she sees him naked and drying his genitals with a flannel. Victor's cousin Geoffrey, who had also just taken early retirement at age 60, dies of a heart attack and the Meldrews attend his funeral. Jehovah's Witnesses visit the Meldrews. The Meldrews attend a fitness class, during which the instructor dies. Victor has been looking after a small bird that regularly perches in his garden; he finds it dead on his lawn and buries it. He falls asleep while sitting in his garden. He awakens to thick fog and thinks he has died in his sleep. He accidentally steps on a rake in his garden and wakes up in a hospital bed thinking he is dead, and his roommate is God.
| 3 | 3 | "The Valley of Fear" | Susan Belbin | David Renwick | 18 January 1990 | 9.20 |
Victor is mugged whilst taking a photograph, tries to scrub insulting graffiti off the outside of his house and finds a dead stray cat in the freezer and dumps it in a skip. Mrs Birkett (Gabrielle Blunt) visits to collect items for an upcoming jumble sale; Margaret invites her to take things from the loft which she had put aside for the sale. Victor closes the loft hatch, unaware that Mrs Birkett is in there. He calls a plumber because of frequent banging which Victor thinks is coming from the radiators. The plumber says that the thermostat is faulty and that he will return in three days to fix it. Victor heads a Neighbourhood Watch meeting at his house, where he shows the attendees a starting pistol which he carries to scare off attackers. He goes to a street market where he takes a jacket which he says is his. He meets Mrs Warboys, who shows him a grenade which her dog dug out of her garden. She removes the pin, so Victor throws it onto a bowling green, then lays on the floor. Two youths think he is having a heart attack and try to "revive" him; Victor thinks they are attacking him, so he repels them. Margaret gives him his jacket which the police recovered and returned. There is a mysterious bad smell around the sideboard.
| 4 | 4 | "I'll Retire to Bedlam" | Susan Belbin | David Renwick | 25 January 1990 | 8.92 |
Victor and Margaret are trapped in their shed for three hours thanks to a swarm of belligerent bees. Later, at the opticians, Victor becomes irate with several fellow customers, including the owner of the escaped bees. After being deliberately left waiting at the opticians by the staff due to his rudeness, Victor returns home believing he is going mad. His perception is not helped by discovering a by-election candidate from the Monster Raving Loony Party, dressed as a bee, using the bathroom. Margaret agrees that she and Victor should babysit the children of Iris, their niece. Victor is overwhelmed by the children's bad behaviour and ties them up in the garage, to Margaret's ire. Victor is admitted to the hospital with gastric problems and has a "close shave" when an escaped psychiatric patient begins shaving him for an "operation". On the way out, Victor berates the local Conservative candidate about the state of the health service.
| 5 | 5 | "The Eternal Quadrangle" | Susan Belbin | David Renwick | 1 February 1990 | 9.50 |
Margaret is pleased when Victor takes up painting – until she discovers that he has been painting a nude model named Doreen (Gillian Barge) and driving her home afterwards. Rather unfairly, Margaret insists that Victor is having an affair despite what he says. Harold Wharton (John Barrard), a friend of Margaret's, wrongly believes that she wants to have sex with him and gets into bed ready for her in the Meldrews' house.
| 6 | 6 | "The Return of the Speckled Band" | Susan Belbin | David Renwick | 8 February 1990 | 8.98 |
Before the Meldrews can leave for their holiday in Athens, they must cope with Victor's fear of flying and Mrs Warboys's food poisoning. A very tall man (Clive Mantle) reads their electricity meter; when he removes his shoes they are accidentally taken to Oxfam, so Victor gives him a pair of his uncle's very large shoes. Victor wrongly assumes that a man who is sitting in a wheelchair is unable to walk and wheels him around and carries him up flights of stairs, until he stands up and tells Victor that it is his wife's wheelchair. An Indian python escapes from a garden centre, and Victor unwittingly carries it into his house. It enters his suitcase and Victor takes it to the airport.

=== Series 2 (1990) ===
| No. overall | No. in series | Title | Directed by | Written by | Original release date | Viewers (millions) |
|---|---|---|---|---|---|---|
Regular series
| 7 | 1 | "In Luton Airport No-One Can Hear You Scream" | Susan Belbin | David Renwick | 4 October 1990 | 8.86 |
The Meldrews return from their holiday only to have Victor subjected to a rectal exam, find that their baggage has been sent to the other side of the world and their house has also been demolished after it was badly damaged by fire. Six months later, they move into a new house and hold a housewarming party, only for Victor to accidentally send their guests to the wrong address twice.
| 8 | 2 | "We Have Put Her Living in the Tomb" | Susan Belbin | David Renwick | 11 October 1990 | 8.10 |
While organising their new house, the Meldrews are entrusted to look after Margaret's goddaughter's tortoise, who accidentally walks into a pile of garden rubbish which Victor burns. Margaret douses the tortoise in cold water when she realises that it has been burnt, but it has died. Victor informs their goddaughter's mother of the tortoise's death; unaware of this, Margaret buys a new tortoise for her. The mother thinks the tortoise in the box they receive is the dead one and buries it alive. Meanwhile, the wallpaper is stripped in the Meldrews' new home.
| 9 | 3 | "Dramatic Fever" | Susan Belbin | David Renwick | 18 October 1990 | 10.20 |
Victor writes a script for a new sitcom, but nobody else finds it funny. Margaret also catches dramatic fever; she joins an amateur dramatics society and gets invited to local thespian Desiree Gibson (Fleur Chandler)'s Bergerac party. Victor argues with a litterbug and gets back at him by tipping rubbish into his car, only to realise it is another man's car.
| 10 | 4 | "Who Will Buy?" | Susan Belbin | David Renwick | 25 October 1990 | 10.66 |
Victor and Margaret are puzzled when a couple named Patrick and Pippa visit as they have no idea who they are. A charity concert gives Victor the chance to share his ventriloquist skills, only to realise his act is part of a rock and death metal variety concert. Margaret's act of kindness towards an elderly blind man has tragic consequences.
| 11 | 5 | "Love and Death" | Susan Belbin | David Renwick | 8 November 1990 | 10.24 |
The Meldrews are on holiday, staying with insufferable old friends Vince (Stephen Lewis) and April (Georgina Hale) in their boarding house on the south coast. During their travels Victor finds a dead seagull in the toilet, is gifted a gravestone, and has a beer glass glued to his head. A series of misunderstandings leads both Victor and Margaret to believe they have cheated on each other.
| 12 | 6 | "Timeless Time" | Susan Belbin | David Renwick | 15 November 1990 | 10.70 |
Victor and Margaret are unable to sleep. During the night Victor has to deal with car alarms, almost opens last year's Christmas present from Ronnie and Mildred and gets his foot caught in a decomposing hedgehog. This episode is set entirely in the Meldrews' bedroom and features the only mention of their late son, Stuart.
Christmas special
| 13 | - | "Who's Listening?" | Susan Belbin | David Renwick | 27 December 1990 | 10.00 |
A mistake on a catalogue order form results in 263 garden gnomes being delivered to the Meldrews' house. The Meldrews meet Pippa's father, Reverend Croker (Geoffrey Chater), a vicar who has lost his faith, and Victor learns more about Mrs Burridge (Cathy Shipton), a video shop worker with whom he had a conflict. Victor volunteers at a homeless kitchen with Reverend Croker only to be held at gunpoint by a disturbed religious man who thinks Armageddon is going to begin that evening.

=== Series 3 (1991–92) ===
| No. overall | No. in series | Title | Directed by | Written by | Original release date | Viewers (millions) |
|---|---|---|---|---|---|---|
Christmas special
| 14 | - | "The Man in the Long Black Coat" | Susan Belbin | David Renwick | 30 December 1991 | 10.84 |
Victor and Patrick's feud continues via the use of Post-it notes, much to the exasperation of their wives. Victor discovers the horse manure he purchased for his allotment is radioactive. Pippa announces she is pregnant. Guest appearance by Eric Idle.
Regular series
| 15 | 1 | "Monday Morning Will Be Fine" | Susan Belbin | David Renwick | 2 February 1992 | 14.75 |
The Meldrews return from a shopping trip to discover their house has been burgled and their neighbours gave the burglars refreshments and a jump start for their van. Victor decides not to replace the television to give them more opportunities to get out of the house. However, an evening trip to the pub results in a disconcerting experience with Margaret's colleague Meg (Diana Coupland), whose fiancé turns out to be Victor's school acquaintance Billy (Richard Davies). As a result, Margaret orders a new television.
| 16 | 2 | "Dreamland" | Susan Belbin | David Renwick | 9 February 1992 | 14.50 |
In a coffee shop, Mrs Warboys tells the story of how Margaret went missing following a series of haunting dreams in which she murders someone who looks exactly like Victor. Mr Swainey evades Victor's attempts to nail the fence closed and invites the Meldrews to see his pigeons.
| 17 | 3 | "The Broken Reflection" | Susan Belbin | David Renwick | 16 February 1992 | 14.50 |
Patrick and Pippa fear the worst when they ask Victor and Margaret to look after their house while they are on holiday. Victor's absent-minded brother Alfred (Richard Pearson) is visiting from New Zealand.
| 18 | 4 | "The Beast in the Cage" | Susan Belbin | David Renwick | 23 February 1992 | 15.60 |
A bank holiday day out turns into a nightmare when the Meldrews and Mrs. Warboys are stuck in a traffic jam staring at a horse's backside for over four hours. Attempting to lighten the mood with music, Victor discovers his car mechanics have recorded a song about him (to the tune of Cwm Rhondda). This summer-set episode was filmed in winter near Luton – when, ironically, real cars were driving past the Meldrews during filming. This episode is set in real time in the Meldrews' car.
| 19 | 5 | "Beware the Trickster on the Roof" | Susan Belbin | David Renwick | 1 March 1992 | 16.16 |
Mr Swainey returns from holiday in north Africa and gives the Meldrews a cursed scorpion paperweight. Victor receives a phone call from the burglars who burgled his house asking for help programming the video recorder. Meanwhile, Patrick and Pippa's attempts to sell their house are hampered when the prospective buyers encounter Victor.
| 20 | 6 | "The Worst Horror of All" | Susan Belbin | David Renwick | 8 March 1992 | 16.20 |
After fending off a visit from Ronnie (Gordon Peters) and Mildred (Jean Challis), the Meldrews attend the filming of a BBC sitcom with a concussed window cleaner who they believe is Mrs Warboys's cousin Wilfred (John Rutland). Victor becomes frustrated when a car containing an old mattress is dumped in the skip outside his house. The following Monday he starts his new job as a hotel doorman, but resigns almost immediately after throwing a snobbish customer's toupee down a drain.

=== Series 4 (1993) ===
| No. overall | No. in series | Title | Directed by | Written by | Original release date | Viewers (millions) |
|---|---|---|---|---|---|---|
Regular series
| 21 | 1 | "The Pit and the Pendulum" | Susan Belbin | David Renwick | 31 January 1993 | 17.30 |
Victor decides that Patrick's cherry tree is the cause of his garden being dry and enlists a Neanderthal gardener (Daniel Peacock) to cut off the roots that are under Victor's garden. After Victor argues with the gardener, the gardener retaliates by burying Victor up to his neck in the hole. Meanwhile, Patrick adopts a dachshund puppy and Margaret is stunned by tragic news.
| 22 | 2 | "Descent into the Maelstrom" | Susan Belbin | David Renwick | 7 February 1993 | 16.67 |
Margaret collapses from nervous exhaustion which has been building up for the past 35 years. After a few days in Victor's care, she decides returning to work would be less stressful. Mrs Warboys visits, bringing Andrea Temple (Helen Lederer), whom Margaret knew as a child, and her baby, who has a mysterious fondness for garden gnomes. Victor uncovers the disturbing truth about her but decides not to tell Margaret.
| 23 | 3 | "Hearts of Darkness" | Susan Belbin | David Renwick | 14 February 1993 | 17.48 |
The Meldrews, Mrs Warboys and Mr Swainey take a trip into the countryside, where they end up stranded in a river playing Trivial Pursuit. Victor and Mrs. Warboys later end up with their feet in a cement block. While searching for help, Victor inadvertently comes to a care home where he is let in by an old man. After discovering that the care home staff are abusing the residents, Victor decides to step in.
| 24 | 4 | "Warm Champagne" | Susan Belbin | David Renwick | 21 February 1993 | 17.00 |
The Meldrews have returned from another miserable holiday. Victor has sunburnt feet and a new lamppost outside the house causes even more problems. Margaret's annoyance at his incessant grumbling makes her consider having an affair with Ben (Tristram Jellinek), a holiday acquaintance. She meets him for drinks...and returns home to find a very old woman in her bed, to her surprise as much as Victor's.
| 25 | 5 | "The Trial" | Susan Belbin | David Renwick | 28 February 1993 | 18.39 |
Victor is home alone while on call for jury service. He receives a letter from disgruntled Jehovah's Witnesses, tries to avoid details of Mrs. Warboys's holiday in Cork, tackles a crossword and contemplates his various ailments.
| 26 | 6 | "Secret of the Seven Sorcerers" | Susan Belbin | David Renwick | 7 March 1993 | 17.99 |
When the Meldrews invite Patrick and Pippa to dinner, Patrick is distinctly worried about what horrors might befall them. Mrs. Warboys believes her husband is having an affair with their neighbour. Meanwhile, Victor has a new job as a lollipop man following the tragic death of the previous one and hoax calls to the fire brigade slow down his preparations for hosting the next meeting of his magicians' club.
Christmas special
| 27 | - | "One Foot in the Algarve" | Susan Belbin | David Renwick | 26 December 1993 | 20.00 |
The Meldrews and Mrs Warboys embark upon a hellish holiday to Portugal. After an entanglement with the police, they finally arrive at their unpleasant villa. Mrs Warboys finds love with her Portuguese pen pal Alfonso (Edward de Souza), donkeys follow Victor around, a paparazzo (Peter Cook) pursues the group trying to retrieve some lucrative snaps and a boxer (Eamonn Walker) tries to find his inner anger...which becomes much easier thanks to Victor's misadventures.: In 2023, the original film negatives were scanned in High Definition 1080i and the restored feature-length special was broadcast for the first time in HD on BBC Four on Christmas Eve 2023. However, the VHS and DVD release still uses the original format.

=== Series 5 (1994–1995) ===
| No. overall | No. in series | Title | Directed by | Written by | Original release date | Viewers (millions) |
|---|---|---|---|---|---|---|
Christmas special
| 28 | - | "The Man Who Blew Away" | Susan Belbin | David Renwick | 25 December 1994 | 15.14 |
The Meldrews are frustrated when their unreliable stolen car is returned just before their insurance company is due to pay out for a new one. Margaret unwittingly buys Christmas crackers which contain jokes about Victor, and the Meldrews receive a surprise visit from Mr Foskett (Brian Murphy).
Regular series
| 29 | 1 | "Only a Story" | Susan Belbin | David Renwick | 1 January 1995 | 16.34 |
Mrs Warboys and her cockatiel stay with the Meldrews because her flat is severely flooded. Victor receives what he believes to be reflexology from a young woman only to find she is actually a prostitute. A media crew set up outside the Meldrews' house after mistaking Victor for a newspaper editor who printed details about a gay MP's private life.
| 30 | 2 | "The Affair of the Hollow Lady" | Susan Belbin | David Renwick | 8 January 1995 | 11.17 |
Mrs Warboys wins a wax model of herself made as the prize in a competition and has it delivered to the Meldrews. Victor's feud with a locksmith reaches a head when he locks the locksmith in his own porch. Local greengrocer Millicent (Barbara Windsor) takes a fancy to Victor and attempts to lure him to her house when he misses a football match he was due to attend in London. She later tries to convince Margaret that Victor is having sex with her.
| 31 | 3 | "Rearranging the Dust" | Susan Belbin | David Renwick | 15 January 1995 | 10.91 |
In the waiting room of their solicitor's office, where Victor is to draw up his will, he and Margaret muse about their life, and Victor assaults a dog owner with a cake. Margaret reminds Victor that it was 37 years ago to the day that they first had sex together. She tells him that it happened at an engagement party and that she thought he was someone else. He tells her that she was his first choice of partner.
| 32 | 4 | "Hole in the Sky" | Susan Belbin | David Renwick | 22 January 1995 | 10.87 |
Margaret and Pippa arrange for Victor and Patrick to go to an Armenian restaurant in a failed attempt to end their feud, but the staff wrongly assume that the two men are lovers. When clearing out their loft in preparation for conversion, Victor discovers and restores a Dutch marionette, which makes Margaret jealous, so she microwaves it. Victor suspects Pippa is having an affair, not knowing that the man is her brother. Margaret is upset at being made redundant due to the shop's closure. The Meldrews' loft is converted by identical twin builders (Christopher Ryan), one of whom plays pranks on Margaret by pretending to be injured.
| 33 | 5 | "The Exterminating Angel" | Susan Belbin | David Renwick | 29 January 1995 | 10.39 |
Mr Swainey is attracted to his mother's nurse, Tania, and Margaret encourages him to ask her out. Victor takes a job as a chauffeur for businessman Lewis Atterbury (John Bird), only to destroy his entire fleet of expensive cars.
Christmas special
| 34 | - | "The Wisdom of the Witch" | Susan Belbin | David Renwick | 25 December 1995 | 17.77 |
Patrick and Pippa have finally managed to move away from the Meldrews, however Victor still manages to make their life a misery when he accidentally gives away all their furniture. The two also have their own problems to deal with in the shape of a seedy hotel and the violently jealous boyfriend of Patrick's assistant at work. When Victor's cousin dies, he and Margaret must clear out her country house; before they go, a witch predicts an untimely end for Victor.

=== Christmas Specials (1996/1997) ===
| No. overall | Title | Directed by | Written by | Original release date | Viewers (millions) |
|---|---|---|---|---|---|
| 35 | "Starbound" | Susan Belbin | David Renwick | 26 December 1996 | 17.47 |
Victor and Margaret return from holiday to find a homeless man (Ray Winstone) living in their shed, who starts receiving his own junk mail. Victor takes a gardening job working for Patrick's new boss, Fenella Fortune (Rula Lenska). Mr Swainey's mother claims that she is being abducted by aliens every night. Things get strange when she disappears and Victor is suddenly full of energy and far less grumpy than usual. "Mr. Tambourine Man" by The Byrds is used in the closing credits.
| 36 | "Endgame" | Christine Gernon | David Renwick | 25 December 1997 | 15.76 |
The Meldrews make an effort to get on with their pleasant new neighbours Derek (Tim Brooke-Taylor) and Betty McVitie (Marian McLoughlin). Victor buys a haunted caravan and accidentally kidnaps the mother of an Indian millionaire.

=== Series 6 (2000) ===
| No. overall | No. in series | Title | Directed by | Written by | Original release date | Viewers (millions) |
|---|---|---|---|---|---|---|
Regular series
| 37 | 1 | "The Executioner's Song" | Christine Gernon | David Renwick | 16 October 2000 | 11.41 |
Victor has a new job as a window cleaner. Patrick's plans for a quiet birthday are ruined after an unfortunate misunderstanding involving a modern art painting. A visit to the "Shaghai Express" Chinese restaurant results in Pippa having a fling and Victor unwittingly discovering the restaurant's underground brothel.
| 38 | 2 | "Tales of Terror" | Christine Gernon | David Renwick | 23 October 2000 | 10.94 |
Victor is angry at the poor job builders have made of his new crazy paving. He also has a health scare – possibly due to his portrayal of an amateur dramatic vampire, and the Meldrews try to get their new car's obscene number plates changed.
| 39 | 3 | "The Futility of the Fly" | Christine Gernon | David Renwick | 30 October 2000 | 10.58 |
Victor hires attractive young cleaner Katy (Katy Carmichael) to help around the house and inadvertently gets Mrs Warboys tattooed. Meanwhile, a large plastic fly is delivered and something strange is going on at the local takeaway.
| 40 | 4 | "Threatening Weather" | Christine Gernon | David Renwick | 6 November 2000 | 8.94 |
Victor and Margaret struggle to keep cool during a power cut on the hottest night of the year. Victor discovers a teenage couple having sex on the back seat of his car, and the Meldrews are visited by the incontinent Mr Smedley (Roy Hudd).
| 41 | 5 | "The Dawn of Man" | Christine Gernon | David Renwick | 13 November 2000 | 9.45 |
A visit from Patrick's gay twin brother Nigel (Geoffrey Perkins) leaves Pippa mentally and physically exhausted, especially when Patrick sits on a cork. Victor takes up fishing.
| 42 | 6 | "Things Aren't Simple Any More" | Christine Gernon | David Renwick | 20 November 2000 | 12.84 |
After a disappointing reunion dinner, Victor is killed in a hit-and-run accident. As Margaret copes with life without him, she receives another shock when she discovers the driver was her new friend Glynis (Hannah Gordon). How she deals with this is left ambiguous. The song "End of the Line" by the Traveling Wilburys is played over the end credits.

== Other media ==
=== Comic Relief specials (1993 and 2001) ===
| Title | Directed by | Written by | Original airdate | Duration |
|---|---|---|---|---|
| "Victor in the Bath" | Susan Belbin | David Renwick | 12 March 1993 | 8 minutes |
Comic Relief special. Victor muses about life while in the bath. Margaret does not appear, but her voice is heard on an answering machine message.
| "Visiting Uncle Dick" | Christine Gernon | David Renwick | 16 March 2001 | 8 minutes |
Margaret is visiting a relative in hospital. Victor is his usual self, complaining about everything; and Margaret is her usual self, pretending not to hear him...or is she? Eric Sykes plays Uncle Dick, who has only one line in the sketch. NOTE: Final appearances of Victor and Margaret Meldrew. Victor appears to be alive, but Margaret does not acknowledge him, implying that he is a ghost after she complains about a "cold air" in the room.

=== Clip shows ===
| Title | Original airdate | Duration |
|---|---|---|
| One Foot in the Grave Selection Box | 9 July 1997 | 35 minutes. |
A clip show in which famous fans of the show choose their favourite moments. This was one of a series of similar clip shows covering various BBC sitcoms and was subsequently released on VHS exclusively through Marks and Spencer. It is not available on DVD.
| I Don't Believe It!: The One Foot in the Grave Story | 20 November 2000 | 45 minutes. |
A clip show presented by Angus Deayton featuring interviews with the people involved with the show, including Richard Wilson, Annette Crosbie, David Renwick, Eric Idle, Tim Brooke-Taylor, Susie Blake, Owen Brenman, Janine Duvitski, Doreen Mantle and Paul Merton. It was originally broadcast immediately before the final episode and was subsequently released as a standalone VHS and included on both the VHS and DVD issues of Series 6.
| Britain's Best Sitcom: One Foot in the Grave | 14 February 2004 | 60 minutes. |
Rowland Rivron presents the case for One Foot in the Grave being voted Britain's Best Sitcom. Extracts of this programme are included on the Series 1 DVD.
| Comedy Connections: One Foot in the Grave | 12 January 2007 | 30 minutes. |
Documentary including interviews with David Renwick and cast and crew members.

=== Radio series (1995) ===
A series of remakes originally broadcast on BBC Radio 2, with Richard Wilson, Annette Crosbie, Owen Brenman and Doreen Mantle reprising their TV roles. Its original run coincided with the broadcast of TV series 5. All episodes are 30 minutes long and produced by Diane Messias. They were subsequently issued on audio cassette, CD, Maroon Vinyl and audio download.

| # | Title | Original airdate | Notes |
|---|---|---|---|
| 1 | "Alive and Buried" | 21 January 1995 | Remake of series 1, episode 1 |
| 2 | "Timeless Time" | 28 January 1995 | Remake of series 2, episode 6 |
| 3 | "In Luton Airport No-One Can Hear You Scream" | 4 February 1995 | Remake of series 2, episode 1 |
| 4 | "The Beast in the Cage" | 11 February 1995 | Remake of series 3, episode 4 |
