= Things Aren't Simple Any More =

- One Foot in the Grave episode
- Victor Meldrew's hand and cap in the gutter after the accident
- Episode no.: Series 6 Episode 6
- Directed by: Christine Gernon
- Written by: David Renwick
- Cinematography by: Geoff Harrison
- Editing by: Mark Lawrence
- Original air date: 20 November 2000

Guest appearances
- Hannah Gordon as Glynis Holloway; Paul Merton as Barman; Joanna Scanlan as Gillian; Jonathan Cecil as Mr Gundry

Episode chronology
← Previous "The Dawn of Man"	Next → "Visiting Uncle Dick"

"Things Aren't Simple Any More" is the final episode of the British television sitcom One Foot in the Grave. It was written by David Renwick and stars Richard Wilson as Victor Meldrew, Annette Crosbie as his wife Margaret and features guest appearances by Hannah Gordon and Paul Merton. The episode depicts the death of the series' protagonist, Victor Meldrew, in a hit-and-run road accident and his wife's efforts to deal with the driver who killed him. Renwick had been struggling to conceive and write new stories for the series and decided to kill off the character. The episode was filmed at Shawford, Hampshire and at BBC Television Centre in London.

Renwick resisted the BBC's attempt to broadcast the episode at Christmas, feeling that such scheduling would contrast unfavourably with the grimness of the show and would be viewed as an overt attempt to garner high ratings. The controller of BBC1 relented and the episode was first transmitted on BBC One on 20 November 2000. The broadcast coincided with the transmission of Who Wants to Be a Millionaire?'s first UK jackpot win. Some people within the BBC alleged that Celador, the production company in charge of Who Wants to Be a Millionaire? had rigged Judith Keppel's victory to spoil the BBC's expected high ratings for the sitcom's finale. The Independent Television Commission (ITC) cleared Celador and ITV of any wrongdoing.

The critical reception for the episode was mostly positive. Many reviewers commented that the dark tone of the final episode was characteristic of the series and that killing off the protagonist was an appropriate way to conclude. The characters of Victor and Margaret returned in a short sketch for Comic Relief's Red Nose Day telethon on 16 March 2001.

== Synopsis ==
Margaret is having a heated telephone conversation with a solicitor about an incident in which Victor is accused of having thrown a syringe into someone's buttock. She reveals that a conviction might be difficult as her husband has been dead for five months. While coming to terms with her husband's death as a hit and run victim, Margaret joins a church group clearing litter from roadsides. There she meets Glynis Holloway (Hannah Gordon), whose husband has also recently died. The two become good friends. Confiding to a priest, Father Blakey (William Osborne), Margaret pledges vengeance for Victor's death, vowing, "If they ever find the bastard who was at the wheel of that car I swear I'll kill him, with my bare hands if I have to and they can do what they like with me." Father Blakey tells Margaret of his hope that one day she finds the strength to forgive the person responsible.

The episode continually switches to flashbacks which show that the circumstances leading to Victor's death stemmed from a simple misunderstanding. A group of pilgrims descend upon the Meldrews' home after misunderstanding Margaret's classified advertisement in her local newspaper of a picture of the Virgin Mary with "two small tears under her eyes". Readers apparently took it to mean the picture was crying rather than ripped. As a result of their exposure in the local paper, Victor is contacted by an old acquaintance and invited to a works reunion. Victor, who is persuaded to go by Margaret, is informed by the barman (Paul Merton) that all but one of the other guests have cancelled for various reasons. Sitting alone while waiting for Limpy, the one remaining potential attendee, Victor is entertained by two cabaret performers (Ed Welch — who wrote the incidental music for all series — and Jean Challis). Victor eventually leaves the pub, with Limpy arriving seconds after he leaves. At the railway station Victor telephones Margaret for a ride. As he stands at the side of the road waiting for her, a car appears and mounts the kerb; Victor is knocked down and killed.

The episode then returns to the present day. Margaret prepares some orange juice and paracetamol for Glynis's migraine. She finds a scrap book of press cuttings surrounding Victor's death in Glynis's kitchen drawer and realises that her new friend is responsible for his demise. As ominous music plays, Margaret thoughtfully looks at the box of paracetamol. Unseen, she drops some tablets into the glass and hands it to Glynis, who realises that her secret has been uncovered. Glynis explains that the night she was driving she had been told that her husband was close to death and was not concentrating on the road properly. As a result, she did not realise she was about to hit Victor until it was too late and had stopped, but left when she saw Margaret arrive. She also tells Margaret how sorry she is and how she never meant to hurt anyone, seeking Margaret out in order to try to help her get over Victor's death. Margaret watches her drink some of the orange juice before leaving the house and driving away, without clarity regarding the fate of Glynis.

The episode ends with a montage of some of the events referred to during the episode, accompanied by the song "End of the Line" by The Traveling Wilburys. Several lines from the song mirror incidents than have occurred in the episode. Scenes include Victor and his car being covered in artificial snow at a supermarket during the filming of a Christmas television commercial in the middle of June; Victor scaring a young couple after grass cuttings are stuck in the sunscreen on his face, as well as the incident with the syringe. The final shots are of Victor and Margaret driving through the countryside in the vicinity of Stonor Park.

== Production ==
=== Development and writing ===
David Renwick found writing the fifth series and the 1997 Christmas special "Endgame" difficult, and he was becoming increasingly busy with his detective series Jonathan Creek. In early 1998, his concerns appeared in the national press. The Evening Standard quoted him: "I have no new ideas for Victor Meldrew ... I know that if I tried to write another series it would be even harder than the Christmas one. I don't want the standard to drop [and] there would be no point in doing something I didn't believe in." A year later, Renwick agreed to write a final series of One Foot in the Grave, having found the four-year break after writing the fifth series fruitful. Renwick decided that Victor should die in the final episode because he did not want to be persuaded to write another series. He cites the final episode of the Only Fools and Horses 1996 Christmas specials "where the fantastic closing scenes of the Trilogy saw the Trotters walking up the Yellow Brick Road, only for them to return five years later". He did not want to be constantly asked by journalists and fans when Victor was coming back to their screens.

In June 1999, while Richard Wilson was performing in Waiting for Godot at the Royal Exchange in Manchester, Renwick informed him of his decision to kill off Victor. The actor reacted positively and said in 2006 that he did not want Victor to "take me over." Wilson had noticed that "the scripts weren't as original as they had been" and that he was "getting a bit tired of the character, trying to maintain a freshness". Annette Crosbie was saddened that the show was coming to an end because she enjoyed working on it, but she understood Renwick's feelings of being pressured to "top the last one".

In an interview for the documentary Comedy Connections, Renwick says that killing off the protagonist "seemed to be the most natural and logical and appropriate end for the character in a show where we had tried to reflect the truthfulness of real life." Victor's demise had been announced in the press in the summer preceding the broadcast.

Renwick decided to use the flashback structure for several reasons. He felt that the episode should be about "life After Victor, which I think will be more interesting and not the route people are expecting you to take." He realised that most viewers would have been aware of Victor's death because of the press coverage; there would be little point in having the death be the climax of the episode because everyone already knew the outcome. However, the focus would be upon Victor's death rather than the details of the accident. Renwick's decision to kill Victor in a road accident was fuelled by the writer's concerns about reckless driving. Also, the suddenness of an accident, as opposed to death by illness, would not negate the comic tone of the rest of the episode. The twist that the person responsible for Victor's death is Margaret's new best friend was designed to add some complexity to the show.

Actress Hannah Gordon, who played the culprit of Victor's demise, admired the tone of the script. Her character was returning from visiting her terminally ill husband in hospital, which distracted her concentration from the road, "but her guilt and conscience is something from which she can't escape."

Scholar Brett Mills observes that it is "strongly implied" that Margaret enacted her vow, expressed earlier in the episode, to "kill whoever murdered her husband". Commenting upon the ambiguity of whether or not Margaret kills Glynis by overdosing her orange juice with tablets, Renwick believes it to be more stimulating to allow audiences to reach their own conclusions.

=== Filming ===
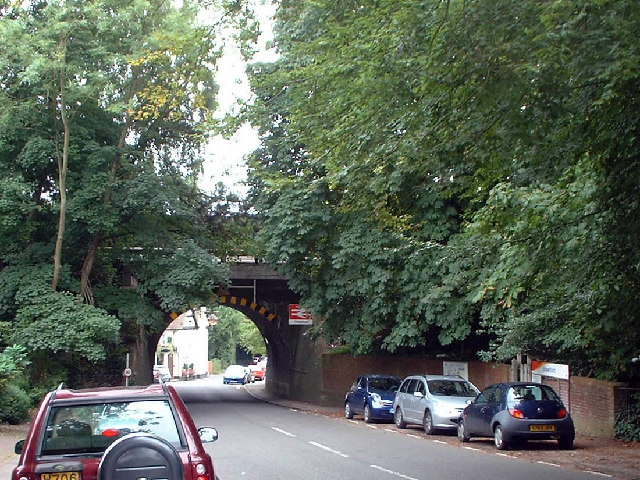
The death scene was filmed near Shawford railway bridge, Hampshire.

The five previous series of One Foot in the Grave were produced and directed by Susan Belbin. She had retired because of ill health. Renwick persuaded her to return to work on the final series to provide continuity, but her health quickly forced her to resign from the show again. The final series was produced by Jonathon P. Llewellyn and directed by Christine Gernon. Wilson and Renwick felt that Gernon's experience working with Belbin on the earlier series of One Foot as a production secretary and assistant, as well as on other shows, meant that her style was similar to Belbin's, which would aid the transition between directors.

The cast and crew assembled in the Bridge Lounge at the BBC Television Centre for the read-through of all six episodes from the final series on 30 June 2000. Nine days later they moved to Bournemouth to film some exterior sequences. One Foot had used Bournemouth since the show's beginning because of its favourable climate, easy access to London along with the lower costs compared to filming in the capital. The exterior scenes of the Meldrews' home were filmed, as they had been since series two, at Tresillian Way in Walkford (a village near New Milton in Hampshire).

Victor's death scene was filmed outside The Bridge Hotel and pub at Shawford railway bridge, next to the River Itchen, Hampshire, on 21 July 2000. The cold temperature on the night of the shoot and the various technical considerations meant that the scene did not have a big emotional impact upon the cast and crew during filming. However, Renwick briefly felt emotional as he watched Victor's arm falling into the shot and his cap drift away in the gutter. After the exterior sequences had been filmed, the remainder of the episode was recorded at BBC Television Centre in West London on 17 September 2000. Unlike the location shoot, Renwick was too concerned with the complexities of filming to be emotionally affected by the filming of the final episode.

== Broadcast ==
The BBC originally wanted to transmit the episode at Christmas, a time of year when audience figures are particularly important for broadcasters. Renwick was unhappy with the plan, writing in his journal in May 2000:

It's almost as if, as broadcasters, we are glorying his death. The context a show is presented in will have a huge impact on how it is received and it's always been our policy to swim against the tide and resist the policy to conform. It seems ironic—and depressing—to me that after deliberately avoiding the "obvious" approach in my script we are now facing a very "obvious" approach to the scheduling. If Victor dies at Christmas it's going to look like a naked push for ratings. The opposite is true: I want Victor's departure to be significant, but stripped of sensationalism.

Renwick outlined his concerns in a letter dated 19 May 2000 to Peter Salmon, the controller of BBC1:

[The show] draws its rhythms and inspiration from reality and occasionally has the power to disarm the viewer with material that is darker or more reflective than they are used to ... Death may be tragic but it is commonplace, the eternal Truth. Let's not trumpet it, but place it simply before the public and let them make up their own minds. I would so like the feeling that we generate on the air to reflect the reality of death in life: most of the time it is a very quiet, private affair, generates little public attention: we grieve and then somehow or other we just have to get on with things. I suppose at the risk of sounding squirmingly precious, I would like Victor to die with dignity.

Salmon agreed not to broadcast the episode at Christmas. It was first transmitted on BBC One on 20 November 2000, forty minutes in length, rather than usual thirty. The episode's transmission was immediately preceded by I Don't Believe It! The One Foot In The Grave Story, a documentary presented by Angus Deayton which looked back at the hit sitcom. The documentary was included as a bonus feature on the DVD release.

The Meldrews returned several months later in a sketch for the Comic Relief telethon held on 16 March 2001. The seven-and-a-half minute sketch, titled "Visiting Uncle Dick", was written by Renwick and directed by Christine Gernon. It centred on Victor and Margaret's visit to an elderly relative in hospital. Although it initially appears to be set before the final episode, the scene concludes with Victor picking up a video of the 1999 thriller film The Sixth Sense and, while commenting that he saw the ending coming, notices that Margaret is totally ignoring him, making him realize he is actually dead. Spike Milligan, who had asked for a guest part in the series, was originally cast to play the patient, but he was too ill and the role was played by Eric Sykes. Renwick and Gernon were dissatisfied with the sketch because of the limited time they were allowed to write and film the piece.

=== Who Wants to Be a Millionaire? controversy ===
The transmission of the game show Who Wants to Be a Millionaire? on rival channel ITV at the same time as the final series of One Foot led to the ratings that year being lower than for previous series. The broadcast of "Things Aren't Simple Any More" coincided with the broadcast of the first UK jackpot win on Millionaire. The news of Judith Keppel's win, recorded the preceding Sunday, was leaked to the press; ITV announced Keppel's success at a press conference on the day of broadcast. Renwick was annoyed that this would take "audience interest" away from One Foot. He said that the early announcement of the outcome of Millionaire was "naked opportunism" and it "would have been more honorable to let the show go out in the normal way". He pointed out that they also "killed off any element off tension or surprise in their own programme", but "television is all about ratings". On the night of its broadcast ITV's Who Wants to be a Millionaire? attracted 13.9 million viewers (48 percent); One Foot, which began transmission fifteen minutes later at 21:15, attracted 10.7 million (36 percent). The episode peaked at 11.6 million viewers when it ran concurrently with its ITV rival.

It was alleged that Celador, the production company in charge of Who Wants to Be a Millionaire?, had rigged the show to spoil the BBC's expected high ratings for the sitcom's finale. Wilson in particular was quoted as saying that ITV had "planned" the win, adding "it seems a bit unfair to take the audience away from Victor's last moments on earth." Richard Webber's account, in his 2006 book, cites "unnamed BBC sources" as those who "questioned the authenticity of Keppel's victory". ITV claimed that the allegation "undermined viewers' faith in the programme" and Leslie Hill, ITV's chairman, wrote a letter of complaint to Sir Christopher Bland, the chairman of the BBC Board of Governors. The corporation apologised, saying that any suggestion of rigging "did not represent the official view of the BBC." Eleven viewers complained about the quiz show to the Independent Television Commission (ITC), but Millionaire was cleared of any wrongdoing.

== Reception ==
Many reviewers commented that the dark tone of the final episode was typical of the series and many praised Annette Crosbie's performance. A reviewer for BBC Comedy said that it "was a characteristically dark end to a show which was never afraid to explore the flip side of the comedy coin." UKTV Gold's website says "it was a suitably downbeat end to an equally downbeat man." Commenting that killing off the protagonist "might seem an odd way for a sitcom to end," the British Film Institute's ScreenOnline says that in a series "where comedy and tragedy are so intertwined, it seems entirely appropriate."

The Daily Telegraph described the episode as displaying "an exhilarating flair for rapid change of comic gear" and commented positively on the scene in which pilgrims descend on the Meldrews' home. Rupert Smith in The Guardian called the episode "a satisfying ending to a series that never went out of its way to be cheerful", referring in particular to the open-ended scene of Margaret dropping the paracetamol into the glass. However, The Independent's Robert Hanks criticised the transitions into the flashbacks for being "clumsily signalled" and said that the direction and score of the paracetamol scene was not equal to the quality of the writing and acting.

Victor Meldrew had become such a cultural icon that many fans left messages and flowers at the location of his death. Fans repeated this on the first anniversary of his screen death, although Renwick suspects that the event was orchestrated by the tabloid press.
