= Shawford railway station =

Railway station in Hampshire, England

Shawford
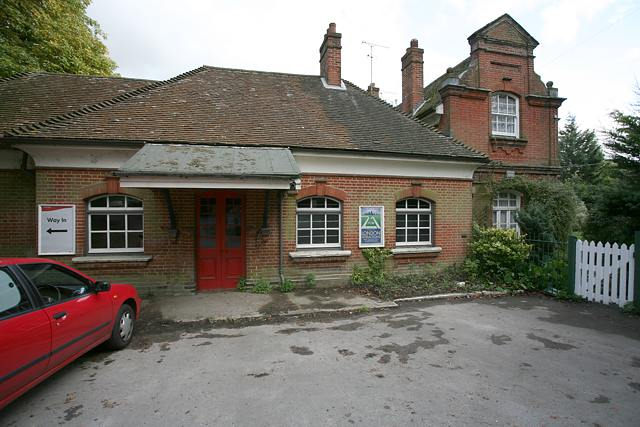

General information
- Location: Shawford, City of Winchester; England
- Coordinates: 51.022°N 1.328°W
- Grid reference: SU472249
- Managed by: South Western Railway
- Platforms: 3

Other information
- Station code: SHW
- Classification: DfT category F2

History
- Original company: London and South Western Railway
- Pre-grouping: London and South Western Railway
- Post-grouping: Southern Railway

Key dates
- 1 September 1882: Station opened

Passengers
- 2020/21: ▼37,206
- 2021/22: ▲87,704
- 2022/23: ▲0.110 million
- 2023/24: ▲0.119 million
- 2024/25: ▲0.140 million
Location
Notes
- Passenger statistics from the Office of Rail and Road

Shawford railway station serves the villages of Twyford, Compton and Shawford in Hampshire, England. It is 69 miles 50 chains (112.1 km) down the line from London Waterloo.

This station and all trains serving it are operated by South Western Railway.

== Layout and facilities ==
The station has three platforms, two in the southbound direction. It previously had a goods yard, but this was closed and sold in the 1990s. The station is unstaffed.

== Services ==
Shawford receives an hourly service in each direction on weekdays (with peak extras), with less frequent services on Saturdays and Sundays. The hourly Winchester to Bournemouth stopping trains provide services between Monday and Saturdays off-peak, in other times trains between London Waterloo and Portsmouth Harbour stops here.

Preceding station	National Rail	Following station
Winchester	South Western Railway; South West Main Line	Eastleigh
	Disused railways	
Winchester (Chesil); Line and station closed	Great Western Railway; Didcot, Newbury and Southampton Railway	Eastleigh; Line and station open

== Accidents and incidents ==
- On 20 July 1952, a passenger train, hauled by SR Lord Nelson Class 4-6-0 No. 30854 Howard of Effingham, overran signals and was derailed by trap points. No-one was injured.

== Appearances in media ==
The station was featured briefly in the 1974 remake of Brief Encounter, starring Richard Burton and Sophia Loren. In 2000, Shawford was used on the final episode of the BBC TV series One Foot in the Grave. The character Victor Meldrew is seen walking from the steps down from the station platform. He then stands in front of the station sign, waiting to be picked up, before being run over by a car.
