= Hannah Gordon =

Scottish actress and presenter (born 1941)

- Born: Hannah Campbell Grant Gordon; 9 April 1941 (age 85); Edinburgh, Scotland
- Education: Royal Scottish Academy of Music and Drama
- Occupations: Actress and presenter
- Known for: My Wife Next Door (1972); The Morecambe & Wise Show (1972); Upstairs Downstairs (1974–75); Telford's Change (1979); The Elephant Man (1980); Joint Account (1989–90); Watercolour Challenge (1998–2001); One Foot in the Grave (2000)
- Spouses: Norman Warwick (m. 1970; died 1994) Rob Leighton (died 2004)
- Children: 1

Hannah Campbell Grant Gordon (born 9 April 1941) is a Scottish actress and presenter who is known for her television work in the United Kingdom, including My Wife Next Door (1972), Upstairs, Downstairs (1974–75), Telford's Change (1979), Joint Account (1989–90) and an appearance in the final episode of One Foot in the Grave, broadcast in 2000. She has presented the Channel 4 lifestyle show Watercolour Challenge from 1998 to 2001 and played Ann Treves in David Lynch's 1980 film The Elephant Man. She is sometimes credited under her first married name of Hannah Warwick.

== Early life ==
Gordon was born in Edinburgh, the daughter of Hannah (née Falconer) and William Munro Gordon. She studied drama at the Royal Scottish Academy of Music and Drama in Glasgow and, after graduating, spent one year at a repertory theatre in Dundee. In 1966–67, Gordon played Kirsty in the Doctor Who serial The Highlanders and made appearances on Jackanory (1969). In 1967, she appeared in the stage play Spring and Port Wine and in 1970 took the same role in the film version.

== Film and television career ==
Her first appearance was as "Zaylo" in the first episode of Out of the Unknown, entitled "No Place Like Earth" by John Wyndham, in October 1965. She appeared in 1969 in an episode of The Champions called "The Final Countdown" and in 1970 she appeared in the film Spring and Port Wine. In 1971, she made two appearances in Play for Today: in the 'Ceilia' instalment of the three-part 'Orkney' episode; and, in 'When the Bough Breaks'. She also appeared in an episode of The Persuaders! titled A Home of One's Own. In 1972, she appeared with John Alderton in 13 episodes of My Wife Next Door on BBC. She played Virginia Hamilton (who later married Lord Bellamy) in the fourth and fifth series of the period drama Upstairs, Downstairs. She appeared in 12 episodes between 1974 and 1975. Gordon also appeared in the 1973 Christmas edition of The Morecambe & Wise Show. Gordon would appear in Morecambe and Wise several times over the course of the years.

In 1979, she appeared in Telford's Change, another drama. In 1981, she played Ethel Le Neve in the Granada Television series Lady Killers. In 1989–90, she starred as a bank manager with Peter Egan and John Bird in the BBC sitcom Joint Account. She voiced the character Hyzenthlay in Watership Down (1978). Other film roles include Alfie Darling (1975) and The Elephant Man (1980) as the wife of Frederick Treves. A later film role was as Kevin McKidd's mother in Made of Honour (2008). In 1981, she starred in Miss Morrison's Ghosts (with Wendy Hiller). She has appeared on television in Goodbye, Mr Kent (1982), the BBC adaptation of Molly Keane's novel Good Behaviour (1983), Hammer House of Mystery and Suspense (1984), My Family and Other Animals (1987), Taggart (1993) and Jonathan Creek (1998). In 2000, Gordon played Glynis, the woman who kills Victor Meldrew in "Things Aren't Simple Any More", the final episode of the sitcom One Foot in the Grave.

Since 2000, she has made guest appearances in Midsomer Murders Judgement Day (2000) as Annabel Weston/Bella Devere, Monarch of the Glen (2002) as Merilyn McNaughton and Heartbeat (2004) in which she played Mrs Barton in episode 5 of series 14, Hunter's Moon.

From 1998 to 2001, she hosted the Channel 4 programme Watercolour Challenge.

She also appeared in the 2007 Christmas episodes of BBC Scotland soap River City, as hotel owner Rose who had rescued Archie Buchanan from the cliffside and taken him in because of his memory loss. In the final episode of series 7 of the BBC series Hustle (2011), she played an old flame of Albert Stroller.

In the 2015 crime drama series Unforgotten (made for ITV), she played Grace Greaves, wife of Father Robert Greaves.

== Stage and theatre ==
Gordon narrated Sergei Prokofiev's Peter and the Wolf in a Christmas concert with the Corinthian Chamber Orchestra at St James's Church, Piccadilly, London on 14 December 2007.

She was the narrator of the opening concert at the 2008 Edinburgh International Festival – Rise and Fall of the City of Mahagonny by Kurt Weill and Bertolt Brecht at Usher Hall on Friday, 8 August 2008. This performance brought together the RSNO, the Edinburgh Festival Chorus, the ladies of the Royal Scottish Academy of Music and Drama and eight soloists.

From 9–20 March 2009, Gordon read Nina Bawden's novel Family Money for BBC Radio 4's Book at Bedtime.
