= Doreen Mantle =

South African-born British actress (1926–2023)

- Mantle in Crown Court (1977)
- Born: 22 June 1926; Johannesburg, South Africa
- Died: 9 August 2023 (aged 97); London, England
- Education: University of the Witwatersrand
- Occupation: Actress
- Years active: 1964–2023
- Television: Coronation Street (2010–2011); One Foot in the Grave (1990–2000); The Duchess of Duke Street (1976)
- Spouse: Graham Smith (m. 1953, divorced)
- Children: 2

Doreen June Mantle (22 June 1926 – 9 August 2023) was a South African-born British actress who played Jean Warboys in One Foot in the Grave (1990–2000). She appeared in many British television series since the 1960s, including The Duchess of Duke Street, The Wild House, Sam Saturday, Chalk, Casualty, The Bill, Doctors, Holby City, Lovejoy, Coronation Street and Jonathan Creek. She played lollipop lady Queenie in Jam & Jerusalem (2006–2009).

== Early life ==
Doreen June Mantle was born on 22 June 1926, in Johannesburg, South Africa, to English parents Bernard and Hilda (née Greenberg), who ran a hotel. When she was six weeks old, her parents moved back to Britain, but they returned to South Africa four years later after the birth of Mantle's brother Alan in 1930.

Mantle attended the University of the Witwatersrand. She acted with the university's dramatic society and appeared on the South African amateur stage and radio, before becoming a social worker. On a visit to London in 1949, she performed at the Gateway theatre. She married Graham Smith, an engine sales manager, in 1953. She moved to the United Kingdom at the age of 23, out of opposition to apartheid, settling in London with her husband.

== Career ==
Mantle acted at Colchester repertory theatre before taking a break from the stage after the birth of her first son. After her return, she had a small role as a wedding guest at the Aldwych theatre in a 1967 Royal Shakespeare Company production of Jules Feiffer’s play Little Murders.

After a lean spell during which she worked as a London tourist guide, Mantle’s career was given a boost by William Trevor’s play Going Home at the King’s Head theatre club, Islington, in 1972. She continued to work extensively on the stage in such productions as My Fair Lady, Keep It in the Family, The Seagull and Hamlet. She also toured Britain in Billy Liar in the role of Florence Boothroyd and performed at the National Theatre in The Voysey Inheritance. In 1979, she was awarded the Laurence Olivier Award for Best Actress in a Supporting Role for her performance in Death of a Salesman. She also undertook radio work for BBC Radio 3 and BBC World Service. Mantle played the long suffering wife of the rabbi in BBC Radio 4's comedy series The Attractive Young Rabbi.

Mantle played Mrs Shaemen in Barbra Streisand's film version of Yentl (1983).

In television many of Mantle's parts were one-offs, but she had a short run as Mrs Catchpole in the first series of The Duchess of Duke Street (1976) and played Karl Marx’s wife in the first two parts of the Eleanor Marx trilogy (1977) and Rita Sterne, mother of the detective (Ivan Kaye) in Sam Saturday (1992).

Mantle would go on to find fame in her sixties, when in 1989 she was cast as the hapless and naive Jean Warboys, friend of Margaret (Annette Crosbie) and Victor Meldrew (Richard Wilson) in David Renwick's sitcom One Foot in the Grave. She appeared in 18 episodes from 1990 until 2000. She would work with Renwick again, appearing in an episode of his comedy drama Love Soup in 2005.

She was a regular in the first two series (2006–2008) of the sitcom Jam & Jerusalem, written by Jennifer Saunders, appearing in 12 episodes as Queenie, the school crossing attendant.

From 2010-11, Mantle briefly appeared in Coronation Street as Joy Fishwick, the mother of Colin Fishwick (David Crellin), who was secretly killed and his identity was stolen by John Stape (Graeme Hawley). In a similar fashion to her son, Joy was killed; albeit unintentionally, by John who was trying to compromise and muffle her screaming.

In early-2023, aged 96, she appeared on the clip show One Foot in the Grave - 30 Years Of Laughs, when along with other cast and crew members she took a look back at the show for which she became well known.

== Personal life and death ==
Mantle married Graham Smith in 1953; they had two sons together, but later divorced. From the mid-1990s she was a resident of Highgate, London.

Mantle died at home in London on 9 August 2023, at the age of 97.

== Filmography ==
Source, unless specified:

=== Films ===
Year	Title	Role	Note
1967	Privilege	Miss Crawford	
1972	Frenzy	Woman in Crowd	Uncredited
1975	All Creatures Great and Small	Mrs Seaton	TV movie
1979	Black Jack	Mrs Carter	
1979	Secret Orchards	Aunt Bunny	TV movie
1981	The French Lieutenant's Woman	Lady on Train	
1983	Yentl	Mrs Shaemen	
1983	St. Ursula's in Danger	Miss Cowley	
1984	Home Video		
1985	Star Quality: Bon Voyage	Mrs Teitelbaum	TV movie
1990	Mountains of the Moon	Mrs Speke	
1992	The Turn of the Screw	Doreen	
1994	A Man You Don't Meet Every Day	Mrs Norton	
1996	In Love and War	Emilia	
1997	So This Is Romance?	Clairvoyant	
2004	Suzie Gold	Nana's Friend	
2005	Antonio's Breakfast	Lady with Rubbish	Short
2006	Scoop	Joe's Co-Passenger	
2010	Two Ladies & a Hill	Hillary	Short
2011	Late Bloomers	Nora	
2012	The Owner	Felicity	
2012	Over the Hill?	Mrs Parker	
2013	Fire Horse	Ada	Short
2017	55 Steps	Eleanor's Mother	
2018	Knock at the Door	Mrs. Harris	Short
2018	Jean	Jean	Short
2019	Blind	Mrs Wood	Short

=== Television ===
Year	Title	Role	Notes
1964–1965	Emergency Ward 10	Mrs Cox	
1965	A Passage to India (Play of the Month)	Mrs Fletcher	
1966–1973	Love Story	Mrs Driver / Madge / Mrs Bryant	
1967	Uncle Charles	American Wife	
1969	Strange Report	Mrs Ogilive	
1969	The Letter	Madame Joyce	
1969–1973	Special Branch	Mrs Harris (Episode 'A New Face') / Miss Mitchell	
1972	Kate	Harriet Bates	
1972	Six Days of Justice	Probation Officer	
1972–1977	Crown Court	Vera Tilley / Mrs Verity Holt-Matthews	
1973	Armchair 30	Miss Fanshaw	
1973	Public Eye	Miss Barnwell	
1973	Vienna 1900	Frau Arbesbacher	
1973	The Song of Songs	Frau Czepanek	
1974	Intimate Strangers	Dorothy	
1974	Marked Personal	Mrs Hastings	
1974–1979	Play for Today	Mary Hunter / Julia Branston / Mother	
1976	The Duchess of Duke Street	Mrs Catchpole	
1976	Billy Brand	Edna James	
1977	Esther Waters	Mrs Randal	
1977	Headmaster	Chairwoman	
1977	Eleanor Marx	Frau Marx	
1978	Secret Army	Mme. Desmarts	
1979	Mystery!: Malice Aforethought	Hilda	
1979	Thomas & Sarah	Mrs Ryder	
1980	The Gentle Touch	Beryl King	
1980	Ladykillers	Mrs Wheeler	
1980	Pride and Prejudice	Mrs Reynolds	
1980–1981	BBC2 Playhouse	Mrs Orpen / Margaret	
1983	The Home Front	Medora	
1984	Charlie	Maggie	
1985	Summer Season	Matron	
1985	Connie	Miss Greer	
1987	Sunday Premiere	Mrs Venables	
1987	Screenplay	Mother Monica	
1990	Screen Two	Landlady	
1990–2000	One Foot in the Grave	Mrs Warboys	18 episodes
1990–2002	Casualty	Renee Wainwright / Mrs Duffin	
1991	Stanley and the Women	Lady Bailey	
1992	Nice Town	Jean Thompson	
1992	The Secret Agent	Mrs Waller	
1992	Sam Saturday	Rita Sterne	
1992	Mr Wakefield's Crusade	Chrissie	
1992	Lovejoy	Vera	
1994	Class Act	Hilda Skoric	
1994	Peak Practice	Mary Eastman	
1996	Testament: The Bible in Animation	Naomi	
1996	Our Friends in the North	Mrs Wilson	
1996	The Vet	Edie Davenport	
1997	Chalk	Dr. Eleanor Gillespie	
1997–1999	The Wild House	Granny	
2000	Where the Heart Is	Miriam Stone	
2001–2019	Doctors	Mrs Merriam / Winnie Carpenter / Doris Forsyth / Rose	Recurring roles
2003	The Bill	Anne Culshaw	
2004	Doc Martin	Marianne Walker	
2004	Shadow Play	Queen Victoria	
2004–2009	Holby City	Simone Mannstein / Sylvia Wheeler	
2005	Love Soup	Mavis Bledsoe	
2005	Twenty Thousand Streets Under the Sky	Marion Chingford	
2005	Hustle	Anne Foster	
2006	Brief Encounters	Frances	
2006–2008	Jam & Jerusalem	Queenie	
2007	The Sarah Jane Adventures	Mrs Randall	
2007	Holby Blue	Maureen Jessie	
2008	Bonekickers	Mary Cunley	
2009	The Queen	The Queen Mother	
2010	Dirk Gently	Ruth Jordan	
2010	Jonathan Creek	Mrs Gantry	
2010–2011	Coronation Street	Joy Fishwick	10 episodes
2011	My Family	Lillian	
2013–2014	The Mimic	Martin's Grandma / Martin's Nan	
2015	Lewis	Joan	
2018	Father Brown	Miss Tibby	
2023	One Foot in the Grave - 30 Years Of Laughs	Herself/Mrs Warboys	
