= The Executioner's Song (disambiguation) =

The Executioner's Song is a 1979 novel by Norman Mailer.

Executioner's Song or The Executioner's Song may also refer to:

- Executioner's Song (album), by thrash metal band Razor
- The Executioner's Song (film), a 1982 film adaption of the book
- "The Executioner's Song", an episode of One Foot in the Grave
- "The Executioner's Song", an episode of Supernatural

== See also ==
- "Song of the Executioner" (Highlander)
- "X-Cutioner's Song", a X-Men comic crossover story arc
