= Britain's Best Drives =

- Starring: Richard Wilson
- Country of origin: United Kingdom
- Original language: English
- No. of episodes: 6 + 1 Special

Production
- Producer: Neil Edwards
- Running time: 30 minutes

Original release
- Network: BBC Four
- Release: 19 February – 26 March 2009

Britain's Best Drives is a six-part 2009 British television series in which Richard Wilson travels across the UK in reviewing the best driving roads from a motoring guide of the 1950s. In each episode he drives a different car of the period. There was also a seventh episode where Wilson learns how to drive a manual transmission car again.

== Episode list ==
#	Title	Subject	Vehicle	Airdate	Ref.
1	North Yorkshire Moors	Wilson drives from Scarborough to Whitby	Morris Minor Traveller	19 February 2009	
2	North Wales	Wilson takes a circular route from Caernarfon that loops through Snowdonia	Ford Zodiac	26 February 2009	
3	North Cornish Coast	Wilson takes a coastal road from St Ives to Land's End	Volkswagen Type 2	5 March 2009	
4	The Lake District	Wilson travels from Keswick to Windermere then up to Penrith	Triumph TR3A	12 March 2009	
5	The Wye Valley and Forest of Dean	Wilson heads north from Chepstow to Symonds Yat	Austin Cambridge	19 March 2009	
6	The Trossachs	Wilson travels from Callander to Inversnaid	Bentley Mark VI	26 March 2009	
7	Richard Wilson Learns To Drive	Wilson learns how to drive a stick-shift car again	Various	12 March 2009	

== DVD ==
This series is available on DVD, distributed by Acorn Media UK.
