= Sam Saturday =

Television series

- Genre: Police procedural
- Created by: Alvin Rakoff
- Written by: Stanley Price; Stuart Hepburn; Arthur McKenzie; John Milne
- Directed by: Alan Dossor; Alvin Rakoff
- Starring: Ivan Kaye; Peter Armitage; Doreen Mantle; Dennis Victory; Michael Elwyn; David Fleeshman; Simon Slater
- Composer: Rick Wentworth
- Country of origin: United Kingdom
- Original language: English
- No. of series: 1
- No. of episodes: 6

Production
- Executive producers: Verity Lambert; Nick Elliott
- Producer: Sharon Bloom
- Production locations: London, England, UK
- Editor: Jake Bernard
- Running time: 51 minutes
- Production companies: Cinema Verity; LWT

Original release
- Network: ITV
- Release: 27 June – 8 August 1992

Sam Saturday is a British television police procedural series, broadcast between 27 June and 8 August 1992. The six-part series produced by Cinema Verity in association with LWT, broadcast on the ITV network, follows the work of DI Sam Sterne (Ivan Kaye), a Jewish police detective, as he struggles to balance the demands of the job with his private life. The series was created by writer and director Alvin Rakoff, and was produced by the production company of executive producer Verity Lambert. The series was just one of a number of commissions made by LWT controller of drama Nick Elliott in 1991, following the announcement that both The Ruth Rendell Mysteries and Inspector Morse were to cease production.

The first episode of the series finds Sterne moving back in with his mother, Rita (Doreen Mantle), after a messy divorce. Three episodes of the series were written by Stanley Price. Despite good reception, in the light of both Inspector Morse and The Ruth Rendell Mysteries returning to the ITV schedules, a second series was never commissioned. In 2013, Kaye stated in an interview that he was grateful to have "his own series at 30", and explained how the series allowed him to break through into other television roles, as well as securing a leading West End role within six months of the programme's broadcast.

== Cast ==
- Ivan Kaye as DI Sam Sterne
- Peter Armitage as Jim Butler
- Doreen Mantle as Rita Sterne
- Dennis Victory as Mike
- Michael Elwyn as CDI Simpson
- David Fleeshman as Michael Sterne
- Simon Slater as DI Griffiths
- Lauren Jacobs as Miriam Sterne
- Paul Opacic as DC Knights
- Helen Levien as WPC Daniels
- Marc Warren as DC Colin Fennel

== Episodes ==
No.	Title	Directed by	Written by	British air date
1	"On the Other Hand"	Alvin Rakoff	Stanley Price	27 June 1992
2	"Home Free"	Alvin Rakoff	John Milne	4 July 1992
3	"Street Life"	Alan Dossor	Stanley Price	11 July 1992
4	"Chocolates Would Be Nicer"	Alan Dossor	Stanley Price	25 July 1992
5	"Judgement"	Alan Dossor	Arthur McKenzie	1 August 1992
6	"A Chemical Reaction"	Alan Dossor	Stuart Hepburn	8 August 1992
