= Joint Account (TV series) =

BBC sitcom

- Genre: Sitcom
- Written by: Don Webb
- Directed by: Mike Stephens
- Starring: Hannah Gordon; Peter Egan
- Country of origin: United Kingdom
- Original language: English
- No. of series: 2
- No. of episodes: 16

Production
- Producer: Mike Stephens
- Running time: 30 minutes

Original release
- Network: BBC1
- Release: 26 January 1989 – 21 May 1990

Joint Account is a British television sitcom produced by the BBC.

Starring Hannah Gordon and Peter Egan, the series follows the Braithwaites, a married couple. Belinda Braithwaite is the breadwinner, a bank manager, whilst David is a house-husband. The sitcom revolves around the mismatched pair and the role reversal of their domestic situation.

Two series were transmitted on BBC1 between 26 January 1989 and 21 May 1990. The first series has six episodes; the second series has 10 episodes.

== Cast ==
=== Main ===
- Hannah Gordon – Belinda Braithwaite
- Peter Egan – David Braithwaite
- John Bird – Ned Race
- Lill Roughley – Louise Carr
- Ruth Mitchell – Jessica Farmer
- Richard Aylen – Charles Ruby

=== Recurring ===
- Andrew Hilton – Barrington Ricketts
- Julia St John – Teresa Smith

== Home media ==
The complete series of Joint Account was made available on DVD in the UK from Simply Media on 5 September 2016.
