= I Could Never Go Vegan =

British Vegan Documentary Film

- Directed by: Thomas Pickering
- Written by: James Pickering, Thomas Pickering
- Produced by: Lock The Tent Productions, Memphis James Pictures
- Narrated by: Thomas Pickering
- Release date: 19 April 2024 (United Kingdom)
- Running time: 1h 37m
- Country: United Kingdom
- Language: English

I Could Never Go Vegan is a 2024 British documentary film directed by Thomas Pickering, which explores the plant-based lifestyle and its impact on individuals and society. The film aims to address common misconceptions about veganism and provide a balanced view of the benefits and challenges associated with adopting a vegan diet.

== Plot ==
The documentary explores common arguments individuals make for why "[they] could never go vegan." Through a series of interviews, personal stories, and expert testimonies, it examines the ethical, environmental, and health reasons behind the vegan movement.

It features interviews with nutritionists, environmentalists, opinion leaders, and activists, including George Monbiot and Melanie Joy, as well as personal stories from athletes, such as British powerlifter Sophia Ellis, and other individuals who have made the transition to a vegan lifestyle. The Happy Pear Twins feature.

The film also provides practical advice on changing to a plant-based diet and addresses the social and cultural barriers that people face when considering veganism.

== Background ==
Director Thomas Pickering shared his motivation for making the documentary, stating:

"I Could Never Go Vegan is truly a film for anyone who has ever heard or said these words. It's not uncommon for me to have daily conversations with friends, colleagues, or strangers, and for them to utter these words to me. But why? That's exactly what I wanted to explore in this film, seeking to find out whether the arguments that face the vegan movement are justified or not."

== Production ==
The film was produced by Lock The Tent Productions and Memphis James Pictures. The executive producers were Peter Egan, Alicia Silverstone, Heather Mills, and Alissa White-Gluz.

== Release ==
The film premiered at Curzon Soho, London on 10 April 2024, and Curzon Sheffield, Sheffield on 11 April 2024. It was released by Dartmouth Films in the UK and Ireland on 19 April 2024.

The film was released on streaming services Prime Video and Apple TV+ in the USA on 3 December 2024 and on 30 December 2024 in the UK.

== Reception ==
I Could Never Go Vegan received generally positive reviews from critics. Peter Bradshaw of The Guardian gave the film 4/5 stars and described it as "cheerfully persuasive", highlighting its effectiveness in addressing the common concerns and misconceptions about veganism.

Time Out emphasised the film's mission to change eating habits, noting its potential impact on viewers' dietary choices, while City A.M. praised the documentary as a "well-reasoned lecture" on veganism. The List highlighted the film's compelling case for plant-based living, calling it a "watertight case for plant-based".

The Grocer called it a "positive, persuasive plant-based argument". Now Then Magazine appreciated the film's approach to addressing common objections to veganism and Film Review Daily wrote "viewers already into veganism will surely be delighted to have a feature film expressing their chosen lifestyle in this way and, unless adamant about wanting more discussion with both pros and cons considered, many others will feel that the Pickering brothers have done a very good job indeed."
