= Compton and Shawford =

Civil parish in Hampshire, England

Coordinates: 51.023255°N 1.329079°W

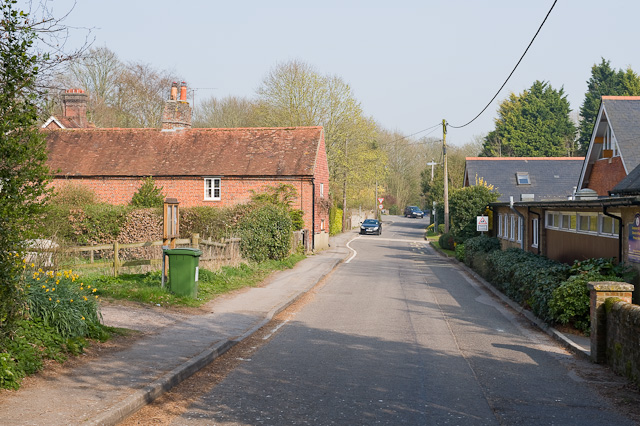
- Compton Street; primary school on right

- Location within Hampshire
- Population: 1,420; 1,729 (2011 Census)
- OS grid reference: SU470251
- Civil parish: Compton and Shawford
- District: City of Winchester
- Shire county: Hampshire
- Region: South East
- Country: England
- Sovereign state: United Kingdom
- Post town: Winchester
- Postcode district: SO21
- Dialling code: 01962
- Police: Hampshire and Isle of Wight
- Fire: Hampshire and Isle of Wight
- Ambulance: South Central
- UK Parliament: Winchester
- Website: comptonshawford-pc.gov.uk

Compton and Shawford is a civil parish in the City of Winchester district, immediately southwest of the city, in Hampshire, England. Its main settlements are the villages of Compton and Shawford.

== Description ==
Yew Hill is a prominence of elevation 121 metres (397 ft) above sea level situated approximately one kilometre (0.62 mi) northwest of Compton A covered reservoir fed by water pumped from Otterbourne water works is located here. Silkstead Lane runs alongside Yew Hill. A Butterfly Conservation area has been established at Yew Hill, 5.85 hectares (14.5 acres) in total size, with open access to an area of 1.5 hectares (3.7 acres).

== Geology ==
The parish lies on the Upper Cretaceous chalk at the northern edge of the Hampshire Basin, dipping south from the Winchester anticline, with successively younger beds being exposed from north to south. In the north the Seaford Chalk formation of Santonian age makes up Compton Down. South of this the Newhaven Chalk outcrops in the dry valley running down from Oliver's Battery to Shawford. In the south of the parish the Culver Chalk of Campanian age is largely overlain by a layer of 'clay-with-flints' weathered out of the chalk. In the east the chalk is cut through by the Itchen valley and overlain by calcareous tufa.

A feature of the geology is the hill immediately southwest of the village of Shawford known as Shawford Down. This area is noted for its rich variety of habitats and the grazed pasture supports a wealth of flora and fauna, including notable insects and wildflowers.

== History ==
In the 1086 Domesday Book, Compton came under the manor of Chilcomb, but by 1250, was a separate manor, held by the Wasseling family. It was later held by the Philpot, Tichborne, and Heathcote families. The village had a mill on the river Itchen, which forms the parish boundary with Twyford.

John Philpot of Compton was an early English martyr, executed in the reign of Queen Mary.

== Parish church ==
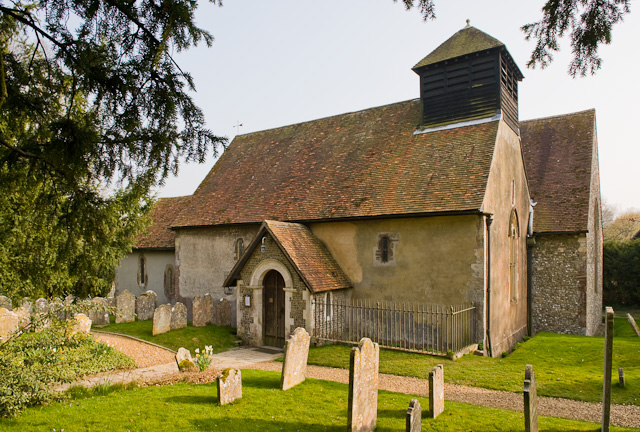
All Saints' Church

All Saints' church in Compton dates in part from the 12th century. It is unusual in that it has two naves and two chancels, the original Norman constructions being supplemented by a new nave and chancel in 1905. A bell-turret was added to the church in 1880. The church's font appears to date from the Norman period.

== Amenities ==
National Cycle Route 23 passes through the parish, as do bus services provided by Bluestar. The M3 motorway also goes through the parish, with junction 11 to the north and junction 12 to the south. Shawford railway station is served by stopping services on the South West Main Line.

The parish is crossed from east to west by the Monarch's Way long-distance footpath, and from north to south by the Itchen Way.

Compton is represented in the Hampshire Cricket League as one half of Compton & Chandlers Ford CC following the merging of Compton & Shawford CC and Chandlers Ford CC in 1995. The club plays its home games at the Memorial playing fields, just off of Shepards Lane.

== In media ==
Shawford was the location for Victor Meldrew's death the One Foot in the Grave episode "Things Aren't Simple Any More". It is referred to in Robyn Hitchcock's song "Winchester".

Shawford railway station was featured in a 1974 film starring Sophia Loren, a remake of Brief Encounter, as was Winchester station (though most filming took place at Brockenhurst). It caused great excitement in the village; a large crowd watched the actress being filmed getting out of a car on the forecourt.

== Nearby places ==
- Otterbourne
- Twyford
- Colden Common
- Winchester
