= Sophia Ellis =

British weightlifter

Sophia Ellis (born 1996) is a British powerlifter who broke the European deadlift record of 245.5kg in Estonia 2023, 240.5kg at the European Championships in Poland 2022, and in Sweden 2021 with 230.5kg. She is two-time European Champion (2022 and 2023) and gold deadlift medalist at the IPF World Classic Championships 2023. She competed for Team Great Britain.

In April 2022, she won the British National Championships, breaking six British records and lifting the heaviest deadlift in British powerlifting history (237.5kg), to progress to the World Classic Championships in South Africa.

== Personal life ==
Ellis has been vegan since 2011. She has stated, "To start with, it was due to health reasons; I'm lactose intolerant and wanted to start reducing my meat consumption. But the more I looked into veganism, the more my eyes opened to the ethical and environmental side of this lifestyle, which completely sold it to me." In 2024, Ellis appeared in the British documentary film I Could Never Go Vegan.

For several years she "battled anorexia and bulimia, culminating in being admitted to the Maudsley Hospital in Camberwell"; after recovering, she took up powerlifting, and quickly progressed to setting national records. She is an ambassador for eating disorder awareness after overcoming anorexia and bulimia nervosa.
