= Peter Egan =

British actor (born 1946)

- Born: Peter Joseph Egan; 28 September 1946 (age 80); Hampstead, London, England
- Occupations: Actor; activist
- Years active: 1967–present
- Spouse: Myra Frances (m. 1972; died 2021)
- Children: Rebecca Egan (step-daughter)

Peter Joseph Egan (born 28 September 1946) is a British actor. He is known for television roles including Hogarth in Big Breadwinner Hog (1969), the future King George IV in Prince Regent (1979); Paul Ryman in the sitcom Ever Decreasing Circles (1984–89); Hugh "Shrimpie" MacClare, Marquess of Flintshire, in Downton Abbey (2012–15); and Martin Hughes in Unforgotten (2015–2021).

== Early life ==
Egan was born on 28 September 1946 in Hampstead, London, the son of Doris (née Pick) and Michael Thomas Egan, who was of Irish descent. He was educated at St George's Catholic School, Maida Vale. He also attended the London Oratory School and the Royal Academy of Dramatic Art.

== Career ==
Egan's first stage performance was in Charlie Girl. His first television role was as the sex-and-cinema-obsessed Seth Starkadder in a BBC serialisation of Cold Comfort Farm (1968). In 1969, he had come to notoriety as the acid-throwing gangster Hogarth in the controversial Granada series Big Breadwinner Hog. Later, he had other starring roles: as John Everett Millais in the BBC serial The Love School (1975); as Oscar Wilde (the role which introduced him to American audiences) in the serial Lillie (1978), starring Francesca Annis as Lillie Langtry; as Magnus Pym in the BBC dramatisation of John le Carré's A Perfect Spy (1987) and another BBC sitcom, Joint Account (1989–90).

Egan played the title role in the BBC series Prince Regent (1979), and was a sinister immortal Knight Templar in Michael J. Bird's BBC series The Dark Side of the Sun (1983). Egan also played Fothergill in the television series Reilly, Ace of Spies (1983). In 1986, he had the role of Henry Simcox in the television dramatization of John Mortimer's Paradise Postponed.

Egan also guest-starred in episodes of The Ruth Rendell Mysteries ("A New Lease of Death," 1991) and A Touch of Frost ("Private Lives," 1999).

Egan's other roles have included the character Michael Cochrane in the programme The Ambassador (1998), and (on film) as the suave secret agent Meres in television spin-off Callan (1974), and the Duke of Sutherland in Chariots of Fire (1981). In 2007, Egan took the role of Victor in the film Death at a Funeral. In 2009, he toured as lead Sir Hugo Latymer in Nikolai Foster's revival of Noël Coward's A Song at Twilight. He is the narrator for the US and UK versions of Forza Motorsport 3 and its sequel, Forza Motorsport 4.

In 2012, Egan first appeared as Hugh "Shrimpie" MacClare, Marquess of Flintshire, in the Christmas special episode of ITV's Downton Abbey. For the drama's fifth series, Shrimpie became a recurring character; he also briefly appeared in series six. Later that same year, Egan appeared in Alan Bennett's People, alongside Frances de la Tour, at the National Theatre.

Also in 2012, Egan narrated a new recording of Rick Wakeman's album, Journey to the Centre of the Earth, based on the story by Jules Verne.

In 2024, Egan appeared in the British documentary film I Could Never Go Vegan.

== Animal rights activism ==
Egan is a longtime animal lover and vegan. Starting in 2010, he began to campaign publicly on behalf of animal rights.

Egan is an ambassador for the dog rescue Saving Strays in Sarajevo, Bosnia. He and his wife Myra adopted their Bosnian dog Tidus from this dog rescue. He continues to give support to stray street dogs of Sarajevo and their lone rescuer Milena Malesevic.

Egan is an active ambassador for the Animals Asia Foundation, which is a charity that works to end cruelty to animals in Asia. He is also patron of "All Dogs Matter", a dog rescue and rehoming charity in and around London and Norfolk. He is also an ambassador for the Limbe Wildlife Centre in Cameroon, a wildlife sanctuary for animals rescued from the illegal bushmeat and pet trades.

In May 2015, Egan became Patron of Chaldon Animal Sanctuary, a charity that offers homes for life for dogs and cats. Egan personally took one of the Bosnian dogs now named Crusoe to the sanctuary in May. Three months later, Egan was announced as patron of the science-based campaign For Life On Earth (FLOE), which fights against animal testing in the field of human medical research.

In January 2016, Egan participated in Veganuary, and has remained vegan.

In 2018 Peter Egan joined Animal Equality UK inside a foie gras farm in France to document the process of force-feeding. Since then, he has supported the animal protection organisation on its campaign to ban the import of foie gras made by force-feeding in the UK.

== Personal life ==
Egan was married to the actress Myra Frances for 49 years until her death from cancer on 30 March 2021. His stepdaughter is Rebecca Egan.

== Filmography ==
Year	Title	Role	Notes
1971	One Brief Summer	Bill Denton	
1973	The Hireling	Captain Hugh Cantrip	BAFTA Award for Most Promising Newcomer to Leading Film Roles
1974	Callan	Toby Meres	
1975	Hennessy	Williams	
1981	Chariots of Fire	Duke of Sutherland	
1997	Bean	Lord Walton	
2000	2001: A Space Travesty	Dr. Griffin Pratt	
2002	The King's Beard	King Cuthbert	voice
2004	The I Inside	Doctor Truman	
2005	The Wedding Date	Victor Ellis	
2005	Man to Man	Gyllenhaal	
2007	Death at a Funeral	Victor	
2012	When The Lights Went Out	Peter	
2013	National Theatre Live: People	Theodore	
2024	And Mrs	Derek	
2024	I Could Never Go Vegan	As "Executive Producer"	

== Television ==
Year	Title	Role	Notes
1967	The Troubleshooters	Reporter	Episode: "Who Buys Who?"
1968	ITV Playhouse	Peter Morris	Episode: "Murder: An Even Chance"
1969	Big Breadwinner Hog	Hog	Miniseries
1970-1974	BBC Play of the Month	Freddie/Faukland	2 episodes
1971	Elizabeth R	Earl of Southampton	Episode: "Sweet England's Pride"
1972	The Organization	Peshore	Miniseries
1972	Pathfinders	F/O Mike O'Farrell	Episode: "Our Daffodils Are Better Than Your Daffodils"
1975	The Love School	John Everett Millais	3 episodes
1977	Leap in the Dark	John Godley	Episode: "Dream Me a Winner"
1977	The Cedar Tree	Ralph Marsh	2 episodes
1978	Lillie	Oscar Wilde	9 episodes
1978-1984	Crown Court	Nigel Steed QC	2 serials
1979	Prince Regent	George IV	Miniseries
1981	Play for Today	Purdie	Episode: "Dear Brutus"
1982	Tales of the Unexpected	Keith	Episode: "Pattern of Guilt"
1983	Reilly, Ace of Spies	Fothergill	4 episodes
1983	The Dark Side of the Sun	Raoul Lavallière	Miniseries
1984	To Catch a King	Reinhard Heydrich	TV movie
1984–1989	Ever Decreasing Circles	Paul Ryman	
1985	A Woman of Substance	Adam Fairley	3 episodes
1986	Paradise Postponed	Henry Simcox	Miniseries
1987	A Perfect Spy	Magnus Pym	5 episodes
1989–1990	Joint Account	David Braithwaite	
1989	A Day in Summer	Jack Ruskin	TV movie
1990	Frederick Forsyth Presents	Dennis Gaunt	Episode: "The Price of the Bride"
1991-1994	The Ruth Rendell Mysteries	Rev. Henry Archery/Harry Blunden	2 serials
1994	The Chief	Simon Duval	1 episode
1994	MacGyver: Trail to Doomsday	Frederick Moran	TV movie
1995	Chiller	Richard Cramer	Episode: "The Man Who Didn't Believe in Ghosts"
1996	The Peacock Spring	Edward	TV movie
1996	Gobble	Mr. Villiers	TV movie
1998	The Cater Street Hangman	Edward Ellison	TV movie
1999	A Touch of Frost	Richard Darrow	Episode: "Private Lives"
1999	The Ambassador	Michael Cochrane	3 episodes
2003	The Inspector Lynley Mysteries	Dr. Trenarrow	Episode: "A Suitable Vengeance"
2004	My Family	Geoffrey Dutton	Episode: "Going Dental"
2005	Jericho	Philip Pickering	Episode: "The Hollow Men"
2005	Whatever Love Means	Prince Philip	TV movie
2006	Home Again	Graham	
2011-2018	Midsomer Murders	Grady Palmerston/Norman Swanscombe	2 episodes
2012-2015	Downton Abbey	Hugh 'Shrimpie' MacClare, Marquess of Flintshire	4 episodes
2013	Mount Pleasant	Party Attendee	1 episode
2014	Grantchester	Archie Johnson	1 episode
2014	Moving On	Eric	Episode: "Madge"
2017-18, 2021-23	Unforgotten	Martin Hughes	24 episodes
2018–2019	Hold the Sunset	Dr. Dugdale	13 episodes
2019	Four Weddings and a Funeral	Sidney Thorpe-Blood	Episode: "The Winner Takes It All"
2020–2022	After Life	Paul	6 episodes
2020	The Spanish Princess	Thomas Howard, 2nd Duke of Norfolk	3 episodes
2024	Truelove	David	Miniseries

== Video games ==
Year	Title	Role	Notes
2009	Forza Motorsport 3	Narrator	
2010	Dante's Inferno	King Richard I/The Bishop of Florence/Background Shade	
2011	Warhammer 40,000: Kill Team	Chapter Master	
2011	The Witcher 2: Assassins of Kings	King Henselt/Silgrat/Amerigo	English Dub
2011	Forza Motorsport 4	Narrator	
2012	Blades of Time	Vicar of Chaos/Gateguard/Skyguard Lieutenant/Dismal Swamp DLC	
2012	Professor Layton vs. Phoenix Wright: Ace Attorney	The Judge	English version
2014	Dragon Age: Inquisition	Lord Esmeral Abernache	
