= One Foot in the Grave =

British TV sitcom (1990–2000)

- Series title card
- Created by: David Renwick
- Written by: David Renwick
- Directed by: Sydney Lotterby (1990); Susan Belbin (1990–1996); Christine Gernon (1997–2000)
- Starring: Richard Wilson; Annette Crosbie; Doreen Mantle; Angus Deayton; Janine Duvitski; Owen Brenman
- Theme music composer: Eric Idle
- Opening theme: "One Foot in the Grave" by Eric Idle
- Composer: Ed Welch
- Country of origin: United Kingdom
- Original language: English
- No. of series: 6
- No. of episodes: 42 + 2 shorts (list of episodes)

Production
- Producers: Susan Belbin (1990–1996); Esta Charkham (1997); Jonathan P. Llewellyn (2000)
- Production locations: BBC Television centre. In and around Christchurch and Bournemouth, Dorset, England
- Running time: 27–92 minutes
- Production company: BBC

Original release
- Network: BBC One
- Release: 4 January 1990 – 20 November 2000

Related
- Cosby

One Foot in the Grave is a British television sitcom written by David Renwick. There were six series (each consisting of six half-hour episodes) and seven Christmas specials over a period of ten years from early 1990 to late 2000. The first five series were broadcast between January 1990 and January 1995. For the next five years, the show appeared only as Christmas specials, followed by the sixth and final series in 2000.

The series features the exploits of Victor Meldrew, played by Richard Wilson, and his long-suffering wife, Margaret, played by Annette Crosbie. Wilson initially turned down the part of Meldrew and David Renwick considered Les Dawson for the role, until Wilson changed his mind. The programmes invariably deal with Meldrew's battle against a long series of problems, some of which he creates for himself.

The location is set in an unnamed town in Southern England, where Victor takes involuntary early retirement. His various efforts to keep himself busy while encountering various misfortunes and misunderstandings are the themes of the sitcom. Indoor scenes were videotaped at BBC Television Centre with most exterior scenes filmed on Tresillian Way in Walkford in Christchurch, Dorset. Despite its traditional production, the series subverts its domestic sitcom setting with elements of black humour and surrealism.

The series was occasionally the subject of controversy for some of its darker story elements, but nevertheless received a number of awards, including the 1992 BAFTA for Best Comedy. The programme came 80th in the British Film Institute's 100 Greatest British Television Programmes. Four episodes were remade for BBC Radio 2. The series inspired a novel, published in 1992, featuring the most memorable moments from the first two series and the first Christmas special.

== Plot ==
The series features the exploits, mishaps and misadventures of irascible early retiree Victor Meldrew, who, after being made redundant from his job as a security guard at the age of 60, finds himself at war with the world and everything in it. Meldrew, cursed with misfortune and always complaining, is married to long-suffering wife Margaret, who is often left exasperated by his many misfortunes.

Amongst other witnesses to Victor's wrath are tactless family friend Jean Warboys and next-door neighbours Patrick (Victor's nemesis) and Pippa Trench. Patrick often discovers Victor in inexplicably bizarre or compromising situations, leading him to believe he is insane. The Meldrews' neighbour on the other side, overly cheery charity worker Nick Swainey, also adds to Victor's frustration.

Although set in a traditional suburban setting, the show subverts this genre with a strong overtone of black comedy. Series One's "The Valley of Fear" is an episode which caused controversy, when Victor found a frozen cat in his freezer. Writer David Renwick also combined farce with elements of tragedy. For example, and although there is no explicit reference to Victor and Margaret having children, the episode "Timeless Time" contained a reference to someone named Stuart; the strong implication being that they once had a son who had died as a child, and in the final episode, Victor is killed by a hit-and-run driver.

A number of episodes were also experimental in that they took place entirely in one setting. Such episodes include "The Beast in the Cage" (where Victor, Margaret and Mrs Warboys are stuck in a traffic jam), "Timeless Time" (where Victor and Margaret are in bed suffering insomnia), "The Trial" (where Victor is left alone in the house waiting to see if he has to take part in jury service), "Rearranging the Dust" (where Victor and Margaret have a long wait in their solicitor's waiting room), and "Threatening Weather" (where Victor and Margaret try to cope during a power cut on the hottest night of the year).

Despite Margaret's frequent exasperation with her husband's antics, the series shows the couple have a deep affection for one another.

== Episodes ==
Series
| Series | Episodes | Originally released | |
| Series | Episodes | First released | Last released |
|---|---|---|---|
| 1 | 6 | 4 January 1990 | 8 February 1990 |
| 2 | 6 | 4 October 1990 | 15 November 1990 |
| 2 | Special | 27 December 1990 | |
| 3 | Special | 30 December 1991 | |
| 3 | 6 | 2 February 1992 | 8 March 1992 |
| 4 | 6 | 31 January 1993 | 7 March 1993 |
| 4 | Special | 26 December 1993 | |
| 5 | Special | 25 December 1994 | |
| 5 | 5 | 1 January 1995 | 29 January 1995 |
| 5 | Special | 25 December 1995 | |
| Specials | | 25 December 1996 | 25 December 1997 |
| 6 | 6 | 16 October 2000 | 20 November 2000 |

== Characters ==
From left to right: Janine Duvitski, Angus Deayton, Annette Crosbie, Richard Wilson

=== Main characters ===
- Victor Meldrew (Richard Wilson) – Victor is the main protagonist of the sitcom and finds himself constantly battling against all that life throws at him as he becomes entangled in complicated misfortunes and farcical situations. Renwick once pointed out in an interview that the name "Victor" was ironic, since he almost always ends up a loser. From being buried alive to being prosecuted for attacking a feisty pit bull terrier with a collection of coconut meringues, Victor tries to adjust to life after an automatic security system made him redundant at the office where he worked as a security guard, but to no avail. He believes everything is going wrong for him all the time and he has the right to be upset because it is always someone else's fault. Victor does not see himself as retired and is always trying to find another job, but most of his attempts end in failure.

Victor is a tragic comedy character and sympathy is directed towards him as he becomes embroiled in complex misunderstandings, bureaucratic vanity and, at times, sheer bad luck. The audience sees a philosophical ebb and flow to his character, however, along with a degree of optimism. Yet his polite façade collapses when events get the better of him and a full verbal onslaught is forthcoming. "Victor-isms" include "I do not believe it!", "I don't believe it!", "Un-be-lievable!", "What in the name of bloody hell?", "In the name of sanity!" Despite his grumpy demeanour Victor isn't totally devoid of compassion; in "Hearts of Darkness" he liberates elderly nursing home residents who were being mistreated by the staff, and in "Descent into The Maelstrom" he calls an incident room number and gives the location of an emotionally disturbed woman who abducted a baby and stole Margaret's mother's pearl earrings, which resulted in the woman being picked up by the police. However, because the woman was a friend of Margaret, and knowing she meant a lot to her, Victor never said anything.

Victor has also shown a vast amount of loyalty to Margaret as, throughout their entire 42 years of lifelong marriage together, not once has the thought of infidelity ever occurred to him. In "Rearranging the Dust", Victor and Margaret recollect the days of their courtship at a party after which Victor says "You were always my first choice", which leaves Margaret stunned. In another episode, Margaret recounts the time Victor took her to the funfair and they ended up getting stuck in the hall of mirrors for over an hour. Victor had said he did not mind as he was happy to stay there and look at all the reflections of her. Victor's very best act of compassion comes in the episode "The Wisdom of the Witch" in which he ends up saving Patrick's life from his new secretary's psychopathic boyfriend by forcing Patrick's would-be murderer, along with himself as well, out of the window of the house in which they are trapped during a snowstorm.

- Margaret Meldrew (née Pellow) (Annette Crosbie) – Victor's long-suffering, tolerant and kind-hearted wife. Margaret tries to maintain a degree of calmness and to rise above her husband's antics. However, she is often engulfed in these follies, mishaps and confusion and often vents her anger at Victor. In early episodes, her character acts more as a comic foil to Victor's misfortunes. Examples include fearfully asking if a cat found frozen in their freezer is definitely dead and mentioning a friend who died of a terminal illness. When Victor reminds her that the woman actually fell from a cliff, Margaret retorts she only did so because "she went to the seaside to convalesce".

In later episodes, Margaret develops into a more complex character. She is shown to be fiercely protective of her marriage to Victor by becoming easily suspicious and jealous—for example, of a Dutch marionette that Victor becomes occupied with repairing in the episode "Hole in the Sky", eventually leading her to destroy it. In "The Affair of the Hollow Lady", a greengrocer (played by Barbara Windsor) develops a soft spot for Victor and tries to convince Margaret that he has been unfaithful to her. In revenge, Margaret assaults her with a pair of boxing gloves. However, Margaret herself is shown to have contemplated infidelity with a man called Ben whom she met on holiday in the episode "Warm Champagne". She decides against cheating on Victor. In this episode, she sums up her relationship with Victor by telling Ben, "He's the most sensitive person I've ever met and that's why I love him and why I constantly want to ram his head through a television screen." She also begins to develop a sense of cynicism, slowly coming to see the world the way Victor sees it. This is especially evident in "Things Aren't Simple Anymore" in which she remarks that the world is "all speed and greed" and that "nobody does anything about anything". In "Rearranging the Dust", Margaret recounts the time she first chose Victor at a party and, during a power cut, "shared their bodies" in the garden. After this moment of passion, they went back inside and when the lights came back on, Margaret realised that she had "grabbed hold of the wrong person". Margaret's demeanour seemed to stem from an incident at school when she was a child. When she was five, she had two budgies; one day when she opened the door of their cage, one flew straight out and hit the window, killing itself, while the other stayed in the cage despite her best efforts to get it to come out. The next day at school her teacher asked the class to write a story about something that had happened to them so Margaret wrote her story about the budgies. Her teacher made Margaret read it out loud in front of the whole class which resulted in everyone laughing at her. She then realised that the teacher had done it deliberately just to be cruel to her—whereupon she understood why the other budgie never wanted to leave its cage.

Margaret could be said to have a catchphrase, typically a long, exasperated use of the word "God", usually when coming to a realisation about the reason behind one of Victor's mishaps. These mishaps are occasionally inadvertently aided by herself in some way, such as leaving the phone off the hook or giving permission to someone to enter the Meldrews' house when she is not there. Margaret works at a florist's until series five, when the shop closes. In a later series she has found a new job as a caregiver for the elderly, where she inadvertently discovers on a TV documentary that she has actually been unwittingly used as a sex worker by a man who did not need personal care but just enjoyed being bathed and dressed anyway. It is presumed that she left the job after making this discovery, as it is never mentioned again.

=== Supporting characters ===
- Jean Warboys (Doreen Mantle) – Mrs Warboys is a friend of Margaret's (and a rather annoying one in Victor's eyes) who has attached herself to the Meldrews, accompanying them on many of their exploits. Until the fourth series she is married to (unseen) Chris until he leaves her for a private detective she had hired, believing he was having an affair, and they divorce. They have at least one dog, Harold, who discovers a hand grenade that Mrs Warboys later uses as protection in "The Valley of Fear".

She often bears the brunt of Victor's temper due to muddled misunderstandings and in part due to her aloof nature. One such occasion saw Victor asking her to pick up a suit of his from the dry-cleaners, only for her to return with a gorilla suit. Another occasion saw her persuading Victor to take on a dog whose owner had just died. Victor spent time building a kennel in the garden and when Mrs Warboys arrives with the dog, she forgets to mention that the dog is stuffed, much to Victor and Margaret's consternation. On another occasion she wins a competition where the prize is either £500 or to have a life-size waxwork model made of herself; she chooses the waxwork, which had to be delivered to the Meldrews' house. As it turns out, she hates it as much as Victor and Margaret do, and the waxwork ends up in the dustbin.
Despite being friends, she has driven Margaret to distraction on several occasions, most notably in "Only a Story", when she stayed with the Meldrews after her flat had been flooded and enraged Margaret with her complaining and laziness. Jean is also shown as a somewhat absent-minded character, as she has a pet cockatiel despite her lifelong allergy to feathers. She would often bore the Meldrews by showing them her complete collection of holiday pictures at the most unwelcome times. A running joke is her beating Victor at board games, including Trivial Pursuit and chess, while having a conversation with someone else. Doreen Mantle described her character as "wanting to do the right thing but always finding out that it was the wrong thing". Victor's annoyance with her is often demonstrated by shouting her name, sometimes repeatedly, in an impatient tone.

- Patrick Trench (Angus Deayton) – Patrick and his wife Pippa live next door to Victor from the second series. Patrick often catches Victor engrossed in seemingly preposterous situations, all of which in context are perfectly innocuous. The couple's relationship with their neighbours begins badly after Victor mistakes Patrick and Pippa for distant relations when they arrive outside with three suitcases – not realising that they are his next-door neighbours, having been on a lengthy holiday from the day Victor and Margaret moved in. Victor subsequently invites the bemused pair to stay; this and later incidents cause Patrick to suspect that Victor is quite insane, possibly bordering on malicious.

However, Patrick's rift with Victor eventually transforms him into a rather cynical character (much like Victor) and he often responds to him in similarly petty or vindictive ways as a means of trying to settle the score, such as writing complaints and grievances on Post-it Notes. This aspect of Patrick's character came to a head in the episode "The Executioner's Song" where his face temporarily morphs into that of Victor's as he looks into a mirror.

It is mentioned several times that Patrick would like to have children. After Pippa miscarries and Patrick is, so he claims, rendered infertile by a freak accident (for which he unfairly blames Victor), he adopts a dachshund called Denzil, which Pippa describes as his "baby substitute". Denzil frequently appears with Patrick through series 3–5. Despite their animosity towards each other, Victor ends up saving Patrick's life in "The Wisdom of the Witch".

- Pippa Trench (née Croker) (Janine Duvitski) – Patrick's wife – a bus driver – sought friendly relations with the Meldrews and, after a while, became good friends with Margaret. The two women usually attempt to get their husbands to make peace with each other at least once per series. Eventually Patrick proposes that the Trenches move house, but they soon realise that the Meldrew curse has followed them: Victor sent workmen to their home, thinking they were removal men who had initially come to the wrong house. They were in fact from a house clearance firm Margaret had employed to clear her late cousin Ursula's country mansion. The workmen consequently cleared Patrick and Pippa's house of their entire furniture and sold it for a mere £475. Pippa is slightly dim-witted (Victor once described her as a "gormless twerp" on an answering machine message, unaware she was listening) – for example, believing Victor had murdered an elderly blind man simply because the victim had been found clutching a double-one domino in his hand and Victor had two pimples on his nose.

New neighbours Derek and Betty McVitie replaced the Trenches for the 1997 special "Endgame". However, this turned out to be their only appearances in the series and they were said to have emigrated by the penultimate episode, which caused Nick Swainey to leap straight in with the offer for their old house. Series six saw the Trenches return as prominent characters, albeit living in a house some distance from the Meldrews. Despite appearing in five out of six series and three Christmas specials, neither of the Trenches ever share a scene with Mrs Warboys and Pippa only ever shares one scene with Nick Swainey (in the episode "Who Will Buy?").

- Nick Swainey (Owen Brenman) – The excessively cheerful and often oblivious Mr Swainey appeared in the first episode, encouraging Victor to join his OAPs' trip to Eastbourne and being greeted with Victor's trademark abuse. When the Meldrews move house, they discover he is their neighbour, living on the other side of the Meldrews from the Trenches. He remains continuously optimistic; even his being told to "piss off" by Victor is laughed off. Despite this run-in he later befriends Victor and they frequently chat in their gardens, where Victor is often surprised by Mr Swainey's activities, ranging from archery and preparing amateur dramatics props, to bizarre games he arranges for his senile, bedridden mother, whom the audience never actually see. Despite his cheery demeanour, he does occasionally drop his guard, once displaying apparent depression at being nothing more than "an overgrown Boy Scout". Following his mother's death, he moved house near the end of the series, but only went as far as the Trenches'/McVities' old house, claiming he had "always wanted to live in an end house, without leaving the area". This took Victor by surprise; he did not learn where Mr Swainey was moving to until, while reminiscing in the garden about his departure, Mr Swainey suddenly appeared from the other side.

=== Other characters ===
- Ronnie and Mildred (Gordon Peters and Barbara Ashcroft) – Ronnie and Mildred were a constantly cheerful, but incredibly boring, couple who provided yet another annoyance to the Meldrews, who dreaded any upcoming visits to them; Victor once said that he had hoped they were both dead. In "The Worst Horror of All", when the couple attempted a surprise visit, the Meldrews hid in their house to give the impression they were away on holiday and then took the phone off the hook for several days afterwards, though these efforts to avoid them were in vain. They are referenced a number of times in the series for giving the Meldrews bizarre and always unwanted presents that are seldom opened, usually involving a garish photograph of themselves. In the final series, however it was clear that their cheerfulness was a façade and, in a particularly dark scene, Mildred hanged herself "during a game of Happy Families". The shot of Mildred's feet dangling outside the window is usually cut from pre-watershed screenings.
- Alfred Meldrew (Richard Pearson) - Victor's absent-minded brother, who lives in New Zealand. During the episode "The Broken Reflection", he comes to visit after 25 years, to the disdain of Victor. Alfred is an eccentric character, often walking around with his hat on fire and bringing over his and Victor's great-grandfather's skull. He is a clumsy character too, mistaking the table cloth for a napkin and dropping the entire contents of the table all over the floor when he stands up and breaking a mirror in the middle of the night after mistaking his own reflection for a burglar. Victor starts to warm to Alfred towards the end of his visit, but Alfred leaves early the next day after finding an unpleasant message about him that Victor had accidentally recorded on a dictaphone. He is not seen again, but keeps in touch with the Meldrews, as Victor is seen looking at some photographs Alfred had sent over in "The Trial".
- Cousin Wilfred (John Rutland) – Mrs. Warboys' cousin Wilfred, first appeared in an episode in the third series. In the final series the character returned, but the effects of a stroke had rendered him mute and forced him to "speak" with the aid of an electronic voice generator. His poor typing on the generator led to several misunderstandings, such as asking Victor for a "bra of soup" (as opposed to a "bar of soap") and describing a visit to his "brothel" (as opposed to "brother").
- Great Aunt Joyce and Uncle Dick – unseen characters, they are sometimes mentioned by Victor and Margaret, as an aging, grim couple whom Victor and Margaret dread having anything to do with. Great Aunt Joyce is mentioned as having a glass eye and has the habit of knitting bizarre items (such as six-fingered gloves) for Victor. Uncle Dick has a wooden arm; in the final Comic Relief (2001) episode, it transpires that a nurse had mistakenly placed a drip in the false arm for 18 hours after a trip to hospital after trying to remove a kidney stone with a wire coat hanger.
- Mimsy Berkovitz – another unseen character, she is the local agony aunt, whom many of the characters turn to for advice. In the episode "The Secret of the Seven Sorcerers", Patrick is heard talking to her on the radio, seeking her advice on how to cope when Victor and Margaret invite him and Pippa around to dinner.
- Mrs Birkett (Gabrielle Blunt) – an elderly neighbour in the first series. She accidentally gets trapped in the Meldrews' loft when Victor closes the trap door whilst she is up there looking for jumble that Margaret has prepared. She continues to be mentioned throughout the rest of the series but is not seen again.
- Martin Trout (Peter Cook) – a paparazzo in the 1993 Christmas special "One Foot in the Algarve". He manages to take a number of compromising photographs involving a high-ranking politician. Trout compares the potential impact of the photos to the Profumo affair. On his way to sell the images, he loses the roll of film whilst arguing at a phone box with the Meldrews and subsequently pursues them across the Algarve to retrieve it. He suffers a number of disasters both related and unrelated to Victor and Margaret's own misfortunes, only to find that the film had actually fallen into the lining of his jacket and had been with him for much of his journey. He lost it in the door of the Meldrews' car. Retrieving the roll after a brief spell in hospital, Trout attempts to leave the Algarve in a taxi but is involved in a car crash.

== Production ==
The production of the show was in a conventional sitcom format, with episodes taped live in front of a studio audience, interposed with pre-filmed location material.

The series' opening credits were designed by Pete Wane and feature footage of a "Galapagos Giant Tortoise", at the request of writer David Renwick, which "[serves] as a metaphor for grumpy old Victor Meldrew." Wane found the footage of the creature to be "not very upbeat visually for a comedy," but he found, "to [his] relief a shot of it stumbling on a rock which gave the sequence a bit of a lift."

Most of the first five series of One Foot in the Grave were produced and directed by Susan Belbin, the exceptions being "Love and Death", which was partly directed by veteran sitcom director Sydney Lotterby and "Starbound", for which Gareth Gwenlan (who in fact had originally commissioned the series in 1989) stepped in to direct some sequences after Belbin was taken ill. Afterward, Belbin retired owing to ill-health, and the final series was produced by Jonathan P. Llewellyn and directed by Christine Gernon. Wilson and Renwick felt that Gernon's experience of working with Belbin on earlier series of One Foot as a production secretary and assistant, as well as other shows, meant that her style was similar to Belbin's, aiding the transition between directors.

The show used Bournemouth to film some exterior sequences because of its favourable climate, easy access to London and economical benefits relative to filming in the capital. After the first series was filmed, the house—near Pokesdown, Bournemouth—which had been used for the Meldrews' house in location sequences, changed hands and the new owners demanded nearly triple the usage fees that the previous owners had asked for. Rather than agree to this, the production team decided to find a new house and the first episode of the second series was rewritten to have the Meldrews' house destroyed in a fire (this was filmed on waste ground in Northcote Road, Springbourne). This also gave the opportunity for a new interior set to be designed, as Belbin had been unhappy with the original set designed for the series, which she felt was too restrictive to shoot in.

Beginning with series two, the exterior scenes of the Meldrew's home were filmed at Tresillian Way, Walkford, near Christchurch in Dorset. These later series make extensive use of specific street and garden locations in most episodes, particularly for scenes involving the Meldrew's neighbours. Most outside locations were filmed in and around Bournemouth and Christchurch. These include Richmond Hill, Undercliff Drive and Boscombe Pier, Bournemouth Town Hall, Lansdowne College, Christchurch Hospital and the former Royal Victoria Hospital (Boscombe). Later episodes, such as "Hearts of Darkness", were filmed entirely on location. Victor's death by a hit and run driver in the final episode was filmed at Shawford railway station, Hampshire. Fans left floral tributes at the site.

Over the show's history, it featured a number of notable comic actors in one-off roles. These include Susie Blake, John Bird, Tim Brooke-Taylor, Peter Cook, Diana Coupland, Phil Daniels, Edward de Souza, Hannah Gordon, Georgina Hale, Roy Hudd, Jimmy Jewel, Rula Lenska, Stephen Lewis, Paul Merton, Brian Murphy, Christopher Ryan, Jim Sweeney, Barbara Windsor, Joan Sims and Ray Winstone. Two of Angus Deayton's former Radio Active and KYTV co-stars, Geoffrey Perkins and Michael Fenton Stevens were cast, in separate episodes, as respectively the brother and brother-in-law of Deayton's character. A few actors little-known at the time also appeared in one-off roles before going on to greater fame, including Lucy Davis, Joanna Scanlan, Eamonn Walker and Arabella Weir.

David Renwick did not approve of the cast ad-libbing.

== Music ==
The One Foot in the Grave theme song was written, composed and sung by Eric Idle. A longer version was produced for the special "One Foot in the Algarve", released as a single with five remixes and a karaoke version in November 1994. Idle included a live version of the song on his album Eric Idle Sings Monty Python. It is preluded by a similar adaptation of "Bread of Heaven" to that used in the episode "The Beast in the Cage" by disgruntled car mechanics. The title music on the TV series is accompanied at the beginning and end of each episode by footage of Galápagos tortoises.

The series also made extensive use of incidental music, composed by Ed Welch, which often hinted at a particular genre to fit the mood of the scenes, frequently incorporating well-known pieces of music such as "God Rest You Merry, Gentlemen" or Intermezzo from Jean Sibelius' Karelia Suite. In the Christmas special "Endgame" during Margaret's alleged death scene, a compilation of clips from past episodes are accompanied by the song "River Runs Deep" performed by J. J. Cale. The final episode ended with a montage of some of the mishaps Victor encountered, which were mentioned in the episode – backed by "End of the Line" by the Traveling Wilburys.

== Awards ==
The programme received a number of prestigious awards. In 1992, it won a BAFTA as Best Comedy (Programme or Series). During its ten-year run, the series was nominated a further six times. Richard Wilson also won Best Light Entertainment Performance in 1992 and 1994 and Annette Crosbie was nominated for the same award in 1994.

The series also won the Best Television Sitcom in 1992 from the Royal Television Society and the British Comedy Award for Best Sitcom in 1992, 1995 and 2001.

In 2004, One Foot in the Grave came tenth in a BBC poll to find "Britain's Best Sitcom" with 31,410 votes. The programme also came 80th in the British Film Institute's 100 Greatest British Television Programmes.

Award list
| Year | Ceremony | Category | Nominee(s) | Result | Ref. |
|---|---|---|---|---|---|
| 1991 | BAFTA Television Awards | Comedy Series | Susan Belbin; David Renwick | Nominated | |
| 1991 | British Comedy Awards | Best TV Comedy Actor | Richard Wilson | Won | |
| 1992 | BAFTA Television Awards | Light Entertainment Performance | Richard Wilson | Won | |
| 1992 | BAFTA Television Awards | Comedy – Programme or Series | Susan Belbin; David Renwick | Won | |
| 1992 | British Comedy Awards | Best Sitcom | One Foot in the Grave | Won | |
| 1992 | Royal Television Society Awards | Best Situation Comedy | Episode: "The Man in the Long Black Coat" | Won | |
| 1993 | BAFTA Television Awards | Comedy – Programme or Series | Susan Belbin; David Renwick | Nominated | |
| 1993 | BAFTA Television Awards | Light Entertainment Performance | Richard Wilson | Nominated | |
| 1993 | British Comedy Awards | Best BBC Sitcom | One Foot in the Grave | Won | |
| 1994 | BAFTA Television Awards | Light Entertainment Performance | Richard Wilson (Episode: "One Foot in the Algarve") | Won | |
| 1994 | BAFTA Television Awards | Light Entertainment Performance | Annette Crosbie (Episode: "One Foot in the Algarve") | Nominated | |
| 1994 | Royal Television Society Awards | Best Situation Comedy | | Won | |
| 1995 | BAFTA Television Awards | Comedy – Programme or Series | Susan Belbin; David Renwick | Nominated | |
| 1995 | BAFTA Television Awards | Best Comedy Performance | Richard Wilson | Nominated | |
| 1995 | BAFTA Television Awards | Best Comedy Performance | Annette Crosbie | Nominated | |
| 1995 | British Comedy Awards | Best BBC Comedy Series | One Foot in the Grave | Won | |
| 1995 | British Comedy Awards | Top TV Comedy Actress | Annette Crosbie | Nominated | |
| 1996 | BAFTA Television Awards | Best Comedy – Programme or Series | Susan Belbin; David Renwick | Nominated | |
| 1996 | BAFTA Television Awards | Best Comedy Performance | Richard Wilson | Nominated | |
| 1996 | Royal Television Society Awards | Best Lighting, Photography and Camera - Lighting for Multicamera | Martin Kempton; Chris Kempton | Nominated | |
| 1997 | British Comedy Awards | Best BBC Sitcom | Episode: "Endgame" | Won | |
| 1998 | BAFTA Television Awards | Comedy – Programme or Series | Esta Charkham; Christine Gernon; David Renwick | Nominated | |
| 1998 | BAFTA Television Awards | Comedy Performance | Richard Wilson | Nominated | |
| 1998 | British Comedy Awards | People's Choice Award | One Foot in the Grave | Won | |
| 1998 | BPG Awards | Writer's Award | One Foot in the Grave – David Renwick (tied with Jonathan Creek) | Won | |
| 1998 | Royal Television Society Awards | Best Lighting, Photography and Camera - Lighting for Multicamera | Chris Kempton | Won | |
| 2001 | BAFTA Television Awards | Situation Comedy | Jonathan Paul Llewellyn; Christine Gernon; David Renwick | Nominated | |
| 2001 | British Comedy Awards | Best TV Comedy | One Foot in the Grave | Won | |
| 2001 | National Television Awards | Most Popular Comedy Programme | One Foot in the Grave | Nominated | |
| 2001 | National Television Awards | Most Popular Comedy Performer | Richard Wilson | Nominated | |
| 2001 | Royal Television Society Awards | Best Situation Comedy/Comedy Drama | One Foot in the Grave | Nominated | |

== Controversies ==
A number of complaints were made during the series' run for its depiction of animal deaths. For example, in the episode "The Valley of Fear", a dead cat is found in the Meldrews' freezer; in another, a tortoise is roasted in a brazier. However, this was later cited as a positive feature of the programme's daring scripts in Britain's Best Sitcom by its advocate Rowland Rivron. The programme was censored, however, for a scene in the episode "Hearts of Darkness" in which an elderly resident is abused in an old people's home and, following complaints, the scene was slightly cut when the episode was repeated. In the DVD commentary for the episode, David Renwick stated his continued opposition to the cuts. Another controversial scene in the episode "Tales of Terror" saw the Meldrews visit Ronnie and Mildred on the understanding that Mildred had gone upstairs during a game of Happy Families and not returned; Ronnie then shows her feet hanging outside of the window, revealing that she has ended her life by suicide. The Broadcasting Standards Commission received complaints about this scene.

When the final episode, "Things Aren't Simple Any More" originally aired on 20 November 2000 at 9pm, it coincided with the broadcast of the first jackpot winner in the British version of Who Wants to Be a Millionaire?, which had been filmed the Sunday before the broadcast and the news leaked to the press. ITV was accused of engineering this in order to damage the final episode's expected high ratings, but was later cleared by the Independent Television Commission.

== Cultural impact ==
Due to the series' popularity, people who constantly complain and are irritated by minor things are often compared to Victor Meldrew by the British media. Renwick disputes this usage however, claiming that Victor's reactions are entirely in proportion to the things that happen to him.

Renwick integrated some of the plots and dialogue from the series into a novel, which was first published by BBC Books in 1992. A second novel, One Foot in the Grave and Counting, was published in 2021. Renwick also adapted four episodes for BBC Radio 2, which first aired between 21 January 1995 and 11 February 1995. The episodes are "Alive and Buried", "In Luton Airport, No One Can Hear You Scream", "Timeless Time" and "The Beast in the Cage". They are regularly repeated on the digital speech station BBC Radio 4 Extra and are available on audio CD.

Wilson dislikes saying his character's catchphrase ("I don't believe it!") and only performs the line for charity events for a small fee. This became a joke in the actor's guest appearance as himself in the Father Ted episode "The Mainland", where Ted annoys him by constantly repeating his catchphrase. The situation was conceived when Father Ted writers Graham Linehan and Arthur Mathews sat behind Wilson at a performance of Le Cirque du Soleil at the Royal Albert Hall. They considered how "tasteless and wrong" it would be to lean forward to him every time that an acrobat did a stunt and yell the catchphrase and then they realised that that was exactly what their fictional priests would do. This was also played upon when Wilson made a guest appearance on the comedy TV quiz show Shooting Stars, in which Vic Reeves and Bob Mortimer purposefully misquoted his catchphrase by referring to him as "Richard 'I don't believe you' Wilson".

=== One Foot in the Grave – 30 Years Of Laughs ===
In April 2023, Channel 5 aired a 67-minute special retrospective for their "Comedy Classics" series. Cast, crew and celebrities discuss and pay tribute to the show. The documentary features an interview with Wilson, sharing his memories of the show, along with other cast members Angus Deayton and Doreen Mantle (who was 96 years old at the time) and director Christine Gernon.

== VHS and DVD releases ==
All six series and specials were initially available on BBC Worldwide VHS video tapes during the late 1990s and early 2000s. The Comic Relief Shorts from 1993 and 2001 have not been released on DVD. A One Foot in the Grave Very Best of DVD featuring five of the greatest episodes was released on 22 October 2001 in Region 2. Then on 8 July 2004, a One Foot in the Grave Very Best of was also released in Region 4. Each series was gradually released on DVD in Region 2 between 2004 and 2006, with a complete series 1-6 box set towards the end of 2006. A slimmer series 1-6 box set was released in 2010 in Region 2.

Standard sets
| Series | Release date | | | Features |
| Series | Region 1 | Region 2 | Region 4 | Features |
|---|---|---|---|---|
| Series 1 | 27 March 2007 | 2 August 2004 | 7 July 2005 | 6 episodes; 1 disc; Includes Britain's Best Sitcom featurette; BBFC rating: PG; ACB rating: PG |
| Series 2 | 27 March 2007 | 9 May 2005 | 4 May 2006 | 6 episodes + 1990 Christmas special; 2 discs; BBFC rating: PG; ACB rating: PG |
| Series 3 | 11 March 2008 | 8 August 2005 | 17 August 2006 | 6 episodes + 1991 Christmas special; Commentary on "The Beast in the Cage" with David Renwick and Richard Wilson; 2 discs; BBFC rating: PG; ACB rating: PG |
| Series 4 | 11 March 2008 | 24 April 2006 | 7 March 2007 | 6 episodes + 1993 Christmas special; Commentary on "Hearts of Darkness" with David Renwick and Richard Wilson; 2 discs; BBFC rating: PG; ACB rating: M |
| Series 5 | 10 February 2009 | 21 August 2006 | 1 August 2007 | 5 episodes + 1994 & 1995 Christmas special; Commentary on "The Man Who Blew Away" with David Renwick and Richard Wilson; 2 discs; BBFC rating: 12 |
| Series 6 | 10 February 2009 | 16 October 2006 | 3 October 2007 | 6 episodes; Includes "I Don't Believe It – The Story of One Foot in the Grave"; Includes "Killing Victor" featurette by Owen Brenman; Commentary on "The Executioner's Song" with David Renwick and Richard Wilson; 2 discs; BBFC rating: 12 |

Specials, compilations and complete sets
| Set | Release date | | | Features |
| Set | Region 1 | Region 2 | Region 4 | Features |
|---|---|---|---|---|
| The Very Best Of | No release | 22 October 2001 | 8 July 2004 | 6 episodes; 1 disc; Includes; BBFC rating: 12; ACB rating: M |
| Series 1–6 | 8 September 2009 | 16 October 2006 | 5 March 2008 | 42 episodes; 12 discs; Includes 1990, 1991, 1993, 1994, 1995, 1996 & 1997 Christmas specials; Same special features as individual sets; BBFC rating: 12; ACB rating: M |
| The Christmas Specials | 8 September 2009 | 13 November 2006 | 6 November 2008 | 2 episodes; 1 disc; Included 1996 & 1997 Christmas specials; BBFC rating: 12; ACB rating: PG |
| Series 1–6 (repackage) | No release | 4 October 2010 | 7 April 2011 | 42 episodes; 12 discs; Includes 1990, 1991, 1993, 1994, 1995, 1996 & 1997 Christmas specials; Same special features as individual sets; BBFC rating: 12; ACB rating: M; The set was issued again on Region 4 Australia on 28 May 2014 |
| Series 1–6 (HMV Exclusive) | No release | 13 November 2017 | No release | 42 episodes; 12 discs; Includes 1990, 1991, 1993, 1994, 1995, 1996 & 1997 Christmas specials; Same special features as individual sets; BBFC rating: 12 |

== Foreign versions ==
=== One Leg in the Grave ===
A German version was made of the series in 1996–97, Mit einem Bein im Grab (One Leg in the Grave), directed by Thomas Nennstiel and Frank Strecker. It was broadcast on Das Erste. It starred Heinz Schubert as "Viktor Bölkhoff", Brigitte Böttrich as "Margret Bölkhoff" and Irm Hermann as "Lisbeth Albermann".

=== A Foot in the Grave ===
A Swedish version, En fot i graven (A Foot in the Grave) was made in 2001. Produced by commercial television channel TV4 and aired on SVT, it starred Gösta Ekman as "Victor Melldrov" and Lena Söderblom as his wife. A total of 12 episodes were broadcast.

=== With One Foot in the Grave ===
In 2006 a Dutch version was made under the title Met één been in het graf (With One Foot in the Grave) airing on NCRV. It starred Serge Henri Valcke as Victor Monter. The series was directed by Zdenek Kraus, who had directed the highly successful series Toen Was Geluk Heel Gewoon (Then Happiness Was Common, based on the American sitcom The Honeymooners) and was adapted for Dutch television by Ger Apeldoorn and Harm Edens, who also wrote Het Zonnetje in Huis. The series only lasted one series.

=== Cosby ===
The American version, Cosby, ran on CBS from 1996 to 2000. Named after its star Bill Cosby (whose character was named Hilton Lucas), it was a looser and lighter adaptation, with Renwick listed as a consultant.

== See also ==
- Waiting for God (TV series)
