= Victor Meldrew =

Fictional character in One Foot in the Grave

- One Foot in the Grave character
- Victor Meldrew as seen in the first episode of One Foot in the Grave
- Portrayed by: Richard Wilson
- Duration: 1990–2000
- First appearance: "Alive and Buried" (4 January 1990)
- Last appearance: "Things Aren't Simple Any More" (20 November 2000)
- Created by: David Renwick
- Introduced by: Susan Belbin
In-universe information
- Other names: Victor Thomas Meldrew
- Occupation: Security guard (retired)
- Father: Victor Meldrew Sr.
- Brothers: Alfred Meldrew
- Wife: Margaret Pellow (1958–2000; his death)
- Sons: Stuart Meldrew
- Uncles: George
- Aunts: Gertie
- First cousins: Geoffrey; Lucy; Ivor; Roger

Victor Meldrew is a fictional character in the BBC One sitcom One Foot in the Grave, created by David Renwick and portrayed by Richard Wilson. The character epitomised the archetypal grumpy old man. Meldrew is a foil for the bothersome aspects of children, cars, animals, power cuts and next-door neighbours.

The character was created specifically for Wilson, with whom Renwick had worked on the series Hot Metal, though Wilson initially turned the part down as at 53, he felt he was too young to play the 60-year-old Meldrew. Renwick considered Les Dawson for the part before Wilson changed his mind.

Victor is the only character to appear in every episode of the show.

== Character ==
In the first episode, Meldrew, aged 60, is forced into early retirement from his job as a security guard when the office where he worked installs an automatic security system (which he describes as "being replaced by a box"). The series follows Meldrew as he tries to fill his new-found leisure with odd jobs and unusual idiosyncrasies, or to get a new job. However, he regularly finds himself mistreated, misunderstood or simply the victim of bad luck, and consequently leads to his complaining heartily.

Meldrew is famous for his catchphrase, "I don't believe it!!". Other frequently used expressions of exasperation are "Unbe-lieeeve-able!", "What in the name of bloody hell?!" and "In the name of sanity!" Victor is something of a hypochondriac, keeping a medical dictionary with him to look up every ailment he believes has befallen him (Margaret describes it as "browsing through to see what he can die of next").

The series was so successful that in the United Kingdom, "Victor Meldrew" has become a byword for a bitter and complaining elderly man. However, both Renwick and Wilson himself have disagreed that Victor is an example of this stereotype and he is shown to be more of a tragicomedy character, not bitter and grumpy by nature, but driven to it due to his habit of attracting trouble. Renwick once pointed out in an interview that the name "Victor" is ironic, since he almost always ends up as the loser.

In the final episode, "Things Aren't Simple Any More", Meldrew is killed by a hit-and-run driver. This eliminated any realistic possibility of a seventh series. Passers-by left bouquets of flowers in homage at the filming location, a railway bridge in Shawford, a small village in Hampshire.

== Reception ==
Phil Wickham of the University of Exeter observed that "the whole point of the series is that Meldrew is the only sane voice in a mad world".

Jonathan Bignell in his book Media Semiotics observes that the reason people laugh at Victor Meldrew is not simply that his behaviour is excessive, but that it contrasts with how all the other characters in the TV series are behaving.

Meldrew's name is associated with aggression or grumpiness; the journal Age and Ageing notes that "Viewers of Victor Meldrew (One Foot in the Grave) would not be surprised that hostility contributes to mortality in grumpy old men." Similarly, The Daily Telegraph uses Richard Wilson's Meldrew to refer to people who enjoy "a good moan", while Jenny Turner in the London Review of Books can observe that "the timing and rhythm (of Geoff Dyer's Jeff in Venice, Death in Varanasi) have the flippancy of stand-up comedy. The voice has Eeyore in it, and Morrissey and Victor Meldrew, and could only be English and from that postwar, post-punk generation".

The BBC recalls first that "the role of Victor Meldrew transformed Scottish TV-actor Richard Wilson into a household name and award-winning comedy performer." In addition, "So popular was his character that 'Victor Meldrew' has endured as a cultural reference for any grumpy old man." And finally and more loosely, "many viewers identified with his rages at the irritants of modern life: litter, junk mail, traffic, rudeness, streetlamps and car mechanics and to some, Victor Meldrew was a champion of the people, albeit a very grumpy one."

Meldrew's persona is so powerful that Richard Wilson is perceived as "99 per cent Meldrew" by at least one critic, and when taking on a serious role as Malvolio in Shakespeare's Twelfth Night, another critic felt that Wilson's "performance was overly influenced by his desire to 'shed the Victor Meldrew stereotype'".

In the modern series of Doctor Who, after the debut of the Twelfth Doctor, as portrayed by Peter Capaldi, Alison Graham of the Radio Times compared Capaldi's Doctor to Meldrew, as both were "abrasive, acerbic and [have] no truck with modern life".

The third series of the Channel 4 comedy Father Ted features Wilson playing a fictional version of himself, and the Meldrew character's catchphrase is repeated several times during one episode.
