= Susan Belbin =

Scottish television director and producer

Susan Jane Belbin (born 20 October 1948) is a Scottish retired television director and producer whose work includes Bread, Are You Being Served?, Hi-de-Hi!, One Foot in the Grave, 'Allo 'Allo!, It Ain't Half Hot Mum, Only Fools and Horses, Life Without George, and Jonathan Creek.

== Personal life ==
Susan Jane Belbin was born in Inverness, Scotland on 20 October 1948. She later moved to London.

== Career ==
Belbin worked with Morecambe and Wise for three years and with David Croft for seven years. Later she often worked with David Renwick and produced and directed nearly all of Renwick's first five series of One Foot in the Grave. In 1997, she retired due to ill health and left the BBC. Renwick persuaded her to return to work on the final series to provide a certain amount of continuity. However, her ill health quickly forced her to resign from the show for a second time.
