= Richard Wilson (Scottish actor) =

Scottish actor and theatre director (born 1936)

Richard Wilson OBE
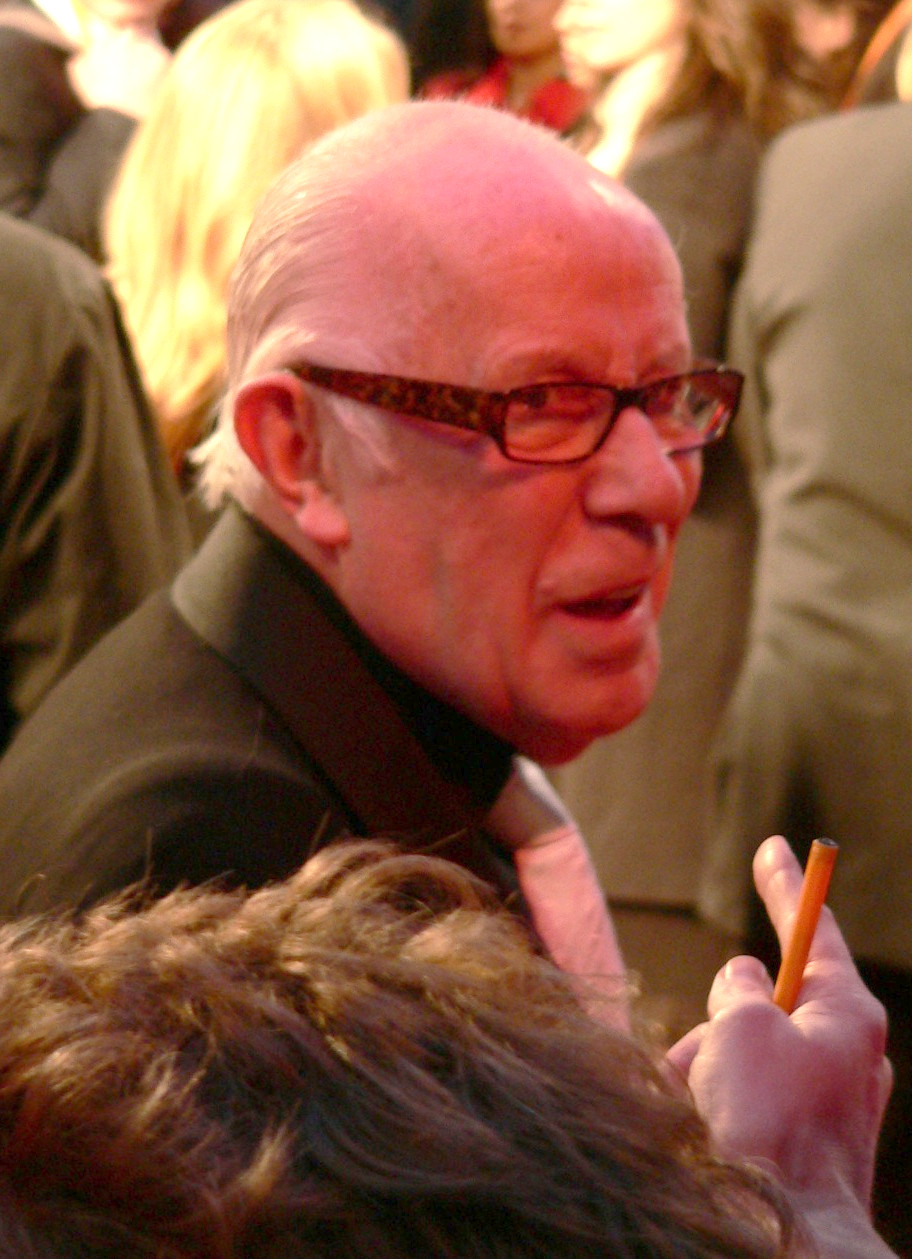
- Wilson at the 2007 British Academy Television Awards
- Born: Iain Carmichael Wilson; 9 July 1936 (age 90); Greenock, Renfrewshire, Scotland
- Occupations: Actor; theatre director; broadcaster
- Years active: 1964–present
- Notable work: See below
- Television: Only When I Laugh; One Foot in the Grave; Born and Bred; Britain's Best Drives; Merlin

Richard Wilson (born Iain Carmichael Wilson; 9 July 1936) is a Scottish actor, broadcaster, and theatre director. He is most famous for playing Victor Meldrew in the BBC sitcom One Foot in the Grave. Another notable role was as Gaius, the court physician of Camelot, in the BBC drama Merlin.

== Early life ==
Wilson was born on 9 July 1936 in Greenock in Renfrewshire, Scotland. He went to Lady Alice Primary school in Greenock. He studied science subjects at Greenock Academy, then completed his National Service with the Royal Army Medical Corps, serving in Singapore.

== Career ==
Wilson worked in a laboratory at Stobhill Hospital in Glasgow as a research assistant before switching to acting, aged 27. He trained at Royal Academy of Dramatic Art (RADA) in London, graduating in 1965 with an Acting (RADA Diploma). He then appeared in repertory theatres in Edinburgh (Traverse Theatre), Glasgow and Manchester (Stables Theatre).

Wilson initially turned down the role of Victor Meldrew and it was almost offered to Les Dawson before Wilson changed his mind. Wilson has stated that he came to hate Meldrew's catchphrase of "I don't believe it!" to the point where he now refuses to say it except for charity.

Wilson was appointed an OBE in the 1994 Birthday Honours for services to Drama. In April 1996, he was elected Rector of the University of Glasgow for a term of three years.

The narration of "The Man Who Called Himself Jesus", from Strawbs' 1969 eponymous first album, was performed by Wilson.

Wilson's biography, One Foot on the Stage: The Biography of Richard Wilson, was written by James Roose-Evans.

In March 2011, Wilson presented an edition of the Channel 4 current affairs programme Dispatches entitled Train Journeys From Hell, with transport journalist Christian Wolmar highlighting the failings of the British railway network.

== Personal life ==
Wilson has lived in London since 1959.

Wilson has been a campaigner for gay rights for many years. He appeared at charity events organised by gay rights campaign group Stonewall, but had not discussed his own sexuality in interviews with the media. He was named in a list of influential gay people in 2013 by Time Out magazine, which he considered to have outed him.

Wilson is a supporter of his local football club, Greenock Morton, but he has come to lend greater support to English club Manchester United. He is a patron of the Manchester United Supporters Trust. Wilson is a good friend of his One Foot in the Grave co-star Angus Deayton, and is godfather to Deayton's son.

Wilson is one of the patrons of Scottish Youth Theatre. Wilson is also a long-time supporter of the charity Sense and in 2007 hosted their annual award ceremony. He is also one of the honorary patrons of the London children's charity, Scene & Heard. He has been honorary president of the Scottish Community Drama Association (SCDA) since 1998.

Wilson is a supporter of the Labour Party. He donated more than £5,000 to the party in 1997 and recorded the party's manifesto on audio for the 2010 general election.

On 12 August 2016, it was reported that Wilson had suffered a heart attack. He had been due to reprise the role of Victor Meldrew in a one-man show at the 2016 Edinburgh Festival Fringe.

In June 2021, Wilson was the guest on BBC Radio 4's Desert Island Discs. His choices included "Hammond Song" by The Roches, Symphony No. 6 in D minor by Sibelius and "The First Time Ever I Saw Your Face" performed by Roberta Flack. His book choice was the poetry of Robert Burns and his luxury item was a subscription to The Guardian.

Wilson had one elder sister, Moira, who died in 2021 at the age of 91.

== Filmography ==
=== Films ===
- Junket 89 (1970) as Mr Potter
- The Trouble with 2B (1972) as Mr Potter
- Mark Gertler: Fragments of a Biography (1981) as Clive Bell
- Those Glory Glory Days (1983, TV Movie) as Arnold – Journalist
- A Passage to India (1984) as Turton
- Foreign Body (1986) as Col. Partridge
- Whoops Apocalypse (1986) as Nigel Lipman
- Prick Up Your Ears (1987) as Psychiatrist
- How to Get Ahead in Advertising (1989) as Bristol
- A Dry White Season (1989) as Cloete
- Soft Top Hard Shoulder (1992) as Uncle Salvatore
- Carry On Columbus (1992) as Don Juan Felipe
- The Man Who Knew Too Little (1997) as Sir Roger Daggenhurst
- Women Talking Dirty (1999) as Ronald
- The Comedy Trail: A Shaggy Dog Story (1999) as Victor Meldrew
- Love and Other Disasters (2006) as Registrar
- Gnomeo & Juliet (2011) as Mr. Capulet (voice)
- Sherlock Gnomes (2018) as Mr. Capulet (voice)

=== Television ===
- The Adventures of Robin Hood (1956) (Uncredited)
- Dr. Finlay's Casebook (1965) – as Mason
- Crown Court (1970s) – as Jeremy Parsons QC (1972–1984)
- My Good Woman (1972–1974) – as Rev. Martin Hooper (in 3 episodes)
- Soldier and me (1974) – as Dr Nixon
- A Sharp Intake of Breath 1977 to 1980
- Yanks Go Home (1977) – as Rev. Desmond Brierley (in 2 episodes)
- The Sweeney episode "The Bigger They Are" as DCI Anderson (1978)
- Some Mothers Do 'Ave 'Em episode "Wendy House" as Mr Harris The Insurance Man (1978)
- Only When I Laugh (1979–1982) as Gordon Thorpe
- In Loving Memory as Percy Openshaw (in two episodes)
- Andy Robson (1982–1983) – as Mr Ridley (in 3 episodes)
- The Adventures of Sherlock Holmes episode The Red Headed League as Duncan Ross (1985)
- Have I Got News for You
- Screen Two: Poppyland (1985) as Theodore Watts-Dunton
- Howards' Way (1986 one episode) as Viscount Cunningham
- Emmerdale (1986)
- Room at the Bottom (1986–1988) as Toby Duckworth
- High & Dry as Richard Talbot
- Tutti Frutti (1987)
- Hot Metal (1988)
- The Play on One: Normal Service (1988) as Max
- Screen Two: Fellow Traveller (1989) Sir Hugo
- One Foot in the Grave (1990–2000) as Victor Meldrew
- Cluedo (1991) as Reverend Jonathan Green
- Selling Hitler (1991)
- Mr. Bean – episode The Trouble with Mr. Bean as Mr A. M. Peggit The Dentist (1992)
- Inspector Morse – episode "Absolute Conviction (1992)"
- The World of Peter Rabbit and Friends as Mr. McGregor (1992)
- Under the Hammer (1994) (as Ben Glazier)
- Gulliver's Travels (1996)
- Lord of Misrule (1996) (as Bill Webster). Filmed at Fowey in Cornwall
- Duck Patrol (1998)
- Father Ted – episode "The Mainland" as himself (1998)
- The Mrs Merton Show (1998) guest appearance alongside Bernard Manning
- Other Animals (1999) (as Alex Cameron)
- High Stakes (2001)
- Life As We Know It (2001)
- Jeffrey Archer: The Truth as Duke of Edinburgh (2002)
- King of Fridges (2004) (as Frank)
- Doctor Who – episodes "The Empty Child" and "The Doctor Dances" (2005) – Doctor Constantine
- Born and Bred (2005)
- The F Word – Appeared as himself in the middle of the first series. (2005)
- A Harlot's Progress (2006)
- Would I Lie to You? (2007)
- Thank God You're Here (2008)
- Merlin – (all 65 episodes + 2 Children in Need specials) as Gaius (2008–2012)
- Demons – as Father Simeon (2009)
- Britain's Best Drives (2009)
- New Tricks (2009) – as Father Bernárd in episode "The War Against Drugs"
- Confessions from the Underground – Narrated (2012)
- All Aboard East Coast Trains – Narrated (2013)
- Richard Wilson on the Road (2015)
- Trollied (2015)
- Coming Oot! A Fabulous History of Gay Scotland – Narrated (2015)
- Richard Wilson's Highland Fling at IMDb (2017) travel in style by rail and ship through the Scottish Highlands (documentary)
- Around the World in 80 Days (2021)
- Ant & Dec's Saturday Night Takeaway (2023)
- One Foot in the Grave – 30 Years Of Laughs (2023)

== Stage acting ==
- Twelfth Night, as Malvolio, Royal Shakespeare Company
- Whipping it Up by Steve Thompson, Bush Theatre, Ambassadors Theatre
- What the Butler Saw, as Dr Rance, Royal National Theatre
- Peter Pan, as Mr Darling/Captain Hook, Royal Festival Hall
- Waiting for Godot, as Vladimir, Traverse Theatre, Edinburgh and Royal Exchange Theatre, Manchester
- Uncle Vanya, as Vanya, Traverse Theatre
- A Little Hotel on the Side by Georges Feydeau, Theatre Royal, Bath, August 2013
- Krapp's Last Tape, as Krapp, Sheffield Crucible Theatre, 25 June – 19 July 2014
- Forty Years On by Alan Bennett, Chichester Festival Theatre, as the Headmaster, 21 April – 20 May 2017.

== Theatre direction ==
Wilson won the TMA Best Director Award in 2000 for Mr Kolpert.

- An Inspector Calls by J B Priestley – Royal Exchange Theatre, Manchester, 1986
- A Wholly Healthy Glasgow by Ian Heggie, Royal Exchange Theatre, Edinburgh International Festival, The Royal Court, 1988/89
- Women Laughing by Michael Wall, The Royal Exchange Theatre, 1992
- The Lodger by Simon Burke. World premiere at the Royal Exchange Theatre, 1994
- Primo 2004
- The Woman Before by Roland Schimmelpfennig, Royal Court, May 2005
- East Coast Chicken Supper by Martin J Taylor, The Traverse, 2005
- Rainbow Kiss by Simon Farquhar, Royal Court, April 2006
- Smack Family Robinson by Richard Bean – Kingston upon Thames, March and April 2013
- Blasted by Sarah Kane, Sheffield Studio, 2015
- Peggy For You by Alan Plater, Hampstead Theatre, 2021

== Radio ==
- The Corrupted (BBC Radio 4, 2017) as Melford Stevenson
- Radio Diaries (BBC Radio 4, 2021) as Archie, a former tango dance partner/teacher on cruise liners, now in a care home, looking back over his life relationship with the tango. Written by Ron Hutchinson.
- Believe It! (BBC Radio 4, 2012–22) as himself in a spoof comic autobiography written by Jon Canter
- King Lear (BBC Radio 4, 2025) as King Lear

== Exercise videos ==
- Let's Dance (1996)

Academic offices
Preceded by Johnny Ball	Rector of the University of Glasgow; 1996–1999	Succeeded by Ross Kemp
