= Parson's Brook =

River in West Sussex, England

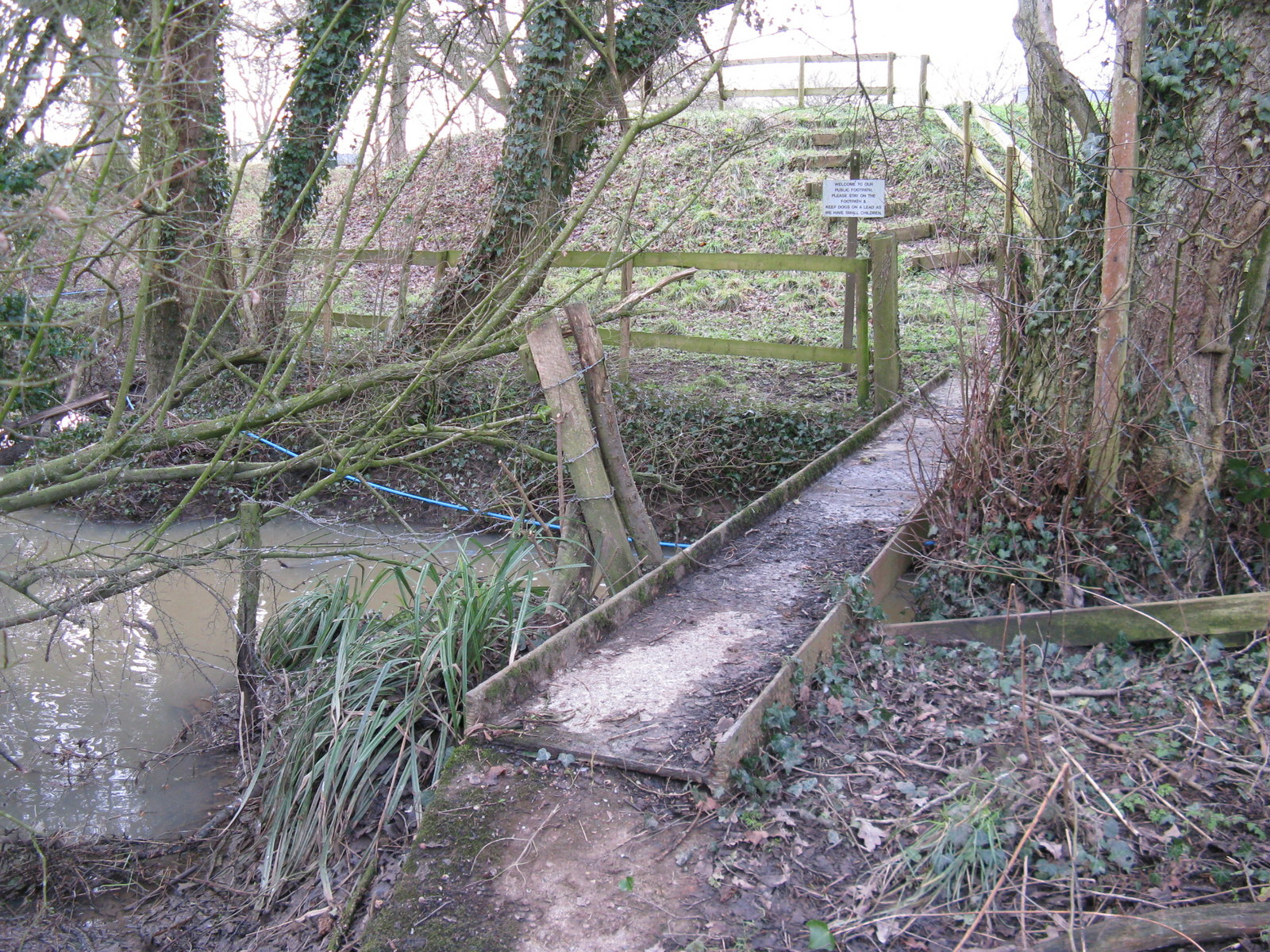

Location
- Country: United Kingdom
- County: West Sussex
- District: Horsham District

Physical characteristics
- Source
  - location: Barns Green, Itchingfield
- Mouth: River Adur
  - coordinates: 51°00′14″N 0°24′21″W

Parson's Brook is a minor river (brook) located in the Horsham District of West Sussex, England. It is a tributary to the River Adur.

== Course ==
The brook rises in the hamlet of Barns Green, in the civil parish of Itchingfield, and flows south-west, passing multiple farmsteads, before flowing north-west around Brooks Green in the civil parish of Shipley, after which the brook flows into the River Adur.
