= List of Jonathan Creek episodes =

Five series and six specials of the British mystery crime drama series Jonathan Creek have been broadcast since its debut in 1997. Produced by the BBC and written by David Renwick, it stars Alan Davies as the title character who works as a creative consultant to a stage magician while also solving seemingly supernatural mysteries through his talent for logical deduction and his understanding of illusions.

== Series overview ==
Series
Series	Episodes	Originally released	
Series	Episodes	First released	Last released
1	5	10 May 1997	7 June 1997
2	6	24 January 1998	28 February 1998
Special (1998)		24 December 1998	
3	6	27 November 1999	2 January 2000
Special (2001)		26 December 2001	
4	6	1 March 2003	28 February 2004
Specials (2009–2013)		1 January 2009	1 April 2013
5	3	28 February 2014	14 March 2014
Special (2016)		28 December 2016	

== Episodes ==
=== Series 1 (1997) ===
No. overall	No. in series	Title	Directed by	Running time	Original release date	UK viewers (millions)
1	1	"The Wrestler's Tomb"	Marcus Mortimer	90 minutes	10 May 1997	9.31
An artist is found dead at his home, while his mistress is found bound, blindfolded and gagged with tape. A burglar is charged with murder but protests his innocence to Maddy Magellan, a writer with a reputation for clearing miscarriages of justice. The only alternative suspect is the artist's wife who was well aware of his affair with another woman, but how could she have left her city office without her personal assistant seeing her leave? After a chance meeting at one of magician Adam Klaus's shows, Maddy recruits the initially reluctant Jonathan Creek, the actual designer of Adam's tricks, to provide her with some ideas about how the wife could have reached the scene of the crime, but Creek soon uncovers an even more sinister side to the case. First appearance of Caroline Quentin as Maddy Magellan. Guest stars: Sheila Gish, Saskia Mulder, Anthony Head (his only appearance as Adam Klaus), Colin Baker, Alistair McGowan, Jane Hazlegrove.
2	2	"Jack in the Box"	Marcus Mortimer	60 minutes	17 May 1997	9.35
After Maddy successfully campaigns to free a man she believes to have been wrongly imprisoned for murder, the elderly husband of the victim, a retired comedian, is found shot dead in his nuclear fall-out shelter. The otherwise empty bunker is locked from the inside, which would suggest that the man shot himself, but he has crippling arthritis in his hands and could barely pour a drink, much less pull a trigger, so how did he actually die? Guest stars: John Bluthal, Bernard Kay, Maureen O'Brien, Robin Soans, Andrew Powell and Geoffrey Beevers
3	3	"The Reconstituted Corpse"	Marcus Mortimer	60 minutes	24 May 1997	8.28
Zola Zbzewski has made her money and reputation by being one of the most cosmetically altered women in Britain. However, when she publishes her autobiography, her cosmetic surgeon and ex-lover is outraged by what she says about him and threatens to sue her. He is later shot dead at his home. Zola is the first suspect and an earring with her DNA is discovered at the crime scene. But when Maddy investigates, she discovers Zola's watertight alibi – camcorder footage made by a stalker proves that she was at home when the crime took place. Later, a new wardrobe is delivered to Maddy's flat. After seeing that it is empty she gets it up to her flat only to find Zola's dead body inside it. Guest stars: Nigel Planer as Shelford, Philip McGough as Sam Brickman, Michael Mellinger as Mr. Schmitz, Kika Mirylees as Zola.
4	4	"No Trace of Tracy"	Sandy Johnson	60 minutes	31 May 1997	7.62
Tracy, a teenager who loves seventies rock music, is invited to visit her idol, retired rock star Roy Pilgrim (Jonathan is also a fan). A group of boys see her entering his house but she then vanishes. When questioned, Roy claims he never actually saw Tracy coming inside, adding that someone knocked him out and handcuffed him to a radiator at the time. Jonathan sets out to find Tracy and discover whether Roy is telling the truth or not, but what connection does Tracy's disappearance have with the Creed of Eden, an Earth-loving cult that Roy is a member of? Guest stars: Ralph Brown as Roy Pilgrim, Rob Jarvis as Tex, Heather-Jay Jones as Tracy and Del Henney as Inspector Gibbins.
5	5	"The House of Monkeys"	Sandy Johnson	60 minutes	7 June 1997	7.57
A cancer doctor is found impaled by a sword in his locked study. Mere seconds before his death, he has been heard screaming and hurling books in a panic. His wife, an old family friend of Jonathan's, asks him and Maddy to help find the killer. Suspects include the rather odd son, the air-headed daughter-in-law and assorted monkeys used for research, but what role does an envelope containing a copy of his book play in the investigation? Guest stars: Annette Crosbie and Simon Day.

=== Series 2 (1998) ===
No. overall	No. in series	Title	Directed by	Running time	Original release date	UK viewers (millions)
6	1	"Danse Macabre"	Sandy Johnson	50 minutes	24 January 1998	9.68
A writer is shot dead on Halloween by a man in a skeleton costume who subsequently takes her unconscious daughter hostage and locks himself in the garage. The police surround the garage but when they open the door, the killer has vanished, leaving only the daughter who has no memory of the incident. With Jonathan otherwise occupied due to Adam currently being blackmailed by a barmaid he spent the night with, Maddy must tackle the case with only limited access to Jonathan's expertise. First appearance of Stuart Milligan as Adam Klaus. Guest stars: Peter Davison, Pippa Haywood and Jimmi Harkishin.
7	2	"Time Waits for Norman"	Sandy Johnson	50 minutes	31 January 1998	9.15
Antonia, a friend of Maddy's, asks her and Jonathan to discover what her husband, Norman, has been up to after reliable independent witnesses place him on both sides of the Atlantic only minutes apart. However, Jonathan is busy dealing with his tax return with a beautiful tax inspector. Guest stars: Dermot Crowley as Norman, Deborah Grant as Antonia, Zoë Hart as Rebecca Knape and Lorelei King as Justine Bailey. Rob Jarvis makes his second cameo, this time as Wino.
8	3	"The Scented Room"	Sandy Johnson	50 minutes	7 February 1998	10.49
A painting disappears from a locked room and the owner, theatre critic Sylvester Le Fley, offers a large reward for its recovery, which tempts Maddy. Jonathan is quick to announce that he knows how the theft was done, but will not explain due to his dislike of Le Fley, who recently published a negative review of Adam's show. Desperate measures are required to get him to help, but the only clue he will reveal is that a spam sandwich is involved. Guest stars: Bob Monkhouse as Le Fley, Sophie Langham as Melissa, Christine Kavanagh as Lady Theresa Cutler and Peter Copley as Eric.
9	4	"The Problem at Gallows Gate (Part 1)"	Keith Washington	50 minutes	14 February 1998	8.99
A wealthy young eccentric commits suicide by jumping off a balcony after discovering his girlfriend in bed with someone else, but three weeks later, Adam Klaus's older sister, Kitty, witnesses the young man strangling his ex-girlfriend in her house. Guest stars: Amanda Holden, Annabel Mullion, Alistair Petrie, Georgie Glen, Clarke Peters, Jennifer Piercey, Jessica Lloyd and Stanley Townsend.
10	5	"The Problem at Gallows Gate (Part 2)"	Keith Washington	50 minutes	21 February 1998	8.94
Jonathan and Maddy begin to realise that the man Kitty saw may not have even died in the first place. Jonathan is also convinced that the removal of the dead woman's stockings plays a more important role than they initially suspected. Guest stars: Amanda Holden, Annabel Mullion, Alistair Petrie, Georgie Glen, Clarke Peters, Jennifer Piercey, Jessica Lloyd and Stanley Townsend.
11	6	"Mother Redcap"	Keith Washington	50 minutes	28 February 1998	10.92
A judge on a police protection programme is killed by a rapier blade into the chest and after a brief struggle, but only his sleeping wife was in the room at the time, and the only evidence at the crime scene is a torn fingernail. As Jonathan investigates the murder, Maddy and a new friend are investigating the derelict Mother Redcap Inn, where seven people apparently died of fright after looking out the window in the same room. A connection between the cases is drawn when Maddy discovers the body of a vagrant woman... missing a fingernail. Guest stars: Brian Murphy, Nicola Walker, Marcus Gilbert, David McKail and Hilary Sesta.

=== Christmas Special (1998) ===
No. overall	Title	Directed by	Running time	Original release date	UK viewers (millions)
12	"Black Canary"	Sandy Johnson	90 minutes	24 December 1998	9.86
An illusionist, whose twin sister died when an escape trick went wrong and she was partially sliced in half, is found dead in her snow-covered garden after her husband witnessed her shooting herself. However, the postmortem reveals that she had already been dead for several hours before the shooting, and there are no other footprints around the body despite the husband seeing someone talking to her and fleeing before she pulled the trigger. Jonathan and Maddy are prompted to investigate by the dead woman's daughter – an old flame of Jonathan's – along with the debonair Detective Inspector Gideon Pryke, the police officer officially in charge of the case. Back at the theatre, Adam has fallen in love with a 29-year-old Austrian woman, but she may have more layers than even he knows. Guest stars: Rik Mayall, Hannah Gordon, Francis Matthews, Suzanna Hamilton, Sanjeev Bhaskar, Murray Melvin, Kate Isitt and Vincent Wong.

=== Series 3 (1999–2000) ===
No. overall	No. in series	Title	Directed by	Running time	Original release date	UK viewers (millions)
13	1	"The Curious Tale of Mr Spearfish"	Keith Washington	50 minutes	27 November 1999	11.02
A man who claims to have sold his soul to the Devil has a remarkable run of good luck – ranging from finding ancient treasure in his backyard to surviving a point-blank range shooting – but Jonathan and Maddy believe his success may be coming from a more Earthly source than hell. Adam, meanwhile, has to deal with a rather awkward court case where a woman claims he asked her to perform unnatural acts with a kipper. Guest stars: Griff Rhys Jones, Maxine Peake, Debbie Arnold, Andrew Tiernan, Peter Hughes, Adjoa Andoh and Brett Fancy.
14	2	"The Eyes of Tiresias"	Keith Washington	50 minutes	4 December 1999	9.86
When an old woman experiences dreams of the future, including the murder of a Swiss businessman and a car crash, Jonathan must find out what is happening before her dreams of being attacked by a one-eyed man with a sword come to pass. Guest stars: Rebecca Front, Paul Blackthorne, Peter Blake, Margery Mason, Terrence Hardiman, Diana Weston, James Gaddas and Damien Goodwin.
15	3	"The Omega Man"	Keith Washington	50 minutes	11 December 1999	10.7
Maddy is contacted by a man who makes a living investigating the existence of aliens and who presents a real alien skeleton he said he found. The US Air Force intervenes and takes the skeleton, but it vanishes on the way to the military base, leaving Jonathan to try to find out where it went. Guest stars: John Shrapnel, Michael Brandon and Charlie Brooks (billed as Charlene Brooks).
16	4	"Ghosts Forge"	Richard Holthouse	50 minutes	18 December 1999	10.47
An old friend of Maddy's wants her and Jonathan to investigate a house supposedly called Ghost's Forge (though Jonathan Creek notices the house name on the gate-post reads Ghosts Forge), as she is having an affair with a man who keeps muttering about it in his sleep. Investigations reveal that the last owner of the house was found dead several years ago and the place is now being rebuilt into flats. As Jonathan looks into the man's real identity, his only clue being a package in the attic containing six books by a best-selling author, Maddy takes the opportunity to perform a disappearing trick of her own. Guest stars: Lysette Anthony, Jim Bowen, Gina Bellman, Mark Aiken and Nicholas Amer.
17	5	"Miracle in Crooked Lane"	Richard Holthouse	50 minutes	28 December 1999	11.45
A former glamour model, now living quietly with her rich, older husband in the countryside, is seriously injured when her garden shed explodes, leaving her badly burned. However, a reliable, independent witness insists she spoke to the unharmed woman several hours later as she went to church. Jonathan investigates with the help (and hindrance) of his rapidly growing fan club, all of whom dress exactly like him; two of them even live in windmills. Guest stars: Dinah Sheridan, Nicholas Ball, Emma Kennedy, Hetty Baynes, Benjamin Whitrow, Tom Goodman-Hill and William Vanderpuye.
18	6	"The Three Gamblers"	Keith Washington	50 minutes	2 January 2000	10.65
A drug dealer and criminal who was shot six times in the head somehow managed to climb up the stairs from the cellar in the intervening time between his body being dumped and it being discovered months later. Jonathan and Maddy try to investigate, but things are hampered by the killer's belief that his victim has supernatural powers and will kill him from beyond the grave. Final appearance of Caroline Quentin as Maddy Magellan. Guest stars: John Bird, Hattie Hayridge, Jonathan Ross, Nina Sosanya, John Bennett, Cavan Clerkin and Lee Ingleby.

=== Christmas Special (2001) ===
No. overall	Title	Directed by	Running time	Original release date	UK viewers (millions)
19	"Satan's Chimney"	Sandy Johnson	120 minutes	26 December 2001	7.64
With Maddy gone to America on a book promotion tour, Jonathan teams up with Carla Borrego, a theatrical agent representing an escapologist who is being hired for Adam's show. They investigate how a well-known actress could have been shot through a window during the filming of her latest movie without the glass having been broken. The inquiry also turns up an old secret used to kill blasphemers in a castle owned by the film's producer. First appearance of Julia Sawalha as Carla Borrego. Guest stars: Bill Bailey, Mary Tamm, Lorraine Hilton, Steven Berkoff, Lisa Stokke, Matt Rippy, Bill Ward, Penny Smith, Sonya Saul, Jay Benedict and James Saxon.

=== Series 4 (2003–2004) ===
No. overall	No. in series	Title	Directed by	Running time	Original release date	UK viewers (millions)
20	1	"The Coonskin Cap"	Christine Gernon	60 minutes	1 March 2003	9.48
After an awkward break-up some months ago, Jonathan and Carla – now married to the producer of a Crimewatch-like television show – unite to investigate a serial killer who wears a Davy Crockett hat and kills people named after flowers. However, things take on a new dynamic when the killer shoots at police during a reconstruction of a murder and escapes from a locked room while the only window was in full view of those present. Later, a policewoman is strangled in a school gym from which the killer again had no means of escape. First appearance of Adrian Edmondson as Carla's producer husband Brendan Baxter.
21	2	"Angel Hair"	Christine Gernon	60 minutes	8 March 2003	9.9
A pop star's husband is baffled as to how a woman he had an affair with can regrow a full head of hair barely two days after she had it all hacked off in a hoax kidnap ransom video. Meanwhile, Carla is jealous of Jonathan's relationship with a make-up consultant on the show, believing that the woman is in a rebound relationship after the death of her dog. Guest stars: Jack Dee, Sophie Thompson and Tamsin Greig. Writer of the show, David Renwick makes a brief, uncredited appearance.
22	3	"The Tailor's Dummy"	Christine Gernon	60 minutes	15 March 2003	9.5
A designer commits suicide by jumping out a window after reading a bad review of his work, but that leaves the question of why he chose to throw his caged, treasured parrot out the window as well. Subsequent events, with a man changing his physical appearance in a matter of seconds while threatening the journalist who wrote the review, also prompt several questions. To answer these, Jonathan must work out what the life of Franklin D. Roosevelt, a Marx Brothers video and a drawer full of socks have to do with the solution to the mystery. Guest stars: Maureen Lipman, Nicholas Jones, Bill Bailey, Victoria Shalet.
23	4	"The Seer of the Sands"	Sandy Johnson	60 minutes	14 February 2004	8.39
A man who investigates 'supernatural' occurrences kills himself by crashing his boat after receiving a fax from his lover. However, the fact that the fax was good news (his lover's husband was agreeing to a divorce), that his body has disappeared from the scene of the accident and that some gypsies are claiming to be in contact with his spirit with a message for his visiting lover all provide questions that Jonathan must answer. Guest star: Lorelei King
24	5	"The Chequered Box"	Sandy Johnson	60 minutes	21 February 2004	8.45
A police detective is photographed after apparently murdering a prosecutor by hanging her in her office. The detective has something of a fascination with death. What is in the strange chequered box he forces onto his daughter and who is the mysterious "Mr G" with whom they have a deal? Jonathan, for his part, is more concerned as to how a piece of chewing gum got moved from one potted plant to another at the crime scene.
25	6	"Gorgons Wood"	Sandy Johnson	60 minutes	28 February 2004	8.07
A priceless Eastern porcelain monk (said to have a curse on it that will bring nothing but evil to its owners) is stolen in front of several witnesses, prompting Jonathan and Carla's discovery of a major case of sibling rivalry, a disfigured woman who resembles another person, and a twisted love affair. Final appearance of Julia Sawalha as Carla Borrego. Guest stars: Celia Imrie and Michael Cochrane.

=== Specials (2009–2013) ===
No. overall	No. in series	Title	Directed by	Running time	Original release date	UK viewers (millions)
26	1	"The Grinning Man"	David Renwick	120 minutes	1 January 2009	9.91
Since 1938, a number of people have disappeared from the attic of a Gothic mansion, owned originally by a spiritualist and now by his stage magician descendant. Seventy years later, when a young woman disappears in the same room, her friend Joey Ross, herself a paranormal investigator, calls on Jonathan for help. As the mystery deepens with the kidnapping of the magician's partner, Creek's powers of deduction seem to pale beside the raw intuition of his "collaborator". Meanwhile Adam takes an interest in the porn business, both financially and personally. First appearance of Sheridan Smith as Joey Ross. Guest stars: Katherine Parkinson, Judy Parfitt. First directing role of David Renwick.
27	2	"The Judas Tree"	David Renwick	94 minutes	4 April 2010	6.62
Jonathan Creek is called upon by his friend, investigator Joey Ross, to look into a series of mysterious and spooky events at a house called Green Lanterns. They concern a young girl called Emily – new housekeeper to the famous mystery writer Hugo Doré and his wife, Harriet. But Emily's new role comes with a house that has its own fair share of history and mystery... When Harriet is seen falling from a window, Emily is arrested on suspicion of murder, though she swears she is innocent. Using his powers of deduction and belief that nothing is as it seems, Creek races against time to uncover a number of intriguing clues which lead him to the unbelievable truth and the revealing of one of the greatest acts of illusion he has encountered yet. Final appearance of Stuart Milligan as Adam Klaus. Guest stars: Paul McGann, Doreen Mantle, Ian McNeice and Natalie Walter.
28	3	"The Clue of the Savant's Thumb"	David Renwick	90 minutes	1 April 2013	8.75
Jonathan Creek has left magic and theatre behind and is now a high-powered businessman with a wife, Polly. His old fellow investigator, Joey Ross, draws him into a complex case involving a secret society, seemingly supernatural events at a girls’ boarding school, and the miraculous disappearance of a body in front of three witnesses made all the more baffling with photographic evidence that the body was definitely there. Will Jonathan crack the case? Guest stars: Rik Mayall as DI Gideon Pryke, Joanna Lumley as Rosalind Tartikoff and Nigel Planer. Writer and director of the show David Renwick makes a brief, uncredited appearance. Final appearance of Sheridan Smith as Joey Ross. First appearance of Sarah Alexander as Polly Creek. Final directing role of David Renwick.

=== Series 5 (2014) ===
No. overall	No. in series	Title	Directed by	Running time	Original release date	UK viewers (millions)
29	1	"The Letters of Septimus Noone"	David Sant	60 minutes	28 February 2014	8.09
When a classic locked room mystery is turned into a West End musical, its female star falls victim to a real-life 'impossible crime', which Jonathan reluctantly becomes involved in solving. Meanwhile Polly uncovers a cache of love letters between her late mother and a mysterious admirer, Septimus Noone. Guest stars: Raquel Cassidy, Simon Thomas, Ali Bastian, Marianne Borgo, Ross Armstrong, Roy Sampson, Alice O'Connell and Paula Wilcox. Producer: Rosemary McGowan. Executive Producer: Pete Thornton
30	2	"The Sinner and the Sandman"	David Sant	60 minutes	7 March 2014	7.18
Jonathan must discover how a retired stage psychic apparently predicted a set of winning lottery numbers decades before the draw was made. He also has to deal with reports of a mysterious creature prowling the village and discover how the village parish newsletter contains uncanny details about people's lives. Guest stars: Tim Faraday, John Bird, David Gant, Selina Griffiths, John Walters, Chloe Buswell and Michael Troughton. Producer: Rosemary McGowan. Executive Producer: Pete Thornton
31	3	"The Curse of the Bronze Lamp"	David Sant	60 minutes	14 March 2014	6.82
Polly and Jonathan become embroiled in their housekeeper's affairs after she finds a dead man in her house. Events take a twist when a wristwatch found at the scene belongs to a woman who has been kidnapped and held for ransom. Guest stars: June Whitfield, Josie Lawrence, John Bird, Melanie Gray, Dar Dash and Daniel Osgerby Producer: Rosemary McGowan. Executive Producer: Pete Thornton

=== Christmas Special (2016) ===
No. overall	Title	Directed by	Running time	Original release date	UK viewers (millions)
32	"Daemons' Roost"	Sandy Johnson	89 minutes	28 December 2016	7.28
The stepdaughter of horror film director Nathan Clore contacts Jonathan to help her find the answer to the mysterious deaths of her mother and two sisters years earlier. Her stepfather was going to reveal the secret to her, but suffered a stroke and is unable to communicate. She believes the answer lies within Daemons' Roost, her stepfather's mansion, formerly owned by notorious 19th century sorcerer Jacob Surtees. With help from the local vicar, together they uncover a tale of murderous revenge. Meanwhile Jonathan is stalked by an adversary from a previous case who also has revenge on his mind. Guest stars: Warwick Davis, Emun Elliott and Rosalind March

== Ratings ==
Jonathan Creek : UK viewers per episode (millions)

Season	Episode number						Average
Season	1	2	3	4	5	6	Average
1	9.31	9.35	8.28	7.62	7.57	–	8.43
2	9.68	9.15	10.49	8.99	8.94	10.92	9.70
3	11.02	9.86	10.70	10.47	11.45	10.65	10.69
4	9.48	9.90	9.50	8.39	8.45	8.07	8.97
5	8.09	7.18	6.82	–			7.36

Audience measurement performed by Broadcasters' Audience Research Board
