= Sasha Behar =

British actress

- Born: London, England
- Occupation: Actress
- Years active: 1994–present
- Partner: Jamie Glover
- Children: 2

Sasha Behar is an English actress, known for playing Maya Sharma in the soap opera Coronation Street.

== Career ==
Behar has two British Soap Award nominations, one for Best Exit and one for Best Storyline. From 2003 to 2004 she played the villain Maya Sharma in the ITV soap opera Coronation Street. The role won her the Best Villain award at the 2005 British Soap Awards.

Her other television credits include Holby City, Hercule Poirot's Christmas, Messiah and Lewis. She also guest starred in the Doctor Who episode "The Fires of Pompeii", playing Spurrina and played Dr Mortimer in Sherlock (2012). Her theatre credits include The Bitter Tears of Petra von Kant and The Island Princess, Eastward Hoe and The Malcontent, with the Royal Shakespeare Company.

== Personal life ==
Behar was born in London to an English mother and a Pakistani father. She is the eldest of three children, having two younger brothers. Behar did her stage training at The Poor School, in King's Cross, London.

Behar has two daughters with her partner, actor Jamie Glover. They currently live in Brixton, south London.

== Filmography ==
Year	Title	Role	Notes
1994	Hercule Poirot's Christmas	Pilar Estravados / Conchita Lopez	Television film
1997	Bugs	Yasmine: The Revenge Effect (1997)	TV series
1997	Thief Takers	Yasmin: After the Goldrush (1997)	TV series
1999	The Bill	Doctor: Pillow Talk (1999)	Police procedural
2000	North Square	Stevie Goode	Legal drama
2002	Holby City	Nandita Gupta: Shadow of a Doubt: Part Two (2002)	Medical drama
2002	Rescue Me	Emma Peters	Romantic comedy
2003	Doctors	Maxine Longhurst: Appearances (2003)	Soap opera
2003–2004	Coronation Street	Maya Sharma	Soap opera
2005	The Government Inspector	Nan	Television film
2005	Casualty	Liz Marcart: Sweet Revenge (2005); Desperate Measures (2005); A Question of Loyalty (2005); Fat Chance (2005)	Medical drama
2007	Cake	Rita	Short film
2007	Lewis	Catherine Linn: Whom the Gods would Destroy (2007)	Police procedural
2007	Sold	Sarah Glenson: Episode 1.4 (2007)	Situation comedy
2008	Messiah: The Rapture	Salma Al Fulani	Television film
2008	Incendiary	Bomber's Wife	Feature film
2008	Doctor Who	Spurrina: The Fires of Pompeii (2008)	TV series
2010	Jonathan Creek	Harriet Dore: The Judas Tree	TV series
2010	New Tricks	Emma Woodford: It Smells of Books	TV series
2011	The Shadow Line	Laing	TV series
2011	Injustice	Natalie Chandra	TV series
2011	Strike Back: Project Dawn	Iman Zubedah/Mahmood	TV series
2012	Sherlock	Dr Mortimer: "The Hounds of Baskerville"	TV series
2012	Holby City	Alex Broadhurst	TV series
2013	Luther	Dani Lane: Episode 3.1	TV series
2013	Case Histories	Layla Minyawi: Jackson and the Women	TV series
2014–2015	Da Vinci's Demons	Seer	TV series
2017	Modus	Raja Cooper	TV series
2018	Unforgotten	Jamila Faruk	TV series
2019	A Friend	Mum	Short film
2019	A Working Mom's Nightmare	Detective	Television film
2021–present	Fireman Sam	Sergeant Rose Ravani (voice)	Children's television series (UK/US version)
2020	Fireman Sam: Norman Price and the Mystery in the Sky	Sergeant Rose Ravani (voice)	UK/US version Television movie
2021	Foundation	Mari	Apple TV series
2025	Bergerac	Uma Dalal	UKTV series (5 episodes)
