= Brooks Green =

Village in West Sussex, England

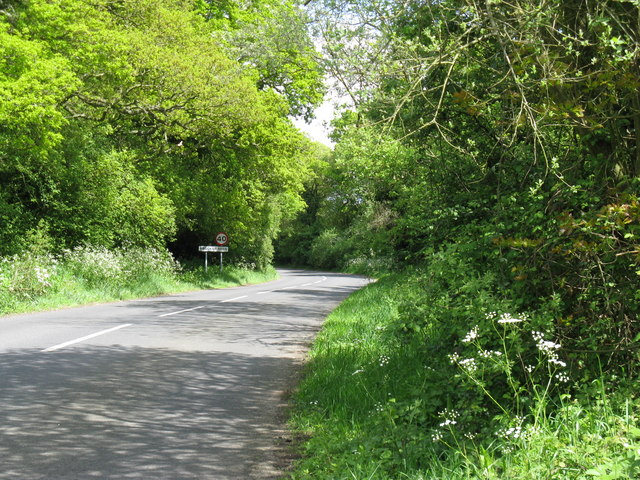
- Brooks Green road sign

- Location within West Sussex
- OS grid reference: TQ3948025617
- District: Horsham
- Shire county: West Sussex
- Region: South East
- Country: England
- Sovereign state: United Kingdom
- Post town: Horsham
- Postcode district: RH13 0
- Police: Sussex
- Fire: West Sussex
- Ambulance: South East Coast
- UK Parliament: Arundel and South Downs

Brooks Green is a hamlet in the Shipley civil parish of the Horsham District of West Sussex, England. It is in the north-west of the parish, approximately 2 miles (3 km) from the parish village of Shipley, and 4.5 miles (7 km) south-west from the district town of Horsham. The hamlet is within the Southwater South and Shipley ward for West Sussex County Council.

Brooks Green has existed at least since 1724. In 1850, it contained about nine buildings.

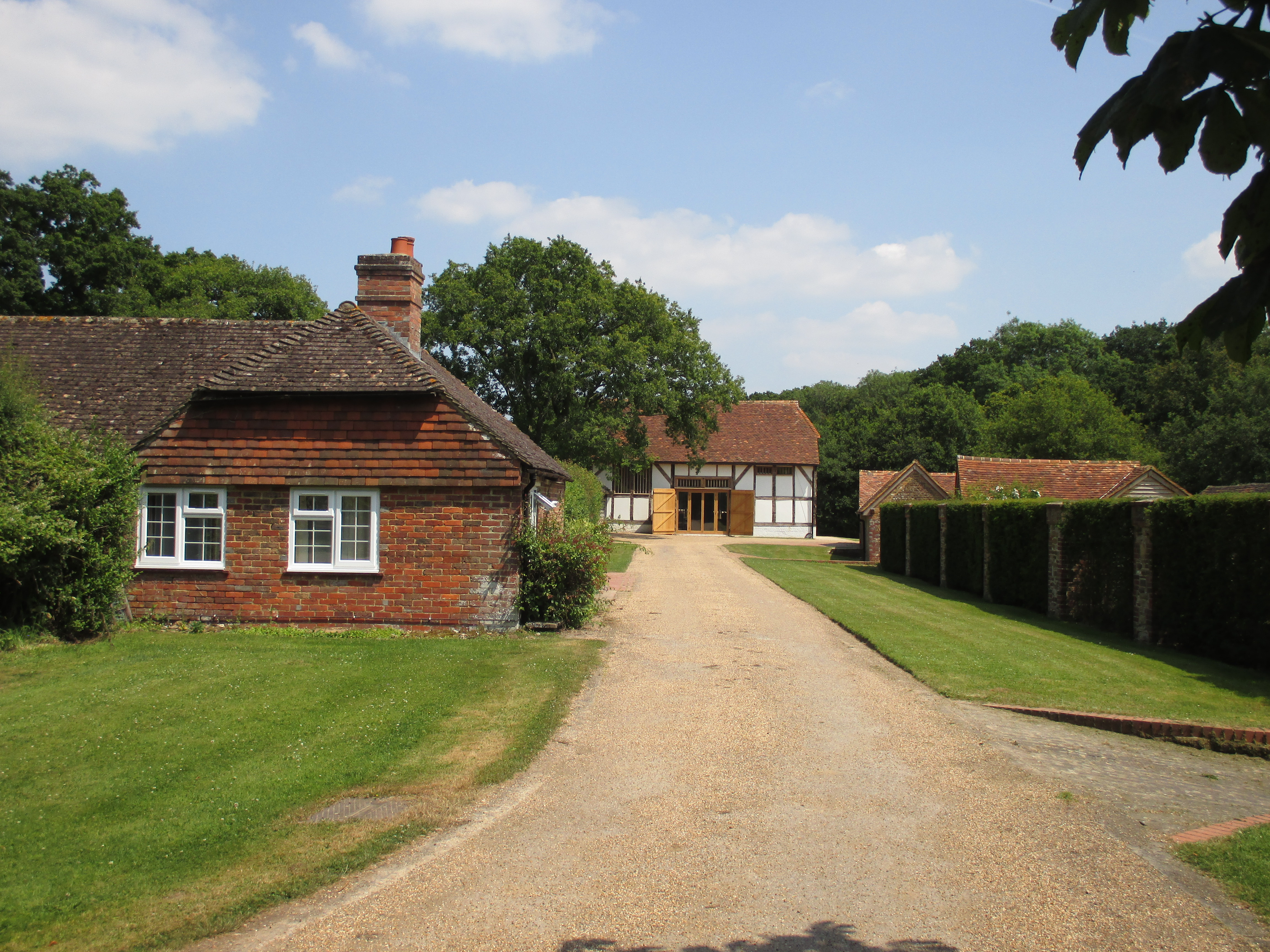
Lackenhurst (51.009961°N 0.388274°W)

The hamlet is centred on the south to north Coolham to Barns Green minor road, where Coolham Road becomes Trout Lane at a staggered junction with Emms Lane, running west, and Lackenhurst Lane, running east. The rural aspect comprises farms, fields, orchards, managed woodland and isolated and stream-fed ponds. Two streams, Lackenhurst Gill at the south-east and another at the north-west which feeds Parson's Brook, both feed the River Adur, 1,500 yards (1,400 m) to the south. In the north of the hamlet is a residential area of new-build properties, a caravan park, a motor services company, and a dog boarding kennel. Approximately 500 yards (460 m) south-east from the central junction, and south off Lackenhurst Lane, is the farmhouse of Lackenhurst, Grade II listed in 1959, which dates to the 16th century and is timber-framed, of two storeys, with a half-hipped gabled roof of Horsham Stone slabs.
