= St Mary's Church, Shipley =

Church of St Mary the Virgin
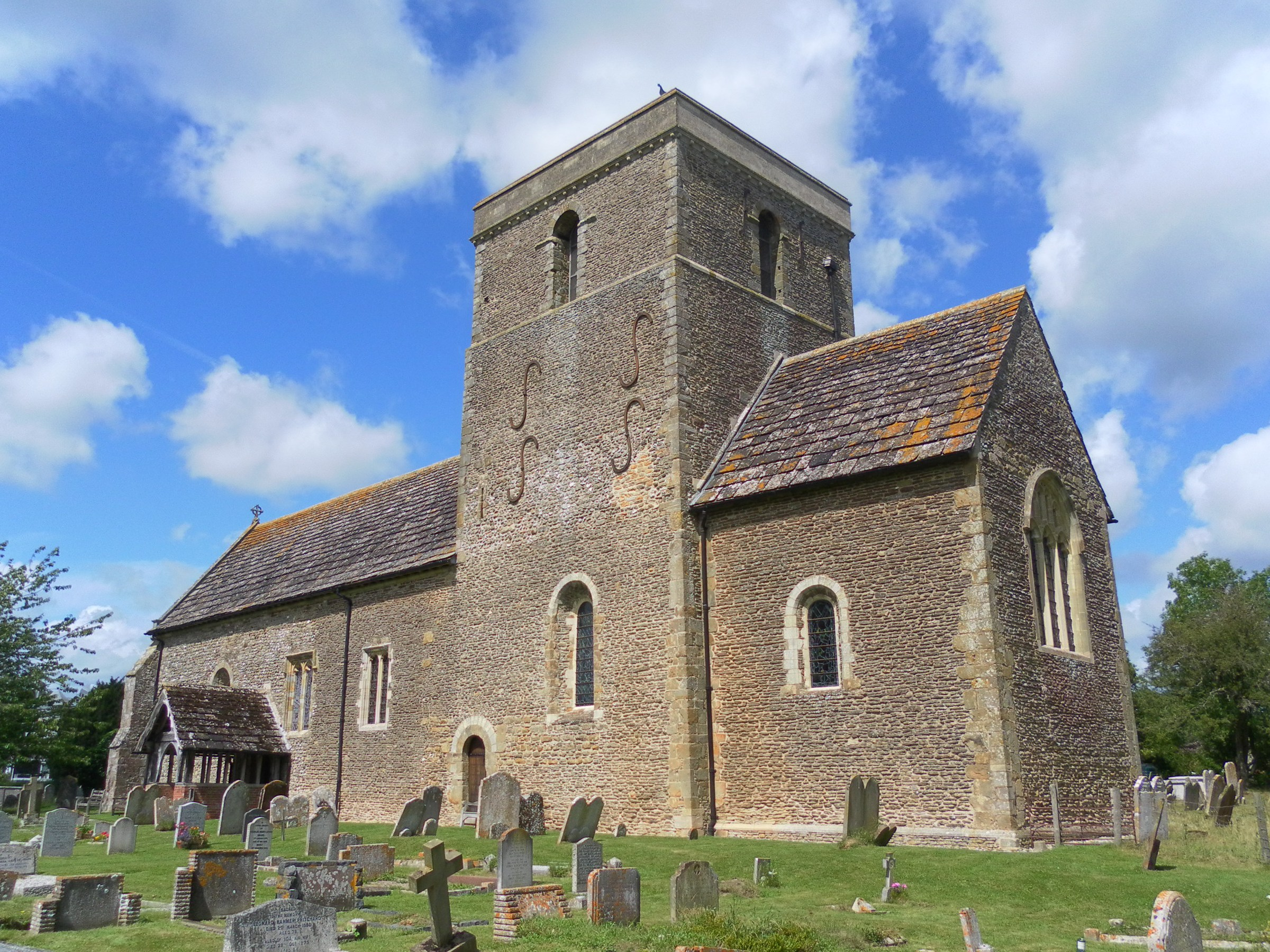
- Church of St Mary the Virgin
- 50°59′03.48″N 0°22′12.97″W
- OS grid reference: TQ 144 218
- Location: Shipley, West Sussex
- Country: England
- Denomination: Church of England

History
- Dedication: St Mary the Virgin

Architecture
- Heritage designation: Grade I
- Designated: 22 September 1959
- Completed: c. 1140

Administration
- Diocese: Chichester

The Church of St Mary the Virgin is an Anglican church in the village of Shipley, in West Sussex, England. It is in the Diocese of Chichester. Built in the mid-12th century by the Knights Templar, it is a Grade I listed building. The current vicar is the Reverend Christopher Allen.

== Early history ==
There was a church here by around 1080, but no details are known. Philip de Harcourt, Dean of Lincoln, granted the church about 1139 to the Knights Templar; it was one of their earliest endowments in England. The present building, one of the earliest Templar buildings in England, dates from about this time. The site of Shipley Preceptory, where the Knights Templar lived, is thought to have been the southern part of the churchyard.

After the suppression of the Templars it passed to the Knights Hospitaller. The dedication to Saint Mary is recorded from 1456.

== Description ==
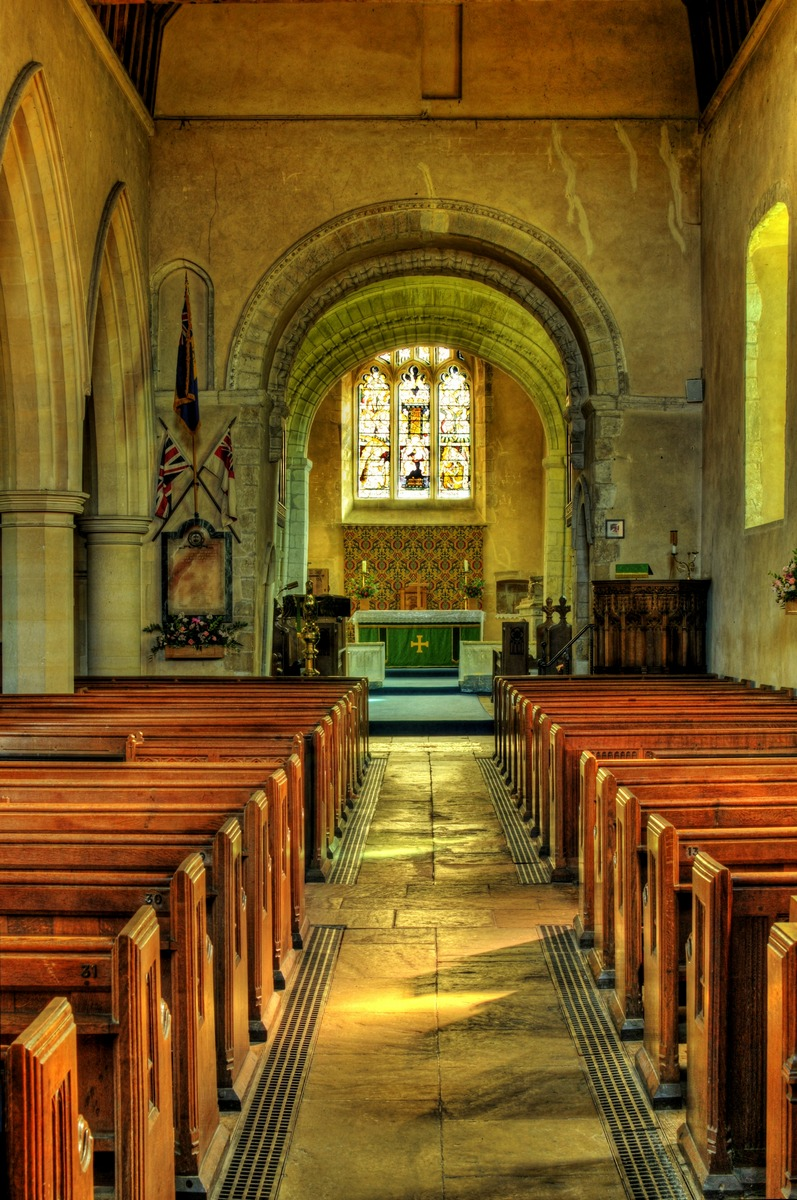
The nave, looking through the tower arches towards the chancel

The church is described in the Victoria County History: "The scale of the building reflects the prestige of the Templars, and its plainness expresses their combination of military and ascetic qualities."

It is built of local sandstone, with Caen stone for interior details. It has an axial tower, with the chancel to its east; to its west is the nave, north aisle, vestry and south porch. The tower arches are decorated.

=== 19th century ===
Sir Charles Burrell in 1831 made the plans and loaned the money for work to the church: a north aisle was built, two galleries, erected in the 17th century, were replaced by a single west gallery, and the low pyramidal spire on the tower was replaced by battlements. There was restoration in 1892–93 by John Loughborough Pearson: the west gallery was removed, the roof of the nave was replaced, and a new north aisle was built, with an arcade of alternating round and octagonal piers.

=== Monuments ===
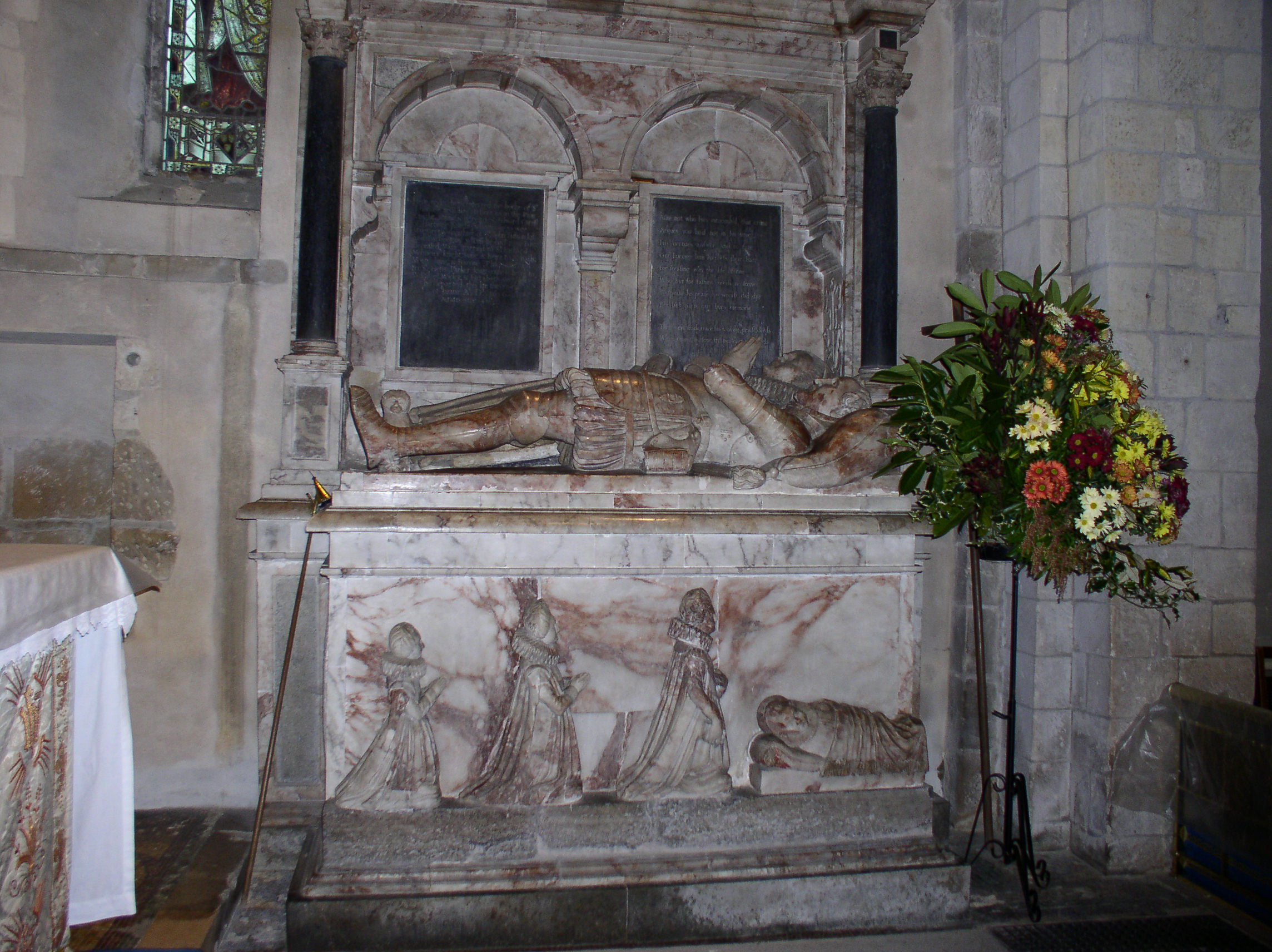
The Caryll family monument

There are monuments in the church to the Burrell family, and in the south of the chancel an alabaster monument of 1616 to Sir Thomas Caryll and his family, restored about 1831 by the sculptor John Edward Carew. The composer John Ireland is buried in the churchyard, and is commemorated by a slate tablet on the south wall of the nave. In the north aisle is a tablet in memory of the German singer Anny Ahlers, who visited Shipley.

== See also ==
- Grade I listed buildings in West Sussex
- List of places of worship in Horsham District
