= The Grinning Man (Jonathan Creek) =

- Jonathan Creek episode
- The titular Grinning Man painting
- Episode no.: Episode 26
- Directed by: David Renwick
- Written by: David Renwick
- Original air date: 1 January 2009

Guest appearances
- Naomi Bentley; Ciarán McMenamin; Jenna Harrison; Nicholas Boulton; Judy Parfitt; Jemma Walker; Katherine Parkinson

Episode chronology
← Previous "Gorgon's Wood"	Next → "The Judas Tree"

"The Grinning Man" is a feature-length and the twenty-sixth episode of the BBC crime drama series Jonathan Creek, first broadcast on 1 January 2009. The episode marked the series' return to television following a five-year hiatus and saw the return of Alan Davies as the show's titular sleuth. Stuart Milligan returned to the series as Jonathan's boss, magician Adam Klaus, while the episode also introduced Sheridan Smith as Joey Ross, Jonathan's crime-solving assistant. The episode was written and directed by series creator David Renwick, who chose to revive the show as a means of delaying his retirement.

The central mysteries of the episode focused on an attic room whose occupants disappeared without trace overnight and the kidnapped partner of a stage magician.

The episode was watched by 9.91 million viewers and attained a 36% audience share. Critical reaction to the episode from The Scotsman's Paul Whitelaw and The Northern Echo's Steve Pratt suggested that, at 120 minutes, the plot was overstretched. The Stage's Mark Wright compared Smith favourably to her predecessor in the assistant role, Julia Sawalha as Carla Borrego, while both Scotland on Sunday's Chitra Ramaswamy and Sian Brewis for the Leicester Mercury discussed the nostalgia invoked by the episode, as a result of the series having been off-air since 2004.

== Plot ==
Set five years after the previous episode, "Gorgons Wood", "The Grinning Man" begins by introducing the Gothic mansion Metropolis. Since 1938, a number of visitors staying overnight in the mansion's attic "Nightmare Room" have disappeared without a trace. Originally owned by a spiritualist, the mansion is now the property of his grandson, stage magician Lance Gessler (Nicholas Boulton). Gessler lives with his mother, Constance (Judy Parfitt), his partner Elodie (Jenna Harrison) and their groundskeeper, Glenn (Ciarán McMenamin). They offer shelter to paranormal investigator Joey Ross and her friend Mina (Naomi Bentley) when the two are caught in a storm. Mina elects to sleep in the Nightmare Room and has vanished by morning. Constance calls in sleuth Jonathan Creek to investigate Mina's disappearance.

Jonathan has recently begun a relationship with an old acquaintance, Nicola (Katherine Parkinson), who is opposed to his investigative career, believing it to be too dangerous an occupation. Jonathan is still in the employment of the magician Adam Klaus, whose television series is receiving heavy criticism from viewers. To Jonathan's bemusement, Klaus invests in the 3D pornography industry and begins dating the porn actress Candy Mountains (Jemma Walker). Jonathan inspects the attic room and the bedroom directly beneath it, but finds nothing suspicious, save for a small vent in the canopy of the room's four-poster bed, which is opened when pressure is put on the mattress, releasing dead flies.

Investigating events at Metropolis, Jonathan deduces that Gessler's grandfather was a Nazi sympathiser, who laid a trap in the attic room to kill one of his enemies without arousing suspicion, which has subsequently killed anyone else who stayed in that room. Jonathan and Joey spend the night in the room, but uncover nothing. The next morning, when trying to figure out what they had done differently to all the victims, Jonathan comes to the realisation that they would have all taken a bath in the adjoining bathroom. Upon realising the secret behind the disappearances, Jonathan races back up to the attic with Glenn. Unfortunately, Joey had already climbed into the bath, which has descended and released her into a water tank below the room, where the corpses of previous victims (including her friend Mina) remain, drowned and decomposing. The bath has not yet returned to its position so Jonathan and Glenn are able to rescue her. Confronting Constance, Jonathan explains that the room the disappearances occurred in was not the real attic room, but in fact located in a flat-roofed tower next to the real attic which had slanted ceilings built in to disguise it as the attic in order to stop people suspecting any traps beneath it. The vent in the canopy was designed to leak an ectoplasmic fluid on the first victim to ensure they would use the bath. (Note: The mystery resembles the real-life case of the Jarmans, the sixteenth-century owners of the Ostrich Inn in Slough (Berkshire), who killed wealthy travellers by tipping them into a barrel of boiling water via a hinged bed in one of the bedrooms.)

During the investigation, Gessler's partner, Elodie, is kidnapped. Joey follows Gessler from his stage show one night and observes him slashing Elodie's throat. She, Jonathan and Nicola later discover Elodie's dead body, but when they return with policemen, the corpse has been switched for a prop dummy. Glenn reveals that he and Elodie were in love and had recently married in secret. He suspects that Gessler may have murdered Elodie out of jealousy after she confessed their marriage to him. The police, however, receive a video of Elodie walking through a park the morning after she was supposedly murdered, with the day's newspaper in plain view for validation. Jonathan realizes that Gessler had manipulated Delia Gunning (Julia Ford), the editor of the local newspaper, into printing a fake copy a week in advance. By making the video before killing Elodie, he could deflect suspicion from himself, leading the police to believe that she had faked her own death and run away. Gessler ensured the front page's authenticity by having Delia create the day's headline herself, releasing a briefcase full of bees in the middle of a local council meeting. Jonathan's suspicions became aroused as the following story about the construction of a motorway through six villages would have been far more engaging as a front-pager. Jonathan and Joey arrive at Delia's home just in time to save her from being murdered by Gessler, who later kills himself by gassing himself in his car.

The "Grinning Man" of the title is the subject of a painting, reputedly by Hieronymous Bosch, which hangs in the attic Nightmare Room. Once the episode's mysteries are resolved, Constance confesses that she rescued the painting from a burning room decades previously, leaving an elderly uncle to die as she did so. She has Glenn assist her in burning the painting in Metropolis' grounds. The episode ends with Jonathan, Joey and Adam arriving at a restaurant to celebrate with their significant others. Adam discovers that he has been conned by Candy and will not be receiving any return on his pornography investment. Joey receives a call from her partner, Alec (Adam James), who reveals that he is in Miami with Nicola and the two are now seeing one another. As the maître d' (Graham Vanas) arrives to lead them to their private booth, Jonathan jests; "Three for the Nightmare Room".

== Production ==
"I had three options, I suppose. Retire, which is becoming increasingly tempting. Or go away for the best part of six months and struggle to come up with something else that interested me. And then sit and write it and decide whether I liked it and then try and interest someone else in it. Which even if the BBC had bought it, would take the best part of another year, just going through the system and then all that time delay. Or resurrect Jonathan Creek, which I’d never drawn the curtain down in quite the same way I did with One Foot In The Grave. So the boring answer is that it was a way of deferring retirement."

— David Renwick, on the decision to revive Jonathan Creek

David Renwick made the decision to revive Jonathan Creek for a Christmas special as a means of "deferring retirement". He considered the alternative of developing an entirely new series to be too lengthy a process, and regarded reviving Jonathan Creek as the "safe decision". He described the process of formulating a plot for the episode as an "agony" and a "torment", revealing that he had stopped writing the show in 2004 partly due to a lack of ideas. Renwick explained: "Inevitably, you set up a series which is all about impossibilities that then have to have a rational explanation, by definition it’s going to be pretty challenging stuff for a writer. So God knows why I ever embarked on it in the first place." As well as writing, Renwick also directed the episode, which was produced by Nerys Evans; Jonathan Creek's former producer Verity Lambert died of cancer in November 2007. Davies noted that he and Renwick met quite regularly following Lambert's death, and when Renwick suggested to the BBC that they revive Jonathan Creek, the broadcaster "bit his hand off for it". "The Grinning Man" was commissioned by Jane Tranter, Controller of BBC Fiction, with Lucy Lumsden, Controller of Comedy Commissioning, stating that the station was "delighted to have Jonathan Creek back on BBC One". Renwick was prepared for a negative reaction to the show's revival, describing how: "People say, Oh Jonathan Creek's coming back. Fantastic.' And then they watch it and go: 'God, what a mistake.' Which is what happened with One Foot in the Grave. So I tend to expect the worst."

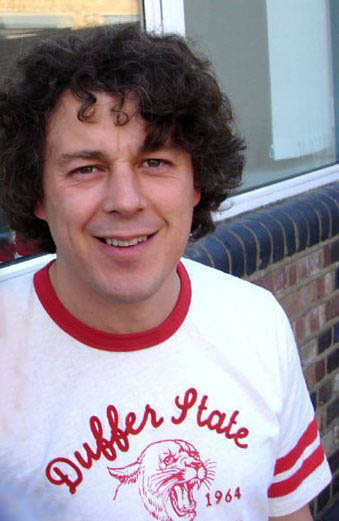
Alan Davies returned as Jonathan Creek after a five-year hiatus

Davies had suspected that Renwick would one day revive Jonathan Creek, explaining that Jonathan's fate had been left open, unlike Renwick's other famous character - One Foot In The Grave's Victor Meldrew, who was killed in a hit and run in the show's last episode. When the production of "The Grinning Man" was announced in June 2008, Davies commented: "For the last five years whenever I've passed a locked room I've thought there might be a mystery lurking behind it, so I'm very happy to return to Jonathan Creek and to have something to actually solve." He stated that reprising the role after such a lengthy hiatus was initially strange, and that: "I couldn't remember my lines on the first day. I'd sort of forgotten how precise you have to be when you work on a Jonathan Creek episode." He praised co-star Sheridan Smith in comparison, describing how: "Sheridan is extremely good at all that stuff, which works in a similar way to the script, in that she's a very bright, sharp character and Creek's a bit rusty and hasn't really been doing it for a while. So sure enough, on the first day, she knows all her lines and makes her mark. And I'm going, 'Hang on a minute, stop showing off'". Upon receiving the episode's script, Davies had gained a stone in weight since last playing Jonathan Creek, almost five years previously. Renwick suggested that they include Davies' weight gain in the plot, presenting the character as having "gone to seed". Davies, however, did not want to play a "fat Creek", and lost weight before filming began, stating: "it was my choice not to let him go too much". The actor discussed with Renwick how Jonathan may have developed in the intervening five years: "We talked about whether he’d have changed, whether he’d have done any investigating in the meantime. He probably didn’t. He still does the same job and is locked in the same relationship with Klaus and feeling a bit put upon – that hasn’t changed at all... and he still lives in a windmill". In a change from the original, Cobstone Windmill was used for the exterior shots, replacing Shipley Windmill, which had been used for all other episodes. Davies grew his hair out again for the role, and wore his own duffel coat throughout the episode. The coat had become the character's trademark in the show's first series, with Davies explaining that: "After we did the first series, I could never wear it off screen again, because people started doing the Danse Macabre [theme] music everywhere I went. So it's just been in the wardrobe for 12 years."

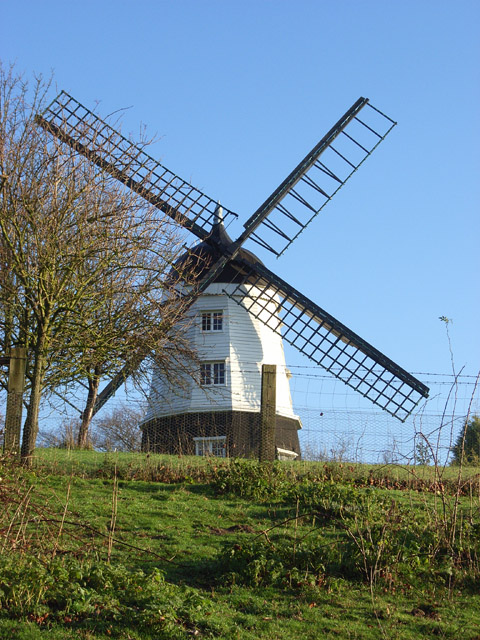
Cobstone Windmill, Ibstone, used for exterior shots of Jonathan's windmill home

Previous series of Jonathan Creek had featured first Caroline Quentin, and then Julia Sawalha as Jonathan's assistants Maddy Magellan and Carla Borrego, respectively. Quentin departed from the show at the end of its third series in 2000 in order to try for a second child, while Sawalha temporarily retired from acting in 2004, having become so disillusioned that she was "dragging [her]self out of bed" by the end of the show's fourth series in order to film episodes. Davies explained that Renwick had always believed Jonathan needed a sidekick character, and that: "You can't really have Jonathan Creek without his sounding board when all the stuff is going on in his mind. In a novel you can have an interior monologue when a leading character is working out what's going on, but for a film or television you have to have Dr Watson for Sherlock Holmes, it's somebody for Holmes to explain it to." For "The Grinning Man", a new sidekick was created in the form of Joey Ross, played by actress Sheridan Smith. Renwick described the opportunity to work with Smith as a major catalyst in his decision to revive the show. The actress had previously appeared in his series Love Soup, and Renwick's wife suggested pairing her with Davies in the new episode. Smith was approached about the role before the episode's script was written, and after readily agreeing to take the part of Ross, Renwick wrote the character's dialogue with Smith's northern accent in mind. The actress found accustoming herself to "detective talk" the hardest part of the role, explaining: "You slow down, and then speed up at the end. I kept watching Alan and going, 'I can’t do this figuring out talk.' But I learned from the master." Smith enjoyed the challenge the role presented, stating: "He's [Renwick] written this feisty little northern character, and I am really honoured because he's such a great writer. I have always played chavs and slappers so I wasn't used to being an intelligent young girl."

Renwick has stated that the production of any further Jonathan Creek specials will depend on reception to "The Grinning Man", as well as his own schedule. Davies is amenable to reprising the lead role in future, stating: "If David writes more, I'm happy to do them. Unless they turned up and they were awful - but it hasn't happened so far. And he wouldn't send me an awful one anyway. But I don't know if he will come up with another one. He always says that the writing is so difficult, I'm not sure it gives him any pleasure. But I think the shooting gave him a lot of pleasure this time. He was directing for the first time and I think he really enjoyed it. So, we'll see."

== Reception ==
"The Grinning Man" received a mixed response from critics and was watched by 9.91 million viewers, with a 36% share of the total television audience. The episode beat ITV's Marple in the same time-slot, with Geraldine McEwan's last episode as Agatha Christie's famous sleuth receiving just 4.48 million viewers and a 15% audience share. The Sunday Times' AA Gill was critical of the episode, suggesting that the series had been revived: "because of some dire piece of market research where they asked single, lonely, overweight, over-40 women who keep cats and believe in ghosts who they fancied most on television and Alan Davies must have beaten Huw Edwards by a woolly head." Of the episode itself, he wrote: "It skids between procedural whodunit realism and cartoonish fantasy in a way that defies belief and interest. It is a dull confusion of unknotted loose ends that breaks its own rules, suspends common sense and dumps so much unexplained plot that all suspense drains away through the holes in the story." The Herald's Alasdair McKay was critical of Davies' acting in the episode, writing that: "it really is difficult to tell the difference between the comedian and the accidental detective in David Renwick's comedy drama. Davies doesn't act, he tries to stay awake, occasionally pausing for a cryptic insight." While The Scotsman's Paul Whitelaw similarly noted that Davies appeared to be playing "a slightly grumpier version" of himself, he was "quite impressed" by Davies performance, having never seen him act before. Whitelaw found that "the episode itself left a lot to be desired", writing that its central mystery was "solid" and its solution was "satisfyingly creepy", but that "At two hours in length it was fatally overstretched [...] It was as though Renwick, who also directed, had been given 120 minutes to fill without having enough material to fill them – the narrative equivalent of an interminable jam session based around some fundamentally decent riffs." Steve Pratt, writing for The Northern Echo, was similarly critical of the episode's length, deeming the Adam Klaus subplot "nonsense" which "could easily be removed without loss". Pratt suggested that "This would also help reduce the overlong two-hour running time, during which my attention wandered more often than it should have done." The Observer's Euan Ferguson shared a similar sentiment, writing that the episode:

...was long, at two hours, but writer/director David Renwick had helped us here in our tea-making and loo-going by including an almost entirely unwatchable sub-plot involving a sleazy magician and a porn star; as soon as it segued back to this, it was time for the viewer to leap to race for the kettle. What was going on with this bit? Had Renwick written it with his feet, in the bath or something? Then gone through it removing all traces of point or humour, then dropped it actually into the bath, then torn it up, then asked for it to be quickly rewritten by, say, an ant?

— Euan Ferguson, The Observer

Unlike McKay and Gill, however, Ferguson praised both Davies' acting and the episode as a whole, deeming it "the best thing on television all week". He opined that Davies: "plays Creek to easy perfection: mumbling, lugubrious, quietly brilliant", and called the plot "involving, intriguing, [and] original", stating that it "did the thing all good thrillers, books or films, do of getting you actively, cleverly involved in thinking you can see the answer before anyone else. You couldn't." The List's Brian Donaldson was also positive about the episode, calling it "surprisingly splendid festive fare", in which "The twists and resolutions were, to this watcher at least, as well hidden as Davies’ ears underneath that shaggy bonce." The Times' Tim Teeman deemed the episode "comfort television", commenting on its "rambling pace" and writing that: "Our hero was brainy and cranky and the show itself awkward, funny and idiosyncratic (as you'd expect from the creator, writer and director David Renwick)." The Daily Telegraph' Gerard O'Donovan agreed that the episode felt "comfy and familiar", but also found its run-time overstretched, writing that it:

...might have made for terrifically good, refreshingly unsentimental fun had it not been for the fact that the episode was commissioned to run for two hours. That's a good 30 minutes longer than the show's ever been stretched before, and an hour beyond its natural span. Expanding to fit necessitated getting Creek and Joey to stall, stumble and scratch their bonces ineffectually at each other all the time while writer David Renwick desperately padded out the story with ever more unlikely twists and turns, zig-zagging down incredible subplots involving the magician's scheme to kidnap and murder his assistant, and the terrible betrayal that lay behind his mother's acquisition of an oil painting by Hieronymus Bosch. In the end, by the time the secret of the original mystery was unlocked, the only room one really feared never being able to escape from was the one with the telly in it.

— Gerard O'Donovan, The Daily Telegraph

Of Smith's performance as Joey, O'Donovan opined that: "For most drama series the presence of a key new character would have a tangible impact. But not Jonathan Creek, where characterisation has never been done in anything but the broadest brush strokes. Both Caroline Quentin and Julia Sawalha have previously filled the generic role of Creek's pushy, inquisitive partner pretty much interchangeably. Smith was no different. Ten minutes in and we'd forgotten she was anyone new." In contrast, Mark Wright, reviewing the episode for The Stage, praised Smith's performance as Joey, deeming her to be "a much more satisfying sidekick" than Julia Sawalha's Carla Borrego. He enjoyed the on-screen relationship between the two lead actors, writing that: "it’s the interplay between Davies and Smith that makes this really special." Scotland on Sunday's Chitra Ramaswamy discussed the nostalgia invoked by the series' return, alongside The Royle Family, Blackadder and Shooting Stars—other major shows which returned for 2008 Christmas specials. Ramaswamy wrote: "all the comforting, well kent faces are back to soothe us through these dismal times. In a culture that is becoming more and more risk-averse, it's the oldies but goodies that we trust." Sian Brewis for the Leicester Mercury also considered this nostalgia angle, but concluded that: "Jonathan Creek is the sort of auld acquaintance you’re happy to see once a year – any more than that, you feel, and his mannerisms would start to grate." She deemed the episode: "Less a blast from the past as a shuffling "excuse me". Conversely, Anne Pickles for the News and Star wrote that a one-off special was not enough, and "what we really wanted was a brand new series". Pickles said of the episode: "It’s the gentle, facially expressive, deeply sceptical, somehow slightly daft performance of Davies as Creek that makes this sleuthing drama such a glory. But a one-off? Oh come on... you can do better than that."
