= Shipley Preceptory =

Shipley Preceptory was a priory in West Sussex, England. It was founded by templar Sire de Reneville, whose brother had founded the town of Shipley, circa 1125 and existed until 1893, with William de Egendon its last preceptor.

The site of the preceptory is thought to be what is now the southern part of the churchyard of St Mary's Church.
