= The Judas Tree (Jonathan Creek) =

- Jonathan Creek episode
- Episode no.: Episode 27
- Directed by: David Renwick
- Written by: David Renwick
- Original air date: 4 April 2010
- Running time: 94 minutes

Guest appearances
- Paul McGann as Hugo Dore; Doreen Mantle as Mrs Gantry; Ian McNeice as Father Roderick Alberic; Natalie Walter as Emily Somerton; Sasha Behar as Harriet Dore; Sofia Hayat as Selima El Sharad; Felix Dexter as Sebastian Tench

Episode chronology
← Previous "The Grinning Man"	Next → "The Clue of the Savant's Thumb"

"The Judas Tree" is the twenty-seventh episode of the British crime drama series Jonathan Creek. The feature-length episode was written and directed by series creator David Renwick, and premiered on BBC One on 4 April 2010. The episode focuses on a series of mysteries surrounding housekeeper Emily Somerton (Natalie Walter), including a vanishing house and the murder of her employer Harriet Dore (Sasha Behar). Alan Davies returns as the series' titular sleuth, Jonathan Creek, while Sheridan Smith reprises her role as his assistant Joey Ross, and Stuart Milligan returns as Jonathan's boss, magician Adam Klaus.

Financial constraints at the BBC delayed broadcast of the episode from January until April 2010. Davies' fee for the episode was reduced by 25 per cent, and the production's design budget was also subject to a significant reduction, as the BBC attempted to achieve efficiencies with the show. The episode was watched by 5.45 million viewers, and received mixed reviews from critics. David Brown of the Radio Times and Vicky Frost of The Guardian both praised the plot and Davies' performance, however Paul Whitelaw of The Scotsman felt that the series ought to be retired.

== Plot ==
The episode begins in 1988, with flatmates Emily (Florence Hall) and Kim (Susanne Ahme) lost while driving. Emily sees a nearby house across a field, but when she turns around again the house has vanished. She begins to cross the field, but is seized about the ankle by an old man (Sean Buckley) in the grass. Emily beats him off and flees.

In the present day, Emily begins working as a housekeeper at Green Lanterns house, owned by crime novelist Hugo Dore (Paul McGann) and his wife Harriet. The Dore's other housekeeper, Mrs Gantry, (Doreen Mantle) tells Emily about Green Lanterns' mysterious past. In the late nineteenth century, the house was owned by Dr Thadeus Northcote (Kevin McGowan) and his wife (Amanda Hadingue). Dr Northcote had an affair with his Egyptian housekeeper, Selima El Sharad (Sofia Hayat), who supposedly put a curse on him when the affair ended. Selima accurately predicted the exact date and time of his death, and no foul play was ever discovered.

Emily contacts paranormal investigator Joey Ross about strange events at Green Lanterns, including a ghostly apparition in the woodshed and threatening letters sent to Harriet in Emily's handwriting. One of them seems to say 'Beware the approach of ISIS.' Joey and her investigative partner Jonathan Creek agree to take on the case. However shortly after their arrival they get stuck in a cellar, and Creek realises they mistook the handwriting and it means 15:15. Harriet is defenestrated, and identifies Emily as her killer, showing part of her dress at which point Emily sees a piece is missing, before dying in Hugo's arms. After Emily is arrested, Jonathan solves the 1988 mystery, postulating that house Emily saw was actually a standing film set which blew over in the wind when she turned away. He suggests that the man in the field was actually the site watchman, reaching out to Emily in an attempt to free himself from beneath the set. He and Joey continue their investigation at Green Lanterns, and Jonathan is also able to solve the second mystery. He deduces that Selima had a pocket-watch constructed for Dr Northcote containing lethal hydrogen cyanide, beneath a thin sheet of glass which could be shattered by a high-pitched noise at a specific tone. At the predicted time of his death, Dr Northcote took out his pocket-watch, and a nearby Selima screamed at the required frequency to break the glass, releasing the hydrogen cyanide which killed the doctor on the spot. She claimed to have screamed as she saw Death approaching. Jonathan additionally theorises that Hugo framed Emily for Harriet's death, but is unable to convince the jury at her trial, who find Emily guilty.

Still determined to solve the case, Jonathan and Joey return to Green Lanterns and follow Hugo to the Judas Tree in the grounds, where they are surprised to find Harriet alive. It transpires that she and Hugo faked her death, framing Emily as a means of revenge. On the same day Emily encountered the man in the field in 1988, she and Kim car-jacked Hugo's mentally impaired older brother Danny (Gregor Henderson-Begg). When he tried to defend himself, Kim bludgeoned him to death with a stone and hid his body. He survived long enough to draw a picture of his attackers. The jury at their trial ruled in their favour, and years later Harriet persuaded Hugo to exact vigilante justice. Harriet kidnapped Kim, who is shown being drugged next to Harriet's car, then bound and gagged in the house, dressed them both in identical clothes, and threw Kim from the window to her death. She then switched places with her for long enough to implicate Emily in the attack, taking advantage of the fact that Harriet spent so little time in the village that nobody who knew her was likely to see her body after her 'death'. Although their crime is uncovered, Harriet reminds Jonathan that he has already failed to convince a jury once, and is likely to again. Emily remains in prison, while she and Hugo are free (although Jonathan admits later that Emily's lack of remorse about the death of Hugo's brother – which he is certain she remembers despite Joey suggesting that she repressed the trauma of it – leaves him with little real sympathy for her).

A running sub-plot throughout the episode sees Joey begin working as an assistant to Jonathan's boss, magician Adam Klaus (Stuart Milligan). Adam receives a spate of negative publicity after obliviously making comments which are construed as bigoted. Videos featuring him are edited and posted on the internet, depicting him dressed as Hitler and in blackface. Jonathan explains to Joey how the editing can be performed, and she then suggests to Adam that he perform a routine dressed as a wizard, a costume which is easily manipulated to make it appear that he was wearing Ku Klux Klan robes. The torch he carries turns into a flaming cross. At the end he grabs a sword and angrily asks whose idea it was to dress up as a wizard at which point Joey walks in. Jonathan says it is ironic as it is just coming up to 15:15.

The episode seethes with literary references to ghost story writer M. R. James, whose tales have often been adapted by the BBC as part of their A Ghost Story for Christmas sequence. The basic premise of warning a victim of their approaching death is the plot of 'Casting The Runes', and the episode features characters named 'Karswell' (after Julian Karswell in this story) along with an 'Alberic' (refer 'Canon Alberic's Scrapbook').

A further ghost story literary reference exists in the naming of the character 'Thadeus Northcote'. The author Amyas Northcote published a collection of ghost stories called 'A Ghostly Company' (1922), which includes the famous tale 'Brickett Bottom'. In this story, a young woman sees a house that her sister can't see, and after setting out to visit it alone the next day, mysteriously vanishes - reflecting key elements of this Jonathan Creek episode.

== Production ==
"The Judas Tree" is the second feature-length Jonathan Creek special produced since the series concluded in 2004. The first such episode, "The Grinning Man", aired in January 2009, after series creator David Renwick revived the drama as a means of deferring retirement. Renwick both wrote and directed "The Judas Tree", while Rosemary McGowan served as producer. Filming of the episode began in September 2009, and took around 20 days to complete. The series' executives hoped that the episode would air on 1 January 2010, a year after the broadcast of "The Grinning Man", however due to financial constraints at the BBC its broadcast was delayed until Easter 2010, in the next tax year. "The Judas Tree" will be released on Region 2 DVD on 12 April 2010.

The episode sees the return of Alan Davies as the series' titular sleuth Jonathan Creek, Sheridan Smith as his crime-solving partner Joey Ross and Stuart Milligan as his boss, magician Adam Klaus. Doreen Mantle guest-stars as Mrs Gantry, in a role created specially for her by Renwick, with whom she worked on his BBC comedy series One Foot in the Grave. Paul McGann plays Hugo Dore, and Sasha Behar appears as his wife Harriet. Behar had auditioned for and been offered a role in the series before, but ultimately turned it down in favour of playing Maya Sharma in the ITV soap opera Coronation Street.

In 2009, the BBC came under criticism for the high salaries paid to its top executives and performers. The Scotsman reported that Mark Thompson, Director-General of the station, would be cutting all salaries of over £100,000 by at least a quarter. As part of the pay-cut, Davies' fee for "The Judas Tree" was reduced by 25 per cent. Davies was dismayed that the pay-cut meant he was being paid less than when working on the series twelve years previously, and additionally claimed that the series' design budget had been cut by over 50 per cent, causing him concern that the quality of the episode may suffer. A spokesperson for the BBC denied the allegation, stating that efficiencies were being made with the show, but not to the extent Davies stated.

Davies stated that he hoped Renwick would continue to create new episodes of Jonathan Creek, but thought another full series would be unlikely. Series takes five months to film, which Davies described as a "hefty commitment" and "quite hard-going", and that it is difficult to create the number of mysteries required and present them in a 50–60 minute format.

== Reception ==
"The Judas Tree" averaged 5.45 million viewers, attaining a 21.3% audience share in its timeslot, and received mixed reviews from critics. David Brown of the Radio Times likened the episode to a Sherlock Holmes mystery, commenting that it has "the definite feel of a Baker Street consulting room about it." He praised the "hoodwinking and sleight of hand" involved in the plot, as well as Davies' "extremely likeable" performance, however felt that the Adam Klaus sub-plot "detracts from an otherwise well-burnished brainteaser of an episode." The Guardian's Vicky Frost complimented Sheridan and Davies' performances and deemed the plot "satisfyingly fiendish", but felt that the episode's conclusion was rushed. The Scotsman's Paul Whitelaw criticised the episode, deeming it "an unsatisfying tale, overindulgent and padded with a superfluous 'comedy' sub-plot" which: "sprints across that delicate line between ingenious folderol and implausible, convoluted rubbish." Of Davies's performance, Whitelaw observed: "he never stretches himself beyond an expression of subdued petulance, as though resentful of having to act in the first place." He concluded his review by suggesting that Renwick ought to retire the Jonathan Creek series.
