= Jonathan Creek =

British television mystery crime-comedy drama series (1997–2016)

- Opening title
- Genre: Mystery Drama
- Written by: David Renwick
- Directed by: Sandy Johnson; Keith Washington; Marcus Mortimer; Richard Holthouse; Christine Gernon; David Renwick; David Sant
- Starring: Alan Davies; Caroline Quentin (1997–2000); Julia Sawalha (2001–2004); Sheridan Smith (2009–2013); Sarah Alexander (2013–2016)
- Opening theme: "Danse macabre" by Camille Saint-Saëns (arr by Julian Stewart Lindsay)
- Country of origin: United Kingdom
- Original language: English
- No. of series: 5
- No. of episodes: 32 (list of episodes)

Production
- Running time: Various (49–119 mins)

Original release
- Network: BBC One
- Release: 10 May 1997 – 28 December 2016

Jonathan Creek is a British mystery comedy crime drama series produced by the BBC and written by David Renwick. It stars Alan Davies as the title character, who works as a creative consultant to a stage magician while also solving seemingly supernatural mysteries through his talent for logical deduction and his understanding of illusions.

== Production ==
The series ran semi-regularly from 1997 to 2004, broadcasting for four series and two Christmas specials, initially co-starring Caroline Quentin as Creek's collaborator, writer Maddy Magellan. After Quentin's departure in 2001, Julia Sawalha joined the cast as new character Carla Borrego, a theatrical agent turned television presenter. Following a five-year hiatus, the series returned for a one-off special on 1 January 2009, "The Grinning Man", which featured Sheridan Smith as another paranormal investigator with whom Creek joins forces. A further 90-minute special, "The Judas Tree", was filmed in October 2009 and broadcast on 4 April 2010. A third special, "The Clue of the Savant's Thumb", was shown at Easter 2013. Smith had previously worked with David Renwick on his sitcom Love Soup.

Sheridan Smith reprised her role as Joey in both specials. Series 5 comprised three episodes and featured Sarah Alexander as Jonathan's wife Polly. These episodes were shown at 9 pm on Friday 28 February, 7 and 14 March 2014 respectively.

In 2014, conflicting reports surfaced regarding Alan Davies's view of the show. In one article published online he was said to be "happy to do Jonathan Creek for another ten years" and praised Renwick's talent as a writer.

On 4 March 2016, it was reported that the series would be returning for another 90-minute one-off special, with filming to begin in summer 2016. The episode, "Daemons' Roost", aired on 28 December 2016. Alexander returned as Jonathan Creek's wife Polly, alongside guest stars Warwick Davis, Emun Elliott and Rosalind March.

The cult success of the series won it the BAFTA for Best Drama Series in 1998. It was produced by the BBC's in-house Entertainment department rather than the Drama department – because Renwick preferred working with people he knew rather than the people at Drama who might not share his vision. It has included guest-stars such as Bob Monkhouse, Griff Rhys Jones, Rik Mayall, Jack Dee, Bill Bailey, John Bird, Nigel Planer and Ade Edmondson, who are mainly associated with comedy, but who gave straight performances.

The first two series were broadcast in the U.S. on a number of PBS stations, while the remainder aired on BBC America.

== Concept and casting ==
Renwick wanted to write a detective series that dealt with the actual work of detection rather than action, which most crime dramas appeared to focus on at the time. Also, whereas most of these were about who did it (Inspector Morse or Taggart) and why it was done (Cracker), this new series would be about how it was done, with such tropes as murders committed in locked rooms, a person being in two places at once, or impossible thefts. Finding a culprit would still be part of the detective's job, but the emphasis would be on discovering how the crime was committed.

Magic would play an important part of the series, but it would be in the form of tricks and sleight-of-hand used by stage magicians to audiences. The programme often exposed how such tricks are actually done, but in a way quite banal compared to the trick itself.

The series would also focus on the relationship between Creek and his collaborator Maddy Magellan, a writer who often uses dishonest means in order to expose miscarriages of justice. The relationship would be a mainly platonic one, though they do at some stage consummate their relationship only to agree that it must never happen again. (In his early planning, Renwick had thought that Maddy should be Creek's stepmother and that they would investigate crime in memory of his murdered father. However, he decided that the concept of the avenging son was far too "Batman" and in the series Creek's parents are mentioned as having moved to America.)

Quentin was Renwick's first choice for Maddy Magellan, but the casting of Creek proved something of a problem. Renwick had wanted Nicholas Lyndhurst, but he turned it down. Rik Mayall was also offered the part, but was, at the time, busy with stage work (he would later guest-star in a Christmas special of the series). Hugh Laurie showed a great deal of interest and agreed to take the part, but later turned it down as he could not figure out Creek's motivations for investigating the cases Maddy involves him in, especially when he shows so much reluctance in some of the episodes.

Others who were tried for the part included Nigel Planer (who would later guest star) and Angus Deayton (who had already worked with Renwick and director Susan Belbin on One Foot in the Grave). Almost a dozen actors were considered before Susan Belbin saw Davies during a rehearsal for a sitcom. Davies was invited round to talk to Renwick and "turned up in his duffle coat with straggly hair and a broad grin [and] was self-evidently the closest match yet to Creek as we had always seen him".

The role of Adam Klaus was originally cast to Anthony Head in 1997 in the pilot episode ("The Wrestler's Tomb"). However, after accepting the role of Rupert Giles on Buffy the Vampire Slayer, Head was unable to play Adam Klaus in later episodes, leaving the way clear for Stuart Milligan to take over the role after the first series.

== Cast ==
Actor	Character	P	Series 1				Series 2						S1	Series 3						S2	Series 4						S3	S4	S5	Series 5			S6
Actor	Character	P	1	2	3	4	1	2	3	4	5	6	S1	1	2	3	4	5	6	S2	1	2	3	4	5	6	S3	S4	S5	1	2	3	S6
Main
Alan Davies	Jonathan Creek																																
Caroline Quentin	Maddy Magellan																																
Julia Sawalha	Carla Borrego																																
Sheridan Smith	Joey Ross																																
Sarah Alexander	Polly Creek																																
Recurring
Anthony Head	Adam Klaus																																
Stuart Milligan	Adam Klaus																																
Geoffrey McGivern	Barry Opper																																
Adrian Edmondson	Brendan Baxter																																
Rik Mayall	DI Gideon Pryke																																
Bill Bailey	Kenny Starkiss																																
John Bird	Horace Greeley																																
Actor	Character	P	1	2	3	4	1	2	3	4	5	6	S1	1	2	3	4	5	6	S2	1	2	3	4	5	6	S3	S4	S5	1	2	3	S6
Actor	Character	P	Series 1				Series 2						S1	Series 3						S2	Series 4						S3	S4	S5	Series 5			S6

=== Guest cast ===
Many well-known actors have appeared in the series, including Bob Monkhouse, Rik Mayall (who had been considered to play Jonathan) and Jack Dee who are better known for their comedy roles. Other guest stars, both comedy and straight, have included: Rob Jarvis who made two appearances, each time as a different character, Colin Baker, Sheila Gish, Alistair McGowan, John Bluthal, Lysette Anthony, Simon Day, Selina Cadell, Peter Davison, Pippa Haywood, Dermot Crowley, Deborah Grant, Amanda Holden, Nicola Walker, Francis Matthews, Griff Rhys Jones, Maxine Peake, Rebecca Front, Terrence Hardiman, Michael Brandon, Jim Bowen, Dinah Sheridan, Hattie Hayridge, Steven Berkoff, Mary Tamm, Benjamin Whitrow, Bill Bailey, Sophie Thompson, Maureen Lipman, Celia Imrie, Judy Parfitt, Katherine Parkinson, Paul McGann, Ian McNeice, Joanna Lumley, Paula Wilcox, Raquel Cassidy, Kieran Hodgson, June Whitfield, Josie Lawrence and Warwick Davis.

Adrian Edmondson appeared in the fourth series in a recurring role. Jonathan Ross, Michael Grade and Bamber Gascoigne have all appeared as themselves.

=== Cast links to other Renwick productions ===
Actors Annette Crosbie, Peter Copley, Jonathan Kydd, Brian Murphy, John Bluthal, Hannah Gordon, Nick Maloney and John Bird made appearances (Bird as two different characters, one of which was a recurring role), and all worked with Renwick on One Foot in The Grave. Additionally Bird worked with Renwick again on his BBC Radio 4 miniseries Desolation Jests in late 2016.

Tamsin Greig, Georgie Glen, Sheridan Smith and Sara Markland worked with Renwick on his sitcom Love Soup.

Adrian Edmondson had a leading role in Renwick's 1993 miniseries If You See God, Tell Him.

Doreen Mantle has appeared in eighteen episodes of One Foot in the Grave, one episode of Love Soup, as well as one episode of Jonathan Creek.

Renwick himself made appearances in two episodes, something which he also did in two of his other notable productions.

== Character development ==
The series follows the exploits of Jonathan Creek and (in the first three series) Maddy Magellan, a pushy investigative journalist, as they work together to solve crimes where others have failed.

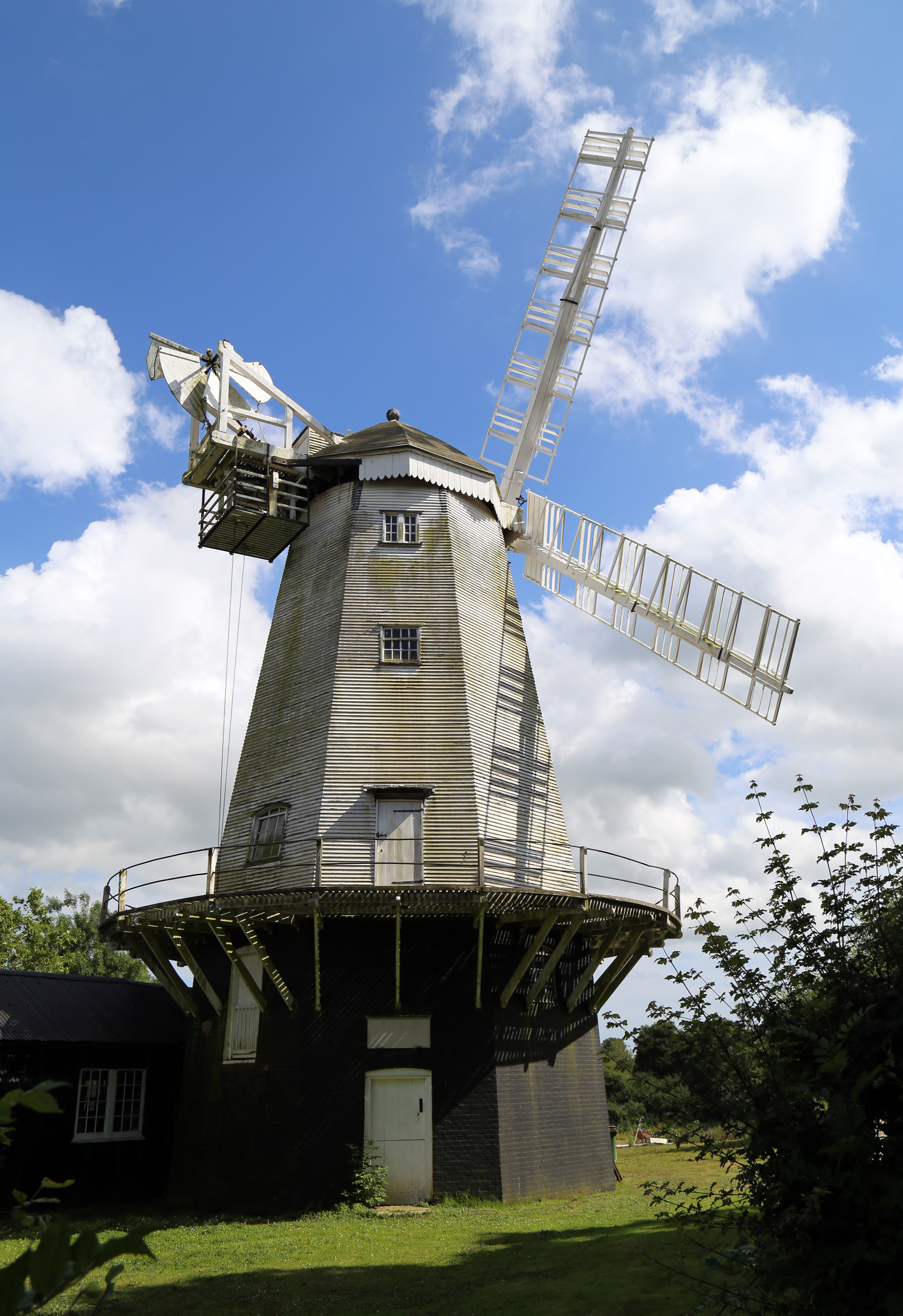
King's Mill, Shipley, West Sussex, used as Creek's initial windmill home in the series

Creek is a somewhat cynical designer of illusions for stage magician Adam Klaus. He originally lived in a windmill in West Sussex. (Note: The actual windmill used is in Shipley, West Sussex) His ingenuity and lateral thinking usually, if not immediately, lead to an unveiling of the intricacies of the crime.

Magellan is a plausible liar who never seems to have trouble sneaking into closed crime scenes (though she is frequently unceremoniously ejected), and Klaus is a flamboyant performer with a sinister stage persona who is really a dull-witted, insensitive womaniser. In some instances, his magic tricks go comically wrong.

The programme usually features 'impossible crimes'; examples include an offence having been committed in a sealed environment from which no criminal could have escaped (a "locked room mystery"), paranormal thefts and murders. Creek solves these cases using his knowledge of misdirection and illusion. No matter how fantastic the crime appears to be at first, he always finds a rational explanation, giving the character a passing resemblance to stage magician turned paranormal investigator James Randi.

As the series progresses, Creek gradually changes from an asocial anorak to a man with a great deal of wit and charm. This helps to fuel the romantic thread between him and Maddy. Jonathan's trademark duffle coat worn in the first series was actually Davies' own coat that he wore to the auditions; it helped him win the role, as the writer and producers thought it suited the character. After the first series, Jonathan's coat was supplied by the wardrobe department. Davies kept the original at his home, and wore it again for the 2009 New Year special.

For the 2001 Christmas special and thereafter, Quentin declined to appear. As such, a second supporting role was introduced: theatrical agent Carla Borrego, played by Julia Sawalha. After her first appearance, the character married TV producer Brendan Baxter (Adrian Edmondson), and she became a TV presenter. A third supporting role was introduced when the show returned in 2009 after a five-year hiatus. From "The Grinning Man" onwards, Creek was assisted by online paranormal investigator Joey Ross, played by Sheridan Smith. As Smith was unable to appear in the fifth series due to other commitments, she was replaced by Sarah Alexander as Creek's wife and newest sidekick, who featured in the episode "The Clue of the Savant's Thumb."

Part of the humour comes from the fact that Jonathan often does not want to get involved in other people's problems, and has to be pressured into it by Maddy, Carla or Joey. In "The Scented Room", which centred around a theft from a critic who had lambasted Adam's act, he took great delight in announcing that he had solved the crime but wasn't going to tell anybody how it was done. Initially, Jonathan was only brought in to investigate because he was asked by Maddy due to her having a professional connection to the crime in her role as a journalist, or because it involved an old friend of theirs (such as one case featuring Jonathan being contacted by an old friend of his mother's after her husband was impaled by a sword in a sealed room). As time went on, he acquired a more significant reputation and was independently recruited by such varied contacts as a chief of police or even the United States military.

Over time, the show became noticeably darker, with Jonathan investigating psychopaths, pimps, gangsters and corrupt policemen, who stood in stark contrast to the duplicitous suburbanites of earlier series; one story even saw Maddy being held at gunpoint by a gang member who was only just disarmed thanks to a card trick Jonathan had picked up recently. The 2009 special contained a hybrid of elements from earlier and later series, with the lethal engineering element, somewhat reminiscent of "Mother Redcap", and the torture and murder of a young woman as she is held dangling by a rope in the middle of a room. This theme continued on in "The Judas Tree" with a murderer being killed and her accomplice then being framed for the crime.

In the 2013 episode "The Clue of the Savant's Thumb", Jonathan Creek had left the world of theatre and magic and is now a high-powered businessman with a wife, Polly. Despite this, and his disillusionment with his old work due to the lack of real awe received when he made his announcements, he has still returned to his roots when faced with particularly baffling cases, such as a dead man vanishing from a locked room. During the fifth series, he and his wife move into her family's old village house, with Polly attempting to encourage Jonathan to become part of the local lifestyle, but Jonathan is distracted by various minor mysteries, as well as enthusiastic fans asking for his assistance. The Christmas 2016 special sees a similar format to past specials as an old secret – in this case, an apparently demonic ritual where women witness their lovers thrown through the air into a fire – plays a key role in the death of a man Jonathan once cleared of murder (although the subsequent investigation prompts Jonathan to realise that the man actually did commit the crime of which he was accused).

== Episodes ==
Series
Series	Episodes	Originally released	
Series	Episodes	First released	Last released
1	5	10 May 1997	7 June 1997
2	6	24 January 1998	28 February 1998
Special (1998)		24 December 1998	
3	6	27 November 1999	2 January 2000
Special (2001)		26 December 2001	
4	6	1 March 2003	28 February 2004
Specials (2009–2013)		1 January 2009	1 April 2013
5	3	28 February 2014	14 March 2014
Special (2016)		28 December 2016	

== Music ==
The distinctive theme tune is an arrangement by Julian Stewart Lindsay of Camille Saint-Saëns's Danse Macabre. Lindsay wrote the incidental music for the first three series, after which it was written by Rick Wentworth.

== Broadcast ==
=== Ratings ===
Series	Series premiere	Series finale	No. of episodes	Avg. UK viewers (in millions)	Most watched episode	UK Viewers (millions)
1	10 May 1997	7 June 1997	5	8.43	"Jack in the Box"	9.35
2	24 January 1998	28 February 1998	6	9.70	"Mother Redcap"	10.92
3	27 November 1999	2 January 2000	6	10.69	"Miracle in Crooked Lane"	11.45
4	1 March 2003	28 February 2004	6	8.97	"Angel Hair"	9.9
Specials	1 January 2009	1 April 2013	3	8.43	"The Grinning Man"	9.91
5	28 February 2014	14 March 2014	3	7.36	"The Letters of Septimus Noone"	8.09

=== Awards and nominations ===
Year	Award	Category	Recipient(s)	Result	Ref(s)
1998	BAFTA TV Award	Best Drama Series	Susan Belbin, Sandy Johnson, Marcus Mortimer, David Renwick	Won	
1998	BAFTA TV Award	Best Design	John Asbridge, Jonathan Taylor	Nominated	
1998	BAFTA TV Award	Best Sound (Fiction/Entertainment)	Terry Elms, Craig Irving, Laurie Taylor, Lee Crichlow, Ben Norrington	Nominated	
1998	Broadcasting Press Guild Awards	Writer's Award	David Renwick	Won	
1998	National Television Awards	Most Popular Drama Series		Won	
1998	National Television Awards	Most Popular Actor	Alan Davies	Nominated	
1998	RTS Awards	Newcomer - On Screen	Alan Davies	Nominated	
1999	BAFTA TV Award	Best Drama Series	Verity Lambert, Keith Washington, David Renwick, Sandy Johnson	Nominated	
1999	British Comedy Awards	Best TV Comedy Drama	Episode: "Black Canary"	Nominated	
1999	RTS Awards	Best Drama Series		Won	
2004	British Comedy Award	Best TV Comedy Drama		Nominated	

== Adaptations and possible return ==
=== Similarity to other television programmes ===
Other television programmes have utilised the formula of a magician helping police to solve crimes, such as the U.S.-made programmes The Magician, starring Bill Bixby, which aired in 1973–74, and 1986's short-lived Blacke's Magic, starring Hal Linden.

=== Attempts at remakes ===
There have been three attempts to make a U.S. version of Jonathan Creek. The first involved Castle Rock, the production company behind series such as Seinfeld, but the initial scripts were not felt to be good enough, and Renwick's scripts were rejected by CBS. The second attempt, also by Renwick, was for Whoopi Goldberg and would have included Davies.

=== Possible return ===
In 2021, Davies commented that Renwick "wouldn’t tell me if he had written a script. But if he did write one, I would do it, out of loyalty to him. I can’t see it happening, but who knows."

In a 2021 interview, Renwick discussed his retirement from television and referred to "Daemon's Roost" as "the final Jonathan Creek", suggesting an end to the series. Quentin and other former cast members have also made clear that they would return to the show if invited.

=== Stage adaptation ===
In September 2022, it was reported that Renwick had written stage adaptations of the show and that Davies and Quentin had shown interest in reprising their roles. However, the project has been on hold since the COVID-19 pandemic.

=== Novel ===
In June 2026, a Jonathan Creek play script entitled The Fantom of the Acropolis, which Renwick wrote a few years previously but was never produced, was published by Idiot Box Books.

== Home media ==
=== Regions 2 and 4 ===
DVD	Date
Series 1 & 2	16 February 2004
Series 3 & 4 & the Christmas Specials	2 August 2004
Complete Series 1–4 & the Christmas Specials (gold-coloured)	29 November 2004
"The Grinning Man"	19 October 2009
"The Judas Tree"	12 April 2010
Complete Series 1–4 & the Christmas Specials (blue-coloured)	4 October 2010
"The Clue of the Savant's Thumb"	6 May 2013
Series 5	17 March 2014
"Daemons' Roost"	6 February 2017
The Complete Collection (Series 1–5 plus six specials)	6 February 2017

=== Region 1 ===
- Series 1 was released in Region 1 in December 2006.
- Series 2 was released in Region 1 in late 2007.
- Series 3 was released in Region 1 on 20 January 2009.
- Series 4 was released in Region 1 on 19 January 2010.
- The Specials were released in Region 1 on 19 October 2010.
