= Shipley, West Sussex =

Village and parish in West Sussex, England

Coordinates: 50.98539°N 0.37078°W

Shipley
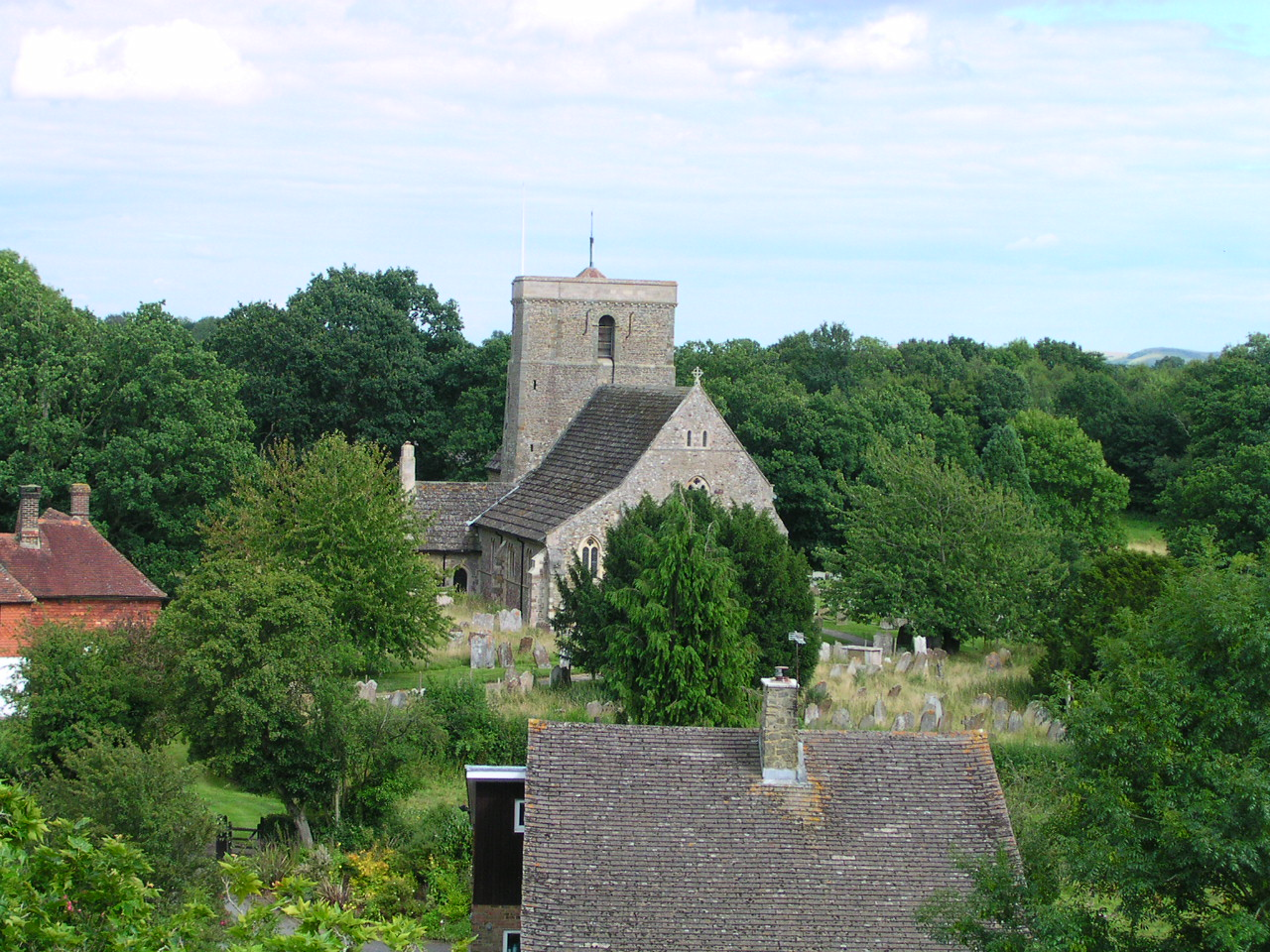
- Church of St. Mary the Virgin, viewed from the windmill

- Location within West Sussex
- Area: 31.26 km^{2} (12.07 sq mi)
- Population: 1,200 (2021 census)
  - Density: 34/km^{2} (88/sq mi)
- OS grid reference: TQ144219
  - London: 37 mi (60 km) NNE
- Civil parish: Shipley
- District: Horsham
- Shire county: West Sussex
- Region: South East
- Country: England
- Sovereign state: United Kingdom
- Post town: HORSHAM
- Postcode district: RH13
- Dialling code: 01403
- Police: Sussex
- Fire: West Sussex
- Ambulance: South East Coast
- UK Parliament: Horsham

Shipley is a village and civil parish in the Horsham District of West Sussex, England. It lies just off the A272 road 6 miles (10 kilometres) north-east of Storrington. The parish includes the village of Coolham and the hamlets of Dragon's Green, Brooks Green and Broomer's Corner.

== History ==
Shipley is first mentioned in a charter of 1073 as Scapeleia, and in the Domesday Book of 1086 as Sepelei. The name derives from the Old English scēap ('sheep') and lēah ('open ground, such as meadow, pasture, or arable land'). Thus it means 'sheep-clearing' or 'sheep-pasture'.

Shipley was home to Hilaire Belloc who in 1906 purchased King's Land, with a house, 5 acres (2 ha) and Shipley Windmill, which was used in the television series Jonathan Creek as Creek's residence.

== Geography ==
The western River Adur flows through the village, where it meets a significant tributary, Lancing Brook.

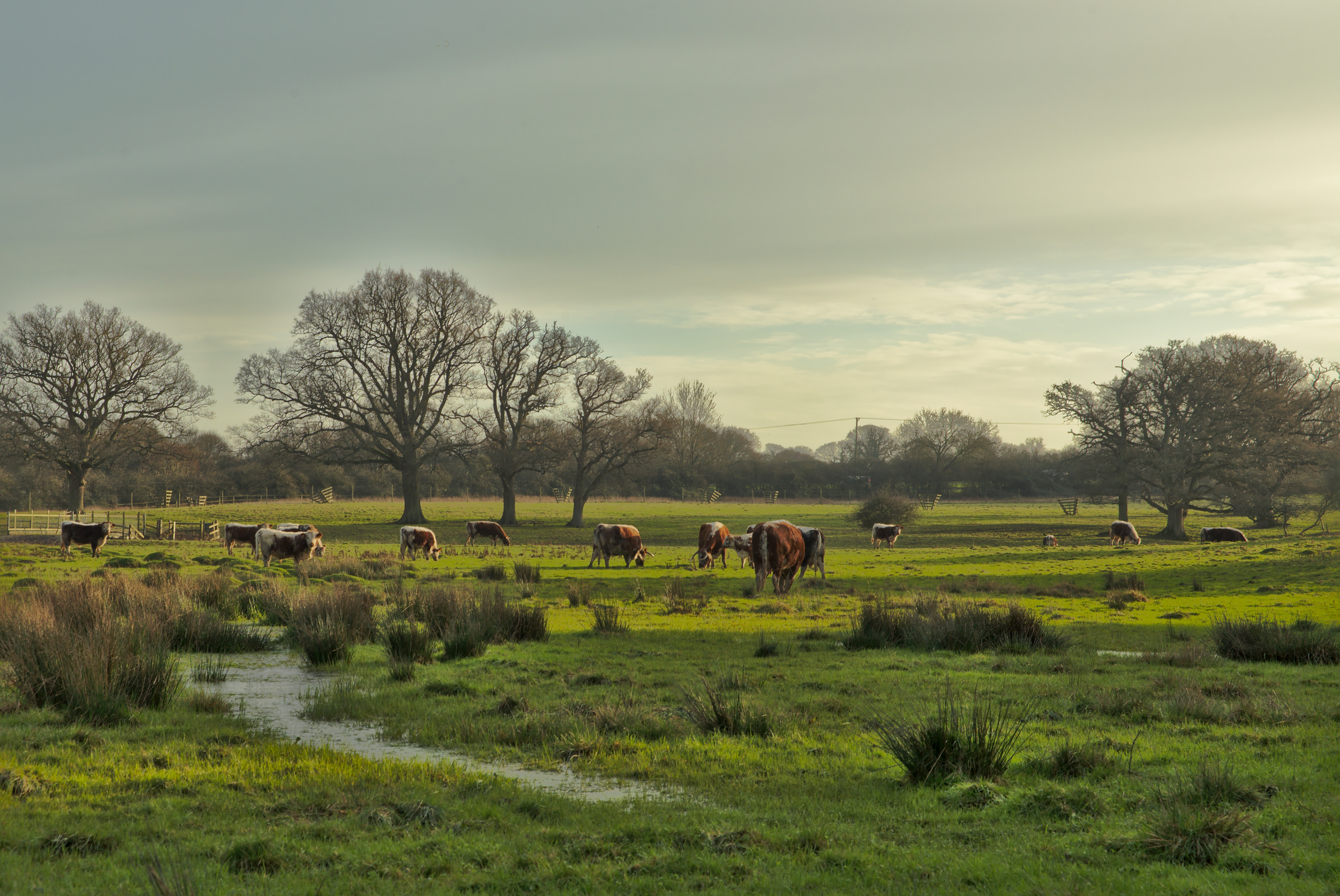
Free-ranging longhorn cattle at Knepp Wildland

The parish has a land area of 3,125 hectares (7,720 acres).

Knepp Wildland is a 3,500-acre (1,400 ha) rewilding project in the parish.

== Demography ==
In the 2001 census 1,075 people lived in 448 households of whom 596 were economically active. At the 2011 census the population included the hamlet of Coolham and increased to a total of 1,147. This had increased to 1,200 as of the 2021 census.

== Landmarks ==
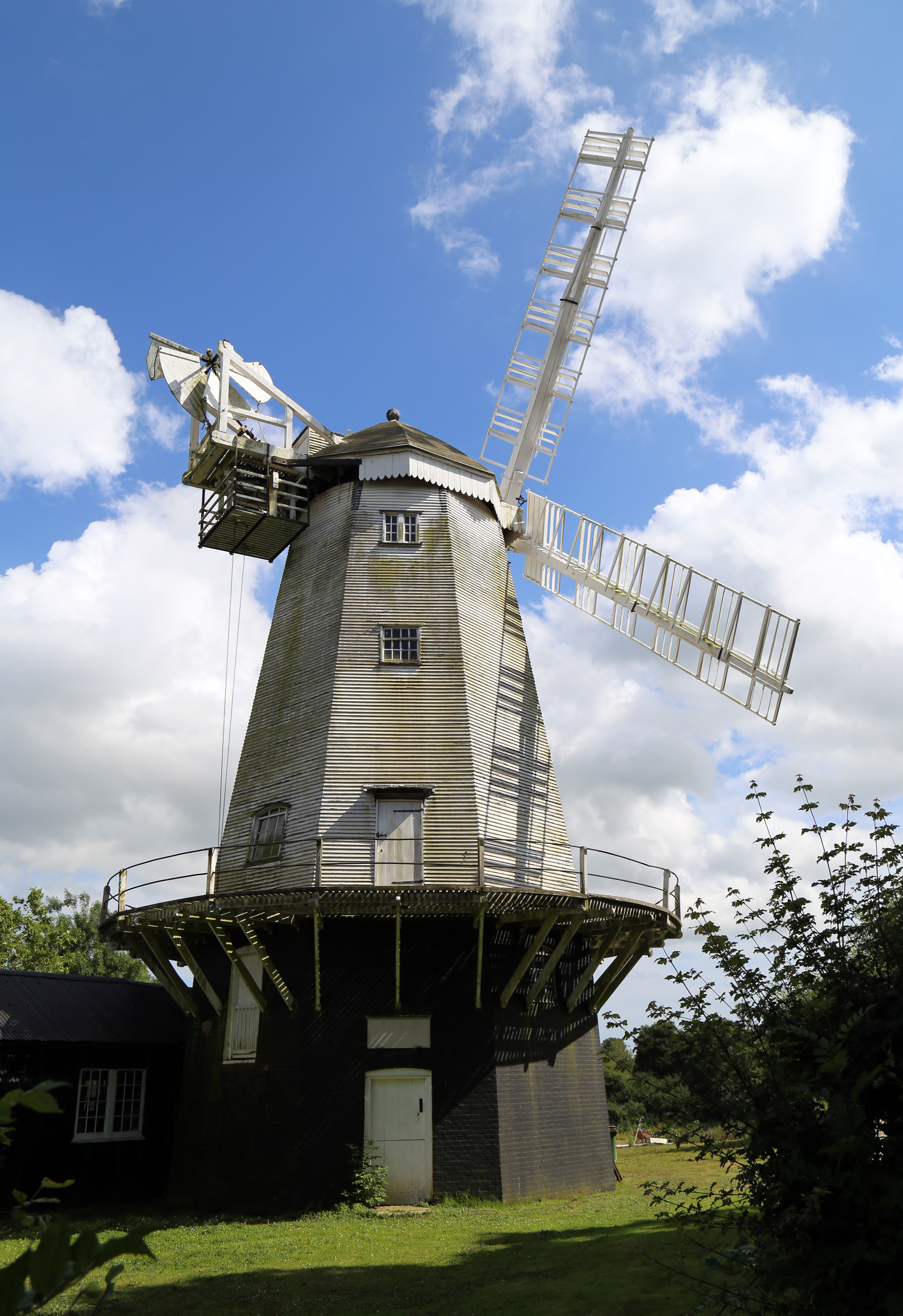
King's Mill

The parish contains the ruins of the medieval Knepp Castle which was likely established by the Braose family and in the 13th century was confiscated by the Crown.

King's Mill was built in 1879 and is a Grade II* listed building.

== Education ==
There are two schools in the parish: William Penn School in Coolham and Shipley CE Primary School. The William Penn School is a Quaker foundation opened in 1973 and named after William Penn. It is a primary school and as of its 2024 Ofsted inspection it had around 80 pupils. The school was rated as requiring improvement. Shipley CE Primary School is a Church of England school which had around 80 pupils when it was inspected in 2024; Ofsted rated the school as good.

== Religion ==
The church of St Mary the Virgin was established in the 12th-century. Some elements survive from this period including the tower, chancel, and a door at the west end of the church. The building was extensively renovated in the late 19th century. It is protected as a Grade I listed building. The churchyard is the burial place of composer John Ireland (1879–1962).
