= Itchingfield =

Village and parish in West Sussex, England

Coordinates: 51.04734°N 0.38655°W

- Location within West Sussex
- Area: 10.91 km^{2} (4.21 sq mi)
- Population: 1,477 2001 Census; 1,565 (2011 Census)
  - Density: 135/km^{2} (350/sq mi)
- OS grid reference: TQ131287
  - London: 33 miles (53 km) NNE
- Civil parish: Itchingfield
- District: Horsham
- Shire county: West Sussex
- Region: South East
- Country: England
- Sovereign state: United Kingdom
- Post town: HORSHAM
- Postcode district: RH13
- Dialling code: 01403
- Police: Sussex
- Fire: West Sussex
- Ambulance: South East Coast
- UK Parliament: Horsham
- Website: Parish Council

Itchingfield is a small village and civil parish in the Horsham district of West Sussex, England. It lies on the Barns Green to Broadbridge Heath road 2.7 miles (4.3 km) southwest of Horsham.

The main settlement in the parish is Barns Green.

== History ==
The village's origins may lie with the Romans. This is suggested by the discovery of tiles in the parish.

The Parish Church, located in Itchingfield Hamlet, is over 900 years old, built in 1125. The Church still has several windows and a couple of walls from the original building.

== Gallery ==
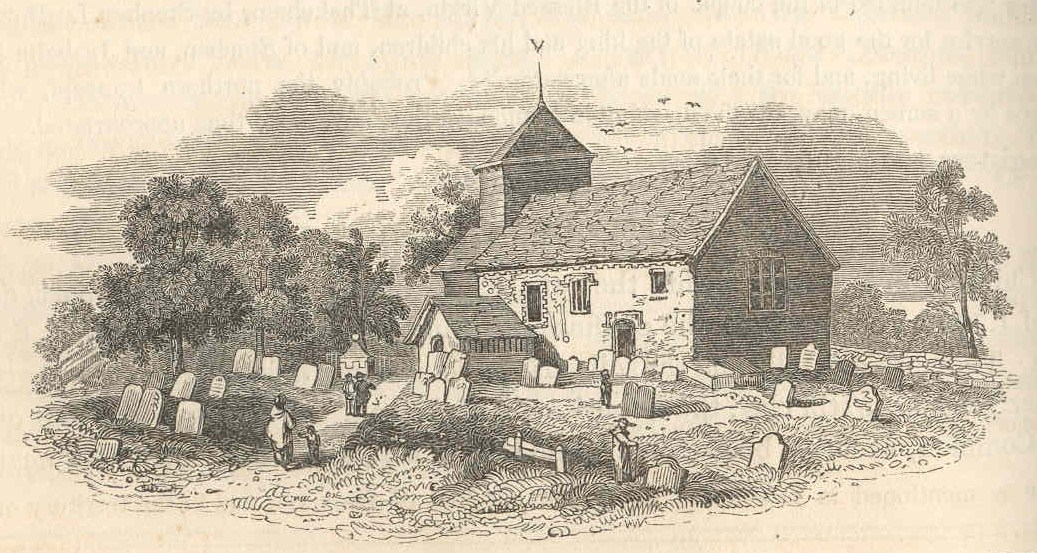
St. Nicolas c. 1830

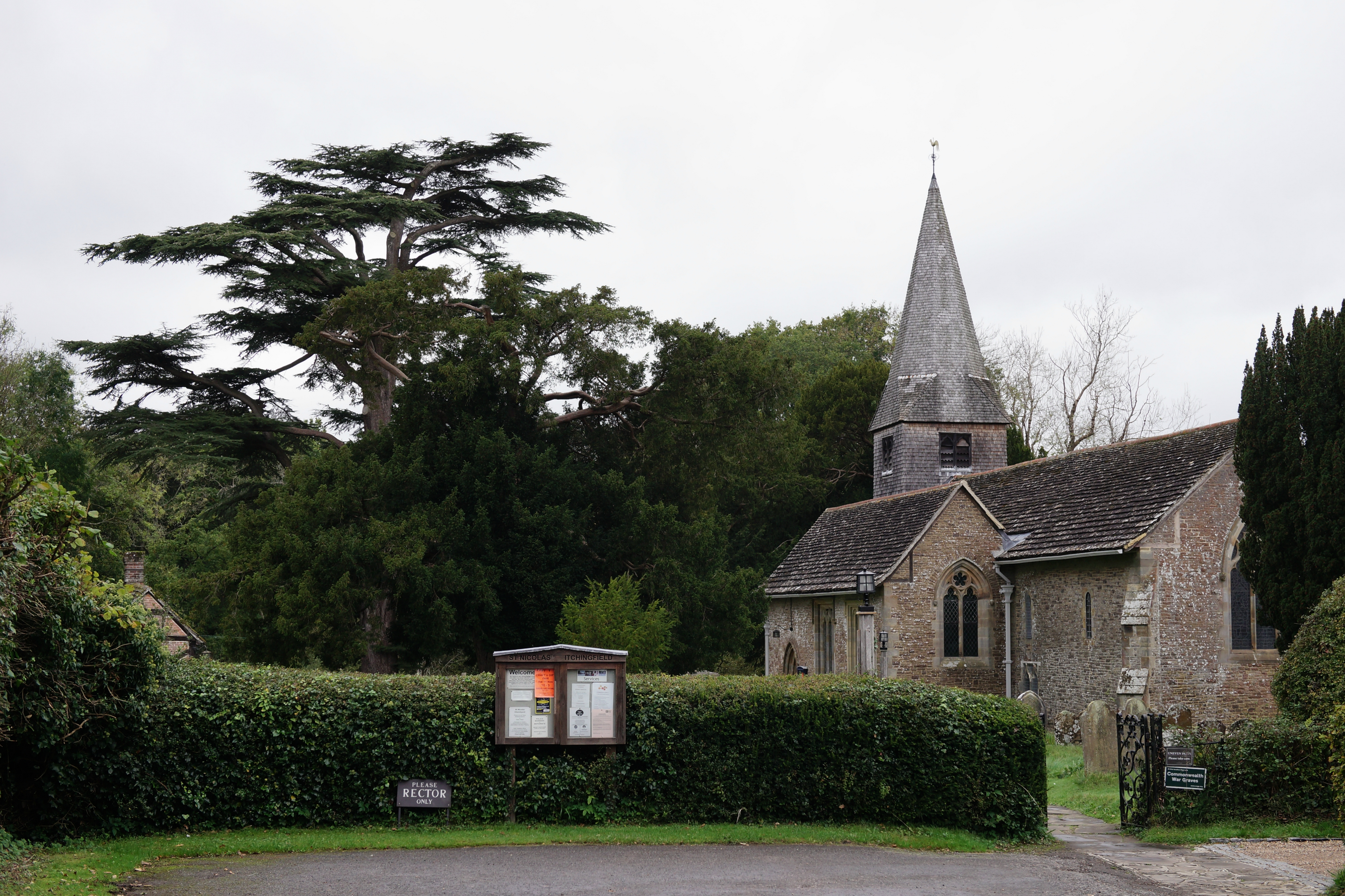
St. Nicolas 2017

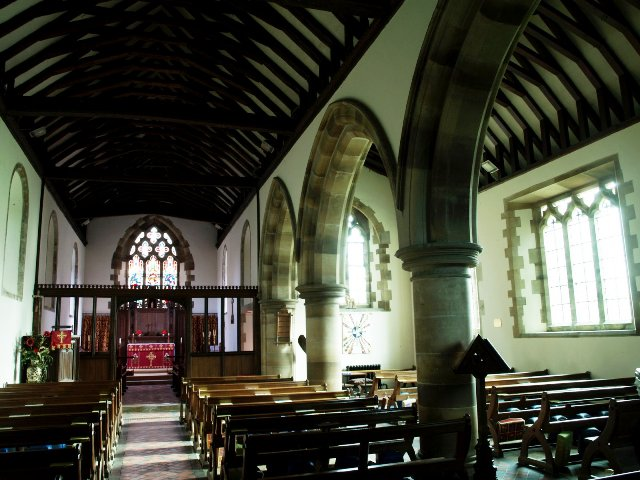
St. Nicolas Church insides

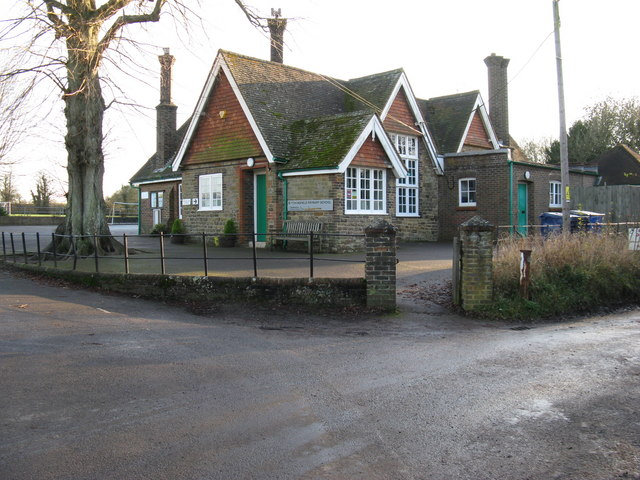
Itchingfield School
