= Barns Green =

Village in West Sussex, England

Coordinates: 51.03264°N 0.39408°W

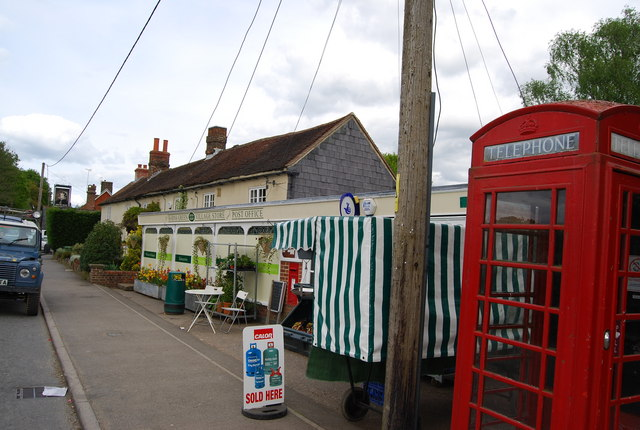

- Location within West Sussex
- OS grid reference: TQ127271
- Civil parish: Itchingfield
- District: Horsham
- Shire county: West Sussex
- Region: South East
- Country: England
- Sovereign state: United Kingdom
- Post town: HORSHAM
- Postcode district: RH13
- Dialling code: 01403
- Police: Sussex
- Fire: West Sussex
- Ambulance: South East Coast
- UK Parliament: Horsham

Barns Green is a village in the Horsham district of West Sussex, England. It lies on the Billingshurst to Itchingfield road 2 1/2 miles (4.0 km) north of Billingshurst. The village falls within the parish of Itchingfield and is surrounded by smaller communities of Brooks Green, Dragons Green and Bashurst Hill.

Barns Green is a rural community, with a village shop and post office, pub, primary school, sports club, campsite, cafe, fishery, village hall, riding school and village green. It has a number of locally based community clubs including toddler group, youth club, brownies, amateur dramatics, book club, and several sports clubs.

== Sports ==
Sports play a large part in this small village, in fact far more sports are offered than most villages of similar or larger sides. The Barns Green Rugby Club plays in the Harvey's Brewery Counties 3 Sussex league, whilst Barns Green Football Club plays in the West Sussex Football League and recently won the Premiership title for 2022/23 season. Other sports include a very active Cricket Club from U9's through to Adults as well as women's team. The tennis club situated at the side of the village green has two recently resurfaced courts with a thriving adult and junior membership. There is also a tag-rugby team which meets throughout the year and the highlight of the year is the Si Viney Tag Tournament which raises funds for the Wooden Spoon Charity and MDNA and has raised £65,000 to date.

Run Barns Green is the largest sporting event of the year with a Half Marathon, 10k, 5k and children's colour run which is run on the last Sunday of September and has been running for over 40 years with an average of 2000 runners which supports local associations and St Catherine's Hospice.

== Eating & Drinking ==
The Village has a pub, Sports & Social club and cafe at Sumners Ponds.

- Queens Head Pub- 17th century Queens Head has four fireplaces including a large inglenook where rumour says that smugglers used to hide their contraband (there is a road nearby called Smugglers Way). There is an attractive garden, with flower covered pergola, at the back of the pub. Beers are from local Sussex breweries. The pub aims to build the community by providing a service that brings people together and an atmosphere that is a hub for local entertainment. The pub offers a wide and varied menu, as well as Curry Nights, live music and day time coffee mornings as well as the annual vintage car event.
- Barns Green Sports & Social Club - is a members club situated on the Village Green and is open 7 days a week with special opening ours during events being held on the Green. The Club also houses changing rooms for the sports teams and has pool tables and a well stocked bar. Events held at the club include bingo, dog racing night, discos, live bands and most recently painting classes.
- Cafe by the Lake - as the name implies this cafe is situated by one of the lakes at Sumners Ponds and is open for drinks, cakes, pastries, hot food and snacks throughout the week. Throughout the summer it is open in the evening for regular feature nights such as, fish & chips, wood-fired pizza and mouth watering Sumners-own burgers. The cafe is well known for its breakfasts with cyclist at the weekend. It also has a licensed bar with lagers, beer, cider, and local ales, as well as an extensive wine and spirit selection.
