= King's Mill, Shipley =

Windmill in West Sussex, England

Shipley Windmill
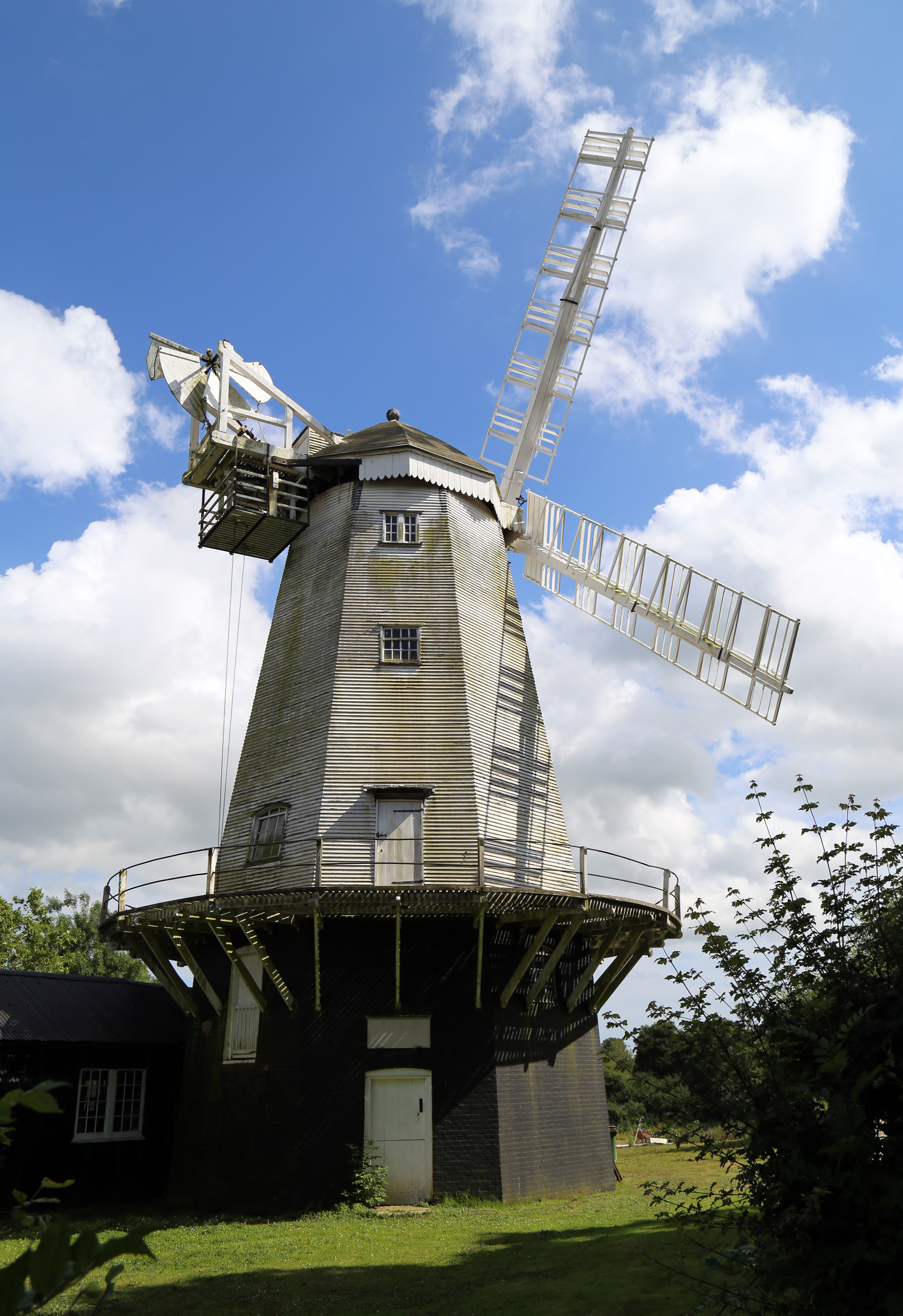
- King's Mill
- Interactive map of Shipley Windmill

Origin
- Mill name: King's Mill; Vincent's Mill
- Mill location: Shipley, West Sussex, England
- Grid reference: TQ 143 218
- Coordinates: 50.9848°N 0.3727°W
- Operator: Private
- Year built: 1879

Information
- Purpose: Corn mill
- Type: Smock mill
- Storeys: Four-storey smock
- Base storeys: Two-storey base
- Smock sides: Eight
- No. of sails: Four
- Type of sails: Patent sails
- Windshaft: Cast iron
- Winding: Fantail
- No. of pairs of millstones: 3
Listed Building – Grade II*
Official name	King's Windmill
Designated	22 September 1959
Reference no.	1180806

King's Mill or Vincent's Mill is a smock mill built in 1879 in Shipley, West Sussex, England.

== History ==
King's Mill was built in 1879 for Friend Martin at a cost of £2,500 by Messrs Grist and Steele, millwrights of Horsham. Machinery from an older windmill is believed to have been incorporated in the mill, at either Rumboldswhyke or Coldwaltham. Martin operated the windmill and the village shop until he died in 1884. The mill failed to sell so his wife hired Robert Miller as miller on her behalf. In 1895 it was sold to Richard Vincent who hired Ernest Powell as miller. The writer Hilaire Belloc bought the mill and the surrounding land in 1906. Powell continued to be miller while the mill worked commercially until 1926, latterly by a steam engine.

After the death of Belloc in 1953, King's Mill was restored by E. Hole and Sons, the Burgess Hill millwrights, as a memorial to the writer, and was re-opened to visitors for the first time in 1958. The mill was designated a Grade II* listed building in 1959. West Sussex County Council had responsibility for the upkeep of the mill which remained in the ownership of the Belloc family. A local committee the Friends of Shipley Windmill opened the mill to visitors until 1986. Major repairs to the mill were required and the County Council agreed with the owners to form a charitable trust to manage the mill.

The Shipley Windmill Charitable Trust was formed in 1987 and took over responsibility for the repairs and maintenance. Further restoration work was carried out by Hole's between 1987 and 1990, when the mill re-opened, although with only two sweeps at that time. The second pair of sweeps was fitted in 1991. A new stock was fitted in November 2004.

On 7 April 2009, it was announced that the mill was to close to the public as the lease owned by Shipley Mill Charitable Trust only had three years to run and the building needed £80,000 worth of repairs. The mill opened for the 2009 season on 5 April and held its last open day on 19 July. The owners fitted two new pairs of sweeps and a further new stock on 21 June 2013. In 2021 a planning application to convert the engine house to residential use was rejected by Horsham District Council.

== Description ==
King's Mill is a four-storey smock mill on a two-storey brick base. It has four patent sails carried on a cast-iron windshaft. The octagonal conical cap is winded by a fantail. The brake wheel is wood, driving a cast-iron wallower on an oak upright shaft. This carries a cast-iron great spur wheel which drives three pairs of overdrift millstones.

== Millers ==
- 1879–84 Friend Martin
- 1884–95 Robert Wood
- 1895–1926 Ernest Powell

== In popular culture ==
In the BBC television series Jonathan Creek, the mill was the filming location for Creek's home.

== See also ==
- Grade II* listed buildings in West Sussex
