= Red Dwarf: Titan =

2026 novel by Rob Grant and Andrew Marshall

Titan
- Cover art of novel
- Author: Rob Grant and Andrew Marshall
- Language: English
- Series: Red Dwarf
- Genre: Comic science fiction
- Publisher: Victor Gollancz Ltd
- Publication date: 16 July 2026
- Publication place: United Kingdom
- Media type: Print (Hardback)
- Pages: 400
- ISBN: 9781399636094

Red Dwarf: Titan is a 2026 science fiction comedy novel written by Rob Grant and Andrew Marshall, which serves as a prequel to the science fiction sitcom Red Dwarf. Titan deviates from the plot of the series and explores the characters of Dave Lister and Arnold Rimmer before the events of the first episode "The End" (1988), where they receive a message from the future forewarning them of events yet to occur.

Grant, creator of Red Dwarf along with Doug Naylor, had previously left the franchise following the Series VI finale "Out of Time" (1993). His last major writing contribution to the series prior to Titan was the 1996 novel Backwards, which served as a sequel to 1990's Better Than Life, which Grant co-wrote with Naylor. A legal dispute regarding the rights to Red Dwarf was settled in 2023 when Grant and Naylor agreed to a deal where they would be able to "launch separate iterations of Red Dwarf across various media".

On 25 February 2026, Grant died suddenly aged 70, prior to the release of Titan on 16 July of the same year.

== Plot ==
David Lister and Arnold Rimmer visit the Saturnian moon of Titan on shore leave. Lister's former girlfriend Kristine Kochanski is also visiting Titan, for a hen do ahead of her marriage to on-and-off again partner, Eric. Rimmer and Lister end up being assigned to mind each other on their shore leave, which takes place in the downmarket "Downtown" district. Lister plans to find an animal that he could use to violate Red Dwarf's quarantine regulations, for which the punishment would be a stay in suspended animation (stasis) and return to Earth, which he wishes to get back to. Rimmer seeks an advantage in his astronavigation exam.

== Development ==
Rob Grant created Red Dwarf alongside writing partner Doug Naylor, which first aired in 1988 for BBC2. The two worked together on the series, and founded a production company, Grant Naylor Productions. In 1993 Grant left Red Dwarf and the writing partnership, citing "musical differences" as the reason for their split, and after writing the novel Backwards, chose to pursue other creative ventures out of a desire to "be remembered for more than just that programme", whereas Naylor continued with Red Dwarf.

A long-running legal dispute between Grant and Naylor over the rights to the series was resolved in 2023, when a settlement gave permission for the two to "launch separate iterations of Red Dwarf across various media". Later that year, Grant announced plans to develop a prequel novel, to be co-written with Andrew Marshall, and television series, with plans to recast the main four leads with younger actors. Grant had previously worked with Marshall on Quanderhorn, another comedic science fiction series, for BBC Radio 4.

Red Dwarf: Titan was officially unveiled in February 2026, with the book's cover revealed and preorders made available that same month, with a release scheduled later that year on 16 July. As provided in a brief synopsis, Titan takes place prior to "The End" (1988) and involves the series' eponymous ship "in orbit around Titan, [with] the crew heading down for shore leave…However, their objectives are scuppered somewhat unexpectedly when they receive a cryptic message. A message from the future. Two feuding crewmen are catapulted into a breakneck race to save not only this but every other Reality." Victor Gollancz Ltd, an imprint of Orion Publishing Group, acquired the rights to publish Titan after having previously published the novelisation to Quanderhorn.

That same month, on 25 February, Grant unexpectedly died at the age of 70. The release of Titan was not impacted by this, however, and co-writer Marshall continued to give promotional interviews ahead of it, further describing the plot and the writing process that took place during its development. Chris Barrie, the actor who plays Arnold Rimmer in the television series, was announced as the narrator for Titan's audiobook on 16 June. Barrie had previously narrated the audiobooks for prior Red Dwarf novels Infinity Welcomes Careful Drivers and Better Than Life.

== Reception ==
Richard Edwards of SFX gave it four out of five stars, saying that "the interweaving character arcs offer plenty of opportunities for supporting characters like Kristine Kochanski and Captain Hollister to spread their wings, but this still unmistakably Red Dwarf", concluding "for [fans], this should be the next best thing to silicon heaven".

In a four-out-of-five star review, Starburst magazine's Beth McMillan wrote that "the sheer volume of different ideas and perspectives incorporated in the novel does mean it can occasionally become convoluted, particularly for readers less familiar with the franchise," but surmised "underneath the dimension-hopping cosmic chaos, Titan gets to the heart of what makes Red Dwarf tick; it’s a story about flawed people muddling through impossible situations with very little competence, but plenty of determination!"

Laurence Boyce of SciFiNow also gave it four stars out of five, stating that "the relentless pace and structure that flit between characters threaten to become overwhelming", but declaring that it "remains a wonderful addition to Dwarf lore and throws up many intriguing ideas of what the future may be."

== See also ==
- Red Dwarf: Infinity Welcomes Careful Drivers (1989)
- Better Than Life (1990)
- Last Human (1995)
- Backwards (1996)
