= Dad (TV series) =

- Genre: Comedy
- Written by: Andrew Marshall
- Directed by: Angela De Chastelai Smith; Marcus Mortimer; Nick Wood
- Starring: George Cole; Kevin McNally; Julia Hills; Toby Ross-Bryant
- Country of origin: United Kingdom
- Original language: English
- No. of series: 2
- No. of episodes: 13

Production
- Producers: Marcus Mortimer; Rosemary McGowan
- Running time: 30 minutes

Original release
- Network: BBC1
- Release: 25 September 1997 – 21 December 1999

Dad is a BBC1 sitcom that ran for 13 episodes (each 30 minutes long) over two series and a Christmas special. Described by the BBC as a 'generation-gap comedy', it centered on the trials and tribulations of Alan Hook (Kevin McNally) and his father Brian (George Cole). Alan would often find himself getting increasingly frustrated with the endeavours of his father, whilst the world seemed to be forever against him.

Toby Ross-Bryant played Alan's son Vincent, and Julia Hills played Alan's wife Beryl. It was written by Andrew Marshall, who was best known for his popular sitcom, 2point4 Children. The title of each episode was a pun on the word "Dad".

The theme tune for the first series was the 1965 hit 'Tijuana Taxi' performed by Herb Alpert & the Tijuana Brass. For the second series, this was replaced with the song 'Go Daddy-O' by California swing revival band, Big Bad Voodoo Daddy.

== Cast ==
- Kevin McNally as Alan Hook
- George Cole as Brian Hook
- Toby Ross-Bryant as Vincent Hook
- Julia Hills as Beryl Hook

== Plot ==
Alan Hook is a highly-strung and often unfortunate individual, constantly getting frustrated with the endeavours of his father Brian, and forever projecting his anger at the world around him. His long-suffering wife Beryl tries her best to keep her husband calm, though this proves difficult due to Brian, who, without meaning to, is always getting on his son's nerves with his over engineered ideas, and old fashioned ways. Alan's son Vincent is a moody teenager who is always embarrassed of Alan's actions.

=== Series overview ===
Series	Episodes	Originally released	
Series	Episodes	First released	Last released
1	6	25 September 1997	30 October 1997
2	6	11 January 1999	15 February 1999
Special	1	21 December 1999	

=== Series 1 (1997) ===
The theme tune for the first series was the 1965 hit "Tijuana Taxi" performed by Herb Alpert & the Tijuana Brass. The first episode was shot as part of a handful of pilots for various shows, and was then one of the few chosen to be made into a full series. Alan's house in series one differs to that in series two; the director wanted a bigger set for the kitchen, to fit more cameras in, hence the house move.

No. overall	No. in series	Title	Original release date
1	1	"Dadism"	25 September 1997
Brian gets sick which brings Alan to spend more time with his father
2	2	"Dadmestic"	2 October 1997
Alan goes to stay at Brian's house whilst Vincent has a house party.
3	3	"Dadcipline"	9 October 1997
Vincent's got a girlfriend. Unfortunately, her father lived next-door to Alan when he was younger – and Brian's actions 30 years ago are coming back to haunt him.
4	4	"Habadadery"	16 October 1997
Alan takes the family out for an expensive meal.
5	5	"Dadcoholic"	23 October 1997
Alan is concerned his father has been drink driving.
6	6	"Holidad"	30 October 1997
Alan plans to take the family on holiday

=== Series 2 (1999) ===
For the second series the theme song was 'Go Daddy-O' by Californian swing revival band Big Bad Voodoo Daddy. Series Two also comprised six episodes and was first aired from 11 January to 15 February 1999, but this time on Mondays at 8.30 pm. The episodes were entitled (in order of their airing):

No. overall	No. in series	Title	Original release date
7	1	"Transcendadtal"	11 January 1999
Alan and family move house, and since his dad's health problems brought Alan closer to him, Alan's nerves have become particularly bad.
8	2	"Dadmocracy"	18 January 1999
Alan and Vincent help Brian work at a polling station following a flu epidemic.
9	3	"Reprodadtion"	25 January 1999
Everyone seems to be enjoying a healthy sex life except for Alan, much to Beryl's annoyance.
10	4	"Securidad"	1 February 1999
Alan and Brian become security guards to protect a model village from thugs.
11	5	"Dad's Arsenal"	8 February 1999
Alan panics when finding out Brian has a collection of guns.
12	6	"Dad Calm"	15 February 1999
Alan worries when Brian goes to hospital for a heart bypass operation.

=== Christmas Special (1999) ===
The final episode was a Christmas special that aired on 21 December 1999, this time a Tuesday, at 8.30 pm. It broke with the tradition of punning on 'Dad' for the title, and was named 'Nemesis', although Andrew Marshall later revealed that the original title "Feliz Navidad" was nixed by the BBC, feeling it too obscure.

No.	Title	Original release date
13	"Nemesis"	21 December 1999
Alan's wealthy, good-looking, childhood-friend Barry pays a Christmas visit.

== Reception ==
The show was less critically acclaimed than Marshall's earlier BBC sitcom 2point4 Children.

== Cancellation ==
During the second series, writer Andrew Marshall was convinced the show would go to a third series. Kevin McNally also believed they would be doing the show for quite a while. However, after 13 episodes, Dad ended with a 1999 Christmas special. McNally commented that the show got "somehow lost", and attributed its cancellation to a regime change at the BBC. George Cole believed the show's cancellation was down to focus groups that had begun to influence decisions about which television programmes should be axed.

== Home release ==
Both series of Dad were released on DVD in Australia, with Madman Entertainment issuing Dad – The Complete First Series in 2011 and Series 2 later that year. The series has subsequently been repeated on U&Gold in the UK.

The show is streamed via tubi.

== Trivia ==
The estate agent named on the 'for sale' signs in the first episode of series 2 are called 'Renwick'; a nod to Andrew Marshall's ex-writing partner, David Renwick.
