= List of 2point4 Children characters =

Below is a list of characters, along with descriptions, from the BBC sitcom 2point4 Children. The show aired on BBC1 between 1991 and 1999.

== Main cast ==
=== Bill Porter ===
Wilhelmina "Bill" Porter (Belinda Lang) is wife to Ben and mother to Jenny and David. She takes a no-nonsense, forthright attitude to life and is unafraid to speak up for herself and her family. She is usually both the practical one in the family and the main disciplinarian towards her children. Although frequently frustrated by Ben's over-relaxed attitude, Bill's marriage is generally happy, and she is very protective of her children. During series 1 she and best friend Rona work at a bakery, but they resign due to sexual harassment from their boss. From series 2 onwards she runs a catering company with Rona.

=== Ben Porter ===
Ben Porter (Gary Olsen) is the father of the Porter family. He is a self-employed plumber and heating repair man, sometimes assisted by Christine. He is laid-back with a childish sense of humour that gets on Bill's nerves, but that David shares and enjoys. His relaxed attitude means the children see him as a soft touch compared to Bill. Ben, along with David, is a Tottenham Hotspur supporter. Although usually happy go lucky, his extended family is a touchy subject, with his mother having walked out when he was young and his father drifting in and out of his life.

=== Jenny Porter ===
Jenny Porter (Georgina Cates (Series 1-2) then Clare Buckfield (Series 3-8)) is the daughter of the Porter family; 14 at the start of the show, and around 19 by the end. She has typical teenage girl interests such as boys, fashion and music, but occasionally expresses oddly dark thoughts and sentiments. Halfway through the first series, Jenny becomes a vegetarian. She later gets a steady boyfriend, Jason, with the relationship hampered by Bill's over-protective nature. In the last series Jenny leaves for university and appears less frequently.

=== David Porter ===
David Porter (John Pickard) is the son of the Porter family; 11 at the start of the show, and around 16 by the end. His interests include horror movies, aliens and heavy metal, and generally anything disgusting (slime, dead rodents etc.). He frequently annoys his older sister, Jenny, but at times they bond over their parents' eccentric behaviour. Later in the show's run David gets a regular girlfriend, Maxine, who is a goth.

=== Rona Harris ===
Rona Harris (Julia Hills) is Bill's neighbour and best friend. She is single, childless and unashamedly promiscuous, acting as a direct contrast to Bill's more conventional family set-up. In series 1 she works with Bill at a bakery until they both resign due to sexual harassment, before later starting a catering company. In series 2 she reconnects with her ex-fiancé Gordon, whom she jilted at the altar at 17, and agrees to marry him - before jilting him for a second time. Rona later decides she wants a baby more than a man, and picks DJ Tony as a potential father, but later falls for him for real. When they struggle to have children, they consider adoption, before Rona announces she is pregnant in the final episode.

=== Christine Atkins ===
Christine (Kim Benson) is Ben's sarcastic and moody plumbing assistant. In the first series she works on the meat counter in a supermarket, before becoming Ben's plumbing assistant in the second series. Despite her stroppy attitude, Christine occasionally shows a genuine fondness for Ben and the Porter family.

== Recurring characters ==
=== Jake Klinger ===
Jake Klinger (Roger Lloyd-Pack) is a fellow plumber and rival of Ben, with the two frequently playing pranks on one another. He is nicknamed "The Klingon" due to his love of Star Trek.

=== Bette ===
Bill's opinionated, chain-smoking widowed mother, who lives in Suffolk. She is played by (Liz Smith). Bette frequently uses passive aggression to make Bill feel guilty about not visiting more often. She and Bill have a complex, yet ultimately loving, relationship.

=== Aunt Belle ===
Bette's twin sister and Bill's aunt. (Liz Smith)

=== Aunt Pearl ===
Rona's closest relative following the death of her mother when she was a teenager. She frequently shares odd stories about distant relatives and acquaintances, peppered with bizarre non-sequiturs. When Rona has to search for her birth certificate to retain her council house tenancy, Pearl confesses that she is actually her biological mother. (Barbara Lott)

=== Aunt Tina ===
Ben's older sister, played by (Patricia Brake in series 1 and Sandra Dickinson) thereafter. Having married a wealthy man, Tina has become something of a snobbish, "Stepford wife" figure, ashamed of her working-class roots. Tina's desire to be the perfect wife and traditional homemaker contrasts sharply with Bill's more chaotic household management and forthright attitude, and they have a fractious relationship at times. However, when she suspects husband Brian is having an affair, it is Bill that Tina chooses to confide in, admitting she wished she had her spirit. Tina has a son, Shane, who appears in series 1, but seemingly disappears afterwards.

=== Declan ===
Declan (Mitchell Ray) meets the Porters in series 7's last episode after he and a group of other children break into Ben's van when he and Bill drop Jenny off at university. After learning he is homeless, Bill and Ben sympathise with him. In series 8 he is portrayed by Alex Kew, and is fostered by the Porters and moves in with them. Declan's introduction was intended to prolong the series, but Gary Olsen's illness and subsequent death prevented this.
