= Assaulted Nuts =

Assaulted Nuts may refer to:

- Assaulted Nuts (TV series), British-American sketch comedy show
- "Assaulted Nuts" (The King of Queens), episode of the American sitcom
