= Assaulted Nuts (TV series) =

- Genre: Sketch Comedy
- Written by: Ray Cameron; Barry Cryer; Andrew Marshall; David Renwick; Terry Ravenscroft; Peter Vincent
- Directed by: Ray Cameron
- Starring: Elaine Hausman; William Sadler; Wayne Knight; Tim Brooke-Taylor; Daniel Peacock; Cleo Rocos; Emma Thompson; Gail Matthius
- Original language: English
- No. of seasons: 2
- No. of episodes: 13

Production
- Producer: Ray Cameron
- Running time: 30 minutes

Original release
- Network: Cinemax / Channel 4
- Release: April 17 (US) – November 17, 1984 (US)

Assaulted Nuts was a television sketch comedy series broadcast in the US in 1984 and the UK in 1985. The show was constructed as a fast-paced succession of short, unconnected sketches. It was a co-production between Cinemax in the US and Channel 4 in the UK. It ran for seven episodes in the UK and thirteen in the US and elsewhere.

American performers Elaine Hausman, William Sadler and Wayne Knight acted alongside British comic actors Cleo Rocos, Tim Brooke-Taylor, Daniel Peacock and Barry Cryer. New York actress Marcell Rosenblatt also appeared in episode 7, which may have been shot as the pilot.

In the second season (episodes 8-13), Emma Thompson and Gail Matthius replaced Brooke-Taylor and Hausman.

In keeping with Cinemax's reputation at the time, much of the material was sex-related, with overt references to Benny Hill, and Cleo Rocos' work with Kenny Everett.

In the UK, the show was broadcast at 11:15pm on Thursdays and consequently was seen by relatively few people, and thus made little impact, with critics dismissing it as Americanised. Seven 30-minute episodes were broadcast before the show was cancelled. (The second series was mentioned but not broadcast in the UK.) The original UK broadcasts were weekly between 17 January and 28 February 1985.

The writers of Assaulted Nuts were Ray Cameron, Barry Cryer, Andrew Marshall, David Renwick, Terry Ravenscroft, Peter Vincent. Ray Cameron also produced and directed the series.

American TV Guide listings for the Cinemax airings in 1984 listed one sketch from each episode.

- April 17 #1 Instant Cremation
- April 29 #2 Harry Sneak superspy
- May 15 #3 Hard-sell low budget commercials
- May 29 #4 Cavemen create wheel
- June 12 #5 President
- June 24 #6 Accountants Anonymous
- July 24 #7 Book buyer wears wrong underwear
- September 8 #8 Talk show gives bad advice
- September 22 #9 Cop has portable hydrant
- October 6 #10 Bank heist
- October 20 #11 Drunken pilot
- November 3 #12 Organic mafia
- November 17 #13 Murder mystery on train

The series aired on the arte channel in Germany from October 1993. (It also appears to have aired in France and Finland.) It aired on the USA Network in 1987, where a ten-minute clip also aired on USA's Night Flight music video series. In Australia, some sketches were shown as part of "Graham Kennedy's World of Comedy" (seven hourlong specials in 1986, with repeats in 1991 and 1992).

Tim Brooke-Taylor, speaking in 1997, said: "It was an American cable company who set it up at HBO. It was difficult, as everything had to fit American taste and knowledge. And the fact that we had no audience, which is vital for me. It could have been very good. I did a lot of sketches by David Renwick and Andrew Marshall (who wrote One Foot in the Grave and 2.4 Children), but they always seemed to be edited out. I couldn't do the second series and was replaced by Emma Thompson (natch), but that series was never shown in England. We got on very well with the American performers though. One of them incidentally was the interrogator of Sharon Stone in the 'Is she wearing them or not'. The name of the film escapes me. I replaced Olivia Newton-John in a Cliff Richard 'made for TV' film. So everything is equal. And does this explain why I play the women's parts? No."

In 2013, Wayne Knight commented: "It was an interesting thing, partly because Emma Thompson was in it. This was before she became Dame Emma. We’re still friends, because I just think when you find somebody like that you try not to let them go. It was three British actors and three Americans and it was airing simultaneously on Cinemax and Channel 4 in Britain. It sunk in the middle of the ocean, because you’re trying to combine British and American sensibilities. I don’t know if it worked, but it was fun to do. The British are very silly, and they’re very clever. They enjoy wordplay. Americans are broader and more coarse. We don’t like to belabor things. Like, shop sketches don’t necessarily play as well to us as they do the Brits. You know, the classic Monty Python, coming into a shop and having an odd conversation about a duck. That would play really well in Britain, and not well in Beaufort, Alabama."

In one sketch, William Sadler played Death, a role he would reprise in the Bill & Ted series of films. "I actually played the Grim Reaper once before Bogus Journey. It was on a TV show called Assaulted Nuts. There was this one scene where I was the Grim Reaper coming to take Elaine Hausman. And I started doing this accent that I’d heard from an actor who I’d worked with onstage named Jan Tříska. That’s how I know it’s a Czechoslovakian accent: because he was Czechoslovakian, and I just lifted it directly from him. We did a play together called New Jerusalem at the Public Theater, and I just thought, “Yeah, that’s what Death should sound like: vaguely European and kinda silly.”
