= Health and Efficiency (TV series) =

- Genre: Sitcom
- Written by: Andrew Marshall
- Directed by: Richard Boden
- Starring: Gary Olsen; Felicity Montagu; Roger Lloyd-Pack; Deborah Norton; Victor McGuire; Adjoa Andoh; Jennifer Gibson
- Country of origin: United Kingdom
- Original language: English
- No. of series: 2
- No. of episodes: 12

Production
- Producer: Richard Boden
- Running time: 30 minutes
- Production company: BBC

Original release
- Network: BBC1
- Release: 30 December 1993 – 10 February 1995

Related
- 2point4 Children

Health and Efficiency is a British sitcom that was originally broadcast from 30 December 1993 to 10 February 1995 on BBC1 for a total of 12 episodes over two series. It was written by Andrew Marshall, writer of the sitcom 2point4 Children.

The show stars Gary Olsen and Roger Lloyd-Pack, who both starred in 2point4 Children, as well as Victor McGuire and Deborah Norton.

The setting is a hospital and each episode is 30 minutes in length.

== Cast ==
- Gary Olsen as Dr. Michael Jimson
- Felicity Montagu as Dr. Kate Russell
- Roger Lloyd-Pack as Reg Rexis
- Deborah Norton as Diana Ewerts
- Victor McGuire as Dr. Phil Brooke
- Adjoa Andoh as Sister Beth Williams
- Jennifer Gibson as Nurse Mandy

== Episodes ==
=== Series 1 (1993–94) ===
No.	Title	Original release date
1	"But He Never Said He Loved Me"	30 December 1993
2	"Brideshead Revisited"	6 January 1994
3	"Cinderella Rockafella"	13 January 1994
4	"The Green Eye of the Little Yellow God"	20 January 1994
5	"The Canvas"	27 January 1994
6	"Beware of Young Girls of Five and Twenty"	3 February 1994

=== Series 2 (1995) ===
No. overall	No. in series	Title	Original release date
7	1	"Doctor Death"	6 January 1995
8	2	"Not Tested on Rabbits"	13 January 1995
9	3	"You Bet Your Life"	20 January 1995
10	4	"The Old Dope Peddler"	27 January 1995
11	5	"Five Have Plenty of Fun"	3 February 1995
12	6	"Finders Keepers"	10 February 1995
