= The Next Programme Follows Almost Immediately =

The Next Programme Follows Almost Immediately (TNPFAI) is a BBC comedy of the 1970s.

The programme starred Bill Wallis, David Jason, Denise Coffey, David Gooderson and Jonathan Cecil. The basic story revolved around a comedy factory, Allied British Comedy, with manager CMD (Wallis) and secretary/announcer Iris (Coffey).

It was originally broadcast on BBC Radio 4 in the late night Friday slot, as a summer replacement for Week Ending. Lines From My Grandfather's Forehead occupied the slot as well. A running joke was that Cecil, an actor with a very distinctive voice, played many character parts, all the same apart from a slight twang, which the actors in the programme would discuss before the story resumed. Cecil often dropped the accents, Welsh, American and so on, after a few lines. Jason and Gooderson played most of the voice parts, and Jason had a recurring role as Charlie, the sound effects man.

The series was not a success and was dropped, after thirteen episodes being recorded, as too difficult, surreal and "clever." Most editions are now thought lost though parts of one were broadcast on BBC 7, picked by BBC producer David Hatch as one of his favourite programmes.

The scripts were by Chris Langham, Peter Spence and David Renwick and most episodes were produced by Simon Brett. The piano was played by Peter Pontzen, who has also written musical plays for children.

The audience frequently had lines and, in one episode, the entire factory and audience went on a day trip to Gravel Hall, a stately home in England.
