= Victor McGuire =

English actor (born 1964)

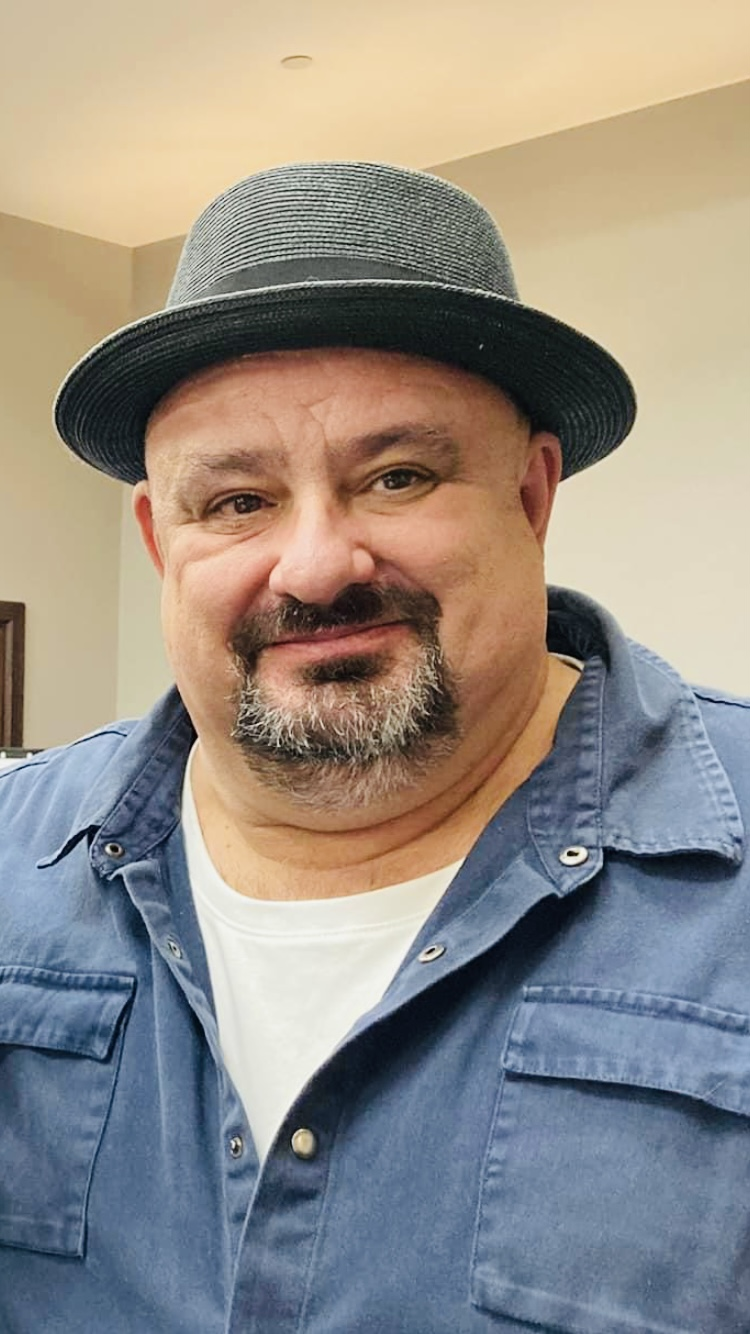
- Victor McGuire in 2023
- Born: 17 March 1964 (age 62); Tuebrook, Liverpool, England
- Occupation: Actor
- Years active: 1983–present

Victor McGuire (born 17 March 1964) is an English actor best known for playing Jack Boswell in series 1–3 and 5–7 of Carla Lane's Bread, Ron Wheatcroft in every series of Goodnight Sweetheart and its 2016 one-off episode, and Sean Hughes's neighbour Tony in Sean's Show ("the kind of guy you can ask to build you a shed").

== Life and career ==
McGuire appeared as Gary, one of the pair of thieves in Guy Ritchie's Lock, Stock and Two Smoking Barrels, and as Deputy Chief Constable Nadin in Mike Leigh's Peterloo.

He has also appeared in a number of TV programmes, including Dalziel and Pascoe, Casualty and 2point4 Children. He played the character of Amos Hart in the West End musical Chicago and was Lazar Wolf in the West End production of Fiddler on the Roof at the Savoy Theatre. He later reprised the role of Amos Hart in the theatrical production of Chicago, in the Cambridge Theatre, London. In 2012 he appeared in two episodes of historical drama World Without End as peasant Mark Webber. In 2005 he appeared in "A Fresh Start" and "Miller's Tale" - the first and the third episodes of the fifteenth series of Heartbeat as Brian Parker.

From 2012 to 2017 he appeared as security guard Ian in the Sky1 sitcom Trollied. His last appearance was in the Christmas special episode in December 2017.

In February 2019 McGuire appeared in Coronation Street as a character called Big Garth. In May 2019 McGuire played Garanin in the Sky / HBO Mini-Series Chernobyl.

In 2020 he appeared as a policeman in an advertisement for Haribo Starmix. McGuire is a supporter of Everton F.C. In 2020 he starred in ITV sitcom Kate & Koji as a customer named Mr. Mulholland, a pessimistic hypochondriac. In March 2021 he appeared in a safety advertisement for Highways England having the song "Go Left" a parody version of Go West by The Pet Shop Boys sung to him by two flies on his windscreen.

In 2022, he reprised his role as Mr. Mulholland in series two of Kate & Koji.

== Filmography ==
=== Film ===
Year	Title	Role	Notes
1995	Sorry About Last Night	Michael	
1998	Lock, Stock and Two Smoking Barrels	Gary	
2001	Redemption Road	Ronald	
2002	Thunderpants	Mr Smash	
2003	A Changed Man		
2004	Suzie Gold	Breakfast TV Editor	
2004	The Phantom of the Opera	Piangi	
2005	Hellraiser: Hellworld	Police Officer No. 1	
2006	The Black Dahlia	Sgt. Bill Koenig	
2007	Dangerous Parking	Harry	
2007	Midsummer Madness	Mike	
2011	The Task	Big Daddy	
2012	The Woman in Black	Gerald Hardy	
2013	Spike Island	Security Guard	
2015	Star Wars: The Force Awakens	Bar Patron	
2018	Peterloo	Deputy Chief Constable Nadin	
2019	The Personal History of David Copperfield	Creakle	

=== Television ===
Year	Title	Role	Notes
1983–1984	Brookside	Mike	
1986–1991	Bread	Jack Boswell	61 episodes
1992	2Point4 Children	Doctor Brooke	S2 E7
1992–1993	Sean's Show	Tony Benetti	
1993–1999, 2016	Goodnight Sweetheart	Ron Wheatcroft	
1993–1995	Health and Efficiency	Phil Brooke	
1998	The Bill	Jake Morgan	S14 "Bad Chemistry"
2000	A Many Splintered Thing	Luis Banks	Main
2001–2002	Peak Practice	Shaun Carter	
2001	Comic Relief: Say Pants to Poverty	Himself	
2002	Being April	Richard	Main
2007	New Tricks	Peter Baker	S4.E4 "Nine Lives"
2012–2017	Trollied	Ian	38 episodes
2014	Doctors	Steve Miles	
2015	The Last Kingdom	Oswald	
2019	Shakespeare & Hathaway: Private Investigators	Phil Sirkin	1 episode
2019	Doctors	Dave Weaver	1 episode
2019	Chernobyl	Garanin	1 episode
2019	Coronation Street	Big Garth	
2020–2022	Kate & Koji	Mr Mullholland	8 episodes
2022	The Responder	Trevor	
2023	A Small Light	Willem Grootendorst	TV Miniseries

=== Video games ===
Year	Title	Role	Notes
2015	Everybody's Gone to the Rapture	Charlie Tate	Voice role
