= Strange (TV series) =

- Strange title card
- Genre: Supernatural drama Horror; Thriller
- Created by: Andrew Marshall
- Starring: Richard Coyle; Samantha Womack; Ian Richardson; William Tomlin; Andrew-Lee Potts; Timmy Lang
- Composer: Dan Jones
- Country of origin: United Kingdom
- Original language: English
- No. of seasons: 1
- No. of episodes: 7

Production
- Executive producer: Andrew Marshall
- Producer: Marcus Mortimer
- Running time: 60 mins
- Production company: Big Bear Productions

Original release
- Network: BBC One
- Release: 9 March 2002
- Release: 31 May – 5 July 2003

Strange is a British television supernatural drama series, produced by the independent production company Big Bear Productions for the BBC, which aired on BBC One. It consists of a single one-hour pilot episode screened in March 2002, followed by a series of six one-hour episodes broadcast in the summer of 2003. The supernatural plot involved a defrocked priest's mission to destroy demons.

== Plot ==
The series follows former priest John Strange, dismissed from the clergy under mysterious circumstances. He was implicated in a number of gruesome murders, murders that he says were done by demons. Now he seeks those responsible and to clear his name. To help him in his hunt for demons, John has Toby, a technological expert who is in charge of the equipment John uses to sense the presence of demons, and Kevin. Kevin has Down's syndrome, which appears to enable him to sense the presence of demons and is often an early warning that something supernatural is about to happen in the area. Jude, a former scientist who works as a nurse, is interested because she found out that her partner Rich was a demon. With Rich dead, her main concern is that the son they had together, Joey, could also be a demon. John's mission is hampered by Canon Black, who is intent on denying the presence of dark forces.

== Setting ==
The demons in Strange include non-human and near human forms. Near human demons are distinguishable by their inhuman eye colouring which varies from blood red, silver or gold. These demons are capable of concealing their eye colour with a sort of nictitating membrane which makes the eyes appear human. They are capable of interbreeding with humans and many such demons have assimilated themselves into human society to cover their activities.

Non-human demons live on the fringes of society or hibernate in isolated areas. They reputedly have long lifespans, and can only be killed through special methods. When a demon dies its body will explode in a ball of flame.

== Cast ==
- Richard Coyle as John Strange
- Samantha Janus as Jude
- Ian Richardson as Canon Black
- Andrew-Lee Potts as Toby (Bryan Dick in the pilot)
- Timmy Lang as Kevin
- William Tomlin as Joey

== Production ==
All six episodes of the series were written by Andrew Marshall, a scriptwriter primarily known for his comedy work. It was directed by Joe Ahearne, who had previously been responsible for both writing and directing the World Productions vampire serial Ultraviolet for Channel 4.

The six episodes were shot on location and at Ealing Studios, and filming concluded on 23 December 2002. Filming was split into two blocks; the first (made up of episodes 1, 2 and 5) was directed by Aherne and the second by Simon Massey, who had previously worked on Ballykissangel. Marshall wrote the first regular episode as an introduction to the characters and the scenario, despite having already done so for the pilot. He attributed this to the BBC's policy of not repeating pilots; he had to introduce new viewers who may not have seen the pilot.

A second season was planned and Kevin was to have been found dead in the first episode.

== Episodes ==
| No. overall | No. in series | Title | Directed by | Written by | Original release date | Viewers (millions) |
|---|---|---|---|---|---|---|
| 0 | Pilot | "Azal" | Andrew Marshall | Joe Ahearne | 9 March 2002 | TBA |
Jude is a young woman working in a hospital and is happily living with her boyfriend Rich, a courier, and their son. After a priest turns up in her ward horribly charred during a thunder storm, Jude is given details on John Strange, a mysterious, distant man who may be able to solve the case. Strange introduces Jude to demons and tells her that a demon is walking amongst them in human form and that it is a demon responsible for the priest's death. Jude makes a horrifying discovery that her boyfriend, Rich, is the demon in question.
| 1 | 1 | "Zoxim" | Andrew Marshall | Joe Ahearne | 31 May 2003 | TBA |
Jude is concerned her son may have inherited his father's demonic talents and seeks out Strange's advice. Soon there are more pressing concerns when withered corpses are discovered. Has a new demon awoken in London?
| 2 | 2 | "Kaa-Jinn" | Andrew Marshall | Joe Ahearne | 7 June 2003 | TBA |
A missing priest and the killing of group of young boys start the next mystery for Strange. The race is on when these killing are discovered to have a greater and more sinister motive than they first thought.
| 3 | 3 | "Costa Burra" | Andrew Marshall | Simon Massey | 14 June 2003 | TBA |
The opening of an old tomb awakens a deadly and ancient evil. Strange and Jude must find and defeat the plague spreading demon and its master before a new deadly outbreak is unleashed.
| 4 | 4 | "Incubus" | Andrew Marshall | Simon Massey | 21 June 2003 | TBA |
When one of Strange's team is accused of murder, Strange must work to prove his innocence and find the true demonic culprit. Meanwhile Jude is about to fall into a deadly trap.
| 5 | 5 | "Dubik" | Andrew Marshall | Joe Ahearne | 28 June 2003 | TBA |
When Strange is given a job by Canon Black involving a demon he is naturally suspicious. Unfortunately the demon proves to be very real and forces Strange to re-live a horrible event from his past.
| 6 | 6 | "Asmoth" | Andrew Marshall | Simon Massey | 5 July 2003 | TBA |
With the discovery of gnawed human remains Strange must face the horrible reality that his demonic nemesis Asmoth has returned. But with Canon Black and even his own friends plotting against him can Strange hope to stop the unstoppable demon alone?

== Broadcast and reception ==
Broadcast on Saturday nights, the series was hampered by frequent timeslot changes, the long gap between the pilot and the series and the BBC's decision not to repeat the pilot before the series aired. The viewing figures were low, and a second series was not commissioned. However, to mark five years since the original broadcast, creator Andrew Marshall wrote an additional short story entitled 'Ramset.'

In the United States, Strange has been broadcast by the cable television network Showtime, on one of its specialist subsidiary channels and in July 2009 the series started airing on Chiller. The UK Sci-Fi Channel screened all seven episodes of Strange in both 2006 and 2007.
