= The Steam Video Company =

- Genre: Comedy
- Written by: Andrew Marshall; David Renwick
- Country of origin: United Kingdom
- Original language: English
- No. of series: 1
- No. of episodes: 6

Production
- Production company: Thames Television

Original release
- Network: ITV
- Release: 19 January – 23 February 1984

The Steam Video Company is a 1984 comedy series produced by Thames Television for ITV written by Andrew Marshall and David Renwick.

The six episode series was a low budget spoof of the horror genre, intermingled with spoofs on contemporary television programmes, such as Nationwide. The programmes starred the same repertory cast of comic actors in a variety of roles. The cast included: William Franklyn, Barry Cryer, Anna Dawson, Bob Todd, Madeline Smith and Jimmy Mulville. The title is thought to be a reference to 'the golden age of steam railways', with the 'steam video' apparently a spoof on the multitude of low-budget horror and exploitation films available during the early days of the British home video boom.

== Catchphrases and running jokes ==
William Franklyn responds to at least one double entendre in each episode by looking at the camera and muttering "tempting, isn't it?"

Each episode begins with glimpses of non-existent films as a way of introducing the cast members, such as "Gentlemen Prefer Ladies starring Anna Dawson and Madeline Smith", and closes with a spoof 'teaser' of next week's episode, such as the Loneliness of the Long Distance Garlic Eater.

Bob Todd is the only actor referred to by name in the episodes, usually by an exasperated cast member expressing dismay at his shoddy disguises.

== Episode list ==
1. "The Strange Case of Dr Jekyll"
2. "Creature From the Black Forest Gateau"
3. "I Was Hitler's Bookie"
4. "The Secret of Plankton Lodge"
5. "Amityville II – Luton Town 3"
6. "The Fall of The House of Franklyn"
