= Deborah Norton =

British actress

- Born: 1944 (age 81–82); Croydon, Surrey, England
- Occupation: Actress

Deborah Norton (born 1944) is an English actress.

== Personal life ==
Deborah Norton was born in Croydon, Surrey, in 1944. She attended a Quaker boarding school and later studied at the Drama Centre London. She worked in Britain until she toured America with The Beggar's Opera. She later returned to the UK.

== Career ==
=== Stage work ===
Norton has taken part in productions of Six Degrees of Separation, Thérèse Raquin, The School for Scandal, and others in locations as diverse as the Royal Court, Bristol Old Vic, the Nottingham Playhouse, the National Theatre and others.

Play	Playwright	Director	Theatre
The London Cuckolds	Edward Ravenscroft	Stuart Burge	Royal Court Theatre
Inadmissible Evidence	John Osborne	John Osborne	Royal Court Theatre
Six Degrees of Separation	John Guare	Phyllida Lloyd	Royal Court Theatre / Comedy Theatre
A Lie of the Mind	Sam Shepard	Simon Curtis	Royal Court Theatre
Innocent Bystanders	Gordon Graham	Denise Coffey	Royal Court Theatre
AC/DC	Heathcote Williams	Nicholas Wright	Royal Court Theatre
Red Cross	Sam Shepard		Royal Court Theatre
Backbone	Michael Rosen		Royal Court Theatre
The Enoch Show			Royal Court Theatre
Anarchist	Michael Almaz		Royal Court Theatre
The Dragon	Yevgeny Schwarz		Royal Court Theatre
The Black Prince	Iris Murdoch	Stuart Burge	Aldwych Theatre
A Little Hotel on the Side	Georges Feydeau (adapted by John Mortimer)	Jonathan Lynn	Royal National Theatre
On the Razzle	Johann Nestroy (adapted by Tom Stoppard)	Peter Wood	Royal National Theatre
Barnaby and the Old Boys	Keith Baxter	Toby Robertson	Clwyd Theatr Cymru / Vaudeville Theatre
Kennedy's Children	Robert Patrick (playwright)	Clive Donner	Arts Theatre
The Philanthropist	Christopher Hampton	Robert Kidd	May Fair Theatre
Agamemnon	Steven Berkoff	Steven Berkoff	Greenwich Theatre
The Ball Game	Tom Thomas	John Fortune	Open Space Theatre
Suicide in B Flat	Sam Shepard	Kenneth Chubb	Open Space Theatre
The Italian Straw Hat	Eugene Labiche and Marc-Michel	Ray Cooney	Shaftesbury Theatre
Waiting for the Parade	John Murrell	Richard Cottrell	Lyric Theatre (Hammersmith)
Children's Day	Keith Waterhouse & Willis Hall	Clive Perry	Mermaid Theatre
Chiaroscuro	Israel Horovitz		Institute of Contemporary Arts
The Electronic Nigger	Ed Bullins		
Dandy Dick	Arthur Wing Pinero	Sheila Hancock	Cambridge Arts Theatre
Schooldays	JB Stevenson	Jonathan Lynn	Cambridge Arts Theatre
What the Butler Saw	Joe Orton	Roger Michell	Cambridge Arts Theatre
Private Lives	Noël Coward	Gareth Morgan	Northern Stage, Newcastle upon Tyne
The School for Scandal	Richard Brinsley Sheridan	Phyllida Lloyd	Manchester Royal Exchange
Thérèse Raquin	Emile Zola	Pip Broughton	Nottingham Playhouse
Trees in the Wind	John McGrath		7:84 Company, Edinburgh Festival
Killing of Mr Toad	David Gooderson	David Gooderson	King's Head Theatre
The Lenny Bruce Show		Danny Brainin	King's Head Theatre
Cracks	Martin Sherman	Tim Luscombe	King's Head Theatre
Suicide in B Flat	Sam Shepard		Open Space Theatre
Just Between Ourselves	Alan Ayckbourn	Terry Johnson	Bristol Old Vic
Sixty Thousand Nights		Val May	Bristol Old Vic
Nightshade	Stewart Parker	Peter Farago	Birmingham Repertory Theatre / King's Head Theatre
California Dog Fight	Mark Lee	Simon Stokes	Bush Theatre
Look Back in Anger	John Osborne	Jonathan Hales	Phoenix Theatre
Live Like Pigs	John Arden	Jonathan Hales	
The Country Wife	William Wycherley	Jonathan Hales	Phoenix Theatre
A View From The Bridge	Arthur Miller		Northern Stage, Newcastle upon Tyne
Lock Up Your Daughters			Theatre Royal, Lincoln
The Governor's Lady	David Mercer		
What the Butler Saw	Joe Orton	Robert Delamere	Manchester Royal Exchange

=== Television ===
Norton has acted roles in many television productions, including Marta Dorf in the television miniseries Holocaust and roles in A Bit of Fry & Laurie.

She is perhaps best known for her role as the PM's advisor Dorothy Wainwright in Yes, Prime Minister.

== Selected filmography ==
- Holocaust (1978)
- Robbie (1979)
- The Wildcats of St Trinian's (1980)
- Play for Today (4 plays, 1976–1981)
- Lady Killers (1 episode, 1980)
- Home to Roost (1 episodes, 1986)
- Yes, Prime Minister (6 episodes, 1986–1988)
- A Bit of Fry & Laurie (3 episodes, 1989)
- Making Out (2 episodes, 1989)
- Health and Efficiency (12 Episodes 1993 – 1995)
- Chalk (1 Episode 1997)

== Awards and nominations ==
Nominated for Best Actress for her work on Kennedy's Children by Plays and Players Magazine

Nominated for Best Supporting Actress for School For Scandal by the Manchester Evening News
