= Julia Hills =

English actress (born 1957)

Julia Hills (born 3 April 1957) is an English actress, known for playing Rona in all eight series of the BBC sitcom 2point4 Children. She also played various roles in Channel 4's first late night satirical sketch show Who Dares Wins, Beryl in two series of the sitcom Dad and Caroline Joyner in Casualty.

== Early life and career ==
Hills was born in Nottingham. She graduated from the University of Bristol in 1978 with an Upper Second class degree in English and Drama. She is a former member of the Royal Shakespeare Company where she played many leading roles including Sally Forth in the premiere of Peter Nichols' musical Poppy. Perdita in The Winter's Tale and Diana in All's Well That Ends Well directed by Trevor Nunn. She also played Edwin Drood in the New York Shakespeare Theatre production of The Mystery of Edwin Drood at the Savoy Theatre in 1987 working with Lulu and Ernie Wise.

== Theatre work ==
Hills was nominated for an Olivier Award (Actress of the Year in a Musical) in 1984 for her performance as Emily Tallentire in Howard Goodall and Melvyn Bragg's musical The Hired Man.

Other theatre credits include Eve in Flying Under Bridges by Sandi Toksvig adapted by Sarah Daniels (Watford Palace Theatre), Betty in Larkin with Women (Coventry Belgrade), Vera in Stepping Out (New Vic Theatre Stoke), The Hired Man (Leicester Haymarket and West End), A Midsummer Night's Dream (RSC Stratford and Barbican) Rusty in Our Friends in the North by Peter Flannery (RSC Newcastle and Barbican), The Witch of Edmonton (RSC Stratford), Beside Herself by Sarah Daniels (Royal Court), We The Undersigned, Dealing With Clair by Martin Crimp (Orange Tree Richmond), Toine in Piaf, Beauty and the Beast, Guys and Dolls, The Tempest, Sylvia Raven in Shaw'sThe Philanderer, Beside The Sea, Susannah in Alan Ayckbourn's Bedroom Farce, A Mad World my Masters, Dorcas Frey in David Hare's Plenty (Bristol Old Vic), A Midsummer Night's Dream (Bristol Old Vic and London Old Vic), Brecht's Mr Puntila and his Man Matti, Does This Train Stop at Southend? (Stratford East), Bunty Mainwaring in Coward's The Vortex, Shore Saints and Sea Devils (Library Theatre Manchester), Fertility Dance (Nuffield Southampton), Jack and the Beanstalk (York Theatre Royal) and two national tours of Who Dares Wins – Sex and Drugs and Sausage Roll. From February 2009 she took part in a nationwide tour of Calendar Girls before it moved to the Noël Coward Theatre from 4 April 2009.

In recent years, she has appeared as Mrs Eynsford-Hill in Pygmalion at Manchester's Royal Exchange theatre and rejoined the tour of Calendar Girls to play the role of Annie. She played Amy Ruskin in Special Occasions at The Mill Theatre Sonning playing opposite her husband Paul Clarkson and then played Homily Clock in The Borrowers at The Nuffield Theatre Southampton. She completed sell out seasons at Shakespeare at the Tobacco Factory in Bristol garnering five star reviews for her performances as Goneril in King Lear and Madame Ranevskaya in The Cherry Orchard both directed by Andrew Hilton and then moved to the Everyman Theatre, Cheltenham where she performed in Tennessee Williams' The Glass Menagerie playing Amanda Wingfield. She has played the part of Kath in Entertaining Mr Sloane by Joe Orton at Curve Leicester and Toine in Piaf directed by Paul Kerryson. She has played Margaret in Springs Eternal by Susan Glaspell at The Orange Tree Theatre Richmond directed by Sam Walters and Worst Wedding Ever by Chris Chibnall at the Salisbury Playhouse. In 2019, she created the role of Dolly Bantry for the first-ever English stage adaptation of Agatha Christie's The Mirror Crack'd at the Salisbury Playhouse directed by Melly Still which subsequently toured in the UK and Ireland.

== Television work ==
Hills has appeared in many TV shows, such as in 2point4 Children in which she played Rona for the show's 8 series run on BBC1 (1991–1999). She also starred as all of the women and even some of the male characters in the Channel 4 comedy series Who Dares Wins (1984–1988). She has appeared as Caroline Joyner in hospital drama Casualty (2004–2005), and previously in the series as Carol Simpson for one 1993 episode.

She also starred in Ladies in Charge for 6 episodes in 1986 and shared a leading role with Kevin McNally in BBC sitcom Dad as Beryl Hook for 13 episodes (1997–1999) over 2 series. Dad was written by Andrew Marshall who also created 2point4 Children. She has also appeared as herself on The Good Sex Guide in 1993 and The Alan Titchmarsh Show in 2009.

Hills is also known for playing Annabelle Shrivener in The Archers as well as appearing in numerous other radio series and plays. Her films include Homeground (1982). In 2014, she appeared in the BBC soap opera Doctors in the recurring role of Hazel Conroy. She returned to the soap in February 2022, where she played Susan Rutherford for one episode.

== Selected filmography ==
=== Television ===
Year	Title	Role	Notes
1980	The Lost Tribe	Lala	2 episodes
1984	Goodbye Days	TBC	TV movie
1984	A Winter Harvest	Rita	2 episodes
1984 – 1988	Who Dares Wins	Various	22 episodes
1985	Storyboard	Babs Palmer	Episode: "Ladies in Charge"
1985	The Lenny Henry Show	Various	Episode #2.4
1986	Ladies in Charge	Babs Palmer	6 episodes
1987 – 1988	The Refuge	Julia	14 episodes
1988	The Bretts	Dulcie	Episode: "The Golden Dustman"
1990	Boon	Dr. Freda Butler	Episode: "Best Left Buried"
1991	The Upper Hand	Shirley Grant	Episode: "And the Winner Is..."
1991 – 1999	2point4 Children	Rona Harris	56 episodes
1992	Haggard	Bathsheba	Episode: "The Claimant"
1993	Casualty	Carol Simpson	
1997 – 1999	Dad	Beryl Hook	13 episodes
2000	Peak Practice	Kay	Episode: "Divided We Stand"
2002	Doctors	Cathy Beacham	Episode: "Afraid to Love"
2003	Murphy's Law	Katherine	Episode: "Manic Monday"
2003	Trevor's World of Sport	Kirsty	Episode #1.1
2003	Star	Mrs. Fisher	13 episodes
2004	Murder in Suburbia	Julia McKee	Episode: "A Good Deal of Attention"
2004	Wipe Out	Aunt Mary	TV movie
2004 – 2005	Casualty	Caroline Joyner	5 episodes
2006	All in the Game	June	TV movie
2008	Roman Mysteries	Viba	2 episodes
2010	Doctors	B.J. Markell	Episode: "Mystery at Moot Point"
2010	Outnumbered	Babs	Episode: "The Internet"
2012	Casualty	Cathy Preist	Episode: "My Aim is True"
2014	Law & Order UK	Hayley Ashburton	Episode: "Hard Stop"
2014	Doctors	Hazel Conroy	7 episodes
2016	Boomers	Pat	Episode: "Wedding"
2018	EastEnders	Morag Morgan	8 episodes
2022	Doctors	Susan Rutherford	Episode: "A Respectable Neighbourhood"
2022	The Emily Atack Show	Various	2 episodes

=== Radio ===
Year	Title	Role	Notes
1983	Our Man in Havana	Milly	3 episodes
1987 – 1988	Saturday Night Fry	Various	6 episodes
1992	Dealing With Clair	Liz	
1992	The Culper Tapes	Gwenda	
1996	Life Death and Sex with Sue and Mike	Sue	6 episodes
2000	Book at Bedtime	Narrator	
2001	The Rainbow Bridge	Kate	10 episodes
2002	Earth Song	TBC	
2002	The Lost Child	Rachel	
2003	It Started With a Click	Rachel	
2003	Gilbert Without Sullivan	Georgiana	1 episode
2004	Julie and the Prince	Julie	
2004	The Walsall Boys	Marie	
2006	Falco	Pollia	4 episodes
2006	Revolting People	Mary	6 episodes
2007 2025	The Archers	Annabelle Scriviner	75 episodes
