= End of Part One =

British television comedy sketch show

- Created by: David Renwick; Andrew Marshall
- Directed by: Geoffrey Sax
- Composer: Nigel Hess
- Country of origin: United Kingdom
- No. of series: 2
- No. of episodes: 14

Production
- Producers: Simon Brett (series 1); Humphrey Barclay (series 2)
- Running time: 30 minutes
- Production company: LWT

Original release
- Network: ITV
- Release: 15 April 1979 – 23 November 1980

End of Part One is a British television comedy sketch show written by David Renwick and Andrew Marshall; it was made by London Weekend Television. It ran for two series on ITV, from 1979 to 1980 and was an attempt at a TV version of The Burkiss Way. The first series concerned the lives of Norman and Vera Straightman, who had their lives interrupted by various television personalities of the day. The second series was mainly a straight succession of parodies of TV shows of the time, including Larry Grayson's Generation Game and Nationwide. After being absent for the entire season, Norman and Vera make a surprise reappearance at the end of the final episode.

== Cast ==
The cast included Sue Holderness, Denise Coffey, Fred Harris, Dudley Stevens, David Simeon, and Tony Aitken. Coffey had appeared in The Burkiss Way's first 6 episodes, but Harris was the only permanent cast member to appear in End of Part One. One of the directors was future feature film director Geoffrey Sax.

== Episodes and scheduling ==
Both series were shown on Sunday afternoons. Series 1 was transmitted between 15 April and 27 May 1979 at 5.30pm with series 2 being transmitted between 12 October and 23 November 1980 at 4.00pm.

Marshall and Renwick blamed the show's relative lack of success due to it being shown in a Sunday afternoon timeslot, lamenting in an interview that it was "a show no-one knows about, at a time no-one would watch it anyway." In 1981, they decided not to write another series because LWT would not move it to a more favourable timeslot.

=== Repeats ===
Although End of Part One never received a network repeat, some ITV companies did repeat either or both series and in some cases, in the later timeslot originally envisaged by the writers.

Known repeat slots are:

- Anglia: October – December 1981, early evenings
- Grampian: 30 June – 11 August 1981 at 5.15
- Scottish: 9 July – 27 August 1981, 6.30 +
- LWT – July–August 1980 (series 1) and July–August 1981 (series 2), Friday nights
- Southern: July –September 1981
- TSW: January–March 1982, Thursday afternoons
- Tyne Tees: July–August 1981, 5.15.

== Home release ==
The complete series was issued on DVD by Network Releasing on 5 November 2012.
