= The Burkiss Way =

BBC Radio 4 comedy show

- Genre: Sketch comedy
- Running time: 30 minutes
- Country of origin: United Kingdom
- Language: English
- Home station: BBC Radio 4
- Syndicates: BBC Radio 4 Extra
- Starring: Denise Coffey (series 1); Jo Kendall (series 2–6); Chris Emmett; Nigel Rees; Fred Harris
- Written by: Andrew Marshall; David Renwick
- Produced by: Simon Brett (series 1–2); John Lloyd (series 3–4); David Hatch (series 5–6)
- Recording studio: BBC Paris Studio, Lower Regent Street, London
- Original release: 27 August 1976 – 15 November 1980
- No. of series: 6
- No. of episodes: 47
- Audio format: Stereo (Lessons 1–5, 28 onwards); Mono (Lessons 7–27); Unknown (Lesson 6)
- Website: https://www.bbc.co.uk/programmes/b00c8x5n

The Burkiss Way is a BBC Radio 4 sketch comedy series, originally broadcast between August 1976 and November 1980. It was written by Andrew Marshall and David Renwick, with additional material in series 1 and 2 by John Mason, Colin Bostock-Smith, Douglas Adams, John Lloyd, Tom Magee Englefield and Liz Pollock.

The first series of the show starred Denise Coffey, Chris Emmett, Nigel Rees and Fred Harris. From series 2 onwards the show starred Jo Kendall, Chris Emmett, Nigel Rees and Fred Harris. The series had three producers, announced as "Simon Brett of Stepney", "John Lloyd of Europe" and "David 'Hatch of the BBC' Hatch".

The show's humour was based on surrealism and literary and media parodies, sprinkled with puns.

== Format ==
Burkiss Way, "Eric Von Contrick" sketch excerpt
An excerpt from Douglas Adams's Burkiss Way sketch, "Eric Von Contrick" excerpt

The series had its roots in two half-hour sketch shows entitled Half-Open University which Marshall and Renwick had written with Mason for Radio 3 as a parody of Open University programmes. The first, broadcast on 25 August 1975, spoofed science, the second, on 1 January 1976 and repeated on 1 December that year, history.

In a similar vein, The Burkiss Way was styled around fictional correspondence courses by "Professor Emil Burkiss" entitled The Burkiss Way to Dynamic Living, and each episode or "lesson" had a number and a title based on one of the course's subjects: "Lesson 1: Peel Bananas the Burkiss Way", "Lesson 2: Pass Examinations the Burkiss Way" and so on. Although the numbers and titles were maintained throughout the run, a significant change of style early in the second series saw the radio correspondence course become a hook rather than a narrative device, and it was mentioned only in passing.

From here on the programme continued in a more conventional sketch format, though it was to use increasingly Pythonesque devices including surreal, stream-of-consciousness linking, back-referencing and aggregation. Like the Pythons before them, the writers lampooned and tinkered with the medium on which the show was broadcast, including spoofs of Radio 4's continuity style. Many later episodes had false endings, sometimes disguised as genuine continuity announcements. The opening and closing credits might be anywhere within the show. One show ran backwards from the closing to the opening credits, whilst another was allegedly dropped, broken and glued together with a tube of BBC coffee, resulting in disjointed running order with many sketches beginning and ending in mid-sentence. For one pair of shows, one sentence was split over two programmes, with "Eric ..." ending lesson 37 and "... Pode of Croydon" starting lesson 38.

As time went on the show became increasingly surreal and in several sketches the writers seemed to see how many strange ideas they could cram into a sketch. For example, one later episode contains a sketch about an amoeba employed by the Department of Civil Service Staff Recruitment and Fisheries as a token Desmond Dekker and the Aces but who keeps reproducing asexually by mitosis while singing a Lee Dorsey song.

Brassband Boogie as used in the show

Brassband Boogie at the original speed

The theme music for the show is Brass Band Boogie by the G.U.S Footwear Band (from EMI 33SX 1455 Bandstand No.6). As played on the show it has been sped up from 33 1/3 rpm to 78 rpm, hence its rather peculiar tinny sound.

== Contributors ==
In the first series Chris Emmett made several appearances as a dirty old man; in episode 2, his character became prime minister thanks to the Burkiss Way. The fourth episode of series one, "Solve Murders the Burkiss Way", featured the voice as "Eric Pode of Croydon" as a disguise of mass-murderess "Beatrice Crint of Chingford". The same voice was used in the next episode, "Keep Unfit the Burkiss Way", as "Ron Pode of Hackney" and from series 2 this voice resumed as Eric Pode of Croydon, becoming one of the show's few recurring characters and the only one not a parody of a real person. He is a man with unsavoury habits, inspired by Round the Horne's "J. Peasemold Gruntfuttock". Each week he is interviewed by Fred Harris's character, who calls him Mister Croydon, is disgusted by his habits and puns, and always remarks, "isn't he a panic". This was one of the show's two catchphrases, the other being "there will now be a short intermission". There was usually a series of linked sketches through each episode, the intermission sketches providing a break.

The fact that Douglas Adams had written for the show did not prevent his becoming a target for satire. He was parodied as Mister Different Adams whose catchphrase is "I see comedy as a kind of...". Adams's The Hitchhiker's Guide to the Galaxy was also a target; the 1979 Christmas show (Eric Pode of Croydon's Easter Special) closes with Peter Jones as his HHGTTG character, The Book, attempting to vilify BBC Radio 4 for broadcasting The Burkiss Way, but in typical fashion, he is cut off in mid-sentence.

== Broadcast history ==
The Burkiss Way ran to 47 episodes in five production series (including a special Christmas episode between the next-to-last and the last series), but the episode and series numbering are derailed by "Lesson 31" and "Lesson 32", which are a single episode masquerading as two half-episodes, the first of which ends series 3 and the second of which begins purported series 4 (comprising the remaining two episodes in the third production series – hence the official series numbering running up to six).

There are two "Lesson 39"s, both entitled "Repeat Yourself the Burkiss Way", which have identical beginnings. The consequence is that "Lesson 33" to the first "Lesson 39" inclusive have lesson numbers that are one greater than the cumulative number; from the second "Lesson 39" onward the correct numbering is restored. (The second Lesson 39 is never broadcast today as, although it was certainly not written with that intention, the last 5-6 minutes are now seen as very racist.)

A sketch in Lesson 28 featuring unsubtle references to newscaster Reginald Bosanquet's alcoholism was cut following the first broadcast and the excised material was never reinstated. The last episode was cut short by 6 minutes on its first repeat transmission, on the instructions of the controller of BBC Radio 4. The missing material lampooned the grovelling approach of Radio 4 to the Queen Mother's 80th birthday celebrations. Repeats on BBC7 remained censored until a restored version was first broadcast in Celebrate The Burkiss Way on BBC7 on Saturday 4 April 2009.

The show gained a cult following and has had several reruns on BBC 7 / BBC Radio 4 Extra. Listeners have complained about some omissions, notably lesson 6, while episodes 7 to 27 inclusive have been broadcast in mono. The omissions and the variation in audio format do not indicate that episodes have been lost or wiped, as the BBC is known to have all episodes in its archive. Unusually, the early shows were recorded in stereo, with some later ones being in mono. Lesson 6 is unique in being only 15 minutes long, which makes it difficult to accommodate in R4 Extra's schedule.

== Episode list ==
Series	Lesson	Title	First broadcast
1	1	"Peel Bananas the Burkiss Way"	27 August 1976
1	2	"Pass Examinations the Burkiss Way"	3 September 1976
1	3	"Escape from Prison the Burkiss Way" also known as "The Burkiss Special with James Burkiss"	10 September 1976
1	4	"Solve Murders the Burkiss Way"	17 September 1976
1	5	"Keep Unfit the Burkiss Way"	24 September 1976
1	6	"Win Awards the Burkiss Way"	1 October 1976
2	7	"Influence Friends and Win People the Burkiss Way"	15 December 1976
2	8	"Plan Christmas Schedules the Burkiss Way"	22 December 1976
2	9	"Gain Spiritual Fulfilment the Burkiss Way"	29 December 1976
2	10	"Govern Britain the Burkiss Way"	5 January 1977
2	11	"Journey into the Unknown the Burkiss Way"	12 January 1977
2	12	"Make Short Comedy Programmes the Burkiss Way"	19 January 1977
2	13	"Commemorate Jubilees the Burkiss Way"	26 January 1977
2	14	"Do You Know What the Burkiss Way"	2 February 1977
2	15	"Skive From School the Burkiss Way"	9 February 1977
2	16	"Get Off With Life the Burkiss Way"	16 February 1977
2	17	"This Is Your Life the Burkiss Way"	23 February 1977
2	18	"Become a Rock Star the Burkiss Way"	2 March 1977
2	19	"Replace the Burkiss Way"	9 March 1977
3	20	"Discover Gravity the Burkiss Way"	15 November 1977
3	21	"Get Cut Off the Bur..."	22 November 1977
3	22	"How to Succeed in Business the Burkiss Way"	29 November 1977
3	23	"Son of the Burkiss Way"	6 December 1977
3	24	"One Hour to the Burkiss Way"	13 December 1977
3	25	"Not to be Opened Until Christmas the Burkiss Way"	20 December 1977
3	26	"First Prize the Burkiss Way"	27 December 1977
3	27	"Around the World the Burkiss Way"	3 January 1978
3	28	"Ignore These Programme Titles the Burkiss Way"	10 January 1978
3	29	"Complain About the Burkiss Way"	17 January 1978
3	30	"Not the Burkiss Way"	24 January 1978
3	31	"Bruce's Choice" †	31 January 1978
4	32	"Start New Series the Burkiss Way" †	31 January 1978
4	33	"The Last Burkiss Way"	7 February 1978
4	34	"The Next to Last Burkiss Way"	14 February 1978
5	35	"Remember the Burkiss Way"	2 April 1979
5	36	"Rise from the Grave the Burkiss Way"	9 April 1979
5	37	"Is Britain Going the Burkiss Way? (part 1)"	16 April 1979
5	38	"Is Britain Going the Burkiss Way? (part 2)"	23 April 1979
5	39	"Repeat Yourself the Burkiss Way" ‡	30 April 1979
5	39	"Repeat Yourself the Burkiss Way" ‡	7 May 1979
5	40	"Avoid Like the Plague the Burkiss Way"	14 May 1979
Special	41	"Eric Pode of Croydon's Easter Special"	26 December 1979
6	42	"The Man From the Burkiss Way"	11 October 1980
6	43	"Sack the Burkiss Way"	18 October 1980
6	44	"Love Big Brother the Burkiss Way"	25 October 1980
6	45	"Write extremely long titles with lots and lots of words in, like this, so that the Radio Times will have to allot more space than the measly half a centimetre of billing space we usually get and at least it'll look a bit more prominent on the page, although still nowhere near the 50 column inches they give to The Hitchhiker's Guide to the Galaxy the Burkiss Way" also known as "Write Extremely Long Titles the Burkiss Way"	1 November 1980
6	46	"Settle Out of Court the Burkiss Way"	8 November 1980
6	47	"Wave Goodbye to CBEs the Burkiss Way"	15 November 1980

† Lessons 31 and 32 were in fact a single 30-minute show masquerading as two 15-minute episodes.

‡ The two lessons numbered 39 with identical titles were different, but started exactly the same way.

Because of these anomalies, all of the episodes between Lesson 33 and the first Lesson 39 have lesson numbers that are one greater than the actual half-hour episode numeration.

== Releases and other media ==
A book, Bestseller! The Life and Death of Eric Pode of Croydon, was published by Allen & Unwin in 1981, loosely based on sketches from the series.

A BBC Radio Collection in 1994 contained excerpts rather than complete episodes.

A BBC Radio Collection in 2010 contained the complete first series.

== Reception ==
In his 1981 book, Laughter in the Air: An Informal History of British Radio Comedy, Barry Took described The Burkiss Way as "an irreverent, surreal romp through the conscious and unconscious mind" and, on presenting extracts from the scripts, wrote "you really need a full half-hour to absorb the constant shifts of attitude and changes of direction."

In 2018, Rob Grant claimed he "really admired The Burkiss Way," saying "it was a terrifically funny show and I loved it."

== See also ==
- End of Part One (a TV show in a similar style by the same writers)
