= Whoops Apocalypse =

1982 British television sitcom for ITV

- Opening titles
- Created by: Andrew Marshall & David Renwick
- Directed by: John Reardon
- Starring: Barry Morse; Geoffrey Palmer; John Cleese; Peter Jones; John Barron
- Composer: Nigel Hess
- Country of origin: United Kingdom
- Original language: English
- No. of series: 1
- No. of episodes: 6

Production
- Producer: Humphrey Barclay
- Running time: 30 minutes
- Production company: London Weekend Television

Original release
- Network: ITV
- Release: 14 March – 18 April 1982

Whoops Apocalypse is a six-part 1982 television sitcom by Andrew Marshall and David Renwick, made by London Weekend Television for ITV. Marshall and Renwick later reworked the concept as a 1986 film of the same name from ITC Entertainment, with almost completely different characters and plot.

The British budget label Channel 5 Video released a compilation VHS cassette of all six episodes edited together into one 137-minute chunk in 1987.

The American video distributor EDDE Entertainment released a compilation VHS cassette of all six episodes edited together into one 121-minute chunk in 1991.

In 2010, Network released both the complete, unedited series and the movie on a 2-DVD set (Region 2) entitled Whoops Apocalypse: The Complete Apocalypse. (Rights issues were simplified by the fact that both LWT and ITC Entertainment productions were by this time owned by Granada Television).

In March 2022 the series was made available for streaming on BritBox.

== Series ==
The series details the weeks leading up to the Apocalypse. It features a chaotic and increasingly unstable global political situation in which nuclear alerts are accidentally triggered by malfunctioning Space Invaders machines. The naïve and highly unpopular Republican U.S. President Johnny Cyclops (a Ronald Reagan parody, played by Barry Morse) is advised by an insane right-wing fundamentalist security advisor, called The Deacon, who claims to have a direct hotline to God. The Deacon was so named because of the previous role of the actor who played him (John Barron) as a Cathedral Dean in the sitcom All Gas and Gaiters; the writers claimed not to know at the time that Alexander Haig, Reagan's first Secretary of State, was known as The Vicar in the White House.

In the Eastern Hemisphere, things are similarly unstable. Soviet Premier Dubienkin (Richard Griffiths) is in fact a series of clones, who keep dying and being replaced. Meanwhile, the deposed Shah of Iran, Shah Massiq Rassim (Bruce Montague), led by his advisor Abdab (David Kelly) who is always blindfolded to avoid looking upon the Shah's magnificence, is shunted around the world in search of a refuge, spending most of the series in a cross channel ferry's toilet.

The main danger is the Deacon's development of a new super-powerful American nuclear weapon. This is originally called the Johnny Cyclops Bomb; later, when the President vetoes the name, it is renamed the Quark Bomb (Formerly Known As The Johnny Cyclops Bomb After The President of the Same Name). The Deacon arranges for Lacrobat (John Cleese), a disguised international arms smuggler nicknamed The Devil (a parody of Carlos the Jackal), to steal a Quark Bomb and take it to Iran, to help the Shah in his counterrevolution. The Soviets get word of this and decide to invade, gaining control over the world's oil supply.

The Soviets have a new ally in British Prime Minister Kevin Pork (Peter Jones), a parody of left-wing Labour politicians Michael Foot and Peter Shore, with the appearance and mannerism of Roy Jenkins. Pork, who has gone insane and believes himself to be Superman, heads an especially left-wing government. The British Foreign Secretary is blackmailed by the Soviets to join the Warsaw Pact. This situation so unnerves the foreign secretary (Geoffrey Palmer, in a role based on David Owen) and the Chancellor of the Exchequer (Richard Davies) that they also lose their sanity, don Green Lantern and Hawkman costumes, and are locked up in a padded cell at 10 Downing Street.

The Soviets are also holding two elderly American tourists named Jonathan and Martha Hopper captive. They are constantly tortured by Commissar Alex Solzhenitsyn ("no relation", played by Alexei Sayle) in the belief they are secretly CIA spies. This turns out to be true, but the Hoppers are crushed by a helicopter in a bungled CIA rescue operation. This does not help Cyclops's nosediving popularity rating, which is just below that of Charles Manson. The Deacon stages an assassination attempt in order to help Cyclops' flagging popularity, which backfires when the speeding ambulance carrying Cyclops to the hospital accidentally runs over his highly popular main opponent, Democratic Senator Jimmy Hennessy (a parody of Senator Teddy Kennedy). By the end of the series we're told Cyclops is now less popular than the Boston Strangler. These developments are followed by a dramatic newsreader named Jay Garrick, and his topless female counterpart across the Atlantic.

Eventually the Quark Bomb is accidentally detonated in Israel when Lacrobat's attempt to prevent it being incinerated goes horribly wrong, destroying the country and killing most of the US army who were stationed there. Meanwhile, the Shah, who has temporarily been given sanctuary aboard a space shuttle, manages to crash it into the Moscow Kremlin. Believing it to be a bomb, the Russians launch their weapons at America. In the final scene Soviet missiles are on their way to obliterate the United States and President Cyclops has to decide whether to retaliate. The title sequence already showed the aftermath of the decision, Earth reduced to a nuclear wasteland. In a final twist, we discover that the woman we see in the title sequence selling buttons reading "WEAR YOUR MUSHROOM WITH PRIDE" is in fact the First Lady, who was hidden in a fallout shelter and is one of the few survivors of the war.

== Cast ==
- Barry Morse as President Johnny Cyclops
- John Barron as The Deacon, Presidential Advisor
- Richard Griffiths as Premier Dubienkin
- John Cleese as Lacrobat
- Peter Jones as Prime Minister Kevin Pork
- Bruce Montague as Shah Mashiq Rassim
- Ed Bishop as Jay Garrick, Newsreader
- Geoffrey Palmer as British Foreign Secretary
- Richard Davies as British Chancellor of the Exchequer
- Alexei Sayle as Commissar Solzhenitsyn (no relation)
- David Kelly as Abdab

Also appearing are: Kirstie Pooley as British Newsreader, Matt Zimmerman as Dean, Bob Sherman as Buzz, Lou Hirsch as Jed Grodd, Jack Klaff as Dwight, Ed Devereaux as General E.F. "Gizzard" Pemberley, Rik Mayall as Biff and small uncredited roles by Stuart Milligan, Carmen Silvera, John Dair and Pat Astley.

== Film ==
In 1986, a film of the same title was released. The plot of the film is almost completely different from the TV series, but does share certain commonalities.

British Prime Minister Sir Mortimer Chris (Peter Cook), a conservative politician who goes insane, is a fusion of US President Johnny Cyclops and UK Prime Minister Kevin Pork.

== See also ==
- Woops! - An American sitcom with a similar premise and title that is set after the apocalypse has already occurred.
