= Love Soup =

- Genre: Romantic comedy drama
- Written by: David Renwick
- Starring: Tamsin Greig; Sheridan Smith; Montserrat Lombard; Owen Brenman; Michael Landes (series 1); Trudie Styler (series 1); Mark Heap (series 2); Amelia Curtis (series 2)
- Opening theme: "Alley Boogie" by Georgia White
- Ending theme: Reprise
- Country of origin: United Kingdom
- No. of series: 2
- No. of episodes: 18

Production
- Executive producers: David Renwick; Jon Plowman
- Producer: Verity Lambert
- Running time: 60 min. (series 1); 30 min. (series 2)

Original release
- Network: BBC One
- Release: 27 September 2005 – 17 May 2008

Love Soup is a British television comedy drama produced by the BBC and first screened on BBC One in the autumn of 2005. It stars Tamsin Greig as Alice Chenery (a role written especially for her) and Michael Landes as Gil Raymond (series 1 only). The series is written by David Renwick, directed by Sandy Johnson and Christine Gernon and was produced by Verity Lambert. This was the last programme that Lambert produced before she died. The programme was initially a critical success although its audience figures were steady rather than spectacular, netting an average of five million viewers an episode. Renwick and his former scriptwriting partner Andrew Marshall have cameo appearances in one episode as members of a television sitcom scriptwriting team.

The second series started on 1 March 2008 and finished on 17 May 2008. This series contained changes from the first, including a switch from six 60-minute episodes, to 12 episodes of 30 minutes.

The theme tune to Love Soup is "Alley Boogie" by jazz singer Georgia White.

The first series was released on DVD Region 2 on 3 December 2007. The second series (and a boxset containing both series) was released on 10 May 2008.

== Situation ==
Alice Chenery (Tamsin Greig) and Gil Raymond (Michael Landes) are perfect for each other. They like the same things, respect the same things, and share the same beliefs. The only problem is that they are completely unaware of each other's existence.

Alice is a modern woman with old-fashioned values, who lives in Brighton, and commutes to London, where she is the regional manager of a perfume company concession in a department store. She is trying to sell her flat and move, without success. Her love life is no success either. She can never find the perfect man. What is worse, her colleagues, Cleo Martin (Sheridan Smith) and Milly Russel (Montserrat Lombard), always seem to have more success with men, though their relationships never really last more than a week. Cleo and Milly try to pair her up with several men, but to no avail. She does have some family members (at least one cousin), but her parents, Arthur and Grace, are both dead.

Gil is an American comedy writer, who has moved to England to start a new project with TV producer Lloyd Drewitt (Owen Brenman). It is a series of six romantic comedies called Love Soup and he has been asked to write one of them. Things started badly for Gil when he arrived at his house (15 Carpenters Lane, Larch End), and discovered his girlfriend was seeing another man as soon as they arrived in the country. His next door neighbours are Bob and Irene Andrews (Brian Protheroe and Trudie Styler), who split up after Gil accidentally exposes Bob's affair with a prostitute. Afterwards, Gil becomes increasingly worried about Irene's intentions towards him.

The series follows both Alice and Gil's somewhat forlorn attempts to find the perfect partner, while it is clear to the viewer that they would be the ideal couple. The series itself follows each plot separately, cutting from Alice's story to Gil's throughout the episode. The only exception is the final scene of the first series, which shows Alice in the theatre watching a comedy where she is the only person in the entire audience not laughing – apart from Gil, who is sitting two rows behind her. They still do not find each other.

In the third episode of the second series, Alice arranges a date through a personal ad in a magazine. When he fails to turn up she returns home and rips up his photograph. She receives a phone call from Lloyd, telling her that his friend could not make the date. The reason is not stated on screen, but Alice, clearly shaken, picks up the torn photograph and reassembles it, it is a photo of Gil. In the next episode, it is revealed that Gil died of a heart attack. In the seventh episode of the series, Alice is invited into Gil's world via Lloyd, where she begins a relationship with a writer, Douglas McVitie (Mark Heap). After a while she feels that there is little love in the relationship so she tries to break it up; Douglas, however, is determined to stay with her. Alice also moves in with Fae Maddison (Amelia Curtis), a famous actress she meets after a date goes horribly wrong.

== Episodes ==
=== Season 1 ===
#	Title	Written by	Duration (mins)
1	There Must Be Some Way Out of Here	David Renwick	60
Alice becomes worried about her security after she discovers her estate agent has been doing her washing in her flat. Gil causes his next door neighbours to split up, and goes on a date with a TV executive.
2	Death and Nurses	David Renwick	60
Alice receives a disturbing text message from her Godson, and Milly has problems with her boyfriend after reading a magazine article. Gil toys with his Love Soup idea where Britain is run by tabloid newspapers, and gets in a tricky situation at a dinner party at Irene's.
3	The Reflecting Pool	David Renwick	60
Gil is asked to open a swimming pool, and meets a fan of his work, later discovering she used to be a Hells Angel. Alice tries to defy her boss when she is asked to make a speech using the text of Martin Luther King's "I Have A Dream" speech.
4	They Do Not Move	David Renwick	60
Gil is forced to watch a rather poor all-woman version of Waiting for Godot, and is then asked on a dinner date by a rather sexy actress. Alice bumps into an old friend, but later regrets their reunion, whilst Milly is blissfully unaware that her new boyfriend looks almost exactly like Jesus Christ. Guest stars Bernie Clifton.
5	Take Five	David Renwick	60
Alice finds herself the centre of attraction from the man living in flat number 12, and is asked to sign a petition to get a "Talking gravestone" removed. Gil is asked to join a comedy writing team to write a sitcom pilot for a talentless documentary star, and starts to become attracted to a fellow writer. In the meantime, Bob asks Irene for forgiveness.
6	War Is Heck	David Renwick	60
The wife of Alice's cousin Stephen is going to jail, and she asks to keep an eye on him and their daughter, but Alice starts to wonder about Stephen's intentions towards her. Irene and Bob get back together, and tell Gil that Bob's mother wants to see him. She later dies, leaving a £17,000 fortune all to him, "For picking up my spoon."

=== Season 2 ===
- Episode 1: Smoke and Shadows Alice is worried when her predatory regional manager Catherine Sumpter (Rebecca Front) visits her, who is suspected of being a lesbian. She also worries about the intentions of her driving instructor. During one lesson, Alice is carjacked. Milly is in love with a shadow and Cleo discovers her boyfriend has made negative comments about her in a journal.
- Episode 2: Integrated Logistics Cleo attempts to fix up Alice with a sales rep, but the date ends in failure. She then becomes involved in a Dickensian romance. Cleo also offends Milly by her attempts to put a man off her by claiming that Milly is a man.
- Episode 3: Dream Twister Alice meets Mitch (Sanjeev Bhaskar), an old-school friend who has since become a lecturer. However, she worries that one of his students may be stalking him. Alice goes on a date with a man she meets through a lonely hearts column. He doesn't turn up, and when she reaches home she tears up his photo.
- Episode 4: The Menaced Assassin A web of romantic deceit leads to Alice accidentally being caught up with the Metropolitan Police anti-terrorism unit. Cleo discovers some people taking part in dominance and submission games in a recycling centre. Milly has a relationship with a man who is half Native American.
- Episode 5: Ragged Claws Alice falls for Matthew Carter, who sends her into a world full of smart cars, up-market restaurants and posh parties. Cleo and Milly fight over the same boyfriend and other more trivial matters.
- Episode 6: Sophisticated Lady In an attempt to find Alice her perfect partner, Milly and Cleo health-screen every available man in the department store by looking at their confidential prescription records at the store's pharmacy.
- Episode 7: Green Widow Alice is so short of money that she is forced to rent out her flat in Brighton and find cheaper accommodation in London, which ends up with her living with Milly. Lloyd meets Alice and introducers her to Douglas McVitie (Mark Heap), a writer who worked with Gil.
- Episode 8: Lobotomy Bay Alice and Douglas begin to have a physical relationship and end up in trouble over an answering machine message. They have dinner with Douglas ex-girlfriend, who is working on a cartoon series, whom Alice later discovers features an unflattering character that looks like her. Guest stars Bill Bailey.
- Episode 9: Kiss of Death Alice goes to a play at the Royal Court featuring one of her lifelong heroes, Gordon Bexter (Ronnie Corbett). Baxter reveals that he is currently directing a controversial play about necrophilia written by the German playwright Stefan (Patrick Monckeberg). Alice decides there is no spark in her relationship with Douglas, and calls it off, but Douglas believes that the break-up is not working and they get back together.
- Episode 10: Whose God is it Anyway? Alice moves in with actress Fae Maddison, whose dying Jewish father is getting married. He asks Alice to pray for him, and the prayer gets answered, with it being revealed that he is going to live after all. As a result, his wife blames Alice for interfering with God. Douglas is trying to cope with the break-up by having acupuncture, taking drugs and dating his ironing lady (Joanna Page) – but there is more to her than meets the eye.
- Episode 11: Human Error Alice has problems coping with Fae's behaviour. A long-forgotten film script written by Douglas looks as if it will be finally produced. However, the actor who is due to play the lead role, Marty Cady (Mackenzie Crook) appears to be too much to handle, especially after news reports circle about him and a dead prostitute. However, Douglas agrees to go to Marty's villa for six weeks to write the pilot. Lloyd ends up having a one-night stand with a woman with no arms.
- Episode 12: Home When Douglas fails to contact Alice after 12 days; she begins to believe that their relationship is over. When Lloyd's relationship ends, Alice stops him from committing suicide. Lloyd gives Alice a CD containing Gil's diaries, which she reads and is moved to tears by. She later visits Gil's house and rests on the gate like Gil did in series 1. As she does this, Gil appears resting on the gate, she looks his way, doesn't see him, looks back to the house and he disappears.

== Reception ==
Views of Love Soup are mixed. Andrew Billen in The Times said that, "Like David Renwick's previous sitcom creation, Victor Meldrew [from One Foot in the Grave], Alice is meant to represent a bunch of prevailing attitudes. In fact, like him, she is entirely implausible. Happily, this fundamental error makes her no less funny."

James Walton in the Daily Telegraph commented negatively about the loss of Landes saying, "In the first series Gil's job as a TV scriptwriter meant that Renwick could always add a bit of edge by attacking modern television. Without that, and with Alice remaining so utterly lovely, the tone is often surprisingly soppy." The basis for this was subsequently rendered redundant as Alice began to move in media circles via her association with Lloyd, Douglas and Fae. Walton also wrote however that, "Renwick does his usual professional job with the script, and Greig is as good as ever at registering various shades of disappointment."

Sam Wollaston in The Guardian was critical of Love Soup writing, "I don't like the fact that so little happens. Or how implausible the few things that do happen are. I know it's meant to be comedy, not a reflection of real life; but it helps if comedy can keep a toe in plausibility (unless it's so crazy, like Green Wing, that it's funny for that very reason). But Milly falling in love with a shadow – actually more like a projection of a man on to the side of a van that miraculously happens outside her flat every night – well, that's just stupid. And I don't like its irritating jazzy soundtrack, or how small and British it all feels (and I mean both in the worst possible way). Love Soup is insipid broth and I've had enough already."
