= Backwards (novel) =

1996 novel by Rob Grant

- First edition cover
- Author: Rob Grant
- Language: English
- Series: Red Dwarf
- Genre: Sci Fi Comedy
- Publisher: Viking Books
- Publication date: 5 February 1996
- Publication place: United Kingdom
- Media type: Print (Paperback & Hardback)
- Pages: 352 pp (first edition, hardback)
- ISBN: 0-670-84574-4 (first edition, hardback)
- OCLC: 35137434
- Preceded by: Last Human
- Followed by: Red Dwarf: Titan

Backwards is the fourth Red Dwarf novel, directly succeeding Grant Naylor-written Infinity Welcomes Careful Drivers and Better Than Life, and existing in a separate continuity from Last Human written by Doug Naylor. It is set in a fictional universe version of Earth where time moves backwards.

The novel was written solely by Rob Grant and is his only solo Red Dwarf novel, Grant having previously stepped down from co-writing with Naylor for the television show after its Series VI finale, Out of Time. It contains plot elements from the episodes Backwards, Dimension Jump, and Gunmen of the Apocalypse.

An audiobook of Backwards was also produced, read by the author.

== Plot summary ==
=== On the Backwards World ===
The Red Dwarf crew arrive in Universe 3, where time runs backwards, in order to rescue Lister, who has returned to life and regressed-back to the age of 25 (following his death at age 61 the end of the previous novel, Better Than Life) as a result of the crew depositing his body on the time-reversed Earth 36 years earlier. After failing to meet Lister at the arranged rendezvous, Kryten learns from the television that Lister and Cat are associated with a murder that, due to the backwards flow of time, has not yet been committed. Lister soon arrives injured and in the custody of the police who, after a backwards fight which restores Lister to health, promptly unarrest him. Lister then takes off in backwards pursuit of one of the officers, explaining to the others that due to the nature of reverse time he is forced to follow the policeman (who if time were running forwards would be chasing him) until he is 'unspotted'. After a harrowing backwards car-chase (especially for Rimmer, who is unable to trust that no harm can befall him while time is running backwards) the policeman un-sees them, and the crew retreat to the mountain area where they landed their ship, the Starbug.

When they arrive, the crew examine Starbug to find most of the landing jets missing and the underside a mess of rust and badly-repaired damage. Unable to understand how it happened, but realising that on the backwards Earth they will need the landing jets to perform a take-off, they begin searching for the missing jets. While searching Kryten discovers the body of a hillbilly, who has been killed with a pickaxe. He panics when the corpse begins returning to life and removes the pickaxe from the man's chest. Once the man leaves, Kryten replays the incident 'forwards' and realises he was responsible for killing the man, a serious breach of his programming not to harm humans. Overwhelmed by guilt, Kryten shuts himself down. Upon learning what's happened, Lister realises that this was the murder for which he was imprisoned and is overwhelmed at finally learning that he was not only innocent but Kryten was the one responsible for his lengthy prison sentence. Despite this, Lister forgives him and tries to get him working again.

Having only found one landing jet and that in terrible condition, and with Lister busy repairing Kryten, the crew's attempt at a reverse landing fails and they are trapped in the reverse universe, having missed their window. Kryten is eventually fixed and he informs them they will have to wait ten years for another opportunity to leave.

Ten years pass, and while Kryten and Rimmer are physically unaffected, the reverse time of backwards Earth means Lister and The Cat are now 15. During the wait, The Cat becomes a virgin during a bizarre sexual encounter with a female cousin of the 'un-murdered' hillbilly, and the crew busy themselves reburying the landing jet they found and 'un-repairing' the damage to Starbug, which begins to become less rusted but more damaged as the reverse landing window approaches. When the time arrives, the crew begin the reverse landing, sending the underpowered ship scraping backwards over a nearby mountain, a process which repairs much of the damage as several landing jets leap from the forest and reattach themselves. With the craft still out of control, they are un-struck by a missile from the American 'Star Wars' defence system, which had misidentified Starbug as a threat. With the remainder of the damage repaired, the crew leave for their own universe to rendezvous with Red Dwarf, but find it to be missing without a trace.

=== The Search for Red Dwarf ===
Unknown to them, Holly, the Red Dwarf computer, has been reversing the process of his intelligence compression (performed in 'Better Than Life'), reducing his IQ to increase his operational lifespan. Unfortunately, he takes the process too far, leaving him so stupid that he is unable to reverse the procedure or prevent Red Dwarf falling into the hands of the Agonoids, who force him to divulge information about the crew. Delighted to discover the one remaining human (Lister) is among them, the Agonoids begin to plan his demise, ripping Holly's components from the ship and jettisoning them before converting Red Dwarf into a giant torture chamber.

Discovering the remains of Holly, the Dwarf crew learn of the Agonoid threat, but with food and fuel supplies on Starbug severely low, and their power situation made even worse by the energy required to power up Holly's remains even for the brief time they spoke with him, they have no options available but to head for Red Dwarf regardless.

At the same time, in a parallel universe, Ace Rimmer is preparing to test pilot a ship capable of crossing dimensions. The brave, heroic and charismatic Ace (a complete contrast to the neurotic Rimmer) arrives in the Red Dwarf timeline, materialising so close to Starbug as to severely damage both ships. Coming over to Starbug to help with repairs, Ace deduces it may be possible to rig up his ship to take the crew home.

The Agonoids meanwhile are fighting for the right to torture and kill the last remaining human. Djuhn'Keep, the most intelligent Agonoid—having tricked and dismantled another for spare parts due to his own poor physical condition, only having been spared destruction so far due to his technical skills—succeeds in jettisoning the others into space, but notices to his chagrin that one, Pizzak'Rapp, is headed directly for Starbug. Pizzak'Rapp attempts to break into the ship, but Ace sacrifices himself to send the Agonoid into space.

Meanwhile, Djuhn'Keep arrives on Starbug, just as the oxygen supply fails. Horrified at losing the opportunity to torture Lister, Djuhn swiftly repairs the Oxygeneration unit. Kryten bazookoids the freshly repaired hull, causing a breach which sucks the Agonoid into space. The crew then learn that Djuhn has infected the ship's NaviComp with a computer virus (the Armageddon virus), causing them to be locked on course towards a nearby planet. Kryten decides to deliberately contract the virus to create an antidote, cryptically telling the crew to 'watch his dreams' before becoming unresponsive.

Entering Kryten's dream-state through a VR machine, the crew find themselves in a replica of an old Western, with the various characters representing Kryten's characteristics ('Wyatt Memory', 'Billy Belief', etc.), being threatened by 'the Apocalypse boys', representing the virus. Kryten's consciousness is represented by the town lawman, Sheriff Carton, but the recent death of Wyatt Memory has cost Kryten his memory of what he is meant to be doing, although the crew are able to remind him of enough crucial details to finish his work.

In order to buy Kryten time, the crew (Rimmer, Lister and The Cat), adopt personas from a VR Western game, Streets of Larado, and enter the game to assist him. With impeccable skills in fighting, knife-throwing and shooting provided by the VR machine, along with the knowledge that they cannot be injured, they attempt to take on the Apocalypse boys to distract them from destroying the town or killing Sheriff Carton. However, the virus spreads to the VR machine the crew is connected to, sealing them into the artificial reality, removing their 'special skills' and allowing them to feel pain; fortunately, Lister and Cat cannot be actually killed, although Rimmer's light bee is still potentially vulnerable to the virus. The crew clash with the Apocalypse boys regardless, and are subject to terrible injuries; Lister is even decapitated at one point. However, Kryten has enough time to complete the antidote program just as the Apocalypse boys gun him down.

With the Apocalypse boys vapourised, Lister and The Cat return to reality to find the virus has killed both Kryten and Rimmer, destroying their mechanical components beyond repair. Since the VR machine only simulated their injuries, they find themselves unharmed. With the virus gone, they are able to control the ship, but since it has been accelerating for several hours there is not sufficient fuel left to avoid hitting the planet. Cramming into Ace's one-man ship Wildfire, which he had programmed for another jump, they cross dimensions—their only other option being to go back to an uninhabited and gutted Red Dwarf in this universe—finding themselves in a timeline where Kryten and Rimmer are still alive, but their own counterparts died playing Better Than Life. As they dock with the alternate Red Dwarf, Lister reflects that while this is not home, it might be close enough.

== See also ==
- Backwards (TV episode)
