= If You See God, Tell Him =

- Cover of the DVD release
- Genre: Sitcom; Black comedy
- Written by: Andrew Marshall; David Renwick
- Directed by: Marcus Mortimer
- Starring: Richard Briers; Adrian Edmondson; Imelda Staunton
- Country of origin: United Kingdom
- Original language: English
- No. of seasons: 1
- No. of episodes: 4

Production
- Producer: Marcus Mortimer

Original release
- Network: BBC1
- Release: 11 November – 9 December 1993

If You See God, Tell Him is a black comedy television sitcom starring Richard Briers, Adrian Edmondson, and Imelda Staunton. Written by Andrew Marshall and David Renwick, it was first broadcast on BBC1 in 1993. It comprised four episodes, each 45 minutes long, and was broadcast only once, apart from the first episode, which was repeated on BBC Four on 3 December 2007 as part of "David Renwick Night". The title is a reference to 'if you see Sid, tell him', the slogan used for the sale of shares in British Gas plc.

== Plot ==
The series is set in London and follows the character of Godfrey Spry, played by Briers. As he is standing outside the post office, a wheelbarrow full of building rubble falls on top of him, causing serious physical injuries (from which he recovers) and leaving him with a greatly reduced attention span. As a result, he spends most of his time watching television commercials, and believes every claim made by them. After seeing an advertisement for a car, he proceeds to copy it by test-driving the same car at high speed along the top of a cliff at sunset, the resulting accident leaving him paralysed.

He convinces his wife to take a relaxing break with him in Hamburg, which he describes to the viewer in idyllic terms, before casually mentioning that on the last night his wife 'popped out [of the hotel] for a packet of cough sweets and was stoned to death by a mob of drunken soccer fans'. This entire back-story is played out very early in episode one, with the main part of the series starting with Godfrey calling his nephew Gordon for help after his wife's death.

Every episode was punctuated by deadpan parody advertisements for fictional products and companies, often juxtaposing the idealistic view of the adverts with the far bleaker reality. Much of the humour of the show derived from Godfrey's cheery interpretations of unpleasant events and circumstances. One memorable scene involves him cheerfully passing a group of people outside his neighbour's flat, blissfully unaware that he has driven the man to suicide, attributing the man's disappearance to him moving up the property ladder.

In a later episode, Godfrey befriends a young school-boy after offering to purchase for him some age-restricted craft material. Godfrey however has a very bad influence on the boy and his school friends, as they turn in to a gang of shoplifters that become news media with an unidentified elderly man as the suspected ring-leader. Eventually the children are apprehended by the police, and an elderly member of the black community – who is also paraplegic – is mistaken for Godfrey and arrested; mass riots result in protest.

In the last episode, after seeing government advertisements promoting free-enterprise, Godfrey sets up his own business in Gordon and Muriel's house, hiring an elderly lady he met in hospital to knit tea-cosies in the shed. When she falls dead of a heart attack, Godfrey attempts to perform a post mortem, which he believes himself to be an expert in after purchasing a partwork of Complete Medical Knowledge. As a result, he is arrested for murder.

At the trial, Gordon makes an impassioned plea, claiming that it is not Godfrey who should be on trial, but the advertisers who are murdering all of our minds. Godfrey is convicted and sent to a hospital for the criminally insane; languishing in his cell, he is happy under the illusion that he is the centre of attention at a dinner party, where fancy chocolates are being served.

== Main cast ==
- Richard Briers as Godfrey Spry
- Adrian Edmondson as Gordon Spry
- Imelda Staunton as Muriel Spry
- Barbara Grant as Josie Spry

== Reception ==
The Independent wrote: "It's not really a disaster but there's something decidedly uneven underfoot here, a feeling that this is the working model for a new type of comedy rather than the finished product. [...] while it's sustained with considerable energy by the actors and direction you have to doubt whether it really stands up for one episode, let alone four." Conversely, a retrospective review in The Guardian highlighted the series as "a gem from an era when the BBC took its black comedy seriously", praising both its dark content and humour.

== DVD release ==
If You See God, Tell Him was released on DVD through 2 entertain on 21 July 2008.

== See also ==
British sitcom
