= Denise Coffey =

English actress, director and playwright (1936–2022)

- Born: Denise Dorothy Coffey; 12 December 1936; Aldershot, Hampshire, England
- Died: 24 March 2022 (aged 85); London, England
- Occupations: Actress; comedian; director; playwright

Denise Dorothy Coffey (12 December 1936 – 24 March 2022) was an English actress, comedian, director and playwright.

== Early life ==
Coffey was born in Aldershot on 12 December 1936, the only child of Dorothy (née Malcolm), and her husband, Denis Coffey, an Irishman from Cork and a squadron leader in the Royal Air Force. Coffey was born three months prematurely, weighing just two pounds. She suffered with bronchitis for much of her life. The family moved frequently during the Second World War, though eventually settled in Inverkeithing in Fife, and later in Milesmark outside Dunfermline. She attended Dunfermline High School, and growing up was a big fan of George Bernard Shaw, who influenced her later writing.

== Career ==
After training at the Glasgow College of Dramatic Art (now the Royal Conservatoire of Scotland) she began a career in repertory at the Gateway Theatre in Edinburgh, then moved to the Palladium Theatre there. She appeared in as many as 12 shows a week, many with quick changes.

Coffey created a satire of a radical radio talk show called Scope. The presenter was so impressed that he hired her as an interviewer for the BBC in Edinburgh, where she remained for three years. In the early 1960s she left Scotland behind her, and began working as a character actress in London's West End.

Television audiences first became acquainted with her as the sole female in the late 1960s comedy show Do Not Adjust Your Set, which also featured David Jason and three future Monty Python members: Terry Jones, Michael Palin, and Eric Idle. The producer, Humphrey Barclay, discovered her on stage in 1967 during a performance at the Edinburgh Festival. He was so impressed with her energy that he hired her to work on Do Not Adjust Your Set, which ran from 1967 to 1969. She later appeared in another sketch show, End of Part One, which aired from 1979 to 1980.

In the 1970s she was a member of director Frank Dunlop's repertory company at London's Young Vic Theatre, appearing in several productions including Scapino (1974), and beginning her career as a playwright with some children's shows. She also wrote the children's TV series C.A.B., which was aired in 1986.

She had a few supporting film roles: Sidonia in Waltz of the Toreadors (1962), Peg in Georgy Girl (1966), Soberness in Far from the Madding Crowd (1967), and Mrs E. in Vivian Stanshall's Sir Henry at Rawlinson End (1980). Apart from Do Not Adjust Your Set, her television appearances included the Stanley Baxter series (1968, 1971), Girls About Town (1970–71), Hold the Front Page (1974; which she also created), End of Part One (1979) and The Adventure Game (1980). Coffey played the role of Librarian "Jenny" in the BBC Schools 10 episode Look and Read series Dark Towers (1981).

On radio, Coffey featured in The Wordsmiths at Gorsemere, in the first series of The Burkiss Way and in The Next Programme Follows Almost Immediately, and made guest appearances on several programmes, including I'm Sorry I Haven't a Clue and Just a Minute. She starred with Miriam Margolyes in two series of Alison and Maud (2002–2004). She was also a regular panellist on The Law Game. She consistently refused to appear in commercials, declaring that it was reprehensible to try to persuade people to buy things they did not need.

== Death ==
Coffey died from complications of Alzheimer's disease at Denville Hall, a retirement home for entertainers in Northwood, London, on 24 March 2022, aged 85.

== Selected filmography ==
- Scotland Yard – episode "The Silent Weapon" (1961) – Kennel maid
- Waltz of the Toreadors (1962)
- The Wild and the Willing (1962)
- What a Crazy World (1963)
- Farewell Performance (1963)
- Georgy Girl (1966)
- Far from the Madding Crowd (1967)
- Start the Revolution Without Me (1970)
- Percy (1971)
- Sir Henry at Rawlinson End (1980)
- End of Part One (1980)
- Dark Towers (Look and Read) (1981)
- Another Time, Another Place (1983)
- The Tomorrow People (1992)
- Saving Grace (2000)
