= Last Human =

1995 novel by Doug Naylor

- First edition cover
- Author: Doug Naylor
- Language: English
- Series: Red Dwarf
- Genre: Science fiction
- Publisher: Viking Books
- Publication date: 1995
- Publication place: United Kingdom; United States
- Media type: Print (Paperback & Hardback)
- Preceded by: Better Than Life
- Followed by: Backwards

Last Human is the title of a 1995 science fiction comedy novel written by Doug Naylor. It is part of the Red Dwarf series of novels, based on the popular television show created by Naylor and his partner Rob Grant. Like the other novels, it does not take place within the television series continuity, but instead adapts situations presented on the series to occur within an alternative universe.

The novel focuses on Dave Lister and his crewmates as they attempt to return to their home universe through the myriad of parallel universes that exist, becoming distracted by the search for a lost viral strain promising immortality. It also introduces Kristine Kochanski as a main character. It follows the novel Better Than Life, written by both Naylor and Grant as the writing partnership Grant Naylor.

It contains dialogue and plot elements from the episodes Psirens, Demons and Angels, DNA, Quarantine, Emohawk: Polymorph II, Legion, Camille, and Gunmen of the Apocalypse.

Original elements from the book would later be used in the episode Ouroboros. The character of Kristine Kochanski, as elaborated in this book, is similar to the parallel universe character introduced in the television series in Ouroboros. An audiobook version was released, read by Craig Charles.

== Plot summary ==
=== Cyberia ===
Dave Lister – the last surviving human in the universe – wakes in a transport ship taking him to prison colony Cyberia, the worst place in the universe, having been found guilty of serious crimes against the GELF state and sentenced to the worst imprisonment imaginable, having been hindered by his inability to comprehend the over-complicated legal system of the GELF – and his choice of clothing, including a tie depicting a naked woman in birthing stirrups. After his welcome by the foul and grotesque Snugiraffe, the prison commandant, he is implanted and introduced into the cyber network of Cyberia where he will be forced to live out his life in a hellish dream world of his own creation. Naturally he spends a great deal of time considering where it all went wrong...

=== Time Fork ===
Dave Lister awakes out of Deep Sleep on the transport ship Starbug, disoriented and confused after living the last thirty six years in a backward universe. The mechanoid Kryten welcomes him back; he has been in stasis for twenty years and, not unnaturally, is suffering a spot of amnesia. He meets the rest of the crew, Kristine Kochanski, the Cat, and Rimmer. Kochanski is so happy to see him that she takes him straight to her quarters to make love. Despite still having no memory of her, Lister is caught up in the moment and happily obliges. Rimmer, meanwhile, has been able to procure a solidgram body from a derelict ship for himself allowing him to touch, eat and be three-dimensional again. Rimmer enjoys the new feelings, and spends hours looking at his restored body in a mirror.

On their way through the 'Omni-Zone' – the pathway between the seven parallel realities – back to their home ship Red Dwarf, the crew are surprised to come across a derelict space craft that is the exact duplicate of Starbug. Searching the ship, the crew find the duplicate Cat's disembodied head, Kryten's murdered body with his hand missing and Rimmer's destroyed light bee. They then find the duplicate Kochanski who has been viciously attacked and is barely alive. She makes Lister promise to find his duplicate self before she succumbs to her terrible injuries.

The crew soon find themselves on a GELF populated planet where the duplicate Lister was likely to have headed. Arriving, the crew find that the GELF tribe are sterile and sperm is a highly valued commodity. Of course, Lister and Cat have a 'secret store' and the crew start trading for much needed supplies. Meanwhile, Kryten finds himself in the middle of a huge protest asking the magistrate what happened to the duplicate Lister after learning he was arrested here. The magistrate explains that the duplicate Lister destroyed property and murdered several people including the magistrate. Kryten is confused, as the magistrate is clearly not dead only to learn that mystics predict crimes and the persons involved are arrested before they happen. Kryten suddenly understands what the protest is about and tells the others. Now knowing the duplicate Lister has committed no crime, Lister resolves to find him.

In what is assumed to be a flash-back, Lister arrives in his cyber-hell... and is confused to find himself in what appears to be paradise. He is in a beautiful holiday home, wonderful food and drink are provided and Lister's original fear that his testicles had been detached is untrue. Lister begins to assume that 'hell' is having all his desires catered for leaving him wanting for nothing. Just as he begins settling in, he finds that there's been a mix-up and he's actually in the cyber-hell meant for a hologram named Capote who is allergic to wine and hates the architecture as it reminds him of his ex-wife. Lister is moved to his correct hell, a dank and squalid room where everything is filthy, the alarm clock never stops buzzing and the food is disgusting. Lister admits that he's slept in worse before, and begins his sentence.

The crew are sent to another GELF tribe, the Kinatawowi, to get equipment they need in order to break the duplicate Lister out of Cyberia. Unfortunately, the Kinatawowi aren't sterile which causes offence when Lister and Cat offer their sperm as payment. Eventually, a deal is made; the crew will get a bunch of ramshackle droids and a virus that destroys electricity in return for Lister marrying the chief's daughter. Unfortunately, the bride wants to consummate the union immediately and the crew quickly make a run for it while the GELF promise revenge.

On Cyberia, the attempt to break the duplicate Lister out begins. Although it is mostly successful, the virus causes the prison's artificial gravity to fail. Lister is caught in the floating lake water and drowns, only to be revived by his duplicate self. The two begin their escape from the prison's forces however something doesn't sit right with Lister. His duplicate, after retrieving his belongings, enjoys the fight to an alarming degree and when the two make their getaway in a vehicle the duplicate turns around when he learns that they will outrun them in order to get in some more killing making Lister realise the whole venture has been misguided.

Later, as the two Listers sit around a campfire, the duplicate pulls out the hand of the duplicate Kryten holding a piece of paper from his belongings. Lister realises with horror that the duplicate Lister killed the rest of his crew and manages to knock him out and bind him with rope. However, as Starbug approaches the evil Lister throws himself into the campfire to escape his bonds and attacks. Soon, Starbug has left with the wrong Lister while the other is left buried on the planet.

=== The Rage ===
An Earth long ago, in a universe far away. The Earth World President, John Milhous Nixon has learned that thermonuclear tests conducted too close to the surface of the sun have fatally weakened the star's structure, thus causing an eventual decay that will see the entire solar system die in four hundred thousand years – which will be very bad for the economy, and Nixon's re-election prospects. The only hope is to move the human race to another world in another galaxy; and to that end, a genome has been created that will rewrite DNA and thus turn an inhospitable, barren world into a world where the human race can live. A mission has been organised by Dr. Michael Longman (and his clones, Dr. Longman and Dr. Longman), including numerous GELFs to assist in the process and Michael McGruder, a heroic star soldier who has accepted this mission in the hopes that he may be able to find and contact his father, the long-lost hero of an ill-fated mining ship, revived to be that ship's hologram... Arnold J. Rimmer.

The real Lister, having been rescued from his makeshift grave, is trapped in Cyberia charged with orchestrating the break-out (it is made clear that it was in fact he, and not the alternate Lister, who was the subject of the "Cyberia" section and that the 'flash-back' in "Time Fork" was actually a flash-forward). Having survived his alternate self's assault and attempted murder, he is now trapped in the soul-destroying hell of his own creation, where all the places and people remind him not only of the worst places in his life, but of everything he's lost, stolen by his alternative self – his girlfriend, his ship, his life. After five months of this hell, trapped in a grungy dystopian city surrounded by prostitutes that look like Kochanski, soul-sapping advertisements about his parentless upbringing, endless showings of Chitty Chitty Bang Bang at the cinema and – perhaps worst of all – encyclopedia salesmen, he is brought out of Cyberia and given an offer; to be part of an experimental terraforming and recolonisation program. The inmates bodies will be used to terraform an inhospitable planet into a comfortable environment. All of the inmates on Cyberia are innocent, as only people without any malice or rage are able to be used for this hence people being wrongly arrested on the GELF colony (not knowing that the alternate Lister was actually guilty of murder when he was incarcerated there as they were charging him on smuggling cases where they knew he was innocent). Unable to stand being imprisoned in his personal hell, Lister agrees.

Meanwhile, the crew of Starbug have found that the piece of paper in the duplicate Kryten's hand contained coordinates to a ship where important scientific research has been conducted. As it is a long trip to the ship, the Mayflower, the crew are placed into stasis for the journey. Kryten awakes early, in order to prepare the crew, and notices several disconcerting differences in Lister's medical records. They've got the wrong Lister. And to make matters worse, in his checking of the alternate Starbug's crew records, a cursory examination of the alternative Lister's file reveals that, following a traumatic and abusive upbringing at the hands of his manic-depressive foster mother (as opposed to the kinder, but poorer, foster parents of the proper Lister) had developed into a ruthless, sociopathic criminal.

Before he can digest the alarming news, Kryten is startled by the evil Lister who has also awoken early. Just as he attempts to take out Kryten, a GELF ship sent by Lister's bride attacks. Boarding, the GELF demand what is theirs and the evil Lister tells Kryten to just give them what they want, something which Kryten is more than happy to do. The evil Lister realises too late that this means him, and he is dragged out of the airlock. As Kryten muses on this lucky turn of events he realises that Starbug is on fire. The rest of the crew wake just as Starbug plunges into the lava bed of the planet they were heading for. Before Starbug can burn up, it then ends up in an ocean created by the Mayflower. With Starbug damaged, the crew board the Mayflower and find several hundred vials of diverse viruses including positive ones that bestow luck on the infected for a time. Kochanski, after infecting herself for a short while, manages to find more luck virus as well as other vials that will come in handy. Kryten, meanwhile, finds a DNA machine and turns himself human.

As part of his agreement in volunteering for the terraforming program, Lister is granted the use of a symbi-morph named Reketrebn to fulfil his desires with her shapeshifting and telepathic abilities. Reketrebn is defective, however, and intends to save herself for her boyfriend. Lister isn't interested in using her for romantic purposes and asks her to turn into Kryten so he can get information out of him- Reketrebn essentially manifesting as Kryten to give Lister confirmation of his own theories based on information he has subconsciously processed and deduced, such as subconsciously overhearing a conversation about symbi-morphs in a bar and subconsciously deducing that Rimmer was Kochanski's lover in this reality rather than his evil self- before having her turn into him so she can feel the pain he feels from losing Kochanski to his evil self. After this, Reketrebn agrees to help Lister, but their attempt to escape results in them arriving on the same ship that would have taken them to the terraforming project, save that they are now in the control cabin rather than the stasis chambers.

On the planet, Lister meets Michael McGruder who was kept in deep sleep aboard the Mayflower. McGruder tells Lister that he wants to meet his hero, Rimmer, who is also his father. Thinking he will never see Rimmer again, Lister doesn't correct him. He then learns of a powerful force known as 'The Rage' created by the feelings of fury from the wrongly convicted inmates. To prevent it from killing everyone, the inmates form a circle and The Rage will move between them before choosing one person to inhabit for a few seconds, killing them. Lister joins the circle, and for the time he is consumed with The Rage all his dark feelings are brought to the fore and Lister begs it to consume him. However, it chooses another and kills him before leaving.

Kryten initially revels in his humanity, but quickly grows disenchanted with the experience and decides to turn back. Doing so is easier said than done as Longman, having used the DNA machine too many times leaving him barely human, has stolen the mechanoid data. Thanks to the luck virus, Kochanski defeats Longman and Kryten is restored to his regular form. The crew then use the luck virus to find the coordinates of the planet where Lister is and head there.

Reaching the planet, Lister is reunited with the rest of the crew and McGruder finally meets his father but is devastated when told he is hardly a hero but a maintenance technician. Starbug loses power once it lands, and the planet will soon be passing through the Omni-Zone into another universe where it will be allowed to thrive. Rimmer walks through a cave when he finds Michael being attacked by the evil Lister. His confusion about how the evil Lister made it there despite being removed by the Kinatowowi is put on hold, when suddenly the radiation gun the evil Lister possesses drops close to him. However Rimmer can't pluck up the courage to grab it, and the evil Lister throws imprisons him in the hold aboard Starbug with Kryten, who found the dead bodies of the four Kinatowowi who boarded earlier (the evil Lister had never left the ship, having killed his escorts before going into hiding to heal from the wounds they inflicted on him). The evil Lister emerges from the ship and locates the rest of the crew demanding the solar-powered escape pod to allow him to leave the planet. As well as this, he shoots Lister in the genitals with the radiation gun rendering him sterile. Meanwhile, The Rage is approaching again.

Aboard Starbug, Kryten comes up with a plan to escape the ship using Rimmer's light bee. Although Rimmer is hesitant due to the chance the bee could be destroyed, he talks himself round and agrees to take the risk. The gambit works, and the two escape the ship. The Rage is near, however the crew come up with a plan to kill The Rage by infecting it with the same virus that was used to break into Cyberia. Kryten plans to infect it by throwing himself into The Rage, despite the fact that he won't come back. However the evil Lister attacks again, but Rimmer bravely comes forward to defend his shipmates wearing a jet-pack. McGruder is proud to see his father acting with courage, and Rimmer starts to enjoy himself feeling his neuroses slipping away. Unfortunately, this comes to a premature end when the evil Lister shoots Rimmer's light bee causing Rimmer to deactivate and the heavily damaged bee falls to the ground.

The Rage is nearly upon everyone, and there's no time left to infect it with the virus. Everyone forms the circle required to prevent The Rage from killing everyone, however Lister warns that one of them will still die. The evil Lister doesn't intend for it to be him, and infects himself with the luck virus. The Rage hits, and everyone begs for it to possess them. However, thanks to the positive virus, the evil Lister is the one who is 'lucky' enough to get his wish to have The Rage consume him. He takes on the full force of the entity, which finally kills him leaving only his bones behind.

Even though The Rage has passed, it must still be destroyed before the planet passes through the Omni-Zone. Suddenly Rimmer's light bee, hovering using the last of its power, uses morse code to communicate with the crew and offer to take the virus and infect The Rage with it. After saying a final goodbye to his son, who now knows that while Rimmer may not have been the hero he was raised to believe in he is still a man to be proud of, the light bee flies into The Rage and infects it with the virus stopping its destruction and allowing the souls of the inmates who created it to rest in peace.

The planet starts to pass through the Omni-Zone, and the remaining crew take shelter in the caves for three weeks as the planet is pounded by storms. Emerging, everyone finds a pleasant, hospitable world growing, waiting for them. As Kryten, Cat, McGruder and Reketrebn leave to search for Rimmer's light bee in order to give him a funeral, Lister and Kochanski stare over the world. Lister sadly comments that this would be the ideal place to raise a family and help to restart the human race – a dream now impossible thanks to his alternate self. Kochanski tells him that all hope shouldn't be lost, as he could still father children if he's very lucky... and Kochanski still has some of the luck virus. Taking it, Lister and Kochanski head into the grass and get to work.

== Continuity ==
Following publication of Last Human, Rob Grant also wrote a solo Red Dwarf novel, entitled Backwards. Although it also follows on from the previous novel Better Than Life, Backwards does not refer to any of the events of Last Human, and in fact includes notable differences (such as the fact that Kochanski does not appear as a character). As a result, both novels are generally considered to occur in alternative realities to each other. While the continuity of the books is more consistent than that of the series, it is not flawless. In the first novel, Arnold Rimmer is introduced as a First Technician, rather than a Second Technician as in the series; but in this novel, he tells his son Michael McGruder, that he was a Second Technician aboard Red Dwarf.

== Audiobook ==
The abridged version of the Audiobook for Last Human skips over some scenes present in the book. The character of Dr. Michael Longman is completely absent and therefore the plot elements he introduces are not included.
