= Quanderhorn =

- Other names: The Quanderhorn Xperimentations; Quanderhorn 2
- Genre: Comic science fiction
- Running time: 30 minutes approx.
- Country of origin: United Kingdom
- Language(s): English
- Home station: BBC Radio 4
- Syndicates: BBC Radio 4 Extra
- Starring: James Fleet; Ryan Sampson; Cassie Layton; Kevin Eldon; Freddie Fox; John Sessions
- Created by: Rob Grant; Andrew Marshall
- Written by: Rob Grant; Andrew Marshall
- Produced by: Rob Grant; Gordon Kennedy
- Original release: 25 June 2018
- No. of series: 2
- No. of episodes: 12
- Audio format: Stereo, surround
- Website: www.bbc.co.uk/programmes/b0b8cx2z

Quanderhorn (titled The Quanderhorn Xperimentations for series 1 and Quanderhorn 2 for the second series) is a science fiction comedy radio series written by Andrew Marshall and Rob Grant. The first series was originally broadcast in the United Kingdom by BBC Radio 4 in 2018, and a second in 2020. The series has elements that pastiche Nigel Kneale's Professor Bernard Quatermass.

== Plot ==
The series follows the adventures of Professor Darius Quanderhorn, a brilliant, but insane, scientific genius who creates fantastic devices, and has assembled a team of assistants, including his part-insect "son", a recovering amnesiac, a brilliant scientist with a half-clockwork brain, and a captured Martian hostage. The year is 1952, but no one seems to have noticed that it has been that year for the past 65 years. In spite of Quanderhorn saving the world many times, the British government are tired of his eccentric behaviour, and have a mole in his team.

== Cast ==
- James Fleet as Professor Darius Quanderhorn
- Ryan Sampson as Brian Nylon
- Cassie Layton as Dr Gemini Jannussen
- Kevin Eldon as Guuuurk
- Freddie Fox as Troy Quanderhorn
- John Sessions as Winston Churchill and Jenkins
- Rachel Atkins as Dolores and the Synthetic Voice

== Episode list ==
=== Series 1 ===
1. It's Eating My Face
2. Mummy! My Donkey's Head Is Exploding
3. A Little Thing Like Chocolate Gates Can't Stop Us
4. The Splattered Remains of Undentifiable Organs Incident All Over Again
5. Fear! Terror! Gut-wrenching Horror! Arg Arg. Please!
6. Dah dah dah dah dah dahh Dah dah dah dah dahhhh...

=== Series 2 ===
1. Killdiboos and Universibold Explodibangbang
2. Shoveleth in More Hazelnuts!
3. Wasp
4. I Didn't Say it was Well Cloaked
5. Am I Actually the Other Half of Gemma Emma Emma?
6. I Heregy Thind You Guilky

== In other media ==
=== Books ===
Andrew Marshall and Rob Grant also created a novel based on series one entitled The Quanderhorn Xperimentations, released in 2019 by Gollancz Publishers.
