= Better Than Life =

1990 novel by Grant Naylor

- Author: Rob Grant & Doug Naylor
- Publication date: 1990
- Media type: Print (Paperback & Hardback)
- Pages: 224 pp (first edition, hardback)
- ISBN: 0-67-083547-1 (first edition, hardback)
- OCLC: 22182967
- Dewey Decimal: 823.914 20
- LC Class: PR6064.A935 B47 1990
- Preceded by: Red Dwarf: Infinity Welcomes Careful Drivers
- Followed by: Last Human

Better Than Life is a science fiction comedy novel by Grant Naylor, the collective name for Rob Grant and Doug Naylor, co-creators and writers of the Red Dwarf television series, on which the novel is based. The main plotline was developed and expanded from the Red Dwarf episode of the same name, as well as the Series 3 and 4 episodes: White Hole, Marooned, Polymorph, and Backwards.

The book, first published 1990, is a sequel to Red Dwarf: Infinity Welcomes Careful Drivers, and was the first Red Dwarf novel to receive its first print run in hardback edition. Like the first novel, Better Than Life became a best seller and was reproduced in paperback, omnibus and audiobook versions. Two further novels, Last Human and Backwards, were each created as alternate sequels by the writers, and followed in 1995 and 1996 respectively.

== Plot ==
Following-on from where Infinity Welcomes Careful Drivers let-off, Lister, Rimmer and the Cat have discovered a cache of 'Better Than Life' headbands in one of the sleeping quarters. They fantasize that they board the Nova 5 and use its Duality Jump drive to return to Earth.

The messages on his arm cause Lister to realize that he is in the game, and he confronts Rimmer. They travel to Denmark and meet with the Cat. While discussing how to get out, Kryten arrives and explains how they started playing, and to leave they need only want to leave, but their subsequent attempts to escape fail because the game lures them in.

All four live out their ideal fantasies until Rimmer's massive self-loathing causes his subconscious to rear its ugly head and rebel, which had built up his life only so that it can bring him down later. His company crashes obliterating him financially on the day of his wedding; his ex who has taken up with his brother walks back into his life on the same day, and although she was a complete sociopath during their previous relationship, he is unable to resist his lust and elopes with her.

During their escape the two are caught by a bailiff who repossesses Rimmer's body, as although he previously had had wealth beyond compare, for tax reasons it had saved a few dollar-pounds to hire it. As purely a sound wave he is sent to prison unable to do anything other than bounce off the soundproof padded walls. Following a prison break with his cell mates, he ends up trapped with a pair of violent criminals and transferred into the body of a female prostitute.

Subject to their misogynistic views, Rimmer starts to regret some of his own attitudes to women in the past. He fears for his own safety as he would be unable to defend himself, trapped as he is in the body of a woman, against a man and so submits no matter how humiliated he becomes.

After their supply of cash has run out Rimmer is forced to go on the game. Following a confrontation with a vying customer, Rimmer remembers how Kryten explained that in order to escape the game, one has to want to escape and that an archway would appear to exit through. Incapacitating the would be customer, Rimmer makes a break for it visualizing the exit. Reaching the archway a mere yard ahead of one of the violent criminals who had been acting as pimp, he passes through, only to bounce back again to be accosted by the violent criminal. Fortunately there is a cop present who has witnesses the scene, and, gun drawn and stood prone behind the hood of his car, tells the would be pimp to leave the lady alone. The violent criminal reaches for his gun, but the cop reacts quicker, shooting him dead.

Rimmer, reassessing the situation realises that since Cat, Kryten, Lister, and himself all joined at the same time, they would have to want to leave at the same time in order to be able to quit the Better than Life game. So he sets off to find them. One by one as he catches up with them, his subconscious wreaks havoc on their idealised fantasy lives until eventually they all want to escape; Rimmer's arrival in Bedford Falls (Lister's hometown based on the setting of his favourite film, It's A Wonderful Life) via juggernaut destroys the town and prompts his wife Kristine to leave him and take their twin boys with her.

Once back in the real world, Rimmer and Kryten leave Lister and Cat in the infirmary to recuperate, the two near-starved and suffering from extreme muscle atrophy after almost two years of near-inactivity while in the Game. The crew learn that ship's computer Holly has shut himself down, as a miscalculation in an experiment to cure his computer senility and restore his original IQ of 6,000 actually increased his IQ to over 12,000 but exponentially reduced his lifespan to only a few minutes.

With the ship running on emergency backup power and the engines shutdown, Rimmer and Kryten attempt to discover why the ship was in such a dire condition. They power on Holly who after a few seconds of confusion switches himself back off, repeating this a few times they eventually place a shutdown override to prevent Holly turning himself off, and Rimmer, after some initial confusion finally understands why all the systems were powered down, and urgently orders Kryten to remove the shutdown override, unfortunately Kryten is distracted by something on the sci-scanner, which leads to further delays before Holly is able to power down, with a drastically reduced remaining run time.

Kryten, not wanting to be too presumptuous, allows Rimmer to look into the sci-scanner, before explaining that there is a planet on course to impact the Red Dwarf ship, which without the engines online would be unable to manoeuvrer out of the way. Following on from some quick calculation in which Rimmer learns the planet will hit in about three weeks, they plan to turn the engines back on, which will also take about three weeks.

The work to reactivate the engines progresses ahead of schedule until Rimmer makes a catastrophic mismanagement decision, which leads to several teams of scutters being crushed meaning they do not have enough workers to complete the task.

With only 12 hours left till impact, Rimmer and Kryten decide to flee with Cat and Lister in one of the Starbugs. As a final gesture they decide to explain the situation to Holly and to leave him switched on to enjoy his remaining run time. Luckily, since Holly still has an IQ of 12,000 he is able to come up with a plan to explosively knock the planet out of the way.

Lister, having been an amateur snooker player decides to ignore Holly's calculations with general acceptance from Cat and Kryten in order to pull off a trick shot; however, this backfires when the Starbug shuttle unexpectedly ends up on a collision course and crash-lands on a drifting ice planet, trapping Rimmer and Lister. Rimmer is returned to Red Dwarf when his remote projection unit reaches beyond the range of Red Dwarf, but cannot send help for Lister as the ship has become trapped in the event horizon of a black hole. Back on the planet, Lister realises that he has arrived on Earth, which was sent drifting out of orbit after it became the solar system's garbage dump, Lister becoming the 'king' of the mutated giant cockroaches that are the planet's only remaining life.

Back on the Dwarf, the crew are able to escape as Holly told the Toaster how to get out of a black hole before he shut himself down. Unfortunately, when the Dwarfers finally go to rescue Lister – with Rimmer and the Cat in one ship and Kryten and the Toaster in the other – Rimmer and the Cat are shocked to find a beautiful farm amidst the garbage, tended by an old Lister. Because of the time dilation of the black hole, thirty-four years have passed on the planet. A shape-shifting, emotion-stealing mutant known as a polymorph is able to sneak on board the ship, draining Lister of his fear, Cat of his confidence, Kryten of his guilt and Rimmer of his rage. Eventually the emotionally handicapped crew are able to defeat the Polymorph, but the abrupt restoration of his fear causes Lister to die of a heart attack. Rather than burying Lister, they take him to Universe 3, where time runs backwards.

Lister returns to life on a version of Earth where time runs backwards. He recovers from his heart attack, regurgitates lunch, and is forced to take a wallet and watch from a mugger. A message from the Dwarf crew instructs Lister to meet them in thirty-six years (they cannot stay with him or they would have gotten younger). Lister takes a taxi to his new home and finds an elderly Kochanski waiting for him. Lister is happy, knowing that he and Kochanski have many years behind them to look forward to.

== Other versions ==
- New edition

The new paperback edition was released in April 1991 by Penguin Books Ltd.

- Red Dwarf Omnibus

Released in November 1992 by Penguin Books, the Omnibus contains the novels Red Dwarf: Infinity Welcomes Careful Drivers and its sequel Better than Life together in one volume, both of which are slightly corrected and/or expanded. In addition, the omnibus also includes a jokey reproduction of the text that appeared on the infamous beer mat that the premise for the series was originally written on, a script for an episode of Dave Hollins: Space Cadet, and the original script of the pilot episode "The End".

- Better Than Life (Audiobook)

Unabridged and abridged audiobooks, read by regular cast member Chris Barrie (who plays Arnold Rimmer in the series) were released by Laughing Stock Production in December 1996. Originally released on cassette, digital filesets of the audiobook now circulate.

  - The abridged version of the book – along with Infinity Welcomes Careful Drivers – was broadcast as the Red Dwarf Radio Show, a 24-part series on the BBC World Service in 1995, with repeats on what is now BBC Radio 4 Extra.

== Sequels ==
Rob Grant and Doug Naylor began collaborating on a sequel under the title The Last Human. During the writing of the novel, the two decided to split their partnership, Grant Naylor Productions. Still contracted to write two more Red Dwarf novels, they decided to each write one. For his novel, Doug Naylor renamed it Last Human and set it onboard Starbug featuring Kristine Kochanski as a new crewmember. Grant's Red Dwarf novel, Backwards, released in 1996, would be a direct sequel to the ending of Better Than Life with the beginning consisting of the crew waiting for Lister at Niagara Falls.

== See also ==
- Red Dwarf
- Simulated reality
