= David Renwick =

English TV producer and director

- Born: David Peter Renwick; 4 September 1951 (age 75); Luton, Bedfordshire, England
- Education: Luton Grammar School, Bedfordshire
- Occupations: Screenwriter, director, producer, author
- Spouse: Eleanor Hogarth (m. 1994)
- Writing career
- Period: 1974–present
- Genre: Television
- Subjects: Crime, drama, mystery, comedy
- Notable works: One Foot in the Grave (1990–2001); Jonathan Creek (1997–2016)

David Peter Renwick (REN-wick; born 4 September 1951) is an English retired author, television writer, director and executive producer. He created the sitcom One Foot in the Grave and the mystery comedy crime drama series Jonathan Creek. He was awarded the Writers Guild Ronnie Barker Award at the 2008 British Comedy Awards.

== Early life ==
Renwick was born as the only child of James George Renwick and Winifred May Smith, who were married in 1948, and brought up in Luton, Bedfordshire, England. He was educated through to sixth form level at Luton Grammar School, a former state grammar school. The school became known as Luton Sixth Form College while he was still a pupil. He studied journalism at Harlow Technical College.

== Career ==
=== 1970s ===
Before becoming a comedy writer, Renwick worked as a journalist, reporter and sub-editor on his home town newspaper, the Luton News.

On beginning his comedy writing career in the mid-1970s Renwick initially submitted material for BBC radio comedies including Week Ending and The News Huddlines. He also contributed to other radio series such as Oh, Get On With It! starring Kenneth Williams and with David McKellar co-wrote Harry Worth in Things Could Be Worse featuring Harry Worth.

Teaming up with writing partner Andrew Marshall, they wrote the BBC Radio 4 comedy series The Burkiss Way and provided sketches for BBC television shows such as The Two Ronnies and Not the Nine O'Clock News during the late 1970s and early '80s. One of the most celebrated sketches he wrote for The Two Ronnies was a parody of the BBC quiz programme Mastermind, where a "Charlie Smithers" chose to answer questions on the specialist subject "Answering the question before last", adapted from his "Answering one question behind all the time" sketch from The Burkiss Way. Their short-lived LWT series for ITV, End of Part One, was an attempt to transfer Burkiss-style humour to television.

Renwick also wrote for Les Dawson, Bernie Winters, and Little and Large at the end of the 1970s.

=== 1980s ===
In 1982, Renwick and Marshall penned the comedy drama serial Whoops Apocalypse for LWT, based on the insanity of international politics in the age of nuclear weapons, and four years later they adapted the screenplay (changing most of the characters and situations completely) into a feature film version. In 1983 they wrote The Steam Video Company for Thames Television, a short comedy series consisting of absurd parodies of famous novels. This was followed in 1986 by Hot Metal for LWT, a six-part satire of the tabloid newspaper industry starring Robert Hardy, Geoffrey Palmer and John Gordon Sinclair. The show was a critical success and returned for a further six episodes in 1988 with a revised cast of Robert Hardy, Richard Wilson and Caroline Milmoe.

Renwick also wrote for the sketch show Alexei Sayle's Stuff and Spike Milligan's There's a Lot of It About.

Renwick began writing solo at the end of the 1980s when he created the sitcom One Foot in the Grave, starring Richard Wilson, which was highly successful.

=== 1990s ===
One Foot in the Grave went on to be a popular hit for an entire decade. It also ran for four seasons as an American remake titled Cosby, starring Bill Cosby, although this is generally regarded as a very loose adaptation of the original. The series won a BAFTA award for best comedy programme in 1992, with Renwick receiving The Writers' Guild Award for Best Comedy Writer in that same year.

Renwick switched to writing drama in 1990 and 1991 to indulge his love of detective stories and dramatise four episodes (one being co-written) for the series Agatha Christie's Poirot (ITV, 1989–2002), featuring David Suchet as the Belgian sleuth. In 1992, Renwick and co-writer Michael Baker received an Edgar Award from the Mystery Writers of America for the Poirot episode "The Lost Mine", which aired in the US as part of the PBS anthology series Mystery!

In 1993, Renwick wrote, back with Marshall again, the four-part comedy miniseries If You See God, Tell Him which starred Imelda Staunton, Adrian Edmondson and Richard Briers, with a brief appearance from Angus Deayton. Several other minor roles also went to actors with whom Renwick worked on One Foot in the Grave.

In 1997, Renwick devised the comedy-drama and mystery series, Jonathan Creek, in which the eponymous designer of magic tricks, played by comedian Alan Davies, applied his cleverness to the solving of crimes. This series also became successful.

In 1999, Renwick received BAFTA's Dennis Potter Award, established to recognise outstanding writing for television.

=== 2000s ===
Another comedy-drama Renwick has penned, Love Soup, starring Tamsin Greig and Michael Landes, premiered on BBC One on 27 September 2005. Renwick, and his former writing partner Marshall, had cameo roles in an episode of the series as members of a television sitcom scriptwriting team.

On 3 December 2007, BBC Four broadcast David Renwick Night, a themed evening of programmes written by or about the screenwriter.

In 2008, Renwick directed for the first time as he brought back the series Jonathan Creek after a five year hiatus. The episode, The Grinning Man, was almost two hours long and was broadcast on New Year's Day 2009.

Renwick was awarded the Writers Guild Ronnie Barker Award at the British Comedy Awards 2008.

=== 2010s ===
In 2010, Renwick directed a further episode of his series Jonathan Creek, with the 94-minute long instalment The Judas Tree being broadcast on Easter Sunday.

In 2012, Renwick developed a series called Ergo for ITV, which was to star Robert Webb as a man living with his stepmother following the death of his father. "It was a domestic comedy, my attempt to do something like One Foot in the Grave in the country really," said Renwick. However, Renwick and ITV encountered creative differences and the project was not produced.

Renwick wrote a further five episodes of Jonathan Creek, the last of which to date was broadcast in December 2016. As of 2026, thirty-two episodes have been produced across five short-run series and six specials. The slow rate of production is partly due to Renwick's writing of the episodes, which he describes as being a painstaking process in which the intricacies of the plots take several months to work out. It is not known whether the series will return.

In 2016, Renwick wrote the four-part radio miniseries Desolation Jests. The show, starring David Jason, John Bird, Jan Ravens and Rory Bremner, was broadcast on BBC Radio 4 from 13 December 2016 until 3 January 2017. The miniseries was repeated on BBC Radio 4 Extra in 2022.

== Personal life ==
In 1994, Renwick married Eleanor Hogarth in Luton. The couple reside between Pavenham and Stevington in northern Bedfordshire.

== Books ==
Renwick is also an author, having written the novels One Foot in the Grave (1992) and One Foot in the Grave and Counting (2021) – both featuring original plots, as well as ones reworked from the television series.

In June 2026, a Jonathan Creek play script entitled The Fantom of the Acropolis, which Renwick wrote a few years previously but was never produced, was published by Idiot Box Books.

== Selected filmography ==
=== Acting credits ===
- Hot Metal (1989)
- One Foot in the Grave (1993–2000)
- Jonathan Creek (2003–2016)
- Love Soup (2005–2008)

=== Writing credits ===
==== Radio ====
- The Burkiss Way (1976–1980)
- Desolation Jests (2016–2017)

==== Theatre ====
- Angry Old Men (1994)

==== Television and film ====
- The Two Ronnies (1975–1987)
- Took and Co. (1977)
- Bernie (1978)
- The Little and Large Show (1978)
- The Les Dawson Show (1978)
- End of Part One (1979–1980)
- The Dick Emery Show (1980)
- Not the Nine O'Clock News (1980)
- Russ Abbot's Saturday Madhouse (1980)
- Janet and Company (1980–1981)
- Nice to See You! (1981)
- There's a Lot of It About (1982)
- 3-2-1 (1982)
- Whoops Apocalypse (1982)
- The Jim Davidson Show (1982)
- Yarwood in Town (1982)
- The Steam Video Company (1984)
- Assaulted Nuts (1985)
- The Funny Side (1985)
- Hot Metal (1986–1989)
- The Kenny Everett Television Show (1986–1998)
- Slinger's Day (1987)
- Fast Forward (1987)
- Alexei Sayle's Stuff (1988–1991)
- Wilt (1989)
- Poirot (1990–1991)
- One Foot in the Grave (1990–2001)
- If You See God, Tell Him (1993)
- Cosby (1996–2000)
- Jonathan Creek (1997–2016)
- The Ben Elton Show (1998)
- Love Soup (2005–2008)

=== Executive producer ===
- Cosby (1996–2000)
- Jonathan Creek (1997–2016)
- Love Soup (2005–2008)

=== Director ===
- Jonathan Creek (2009–2013)

== Regular collaborators ==
Renwick has often been heavily involved in the casting of actors for his productions and has chosen to work with numerous actors across several of his productions even for the casting of smaller roles.

Actors Annette Crosbie, Peter Copley, Jonathan Kydd, John Bluthal, Brian Murphy, Hannah Gordon and Nick Maloney have all made appearances in Jonathan Creek as well as in One Foot in The Grave.

John Bird has appeared in One Foot in The Grave, Jonathan Creek as well as the radio series Desolation Jests.

Tamsin Greig, Georgie Glen, Sheridan Smith and Sara Markland all worked with Renwick on his sitcom Love Soup as well as making appearances in Jonathan Creek.

Adrian Edmondson had a leading role in Renwick's 1993 miniseries If You See God, Tell Him and made appearances in Jonathan Creek. James Saxon also appeared in both productions.

Joanna Bacon, Enn Reitel, Owen Brenman, Damaris Hayman, Angus Deayton, Paul Merton, Katharine Page, Tony Millan and Bill Gavin all appeared in both One Foot in the Grave and If You See God, Tell Him.

Jan Ravens appeared in Love Soup, One Foot in the Grave, If You See God Tell Him and also in Renwick's radio series Desolation Jests.

Doreen Mantle appeared in eighteen episodes of One Foot in the Grave, one episode of Love Soup, as well as one episode of Jonathan Creek, whilst Renwick himself made occasional, brief appearances in these three productions.
