= Andrew Marshall (screenwriter) =

British screenwriter (born 1954)

- Born: Andrew Paul Marshall; 27 August 1954 (age 71); Lowestoft, Suffolk, England
- Occupation: Screenwriter
- Writing career
- Genre: Television
- Subject: Sitcom
- Notable works: 2point4 Children (1991–1999); Dad (1997–1999); Hot Metal (1986–1988)

Andrew Paul Marshall (born 27 August 1954) is a British comedy screenwriter, most noted for the domestic sitcom 2point4 children. He had previously adapted stories for Agatha Christie's Poirot, and in 2002 he made a further move into writing "straight" drama, with the fantasy horror series Strange. He has also written several screenplays.

== Career ==
Born in Lowestoft, Marshall attended Fen Park School and then Lowestoft Grammar School, and afterwards Borough Road College where he studied mathematics and psychology. Around the same time, he worked regularly on Radio 4's Week Ending, together with David Renwick, Douglas Adams, Alistair Beaton, John Lloyd, Simon Brett and others. Shortly afterwards he began writing The Burkiss Way with David Renwick and John Mason (who later dropped out to go to acting school). Renwick and Marshall remained scriptwriting partners for many years.

Brought by Humphrey Barclay to London Weekend Television, originally to repeat his 'nursery slopes comedy' Do Not Adjust Your Set with End of Part One, Marshall and Renwick went on to write a series of television satires, including Whoops Apocalypse, Hot Metal and If You See God, Tell Him — the latter originally for Channel 4, but postponed for several years when the channel refused to let them direct it, and finally ending up at the BBC later.

They also experimented with a type of neo-Vaudeville style in The Steam Video Company for Thames Television, ultimately ending up at the BBC, writing, with Alexei Sayle, Alexei Sayle's Stuff. Along the way they also wrote the screenplay for a film version of Whoops Apocalypse and adapted Tom Sharpe's novel Wilt for a film of the same title.

After a tentative and unsuccessful attempt at solo writing with Sob Sisters at Central Television, Marshall found long-lasting success BBC One's 2point4 children, adding to it Health and Efficiency and later, Dad. He also found time to adapt Alexei Sayle's short story "Lose Weight, Ask Me How" for the series Spinechillers, in which Sayle also starred.

Having also contributed to Agatha Christie's Poirot on ITV, he next wrote drama with the telefantasy series Strange for Saturday nights on BBC One. However, due to scheduling issues, a one-year gap between the pilot episode and the series and the BBC's decision not to repeat the pilot before the series began, the series failed to find a large audience in its Saturday night slot and was not recommissioned for a second run.

For many years Marshall avoided publicity of any kind, explaining that "it's very bad for you" and cited his major influences as "Alfred Hitchcock and Walt Disney... which explains a lot." In 2005, he had a small cameo appearance on-screen in an episode of David Renwick's comedy-drama Love Soup on BBC One, alongside Renwick himself, as members of a sitcom script-writing team. He also appeared as a member of the critics panel on several editions of BBC 7's "Serious About Comedy" in 2006–7.

He later began a new collaboration with Rob Grant, co-creator of the TV show Red Dwarf, producing directing and writing the Radio 4 series The Quanderhorn Xperimentations, as well as the novel version published by Gollancz. He and Grant launched a Radio 4 sketch series "The Nether Regions" as writer/performers in October 2019.

In February 2026, it was announced that a Red Dwarf prequel titled Red Dwarf: Titan would be released in July 2026 by Gollancz, written by Rob Grant and Marshall.

== Screenography ==
=== With David Renwick ===
- The Burkiss Way (BBC Radio 4)
- End of Part One (London Weekend Television for ITV)
- Whoops Apocalypse (London Weekend Television for ITV)
- Whoops Apocalypse (movie version)
- The Steam Video Company (Thames Television for ITV)
- Alexei Sayle's Stuff (BBC) - also with Alexei Sayle
- There's a Lot of It About (BBC) - also with Spike Milligan
- If You See God, Tell Him (BBC)
- Hot Metal (LWT)
- Wilt

=== With John Lloyd ===
- Hordes of the Things (BBC Radio 4)

=== With Rob Grant ===
- The Quanderhorn Xperimentations (BBC Radio 4) and Gollancz
- The Nether Regions (BBC Radio 4)

=== Solo ===
- Sob Sisters (ITV)
- 2point4 children (BBC)
- Strange (BBC)
- Dad (BBC)
- Health and Efficiency (BBC)
- Poirot: The Victory Ball; How Does Your Garden Grow? (LWT)
