= 2point4 Children =

British TV sitcom (1991–1999)

- Title card, used for Series 8.
- Genre: Sitcom
- Created by: Andrew Marshall
- Written by: Andrew Marshall, Paul Smith, Paul Alexander and Simon Braithwaite
- Directed by: Richard Boden (Series 1-5); Nick Wood (Series 6-7); Dewi Humphreys (Series 8)
- Starring: Belinda Lang; Gary Olsen; Julia Hills; Clare Woodgate (Series 1 and 2); Clare Buckfield (Series 3-8); John Pickard
- Theme music composer: Howard Goodall
- Country of origin: United Kingdom
- Original language: English
- No. of series: 8
- No. of episodes: 56 (list of episodes)

Production
- Producer: Richard Boden
- Camera setup: Video; Multiple camera
- Running time: 30 minutes
- Production company: BBC Television

Original release
- Network: BBC One
- Release: 3 September 1991 – 30 December 1999

2point4 Children is a BBC Television sitcom that was created by Andrew Marshall. It follows the lives of the Porters, a seemingly average, working-class London family whose world is frequently turned upside-down by bad luck and bizarre occurrences.

The show was originally broadcast on BBC One from 1991 to 1999, and ran for eight series, concluding on 30 December 1999 with the special episode "The Millennium Experience". The show is regularly repeated in the UK. In Australia showings are on BBC UKTV. The name of the show comes from the stereotypical average size of a typical nuclear family in the UK at the time of the writing of the first series.

The show regularly picked up audiences of up to 14 million throughout the 1990s, with an average of between 6 and 9 million. The final episode was viewed by 9.03 million people.

Lead actor Gary Olsen died in 2000, effectively ruling out a return of the show for any further series.

== Plot summary ==
The Porters are a working-class family who live in Chiswick, London who at first seem normal enough. Bill is the sensible, level-headed mother who does the cooking and housework whilst working for a bakery with her highly sexed best friend Rona. Ben is the father, who is often just as immature as the children. He runs a heating repair business with his moody and sarcastic assistant Christine.

Jenny, the teenage daughter, is moody and interested in boys, music and vegetarianism; her younger brother David is mischievous and enjoys horror films, aliens and annoying his sister.

However, the Porters' world is frequently upended by bizarre occurrences and bad luck. Whether it is dealing with flatulent dogs, a frozen body in a freezer in the front room, or even stumbling across a warehouse filled with Shirley Bassey's cast-off ballgowns, anything seems possible in the Porters' world. Traditionally Christmas episodes would feature characters collectively performing a musical number.

== Cast ==
=== Main characters ===
- Belinda Lang as Wilhelmina "Bill" Porter
- Gary Olsen as Ben Porter
- Clare Woodgate (series 1 and 2) and Clare Buckfield (series 3 onward) as Jenny Porter
- John Pickard as David Porter
- Julia Hills as Rona Harris
- Kim Benson as Christine Atkins

=== Supporting characters ===
- Liz Smith as both Bette and Aunt Belle, Bill's mother and her twin sister
- Annette Kerr as Dora Grimes, the Porter family's neighbour
- Patricia Brake (series 1) and Sandra Dickinson (series 2 onward) as Tina Porter, Ben's sister
- Leonard O'Malley (series 1) as Gerry
- Andrew Hall (series 2) as Gordon, Rona's fiancé
- Barbara Lott (series 2 to 6) as Auntie Pearl, Rona's biological mother
- Roger Lloyd-Pack (series 3 to 6) as Jake "The Klingon" Klinger, Ben's business rival
- Tom Roberts (series 3 onwards) as Tony, Rona's DJ boyfriend
- Nathan Valente (series 4 to 7) as Clive, Jenny's boyfriend
- Arbel Jones (series 4 to 6) as Laura, Clive's mother
- Mitchell Ray (series 7) and Alex Kew (series 8) as Declan, a homeless boy fostered by the Porters

=== Guest appearances ===
- Annette Badland as Dawn
- Ed Bishop as Chet
- Owen Brenman as a yuppy
- Dominic Brunt as a petrol station attendant
- Patsy Byrne as Peggy
- Peter Cartwright as an auctioneer
- Mark Charnock as Duane
- Nathan Constance
- Windsor Davies as Uncle Lon, Ben's uncle
- Sharon Duncan-Brewster as Maureen
- Richard Durden as John Crudaal
- Idris Elba as a parachute instructor
- Jeremy Hawk as Fletcher
- Don Henderson as Frank Porter, Ben and Tina's father
- David Kelly as Paddy
- James Lance as Keith
- Stephen Lewis as a driving instructor
- Victor McGuire as Doctor Brook
- Ursula Mohan as a market researcher
- Deborah Norton as Martha Christie
- Julie Peasgood as Pauline
- Anneka Rice as herself
- Michael Troughton as Mr Barstow
- Nina Wadia as Sharma
- Danny Webb as Malcolm
- Tessa Wyatt as Carol

== Episodes ==
The show originally ran from 1991 to 1999. 56 episodes were made over eight series, including six Christmas specials in which the cast performed carols or original theme songs. Although the series was made over the course of eight years, the show's in-universe timeline appears to be much shorter, with Jenny Porter stated to be 14 in series one, yet only just starting university at age 18 in the final series.

Andrew Marshall wrote all of the episodes, except for three in series seven which were written by Paul Alexander, Simon Braithwaite and Paul Smith.

== Reception ==
2point4 Children was met with mixed to positive reviews. In a 1994 article for The Independent, Jim White is critical of Andrew Marshall's scriptwriting saying that Marshall "[...] appears to labour under the belief that by grafting a few stock comedy moments on to his parade of the ordinary he can pass the thing off as a fully integrated sitcom", and White calls the show "unrelentingly average." A 1999 review from the Guardian is positive, writing that "it's odd but when people ask why the BBC doesn't make decent mainstream sitcoms anymore, Andrew Marshall's glorious saga of the hapless Porters rarely gets a mention. Going strong since 1991, the new series is as sharp as ever".

In 2004, the series ranked #44 in the BBC television poll, Britain's Best Sitcom.

== Home media ==
BBC Enterprises released a video in 1993, comprising the first three episodes of the series, which are known as: Leader of the Pack, Saturday Night and Sunday Morning, and When the Going Gets Tough, the Tough Go Shopping.

The first three series were released on Region 2 DVD by Eureka Video in 2005. A box set of the first three series was also made available in 2008, again through Eureka Video, with music changes within the episodes. Eureka Video stated that "sales were not good" and they released no further series. 2Entertain, part of BBC Worldwide, say they have tried many times to license the series for distribution by a third party but the high clearance costs for music and imagery used has been the main deterrent.

A Facebook campaign for a release of the whole series was started in 2009.

The series was added to Britbox on 16 December 2021 In March 2022, all 56 episodes were made available on the BBC iPlayer for one year, however as of 27 July 2024, all 8 series' are still available to watch on BBC iPlayer.

Title	Format	Release date	Features
2point4 children – Leader of the Pack	VHS	26 February 1996	Includes Series 1: Episodes 1–3; BBFC rating: PG
2point4 children – The Complete Series One	DVD	24 January 2005	6 episodes; 1 disc; 177 minutes; Dolby Digital AC3; Subtitles: English SDH; Special features: Tribute to Gary Olsen; Stills Gallery; BBFC rating: PG
2point4 children – The Complete Series Two	DVD	25 April 2005	7 episodes; 1992 Christmas special (included as special feature); 1 disc; 203 minutes; Dolby Digital AC3; Subtitles: English SDH; BBFC rating: PG
2point4 children – The Complete Series Three	DVD	22 August 2005	6 episodes; 1993 Christmas special (included as special feature); 1 disc; 206 minutes; Dolby Digital AC3; Subtitles: English SDH; BBFC rating: PG
2point4 children – Series One to Three	DVD	22 September 2008	19 episodes; Special features: Tribute to Gary Olsen; Stills Gallery; 1992 Christmas special; 1993 Christmas special; 3 discs; 586 minutes; Dolby Digital AC3; Subtitles: English SDH; BBFC rating: PG

== Remake ==
Kees & Co
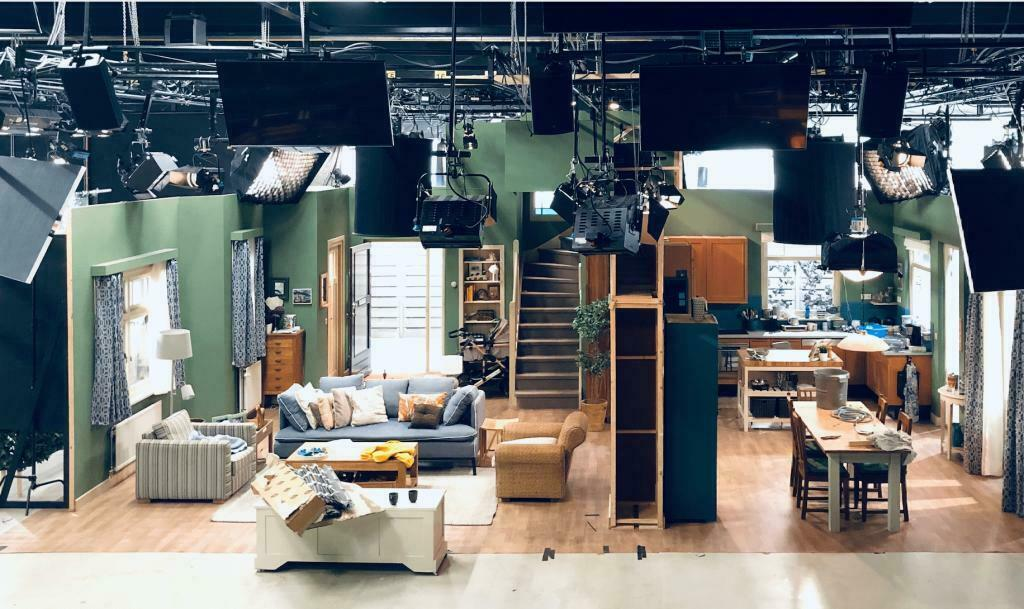
- Set for the 2019 revival.
- Genre: Sitcom
- Based on: 2point4 Children by Andrew Marshall
- Written by: Martine Bijl (seasons 1-5); Lenny Barker (seasons 5-6); Haye van der Heyden (seasons 7-8); Alex van Galen (seasons 9-10)
- Directed by: Tony Craven; Hans de Korte; Wim Dröge; Zdeněk Kraus
- Starring: Simone Kleinsma; Rik Hoogendoorn; Amber Teterissa; Robin Tjon Pian Gi; Esther Roord; Han Oldigs; Victor Löw; Nikkie Plessen; Sascha Visser; Margo Dames; Chantal Janzen; Tibor Lukács; Plien van Bennekom; Lizzy van Vleuten; Maurits van Brakel; Tina de Bruin
- Composers: Hans van Eijck; Martijn Schimmer
- Country of origin: Netherlands
- Original language: Dutch
- No. of seasons: 10
- No. of episodes: 111

Production
- Running time: 22-25 minutes
- Production companies: Endemol; MediaLane; RTL Nederland

Original release
- Network: RTL 4
- Release: 20 September 1997 – 25 May 2006
- Release: 30 March 2019 – 4 April 2020

In 1997 a remake of the show debuted in the Netherlands: Kees & Co starring Simone Kleinsma. The remake ran for eight series between 1997 and 2006. The first five series were adapted from the original English-language scripts, whilst the last three series featured original storylines and characters. In 2018 it was announced that the remake would return for a ninth series with Kleinsma reprising her role.
