= The Inquisitor (Red Dwarf) =

- Red Dwarf episode
- Episode no.: Series 5 Episode 2
- Directed by: Juliet May; Grant Naylor
- Written by: Rob Grant; Doug Naylor
- Original air date: 27 February 1992

Guest appearances
- Jack Docherty as The Inquisitor; Jake Abraham as Second Lister; Tim Yeates as Second Kryten (uncredited); James Cormack as Thomas Allman; Duane Cox as Young Lister (uncredited); Carl Chase as Old Lister (uncredited)

Episode chronology
← Previous "Holoship"	Next → "Terrorform"
- Red Dwarf V

"The Inquisitor" is the second episode of science fiction sitcom Red Dwarf Series V and the twenty sixth in the series run. It was first broadcast on the British television channel BBC2 on 27 February 1992. It was written by Rob Grant and Doug Naylor, and directed by Juliet May and Grant Naylor. The episode's plot deals with a time travelling simulant who visits Red Dwarf to assess if they are worthy of their existence.

== Plot ==
Arnold Rimmer (Chris Barrie), Dave Lister (Craig Charles), Kryten (Robert Llewellyn) and Cat (Danny John-Jules) find a trip out on a Starbug cut short when they are returned to Red Dwarf. The group discover it to be the work of The Inquisitor (Jack Docherty) – a self-repairing simulant who survived until the end of time, concluded that, as there was no God, the only point of existence was to lead a worthwhile life and is now time-travelling throughout history to judge all, removing from existence all he has judged unworthy of existence and replacing with others who could have been conceived in their places. Each member of the group finds themselves judged by the Inquisitor through a copy of themselves, the only means of judgement that the Inquisitor deemed to be fair. While Rimmer and Cat are spared with their arguments and own low standards for their own lives, Kryten and Lister find that they have been judged to be unworthy as a result of their mechanoid programming and lack of motivation. Both find themselves removed from the time-stream. Before they are erased, a future version of Kryten arrives and amputates the Inquisitor's left hand that holds a time-manipulating gauntlet, passing it to both before he is killed, and leaving them with a cryptic clue to operating it.

Escaping from the simulant, the pair seek out their friends, but find they no longer recognise them since being removed from history. Lister attempts to convince Rimmer that he and Kryten know him and the Cat (and not to eject them from the airlock) by citing a number of embarrassing personal details about him. They also meet their un-conceived equivalents. The Inquisitor soon catches up with the pair and attempts to destroy them but inadvertently kills their replacements, allowing them to escape again partly by Lister's use of his equivalent's severed hand to open locked doors. Kryten soon works out how to use the gauntlet from the clue they received, using it to age away their restraints. Rimmer and Cat, now convinced that Lister and Kryten are friends rather than foes, are destroyed upon confronting the Inquisitor. Kryten uses the gauntlet to freeze the simulant in place. To keep the timeline coherent, Kryten uses it to go back in time and avoid a paradox. Meanwhile, Lister uses the Inquisitor's other time gauntlet to put the simulant in danger in order to bargain for his life being spared by saving his life, only for the Inquisitor to declare that he can erase him to prevent himself being endangered. Upon doing so, his gauntlet backfires, not knowing Lister had Kryten reprogramme it, causing the Inquisitor to be erased from existence, while restoring everyone and history to its original state.

== Production ==
"The Inquisitor", which was the second episode to be filmed, was considered by Grant and Naylor to lead the series, but as it was heavily science fiction influenced, the casual viewer friendly Holoship was chosen to go out first instead.

With the show returning to Stage G for filming, new director Juliet May decided to shoot "Demons & Angels" first over "The Inquisitor". "Holoship" had been put back in the filming schedule because of guest star availability and "The Inquisitor" was passed on by the new director as she was still trying to make sense of the script.

Jack Docherty played The Inquisitor, James Cormack played Thomas Allman and Jake Abraham played the alternative Lister.

== Reception ==
The episode was originally broadcast on the British television channel BBC2 on 27 February 1992.

In the 1992 readers' poll held by Red Dwarf Smegazine it ranked 20th out of the then 30 existing episodes.

== See also ==
- Predestination paradox
- Time travel in fiction
