= Quarantine (Red Dwarf) =

- Red Dwarf episode
- Rimmer contracts a holo-virus and, with the help of Mr Flibble, turns against the crew
- Episode no.: Series 5 Episode 4
- Directed by: Grant Naylor
- Written by: Rob Grant; Doug Naylor
- Original air date: 12 March 1992

Guest appearances
- Maggie Steed as Dr Hildegarde Lanstrom; Mr. Flibble as himself

Episode chronology
← Previous "Terrorform"	Next → "Demons & Angels"
- Red Dwarf V

"Quarantine" is the fourth episode of science fiction sitcom Red Dwarf Series V and the twenty eighth in the series run. It was first broadcast on the British television channel BBC2 on 12 March 1992.

The episode, fifth to be filmed, was the first one to be solely directed by Rob Grant and Doug Naylor. The episode has Rimmer contracting a holo-virus and turning against the rest of the crew.

== Plot ==
Red Dwarf receives a distress signal from a hologram of Dr. Hildegarde Lanstrom and proceed to investigate it at the Viral Research Centre. While Dave Lister (Craig Charles), Kryten (Robert Llewellyn) and Cat (Danny John-Jules) venture into the complex, Arnold Rimmer (Chris Barrie) is advised to return to Red Dwarf, as they plan to rescue Lanstrom but cannot bring her aboard their Starbug because it can only generate one hologram. With the same being true of Red Dwarf, this raises the prospect of a 'time share' arrangement in which Rimmer would have to relinquish some of his run time. Annoyed at Kryten seemingly citing Space Corps Directives only to him, Rimmer is given a copy of the Directives Manual to read for his trip back.

Upon finding Lanstrom (Maggie Steed), Lister, Kryten and Cat find that she contracted a holo-virus that turned her insane and gave her Psionic powers, but also learn that this has shortened her life-span. The group, thus, opts to give her the run-around until the virus kills her, unaware of her using a radio to contact Rimmer. When Lanstrom finally dies, the group examine her research notes, discovering that she was working on a theory that viruses can be positive as well as negative and isolated a number of positive viruses.

On the return trip, Lister tests a virus that Lanstrom isolated that boosts luck, discovering it gives him incredible luck for a brief time until his body's natural defences combat it. Upon returning to Red Dwarf, the group find that Rimmer has taken full control of the ship after returning ahead of them, and redirects their Starbug to the ship's quarantine bay as part of a Space Corps Directive he had read. Using the Directives, Rimmer manages to turn quarantine into a torturous experience, granting Lister, Cat and Kryten only single's quarters (as Lister is the only registered crewmate), devising a meal plan consisting solely of sprouts, and providing them with monotonous or faulty leisure facilities. Forced to endure isolation for five days and slowly finding themselves beginning to get on each other's nerves, the group realise that they can challenge Rimmer to re-test them. However, they soon discover that he has contracted the holo-virus, suspecting that Lanstrom managed to pass it onto him via Starbug's radio. After Rimmer decides to deny the group oxygen for two hours to punish them for insanity (with their attempts at playing along only convincing Rimmer of their insanity), Lister opts to use the luck virus to save them, not only managing to get them out of quarantine, but also allowing him to find equipment that Kryten needs to purge the virus from Rimmer. After things return to normal, Rimmer is put into quarantine to make him endure it at the enjoyment of the others.

== Production ==
Juliet May left as director during the shooting of Red Dwarf V, and the remaining episodes were directed by Rob Grant and Doug Naylor. "Quarantine", which was fifth to be filmed in the series, was the first one to be solely directed by the co-creators. Although supposed to be a bottle episode with simple 'dialogue' for the series, Grant and Naylor found it hard going.

The original idea was to have each of the crew infected with Psi-powers, but this was later changed to the positive viruses story. Time constraints, coupled with the fact that it was pitched as the cheap show, meant that the script wasn't developed as well as Grant and Naylor had hoped. It was the cheap show so that the others were affordable.

== Reception ==
The episode was originally broadcast on the British television channel BBC2 on 12 March 1992. The Hull Daily Mail said that it was "good entertainment - even if science fiction is not your thing - and good performances from the cast member bolsters the script".

A poll in the Red Dwarf Smegazine from 1992 ranked it as the second best episode from the series, just behind "Back to Reality".

Viewers particularly enjoyed Rimmer's descent into insanity, the character of Mr. Flibble becoming a fan favourite. The episode has been described as one which "epitomizes the blend of sci-fi and comedy that made the show such a hit."

Writing in 2017 for CultBox, Sophie Davies noted that in the episode Rimmer "[reverts] to being as antagonistic and unpleasant as he was in the very first series", and continued "However, because it's such an iconic episode (The gingham dress! Mr Flibble! The luck virus!) you'd have to be quite pernickety to really care."
