= Red Dwarf V =

Series of television

- Starring: Chris Barrie; Craig Charles; Danny John-Jules; Robert Llewellyn; Hattie Hayridge
- No. of episodes: 6

Release
- Original network: BBC2
- Original release: 20 February – 26 March 1992

Series chronology
- ← Previous; Red Dwarf IV Next → Red Dwarf VI

Red Dwarf V is the fifth series of the British science fiction sitcom Red Dwarf. It consisted of six episodes and was broadcast on UK television channel BBC2 between 20 February and 26 March 1992.

The series follows the life of technician Dave Lister (Craig Charles), who is the only survivor of an accident on the spaceship Red Dwarf, and the last survivor of the human race, three million years in the future, and his shipmates, a holographic reproduction of his dead bunkmate and boss, Arnold Rimmer (Chris Barrie), a sapient Cat (Danny John-Jules) who is a result of three million years' evolution, sanitation droid Kryten (Robert Llewellyn), and the ship's computer Holly (Hattie Hayridge).

== Production ==
The first four series of Red Dwarf had been directed by Ed Bye, but he was unavailable for Red Dwarf V as he agreed to direct The Full Wax, fronted by his wife Ruby Wax.

Juliet May was brought in to direct, having been recommended by former producer Paul Jackson who had worked with her on Heil Honey I'm Home. Red Dwarf V was a more technically ambitious series, and May struggled with some of the technical aspects of the show; she left during the studio recordings. Writer-producers Rob Grant and Doug Naylor took over themselves, and completed the series, directing "Quarantine and "Back to Reality", and doing reshoots for "Demons & Angels", which featured large use of split screen effects.

Locations used included a pumping station near Sunbury for "Quarantine" and "The Inquisitor".

== Casting ==
"Holoship" features the crew of a holographic exploratory ship, including Jane Horrocks playing Rimmer's love interest Nirvanah Crane, and Don Warrington as Commander Binks.

"The Inquisitor" features Jack Docherty as the titular character, The Inqusitor, an android who travels through time and space visiting individuals and eliminating those he deems unworthy of life. Alternative versions of Lister and Kryten appear, played by Jake Abraham and Tim Yeates respectively.

"Back to Reality" features Timothy Spall as the technician who greets the crew when they wake up and discover they have been playing a computer game for four years.

== Reception ==
Writing in 2015, Den of Geek ranked Red Dwarf V the best series of the show, saying that "the most balanced series in terms of character comedy versus sci-fi adventure", praising the use of Chris Barrie as Rimmer, and in particular saying that "Back to Reality" is "a perfect episode and could easily work as a movie in its own right".

In 2017, Sophie Davies of CultBox noted that the series was "noticeably darker in tone", and said: "At the height of my obsession with Red Dwarf, this was certainly my most watched series. [...] "Back to Reality" frequently tops lists of the greatest Red Dwarf episodes and it isn't difficult to see why".

== Episodes ==
No. overall	No. in series	Title	Directed by	Written by	Original release date	Prod. code	Viewers (millions)
25	1	"Holoship"	Juliet May	Rob Grant and Doug Naylor	20 February 1992	3	5.63
Rimmer is abducted by holograms of superior intelligence, and taken to a space vessel which is itself holographic. There, Rimmer has a physical presence and twice-daily sex is a health requirement but emotional attachment is bad manners. Rimmer applies to join the crew, feeling that this is his chance of becoming an officer and getting a life. To do this he must pass an exam against a fellow hologram, which is complicated when he discovers his opponent is Nirvanah Crane (Jane Horrocks), a female hologram who's fallen for him.
26	2	"The Inquisitor"	Juliet May and Grant Naylor	Rob Grant and Doug Naylor	27 February 1992	2	5.44
The Inquisitor is a time-travelling android who acts as judge, jury and executioner to those who have led worthless lives, and thus erases them from history. The Red Dwarf crew are next to appear before this judge to justify their existence. It does not look good for our crew of slobs, failures and misfits.
27	3	"Terrorform"	Juliet May	Rob Grant and Doug Naylor	5 March 1992	4	5.48
Kryten and Rimmer crash land on a "psi-moon", an artificial planetoid which terraforms itself to match the inner psyche and subconscious of anyone who lands on it. Kryten is trapped under wreckage from the crash, and Rimmer finds himself alone and taken prisoner by manifestations of his own inner demons. Lister, Cat and Holly arrive to rescue them, They find themselves trapped in an environment shaped by Rimmer's bizarre, self-loathing mind.
28	4	"Quarantine"	Grant Naylor	Rob Grant and Doug Naylor	12 March 1992	5	5.54
After investigating an abandoned biological research complex on an ice planet, Lister, Cat and Kryten return to Red Dwarf only to find Rimmer has taken over the ship. While Rimmer orders them into quarantine for three months, he himself is slowly taken over by an electronic holo-virus that corrupts his holographic form, giving him telekinesis, hex vision, and many other powers, and turning him completely insane.
29	5	"Demons & Angels"	Juliet May and Grant Naylor	Rob Grant and Doug Naylor	19 March 1992	1	6.04
An experiment with a machine—a Triplicator—that can make duplicates of an object goes wrong, causing Red Dwarf to explode. The crew escape aboard Starbug but find that the Triplicator has made two copies of Red Dwarf in place of the original. One of these copies has extracted the "good" qualities of the former vessel, and the other has extracted the "bad" qualities. The crew board one, first meeting angelic versions of themselves, then to the other, meeting their demonic versions.
30	6	"Back to Reality"	Juliet May and Grant Naylor	Rob Grant and Doug Naylor	26 March 1992	6	6.54
The crew take Starbug down into the watery depths of an ocean planet to investigate the wreck of the SSS Esperanto. They find that the ship's crew have committed suicide, then escape to try to avoid attack from a sea monster, the "Despair Squid". The crew suddenly wake up to find they are not who they think they are; Red Dwarf and Starbug did not exist, and they have in fact been playing a virtual reality computer game for four years.

== Home media release ==
The series was released in July and August 1994 on VHS, in two videos of three episodes each, and on DVD in 2005.
