= Rimmerworld =

- Red Dwarf episode
- Episode no.: Series 6 Episode 5
- Directed by: Andy de Emmony
- Written by: Rob Grant; Doug Naylor
- Original air date: 4 November 1993

Guest appearance
- Liz Hickling as Rogue Simulant

Episode chronology
← Previous "Emohawk: Polymorph II"	Next → "Out of Time"
- Red Dwarf VI

"Rimmerworld" is the fifth episode of science fiction sit-com Red Dwarf Series VI and the 35th in the series run. It was first broadcast on the British television channel BBC2 on 4 November 1993, and was written by Rob Grant & Doug Naylor and was directed by Andy de Emmony.

== Plot ==
Arnold Rimmer (Chris Barrie) undergoes a medical examination and learns he has a stress-related condition that could give him an electronic aneurysm, resulting in his death. Kryten (Robert Llewellyn) prescribes several stress relief measures to prevent this, including Chinese worry balls. Shortly after this, the pair join Dave Lister (Craig Charles) and Cat (Danny John-Jules) in investigating the simulant ship they defeated a few weeks earlier for supplies. While aboard, the group finds that one crew member (Elizabeth Hickling) survived their encounter and confronts them. Rimmer opts to flee in an escape pod, inadvertently triggering the collapse of the ship. Kryten, Lister and Cat use the matter transporter they had been using to load supplies onto "Starbug" as an alternative exit. However, their return to the ship is stalled by Kryten making a programming error on the device and sending them back into their past a week ago, meeting their past selves. Once they have returned, the group finds Rimmer's pod, which Kryten discovers was looted and had terraforming equipment, is being drawn into a wormhole with time dilation effects, meaning that it will take six centuries from Rimmer's perspective for them to recover him but only a few hours from the crew's.

Rimmer opts to wait upon the closest S3 planet beyond the wormhole that the pod lands on, and uses the equipment to create a paradise for himself for the time being. When the rest of the crew finally reach him, they find themselves confronted by a race of power-hungry Rimmer-clones, who throw them into a dungeon with the real Rimmer. Through him, the group learns that he attempted to create a female companion but created clones of himself instead, who eventually overthrew him, much to his despair. With his hard light drive preventing him from being executed, Rimmer was imprisoned for over five centuries. Rimmer further explains that the others will be executed for having un-Rimmer like traits, which the clones consider a crime, which Kryten points out will cause the clones to not evolve and die out. Although Lister forms a complex plan to escape, Kryten simply suggests they use the transporter to return to Starbug, though he causes another programming error that takes the crew out of the present. Believing that they have again travelled into the past, Lister and Cat tease "past" Rimmer about his future six-hundred-year ordeal. However, informing the crew that they have in fact travelled weeks into the future, future Rimmer implies that something terrible will happen to Lister, leaving him worried for his future before they leave.

== Production ==
"Rimmerworld" was a follow-up to "Gunmen of the Apocalypse" but was recorded the week before it. The episode was eventually moved to be fifth in the series, with "Emohawk: Polymorph II" in between.

== Cultural references ==
The process of terraforming the planet from desolation to verdant paradise over the course of six days mimics the Genesis creation narrative. The Biblical allusion continues with Rimmer comparing himself to Adam in the Garden of Eden, however, he seemingly confuses that story with the adventures of Tarzan in which Jane is the love interest of the jungle-dwelling hero. The Thirty Years' War and the Hundred Years' War are both referenced when Kryten explains how long Rimmer will spend on the other side of the wormhole before help can arrive.

== Reception ==
This episode has been described as "one of the strangest adventures" in Series VI.

The episode was due to be broadcast as part of a repeat season on 13 March 1996. It was suspended due to the Dunblane massacre, when it was feared that the gun-toting simulant at the start of the episode, and other references to a "psychotic deranged ruthless killer", could be thought to parallel the real-life tragedy, and thus be considered offensive. "Out of Time" was shown in its place, followed by series IV episode "Dimension Jump" a week later; "Rimmerworld" itself was eventually repeated in mid-April.
