= Emohawk: Polymorph II =

- Red Dwarf episode
- Episode no.: Series 6 Episode 4
- Directed by: Andy de Emmony
- Written by: Rob Grant; Doug Naylor
- Original air date: 28 October 1993

Guest appearances
- Ainsley Harriott as Gelf Chief; Steven Wickham as Gelf Bride; Martin Sims as Gelf; Hugh Quarshie as Computer

Episode chronology
← Previous "Gunmen of the Apocalypse"	Next → "Rimmerworld"
- Red Dwarf VI

"Emohawk: Polymorph II" is the fourth episode of the British science fiction sitcom TV show Red Dwarf VI and the 34th in the series run. It was first broadcast on BBC2 on 28 October 1993 and written by Rob Grant and Doug Naylor and directed by Andy de Emmony.

The episode features the crew again being hunted by a polymorph, making a reapperance from the series III episode "Polymorph". Also returning in this episode are Duane Dibbley from "Back to Reality" and Ace Rimmer from "Dimension Jump".

== Plot ==
Starbug finds itself being hounded by a computer-controlled Space Corps enforcement vessel that soon scans the ship. Dave Lister (Craig Charles), Arnold Rimmer (Chris Barrie), Kryten (Robert Llewellyn) and Cat (Danny John-Jules) find themselves charged with looting derelict spaceships and sentenced to death under frontier law. The crew escape, but crash-land on a GELF moon. Needing a new oxygen generator for the ship, they search for a GELF tribe who might be willing to trade with them. The group meet the Kinitawowi tribe, and begin negotiations, only for Lister to discover he must marry the daughter (Steven Wickham) of the tribe's chief (Ainsley Harriot) in exchange for the oxygen generation unit. Scared of his wife's advances, Lister flees back to Starbug, forcing the others to escape as well with the parts.

Angered at their actions upsetting his daughter, the chief sends his pet Emohawk—a domesticated polymorph—after them. The polymorph manages to get aboard Starbug undetected before it leaves the moon. While Lister and Kryten work to install the new parts, the polymorph attacks the others, draining them each of a character trait and morphing them into an alternate persona – Cat loses his cool and morphs into Duane Dibbley, while Rimmer loses his bitterness and becomes Ace Rimmer. When the others are trapped by Rimmer in the cargo hold and learn that he is preparing to sacrifice himself and Cat to get rid of the polymorph via an airlock, Lister and Kryten break free and convince him to track down the creature and freeze it. Rimmer agrees, whereupon the group successfully neutralize the polymorph. Rimmer politely asks that he spends another 24 hours as Ace before he is changed back, while Cat asks to be changed back immediately fearing his persona's clumsiness; his fears are justified when he accidentally freezes the others a few seconds later.

== Production ==
Steven Wickham as Dave Lister's Kinitawowi bride

The GELF settlement was a re-dressed medieval village set which had been created for the aborted British/American television series Covington Cross. Ainsley Harriott played the role of the GELF chief. Harriott later became a celebrity chef and hosted the television shows Can't Cook, Won't Cook and Ready Steady Cook for the BBC. Later, in 1998, Harriott presented a special edition of Can't Cook, Won't Cook called Can't Smeg, Won't Smeg for the 10th anniversary of Red Dwarf with the cast cooking a meal while remaining in character (Harriott's role was actually addressed during part of the episode). The Tribal chief's daughter, Hackhackhack Ach Hachhachac, is played by Steven Wickham (who, 19 years later, would play the BEGG chief in the episode Entangled). Hugh Quarshie also played a Computer and Martin Sims also played a GELF.

== Reception ==
The episode was originally broadcast on the British television channel BBC2 on 28 October 1993.

Gavrielle Perry felt the re-introduction of Ace, Duane Dibbley and the polymorph was a wasted opportunity.

Sophie Davies of CultBox wrote in 2017 that it "has its moments but is identifiably the weakest episode of the series", concluding "It may have a fun middle segment, but the opening and closing segments of 'Emohawk: Polymorph II' are Red Dwarf at its most unimaginative."
