= Demons & Angels (Red Dwarf) =

- Red Dwarf episode
- Episode no.: Series 5 Episode 5
- Directed by: Juliet May; Grant Naylor
- Written by: Rob Grant; Doug Naylor
- Original air date: 19 March 1992

Episode chronology
← Previous "Quarantine"	Next → "Back to Reality"
- Red Dwarf V

"Demons & Angels" is the fifth episode of science fiction sit-com Red Dwarf Series V and the twenty ninth in the series run. It was written by Rob Grant and Doug Naylor and the episode was the first to be filmed with new director Juliet May. The episode has the regular Red Dwarf crew meeting angelic and demonic versions of themselves.

== Plot ==
Kryten (Robert Llewellyn) creates a device derived from the Matter Paddle called the Triplicator, hoping it will solve any future supply problems that might arise on Red Dwarf. Testing it on a strawberry, Dave Lister (Craig Charles) opts to test the two copies it makes, finding that one is divinely succulent while the other is filled with maggots. Kryten deduces that the device creates copies that appear identical but are different – one retains the best elements while the other retains the worst. When Lister opts to test the device in reversal mode, he inadvertently destroys the ship's science lab, damages the voice unit of ship's computer Holly (Hattie Hayridge) and sets the ship's engine core into meltdown. As a result, he, Kryten, Arnold Rimmer (Chris Barrie) and the Cat (Danny John-Jules) are forced to escape in a Starbug moments before Red Dwarf explodes. When they discover they are low on essential supplies including oxygen for Lister and Cat and battery power for Rimmer, the group's attempt to scan for more leads them to discovering that there are two identical copies of Red Dwarf. Kryten realises that the triplicator created them when put into reverse, destroying the original in the process.

Discovering they must rebuild the triplicator to restore the original Red Dwarf, the group are forced to find the components for it on both copies before they both cease to exist. While they discover one of these is an idyllic version of Red Dwarf, with virtuous copies of themselves that embody the best of their personalities, the second copy is a demonic version of Red Dwarf, with versions of themselves that embody the worst of their personalities. Their demonic counterparts opt to fight them in order to take control of a new ship as their own is decaying, destroying their angelic counterparts, while capturing Lister and implanting a remote control device to make him kill the others. However, Lister manages to warn the others, allowing Kryten to subdue their demonic counterparts, rebuild the triplicator, and reverse its effects on Red Dwarf. However, Lister accidentally re-implants the control device he had had removed from his body. Cat uses it to punish him for putting the group through considerable danger.

== Production ==
"Demons & Angels", which had the working title "High & Low", was the first episode from Series V to be filmed. Following the departure of Ed Bye, who had directed all the previous four series' episodes, Juliet May was brought in as the new director.

Significant reshoots on the episode had to be done after the departure of May from the show, after the series' wrap party, with Grant and Naylor acting as directors.

For this series the Red Dwarf model was rebuilt from the original version which had fallen apart over the years. The ship explosion was filmed using pyrotechnics and shooting the cameras at three thousand frames a second. From a few seconds of explosions the crew got around 20 seconds' worth of film footage.

To achieve the High and Low versions interacting with the regular Red Dwarf crew, traditional split screen techniques were used with a locked-off camera. Doubles were employed for other scenes. Craig Charles performed bluescreen scenes to roll on the floor in front of himself; the video effects crew added a holowhip.

At one point, the Doctor's TARDIS from Doctor Who can be seen parked in the Red Dwarf's landing bay. The shot was originally filmed for "Marooned", but was cut from that episode.

== Reception ==
The episode was originally broadcast on the British television channel BBC2 on 19 March 1992.

In the Red Dwarf Smegazine survey of fans in 1992, the episode placed 21st out of the 30 then-existing episodes.
