= Terrorform =

- Red Dwarf episode
- Episode no.: Series 5 Episode 3
- Directed by: Juliet May
- Written by: Rob Grant; Doug Naylor
- Original air date: 5 March 1992

Guest appearances
- Sara Stockbridge as Handmaiden; Francine Walker-Lee as Handmaiden

Episode chronology
← Previous "The Inquisitor"	Next → "Quarantine"
- Red Dwarf V

"Terrorform" is the third episode of science fiction sit-com Red Dwarf Series V and the twenty-seventh in the series run. It was first broadcast on the British television channel BBC2 on 5 March 1992. It was written by Rob Grant and Doug Naylor, and was directed by Juliet May. The episode's plot has the Red Dwarf crew rescuing Rimmer from a moon based on his own psyche.

== Plot ==
While moon-hopping in Starbug, Arnold Rimmer (Chris Barrie) and Kryten (Robert Llewellyn) become separated in a planet-quake. Badly damaged, Kryten detaches his hand, and sends it back to Red Dwarf for help. The hand scares Dave Lister (Craig Charles) and Cat (Danny John-Jules) at first, since Holly (Hattie Hayridge) described it as a tarantula-like creature when it arrived. Taking another Starbug, they track down Kryten and repair him. Searching for Rimmer, the surroundings lead Kryten, Lister and the Cat to conclude that they've landed on a "psi-moon": an artificial planetoid that can tune into an individual's psyche and adapt its terrain to mimic his mental state. This psi-moon has appeared to emphasise Rimmer's mostly dominant negative qualities, with his positive ones being weak and represented by a graveyard.

The group find Rimmer imprisoned by hooded legions of his negative emotions and The Unspeakable One—a creature made of his self-loathing, with the hologram having been given a physical presence as a side-effect of the moon's transformative abilities. Attempting to rescue him, they find themselves struggling against The Unspeakable One. It retreats when Kryten reassures Rimmer they will not leave him behind. When they find their Starbug trapped in quicksand, Lister and Kryten conclude the only way to break free is to show love for Rimmer and boost his self-confidence. In response, Rimmer's self-respect and confidence emerge from the graveyard as musketeers and slay Rimmer's personal demons. After their escape, Rimmer has the others to admit that the admiration was merely a ruse.

== Production ==
Another episode that was cut in the edit room although this time it was felt that some of the dialogue did not work. The final scenes with the crew gathering around Rimmer to make him feel wanted was trimmed down.

Other small cuts included the Master, who was fully built, but cut down to show only a hand, foot or shadow. This was considered more effective than seeing the character full on.

Some scenes from this episode were incorporated into the second pilot (actually, a promo reel) for the prospective American Red Dwarf series.

Sara Stockbridge and Francine Walker-Lee both appeared as Handmaidens.

== Cultural references ==
- At the start of the episode when Kryten is knocked offline, his CPU plays him a musak version of Copacabana. On the first transmission of this episode the recording used was that by James Last and his orchestra, but subsequent showings used that by Victor Silvester Junior.

== Reception ==
The episode was originally broadcast on the British television channel BBC2 on 5 March 1992.

The 1992 Red Dwarf Smegazine poll ranked the episode 26th out of the 30 then-existing episodes, the second-lowest result of a Red Dwarf V episode.

A book in 2011 said that the episode "provides an excellent example of how writers Grant and Naylor combine sci-fi premise with a closer look inside one their regular characters."

Writing in 2017 for CultBox, Sophie Davies said that the episode "has possibly the best opening to any episode of the series", and it was "an inventive episode that manages to cover new ground when it comes to Rimmer's neuroses."
