= Legion (Red Dwarf) =

- Red Dwarf episode
- Episode no.: Series 6 Episode 2
- Directed by: Andy De Emmony
- Written by: Rob Grant; Doug Naylor
- Original air date: 14 October 1993

Guest appearance
- Nigel Williams as Legion

Episode chronology
← Previous "Psirens"	Next → "Gunmen of the Apocalypse"
- Red Dwarf VI

"Legion" is the second episode of science fiction sit-com Red Dwarf Series VI and the 32nd in the show overall. It was first broadcast on British television on 14 October 1993, and was written by Rob Grant and Doug Naylor and was directed by Andy de Emmony.

== Plot ==
To maintain constant pursuit of Red Dwarf, Dave Lister (Craig Charles) and Cat (Danny John-Jules) handle the piloting of Starbug through shifts. However, Kryten (Robert Llewellyn) informs Arnold Rimmer (Chris Barrie) that the ship is running low on food and water. As the ship passes by a deserted space station, it is pulled in by a tractor beam, and the crew opt to explore the station for supplies. When aboard, Kryten notes that his scanner registers a life-form, despite not showing one earlier, which soon appears before them as a mysterious entity called Legion (Nigel Williams). After explaining that he was a creation of the greatest minds that inhabited the station, Legion offers a token of good faith by demonstrating his incredible technological intelligence. Legion gives Lister an instantaneous emergency appendectomy. Legion also modifies Rimmer's light bee, allowing him to alternate between a "soft light" and "hard light" hologram – the latter form allows him to be able to touch and feel. Impressed, the crew try to recruit him to join them on their quest to find Red Dwarf, but Legion insists that they stay with him.

The following morning, the group admit that they have become Legion's prisoners, despite each enjoying accommodations tailored to their unique personal tastes and requirements. When they attempt to escape by overpowering him, they find Legion is a gestalt entity – a combination of all active minds present on the station, melded together to form one, who became a mindless, formless entity when the station's original occupants perished from old age.

Kryten notices that Legion loses a persona when one of them is unconscious, and so convinces the others to be knocked out, forcing Legion to manifest his persona only. Legion admits relief when this happens, wishing not to share their assorted neuroses, and helps Kryten to return the crew to Starbug, providing them with a stardrive that the scientists had created to help them catch up to Red Dwarf. However, when the crew attempt to use it, the drive shoots out of the ship, leaving them to struggle with the sudden decompression it creates.

== Production ==
The working title for the episode was "Call Me Legion", and later shortened to "Legion". This episode introduces the "hard light" holograms – an indestructible physical form which Rimmer could form into. It was becoming tiresome for the writers that Rimmer couldn't touch anything, so it was retained for the remainder of the series.

Nigel Williams played the character of Legion. The costume was so tight he had to be sewn into it, and stay in it until the shoot was finished.

Lister's room music in this episode was "Hot and Wild Number 1" by the musician Chris Tsangarides.

== Cultural references ==
The episode title and certain dialogue reference Mark 5:9, wherein Jesus confronts a possessed man: "My name is Legion," he replied, "for we are many."

Audience laughter can be heard when Kryten mentions "Quayle" in a list of "the most brilliant minds of the 23rd century". In 1993 the name conjured up the image of Dan Quayle, the former U.S. Vice President who was popularly perceived as being incompetent. He also mentions "Davro", most likely a reference to singer and comedian Bobby Davro, as well as "Holder", a reference to Slade singer Noddy Holder.

The "Ionian Nerve Grip" which Kryten pretends to use on Rimmer is patterned after the famous Vulcan nerve pinch from Star Trek.

== Reception ==
The episode was well received by fans, and Rob Grant has described this episode as one of his favourites, and has said that "I think that's the funniest start to a show we've ever done, [also] it's got some great set pieces in it, the chopsticks scene..."

Sophie Davies, writing in 2017 for CultBox, said that "'Legion' is one of series VI's best episodes, with a nice mix of verbal and slapstick humour and a reasonably simple plot." Tom Salinsky's 2024 book about the show says "the main problem with this episode is that there isn't much excitement", but notes "this is very good stuff, with great jokes, a well-placed plot, and a new challenge for the crew. [...] For a show on its sixth year and its thirty-second episode, this is very impressive."
