= Out of Time (Red Dwarf) =

- Red Dwarf episode
- Episode no.: Series 6 Episode 6
- Directed by: Andy de Emmony
- Written by: Rob Grant; Doug Naylor
- Original air date: 11 November 1993

Episode chronology
← Previous "Rimmerworld"	Next → "Tikka to Ride"
- Red Dwarf VI

"Out of Time" is the sixth episode of science fiction sitcom Red Dwarf Series VI and the 36th in the programme's run. It was first broadcast on the British television channel BBC2 on 11 November 1993 and was written by Rob Grant & Doug Naylor and directed by Andy de Emmony.

It was the first Red Dwarf series finale to end on a cliffhanger (discounting Lister's pregnancy in the Series II finale, "Parallel Universe"). It is the final episode with contributions from Rob Grant.

== Plot ==
Things are grim aboard Starbug, as the crew have now lost all trace of Red Dwarf. Rimmer (Chris Barrie) decides to conduct a "morale meeting" and appoints himself "morale officer". However the morale meeting turns out to be nothing more than an excuse for Rimmer to vent his feelings about how much he hates everyone. The rest of the crew discuss the bleak lives they are now leading, but the conversation is stopped when Starbug flies into a region of space populated by unreality pockets, a security measure around a top-secret Space Corps test ship. During one of these, Kryten (Robert Llewellyn) becomes convinced that Dave Lister (Craig Charles) is a 3000 series android (an unsuccessful model, due to its hyper-realistic appearance), after which he is forced to obey orders from Kryten, a 4000 series. After embarrassingly learning the truth, the crew are eager to find what has been protected so elaborately, flying further in as more of these unreality pockets occur, causing more very strong hallucinations. Everyone is about to give up when Kryten suggests the crew go into Deep Sleep.

Once awoken, the crew board the derelict ship and find a device capable of time travel. They learn the derelict ship's crew contracted an influenza virus in the 20th century, 800 years before the ship's origin. They all soon died, and their last act was to pilot the ship into deep space and generate the minefield to drive off looters. The crew test the device, but as it only allows Starbug to travel through time, not space, it is of no use at the moment; however, if a faster-than-light drive can be found, then the time machine will allow them to travel to any time and place they desire.

The crew are subsequently contacted by another Starbug, populated by their future selves. Only Kryten speaks to them to prevent the rest of the crew learning about their futures; however, afterwards he gets very emotional around Lister, which makes him very worried. Lister speaks to Kryten, telling him he understands that he has died in the future, but Kryten tells him that a "David Lister" is aboard the future ship, which seriously confuses Lister. Kryten explains that the future crew's time drive has malfunctioned and only allows them to go forwards. In order to fix it, they need to copy components from the time drive aboard the present Starbug. The future crew board, but everyone except Kryten is sealed in the hold to prevent them from meeting their future counterparts. Lister is desperate to learn what has happened to him and rigs a camera to see what is going on, and each member of the crew is dismayed to discover what they have become: Rimmer is obese, Cat (Danny John-Jules) is bald, Kryten has donned a toupee and a turtleneck sweater, and Lister is merely a brain in a jar. It soon becomes clear that their future selves are snobs and have socialised with some of the most evil figures of history (including the Hitlers, with future Rimmer stating that Hitler is "a hoot" as long as he is not talking politics) and lived in the height of luxury.

Lister refuses to help the future crew after seeing what they have become, and sends them at gunpoint back to their ship without the information they need. Later, as the crew try to come to terms with the fact they are destined to lead selfish and despicable lives, the future crew launch an attack on their past selves and, unwilling to spend the rest of their existence stranded in deep space, are willing to kill the crew knowing they will be wiping themselves out. Rimmer shows uncharacteristic bravery by urging they fight, stating "Better dead than smeg" and the rest of the crew agree. Although things start off well, the more advanced future Starbug causes massive damage, killing Lister, Cat, and Kryten in explosions in the cockpit. Rimmer realises that the crew's only hope is to destroy the time drive, and grabs a bazookoid. Struggling through the bowels of the crumbling ship, he manages to reach the time drive and fires upon it just as Starbug is destroyed by the future crew.

== Production ==
"Out of Time", known as "Present from the Future" during shooting, featured an idea that the writers were thinking about for some time – Lister as an android. The idea never materialised as an episode in its own right but wound up as part of the plot here.

The episode was filmed with autocue prompts installed throughout the Starbug set, since Rob Grant and Doug Naylor did not actually finish the script. They had to type lines for the actors to read, and simultaneously make it look like a well-rehearsed episode to the audience.

"Out of Time" ended with Rimmer blowing the time drive up and the ship exploding, then a caption appearing, which read 'To Be Continued...'. But that was not the initial ending that was filmed – the idea to go with that cliffhanger was thought of in post-production, but then a conclusion to the story was written and recorded; as Rimmer blows up the time drive, he is thrown back and everything around him returns to normal as the future selves never exist; later, the crew celebrate the erasure of their future selves (referencing Lister's earlier statement that the crew never celebrate anything) and Rimmer's bravery which he is uncharacteristically modest about. Kryten then informs everyone that Red Dwarf's vapour trail has been relocated and the crew then toast their good fortune with some margarita. "To the present" says Kryten. Lister then blurts out "That's urine re-cyc", and the crew is left with foam moustaches.

Several other endings were considered, including the crew finding Red Dwarf at the end, which had been the original idea (and would be used in "Nanarchy" in 1997, four years later), but it was decided it would be a better cliffhanger to kill everyone off – especially as the BBC had already said it wanted more Red Dwarf. Nevertheless, due to a number of circumstances, viewers would be waiting three years for a resolution.

== Reception ==
Sophie Davies writing for CultBox in 2017 highlights several funny moments in the first half of the episode, concluding "The future selves encounter is perhaps the weakest part of the episode, although it does include the great line 'Herman Goering is a bit dodgy?' from Kryten and culminates in a surprisingly heroic moment for Rimmer."
