= Psirens =

- Red Dwarf episode
- Episode no.: Series 6 Episode 1
- Directed by: Andy de Emmony
- Written by: Rob Grant; Doug Naylor
- Original air date: 7 October 1993

Guest appearances
- Jenny Agutter as Professor Mamet; Samantha Robson as Pete Tranter's Sister; Anita Dobson as Captain Tau; C.P. Grogan as Kristine Kochanski; Richard Ridings as Crazed Astro; Zoe Hilson as Temptress; Elizabeth Anson as Temptress; Phil Manzanera as Hands of Psiren Lister

Episode chronology
← Previous "Back to Reality"	Next → "Legion"
- Red Dwarf VI

"Psirens" is the first episode of science fiction sit-com Red Dwarf Series VI and the 31st in the series run. It was first broadcast on the British television channel BBC2 on 7 October 1993 and was written by Rob Grant and Doug Naylor and directed by Andy de Emmony. The episode – which involves Psirens who try to lure the crew to them to feast on their brains – had its script published before the episode was broadcast.

== Plot ==
Dave Lister (Craig Charles) awakes aboard Starbug with amnesia, and encounters Kryten (Robert Llewellyn) in the ship's dining area. After being helped by him to recover, and bringing both Arnold Rimmer (Chris Barrie) and Cat (Danny John-Jules) out of hibernation, the mechanoid explains their situation – for the past 200 years, the crew have been chasing after Red Dwarf through its vapour trail, after an unknown party stole it from them following their adventure on the SSS Esperanto, with Holly having gone offline as a result. Proceeding to continue the pursuit, the group attempt to catch up by taking a shortcut through an asteroid belt, only to discover it is a ship graveyard inhabited by Psirens – shape-changing GELFs who prey on unwary travellers by luring them with psychic visions. Despite their best efforts, the Psirens manage to cause them to crash on an asteroid, forcing Lister to attempt to pry them loose from it.

Once outside, a Psiren begins to overpower him with a powerful illusion, but is killed by a second Psiren disguised as Kryten, whom Lister promptly kills when it calls him "Dave", something the real Kryten would never do. Managing to get back aboard, the others find that a third Psiren has disguised itself as Lister, leaving them unable to determine who is the real one and forced to hold both at gunpoint. To determine which one is false, the crew ask them to play guitar, and shoot the fake when it plays well, knowing the real Lister is terrible despite his belief that he is excellent, determining the Psiren's illusion was based on this belief that his skill set was genuine. Wounded, the Psiren disappears, and uses illusions to separate Kryten and put him in the waste compactor, whereupon it proceeds to attack Lister and Cat, after Rimmer's light bee runs out of energy. Kryten, surviving the compactor, manages to kill the Psiren by crushing it with his now cubed-shaped body, allowing the crew to recover and continue pursuing Red Dwarf.

== Production ==
This episode features the first appearance of Kochanski since series 2's "Stasis Leak", albeit as a Psiren illusion used to fool Lister. Clare Grogan returned to play Kochanski for the last time. Samantha Robson plays a Psiren that lures him with an illusion of one of his teenage fantasies - Pete Tranter's sister. Jenny Agutter plays another Psiren, this time an illusion of Kryten's creator Professor Mamet. Anita Dobson also appears as Captain Tau, part of the Psiren illusion to fool Lister. The hands of Phil Manzanera appear in the scene in which the fake Lister plays the guitar brilliantly. Zoe Hilson and Elizabeth Anson both appear as Temptresses in a Psiren illusion to tempt the Cat.

Race Davies and Janan Kubba had been cast as temptresses but in the end were "not used".

Anita Dobson's guest role came about when Grant and Naylor approached her partner (later husband) Brian May about providing his hands for the sequence where the fake Lister plays guitar. Although May was unavailable, Dobson agreed to play the part of Captain Tau when Grant and Naylor mentioned the possibility to her. The two regretted that—had they known that Dobson was willing and available, they would have written something more substantial for her.

Grant and Naylor's script for the episode was collected in the 1993 book Primordial Soup, which was released a few months before the broadcast of the episode itself.

== Cultural references ==
The concept of sirens creating illusions to lure unwary travellers to their deaths first appears in Homer's Odyssey, and this concept is much-repeated in Western film and literature.

== Reception ==
The episode was first broadcast on the British television channel BBC2 on 7 October 1993.

Sophie Davies, writing in 2017 for CultBox, noted that the episode "essentially [re-introduces] the characters, perhaps for the benefit of any new viewers"; and says that the Psirens "are visually scarier than most of the monsters we've seen on the show before" that "deliver some memorable moments". Tom Salinsky said in his 2024 book about the show that "this is a good strong season opener, rather than an all-time classic; an effective plot device which shines a light on most of our regular cast, but doesn't really give us any new insights. Also, I miss Holly."
