= Holoship =

- Red Dwarf episode
- Episode no.: Series 5 Episode 1
- Directed by: Juliet May
- Written by: Rob Grant; Doug Naylor
- Original air date: 20 February 1992

Guest appearances
- Jane Horrocks as Nirvanah Crane; Matthew Marsh as Captain Hercule Platini; Don Warrington as Binks; Simon Day as Randy Navarro; Jane Montgomery as Natalina Pushkin; Lucy Briers as Harrison

Episode chronology
| ← Previous "Meltdown" | Next → "The Inquisitor" |
- Red Dwarf V

"Holoship" is the first episode of Series V of the science fiction sitcom Red Dwarf and the twenty-fifth in the series run. It was first broadcast on the British television channel BBC2 on 20 February 1992. It was written by Rob Grant and Doug Naylor, and directed by Juliet May.

== Plot ==
While travelling aboard Starbug, Dave Lister (Craig Charles), Cat (Danny John-Jules), Kryten (Robert Llewellyn), Arnold Rimmer (Chris Barrie) and Holly (Hattie Hayridge) finish watching a movie. While Lister is left in tears and Kryten praises the film, Rimmer shows disgust over the romantic elements of its plot, claiming no man would abandon their dreams for a woman they love, especially one they will never see again.

Holly interrupts by alerting the group to a nearby craft – a purely holographic vessel called the Enlightenment, not detectable on any sensors, crewed entirely by computer-generated holograms of Space Corps elite personnel. Rimmer is taken aboard and delights in finding himself able to exist in a place where he can touch, feel and taste without any form of assistance, further surprised that Enlightment's requirement that crew members have sex twice a day.

Rimmer has sex with Commander Nirvanah Crane (Jane Horrocks). Wanting to continue the relationship, he asks the ship's captain if he can join the crew. The captain says the crew is already full but that he can win an anonymous crew member's berth through an intelligence contest. Concerned he will fail, Rimmer has Kryten give him a mind-patching operation to increase his IQ. Rimmer abandons the contest halfway through because of the patch failing, but before he is able to receive a new one, his opponent suddenly withdraws. Delighted, he bids farewell to his friends before transporting onto the Enlightment.

Once there he learns that Nirvanah was his opponent and that she sacrificed herself for his happiness. Rimmer finds himself renouncing his earlier beliefs about romance (even to his own disbelief), resigns his new commission, and returns to Red Dwarf in order to let Nirvanah be reinstated with her crew.

== Production ==
The Enlightenment's model was built by Paul McGuiness.

The episode ran 10 minutes long. One of the cut scenes showed the holoship changing shape. The transparent perspex miniature was also a casualty of the editing cut. Besides the holoship special effects, other scenes and lines were cut out or trimmed down, including many holoship crew scenes and Holly's unhelpful speech to Rimmer.

Guest stars included Jane Horrocks as Cdr. Nirvanah Crane, Matthew Marsh as Capt. Hercule Platini, Don Warrington as Cdr. Binks, Simon Paisley Day as Cdr. Randy Navarro – Number Two, Jane Montgomery as Cdr. Natalina Pushkin – Number One, and Lucy Briers as Harrison.

Grant and Naylor's script for the episode was collected in the 1995 book Son of Soup.

== Cultural references ==
- King of Kings, the story of Jesus, is mentioned by Lister as a film that Rimmer stated as unrealistic.
- Kryten references Albert Einstein in trying to convince Rimmer that he is more than his job.
- Rimmer suggests that St. Francis of Assisi said "Never give a sucker an even break". Kryten states that if so it must have been strictly off the record.

== Reception ==
Although "Holoship" was filmed third in the series, it was chosen to lead off the series as it was felt that it would draw in viewers the same way as "Camille" had done during the previous series. It worked in the sense that the viewing figures increased as the series progressed. However the episode was considered the worst in the series by fans, having a 0.2% rating on the Red Dwarf Smegazine poll. With its out-of-place moment of pathos at the end of the episode, Sci-Fi Dimensions described it as "less like Red Dwarf and more like a rejected Star Trek episode."
