= Red Dwarf VI =

Series of television

- Starring: Chris Barrie; Craig Charles; Danny John-Jules; Robert Llewellyn
- No. of episodes: 6

Release
- Original network: BBC2
- Original release: 7 October – 11 November 1993

Series chronology
- ← Previous; Red Dwarf V Next → Red Dwarf VII

Red Dwarf VI is the sixth series of the British science fiction sitcom Red Dwarf. It consisted of six episodes and was broadcast on UK television channel BBC2 between 7 October and 11 November 1993.

The series follows the crew of the spaceship Starbug, who are seeking to return to their main ship and home, the Red Dwarf. They are Dave Lister (Craig Charles), who is the only survivor of an accident on the mining ship Red Dwarf, and the last survivor of the human race, three million years in the future; a holographic reproduction of his dead bunkmate and boss, Arnold Rimmer (Chris Barrie); a sapient Cat (Danny John-Jules) who is a result of three million years' evolution, and sanitation droid Kryten (Robert Llewellyn).

The series would be the last to be written by the team of Rob Grant and Doug Naylor, who had created the show. Naylor would write subsequent episodes, with some involvement from others in VII and VIII.

== Production and writing ==
Until series V all of Red Dwarf had been directed by Ed Bye, but due to availability he was replaced by Juliet May; she struggled with some aspects of the show's requirements and was replaced by the show's creators and writers, Rob Grant and Doug Naylor during production. For series VI Grant and Naylor considered direction, but the production timeline meant this would not be feasible, and Andy de Emmony, who they had worked with on Spitting Image, was brought in to direct the series.

The series was shot at Shepperton Studios, with location footage at Bankside Power Station (for "Psirens"), Laredo Western Town in Kent for ("Gunmen of the Apocalypse), Marco Polo House (for "Legion"), and at the Shepperton backlot.

Writing of the series ran late, with only three episodes complete by the start of production; portions of the final episode, "Out of Time" were reportedly written on the day of shooting and had to be read from autocues.

For the first time in the series' history, a story arc was introduced, regarding the attempt to find Red Dwarf, and followed throughout the episodes, leading up to the series' cliffhanger.

== Cast ==
Craig Charles, Chris Barrie, Danny John-Jules and Robert Llewellyn return as Lister, the last man alive, Rimmer, a hologram of his deceased boss, the Cat, a sentient lifeform descended from his pet cat, and Kryten, a sanitation droid, respectively.

The series was set entirely on the transport ship Starbug, with Red Dwarf itself having been written out of the show. The ship's computer Holly, who had become an increasingly minor part, thus also did not appear in the series.

The first episode, "Psirens", features the return of C. P. Grogan as an illusion of Lister's love interest Kristine Kochanski, making her final appearance in the series. A psiren masquerading as Lister plays guitar in the episode; his hands are provided by Phil Manzanera of Roxy Music. Brian May of Queen had been approached but was unavailable, but this contact led to his wife Anita Dobson lobbying for a role - she played Captain Tau, another illusion. Jenny Agutter played an illusion of Kryten's creator, Professor Mamet.

The second episode, "Legion", featured only one guest, Nigel Williams, playing the eponymous Legion. "Gunmen of the Apocalypse" features a number of guests including Denis Lill as the Simulant Captain, and Liz Hickling as a simulant who would reappear in the later episode "Rimmerworld".

"Emohawk: Polymorph II" features a GELF ("genetically engineered life form") village; one of the GELFs was played by future TV chef Ainsley Harriot.

== Release and reception ==
Although the BBC had ordered the episodes for spring 1993, it delayed the broadcast of them until October and November; which would be after one of them, "Psirens", had been released in script form.

The series won the British Comedy Award for Best BBC Sitcom, and the episode "Gunmen of the Apocalypse" won an International Emmy.

Writing in 2015, Den of Geek ranked Red Dwarf VI the fourth of the then nine full seasons of the show, saying that the change in format had a "mostly successful effect", and while noting that "Emohawk: Polymorph II" did not live up to the original "Polymorph" episode praised in particular "Gunmen of the Apocalypse" as a highlight.

== Episodes ==
No. overall	No. in series	Title	Directed by	Written by	Original release date	Prod. code	Viewers (millions)
31	1	"Psirens"	Andy de Emmony	Rob Grant and Doug Naylor	7 October 1993	1	5.2
Two hundred years after investigating the SSS Esperanto, the crew awake from suspended animation aboard Starbug with amnesia, and find that their mothership Red Dwarf is missing. Chasing a faint vapour trail which may lead to their mothership, the crew travel through an asteroid field containing lost and crashed spaceships. The asteroid field is inhabited by "psirens", genetically engineered creatures that telepathically lure the ship's crew onto the asteroids so that they can suck out their brains.
32	2	"Legion"	Andy de Emmony	Rob Grant and Doug Naylor	14 October 1993	2	5.6
Chasing the vapour trail of Red Dwarf into a gas nebula, Starbug is taken over by a tractor beam which takes it to a space station. There the crew discover Legion, a highly intelligent, sophisticated and cultured lifeform conceived out of an experiment by a group of famous scientists. It is Legion who modifies Rimmer's holo-projection unit, enabling him to become a "hardlight" hologram (his jacket goes from red in "softlight" to blue in hardlight), as a result he is able to touch, feel, eat and experience pain—but still being made of light, cannot be physically harmed. They learn that Legion is composed from the minds of each member of the crew, combined and magnified, and as such they are sustaining his very existence with their presence. Legion will not allow them to leave and continue the search for Red Dwarf.
33	3	"Gunmen of the Apocalypse"	Andy de Emmony	Rob Grant and Doug Naylor	21 October 1993	4	6.0
Starbug narrowly wins a battle with "rogue simulants", but the "simulants" have infected Starbug with a computer virus and the ship is locked on a collision course with a volcanic planet. Kryten attempts to fight the virus, with the battle taking the form of an old wild west movie in his digital mind. The virus overtakes him, so Lister, Cat and Rimmer enter Kryten's wild-west dream using an artificial reality video game in attempt to help Kryten come up with an antidote.
34	4	"Emohawk: Polymorph II"	Andy de Emmony	Rob Grant and Doug Naylor	28 October 1993	5	6.3
Starbug is attacked by an advanced Space Corps enforcement probe, for looting from derelict ships. The crew manage to escape by entering GELF space but Starbug crashes on a moon. Lister must marry the GELF chieftain's daughter in exchange for an oxygen breathing unit. The crew escape with the engine part during Lister's honeymoon, but the GELF chieftain sends his pet, a polymorph, after them to retrieve his new son-in-law.
35	5	"Rimmerworld"	Andy de Emmony	Rob Grant and Doug Naylor	4 November 1993	3	6.2
The crew return to the wreck of the simulants' battleship to salvage for food supplies but are confronted by a surviving simulant who threatens to kill herself and the crew. Rimmer, who has been diagnosed with a tense nervous disorder, escapes in a pod which has no steering, and is whisked away through a worm-hole and crashes on a planet. The crew follow Rimmer through the worm-hole, but due to its effects arrive at the planet 600 years after Rimmer arrived, only to find the planet is populated with thousands of Rimmer clones.
36	6	"Out of Time"	Andy de Emmony	Rob Grant and Doug Naylor	11 November 1993	6	6.3
Starbug enters an artificial fog containing devices that create false realities. Persevering through it, the crew find what it is hiding—a time machine. Shortly after, they meet their future selves, from fifteen years later. The crew learn that their future selves are incredibly corrupt and amoral through abuse of the time drive, to experience the "very best" of history. In the end, the two Starbug craft engage in a space battle to end all space battles.
