= Back to Reality (Red Dwarf) =

- Red Dwarf episode
- Episode no.: Series 5 Episode 6
- Directed by: Juliet May and Grant Naylor
- Written by: Rob Grant and Doug Naylor
- Original air date: 26 March 1992

Guest appearances
- Timothy Spall as Andy; Lenny Von Dohlen as Cop; Marie McCarthy as Nurse; John Sharian as New Lister; Anastasia Hille as New Kochanski; Julian Lyon as New Rimmer; David Lemkin as New Cat; Scott Charles Bennett as New Kryten

Episode chronology
← Previous "Demons & Angels"	Next → "Psirens"
- Red Dwarf V

"Back to Reality" is the sixth and final episode of the fifth series of science fiction sitcom Red Dwarf and the 30th in the series' run. It was first broadcast on the British television channel BBC2 on 26 March 1992, and was written by Rob Grant and Doug Naylor and directed by Juliet May and Grant Naylor.

The plot features the crew waking up after a crash to discover that the last four years of their lives has been spent in a "Total Immersion Video Game" called Red Dwarf. This episode marks the final appearance of Hattie Hayridge as Holly. The episode often tops polls and surveys as the best episode in the entire series.

== Plot ==
Dave Lister (Craig Charles), Arnold Rimmer (Chris Barrie), Kryten (Robert Llewellyn) and the Cat (Danny John-Jules) take a Starbug to investigate the wreckage of a ship called SSS Esperanto on an ocean-covered moon. The group discover that the ship was conducting marine seeding experiments that included accelerating the evolution of life on the planet, but find that all life on board, and even some of the sea life, had committed suicide. Kryten discovers this was caused by a mutated form of squid ink that contained a hallucinogenic nerve toxin, and that the suicides were caused by the toxin giving its victims severe depression, stating that he, Lister and Cat are now being affected by it. Finding that the ink may have come from the only remaining life form on the moon, a giant squid, the group attempt to escape it, but crash Starbug and are killed in the explosion. A moment later, the crew awaken from Artificial Reality machines and discover that they have been playing "Red Dwarf – The Total Immersion Video Game" for four years, gaining a score of only 4%, and that the return to reality has left them with temporary memory loss.

The group discover who they are in time—Lister is Voter Colonel Sebastian Doyle, head of the secret police in a fascist state; Rimmer is Billy Doyle, Lister's half-brother and a tramp; Cat is Duane Dibbley, a dorky human; and Kryten is Detective Jake Bullet, a half-human traffic officer. The group feel despair at finding out who they are, Kryten initially being pleased at his "real" existence until he is forced to take a human life to save another, and prepare to commit group suicide. However, before they do this, Holly (Hattie Hayridge) manages to wake them up, revealing that they are still onboard Starbug—their crash and the "reality" they were in were just a hallucination. Holly and Kryten deduce that the squid was the culprit: a Despair Squid which used ink to induce despair in other species and make them commit suicide. Holly confirms that she has killed the squid, and Starbug leaves the planet.

== Production ==
"Back to Reality" was the first script written for series 5, and it was thought of at the time that this would be the final series as there looked like there would be a cast availability problem: Chris Barrie was starring in the increasingly popular sitcom Brittas Empire, while Robert Llewellyn was appearing in Red Dwarf USA, a Red Dwarf pilot commissioned by American production company NBC, with the possibility of being committed to that for several years.

Although the budget for the series had increased, certain sets were still able to double for different scenes. The corridors of the holoship, from the episode of the same name, were adapted for the Artificial Reality suite.

The interiors of the SSS Esperanto were filmed at Sunbury Pumphouse, and were the only scenes directed by Juliet May.

Several model shots of the Despair Squid were filmed but it was decided that they did not work well. Instead, a superimposed shadow was used to illustrate the squid closing in on Starbug.

Lenny Von Dohlen, known for appearing in Twin Peaks, agreed to appear as a policeman after speaking with former guest star Frances Barber (who appeared in the series 3 episode, "Polymorph", as the Jenny Mutant). The episode also featured a new Red Dwarf crew for the new Artificial Reality game. Anastasia Hille, in her first-ever TV role, played Kochanski, David Lemkin played the Cat, Julian Lyon played Rimmer, John Sharian played Lister and Scott Charles Bennett played Kryten. Timothy Spall and Marie McCarthy played two employees, a staff worker named Andy and a nurse, respectively, attending to the 'Red Dwarf Total Immersion Video Game'.

Grant and Naylor's script for the episode was collected in the 1993 book Primordial Soup.

== Reception ==
The episode was originally broadcast on the British television channel BBC2 on 26 March 1992.

It topped the Red Dwarf Smegazine poll of all 30 then-existing episodes in 1992. At the end of 1992 the episode helped the fifth series gain a nomination for an International Emmy Award.

Reviewed in 2005 for its DVD release, David Blair said that it was "one of the best and most clever episodes ever made—here we see the birth of Dwane Dibbly—'nuff said."

A 2010 book described it as a "classic episode [that] questions our certainty about what is real. It has us believing that what we thought was real was only a simulation of dream, only to reveal later on that the waking up was actually a falling asleep."

Writing in 2017, Sophie Davies of CultBox said the episode "frequently tops lists of the greatest Red Dwarf episodes and it isn't difficult to see why." Tom Salisky, writing in his 2024 book about the show, said that the episode "is one hell of a big swing and it's pulled off exceptionally well", and concludes "This is a truly incredible half hour of television, doing far more with the format than I’d ever believed was possible."
