= Steven Wickham =

British actor

Steven Wickham is a British actor known largely for his roles in Big Finish Productions' audio dramas as well as guest appearances in Red Dwarf, Mrs Brown's Boys, Casualty, The Bill, EastEnders and Doctor Who in a career which began in 1984.

== Career ==
Steven Wickham began his career after leaving college and joining a theatre in education group called Bucket Theatre, touring schools in Buckinghamshire, performing at one occasion for The Princess Anne.

For 18 months, he played The Baker in Bill Kenwright's memorable national tour of Joseph and the Amazing Technicolour Dreamcoat, and many theatre jobs followed. This includes playing Judas in a national tour of Godspell, Big Jule in Guys and Dolls at the Everyman Theatre, Cheltenham, Reuben Starkadder in Cold Comfort Farm at the Watermill Theatre, Newbury, Oscar Wilde in The Mirror of the Moon at the Edinburgh Festival, and Hiram Otis in the national tour of The Canterville Ghost opposite Ron Moody. He has played in such diverse roles as Hamlet and Abanazar, Mr Peachum and Lady Bracknell. In the autumn of 2016 he played Major Watson opposite Brian Capron in a UK-wide tour of the R. C. Sherriff thriller Home at Seven.

He has made many television appearances from EastEnders, to Heartbeat from London's Burning to The Bill (four separate times) and from Outside Edge to Casualty (twice). In a 1993 episode (Emohawk: Polymorph II) of Red Dwarf he appeared as a GELF set to marry the leading protagonist Dave Lister and it garnered him some cult notoriety. He became the only character other than the four primary regulars to appear in the title sequence. Nineteen years later he reappeared on Red Dwarf X (episode Entangled), this time playing the chief of a group of Biologically Engineered Garbage Gobblers.

In 2010, he started alongside Rufus Hound in the CBBC sitcom Hounded, starring as the character Future Rufus in all 13 episodes, as well as playing a Russian conker champion in an episode of Hotel Trubble and Mr Cobb in the Little Britain spin-off Come Fly with Me with David Walliams and Matt Lucas.

In May 2013, he filmed the role of Santa Claus for the Christmas special episode of Mrs Brown's Boys, the most watched TV programme on Christmas Day.

He has made many commercials for many countries including for Israel, Germany, the Netherlands, Italy, Norway and the UK – most recently being Santa in the Littlewoods 2013 campaign, and Santa for a Schweppes Tonic campaign, and for Media Markt in Germany. For Christmas 2015, he played Santa in the Lloyds Bank/Applepay commercial. For Christmas 2016, he played Santa Claus (Babbo Natale) for the TIM network in Italy, in three major commercials and an advertising campaign. In 2017, he again played Santa for an advertising campaign for Tempo Tissues, and filmed the role of real life policeman Chief Inspector Shelley Symes for 'Murder Maps', a true crimes documentary series for Netflix (USA/Canada) and UKTV Play, in a dramatisation of the acid bath murders of John George Haigh. For Autumn 2018, Steven played the Town Crier in commercials and newspaper advertisements for the Health Lottery Mega Raffle Draw. Recent Tv work includes playing a mysterious stranger in the BBC comedy drama 'Click and Collect' with Stephen Merchant, and playing a nasty neighbour and Father Christmas in two episodes of the CBBC comedy show 'Andy and the Band'.

For Christmas 2017, Steven was thrilled to give his time, appearing as Santa at the Christmas party for the survivors of the Grenfell Tower tragedy, and the surrounding community.

He and has appeared in over 40 Big Finish Audio dramas, in many guises, most notably Doggles (under the pseudonym of Sam Stevens) and Joseph in the Bernice Summerfield series and Chancellor Valyes in the Gallifrey series. He recently provided a voice for the new Nickelodeon children's animated series HexVet.

He can be seen as the mysterious Town Crier in the recent movie from the team behind the Nativity movies, Christmas on Mistletoe Farm, showing on Netflix. He has also made frequent appearances in online advertising campaigns for Experian.

== Audio career ==
Big Finish Doctor Who Audio Dramas

- Phantasmagoria (as Dr. Samuel Holywell)
- The Fires of Vulcan (as Murranus)
- The Dark Flame (as Joseph/Victor)
- Son of the Dragon (as various characters)
- The Veiled Leopard (as Gavin Walker)
- Red (as Uviol)
- Urban Myths (as Harom)
- Seven Keys to Doomsday (as The Master of Karn/Garm)
- The Settling (as Turner)
- Memories of a Tyrant (as Grisk/Venorg)

'Pathfinder Legends'

- Fortress of the Stone Giants (as Longtooth the Dragon)
- Spires of Xin-Shalast (as Ghost Dwarf)
- Secrets of the Sphinx (as Erayu)

Bernice Summerfield Series

- Walking to Babylon (as The Drone)
- The Greatest Shop in the Galaxy
- The Green-Eyed Monsters
- The Mirror Effect
- The Bellotron Incident
- The Draconian Rage
- Death and the Daleks
- The Grel Escape
- The Crystal of Cantus
- The Tartarus Gate
- Summer of Love
- The Judas Gift
- Freedom of Information
- The Final Amendment
- The Wake
- Escaping the Future
- Resurrecting the Past
- Many Happy Returns

Sarah Jane Smith

- The Tao Connection (as Mr Sharpe)

Gallifrey

- Lies
- Fractures
- Warfare
- Appropriation
- Mindbomb
- Panacea
- Forever
- Emancipation
- Acsension (All as Chancellor Valyes)

Judge Dredd

- Get Karter! (as Harry Karter)

Iris Wildthyme

- The Land of Wonder (as Professor Ramsbottom)

James Follett's Mindwarp (as Mr Belan/The chairman)

== Television and filmography ==
- Ant & Dec's Limitless Win - Christmas 2025 (Santa) - ITV
- Christmas on Mistletoe Farm (Town Crier) - Netflix (2022)
- Andy and the Band - Save Christmas - CBBC (2020)
- Andy and the Band - Can I Have My Ball Back? - CBBC (2019)
- Click & Collect - BBC (2018)
- Murder Maps – Netflix/UKTV Play (2017)
- Mrs Brown's Boys – BBC (2013)
- Miss Wright – Sky Living/ITV (2012)
- Red Dwarf X - "Entangled" (Chief BEGG) – Dave (2012)
- Red Dwarf VI - "Emohawk: Polymorph II" (GELF Bride) - BBC (1993)
- Come Fly With Me (2010)
- Hounded – CBBC (2010)
- Hotel Trubble – CBBC (2010)
- The Wrong Door (2008)
  - "The Wizard of Office"
  - "Lose Weight Now"
- Casualty (2002–2006)
  - "The Sunny Side of the Street: Part 2"
  - "The Sunny Side of the Street: Part 1"
  - "What Becomes of the BrokenHearted"
- Time Trumpet (2006)
- EastEnders (2004)
- Chocolate – Bollywood movie
- 'Orrible
- Ellington
- Outside Edge
- Chandler and Co.
- The Knock
- London's Burning
- The Bill (Four episode)
- Doctors
- Heartbeat
- Red Dwarf
- Doctor Who
  - "The Twin Dilemma" (Giant Gastropod)
  - "The Caves of Androzani" (Planetary Soldier)
