= Gunmen of the Apocalypse =

- Red Dwarf episode
- Episode no.: Series 6 Episode 3
- Directed by: Andy de Emmony
- Written by: Rob Grant; Doug Naylor
- Original air date: 21 October 1993

Guest appearances
- Denis Lill as Simulant Captain/Death; Liz Hickling as Simulant Lieutenant; Jennifer Calvert as Loretta; Imogen Bain as Lola; Steve Devereaux as Jimmy; Robert Inch as War; Jeremy Peters as Pestilence; Dinny Powell as Famine; Stephen Marcus as Bear Strangler McGee

Episode chronology
← Previous "Legion"	Next → "Emohawk: Polymorph II"
- Red Dwarf VI

"Gunmen of the Apocalypse" is the third episode of the sixth series of the science fiction sitcom Red Dwarf. It was first broadcast on 21 October 1993, on BBC Two, and went on to win an International Emmy Award. The episode was written by Rob Grant and Doug Naylor, and directed by Andy de Emmony. In the episode, the regular cast find themselves in a computer simulation of a Wild West town, facing a gunfight against the Four Horsemen of the Apocalypse.

== Plot ==
Dave Lister (Craig Charles) takes delight in using a salvaged functioning artificial reality (AR) machine to have sex with various female game characters, but is forced by Kryten (Robert Llewellyn) to suspend his latest endeavour. Reuniting with Cat (Danny John-Jules) and Rimmer (Chris Barrie), Lister learns that Starbug has strayed into a Rogue Simulant hunting zone. Despite the crew's best efforts, the ship is discovered by a battle-cruiser of xenophobic simulants that despise humanity, and promptly capture the crew after they fail to deceive them. After being knocked unconscious, the crew awaken to find the simulants have upgraded their systems, weapons and armour, intending to battle them for sport, but managed to get destroyed by the crew through pure luck. Before their destruction, the simulants' leader has Starbug infected with an "Armageddon Virus", locking the ship on a suicide course with a large volcanic moon. Kryten infects himself with the virus in order to begin creating a "dove" anti-virus program to counter it, advising the others to watch his dreams.

The group find Kryten combating the virus within a Wild West dream, in which the mechanoid is a burnt-out sheriff in a town called Existence, with the virus operating as an outlaw gang called the Apocalypse Boys, consisting of Famine (Dinny Powell), Pestilence (Jeremy Peters), War (Robert Inch), and Death (Denis Lill). Seeing him losing, Lister, Rimmer and Cat opt to help him by entering his dream through the AR machine, utilising the abilities of characters from a Wild West-styled video game. Upon arriving and getting Kryten to recognise them, the trio distract the Apocalypse Boys to give him time to create his antidote, escaping the dream when the virus infects the AR machine and takes away their characters' special abilities. Kryten successfully completes the programme, cleansing himself of the virus, before using it to free the ship from the virus' control. Starbug plunges into the moon, but resurfaces a few seconds later unscathed, with the crew giving an appropriate "Yeeha!" before flying off into the sunset.

== Production ==
Written by Rob Grant and Doug Naylor, the script was originally titled "The Four Horsemen of the Apocalypse", and then had the working title of "High Midnight"; it was later changed to "Gunmen of the Apocalypse". The Western themes of the episode were written first, with the plot framing with the Simulants coming later, and described by Grant and Naylor as a "roast beef western" (parodying the phrase 'Spaghetti Western').

It was filmed at Laredo, a Wild West reenactment town in Kent. During filming of the episode, Janet Street-Porter was Head of Art & Culture at the BBC. When she received the ambitious script for "Gunmen..." she sent out a memo that all production for the episode be stopped immediately, because she believed it too difficult to film. By the time the Red Dwarf crew received her memo, filming had already wrapped.

Denis Lill appears as the Simulant Captain and Death. The other 'Apocalypse Boys' were played by Dinny Powell, Robert Inch and Jeremy Peters playing Famine, War and Pestilence respectively. Jennifer Calvert plays the 'Artificial Reality' character in Lister's detective scenario. Steve Devereaux plays Jimmy. Liz Hickling appears as Simulant Lieutenant, Imogen Bain plays Lola and Stephen Marcus plays Bear Strangler McGee.

Grant and Naylor's script for the episode was collected in the 1995 book Son of Soup.

== Reception ==
The episode was first broadcast on the British television channel BBC2 on 21 October 1993, and was watched by just under 6 million people.

It has been described as "the best episode of Series VI". One reviewer described the episode as "an excuse to transport the characters to a Wild West landscape, with results just as contrived as those on the original Star Trek but considerably funnier."

Writing in 2017 for CultBox, Sophie Davies said that it is "certainly enjoyable, but I would argue that it isn't really the 'best' or 'second best' episode of all time, as it's often said to be, and that perhaps the reason it stands out in people's minds so much is because it has a memorable setting."

The episode won an International Emmy award in 1994.

== See also ==
- Backwards, the fourth Red Dwarf novel by Rob Grant, features plot elements from the episode
