= Reset button technique =

Plot device that resets continuity in works of fiction

The reset button technique (based on the idea of status quo ante) is a plot device for interrupting continuity in works of fiction. The reset button device is used to return all characters and situations to the status quo prior to some major change. It can be employed in the middle of a program to negate some portion of what came before. It is often used in science fiction television series, animated series, soap operas, and comic books. The reset button technique accommodates dramatic changes to characters and the fictional universe that might otherwise invalidate the show's premise with respect to future episodes or other plot details. For example, writers may use the device to improve the audience's experience of the lead character's death, which is usually impossible without effectively ending the work or significantly altering its course.

== One-off use ==
The effective use of this device in productions where it is not typically featured relies heavily on the audience's suspension of disbelief until the precise moment when the reset button technique is employed. The successful execution of this technique needs the introduction of plot developments that significantly alter the course of the show, without indicating that continuity will be disrupted. Often employed as a plot twist, the reset button technique serves to undo all the preceding events of an episode. This device draws inspiration from science fiction and metaphysical concepts and is frequently included in those genres.

Examples of the reset button technique include dream sequences, alternate-history flashbacks, parallel universes, alternate realities, alternate timelines, daydreams, time travel, and hallucinations. In one trope that uses this technique (typically in science fiction or fantasy), a character will find themselves in a situation that seems familiar, but during the episode, some things seem odd. Then one or more major events happen, such as the death of a lead character. By the end of the episode or story arc, the character realizes that they have been placed in a copy of their normal surroundings, usually to try to obtain information from them, and that the mastermind behind the plan made a few mistakes in fashioning the copied environment.

One popular example of the reset button technique is the 1986 season premiere of Dallas in which it is revealed that Bobby Ewing's death in the previous season was merely a dream in the mind of one of the characters. This was parodied in the "Da Boom" episode of Family Guy. In comics, the Spider-Man storyline Spider-Man: One More Day undid the marriage of Peter Parker and Mary Jane Watson, drawing criticism due to the continuity issues, with some critics even comparing it to Dallas.

When used appropriately, however, it can be devastating in terms of its effect. Near the end of the series finale of Newhart, innkeeper Dick Loudon (portrayed by Bob Newhart) is struck on the head and knocked unconscious. The scene switches abruptly to Dr. Bob Hartley, the character Newhart portrayed in his earlier series, The Bob Newhart Show, waking up in bed next to his wife Emily (portrayed by Suzanne Pleshette). Hartley describes the strange dream he has just had about running a Vermont inn, which Emily blames on the Japanese food he ate before going to bed. The entirety of Newhart is thus established to be part of Hartley's dream.

== Use as a frequent plot device ==
In many series, the reset button trope is used as a standard, and frequently explicit, plot device.

Implicit usage of the technique can be seen in episodic fiction, such as when the results of episodes regularly cause what would seem to be massive changes in the status of characters and their world, but it is understood by the audience that subsequent episodes will not consider such events. An example is South Park, in which the character of Kenny dies in almost every episode in early seasons, only to reappear in future episodes without explanation.

The Simpsons is one show that generally uses this technique, while occasionally introducing lasting continuity changes. Creator Matt Groening referred to this flexibility as a "rubber band reality".

Shows using the reset-button technique sometimes point out, as a form of self-referential humor, their own use of the device.

Alluding to the trope, the CBBC television series Hounded features a literal reset button that, at the end of each episode, rewinds the entire day's events back to the beginning.

== See also ==
- Canon (fiction)
- Deus ex machina
- Retroactive continuity
- Reboot (fiction)
