= Hounded (TV series) =

- Genre: Children's; Science fiction; Fantasy; Comedy
- Written by: Matt Brito; Caimh McDonnell; John Warburton; Paula Hines
- Starring: Rufus Hound; Colin McFarlane; Nadine Marshall; Steven Wickham; Eva Alexander; Colin Ryan
- Opening theme: "Goodbye Mr. A" by The Hoosiers
- Country of origin: United Kingdom
- Original language: English
- No. of series: 1
- No. of episodes: 13

Production
- Running time: 30 minutes

Original release
- Network: CBBC
- Release: 11 June – 3 September 2010

Hounded is a CBBC sitcom starring Rufus Hound. The comedian is chased through space and time by the evil Dr Muhahaha and his female assistant, Steve.

== Plot summary ==
A typical episode starts with Rufus reluctantly getting out of bed and walking to the BBC Television Centre where he will be filmed as a co-presenter on an episode of FunLab, a live science-based children's show. Every time he is introduced incorrectly by FunLab presenters Gill (calling him amongst others Randoff, Ricky, Randy and Richard) and Barry, to whom he gives a different answer to the question "That's odd. Have I met you before?" each day. He begins presenting a different experiment, often related to the theme of the show, when his future self (referred to as 'my meddling future self' by Rufus) turns up and transports himself and Rufus into his time (at the park) and presents Rufus with a few ordinary objects, usually to his discontent, but these objects, such as a tin of cat food or a rubber ball, later turn out to be exactly what Rufus will require later in the episode.

Rufus is sucked into a parallel universe where television and movie special effects are part of everyday life. It's a world inhabited by evil but incompetent "genius" Dr Muhahaha, ruler of the Multiverse, who is trying to take over the Earth, and his (according to Rufus, 'geeky') sidekick Steve. In each episode Rufus again meets Gill and Barry as different characters (but usually called Gelina and Buck) who help him.

Developed by the team behind BBC Three's innovative sketch show The Wrong Door, Rufus must thwart Dr Muhahaha and find his way home. At the end of each adventure, Dr. Muhahaha is successfully thwarted, but presses a button that rewinds time and Rufus crashes back into his own universe, finding himself back in his flat about to start the same fateful day again. Just before he enters the Television Centre at the beginning of each episode, Rufus always says 'You never know, maybe one day I'll wake up and it might be tomorrow' (or at the very least, he'll remember about an offscreen bird that defecates on him).

== Home media ==
The complete series was released onto DVD on 26 July 2010.

Certain episodes can also be found on YouTube.

== Cast ==
- Rufus Hound - Rufus Hound
- Colin McFarlane - Dr Muhahaha
- Nadine Marshall - Steve
- Steven Wickham - Future Rufus
- Eva Alexander - Gill
- Colin Ryan - Barry
