= Incompetence (novel) =

2003 novel by Rob Grant

- First edition cover
- Author: Rob Grant
- Language: English
- Genre: Science fiction, Comic novel
- Publication date: 2003
- Publication place: United Kingdom
- Media type: Print Hardback
- Pages: 291
- ISBN: 978-0-575-07449-1
- OCLC: 56659157

Incompetence is a dystopian comedy novel by Red Dwarf co-creator Rob Grant, first published in 2003 with the tag line "Bad is the new Good." It is a murder mystery and political thriller set in a near-future federal Europe where no-one can be "prejudiced from employment for reason of age, race, creed or incompitence [sic]". Consequently, much of the population demonstrates an extreme lack of competence in their occupations.

The novel tells the story of a detective working for an unnamed secret agency, with a variety of identities within various law enforcement agencies (two examples being Europol and the Police Corruption Investigation Department). His real name remains a mystery, but he commonly uses the pseudonym Harry Salt. The story starts with the apparent death of his former mentor (Klingferm) in an apparent elevator accident. He suspects foul play, and his investigations lead him around various states of Europe. In the course of these investigations, he seems to be tracked by an unknown stalker. On the way, he is hindered by the fact that practically everyone he meets has a serious character flaw and/or mental deficiency. Another ongoing problem is his inability to acquire or hang onto a decent pair of shoes, primarily as all shoes in the "United States of Europe" are made of vegetable matter. A number of new mental disorders have apparently been classified in the book's universe, such as Sexually Inappropriate Response and Non-Specific Stupidity.

Examples of incompetence in the world around the agent are:

- Records that are incomplete, contradict other documents, or are simply false (such as death certificates issued for living people).
- Police who obliterate all evidence by walking casually through a crime scene.
- Inaccurate local guides and transport.
- People who cannot work the basic equipment they are paid to use.

The plot appears to be based on the film The Third Man. The film is mentioned in the drunken conversation between Salt and Klingferm near the start of the book.

== Characters ==
- Harry Salt/Harry Tequila/Harry Pepper/Cardew Vascular: The main protagonist. Years of dealing with stupidity have left him somewhat cynical. One of the few characters who is not incompetent or intellectually disabled, he has learnt to exploit society's incompetence to aid his investigations. He seems to be one of very few people who can do anything well, although he remarks that most people who do get nowhere, which may be one of the reasons he has learned to hate his job to the point where he resigns at the end of the book. Harry's real name is not given, although his mentor Klingferm refers to him as Harry Salt. His pseudonyms are compromised throughout the novel.
- Dick Klingferm: Harry's former mentor and fellow agent. During the story, he is presumed dead when an elevator supposedly kills him along with several other people. Harry tracks down his killer, only to find out it to be Klingferm himself. He explains he is a deep undercover American agent out to destroy any possibilities of the United States of Europe expanding to include Russia. Harry electrocutes Klingferm, then shoots him in the head, blowing out a large piece of his brain.
- Captain Zuccho: An Italian police captain who, by his own admission, sometimes becomes "a bit too frisky"; he has serious difficulty controlling his anger, even at one point firing off several rounds from his gun when asked to calm down. Although often irrational and angry he has been shown to genuinely desire to uphold the law and his anger is often a result of believing his work is being interfered with. His overreaction make him appear less rational but to Harry's surprise he is not without some skills as a police officer he is able to track Harry down when he discovers his I.D's are fake and again when he does not show up for his trial after being given bail. He witnesses Harry and Klingferm's encounter and is able to intervene. He never fully learns about who Harry works for but agrees to forget about the encounter. He is reputedly on prozac, but despite this he is still unable to control his anger. He eventually saves Harry's life at the end, with even more swearing.
- Gina Pallister: A guest liaison who suffers from SIR (Sexually Inappropriate Response), and an object of Harry's lust. Harry initially believes her to be a figment of his imagination, but realises that he doesn't have "that good an imagination". Harry manages to convince her to go out on a date, but fails to turn up because he is arrested. At the end of the book, however, Harry states that he has "a date so hot, it could cut through bank vaults", implying that he managed to convince her to go on another date. Gina is showing to desire to do a good job in her role and worries her condition makes her bad at it.
- Mamma: An old woman who was widowed when the authorities declared her (still-living) husband legally dead. She helps heal Harry during his ordeal (such as jumping out of a car, and being almost CPRed to death) with a special soup and bandages, akin to voodoo. Later it's revealed the meat inside the soup is actually inspectors sent to her farm.
- Pappa: Mamma's (late) husband. A clerical error resulted in him being legally dead. He was going to protest about this, but after welfare cheques and compensation came through, he agreed to live in the shed instead, resentfully defending his existence. Harry eventually gives him his false identity of Cadrew Vascular to enable him to be a "living" person again.
- Twinkle: A 100+ year old male lap dancer hired by Klingferm to meet with Harry; this was actually a ruse to lead Harry into Klingferm's trap.
- Wolfie: A professional henchman with very bad breath and a fondness for sadism. His weapons of choice are a stiletto blade, a Derringer pistol (which Harry surmises is only useful for shooting people in the eye sockets at point blank range), and a police stun baton with the safety removed, making its charge incredibly powerful. Harry kills him by driving his nose into his brain.
- Dr Rutter: A coroner whose hobbies include stitching faces to the buttocks of cadavers.
- Hinton Wheeler: An ex legal assistant who visited a prison Harry was incarcerated in. Apparently he is 'not meant to be there'. He describes the events as coming to visit a client, then finding out the company had fired him, so his pass to leave wasn't valid, but he had not committed a crime and so could not be imprisoned to be released, thereby being stuck. Harry solves the problem by making him assault one of the guards to commit a crime, and he thanks Harry as he gets electrocuted and beaten.

== See also ==
- Idiocracy
- Harrison Bergeron
