= The Strangerers =

British short-lived science fiction comedy-drama television series

- Title screen
- Genre: Comedy drama Science fiction
- Created by: Rob Grant
- Written by: Rob Grant
- Directed by: Liddy Oldroyd; Nick Wood
- Starring: Mark Williams; Jack Docherty; Sarah Alexander; Mark Heap; Milton Jones; Morwenna Banks; David Walliams; Paul Darrow; Doon Mackichan
- Country of origin: United Kingdom
- Original language: English
- No. of series: 1
- No. of episodes: 9

Production
- Camera setup: Single-camera setup
- Running time: 60 minutes (Episode 1); 30 minutes (Episodes 2–9)
- Production companies: Absolutely Television; Taken for Granted Productions Ltd.

Original release
- Network: Sky One
- Release: 15 February – 11 April 2000

The Strangerers is a British television comedy-drama science fiction series written by Rob Grant (best known as co-creator of Red Dwarf) and was broadcast on Sky One between 15 February and 11 April 2000.

A single series was made with a total of nine episodes (the first being one hour in length and the rest 30 minutes each). The show ended on a cliffhanger. It was cancelled and a second series was never produced. It has not been released on DVD, nor repeated since its original run.

== Background ==
The show was conceived as Sky One's first original comedy series, developed in the wake of the channel losing the broadcasting rights to Friends, which had moved to Channel 4. Sky invested £300,000 per episode and granted the creators full creative autonomy. Creator and writer Rob Grant initially pitched the show to the BBC, but they declined, having recently acquired the rights to broadcast the similar American sci-fi sitcom 3rd Rock from the Sun.

== Plot ==
The story centres on two alien agents, Cadet Flynn and Pseudo-Cadet Niven. They are incredibly advanced and evolved vegetables on a fact finding mission to Earth, where they take on human form. Their supervisor is accidentally decapitated shortly after arrival, leaving the cadets to fend for themselves. Through the course of the series the aliens discover the intricacies of basic needs, like eating, sleeping and how to purchase things, usually doing so in their own idiosyncratic manner.

Their exact whereabouts on Earth is something of a mystery. The society in which they find themselves bears some resemblance to both Britain and America, and there are hints that a totalitarian government is in charge. There are also street gangs parodying those in A Clockwork Orange. Two agents and their apparently psychopathic commander try to capture the aliens. The aliens repeatedly escape, but not without suffering occasional injuries themselves.

== Cast ==
- Mark Williams as Cadet Flynn
- Jack Docherty as Cadet Niven
- Sarah Alexander as Rina
- Mark Heap as Harry
- Milton Jones as The Supervisor
- Morwenna Banks as The Super-Supervisor
- Paul Darrow as C.D.
- David Walliams as Rats
- John Sparkes as Bilbo
- Doon Mackichan as Galdriel
- Meera Syal as Volunteer
- Kulvinder Ghir as Keith
- Mike Hayley as Irius Mann

== Episodes ==
No.	Title	Directed by	Written by	Original release date	Viewers (millions)
1	"Space Cadets"	Liddy Oldroyd	Rob Grant	15 February 2000	0.73
Three aliens arrive on Earth and attempt to blend in with humans, relying solely on outdated information gleaned from early television broadcasts.
2	"Vegetables"	Liddy Oldroyd	Rob Grant	22 February 2000	N/A (<0.68) (Note: Not reported in the weekly top 10 programmes for Sky One.)
3	"Crunchy Munchy"	Liddy Oldroyd	Rob Grant	29 February 2000	N/A (<0.63)
4	"Fargle"	Liddy Oldroyd	Rob Grant	7 March 2000	N/A (<0.74)
5	"Zap Type 'Z'"	Nick Wood	Rob Grant	14 March 2000	N/A (<0.69)
6	"Angels"	Nick Wood	Rob Grant	21 March 2000	N/A (<0.64)
7	"The Streets of Laredo"	Nick Wood	Rob Grant	28 March 2000	N/A (<0.65)
8	"Eyepoppers"	Nick Wood	Rob Grant	4 April 2000	N/A (<0.63)
9	"The Getawaying"	Nick Wood	Rob Grant	11 April 2000	N/A (<0.68)

== International broadcasts ==
The show was picked up by Australian television subscription service Foxtel and broadcast on The Comedy Channel, who described it as "silly and very funny".

== See also ==
- 2000 in British television
