= Samantha Robson =

English actress

Samantha Jane Robson (born 22 March 1966 in Wandsworth, London) is an English actress best known for playing WPC Vicky Hagen in The Bill from 1998 to 2001.

In 1993 she made her TV debut in Red Dwarf as Pete Tranter's sister in the episode "Psirens". In 2002 she appeared in the crime drama series Murder in Mind.
