= Murder in Mind (TV series) =

- Genre: Crime drama Thriller
- Created by: Anthony Horowitz
- Theme music composer: Brian Bennett
- Country of origin: United Kingdom
- Original language: English
- No. of series: 3
- No. of episodes: 23

Production
- Executive producers: Mal Young; Christopher Moss
- Producer: Paul Knight
- Cinematography: John Simmons
- Editor: Nigel Parkes
- Running time: 60 minutes
- Production company: Paul Knight Productions

Original release
- Network: BBC One
- Release: 22 April 2001 – 29 June 2003

Murder in Mind was a British television anthology series of self-contained stories, each with a murderous theme, seen from the perspective of the murderer. The series was created by Anthony Horowitz, and broadcast on BBC One from 22 April 2001 to 29 June 2003.

Murder in Mind featured different actors in every episode, and ran for a total of three series, incorporating 23 episodes. A nine-disc DVD boxset, containing all three series, was released in June 2005.

== Episodes ==
=== Series overview ===
Series	Episodes	Originally released	
Series	Episodes	First released	Last released
1	7	22 April 2001	17 June 2001
2	8	5 January 2002	28 May 2002
3	8	25 January 2003	29 June 2003

=== Series 1 (2001) ===
No.	Title	Directed by	Written by	Original release date	Viewers (millions)
1	"Teacher"	Coky Giedroyc	Anthony Horowitz	22 April 2001	6.92
Edward Palmer (Suchet) is a respected headmaster at a state boys' school. However, a minor indiscretion in his personal life on a council estate leads to an accidental but horrific crime. One night, Palmer approaches a rent boy for sex, but quickly realises that he has made a terrible mistake. The rent boy pulls a knife, demanding cash, but in a struggle he is killed. There is worse to come for Palmer: he was seen – and there is evidence at the murder scene that makes him an easy target for blackmail. His only daughter, Catrin (Kearney), a nurse, has a plan. Can Palmer, a pillar of the community, take the law into his own hands, or, after battling with his own conscience, will he pursue even more desperate measures? Starring David Suchet and Gillian Kearney
2	"Flame"	Nick Jones	Stephen Leather	29 April 2001	6.99
A firefighter (McFadden) discovers that his wife is having an affair with his colleague and is in the process of seeking a divorce. He is approached by a "problem-solver", James Napeworth (Allen), who offers him a solution. Starring Steve McFadden and Keith Allen
3	"Motive"	Frank W. Smith	Anthony Horowitz	6 May 2001	5.48
A couple (Harker and Dinsdale) decide to murder their babysitter. But what, if any, are their motives for doing so and can they cover up the crime? Starring Susannah Harker and Reece Dinsdale
4	"Mercy"	Ferdinand Fairfax	Anthony Horowitz	20 May 2001	6.35
Dr. Collins (West) has helped his wife Margaret (Parfitt) with a so-called assisted suicide. To the police, he is a suspect. To the public, Dr. Collins is a hero. But what is the truth? Starring Timothy West, Judy Parfitt and John Gordon Sinclair
5	"Vigilante"	Frank W. Smith	Stephen Leather	3 June 2001	5.32
A police officer (Kelsey) and two mates pay a visit to a man, accused of being a "paedophile" by the local press, intending to obtain the location of a local missing girl. However, events quickly spiral out of control and loyalties are put to the test. Starring Ian Kelsey and Tim Healy
6	"Neighbours"	Ferdinand Fairfax	Simon Sharkey	10 June 2001	8.06
The Squires (Thompson and van Outen) move in next door to Nigel (Whately) and Joanne (Goodall) Liddy and start making their lives a suburban nightmare. Eventually, Nigel's patience starts wearing out and he decides to take action. Starring Kevin Whately, Caroline Goodall, John Thomson and Denise van Outen
7	"Sleeper"	David Innes Edwards	Guy Burt	17 June 2001	6.41
Deborah (Hawes) suffers sleep terrors and is prone to sleepwalking, and it is severely affecting her relationships and studies. After she suspects her boyfriend of cheating, he leaves. The next morning, Deborah wakes up with blood on her clothes and next to a blood-stained hammer. Starring Keeley Hawes, Scot Williams and Ed Stoppard

=== Series 2 (2002) ===
No.	Title	Directed by	Written by	Original release date	Viewers (millions)
1	"Passion"	Gerry Poulson	Simon Sharkey	5 January 2002	6.70
A lonely call-centre supervisor (Quirke) is infatuated with her manager (Womack), who she believes is unappreciated and neglected by his wife. When she suspects a colleague (Davis) is having an affair with him, she plans to remove both obstacles from his life with the hope he will then realise a love for her. Starring Pauline Quirke, Lucy Davis and Mark Womack
2	"Disposal"	Frank W. Smith	J.C. Wilsher	27 January 2002	5.12
A mild-mannered waste disposal manager (Brydon) accidentally records evidence of his wife (Somerville) having an affair with his brother-in-law. He sets about planning revenge; the perfect murder - efficient and with no suspicion. But is it possible? (This episode features the main character(s) breaking the fourth wall and talking direct to the audience as the events unfold.) Starring Rob Brydon and Geraldine Somerville
3	"Rage"	David Innes Edwards	Anthony Horowitz	2 March 2002	5.87
A kitchen-knife salesman, Eddie (Dudgeon), is having an increasingly bad day. After a road-rage incident, Eddie believes he has killed a man. His overbearing mother (Crosbie) insists he does not contact the police to confess and sets about ensuring he is not detected. As pressure mounts and Eddie begins a friendship with the widow (O'Neill), an investigating detective begins getting closer to the identity of the murderer. Starring Annette Crosbie, Neil Dudgeon and Maggie O'Neill
4	"Swan Song"	Frank W. Smith	Anthony Horowitz	20 March 2002	4.81
A sexy nightclub singer (Robson) plots with her lover (Greco) to murder her rich husband (Webb) so she can inherit his money and develop her singing career. Starring Michael Greco, Samantha Robson, Danny Webb and Jesse Birdsall
5	"Flashback"	Ferdinand Fairfax	Stephen Leather	23 March 2002	5.32
A newly-appointed Judge (Havers) is shot on the steps of a courthouse. A series of flashbacks take us back to the events leading up to his last criminal court case as a QC: the violent murder of a high-class prostitute (Kensit). Starring Nigel Havers, Patsy Kensit, Jamie Foreman, Art Malik and David Hemmings
6	"Victim"	Audrey Cooke	Guy Burt	6 April 2002	4.73
Two friends move into the basement flat of a landlord (Stuke), who exhibits unusual behaviours. At the same time, a series of murders of local women are being reported in the local press. As one, Emily, gets closer to him, Lucy becomes increasingly suspicious of him. Starring Neil Stuke, Camilla Power and Frances Grey
7	"Memories"	Nick Jones	Stephen Leather	20 April 2002	5.91
A surgeon (Pearson) suffers recurring nightmares of being chased in woodland as a young boy. Can he unravel the mystery of his memories? Starring Neil Pearson, Rebecca Lacey and Anne Stallybrass
8	"Regrets"	Gerry Poulson	Simon Sharkey	28 May 2002	5.59
After a bank error results in a struggling business owner (Waterman) losing his business, house and marriage, he decides to get revenge. Starring Dennis Waterman and Samantha Beckinsale

=== Series 3 (2003) ===
No.	Title	Directed by	Written by	Original release date	Viewers (millions)
1	"Echoes"	Coky Giedroyc	Anthony Horowitz	25 January 2003	N/A
After a Victorian skeleton is found on her estate, a young woman (Fitzgerald) starts to experience strange happenings in the night. She calls for help from a psychic (Rhys) and they uncover parallels with the present. Starring Tara Fitzgerald, James Wilby and Paul Rhys
2	"Favours"	Frank W. Smith	J.C. Wilsher	2 February 2003	5.68
After making a new life, a pub landlord (Kemp) finds his past catching up with him in the form of old acquaintance Chaz (Davis), who needs one last favour... Starring Gary Kemp, Gaynor Faye and Phil Davis
3	"Stalkers"	Gerry Poulson	Gregory Evans	15 February 2003	4.40
Children's author Hat Vezey (Little) attempts to avoid an infatuated stalker (Morrissey), who becomes increasingly dangerous. Starring Neil Morrissey, Natasha Little and Barbara Flynn
4	"Suicide"	Sven Arnstein	Simon Sharkey	22 February 2003	6.40
A woman (Rigg) is found dead, apparently from suicide. However, as the police dig deeper, the suicide is not all that it appears. Starring Diana Rigg and John Bowe
5	"Contract"	Adrian Bean	Guy Burt	3 April 2003	5.65
Three city workers (Theakston, Raji James and Andrew Clover) hire a hitman (Faith) to prevent their fraudulent secret being revealed but after they believe that the 'mark' dies of natural causes, they decide that the deal is over. Starring Adam Faith and Jamie Theakston
6	"Landlord"	David Thacker	Simon Sharkey	11 May 2003	5.96
An unscrupulous landlord (Lyndhurst) rents a flat to a young student, who is overcome by fumes from a faulty boiler. He must then take desperate steps to cover his tracks. Starring Nicholas Lyndhurst and Ruth Gemmell
7	"Justice"	Alrick Riley	Eric Deacon	19 June 2003	5.01
After a confrontation with the son of a local criminal, a father (Dunbar) finds that events start to spiral out of control. He starts to suspect that Alex (Salmon), a Police officer and boyfriend of his ex-wife (Baxendale), is involved. Starring Helen Baxendale, Adrian Dunbar and Colin Salmon
8	"Cornershop"	Menhaj Huda	Stephen Leather	29 June 2003	4.85
A mild-mannered Indian shopkeeper (Patel) is being increasingly harassed and threatened by racist thugs. One night, in a surprising show of strength, he kills the chief troublemaker, but how is he to cover his tracks, especially under the scrutiny of his overbearing wife (Wadia), a very determined detective (Healy) on his case and his daughter's wedding coming up? Well, he does have one friend who might be able to help him.... Starring Bhasker Patel, Nina Wadia and Tim Healy
