= Colony (Grant novel) =

2000 novel written by Rob Grant

- First-edition cover
- Author: Rob Grant
- Language: English
- Genre: Comedy, Science fiction novel
- Publisher: Viking Press
- Publication date: 2 November 2000
- Publication place: United Kingdom
- Media type: Print (Hardback & Paperback)
- Pages: 288 (first edition, hardback)
- ISBN: 0-670-88965-2 (first edition, hardback)
- OCLC: 44183857

Colony was the first novel written by Rob Grant outside the Red Dwarf series. First published in 2000 by Viking Press in the United Kingdom, it stays within the science fiction comedy genre. The narrative is set on a spaceship sent on a voyage to colonise another planet, since Earth has been rendered uninhabitable. The mission is set to take numerous generations. Ten generations into the voyage, however, the crew's mental abilities have all been severely reduced, setting the events of the novel in motion.

== Plot summary ==
The story starts on Earth in the future. Global warming and overpopulation has caused an imminent apocalypse. The hope for the survival of the human race is a spaceship called the Willflower, which will take a small number of the world's best minds on a journey to colonize another planet. Eddie O'Hare, the protagonist, is not one of them. He is deep in debt due to his computer having mysteriously stolen several million dollars online, then sending it to an unknown location. He decides to gamble what money he has left in the hope of getting enough to pay back the debts. On his way to the casino, he meets a pink-socked assassin whom he fears may have been sent to kill him. Fortunately, it seems Eddie is not the man's current target.

When gambling the last of his money, Eddie wins—thanks to mimicking the gambling decisions of a man who looks uncannily like himself—but the casino closes down after losing all its money to the other man. Eddie discovers that this man, Charles Perry Gordon, is due to leave on the Willflower but does not want to go now that he was won such a vast fortune. Ramifications for the rest of his family mean Gordon cannot refuse to leave, so he offers Eddie his onboard credentials to go in his place. Eddie successfully smuggles himself onto the ship. As Gordon's job is the community planner, Eddie reads the plans to learn more about his job and discovers that the man he is replacing has enforced a fascist, totalitarian system: crew members are paired for life before they are even born, and jobs—even unpleasant ones such as prostitution—are inherited. However, shortly after the ship sets off he is murdered by an unknown assailant.

The story then jumps forward several generations. Eddie is revived as a cyborg with only his head and spinal column remaining of his original body, and trapped forever in a jar of green slime. (Even worse, the nerve endings are incorrectly wired, so that, for example, he moves his right arm when trying to move his left foot.) He finds himself on a ship full of idiots, and that something is wrong with the ship; All but one of its engines are gone, and it has only 20% of its manoeuvring thrusters. The ship needs to land soon, but only three planets are available: Thrrrppp, which is the most habitable but with no way for the ship to enter orbit; Penis, which the ship has a 50% chance of docking with but is covered in volcanoes; and Panties, which is totally hostile but has a 90% chance of docking. As the only intelligent life form on board, it is up to him to find out what is happening.

As he explores the ship, he meets more of the ship's mentally diminished crew, none of whom have even the slightest ability to perform their jobs. He is puzzled by this as well as the fact that the ship, which has been shown to be able to self-repair if it takes damage, has not done so. The ship is also on a collision course with a massive gas giant that does not appear on the radar system. Eddie decides to cause the nuclear-powered escape pod to self-destruct in the hope that the explosion will force the ship towards planet Thrrrppp. This fails when the less-than-moral priest steals the pod—accompanied by some of the ship's prostitutes to help him 'rebuild' human society—and destroys the remaining engines in the process.

Eddie encounters the assassin from the beginning of the novel, who was revived in another survival suit but driven completely insane by the process, and is now a homicidal maniac. Before he can harm Eddie, however, the ship kills him. It then talks to Eddie and reveals what has been happening. Its internal self-repair systems, it transpires, were also capable of self-modification, eventually becoming self-aware. Realizing the madness that the original community plans had instigated, it allowed the crew members to become illiterate to erase all memory of the old system. It has also gained the ability to time travel into the past, where it can affect electronics, but not take a physical form. The ship had selected Eddie to take charge of the crew as he was the only person with sufficiently low self-esteem to survive the cybernetic revival system; the sheer horror of the suit would have driven anyone else insane, but Eddie expected so little out of life that he actually came through the process as a better person. The ship caused Eddie's computer to steal the money (prompting the series of events that caused Eddie to arrive on the ship). The Willflower then repairs itself and flies to the planet Thrrrppp.

First-edition paperback cover

== Characters ==
Eddie O'Hare
An accountant posing as a community planner and, a few generations later, mistaken for a doctor and resurrected in an egg-like robot suit with nerve endings incorrectly connected (to the extent that the nerves controlling his new body's right hand should control a muscle in his anus). He believes himself to be the unluckiest man ever (and in the words of the novel: "bluntly, he's got a damn point"). Despite the contempt with which he is regarded, the rest of the crew come to subconsciously see him as a leader.
Paolo San Pablos
A hitman with a penchant for pink socks. A homicidal maniac, allegedly known to resort to spree murder as an anti-boredom device, he stowed away on the Willflower to kill Eddie as part of a contract, but was caught and put in suspended animation before he was revived. The revival procedure caused him to go insane, brutally disembowelling several people before the ship neutralises him.
Bernadette Oslo
A member of the Willflower's crew; although her precise role on the ship is unclear, her nagging familiarity to Eddie, coupled with his asexual fondness for her, suggests that she may be his own descendant.
Father Lewis
The ship's priest, although, by his own admission, his career is difficult due to his atheism (jobs are inherited, preventing him from changing roles). A fan of pornography, he possesses several video tapes of the women's shower room. He has installed a network of cameras throughout the ship, partly to gain more pornographic material but also to spy on people. He is not above blackmailing people with these images. Towards the end of the novel, he escapes the Willflower in the one remaining functional escape pod, taking the ship's prostitutes with him.
Styx
Clones of the original security chief. Incredibly stupid, mainly due to the mental deterioration involved in every new batch of drones (they are described in the blurb as "having the mental agility of pond life"), most people simply treat the drones as equipment, with Eddie being the sole exception. Each Styx drone has a letter branded on his forehead and a name beginning with this letter to distinguish between them. The Styx drones are dangerously enthusiastic about their jobs, with one drone even accidentally killing himself by firing his laser rifle at a door on the maximum power setting at point blank range.
Trinity Peck
The Willflower's science officer, who unfortunately, is in fact a religious fanatic who reacts to danger by beating herself with a whip while naked to punish herself for not noticing the problem earlier. She regards Eddie as an agent of the Devil.
Captain Gwent
A spotty teenager who names planets after bodily functions and parts (specifically, "Thrrrppp", "Penis", "Panties" and "Jockstrap") and appears totally unconcerned about the fact that he is meant to be in charge of the mission (his father died under unspecified circumstances shortly before Eddie's revival). He is totally incompetent as a leader, but nobody seems to try to remove him from power, mainly because jobs are inherited and nobody knows who is meant to take the captain's place in this situation.
Captain Berwick Gwent
The original captain of the mission. Refers to himself as "Community Director", speaks ridiculously loudly and makes "jokes" in Latin. In terms of age, he is described as either "a well-preserved sixty or a gone-to-seed forty with inadequate access to hair dye".
Amalgam Willard-Walters aka The Professors
Two bitter rivals whose minds have been merged into one body. They have been put in cryogenic storage, as they have been constantly arguing and attempting to commit suicide.

== Reception ==
By March 2002 it had sold more than 22,500 copies.
