= Fat (novel) =

Book by Rob Grant

- First edition (publ. Gollancz)
- Author: Rob Grant
- Genre: Comedy
- Publisher: Gollancz
- ISBN: 978-0-575-07420-0

Fat (2006) is a comedy novel by Red Dwarf co-creator Rob Grant, satirising attitudes towards dieting and obesity. During the course of the book, various other themes are also satirised, including health and safety regulations, manufactured pop (including a parody of Girls Aloud, called Gurlz Banned) and lawyers. The book follows the lives of three somewhat unusual individuals over a period spanning a few days, in which their stories eventually interact to varying extents.

== Characters ==
Grenville Roberts: A divorced TV chef who is so fat that he is no longer "off the peg". Tends to slip into a rage should anybody mention his weight. He destroys another person's car and much of a health club during one such episode. Throughout the story he makes many bitter remarks at the law system and how society mistreats overweight people. After being fired from his job as a TV Chef (His famous book had ten pages dedicated to boiling eggs), his agent told him about the idea of the Government Well Farms to get him back on his feet. After the VIP opening, which he spots one of the other characters, Jeremy Slank, he arrives along with other obese small-time celebrities and is appalled at the state. Eventually the conditions and incompetence drive him to an insane rage and he demolishes the camp by breaking chairs, windows, and using a mower to carve out a swear word to the Prime Minister. In the end, he is given his own TV show where he goes to restaurants, and uses his rage to take them down a peg or two.

Hayleigh Griffin: A teenage girl who is starving herself by avoiding food where possible and discarding or regurgitating if not, indicating she probably has anorexia. She worships a pop idol called Jase which could be the cause as she constantly wants to impress him. During the story she goes to extreme lengths including faking her period and pretending to eat breakfast. The situation becomes so bad she has to go to hospital and have psychiatry treatments. At the same time, Jeremy Slank, the third character in the story, is investigating the NHS hospitals and sees her. He arranges a meeting with the pop idol and he comes to her drugged up and smelling. Eventually the entire ordeal seems to cure her anorexia and she becomes quite happy, taking on Jeremy as her new icon. Initially, the reader will believe her to be fat, but it later transpires that she is unhealthily thin.

Jeremy Slank: A "Conceptuologist" (euphemism for PR man, parodying complicated job titles that have arisen in recent years) who is involved in the Well Farms project in the story to help fight weight problems. He is the only character to meet/interact with the other two. He is described as average and normal as he is trying to impress the Prime Minister. After a monologue of how he thinks it will go, he instead is given two minutes by a bulky security guard and is put on a helicopter to the Well Farms. On the helicopter he meets a student called Jemma who he then starts to flirt with and she tells him what she thinks of the project. After the tour and Jeremy doing his job, she invites him for dinner and almost starts to perform oral sex before realising it's not her boyfriend and leaves. As he checks his e-mail frustrated, he finds an e-mail from the Prime Minister saying on how he did a great job. He is next seen at the Press conference opening the Well Farms to which the Prime Minister actually remembers and greets him. He is then put on his right hand side as the Prime Minister introduces the project. Because the Well Farms are such a 'success', 'P' (As he lets Jeremy call him that now) asks Jeremy to handle the rebranding of the NHS. Jeremy then takes a tour, but goes on his own, and discovers Hayleigh revealing she is very anorexic. In the end, he is unaffected by the monumental 'failure' of the Well Farms and meets Jemma who has moved and broken up with her boyfriend. He kisses her and his story in the book ends.
