= The 10%ers =

British ITV sitcom 1994–96

- Also known as: The 10 Percenters
- Genre: Comedy
- Written by: Doug Naylor; Paul Alexander; Rob Grant
- Directed by: Ed Bye; Marcus Mortimer
- Starring: Clive Francis; Benedict Taylor; Colin Stinton; Elizabeth Bennett
- Country of origin: United Kingdom
- Original language: English
- No. of series: 2
- No. of episodes: 15

Production
- Running time: 30 minutes
- Production companies: Grant Naylor Productions; Carlton Television

Original release
- Network: ITV
- Release: 23 February 1993 – 3 September 1996

The 10%ers is a British television comedy series, broadcast on ITV.

Set in the office of a theatrical agent, it began as a pilot in 1993 shown as part of ITV's short-lived Comedy Playhouse (not to be confused with the BBC's long-running Comedy Playhouse), then ran for two series, shown in 1994 and 1996. The regular cast were: Clive Francis, who played the main character Dominic Eden, Benedict Taylor as Atin, Colin Stinton as Tony, and Elizabeth Bennett as Joan. There were cameo appearances from Jonathan Ross and Nicholas Parsons.

The pilot was written by Rob Grant and Doug Naylor, though the first and second series were written by Naylor and various co-writers, including Steve Punt and Paul Alexander. The producer was Ed Bye, then Marcus Mortimer.

== Transmissions ==
- Pilot: Comedy Playhouse - 23 February 1993
- Series 1: Monday 18 April – 6 June 1994 - 7 episodes
- Series 2: Tuesday 9 July – 3 September 1996 - 7 episodes.
