= Dark Ages (TV series) =

1999 British television sitcom

- Genre: Sitcom
- Created by: Merle Nygate
- Written by: Rob Grant
- Directed by: Steve Bendelack
- Starring: Phill Jupitus; Alistair McGowan; Pauline McLynn
- Country of origin: United Kingdom
- Original language: English
- No. of series: 1
- No. of episodes: 5 (list of episodes)

Production
- Executive producer: Andy Harries
- Producer: Justin Judd
- Running time: 30 min.
- Production company: Granada Television

Original release
- Network: ITV
- Release: 20 December – 27 December 1999

Dark Ages is a British television sitcom, first broadcast as five thirty-minute episodes on ITV in December 1999. It portrayed medieval English villagers fearful of the turn of the new (second) millennium in the year 999 AD, and parodied contemporary fears at the turn of the third millennium (such as the Millennium Bug) in 1999. It was written by Rob Grant and directed by Steve Bendelack.

== Production ==
Dark Ages was created by Merle Nygate in 1996 and commissioned by Granada Television for development. Producer Justin Judd and Nygate could not make the concept work for an ITV audience, so Nygate was replaced by Rob Grant, better known for writing Red Dwarf for BBC Two. Grant's new scripts for Dark Ages were described by Judd as being more suited for a BBC Two audience, and Grant was required to alter them accordingly. Though a lot of scenes featuring computer-generated effects were required, Dark Ages still had a regular sitcom budget of no more than £200,000. Location filming of the village was done for a week at West Stow Anglo-Saxon village in Suffolk. Production then moved into a studio for five weeks between April and May 1999 to film scenes in front of a live audience.

The costume designer was inspired by the works of Bruegel and from research visits to the Jorvik Viking Centre. She created some costumes from scratch, using vegetable dyes from the era depicted, and re-used some from other productions. In post-production, the video was "filmized" to improve the production standards.

== Episodes ==
1. Vile Vole Pie
2. Vikings
3. War
4. Witch
5. The End of the World

== Cast ==
- Phill Jupitus - Gudrun, an "Essex man of 1,000 years ago".
- Alistair McGowan - Redwald
- Pauline McLynn - Agnes
- Dave Lamb - Badsmith
- Paul Putner - Bigwart
- Mike Hayley - Byrnoth
- Sheridan Smith - Matilda
- Laurence Howarth - Cedric
- Jason Byrne - Arland

=== Guests ===
- Richard Ashton - Viking
- Tony Gardner - Starbuck
- Miriam Karlin - Hag
