= Colin Stinton =

Canadian-American actor (born 1947)

- Born: March 10, 1947 (age 79); Calgary, Alberta, Canada
- Education: Northern Illinois University
- Occupation: Actor

Colin Stinton (born March 10, 1947) is a Canadian and American actor. He is widely known for his collaborations with playwright and filmmaker David Mamet, and has worked extensively in the United Kingdom since 1985. He is a Joseph Jefferson Award winner and a Drama Desk Award nominee.

== Early life and education ==
Born in Calgary, Alberta, Canada in 1947, Stinton moved to the United States as a child in 1952. He lived in a trailer with his family—traveling throughout the U.S. and finally settling in the Chicago area. There he attended Northern Illinois University, acting in several campus productions and writing a musical based on the biblical story of David and Absalom with co-authors Andy Waterman and Larry Woodruff. He acted in touring company throughout southeastern United States in 1973. Later he joining an alumni group that performed in Chicago as the Dinglefest Theatre Company, which later established The Theatre Building. He spent several years as part of the Chicago theatre scene where he met and worked frequently with playwright-director David Mamet.

== Career ==
Stinton lived in New York, 1978–1985, during which he created the title role in Mamet's Edmond, and received a Theatre World Award for his role in Mamet's The Water Engine, on Broadway. He moved to London in 1985, where he spent several years at the National Theatre in addition to work in the West End and in film, television and radio. He returned to New York to earn a Drama Desk Award nomination for his role in the U.S. premier of Richard Nelson's Some Americans Abroad, and played Mr. Robinson in both the London and New York stage versions of The Graduate.

He was in the original stage production of Rain Man in London and a West End revival of The Pajama Game in 2014. His stage work includes premieres of new plays by David Mamet, Jean-Claude van Itallie, Richard Nelson, Dusty Hughes, David Hare, John Osborne, and Tom Stoppard.

He played Neal Daniels in The Bourne Ultimatum. Other roles include President Arthur Coleman Winters in the Doctor Who episode "The Sound of Drums", US Secretary of State Al Haig in The Falklands Play, the US Ambassador to the United Kingdom in The Trial of Tony Blair, the United States Secretary of State Traynor Styles in Spooks, and Justice Robert H. Jackson in the BBC docudrama Nuremberg: Nazis on Trial.

He appeared as Dr. Dave Greenwalt in the James Bond film Tomorrow Never Dies and the disbelieving Detective Cartert in the Arielle Kebbel horror vehicle Freakdog. He played opinionated news caster Anthony Markowitz in Broken News.

Stinton played the part of an American named Charles Lester in one of Agatha Christie's Poirot serials Poirot's Early Cases entitled "The Lost Mine". He also appears as the head judge in the 2001 music video, "Murder on the Dancefloor", by Sophie Ellis-Bextor.

He appeared as Lt Colonel Hoyt Jackson for the US Justice Department, tracking a Nazi war criminal in Foyle's War Series 8, Episode 3, "Sunflower" in 2013.

== Personal life ==
Stinton now lives in Walthamstow, Greater London; and in Chicago.

== Filmography ==
=== Film ===
Year	Title	Role	Notes
1982	The Verdict	Billy	
1983	Daniel	Dale	
1990	The Russia House	Henziger	
1991	Homicide	Walter B Wells	
1992	Flodders in America	Jack	
1996	In Love and War	Tom Burnside	
1997	Tomorrow Never Dies	Dr. Dave Greenwalt	
1999	The Winslow Boy	Desmond Curry	
2001	Spy Game	Henry Pollard	
2002	Ali G Indahouse	US Delegate	
2002	Thunderpants	Foster	
2002	The Hours	Hotel Clerk	
2003	Quicksand	Harbinson	
2003	Belly of the Beast	Jim Cox	
2004	The Machinist	Inspector Rogers	
2004	Closer	Customs Officer	
2005	The Jacket	Jury Foreman	
2005	Proof	Theoretical Physicist	
2006	Second in Command	Ambassador George Norland	
2006	The Kovak Box	Encargado Consulado	
2006	Big Nothing	Max	
2007	The Bourne Ultimatum	Neal Daniels	
2008	TransSiberian	Embassy Official	
2008	Freakdog	Detective Cartert	
2011	Captain America: The First Avenger	New York Taxi Driver	Uncredited
2012	City Slacker	Freddie	
2013	Trimming Pablo		Short film
2013	Rush	Teddy Mayer	
2017	Borg vs McEnroe	Talk Show Host	
2017	The Current War	Daniel Burnham	
2018	Beirut	Mr. Jones	
2018	Hunter Killer	Senator from Iowa	
2018	Show Dogs	NYPD Chief	
2019	Adults in the Room	Steve	
2020	Blithe Spirit	Cecil B. DeMille	
2020	Wonder Woman 1984	NORAD Colonel	
2022	All the Old Knives	Moscow Station Chief	

=== Television ===
Year	Title	Role	Notes
1980	The American Short Story	Hotel Manager	Episode: "Paul's Case"
1987	Yesterday's Dreams	Ed Gutman	Recurring role; 2 episodes
1987	Still Crazy Like a Fox	Thurmond Richards	Television film
1988	A Very Peculiar Practice	Charlie Dusenberry	Recurring role; 6 episodes
1988	Lip Service	Salesman #2	Television film
1989	Saracen	Lou Grady	Episode: "Infidels"
1989	Coded Hostile	Operator	Television film
1989	Mother Love	Concert Hall Manager	Episode: "Episode 2"
1989	The Ginger Tree	Bob Dale	Episode: "Episode 3"
1990	Agatha Christie's Poirot	Charles Lester	Episode: "The Lost Mine"
1990	The Tragedy of Flight 103: The Inside Story	Raymond Smith	Television film
1992	A Bit of Fry & Laurie	Judge	Episode: "Series 3, Episode 6"
1992	Hostages	Mike Mulholland	Television film
1992	Ghostwatch	Dr. Emilio Sylvestri	Television film
1993	Comedy Playhouse	Tony	Episode: "The 10%ers"
1993	A Year in Provence	Bishop Brian Stanford	Miniseries; 2 episodes
1993	Remember	Art Morgan	Television film
1994	99-1	Hanson	Episode: "Trust Me"
1994	The 10%ers	Tony	Series regular; 7 episodes
1995	The Infiltrator	Aaron Breitbart	Television film
1997	Jonathan Creek	Scott Reisner	Episode: "Jack in the Box"
1997	Strange but True?	Reconstruction Cast	Episode: "Remote Viewing (David Morehouse)"
2000	Dark Realm	Atwater	Episode: "Skin Deep"
2001	The Armando Iannucci Shows		Recurring role; 2 episodes
2002	The American Embassy	John Macavoy	Episode: "China Cup"
2002	Waking the Dead	Larry Karp	Episode: "Special Relationship"
2002	The Falklands Play	Alexander Haig	Television film
2003	Manchild	Plastic Surgeon	Episode: "Series 2, Episode 1"
2003	Down to Earth	Mr. Simpich	Episode: "The Poseidon Effect"
2003	Spine Chillers	Gangster	Episode: "Fairy Godfather"
2003	Seven Wonders of the Industrial World	Walker 'Brig' Young	Episode: "The Hoover Dam"
2003	Days That Shook the World	Voiceover	Episode: "The Assassination of JFK/The Resignation of Nixon"
2004	12 Days of Terror	Dr. John Nichols	Television film
2004	Space Odyssey: Voyage to the Planets	Fred Duncan	Television film
2005	Broken News	Anthony Markowitz	Series regular; 6 episodes
2006	My Family	Dr. Buck Bukowski	Episode: "Bliss for Idiots"
2006	Spooks	Traynor Styles	Episode: "World Trade"
2006	A for Andromeda	Kaufman	Television film
2006	Nuremberg: Nazis on Trial	Justice Robert Jackson	Miniseries; 3 episodes
2006	The Wild West	Lew Wallace	Episode: "Billy the Kid"
2006	Wire in the Blood	Professor Sutton	Episode: "Hole in the Heart"
2007	Doctor Who	President Arthur Coleman Winters	Episode: "The Sound of Drums"
2007	Consenting Adults	Alfred Kinsey	Television film
2007	The Trial of Tony Blair	US Ambassador	Television film
2008	House of Saddam	US Journalist	Miniseries; 1 episode
2008	Harley Street	Mr. Stanson	Episode: "Episode 4"
2008	Wire in the Blood	Radio Announcer	Episode: "Prayer of the Bone"
2009	Moonshot	Robert R. Gilruth	Television film
2012	Trigger Point	Morgan	Recurring role
2012	Chasing Leprechauns	Thorpe	Television film
2013	Foyle's War	Lieutenant Colonel Hoyt Jackson	Episode: "Sunflower"
2014	Veep	US Ambassador	Episode: "Special Relationship"
2017	Fearless	Jack Kretchmer	Miniseries; 5 episodes
2017	Outlander	Dean Jackson	Episode: "The Battle Joined"
2018	Butterfly	Dr. Leonard Farrow	Miniseries; 2 episodes
2019	Absentia	Dr. Steven Mandel	Recurring role; 2 episodes
2019	The Crown	Lawrence Spivak	Episode: "Bubbikins"
2020	Hanna	Tom Kaladski	Episode: "The Trial"
2020	The Queen's Gambit	Chennault	Episode: "Adjournment"
2021	The Serpent	Bastien	Episode: "Episode Six"
2024	Silent Witness	Ted Holmes (voice)	Episode: "Kings Cross - Part 1"

=== Video games ===
Year	Title	Voice role	Notes
2010	Apache: Air Assault		
2011	Battlefield 3	Overwatch	
2011	Anno 2070	Trenchcoat	
2015	Blues and Bullets	Jim Dockers	
2015	Anno 2205	Emem Buhari	English version
2015	Randal's Monday	Bruno / Narrator / Rod	
2016	Deponia Doomsday	Junk Wizard / Zoon	English version
2021	Encased	Dean Rayhet	
2023	RoboCop: Rogue City		
2024	Wizardry Variants Daphne		English version

=== Music videos ===
Year	Title	Artist	Role	Notes
2001	"Murder on the Dancefloor"	Sophie Ellis-Bextor	Judge	
2024	"Freedom of the Night"	Sophie Ellis-Bextor	Judge	Uncredited

=== Audio/podcast ===
Year	Title	Role	Notes
2024	Purple Heart Warriors	Col. Pence	BBC Radio drama
