= Denis Lill =

Actor

- Born: 22 April 1942 (age 84); Hamilton, New Zealand
- Occupation: Actor
- Years active: 1972–present
- Children: 5

Denis Lill (born 22 April 1942) is a New Zealand-born British actor. He is best known for his roles in Survivors as Charles Vaughan, Rumpole of the Bailey as Mr. Bernard, Only Fools and Horses as Alan Parry, Outside Edge as Dennis Broadley and the ITV medical drama The Royal as Consultant General Surgeon Mr Rose.

== Career ==
Lill joined the RNZAF as a 13–course BES cadet entrant in 1959. It was in the RNZAF that he first expressed an interest in amateur dramatics and a fondness for mimicking characters of the BBC's The Goon Show. Throughout his air force career, he involved himself in operatic and theatric productions. He left New Zealand for Britain in 1967.

Some of his many film and television roles include ‘The Regiment’ (1972-3), Fall of Eagles (1974), Special Branch (1974 series 4, ep12), Edward the Seventh (1975), Survivors (1975–77), The Eagle Has Landed (1976), Bad Blood (1981), The Scarlet Pimpernel (1982), as William Knox D'Arcy, the Australian oil pioneer in Persia, in Reilly: Ace of Spies (1983), Rumpole of the Bailey (1983–92), Mapp and Lucia (1985–86), Only Fools and Horses (1989–92), Batman (1989), Bernard and the Genie (1991), Red Dwarf (Gunmen of the Apocalypse, 1993), Richard III (1995), Evita (1996), The Opium War (1997), Rebecca (1997) Heartbeat (2002) and The Royal (2003-2011).

Lill twice appeared in the BBC's science fiction series Doctor Who: as Dr Fendelman in the 1977 serial Image of the Fendahl and as Sir George Hutchinson in 1984's The Awakening. After a one-off appearance in the first series of Terry Nation's post-apocalyptic drama Survivors as Charles Vaughan, he became the leading actor for the show's second and third series. Lill portrayed Bertie, the Prince of Wales and later Edward the VII, in the 1978 period serial drama Lillie opposite Francesca Annis as Lillie Langtry. In 1980 he appeared in the role of Josef Merhart, a member of an organised crime syndicate involved in a silver bullion robbery in the hard-hitting British police drama The Professionals; the episode titled "Hijack".

In the 1990s he appeared in sitcoms Outside Edge as Dennis Broadley and Only Fools and Horses as Cassandra's father, Alan Parry.

Lill appeared in the 1986 Sherlock Holmes adaptation of The Man with the Twisted Lip as Inspector Bradstreet, a character he played in two further Holmes adventures in 1988 & 1994. He also appeared as the drunken MP Sir Talbot Buxomly who died onscreen in an episode of Blackadder the Third and as the Beadle in Blackadder's Christmas Carol. He also appeared as Sir Reuben Astwell in "The Underdog" (1993) of the detective series Poirot. He appeared in Red Dwarf, playing a rogue simulant in "Gunmen of the Apocalypse", in Bertie and Elizabeth as Clement Attlee (2002) and from 2003 until 2011 Lill starred in the ITV1 drama The Royal as Consultant General Surgeon Mr. Rose. Lill has also worked in radio theatre with one of his memorable characters being the brother in Ron Blair's play The Christian Brothers. In 2014, he appeared in 24: Live Another Day.

In February 2016, Lill appeared in series 18 episode 4 " A Dying Art" of the ITV crime drama Midsomer Murders.

Lill appeared in Series 2 Episode 5 of "Shakespeare and Hathaway: Private Investigators" in March 2019.

== Personal life ==
Lill resides in Ryme Intrinseca, Dorset, with his wife Vanessa. They have two children.

== Selected filmography ==
1974	Who Killed Lamb?	Sgt. Beck	TV film
1974	Fall of Eagles	Frederick III	TV series
1975	Madame Bovary	Rodolphe Boulanger	TV series
1975−1977	Survivors	Charles Vaughan	24 episodes
1976	The Eagle Has Landed	Churchill's aide	
1977	Full Circle	Doctor	
1980	The Professionals	Josef Merhart	TV Series
1981	Bad Blood	Ted Best	
1982	The Scarlet Pimpernel	Count de Tournay	
1983−1992	Rumpole of the Bailey	Mr. Bernard	14 episodes
1985	The Innocent	Doctor	
1985−1986	Mapp & Lucia	Major Benjy Flint	10 episodes
1986−1994	Sherlock Holmes	Inspector Bradstreet	3 episodes
1988	Salome's Last Dance	Tigellenus / Chilvers	
1989	Batman	Bob the Cartoonist	
1989−1992	Only Fools And Horses	Alan Parry	8 episodes
1993	Red Hot	The Rector	
1993	Agatha Christie’s Poirot	Sir Reuben Astwell	TV series
1994-1996	Outside Edge	Dennis Broadley	21 episodes
1995	Richard III	Lord Mayor	
1996	Evita	President Farrell	
1996	Element of Doubt	Simon	
1997	Fierce Creatures	Woman's Husband	
1997	Mrs Dalloway	Doctor Holmes	
1998	What Rats Won't Do	Moot Master	
2002	Heartbeat	Mr Morris	S11E12
2003−2011	The Royal	Mr. Rose	87 episodes
2022	The Salt Path	Dog Walker	
