= Heil Honey I'm Home! =

1990 British television series

- Genre: Sitcom
- Written by: Geoff Atkinson
- Directed by: Juliet May
- Starring: Neil McCaul; DeNica Fairman; Maria Friedman; Gareth Marks; Caspar Constantine; Lewis Barratt; Thomas Lord; Ben Boardman; Laura Brattan
- Country of origin: United Kingdom
- Original language: English
- No. of series: 1
- No. of episodes: 8 (7 unaired)

Production
- Executive producer: Paul Jackson
- Producer: Harry Waterson
- Production companies: British Satellite Broadcasting; Noel Gay Television

Original release
- Network: Galaxy
- Release: 30 September 1990

Heil Honey I'm Home! is a British sitcom, written by Geoff Atkinson and produced in 1990, which was cancelled after one episode. It centres on Adolf Hitler and Eva Braun, who live next door to a Jewish couple, Arny and Rosa Goldenstein. The show spoofs elements of mid-20th century American sitcoms and is driven by Hitler's inability to get along with his neighbours. It caused controversy when broadcast, but Atkinson said that the show was intended to be satirical.

== Premise and plot ==
The first episode opens with a caption card explaining Heil Honey's fictional back-story, which supposes the rediscovered "lost tapes" of an abandoned, never-aired American sitcom created by "Brandon Thalburg Jnr" (a reference to both Irving Thalberg and Brandon Tartikoff). Ironically, the real show would suffer a similar fate, as only one episode ever aired of its recorded eight episodes.

In 1938, Adolf Hitler and Eva Braun live in Berlin, next door to a Jewish couple, Arny and Rosa Goldenstein. Hitler and Braun have little in common with their historical counterparts, acting more like a stock sitcom husband and wife. Hitler, for example, appears in a golfing sweater and cravat as well as military garb. The Goldensteins are similarly hackneyed characters, with Arny making frequent disparaging comments about his mother-in-law and mockingly performing a Nazi salute at one point. The show is a spoof—not of the Third Reich, but of the sort of sitcoms produced in the United States between the 1950s and 1970s "that would embrace any idea, no matter how stupid". In this spirit the title, plot and dialogue are deliberately vapid and corny and characters are applauded whenever they arrive on set. Patterned after I Love Lucy, the actors have New York accents.

The plot of the first episode centres on the British Prime Minister, Neville Chamberlain, coming to the Hitler house. Not wanting the Goldensteins to interrupt the visit, Hitler instructs Braun to keep the news from Rosa, which she fails to do. Rosa duly invites herself over with hopes of matching Chamberlain with her dull niece Ruth. Hitler gets the Goldensteins drunk in an attempt to make them leave before Chamberlain arrives, but they stay. Arny and Eva end up leading the visiting Prime Minister in a conga line around the living room while Hitler hides the "peace for our time" agreement in the icebox.

== Cast ==
- Neil McCaul as Adolf Hitler
- DeNica Fairman as Eva Braun (replaced by Maria Friedman in unaired episodes)
- Gareth Marks as Arny Goldenstein
- Lewis Barratt as Joseph Stalin (character only appeared in unaired episodes)
- Caspar Constantine as Background Narrator (exclusive to episode 4) and Kapitänleutnant Günther Stark in the series finale
- Caroline Gruber as Rosa Goldenstein
- Laura Brattan as Ruth
- Thomas Lord as Hermann Göring (only in unaired 1990 Christmas special)
- Ben Boardman as Reinhard Heydrich (character removed from show after episode 6)
- Patrick Cargill as Neville Chamberlain

== Production, controversy and cancellation ==
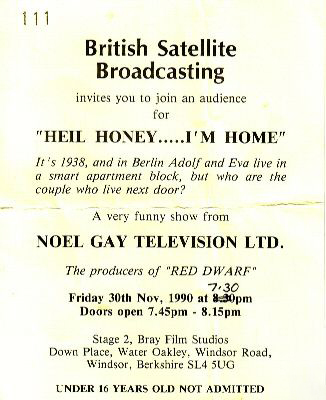
Ticket to a planned recording of an episode

The programme was written by Geoff Atkinson and commissioned by the satellite television channel Galaxy, part of British Satellite Broadcasting (which later became part of BSkyB). It was shown at 9.30pm on a Sunday, after an episode of Dad's Army. During the credits of Dad's Army, Galaxy's announcer said "And unless Arthur Lowe defeats him, it's the man himself in a few moments in Heil Honey, I'm Home!, as the Galaxy Comedy Weekend continues." Only the pilot was ever screened, although 11 episodes were planned and eight were recorded in which a story arc involved Hitler's secretive attempts to kill the Goldensteins. Unlike the pilot episode, the other episodes had animated opening titles, similar in nature to those of Bewitched.

The programme proved controversial, with Hayim Pinner, secretary general of the Board of Deputies of British Jews describing the pilot as "in very bad taste," adding that the Board was opposed to "any trivialisation of the Second World War, Hitler or the Holocaust". Television historian Marian Calabro described it as "perhaps the world's most tasteless situation comedy". The taping of the series was cancelled immediately by Sky (BSkyB) on its acquisition of British Satellite Broadcasting, and the show was listed at number 61 on Channel 4's 100 Greatest TV Moments from Hell. However, some commentators also point out the crassness was intentional, and an element of the parody – among these is David Hawkes, professor of English, who cites Heil Honey, I'm Home! as a "heavy-handed concept", and argues that the show was a failure as a comedy because it "disastrously exceeded" the limits of irony. Atkinson maintains that the aim of the show was not to shock but to examine the appeasement surrounding Hitler in 1938. He said that the satire of this appeasement did not translate as well as he intended. Discussing the furore around the show, Atkinson has also stated that three quarters of the cast were Jewish and did not consider the concept controversial. Even so, the show has reached a level of infamy in which it still gets discussed in incredulous terms on retrospective programmes.

A video from GarethMarks.com, entitled "Comedy Showreel", contains clips from the pilot and unseen episodes. Arthur Mathews has said that the production company sent him a copy of the entire series.

== See also ==
- List of television series canceled after one episode
- Adolf Hitler in popular culture
- 1990 in British television
- List of television shows notable for negative reception
- That's My Bush!, another show parodying American sitcoms using politics
- Downfall parodies, internet videos that utilise footage from the 2004 historical drama Downfall
