= Jake Abraham =

English actor (1967–2023)

- Born: 1967; Toxteth, Liverpool, England
- Died: 1 October 2023 (aged 56)
- Occupation: Actor
- Years active: 1986–2023

Jake Abraham (1967 – 1 October 2023) was an English actor. He was best known for his role in Lock, Stock and Two Smoking Barrels, a 1998 film by Guy Ritchie. His other film appearances included Mean Machine (2001), and Formula 51 (2001), also known as The 51st State. He also appeared in many television programmes, including GBH (Channel 4) and Help! (BBC 1).

== Life and career ==
Born in Toxteth, Liverpool, Abraham began acting on stage at the age of 12 at Everyman Youth Theatre.

Abraham died from prostate cancer on 1 October 2023, at the age of 56.

== Reviews ==
A 1986 review in the Liverpool Echo about the BBC television series Help! said, "Jake Abraham threatens to steal the show as the dimwitted Davva".

== Filmography ==
- 1986 – Help! – Davva
- 1987 – It's Wicked! – Co-presenter
- 1990 – Making Out – Jed
- 1990 – Screenplay – Greg
- 1991 – The Brittas Empire – Danny
- 1991 – G.B.H. – Black Waiter
- 1991 – Blonde Fist – Eric Cane
- 1992 – Red Dwarf – Second Lister
- 1994 – Blood on the Dole – Paul Price
- 1995 – Sharpe – Donkin
- 1995 – Sardines – Mickey
- 1995 – Backup – Olly
- 1995 – The Governor – Brian Samora
- 1998 – Lock, Stock and Two Smoking Barrels – Dean
- 1998 – Trial and Retribution – Taxi Driver
- 1998 – Liverpool 1 – Tony
- 2001 – The Parole Officer – Seedy Bloke
- 2001 – The 51st State – Konokko
- 2001 – Mean Machine – Bob Carter
- 2002 – The Bill – John Wilkin and Carl Stockton
- 2002 – Revengers Tragedy – 2nd Man in Bar
- 2003 – Merseybeat – Franny Williams
- 2003 – Oh Marbella! – OPC1
- 2003 – The Commander – Tony Farmer
- 2003 – American Cousins – Vince
- 2003 – The Virgin of Liverpool – Bill
- 2009 – Holby City – Andy Dunkley and Rory Stillman
- 2010 – London Boulevard – Paparazzo Two
- 2011 – Justice – Jake Little
- 2012 – Spike Island – Security Dave
- 2013 – Prisoners Wives – Figgy
- 2013 – Tamla Rose – Jim
- 2017 – Ghetto Heaven – Mick Lewis
- 2018 – Shooting Fish – Lenny
- 2021 – Moving On – Don and Levi
- 2022 – The Responder – Car Park Attendant
- 2023 – Our Kid – Karl
