= Grant Naylor =

British production company

Grant Naylor Productions
- Company type: Television production company
- Founded: 1990
- Founders: Rob Grant; Doug Naylor
- Headquarters: London, United Kingdom
- Key people: Rob Grant, Doug Naylor
- Products: Red Dwarf; The 10%ers
- Website: grantnaylor.co.uk

Grant Naylor was a writing partnership between Rob Grant and Doug Naylor, and the name of the pair's company, Grant Naylor Productions. As a pseudonym, it was used for their collaborative work, including the novelisation of the television series Red Dwarf. Grant and Naylor themselves called this pseudonym a "gestalt entity" (i.e., something that is greater than the sum of its parts).

== History ==
The collaboration began in the mid-1980s, when the duo co-wrote BBC Radio 4 programmes such as Cliché and its sequel, Son of Cliché, and television programmes such as the British satire Spitting Image, the office-based comedy The 10%ers, and various projects for Jasper Carrott. The pair are also credited with writing the lyrics to "The Chicken Song" and a number of other musical parodies for Spitting Image.

The "Grant Naylor collaboration", as it had become known, created the cult science fiction comedy series Red Dwarf. The first three series were produced by Paul Jackson's company, and Grant Naylor Productions was set up in 1990 as the production company of the show, being a joint venture between Naylor, Grant, and Noel Gay Television (who had acquired Paul Jackson Productions).

In the mid-1990s, after the sixth series of Red Dwarf, Grant left the show, ending the collaboration with Naylor, but Grant Naylor Productions continued. Later series of Red Dwarf were written by Naylor, sometimes in collaboration with other writers, particularly on series 7.

After the end of the eighth series in 1999, Grant Naylor Productions (under Doug Naylor) attempted to make a feature-length adaptation of the show but was unable to find sufficient funding. Instead, a new three-part television miniseries, Red Dwarf: Back to Earth, was created and shown on channel Dave, over the Easter weekend in April 2009. Since then, Grant Naylor Productions has created Red Dwarf X, broadcast in 2012; Red Dwarf XI, broadcast on Dave in 2016; Red Dwarf XII, which was shot back-to-back with XI and broadcast in 2017; and a 2020 telemovie.

In March 2020, Naylor ceased to be a director of the company due to a legal dispute with the company and Grant over Red Dwarf rights. On 10 March 2023, Grant and Naylor announced on Twitter that the dispute had been resolved. Grant died in February 2026.
