= Andy De Emmony =

British television and film director

- Occupation(s): Film and television director
- Years active: 1992–present

Andy De Emmony (born c. 1964; sometimes spelled DeEmmony) is a British television and film director.

== Career ==
De Emmony has worked primarily in comedy, including Red Dwarf VI, Father Ted, Spitting Image. He has directed two features: the comedy sequel West is West and the comedy horror Love Bite.

He has won one BAFTA (British Academy Television Award for Best Comedy (Programme or Series), Father Ted, 1999) and has picked up nominations for his work on Spitting Image, Cutting It, The Canterbury Tales and Kenneth Williams: Fantabulosa!.
