= Juliet May =

British television director

- Born: United Kingdom
- Occupation: Television director
- Years active: Red Dwarf; Microsoap; The Lenny Henry Show
- Parent(s): Val May, Penelope May

Juliet May is a British television director. She has directed television shows such as Dalziel and Pascoe, Hope and Glory, New Tricks and Miranda.

== Personal life ==
Juliet is the daughter of Val May, the theatre director, and his first wife, Penelope (formerly Rish).

== Career ==
May co-directed the television series The Lenny Henry Show in the 1980s. She oversaw all eight episodes of Heil Honey I'm Home! in 1990, a sitcom featuring Adolf Hitler and Eva Braun for British Satellite Broadcasting in 1990; only the pilot was ever transmitted. In 1995, she was nominated for a BAFTA award for Rory Bremner, Who Else?, and won a BAFTA Children's Award in 1999 for Microsoap produced by Andy Rowley, with whom May has collaborated on a number of productions. She directed all twelve episodes of Steven Moffat's 1997 school-based sitcom Chalk. She then directed Robert Bathurst in My Dad's the Prime Minister, and Dawn French and Catherine Tate in Wild West. She also directed some episodes of series V of Red Dwarf. May found it challenging to work with the science fiction elements of Red Dwarf and left before the series was finished, the remaining episodes were directed by Rob Grant and Doug Naylor. In 2008, she directed the BBC film Dustbin Baby. May then directed the BBC sitcom Miranda, starring Miranda Hart. In 2015, May directed episodes 3, 4 and 6 of British television drama series Ordinary Lies, for BBC One.

== Selected filmography ==
- The Treasure Seekers (1996)
