= Rob Grant =

English comedy writer (1955–2026)

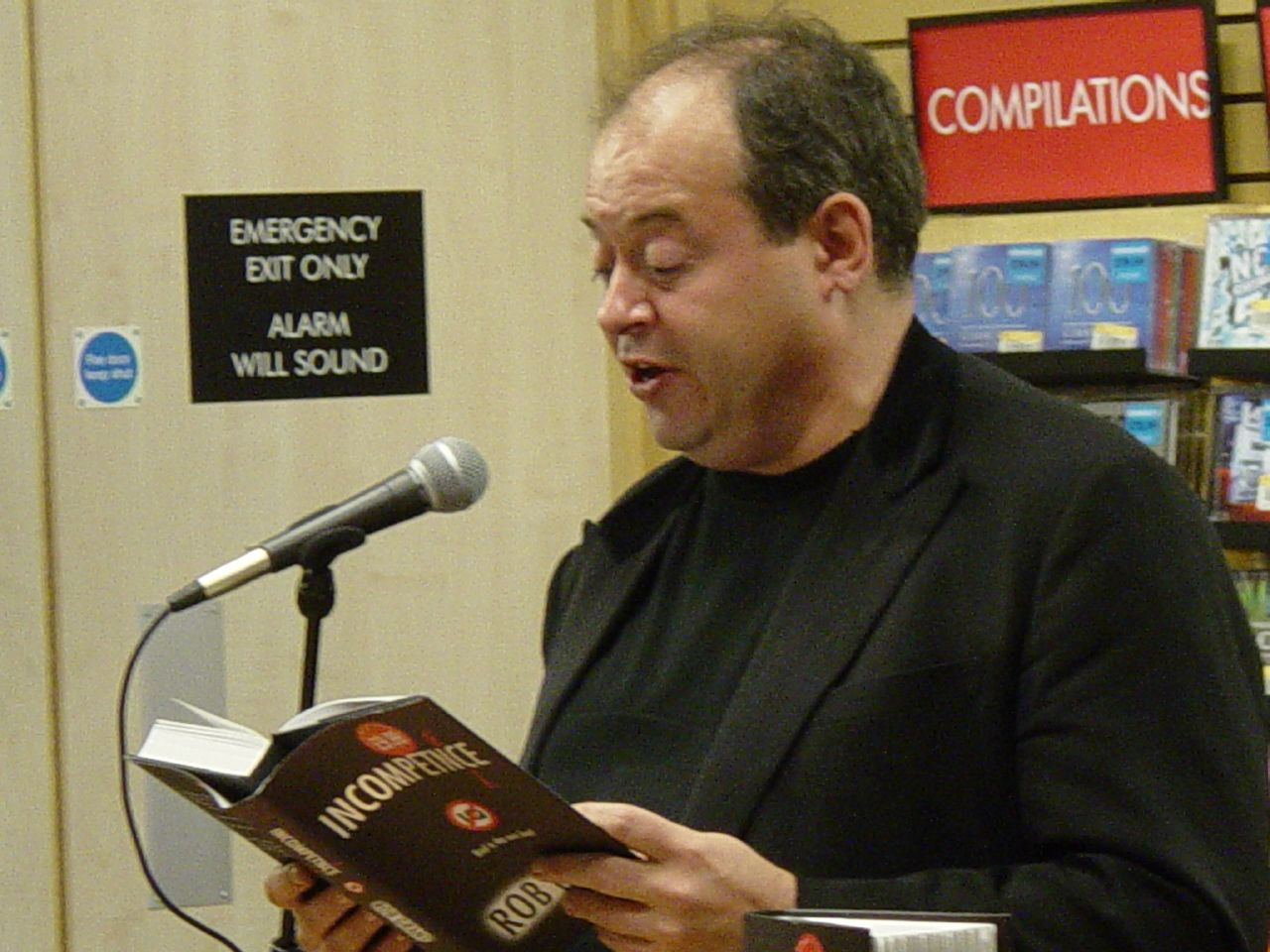
- Grant in 2004
- Born: Robert Grant; 25 September 1955; Salford, Lancashire, England
- Died: 25 February 2026 (aged 70)
- Education: University of Liverpool
- Occupations: Novelist; screenwriter; television producer
- Writing career
- Period: 1982–2026 (his death)
- Genres: Comedy; drama; adventure; science fiction
- Website: web.archive.org/web/20260227231805/http://www.robgrant.co.uk/Rob_Grant/Welcome.html

Robert Grant (25 September 1955 – 25 February 2026) was an English comedy writer, television producer and co-creator of the Red Dwarf comedy franchise. After Red Dwarf, Grant wrote two television series, The Strangerers and Dark Ages, and four solo novels, his last being Fat. During his career, Grant was involved in two distinct writing partnerships: the first with Doug Naylor – the two together being known as Grant Naylor – and the second with Andrew Marshall.

== Life and career ==
Grant was born in Salford on 25 September 1955. He met future collaborator Doug Naylor at Chetham's Hospital School, which he attended from the age of nine. The pair later studied Psychology at the University of Liverpool for two years, before both dropping out to pursue a writing career.

After providing a variety of comedy material on a freelance basis, the pair were hired to a contract for BBC Radio, working on programs such as the sketch shows Cliché and Son of Cliché, the original sitcom Wrinkles, and the topical show The News Huddlines.

Soon afterwards the duo started to also work in television, including Three of a Kind, which was produced by Paul Jackson, and contributing towards Carrott's Lib. In 1984, they began work on an original television sitcom pilot, based on a sketch from Son of Cliché, Red Dwarf. The BBC initially declined to commission the show and instead Grant and Naylor took a position as head writers on Spitting Image, joining midway through the first season. Apart from sketchwriting, Grant, with Naylor, wrote the lyrics to Spitting Images's "The Chicken Song", which topped the UK singles chart for three weeks in 1986.

In 1986, the BBC would eventually pick up Red Dwarf, with a commission from BBC North West. A first series, after some production delays, was broadcast in 1988, and was followed by another later that year. Grant and Naylor became producers of the show from its third series in 1989, and in a short period collaborated on two novelisations of Red Dwarf, travelled for work on an American spin-off, and worked on three more British series. They also worked together on a new sitcom set in a theatrical agency, called The 10%ers.

By the time of series one of The 10%ers, Grant had broken up the writing partnership with Naylor. Grant himself later described this decision as being "basically 'musical differences'", and also said he "didn't want Red Dwarf to be the only thing on [his] tombstone".

Grant created two more television comedies, being ITV's Dark Ages (1999), and Sky One's The Strangerers (2000). He wrote four solo science-fiction novels: a Red Dwarf novel, Backwards (1996); Colony; Incompetence; and Fat.

In the 2010s, Grant started a new collaboration with Andrew Marshall, previously writer on 1990s British sitcom 2point4 Children. Together they produced, directed and wrote The Quanderhorn Xperimentations for BBC Radio 4, along with a novelisation published by Gollancz, and then also a sketch show called The Nether Regions.

Grant also began re-engaging with Red Dwarf in the late 2010s. He appeared at a Red Dwarf convention in 2018, and then with Paul Jackson and director Ed Bye provided the Quarantine Commentaries of the first three series of Red Dwarf during the 2020 coronavirus lockdown. In February 2021, a short Red Dwarf script, Into the Gloop, which was performed live via Zoom as part of the Official Red Dwarf Fan Club's Holly Hop convention.

A legal dispute over the Red Dwarf rights was resolved in 2023., and a prequel spin-off, Red Dwarf: Titan, to be written by Grant with Marshall, was announced soon thereafter. This was formally announced as a novel on 19 February 2026, to be published in July 2026. Grant died suddenly less than a week later on 25 February 2026, at the age of 70. His death was announced the following day.

== Filmography ==
Year	Production	Credits	Notes	Ref.
1982	Carrott's Lib	Writer (Note: With Doug Naylor)		
1984	Pushing Up Daisies	Writer		
1985–1986	Spitting Image	Writer	16 episodes	
1986	Comic Relief	Writer	"Spitting Image's Royal Address"	
1986	Spitting Image: Down and Out in the White House	Writer		
1986	Spitting Image: The Ronnie and Nancy Show	Writer		
1987	Spitting Image: The 1987 Movie Awards	Writer		
1988–1993	Red Dwarf	Creator, writer, producer (from 1989), director (1992)	36 episodes	
1992	Red Dwarf USA	Creator and writer	Unaired pilot	
1993	The 10%ers	Creator and writer	Pilot episode	
1999	Dark Ages	Creator and writer	5 episodes	
2000	The Strangerers	Creator and writer		

== Bibliography ==
- Red Dwarf (1989), co-written with Doug Naylor (published under the joint pseudonym Grant Naylor); sometimes referred to as Red Dwarf: Infinity Welcomes Careful Drivers.
- Better Than Life (1990), co-written with Doug Naylor (published under the joint pseudonym Grant Naylor).
- Primordial Soup (1993), co-written with Doug Naylor (collection of scripts from the TV show Red Dwarf)
- Son Of Soup (1996), co-written with Doug Naylor (second volume of Red Dwarf scripts)
- Scenes From The Dwarf (1996), co-written with Doug Naylor (making of Red Dwarf)
- Backwards (1996), a sequel to Better Than Life.
- Colony (2000), a science fiction story about a colony that has long since lost its way.
- Incompetence (2003), a wry detective story set in the near future where it is illegal to discriminate for any reason, even incompetence.
- Fat (2006), a darkly comic novel about how the media portrays obesity and its effects on society.
- The Quanderhorn Xperimentations (2018), with Andrew Marshall, a science fiction story set in 1952 with echoes of Quatermass.
- The Nether Regions (2019), with Andrew Marshall (BBC Radio 4)
- Red Dwarf: Titan (2026), with Andrew Marshall (prequel novel)
