= List of The Kenny Everett Video Show episodes =

The Kenny Everett Video Show (later renamed The Kenny Everett Video Cassette) was a British television comedy and music programme produced by Thames Television for the ITV network from 3 July 1978 to 21 May 1981.

This is a list of episodes including its four series and three Christmas / New Year specials. Dates listed are original airdates.

== Series ==
Series	Episodes	Originally released	
Series	Episodes	First released	Last released
1	8	3 July 1978	21 August 1978
2	10	19 February 1979	30 April 1979
3	8	18 February 1980	14 April 1980
4	6	16 April 1981	21 May 1981

== Episodes ==
=== Series 1 (1978) ===
The first episode of The Kenny Everett Video Show aired at 6:45pm on Monday 3 July 1978. The eight-part series consisted mostly of musical performances, alongside Hot Gossip routines, Captain Kremmen cartoons, archive clips and occasional OB segments.

No. overall	No. in series	Title	Musical guests	Other guests	Original release date
1	1	"Series 1, Episode 1"	Steve Gibbons Band • Bryan Ferry • Wings • Bonnie Tyler • Electric Light Orchestra	Elton John (VT inserts)	3 July 1978
Featured tracks: Steve Gibbons Band: "Eddy Vortex"; Bryan Ferry: "Sign of the Times"; Wings: "I've Had Enough" / "London Town"; Bonnie Tyler: "If I Sing You a Love Song"; Electric Light Orchestra: "Wild West Hero"; Hot Gossip routine: "Supernature" by Cerrone Rock of Ages segment: Dickie Pride: "Slippin' and Slidin'" (archive clip from Oh Boy!) DVD edits: "I've Had Enough", "London Town" and "Wild West Hero" removed from Network DVD release.
2	2	"Series 1, Episode 2"	Darts • Kate Bush • Lindisfarne • Yellow Dog • The Rolling Stones	N/A	10 July 1978
Featured tracks: Darts: "Who's That Knocking?"; Kate Bush: "The Man with the Child in His Eyes"; Lindisfarne: "Run For Home"; Yellow Dog: "Gee, Officer Krupke"; The Rolling Stones: "Respectable"; Hot Gossip routine: "Floyd's Theme" by Natural Juices Video Vault segment: Heinz's Great American Soup commercial with Ann Miller DVD edits: "The Man with the Child in His Eyes", "Respectable" and Kate Bush interview sketch removed from Network DVD release.
3	3	"Series 1, Episode 3"	Suzi Quatro • Nick Lowe • Gordon Giltrap	Thin Lizzy • Bob Dylan (film inserts)	17 July 1978
Featured tracks: Suzi Quatro: "The Race Is On"; Nick Lowe: "So It Goes"; Thin Lizzy: "Rosalie" (promo clip); Gordon Giltrap: "Heartsong"; Bob Dylan: "Baby, Let Me Follow You Down" (promo clip); Hot Gossip routine: "If My Friends Could See Me Now" by Linda Clifford Video Vault segment: Bambi Meets Godzilla DVD edits: "Rosalie" and "Baby, Let Me Follow You Down" removed from Network DVD release.
4	4	"Series 1, Episode 4"	The Moody Blues • The Pirates	The Who (film insert) • Robin Askwith • Janet Brown • Tim Brooke-Taylor	24 July 1978
Featured tracks: The Moody Blues: "Steppin' in a Slide Zone" / "Had to Fall in Love"; The Pirates: "Johnny B. Goode's Good"; The Who: "Who Are You" (promo clip); Hot Gossip routine: "Walk on the Wild Side" by Lou Reed Rock of Ages segment: Cliff Richard, Marty Wilde and Dickie Pride with The Vernons Girls: "Three Cool Cats" (archive clip from Oh Boy!)
5	5	"Series 1, Episode 5"	Elkie Brooks • The Rolling Stones • Renaissance • Justin Hayward	N/A	31 July 1978
Featured tracks: Elkie Brooks: "Pearl's a Singer"; Renaissance: "Northern Lights"; Justin Hayward: "Forever Autumn"; Hot Gossip routine: "Honky Tonk Women" by The Rolling Stones Video Vault segment: Jeno's Pizza Rolls commercial
6	6	"Series 1, Episode 6"	Darts • Bonnie Tyler • City Boy	10cc (film insert)	7 August 1978
Featured tracks: Darts: "It's Raining"; 10cc: "Dreadlock Holiday" (promo clip); Bonnie Tyler: "Living for the City"; Cliff Richard: "Please Remember Me"; City Boy: "5-7-0-5"; Hot Gossip routine: "Theme from Shaft" by Isaac Hayes Rock of Ages segment: Cliff Richard: "Turn Me Loose" (archive clip from Oh Boy!) DVD edits: "Please Remember Me" removed from Network DVD release.
7	7	"Series 1, Episode 7"	Steve Gibbons Band • Bryan Ferry • The Moody Blues • Labi Siffre	David Essex (film insert)	14 August 1978
Featured tracks: David Essex: "Oh What a Circus" (promo clip); Steve Gibbons Band: "Tulane"; Bryan Ferry: "What Goes On"; The Moody Blues: "Driftwood"; Labi Siffre: "Solid Love"; Hot Gossip routine: Supernature by Cerrone
8	8	"Series 1, Episode 8"	Wings • Suzi Quatro • The Boomtown Rats • Marshall Hain	N/A	21 August 1978
Featured tracks: Wings: "London Town"; Suzi Quatro: "Don't Change My Luck"; The Boomtown Rats: "Rat Trap"; Marshall Hain: "Coming Home"; Hot Gossip routine: "Stuff Like That" by Quincy Jones DVD edits: "London Town" removed from Network DVD release.

=== Series 2 (1979) ===
Prior to the second series, the programme returned on New Year's Day 1979 in most ITV regions (except Scottish Television, which aired the special on 7 January 1979) with the Didn't Quite Make it in Time for Christmas Video Show, which also aired in a shortened version on 18 April 1979 - as ITV's entry for the Golden Rose of Montreux.

Series Two began at 7:00pm on Monday 19 February 1979 with an extended ten-episode run (30 minutes per episode) and a greater reliance on comedy material.

No. overall	No. in series	Title	Guests	Original release date
10	1	"Series 2, Episode 1"	Elvis Costello and The Attractions • David Essex	19 February 1979
Featured tracks: Elvis Costello and The Attractions: "Oliver's Army"; David Essex: "Imperial Wizard"; Hot Gossip routine: "I Feel Love" by Donna Summer Video Vault clip: Alka-Seltzer commercial from the United States. Production notes: "Oliver's Army" lyric censored on That’s TV Gold's 2021 repeat
11	2	"Series 2, Episode 2"	Dave Edmunds and Rockpile • Cliff Richard	26 February 1979
Featured tracks: Dave Edmunds and Rockpile: "Trouble Boys"; Cliff Richard: "Green Light"; Hot Gossip routine: "Hot Child in the City" by Nick Gilder Video Vault clip: Uncle Bill's Wines and Spirits commercial from Australia.
12	3	"Series 2, Episode 3"	Levinsky / Sinclair (ft. Richard O'Brien) • Kate Bush • Thin Lizzy • Cliff Richard (cameo)	5 March 1979
Featured tracks: Levinsky / Sinclair: "Only Feel This Way"; Kate Bush: Wow; Thin Lizzy: Waiting for an Alibi; Hot Gossip routine: "Contact" by Edwin Starr Video Vault clip: Marilyn Monroe commercial for Union Oil Company DVD edits: "Wow" removed from Network DVD release.
13	4	"Series 2, Episode 4"	The Real Thing • Bonnie Tyler • Leo Sayer	12 March 1979
Featured tracks: The Real Thing: "Can You Feel the Force?"; Bonnie Tyler: "My Guns Are Loaded"; Leo Sayer: "Stormy Weather"; Hot Gossip routine: "Oh Happy Day" by Roberta Kelly DVD edits: "My Guns Are Loaded" removed from Network DVD release.
14	5	"Series 2, Episode 5"	Darts • The Pretenders • Roxy Music	19 March 1979
Featured tracks: Darts: "Get It"; The Pretenders: "Stop Your Sobbing"; Roxy Music: "Trash"; Hot Gossip routine: "All Right Now" by Free
15	6	"Series 2, Episode 6"	The Average White Band • Kiki Dee • The Pretenders (cameo) • David Essex	26 March 1979
Featured tracks: The Average White Band: "Atlantic Avenue"; Kiki Dee: "One Jump Ahead of the Storm"; David Essex: "Let It Flow"; Hot Gossip routine: "Le Freak" by Chic
16	7	"Series 2, Episode 7"	Squeeze • Frankie Miller • Dean Friedman	2 April 1979
Featured tracks: Squeeze: "Cool for Cats"; Frankie Miller: "Good to See You"; Dean Friedman: "Rocking Chair (It's Gonna Be Alright)"; Hot Gossip routine: "The Eve of the War" by Jeff Wayne
17	8	"Series 2, Episode 8"	The Pretenders (cameo) • Justin Hayward • Gerry Rafferty • Tina Turner	9 April 1979
Featured tracks: Justin Hayward: "Marie"; Gerry Rafferty: "Night Owl"; Tina Turner: "Sometimes When We Touch"; Hot Gossip routine: "The Number One Song in Heaven" by Sparks
18	9	"Series 2, Episode 9"	Wings • Rachel Sweet • David Bowie	23 April 1979
Featured tracks: Wings: "Goodnight Tonight"; Rachel Sweet: "I Go to Pieces"; David Bowie: "Boys Keep Swinging"; Hot Gossip routine: "(I Can't Get No) Satisfaction" by The Rolling Stones DVD edits: "Goodnight Tonight" removed from Network DVD release.
19	10	"Series 2, Episode 10"	M • David Essex • The Moody Blues	30 April 1979
Featured tracks: M: "Pop Muzik"; David Essex: "20 Flights Up"; The Moody Blues: "Nights in White Satin"; Hot Gossip routine: "Supernature" by Cerrone (Video Vault reprise from S1E7) DVD edits: "Pop Muzik" removed from Network DVD release.

=== Series 3 (1980) ===
The Video Show returned at 11:00pm on New Year's Eve 1979 with an hour-long special, Will Kenny Everett Make it to 1980? on most of the ITV network. Scottish Television aired it the following afternoon while Grampian Television opted out of the final part on its original transmission.

Series 3 ran for eight episodes, starting at 7:00pm on Monday 18 February 1980.

No. overall	No. in series	Title	Guests	Original release date
21	1	"Series 3, Episode 1"	Gary Numan • The Shadows • The Pretenders • Freddie Mercury (cameo) • Katie Boyle	18 February 1980
Featured tracks: Gary Numan: "I Die: You Die"; The Shadows: "Riders in the Sky"; The Pretenders: "Talk of The Town"; Hot Gossip routine: "Bridge over Troubled Water" by Linda Clifford Production notes: "Riders in the Sky" replaced by Love Deluxe in original US airing
22	2	"Series 3, Episode 2"	The Boomtown Rats • Suzi Quatro • Cliff Richard	25 February 1980
Featured tracks: The Boomtown Rats: "Someone's Looking at You"; Suzi Quatro: "Mama's Boy"; Cliff Richard: "Living Doll" (acoustic); Hot Gossip routine: "Another Brick in the Wall" by Pink Floyd Production notes: "Someone's Looking at You" repeated from The Will Kenny Everett Make It to 1980? Show
23	3	"Series 3, Episode 3"	Dave Edmunds and Rockpile • Cliff Richard • Dusty Springfield (cameo) • Anna Dawson	3 March 1980
Featured tracks: Dave Edmunds and Rockpile: "Singing the Blues"; Cliff Richard: "Carrie"; Hot Gossip routine: "The Hardest Part" by Blondie Video Vault clip: Technics cassette tapes commercial from Japan
24	4	"Series 3, Episode 4"	Dusty Springfield • Elvis Costello and The Attractions • The Police • David Essex (cameo)	10 March 1980
Featured tracks: Dusty Springfield: "Your Love Still Brings Me to My Knees"; Elvis Costello and The Attractions: "I Can't Stand Up For Falling Down"; The Police: "The Bed's Too Big Without You"; Hot Gossip routine: "Working Day and Night" by Michael Jackson Video Vault clip: Joe Frazier commercial for Miller Lite
25	5	"Series 3, Episode 5"	Ellen Foley • David Essex	17 March 1980
Featured tracks: Ellen Foley: "Stupid Girl"; David Essex: Silver Dream Machine; Hot Gossip routine: "Baby Talks Dirty" by The Knack
26	6	"Series 3, Episode 6"	Sky • The Boomtown Rats • Suzi Quatro (cameo)	24 March 1980
Featured tracks: Sky: "Toccata"; The Boomtown Rats: "Keep It Up"; Hot Gossip routine: "Street Life" by The Crusaders ft. Randy Crawford DVD edits: "Toccata" removed from Network DVD release.
27	7	"Series 3, Episode 7"	Suzi Quatro • 10cc (film insert) • Joe Jackson	31 March 1980
Featured tracks: Suzi Quatro: "I've Never Been in Love"; 10cc: "One-Two-Five" (promo clip); Joe Jackson: "Kinda Kute"; Hot Gossip routine: "Money (That's What I Want)" by The Flying Lizards Video Vault clip: Cadbury Crunchie bar commercial (New Zealand)
28	8	"Series 3, Episode 8"	The Police • Pete Townshend • Paul McCartney	14 April 1980
Featured tracks: The Police: "It's Alright For You"; Pete Townshend: "Rough Boys"; Paul McCartney: "Coming Up"; Hot Gossip routine: "Rebel Rebel" by David Bowie DVD edits: "Coming Up" removed from Network DVD release.

=== Series 4 (Video Cassette, 1981) ===
Everett's last New Year's special, The Kenny Everett New Year's Daze Show aired at 11:50pm on New Year's Eve 1980 over most of the ITV network. Ulster Television never aired this special, while Grampian and Scottish broadcast it two days later.

The final series, renamed The Kenny Everett Video Cassette, saw the show moved to Thursday evenings at 7:30pm in a bid to compete with BBC1's Top of the Pops. Unhappy with the scheduling of the series, among other issues, Everett left Thames and moved to BBC Television.

No. overall	No. in series	Title	Musical guests	Other guests	Original release date
30	1	"Series 4, Episode 1"	BA Robertson	Mel Smith • Lennie Bennett • David Essex • Anna Dawson • Philip Elsmore	16 April 1981
Featured track: Saint Saens by BA Robertson; Hot Gossip routine: Love on the Phone by Suzanne Fellini
31	2	"Series 4, Episode 2"	The Pretenders	Billy Connolly • Tom O'Connor • Cliff Richard • Anna Dawson • Barry Cryer (voiceover)	23 April 1981
Featured track: Louie, Louie by The Pretenders; Hot Gossip routine: Muscle Bound by Hot Gossip
32	3	"Series 4, Episode 3"	Hot Chocolate	Terry Wogan • Michael Aspel • Anna Dawson	30 April 1981
Featured track: Losing You by Hot Chocolate; Hot Gossip routine: Tell Everybody by Herbie Hancock
33	4	"Series 4, Episode 4"	Cliff Richard	Bernard Manning • Billy Connolly • Anna Dawson	7 May 1981
Featured tracks: Move It and Take Another Look by Cliff Richard; Hot Gossip routine: Press Darlings by Hot Gossip
34	5	"Series 4, Episode 5"	Chas & Dave	Mel Smith • Terry Wogan • Anna Dawson • Barry Cryer (voiceover)	14 May 1981
Featured track: Poor Old Mr. Woogie by Chas & Dave; Hot Gossip routine: All Stood Still by Hot Gossip
35	6	"Series 4, Episode 6"	Dire Straits	Michael Aspel • Lionel Blair • Anna Dawson • Barry Cryer (voiceover)	21 May 1981
Featured track: Skateaway by Dire Straits; Hot Gossip routine: Houses in Motion by Talking Heads

=== Specials ===
No. overall	No. in series	Title	Guests	Original release date
9	1	"The Didn't Quite Make it in Time for Christmas Video Show"	Rod Stewart • Leo Sayer	1 January 1979
Featured tracks: Rod Stewart: Maggie May / Da Ya Think I'm Sexy?; Leo Sayer: Raining in My Heart; Hot Gossip routine: Ease On down the Road by Diana Ross and Michael Jackson
20	2	"The "Will Kenny Everett Make It to 1980?" Show"	Bryan Ferry • Suzi Quatro • The Boomtown Rats • Cliff Richard • David Bowie • Thin Lizzy • The Sex Pistols	31 December 1979
Featured tracks: Roxy Music: In the Midnight Hour; The Boomtown Rats: Someone's Looking at You; Cliff Richard: Devil Woman; David Bowie: Space Oddity; The Greedies (Thin Lizzy and The Sex Pistols): A Merry Jingle; Hot Gossip routines: Brown Sugar by The Rolling Stones / Sleazy by Village People
29	3	"The Kenny Everett New Year's Daze Show"	Anna Dawson • David Essex • Billy Connolly • Bernard Manning	31 December 1980
Featured track: Heart On My Sleeve by David Essex; Hot Gossip routine: All Stood Still by Hot Gossip
