= Cerrone discography =

- Studio albums: 23
- Soundtrack albums: 6
- Live albums: 5
- Compilation albums: 19
- Singles: 69
- Box sets: 4

The discography of French disco musician Cerrone, including the discography of Kongas, in which Cerrone was a member during the 1970s, consists of 23 studio albums, 5 live albums, and 19 compilation albums.

== Albums ==
=== Studio albums ===
Year	Title	Details	Peak chart positions							
Year	Title	Details	FRA	AUT	BE (WA)	CAN Dance	IT	UK	US	US R&B
1974	Kongas	Released: 1974; Label: Barclay; As part of Kongas	—	—	—	—	—	—	—	—
1976	Love in C Minor	Released: 1976; Label: Malligator, Cotillion, Atlantic	4	—	—	—	4	—	153	55
1977	Cerrone's Paradise	Released: June 1977; Label: Malligator, Cotillion, Atlantic	3	—	—	—	2	—	162	52
1977	Africanism	Released: 1977; Label: Crocos, Polydor; As part of Kongas	—	—	—	2	—	—	120	—
1977	Supernature (Cerrone 3)	Released: September 1977; Label: Malligator, Cotillion, Atlantic	1	13	—	1	8	60	129	56
1978	Anikana-O	Released: 1978; Label: Barclay, Salsoul; As part of Kongas	—	—	—	—	—	—	—	—
1978	The Golden Touch (Cerrone IV)	Released: 1978; Label: Malligator, Cotillion, Atlantic	1	—	—	4	7	—	118	49
1979	Angelina (Cerrone V)	Released: 1979; Label: Malligator, Atlantic	23	—	—	—	—	—	—	—
1980	Panic (Cerrone VI)	Released: February 1980; Label: Malligator	5	—	—	—	—	—	—	—
1980	You Are the One (Cerrone VII)	Released: November 1980; Label: Malligator	—	—	—	—	—	—	—	—
1982	Back Track (Cerrone VIII)	Released: January 1982; Label: Malligator	30	—	—	—	—	—	—	—
1982	Your Love Survived (Cerrone IX)	Released: June 1982; Label: Malligator	—	—	—	—	—	—	—	—
1983	Where Are You Now	Released: 1983; Label: Malligator	—	—	—	—	—	—	—	—
1985	The Collector	Released: 1985; Label: Malligator	—	—	—	—	—	—	—	—
1989	Way In	Released: 1989; Label: NAC Company	—	—	—	—	—	—	—	—
1992	Dream	Released: 1992; Label: NAC Company	—	—	—	—	—	—	—	—
1993	X-Xex	Released: 1993; Label: Malligator	—	—	—	—	—	—	—	—
1994	Human Nature	Released: 1994; Label: EMI France	—	—	—	—	—	—	—	—
2002	Hysteria	Released: 17 December 2002; Label: Malligator	82	—	—	—	—	—	—	—
2007	Celebrate !	Released: 25 June 2007; Label: Malligator	76	—	—	—	—	—	—	—
2010	Cerrone Symphony – Variations of Supernature	Released: 15 February 2010; Label: Malligator	164	—	—	—	—	—	—	—
2016	Red Lips	Released: 28 October 2016; Label: Because Music, Malligator	83	—	—	—	—	—	—	—
2020	DNA	Released: 7 February 2020; Label: Because Music, Malligator	92	—	150	—	—	—	—	—
"—" denotes releases that did not chart or were not released in that territory.

=== Live albums ===
Year	Title	Details	Peak chart positions
Year	Title	Details	FRA
1979	Cerrone in Concert	Released: 1979; Label: Malligator; Recorded in December 1978 at the Pavillon de Paris	17
1983	En concert – Paris 1983	Released: 1983; Label: Malligator; Recorded in 1983 at the Espace Balard, Paris	—
2003	Live – Hysteria Party	Released: 10 December 2003; Label: Malligator; Recorded in January 2003 at the Olympia, Paris; Includes a DVD of the concert	—
2005	Dance Party – Live at Versailles	Released: 17 November 2005; Label: Malligator; Recorded in July 2005 in Versailles; Includes a DVD of the concert	—
2012	Live at the Montreux Jazz Festival	Released: 6 September 2012; Label: Malligator; Recorded in July 2012 at the Montreux Jazz Festival	—
"—" denotes releases that did not chart or were not released in that territory.

=== Soundtrack albums and other productions ===
Year	Title	Details
1978	Brigade mondaine	Released: July 1978; Label: Malligator; Soundtrack to the film of the same name, known in English as Victims of Vice
1979	Brigade mondaine : La secte de Marrakech	Released: July 1979; Label: Malligator; Soundtrack to the film of the same name, known in English as Marrakesh Cult
1980	Brigade mondaine : Vaudou aux Caraïbes	Released: June 1980; Label: Malligator; Soundtrack to the film of the same name, known in English as Super Witch of Love Island
1988	The Collector – A Marc Cerrone Opéra	Released: 1988; Label: New Age Company; Rock opera based on The Collector
1990	Dancing Machine	Released: 1990; Label: CBS; Soundtrack to the film of the same name
2005	Orange mécanique – The Score	Released: 8 December 2005; Label: Malligator; Score for an adaptation of A Clockwork Orange
2016	Afro	Released: 12 February 2016; Label: Because Music; EP with Tony Allen and Manu Dibango

=== Compilation albums ===
Year	Title	Details	Peak chart positions	
Year	Title	Details	FRA	BE (WA)
1981	The Best of Cerrone	Released: 1981; Label: Malligator	—	—
1986	Cerrone's Collection	Released: 1986; Label: New Age Company	—	—
1990	The Best of Cerrone	Released: January 1990; Label: Hot Productions, Malligator; US-only release	—	—
1990	Je Suis Music	Released: 1990; Label: CBS	—	—
1990	Love in C Minor	Released: 1990; Label: CBS	—	—
1990	Supernature	Released: 1990; Label: CBS	—	—
1991	1976–1991	Released: 1991; Label: Columbia	—	—
1995	Best	Released: 1995; Label: Pure, EMI France	—	—
1997	Best of Remixes	Released: 1997; Label: Arcade	—	—
2001	Cerrone by Bob Sinclar	Released: 6 June 2001; Label: Barclay, Malligator	13	26
2004	Culture	Released: 10 November 2004; Label: Malligator; A version with two concert DVDs titled Cerrone Culture – The Complete Video Anthology was also released	—	96
2008	Love Ritual – Glamorous Lounge Selection	Released: 7 July 2008; Label: Malligator	—	—
2009	Cerrone by Jamie Lewis	Released: 8 May 2009; Label: Malligator; Switzerland-only release	—	—
2011	Club Mixes	Released: 2 August 2011; Label: Malligator	—	—
2012	Addict	Released: 22 October 2012; Label: Malligator	—	—
2013	Underworld – The Anthology	Released: 25 March 2013; Label: Big Break	—	—
2014	The Best of Kongas	Released: 27 October 2014; Label: Because Music	—	—
2015	The Best of Cerrone Productions	Released: 26 January 2015; Label: Because Music	145	162
2015	Give Me Remixes	Released: 30 October 2015; Label: Because Music, Malligator	—	—
2022	Cerrone by Cerrone	Released: 14 October 2022; Label: Because Music, Malligator	11	—
"—" denotes releases that did not chart or were not released in that territory.

=== Box sets ===
Year	Title	Details
2003	Collector Box	Released: 2003; Label: Malligator; Limited vinyl box set
2014	I II III	Released: 15 November 2014; Label: Because Music; Limited CD and vinyl box set
2014	Brigade mondaine	Released: 21 November 2014; Label: Because Music; Limited CD and vinyl box set of the soundtracks to all three films
2015	Cerrone IV, VII, Give Me Remixes	Released: 4 May 2015; Label: Because Music; Limited official deluxe box set

== Singles ==
Year	Single	Peak chart positions										Certifications	Album
Year	Single	FRA	BE (WA)	CAN Dance	IRE	IT	SPA	UK	US	US Dance	US R&B	Certifications	Album
1972	"Jungle" (as part of Kongas)	—	—	—	—	—	—	—	—	—	—		Kongas
1973	"Anikana-O" (as part of Kongas)	—	—	—	—	—	—	—	—	37	—		Kongas
1974	"Pastel" (as part of Kongas)	—	—	—	—	—	—	—	—	—	—		Kongas
1976	"Love in C Minor"	25	3	—	—	21	6	31	36	2	29		Love in C Minor
1977	"Cerrone's Paradise"	17	18	—	—	8	26	—	—	6	—		Cerrone's Paradise
1977	"Africanism"/"Gimme Some Lovin'" (as part of Kongas)	—	—	3	—	—	—	—	84	3	—		Africanism
1977	"Black Is Black" (Germany-only release)	—	—	—	—	—	—	—	—	—	—		Love in C Minor
1977	"Supernature"	26	—	1	11	23	—	8	70	1	72	BPI: Silver	Supernature (Cerrone 3)
1978	"Give Me Love"	2	—	—	—	—	—	—	—	—	—		Supernature (Cerrone 3)
1978	"Je Suis Music"	4	—	15	27	—	—	39	—	7	63		The Golden Touch (Cerrone IV)
1978	"Dr. Doo Dah" (as part of Kongas; US-only release)	—	—	—	—	—	—	—	—	—	—		Africanism
1979	"Look for Love"	—	—	—	—	—	—	—	—	—	—		The Golden Touch (Cerrone IV)
1979	"Rocket in the Pocket" (Italy-only release)	—	—	—	—	—	—	—	—	—	—		The Golden Touch (Cerrone IV)
1979	"Rock Me"	54	—	—	—	—	—	—	—	56	—		Angelina (Cerrone V)
1979	"Call Me Tonight"	48	—	—	—	—	—	—	—	—	—		Angelina (Cerrone V)
1980	"Panic"	49	—	—	—	—	—	—	—	—	—		Panic (Cerrone VI)
1980	"The Flash" (Italy-only release)	—	—	—	—	—	—	—	—	—	—		Panic (Cerrone VI)
1980	"Vaudou aux Caraïbes"	—	—	—	—	—	—	—	—	—	—		Brigade mondaine : Vaudou aux Caraïbes
1980	"Time Is Running Down"	—	—	—	—	—	—	—	—	—	—		Panic (Cerrone VI)
1980	"You Are the One"	64	—	—	—	—	—	—	—	56	—		You Are the One (Cerrone VII)
1980	"Hooked On You"	—	—	—	—	—	—	—	—	56	—		You Are the One (Cerrone VII)
1981	"Tripping on the Moon"	—	—	—	—	—	—	—	—	—	—		Back Track (Cerrone VIII)
1982	"Back Track"	—	—	—	—	—	—	—	—	32	85		Back Track (Cerrone VIII)
1982	"Workout"	—	—	—	—	—	—	—	—	—	—		Your Love Survived (Cerrone IX)
1983	"Cycle's Woman"	—	—	—	—	—	—	—	—	—	—		En concert
1983	"Baby Love" (as C. Orchestra)	—	—	—	—	—	—	—	—	—	—		En concert
1983	"Freak Connection"/"Standing in the Shadows of Love"	—	—	—	—	—	—	—	—	—	—		Non-album single
1983	"Where Are You Now"	—	—	—	—	—	—	—	—	—	—		Where Are You Now
1984	"Club Underworld"	—	—	—	—	—	—	—	—	34	—		Where Are You Now
1985	"The Collector	—	—	—	—	—	—	—	—	—	—		The Collector
1986	"Oops Oh No!" (with La Toya Jackson)	—	—	—	—	—	—	—	—	—	89		Cerrone's Collection
1987	"Flight of the Phoenix" (with Robey)	—	—	—	—	—	—	—	—	—	—		Non-album single
1988	"Light of Love"	—	—	—	—	—	—	—	—	—	—		Way In
1989	"Cerrone Megamix – Back to the Future"	—	—	—	—	—	—	—	—	—	—		Je Suis Music
1989	"Heart of Me" (with Laura Branigan)	—	—	—	—	—	—	—	—	—	—		Way In
1990	"Never Let a Day Go By"	—	—	—	—	—	—	—	—	—	—		Way In
1990	"I'm Gonna Take Another Chance on You" (featuring Ricky Lee)	—	—	—	—	—	—	—	—	—	—		Dancing Machine
1991	"Dancing Machine"	—	—	—	—	—	—	—	—	—	—		Dancing Machine
1992	"One More Night"	—	—	—	—	—	—	—	—	—	—		Dream
1992	"Got to Have Loving" (as part of Chance)	—	—	—	—	—	—	—	—	—	—		Non-album single
1993	"You-Him-Me"	—	—	—	—	—	—	—	—	—	—		X-Xex
1993	"Love and Be Loved"	—	—	—	—	—	—	—	—	—	—		Best
1994	"See Me"	—	—	—	—	—	—	—	—	—	—		Human Nature
1994	"Mercy"	—	—	—	—	—	—	83	—	48	—		Human Nature
1995	"You Are the One" (remixes)	—	—	—	—	—	—	—	—	—	—		Best of Remixes
1995	"Love in C Minor" (remix)	—	—	—	—	—	—	—	—	24	—		Best of Remixes
1996	"Planet" (The Todd Terry Remixes)	—	—	—	—	—	—	—	—	—	—		Best of Remixes
1996	"Supernature" (remix)	—	—	—	—	—	—	66	—	12	—		Best of Remixes
2001	"Give Me Love" (remix)	39	—	—	—	—	—	87	—	—	—		Cerrone by Bob Sinclar
2001	"Laissez-moi danser" (as Dalida by Cerrone)	—	—	—	—	—	—	—	—	—	—		Revolution
2001	"Supernature" (featuring She Belle)	69	—	—	—	—	—	—	—	—	—		Cerrone by Bob Sinclar
2002	"Hysteria"	72	—	—	—	—	—	—	—	—	—		Hysteria
2003	"The Only One"	—	—	—	—	—	—	—	—	—	—		Hysteria
2003	"Love on the Dancefloor" (featuring Eve Angeli)	—	—	—	—	—	—	—	—	—	—		Hysteria
2005	"Not Too Shabby" (Jamie Lewis Mixes)	—	—	—	—	—	—	—	—	—	—		Celebrate !
2006	"Supernature" (Joachim Garraud & Danny Tenaglia Mixes)	—	—	—	—	—	—	—	—	5	—		Non-album single
2007	"Love Ritual" (vs Louie Vega)	—	—	—	—	—	—	—	—	—	—		Celebrate !
2007	"Misunderstanding" (vs Sweet Connection)	—	—	—	—	—	—	—	—	—	—		Celebrate !
2007	"Laissez toucher" (vs Katherine Ellis)	—	—	—	—	—	—	—	—	—	—		Celebrate !
2008	"It Had to Be You" (Italy-only release)	—	—	—	—	—	—	—	—	—	—		Love Ritual
2009	"Tattoo Woman" (Switzerland-only release)	—	—	—	—	—	—	—	—	—	—		Cerrone by Jamie Lewis
2012	"Good Times I'm in Love" (featuring Adjäna)	—	—	—	—	—	—	—	—	46	—		Addict
2015	"Supernature" (featuring Beth Ditto)	—	—	—	—	—	—	—	—	—	—		The Best of Cerrone Productions
2015	"2nd Chance" (featuring Tony Allen)	—	—	—	—	—	—	—	—	—	—		Red Lips
2016	"Funk Makossa" (featuring Manu Dibango)	—	—	—	—	—	—	—	—	—	—		Afro
2016	"Monday Night" (featuring Kiesza)	—	—	—	—	—	—	—	—	—	—		Red Lips
2016	"Move Me" (featuring Brendan Reilly)	—	—	—	—	—	—	—	—	—	—		Red Lips
2017	"Kiss It Better" (featuring Yasmin)	—	—	—	—	—	—	—	—	—	—		Red Lips
2018	"Afro II"	—	—	—	—	—	—	—	—	—	—		Non-album single
2019	"The Impact"	—	—	—	—	—	—	—	—	—	—		DNA
2020	"Experience" (featuring Laylow)	—	—	—	—	—	—	—	—	—	—		DNA
"—" denotes releases that did not chart or were not released in that territory.
