= Kremmen: The Movie =

1980 British film by John Sunderland

- Directed by: John Sunderland
- Written by: Barry Cryer; Ray Cameron
- Produced by: Ray Cameron
- Starring: Kenny Everett
- Distributed by: EMI Films
- Release date: 1980 (UK)
- Running time: 25 minutes
- Country: United Kingdom
- Language: English
- Budget: Unknown
- Box office: Unknown

Kremmen: The Movie is a 1980 British science fiction comedy short animated film directed by John Sutherland and starring Kenny Everett. It was written by Barry Cryer and Ray Cameron.

The film itself is centred on Everett's sci-fi character, Captain Kremmen, a pastiche of Dan Dare.

== Plot ==
After a whole eon, Kremmen has been awarded The Most Fabulous Man in the World Apart from God Award, and is presented with an enormous, fully automated spaceship shaped like a Brain. While Dr. Gitfinger examines the controls, Carla persuades Kremmen to have casual sex with her in their private quarters.

On Earth, the United Nations, along with David Frost, hold a secret meeting concerning an unknown matter and decide to alert Kremmen, who is now watching a documentary-film about trawler fishing in the North Sea with Carla. They return to Earth and go to meet the homosexual Head of Universal Security, simply named "Q", who informs Kremmen that planets are disappearing.

Along with their new robot Benny, Kremmen and the crew follow what appears to be a giant space-monster (who is apparently eating the planets) into the Snoop Galaxy, where the ship is swallowed whole by the monster. By pumping the oxygen reserves into the monster's stomach, the ship is vomited out of the stomach and the crew are saved.

== Errors ==
- Throughout Everett's previous history with the Kremmen series, Gitfinger was named fully as Dr. Heinrich von Gitfinger. In this, he is named Wolfgang Amadeus Gitfinger (as a play on Wolfgang Amadeus Mozart)
- The ship's voice changes halfway through the film for an unknown reason
- The monster is never actually defeated, and the fate of the already-consumed planets is not revealed
- The colour of Q's dress suddenly changes from red to yellow to green throughout his monologue.

== Release ==
The film had a limited release to UK cinemas as a “short” to be shown before a main feature, but was mainly distributed as a video, accompanied by 30 minutes of dance routines by Hot Gossip. Like Everett's other film, Bloodbath at the House of Death, it is unavailable in the United States.

== Characters ==
All characters depicted are played by Kenny Everett:

- Captain Kremmen
- Carla
- Dr. Gitfinger

The above three are the only characters to have appeared in the TV series who appear in the film. Below are characters completely new to the Kremmen series:

- Sam the Stoolie (A sentient stool in a bar, Kremmen's undercover contact)
- Benny the Hunchbacked Robot
- Ship (The personality of Kremmen's new ship)
- Q (The homosexual Head of Universal Security)
- Arnie "I once played a club on The Moon but there was no Atmosphere" Schwarz (A robotic TV presenter)

== See also ==
- Captain Kremmen - The eponymous hero of the film
- Kenny Everett - The creator of the former
