= Lee Middleton =

Lee Middleton may refer to:

- Lee Everett Alkin (born 1937) British singer and psychic, called "Lady Lee" Middleton in the 1960s
- Lee Middleton (footballer) (born 1970), played twice for Coventry City in the 1989–90 English First Division
- Lee Middleton (Coronation Street), character played by Nicholas Bailey in 1996–97
