= That's Showbusiness =

- Genre: Game show
- Created by: Jeremy Pascall; Phil Swern
- Presented by: Mike Smith
- Starring: Team captains Gloria Hunniford (1989-91); Kenny Everett (1989-91)
- Theme music composer: Ed Welch (1989-91); Debbie Wiseman (1992-94); Helene Muddiman (1995-96)
- Country of origin: United Kingdom
- Original language: English
- No. of series: 8
- No. of episodes: 132 (inc. 8 specials)

Production
- Production location: New Broadcasting House
- Running time: 30 minutes
- Production company: BBC North

Original release
- Network: BBC1
- Release: 20 May 1989 – 8 July 1996

That's Showbusiness is a game show that aired on BBC1 from 20 May 1989 to 8 July 1996 and hosted by Mike Smith.

== Format ==
In the first three series, the game was played with two teams of three, with team captains Kenny Everett and Gloria Hunniford competing. From the fourth series onwards, the game was played with two teams of two celebrities with no team captains competing. The quiz was split into various rounds and scoring was usually two points per answer or one point if offered across to the opposing team for a bonus. The rounds altered slightly from series to series. The following featured significantly:

- Three Questions – based on a comedy clip.
- Romantic Triangles – where the teams must try and guess which celebrity two other celebrities had been romantically involved with.
- Guess which of these three people said this particular quote
- Movie – Each team member would see a clip of a classic or newly released film and asked relevant questions on the film and/or its stars.
- Videoke – Each team would sing along to a music video or performance, the video would fade out and hopefully, when it was faded back in again, they would be in the right place.
- "Quickfire" – 12 themed questions to be answered alternately by teammates within one minute.

== Transmissions ==
=== Series ===
Series	Start date	End date	Episodes
1	20 May 1989	26 August 1989	14
2	2 June 1990	25 August 1990	12
3	20 April 1991	13 July 1991	13
4	11 April 1992	18 July 1992	14
5	9 January 1993	3 April 1993	13
6	17 January 1994	15 August 1994	27
7	6 March 1995	13 September 1995	26
8	1 April 1996	8 July 1996	13

=== Specials ===
Date	Entitle
30 December 1989	Holiday Special
31 December 1990	New Year's Eve Special
31 December 1991	New Year's Eve Special
31 December 1992	New Year's Eve Special
20 December 1993	Christmas Special
22 December 1994	Christmas Special
18 February 1995	Eastenders Special
29 December 1995	Movies Special
