= John Alkin =

British actor (born 1947)

- Born: John Kenneth Foinquinos; 17 January 1947 (age 79); Rugby, Warwickshire, England
- Occupations: Actor; spiritual healer
- Years active: 1970–1984 (acting); 1980s–present (spiritual healer)
- Spouses: Lesley Gail (m. 1971, divorced) Lee Middleton (m. 1985; died 2022)
- Children: 2

John Alkin (born 17 January 1947) is an English actor turned spiritual healer. He was born in Rugby, Warwickshire, under the name John Kenneth Foinquinos.

== Biography ==
=== Early life ===
After attending public school at Stamford until the age of 18, Alkin went onto study at Cheltenham College. There, he started a hotel management course, training as a chef, intending to follow in the family business of catering. However, he took an interest in the college drama productions and after the establishment won an inter-country drama festival he decided to change his career to the stage.

In 1966, Alkin was taken on by Everyman Theatre as an assistant stage manager, doing odd jobs like making tea and sweeping up. Gradually, he worked his way up and after a year with the company, moved to London, appearing at theatres in Richmond and Bromley, as well as having appearances on television.

=== Acting career ===
Alkin is best remembered for two roles: DC Tom Daniels in Thames Television's police drama The Sweeney and barrister Barry Deeley Q.C. in Granada Television's drama Crown Court. One of his earliest television appearances was as Robert Martin in the 1972 BBC TV production of Jane Austen's Emma.

In 1978 Alkin played Flight Lieutenant Andre De Beers, a character based on the real-life Baron Jean de Selys Longchamps DFC, who attacks the Gestapo Headquarters in Brussels, German-occupied Belgium, in the Secret Army episode "Day of Wrath".

He also appeared in numerous guest roles on TV shows such as Z-Cars, Timeslip, Minder, The Sandbaggers, Space: 1999 and Doctor Who.

=== Spiritual healing ===
He left acting in the mid-1980s to set up a spiritual healing centre with his second wife, Lee Everett Alkin, former wife of DJ and TV comic Kenny Everett. He was involved in meditation and became aware of its healing powers as a teenager in the 1960s.

== Filmography ==
Year	Title	Role	Notes
1970	The Games	John	
1976	The Liver Birds	Rex	
1977	Sweeney!	Det. Sgt. Tom Daniels	
1978	Sweeney 2	Det. Sgt. Tom Daniels	
1978	No Longer Alone	Bruce	
1979	The Lady Vanishes	Party Guest #1	
1978	Secret Army	Flight Lieutenant Andre De Beers	
