= The Kenny Everett Television Show =

BBC comedy sketch show 1981–1988

- Written by: Barry Cryer; Kenny Everett; Ray Cameron (Series 1–3); Andrew Marshall (series 4–5); David Renwick (series 4–5)
- Directed by: Bill Wilson (series 1–2); John Bishop (series 3–4); Kevin Bishop (series 5)
- Starring: Kenny Everett; Cleo Rocos; Lou Hirsch; Billy Connolly; Sheila Steafel; Lionel Blair; John Arnatt; Willie Rushton
- Country of origin: United Kingdom
- Original language: English
- No. of seasons: 5
- No. of episodes: 47 (including 6 specials)

Production
- Production locations: BBC Television Centre, White City, London
- Running time: 30 minutes
- Production company: BBC Television

Original release
- Network: BBC1
- Release: 24 December 1981 – 18 January 1988

Related
- The Kenny Everett Video Show

The Kenny Everett Television Show is a comedy sketch show broadcast on BBC1 from 24 December 1981 to 18 January 1988. It was presented by its main performer Kenny Everett, who wrote the material with Barry Cryer and Ray Cameron. Later in 1986 they were joined by writing team Andrew Marshall and David Renwick after Cameron's departure the previous year. It was similar in style to Everett's previous programme The Kenny Everett Video Show, broadcast on ITV from 1978 to 1981, but with greater emphasis on comedy sketches than musical numbers. However, each edition would still have at least one music act. A total 47 episodes, including 6 Christmas specials and 2 compilations over 5 series, were produced by the BBC, broadcast between 24 December 1981 and 18 January 1988 inclusive.

== Background ==
In 1981, Everett was increasingly unhappy with Thames Television over the management and scheduling of The Kenny Everett Video Show. One of his main complaints was that the show was scheduled at the same time as Top of the Pops on Thursday evenings, which took a hit on the ratings. Shortly after Series 4 had finished broadcasting, after some failed negotiations Everett decided not to renew his contract with Thames. That October he returned to the BBC, when he presented a weekly Saturday show on BBC Radio 2. The BBC were looking for a new prime sketch show, to fill the void since the loss of Morecambe and Wise to Thames three years earlier, and saw potential for doing a sketch show series with Everett. For his new BBC show, he brought over two of his writing collaborators who had worked with him on the Video Show, Barry Cryer and Ray Cameron, who had defected with him from Thames. They were joined by producer James Moir whose credits included The Generation Game and The Mike Yarwood Show, along with director Bill Wilson who had previously worked with Moir on the first two series of Not the Nine O'Clock News. Moir would ultimately produce only the first show; shortly after its recording, the Director General, Alistair Milne, promoted Moir to Head of Variety, leaving Wilson to take over producing responsibilities. Wilson who was unfamiliar with Everett's work at Thames wanted to go in a different direction to what had gone before. This show would have a larger budget, bigger guest stars, longer periods of filming and taping the show before a studio audience, in contrast to the comparatively low-budget production of the Thames series which was filmed at smaller studios and without an audience.

== Overview ==
The show's format was similar to his previous show with a mixture of comedy sketches and musical interludes; Everett had even brought over old characters like Marcel Wave, Angry of Mayfair, Brother Lee Love and Sid Snot from his previous show, despite accusations from Thames over the copyright of these characters. He also created new characters including Gizzard Puke, a philosophical punk who shares many similarities with his earlier character Sid Snot; Maurice Mimer, a mime artist whose drawings turn into real objects; Reg Prescott, an inept TV handyman whose DIY demonstrations often lead to horrific injuries; General Cheeseburger, a US Army General with oversized shoulders adorned with medals and hand grenades, whose monologues were seen as a satire on US foreign policy; Verity Treacle, an agony aunt who often receives requests by viewers to kill off celebrities in various elaborate ways; and Cupid Stunt, a vociferous B-movie actress, who is often seen giving interviews about her eventful career to a cardboard cut out of Michael Parkinson, where she rounds off each interview with the iconic catchphrase "It's all done in the best possible taste!" He also parodied popular shows at the time including Dallas and Dynasty which were merged to become 'Dallasty', a spoof of the Australian soap Neighbours called 'Cobbers', along with well-known fictional characters like Spider-Man, Beau Geste and Hinge & Bracket.

Everett's supporting cast included Cleo Rocos, Sheila Steafal, Lou Hirsch, Billy Connolly, John Arnatt and Willie Rushton, along with celebrity guest stars who sent themselves up, the likes of Frank Thornton, Brian Blessed, Lionel Blair, Burt Kwouk, Lulu, Tim Brooke-Taylor, Joanna Lumley, Lennie Bennett, Terry Wogan, Mel Smith and Vikki Michelle, who made frequent appearances on the show. As well as the main pool of writers involved in the show, other writers also submitted various sketches to the show, including Paul Alexander, Simon Booker, Neil Shand, Paul Minett and Dick Vosburgh, the last of whom had previously worked with Everett on his show at Thames. The show was a ratings success for the BBC, repeatedly drawing audiences of around 12-13 million viewers per episode. When the show was broadcast in early 1982, it was lauded by critics; Hilary Kingsley from the Daily Mirror commented "the first Kenny Everett show was tatty, tasteless and trivial. I loved it!" Everett was praised for his inventive comedy style that went against the norm for sketch shows; it was seen as zany, daring and unique, although at times the humour bordered on the grisly and squirm inducing. Towards the end of the show's run in 1987 the reception had changed, it was beginning to look tired and old-fashioned as James Green commented in a review for The Stage in December 1987, with its formula of bawdy and surreal humour barely changing over the years. After Series 5 ended in January 1988, Everett did not renew his contract with the BBC due to his growing disillusion with the filming of the show and faltering professional relations with his co-writers.

== Episodes ==
=== Christmas Special (1981) ===
No. overall	No. in Series	Title	Produced by	Directed by	Original airdate
1	1	"Merry Xmas"	James Moir	Bill Wilson	24 December 1981
Guest stars: David Frost, Bob Geldof, Billy Connolly, John Arnatt and Terry Wogan; Musical guests: The Police

=== Series 1 (1982) ===
No. overall	No. in Series	Title	Directed and Produced by	Original airdate
2	1	"Episode 1"	Bill Wilson	25 February 1982
Guest stars: Lionel Blair, Simon Cadell, John Junkin, John Arnatt, Billy Connolly, Willie Rushton, Sheila Steafel and Terry Wogan; Musical guest: Bill Wyman
3	2	"Episode 2"	Bill Wilson	4 March 1982
Guest stars: Toyah Willcox, Richard Johnson, Terry Wogan, Gary Martin, John Arnatt, Bill Wyman and Joanna Lumley; Musical guests: Toyah
4	3	"Episode 3"	Bill Wilson	11 March 1982
Guest stars: Lionel Blair, Willie Rushton, Sheila Steafel, John Arnatt, Billy Connolly, John Wells, Joanna Lumley and Richard Johnson; Musical guests: Madness
5	4	"Episode 4"	Bill Wilson	18 March 1982
Guest stars: Tim Brooke-Taylor, John Junkin, Frank Carson, Mike Moran, John Wells, Billy Connolly, Sheila Steafel, Joanna Lumley and Richard Johnson; Musical guest: Toni Basil
6	5	"Episode 5"	Bill Wilson	25 March 1982
Guest stars: Michael Parkinson, Willie Rushton, Gary Martin, John Arnatt and Terry Wogan; Musical guests: Imagination
7	6	"Episode 6"	Bill Wilson	1 April 1982
Guest stars: Lionel Blair, Frank Carson, Adam Faith, Gary Martin, John Arnatt, Sheila Steafel and Terry Wogan; Musical guest: B.A. Robertson
8	7	"Episode 7"	Bill Wilson	8 April 1982
Guest stars: Billy Connolly, Pamela Stephenson, Sheila Steafel, James Hunt, Lulu, Ian Lavender, Susan George and Michael Winner; Musical guests: Chas & Dave
9	8	"Episode 8"	Bill Wilson	15 April 1982
Guest stars: ABBA, Billy Connolly, Cannon & Ball, John Arnatt, Noel Edmonds, Judy Geeson, Susan George, Sheila Steafel and Bob Geldof; Musical guest: Lulu
10	9	"The Best of Series 1"	Bill Wilson	30 June 1982
Compilation episode.

=== Christmas Special (1982) ===
No. overall	No. in Series	Title	Directed and Produced by	Original airdate
11	1	"Just Another Show"	Bill Wilson	28 December 1982
Guest stars: Billy Connolly, Barry Cryer, Russell Harty, Lulu, Nicholas Lyndhurst, Geoffrey Palmer, Pamela Stephenson, Janet Street-Porter and Terry Wogan Musical guests: Ultravox

=== Series 2 (1983) ===
No. overall	No. in Series	Title	Directed and Produced by	Original airdate
12	1	"Episode 1"	Bill Wilson	24 February 1983
Guest stars: Burt Kwouk, Mel Smith, Ted Moult, Mike Moran, John Arnatt, Lou Hirsch, Sheila Steafel, Tony Osoba and Frank Williams; Musical guests: Modern Romance
13	2	"Episode 2"	Bill Wilson	3 March 1983
Guest stars: Jonathan Cecil, Billy Connolly, Burt Kwouk, Lou Hirsch, Mike Moran, Tony Osoba, Julian Lloyd-Webber, Geoffrey Palmer and Tic & Toc; Musical guests: Kajagoogoo
14	3	"Episode 3"	Bill Wilson	10 March 1983
Guest stars: John Bluthal, Mike Grady, Jack Haig, Willie Rushton, Mike Moran, Mel Smith and Eli Woods; Musical guests: U2
15	4	"Episode 4"	Bill Wilson	17 March 1983
Guest stars: Sabina Franklyn, Tim Barrett, Lou Hirsch, Eli Woods, John Bluthal, Robin Parkinson, P.G. Stephens, Burt Kwouk, Joanna Lumley, Jack Scott, Jacqueline Clarke, Sheila Steafel and Terry Wogan Musical guests: Duran Duran
16	5	"Episode 5"	Bill Wilson	24 March 1983
Guest stars: Martin Shaw, Mike Moran and Barry Cryer; Musical guests: Spandau Ballet
17	6	"Episode 6"	Bill Wilson	31 March 1983
Guest stars: Sheila Steafel, Roy Kinnear, Aimi MacDonald, Lou Hirsch, Mike Moran and Richard Todd; Musical guests: The Thompson Twins
18	7	"Episode 7"	Bill Wilson	7 April 1983
Guest stars: Lionel Blair, Lennie Bennett, Alfred Marks, Su Pollard and Frank Thornton; Musical guests: The Stranglers
19	8	"Episode 8"	Bill Wilson	14 April 1983
Guest stars: Alfred Marks, Daniel Peacock and Su Pollard; Musical guests: Chas & Dave

=== Specials (1983–1984) ===
No. overall	No. in Series	Title	Produced by	Directed by	Original airdate
20	1	"Christmas Show"	Bill Wilson	Bill Wilson	26 December 1983
Guest stars: Frank Thornton, Sheila Steafel, Willie Rushton, Lennie Bennett, Lionel Blair, Mike Moran, Billy Connolly and Fern Britton; Musical guests: The Police
21	2	"The Best of Series 2"	Bill Wilson	Bill Wilson	3 August 1984
Compilation episode.
22	3	"Christmas Show"	Bill Wilson	David Taylor	27 December 1984
Guest stars: Fiona Fullerton, Lennie Bennett, Bonnie Langford, Lulu, Patrick Mower, Willie Rushton and Bernie Winters; Musical guests: Culture Club

=== Series 3 (1985) ===
No. overall	No. in Series	Title	Directed and Produced by	Original airdate
23	1	"Episode 1"	John Bishop	13 April 1985
Guest stars: Jeffrey Holland, Sheila Steafel, John Wells and Bernie Winters; Musical guests: Tears For Fears
24	2	"Episode 2"	John Bishop	20 April 1985
Guest stars: Vicki Michelle, Lionel Blair, John Wells, Peter Woods, Jeffrey Wickham and Frank Thornton; Musical guests: The Flying Pickets
25	3	"Episode 3"	John Bishop	27 April 1985
Guest stars: Tim Brooke-Taylor, Jeffrey Holland, Sheila Steafel, Joanna Lumley and Lennie Bennett; Musical guests: Godley & Creme
26	4	"Episode 4"	John Bishop	11 May 1985
Guest stars: Lennie Bennett, Geoff Capes, Vicki Michelle, David Rappaport and Bernie Winters; Musical guests: Dead or Alive
27	5	"Episode 5"	John Bishop	18 May 1985
Guest stars: Bananarama, Sheila Steafel, Lionel Blair, John Arnatt and Willie Rushton; Musical guest: Toyah Wilcox
28	6	"Episode 6"	John Bishop	25 May 1985
Guest stars: Jeffrey Holland and Gareth Hunt; Musical guest: Howard Jones
29	7	"Episode 7"	John Bishop	1 June 1985
Guest stars: Fiona Fullerton, David Peacock, Willie Rushton and Sheila Steafel; Musical guest: David Cassidy
30	8	"Episode 8"	John Bishop	8 June 1985
Guest stars: Lennie Bennett, Kenny Lynch, Vicki Michelle and Willie Rushton; Musical guests: Big Daddy

=== Christmas Special (1985) ===
No. overall	No. in Series	Title	Directed and Produced by	Original airdate
31	1	"Kenny Everett's Christmas Carol"	James Bishop	24 December 1985
Guest stars: John Humphrys (The Newsreader), B.A. Robertson (Bob Cratchit), Rory Bremner (Bob Geldof), Spike Milligan (Jacob Marley), John Wells (The Ghost of Christmas Past), Anneka Rice (Pandora), Michael Barrymore (The Schoolmaster), Willie Rushton (The Ghost of Christmas Present), Francis Wilson (The Butler), Debbie Arnold (Mrs. Cratchit), Stuart Fell (The Rabbi), James Hunt (Footman), Tessa Sanderson (Footman) and Peter Cook (The Ghost of Christmas Yet to Come)

=== Series 4 (1986) ===
No. overall	No. in Series	Title	Produced by	Directed by	Original airdate
32	1	"Episode 1"	John Bishop	Kevin Bishop	16 October 1986
Guest stars: Tom Baker, Brian Blessed, Lou Hirsch, David Healy, George Layton, Edward Duke and Rory Bremner (as Barry Norman); Dance troupe: Hot Gossip
33	2	"Episode 2"	John Bishop	Kevin Bishop	23 October 1986
Guest stars: Lou Hirsch, Edward Duke, George Layton and Dennis Taylor; Dance troupe: Hot Gossip
34	3	"Episode 3"	John Bishop	Kevin Bishop	30 October 1986
Guest stars: Brian Blessed, Kenneth Colley, Joe Black, Edward Duke, Lou Hirsch and John Craven; Dance troupe: Hot Gossip
35	4	"Episode 4"	John Bishop	Kevin Bishop	6 November 1986
Guest stars: Joe Black, Brian Blessed, Mike Moran, Joanna Lumley, Tony Selby, Edward Duke and Lou Hirsch; Dance troupe: Hot Gossip
36	5	"Episode 5"	John Bishop	Kevin Bishop	13 November 1986
Guest stars: Brian Blessed, Joe Black, Rory Bremner, Edward Duke, Reginald Marsh, Lou Hirsch and Michael Stainton; Dance troupe: Hot Gossip
37	6	"Episode 6"	John Bishop	Kevin Bishop	20 November 1986
Guest stars: Lionel Blair, Joe Black, Edward Duke, Johnny More (as Fat Man), Irene Handl (as Arlene Phillips), George Layton, Lou Hirsch and Barry Took Dance troupe: Hot Gossip
38	7	"Episode 7"	John Bishop	Kevin Bishop	27 November 1986
Guest stars: John Arnatt, Brian Blessed, Rory Bremner (as Russell Harty), Edward Duke, Sarah Greene, Ted Moult (posthumous appearance), Lou Hirsch and Conrad Phillips; Dance troupe: Hot Gossip
39	8	"Episode 8"	John Bishop	Kevin Bishop	4 December 1986
Guest stars: Joe Black, Percy Edwards, Edward Duke, Lou Hirsch and George Layton; Dance troupe: Hot Gossip

=== Christmas Special (1986) ===
No. overall	No. in Series	Title	Directed and Produced by	Original airdate
40	1	"Kenny's Christmas Cracker"	John Bishop	24 December 1986
Guest stars: Ben Aris, Ed Bishop, Lionel Blake, Jilli Foot, Simon Bowman, Ross Davidson, Howard Lew Lewis and Gareth Marks; Musical guests: Spandau Ballet

=== Series 5 (1987–1988) ===
No. overall	No. in Series	Title	Produced by	Directed by	Original airdate
41	1	"Episode 1"	Paul Ciani	Kevin Bishop	30 November 1987
Guest stars: Lionel Blair and Gary Martin; Musical guest: Elton John
42	2	"Episode 2"	Paul Ciani	Kevin Bishop	7 December 1987
Guest stars: Lionel Blair, Gerald Campion, Gary Martin and John Dunn; Musical guest: Kim Wilde
43	3	"Episode 3"	Paul Ciani	Kevin Bishop	14 December 1987
Guest stars: Harry Fowler, Lionel Blair, Gary Martin and Christopher Timothy; Musical guest: Donny Osmond
45	4	"Episode 4"	Paul Ciani	Kevin Bishop	4 January 1988
Guest stars: Ian McCaskill, Roy North, Gary Martin, Lionel Blair and Gerald Campion; Musical guest: Chris Rea
46	5	"Episode 5"	Paul Ciani	Kevin Bishop	11 January 1988
Guest stars: Tim Brooke-Taylor, Lionel Blair, Sheila Steafel, Gary Martin and Frank Thornton; Musical guests: Marillion
47	6	"Episode 6"	Paul Ciani	Kevin Bishop	18 January 1988
Guest stars: Lionel Blair, Gary Martin and Christopher Timothy; Musical guest: Errol Brown

== Syndication ==
Since the show was last broadcast in January 1988, no complete episodes from this show have ever been repeated on the BBC, but the show was often repeated in its entirety on UK Gold during the 1990s, and more recently on Paramount Comedy starting from the 4 February 2008. A few months after Everett's death in April 1995, the BBC broadcast two compilation episodes titled The Best of the Kenny Everett Shows over two consecutive weeks on BBC1 between 19 and 25 September 1995. A few years later on 1 March 1999, the BBC released a compilation of his shows on DVD and VHS, titled Kenny Everett: In the Best Possible Taste.
