= Captain Kremmen =

British radio serial

Captain Kremmen was a British science fiction comedy radio serial set in the early 21st century. (The pilot opens in 2005.) It was written and performed for Capital Radio by the DJ Kenny Everett, beginning in 1976. It was also broadcast on Liverpool's Radio City and Nottingham's Radio Trent in the early 1980s. It featured the eponymous vain and dimwitted spaceship captain. Everett took the name Kremmen from a series of American radio comedy discs called "Superfun" produced by Mel Blanc and his son, Noel. One of the regulars in the series was voice actor Bob Arbogast, and he came up with Kremmen, as a fictitious brand name for spoof commercials. These were heard by Everett in his Radio London days, and he revived the name for his space captain, and used some of the Superfun spoof ads in the Kremmen series. Each episode began with an introduction by Patrick Allen.

The premise was subsequently adapted for television and other media.

== Main characters ==
Captain Elvis Brandenburg Kremmen - Born in Liverpool on Christmas Day in 1950, Kremmen grew up with an interest in becoming an astronaut like his idol, Dan Dare. In the animated version, he bears a striking resemblance to Kenny Everett, who was also born in Liverpool on Christmas Day (but in 1944).

Graduating from the Space Academy, Kremmen went on to become the world's most fabulous man, as well as a captain for Star Corps. He also has bionic veins, and a bionic left foot with a detachable big toe that converts into a space cannon. According to a 'computer read-out' at the beginning of the episodes, he has an IQ of 498 and a height of 6 ft 10 in (2.08 m), and is a supreme athlete, a concert pianist, concorde pilot, mountain climber, diplomat, space captain & genius. Another variation on the opening script said he had 'muscles in places where most other people don't even have places'.

Carla - Born in New York on 27 July 1950, Carla was an American and the world's most voluptuous woman. She came from a poor family, and used her beauty to get a job in Star Corps. Whenever alone with Kremmen, she persuades him to have casual sex with her. Her first visual appearance saw her looking like Marilyn Monroe, but this was changed in the TV series where she became a black woman with peroxide blonde hair. In the live-action sketch version, the character was played by Anna Dawson, who was also born on 27 July, but in Bolton in 1937.

Dr. Heinrich von Gitfinger - Kremmen's scientific aide from Germany. His name changes between media: in the graphic novel his surname was "Grelbman" and his first name in the newspaper comic strips was "Schweinhund" (literally "pig-dog" - a German insult). Gitfinger is extremely short (barely half the height of Carla and Kremmen) and wears a white lab coat. He also has glasses, in which fruit machine symbols sometimes appear. In some areas, he is portrayed as a Nazi. He is married and has children living in West Germany.

Other minor characters include Gonad, Schmuckstein, Threllmer and Fooman, who are all technicians aboard the Troll-1 – Kremmen's spaceship, which is more than a little reminiscent of a portable cassette recorder.

== Foes ==
The Thargoids - Based on their synthetic homeworld of Thargoidia, the Thargoids are a race of beings led by Gort (a parody of a movie character with the same name), who drain all other beings of their knowledge so that they will be the most intelligent beings in the universe. They are described as having transparent heads, furry green eyeballs, seven legs and three lips. This latter feature is the reason the Thargoids drink tea; as Gort explained: "You try asking for llllager and llllime with llllips llllike these!"

The Krells - Originally nine-headed creatures with enormous lips, the Krells later became slimy lumps in the TV series. They are the second alien race to appear in the series after the Thargoids. Their first leader was Queen Iris, followed by King Zarno during their "lump" stages in the radio and TV series. The "nine-heads" appeared only in the book, and were led by Zorro, who was more welcoming to Kremmen than the other leaders. Their final appearance was in a war against the Macronites, who were planning revenge for an earlier Krell attack. They seem to be named after the alien civilisation mentioned in Forbidden Planet.

The Sun-Suckers - A nearby sun died out years ago, and a race of beings called the Sun-Suckers began to die from the intense cold. By stealing solar energy from the Earth's sun, the Sun-Suckers were able to stay alive for a little longer. Their number was 1,000 when Kremmen arrived, and their leader was known as Vardak the Elder. The Sun-Suckers are lumps like the Krells, but have four ears according to Kremmen.

== Further appearances ==
In 1977, a comic book was released by Corgi, explaining Kremmen's time before he became a space hero. In his earlier years, Kremmen was more of an anti-hero, offering to allow the Krells to destroy Birmingham instead of his hometown of Liverpool. The story was quite surreal, and portrayed Kremmen as a womaniser as well as a control freak. The Krells planned to dump poisonous Thronn over Liverpool to destroy it, but the Thronn quickly turns into jelly when it reacts with grease from various fish-and-chip shops en route. The comic also introduced several new characters, with some politically incorrect ones, such as the Jewish Moyshe Pukestein, and the Jamaican nightnurse, Dr. Winston. There was also a one-sided 7 inch flexi-disc to promote the book titled "Captain Kremmen & The Krells".

The single "Captain Kremmen (Retribution)" was a UK chart hit for Kenny Everett and Mike Vickers, peaking at No.32 in late November 1977. Its main lyric, "Tread boldly, men", was a skit on Star Trek's opening monologue.

A Captain Kremmen daily comic strip began in the Evening Standard in June 1978.

The series became an animated cartoon in The Kenny Everett Video Show in July 1978.This was produced for the series by Cosgrove Hall Films. The characters were designed and animated by Graham Kennedy. The characters of Kremmen and Carla also appeared in live-action sketches in the final series.

In 1979, a View-Master three-reel blister card was produced titled "Kenny Everett's Captain Kremmen". The View-Master company was well known for creating products aimed at children during the years the Captain Kremmen set was produced. The cover art features the three main characters with the Carla character drawn with erect nipples, a rare sexual image for a View-Master product.

In autumn 1979 "Kenny Everett's Video Show Annual 1980" was published (64 page, large format hardback), featuring Captain Kremmen, Carla and Gitfinger on the cover.

In the summer of 1980, a 25-minute film entitled Kremmen: The Movie was released. Like the comic book, it was unusual. As well as several new characters, the only original characters were Kremmen, Carla and Gitfinger. The plot itself centered on Kremmen finding a giant space-monster that was eating planets. When his new spaceship is eaten by the monster, Kremmen is able to help the ship escape by pumping oxygen into the stomach and making the monster vomit, but the creature itself isn't destroyed, and it is not made clear if the other planets that were eaten were rescued. A soundtrack album was released (on LP and cassette) by EMI to accompany the movie. Also a 7-inch single was released to promote the album, with music credited to "The Aliens".

In autumn 1980 "Kenny Everett's Video Show Annual 1981" was published (64 page, large format hardback), featuring Captain Kremmen, Carla and Gitfinger on the cover.

In December 1980, an album (on LP and cassette) was issued in the UK. Australia and New Zealand, by CBS Records: "The Greatest Adventure Yet From Captain Kremmen".
