= Cerrone =

French musician (born 1952)

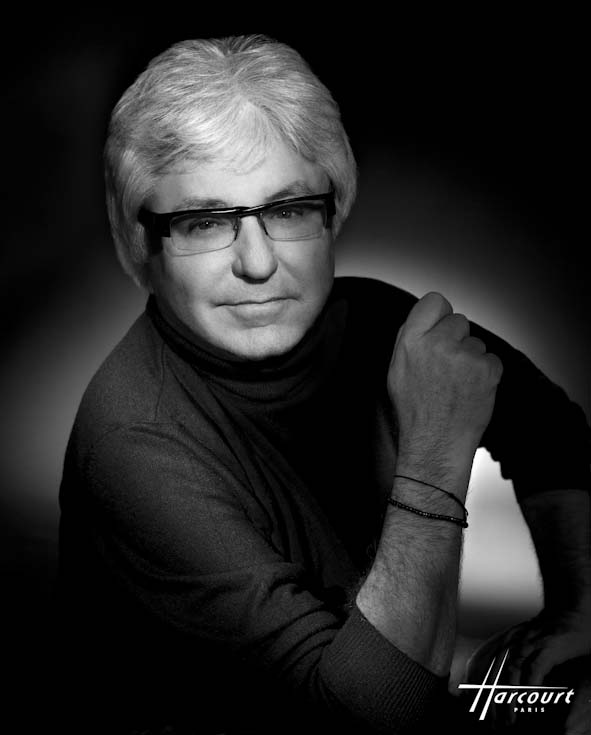
- Cerrone in 2011

Background information
- Born: Marc Cerrone; 24 May 1952 (age 74); Vitry-sur-Seine, France
- Genres: Euro disco, post-disco, funk, electronic, French house
- Occupations: Musician, producer, songwriter, DJ, composer, conductor
- Instruments: Drums, keyboards, synthesiser
- Years active: 1972–present
- Label: Malligator Productions
- Website: cerrone.net

Marc Cerrone (French pronunciation: [maʁk sɛʁɔn]; born 24 May 1952), known mononymously as Cerrone, is a French disco drummer, composer, conductor, DJ, record producer and creator of concerts. Cerrone is a producer of 1970s and 1980s disco songs. He has sold over 30 million albums worldwide, including over four million copies in France, and eight million copies of Supernature. The single "Love in C Minor" (1976) reached No. 3 and was in the charts for two months, selling three million copies. With "Supernature" (1977), Cerrone merged symphonic orchestration with synthesisers. At the 1978 Billboard Disco Forum, Cerrone received six awards, including Disco Artist of the Year.

In addition to Love in C Minor, Cerrone's Paradise and Supernature, Marc Cerrone enjoyed success in Europe with albums such as Cerrone IV: The Golden Touch (1978), Where Are You Now (1983), The Collector (1985), Human Nature (1994) and more recently with the dance albums Hysteria (2002) and Celebrate (2007). Cerrone is also known for live performances. In 1991, he played on the show Harmony to celebrate the launch of Japan's first high-definition TV satellite. The rock opera was played to over 800,000 spectators at Tokyo harbour. Cerrone adapted "Harmony" for the theatre. In 1992, the musical Dreamtime, which was based on an original story by Cerrone, ran for 140 shows on Broadway at New York's Ed Sullivan Theater.

Cerrone has recorded and performed with artists such as Nile Rodgers, Toto, Laura Branigan, Jocelyn Brown, La Toya Jackson and Axelle Red. His music has been sampled by the Avalanches, Bob Sinclar, the Beastie Boys and Run-DMC.

== Career ==
Cerrone was born in Vitry-sur-Seine to the son of Italian immigrants. At the age of 12, he started playing drums and listening to Otis Redding songs. Cerrone's passion for music was discouraged by his father, who tried to distract him from his obsession. By the end of the 1960s, he was fascinated by Jimi Hendrix, Carlos Santana and Blood, Sweat & Tears, among others. At the age of 17, he convinced Gilbert Trigano to hire rock bands for his all-inclusive holiday-hotel operator Club Med. Cerrone became its worldwide A&R scout, responsible for the musical entertainment at Club Med's 40 vacation villages.

=== Kongas ===
His first recordings as a part of Kongas were released on Barclay Records, where he issued his first hit single, "Boom", and the 1974 album Afro-Rock. He is most famous from the Kongas days for "Anikana-O", co-written and produced by Alec R. Costandinos. A remix was done by Tom Moulton for the US release on Salsoul Records. This mix was also used on other international releases.

=== Love in C Minor ===
Based in Paris, Cerrone recorded and performed his solo debut Love in C Minor, written by Costandinos. Released on his own Malligator imprint and distributed by Warner Filipacchi in France, it immediately shocked audiences with its controversial cover. Copies of the LP were sent to the US, apparently in error, but it was heard by New York DJs who began playing it. Atlantic Records signed Cerrone to a contract, and the musician relocated to the U.S. The album was later released with a new, tamer cover that took the nude women off and replaced them with four arms clenched and a black background instead for the American release. As well as "Love in C Minor", it also featured a cover version of Los Bravos's "Black Is Black" and "Midnite Lady", an instrumental piece. Cotillion Records released the album through Warner distribution in the U.S. The album was released unedited in Canada, using the original master tapes. This was the final collaboration between Cerrone and the Egyptian-born Costandinos, who went on to create dancefloor hits such as "I've Found Love" by Love & Kisses, and the disco opera re-telling of the story of "Romeo and Juliet".

Reviewing Cerrone in Christgau's Record Guide: Rock Albums of the Seventies (1981), Robert Christgau gave it a B-plus and wrote, "Catchy tracks, a remake of 'Black Is Black,' and a new standard in disco porn—the protagonist brings three women to simultaneous orgasm while keeping one finger on the 'Door Close' button."

== Recording ==
Love in C Minor was recorded at Trident Studios, London, during sessions in September and October 1976.

The album’s liner notes include acknowledgements to studio personnel and associates, thanking Sarah, Sue, Peter Booth, Bernie "Clic" Spratt, Ray Staff, Brainiac, Psycho, Gunpowder Green, Don Ray, R. Costandinos, and Daniel Galfo.

=== Cerrone's Paradise ===
Cerrone continued using pieces of photographic and audio erotica when he released his second album, Cerrone's Paradise. It was recorded with Alain Wisniak co-writing and arranged by Raymond Donnez, also known as "Don Ray", as part of his arrangement entourage after parting company with Costandinos. The original French album cover featured a naked model draped over the top of a fridge with a jar of white powder spilt in front of it. The U.S. Atlantic/Cotillion release featured a photo of Cerrone wearing a Hawaiian shirt.

=== Supernature ===
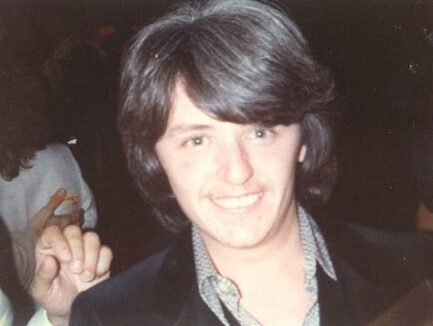
Cerrone in 1977

His third album, Supernature, sold over eight million albums worldwide. A departure from the lush orchestration with electronic instrumentation added to the mix, it was co-written by Alain Wisniak. The lyrics to "Supernature", written by Lene Lovich, have a sci-fi theme: it concerns the rebellion of mutant creatures—created by scientists to end starvation among mankind—against the humans. The album also featured "Sweet Drums", a three-minute-and-ten-second drum breakdown. The original French album cover was again different, having a gatefold opening with nudes in the centre. The music itself was the same.

"Supernature" was used as the theme music to Thames TV's The Kenny Everett Video Show (as well as being danced to by Hot Gossip in the same show), which was shown across the United Kingdom. More recently, on 26 July 2024, the 2024 Summer Olympics opening ceremony used the theme Supernature as one of the main songs played with an outstanding spectacle of lights coming from the Eiffel Tower and performed by a sign language artist.

=== The Golden Touch ===
After the success of Supernature, Cerrone IV: The Golden Touch, Cerrone signed up for management with Steven and Martin Machat. They helped oversee his worldwide career. Steven Machat negotiated a new deal for Cerrone in the US and Canada with Atlantic and CBS outside the US, Canada, as well as France.

These were major artists' deals for that time period. The album got great reviews in the US, and Atlantic threw a party in New York City, October 1978 that was one of the largest parties ever thrown for an artist up to that point in time. The album was another Cerrone U.S. disco chart-topper. Driven by "Je Suis Music", "Look for Love", and the urban-slanted "Rocket in the Pocket" which featured Jimmy Page on guitar, this album showed his fusion attributes, foreshadowing his future releases.

Cerrone then ventured into movie scoring, supplying the music score for Brigade Mondaine, a French film. Alternate mixes of his hits were made, such as "Give Me Love", "Phonic" (originally released as a 12-inch single on the Crocos label), and "Striptease". The latter was an underground hit, introduced to international audiences through the Disconet subscription service for DJs. It was a key inclusion on "Cerrone by Bob Sinclar".

=== Cerrone V–XIII ===
Cerrone V marked a radical departure for the artist, where he made a full-fledged attempt to become the vocalist. Moving from Cotillion to Atlantic Records in the U.S., "Rock Me" was the first single and, although clubs reacted fairly well, it did not reach the heights of his previous releases. Sonically, it bears a resemblance to "Hot Stuff" by Donna Summer. Recorded in Los Angeles with the musicians backing Toto, Cerrone co-wrote "Call Me Tonight" with producer Bob Esty and vocalist/lyricist Michelle Aller.

His sixth album, Cerrone VI, was the first of his albums not to be released in the U.S. and was issued on Malligator and Unidisc in Canada. Unlike his previous albums, this non-rhythmic offering, using new electronic elements such as the Fairlight CMI computer, was more of Cerrone exploring the entire musical landscape. Lyricist Pamela Forrest, a Liverpool-born, Paris-based lyricist, added her magic to the album. The instrumental, Herb Alpert-inspired "Rendezvous" received scattered Adult Contemporary airplay in Canada. Cerrone also returned to the erotic album covers, using an existing Cheyco Leidmann photograph of a bare-breasted blonde in a lawnchair, and inserting himself in the photograph.

In a true return to form, "You Are the One" was the cornerstone of his seventh record. An 11-minute version of "Cherry Tree" remains on the shelf. This album was rumoured to have been recorded twice: first with Stoke-on-Trent, England, native Kay Garner, long the voice of Cerrone's biggest successes; and then with Brown. The version with Garner on the lead vocals has never been released.

As a bridge between Cerrone's seventh and eighth albums, a 12-inch single, "Tripping on the Moon", was released before and was a blockbuster import hit. Sung by Kay Garner and vocally reminiscent in tone of "Supernature", it was never released in North America as a single. It later became a part of Cerrone VIII: Back Track. It was released on John Luongo's Portrait label, distributed by CBS. Although the title track was a mild chart hit in the nightclub, the album's lone bright spot was a re-recording of "Supernature" sung by Montreal-based Nanette Workman. Workman had a 1973 hit with the song "The Queen" on Big Tree Records. A short time thereafter, Canadian-born singer Claudja Barry did a cover version of "Trippin'", released on Personal Records.

=== 1980s–1990s ===
His ninth album, Your Love Survived, featured male lead vocals other than his own, sung by Arthur Simms. Simms, along with his brother John, had also recorded an album entitled John & Arthur Simms with Alec R. Costandinos on his Ibis/Casablanca imprint. Pamela Forrest also rejoined the cast, writing lyrics on the album. Re-recordings of hits such as "Give Me Love", "Look for Love", and "Call Me Tonight" were also featured on this double LP set. Key tracks included "Get Your Lovin'" and "Workout".

Another return to form was his tenth album, Where Are You Now?. Sung by American Carole Rowley and released on Malligator in France, Hi-NRG producer and mixer Ian Levine was tabbed to do the mix, prompting a 12-inch release on the Record Shack label. In 1984, "Club Underworld" was also released as a single, in both France and the United States on Personal Records, with a new mix.

Perhaps the most interesting Cerrone record that was never to be on a full-length album was his interpretation of "Standing in the Shadows of Love" intertwined with his own composition "Freak Connection". It was released only in France.

Cerrone's boutique label, Crocos, was the home to a number of independently produced projects. "Africanism" by Kongas, arranged by Don Ray, was an energetic fusion of tribal drum beats and emotive male vocals framed around a cover version of "Gimme Some Lovin'" by Traffic. It was licensed for North American distribution in a deal between Cerrone and Polydor U.S.

Don Ray's 1978 album Garden of Love, written with Cerrone, included hits such as "Got to Have Lovin'", "Body & Soul", and "Standing in the Rain" guided the album to No. 1 Stateside. Lene Lovich wrote the lyrics.

Revelacion, a studio act, released two albums: a side-long version of "House of the Rising Sun" on Crocos (which was also released at almost the same time as Santa Esmeralda's second album) and "Don't Give A Damn", a 16-minute electronic-spiced, downtempo track recalling "Music of Life" on Malligator.

He also produced the singles "Tonight the Night" for percussionist Mo Foster and "Phonic" by Cristal, the latter of which echoes the synth boom that was started by Space's "Magic Fly". A song featuring La Toya Jackson was also issued, entitled "Oops, Oh No".

In 1992, Cerrone's show Dreamtime ran on Broadway at the Ed Sullivan Theater. In 1995 the Dream CD, with music from the Broadway musical Dreamtime, was released by Malligator, a division of Unidisc Music Inc.

=== 21st century ===
In 2000, Bob Sinclar worked with Cerrone for his disco album Cerrone by Bob Sinclar, which was released the following year.

In 2002, he released the album Hysteria. The song "Hysteria" was the only single from the album. In February 2005, he signed the score of the French adaptation of A Clockwork Orange given in the Cirque d'Hiver in Paris.

By 2007, he issued the song "Laisser Toucher". It is the lead single from his album Celebrate!, released in early 2008. The second single from the album was "Misunderstanding".

Cerrone issued his twentieth album release, Love Ritual, on 7 July 2008. The lead single is the title track, which preceded the full-length album. "Love Ritual" also has a supporting music video. It was quickly followed by the next two singles, "It Had to Be You" and "Tattoo Woman". The single, "Tattoo Woman", with remixes by Jamie Lewis, was made available domestically in the U.S. on traxsource.com.

By 2009, Joey Negro released a remix of Cerrone's "Paradise". In the same year, Cerrone was one of the members of the jury of the television program X Factor in France on W9 and in Belgium on RTL-TVI.

On 12 March 2009, Cerrone released the album Cerrone by Jamie Lewis for free on his website. He stated that "music is condemned to be free and that it is necessary to find other solutions to make revenues".

Cerrone Symphony, Variations of Supernature was released in February 2010 with the first single: "Supernature Project" featuring Dax Riders. "Supernature Symphony" took place in Paris-La-Défense on 2 October 2010, in the evening of "Nuit Blanche". It was the first date of his tour, which included Los Angeles, London, Rome, Dubai and Moscow. In September 2016 he released the single "Move Me" featuring Brendan Reilly as a precursor to the forthcoming album Red Lips. Three tracks on the album were produced by the French funk musician Dabeull, one of them with Aloe Blacc.

It was followed by a remix EP of the same song in January 2017, released through Big Beat Atlantic Records.

== Select performances ==
He performed in large concerts and events such as the 2005 Dance Party Live in Versailles and the 2000 Los Angeles Millennium Célébration, where, at the request of the Mayor of Los Angeles, Cerrone staged the beginnings of the Hollywood cinema era. In 1989, he performed in the concert at Paris's Place de la Concorde for the celebration of the bicentenary of the French Revolution.

In 1991, he performed a concert event in Tokyo for the launch of the first HD satellite TV channel in Japan.

- In November 1988, he organized a production of the rock opera The Collector on the square of Trocadéro (the site of the Palais de Chaillot) at the request of Jack Lang, then the French Minister of Culture, and the City Hall of Paris.
- On 14 July 1989, he participated in the celebrations of the Bicentenary of the French Revolution on the banks of the Seine.
- In 1991, Cerrone performed the concert show "Harmony", which took place in the Port of Tokyo during the evening for the launch of the first Japanese high-definition television channel.
- On 12 July 1996, he produced a show of sounds and lights for peace, with the support of the 14th Dalai Lama Tenzin Gyatso, settled off the Promenade des Anglais in Nice.
- He played at the Los Angeles Millennium Celebration, which was held to mark the passage into the year 2000.
- On 1 July 2005, he organised a free concert at the Palace of Versailles, claiming it was "the biggest discotheque in the world" which was followed the next day by the concert Live 8.
- In 2008, with his old accomplice Nile Rodgers, he organized the "NY Dance Party" in the middle of Central Park, in New York, recreation of a huge discothèque to celebrate thirty years of dance music (the event was originally planned for 6 October 2007 and had to be held in Times Square, between 42nd and 49th Street).
- Cerrone performed at the Opening Ceremony for the 2024 Summer Olympics.
- Starting in November 2025, Cerrone opened several dates for the British band Jamiroquai's Heels of Steel tour.

== Discography ==
Studio albums

- Anikana-O (1974)
- Love in C Minor (1976)
- Cerrone's Paradise (1977)
- Supernature (Cerrone 3) (1977)
- Africanism (1978)
- The Golden Touch (Cerrone IV) (1978)
- Angelina (Cerrone V) (1979)
- Panic (Cerrone VI) (1980)
- You Are the One (Cerrone VII) (1980)
- Back Track (Cerrone VIII) (1982)
- Your Love Survived (Cerrone IX) (1982)
- Where Are You Now (1983)
- The Collector (1985)
- Way In (1989)
- Dream (1992)
- X-Xex (1993)
- Human Nature (1994)
- Hysteria (2002)
- Celebrate ! (2007)
- Cerrone Symphony – Variations of Supernature (2010)
- Red Lips (2016)
- DNA (2020)

== Honours ==
- Knight of the Legion of Honour (2019)
- Officer of the Ordre des Arts et des Lettres (2025)

== See also ==
- List of Billboard number-one dance club songs
- List of artists who reached number one on the U.S. Dance Club Songs chart
