= Kenny Everett =

English radio DJ and comedian (1944–1995)

- Born: Maurice James Christopher Cole; 25 December 1944; Seaforth, Lancashire, England
- Died: 4 April 1995 (aged 50); London, England
- Notable work: See below
- Spouse: Lee Middleton (m. 1969; div. 1984)

Comedy career
- Years active: 1962–1994
- Medium: Radio; television
- Genres: Character comedy; surreal comedy; sketch

Signature
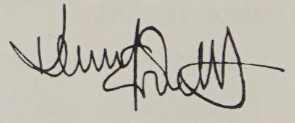

Kenny Everett (born Maurice James Christopher Cole; 25 December 1944 – 4 April 1995) was an English radio DJ and television comedian, known for his zany comedic style.

After spells working on pirate radio and Radio Luxembourg in the mid-1960s, Everett was one of the first DJs to join newly created BBC Radio 1 in 1967, where he developed the comedic voices and characters which he later adapted for television. He was dismissed from the BBC in 1970 after making a flippant comment on air after a news item concerning a government minister's wife. He was later reinstated at the BBC, working both on local and national radio. In 1973, when commercial radio became licensed in the UK, he joined Capital Radio.

In the late 1970s, moving to television, he made numerous comedy series, notably The Kenny Everett Video Show on ITV from 1978 to 1981, and The Kenny Everett Television Show on the BBC from 1981 to 1988, often appearing with Cleo Rocos, whose glamour and curvaceous figure were often used to comic effect. He was a highly versatile performer, able to write his own scripts and compose jingles in addition to operating advanced recording and mixing equipment. His personality made him a regular guest on chat shows and game shows such as Blankety Blank. In 2006, the British public ranked him number 45 in ITV's poll of TV's 50 Greatest Stars.

Everett supported the Conservative Party under Margaret Thatcher and made a public appearance at the Young Conservatives conference in 1983. As a gay man, he was criticised for supporting a Conservative government which enacted Section 28, a clause of the Local Government Act which made it illegal for councils to promote gay rights. He was diagnosed with HIV in 1989, developed AIDS in 1993, and died in 1995.

== Early life and education ==
Maurice James Christopher Cole was born on Christmas Day 1944 at 14 Hereford Road in Seaforth.

His family was Roman Catholic and he attended St Bede's, the local secondary modern school, in Crosby (now part of Sacred Heart Catholic College). He later attended a junior seminary at Stillington, North Yorkshire, with an Italian missionary order, the Verona Fathers, where he was a choirboy.

== Radio ==
=== Radio London, Radio Luxembourg and BBC Radio 1 ===
During 1963 he sent copies of his short, home-produced radio shows to Tape Recording Magazine, and they suggested sending a tape to the BBC. "The Maurice Cole Quarter of an Hour Show" led to an appearance, in May 1964, as a guest on the BBC Home Service show "Midweek", and a few weeks later to an audition at Broadcasting House. Nerves got the better of him, and it didn't lead to a job offer, but they suggested he send a tape to the producers looking for presenters for the soon to be launched pirate station Radio London. Everett then began his broadcasting career, on 25 December 1964 (his 20th birthday), as a DJ for Radio London. Before taking to the airwaves, he was advised to change his name to avoid legal problems. He adopted the name "Everett" from a childhood hero, the American comic actor Edward Everett Horton.

Everett and Dave Cash teamed for the Kenny & Cash Show, one of the most popular pirate radio programmes. His offbeat style and likeable personality quickly gained him attention, but in November 1965 he was dismissed after some outspoken remarks about religion on air. Like most of the pirate stations, Radio London carried sponsored American evangelical shows and Everett's disparaging remarks about The World Tomorrow caused its producers to threaten to withdraw their lucrative contract with the station. After a spell at Radio Luxembourg, and another dismissal, Everett returned to Radio London in June 1966. He accompanied The Beatles on their August 1966 tour of the United States, sending back daily reports for Radio London.

Johnny Beerling, a BBC producer, secretly visited Radio London in February 1967, and observed Everett at work: "I saw this man Everett doing everything. In the old way of doing things, the DJ sat in one room with a script. Someone else played the records and somebody else controlled the sound. Yet I see this man who has control of everything." An audition tape submitted to the BBC was assessed in March 1967 by a panel:

Member one: 'A pseudo-American voice. Sounds experienced and seems to fancy his luck. Yes.'
Member two: 'By far the most original of the young DJs. I found the stilted bits in bad taste but with suitable restraint and encouragement, Kenny Everett could be one of the BBC's best DJs. Yes.'
Member three: 'Without the hard sell and the occasional phoney American accent, a good pop DJ. Must be made to curb the funnies and the voices. Yes.'
Member four: 'I found the continuous changes of voices irritating and his personality supercilious but he certainly has some talent. Should be available but would need very firm production. Yes.'

Everett was heard in May 1967 on the BBC's soon to be discontinued BBC Light Programme previewing the Beatles' forthcoming album Sgt. Pepper's Lonely Hearts Club Band. He later produced their 1968 and 1969 Christmas records.

Everett was one of the DJs on the new pop music station Radio 1 from its launch at the end of September 1967. While at Radio 1, he continued to develop his distinctive presentation style, encouraged by producer Angela Bond, who had persuaded her superiors to give him his first programme, although he later reacted against her as a representative of the BBC. Everett's Radio 1 show featured zany voices, comical characters, multi-tracked jingles and trailers, all of his own creation and compilation. It was Everett who had persuaded Johnny Beerling and station controller Robin Scott, at a lunch meeting before his appointment, of the importance of the new station having jingles. Everett's shows on Radio 1 included Midday Spin and in late 1967 he took over his own show on Sunday mornings from 10 am to noon.

In July 1968, Everett briefly took over a daily show for Radio 1, entitled Foreverett. This went out from 6.45 to 7.30 pm on a Monday to Friday evening. At the time, this was becoming a gruelling schedule for Everett, so in early 1969 he took over a Saturday show from 10 am to noon.

In 1970, Everett again found himself dismissed, this time after suggesting on air that Mary Peyton, the British Transport Minister's wife, had bribed her driving test examiner. The remark was a spontaneous quip, following a news item describing how Peyton had finally passed after many attempts. The BBC thought the comment "indefensible", although shortly before the incident Everett had given a controversial interview with Melody Maker contrary to a BBC embargo preventing him from giving interviews. In negotiations with the record companies and the Musicians' Union over needle time, a limit on the playing on-air of commercially recorded music, the MU representatives would complain about Everett, the one BBC broadcaster who persistently mocked them. In the year after Everett's death, it was stated that the bribery quip was merely an excuse and that the real reason was because he threatened to go public on the restrictive practices and deals with the Musicians' Union that were not only frustrating him and his listeners, but also making Radio One much less popular than the pirate stations it had been set up to displace.

Following an interview on the BBC Radio Solent children's show Albert's Gang, Everett submitted weekly shows to the station that he had pre-recorded at home. This afforded the BBC the opportunity to vet the shows before broadcast. Everett was then heard on various BBC local radio stations before being reinstated at Radio 1 in April 1973. Here he recorded a weekly show from his home in Llandovery, Wales and it went out at 1:00 on a Sunday afternoon.

=== Capital Radio ===
During this time, legislation had been passed allowing the licensing of commercial radio stations in the UK. One of the first, Capital Radio, began broadcasting to London and the home counties in October 1973. Everett joined the station and was given a weekend (recorded) show, where he further developed his distinctive ideas. From January 1974, following poor audience figures which in turn followed a difficult start for Capital during a time of industrial strife, the station changed to a more pop-based, rather than light music, format, with Everett presenting the breakfast show with his former colleague and friend from the pirate station Radio London (Big L) days, Dave Cash, and so reactivating the "Kenny and Cash" show. When Cash moved to the lunchtime slot in 1975, Everett continued alone on the breakfast show. Everett had a great love of sound recording equipment, in particular using reel-to-reel tape recorders and mixing equipment, often adding sound-on-sound to his recordings and stereo/multi-track recordings of his pseudo-singing voice. These were broadcast on air regularly and he often created his own radio jingles. Everett created many comedy characters on The Breakfast Show with Cash on Capital.

In May 1975, Everett found early mornings too much for his lifestyle and he vacated the breakfast show to Graham Dene and moved to less high-pressure weekend timeslots at Capital on Saturday and Sunday lunchtimes. Here he further developed his style, and featured both what he thought the best in music (Queen, Chris Rainbow) and the worst, which led to the popular Kenny Everett's World's Worst Record Show programmes, later released as an album in 1978, with slightly different tracks.

In 1975, Everett played a pivotal role in getting Queen's "Bohemian Rhapsody" released as a single. In 1976, he also presented a pre-recorded programme on Saturday lunch-time for Radio Victory in Portsmouth, later providing Captain Kremmen to the station for transmission in Dave Christian's late show. The series was also heard on Beacon Radio in the Midlands.

=== BBC Radio and back to Capital ===
On 5 February 1980, Everett made his only appearance on the BBC Radio 4 show Just a Minute, where he spoke on the subject of marbles for 90 seconds. The extended improvisation was imposed by Nicholas Parsons as a practical joke.

In October 1981, Everett returned to BBC Radio, this time on Radio 2, on Saturdays from 11:00 a.m. to 1:00 pm. The show ended in December 1983, a couple of weeks after he made a risqué on-air joke about Margaret Thatcher

Everett returned to Capital Radio in June 1984, reviving his Saturday lunchtime show. In May 1985, he was called in to replace Graeme Garden for one episode of the Radio 4 game show I'm Sorry I Haven't a Clue. After Capital split its frequencies in 1988, he returned to daily broadcasting on Capital Gold, as part of a strong presenting line-up including Tony Blackburn and David Hamilton. Everett presented daytime shows on weekdays until 1994, when his health deteriorated to the point he was unable to continue. During that same year, he was awarded the Special Gold Award at Sony's Radio Academy Awards for his contribution to radio.

=== Timeline ===
- Kenny & Cash Show, Radio London, 1964–65
- Kenny Everett Audio Show, Radio Luxembourg, 1966
- Midday Spin, BBC Radio 1, 1967
- Kenny Everett Radio Show, BBC Radio 1, Sundays 10 am - noon, December 1967 - June 1968
- Foreverett, BBC Radio 1, Monday to Friday 6.45 p.m. – 7.30 pm, 22 July 1968 – 6 December 1968
- Everett is Here, BBC Radio 1, Saturdays 10 a.m. – noon, 25 January 1969 – 18 July 1970
- Kenny Everett Radio Show, BBC Local Radio, 1971
- Kenny Everett Radio Show, BBC Radio 1, Sundays 1 p.m. – 3 p.m.,1973
- Kenny Everett Radio Show Capital Radio, Late 1973
- Breakfast Show, Capital Radio, 1974–75
- Kenny Everett Audio Show/Cassette, Capital Radio, 1975–1980
- Kenny Everett Audio Show/Cassette, Radio Victory, 1975–76
- Captain Kremmen, Capital Radio, Radio Victory, 1976–80 (episodes repeated later on Capital Gold)
- Kenny Everett Radio Show, BBC Radio 2, Saturdays 11 a.m. – 1 p.m., 1981–1983
- Kenny Everett Audio Show, Capital Radio, Saturdays 11 a.m. – 1 p.m., 1984–1988
- Weekday afternoons, Capital Gold, 1 p.m. – 4 p.m., 1988–1993
- Weekday mid-mornings, Capital Gold, 9 a.m. – noon, 1993–1994

== Television ==
Everett's first screen appearance was in the 1965 film Dateline Diamonds, which had a plot based around the pirate ship MV Galaxy. He also appeared in several television series, beginning in 1968 with a production for Granada Television called Nice Time which was co-presented by Germaine Greer and Jonathan Routh. In 1970 he made three series for London Weekend Television (LWT): The Kenny Everett Explosion, Making Whoopee and Ev; and he also took part (along with such talents as Willie Rushton and John Wells) in the 1972 BBC TV series Up Sunday.

Although he was never a regular presenter on Top of the Pops, in 1973, Everett made seven appearances (six as solo host, and one as a co-host), in the months leading up to his departure from the BBC to join Capital Radio. Also in 1973, Everett provided the voice of the cat 'Charley' in the Charley Says animated series of public information films. Everett was the announcer on the original version of ATV's "big box game" Celebrity Squares, which ran on ITV from 1975 to 1979.

He was a frequent panel guest on the BBC quiz show Blankety Blank. On his first appearance in 1979, he unexpectedly bent Terry Wogan's microphone, the so-called Wogan's Wand. This became a running joke whenever Everett appeared on the show. He also hosted two short-lived quiz shows late in his career, Brainstorm and Gibberish. He was a team captain on That's Showbusiness.

=== The Kenny Everett Video Show ===
In 1978, London's Thames Television offered him a new venture, which became The Kenny Everett Video Show. This was a vehicle for Everett's characters and sketches (his fellow writers were Ray Cameron, Barry Cryer and Dick Vosburgh), interspersed with the latest pop hits, either performed by the artists themselves, or as backing tracks to dance routines by Arlene Phillips' risqué dance troupe Hot Gossip (which featured Sarah Brightman).

Various pop and TV stars made cameo appearances on the show, including Rod Stewart, Elkie Brooks, Billy Connolly, Kate Bush, Cliff Richard, Freddie Mercury, Terry Wogan and Suzi Quatro. Classical musicians such as Julian Lloyd Webber also appeared.

There were also the stories of Captain Kremmen, a science fiction hero voiced by Everett and originally developed for his Capital Radio shows, who travelled the galaxy battling fictional alien menaces, along with his assistant Dr Gitfinger and his voluptuous sidekick Carla. In the first three series these segments were animations created by the Cosgrove-Hall partnership (responsible for the successful children's cartoon series Danger Mouse, among many others). In the fourth series (Video Cassette), Kremmen was featured as live action with Anna Dawson playing Carla; the segments were comedy shorts rather than the earlier stories.

Other characters included: ageing rock-and-roller Sid Snot, unsuccessfully flipping cigarettes into his mouth—at one point Everett managed to catch one in his mouth, to the amusement of the studio crew; Marcel Wave, a lecherous Frenchman played by Everett wearing an absurdly false latex chin; and "Angry of Mayfair", a right-wing, upper-middle-class City gent complaining of the permissive, risqué content of the show, banging the camera's lens hood with his umbrella before storming off, turning his back to the camera to reveal him wearing women's lingerie in lieu of the entire back half of his suit.

He also created the never-seen character of "Lord Thames", supposedly the owner of Thames Television (the company was actually owned by two conglomerates). The character was often the butt of Everett's rants and was said to symbolise his contempt for senior management at the company, claiming they lived behind an ancient, cobweb-covered door marked as the "Office of Saying 'No'". Thames never disciplined him for these comments, unlike prior employers such as the BBC.

The show ran for four series on ITV. The last episode of Series 3 ended with Everett giving a farewell speech as the set and scenery was being stripped down by the crew. The final shot before the closing credits was Everett himself being picked up and placed inside an oversized dustbin.

The fourth series was retitled The Kenny Everett Video Cassette and was more of a comedy programme than the previous three series, which relied more on music acts.

=== The Kenny Everett Television Show ===
Everett fell out with Thames regarding the management of his show, including the scheduling against the BBC's top-rated Top of the Pops on Thursday evenings. The BBC offered him a live-audience sketch-format comedy programme, starting with a Christmas special on BBC1 in 1981, followed by five primetime series between 1982 and 1988. The writing team was bolstered by the addition of Andrew Marshall, David Renwick and Neil Shand and the production standards were raised by the heavier investment from the corporation.

Thames Television claimed copyright on Everett's characters and tried to prevent their use by the BBC. Although this action failed, it did lead to the creation of new characters such as General Cheeseburger whose monologues were seen as a satire on US foreign policy, agony aunt Verity Treacle, mime artist Maurice Mimer whose drawings turn into real objects, upper class socialite Jeremy Mince who was perpetually drunk on champagne, orange-haired punk Gizzard Puke (intended to replace Sid Snot) and the spooneristically named Cupid Stunt, a blonde glamorous American B-movie actress with pneumatic breasts. Played in full drag but with no attempt to disguise Everett's beard, she told a cardboard cut-out of chat show host Michael Parkinson (and later Terry Wogan depicted as a skeleton in a suit) about her latest trashy film projects and lurid tales of life on set with male stars such as Burt Reynolds. Her final action in each sketch was to uncross her legs then swing them wildly to recross them (brazenly giving viewers an eyeful of her racy red lingerie) as she uttered the catchphrase "It's all done in the best possible taste!" Inept TV handyman Reg Prescott became another firm viewers' favourite, as each week he managed to visibly injure himself with tools while attempting to demonstrate DIY tips. Revived characters from the previous series included Sid Snot, Marcel Wave, Brother Lee Love, Angry of Mayfair and the Constable. Each episode in season 3 featured a version of "Snot Rap – Part II" by one or more of Everett's main characters.

Brazilian-born Cleo Rocos co-starred in the BBC series. She often appeared in nothing more than frilly underwear and high heels.

=== Timeline ===
- Nice Time, Granada Television, 1968
- The Kenny Everett Explosion, LWT, 1970
- The Kenny Everett Video Show, Thames Television, 1978–1980
- The Kenny Everett Video Cassette, Thames Television, 1981
- The Kenny Everett Television Show, BBC1, 1981–1988
- Brainstorm, BBC1, 1988
- That's Showbusiness (team captain), BBC1, 1989–1991
- Gibberish, BBC1, 1992

== Video ==
In 1981, Everett, Cryer and Cameron teamed up with Brothers Music to target the emerging home video market with a VHS release called The Kenny Everett Naughty Joke Box, which was followed a year later by another Brothers Music VHS release called The New Kenny Everett Naughty Video. Produced and directed by co-writer Ray Cameron, this 'too rude for television' production would get a nationwide Freeview broadcast under the name Kenny Everett Naughty Video by That's TV in January 2022. The video was recorded with an audience (in-vision beside Everett for much of the time), while co-writer Barry Cryer has an on-screen role, appearing as a guest alongside Lionel Blair and Willie Rushton. Sheila Steafel, Cleo Rocos, Debbie Linden, Linda Lusardi and Jane Score also feature in the cast, while Nikolai Grishanovich turns up at the end to make a comment about the Soviet Union. Characters appearing in the video include Gizzard Puke, Marcel Wave, Sid Snot and a caricature of an Australian called Bris Troop, while the video has a running joke about people at a line of urinals.

== Film ==
Everett made one foray into film with 1984's Bloodbath at the House of Death, a spoof of contemporary horror films, which was penned by Everett's usual writing partners Barry Cryer and Ray Cameron (who also directed the film). Vincent Price was featured as the villain, credited only as the "Sinister Man", and a number of other popular comedians and actors also appeared, including Pamela Stephenson, Gareth Hunt and Don Warrington. Several regulars from Everett's television series also appeared.

== Music ==
Everett released three singles in the 1960s: a comedy collaboration with fellow Radio London DJ Dave Cash, "The B Side"/"Knees" (Decca Records) in 1965; a solo single written by Harry Nilsson, "It's Been So Long" (MGM Records), in 1968; and in 1969 "Nice Time" (Deram Records), which was used as the title theme for the second series of the Granada TV show. In 1977, Everett collaborated with Mike Vickers to release the single "Captain Kremmen", using a previously published instrumental by Vickers, "Retribution", as its backing. It entered the UK charts on 12 November and peaked at number 32 two weeks later. In 1983 Kenny Everett released the single "Snot Rap", ostensibly sung by two of his TV characters, Sid Snot and Cupid Stunt. This would peak at number 9 in the UK charts for the week ending 16 April, and peaked at number 91 in Australia. A sequel single, "Snot Rap II (Rapping Again)", once again performed in character, was released in March 1985, but failed to chart.

== Personal life ==
Everett married the businesswoman and self-proclaimed spiritual healer Audrey "Lady Lee" Middleton at Kensington Register Office on 2 June 1969. By September 1979, they had separated, and he stopped publicly denying his homosexuality in the late 1980s. His co-host David Cash, in the documentary Unforgettable Kenny Everett, states that "Once I got to know him socially off the ship, it was very obvious that his sexual tendencies were homosexual and he looked at it as bad and so he fought it all the way." One of his first boyfriends, a waiter called Dave Nealon, was a match found for Everett by his former wife. In 1985 after coming out, he introduced his "two husbands", Nikolai Grishanovich and Pepe Flores, to the media.

=== Politics ===
During the 1983 general election campaign, the Young Conservatives invited Everett to their conference in an attempt to attract the youth vote. Egged on by film director Michael Winner, Everett bounded onto the stage, wearing the enormously oversized foam rubber hands familiar from his mock-evangelical character Brother Lee Love. He shouted slogans such as "Let's bomb Russia!" and "Let's kick Michael Foot's stick away!" to loud applause. Foot was the aging leader of the Labour Party at the time, who used a walking stick. Everett later said he regretted the appearance and said that he had taken the foam hands to the rally because the Tories "asked me first".

In an interview on Ireland's The Late Late Show with Gay Byrne and Sinéad O'Connor in February 1989, Everett was challenged by O'Connor about his support for the Conservative Party in the light of his homosexuality and the party's Section 28 addition to the Local Government Act. Everett clarified that he was not a "full Tory", but that he had been appalled by the actions of trade unionist Arthur Scargill, whom he saw as "inciting violence" and "rabble rousing" and who he thought looked like "Hitler reborn". He had consequently supported the actions of Margaret Thatcher in opposing Scargill. He said he would stand up for gay rights if he were asked providing "it was a jolly occasion", but he also felt that being in a minority and in the public eye, he could do more for gay rights by showing that he was funny and human rather than by marching in the streets.

=== Friendship with Freddie Mercury ===
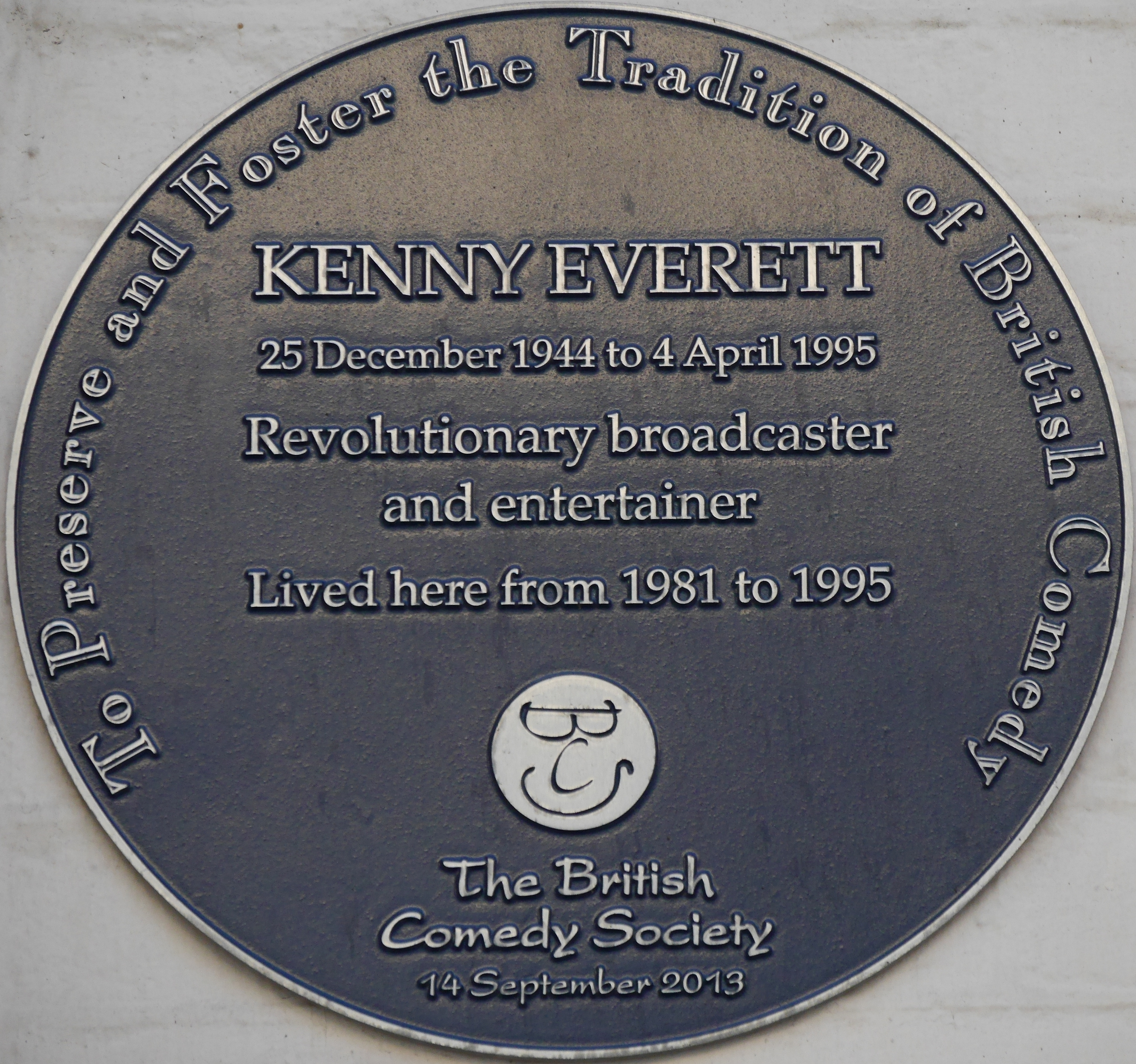
Plaque at 91 Lexham Gardens, Kensington, London, Everett's home from 1981 to 1995

Everett became close friends with Freddie Mercury, the lead vocalist and pianist of Queen, after they met on Everett's breakfast radio show on Capital Radio in 1974.

In 1988, Middleton, who had subsequently married actor John Alkin, published an autobiography with a foreword from Everett. After its publication and newspaper serialisation, Everett denounced the book for outing him. Mercury reportedly sided with Middleton. The fallout resulted in Middleton and Everett communicating only via their lawyers.

A year later, Everett and Mercury were reconciled when both were suffering with health issues due to complications with HIV. Mercury died in November 1991.

== Illness and death ==
Everett announced that he was HIV positive in April 1993, after a number of articles in the British tabloid press questioning his health. His former partner, Nikolai Grishanovich, had died from AIDS-related pneumonia in 1991. On disclosing his HIV status, Everett said that he had known he was HIV positive "for about 4 years" but may have contracted the virus a few years previously.

In the summer of 1994, Everett left his Capital Radio show on extended sick leave after contracting pneumonia. He initially recovered from this infection but died the following spring, on 4 April 1995, aged 50.

A Catholic requiem mass was held at Church of the Immaculate Conception in Mayfair, London. His body was cremated at Mortlake Crematorium.

== Legacy ==
In 1981, Everett co-wrote a semi-fictitious autobiography entitled The Custard Stops at Hatfield. It was published by Willow Books, an imprint of Collins, in September 1982.

Kenny Everett Comic Heritage plaque originally located within Teddington Studios, moved to the riverfront Thames Walkway following the studio's demolition in 2016

In 1996, a compilation album entitled Kenny Everett at the Beeb was released as part of the BBC Radio Collection series of cassette tapes. The album, narrated by Barry Cryer, is a chronological look at Everett's BBC Radio career that combines clips from his various series with interviews that he gave on programmes such as Desert Island Discs.

Everett is the subject of a 1997 episode of the Thames Television series Heroes of Comedy which covers his life and career from his beginnings on pirate radio until his death. Celebrities such as Steve Wright, Cliff Richard, Cleo Rocos, Barry Cryer, Jeremy Beadle, Terry Wogan and Barry Took appear and talk about their experiences, collaborations and friendships with Everett and his influence on them.

In 2006, the British public ranked Everett number 45 in ITV's poll of TV's 50 Greatest Stars. On 18 November 2007, ITV1 broadcast a tribute show to Everett entitled Licence to Laugh. This celebrated the 30 years since he first appeared on ITV with the Kenny Everett Video Show (Thames Television). Friends and colleagues revealed what it was like to know and work with the man they affectionately dubbed "Cuddly Ken". Additionally, contemporary celebrities such as Chris Moyles and Chris Tarrant talked about their love for the funny entertainer and discussed the ways in which Everett had influenced them and their work. It also featured archive footage.

The documentary When Freddie Mercury Met Kenny Everett, broadcast on Channel 4, tells the story of the relationship between the two men from the moment they met in 1974 when Mercury was a guest on Everett's radio show, through lovers and drug-taking to when both died of AIDS. It features affectionate interviews by many people who were close to him.

In March 2010 the BBC confirmed that it was producing a 90-minute TV biographical film called Number One in Heaven, to be written by Tim Whitnall and focusing on Everett's unhappiness at secondary school.

On 3 October 2012 the BBC broadcast a 90-minute TV biopic called The Best Possible Taste which focused on the performer's relationship with his wife, singer Lee Middleton. Oliver Lansley played the part of Everett and Katherine Kelly that of Middleton.

In 2013, Hello Darlings! The Authorized Biography Of Kenny Everett written by James Hogg and Robert Sellers was published by Bantam Press.

Everett was portrayed by Dickie Beau in the 2018 Oscar-winning film Bohemian Rhapsody, a biographical musical drama about the life of Freddie Mercury.

In December 2024, BBC Radio 4 Extra broadcast a week of programmes to mark what would have been Everett's 80th birthday. It began with a documentary Kenny Everett: The BBC Local Radio Years and included some of Everett's BBC Radio Bristol shows from 1971.

== Bibliography ==
- Everett, Kenny (1980). "Contributor". David Jacobs' Book of Celebrities' Jokes & Anecdotes. By Jacobs, David. Robson Books. p. 42. ISBN 0860511251.
