= Lee Everett Alkin =

British businesswoman (1937–2022)

- Born: Audrey Valentine Middleton; 14 February 1937; Sheffield, South Yorkshire, England
- Died: 24 February 2022 (aged 85); Berkshire, England
- Other names: Lee Everett, Lady Lee
- Occupations: Spiritual healer; businesswoman
- Spouses: Alan Bradshaw (div. 1958) Kenny Everett (m. 1969; div. 1984); John Alkin (m. 1985)

Lee Everett Alkin (born Audrey Valentine Middleton; 14 February 1937 – 24 February 2022) was a British businesswoman and self-proclaimed spiritual healer who was previously a pop singer and celebrity psychic working under the stage name Lady Lee.

== Life in showbusiness ==
Born in Sheffield as Audrey Valentine Middleton, she moved to London in 1958 after the breakdown of her first marriage to local footballer, Alan Bradshaw. She had fallen in love with aspiring rock star, Alex Wharton, and followed him where he formed the band Most Brothers. The relationship did not last long, though she found herself a job singing at the 2i's Coffee Bar in Soho, where Cliff Richard had been discovered. She was spotted here by pop music impresario Larry Parnes.

She was a backing singer for Emile Ford before Parnes became her manager and gave her the stage name "Lady Lee". She also attracted media attention as the girlfriend of Billy Fury, one of Parnes's best known artists. In 1964 she got a recording contract and released three singles, none a hit: a cover of "I'm into Something Good", recorded around the same time by Herman's Hermits; "Ninety-Nine Times Out of a Hundred" by Ivor Raymonde, released in May 1965; and "My Whole World (Seems to be Tumbling Down)" by Tony Macaulay and Don Paul, released in October 1965.

She moved into a large house in Surrey with Billy Fury, though she left him in 1967 and came back to London to try and revive her showbiz career. Very few auditions came her way, and at one point she auditioned for the Raymond Revue bar, not realising it was a strip club. She walked out as soon as she realised her mistake.

Soon afterwards, she met disc jockey Kenny Everett, who was one of the first DJs for BBC Radio 1. They enjoyed the high life, partying with celebrities such as Freddie Mercury, and John Lennon, who provided them with LSD. They married at Chelsea register office, and she made her own wedding dress out of a table cloth from Harrods. However, they separated in 1979 after Kenny Everett had come to terms with his sexuality, and divorced in 1984. He wrote the foreword to her autobiography, published in 1987, but later criticised the book for outing him; the two remained estranged until his death. Katherine Kelly played Lee in The Best Possible Taste, a BBC drama about Kenny Everett shown in 2012.

Everett was a friend of Dusty Springfield, Elton John and Billie Jean King; the latter two were among those she questioned about supposed past lives for a book she published in 1996.

Everett met the actor John Alkin at a house party thrown by Richard Branson. They began collaborating on an interest in past life regression therapy and mindfulness, and in 1982 they opened the "House of Spirit", a "healing centre" in Bayswater, London. They married in 1985, moved to Berkshire in 1994, and opened the "Obsidian College", another "healing centre", in 2000. They also started the "Chilliqueen" condiments company, which wound down when Everett turned 80 in 2017.

Following the death of Springfield, in 1999, she began caring for Nicholas, a cat who Springfield "willed" to her when she became sick with cancer, at the apartment she shared with Alkin, in Hollywood, California, US. The cat had been with Springfield for 13 years, with the cat reported to sleep on affects from Springfield, ate "tinned baby food", was comforted by Springfield's songs, was walked three times a day. and had a "high indoor tree house studded with hearts" in which he lived. While Nicholas was originally separated from her Everett's cat, at the time, Purrdie, it was reported that she was arranging a "marriage" between the two cats.

Lee Everett Alkin died from cancer on 24 February 2022, at the age of 85.

== Works ==
- Everett, Lee; Everett, Kenny (1976). The Lee and Kenny Everett cookery book. London: Duckworth. ISBN 0715611372.
- Everett, Lee; Stewart, Gloria (1983). The happy medium. London: Futura. ISBN 0708822258.
- Everett Alkin, Lee (1987). Kinds of loving : the autobiography of Lee Everett. London: Columbus.
- Everett, Lee (1996). Celebrity regressions : past lives of the famous as told to Britain's leading therapist. London: W Foulsham. ISBN 0572022972.
