= Supernature (Cerrone III) =

Studio album by Cerrone
- Released: September 1977
- Recorded: June–August 1977
- Studio: Trident Studios, London
- Genre: Electronic; Disco
- Length: 33:54 (digital version)
- Label: Malligator
- Producer: Cerrone

Cerrone chronology
Cerrone's Paradise (Cerrone II) (1977)	Supernature (Cerrone III) (1977)	Cerrone IV: The Golden Touch (1978)

Singles from Supernature (Cerrone III)
- 1. "Supernature" Released: 1977; 2. "Give Me Love" Released: 1977

Supernature is Cerrone's third album, released in September 1977. It was released in France on Malligator Records. It is known also as Cerrone III, since it is the third album by Cerrone, who labeled his albums with a number.

== Track listing ==
Supernature digital edition
No.	Title	Writer(s)	Length
1.	"Supernature"	Marc Cerrone; Alain Wisniak	9:45
2.	"Sweet Drums"	Cerrone	2:40
3.	"In the Smoke"	Cerrone; Wisniak	5:32
4.	"Give Me Love"	Cerrone; Wisniak	7:42
5.	"Love Is Here"	Cerrone; Wisniak	2:24
6.	"Love Is the Answer"	Cerrone; Wisniak	5:51
Total length:			33:54

Note: these times apply to the digital edition, vinyl and the CD timings have different values.

=== Notes ===
It has also been released in CD format in Europe and the US.

In the inner sleeve, disco producer Don Ray, co-writer Alain Wisniak and singer Lene Lovich are thanked “for their kindness, talent & comprehension”.

"Supernature" is one of Cerrone's best-known tracks. It was remixed in 1996 by Danny Tenaglia into his traditional deep progressive Twilo sound. The track "Love Is the Answer" was re-edited by Liquid People and released as part of volume one of the Africanism All Stars project released by Yellow Productions.
