= Supernature (song) =

Single by Cerrone

from the album Supernature (Cerrone III)
- Released: December 1977
- Recorded: June–August 1977
- Studio: Trident Studios, London
- Genre: Disco; Euro Disco
- Length: 3:50 (single edit); 9:45 (album version)
- Label: Malligator
- Songwriters: Cerrone; Alain Wisniak; Lene Lovich
- Producer: Cerrone

Music video
- "Supernature" on YouTube

"Supernature" is the title track of French disco drummer and composer Cerrone's 1977 album Supernature (Cerrone III). Along with the tracks "Give Me Love" and "Love Is Here", the song reached number one on the US disco/dance charts in early 1978. The single also crossed over to both the Billboard Hot 100, where it peaked at number 70, and the soul charts, where it peaked at number 72. In August 1978, "Supernature" peaked at number eight in the UK Singles Chart following heavy exposure on the first series of The Kenny Everett Video Show.

== Background ==
The lyrics were written by a young Lene Lovich, though she was not credited. The song features an environmental theme, imagining a future where the use of artificial chemicals in agriculture has caused "creatures down below" to emerge and "take their sweet revenge" against mankind. The lyrics were inspired by The Island of Dr. Moreau. The uncredited vocalist is the session singer Kay Garner.

== Reception ==
In 2016, Pitchfork ranked "Supernature" as the 187th best song of the 1970s, stating that it "introduced an unprecedented strain of dystopian disco dread. Neither Kraftwerk nor Berlin-era Bowie had an immediate international dancefloor impact as profound as "Supernature". As the track grows more sinister, mutant monsters take their revenge until humanity reverts to a primitive state where it must once again earn its place." In 2020, Slant Magazine ranked the song number four in their list of "The 100 Best Dance Songs of All Time". In 2025, Billboard magazine ranked it number seven in their "The 100 Best Dance Songs of All Time" list.

== Charts ==
Chart (1978)	Peak position
Canada Dance/Urban (RPM)	1
France (IFOP)	26
Ireland (IRMA)	11
UK Singles (Official Charts)	8
US Billboard Hot 100	70
US Hot Dance Club Play (Billboard)	1
US Hot Soul Singles (Billboard)	72

Chart (1996) (remix)	Peak position
UK Singles (Official Charts)	66
US Hot Dance Club Play (Billboard)	12
US Hot Dance Music/Maxi-Singles Sales (Billboard)	26

Chart (2001)	Peak position
France (SNEP)	69

Chart (2006)^{1}	Peak position
US Hot Dance Club Play (Billboard)	5

^{1} J. Garraud & D. Tenaglia mixes

== Popular culture ==
- Synthpop duo Erasure released a cover version of "Supernature" in 1989.
- An instrumental edit of the song is used in Gaspar Noé's 2018 film Climax, being used for its opening choreography.
- The band Goldfrapp named their third studio album after the song.
- On 26 July 2024, the 2024 Summer Olympics opening ceremony used the theme "Supernature" as one of the main songs played with an outstanding spectacle of lights coming from the Eiffel Tower and performed by a sign language artist.

== See also ==
- List of number-one dance singles of 1978 (U.S.)
- List of RPM number-one dance singles of 1978
