= Anna Dawson =

English actress (1937–2026)

- Born: Anna F. Dawson; 27 July 1937; Bolton, Lancashire, England
- Died: 27 June 2026 (aged 88); Kerikeri, New Zealand
- Occupation: Actress
- Years active: 1964–1995
- Spouse: John Boulter (m. 1985; died 2025)

Anna F. Boulter (née Dawson; 27 July 1937 – 27 June 2026) was an English actress and singer, who had a career on stage and screen lasting three decades. She appeared in various theatre productions and had several roles in television and entertainment programmes including Dixon of Dock Green, Bad Boyes, The Benny Hill Show and The Kenny Everett Show. Her final acting role was as Violet in the BBC sitcom Keeping Up Appearances, before moving to a retirement village in New Zealand.

== Life and career ==
Anna F. Dawson was born in Bolton, Lancashire, on 27 July 1937. She spent part of her childhood in Tanganyika, where her father worked. Dawson attended the Elmhurst Ballet School and after training at the Central School of Speech and Drama, she learned her craft by playing in repertory theatre companies.

During her career, Dawson appeared in several West End musicals and theatre productions, as well as making various appearances in television shows and entertainment programmes, which included Dixon of Dock Green, The Benny Hill Show, The Generation Game, Give Us a Clue and 3-2-1. Her later roles included Bonnie in Bad Boyes and Stella Whipple in Don't Tell Father, with her final role prior to retirement being as Hyacinth Bucket's sister Violet ("the one with the Mercedes, sauna and room for a pony") in the fifth and final series of the sitcom Keeping Up Appearances in 1995.

Dawson married former Black and White Minstrel Show soloist John Boulter in 1985. They subsequently moved to New Zealand where they lived in various retirement villages. They remained together until Boulter's death in December 2025. Dawson died in Kerikeri, New Zealand, on 27 June 2026, aged 88.

== Filmography ==
=== Film ===
Year	Title	Role
1973	O Lucky Man!	Becky
1973	Love Thy Neighbour	Betty
1975	The Sexplorer a.k.a. The Girl From Starship Venus	Store; Manageress
1977	Stand Up, Virgin Soldiers	Glam #1
1981	If You Go Down in the Woods Today	Courting woman
1984	Gabrielle and the Doodleman	Wicked Witch
1984	Bloodbath at the House of Death	Nurse

=== Television ===
Year	Title	Role	Notes
1964–1966	Dixon of Dock Green	Mary Crawford	23 episodes
1965	Mother Goose	Squire's daughter	TV film
1971	Slapstick and Old Lace	Various	
1971	Brian Rix Presents...	Various	7 episodes
1973	Z-Cars	Sheila Clowes	Episode: "Domestic"
1975–1989	The Benny Hill Show	Various	9 episodes
1976–1978, 1980	What's on Next?	Various	
1976–1981	The Generation Game	Self	4 episodes
1977	Hi Summer!		
1977	Larry Grayson	Bubbles	3 episodes
1977	Miss Jones and Son	Carole	Episode: 'Baby Talk'
1978	Bernie		1 episode
1978	'ITV Votes for Women' 50th Anniversary Gala		One-Off special
1978	Whodunnit?	Panellist	5 episodes
1978–1979, 1985	Blankety Blank	Panellist	5 episodes
1978–1989	Give Us a Clue	Guest Contestant	8 episodes
1978	The Morecambe & Wise Show	Bandaged Newsreader / Lola	Christmas Special
1978–1979	Rings on Their Fingers	Deirdre	4 episodes
1979	The Dick Emery Special	Various	
1979	Leslie Crowther's Scrapbook	Various	
1979, 1982, 1986	3-2-1	Guest Entertainer	10 episodes
1980	Robin's Nest	Atalanta	Episode: "Just an Old-Fashioned Girl"
1980	Life Begins at Forty	Jill Simpson	4 episodes
1980	The Crowther Collection	Various	
1980	The Dick Emery Hour	Various	
1980	The Allan Stewart Show		
1980–1981	The Kenny Everett Video Show	Carla / Various	8 episodes
1980–1982	Keep It in the Family	Mrs Morgan / Woman Juror	2 episodes
1981	It's A Celebrity Knockout	Celebrity Contestant (Budgie)	
1981	The Jim Davidson Show		1 episode
1981	The Paul Squire Show		
1981	The Kenny Everett Video Cassette	Carla	
1982	Royal Variety Performance	Introductory Sequence	
1982	The Generation Game	Guest during run-up to 1982 Wimbledon Pantomime	
1982	The Good Old Days	Guest Entertainer	3 episodes
1983	All for Love	Wife	Episode: "Down at the Hydro"
1984	The Steam Video Company	Various	6 episodes
1985	The New Statesman	Enid Vance	6 episodes
1986	Crosswits	Celebrity Panellist	
1986	Rainbow	Self	Episode: "Decision Making"
1986	The Sooty Show	Guest (Swimming Pool etc.)	
1986	Smith & Jones	Various	Episode: "Football Supporters on a Plane"
1986	Super Gran	Wendy Whiplash	Episode: "Supergran and the World's Worst Circus"
1988	Bad Boyes	Bonnie	7 episodes
1991	Benny Hill: Unseen	Various	TV film
1992	Don't Tell Father	Stella Whipple	3 episodes
1995	Keeping Up Appearances	Violet	4 episodes
