= The Kenny Everett Video Show =

Thames TV comedy and music show 1978–1981

- Also known as: The Kenny Everett; Video Cassette (series 4)
- Created by: David Mallet
- Written by: Ray Cameron; Barry Cryer; Kenny Everett; Dick Vosburgh (series 1)
- Directed by: David Mallet (series 1–3); Royston Mayoh (series 4)
- Starring: Kenny Everett; Hot Gossip
- Country of origin: United Kingdom
- Original language: English
- No. of series: 4
- No. of episodes: 35 (including 3 specials) (list of episodes)

Production
- Production locations: Thames Television House, Euston Road, London; Teddington Studios
- Running time: 38 minutes (series 1); 24 minutes (series 2–4); 50 minutes (special)
- Production company: Thames Television

Original release
- Network: ITV
- Release: 3 July 1978 – 21 May 1981

Related
- The Kenny Everett Television Show

The Kenny Everett Video Show (later renamed The Kenny Everett Video Cassette) is a British television comedy and music programme that was made by Thames Television for ITV from 3 July 1978 to 21 May 1981.

== Overview ==
Philip Jones, Thames Television's head of light entertainment, asked his son who he would like to see on television - he replied Kenny Everett. The show's format was conceived over lunch and a walk between producer David Mallet and Everett himself, having decided that they could not watch on television what they wanted to watch.

Originally, the Video Show consisted of Everett in the role of a visual DJ linking studio performances from bands, singers, and the show's resident dance troupe Hot Gossip, along with occasional sketches and Captain Kremmen cartoons. As the series developed, the linking material became longer and more varied - to such an extent that the final series, renamed The Kenny Everett Video Cassette, focused far more heavily on the comedy with just one musical guest per week.

The Video Show was performed to the studio crew with their laughter heard on the finished programme, unlike Everett's later BBC series, The Kenny Everett Television Show, which had a conventional live studio audience. Bloopers were often not edited out of sketches. Two pilot episodes were made, which no longer exist. Initially, the series was produced at Thames' Euston Road headquarters in central London and recorded in small studios normally used for news and current affairs programmes. Production was later transferred to Thames' main studios in Teddington.

As of October 2021, the series was being repeated on nostalgia-themed Freeview station That's TV Gold alongside another Thames TV comedy show licensed from Fremantle, The Best of Tommy Cooper. That's TV have kept Everett's 'naughty bits' intact with a warning added at the beginning of the programme and after the advert break, due to the prospect of the content causing offence to modern viewers.

== Series guide ==
=== Series 1 ===
The first episode of the Video Show aired at 6:45 pm on Monday, 3 July 1978. The eight-part series (45 minutes per episode) continued until 21 August 1978 and consisted mostly of musical performances, alongside Hot Gossip routines, Captain Kremmen cartoons and occasional OB segments.

The Video Vault clips segment included a Rock of Ages section, which predominantly featured clips from the ABC Television music series, Oh Boy!. Regular comic characters included 'Sid Snot', 'Angry of Mayfair' and Everett dressed in a chicken outfit. A Best of... compilation aired in some regions after the end of the series.

The following year, series one won the BAFTA television award for Best Light Entertainment Programme.

=== Series 2 ===
Prior to the second series, the programme returned on New Year's Day 1979 in most ITV regions (except Scottish Television, which aired the special on 7 January 1979) with the Didn't Quite Make it in Time for Christmas Video Show, which also aired in a shortened version on 18 April 1979 - as ITV's entry for the Golden Rose of Montreux.

Series Two began at 7:00 pm on Monday 19 February 1979 with an extended ten-episode run (30 minutes per episode) and a greater reliance on comedy material.

=== Series 3 ===
The Video Show returned at 11:00 pm on New Year's Eve 1979 with an hour-long special, Will Kenny Everett Make it to 1980? on most of the ITV network. Scottish Television aired it the following afternoon while Grampian Television opted out of the final part on its original transmission.

Series 3 ran for eight episodes, starting at 7:00 pm on Monday 18 February 1980.

=== Series 4: Video Cassette ===
Everett's last New Year's special, The Kenny Everett New Year's Daze Show aired at 11:50 pm on New Year's Eve 1980 over most of the ITV network. Ulster Television never aired this special, while Grampian and Scottish broadcast it two days later.

The final series, renamed The Kenny Everett Video Cassette, saw the show moved to Thursday evenings at 7:30 in a bid to compete with BBC1's Top of the Pops. There was an even greater reliance on comedy with only one musical guest per episode. The Captain Kremmen cartoons were replaced by shorter live-action studio sketches featuring Anna Dawson as Kremmen's assistant Carla.

Unhappy with the scheduling of the series, among other concerns, Everett left Thames and moved to BBC Television.

== VHS and DVD releases ==
During the 1980s, several VHS, Betamax and Laserdisc compilations of the series were released by Thames Video. A six-DVD set containing four series - plus the three New Year specials - was released in November 2018. These are edited down, however, due to licensing issues restricting the use of certain musical acts in some episodes.

- The Best of the Kenny Everett Video Show (Vol. 1) (Thames Video - 1981)
- The Best of the Kenny Everett Video Show (Vol. 2) (Thames Video - 1982)
- The Best of the Kenny Everett Video Show (Vol. 3) (Thames Video - 1982)
- Kenny Everett's Naughty Bits (Thames Video - 1989)
- More of Kenny Everett's Naughty Bits (Thames Video - 1989)
- The Kenny Everett Video Show (short term storage - 2018)

Both Naughty Bits compilations from 1989 were chosen for release on the 2004 DVD, The Complete Naughty Bits.
