= Hot Gossip =

British TV dance troupe and recording artists (1974–1986)

- 1977 publicity photo

Background information
- Years active: 1974–1986
- Labels: Ariola Hansa; Atlantic; Dindisc; DJM Records; Fanfare Records
- Spinoffs: Sponooch

Hot Gossip was a British television dance troupe and recording group.

== Formation ==
Arlene Phillips moved to London to teach American jazz dance routines, working at Pineapple Dance Studios and the Italia Conti Stage School. In 1974, Phillips started forming the core of a troupe; Italia Conti student actress Lesley Manville turned her down. Hot Gossip spent two years performing in Munkberry's club in Jermyn Street, London W1, where Phillips and manager/producers Michael Summerton and Iain Burton developed the group's act. Phillips, Summerton and Burton continued to work together for eight years.

== Career ==
=== The Kenny Everett Video Show ===
British television director David Mallet invited Phillips to make Hot Gossip a regular feature of The Kenny Everett Video Show (Thames Television, 1978–1981). Dancers in this version of Hot Gossip included:

- males: Mark Tyme, Roy Gayle, Floyd Pearce
- females: Dominique Wood, Donna Fielding, Carol Fletcher, Perri Lister, Lyndsey Ward, Sarah Brightman, Lorraine Whitmarsh

Everett moved to the BBC for The Kenny Everett Television Show (1981–1988), which featured Hot Gossip only in Season 4 (1986).

=== Recordings ===
In 1978, during their initial impact period on The Kenny Everett Video Show, Hot Gossip, featuring Sarah Brightman on lead vocals, recorded "I Lost My Heart to a Starship Trooper", a disco song written by Jeff Calvert and Geraint Hughes. The song reached number 6 on the UK Singles Chart. In 1981, the group recorded a cover version of Suzanne Fellini's "Love on the Phone", and the same year released the synth-pop album Geisha Boys and Temple Girls, produced by former Human League and then current Heaven 17/BEF member Martyn Ware.

=== The Very Hot Gossip Show ===
Produced by Burton and Telecast for Channel 4 in 1982, this one-hour special was one of the highest rated shows for Channel 4 that year.

=== Film appearance ===
The group appeared in the film The Golden Lady (1979). Members of the group appear in several scenes performing dance sequences in the Pet Shop Boys' 1987 Jack Bond-directed feature film It Couldn't Happen Here.

== Style ==
Hot Gossip were noted for the risqué nature of their costumes and dance routines, designed and choreographed by Phillips, especially considering the early evening timeslot for The Kenny Everett Video Show.

== Sponooch ==
In late 1979 Mark Tyme, Dom Wood, Lorraine Whitmarsh, Carol Fletcher, Lyndsey Ward, Donna Fielding and Lee Black left Hot Gossip to form Sponooch, which was featured in the BBC TV shows Friday Night Saturday Morning (1979) and Dancing Girls (6 January 1982). They signed to EMI and released two singles, "Crime Buster" and "Lady Dracula".

== List of Hot Gossip members ==
- Amanda Abbs
- Heather Alexander
- Debbie Ash
- Debbie Astell
- Dee Thomas
- Bunty Bailey
- Elvis Baptiste
- Lee Black
- Richard Bodkin
- Sarah Brightman
- Bonnie Bryg
- Kathy Burke (Note: Not to be confused with the actress of the same name.)
- Lindsay Cole
- Titian Deakin
- Lorraine Doyle
- Annie Dunkley
- Penni Dunlop
- Sandy Easby
- Mark Elie
- Yvonne Evans (Voyd)
- Donna Fielding
- Carol Fletcher
- Alan Forgie
- Debbie Fox
- Judey Ford
- Julia Gale
- Roy Gayle
- Donnette Goddard
- Heavon Grant
- Virginia Hartley
- Alison Hierlehy
- Nicky Hinkley
- Laura James
- Lavinia Lang (Hudson)
- Kim Leeson
- Perri Lister
- Richard Lloyd King
- Madeleine Loftin
- Erin Lordan
- Barry Martin
- Jayne Melville
- Sarah Miles (Note: Not to be confused with the actress of the same name.)
- Johanna Kate Morley
- Jane Colthorpe
- Trudy Pack
- Floid Pearce
- Tristan Rafael
- Sinitta Renet
- Heather Robbins
- Wanda Rokicki
- Heather Seymour
- Sonia Talbot
- Bruno Tonioli
- Mark Tyme
- Lyndsey Ward
- Susie Waring
- Lorraine Whitmarsh
- Chrissy Wickham
- David Wilkins
- Phillipa Williams
- Frances Wingate
- Dominique Wood
- Penny Kendell
- Michelle Gail Fellows
- Libby Rose
- Cherry B
