= List of The Brittas Empire characters =

Main Characters of The Brittas Empire (left to right): Julie Porter (Judy Flynn), Linda Perkins (Jill Greenacre), Gavin Featherly (Tim Marriott), Gordon Brittas (Chris Barrie), Helen Brittas (Pippa Haywood), Laura Lancing (Julia St John), Carole Parkinson (Harriet Thorpe), Colin Weatherby (Mike Burns), Tim Whistler (Russell Porter)

This is a list of characters from The Brittas Empire, a British television sitcom that aired on BBC1 from 1991 to 1997.

== Gordon Brittas ==
Gordon Wellesley Brittas
- First appearance: Series One, Episode One: "Laying the Foundations" (1991)
- Last appearance: Series Seven, Episode Eight: "Curse of the Tiger Women" (1997)
- Created by: Andrew Norriss and Richard Fegen
- Portrayed by: Chris Barrie

In-universe information
- Occupation: Manager
- Family: Jim Brittas (father); Horatio Brittas (brother)
- Spouse: Helen Brittas (wife)
- Children: Jonathan (stepson); Tom (stepson); One unnamed (stepson); Matthew Brittas (son); Mark Gordon Brittas (son); Emily Parkinson (twin daughter with Carole Parkinson); Jessica Parkinson (twin daughter with Carole Parkinson)

Gordon Wellesley Brittas GM (born 1958) manages the ill-fated Whitbury New Town Leisure Centre.

Brittas is dedicated to his job and cares dearly for everyone around him, including his unstable wife, Helen. He has grand ambitions of making the world a better place and aims to fulfil his dream of bringing people together through sport. However, despite his noble and well-meant intentions, Brittas' management only causes disaster and chaos, resulting in pathetically low attendance rates, catastrophic fires, floods, injuries and even deaths on several occasions. In typical bureaucratic style, he is obsessed with paperwork and forces his staff and customers to fill in thousands of forms with the most banal details, such as lost property claims. Throughout the entire series, he remains blissfully unaware of his total incompetence as a manager and the negative effect he has on everybody around him.

An example of Brittas' tactlessness is in the episode "Temple Of The Body", where he suspects someone is having sex in the centre, telling Carole that she has nothing to worry about because whatever is happening is only with "younger and more attractive women, such as Linda, Julie and Laura".

Brittas is also incredibly petty and pedantic, insisting on over-complicated forms at reception, and ridiculous rules on what not to wear in the centre, only serving to frustrate potential customers and the centre staff. In the last series, Brittas rigs up a computer system to control every aspect of the centre, which overcomplicates even the simplest task of distributing floats by the swimming pools, and results in someone drowning.

Brittas is also accident-prone and often makes careless mistakes, sometimes with fatal consequences. For example, in "Laura's Leaving", Brittas tugs at a wire which drops a live electric heater into the main swimming pool, electrocuting a group of Pentecostal Christians performing a baptism ceremony in the water. Alternatively, if a small problem does develop despite his precautions, Brittas will try to solve it, thus creating a much larger problem. Helen points out in the second episode that "once [Gordon] starts dealing with little problems, they don't go away; you just get bigger ones". Then, in Series 3, the disasters in the centre typically start with something trivial going wrong, but then growing in severity. Laura points out that Brittas "gets all the difficult bits right" but when it "comes to the really simple things you blow it".

Gordon has a twin brother, Horatio Brittas, a priest who shares his dream of bringing communities together. Gordon has five children with Helen, three that he adopted from her earlier marriage and twin boys they had together; twins being a trait which runs in his side of the family. Unknown to him until the very last episode of the series, Carole's twins are also his — the result of a boozy mix-up at Julie's New Year's Eve party, where Carol and Helen happened to dress in identical tiger costumes, leading to Gordon's mistake.

Brittas can in many respects be considered a forerunner to David Brent of The Office; his lack of self-awareness and ability to alienate and offend his staff, despite his genuine good intentions, are examples of commonality between the characters.

The writers of the series, Andrew Norriss and Richard Fegen, decided to make Series 5 the final one. Thus, Brittas is "killed" by a falling water tank. However, he is brought back to life in bizarre circumstances and Chris Barrie returns to play Brittas for a further two series, as the BBC ultimately wanted it to continue. New writers were brought in to replace the series' creators; the actual ending was in 1997, when Brittas, at the end of Series 7, wakes up on a train heading for Whitbury. According to this ending, the entire series was a dream.

== Helen Brittas ==
Helen Brittas
- First appearance: Series One, Episode One: "Laying the Foundations" (1991)
- Last appearance: Series Seven, Episode Eight: "Curse of the Tiger Women" (1997)
- Created by: Richard Fegen and Andrew Norriss
- Portrayed by: Pippa Haywood

In-universe information
- Occupation: Counsellor (as of series seven)
- Spouse: Gordon Brittas
- Children: Jonathan (son); Tom (son); One unnamed (son); Matthew Brittas (son); Mark Gordon Brittas (son)

Helen Brittas (born 1956) is Gordon's unstable, unfaithful wife.

Helen starts out as a depressed housewife, disillusioned and agitated by her oblivious husband and his grand schemes, but gradually she becomes more neurotic and dependent on prescribed anti-depressants. Dr. Gray, her concerned family doctor, is reluctant to prescribe any further medication until he can speak to Gordon; a brief appointment with both Helen and Gordon is sufficient to convince Dr. Gray to write out an extra-strength prescription "for the really bad days".

Helen often requires support from Brittas's deputy Laura Lancing, and frequently pours her heart out to Laura, telling her the stress Gordon is causing her, and about her latest one night stands, flings or stupid mistakes. Helen relies on other people to lie for her, to cover up her addictive shoplifting and her frequent cheating on Gordon with other men.

Helen was married twice before her wedding to Gordon; in Series 3, episode 6 ("The Stuff of Dreams"), when discussing concerns over his legacy to the world, Gordon explains to Laura that the three sons he and Helen live with are her children from a previous marriage. One of them is named Jonathan, and he appears to be of secondary school age (11-16); it is indicated that his chemistry teacher may be the manufacturer or supplier of some of the numerous tablets that Helen uses for medication. Another son is named Tom. The third son is not named, and in the final episode, Gordon says they have only four children: it is possible that the other stepson has grown up and left home. Helen and Gordon go on to have twin boys, Matthew and Mark; due to a parking dispute en route to the hospital, the children are delivered by student nurses on a hospital bed in the middle of Whitbury High Street, the bed being part of a fundraising float for the students' "rag week".

In season 2 episode "Back from the Dead" following the apparent death of Gordon, during a trip to Bulgaria, Helen is seen preparing to marry a man she met at his cremation. This marriage does not go ahead as Gordon returns home to find her in a wedding dress before the wedding ceremony has begun. It may also be argued that Helen had another husband; on a chance encounter in Series 6, Episode 4 ("A Walk On The Wild Side") she is reunited with Harry Johnson, a visiting spiritual guru whom she first met as a teenager or young adult. She fondly remembers how a "hippy vicar" conducted what she believed to be a mock wedding, only for Harry to reveal that the minister had since become the Bishop of Maidstone. Overcome by horror, Helen seriously considers living with Harry for a trial period of "three or four years" until a blow to the head renders him unconscious (most likely killing him). The outcome is never overtly stated but Helen apparently remains with Gordon and does seem to love him.

Helen's erratic and often illegal behaviour make life difficult for Gordon on several occasions. During Series 3, a department store correctly accuses Helen of stealing a wedding dress, some shoes, a handbag, a pair of gloves, and a barbecue set; at this point, it is made clear that her criminal record includes nine previous charges of shoplifting. In "The Chop", Gordon resigns from the Leisure Centre (although he is reinstated a few weeks later) in order to protect her when she admits to taking £300 from the Centre's petty cash to buy a dog. In Series 6, Helen nearly poisons everybody in Whitbury by spiking fruit flavoured cordial from the local shop with laxative as a revenge on the cordial manufacturer for not hiring her twins for their television commercial.

Helen also possesses a latent murderous streak, once arranging for Gordon to be murdered while on holiday in Bulgaria (only for him to survive due to a mix-up involving a stolen identity). On another occasion (series 5, episode 3) one of her children is given a D grade for some English homework; having been the one who had actually done the work, Helen responds by reversing her car into the classroom in attempt to kill the teacher in revenge. She later reassures Laura that the teacher "swung up on a light fitting" and so was not harmed.

Helen appears in all episodes, apart from one in Series 4 when she "accidentally" books the family holiday to Cornwall on the wrong week, thus leaving Gordon unable to attend; a mistake she had also made the previous year.

== Laura Lancing/Farrell ==
Laura Lancing/Farrell
- First appearance: Series One, Episode One: "Laying the Foundations" (1991)
- Last appearance: Christmas Special: "In The Beginning" (1994)
- Created by: Richard Fegen and Andrew Norriss
- Portrayed by: Julia St John

In-universe information
- Occupation: Deputy Manager Dry
- Family: Michael T. Farrell (husband); Barney Farrell (son)

Laura Farrell (née Lancing) is the Deputy Manager Dry of the Centre.

Laura is calm and extremely efficient at management, often bringing normality back to the centre after a disaster has escalated. She is also the voice of reason, talking sense into those around her. Laura is usually warm and understanding, and has people's best interests at heart. A common thing she does is comfort colleague Tim when he suspects boyfriend Gavin is having an affair.

Laura understands that however much chaos her boss Gordon causes with his half-baked ideas, he means well, so she occasionally defends him from criticism from the staff, councillors and even his unhinged wife, Helen. Laura is also often seen lending support to Helen, who goes into states of shock and panic whenever Laura is away or planning to leave. Helen is convinced the centre will not cope without Laura, with no one there to "pick up the pieces" after Gordon has caused another disaster.

Gordon is seen to be very fond of Laura, perhaps because of her kind, helpful nature and his lack of close friends in his personal life. In later series, hints are dropped at a possible romance between Gordon and Laura. In one episode of Series 3, she kisses Brittas in a flurry of emotion, leaving him in a state of shock. No more is said about it, but in the next series, when Helen deliberately books a holiday that she knows Gordon cannot attend, Laura proves very supportive towards him, and the two bond further. A scene in Series 5 shows Laura finally confessing her feelings for Gordon and passionately kissing him, although this turns out to be Gordon fantasising. As a result of this, Laura is the only woman with whom Gordon has ever considered having an affair.

Laura is legally married to Michael T. Farrell III, the son of an American billionaire. However, she has been estranged from him for over two years and uses her maiden name, Lancing, in everyday life until he appears one day searching for her at the Centre. Despite the best efforts of a jealous Gordon, Laura gradually reconciles with Farrell again, and becomes pregnant with his child. Because of this, she turns down the opportunity to take over from Gordon as Manager of the Leisure Centre, and moves to Chicago, United States, to start a new life with Farrell at the end of Series 5.

== Colin Weatherby ==
Colin Weatherby
- First appearance: Series One, Episode One: "Laying the Foundations" (1991)
- Last appearance: Series Seven, Episode Eight: "Curse of the Tiger Women" (1997)
- Created by: Richard Fegen and Andrew Norriss
- Portrayed by: Mike Burns

In-universe information
- Occupation: Deputy Manager Wet, later Manager of Building Fabric
- Family: Stephanie (daughter)

Colin Weatherby is the Deputy Manager Wet and caretaker of the Centre.

Colin is a gentle, loyal and friendly character who is popular with all of his colleagues. However, he is also forgetful, disorganised, almost always late for staff meetings, highly incompetent and appears constantly disheveled and filthy. However, he is a skilled carpenter and engineer, and also has an impressive knowledge of biology, woodwork, construction, science, midwifery, plants, natural foods and healthy lifestyles. Despite this, he often suffers from unpleasant medical symptoms such as cuts, bruises, boils, and seborrhea. One of his hands is also septic and infected, and seen in a bandage throughout most of the series. As a result of this, whenever he shakes someone's hand, a dirty piece of bandage is left behind. Colin is accident-prone and frequently late or absent due to receiving medical attention for injuries he has sustained (and giving a disgusting explanation of this, despite Brittas telling him to be quiet). He hails from Sunderland and, like Julie, speaks with a strong northern English accent, in contrast to everyone else at the Centre.

Colin is the only member of staff who respects and reveres Brittas as a role model, and will not hear a word against him and will always defend him. However, while Brittas appreciates Colin's loyal nature, feels sympathetic towards him, admires his scientific and artistic knowledge, and is good friends with him (even going as far as to save his life by sucking spider venom out of Colin's buttocks), he is well aware throughout the series of Colin's incompetence as a manager and comes very close to firing him on several occasions. Brittas prefers working with the other deputies such as Laura or Gavin, rarely delegating jobs or responsibilities to Colin. Brittas also tries to keep Colin as hidden from the public as possible, afraid that he may present a bad image of the centre. Once, in Series 2 when Colin makes a stupid comment, Brittas is sarcastic and rude to Colin, upsetting him, so when Gavin goes to tell Brittas that something is gone wrong, Colin — along with Tim — goes to see how upset Brittas is. In Series 6, Brittas dismisses a herbal tonic that Colin makes, outraging him. An example of Colin's popularity among his colleagues is that whenever Gordon tries to sack Colin, the staff always protest.

From Series 1 to halfway through Series 5, Colin serves alongside fellow manager Laura as Deputy Manager Wet ("wet" referring to his swimming pool duties). Brittas then promotes Gavin to Acting Deputy Manager with the intention of sacking Colin due to his incompetence, but Laura eventually forces Brittas to "promote" Colin to "Manager of Building Fabric" — essentially a glorified janitor's position — and gives him a new uniform, a 2% pay rise, and an "office" in the basement. Colin is immensely happy with his new position and goes on to create many dangerous, crackpot inventions in the basement, ranging from waste recycling devices to Suffolk Punch-powered baby cradles.

Colin later clashes with Gavin after his promotion to acting deputy manager, out of jealousy. However, Brittas later reveals that Colin was never actually terminated as Deputy Manager Wet and is still technically Gavin's superior, much to Colin's delight and Gavin's chagrin.

In Series 4, it is revealed that Colin has an illegitimate daughter, Stephanie, who lives in Tasmania, Australia. Colin sends her lots of letters, telling her that he is the manager or that he has done something amazing. When Stephanie comes to stay, all the staff try to help Colin by talking about all the heroic acts he has done, or saying he is the manager. When Brittas finds out, he is enraged and incensed, but then does the best thing he ever does in the series: backing up Colin's stories. Colin also has a relationship with a milkwoman, Pauline (who, unbeknownst to Colin, is a male transvestite). Colin was once in a relationship with an Mrs. Edwina Harcourt, but it did not work out. In Series 6 and seven, hints are dropped at a possible romance between Colin and Julie. In the series 6 opener "Back with a Bang", Julie shows sympathy towards Colin when he is dumped by his girlfriend. Colin also threatens to attack anyone who insults Julie. He also comments how pretty Julie is and offers to marry her when he discovers she is pregnant. Although she refuses, she names him as the baby's godfather (and gives her son the middle name Colin), and often goes on strike upon discovering Colin could be sacked. In later series, when Laura leaves, Colin twice acts as Helen's supportive willing-to-listen friend: once when she confides in him about her marriage, and another time when she confides she suspects Gordon is having an affair with Carole.

== Carole Parkinson ==
Carole Parkinson
- First appearance: Series One, Episode One: "Laying the Foundations" (1991)
- Last appearance: Series Seven, Episode Eight: "Curse of the Tiger Women" (1997)
- Created by: Richard Fegen and Andrew Norriss
- Portrayed by: Harriet Thorpe

In-universe information
- Occupation: Receptionist, later Manager of the Creche
- Family: Derek Parkinson (husband); Ben (son); Emily Parkinson (daughter with Gordon Brittas); Jessica Parkinson (daughter with Gordon Brittas)

Carole Parkinson is the receptionist of the centre. She is a loving mother to her three children, whom she keeps in drawers and cupboards in the reception area where she also lives. Despite having ambitions to be a writer and pianist, Carole's talents remain unrecognised by the wider world. The beginning of the series sees Carole's husband leave her to live in Spain with her best friend. After Carole loses her job in the third series, a tactful suggestion from Laura leads Brittas to reclassify Carole as manager of the staff creche.

Brittas views Carole as hopeless and unattractive, on one occasion arranging the seating plan for an exclusive classical concert so that both she and Colin will be behind everyone else. Frequent references throughout the series are made to a fancy dress party hosted by Julie, at which Carole and Helen wore similar tiger costumes; this confusion results in the birth of Carole's twins in the leisure centre sauna. Although initially said to be a boy and a girl, later references suggest that the twins are girls named Jessica and Emily. Gordon is not informed that he is the twins' real father until the final episode.

At the end of Series 5, Carole finally finds happiness with an Austrian man named Von Trapp, who is employed by the Social Services department to investigate the report that she is keeping her children in drawers and cupboards. Carole's appearance in the unexpected sixth series is explained by Von Trapp's affair with a nun. A segment of the Christmas 1994 special, "In the Beginning", implied that Carole eventually left the centre to become a world-famous pianist.

== Gavin Featherly ==
Gavin Featherly
- First appearance: Series one, episode one: Laying the Foundations (1991)
- Last appearance: Series seven, episode eight: Curse of the Tiger Women (1997)
- Created by: Richard Fegen and Andrew Norriss
- Portrayed by: Tim Marriott

In-universe information
- Occupation: pool attendant, later Acting Deputy Manager
- Family: Tim Whistler (boyfriend); Peter Featherly (brother); Col. Featherley (father); Enid Featherley (mother); Sally (sister); Alice(sister)

Gavin Featherly (born c. 1961) is a pool attendant, and later Acting Deputy Manager of the Centre. His father is stated to be a retired army colonel, and his parents appear to live abroad; in Series 7, Episode 6 ("Gavin Featherly RIP"), they note that returning to England has involved a 22-hour flight. He is one of four children: his brother Peter lives in Zambia; his sister Sally lives in Tokyo; and another sister, Alice, lives in Brussels.

Gavin is gentle and caring, and gets on with his job under Brittas. He later develops a certain arrogance when being promoted to deputy manager. After this promotion, he occasionally clashes with the previous Deputy Manager Wet, Colin Weatherby, claiming he only "cleans toilets".

The promotion causes a rift in his relationship with boyfriend and co-worker Tim Whistler, and also causes him to pick up some of his boss's mannerisms, in the form of what he says and hand gestures. Gavin falls out with his boyfriend on many occasions, because of either keeping secrets from him or the jealousy and jumping to conclusions on Tim's part.

The relationship between Gavin and Tim provides a humorous subplot, because Brittas, who is unable to detect the subtle communication between the two, remains unaware they are a couple. In the last episode of the first series, Brittas even asks Gavin to keep on eye on Tim, because Brittas suspects that Tim is gay. In "Gavin Featherly RIP", Colonel and Mrs. Featherly remark that they do not ever remember Gavin talking about anyone called Tim, suggesting that they are unaware of their son's sexual orientation.

Gavin is the only staff member who wears a tie and blazer (after his promotion), just like Brittas, showing just how seriously he takes his career in leisure management. The Christmas 1994 special, "In the Beginning", shows that in later life, Gavin and Tim are still together, and he has become a Conservative MP.

== Linda Perkins ==
Linda Perkins
- First appearance: Series One, Episode One: "Laying the Foundations" (1991)
- Last appearance: Series Seven, Episode Eight: "The Curse of the Tiger Woman" (1997)
- Created by: Richard Fegen and Andrew Norriss
- Portrayed by: Jill Greenacre

In-universe information
- Occupation: pool attendant

Linda Perkins (played by Jill Greenacre) is a pool attendant at the Centre, teaching and training people in different sports.

Enthusiastic and hard-working, Linda has a deep admiration for Brittas and is willing to fulfil whatever strange or illogical tasks she is given. She has a keen awareness of ethical issues, to the point where a conflict of opinions with Tim over his planned in-centre menu results in Linda and a group of environmentally minded friends staging an animal rights protest outside, where Tim is shut inside a small cage to prove her point. Her cheerful nature may explain why she is chosen to staff the reception desk during Carole's assertiveness training.

Linda has a brother who works in a tropical disease centre at Birmingham and is knowledgeable about poisonous plants and spiders, and they want to go to Oregon to start up a gun shop there. Linda also says she has a sister in one episode. She met her long-term partner Edward at school and brings him to a social event at the centre on one occasion; he is considerably older than Linda, leading her to admit that he was her headmaster.

Linda is drawn to the spiritual life, stating that her ambition is to become the first female Archbishop of Canterbury. At the time of Brittas' planned departure for Brussels, Linda had been offered a place at theological college and the Christmas 1994 special, "In the Beginning", implied that she did go on to become a senior member of the clergy.

== Tim Whistler ==
Tim Whistler
- First appearance: Series One, Episode One: "Laying the Foundations" (1991)
- Last appearance: Series Seven, Episode Eight: "The Curse of the Tiger Woman" (1997)
- Created by: Richard Fegen and Andrew Norriss
- Portrayed by: Russell Porter

In-universe information
- Occupation: pool attendant, chef
- Family: Gavin Featherly (boyfriend)

Tim Whistler (played by Russell Porter) is a pool attendant and chef. Tim is bisexual and, unbeknown to Gordon Brittas, in a relationship with fellow pool attendant Gavin Featherly, with whom he shares an apartment. Like most of his colleagues, Tim despises his manager, Brittas, and often complains or schemes to disrupt the centre to get at him through strikes and protests.

Although a lively, confident worker, Tim is slightly mentally troubled and has regular appointments with psychiatrists. He has mood swings, becomes jealous over Gavin, and cannot endure Gavin's noticing anyone but him. His unbalanced, emotional persona makes their relationship increasingly strained as the series progresses and causes a further rift between them when Gavin becomes a deputy manager. Tim and Gavin stay together despite this tension, but Tim occasionally snipes at Gavin and resents his sucking up to Brittas.

Although Tim has few apparent aspirations within the leisure centre, he briefly gets excited at the prospect of becoming a deputy manager when Brittas leaves for a new job of European Sports Commissioner in Brussels. However, this fails to eventuate after Brittas is almost "killed" at the end of Series Five. Tim continues as a pool attendant, unaware he is earning the lowest wage in the centre. He eventually learns this and revolts, holding Gavin, Linda and Colin hostage in the staff room.

It later emerges that Tim's real birth name is Timothy Göebbels, that he was born in East Germany and illegally changed his name from "Göebbels" to "Whistler" out of shame. Gordon refuses to recognise Tim as a legal entity after this revelation and opens up a vacancy for Tim's position, allowing Tim to re-apply to the centre only by using his real name. However, Tim finally receives a large pay rise afterwards, when Brittas categorises him as an imported "EU acquisition" because of his German nationality.

In later series, Tim puts his chef skills to use when he volunteers to run the staff canteen, with a view of running it full time in the future. The Christmas 1994 special "In the Beginning" shows that in later life, Tim and Gavin are still together, and he has become a famous author and television chef.

== Julie Porter (Series 2–7) ==
Julie Porter
- First appearance: Series Two, Episode One: "Back from the Dead" (1992)
- Last appearance: Series Seven, Episode Eight: "The Curse of the Tiger Woman" (1997)
- Portrayed by: Judy Flynn

In-universe information
- Occupation: Secretary
- Family: Kath Fazakerley (sister)
- Children: Gordon Porter
- Relatives: Melanie Fazakerley (niece); Roger Fazakerley (brother-in-law)

Julie Porter replaced Angie as Brittas's secretary from the beginning of Series 2. Originally from Rotherham, Julie has a distinctive strong Yorkshire accent and fiery personality. An outspoken and insubordinate character, she often flatly refuses menial tasks assigned by Gordon. During collective staff action against Brittas, such as strikes or protests, Julie joins in with great enthusiasm, often being the instigator. She dislikes Brittas more than any of her colleagues (except possibly Tim), and genuinely hopes he will be replaced by someone more capable, although Brittas himself remains oblivious to the fact. Julie has a sister, Kath, who is married to Roger Fazakerley; the couple are the parents of Julie's niece Melanie.

It is implied that Julie occasionally accepts casual work outside the leisure centre; she meets Alexander "Alex" Cholmondeley-Hulme (a baronet, and owner of a brewery) at the Young Conservatives Ball, where the two have a brief relationship that results in pregnancy. Her baby son is born unexpectedly in Colin's office, whilst attempting to help Helen stage a burglary at the leisure centre, and is named Gordon Colin, owing to both Brittas and his Deputy Manager being present at the birth. Julie later continues her relationship with Alex.

== Recurring characters in the series ==
=== Angie (Series 1) ===
Angie (played by Andrée Bernard) is Brittas's first secretary when the centre opens, and appears throughout the first series.

Angie is a caring and relatively calm character who is very similar in personality to Laura. Despite her obedient nature, she does portray a nastier, more reactionary streak at times, similar to her later replacement, Julie. She is good friends with Carole and is often seen lending her support through her emotionally dark times. Angie also defends Carole against criticism from Brittas, even going so far as to tip three cups of coffee on the reception floor in protest.

Angie appears very similar to Julie — both have blonde hair and wear classy female office clothes. However, Julie has a far more blunt and aggressive nature than Angie. Julie appears from Series 2 onwards, and Angie's disappearance and replacement is never actually explained in any episodes.

=== Pam Shields (Series 1) ===
Pam, played by actress Frances Low, is Helen and Gordon's new neighbour. In Series 1, Pam is Helen's friend, a minor character Helen can talk to. She is used to reveal Gordon's character: Helen describes Gordon to Pam, including the chaos he caused in previous jobs.

In Series 2, Pam is replaced as Helen's supportive, glad-to-listen friend, by Laura (who has a more distant relationship with Helen in the first series). Pam does not appear in any further series because she was no longer needed.

=== Councillor Daphne Dapping (Series 1 and 2) ===
Councillor Dapping is portrayed by actress Jo Kendall, and is the character responsible for putting Brittas in charge of the Centre. In the first episode, when within minutes of arrival, Brittas is already upsetting staff and causing strikes, Dapping quickly regrets who she has put in charge.

Councillor Dapping only appears in the very first episode and also the Series 2 episode "Safety First"; in the latter, she falls from a fire escape and injures herself, and is replaced by the harsher Councillor Drugett.

=== Councillor Jack Druggett (Series 4-7) ===
Stephen Churchett played Councillor Druggett, a more determined character to remove Brittas than Councillor Dapping was. Druggett first appears at the end of Series 4, in the episode "The Chop". He succeeds in sacking Brittas as Manager of the Leisure Centre, and also sacks Carole as receptionist after seeing her children kept in office drawers. However, in the following episode, Brittas once again inadvertently manages to burn down the building, but in the process, he saves three children. He is crowned a local hero and with the backing from the press, he returns to manage the newly rebuilt centre in Series 5.

Druggett's second attempt to remove Brittas then comes at the beginning of Series 5, when he leaves a newspaper in the centre for Brittas, advertising a job in Brussels, the capital city of Belgium. Although Brittas accepts this, he is crushed by a falling water tank, and thus his career move to Belgium is ended. Brittas is then taken to hospital and recovers. Druggett tries on several occasions after this to remove Brittas from management, such as in "Wake Up The Lion Within", where he conspires with Carole to allow her to replace Brittas as manager. However, all of these attempts fail.

Druggett's final appearance is in the last ever episode, where he dies after eating gypsy-cursed biscuits that Brittas has cooked.

=== Horatio Brittas (Series 3 and 4) ===
The Reverend Horatio Brittas (played by Richard Braine) is the twin brother of Gordon, mentioned in Series 2. Their father (Robin Parkinson) is still alive. He shares the same "dream" for world peace and social unity that Gordon does, and it is revealed that as children, the two brothers came to an agreement: for Gordon to fulfil the physical part of the dream, while Horatio took care of the spiritual part, as a vicar.

Horatio is a gentle character, and in terms of his voice and mannerisms, appears very similar to Gordon. Like Gordon, while trying to do the right thing, he unintentionally brings chaos and destruction into the lives of those around him. However, unlike Gordon, during the third series he has a crisis of faith when he realises that his spiritual and peacekeeping interventions have been mostly unsuccessful, and lacks Gordon's unbreakable motivation and self-confidence. This proves a problem to him as whilst he is staying with Gordon and a pregnant Helen for four months, he is considering whether or not to be a missionary in Lebanon; however, at the end of the episode, Gordon rallies him and Horatio strongly decides to go to Lebanon. Horatio is also said to be a schoolteacher of Religious Studies.

Horatio returns to the centre early in Series 4 to baptise Gordon's five young children. Unfortunately, however, Horatio brings his future wife, Philippa Bellmont, who turns out to have a similar personality to that of Gordon. She annoys Gordon intensely and gets into a fight with Helen, which disrupts the proceedings.

=== Jim Brittas (Series 2) ===
Jim Brittas (Robin Parkinson) is the father of Gordon and Horatio, and appears to have a good relationship with Gordon. His only appearance in the series comes when he delivers a piano to the centre in preparation for a concert. Unable to realise his own dream of becoming an astronomer, Jim was employed as a night watchman but was keen that his children should achieve their ambitions, and it is implied that he readily praised his sons' achievements, explaining why Gordon has developed absolute confidence in his own questionable abilities.

Jim is shown to be very fond of his daughter-in-law Helen, complimenting the care she has taken over her appearance when Gordon completely fails to notice.

=== Michael T. Farrell III (Series 3-5) ===
David Crean portrays Laura's handsome, billionaire but deceptive husband Michael. Hailing from America, Michael first shows up at the centre in an attempt to win Laura back, which fails. However, his second attempt in the next series succeeds, but he continues to be deceitful. Nevertheless, it seems he genuinely loves Laura in Series 5, willing to start work at the sports centre to try and please her. But when Laura falls pregnant, he instead decides he wants the baby to be brought up in America, to which Laura agrees. An episode set in the future reveals that they name their son Barney.

Brittas hates Farrell, seeing him nothing more than a liar and a cheat. In Series 4, Farrell turns up for the staff ball, thus preventing Brittas from taking Laura as his dancing partner, making Brittas particularly bitter.

=== Penny Bidmead (Series 6) ===
Penny is portrayed by actress Anouschka Menzies. She is introduced in Series 6 and operates the centre's "newly privatised" sauna beauty department.

Penny's role was to replace Laura. She is an attractive blonde, with an air of arrogance about her, which leads to her frequently clashing with other members of staff, including Brittas. However, she does get on well with Helen, and seems to take over Laura's role of Helen's supportive friend. All of the staff treat her with hostility. However, Penny was removed for the final series, apparently due to the actress having other filming commitments.

Character	First appearance	Last appearance	Episode count
Gordon Brittas	"Laying the Foundations"	"Curse of the Tiger Women"	53
Helen Brittas	"Laying the Foundations"	"Curse of the Tiger Women"	52
Laura Lancing	"Laying the Foundations"	"In the Beginning"	37
Colin Weatherby	"Laying the Foundations"	"Curse of the Tiger Women"	53
Carole Parkinson	"Laying the Foundations"	"Curse of the Tiger Women"	53
Gavin Featherly	"Laying the Foundations"	"Curse of the Tiger Women"	53
Linda Perkin	"Laying the Foundations"	"Curse of the Tiger Women"	51
Tim Whistler	"Laying the Foundations"	"Curse of the Tiger Women"	53
Julie Porter	"Back from the Dead"	"Curse of the Tiger Women"	46
Angie	"Laying the Foundations"	"Assassin"	6
Pam	"Laying the Foundations"	"Underwater Wedding"	3
Councillor Dapping	"Laying the Foundations"	"Safety First"	2
Councillor Druggett	"The Chop"	"Curse of the Tiger Women"	8
Horatio Brittas	"Two Little Boys"	"The Christening"	2
Michael T. Farrell III	"Sex, Lies and Red Tape"	"The Lies Have It"	3
Penny Bidmead	"Back with a Bang"	"Snap Happy"	7
