= Get Fit with Brittas =

- Genre: Comedy; Health; Education
- Directed by: John Kilby
- Starring: Chris Barrie; Leslie Ash; Kriss Akabusi; Mike Burns; Suzanne Charlton; Judy Flynn; Pippa Haywood; Lesley Joseph; Nicholas Parsons; Mark Porter; June Whitfield
- Country of origin: United Kingdom
- Original language: English
- No. of series: 1
- No. of episodes: 6

Production
- Executive producer: Tony Moss
- Producer: Paul Reizin
- Running time: 10 mins

Original release
- Network: BBC1
- Release: 18 July – 22 August 1997

Related
- The Brittas Empire

Get Fit with Brittas is a series of six 10-minute-long episodes which aired between 18 July and 22 August 1997 on BBC1. Starring Chris Barrie as Gordon Brittas from the BBC Sitcom The Brittas Empire, it aimed to educate the audience on matters of public health and keeping fit. The series aimed to promote a healthier lifestyle by encouraging viewers to engage in various activities, regardless of their fitness levels. All episodes aired on Friday evenings at 20:50 on BBC1. There was also a tie-in book released which offered more advice on information on how to get moving. Unlike the regular series, Get Fit With Brittas was never released on VHS or DVD.

== Episodes ==
No.	Title	Directed by	Original release date
1	"Doctor's Orders"	John Kilby	18 July 1997
Gordon resolves to walk everywhere after Radio Times doctor Mark Porter advises him to take more exercise. On his travels he meets BBC Weather forecaster Suzanne Charlton who talks about her love of golf.
2	"The Great Outdoors"	John Kilby	25 July 1997
Gordon and Colin bump into actress Leslie Ash who discusses the joy of cycling.
3	"Gordon Clocks It Up"	John Kilby	1 August 1997
Nicholas Parsons reveals how he defies the ageing process by gardening.
4	"Gordon Works It Out"	John Kilby	8 August 1997
Gordon learns all about aerobics from Birds of a Feather star Lesley Joseph and gets some more health advice from Radio Times doctor Mark Porter.
5	"A Question of Sport"	John Kilby	15 August 1997
Gordon learns about the joys of tennis from television presenter and former athlete Kriss Akabusi.
6	"Glad All Over"	John Kilby	22 August 1997
When Gordon meets actress June Whitfield, who explains how activity cheers her up, he discovers that one secret of happiness is exercise.
