= List of The Brittas Empire episodes =

This is a list of episodes, with synopses and airdates, of the British sitcom The Brittas Empire. It stars Chris Barrie as Gordon Brittas, the well-meaning but incompetent manager of a leisure centre in Southern England. It first aired between 1991 and 1997 on BBC1. It was created by Richard Fegen and Andrew Norriss, who together co-wrote the first five series (1991–1996). A total of seven series and 52 episodes were created, including two Christmas specials (1994 and 1996) and two short sketches for Children In Need (in 1995 and 1996 respectively). Most of the main characters are in all episodes, but Laura is only in the first five series. Helen Brittas is in all but one episode (in series four); Linda does not appear in two episodes of the first series. Angie is only in series one, and her replacement is Julie, played by Judy Flynn, who is in all episodes from series two onwards, except for the 1996 Christmas special.

The cast appeared all in character for the Royal Variety Performance of 1996, and the success of the series has resulted in it being released on VHS and DVD by 2 Entertain, BBC Warner, and Eureka Video throughout the 1990s and 2000s. An audiobook, read by Barrie as Brittas, was also released.

== Episodes ==
=== Series 1 (1991) ===
All episodes were filmed and produced in 1990 and broadcast on BBC1 Thursdays at 19:00.

No. overall	No. in series	Title	Directed by	Written by	Original release date
1	1	"Laying the Foundations"	Mike Stephens	Andrew Norriss and Richard Fegen	3 January 1991
Gordon Brittas arrives at Whitbury New Town Leisure Centre to find enthusiastic staff, but receptionist Carole is depressed. She gave birth three weeks ago and her husband left her for her best friend. Within minutes of arrival, Brittas brings along some very complicated rotas, which he refuses to change, upsetting the staff - one of whom tries to drop a table tennis table onto him. In response to Brittas' condescending attitude, the cleaner walks away. The builders react to Brittas by going on strike and pouring concrete into his car. Councillor Dapping soon regrets the council appointing Brittas as manager of the new leisure centre.
2	2	"The Opening Day"	Mike Stephens	Andrew Norriss and Richard Fegen	10 January 1991
The Duchess of Kent is to visit the centre on its first day open to the public. Brittas is determined for the day to run smoothly, but his wife Helen tries to warn Laura that disaster is guaranteed wherever her husband is. Helen is proven right when Brittas upsets the builders, causing them to abandon a leaking pool that soon floods into the boiler room; the heaters go into overdrive, the faulty automatic doors will not open, and Laura's friend Michael is electrocuted.
3	3	"Bye Bye Baby" (Note: This is one of the two episodes the character "Linda" does not appear in.)	Mike Stephens	Andrew Norriss and Richard Fegen	24 January 1991
Carole's husband, who moved to Spain with his mistress, visits the centre to reunite with her. However, a misunderstanding involving a baby leads to him deciding not to return to her. Brittas' pedantry causes queues and complications in reception and drives to breaking point the guest speaker, who has arrived to give a talk on how to cope with stress.
4	4	"Underwater Wedding"	Mike Stephens	Andrew Norriss and Richard Fegen	31 January 1991
An underwater wedding is being held inside the centre, but the best man's finger is stuck in a grate at the bottom of the pool. Also, a drunk disabled man is on the loose in his electric wheelchair, and Brittas executes a plan involving cardboard boxes to catch him, which leads to Colin shooting Gavin with a harpoon gun and chlorine gas leaking throughout the building. Witness to the madness is 17-year-old jobseeker Beverley.
5	5	"Stop Thief!"	Mike Stephens	Andrew Norriss and Richard Fegen	7 February 1991
Brittas is convinced there is a thief amongst the staff, so he employs a series of methods to discover the culprit. After Simon ends their affair, Helen is desperate for more pills. However, the new doctor insists on meeting the cause of her depression – her husband – before giving her a prescription. After meeting Brittas, the doctor does not hesitate.
6	6	"Assassin"	Mike Stephens	Andrew Norriss and Richard Fegen	14 February 1991
Someone is out to kill Brittas, injuring Helen by accident after sabotaging Brittas' brakes, and wants Gavin to help him with the foul deed. Brittas and a few other people are taken to the hospital's intensive care unit, badly injured by a lorry hitting Brittas as he walked across a zebra crossing.

=== Series 2 (1992) ===
All episodes were filmed and produced in 1991 and broadcast on BBC1 Thursdays at 20:30.

No. overall	No. in series	Title	Original release date
7	1	"Back from the Dead"	2 January 1992
The centre is quiet until it becomes known that Brittas is in Bulgaria, whereupon it becomes very busy. Helen arrives and informs the staff that Brittas was accidentally crushed to death in a steel press in Bulgaria. However, as the staff and Helen prepare for an easier life without him, the staff are all horrified when he walks through the centre's doors eight days after he left. He tells them that he was shut in a chicken coop. Still believing him to be dead, Helen prepares for her wedding. Carole faints in shock, and after a talk with Colin, believes Brittas is a zombie who wants her baby to gain eternal youth. This misunderstanding leads to Carole to crush Brittas' car using an excavator whilst he is inside it.
8	2	"Temple of the Body"	9 January 1992 (10.06 million viewers)
Brittas is horrified to discover women's underwear in his office and is convinced that a staff member is using the facilities to have sex. He segregates the sexes and bugs Linda; the evidence gathered leads him to Gavin, whom Brittas is unaware is in a same-sex relationship with Tim. The real culprit is Helen, who discovers that Brittas had sex with Carole at a fancy dress party, wrongly assuming her to have been Helen, because they were both wearing tiger costumes. Julie is being hounded by reporters for rescuing a dog from a river whilst topless.
9	3	"An Inspector Calls"	16 January 1992
Brittas fears for his job when the Southern Area Inspector visits, fully aware that visiting figures are poor. Colin accidentally causes a pigeon to roost in the gymnasium, leading to a chain of chaotic trivialities that threaten the inspection. Meanwhile, insulted by a badly chosen birthday gift (a moped with a yellow helmet reading "Hi I'm Helen"), Helen decides to leave Brittas.
10	4	"Set in Concrete"	23 January 1992
An extreme argument with the Rotary Club results in them setting Brittas' feet in concrete. After frequent arguments break out, Brittas think the centre has sick building syndrome. A specialist arrives, and Laura is tasked with explaining to Brittas that he is the cause of the centre's problems. Laura proceeds to explain subtext and tone of voice to Brittas, after which he decides to return the moped bought for Helen and buy her a car instead, to her delight. A stonemason arrives to remove the concrete using a chisel.
11	5	"Mums and Dads"	30 January 1992
The centre is preparing for a concert by Vladimir Petrov, a visiting pianist from the Leningrad Conservatory. Brittas' father Jim visits, telling Laura that he has always told Brittas that he has great ability and can achieve anything. Jim brings Brittas' late mother's piano, which accidentally breaks free and knocks the pianist unconscious. Brittas performs the concert himself, despite lacking musical ability.
12	6	"Safety First"	13 February 1992
Brittas closes the centre for a series of fire drill exercises, while trying to convince Councillor Dapping to install a new fire escape. Helen prepares a special lunch in Brittas' office to help save their marriage and even intends to give up the pills necessary to cope with him. Later, she accidentally starts a fire. The fire escape, which is designed to take eight people, collapses with 14 people on it.
13	7	"New Generations"	20 February 1992
A pregnant cow loose in the centre eats some of Colin's leaves, which speed up labour; she gives birth on the squash courts, assisted by a gynaecologist. Carole has also eaten some of the leaves, and her twins are delivered by the vet who had come to assist the bovine mother-to-be. Helen tells Laura that she is pregnant with twins and that Brittas is the father of Carole's twins.

=== Series 3 (1993) ===
All episodes were filmed and produced in 1992 and broadcast on BBC1 Thursdays at 20:30.

No.	Title	Original airdate
1	"The Trial"	7 January 1993
One of Brittas' enemies is coating random items with glue, and shady characters repeatedly appear in the centre. This leads to a massacre of several Bolivian drug dealers in the squash courts, the felling of several OAPs, and Brittas facing trial for drug running and multiple murders. After one of the criminals present at the time gives evidence at court, Brittas is acquitted.
2	"That Creeping Feeling"	14 January 1993
Offended by Brittas' "individual figure and fitness targets", the staff refuse to speak to him; his diplomatic response is it bring in a psychiatrist to check staff anxiety levels. The psychiatrist tells Brittas that he is the cause of his staff's stress. A deadly tropical spider bites Colin. Brittas sucks out the poison and Colin recovers.
3	"Laura's Leaving"	21 January 1993
While Brittas prepares to welcome Sebastian Coe to the "Expansion in the Leisure Market" conference, Laura is attending a job interview for manager of a leisure centre in London. Helen is terrified that without Laura, the centre will be unable to cope. Laura is offered the job, but decides to stay at Whitbury. A concussed Colin is sent to adjust the heating in the pool, leading to the electrocution of the pool users. Carole has moved her children back into the reception drawers.
4	"Two Little Boys"	28 January 1993
Gordon's brother, Reverend Horatio Brittas, visits for the centre's anniversary celebrations, and 36 staff from a Guildford leisure centre visit for their annual staff outing. As usual, things go badly wrong: the centre's oil tank begins to leak and the leaked oil is brought inside and stored in the weights room to keep it from being struck by lightning, and a firework is accidentally set off in Brittas' office and streaks along the corridor to the weights room, resulting in a large explosion and fire.
5	"Sex, Lies and Red Tape"	4 February 1993
Laura's estranged husband, Michael T. Farrell, arrives at the centre two and a half years after the couple split up. He wants her to have his child, because being a father is a condition of his inheriting his family's fortune. Brittas is unhappy and endeavours to get rid of him, despite being on a sponsored silence. He is horrified to learn that Helen is about to be charged with shoplifting and that she had been convicted of the same crime several times before she met him. The staff are interested in the draft of a novel that Carole has written.
6	"The Stuff of Dreams"	11 February 1993
Troubled by dreams about his own mortality and the future of "The Dream", Brittas is pushing age awareness and disguises himself as an elderly man as an experiment. The result is a fight in reception, during which Brittas breaks a pensioner's glasses. Helen, pregnant with twins, goes into labour early and needs to be rushed to the hospital. She had wanted Laura to drive her, but Brittas is behind the wheel. After the man whom Brittas fought accidentally drives into Brittas' car at low speed, medical students deliver the twin boys in Whitbury High Street.

=== Series 4 (1994) ===
All episodes were filmed and produced in 1993 and broadcast on BBC1 Mondays at 20:30.

No.	Title	Original airdate
1	"Not A Good Day"	10 January 1994
It is Life Cycle Week at the centre, and Sebastian Coe has come to help promote the event. Unfortunately, confusion involving a troublesome child leads to Colin mistakenly chaining Coe to a railing and the centre being attacked by a Roman recreational society. Carole's son Ben escapes from his cupboard.
2	"The Christening"	17 January 1994
On the Brittas twins' christening day, Helen has misplaced them somewhere in town. Brittas' brother Horatio arrives with an unpleasant fiancée who enjoys speaking her mind, and neither Helen nor Brittas get along with her.
3	"Biggles Tells a Lie"	24 January 1994
To impress his daughter Stephanie, whom he has never met, Colin pretends to be manager of the centre and to have major achievements. She visits from Hobart, Tasmania, Australia, while Brittas takes the day off. The staff, who were previously unaware of her existence, help him to keep up the pretence that he is what he claims to be. Brittas unexpectedly turns up, and despite disagreeing with Colin's deception, does not reveal the truth to Stephanie. A pornographic magazine featuring an explicit photo of Helen is found, which she prevents Brittas from seeing.
4	"Mr. Brittas Changes Trains"	31 January 1994
Brittas is to attend an important dinner meeting but Helen, knowing it will be a disaster that she too will need to attend, develops lockjaw. After a staff visit to a hypnosis show, certain staff members show erratic behaviour (Colin tells people he loves them whenever he hears the word "need"; Linda barks instead of speaking). When the hypnotist arrives to solve the problem, Brittas is accidentally hypnotised, making him a much better person - until its effects wear off at midnight.
5	"Playing with Fire"	7 February 1994
Helen and the children have gone on holiday, leaving Brittas home alone. Gavin's former girlfriend Jennifer returns, intent on reconciling, which causes a rift in his relationship with Tim, but then they discover that Jen has escaped from a mental institution with a case of explosives. To participate in Energy Saving Week, Colin has created a generator powered by the centre's "waste material"; Jen attaches Brittas to the generator and he is electrocuted.
6	"Shall We Dance?"	14 February 1994
Helen is still away, and as Brittas and Laura grow closer, the staff spread rumours that they are having an affair; even more so when he announces he will be taking Laura to the annual staff dance. Her ex-husband Michael Farrell visits, desperate to reunite with her. Carole has invited her first boyfriend to the dance, who is intent on proposing marriage.
7	"The Chop"	28 February 1994(9.0 million viewers)
Councillor Druggett arrives in another attempt to sack Brittas as manager of the centre. £300 is missing from petty cash, which Helen borrowed to buy a dog and items for it. Druggett gives Brittas an ultimatum: either he accepts responsibility for mismanaging the centre and resigns, or his wife will be prosecuted. Helen has previous convictions and, fearing being imprisoned, she hides in the dog kennel. Brittas replaces the money, claiming he had taken it, and resigns.
8	"High Noon"	7 March 1994 (7.56 million viewers)
With a replacement manager for Brittas, the centre is busier than ever. But the new manager is untidy, disorganised, and apathetic, much to Brittas' disappointment. However, even as a visitor to the centre, Brittas still manages to cause chaos: an accident involving a gas leak and a faulty clock causes an explosion and fire. After the centre is destroyed, Brittas is regarded as a hero. He is awarded a George Medal and offered his old job back.

=== Series 5 (1994) ===
All episodes were filmed and produced in 1994 and broadcast on BBC1 Mondays at 20:30.

No.	Title	Original airdate
1	"The Old, Old Story"	31 October 1994
Religious television series Songs of Praise visits the newly rebuilt centre for a live recording. But with Brittas back managing the centre, now crowned local hero after his heroic rescue of three children from the previous centre's fire, chaos soon resumes and an emu roams loose in the centre. Meanwhile, Counsellor Druggett is still intent on getting rid of Brittas, and an attractive new job in Brussels might make this possible.
2	"Blind Devotion"	7 November 1994
Brittas tells Laura that he is going to sack Colin due to Colin's ineptitude. Colin arrives having been temporarily blinded in an accident. His great aunt, who raised him after his parents died, has died, and all of his money has been stolen by a man who has recently fled to Rio de Janeiro. The toilets are leaking gallons of human excrement. After Colin identifies and solves the problem, Brittas decides against firing him. Helen does not want to leave for Brittas' new job in Brussels.
3	"Brussels Calling"	14 November 1994
Brittas visits Brussels in relation to the job he was offered, so things should be running smoothly at the centre. However, even hundreds of miles away, he still manages to cause a chain of problems involving rats and explosions. Helen is in trouble after trying to kill a teacher.
4	"The Lies Have It"	21 November 1994
Attempting to cover up Helen's affair, Laura's husband Michael uses Carole's birthday as an alibi, but the story becomes more complicated and contradictory throughout the day, and Brittas assumes that Michael is having an affair. Laura and Michael are pleased about her pregnancy. Tim is angry to discover that Gavin has been taking management courses.
5	"The Boss"	28 November 1994
Brittas appoints Gavin to the position of manager for the day, faking a series of catastrophes to challenge Gavin's managerial skills. Helen has a recent tattoo altered. Carole's wealthy old gentleman friend arrives at the centre, where he is killed when a weightlifting weight is accidentally dropped on his head.
6	"Pregnant"	5 December 1994
Confusion plagues the centre when Brittas claims that urine tests prove that 17 of the staff are pregnant, including Carole, Linda, a woman who has had a hysterectomy, three who are in their 70s, and Tim. Julie is being unusually nice to Brittas. Carole thinks she is pregnant by Colin, so plans are made for them to marry. Julie admits that she dropped the samples and replaced them with her own urine. Helen tells Laura that she and her children are not going to Brussels and will move into her rich lover's house as Brittas moves to Brussels alone.
7	"UXB"	12 December 1994
Colin finds an unexploded World War II bomb that is liable to explode. Brittas prepares to leave for his job in Brussels, to which Helen immediately warms upon seeing the luxurious lifestyle they will have. Carol, Julie, and Linda are given chances for happiness; and Laura announces her pregnancy and her plans to move to America with her husband, meaning that Gavin, and consequently Tim, are to ascend to the vacant management positions. Just as a happy ending is in sight for all of the centre's staff, Brittas gets cold feet.
8	"The Last Day"	19 December 1994
Brittas's cold feet continues on his final day, particularly after Germany reduces its financial contribution to European Union funding. Carole tells Laura that she had her cupboard at work that she keeps her children in extended back to create a room, which Laura realises has been done by removing a supporting wall of the centre. A newly installed water tank is overfilled and starts falling through the centre's floors. Carole is stuck in Ben's miniature car in reception - the tank's final destination. Brittas saves Carole at the last moment by pushing her out of the tank's path, seemingly being killed when it falls on him. He ascends to heaven, but is sent back to earth. Just after he is lowered into the ground in his coffin, he knocks on the inside of it and speaks.

=== Christmas special (1994) ===
Title	Original airdate
"In the Beginning"	27 December 1994
Set on New Year's Eve 2019, Laura lives in Chicago and has a twentysomething son, Linda is a vicar and Gavin is running for election as a Conservative MP. The old staff of the centre prepare to reunite again for their usual end-of-year celebrations. The audience are taken back to the early weeks of the centre's existence in December 1989 and January 1990, when the staff are snowed in. As a result, they are forced to spend Christmas and New Year in the centre with limited food and heating.

=== Series 6 (1996) ===
Episodes were broadcast on BBC1 Tuesdays at 20:30.

No.	Title	Original airdate
1	"Back With A Bang"	27 February 1996
After extensive surgery in Switzerland following his accident, Brittas returns to Whitbury New Town Leisure Centre. Meanwhile, Carole is back behind reception after her hopes of happiness are dashed yet again; Gavin pays special attention to attractive new staff member Penny, making Tim jealous; and Helen has escaped from her mental hospital and spent all the life insurance money she received after Gordon's death.
2	"Body Language"	12 March 1996
After a large block of ice mysteriously crashes through the roof, events make Colin believe that aliens have taken over the Centre. Meanwhile, Carole's son Ben has a birthday party in his cupboard; and Helen moves all her household goods into the Centre after accidentally selling her and Gordon's house.
3	"At the Double"	26 March 1996
One member of a circus troupe that arrives at the Centre is a duplicate of Brittas, causing confusion.
4	"A Walk on the Wild Side"	2 April 1996
Brittas believes that a private right-of-way goes through the Centre; Helen realises that she has two husbands; an outbreak of lethal diseases causes chaos. Meanwhile, a man who claims that he is the "Face in The Crowd" causes trouble by stealing a signboard concerning the aforesaid topic.
5	"We All Fall Down"	9 April 1996
During "Peace and Hunger" week at the Centre, Tim, outraged to discover that he gets paid less than everyone else, holds the staff hostage in the rest room until Brittas meets his demands.
6	"Mr. Brittas Falls in Love"	16 April 1996
Brittas organises a "Dolphin Day" at the Centre, but a baby tiger shark is delivered there instead; a teenage girl arrives for two weeks of work experience, and the staff believe she has been eaten by the shark; opposed to the use of animals for personal amusement, Linda forms a protest rally outside the Centre.
7	"Snap Happy"	23 April 1996
The staff prepare for a photograph, but a chain of trivialities delays the event; heights-hater Helen participates in a parachute jump that goes horribly wrong.

=== Christmas special (1996) ===
No.	Title	Original airdate
Special	"Surviving Christmas"	24 December 1996
The staff unwillingly go on a Survival and Fitness trip with a vengeful actor on their trail. Meanwhile, a furious Helen believes Gordon is having an affair with Carole.

=== Series 7 (1997) ===
Episodes were broadcast on BBC1 Mondays at 20:30.

No.	Title	Original airdate
1	"The Elephants' Child"	6 January 1997
Julie goes into labour, Colin has a large amount of manure delivered to the centre, and a bungee jump is prepared; Gavin and Tim are both scared of heights, but even more scared of each other knowing this.
2	"Reviewing the Situation"	13 January 1997 (9.62 million viewers)
Julie hires a personal bodyguard after receiving death threats. Brittas labels Tim non-existent, and when Tim presents his birth certificate, it is revealed that he is not who he seems to be.
3	"http://etc" (Note: This is not a website link, this is the title of the episode.)	20 January 1997
Everything in the centre is computerised, and the staff now feel the computer has taken over their jobs; to convince Brittas to scrap the system, they attempt to sabotage it.
4	"Wake Up the Lion Within"	27 January 1997
Carole uses Brittas' "waking up the lion within" technique to spawn an alter-ego that commands her to take control of the centre using any means necessary.
5	"The Disappearing Act"	3 February 1997
Julie's niece goes missing after Colin supposedly makes her disappear during a magic trick at her birthday party, held at the centre. Meanwhile, Helen hosts a dreams workshop.
6	"Gavin Featherly R.I.P."	10 February 1997
After a staff holiday trip to Burbage-on-Sea (where Brittas and the staff went the previous year and the year before that), evidence mounts up to suggest that a troubled Gavin has committed suicide. Funeral preparations are made at the centre, until Tim receives a call from Gavin, who claims he was abducted by pirates.
7	"Exposed"	17 February 1997
Brittas prepares for a television documentary recording at the Centre and hires a model to stand in for Colin. However, a lethal disease breaks out.
8	"Curse of the Tiger Women"	24 February 1997
The staff celebrate the anniversary of the centre with a cake that Brittas made. Due to a gypsy curse placed upon him, everyone who has a piece dies shortly after eating it. Julie contemplates marriage, there is a build-up of marsh gas in the centre, and Carole makes a devastating discovery. After being pecked unconscious by a bird, Brittas wakes up on a train, with his wife, to find that him managing the centre was all a dream, and he is actually on his way to his job interview.

- 5.30 million viewers on May 3, 1994
