= Iris Gower =

Welsh novelist

Iris Davies (1935 – 20 July 2010), pen name Iris Gower, was a British novelist from Swansea, Wales, noted for historical romances. They are set mainly in the seaport of Swansea and adjacent Gower Peninsula, from which she took her pseudonym.

== Biography ==
Iris Richardson was born in 1935 in Swansea, the sister of Billy, Jean, John and Christine. Her family lived in Swansea city centre, but afterwards moved to Mayhill, where Iris met pattern-maker, William Tudor Davies. She and Davies married on Iris's 21st birthday. They settled in Manselton, Swansea and had four children: Tudor Jr, Angela, Susan and Paul.

As a young woman Iris Gower worked as a nursery teacher and took other part-time jobs. She began writing in her twenties and had several stories published in magazines such as Woman's Own and Jackie. She published her first novel, Tudor Tapestry, in 1974, but success came with her novel, Copper Kingdom (1983). It was one of many of her novels set in the copper, pottery and other industries of Swansea or in the rural life of Gower.

Iris Gower was awarded an MA in Creative Writing by Cardiff University, and an Honorary Fellowship at Swansea University (1999). Altogether she wrote about 40 published books, including 26 novels.

In the latter part of her career she and her husband settled at Derwen Fawr, Swansea. But on 15 April 2002 her husband of 48 years died after a stroke. Later Iris lived with a partner, Peter Snadden, and continued writing. She remained interested in fostering the work of other writers. She became a patron of the Year of Literature in Swansea, and at the Swansea Writers' Circle welcomed and encouraged the novelist Catrin Collier.

Gower is quoted as saying in 2009, "You can learn technicalities but not creativity. There were no lessons when I started. So I just put my four children to bed at 7 pm and wrote. I wouldn't pay for a course. If people are so damn good at writing, why are they teaching and not writing? I research a lot and talk to people. People's anecdotes are like gold nuggets."

Iris Gower died at Singleton Hospital, Swansea, on 20 July 2010. She was 75 years old.

== Bibliography ==
- Burn Bright Shadow (1975)
- The Copper Cloud (1976)
- Return to Tip Row (1977)
- Beloved Captive (1981)
- Copper Kingdom (1983)
- Proud Mary (1984)
- Spinners' Wharf (1985)
- Morgan’s Woman (1986)
- Fiddler’s Ferry (1987)
- The Loves of Catrin (1987)
- Black Gold (1988)
- Beloved Traitor (1981)
- Beloved Rebel (1981)
- The Sins of Eden (1990)
- The Shoemaker's Daughter (1991)
- The Oyster Catchers (1992)
- Honey's Farm (1993)
- Arian (1994)
- Sea Mistress (1995)
- The Wild Seed (1996)
- Firebird (1997)
- Emerald (1998)
- Dream Catcher (1998)
- Destiny’s Child (1998)
- Sea Witch (1998)
- A Royal Ambition (1999)
- Sweet Rosie (1999)
- Daughters of Rebecca (2000)
- Heart on Fire (2000)
- When Night Closes In (2000)
- Heart in Ice (2000)
- Kingdom's Dream (2001)
- Heart of Stone (2001)
- Paradise Park (2002)
- The Rowan Tree (2003)
- Halfpenny Field (2004)
- The Other Woman (2005)
- Act of Love (2006)
- Bargain Bride (2007)
