= By Any Name =

- Directed by: Euros Jones-Evans
- Written by: Catrin Collier
- Based on: By Any Name by Catrin Collier
- Produced by: Euros Jones-Evans
- Starring: Cengiz Dervis; Samira Mohamed Ali; Dan Richardson; Victor Ptak; Huw Richards; Phillip Embrey; Chris Hurley; Ernest Vernon; Louise Fellows; Claire Richards
- Cinematography: Paul Dudbridge
- Production company: Tanabi
- Release dates: January 2016 (North Wales); 2017
- Country: United Kingdom
- Language: English

By Any Name is a 2016 British action thriller film, that has won two awards at the 2016 North Wales International Film Festival and is based on the book of the same name by Catrin Collier. The film follows the story of John West who is admitted to a psychiatric ward suffering from trauma-induced amnesia after he was found half naked running down a motorway and covered in blood. He has no memory of who he is. All he can recall is a detailed knowledge of sophisticated weaponry and military techniques that indicates a background in terrorism.

When two armed soldiers guarding his room are murdered and Dr Liz Santer Samira Mohamed Ali, the psychiatrist assigned to his case, is abducted at gunpoint, a desperate hunt begins for a dangerous killer. Liz attempts to help her captor recover his memory despite all the warnings of what she might find. Is Liz in the hands of a homicidal terrorist or an innocent pawn? Her life depends on the right answer.

== Cast ==
- Cengiz Dervis as John West: A man who is found covered in blood with no memory of who he is, but appears to have knowledge that only a special forces soldier or a terrorist would have. He is immediately taken into custody in order to find out the truth of his identity.
- Samira Mohamed Ali as Dr Liz Santer: A Psychiatrist who is mourning the loss of her husband but is soon caught up in solving the mystery of her latest patient.
- Dan Richardson - Captain Challoner
- Victor Ptak - Colonel Hedingham
- Huw Richards - Sergeant Price
- Phillip Embrey - Major Simmonds
- Chris Hurley - Inspector Barnes
- Ernest Vernon - Dr Dave Watson
- Louise Fellows - Bonnie McKenna
- Claire Richards - Duty Houseman

== Production ==
"I am very much part of the project to bring ‘By Any Name to the screen. The entire team at Tanabi are incredible, and determined to get everything right. I’ve written the script with the support of the director and the actors who are all superb professionals, and it is a huge privilege to be able to work with them."

— Katherine John (Author), on working with Tanabi

In 2014, it was announced that Author Catrin Collier (Katherine John) was working with Tanabi, a Welsh production company, to adapt the novel for the big screen in a deal negotiated with Marjacq Scripts Ltd. Filming commenced on the project in August 2014 and will run through to October and will be released in early 2017. It is said to be the first in a series of films that Catrin Collier and Tanabi Films will work on over the next few years. The film is being filmed on location in London, Swansea and Brecon where the films main narrative takes place. Recent film school graduate Shannon Walsh was initially lined up to direct before being replaced by producer Euros Jones-Evans.

== Novel ==
The novel, By Any Name, written by Katherine John, was released in early 2006 and was well received by critics and as well as fans of John herself. Much like the film, the book follows the story of Dr Elizabeth Santer who is desperately trying to help the man known as John West rediscover his memory despite warnings that West might be dangerous and is suspected of Terrorist activities.
