= The Grand (TV series) =

British TV drama series (1997–1998)

- Genre: Drama
- Created by: Russell T Davies
- Written by: Russell T Davies
- Composer: Julian Nott
- Country of origin: United Kingdom
- Original language: English
- No. of series: 2
- No. of episodes: 18

Production
- Production location: Manchester
- Running time: 50 minutes
- Production company: Granada Television

Original release
- Network: ITV
- Release: 4 April 1997 – 3 April 1998

The Grand is a British television drama series produced by Granada Television for the ITV network, broadcast between 4 April 1997 and 3 April 1998, The Grand was shown on Plus from 2002–2004. It was written by Russell T Davies and set in a grand hotel in Manchester in the 1920s.

There are two series: eight episodes in the first series were broadcast from 4 April 1997 to 23 May 1997 and ten in the second series from 30 January 1998 to 3 April 1998. All 18 episodes were written by Russell T Davies. The cast included Susan Hampshire, Julia St. John, Tim Healy, Michael Siberry, Stephen Moyer and Mark McGann.

The two series were novelised by Catrin Collier, under the pen name Katherine Hardy.

== Characters ==
The series featured the Bannerman family that owned and ran the hotel, the staff that lived in the basement and occasional guests.

At the series opening, the very upright John Bannerman (Michael Siberry) has just reopened the Grand, which he inherited from his overbearing father and which he now owns and operates with his staid and steady wife, Sarah (Julia St. John). On opening night of the new, refurbished Grand, their son, Stephen (Stephen Moyer in the first series, Ifan Meredith in the second) returns from service in World War I. Initially a happy occasion, it soon becomes apparent that Stephen is a damaged young man who hides his pain in alcohol. Their daughter, Adele (Camilla Power), a young teenager, feels ignored and finds more in common with the staff than she does her own family. After an unfortunate series of events puts the Grand in financial jeopardy, John's younger brother, Marcus (Mark McGann), a very intelligent but seemingly heartless businessman with shady connections to the underworld, offers to save the day by becoming a partner in the hotel—but are his motivations genuine, or does he have an ulterior motive? Also featured are John's stuffy mother, Mary, and Marcus' "lady friend," the beautiful Ruth Manning (Amanda Mealing in the first series, Victoria Scarborough in the second) who appears to be every bit Marcus' equal when it comes to cold-hearted calculation.

Jacob Collins (Tim Healy) is the all-seeing hall porter, seemingly in total control, yet plagued by demons of his own. Mrs Harvey (Christine Mackie) is the housekeeper who rules over the chambermaids with the iron hand of a prison guard. The most level headed of the chambermaids is the lovely Kate Morris (Rebecca Callard), who fights to convince herself and others that everyone has their place. Another chambermaid, the lively, likable, but unsatisfied and eternally in trouble Monica Jones (Jane Danson) is Kate's polar opposite. Lynn Milligan, Brenda Potter, Monica Jones play the other chambermaids. The ready-steady footman/bartender is Clive (Paul Warriner). Guests that featured in the series were Miss Esme Harkness (Susan Hampshire), a madame and semi-retired prostitute, who takes Monica under her wing; James Cornell (Daniel Casey); Maggie Rigby (Lucy Davis); a troublemaking school friend of Adele's, and her father, Lawrence, John Middleton.

== Books ==
- Hardy, Katherine (1997). The Grand. Simon & Schuster.
- Hardy, Katherine (1999). The Grand II. Simon & Schuster.
