= Andrée Bernard =

English actress

- Born: Andree Barnard
- Occupation: Actress
- Years active: 1983–present
- Known for: Hollyoaks
- Television: Hollyoaks (2003–06); Holby City (2015–17)

Andrée Bernard is an English actress best known for her major role as Liz Burton in the British soap opera Hollyoaks. She was a recurring guest artist in Holby City, and has had West End lead roles in Hair and Kiss Me Kate. She has also worked with Steven Berkoff, playing Sarah in The Actors Lament and Eve in 6 Actors In Search of a Director.

Born as Andree Barnard, she started acting in her early teens and, by the age of 17 in 1983, was appearing in episodes of The Two Ronnies and playing one of the two leading characters in the 1984 television film Sharon & Michelle. She also starred in Only Fools and Horses as Nervous Nerys.

In 1991, she played Gordon Brittas' secretary Angie throughout the first series of The Brittas Empire and appeared as Nervous Nerys, a barmaid in the Nag's Head, in Only Fools and Horses. In 1995, she appeared as Terri Gordon in "The Black Orchid", an episode of Taggart. She appeared in episodes of Lovejoy, Silent Witness and Agatha Christie's Poirot, and has made various, multiple appearances in The Bill. She appeared as Dolly in the Doctor Who episode "The Shakespeare Code". Most recently, she appeared in Steven Berkoff's play 6 Actors in Search of a Director, with Neil Stuke. Bernard also provided the voice of Nancy Hamilton in the video game Clock Tower 3.

She has also starred in Emmerdale (1989), Holby City (2015–2017), Playing Dead (2018), The Bill (playing various roles between 1992 and 2009), Crossroads (2002), Casualty (1993 and 1997), and Taggart (1995).
