= Samira Mohamed Ali =

Welsh model

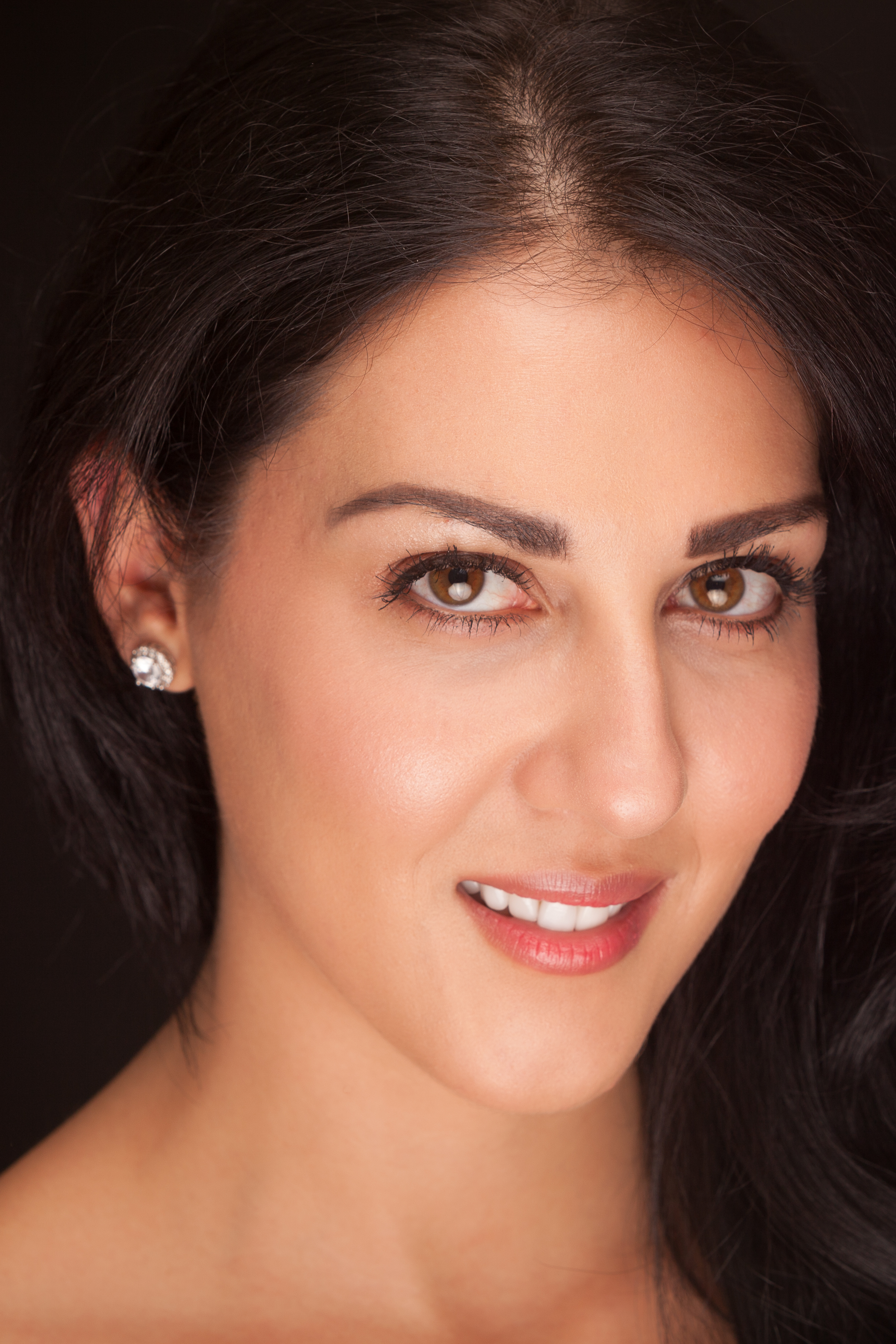
- Born: 15 December 1985 (age 40); Dubai
- Occupation: Model

Samira Mohamed Ali (born 15 December 1985) is an Indian model and actress.

== Early life ==
Samira Mohamed Ali was raised in Abu Dhabi. She has a brother named Hamad Mohamed Ali. The family moved to Neath, South Wales, UK when Samira was an early teenager. At the age of 22, Ali worked for HSBC, interviewing top banking leaders and directors at Canary Wharf.

== Acting ==
In 2012 she was involved in a horror film entitled Spirital Phantoma later appeared in the 2013 film Molly Crows.

On 2 April 2013, it was officially announced that Ali was to be a part of a Doctor Who fan film which will tie in with the 50th Anniversary of the show.

Samira Mohamed Ali worked in two Indian film- Badshah (2013) and B positive (2016).

== Filmography ==
=== Film ===
Year	Title	Director	co-Artist
2016	By Any Name	Euros Jones Evans	
2016	Locked Up	Euros Jones Evans	
2013	Molly Crows	Ray Wilkes	
2013	Badshah	Vijay Thammana	
2013	Spirital Phantoma	Asjid Ash Khan	
2016	B positive	venkatesh kumar	
