= Simon the Sorcerer Origins =

2025 video game

- Developer: Smallthing Studios
- Publisher: ININ Games
- Series: Simon the Sorcerer
- Platforms: Windows, macOS, Linux, Nintendo Switch, PlayStation 4, PlayStation 5, Xbox One, Xbox Series X/S
- Release: October 28, 2025
- Genre: Point-and-click adventure
- Mode: Single-player

Simon the Sorcerer Origins is a point-and-click adventure game developed by the Italian studio Smallthing Studios and published by ININ Games. A prequel to Adventure Soft's 1993 game Simon the Sorcerer, it is set a few weeks before the events of the original and follows an eleven-year-old Simon who is pulled into a parallel world of magic by an ancient prophecy. It was released on October 28, 2025 for Windows, macOS, Linux, Nintendo Switch, PlayStation 4, PlayStation 5, Xbox One and Xbox Series X/S.

The game received generally favourable reviews, with critics praising its hand-drawn art, writing and the return of Chris Barrie as the voice of Simon, while frequently criticising the obscurity of its puzzles and the absence of a hint system.

== Gameplay ==
Simon the Sorcerer Origins follows the conventions of 1990s point-and-click adventures: the player explores hand-drawn environments, talks to non-player characters, and collects items that are stored in Simon's bottomless wizard hat and combined to solve puzzles. Puzzles generally admit only one solution, and the game includes no hint system, although Simon occasionally remarks on possible approaches.

The interface departs from the original's cursor-driven design. Interactive objects can be cycled through with the shoulder buttons on a controller or revealed all at once, removing the pixel hunting associated with the genre, and an alternative control scheme closer to the original cursor system is also available; the handheld Switch version supports touchscreen input. An in-game map allows fast travel, and optional display filters can be enabled to simulate a CRT television. Simon frequently breaks the fourth wall, addressing the player directly and commenting on the contrivances of the puzzle design.

== Plot ==
Simon is an eleven-year-old boy who has been expelled from school; his exasperated parents move the family to a new house in a new town. The house proves to contain a portal to a parallel world of magic, where Simon is drawn into an ancient prophecy that he must fulfil in order to return home. He is sent to a wizards' academy, is given a set of wizard's robes, and sets out in search of the tomes of the First Wizard, encountering the mentor figure Calypso and his future adversary Sordid along the way. The story is structured around parodies of fantasy fiction, with running jokes at the expense of The Lord of the Rings and Harry Potter.

== Development and release ==
Smallthing Studios and publisher Leonardo Interactive announced Simon the Sorcerer Origins in May 2022, presenting it as neither a remake nor a remaster but a new prequel to the 1993 original, then planned for a 2023 release. The project was licensed from rights holder Adventure Soft Publishing. In 2023, the game was delayed to 2024, after which public communication largely stopped; the last trailer appeared at the Future Games Show Spring Showcase in March 2024.

In June 2025, retail listings for physical PlayStation 5 and Nintendo Switch versions indicated that the game was still in production and that publishing duties had moved from Leonardo Interactive to ININ Games. ININ subsequently confirmed the change and set a release date of October 28, 2025 across Windows, macOS, Linux, Switch, PlayStation 4 and 5, Xbox One and Xbox Series X/S. A Steam Deck-verified build was included, and a demo was made available during Steam Next Fest ahead of launch.

Chris Barrie, who voiced Simon in the first game, returned in the English version, with Erik Borner reprising the role in German. The original score was composed by Mason Fischer, and the opening credits use Rick Astley's 1988 single "Together Forever". The game was released alongside a soundtrack, an artbook and a "Pony" downloadable content item, the last of which replaces the score with rearrangements of music from the original games.

== Reception ==
Reception

Aggregate scores
Aggregator	Score
Metacritic	76/100
OpenCritic	75/100

Review scores
Publication	Score
GameStar	80/100
Hobby Consolas	80/100
Multiplayer.it	8/10
Nintendo Life	7/10
DualShockers	7/10
The Games Machine	8.8/10
Cubed3	6/10

Simon the Sorcerer Origins received "generally favorable" reviews according to review aggregator Metacritic, which assigned the Windows version a score of 76 out of 100 based on 17 critic reviews. OpenCritic rated it "Strong", with a Top Critic Average of 75 out of 100 from 46 reviews and 63 per cent of critics recommending it.

Critics widely agreed that the game is a faithful revival aimed at existing genre fans. Ken Talbot of Nintendo Life scored it 7 out of 10, calling it a solid return for the series and praising the script and the streamlined controls, but finding the animation stiff and some puzzles needlessly frustrating. Jack Penwell of DualShockers also gave 7 out of 10, highlighting the art style, voice work and fourth-wall humour while objecting to single-solution puzzles, the lack of variety between them and the absence of hints. Paul Kautz of the German magazine GameStar described the game as the best thing to happen to the series in thirty years, summarising it as a genuine Simon adventure, though his review was headlined as partly magical and partly frustrating.

Reviewers writing in other European markets were broadly positive. Daniel Quesada of Hobby Consolas scored it 80 out of 100, considering it a notable return for the graphic adventure that sticks to the fundamentals while innovating in places, though he cautioned that its difficulty would not suit everyone. Simone Tagliaferri of Multiplayer.it awarded 8 out of 10 and argued that the score required context: the game was deliberately made for fans of LucasArts-style adventures and strips away concessions to newcomers, a choice he acknowledged some would regard as a flaw. Paolo Besser of The Games Machine was more enthusiastic at 8.8 out of 10, praising the watercolour backdrops and the humour while noting that the puzzle design is unusually crude by modern standards.

Less favourable assessments focused on the writing and pacing. Luna Eriksson of Cubed3 scored the game 6 out of 10, finding the artwork attractive and the puzzles creative but characterising Simon as unpleasant rather than roguish and describing the humour as unrelieved slapstick across a six-hour running time.
