= Searching (TV series) =

- Genre: Sitcom
- Written by: Carla Lane
- Directed by: Robin Nash
- Starring: Prunella Scales; Julia St John; Victoria Carling
- Country of origin: United Kingdom
- Original language: English
- No. of series: 1
- No. of episodes: 7

Production
- Producers: John Bartlett; Bill Cotton; Carla Lane
- Running time: 30 minutes
- Production company: Carlton Television

Original release
- Network: ITV
- Release: 8 June – 20 July 1995

Searching is a British television sitcom which originally aired for one series on ITV between 8 June and 20 July 1995.

== Show summary ==
The series, which only ran for seven episodes, centres on the staff and patients at Sunfield Voluntary Therapy Centre, an organisation that supports women with their mental health.

== Cast ==
- Prunella Scales as Mrs. Tilston
- Julia St John as Chancy
- Victoria Carling as Lena
- Clare Cathcart as Dora
- Regina Freedman as Milly
- Robert Gwilym as Daniel Carter
- Amanda Bellamy as Hetty
- Reginald Marsh as Chancy's dad
- Marcia Warren as Chancy's mum
- Mabel Aitken as April
- Mark Williams as Gerald
- James Nesbitt as Duncan
- David Gooderson as Mr. Gillespie
- Jo Kendall as Nurse

== Bibliography ==
- Horace Newcomb. Encyclopedia of Television. Routledge, 2014.
