= Britain's Greatest Machines with Chris Barrie =

- Title card
- Genre: Documentary
- Directed by: Jeremy Cadle, Tom Gorham, Martin Gorst, Tom Adams
- Presented by: Chris Barrie
- Narrated by: Chris Barrie
- Country of origin: United Kingdom
- Original language: English
- No. of series: 2
- No. of episodes: 8 (list of episodes)

Production
- Producer: The Gamma Project
- Production location: Great Britain
- Camera setup: Steve Lidgerwood et al.
- Running time: 47 minutes

Original release
- Release: 4 June 2009 – 22 February 2010

Britain's Greatest Machines with Chris Barrie is a documentary television series from National Geographic Channel. It is showing the technological progress of the 19th and 20th centuries from a British point of view. Chris Barrie is the host and is testing various means of transportation.

== Series 1 ==
No.	Title	Original release date
1	"1930s: The Road to War"	4 June 2009
De Havilland Dragon Rapide, Sentinel S6 Steam Wagon, Morris Eight & Cat's Eye, LNER Class A4 Locomotive, Cruiser Mk III & Crusader Tanks, Supermarine S.6B and Supermarine Spitfire.
2	"1950s: A New World Order"	11 June 2009
AEC Routemaster, British Rail Class 55 Locomotive, Jodrell Bank Radio Telescope, Avro Vulcan, De Havilland Comet and Land Rover Series I.
3	"1960s: Revolution by Design"	18 June 2009
Mini Cooper, Post Office Tower, Leyland Super Comet, Ford Transit Mark I, Saunders-Roe SR.N6 Hovercraft and Jaguar E-Type.
4	"1980s: The Future Has Landed"	25 June 2009
DMC DeLorean, ZX Spectrum & Sinclair C5, Westland Lynx, Scimitar Tank, Lotus Esprit Essex Turbo and Ford Sierra RS Cosworth.

== Series 2 ==
No.	Title	Original release date
1	"1910s: Triumph and Tragedy"	1 February 2010
Leyland Torpedo Charabanc, Morgan Runabout, Middlesbrough Transporter Bridge, Wireless Telegraphy, Vickers Machine Gun, Mark IV & Mark V Tanks and Vickers Vimy.
2	"1920s: The Engine-Roaring Twenties"	8 February 2010
Bentley 3 Litre & Bentley 4½ Litre, ATCO Standard Lawn Mower, Scammell Pioneer & Gilbert & Barker T8 Petrol Pump, Brough Superior, De Havilland Gipsy Moth and R101 Airship.
3	"1940s: War - Mother of Invention"	15 February 2010
Chain Home Radar Network, Type One 100 Class HSL, Austin K2 Fire Engine & Jowett Fire Pump, David Brown VAK 1, Daimler Scout Car, Gloster Meteor & Martin-Baker Ejection Seat and Aston Martin DB2.
4	"Trains: The Steam Pioneers"	22 February 2010
Boulton and Watt West Cornish Engine, Coalbrookdale Locomotive, London Steam Carriage, Locomotion No 1, Rocket, Liverpool & Manchester Railway and Planet.
