= Julia St John =

British actress

- Born: Hammersmith, London, England
- Education: London Academy of Music and Dramatic Art
- Occupation: Actress
- Years active: 1982–present
- Spouse: Peter McEnery (m. 2007)

Julia St John is an English actress and theatre director. Her television credits include A Touch of Frost, The Brittas Empire, Agatha Christie's Poirot, Lovejoy, Minder, Harry Enfield and Chums, Lewis, and Victoria Wood, appearing in the episode "Over to Pam".

Directing credits include Walter and Lenny at the Minerva Theatre, Chichester, and Shakespeare, his Wife & the Dog at the Liverpool Playhouse.

== Stage ==
- Ludmilla in Alasdair Gray's McGrotty and Ludmilla at Tron Theatre (1986)
- Natasha in Chekhov's Three Sisters at the Minerva Theatre, Chichester (1994)
- Regan in King Lear directed by Peter Cheeseman at New Vic Theatre (1996)
- Lady Pembroke in Alan Bennett's The Madness of George III at West Yorkshire Playhouse (2003)
- Maya in Arthur Miller's The Archbishop's Ceiling at the Southwark Playhouse (2004)
- Sheila in Charlotte Keatley's Our Father at Watford Palace Theatre (2012)
- Mrs Lintott in Alan Bennett's The History Boys at the Sheffield Crucible (2013)
- Martha/Nelly Rose in Jefferson's Garden at Watford Palace Theatre (2015)
- Mrs Cotton in I Capture the Castle musical at Watford Palace Theatre and Octagon Theatre Bolton (2017)
- Mrs Malaprop in The Rivals at the Watermill Theatre in Bagnor, Newbury (2018)

== Selected film and television roles ==
- Charles & Diana: A Royal Love Story (1982) – as Jane Ward
- Victoria Wood, Over to Pam (1989) – as Caroline
- Blood Rights (1990) – as Lynn
- The Blackheath Poisonings (1992) – as Beatrice Vandervent
- Lovejoy, The Colour of Mary (1993) – as Rosemary
- The Brittas Empire (36 episodes, 1991–1994) – as Laura Lancing
- Searching (1995) – as Chancy
- Agatha Christie's Poirot – Dumb Witness (1996) – as Bella Tanios
- Princess in Love (1996) – as Camilla Parker Bowles
- The Grand (12 episodes, 1997–1998) – as Sarah Bannerman
- Harry Enfield and Chums (4 episodes, 1997) – as Arguing Wife / David's Mother
- Brand Spanking New Show (11 episodes, 2000) – as Various characters
- High Stakes, The Poacher (2001) – as Christabel Webster
- A Touch of Frost (7 episodes, 2003–2010) – as Pathologist Amanda Chase
- Doc Martin, Blood Is Thicker (2005) – as Sandra Mylow
- Julian Fellowes Investigates: A Most Mysterious Murder – The Case of the Earl of Erroll (2005) – as Gwladys Delamere
- The Line of Beauty (2 episodes, 2006) – as Greta Timms
- Lewis, And the Moonbeams Kiss the Sea (2008) – as Naomi Norris
- Doctors, (2 episodes, 2008–2011) – as Alice Connor / Agnes Fricke
- Casualty (2006–2011) – as Sarah Evans

== Radio ==
- Legal Affairs (1996), five-part series on BBC Radio 4
