= Tim Marriott =

British actor

- Born: Timothy William Marriott; Hammersmith, London, England
- Occupation: Actor
- Years active: 1991–present
- Known for: Gavin Featherly in The Brittas Empire

Timothy William Marriott is a British television actor, playwright and theatre director. He is known for his role as Gavin Featherly in the BBC sitcom The Brittas Empire.

== Career ==
Marriott's most noted role was as Gavin Featherly in the BBC leisure centre sitcom The Brittas Empire. It ran for 52 episodes in over six years on BBC1, from 3 January 1991 to 24 February 1997.

He later wrote for the stage. His play Meeting Mary was put on at the Jermyn Street Theatre, London, in January 2005 while his piece Pete 'n' Me, put on at the New End Theatre also in London in February 2005, was described as "skilfully woven" by Paul Vale of The Stage.

In 2000, Marriott left theatre acting to become Director of Drama at Eastbourne College.

Between 2015 and 2017, he co-wrote the play Mengele with Philip Wharam, which toured theatres and festivals in 2017, including the Edinburgh Fringe and Ludlow Festival. The play starred Marriott as Dr Josef Mengele and Emma Zadow as Azra'il. In the autumn of 2017, it moved to the SoHo Playhouse in New York, where it won an award.

Shows in 2018 included Katzpace in London's Borough Market, and the Bedford Festival. As a constituent part of Guy Masterson's "Lest We Forget" tour, it played at The Bakehouse Theatre in Adelaide, South Australia.

Marriott also adapted and now performs a PTSD-themed solo show, Shell Shock, which was selected Best Male Solo Show (Sunday Mail) at the Adelaide Fringe in 2018.

In late 2019 Marriott co-wrote (with Sherlock Holmes specialist Bert Coules) a new one-man play, Watson: The Final Problem. An initial audio version was made during the first Covid lockdown, followed by a single tryout performance at the Grove Theatre Eastbourne. Since then, Marriott has toured the piece to great success in the UK and abroad.

== Personal life ==
Timothy William Marriott was born in Hammersmith, London, England, the youngest son of Michael Marriott.

Marriott required dental surgery after playing cricket without a helmet in 2010. He top-edged a ball into his face while playing with his 15-year-old son at the Nevill Ground during Bluemantles Cricket week.

== Filmography ==
- 'Allo 'Allo! (1 episode, 1991) (TV)
- An Actor's Life for Me (1 episode, 1991) (TV)
- The Brittas Empire (52 episodes, 1991–1997)
- Doctors (1 episode, 2002) (TV)
- Casanova's Last Stand (2005)
