= Chris Barrie =

British actor and comedian (born 1960)

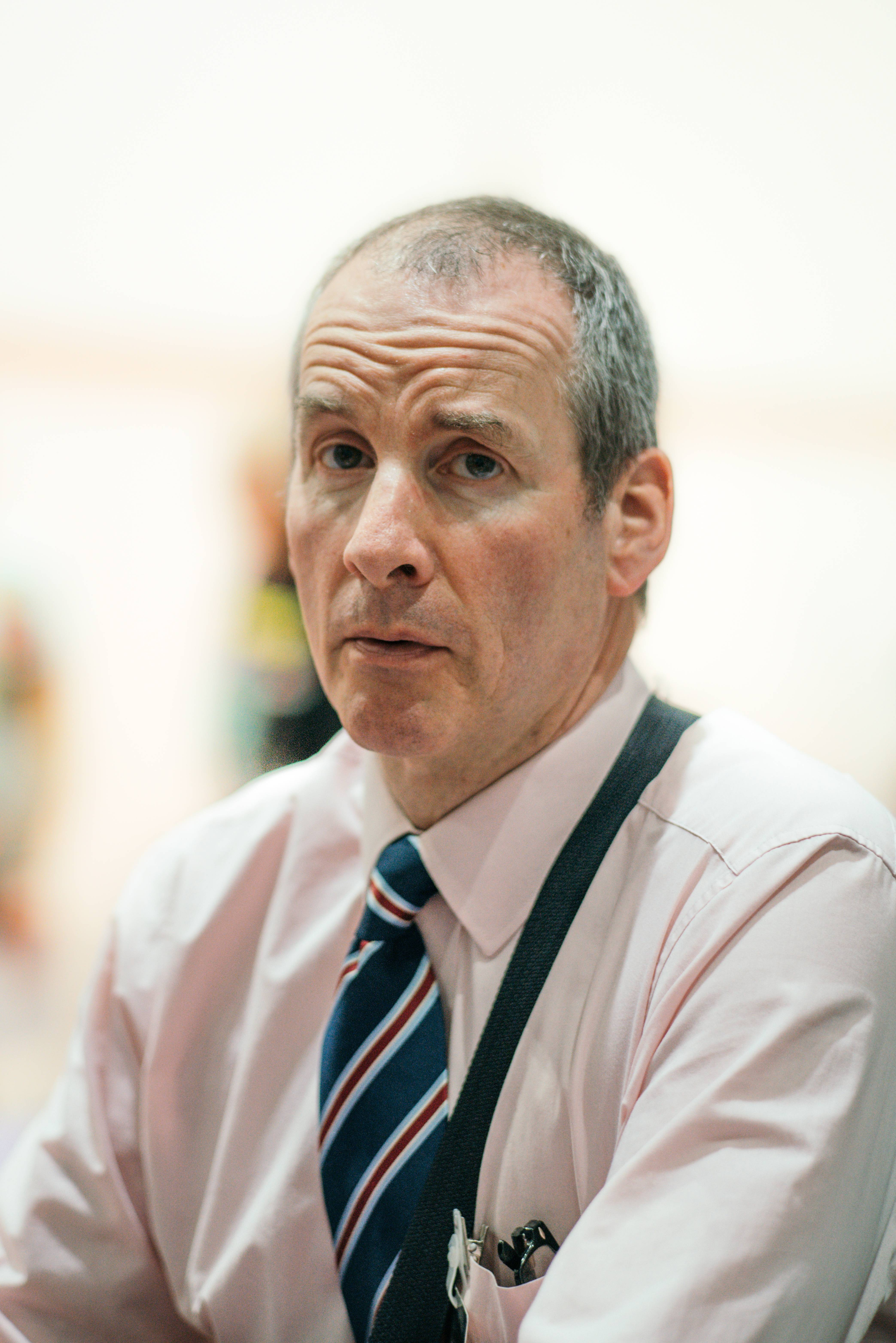
- Barrie in 2017
- Born: Christopher Jonathan Brown; 28 March 1960 (age 66); Hanover, West Germany
- Occupations: Actor; comedian; impressionist
- Years active: 1982–present
- Known for: Red Dwarf; The Brittas Empire; Lara Croft: Tomb Raider
- Spouses: Monica De Meo (m. 1987; div. 1990) Alecks Barrie (m. 1997)
- Children: 2
- Website: http://www.chrisbarrie.co.uk/

Chris Barrie (born Christopher Jonathan Brown; 28 March 1960) is a British actor and comedian. He worked as a vocal impressionist on the ITV sketch show Spitting Image (1984–1996) and as Lara Croft's butler Hillary in Lara Croft: Tomb Raider (2001) and Lara Croft Tomb Raider: The Cradle of Life (2003). Barrie starred as Arnold Rimmer in 13 series of the sci-fi space comedy Red Dwarf between 1988 and 2020, and as Gordon Brittas in seven series of the BBC leisure centre sitcom The Brittas Empire (1991–1997).

== Early life and career ==
Barrie was born on 28 March 1960 in Hanover, Lower Saxony, West Germany, to a father who was serving in the British Army, and later attended Methodist College, a boarding school, in Belfast, Northern Ireland. After dropping out of his Combined Studies course at Brighton Polytechnic, he became a grave filler. He began his television career as a sports personality impersonator on The David Essex Showcase in 1982.

He adopted the surname "Barrie" as there was already an actor named Chris Brown on the Equity UK lists. He was a regular on Saturday Live, amongst performers like Fry and Laurie, Rik Mayall and Ben Elton. Barrie provided the voice of Ronald Reagan in the pop song "Two Tribes" by Frankie Goes to Hollywood, as well as various vocalizations for other tracks by FGTH and Art of Noise. He also appeared as an impressionist on the BBC's Carrott's Lib between 1983 and 1984, and he starred in his own sketch show Pushing Up Daisies (re-titled Coming Next for the following series) from 1984 to 1985 alongside Hale and Pace and Carla Mendonça. In 1987, he appeared as a French Revolutionary in Blackadder the Third (episode "Nob and Nobility") and did various parts in The Young Ones both as an actor and a voice-over.

== Red Dwarf ==
Barrie played the character Arnold J. Rimmer in all twelve series of Red Dwarf, appearing in almost every episode of the series, absent only for a period during series 7. When an unsold pilot for an American version of the show was produced, Barrie was invited to reprise his role as Rimmer. He passed up the offer because of the constraint of the five-series contract. He starred in the 2020 special Red Dwarf: The Promised Land, alongside the main cast of Craig Charles, Danny John-Jules and Robert Llewellyn. In addition to starring in the TV series, Barrie also narrated the first two Red Dwarf books, Infinity Welcomes Careful Drivers (1992) and Better Than Life (1995), including using his vocal talents to recreate the voices of the other characters, as they sound in the show.

== The Brittas Empire ==
Barrie played Gordon Brittas, the title role in The Brittas Empire, a BBC sitcom running from January 1991 to February 1997 for seven series, with 52 episodes, including two Christmas specials. Brittas was the well-meaning but incompetent manager of Whitbury New Town Leisure Centre. Each episode featured a disastrous occurrence, which Brittas was sure he could sort out, oblivious to the fact he was usually its cause.

Barrie also appeared as Brittas in the stand alone fitness mini-series Get Fit with Brittas in 1997.

In 2014, Barrie reprised his role as Gordon Brittas in the music video for Little Mix's version of "Word Up!".

In 2017, the cast reunited for the reopening of Ringwood Leisure centre where a lot of the series was recorded.

== Roles in television and films ==
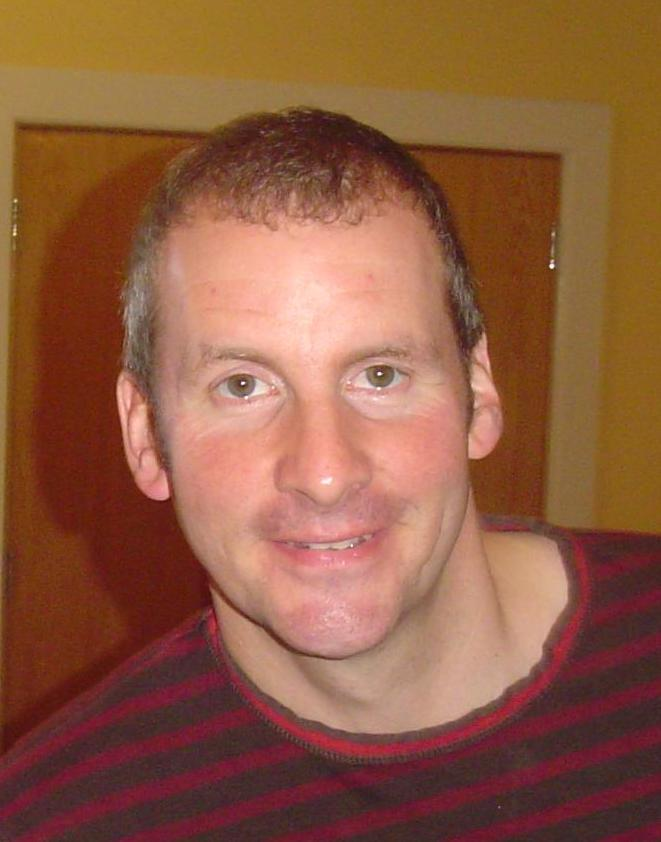
Barrie in 2004

Barrie's TV work includes Britain's Greatest Machines with Chris Barrie, screened on the National Geographic channel from 4 June 2009. Each of the four episodes features some of the most notable air, sea, and land vehicles and equipment of the 1930s, 1950s, 1960s, and 1980s, respectively. The second series of four episodes was transmitted in February 2010, with the 1910s, 1920s, 1940s, and early steam trains as the subjects of each episode.

Barrie has also hosted the television series Chris Barrie's Massive Engines and Chris Barrie's Massive Machines on the Discovery Channel, later shown on Channel 5 and released on DVD. The latest in this series Massive Speed with Chris Barrie was shown on Discovery Channel from November 2006. In 2006, he appeared as a regular team captain in the BBC Two quiz show Petrolheads and was the star of the British crime/comedy/drama film Back In Business, in which he played Tom Marks. Between 2015 and 2018 he was the voice-over for Channel 5's Car Crash TV and 2018–2019 Idiot TV.

== Filmography ==
Film
Year	Title	Role(s)	Notes
1985	Honour, Profit & Pleasure	Alexander Pope	TV Movie
1988	Testimony	Carnival Thin Man	Appearance in film at 15.25 with Frank Carson
1994	White Goods	Mickie Scott	TV Movie
1999	The Comedy Trail: A Shaggy Dog Story	Arnold Rimmer	TV special
2001	Lara Croft: Tomb Raider	Hillary The Butler	
2003	Lara Croft Tomb Raider: The Cradle of Life	Hillary The Butler	
2007	Back in Business	Tom Marks	
2007	The Scum Also Rises	Mr Broom	TV Movie
2008	The Optician	John	Short Film

TV
Year	Title	Role(s)	Notes
1982	David Essex Showcase	Sports Personality	1 Episode
1982	Six Fifty-Five Special	Various	1 Episode
1982, 1984	The Young Ones	Voice of a Rat, Captain	Demolition 1982, Nasty 1984
1983	Carrott's Lib	Various	10 Episodes
1983-1984	The Entertainers	Various	2 Episodes
1984	Pajamarama	Stand up	1 Episode
1984	Stomping on the Cat 2	Stand Up/Impersonations	Channel 4
1984	Pushing Up Daisies	Various	
1984-1991	Spitting Image	Various	Voices Also a Puppeteer for the First Two Series.
1985	Coming Next	Various	
1985	The Lenny Henry Show	Various	Series 2, Episode 6.
1985	Alas Smith and Jones	Various	Series 2, Episode 2.
1985	Happy Families	Sammy	Episode 2, Cassie
1985-1987	Saturday Live	Michael Foot; John Cole; Richie Benaud; Robin Day; David Coleman; Ronald Reagan	2 Episodes
1986	Zastrozzi: A Romance	Waiter	TV Mini-Series, 2 Episodes
1986	Lenny Henry Tonite (Pratt Outta Hell)	Boss	Series 1, First Episode
1986	Spitting Image: Down and Out in the White House	Various Voices	TV Special
1987	Filthy, Rich & Catflap	Trevor The Director	1 Episode
1987	Blackadder The Third	Ambassador	Series 3, Episode 3, Nob and Nobility
1987	Spitting Image:The Ron & Nancy Show	Ronald Reagan, Prince Charles	TV Special
1988	Open Air	Guest	Discussing the first series of Red Dwarf
1988	The New Statesman	Various	Voice, 1 Episode
1988-2020	Red Dwarf	Arnold Rimmer	All Episodes apart from 4 in series 7
1989	Ten Glorious Years-A Thatcher 'Tribute'	Various Impressions Including Ronald Regan/John Cole	BBC TV Special
1989	Spitting Image: The Sound of Maggie!	Various Voices	TV Special 6/5/89
1991	Happy Birthday Switzerland	Various Character Voices	Animated Short
1991-1997	The Brittas Empire	Gordon Brittas	All Episodes
1992	Grace and Favour(Are You Being Served? Again!)	Commentator	Voice, Series 1, Episode 3
1992	Wogan	Guest	Series 12, Episode 11
1993	Comic Relief: The Invasion of the Comic Tomatoes	Arnold Rimmer	TV Special
1993	ABC Weekend Special	Voice	1 Episode, The Legend of Lochnagar.
1993-1994	Jackanory	Storyteller	5 Episodes
1993-1994	Noel's House Party	Gordon Brittas	2 Episodes
1993-1995	The Legends of Treasure Island	Captain Smollett/Ben Gunn	Voices
1994	Ben Elton: The Man from Auntie	Mastermind Presenter/Lingua-Learn narrator (voices only)	Series 2, Episodes 3 and 6
1994	Know Your Europeans: The United Kingdom	Voice Only	
1995	Chris Barrie's Motoring Wheel Nuts	Various Characters	Video
1996	Kevin Saves the World	Voice Only	Animated Short
1996	The Big Breakfast	Guest	18 April
1997	Get Fit with Brittas	Mr Brittas	
1997	Managing the Brittas Way	Mr Brittas	BBC Learning Business Video
1997-1998	A Prince Among Men	Gary Prince	All Episodes
1998	Can't Smeg, Won't Smeg	Rimmer	Special edition of Can't Cook, Won't Cook, (Red Dwarf 10th anniversary)
1998	Universe Challenge	Jeremy Paxman/Himself as a Contestant	Special Red Dwarf (10th anniversary) Edition of University Challenge
1999	Hancock's World of Sport	Guest	BBC One 15/9/99 One off Special
2003	Top Gear	Himself	Series 2, Episode 2
2004	Massive Engines with Chris Barrie	Presenter	1 Series, 10 Episodes
2004-2005	Massive Machines with Chris Barrie	Presenter	1 Series, 10 Episodes
2006	Massive Speed with Chris Barrie	Presenter	1 Series, 10 Episodes
2006	Petrolheads	Team Captain	All 6 Episodes
2006	When Evil Calls	Headmaster; Samantha's Father	2 Episodes
2007	Fifth Gear	Guest	Episode 2
2007	Midsomer Murders	Lionel Poulter	Series 10, Episode 8
2009-2010	Britain's Greatest Machines with Chris Barrie	Presenter	2 Series, 8 Episodes
2010	Carpool	Guest	
2010	The Wright Stuff	Guest	
2011	The Fruit Cases	Happy Apple/Peelin/Sour Lolly (voices)	Animated Short
2015-2018	Car Crash TV	Narrator	4 Series
2018-2019	Idiot TV	Narrator	2 Series, 20 Episodes

Audiobooks
Year	Book	Role(s)	Notes
1992	Red Dwarf: Infinity Welcomes Careful Drivers"	Narrator (Impersonates the Whole Cast)	
1995	Red Dwarf: Better Than Life	Narrator (Impersonates the Whole Cast)	
1995	Gordon Brittas: Sharing the Dream	Narrated and performed as Gordon Brittas	
1998	The Man on Platform 5	Narrator/Performer	
1999	Monsters	Narrator	Young Children's Book
2012	Opal Moonbaby	Narrator	Children's Book
2021	Stephen Llewelyn Dinosaur: Book 1	Narrator/Performer	
2023	Stephen Llewelyn Revenge: Book 2	Narrator/Performer	
2026	Red Dwarf: Titan	Narrator (Impersonates the Whole Cast)	

Music Videos
Year	Artist	Title	Role(s)
1984	Art of Noise	"Close (to the Edit)"	Robin Day
1985	Frankie Goes to Hollywood	"The Power of Love"	Voice of Mike Read
1985	Frankie Goes to Hollywood	"Tag"	Voice of Prince Charles
1985	Frankie Goes to Hollywood	"Two Tribes" (12" Mix)	Voice of Ronald Reagan
1986	Genesis	"Land of Confusion"	Voice of Ronald Reagan
2014	Little Mix	"Word Up!"	Mr. Brittas

Video Games
Year	Title	Role(s)	Notes
1993	Simon the Sorcerer	Voice of Simon	
2025	Simon the Sorcerer Origins	Voice of Simon	

== Personal life ==
Barrie's interests include collecting vintage metal signs, vintage motorbikes, and old British cars. He also collects model railways, which he purchased from the now closed model shop in Cookham, Berkshire, formerly a Lloyd's Bank featured in the TV hit Fawlty Towers. In 1995, he released a video called Chris Barrie's Motoring Wheel Nuts, a showcase for his personal car collection. As of 2022, his classic car collection consists of a Triumph TR2, MGB-GT, Wolseley 1500 and a Jaguar XJ6.

He has been married twice: first to Monica De Meo from 1987 to 1990 and then to Alecks (1997–present) with whom he has two sons. He lives in Cookham, Berkshire.

In 2010, Barrie was awarded an honorary DTech (Doctor of Technology) by Loughborough University for his contribution to promoting Engineering and Technology.
