= Suzanne Charlton =

British meteorologist

Suzanne L. Charlton (born 1962) is an English BBC weather forecaster and daughter of footballer Bobby Charlton. She joined the Met Office in 1985 as a computer programmer soon after graduating from the University of Reading. Charlton transferred to the London Weather Centre in 1987 and became part of the BBC Weather team in 1989, remaining on screen until the late 1990s.

== Early life ==
Born in Urmston, Lancashire, Charlton attended Loreto Grammar School, a Roman Catholic girls' grammar school in Altrincham, with her sister Andrea. Charlton graduated from the University of Reading in 1985 with a degree in physics and meteorology that she was reading.

== Career ==
In September 1985, having been interested in the weather since her time at school from the age of 14, Charlton joined the Met Office at its headquarters in Bracknell, where she worked as a computer programmer plotting weather charts.

In 1987, she transferred to the London Weather Centre as a forecaster, joining the BBC weather team in late March 1989 following a week-long stint on the south-east opt-out slot on BBC Television. Charlton was the third woman to present the weather forecasts on BBC Television. For four months in 1990, she spent four months enrolled on a senior weather forecasters course at the Met Office, firstly at college before she was seconded to an RAF base in West Germany. Charlton appeared on an episode of the television programme Jim'll Fix It in May 1993. She took maternity leave from 1999, which she took for five years.

Charlton returned to BBC Weather bulletins on a part-time basis in March 2006 and left the BBC Weather Centre in March 2007. She is a fellow of the Royal Meteorological Society.

== Personal life ==
Charlton is the elder daughter of former Manchester United and England footballer, Bobby Charlton (1937–2023) and his wife Norma Ball, and the niece of the late Leeds United and England footballer Jack Charlton. She married the tennis coach and former player Nick Brown at Dean Row Unitarian Church close to Wilmslow, Cheshire on 11 August 1994. She has one son (born in October 1998) and lives in Hitchin, Hertfordshire.

Charlton is a keen sports fan, with her special interests being football, tennis, and skiing. She also played hockey for her university. Charlton competed in national horse-riding events, and is a group instructor with the Riding for the Disabled Association.
