= The Brittas Empire =

British TV sitcom (1991–1997)

- Genre: Black comedy Farce; Sitcom
- Created by: Andrew Norriss; Richard Fegen
- Directed by: Mike Stephens; Christine Gernon
- Starring: Chris Barrie; Pippa Haywood; Julia St John; Mike Burns; Harriet Thorpe; Tim Marriott; Jill Greenacre; Russell Porter; Judy Flynn; Stephen Churchett; Anouschka Menzies; Andrée Bernard; John Carrigan
- Theme music composer: Frank Renton
- Country of origin: United Kingdom
- Original language: English
- No. of series: 7
- No. of episodes: 52 (list of episodes)

Production
- Executive producer: Mike Stephens
- Producer: Mike Stephens
- Running time: 30 mins

Original release
- Network: BBC1
- Release: 3 January 1991 – 24 February 1997

Related
- Get Fit with Brittas

The Brittas Empire is a British sitcom created and originally written by Andrew Norriss and Richard Fegen. Chris Barrie played titular character Gordon Brittas, the well-intentioned but hugely incompetent manager of the fictional Whitbury New Town Leisure Centre. The show ran for seven series and 52 episodes – including two Christmas specials – from 3 January 1991 to 24 February 1997 on BBC1. Creators Norriss and Fegen co-wrote the first five series.

The Brittas Empire enjoyed a long and successful run throughout the 1990s, and gained large mainstream audiences. In 2004, the show came 47th on the BBC's Britain's Best Sitcom poll, and all series have been released on DVD both individually as series and as a complete boxset. Best of the Britcoms noted the series has been hailed as "the Fawlty Towers of the 1990s" due to its "fast-paced, outrageous [comedy] full of inventive gags".

The creators Andrew Norriss and Richard Fegen often combined farce with either surreal or dramatic elements in episodes. For example, in the first series, the leisure centre prepares for a royal visit, only for the doors to seal, the boiler room to flood and a visitor to become electrocuted. Unlike many traditional sitcoms, deaths were quite commonplace in The Brittas Empire. Barrie described the humour as "straightforward, slapstick, very accessible characters, larger-than-life abnormal things happening in a very normal situation".

== Plot summary ==
Gordon Brittas (Chris Barrie) is the well-meaning but incompetent manager of Whitbury New Town Leisure Centre. He trained at the fictional Aldershot Leisure Centre. Completely tactless, totally annoying, and forever coming up with 'half-baked' ideas (and oblivious to all of his aforementioned faults), Brittas frequently upsets his staff, public, and his frazzled wife Helen (Pippa Haywood), often bringing confusion and chaos into their lives. Helen finds coping with Gordon increasingly difficult and turns to medication and affairs with other men to maintain her sanity.

Helen is often helped by her supportive friend Laura Lancing (Julia St John), Brittas' calm, efficient deputy manager. Though she is fully aware of his incompetence and the annoyance he causes his colleagues and customers, Laura has a grudging admiration for Brittas, regarding him as honest and decent. His other deputy manager is the dim-witted but kind Colin Weatherby (Mike Burns) (credited as Michael Burns in series 1, 2 and 3). Colin has several medical problems including skin allergies, a constantly bandaged infected hand, and a sizeable boil on his face. Technically a deputy manager, he works more efficiently as the centre's caretaker.

The other core members of the team are Carole (Harriet Thorpe) the unfortunate, often tearful receptionist, who keeps her three children in the reception drawers and cupboards; the gentle-hearted Gavin (Tim Marriott) who becomes Deputy Manager in Series 5; his paranoid, sometimes-manic partner Tim (Russell Porter); lively, principled Linda (Jill Greenacre); and Julie (Judy Flynn), Brittas' sarcastic secretary, who hates her boss and refuses to do any work for him.

Outside the core staff is Councillor Jack Druggett (Stephen Churchett), who is unable to sack Brittas despite numerous attempts.

Cast alterations in the series: 'Angie' (Andrée Bernard), who appears as a main character in the first series, is replaced by 'Julie' from series two onwards. 'Laura' left the show after series five, at the same time as the creators and writers. She is replaced in series six by the character 'Penny' (Anouschka Menzies). 'Penny' did not return in series seven.

According to Barrie, Gordon Brittas is well-meaning but insensitive because he has a lofty dream to make the world a better place, but he doesn't know how to execute it on the small scale. At the same time Barrie was playing Brittas, he was also playing his other well-known role of Arnold Rimmer in Red Dwarf. The characters had similar personality flaws (although Brittas always attempted to be friendly to those around him while Rimmer treated everyone with nothing but contempt) and even some of their history matched; for instance both characters had brief and unsuccessful stints at the Samaritans. Unlocking your potential describes Colin as a habitual 'yes' man, who seeks validation through compliance. While Gordon himself is a larger than life creation, he is balanced out by his slightly more 'normal' long suffering staff as foil to offset his antics.

== Episodes ==
The Brittas Empire ran for 52 episodes between 1991 and 1997, as seven series, two Christmas specials and a BBC Children in Need charity special. The cast performed a sketch for the 1996 Royal Variety Performance, in which Brittas and his staff mistake the Dominion Theatre for the Prince Of Wales Theatre during an inspection. Chris Barrie returned to the character a final time for the short-lived spin-off Get Fit with Brittas, intended to promote healthier lifestyles.

The first five series were solely co-written by the show's creators Richard Fegen and Andrew Norriss, concluding their involvement with the accident-prone Brittas apparently crushed to death by a falling water tank ("The Last Day") and a flashback episode set at Christmas 1989 ("In the Beginning").

The show's popularity with viewers prompted the BBC to commission two further series, bringing in a new team of experienced comedy writers including Paul Smith, Terry Kyan, Tony Millan, Mike Walling, Ian Davidson and Peter Vincent. The regular cast returned with the exception of Julia St John who played deputy manager Laura.

The final episode, "Curse of the Tiger Women", aired in February 1997. The ending revealed the entire seven series are a dream that Brittas is having on his way to the job interview for the manager's post at the leisure centre.

The series has been repeated many times on British television, most notably by Gold since 1998, also Forces TV in 2021 and U&Drama since 2023.

In 2014, Chris Barrie reprised his role as Gordon Brittas for a brief appearance in the Sport Relief music video, "Word Up!" by Little Mix.

== DVD and VHS releases ==
All seven series were released on DVD in the United Kingdom by Eureka Video, and also in Australia by the Australian Broadcasting Corporation. The Eureka releases are now out of print. Prior to these DVD releases, the BBC brought episodes to VHS in the 1990s.

- The VHS title: The Brittas Empire – Laying the Foundations features: 'Laying the Foundations' (Series 1: Episode 1), 'Back from the dead' (Series 2: Episode 1), 'Set in Concrete' (Series 2: Episode 4), 'An Inspector Calls' (Series 2: Episode 3) and 'The Trial' (Series 3: Episode 1).
- Then on 7 August 1995, Brittas Empire – The Stuff of Dreams was released and features the episodes: 'The Christening' (Series 4: Episode 2), 'The Stuff of Dreams' (Series 3: Episode 6) and 'Not a Good Day' (Series 4: Episode 1).
- From 2003, Eureka Video began bringing the entire series to DVD, in single-series box sets. The Brittas Empire -–Complete Series One was released on 21 July 2003, followed by series two on 20 October 2003, and then series three was released on 29 January 2004. Series four was released in the same year on 29 July, and the final series by Norriss and Fegen, series five, was released on 4 October 2004.
- The Brittas Empire, Complete Series Six was released on 21 February 2005, and the final series along with the 1996 Christmas Special, was released on 23 May 2005.
- The Brittas Empire, Complete Series One – Seven, a set comprising the entire series, was released on 8 October 2007.

=== DVD release dates ===
DVD	Episodes	Year	Release date	
DVD	Episodes	Year	Region 2	Region 4
Series 1	6	1991	21 July 2003 (Note: This series was also released in region 2 on a single disc DVD on 7 January 2008)	4 August 2004
Series 2	7	1992	20 October 2003	6 May 2005
Series 3	6	1993	19 January 2004	3 August 2005
Series 4	8	1994	19 July 2004	2 March 2006
Series 5	9	1994	4 October 2004	6 July 2006
Series 6	7	1996	21 February 2005	7 March 2007
Series 7	9	1997	23 May 2005	3 July 2007
Series 1–7	52	1991–1997	8 October 2007	N/A

== Critical response ==
The series has received a highly positive reception from critics and fans, and has been analysed for its themes.

The book Writing Dialogue for Scripts argues that the show's comedy is largely fuelled by the dramatic irony of the audience knowing that the main character is not important, while he believes he is, and compared Brittas to Captain Mainwaring in Dad's Army. Critics John Lewis and Penny Stempel noted the series' theme of "an incompetent in charge of others" in the vein of TV humour from Dad's Army to Are You Being Served?, coupled with an element of absurdism. The Shakespeare Library lists it as an example of a TV show that has fun with the idea of a man given a little power and authority that goes to his head. I'm Too Busy to be Stressed described Gordon as a classic example of an over-compensating individual who exhibits a sense of authority to camouflage the inferiority beneath.

The website British Comedy Guide wrote in 2021 that The Brittas Empire had "aged very well" in the 30 years since its debut. The character has been described by critics as a popular portrayal of an Aspergers character along with Mr. Bean, as they both demonstrate inappropriate social behaviour. According to the Eastern Europe Travel Survivors Kit 1994, shows like The Brittas Empire and American primetime soap opera Dynasty formed the backbone of Poland's two state TV channels. British Cultural Identities believed the series successfully critiqued contemporary British pretensions. Red Dwarf Smegazine argued in 1993 that, while Red Dwarf had been a success, "Chris [Barrie] is perhaps better known by many TV viewers for The Brittas Empire". The Encyclopedia of TV Science Fiction wrote that the series saw Barrie achieve more mainstream success.

== Revival ==
Talks of a Christmas special or a revival were raised in 2015, though ultimately neither project was picked up. Of a revival, The Guardian wrote that while the original run "never really entered the fabric of popular culture...arguably, tastes have advanced enough for people to warm to a mainstream sitcom that includes the chainsaw dismemberment of several innocent people". In 2017, Digital Spy wrote that the show "arguably inspired Ricky Gervais' The Office in the early noughties, which went on to have huge success – so it's only natural The Brittas Empire may be in for a reboot".

In October 2017, the cast and original writers attended the re-launching of the Ringwood Recreation Centre, where the series was filmed, and Barrie hoped the event would be a catalyst for an eighth series. He said that "there's so much momentum for it, now's the time." At this stage, original writers Andrew Norriss and Richard Fegen were working on a new script.

In 2018, a Comic Relief producer worked with Barrie in an unsuccessful attempt to include a Brittas Empire skit on the programme.

== Influence ==
The show has been credited with having an influence on Alan Partridge and The Office.

== Setting ==
Many of the interior scenes of the leisure centre were filmed at the BBC studios. The exterior shots and interior swimming pools of 'Whitbury New Town Leisure Centre' were filmed at Ringwood Leisure Centre, Hampshire. Other external locations such as the Brittas house were also filmed in Ringwood.
