= Mike Burns (actor) =

British actor

- Born: Michael Burns; 4 May 1952 (age 74); Bradford, West Riding of Yorkshire, England
- Occupation: Actor
- Years active: 1977–present
- Known for: Colin Weatherby in The Brittas Empire

Mike Burns (born 4 May 1952) is an English actor best known for his role as Colin Weatherby in the BBC leisure centre sitcom The Brittas Empire. His stage name was Michael Burns, from his first on-screen credit in 1977 until mid-1993, including in the first three series of The Brittas Empire, and Mike Burns from mid-1993 onward.

Born in Bradford, Burns played Colin Weatherby in the BBC leisure centre sitcom The Brittas Empire. It ran for 52 episodes in over 6 years on BBC1 from 3 January 1991 to 24 February 1997. He also appeared in Heartbeat, Lovejoy and Emmerdale Farm amongst many others. In October 2006 he appeared in Emmerdale once more, as a security expert.

== Television ==
- Play for Today (1 episode, 1983)
- Blott on the Landscape (1 episode, 1985)
- Auf Wiedersehen, Pet (1 episode, 1986)
- Yesterday's Dreams (1 episode, 1987)
- Hi-de-Hi! (1 episode, 1987)
- Lovejoy (1 episode, 1991)
- The Brittas Empire (52 episodes, 1991–1997)
- Get Fit with Brittas (2 episodes, 1997)
- Emmerdale Farm (2 episodes, 1998)
- Heartbeat (1 episode, 1999)
- Casualty (1 episode, 2003)
- Hollyoaks: In the City (1 episode, 2006)
- The Royal Today (1 episode, 2008)
- Everything But the Ball (2009)
