= Pippa Haywood =

British actress

- Born: Philippa Jane Haywood; Hatfield, Hertfordshire, England
- Occupation: Actress
- Years active: 1986–present
- Spouse: Malcolm V Newberry
- Children: 2

Philippa Jane Haywood is an English actress. She won the 2005 Rose d'Or Award for Best Female Comedy Performance for Green Wing (2004–2006). Her other television credits include The Brittas Empire (1991–1997), Chimera (1991), Prisoners' Wives (2012–2013) and Scott & Bailey (2012–2016), and (2018) Bodyguard. In 2019, she appeared in series 4 of the BBC Radio 4 Show The Pin.

== Early life and education ==
Haywood was born in Hatfield, Hertfordshire. She attended Hatfield Girls’ Grammar School and trained at the Bristol Old Vic Theatre School.

== Career ==
=== Television ===
Haywood has an extensive television career which includes portraying the much put-upon Helen Brittas in the BBC One comedy series The Brittas Empire (1991–1997), Mrs Kitchen in the CITV animated series Budgie the Little Helicopter (1994–1996), Julie Chadwick in the 2007 BBC Two comedy Fear, Stress & Anger, and the hot-tempered, sex-mad human resources director Joanna Clore in Green Wing (2004–2006), for which she won the "best comedy female performance" award at the 2005 Rose d'Or television festival in Lucerne, Switzerland.

Though Haywood is credited as "Philippa Haywood" in her earliest acting appearances, since the second episode of series 2 of The Brittas Empire in 1992 she has always been credited as "Pippa Haywood". She has also appeared in many dramatic roles, including Jenny Thorne in the 1988 ITV drama serial The One Game, and Mrs. Upjohn in the 2008 Agatha Christie's Poirot episode "Cat Among the Pigeons". In 2002, Haywood was a guest star in the last episode of the first series of The Inspector Lynley Mysteries.

In 2007, she played Veronica Gray in the first episode of the second series of Lewis. She appeared in the 2008 ITV period drama series Lost in Austen as Amanda Price’s mother, Frankie. She also had a guest role in a 2009 episode of Kingdom, and portrayed the disgraced Miss Bunting in several episodes of the first series of Mr Selfridge (2013). Since 2012, she has played one of the lead roles, Harriet, on the BBC One drama Prisoners' Wives, and co-starred as Detective Superintendent Julie Dodson on the ITV drama series Scott & Bailey. In 2014, she appeared in the BBC TV adaptation of E.F. Benson's Mapp and Lucia, as Susan Wyse.

In 2015, Haywood took over as Helen Golightly in the long-running BBC Radio 4 comedy Clare in the Community, the character having been previously played by Liza Tarbuck. In December 2016, she starred in an episode of Midsomer Murders, alongside Hugh Dennis.

In 2017, Haywood appeared in the 2017 version of the British TV sitcom Porridge as Governor Hallwood.

In 2018, Haywood appeared in Bodyguard as Chief Superintendent Lorraine Craddock, and in Agatha and the Truth of Murder. In the same year, she played gambling-addicted the Reverend Miss Grace in an episode of Agatha Raisin.

In 2020, Haywood appeared in Father Brown in series eight, episode two, "The Queen Bee", as a revenge-filled murderer, Eileen Slither. She also appeared in two episodes of Feel Good as the newly divorced mother Felicity.

Haywood also appeared in the Netflix series Bridgerton as the Duke of Hastings' housekeeper, Mrs. Colson. She has performed on several audio dramas, including Doctor Who stories for Big Finish Productions, and the podcast Forest 404 (2019) with Pearl Mackie.

In 2022, Haywood appeared as Claire Jenkins in the TV adaptation of Anthony Horowitz's book Magpie Murders.

In 2023, Haywood appeared as a judge in the mini-series Best Interests.

Also in 2023, Haywood played Gillian Compton for two episodes of The Chelsea Detective.

She also appeared in Goodnight Sweetheart as Ron's boss Mrs Flanagan in the 1998 episode "Pennies from Heaven".

=== Film and theatre ===
Haywood has also worked in film and theatre. Recent stage credits include House & Garden, Private Lives, A Midsummer Night's Dream, The Winter's Tale, Requiem and Landscape with Weapon at the National Theatre. She played the lead role in Wanderlust at the Royal Court Jerwood Theatre Upstairs. In 2020m she appeared as Sam, the sister of Colin Firth's character, in Supernova.

== Personal life ==
Haywood is married to Malcolm Newberry and the couple have two children. They live in Gillingham, Dorset.
