= Judy Flynn =

British actress

- Occupation: Actress
- Years active: 1988—present

Judy Flynn is a British actress. She is known for her roles as seamstress Madge Howell in the BBC drama The House of Eliott (1991–94), and as the secretary Julie in the BBC sitcom The Brittas Empire (1992–97). Her other television credits include two episodes of the Victoria Wood comedy dinnerladies (1999), and two episodes of Talking Friends (2012) on Disney.com.

== Filmography ==
- First of the Summer Wine (1988-1989) as Lena
- The House of Eliott (1991- 1994) as Madge Howell/Althorpe
- The Brittas Empire (1992-1997) as Julie
  - Get Fit with Brittas (1997) as Julie
- The Bill
  - "Stolen Moments" (1996) as Linda Roberts
  - "Blood Rush: Part 1" (2008) as Jeanette Smith
- Heartbeat
  - "Kindness of Strangers" (1999) as Jenny
  - "No Man's Land" (2002) as Judy Parnaby
  - "Bully Boys" (2008) as Angie Lomax
- Holby City
  - "Care" (2001) as Julia Powell
  - "7 Days Later" (2005) as Maureen Rogers
  - "Actions Speak Louder" (2005) as Maureen Rogers
  - "Overload" (2005) as Maureen Rogers
  - "Leap of Faith" (2007) as Meg West
- Hetty Wainthropp Investigates ”Mind Over Muscle” (1998) as Sonia
- Dinnerladies (Two episodes, 1999) as Val
- Dalziel and Pascoe episode: "The Price of Fame" (2004) as Karen Clark
- Who Gets the Dog? (2007) as Sue Sullivan
- Doctors
  - "See You in the Morning" (2007) as Penny Mitchum
  - "Power of Speech" (2010) as Jenny Prew
  - "Cheer Up Sleepy Genes" (2012) as Trudy Benedict
  - "Tough Love" (2015) as Marie Lissimore
  - "Crossing Palms" (2017) as Lyn Buckley
  - "Crashing Down" (2020) as Monica Levenson
- Peppa Pig (2009–2017) as Mummy Dog, Mrs. Cow, Auntie Pig and Police Officer Squirrel, Mummy Cat, Mummy Polar Bear
- Ben & Holly's Little Kingdom (2009) as Mrs. Elf and Gloria Gnome
- Fast Freddie, The Widow and Me (2011) as Kathy
- Shameless (2012) as Daniella Feeney
- Talking Friends (2012) as Robot
- Millie Inbetween (2016) as Mrs. Knope
- Call the Midwife (2017) as Ada Ward
- Ackley Bridge (2018) as Barbara Hammer
- Hollyoaks (2019) as Mrs Maloney
- Ellis (TV Series) (Two Episodes, 2026) as Wendy Pyke

== Radio ==
The Blackburn Files (BBC Radio, 1989-1993) as Tracey Duggan
