= Catrin Collier =

Welsh novelist

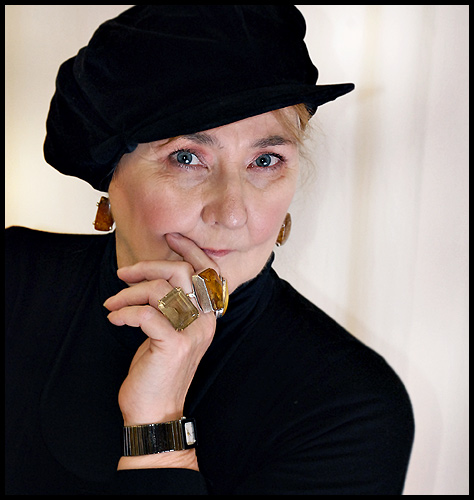
- Born: Karen Jones; 1948 (age 77–78); Pontypridd, Wales
- Other names: Karen Watkins; Katherine John; K. A. John; Katherine Hardy; Caro French
- Occupation: Novelist
- Agent: Marjacq Scripts
- Catrin Collier's voice Recorded June 2013
- Website: catrincollier.co.uk

Karen Watkins (née Jones, born 1948), writing as Catrin Collier, is a Welsh novelist known for her historical works, especially those in the Hearts of Gold series, set in her home town of Pontypridd between 1930 and 1950, the first of which was adapted as a BBC drama in 2003. She also writes under the pen names Katherine John/ K. A. John (crime novels), Katherine Hardy (novelisations of television programmes) and Caro French (modern fiction).

== Early life ==
Collier is of East Prussian descent, with her mother, Gerda Salewski, born in Allenstein, East Prussia, in 1926. Her father, Glyn Jones, was a Welsh Guardsman serving in Germany when he met Gerda. They were married in Pontypridd in July 1947. Collier was born there in 1948 and grew up in the town.

As a comprehensive school teacher, she taught English and drama to A level in schools in Swansea and West Glamorgan.

== Career ==
Her book One last Summer is based on war-time diaries kept by her mother and maternal grandmother. and is recommended by the Holocaust Memorial Day Trust for young people wanting to learn about the Holocaust. It was a 2008 finalist for the Romantic Novelists' Association's Book of the Year.

== Television ==
In 2003, Hearts of Gold was adapted by BBC Wales as a two-part drama, directed by Richard Laxton and co-written by Matthew Baylis. BBC Wales' head of drama Matthew Robinson described her as "the Catherine Cookson of Wales".

== Other work ==
As well as novels, she writes short stories, plays and non-fiction, and has had work published in magazines including Woman, Woman's Own and Woman's Weekly.

== Personal life ==
After living in Germany and America, Collier now lives in Swansea near The Gower.

She is a member of Swansea Writers' Group, which encouraged her from the outset of her career before she had published a novel.

Ty Catrin, an adult education centre in Pontypridd, was named in her honour in 2002.

== Bibliography ==
Collier's work includes:

- 'Hearts of Gold' series
  - —— (1992). Hearts of Gold. Century. ISBN 978-0712646062.
  - —— (1993). One Blue Moon. Century. ISBN 978-0712698238.
  - —— (1994). A Silver Lining. Century. ISBN 978-0712658454.
  - —— (1995). All That Glitters. Century. ISBN 978-0712658508.
  - —— (1996). Such Sweet Sorrow. Century. ISBN 978-0712675086.
  - —— (1997). Past Remembering. Century. ISBN 978-0712675130.
  - —— (1998). Broken Rainbows. Century. ISBN 978-0712679459.
  - —— (2000). Spoils of War. Century. ISBN 978-0712684736.
  - —— (2008). Magda's Daughter. Orion. ISBN 978-0752885858.
  - —— (2011). Bobby's Girl. Allison & Busby. ISBN 978-0749009298.
- Swansea trilogy
  - —— (2001). Swansea Girls. Orion. ISBN 978-0752832326.
  - —— (2002). Swansea Summer. Orion. ISBN 978-0752832340.
  - —— (2003). Homecoming. Orion. ISBN 978-0752853116.
- 'Beggars & Choosers' series
  - —— (2003). Beggars & Choosers. Orion. ISBN 978-0752853130.
  - —— (2004). Winners & Losers. Orion. ISBN 978-0752853154.
  - —— (2004). Sinners & Shadows. Orion. ISBN 978-0752866987.
  - —— (2005). Finders & Keepers. Orion. ISBN 978-0752867007.
- —— (2009). Black Eyed Devils. Accent Press. ISBN 978-1906373610.
- Tiger Bay
  - —— (2006). Tiger Bay Blues. Orion. ISBN 978-0752867021.
  - —— (2006). Tiger Ragtime. Orion. ISBN 978-0752867045.
- —— (2007). One Last Summer. Orion. ISBN 978-0752885773.
- Long Road To Baghdad series
  - 1995 Long Road to Baghdad, Accent Press ISBN 9781072934638
  - 1995 Winds of Eden, Accent Press, ISBN 978-1-0730-4321-7
  - 1995 Scorpion Sunset Accent Press ISBN 978-1-0733-1446-1
  - The Tsar's Dragons Series
    - 2019 The Tsar's Dragons Accent Press ISBN 978-1-0713-9901-9
    - 2019 Princes and Peasants, Accent Press, ISBN 978-1-0730-4321-7
    - 2019 A Dragons' Legacy Accent Press ISBN 978-1-0728-0901-2
  - Glyndwr Series
    - 2019 Book 1 Glyndwr The Foretold Son Independent ISBN 978-1-0972-6147-5
    - 2020 Book 2 Glyndwr Glorious Shall Their Dragon Be ISBN 979-8-6836-6956-0
    - 2021 Book 3 My Child's Child To Weep ISBN 979-8-7737-6902-6
    - 2022 Glyndwr 4 When Warriors Go To Die ISBN 979-8-3257-4948-3
- For Elise
- For Elise 2025 Independent Published ISBN 97982962482668

=== As Katherine John ===
- 'Trevor Joseph' series:
  - —— (1990). Without Trace. Century. ISBN 978-0712634472.
  - —— (1993). Six Foot Under. Headline. ISBN 978-0747207290. (aka Midnight Murders)
  - —— (1994). Murder of a Dead Man. Headline. ISBN 978-0747240471.
  - —— (2006). The Corpse's Tale. Accent Press. ISBN 978-1905170319.
  - —— (2006). Midnight Murders. Accent Press. ISBN 978-1905170272. (aka Six Foot Under)
  - —— (2008). Black Daffodil. Accent Press. ISBN 978-1906125004.
  - —— (2008). A Well Deserved Murder. Accent Press. ISBN 978-1906125141.
  - —— (2010). Destruction of Evidence. Accent Press. ISBN 978-1906373832.
- —— (1995). By Any Other Name. Headline. ISBN 978-0747212188. (aka By Any Name)
- —— (2007). The Amber Knight. ISBN 978-1905170623.
- —— (1995). The Vanished (2nd ed.). UK: Accent Press. ISBN 9781072052852.

==== As K. A. John ====
- —— (2011). Wake Wood. Hammer. ISBN 978-0099556183.

=== As Katherine Hardy ===
- 'The Grand'
  - —— (1997). The Grand. Simon & Schuster. ISBN 978-0671005191.
  - —— (1999). The Grand II - Under New Management. Simon & Schuster. ISBN 978-0671015961.
- —— (2004). Coronation Street: The Complete Saga. Granada Media. ISBN 9780233000879.

=== As Caro French ===
- The Farcreek Trilogy
  - —— (1995). Lady Luck (Farcreek 1). Pocket Books. ISBN 978-0671853563.
  - —— (1995). Lady Lay (Farcreek 2). Pocket Books. ISBN 978-0671853570.
  - —— (1995). Lady Chance (Farcreek 3). Pocket Books. ISBN 978-0671853587.
