= 'Allo 'Allo! series 7 =

'Allo 'Allo!
- Series 7
- No. of episodes: 10

Release
- Original network: BBC1
- Original release: 5 January – 16 March 1991

Series chronology
- ← Previous; Series 6 Next → Series 8

The seventh series of the British sitcom series 'Allo 'Allo! contains ten episodes which first aired between 5 January and 16 March 1991.

There is a gap of fifteen months between the broadcasting dates of series 6 and 7. Gorden Kaye suffered serious head injuries in a car accident in January 1990; causing him to lose some of his memory. As Kaye was slow to make a full recovery, the whole show's future was in doubt. Even when the seventh series did come about, it brought some changes. David Croft left the series, with Paul Adam taking over the co-writing; Mike Stephens became the producer for the show; Robin Parkinson took over the role of Ernest LeClerc from Derek Royle, who had died in 1990; Roger Kitter replaced Gavin Richards as Bertorelli; and the series also saw the reappearance of Sam Kelly as Captain Hans Geering, though only for one episode.

Unlike in previous series, there was no exclamation mark when the title "'Allo 'Allo" was shown on screen.

The following episode names are the ones found on the British R2 DVDs, with alternate region titles given below them.

== Cast ==
- Gorden Kaye as René Artois
- Carmen Silvera as Edith Artois
- Rose Hill as Madame Fanny La Fan
- Vicki Michelle as Yvette Carte-Blanche
- Sue Hodge as Mimi Labonq
- Kirsten Cooke as Michelle Dubois
- Robin Parkinson as Monsieur Ernest LeClerc
- Kenneth Connor as Monsieur Alfonse
- Richard Marner as Colonel Kurt von Strohm
- Guy Siner as Lieutenant Hubert Gruber
- Roger Kitter as Captain Alberto Bertorelli
- Hilary Minster as General Erich von Klinkerhoffen
- Richard Gibson as Herr Otto Flick
- John Louis Mansi as Herr Engelbert von Smallhausen
- Kim Hartman as Private Helga Geerhart
- Arthur Bostrom as Officer Crabtree
- John D. Collins as Officer Fairfax
- Nicholas Frankau as Officer Carstairs

== Episodes ==
No. overall	No. in series	Title	Directed by	Written by	Original release date
62	1	"A Quiet Honeymoon"	Mike Stephens	Jeremy Lloyd and Paul Adam	5 January 1991
The newlyweds return to the cafe on a stolen motorbike, having evaded German roadblocks. General Von Flockenstuffen announces he is replacing General Von Klinkerhoffen due to the latter's nervous breakdown.: Note: This episode marks the first appearance of Robin Parkinson as Ernest LeClerc.; Note: This episode marks the first appearance of Roger Kitter as Captain Bertorelli.; Alternative title: "Forged Papers"
63	2	"An Almighty Bang"	Sue Longstaff	Jeremy Lloyd and Paul Adam	12 January 1991
After their escape from custody, the newlyweds hide in a secret compartment in the cafe, but then find they are trapped. General Von Flockenstuffen is determined that the Nouvion garrison will play a bigger part in the war. In response, the Germans and Bertorelli decide to spring General Von Klinkerhoffen from hospital and return him to his post.: Note: This episode marks the last appearance of Ken Morley as General Von Flockenstuffen.; Alternative title: "Exploding Candles"
64	3	"Fleeing Monks"	Mike Stephens	Jeremy Lloyd and Paul Adam	26 January 1991
General Von Klinkerhoffen wants to award René with a medal. Under pressure from all sides, René decides once again to elope with Yvette – this time to England. What could go wrong?: Alternative title: "Flying To England"
65	4	"Up the Crick Without a Piddle"	Sue Longstaff	Jeremy Lloyd and Paul Adam	2 February 1991
In London, René and Edith meet up with an old friend enjoying a new life. However they must return to Nouvion, and do so just in time to avoid the mandatory interrogation for persons missing for over 24 hours.: Note: In the episode before this, Herrs Flick and Von Smallhausen are deprived of their spectacles, which are even crushed, since they are not allowed any worldly goods in the monastery. However, in this episode, they have recovered their spectacles (although the lenses are mostly smashed).; Note: In this episode, Sam Kelly makes a one-occasion special appearance as Captain Hans Geering. This is the last time he appears on the show.; Alternative title: "René in England"
66	5	"The Gestapo Ruins a Picnic"	Mike Stephens	Jeremy Lloyd and Paul Adam	9 February 1991
General Von Klinkerhoffen wants to resurrect Nouvion's local newspaper as a propaganda tool.: Alternative title: "Telegraph Poles"
67	6	"The Spirit of Nouvion"	Sue Longstaff	Jeremy Lloyd and Paul Adam	16 February 1991
Herr Flick's possession of the painting is of interest to several parties.
68	7	"Leg it to Spain!"	Mike Stephens	Jeremy Lloyd and Paul Adam	23 February 1991
René is determined to flee to Spain in disguise, while Michelle is testing another plan to repatriate the British Airmen, this time with the help of wine barrels destined for the coast.: Alternative title: "Wine Barrels"
69	8	"Prior Engagements"	Sue Longstaff	Jeremy Lloyd and Paul Adam	2 March 1991
Edith is celebrated as the Spirit of Nouvion in the local newspaper, and is under orders to marry Bertorelli to cement relations between the locals and the occupying forces.: Alternative title: "A Mixed Marriage"
70	9	"Soup and Sausage"	Mike Stephens	Jeremy Lloyd and Paul Adam	9 March 1991
The British Airmen are still in the town sewers. Helga goes on a training course and is replaced by Private Elsa Bigstern.: Alternative title: "Ice Cream"; Note: Madame Fanny La Fan does not appear in this episode.
71	10	"René of the Gypsies"	Sue Longstaff	Jeremy Lloyd and Paul Adam	16 March 1991
It's the day of the annual Gypsy Fair in Nouvion, providing yet another distraction to Michelle's latest plan to help the British Airmen.: Note: When being implied that she is 47, Edith says she is 36, despite jokingly stating in a previous episode that she is nearly 27.; Note: This episode marks the last appearance of Roger Kitter as Captain Bertorelli.; Note: This episode marks the last regular appearance of John D. Collins and Nicholas Frankau as the British airmen Fairfax and Carstairs. They would however make a one-off appearance in the very last episode (A Winkle in Time).; Note: Madame Fanny La Fan does not appear in this episode.; Alternative title: "Gypsies"
