= 'Allo 'Allo! series 6 =

'Allo 'Allo!
- Series 6
- No. of episodes: 8

Release
- Original network: BBC1
- Original release: 2 September – 21 October 1989

Series chronology
- ← Previous; Series 5 Next → Series 7

The sixth series of the British television sitcom 'Allo 'Allo! contains eight episodes which first aired between 2 September and 21 October 1989.

Series 6 and subsequent episodes were 30 minutes in length, as they were not co-commissioned for the American market (as series 5 was). Jack Haig was originally meant to star in the series; but his death before the start of production prevented this. As the LeClerc character was important to the series, Derek Royle was brought in to play the part of Ernest LeClerc, Roger's brother. Naturally, the two characters are very similar in the roles that they play within the show's plot. The show also features the last appearance of Gavin Richards as Bertorelli who would be recast by Roger Kitter and Ernest would later be recast by Robin Parkinson.

The following episode names are the ones found on the British R2 DVDs with alternate region titles given below them.

== Cast ==
- Gorden Kaye as René Artois
- Carmen Silvera as Edith Artois
- Rose Hill as Madame Fanny La Fan
- Vicki Michelle as Yvette Carte-Blanche
- Sue Hodge as Mimi Labonq
- Kirsten Cooke as Michelle Dubois
- Derek Royle as Monsieur Ernest LeClerc
- Kenneth Connor as Monsieur Alfonse
- Richard Marner as Colonel Kurt von Strohm
- Guy Siner as Lieutenant Hubert Gruber
- Gavin Richards as Captain Alberto Bertorelli
- Hilary Minster as General Erich von Klinkerhoffen
- Richard Gibson as Herr Otto Flick
- John Louis Mansi as Herr Engelbert von Smallhausen
- Kim Hartman as Private Helga Geerhart
- Arthur Bostrom as Officer Crabtree
- John D. Collins as Officer Fairfax
- Nicholas Frankau as Officer Carstairs

== Episodes ==
No. overall	No. in series	Title	Directed by	Written by	Original release date
54	1	"Desperate Doings in the Graveyard"	David Croft	Jeremy Lloyd & David Croft	2 September 1989
LeClerc's brother Ernest has swapped places with him, and is now the resident pianist and object of Madame Fanny's affections. The Resistance are constructing a communications hub in the empty grave of René's twin brother.: Note: This episode marks the first appearance of Derek Royle as Ernest LeClerc.; Alternative title: "The Ghost of René"
55	2	"The Gestapo for the High Jump"	David Croft	Jeremy Lloyd & David Croft	9 September 1989
The Gestapo plan to infiltrate the Resistance by posing as British Airmen, for which they undertake English language lessons via gramophone, with interesting results.: Alternative title: "It's Raining Italians"
56	3	"The Nouvion Oars"	Martin Dennis	Jeremy Lloyd & David Croft	16 September 1989
Madame Fanny discusses her wedding plans with Edith, while Helga tries to seduce Herr Flick with an eye to marriage.: Alternative title: "The Goose and the Submarine"
57	4	"The Nicked Airmen"	Martin Dennis	Jeremy Lloyd & David Croft	23 September 1989
The British Airmen have been captured by the Germans, and there are plans from several quarters to spring them.: Alternative title: "Playing Dead Again"
58	5	"The Airmen De-Nicked"	Martin Dennis	Jeremy Lloyd & David Croft	30 September 1989
Helga gets Flick and Von Smallhousen out of a tricky situation. The latest Resistance plan to infiltrate the chateau ends with René and Edith being handcuffed to the British Airmen.: Alternative title: "Intelligence Officers"
59	6	"The Crooked Fences"	Martin Dennis	Jeremy Lloyd & David Croft	7 October 1989
Herr Flick and the German officers turn their attention back to the paintings (and their forgeries), the cuckoo clock, and the stolen gold.: Alternative title: "The Fence"
60	7	"Crabtree's Podgeon Pist"	Martin Dennis	Jeremy Lloyd & David Croft	14 October 1989
Madame Fanny and Ernest's wedding provides the ideal cover for Michelle's latest scheme to get the British Airmen back to England.: Note: In this episode, (at 26:22) the priest reveals Ernest's middle name to be "Dipstick".; Note In this episode, (at 26:36) the priest reveals Fanny's middle name to be "Now You See It, Now You Do Not".; Note: This is the only time in the entire series where Captain Bertorelli says the "Heil Hitler" salute correctly.; Alternative title: "Fanny's Wedding"
61	8	"Rising to the Occasion"	Martin Dennis	Jeremy Lloyd & David Croft	21 October 1989
Following the wedding ceremony, General Von Klinkerhoffen wants to blow up the town, so the German officers call on General Von Flockenstuffen.: Note: When doing the speeches, Rene accidentally makes some people believe that Fanny was born in 1789.; Note: This episode marks the last appearance of Derek Royle as Ernest LeClerc (Royle would die in 1990, between series 6 and 7).; Note: This episode marks the last appearance of Gavin Richards as Captain Bertorelli.; Alternative title: "The Flying Bed"
