= 'Allo 'Allo! series 4 =

'Allo 'Allo!
- Series 4
- No. of episodes: 6

Release
- Original network: BBC1
- Original release: 7 November – 12 December 1987

Series chronology
- ← Previous; Series 3 Next → Series 5

The fourth series of the British sitcom 'Allo 'Allo! contains six episodes, which first aired between 7 November and 12 December 1987.

Series 4 marks the final regular appearance of Sam Kelly as Captain Hans Geering; though he returned for a one-off special appearance in Series 7. Francesca Gonshaw left at the end of the third series; though the exit of her character, Maria, is not explained until the second episode of this series. This series also sees the first appearances of Sue Hodge as Mimi Labonq in the third episode, as the new café waitress; and in the same episode Gavin Richards as Captain Alberto Bertorelli, the seconded Italian captain.

The following episode names are those found on the British Region 2 DVD releases, with alternate region titles given below them.

== Cast ==
- Gorden Kaye as René Artois
- Carmen Silvera as Edith Artois
- Rose Hill as Madame Fanny La Fan
- Vicki Michelle as Yvette Carte-Blanche
- Sue Hodge as Mimi Labonq (Episodes 3-6)
- Kirsten Cooke as Michelle Dubois
- Jack Haig as Monsieur Roger LeClerc
- Kenneth Connor as Monsieur Alfonse
- Richard Marner as Colonel Kurt von Strohm
- Guy Siner as Lieutenant Hubert Gruber
- Sam Kelly as Captain Hans Geering (Episodes 1-2)
- Gavin Richards as Captain Alberto Bertorelli (Episodes 3-6)
- Hilary Minster as General Erich von Klinkerhoffen
- Richard Gibson as Herr Otto Flick
- John Louis Mansi as Herr Engelbert von Smallhausen
- Kim Hartman as Private Helga Geerhart
- Arthur Bostrom as Officer Crabtree
- John D. Collins as Officer Fairfax
- Nicholas Frankau as Officer Carstairs

== Episodes ==
No. overall	No. in series	Title	Directed by	Written by	Original release date
22	1	"Prisoners of War"	David Croft & Martin Dennis	Jeremy Lloyd & David Croft	7 November 1987
The cafe staff, Michelle, Von Strohm and Geering are trapped in the prisoner-of-war camp. The Gestapo try to tunnel in, Helga and Gruber try to sneak into the camp to rescue their friends, while the inmates are planning their own escape.: Note: Since Francesca Gonshaw left after series 3, Maria is not in this episode. However, her absence is not explained until the next episode.; Note: The prisoner-of-war camp is called Stalag Luft IV. That camp is in Poland.; Note: In this episode, the show's timeline is revealed to be 1941.; Alternative title: "Hans Goes over the Top".
23	2	"Camp Dance"	David Croft & Martin Dennis	Jeremy Lloyd & David Croft	14 November 1987
The cafe staff, the Germans, and Michelle manage to escape thanks to the combined diversionary tactics of the camp entertainments and Gruber's refuse truck – but they find they have a couple of stowaways. Maria is not with them, having tried to escape through the post as a Red Cross parcel, but has been sent back to Switzerland due to insufficient postage. Captain Geering, having escaped over the wall, eventually manages to send a radio message – from London.: Note: This episode is unique, in that it does not start with the standard theme tune, but instead with the music the gang are dancing to.; Note: Although Sam Kelly does not physically appear in this episode, he has a handful of lines of audio dialogue as Geering.
24	3	"Good Staff Are Hard to Find"	David Croft & Martin Dennis	Jeremy Lloyd & David Croft	21 November 1987
Captain Geering is replaced by the Italian Captain Bertorelli. Maria is replaced, not by one of the many nubile young applicants for the post René favours, nor by the very elderly woman applicant Edith and Yvette favour, but by Mimi Labonq, a Resistance fighter and former gang leader, under Michelle's orders.: Note: In the office, Captain Bertorelli tells General von Klinkerhoffen that he has a medal for fighting in Abyssinia. Ethiopia was generally known as Abyssinia in Europe until the mid-twentieth century. It was occupied by Italy from 1936 until 1941.; Note: This episode features the first appearance of Sue Hodge as Mimi Labonq.; Note: This episode features the first appearance of Gavin Richards as Captain Alberto Bertorelli.
25	4	"The Flying Nun"	David Croft & Martin Dennis	Jeremy Lloyd & David Croft	28 November 1987
Herr Flick decides to bug the Colonel's office – with a daffodil. The Resistance must take action as their radio signal is being jammed by the Gestapo, which leads to Mimi hanging off the line of a kite while disguised as a nun.
26	5	"The Sausages in the Trousers"	David Croft	Jeremy Lloyd & David Croft	5 December 1987
Without batteries to power the radio in the attic bedroom, René and Yvette must provide pedal power attached to a generator. René amasses a collection of sausages – some real, one containing a forged painting, and some containing explosives.: Note: Even though René is the third person to appear in this episode, Gorden Kaye is first in the "cast in order of appearance" list at the end of it.
27	6	"The Jet-Propelled Mother-In-Law"	David Croft & Martin Dennis	Jeremy Lloyd & David Croft	12 December 1987
General Von Klinkerhoffen has commandeered Monsieur Alfonse's vineyard and the locals are ordered to harvest the grapes. The RAF has dropped a spy camera, which has landed in the vineyard. The Resistance decide that the harvesting is the ideal opportunity to rescue the camera, and to assassinate the General.
