= 'Allo 'Allo! series 2 =

'Allo 'Allo!
- Series 2
- No. of episodes: 7

Release
- Original network: BBC1
- Original release: 21 October – 26 December 1985

Series chronology
- ← Previous; Series 1 Next → Series 3

The second series of the British sitcom 'Allo 'Allo! contains seven episodes, which first aired between 21 October and 26 December 1985.

Series 2 sees the arrival of Officer Crabtree, played by Arthur Bostrom, and the Gestapo officer Herr Engelbert Von Smallhausen, played by John Louis Mansi. The first Christmas special was commissioned, and aired shortly after the second series. This shows the-then rising popularity of the show.

The following episode names are those found on the British Region 2 DVD releases, with alternate region titles given below them.

== Cast ==
- Gorden Kaye as René Artois
- Carmen Silvera as Edith Artois
- Rose Hill as Madame Fanny La Fan
- Vicki Michelle as Yvette Carte-Blanche
- Francesca Gonshaw as Maria Recamier
- Kirsten Cooke as Michelle Dubois
- Jack Haig as Monsieur Roger LeClerc
- Kenneth Connor as Monsieur Alfonse
- Richard Marner as Colonel Kurt von Strohm
- Guy Siner as Lieutenant Hubert Gruber
- Sam Kelly as Captain Hans Geering
- Hilary Minster as General Erich von Klinkerhoffen
- Richard Gibson as Herr Otto Flick
- John Louis Mansi as Herr Engelbert von Smallhausen
- Kim Hartman as Private Helga Geerhart
- Arthur Bostrom as Officer Crabtree
- John D. Collins as Officer Fairfax
- Nicholas Frankau as Officer Carstairs

== Episodes ==
No. overall	No. in series	Title	Directed by	Written by	Original release date
9	1	"Six Big Boobies"	David Croft	Jeremy Lloyd & David Croft	21 October 1985
Edith is enjoying her new-found status as a rich widow, since the reading of René's will leaves almost everything to her. The British Airmen disguise themselves as nuns and hide out in the nearby convent. Gruber is summoned to the Gestapo headquarters to identify the real painting of the Fallen Madonna from two forgeries, and blackmailed into keeping quiet about his task.: Note: Edith finds Rene's will in a cuckoo clock in this episode, despite stating in The Funeral (the episode after his "death") that she had already found it in the bureau of her mother's dressing room (although upon hearing the news, Rene said that there might be another one).; Anachronism: As Rene peruses the business cards procured by Edith during her jaunt, he declares one of the cards is for Dyno-Rod, a company which was not founded until 1963.
10	2	"The Wooing of Widow Artois"	David Croft	Jeremy Lloyd & David Croft	28 October 1985
René is ordered to hide the real painting in his cafe, concealed in a knockwurst sausage. Herr Flick has a private dinner at the cafe with Helga, while the cafe staff and the Resistance are making plans to meet a plane due to land in a nearby field that night.: Note: This episode introduces the flashing knobs on Fanny's bed as a way of indicating that London is calling on the radio.; Note: This episode introduces the idea of the paintings being hidden in knockwursts, which became a big theme running through the whole series.
11	3	"The Policeman Cometh"	David Croft	Jeremy Lloyd & David Croft	4 November 1985
The Resistance, the cafe staff, and the British Airmen (disguised as a cow) venture out to meet the plane in the middle of the night. However, it does not land – a British intelligence officer parachutes out and gets caught up in a tree. The man, dressed as a Gendarme, introduces himself as Crabtree, and that he's been sent over because he speaks French – although he's not as fluent to French ears as he obviously believes himself to be. Back at the cafe, Madame Fanny is determined to enjoy "freebies" now that her daughter owns the cafe, and René must blow up a train under the Colonel's orders, to make Hitler think that the painting of the Fallen Madonna, expected to be on the train, has been destroyed.: Note: This episode marks the first appearance of Officer Crabtree.
12	4	"Swiftly and with Style"	David Croft	Jeremy Lloyd & David Croft	11 November 1985
Having failed to blow up the train, René and Captain Geering head back to the cafe in Gruber's little tank. They end up surrendering to the Resistance at a roadblock, who flee when they see a Gestapo staff car approaching. While everyone is gathering round to discern what has happened, Herr Flick manages to blow up his own car. Next day, Michelle arrives at the cafe with the latest plan to help the British Airmen escape: a hot-air balloon was dropped by the same plane which dropped Crabtree, but it needs silk – in the form of women's knickers – to repair it so it is airworthy. To cover their tracks, René explains to the Germans that the silk is needed for Edith's wedding dress, but is overheard by Monsieur Alfonse, who challenges René to a duel in response.: Note: In this episode, officer Crabtree's catchphrase "Good moaning" can be heard for the first time.
13	5	"The Duel"	David Croft	Jeremy Lloyd & David Croft	18 November 1985
Plans for the duel are in place – Gruber has put himself forward as one of René's seconds, while Edith is selling tickets for the front row and preparing the catering. The German officers plan to hold manoeuvres in the vicinity of the duel, which might "accidentally" hit Monsieur Alfonse. On the morning of the duel, René augments his clothing with a coal scuttle as armour under his suit. Just as they are about to begin, Gruber receives a message that Von Strohm and Geering have been arrested by the Gestapo and the manoeuvres are cancelled. René sees no option but to run.: Note: This episode marks the first appearance of Engelbert Von Smallhausen. Even though Herr Flick calls him "Von Smallhausen", he is only credited as "Gestapo man" in the credits.
14	6	"Herr Flick's Revenge"	David Croft	Jeremy Lloyd & David Croft	25 November 1985
René is discovered by the Resistance while hiding from Monsieur Alfonse, and they disguise him as a Resistance girl. They also explain to Alfonse how brave René is and how important he and the cafe are to their cause, leading Alfonse to see René as a hero of France. Gruber sees through René's disguise in the cafe but vows not to give him away, but does so unintentionally and he is arrested by Von Smallhousen and held prisoner in the dungeon alongside the Colonel and the Captain. Gruber decides to go over Herr Flick's head and calls in General Von Klinkerhoffen to extricate the three prisoners. Once René is back home, the wind is favourable, so the cafe staff and the Resistance can venture outside the town to launch the balloon with the British Airmen inside, disguising themselves as a funeral party to get through the curfew.: Note: When general Von Klinkerhoffen arrives in the dungeon, Hans gives the full "Heil Hitler" salute (the first of only four times in the entire TV series).; Note: In this episode, Von Smallhausen gives his first name as "Englebert", although in the episode "Dinner with the General", (while being hypnotised) he gives his full name as "Bobby Cedric Von Smallhausen".; Note: At the time of the episode's production, it was thought unlikely that the show would be renewed for a third season, so the main cast's goodbye waves to the airmen also served as their goodbye to the audience. But a third season was commissioned, and the show ran for nine seasons in all.
15	7	"The Gâteau from the Château"	David Croft	Jeremy Lloyd & David Croft	26 December 1985
The cafe staff return home after the balloon's launch, only for the balloon to be shot down by General Von Klinkerhoffen and his troops. The balloon crash-lands in the attic bedroom. Following the incident, Von Klinkerhoffen remains in the area and assumes control, with Gruber installed as his ADC. The General plans a party at the chateau to celebrate the Kaiser's birthday, as he is a distant relation. The Resistance, the German officers, and the Gestapo see this as the ideal situation to assassinate the General. However, the Gestapo discover the Resistance are plotting to blow up the chateau, so the party moves to the cafe, leaving René much less keen on the Resistance's plans.: Note: Although this episode was broadcast soon after series 2, it is featured on the series 3 and 4 region 2 DVD boxset. In the region 1 area, this episode is featured on the series 2 DVD (at least sometimes under the title "Klinkerhoffen in Control").
