= 'Allo 'Allo! series 5 =

'Allo 'Allo!
- Series 5
- No. of episodes: 26

Release
- Original network: BBC1
- Original release: 3 September 1988 – 25 February 1989

Series chronology
- ← Previous; Series 4 Next → Series 6

The fifth series of the British sitcom 'Allo 'Allo! contains twenty-six episodes, which first aired between 3 September 1988 and 25 February 1989.

Series 5 is longer than any of the other series, and contains almost a third of the total number of episodes. The series was made with a view to airing the show in the US, so episodes were shortened to 25 minutes rather than 30 minutes to allow for commercial breaks; and twenty-six episodes were commissioned to tie in with the American tradition of having "seasons", rather than the typical British "series" of six to eight episodes. Due to these changes, two episodes were written by different writers; the director's role was shared among four people, the series was taped entirely in the studio (except the wedding scene of Episode 6, which was shot on location in an actual church); and not all of the secondary characters appear in each of the series' episodes. Series 5 also sees the first appearances of the Communist Resistance girls Denise Laroque and Louise; and the last appearance of Jack Haig (who died in the time between the fifth and sixth series) as Monsieur Roger LeClerc.

The following episode names are those found on the British Region 2 DVD releases, with alternate region titles given below them.

== Cast ==
- Gorden Kaye as René Artois
- Carmen Silvera as Edith Artois
- Rose Hill as Madame Fanny La Fan
- Vicki Michelle as Yvette Carte-Blanche
- Sue Hodge as Mimi Labonq
- Kirsten Cooke as Michelle Dubois
- Jack Haig as Monsieur Roger LeClerc
- Kenneth Connor as Monsieur Alfonse
- Richard Marner as Colonel Kurt von Strohm
- Guy Siner as Lieutenant Hubert Gruber
- Gavin Richards as Captain Alberto Bertorelli
- Hilary Minster as General Erich von Klinkerhoffen
- Richard Gibson as Herr Otto Flick
- John Louis Mansi as Herr Engelbert von Smallhausen
- Kim Hartman as Private Helga Geerhart
- Arthur Bostrom as Officer Crabtree
- John D. Collins as Officer Fairfax
- Nicholas Frankau as Officer Carstairs

== Episodes ==
No. overall	No. in series	Title	Directed by	Written by	Original release date
28	1	"Desperate Doings in the Dungeon"	David Croft	Jeremy Lloyd, David Croft	3 September 1988
Herr Flick is in the dungeon, but there are plans afoot from several sources to spring him - although not necessarily leave him a free man. The Resistance manage to be first on the scene and effect a prisoner swap.: Alternative title: "The Rescue of Frau Kinkenrotten"
29	2	"The Camera in the Potato"	Martin Dennis	Jeremy Lloyd, David Croft	10 September 1988
René is rescued from the dungeon, and is tasked with photographing invasion plans, hidden in a safe in the chateau.: Note: Rose Hill (Fanny La Fan), John D. Collins (Fairfax) and Nicholas Frankau (Carstairs), London Calling and Voice of 'Gibson' are credited in the end credits, even though they do not appear in the episode.; Alternative title: "Eyes of the Potato"
30	3	"Dinner with the General"	Martin Dennis	Jeremy Lloyd, David Croft	17 September 1988
Smoke bombs will provide a diversionary tactic to distract Gruber so René can photograph the invasion plans, but they end up being sent down the wrong chimney. Helga and Von Klinkerhoffen dine together, while the Gestapo infiltrate as a musical interlude to gain intelligence on plans to assassinate Hitler.: Note: In this episode, when being hypnotised, Von Smallhausen gives his full name as "Bobby Cedric von Smallhausen", although in "Herr Flick's Revenge", he gives his first name as "Englebert".; Alternative title: "Criminal Developments"
31	4	"The Dreaded Circular Saw"	Martin Dennis	Jeremy Lloyd, David Croft	24 September 1988
Everyone gets a surprise when the safe is blown up by LeClerc. As everyone flees the chateau, René and LeClerc - disguised as German soldiers - are captured by the Communist Resistance.: Note: In this episode, Rose Hill is once again credited without appearing and Kirsten Cooke (Michelle) is credited as the second person to appear on screen, even though it is actually Jack Haig (LeClerc) who does so.; Note: As the general threatens Gruber with being sent to the Russian front, he says "you could find yourself in Vladivostok by the end of the week". This is either a joke or a lapsus on the creators' part, since Vladivostok is on the Russian east coast, which the Germans were never even close to reaching during the entire war.; Note: This episode features the first appearances of Moira Foot as Denise Laroque, and of Carole Ashby as Louise.; Alternative title: "Return of the Paintings"
32	5	"Otherwise Engaged"	Martin Dennis	Jeremy Lloyd, David Croft	1 October 1988
René and LeClerc are still being held at the sawmill by the Communist Resistance. Their leader announces she and René are to be married very soon.: Note: In this episode, one of the communist resistance girls is played by Phoebe Scholfield, who has earlier played Henriette, one of Michelle's resistance girls.; Alternative title: "Enter Denise"
33	6	"A Marriage of Inconvenience"	Martin Dennis	Jeremy Lloyd, David Croft	8 October 1988
It's the day of René and Denise's wedding - except the Gaullist Resistance and the cafe staff have plans in place to ensure the two are not betrothed.: Note: Once again, the airmen actors are credited without appearing in the episode.; Note: Kim Hartman (Helga) is credited as number four, even though she is the ninth person to appear in frame.; Alternative title: "Wedding Plans"
34	7	"No Hiding Place"	Susan Belbin	Jeremy Lloyd, David Croft	15 October 1988
In the fallout from their wedding day, René tries to hide from Denise and her plans for revenge, but the people of Nouvion are not as accommodating as René would like. A ticking package is delivered to the cafe by a clock repair man (John Rutland).: Note: When the people in the café are about to share the wine, the acid spot on the table can be seen even before the wine has been poured.; Note: Richard Gibson and John Louis Mansi are credited in the opposite order that they appear in the episode.; Note: Crabtree's talk with the British airmen is one of the few occasions that he speaks English in the series.; Alternative title: "Post-Matrimonial Depression"
35	8	"The Arrival of the Homing Duck"	Susan Belbin	Jeremy Lloyd, David Croft	22 October 1988
A conference is planned by the occupying forces, where the invasion of England is likely to be under discussion. Michelle orders René to provide the catering while gathering information on the plans, with the resulting intelligence to be sent to England via a duck.: Alternative title: "The Long Distance Duck"
36	9	"Watch the Birdie"	Susan Belbin	Jeremy Lloyd, David Croft	29 October 1988
The conference goes ahead, despite the duck escaping and being shot down. A serving of peppermints provides the necessary diversion for René to photograph the invasion plans.: Note: This episode marks the first appearance of Ken Morley as general Leopold Von Flockenstuffen.; Alternative title: "The Generals Conference"
37	10	"René - Under an Assumed Nose"	Susan Belbin	Jeremy Lloyd, David Croft	5 November 1988
In the aftermath of the conference, René is on the General's hit list following the incident with the peppermints.: Alternative title: "Michelle's Secret Love"
38	11	"The Confusion of the Generals"	Susan Belbin	Jeremy Lloyd, David Croft	12 November 1988
The cafe finds itself the location of a meeting between a group of German Generals, disguised as French onion-sellers. It's also the scene of a meeting of more shot-down British airmen.: Alternative title: "The British Invasion"
39	12	"Who's for the Vatican"	Susan Belbin	Jeremy Lloyd, David Croft	19 November 1988
René is ordered to steal the paintings from the headquarters of the Communist Resistance.: Alternative title: "Parade of Prams"
40	13	"Ribbing the Bonk"	Martin Dennis	Jeremy Lloyd, David Croft	26 November 1988
René must rob a bank to raise the ransom to pay the Communist Resistance to free Mimi, Gruber, the Colonel, and Bertorelli.: Note: In this episode, Michelle's codename when calling London on the radio is revealed to be "Bluetit".; Alternative title: "The Bank Job"
41	14	"The Reluctant Millionaires"	Martin Dennis	Jeremy Lloyd, David Croft	3 December 1988
René and the cafe staff have money from robbing the bank, but Michelle puts a spanner in the works. Mimi manages to escape and return to Nouvion.: Note: In this episode John D. Collins and Nicholas Frankau (the British airmen) are credited without appearing.; Note: In this episode, Colonel Strohm's age is revealed to be 47, meaning that he must have been born in 1893 or 1894.; Alternative title: "Communists in the Cupboard"
42	15	"A Duck for Launch"	Martin Dennis	Jeremy Lloyd, David Croft	10 December 1988
Everyone is trying to get their hands on the money, for a variety of reasons. The duck is ready to leave for England, but René would rather it remain with its ducklings.: Note: In this episode, Rene's age is revealed to be 32, meaning he must have either been born in 1909 or 1910.; Alternative title: "Forged Francs and Fishsellers"
43	16	"The Exploding Bedpan"	Martin Dennis	Jeremy Lloyd, David Croft	17 December 1988
Monsieur Alphonse has been arrested by the Gestapo after being caught passing forged banknotes. Fortunately a glimpse of Helga's stockings strains his "dicky ticker" and he's rushed to hospital. The cafe staff and the Resistance must rescue him before the Gestapo can interrogate him.: Alternative title: "L'Hospital"
44	17	"Going Like a Bomb"	Martin Dennis	Jeremy Lloyd, David Croft	24 December 1988
The Colonel sets up Bertorelli in an attempt to be rid of him. Michelle has another plan to help the British Airmen return home, with the help of the casing from a new type of bomb. LeClerc has yet another new disguise.: Note: This episode features the final appearance of Moira Foot as Denise Laroque.; Alternative title: "Feathers"
45	18	"Money to Burn"	Martin Dennis	Jeremy Lloyd, David Croft	31 December 1988
LeClerc has been arrested by the Gestapo and they threaten to shoot him if the missing money is not returned.: Alternative title: "Leclerc Against the Wall"
46	19	"Puddings Can Go Off"	Martin Dennis	Jeremy Lloyd, David Croft	7 January 1989
The Resistance are in possession of a thousand kilograms of explosives which were originally in the bomb casings. René is charged with hiding the explosives, which will be disguised as 500 Christmas puddings.: Note: In this episode, we once again find Phoebe Scholfield playing one of Michelle's resistance girls, after she has played a communist resistance girl a few episodes earlier.; Alternative title: "Christmas Puddings"
47	20	"Land Mines for London"	Richard Boden	Jeremy Lloyd, David Croft	14 January 1989
The Gestapo discover the whereabouts of the landmines and decide to lie in wait in order to arrest the Resistance members collecting them.: Note: This episode contains an anachronism. When Fanny is complaining about the British, Edith says "Mama, I always thought you voted conservative!" This episode is set sometime during the time 1941-1943 and French women were not allowed to vote until 1944 and 1945.; Note: René tells Yvette that he is twenty years older than her.; Note: This episode contains two people (the two German airmen) in the same shot during the 'You have been watching (In order of appearance)' credit sequence.; Alternative title: "Mines Away"
48	21	"Flight to Geneva"	Richard Boden	Jeremy Lloyd, David Croft	21 January 1989
René decides to elope to Switzerland with Yvette and the paintings.: Note: The shot of the train leaving the station was taken from the 1974 film Murder on the Orient Express.; Note: René says he is nearly twenty years older than Yvette.; Alternative title: "All Abroad"
49	22	"Train of Events"	Richard Boden	Jeremy Lloyd, David Croft	28 January 1989
René's plans have gone awry, and the train is full of people after the paintings for their own ends.: Alternative title: "The Geneva Express"
50	23	"An Enigma Variation"	Richard Boden	Jeremy Lloyd, David Croft	4 February 1989
René and his staff must impersonate a musical group at the chateau. René's attempts to disguise stolen gold don't work as well as he hoped, and Crabtree gives his own unique rendition of a popular French song.: Alternative title: "Enigma"
51	24	"Wedding Bloss"	Richard Boden	John Chapman, Ian Davidson	11 February 1989
René and Edith are heading for the altar, while Michelle initiates Operation Waterloo, the latest plan to return the British Airmen to England.: Alternative title: "Renewing the Vows"
52	25	"Down the Drain"	Richard Boden	Ronald Wolfe, Ronald Chesney	18 February 1989
René must deliver the Enigma machine to a waiting British submarine, via Nouvion's sewer system. His resurrected plan to elope with Yvette interferes with the objective of the mission.: Note: In this episode, Richard Gibson (Otto Flick), Kim Hartman (Helga), John Louis Mansi (Von Smallhausen) and Gavin Richards (Captain Bertorelli) are credited without appearing.; Alternative title: "The Big Flush"
53	26	"All in Disgeese"	Richard Boden	Jeremy Lloyd, David Croft	25 February 1989
Another plan to get the Enigma machine safely into the hands of British intelligence sees a plethora of disguises from the usual quarters, with varying success, as the Germans are equally determined to get their hands on it too.: Note: In this episode, Edith's middle name is revealed to "Melba".; Note: In this episode, Yvette's surname is revealed to be "Carte-Blanche".; Note: In this episode, Yvette claims she is 19 during an interrogation, meaning she must either have been born in 1922, or 1921 according to her claimed statement, as this episode was set in 1941.; Note: In this episode, Mimi reveals she is 18 during an interrogation, meaning she have been born in either 1922 or 1923 according to her claimed statement.; Note: In this episode, Edith "reveals" that she is nearly 27 during an interrogation. It would mean she must have been born in 1913 according to her claimed statement.; (On the date the episode originally aired, the actresses playing Yvette, Mimi, and Edith were 38, 31, and 66 respectively, and this is also likely the actual ages in the show.): Note: This episode marks the last appearance of Jack Haig as Roger LeClerc, since Haig would die a few months later, before the beginning of series 6.; Note: The two English agents appeared in the same end card. (You have been watching (In order of appearance)).; Alternative title: "Enigma's End"
