= 'Allo 'Allo! series 3 =

'Allo 'Allo!
- Series 3
- No. of episodes: 6

Release
- Original network: BBC1
- Original release: 5 December 1986 – 9 January 1987

Series chronology
- ← Previous; Series 2 Next → Series 4

The third series of the British sitcom 'Allo 'Allo! contains six episodes, which first aired between 5 December 1986 and 9 January 1987.

Series 3 features the final appearance of Francesca Gonshaw as Maria Recamier.

The following episode names are those found on the British Region 2 DVD releases, with alternate region titles given below them.

== Cast ==
- Gorden Kaye as René Artois
- Carmen Silvera as Edith Artois
- Rose Hill as Madame Fanny La Fan
- Vicki Michelle as Yvette Carte-Blanche
- Francesca Gonshaw as Maria Recamier
- Kirsten Cooke as Michelle Dubois
- Jack Haig as Monsieur Roger LeClerc
- Kenneth Connor as Monsieur Alfonse
- Richard Marner as Colonel Kurt von Strohm
- Guy Siner as Lieutenant Hubert Gruber
- Sam Kelly as Captain Hans Geering
- Hilary Minster as General Erich von Klinkerhoffen
- Richard Gibson as Herr Otto Flick
- John Louis Mansi as Herr Engelbert von Smallhausen
- Kim Hartman as Private Helga Geerhart
- Arthur Bostrom as Officer Crabtree
- John D. Collins as Officer Fairfax
- Nicholas Frankau as Officer Carstairs

== Episodes ==
| No. overall | No. in series | Title | Directed by | Written by | Original release date |
|---|---|---|---|---|---|
| 16 | 1 | "The Nicked Knockwurst" | David Croft | Jeremy Lloyd & David Croft | 5 December 1986 |
The Communist Resistance steal Herr Flick's sausage (containing a forged copy of the Fallen Madonna) from the cafe, demanding a ransom for its return. René delivers the money, observed secretly by other parties, all in disguise – the cafe staff as German soldiers, Colonel Von Strohm and Captain Geering as trees, Helga and the Gestapo as Resistance girls, and German soldiers as Gendarmes. The sausage ends up in the mouth of Gruber's dog.: Note: This episode marks the beginning of Von Smallhausen's regular appearance on the show.
| 17 | 2 | "Gruber Does Some Mincing" | Robin Carr & David Croft | Jeremy Lloyd & David Croft | 12 December 1986 |
Gruber (and his refrigerator) have been apprehended and brought before the Gestapo, leading Herr Flick to discover that his painting was a forgery. Michelle has a plan to send the British Airmen back to England in an old airplane, currently in the museum, powered by the engine from General Von Klinkerhoffen's lawnmower.
| 18 | 3 | "The Sausage in the Wardrobe" | Robin Carr & David Croft | Jeremy Lloyd & David Croft | 19 December 1986 |
Maria is sent to the chateau with a knockwurst, containing the real painting, concealed across her bosom for Gruber to create another forgery. Von Klinkerhoffen intercepts her, hangs the sausage in his wardrobe, and sends a message that she will remain in his rooms until his lawnmower engine is returned. As word gets around of their location, the cafe staff, Gruber, and the Gestapo enact their plans to retrieve the sausage and rescue Maria.: Note: In this episode, Maria's surname is revealed to be "Recamier".
| 19 | 4 | "Flight of Fancy" | Robin Carr & David Croft | Jeremy Lloyd & David Croft | 26 December 1986 |
Following her escape, Maria is hiding around the cafe disguised as a young boy. A classic vehicle parade, led by Gruber in his little tank, has been arranged – this will clear the museum of enough vehicles to enable the airplane to be used. However, it needs a catapult launch – for which all the men in Nouvion have agreed to give up their trouser braces.: Note: This episode is approximately ten minutes longer than a standard episode, as it was broadcast as an unofficial Boxing Day Special.; Note: This is the second of four times in the entire TV series when Hans Geering can be heard giving the full "Heil Hitler" salute.
| 20 | 5 | "Pretty Maids All in a Row" | Robin Carr & David Croft | Jeremy Lloyd & David Croft | 2 January 1987 |
Back at the cafe, the British Airmen have been disguised as new waiting staff. General Von Klinkerhoffen commandeers their services for the chateau, along with a painting behind a curtain, which contains the Fallen Madonna inside. An elaborate Flamenco Night is staged to "kill off" the new staff so they are not found out.: Note: This is the third of four times in the entire TV series when Hans Geering can be heard giving the full "Heil Hitler" salute (to General von Klinkerhoffen).
| 21 | 6 | "The Great Un-Escape" | Robin Carr & David Croft | Jeremy Lloyd & David Croft | 9 January 1987 |
The airmen, having been taken to the mortuary after their "deaths", are tunnelling into the nearby prisoner-of-war camp. The cafe staff must help them, but the Gestapo have been listening in on René's radio conversations with London. The prisoners are tunnelling from their end, and as the two tunnels meet, the cafe staff, Michelle, Von Strohm, and Geering are in the tunnel behind the airmen. The Colonel gets stuck, but freeing him causes the tunnel to collapse behind him and everyone is stuck in the prisoner-of-war camp – just as General Von Klinkerhoffen is about to perform an inspection.: Note: This episode features the last appearance of Francesca Gonshaw as Maria Recamier.; Note: This is the fourth time in the entire TV series when Hans Geering can be heard giving the full "Heil Hitler" salute (to Colonel).
