= 'Allo 'Allo! series 1 =

'Allo 'Allo!
- Series 1
- No. of episodes: 7

Release
- Original network: BBC1
- Original release: 7 September – 26 October 1984

Series chronology
- Next → Series 2

The pilot of the British television sitcom 'Allo 'Allo! was originally broadcast on 30 December 1982. It was repeated as the first of a series of seven episodes broadcast from 7 September to 26 October 1984.

The following episode names are those that are found on the British Region 2 DVD releases, with alternative region titles given below them.

== Cast ==
- Gorden Kaye as René Artois
- Carmen Silvera as Edith Artois
- Rose Hill as Madame Fanny La Fan
- Vicki Michelle as Yvette Carte-Blanche
- Francesca Gonshaw as Maria Recamier
- Kirsten Cooke as Michelle Dubois
- Jack Haig as Monsieur Roger LeClerc
- Kenneth Connor as Monsieur Alfonse
- Richard Marner as Colonel Kurt von Strohm
- Guy Siner as Lieutenant Hubert Gruber
- Sam Kelly as Captain Hans Geering
- Hilary Minster as General Erich von Klinkerhoffen
- Richard Gibson as Herr Otto Flick
- Kim Hartman as Private Helga Geerhart
- John D. Collins as Officer Fairfax
- Nicholas Frankau as Officer Carstairs

== Episodes ==
No. overall	No. in series	Title	Directed by	Written by	Original release date
2	1	"The British 'ave Come"	David Croft	Jeremy Lloyd & David Croft	7 September 1984
René has the painting of the Fallen Madonna bricked up in his cellar. He has the idea of having a forgery of the painting made, to give to the Gestapo on the pretence it is the original. René ends up with a collection of suicide pills.: Alternative title: "The Fallen Madonna"
3	2	"Pigeon Post"	David Croft	Jeremy Lloyd & David Croft	14 September 1984
The British Airmen are captured by the Communist Resistance, having escaped in the German officers' uniforms. Replacement uniforms are to be ordered from London, via carrier pigeon.: Note: This episode is the first in which René speaks to the audience.
4	3	"Savile Row to the Rescue"	David Croft	Jeremy Lloyd & David Croft	21 September 1984
René waits for the plane to drop the German uniforms, but it lands and a tailor is on board. Michelle gives René nitroglycerine to hide – disguised in a gin bottle, and René suddenly finds everyone has a taste or a use for the "gin".: Note: The only time that Carmen Silvera is listed first and Gorden Kaye second in the end credits.
5	4	"The Execution"	David Croft	Jeremy Lloyd & David Croft	28 September 1984
General Von Klinkerhoffen survives an assassination attempt when the Resistance attempt to blow up the train delivering him to Nouvion. For his part in the operation, René is sentenced to be executed by firing squad, but Colonel Von Strohm has a plan to ensure his survival.: Note: This episode has the first appearance of Hilary Minster as General Erich von Klinkerhoffen.
6	5	"The Funeral"	David Croft	Jeremy Lloyd & David Croft	5 October 1984
René begins posing as his own twin brother, also named René, as his "funeral" is arranged. René hides the Resistance's anti-tank mines in the coffin, and LeClerc poses as the priest.: Note: This episode has the first appearance of Kenneth Connor as Alfonse.
7	6	"Reds Nick Colonel"	David Croft	Jeremy Lloyd & David Croft	19 October 1984
After celebrating his birthday at the cafe, Colonel Von Strohm is captured by the Communist Resistance, along with Captain Geering. The Resistance give René the honour of shooting them in revenge for his twin brother's demise. They all escape and meet the plane with the forged painting of the Fallen Madonna, but it inevitably gets mixed up with the original.: Note: This episode's title is often misspelled as "Red Nick's Colonel".
8	7	"The Dance of Hitler Youth"	David Croft	Jeremy Lloyd & David Croft	26 October 1984
René is ordered to switch the paintings before Herr Flick can send the original to Berlin. A Hitler Youth Dance in the cafe provides a diversion.
