= List of 'Allo 'Allo! episodes =

The following is a list of episodes for the British sitcom 'Allo 'Allo! that aired from 1982 to 1992. Following the Pilot in 1982, the series was officially launched two years later in 1984 (Series 1) and continued to Series 9 (1992); including two Christmas Special episodes in 1985 (between Series 2 and 3) and in 1991 (between Series 7 and 8). The last series (Series 9) was followed by two retrospective episodes in 1994 (The Best of 'Allo 'Allo!) & 2007 (The Return of 'Allo 'Allo!). In total, including the Pilot, the two Christmas Specials and the two post series retrospective episodes; there are 87 episodes. Dates shown are original air dates on BBC One (except for The Return of 'Allo 'Allo! episode which was broadcast on BBC Two).

== Series overview ==
Series	Episodes	Originally released	
Series	Episodes	First released	Last released
Pilot		30 December 1982	
1	7	7 September 1984	26 October 1984
2	7	21 October 1985	26 December 1985
3	6	5 December 1986	9 January 1987
4	6	7 November 1987	12 December 1987
5	26	3 September 1988	25 February 1989
6	8	2 September 1989	21 October 1989
7	10	5 January 1991	9 March 1991
8	8	24 December 1991	1 March 1992
9	6	9 November 1992	14 December 1992

== Episodes ==
=== Pilot (1982) ===
Pilot
No. overall	No. in series	Title	Directed by	Written by	Original release date
1	0	"The British Are Coming"	David Croft	David Croft and Jeremy Lloyd	30 December 1982
René Artois owns his own café in Nouvion, northern France, during the German occupation of World War Two. His main day-to-day concerns should be ensuring that he doesn't displease the local German army personnel, and ensuring his wife does not suspect his affairs with his younger waitresses. But the local leader of the Resistance declares the café is to become a safe house for the hiding of two RAF pilots, shot down and without uniforms - or a word of the French language. He is also to welcome a forger, recently busted from jail, into the café - who happens to be an old flame of his bedridden mother-in-law.: Note: In this episode, the painting is referred to as The Reclining Madonna with the Big Boobies. In all later episodes, it is called The Fallen Madonna with the Big Boobies.; Note: In this episode, Michelle claims to be a member of 'Lifeline' - a reference to the same organization in Secret Army.; Note: This pilot episode runs at 35 minutes, which was often common practice for BBC comedy pilots of the era. A slightly edited down version, running at just under the more standard 30 minutes, also exists, used for some repeat broadcasts and, primarily, for overseas markets such as America, to suit the standard half-hour format.

- Produced by David Croft

=== Series 1 (1984) ===
No. overall	No. in series	Title	Directed by	Written by	Original release date
2	1	"The British 'ave Come"	David Croft	Jeremy Lloyd and David Croft	7 September 1984
3	2	"Pigeon Post"	David Croft	Jeremy Lloyd and David Croft	14 September 1984
4	3	"Savile Row to the Rescue"	David Croft	Jeremy Lloyd and David Croft	21 September 1984
5	4	"The Execution"	David Croft	Jeremy Lloyd and David Croft	28 September 1984
6	5	"The Funeral"	David Croft	Jeremy Lloyd and David Croft	5 October 1984
7	6	"Reds Nick Colonel"	David Croft	Jeremy Lloyd and David Croft	19 October 1984
8	7	"The Dance of Hitler Youth"	David Croft	Jeremy Lloyd and David Croft	26 October 1984

=== Series 2 (1985) ===
No. overall	No. in series	Title	Directed by	Written by	Original release date
9	1	"Six Big Boobies"	David Croft	Jeremy Lloyd and David Croft	21 October 1985
10	2	"The Wooing of Widow Artois"	David Croft	Jeremy Lloyd and David Croft	28 October 1985
11	3	"The Policeman Cometh"	David Croft	Jeremy Lloyd and David Croft	4 November 1985
12	4	"Swiftly and with Style"	David Croft	Jeremy Lloyd and David Croft	11 November 1985
13	5	"The Duel"	David Croft	Jeremy Lloyd and David Croft	18 November 1985
14	6	"Herr Flick's Revenge"	David Croft	Jeremy Lloyd and David Croft	25 November 1985
15	7	"The Gâteau from the Château"	David Croft	Jeremy Lloyd and David Croft	26 December 1985

=== Series 3 (1986–87) ===
No. overall	No. in series	Title	Directed by	Written by	Original release date
16	1	"The Nicked Knockwurst"	David Croft	Jeremy Lloyd and David Croft	5 December 1986
17	2	"Gruber Does Some Mincing"	Robin Carr and David Croft	Jeremy Lloyd and David Croft	12 December 1986
18	3	"The Sausage in the Wardrobe"	Robin Carr and David Croft	Jeremy Lloyd and David Croft	19 December 1986
19	4	"Flight of Fancy"	Robin Carr and David Croft	Jeremy Lloyd and David Croft	26 December 1986
20	5	"Pretty Maids All in a Row"	Robin Carr and David Croft	Jeremy Lloyd and David Croft	2 January 1987
21	6	"The Great Un-Escape"	Robin Carr and David Croft	Jeremy Lloyd and David Croft	9 January 1987

=== Series 4 (1987) ===
No. overall	No. in series	Title	Directed by	Written by	Original release date
22	1	"Prisoners of War"	David Croft and Martin Dennis	Jeremy Lloyd and David Croft	7 November 1987
23	2	"Camp Dance"	David Croft and Martin Dennis	Jeremy Lloyd and David Croft	14 November 1987
24	3	"Good Staff Are Hard to Find"	David Croft and Martin Dennis	Jeremy Lloyd and David Croft	21 November 1987
25	4	"The Flying Nun"	David Croft and Martin Dennis	Jeremy Lloyd and David Croft	28 November 1987
26	5	"The Sausages in the Trousers"	David Croft	Jeremy Lloyd and David Croft	5 December 1987
27	6	"The Jet-Propelled Mother-In-Law"	David Croft and Martin Dennis	Jeremy Lloyd and David Croft	12 December 1987

=== Series 5 (1988–89) ===
No. overall	No. in series	Title	Directed by	Written by	Original release date
28	1	"Desperate Doings in the Dungeon"	David Croft	Jeremy Lloyd and David Croft	3 September 1988
29	2	"The Camera in the Potato"	Martin Dennis	Jeremy Lloyd and David Croft	10 September 1988
30	3	"Dinner with the General"	Martin Dennis	Jeremy Lloyd and David Croft	17 September 1988
31	4	"The Dreaded Circular Saw"	Martin Dennis	Jeremy Lloyd and David Croft	24 September 1988
32	5	"Otherwise Engaged"	Martin Dennis	Jeremy Lloyd and David Croft	1 October 1988
33	6	"A Marriage of Inconvenience"	Martin Dennis	Jeremy Lloyd and David Croft	8 October 1988
34	7	"No Hiding Place"	Susan Belbin	Jeremy Lloyd and David Croft	15 October 1988
35	8	"The Arrival of the Homing Duck"	Susan Belbin	Jeremy Lloyd and David Croft	22 October 1988
36	9	"Watch the Birdie"	Susan Belbin	Jeremy Lloyd and David Croft	29 October 1988
37	10	"René - Under an Assumed Nose"	Susan Belbin	Jeremy Lloyd and David Croft	5 November 1988
38	11	"The Confusion of the Generals"	Susan Belbin	Jeremy Lloyd and David Croft	12 November 1988
39	12	"Who's for the Vatican"	Susan Belbin	Jeremy Lloyd and David Croft	19 November 1988
40	13	"Ribbing the Bonk"	Martin Dennis	Jeremy Lloyd and David Croft	26 November 1988
41	14	"The Reluctant Millionaires"	Martin Dennis	Jeremy Lloyd and David Croft	3 December 1988
42	15	"A Duck for Launch"	Martin Dennis	Jeremy Lloyd and David Croft	10 December 1988
43	16	"The Exploding Bedpan"	Martin Dennis	Jeremy Lloyd and David Croft	17 December 1988
44	17	"Going Like a Bomb"	Martin Dennis	Jeremy Lloyd and David Croft	24 December 1988
45	18	"Money to Burn"	Martin Dennis	Jeremy Lloyd and David Croft	31 December 1988
46	19	"Puddings Can Go Off"	Martin Dennis	Jeremy Lloyd and David Croft	7 January 1989
47	20	"Land Mines for London"	Richard Boden	Jeremy Lloyd and David Croft	14 January 1989
48	21	"Flight to Geneva"	Richard Boden	Jeremy Lloyd and David Croft	21 January 1989
49	22	"Train of Events"	Richard Boden	Jeremy Lloyd and David Croft	28 January 1989
50	23	"An Enigma Variation"	Richard Boden	Jeremy Lloyd and David Croft	4 February 1989
51	24	"Wedding Bloss"	Richard Boden	John Chapman and Ian Davidson	11 February 1989
52	25	"Down the Drain"	Richard Boden	Ronald Wolfe and Ronald Chesney	18 February 1989
53	26	"All in Disgeese"	Richard Boden	Jeremy Lloyd and David Croft	25 February 1989

=== Series 6 (1989) ===
No. overall	No. in series	Title	Directed by	Written by	Original release date
54	1	"Desperate Doings in the Graveyard"	David Croft	Jeremy Lloyd and David Croft	2 September 1989
55	2	"The Gestapo for the High Jump"	David Croft	Jeremy Lloyd and David Croft	9 September 1989
56	3	"The Nouvion Oars"	Martin Dennis	Jeremy Lloyd and David Croft	16 September 1989
57	4	"The Nicked Airmen"	Martin Dennis	Jeremy Lloyd and David Croft	23 September 1989
58	5	"The Airmen De-Nicked"	Martin Dennis	Jeremy Lloyd and David Croft	30 September 1989
59	6	"The Crooked Fences"	Martin Dennis	Jeremy Lloyd and David Croft	7 October 1989
60	7	"Crabtree's Podgeon Pist"	Martin Dennis	Jeremy Lloyd and David Croft	14 October 1989
61	8	"Rising to the Occasion"	Martin Dennis	Jeremy Lloyd and David Croft	21 October 1989

=== Series 7 (1991) ===
No. overall	No. in series	Title	Directed by	Written by	Original release date
62	1	"A Quiet Honeymoon"	Mike Stephens	Jeremy Lloyd and Paul Adam	5 January 1991
63	2	"An Almighty Bang"	Sue Longstaff	Jeremy Lloyd and Paul Adam	12 January 1991
64	3	"Fleeing Monks"	Mike Stephens	Jeremy Lloyd and Paul Adam	26 January 1991
65	4	"Up the Crick Without a Piddle"	Sue Longstaff	Jeremy Lloyd and Paul Adam	2 February 1991
66	5	"The Gestapo Ruins a Picnic"	Mike Stephens	Jeremy Lloyd and Paul Adam	9 February 1991
67	6	"The Spirit of Nouvion"	Sue Longstaff	Jeremy Lloyd and Paul Adam	16 February 1991
68	7	"Leg it to Spain!"	Mike Stephens	Jeremy Lloyd and Paul Adam	23 February 1991
69	8	"Prior Engagements"	Sue Longstaff	Jeremy Lloyd and Paul Adam	2 March 1991
70	9	"Soup and Sausage"	Mike Stephens	Jeremy Lloyd and Paul Adam	9 March 1991
71	10	"René of the Gypsies"	Sue Longstaff	Jeremy Lloyd and Paul Adam	16 March 1991

=== Series 8 (1991–92) ===
No. overall	No. in series	Title	Directed by	Written by	Original release date
72	1	"A Bun in the Oven"	John B. Hobbs	Jeremy Lloyd and Paul Adam	24 December 1991
73	2	"Arousing Suspicions"	John B. Hobbs	Jeremy Lloyd and Paul Adam	12 January 1992
74	3	"A Woman Never Lies"	John B. Hobbs	Jeremy Lloyd and Paul Adam	19 January 1992
75	4	"Hitler's Last Heil"	John B. Hobbs	Jeremy Lloyd and Paul Adam	26 January 1992
76	5	"Awful Wedded Wife"	John B. Hobbs	Jeremy Lloyd and Paul Adam	2 February 1992
77	6	"Firing Squashed"	John B. Hobbs	Jeremy Lloyd and Paul Adam	16 February 1992
78	7	"A Fishful of Francs"	John B. Hobbs	Jeremy Lloyd and Paul Adam	23 February 1992
79	8	"A Swan Song"	John B. Hobbs	Jeremy Lloyd and Paul Adam	1 March 1992

=== Series 9 (1992) ===
No. overall	No. in series	Title	Directed by	Written by	Original release date
80	1	"Gone with the Windmill" "Fighting with Windmills"	John B. Hobbs	Jeremy Lloyd and Paul Adam	9 November 1992
81	2	"A Tour de France" "Missing and Presumed Dead"	John B. Hobbs	Jeremy Lloyd and Paul Adam	16 November 1992
82	3	"Dead Man Marching" "René Artois Is Still Dead"	John B. Hobbs	Jeremy Lloyd and Paul Adam	23 November 1992
83	4	"Tarts and Flickers" "The Fishmonger Float"	John B. Hobbs	Jeremy Lloyd and Paul Adam	30 November 1992
84	5	"A Fishy Send-Off" "Sand Trap"	John B. Hobbs	Jeremy Lloyd and Paul Adam	7 December 1992
85	6	"A Winkle in Time" "The End of the War"	John B. Hobbs	Jeremy Lloyd and Paul Adam	14 December 1992

== Specials ==
=== The Best of 'Allo 'Allo! (1994) ===
No. overall	No. in series	Title	Directed by	Written by	Original release date
86	1	"The Best of 'Allo 'Allo!"	David Croft, Susan Belbin, Richard Boden, Martin Dennis, John B. Hobbs, Sue Longstaff and Mike Stephens	David Croft and Jeremy Lloyd	17 August 1994
René and Edith are in the Alps celebrating Edith's 35th birthday - Edith has knocked the war years off her true age, including World War I and the Crimean War! This event brings them to remember the incidents which took place during World War II; in particular the events which took place in their hometown of Nouvion. An episode that was made to celebrate the series' 10th anniversary. It is mainly made up of archive footage; but also features new scenes in which René and Edith renew their love for each other. These events take place after the war but before the final events (where Rene elopes) of the last Episode.

=== The Return of 'Allo 'Allo! (2007) ===
No. overall	No. in series	Title	Directed by	Written by	Original release date
87	1	"The Return of 'Allo 'Allo!"	Martin Dennis	Jeremy Lloyd	28 April 2007
A one-off special. René is writing his memoirs and needs help to fill in the "big gaps". Features some of the original cast reprising their roles; inter-worked with a documentary about the show's history.

== Notes ==
There remains some confusion over what the official titles are for each 'Allo 'Allo! episode (there were no onscreen titles for any episodes on the original transmission, though many episodes have had such titles added for repeat screenings and DVD releases, nor in Radio Times, though again the magazine has listed titles for some repeats). This had led to different DVD releases using different titles; and some fans have formed their own unofficial titles for episodes which have not yet been released on DVD. For the purposes of clarification, titles shown here are as follows:

- Series 1-7: These are the titles which appear on the British Region 2 DVD releases. Titles shown in brackets are where Region 1 and Region 4 DVD release titles do not correspond to those on the British Region 2 DVD release.
- Series 8-9: These are the titles which appear on the American Region 1 DVD releases. Series 8-9 and the second Christmas Special (under the title "Pregnancy") have been released on DVD in Poland, however with no titles, just notes on every episode.
