= The Return of 'Allo 'Allo! =

- No. of episodes: 1

Release
- Original network: BBC2
- Original release: 28 April 2007

The Return of 'Allo 'Allo! is a one-off special episode of the British sitcom 'Allo 'Allo!, which was broadcast on BBC Two on 28 April 2007. The special is mix of both a traditional episode, as well as a behind-the-scenes documentary featuring highlights from the sitcom and interviews with cast members, celebrity fans and production staff.

The in-episode storyline focuses on events in the 1950s, in which René is writing his memoirs after the war, and is revisited by several old faces. Gorden Kaye, Vicki Michelle, Sue Hodge, Kirsten Cooke, Arthur Bostrom, Guy Siner, Robin Parkinson, John D. Collins and Nicholas Frankau, while featuring in interviews in the documentary sections, reprised their original roles for the storyline; Sam Kelly and Richard Gibson, and Jeremy Lloyd also contributed to the episode.

== Plot ==
One day in the 1950s, following the end of World War II, cafe owner René Artois is spending his time quietly working on his memoirs within his cafe, and enjoying the peace that has come despite the drop in business when the Germans were defeated. Helped out by his waitress Yvette Carte-Blanche, René works to complete several details he has yet to fill in, and is surprised when he receives visitors. His first visitor, Michelle Dubois, arrives with a Légion d'honneur medal to reward him for his bravery during the war, which she reveals had fallen down a gap while working at Nouvion's post office, while inquiring about the memoir. His second visitor, Officer Crabtree, also inquires about the memoir, but reveals how he found life in France too good to consider returning to England after the war, particularly after becoming a "fluent" French speaker.

His next two visitors are Mimi Labonq, his former waitress who left the cafe during the war, and Ernest LeClerc, his former pianist, who reveal that the pair married after LeClerc won a fortune in Monte Carlo. Although saddened, René takes an opportunity to embrace Mimi in her husband's absence, before managing to lie his way out of discovery when LeClerc nearly catches them together. His final visitor is Hubert Gruber, a former lieutenant in the German army who now serves as a chauffeur for Mimi and LeClerc. Gruber states that while he is happy with his life, he still misses René.

After completing his memoirs, René admits to the viewers and audience how much his life has changed since the German occupation of Nouvion. Upon learning he is finished, Yvette decides to invite his old friends in to toast his memoir's completion with wine. Joined by the British pilots Fairfax and Carstairs, the party enjoy their drinks.

== Cast ==
- Gorden Kaye as René Artois
- Vicki Michelle as Yvette Carte-Blanche
- Sue Hodge as Mimi Labonq
- Kirsten Cooke as Michelle Dubois
- Arthur Bostrom as Officer Crabtree
- Guy Siner as Lieutenant Hubert Gruber
- Robin Parkinson as Monsieur Ernest LeClerc
- John D. Collins as Officer Fairfax
- Nicholas Frankau as Officer Carstairs
- Richard Gibson as Himself
- Sam Kelly as Himself
