= The British Are Coming (disambiguation) =

"The British are coming" is a phrase misattributed to Paul Revere's Midnight Ride.

The British Are Coming may also refer to:

- "The British Are Coming" (song), by Weezer, 2014
- "The British Are Coming" ('Allo 'Allo!), 1982 television pilot episode
- "The British Are Coming" (Dynasty), 2021 television episode
