= Sarah Parkinson =

Writer for TV and radio

- Born: Sarah Jane Parkinson; 6 June 1962
- Died: 23 September 2003 (aged 41)
- Occupations: Writer, producer, actress
- Spouse: Paul Merton (m. 2003)
- Father: Robin Parkinson

Sarah Jane Parkinson (6 June 1962 – 23 September 2003) was an English producer and writer of radio and television programmes, as well as an occasional actress. She was a regular performer on Week Ending in the final years of its run.

She was the daughter of actor Robin Parkinson and the second wife of comedian and writer Paul Merton.

Parkinson was diagnosed with breast cancer in February 2002. She and Merton had an unofficial marriage in the Maldives in 2000 before marrying at Rye Town Hall, East Sussex, in June 2003.

After her death, Merton released the following statement through his agent: "After her initial devastating diagnosis of cancer in February 2002 Sarah successfully lived with the disease for the next 19 months. She refused chemotherapy because she knew it would finish her off. Instead, she boosted her immune system with a mixture of nutritional therapy, yoga, meditation, positive thinking and laughter. Consequently she led a full and active life right up to the last couple of weeks when her condition suddenly worsened."
