= 'Allo 'Allo! =

British TV sitcom (1982–1992)

- 'Allo 'Allo! intertitle of "Puddings Can Go Off"
- Genre: Sitcom
- Created by: Jeremy Lloyd; David Croft
- Written by: Jeremy Lloyd; David Croft (1982–1989); Paul Adam (1991–1992); John Chapman (1989); Ian Davidson (1989); Ronald Chesney (1989); Ronald Wolfe (1989)
- Directed by: David Croft; Robin Carr; Martin Dennis; Susan Belbin; Richard Boden; Mike Stephens; Sue Longstaff; John B. Hobbs
- Starring: Gorden Kaye; Carmen Silvera; Vicki Michelle; Richard Marner; Guy Siner; Kim Hartman; Richard Gibson; Kirsten Cooke; Rose Hill; Jack Haig; John D. Collins; Nicholas Frankau; Sam Kelly; Francesca Gonshaw; Hilary Minster; Kenneth Connor; Arthur Bostrom; John Louis Mansi; Sue Hodge; Gavin Richards; Derek Royle; Robin Parkinson; Roger Kitter; David Janson
- Country of origin: United Kingdom
- Original language: English
- No. of series: 9
- No. of episodes: 85 (list of episodes)

Production
- Producers: David Croft; Mike Stephens; John B. Hobbs
- Running time: Appx 25–45 mins
- Production company: BBC

Original release
- Network: BBC1
- Release: 30 December 1982 – 14 December 1992

'Allo 'Allo! is a British sitcom television series, created by David Croft and Jeremy Lloyd, starring (among others) Gorden Kaye, Carmen Silvera, Vicki Michelle, Richard Marner, Guy Siner, Kim Hartman and Richard Gibson. Originally broadcast on BBC1, the series focuses on the life of a French café owner in the town of Nouvion, during the German occupation of France in World War II, in which he deals with problems from a dishonest German officer, local French Resistance, the handling of a stolen painting and a pair of trapped British airmen, all while concealing from his wife the affairs he is having with his waitresses.

Croft and Lloyd devised the concept as a parody of BBC wartime drama Secret Army and initially launched the programme with a pilot on 30 December 1982. The sitcom was eventually commissioned following the success of the pilot and ran for nine series between 7 September 1984 until its conclusion on 14 December 1992. Both Lloyd and Croft wrote the scripts for the first six series, while the remainder were handled by Lloyd and Paul Adam. Much like previous sitcoms created by Croft and Lloyd, the programme employed notable elements such as memorable catchphrases and ending credits, cultural clichés, physical humour, and visual gags. However, 'Allo 'Allo! differed from these other sitcoms by featuring overarching plot lines rather than simple stand-alone stories, as well as the device of having actors speaking English but with theatrical foreign accents to distinguish each character's nationality.

The sitcom gained strong ratings during its run, with its success leading to it receiving stage show reproductions. A special entitled The Return of 'Allo 'Allo!, aired on 22 March 2007, featured cast members returning to reprise their original roles to perform in a special story set a few years after the conclusion of the programme. It was accompanied by a documentary about the sitcom, including a highlight reel of episodes and interviews with the cast, production team and fans.

== Premise ==
'Allo 'Allo! is set during World War II, between the occupation of France by German Axis powers in 1940 and its eventual liberation by Allied forces in September 1944. The story of the sitcom focuses on René Artois, a café owner in Nouvion and a reluctant member of the town's local French Resistance cell who operates under the codename of "Nighthawk". Because of the occupation of the town by German forces, led by the dictatorial Major-General Erich von Klinkerhoffen, René finds himself caught up between dealing with four problems – the scheme and plots of the town's corrupt commandant, Colonel Kurt von Strohm; the sabotage plans of the Resistance's leader Michelle Dubois; the efforts by Gestapo agent Herr Otto Flick to find a stolen painting and unmask Resistance members; and the love affairs with his waitresses, particularly Yvette Carte-Blanche, each of which he must conceal from both his wife Edith Artois and each of the other waitresses.

Throughout the programme's broadcast, the sitcom features a number of overarching storylines, with two of these being the most conspicuous. The first, and most prominent, concerns the theft of a valuable painting from the town's chateau – The Fallen Madonna by fictional artist van Klomp (it is usually referred to as "The Fallen Madonna with the Big Boobies") – stolen by von Strohm, and the subsequent efforts by him to conceal the theft from his superiors and Herr Flick. René is notably forced into handling the stolen painting under threat of execution, but also due to being indebted to von Strohm for allowing him to fake his death when he is sentenced to execution for unjustified accusations of aiding the Resistance in an act of sabotage. The painting itself is at one point lost during its concealment, and when it is found a copy is forged. It is also sought not only by von Strohm but also Herr Flick who, rather than return it to Berlin, intends to keep it for himself.

The second storyline concerns the involvement of two stranded British airmen, shot down while over Nouvion. Because of their predicament, several plots in a number of episodes focus on the efforts of Michelle to devise plans that can help to send them back to England, with René not only forced to help hide them within his café or keep them under disguise, but also to help in her schemes, sometimes devised by London who relay these plans via a radio installed within the bedroom of Edith's mother. The schemes devised are so bizarre and complicated that they backfire, and usually collide with other schemes concocted by both von Strohm and the Gestapo, invariably leaving all three groups worse off than before. Other storylines include the efforts to remove von Klinkerhoffen's replacement from power, sabotaging the Germans' plan to invade England, and the subsequent build-up of German concern about an Allied invasion of France following the defeat of Italy.

=== Lloyd and Croft sitcom elements ===
As with previous sitcoms created before 'Allo 'Allo!, such as Lloyd and Croft's earlier collaboration Are You Being Served?, much of the humour is derived from classic elements of comedy including classic farce set-ups, comedy of errors, physical comedy and visual gags, alongside a large amount of sexual innuendo, and a fast-paced running string of broad cultural clichés. Like most characters devised for previous sitcoms, the cast for the programme were designed with notable elements to distinguish them throughout the series, be it a catchphrase, gimmick, or saying.

Like previous sitcoms devised by the creators, 'Allo 'Allo! ends each episode with the caption "You have been watching (in order of appearance)", followed by a short vignette shot of actors who performed in the episode — whether as a main or supporting character — identified by their name in caption within each sequence. Although the shots appear like a clip from the episode, the production team conduct a separate filming session aimed as a reenactment of a scene the actor was involved in, mostly pertaining to a specific camera angle or action conducted by their character, with the vignette sequence often done in order of their first spoken line; because of Rene's introductory monologues, actor Gorden Kaye is always first in the sequence, except for one episode of series 1 when Edith's background singing caused Carmen Silvera to be credited first.

=== "René Recaps" device ===
As each episode builds on previous ones, viewers are often required to have followed the series to the episode they have reached in order to understand the plot. As 'Allo 'Allo! revolved around individual story arcs spread across several episodes, the creators opted for using a comical version of the "As you remember ..." device, commonly used in serials, to act as a recap of events in the current story for the beginning of a new episode. This device within the sitcom was always conducted by René, who would open an episode by breaking the fourth wall (which Michael Bates did in It Ain't Half Hot Mum) to interact with the audience and provide a brief summary of events that had occurred previously, including notable events that had taken place, and also intermittently during episodes to make comic comments. This plot device was rare for comedy (including comedy animation), where plots are prominently gag-driven and self-contained, but its use in 'Allo 'Allo! had a major impact on audiences connecting with the characters. It also had considerable benefits for re-runs, as it allowed local TV stations who had reshuffled episodes for their schedule to ensure that their audiences could be aware of the plot events surrounding the story of the episode being broadcast.

=== "Foreign" languages ===
The main characters of the series were of four nationalities – French, German, English and Italian. Lloyd and Croft portrayed this by having non-English characters speak English with the accent of the foreign language, while the English characters spoke in upper-class English accents. French, German and Italian characters could understand each other when speaking, but the English characters could not understand the others without someone "translating" for them and vice versa.

The police officer Crabtree was introduced in the second series. Because the character was an undercover Englishman with a poor grasp of French, the actor, Arthur Bostrom, spoke perfectly when the character spoke in English, but extensively deployed malapropisms to represent when the character was speaking in French. Bostrom altered certain words in his sentences, substituting different vowels or consonants, changing them into different or nonsensical words, usually laden with innuendo. An example is the line "I was passing by the door, and I thought I would drop in," which Bostrom pronounced "I was pissing by the door, and I thought I would drip in." Another example is Crabtree's greeting of "good morning," pronounced "good moaning", which would become the character’s catchphrase.

=== The Fallen Madonna ===
The Fallen Madonna, usually referred to as The Fallen Madonna with the Big Boobies, by the fictional painter van Klomp is a portrait of a bare-breasted woman, which provided a running gag in the show. The first episode of the first series of 'Allo 'Allo! (1984), following the pilot, was titled The Fallen Madonna. In an earlier pilot, the painting was referred to as The Reclining Madonna.

There were sustained attempts by the occupiers to appropriate the Fallen Madonna, a local treasure, to provide a nest egg after the war. The painting was seen and hidden in various guises; it was often secreted, with suggestive possibilities, in a long knackwurst sausage. An incredible number of forgeries of the Fallen Madonna were made, mostly by Lieutenant Gruber and Monsieur Leclerc, which were hidden in knackwurst sausages in René's kitchen. The forgeries were subsequently destroyed in various ways (burned, blown up, minced, eaten by a dog, etc.). In the end of the 'Allo 'Allo! series the Fallen Madonna is found long after the war by an elderly René; he and his mistress Yvette quickly elope to Spain with the painting to live happily ever after.

Having previously sold for £4,000 in 2007, the original prop portrait from the series (The Fallen Madonna with the Big Boobies) sold for £15,000 at East Bristol Auctions in December 2018. The picture was purchased by a buyer in Nouvion. The BBC presented the 6th Marquess of Bath with a specially commissioned copy of the prop that was hung alongside Old Masters in Lord Bath's ancestral home, Longleat.

== Cast ==
1988 cast photo

=== Characters ===
Character	Nationality	Actor	Series 1 (1982–1984)	Series 2 (1985)	Series 3 (1986–1987)	Series 4 (1987)	Series 5 (1988–1989)	Series 6 (1989)	Series 7 (1991)	Series 8 (1991–1992)	Series 9 (1992)	Best of (1994)	Return (2007)
René Artois	French	Gorden Kaye	Main	Main	Main	Main	Main	Main	Main	Main	Main	Main	Main
Edith Melba Artois	French	Carmen Silvera	Main	Main	Main	Main	Main	Main	Main	Main	Main	Main	
Yvette Carte-Blanche	French	Vicki Michelle	Main	Main	Main	Main	Main	Main	Main	Main	Main		Main
Maria Recamier	French	Francesca Gonshaw	Main	Main	Main								
Mimi Labonq	French	Sue Hodge				Main	Main	Main	Main	Main	Main		Main
Michelle "of the Résistance" Dubois	French	Kirsten Cooke	Main	Main	Main	Main	Main	Main	Main	Main	Main		Main
Monsieur Roger Leclerc	French	Jack Haig	Main	Main	Main	Main	Main						
Monsieur Ernest Leclerc	French	Derek Royle						Main					
Monsieur Ernest Leclerc	French	Robin Parkinson							Main	Main	Main		Main
Monsieur Alfonse	French	Kenneth Connor	Main	Main	Main	Main	Main	Main	Main	Main	Main		
Madame Fanny La Fan	French	Rose Hill	Main	Main	Main	Main	Main	Main	Main	Main	Main		
Major-General Erich von Klinkerhoffen	German	Hilary Minster	Main	Main	Main	Main	Main	Main	Main	Main	Main		
Colonel Kurt von Strohm	German	Richard Marner	Main	Main	Main	Main	Main	Main	Main	Main	Main		
Lieutenant Hubert Gruber	German	Guy Siner	Main	Main	Main	Main	Main	Main	Main	Main	Main		Main
Captain Hans Geering	German	Sam Kelly	Main	Main	Main	Recurring			Guest				
Herr Otto Flick	German	Richard Gibson	Main	Main	Main	Main	Main	Main	Main	Main			
Herr Otto Flick	German	David Janson									Main		
Herr Engelbert von Smallhausen	German	John Louis Mansi		Recurring	Main	Main	Main	Main	Main	Main	Main		
Private Helga Geerhart	German	Kim Hartman	Main	Main	Main	Main	Main	Main	Main	Main	Main		
Captain Alberto Bertorelli	Italian	Gavin Richards				Main	Main	Main					
Captain Alberto Bertorelli	Italian	Roger Kitter							Main				
Officer (Captain) Crabtree	British	Arthur Bostrom		Main	Main	Main	Main	Main	Main	Main	Main		Main
RAF Flight Lieutenant Gavin Fairfax	British	John D. Collins	Main	Main	Main	Main	Main	Main	Main		Guest		Main
RAF Flight Lieutenant Bumbly Carstairs	British	Nicholas Frankau	Main	Main	Main	Main	Main	Main	Main		Guest		Main

== Episodes ==
Release timeline
1982	Pilot
1983
1984	Series 1
1985	Series 2
1986	Series 3
1987	Series 4
1988	Series 5
1989	Series 6
1990
1991	Series 7
1992	Series 8 and 9
1993
1994	The Best of 'Allo 'Allo!
1995–2006
2007	The Return of 'Allo 'Allo!

After the pilot aired in December 1982, a full-length first series of seven episodes was commissioned and aired from September 1984 onwards. Series two, three and four followed annually, with six episodes each.

Series five was commissioned with a view to syndicating the show in America. As a result, it aired as a single long series of twenty-six episodes between September 1988 and February 1989, with each episode running only twenty-five minutes to allow for commercials. The attempts to air the show in America failed (although screening rights to the series were later sold to PBS), and so series six had only eight episodes commissioned, which aired from September 1989 onwards.

On 25 January 1990, Gorden Kaye suffered serious head injuries in a car crash brought on by gale-force winds. This delayed the start of the seventh series, which consisted of ten episodes airing from January 1991 onwards. Series 8 (7 episodes) followed in January 1992, and the ninth and final series of six episodes aired later that year from November onwards.

Two Christmas specials were also made. The first was a 45-minute episode, which followed Series 2 in 1985, and the second was also a 45-minute episode, screened at Christmas 1991, preceding Series 8.

In 1994, two years after the series ended, the BBC broadcast The Best of 'Allo 'Allo!, a compilation of clips from the series, linked by new scenes featuring Gorden Kaye and Carmen Silvera, in which René and Edith reminisce about the events of the war.

On 22 March 2007, a one-off special episode entitled The Return of 'Allo 'Allo! was filmed in Manchester, and was broadcast on 28 April 2007 at 9 pm on BBC 2. The storyline involves René writing his memoirs after the war, and the events from the final episode in 1992 have been overlooked. The new scenes were interspersed with clips from the original series and new interviews. The actors who reprised their roles were: Gorden Kaye, Vicki Michelle, Sue Hodge, Kirsten Cooke, Arthur Bostrom, Guy Siner, Robin Parkinson, John D. Collins and Nicholas Frankau. In addition, Richard Gibson and Sam Kelly are interviewed, although they are not reprising their respective roles. The only main characters who did not appear in the reunion at all (barring those cases where the actor or actress had died) were Private Helga Geerhart (played by Kim Hartman) and Herr Engelbert von Smallhausen (played by John Louis Mansi). Jeremy Lloyd wrote the new material.

Series	Episodes	Originally released	
Series	Episodes	First released	Last released
Pilot	1	30 December 1982	
1	7	7 September 1984	19 October 1984
2	6	21 October 1985	25 November 1985
3	6	5 December 1986	9 January 1987
4	6	7 November 1987	12 December 1987
5	26	3 September 1988	25 February 1989
6	8	2 September 1989	21 October 1989
7	10	5 January 1991	16 March 1991
8	7	12 January 1992	1 March 1992
9	6	9 November 1992	14 December 1992

=== 'Allo 'Allo! Forty Years of Laughter ===
In 2022, Channel 5 aired a 67-minute special retrospective for their "Comedy Classics" series. Cast, crew and celebrities discuss and pay tribute to the show. The documentary features interviews with Guy Siner, Vicki Michelle, Kim Hartman and Sue Hodge, as well as a previously unseen archive interview with Gorden Kaye. The show is narrated by Stephen Mangan.

== German version ==
On 10 March 2008, ProSieben Sat.1 Media bought the rights to broadcast the series for the first time in Germany, which was broadcast on Sat.1 Comedy beginning on 15 February 2010. In the meantime, the series was also broadcast on German free TV on Comedy Central Germany.

== Cultural references ==
The series was produced as a parody of the BBC wartime drama Secret Army (1977 to 1979), drawing on its setting of a Resistance network operating from a café in German-occupied Belgium, as well as character types including Resistance members, German officers and café waitresses. The painting storyline in 'Allo 'Allo! also draws on the Secret Army second-series episode "Weekend", where the Germans and the Resistance seek to obtain valuable paintings, with forgeries playing a part in the plot. Several actors from Secret Army also appeared in 'Allo 'Allo!, including Richard Marner, Guy Siner, John D. Collins, Hilary Minster, David Beckett and Louis Sheldon.

René's café and his reluctance to choose between the Germans and the Resistance have also been compared to Rick's nightclub and political neutrality in Casablanca (1942). In a review of the 1972 BBC series Clochemerle, Marc Saul of Television Heaven described it as closer in style to The Darling Buds of May than to 'Allo 'Allo! Inspiration was also drawn from patriotic black-and-white British melodramas of the 1940s.

== Music ==
Having a café-cabaret in the plot, music was often performed on the show. This usually took place with Madame Edith singing, and either Lt. Gruber or Leclerc at the piano, played (out of vision) by Roy Moore. Occasionally, characters could also be seen whistling or humming tunes at certain points.

=== Theme tune ===
David Croft and Roy Moore composed the theme tune performed at the start and end of each episode. It features a French-style melody performed on an accordion, accompanied by a string quartet and other instruments, in the 3/4 (waltz) time signature. The title is "'Allo 'Allo", and the first lyrics are:

'Allo 'Allo, we meet again,
And just as before ...

Carmen Silvera sang the full song and it was released on LP in the 1980s.

=== Other music ===
The café cabaret music usually took the form of 1930s film and show tunes – reminiscent of the way period songs were also used in Secret Army.

Most popular was "Louise" from the film Innocents of Paris (1929), which featured a number of times and was even sung in the "broken-French" language of Crabtree, who pronounced the title "Loo-woes". Gruber sang a number such as "Can't Help Lovin' Dat Man" from Show Boat or "(I Got a Woman Crazy for Me) She's Funny That Way" by Neil Monet and Richard A. Whiting. He gazed at René in a slightly lustful manner, replacing lyrics such as "woman" and "she" with "boy" and "he". He caused a particular sensation with his straight version of Noël Coward's "Mad About the Boy".

Naturally the "La Marseillaise" and the German national anthem "Deutschlandlied" featured from time to time, for example where several French peasants sang La Marsellaise to celebrate the expected bombing of the Germans, but the singers flawlessly and without hesitation switch to Das Lied der Deutschen when the Germans come past. Helga also sometimes stripped to a rather raunchy version (arranged by Roy Moore) of the latter tune.

Captain Bertorelli could be seen singing "'O Sole Mio (It's Now or Never)"; and the British airmen in a prisoner of war camp could be seen singing "Hitler Has Only Got One Ball".

In 1986, Gorden Kaye and Vicki Michelle released a version of the hit song "Je t'aime... moi non plus". The characters of Yvette and René could be heard talking and canoodling in a comic manner whilst the familiar musical "Je t'aime..."' melody played in the background. The song got to number fifty-seven in the UK Singles Chart.

In 1985, Gorden Kaye and Carmen Silvera appeared in the Royal Variety Performance in character as René and Edith, and sang "I Remember It Well" from Gigi.

== Stage show ==
The show gave rise to a successful touring stage-show featuring most of the TV cast. This ran from 1986 to 1992, and included three London stage runs as well as international tours.

In January 1990, Gorden Kaye suffered serious head injuries in a car accident. As a result, his understudy, John Larson, played the part in a London Palladium production. Kaye had a dent in his forehead for the rest of his life from a piece of wood that smashed through the car window. He wanted to end the television show after his accident, but was persuaded by Jeremy Lloyd to continue. In Australia Gorden Kaye's part was played by Australian comedian/impressionist Max Gillies (later, Gorden Kaye repaid the favour when he took over Max Gillies' role in another play in Australia, when Max Gillies was unable to take part).

The show was last performed for a summer season at Bournemouth's Pier Theatre in 1996.

In 2007 Gorden Kaye, Sue Hodge and Guy Siner reprised their roles in a production of the stage show in Brisbane, Australia. They were joined by Steven Tandy as Colonel von Strohm and Jason Gann as Herr Flick.

A new touring show, based on the 1992 tour written by David Croft and Jeremy Lloyd, opened at the Gordon Craig Theatre in Stevenage, Hertfordshire on 29 August 2008 before going on a national tour the following year. Vicki Michelle reprised her role as Yvette Carte-Blanche. The cast also included Jeffrey Holland playing Rene Artois and his wife Judy Buxton playing Michelle Dubois. Other cast members included Robin Sebastian as Gruber, James Rossman as Herr Flick, Nell Jerram as Private Helga Geerhart and Claire Andreadis as Mimi Labonq.

The theatrical version is also frequently performed by amateur theatre companies in the UK and elsewhere.

A sequel stage show, 'Allo 'Allo 2 – The Camembert Caper, written by David Lovesy, David Pibworth and Steve Clark, adapted from the TV series and approved by the Croft and Lloyd estates was published by Concord Theatricals in September 2023. This is also available for theatre groups to perform worldwide.

== Locations ==
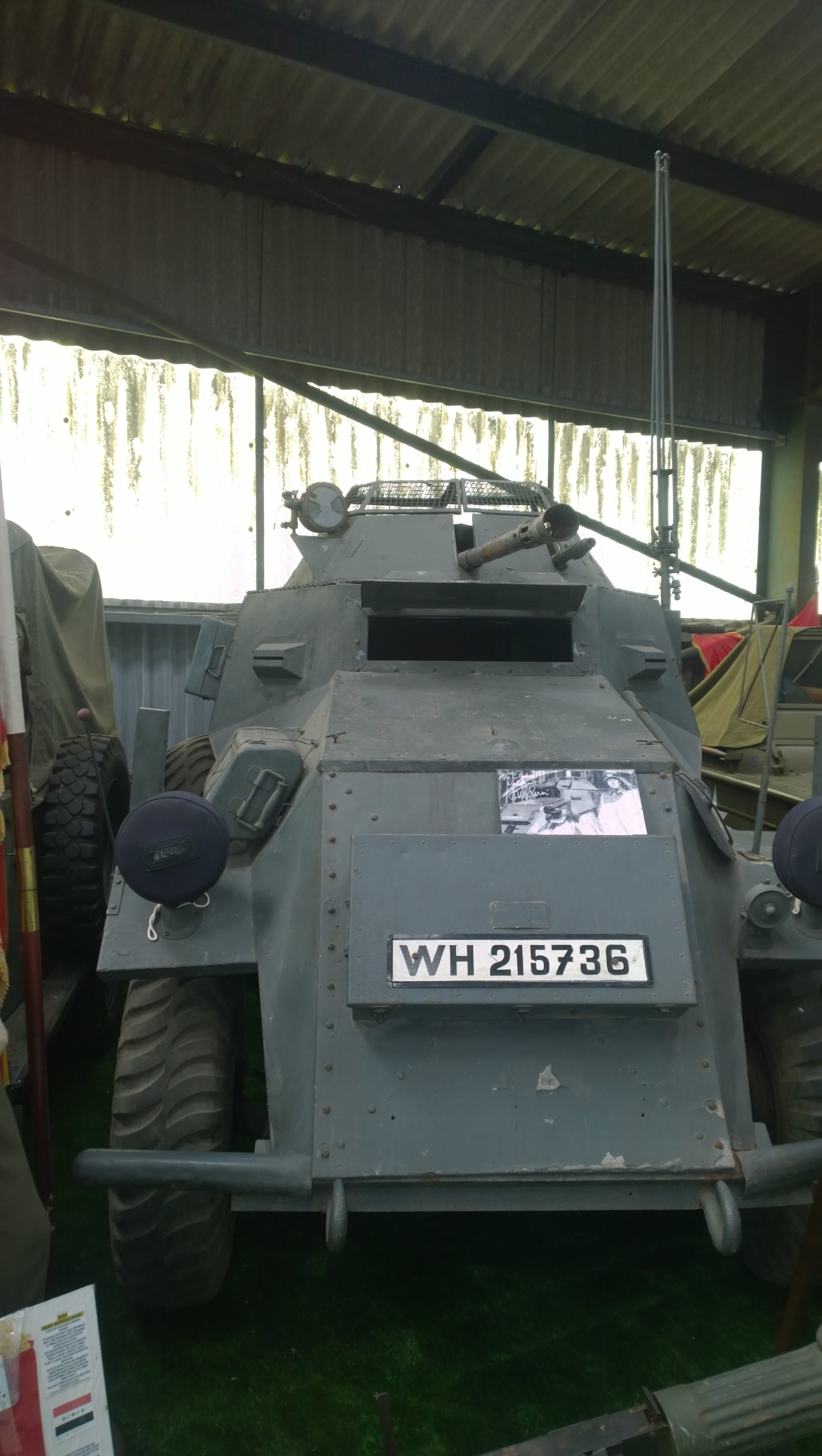
Replica SdKfz 222 armoured car used in the making of 'Allo 'Allo! at the History on Wheels Museum, Eton Wick, Windsor

Exterior shooting took place in Norfolk, much of it at Lynford Hall.

Between 1982 and 1987, and from 1989 to 1992, all interior scenes were filmed in front of a studio audience at the BBC Television Centre studios in London. For the fifth series, recorded from December 1987 to August 1988, production moved to BBC Elstree Centre in Studio D. With hopes for a US syndication deal, the BBC planned to make 26 new episodes of the sitcom; hence, a bigger space was needed for the production. Even though the US syndication deal did not go ahead as planned, production remained at BBC Elstree Centre for the remainder of the fifth series. With more space available, the outside set of Café Rene became a semi-permanent structure in the former ATV Garage building.

The exact location supposed to be depicted in the show was kept vague. The town of Nouvion does exist, and it is near Abbeville, which was referenced in the show on several occasions. However, it is only a few miles from the English Channel (the show's Nouvion was supposed to be "fifty miles from the coast"), and it is quite distant from the area targeted by the allied Operation Overlord which was supposed to have been seen in the last episode (in reality, it was not liberated by the Allies until September 1944). Road signs used as props in outdoor scenes of the show include signs for Caen, Orbec, Falaise, Livarot, and Pont l'Eveque — all consistent with a location in the department of Calvados, some 200 km to the west of the real Nouvion.

== Home media ==
=== Australian and New Zealand DVD releases ===
In Australia, Roadshow Entertainment, under licence from the BBC, began releasing the series on DVD in 2006, on a semi-annual basis. To date, all series have been released on DVD; only the Return of 'Allo 'Allo! TV special remains to be released.

DVD name	Release date	Comments
'Allo 'Allo! – Series 1 & 2	7 June 2006	3-disc set
'Allo 'Allo! – Series 3 & 4	7 September 2006	3-disc set, includes Christmas special 1
'Allo 'Allo! – Series 5	9 February 2007	4-disc set
'Allo 'Allo! – Series 6	7 November 2007	2-disc set
'Allo 'Allo! – Series 7	2 April 2008	2-disc set
'Allo 'Allo! – Series 8	6 August 2008	2-disc set, includes Christmas special 2
'Allo 'Allo! – Series 9	5 March 2009	2-disc set, includes The Best of 'Allo 'Allo!
'Allo 'Allo! – The Complete Collection	6 August 2009	18-disc boxed set
'Allo 'Allo! – Series 1–4	5 August 2010	6-disc set
'Allo 'Allo! – The Complete Collection (re-release)	6 May 2020	Contains all 85 episodes (including the two Christmas specials) although the cover states that it contains only 84.

=== UK DVD releases ===
Universal Playback, under licence from the BBC, began releasing the series on DVD in 2002. In the UK six boxed sets with series 1–9 have been released, as well as a complete boxed set.

The original UK releases have episode titles superimposed over the openings of the episodes (series 1–4). The 2013 re-release of the complete series boxed set omits the majority, but not all of these superimposed titles. The American releases have no on-screen episode titles, reflecting the way that the shows were originally transmitted.

DVD name	Release date	Comments
'Allo 'Allo! – Series 1 & 2	8 August 2002	
'Allo 'Allo! – Series 3 & 4	16 February 2004	
'Allo 'Allo! – Series 5 Volume 1	23 October 2006	
'Allo 'Allo! – Series 5 Volume 2	26 December 2006	
'Allo 'Allo! – Series 6 & 7	18 August 2008	
'Allo 'Allo! – Series 8 & 9	26 December 2008	
'Allo 'Allo! – The Complete Collection	2 November 2009	
'Allo 'Allo! – The Complete Collection (re-release)	23 September 2013	Contains all 85 episodes (including the two Christmas specials) although the cover states that it contains only 84.
'Allo 'Allo! – The Complete Collection (re-release)	2 November 2015	Contains all 85 episodes (including the two Christmas specials) although the cover states that it contains only 84.
'Allo 'Allo! – The Christmas Specials	3 November 2014	

=== North American DVD releases ===
In January 2004, BBC Worldwide began releasing the show itself on DVD in North America, distributed by Warner Bros., beginning with Series 1. The releases continued on a somewhat irregular basis (approximately twice-yearly).

DVD Name	Release dates
'Allo 'Allo!: The Complete Series One	2004-01-20 (2 discs)
'Allo 'Allo!: The Complete Series Two	2005-03-15 (2 discs; includes Christmas special 1)
'Allo 'Allo!: The Complete Series Three	2005-08-16 (2 discs)
'Allo 'Allo!: The Complete Series Four	2006-01-24
'Allo 'Allo!: The Complete Series Five Part Un	2006-07-25 (2 discs)
'Allo 'Allo!: The Complete Series Five Part Deux	2006-07-25 (2 discs)
'Allo 'Allo!: The Complete Series Six	2007-01-16 (2 discs)
'Allo 'Allo!: The Complete Series Seven	2008-01-15 (2 discs)
'Allo 'Allo!: The Complete Series Eight	2008-05-06 (2 discs; includes Christmas special 2)
'Allo 'Allo!: The Complete Series Nine	2008-10-07 (2 discs; includes the Best of)
'Allo 'Allo!: The Best of (1994)	2008-10-07
'Allo 'Allo!: The Return of (2007)	TBA

- Note: The Best of 'Allo 'Allo! is included as an extra on the series nine DVDs.

=== Video game ===
A video game adaptation named 'Allo 'Allo! Cartoon Fun was released for the Amiga in 1993 by Alternative Software. It is a platform game where players control René.

== See also ==
- British sitcom
- Are You Being Served?
- Keeping Up Appearances
- Hogan's Heroes
