= Amanda Royle =

British actress

Amanda Royle is a former British actress who appeared in British television dramas, including Miss Marple, At Bertram's Hotel, Agatha Christie's Poirot, Campion, Rosemary & Thyme and Bulman.

Royle's work on stage included portraying Franceschina in The Dutch Courtesan at the Orange Tree Theatre in 1992.

She is the sister of the actress Carol Royle. Their father, Derek Royle, was also an actor.

After completing an MA in integrative counselling and psychotherapy, Royle now works in Esher, Surrey, as a psychotherapist.
