= Roger Kitter =

British actor and comedian (1949–2015)

- Born: Roger Daniel Kitter; 20 October 1949; Southsea, Hampshire, England
- Died: 3 January 2015 (aged 65); London, England
- Other name: "The Brat" (recorded as)
- Occupations: Actor; comedian; impressionist
- Years active: 1972–2015
- Spouse: Karan David (m. 1975)
- Children: 1

Roger Daniel Kitter (20 October 1949 – 3 January 2015) was an English actor, comedian and impressionist, best known for playing Captain Alberto Bertorelli in series 7 of the British sitcom TV series 'Allo 'Allo! (1991) after the actor Gavin Richards left the role.

Kitter had previously appeared weekly with Lulu throughout the 10-week run of her 1973 BBC1 series It's Lulu and was a regular on the ITV show Who Do You Do?. With Kaplan Kaye he also recorded a song "Chalk Dust – The Umpire Strikes Back" using the monicker "the Brat". Released by Hansa Records, it entered the UK singles chart on 10 July 1982; it reached a peak of No. 19, and remained in the chart for 8 weeks.

A Freemason, he was a member of the Chelsea Lodge No. 3098, made up of entertainers. On 25 September 2009 he became Chairman of the Entertainment Artistes' Benevolent Fund.

Kitter died from cancer on 3 January 2015, aged 65.
