= Derek Royle =

British actor (1928–1990)

- Born: 2 September 1928; Reddish, Stockport, England
- Died: 23 January 1990 (aged 61); London, England
- Years active: 1959–1989
- Spouse: Jane Shortt (m. 1953)
- Children: Amanda Royle; Carol Royle

Derek Stanley Royle (2 September 1928 – 23 January 1990) was a British actor. He acted in films and TV from the early 1960s until his death. He had a supporting role in the Beatles' film Magical Mystery Tour in 1967, as well as a minor one with Cilla Black in the film Work Is a Four-Letter Word a year later.

Most of his film appearances were in comedy films such as Tiffany Jones (1973), Don't Just Lie There, Say Something! (1974) and Confessions of a Sex Maniac (1974).

== Stage and television roles ==
He appeared in a children's TV comedy series, Hogg's Back (1975) as Doctor Hogg, an eccentric general practitioner (GP); in 2016, this series appeared on Talking Pictures TV. Royle acted with Wendy Richard and Pat Coombs over two series. Hog's Back is a ridge of hills in Surrey. Royle played the hotel guest who dies in his room in the Fawlty Towers episode "The Kipper and the Corpse". He also was the first actor to portray Monsieur Ernest Leclerc in the sixth series of 'Allo 'Allo! (replacing Jack Haig, who had portrayed Ernest's brother Roger), and had a supporting role in a remake of Indiscreet (1988) and a new BBC version of a Lord Peter Wimsey story. As a stage actor he was a mainstay of Brian Rix's Whitehall farces company. He specialised in absent minded characters and used his acrobatic skills to fall down stairs and immediately get up again as if nothing had happened. Theatre critic Michael Coveney called him "simply one of the funniest men on the English stage".

== Personal life and death ==
Derek Stanley Royle was born in Reddish on 7 September 1928, and graduated from RADA in 1950. He was married to make-up artist Jane Royle (née Shortt) and their daughters Amanda and Carol Royle became actresses.

Royle died from cancer at the Royal Marsden Hospital in London on 23 January 1990, aged 61.
