= Mike Stephens (director) =

British television producer and director

- Occupations: Television producer, director
- Years active: 1979–2001

Mike Stephens is a British television producer and director, most famous for producing and directing the television series 'Allo 'Allo! and The Brittas Empire. From 1988-1989, he produced and directed two series of First of the Summer Wine, a television prequel series to Last of the Summer Wine.
