= Robin Parkinson =

English actor (1929–2022)

- Born: Christopher Robin Parkinson; 25 October 1929; Coventry, Warwickshire, England
- Died: 7 May 2022 (aged 92); Kingston-Upon-Thames, London, England
- Years active: 1957–2007
- Spouse: Patricia Rogers (m. 1956)
- Children: 3; including Sarah

Christopher Robin Parkinson (25 October 1929 – 7 May 2022) was an English actor known for his comedy roles. He was the second actor to portray Monsieur Ernest Leclerc in 'Allo 'Allo! (22 episodes: series 7 to 9), after the death of Derek Royle. He was also the narrator of Button Moon.

== Career ==
Parkinson began his career in December 1957, appearing in The Imperial Nightingale at the Birmingham Repertory Theatre, then joined the company at the Belgrade Theatre in his native Coventry. He made his first film appearance as the jeweller's assistant in Billy Liar (1963), followed by such titles as The Family Way (1966), They Came from Beyond Space (1967), Twisted Nerve (1968), Catch Me a Spy (1971), Alfie Darling (1975) and George and Mildred (1980). His TV appearances included roles in Dad's Army, It Ain't Half Hot Mum, Terry and June, The Young Ones, The Kenny Everett Television Show, Thriller, Shelley, The Dick Emery Show, On the Buses, Whatever Happened to the Likely Lads?, The Gaffer (TV series), (as the Vicar, in 'The Candidate' episode), and The Liver Birds. He also played Desmond, the love interest of Miss Jones, in Rising Damp and a taxi driver in The Professionals (series 2, episode 8: A Stirring of Dust). In addition, he narrated and provided voices for the ITV television series Button Moon.

== Personal life and death ==
Parkinson was born on 25 October 1929 in Coventry, Warwickshire. He attended King Henry VIII School, Coventry and, after National Service with the Queen's Royal Lancers, the Birmingham School of Speech Training and Dramatic Art. He married Patricia Rogers in 1956 and had three daughters, one of whom, Sarah Parkinson (1962–2003), was a writer-producer of radio and television programmes and was married to comedian Paul Merton.

Parkinson died on 7 May 2022, aged 92.
