= Francesca Gonshaw =

British actress

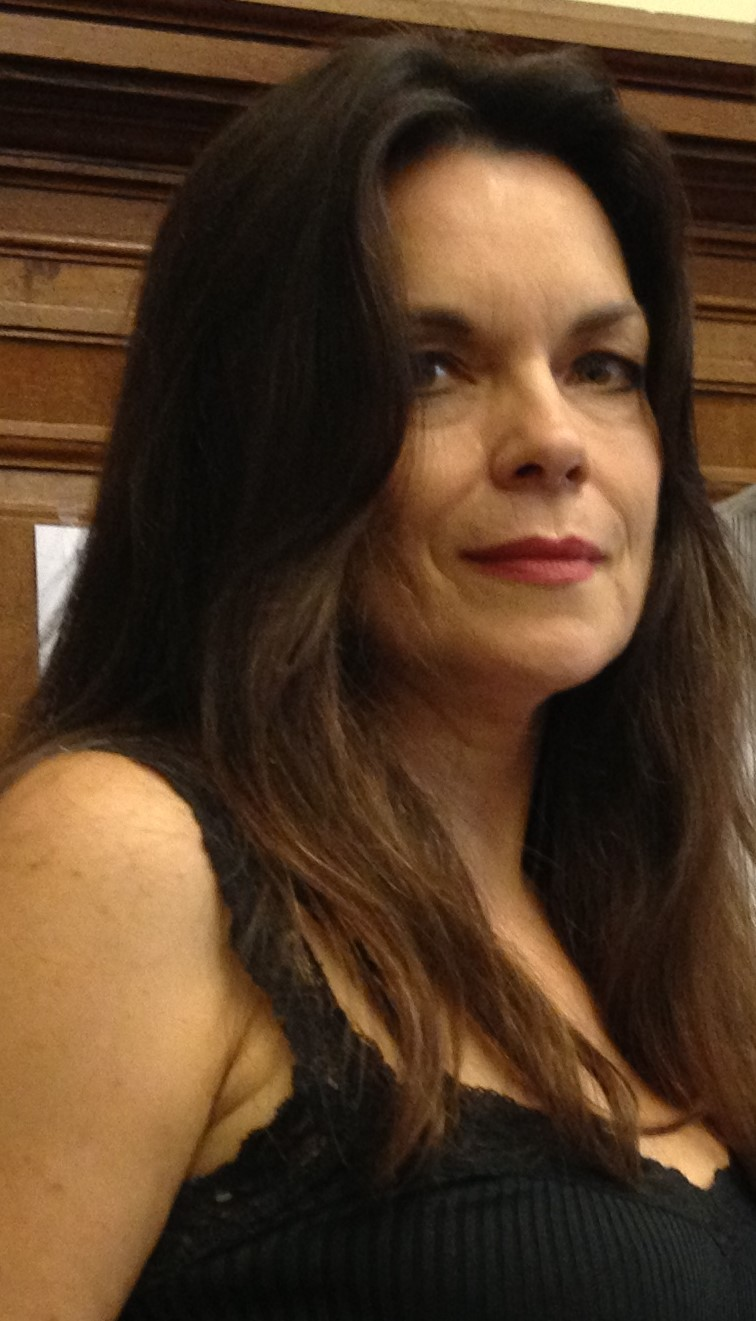
- Francesca Gonshaw in 2014
- Born: 25 November 1959 (age 66)
- Occupations: Actress; Publishing executive Curator
- Years active: 1982–1990
- Notable work: 'Allo 'Allo! Crossroads; Howards' Way

Francesca Gonshaw (born 25 November 1959) is an English former actress who appeared in television, theatre and cinema productions in the 1980s. From 1982 to 1987, she appeared as Maria Recamier in the BBC's 'Allo 'Allo! television situation comedy series set in occupied France during World War II.

After early roles in the BBC's Shades and Gesualdo the Prince, Gonshaw featured as Arsinoe in The Cleopatras in 1983. After leaving 'Allo 'Allo! for the role of Amanda Parker in the drama Howard's Way, Gonshaw appeared in other productions including as Lisa Walters in the Central soap-opera Crossroads (1984–85), as Maria in the movie Biggles: Adventures in Time (1986) and in the Grammy-winning music video for Peter Gabriel's "Digging in the Dirt" (1992). On stage, she played Hermia in A Midsummer Night's Dream and Ophelia in Hamlet. After her acting career, she went on to work for Miramax Books, and then became curator of an art gallery.

== Early life ==
Francesca Gonshaw's father came to England as a child with his parents as Russian White emigres fleeing from the Bolshevik Revolution. She attended St Paul's Girls' School. The family relocated from London to Marbella, Spain in 1976. At the age of 17, she returned to England to study for her A Levels in Cambridge, and then Modern Languages at the University of London. She also studied acting, but did not complete the course, and was a model in a photo story for My Guy magazine.

== Television and film ==
In 1982, Gonshaw appeared in a BBC television play entitled Shades. The following year, she was in Gesualdo the Prince, based on the true story of Carlo Gesualdo who murdered his wife and her lover after discovering them in bed together.

She played Arsinoe in the 1983 BBC television classical Roman history drama series The Cleopatras. That same year, she played a rape victim in a film adaptation of The Hound of the Baskervilles. From 1984 to 1985, she was the character Lisa Walters in the Central soap opera Crossroads. In February 1984, Hilary Kingsley of the Daily Mirror criticised Gonshaw's performance in Crossroads, saying that she "[spoke] her lines as though reading them from an optician's chart."

From 1982 to 1987, she featured as waitress Maria Recamier in the BBC's 'Allo 'Allo! television situation comedy series set in occupied France during World War II. The producers had wanted to cast Mary Stävin, but the Department of Employment refused permission, saying that they believed a British actress could be found for the role. Gonshaw was a subscriber to Production Casting Report, which published details of planned television projects, and had sent a letter and photograph seeking a role in the series, and was invited to attend an audition for the pilot, for which she travelled to London from Spain. Gonshaw had met and become an acquaintance of series co-creator Jeremy Lloyd in Marbella, and has said that she was surprised to meet him again at the audition. She was given the part. The show satirised dramas such as Secret Army, and like other UK situation comedies of the time, contained double entendres, catchphrases, and running gags. It ran for 85 episodes from 1982 to 1992, attracting as many as 17 million viewers per episode in the UK, and was sold to overseas markets including France and Germany. Gonshaw was in 21 of the episodes, in the first three series. She complained in a 1986 interview that "I wanted to be a serious actress. Now I seem to be known only as a bawdy waitress wearing stockings and suspenders." Gonshaw declined the opportunity to appear in the popular stage version of 'Allo 'Allo!, and after three months out of work, embarked on a piano bar tour on the Costa del Sol, intending to perform three songs that she had written as part of the performances. She left the cast of 'Allo 'Allo after its third series to take up the role of Amanda Parker in the third series of the BBC television drama series Howards' Way in 1987. She also started attending the Byam Shaw School of Art, studying painting.

Gonshaw portrayed Maria, the girlfriend of Biggles in the historical/science fiction cinema film Biggles: Adventures in Time (1986), and played the character of Senorita Rodriguez in the television film dramatization of the Barbara Cartland novel A Ghost in Monte Carlo (1990). She made guest appearances on Blankety Blank, and in The Russ Abbot Show.

In 1992, she appeared in the pop music video for the Peter Gabriel single release "Digging in the Dirt", which won a Grammy for "Best Music Video – short form."

== Theatre ==
In 1982, Gonshaw played Kate in You Should See Us Now, by Peter Tinniswood, at the Greenwich Theatre; the cast also included Simon Cadell, Christopher Cazenove and Pauline Yates. In the mid-1980s, she joined the New Shakespeare Company's tour of thirteen countries in the Middle East, portraying Hermia in A Midsummer Night's Dream, then in 1988 she starred in a regional tour of The Cat and the Canary. Two years later, Gonshaw played Ophelia in Hamlet at three venues – the Brixton Assembly Rooms, the Pentameters Theatre in Hampstead, and the Shaw Theatre. The proceeds of this production went towards AIDS charities. Her performances in both The Cat and the Canary and Hamlet received negative reviews in The Stage.

== Post-acting career ==
After studying art for a year, Gonshaw joined Miramax Books & Films and took up the post of Senior Vice-President of Acquisitions. She was the editorial director for a book of Robert Altman's Prêt-à-Porter, and compiled Love: ten poems of Pablo Neruda. In 2001 she was a casting agent for the film The Goose Creek Story. According to Gonshaw's own LinkedIn profile, she has been an artist since 2009. She was also the curator of the 'She has a Space' gallery in London. She exhibited at the 7–8 October 2009 Art for Youth event at the Mall Galleries. Since 2011 she has occasionally appeared at memorabilia collectors conventions with the former cast of Allo Allo. In 2022, Gonshaw stood for election as the Liberal Democrat candidate for the Vincent Square ward in the City of Westminster.

Vincent Square (3 seats)
Party	Candidate	Votes	%	±%
Conservative	David John Harvey*	1,377	46.3	
Labour	Gillian Sharon Arrindell	1,324	44.5	
Conservative	Selina Ann Short*	1,305	43.8	
Conservative	Martin Patrick Hayes	1,297	43.6	
Labour	David Anthony Parton	1,232	41.4	
Labour	Ananthi Paskaralingam	1,155	38.8	
Liberal Democrats	Francesca Rebecca Gonshaw	371	12.5	
Liberal Democrats	Phillip Lindsay Kerle	271	9.1	
Liberal Democrats	Richard Lindsay Wood	269	9.0	
Turnout		2,977	39.22	
Conservative hold		Swing		
Labour gain from Conservative		Swing		
Conservative hold		Swing		

== Credits ==
Television

Year	Title	Role	Notes	Ref.
1982	Shades	Julie/Sue		
1982	The British Are Coming	Maria	Pilot episode for 'Allo 'Allo!	
1982	Gesualdo the Prince	cast member		
1983	The Cleopatras Part 6 51 BC	Arsinoe	Mini-series	
1983	The Cleopatras Part 8 35 BC	Arsinoe	Mini-series	
1983	The Hound of the Baskervilles	Young girl in mire	television film (Note: BFI has date as 1988, some other sources say 1983)	
1984–85	Crossroads	Lisa Walters		
1984	Cold Warrior	Amanda	Episode: "Hook, Line and Sinker"	
1984–1987	'Allo 'Allo!	Maria Recamier	21 episodes	
1986	Farrington of the F.O.	Lolita Fernandez		
1987	Blankety Blank	Herself	guest	
1987	Howards' Way	Amanda Howard	Recurring	
1990	She-Wolf of London	Judith	Episode "Nice Girls Don't" (Note: credited as Franchesca Gonshaw)	

Film

Year	Title	Role	Notes	Ref.
1986	Biggles	Marie	Movie	
1990	A Ghost in Monte Carlo		television film	

Theatre

Dates	Title	Role	Venue	Ref.
1983	You Should See Us Now	Kate	Stephen Joseph Theatre, Scarborough; tour	
1983	Sailors' Dream		Prince of Wales, London SW6	
1985	Dear Janet Rosenberg, Dear Mr Kooning		King's Head, Islington	
1985	A Midsummer Night's Dream	Hermia	New Shakespeare Company's tour of 13 countries in the Middle East	
1988	The Cat and the Canary	Annabelle West	regional tour	
1990	Hamlet	Ophelia	Brixton Assembly Rooms; Pentameters, Hampstead; Shaw Theatre	
1991	The Judgment	Director (non-acting)	London Ecology Centre	

== Publications ==
Year	Title	Credits	Publisher	ISBN	Ref.
1994	Robert Altman's Prêt-à-Porter	Script by Robert Altman, Barbara Shulgasser, and Brian D. Leitch; introductions and interviews by Brian D. Leitch; art direction: Fabian Baron; design: Malin Ericson; editorial director: Francesca Gonshaw	Hyperion	ISBN 9780786881031	
1995	Love: ten poems of Pablo Neruda	translated by Stephen Tapscott and others; compiled by Francesca Gonshaw	Miramax Books	ISBN 9780786881482	
