= Sue Hodge =

British actress

- Born: 4 June 1957 (age 68); Orsett, Essex, England
- Spouse: Keith 'Paddington' Richards (since 2003)
- Website: suehodge.biz

Sue Hodge (born 4 June 1957) is an English actress, best known for her role as the waitress Mimi Labonq in the BBC sitcom 'Allo 'Allo!. Trained as a dancer and theatre performer at Bird College, she has performed in theatre and on television in the UK and internationally, and appeared as a Force of Darkness in Terry Gilliam's 1985 film Brazil.

She returned to the role of Mimi in The Return of 'Allo 'Allo! in 2007.

In June/July 2007, she appeared as Mimi in the stage show 'Allo 'Allo!, alongside Gorden Kaye as René Artois and Guy Siner as Lieutenant Hubert Gruber, at Twelfth Night Theatre, in Brisbane, Australia.

Hodge returned to British television screens in 2009, playing Connie in BBC3 sitcom The Lads Club.

In 2016 Hodge starred as Nurse Mimi in the Haverhill Arts Centre production of the pantomime Robin Hood.

Hodge tours in a one-woman show Mimi and Me ('Allo Again) and has written a book, Mimi's Memoirs.
