= John Louis Mansi =

British actor (1926–2010)

- Mansi playing von Smallhausen in 'Allo 'Allo!
- Born: John Patrick Adams; 8 November 1926; London, United Kingdom
- Died: 6 August 2010 (aged 83); Berwick, East Sussex, United Kingdom
- Resting place: Bexhill Cemetery
- Other name: Louis Mansi
- Occupation: Actor
- Years active: 1952–1992

John Louis Mansi (born John Patrick Adams; 8 November 1926 – 6 August 2010) was a British television and film actor whose career spanned the years from the early 1950s to the early 1990s.

Born in London to an Italian father and an Irish mother, he served in the merchant navy and the RAF during World War II. Upon becoming an actor, he chose his father's surname as his stage name, later adopting the name Louis after Louie Dumbrowski, the character played by Bernard Gorcey in The Bowery Boys film series, whom his friends claimed he resembled.

He was best known for his role as Engelbert von Smallhausen (although in the BBC books he is named as Bobby Cedric von Smallhausen) in the popular BBC sitcom 'Allo 'Allo! in series 2 to 9. He also appeared in Department S (as "Maxime" in the episode "The Treasure of the Costa del Sol", 1969), the Ripping Yarns story "Across the Andes by Frog", and the Hammer House of Horror story "The Thirteenth Reunion". His film appearances have included The Small World of Sammy Lee (1963), the Beatles' film Help! (1965), the original version of The Italian Job (1969), Tales from the Crypt (1972), and the Dick Emery film Ooh... You Are Awful (1972).

After 'Allo 'Allo! ended in 1992, he retired from acting. He was often credited as Louis Mansi in his roles. For six years he suffered from Parkinson's disease and in May 2010 was diagnosed with terminal lung cancer. His interests included reading, letter writing, animal welfare and watching DVDs/videos of past favourite series/films.

== Filmography ==
Year	Title	Role	Notes
1952	Secret People	Member of Paris Committee	
1952	Hammer the Toff	The Italian	Uncredited
1963	The Small World of Sammy Lee	Lou's assistant	Uncredited
1963	Heavens Above!	Man Buying Groceries	Uncredited
1965	Joey Boy	Tony	Uncredited
1965	Help!	Priest / Thug	Uncredited
1967	Just like a Woman		
1969	The Italian Job	Computer Room Official	
1972	Tales from the Crypt	2nd Blind Man	(segment 5 "Blind Alleys"), Uncredited
1972	Ooh... You Are Awful	Mancini	
1977	Ripping Yarns	1st native	Episode: "Across the Andes by Frog"
1988	Hard Road	Kelly's Father	
1989	Play Me Something	Birdwatcher	
