= Rose Hill (actress) =

English actress and operatic soprano (1914–2003)

- Rose Hill playing Madame Fanny in 'Allo 'Allo!
- Born: Rose Lilian Hill; 5 June 1914; London, England
- Died: 22 December 2003 (aged 89); London, England
- Resting place: Breakspear Crematorium, Ruislip, London, England
- Occupations: Actress and singer
- Years active: 1939–1994
- Spouse(s): John St Leger Davis (?–1985) (his death)
- Children: 1

Rose Lilian Hill (5 June 1914 – 22 December 2003) was an English actress and operatic soprano, who remains best known for her role as Madame Fanny La Fan in the British television series 'Allo 'Allo!. She was a member of the Royal Shakespeare Company.

== Biography ==
Hill was born in London and won a scholarship to the Guildhall School of Music and Drama. She started her career as a soprano in 1939, singing at the Sadler's Wells Opera (later English National Opera) in London; soubrette and lyric soprano roles such as Despina in Mozart's opera Così fan tutte. For the Glyndebourne Festival she sang Barbarina in Mozart's The Marriage of Figaro. In 1948 she sang Lucy in the world premiere of Benjamin Britten's adaptation of The Beggar's Opera.

Hill's career in television and film started with the 1958 film The Bank Raiders and ended in 1994 with a guest appearance in A Touch of Frost. Hill played various roles, including Miss La Creevy, in the Royal Shakespeare Company's play The Life and Adventures of Nicholas Nickleby (November 1980) at the Aldwych Theatre, an epic eight-hour stage adaptation of Charles Dickens' novel Nicholas Nickleby with Roger Rees, Emily Richard, Timothy Spall, John Woodvine, Edward Petherbridge, Ben Kingsley, Fulton Mackay, David Threlfall, Bob Peck and Christopher Benjamin. In June 1981 Hill reprised her roles in The Life and Adventures of Nicholas Nickleby for the Royal Shakespeare Company with Alun Armstrong and Ian McNeice added to the cast, Ben Kingsley and Timothy Spall having left the production. This version was filmed by Channel 4 in 1982 and broadcast as four two-hour episodes on consecutive nights in November 1982. In 1989 she played a witness to a kidnap in The Bill (Thames).

Her longest-running role as an actress was as Madame Fanny La Fan in the British sitcom 'Allo 'Allo!, in which she featured from 1982 to 1992. She also played Stanley Holloway's wife in the 1968 comedy series Thingumybob, and appeared briefly in the Dad's Army episode "Uninvited Guests", where she played an elderly ARP warden by the name of Mrs Cole.

Her film credits included roles in A Shot in the Dark (1964), Every Home Should Have One (1970), Tiffany Jones (1973), and House of Whipcord (1974).

Flanders and Swann wrote a song for Rose Hill called "A Word on My Ear".

== Death ==
She spent her final years in Denville Hall, a retirement home for actors, until her death in 2003; her 'Allo 'Allo! castmate Carmen Silvera also resided there.

== Filmography ==
Year	Title	Role	Notes
1958	The Bank Raiders	Mrs. Marling	
1963	Heavens Above!	Woman	Uncredited
1964	A Shot in the Dark	Soprano	
1970	Every Home Should Have One	Shopping Woman	
1972	For the Love of Ada	Third Mourner	
1973	Tiffany Jones	Prim Woman	
1974	House of Whipcord	Henry's Wife	
1980	The Wildcats of St Trinian's	Miss Martingale	
1990	Press Gang	Mrs. Williams	
1994	A Touch of Frost	Mrs Ryder	
