= Arthur Bostrom =

English actor (born 1955)

- Born: Arthur Bostrom; 6 January 1955 (age 71); Rugby, Warwickshire, England
- Years active: 1981–present
- Website: arthurbostrom.com

Arthur Bostrom FRGS (born 6 January 1955) is an English actor, best known for his role as Officer Crabtree in the long-running BBC TV sitcom 'Allo 'Allo!.

== Biography ==
=== Early life ===
Bostrom was born in Rugby, Warwickshire and attended Lawrence Sheriff School, where he was a contemporary with Kevin Warwick. He graduated from St Chad's College, University of Durham. In 1977 he performed at the Edinburgh Festival as part of Durham University Sensible Thespians (DUST). Besides his television career, he acted on the stage regularly, also being a trained life coach. He lived in Manchester for a long time.

=== Professional career ===
Bostrom appeared in Stephen Fry and Hugh Laurie's 1983 sketch show pilot The Crystal Cube which was not commissioned for a series. He had a small role in Miss Marple series 1 The Body in the Library in 1984.

He also had a small role in S01 E04 of Just Good Friends playing a gay guy in a pub, that Penny tried to pick up.

Bostrom played Officer Crabtree in 'Allo 'Allo!, a recurring character first appearing midway through the second series and remaining until the show's finale. Crabtree was played as a hopeless British undercover officer, disguised constantly as a French local policeman during the Second World War. Much of the character's humour derived from his supposed inability to pronounce French words correctly in conversation, which, on an English-language television programme, was represented by ludicrous exaggeration and mispronunciation of ordinary English words. For example, "Good morning" would be pronounced as "Good moaning", and "I was just passing by your window" as "I was just pissing by your wondow". Bostrom actually speaks fluent French.

In 2005, Bostrom guest-starred in Dead Man Walking, an audio drama based on the television series Sapphire and Steel. From December 2007 to January 2008, he continued his pantomime run when he appeared in a production as an ugly sister in Cinderella in Middlesbrough. On 8 January 2008, he appeared in an episode of Big Brother's Big Mouth on E4. He discussed events in the house after introducing the show in the familiar character of Officer Crabtree.

On 3 March 2010, he appeared as a vicar in the BBC One daytime soap opera Doctors and again in Doctors (17:163) on 25 January 2016 as sommelier Murray Bathurst.

Bostrom appeared (alongside fellow 'Allo 'Allo! alumnus Sam Kelly) in the BBC radio dramatisation of The Good Soldier Švejk by Jaroslav Hašek in November 2008, playing the part of Wendler.

In November 2012, Bostrom appeared in Hebburn as a newspaper editor.

In 2017, he appeared in the BBC series Father Brown as Richie Queenan in episode 5.12 "The Theatre of the Invisible".

In 2017, he appeared on a celebrity edition of Pointless.

In October 2018, he reprised his role from 'Allo 'Allo! in the book Good Moaning France: Officer Crabtree's Fronch Phrose Berk, in which he attempts to teach others to 'spook the Fronch longwodge'.
