= Hilary Minster =

English actor

- Born: Roger Michael Hilary Minster; 21 March 1944; Surrey, England
- Died: 24 November 1999 (aged 55); London, England
- Occupation: Actor
- Children: 4
- Parents: John P.Minster; Barbara H. Cochran-Carr / Minster

Roger Michael Hilary Minster (21 March 1944 – 24 November 1999) was an English character actor.

== Life and career ==
Born in Surrey, England, he is best known for playing General Erich Von Klinkerhoffen in the sitcom 'Allo 'Allo! between 1984 and 1992. Other credits include Crossroads; Tinker Tailor Soldier Spy; and a semi-regular role in Secret Army (the series of which 'Allo 'Allo was a parody) as Hauptmann Muller. Minster also had a brief period writing scripts with Kenneth Williams for the latter's International Cabaret television show.

In 1974, Minster appeared as Lieutenant Lightfoot in the Upstairs, Downstairs episode "Facing Fearful Odds". He played the motorcyclist in the TV series The Long Chase. He also appeared twice in Doctor Who, as the Thal soldier Marat in Planet of the Daleks (1973) and as an unnamed Thal soldier who dangles Sarah Jane Smith from the rocket gantry in Genesis of the Daleks (1975) alongside fellow 'Allo 'Allo actor Guy Siner. This makes him one of the few Doctor Who actors to have played two characters from the same alien race. He also had a major part in another episode of a successful science fiction series playing Yagon in "Achilles Heel,' an episode of The Tomorrow People, in 1978.

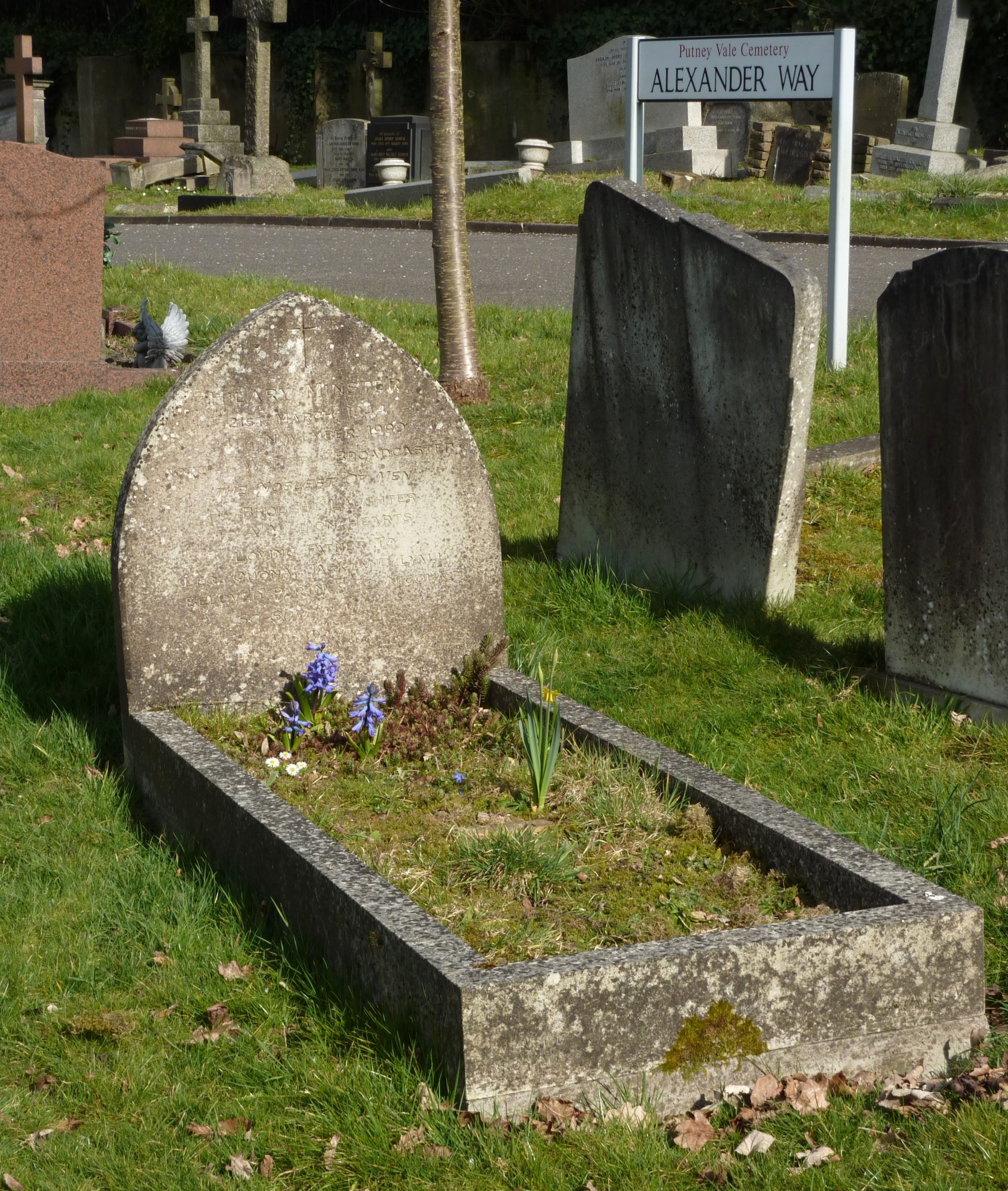
Hilary Minster's grave at Putney Vale Cemetery, London, in 2015

His film appearances were scarce but include roles in A Bridge Too Far (1977), The Godsend (1980), Cry Freedom (1987) and The Girl in a Swing (1988).

He was a presenter and producer of Central Independent Television's flagship ethnic minorities current affairs programme Here and Now during the early 1980s.

Minster provided the narration for the controversial Central television documentary The Men Who Killed Kennedy, which outlined various theories concerning the assassination of the American president John F. Kennedy.

== Death ==
Minster died from cancer in London on 24 November 1999. His body was buried at Putney Vale Cemetery. The epitaph on the gravestone reads:

"The noblest of men. He brought laughter to a million hearts. Loving father to Leo, Quona, Jack and Lyall. Beloved partner to Nicola. So sorely missed. My wonder."

== Filmography ==
Year	Title	Role	Notes
1969	Battle of Britain	Pilot – Falke's Crew	Uncredited
1977	A Bridge Too Far	British Medical Officer	
1980	The Godsend	Reporter	
1987	Cry Freedom	1st Passport Control officer	
1988	The Girl in a Swing	Joe	
