= Jack Haig (actor) =

British actor (1913–1989)

- Haig as Monsieur Roger Leclerc in 'Allo 'Allo!
- Born: John Cecil Coppin; 5 January 1913; London, England
- Died: 4 July 1989 (aged 76); London, England
- Years active: 1959–1989
- Spouse: Sybil Dunn (m. 1938; died 1988)
- Children: 1
- Relatives: Coral Drouyn (niece)

Jack Haig (born John Cecil Coppin; 5 January 1913 – 4 July 1989) was an English actor who specialised in supporting roles, mainly in television comedy. He was best known for playing Monsieur Roger Leclerc in the British sitcom 'Allo 'Allo! between 1982 and 1989.

== Biography ==
Haig was the son of music hall actors Bertha Baker and Charles Coppin, whose act went under the name "Haig and Esco." He was seen in a long list of British television favourites including: Hugh and I, Are You Being Served?, Terry and June and Dad's Army (although he turned down the role of Corporal Jones which then went to Clive Dunn) . He was in the Crossroads soap opera as occasional character Archie Gibbs from 1967 to 1982 and a couple of cinema films. He achieved his greatest success as Monsieur Roger Leclerc in BBC's 'Allo 'Allo!, a role he played until his death. His last appearance was in the final episode of series 5, where he impersonated a Spanish guitarist, alongside Kenneth Connor (Monsieur Alfonse), who had an Enigma machine hidden in his accordion. He is remembered for his signature line, "It is I, Leclerc!"

He appeared in pantomime at Wimbledon in Babes in the Wood in 1965 and again in 1967 as the Emperor of China in Aladdin alongside Bruce Forsyth and Tommy Trinder.

His earlier television work included a regular spot as a comic on The One O'clock Show and Happy Go Lucky, a children's television show during the 1960s. The One O'Clock Show was shown every weekday in the Tyne Tees Television area of ITV. He usually appeared in sketches as Wacky Jackie, generally playing the fool in a music hall comedy style.

In 1989, Haig became too ill to work and later died of stomach cancer. His wife was revue actress Sybil Dunn, who had died the previous year, just two days before their golden wedding anniversary. They had one daughter.

== TV and filmography ==
- 'Allo 'Allo! .... Monsieur Roger Leclerc (51 episodes) (1982–1989)
- Sorry! .... Gravedigger (1 episode) (1982)
- Are You Being Served? .... Old Gentleman (2 episodes) (1981)
- Terry & June .... Joe Davies (1 episode ) (1982)
- Yesterday's Hero .... Sam's Crony (1979)
- Emily .... Taxi Driver (1976)
- Adventures of a Taxi Driver .... Vicar (1976)
- Crossroads .... Archie Gibbs (19 episodes) (1967–1982)
- Dad's Army (2 episodes) (1969–1975)
- Go for a Take .... Security Man (1972)
- Keep It in the Family .... Des (6 episodes) (1971)
- Here Come the Double Deckers (2 episodes) (1970)
- The Intrepid Mr. Twigg .... Garage Owner (1968)
- No Strings (1967)
- The Ghost Goes Gear .... Old Edwards (1966)
- United! .... Chas Coggan (unknown episodes) (1965)
- Hugh and I .... Arthur Wormold (4 episodes) (1963–1966)
- The One O'clock Show .... Wacky Jackie:" Tyne Tees TV (1959 -1964)
