= Richard Gibson =

Ugandan-born British actor (born 1954)

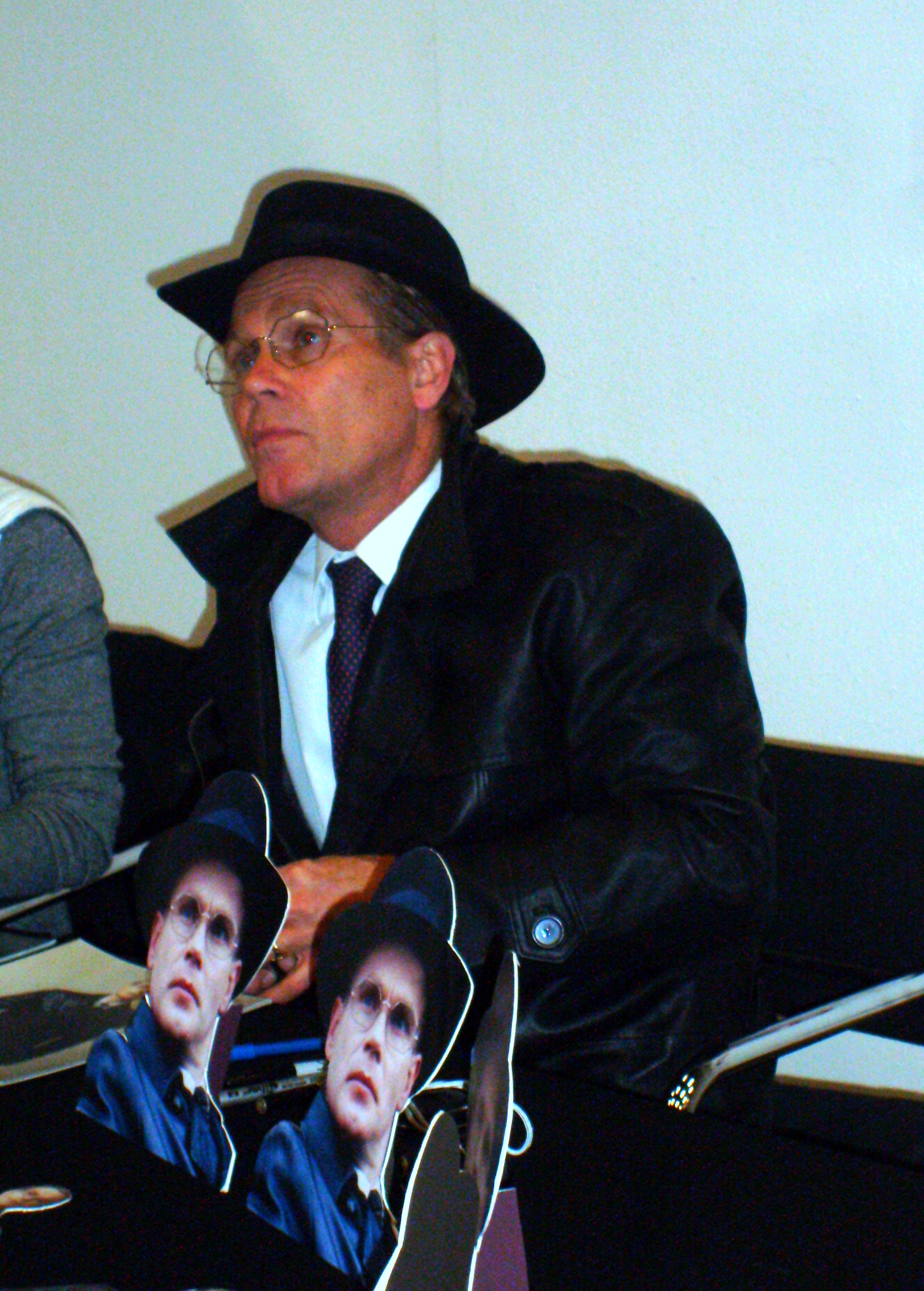
- Gibson in 2011
- Born: 1 January 1954 (age 72); Kampala, Uganda Protectorate
- Education: Royal Central School of Speech and Drama
- Occupation: Actor
- Spouse: Kate Gibson
- Children: 2

Richard Gibson (born 1 January 1954) is a British actor, best known for his role as the archetypal Gestapo Officer Herr Otto Flick in the BBC long-running sitcom series, 'Allo 'Allo!.

== Early life and education ==
Gibson was born in Kampala, Uganda, before the country gained independence from the UK. He was a chorister at St Paul's Cathedral and educated at its prep school, St Paul's Cathedral School, followed by Radley College, a boarding public school for boys, near the town of Abingdon-on-Thames, in Oxfordshire, and the Central School of Speech and Drama. He has said that, as a chorister, he sang at the funeral service of Sir Winston Churchill in 1965, and was paid £2 10s for his work on the day (equivalent to £42.33 in 2025).

== Life and career ==
Gibson was a main cast member in 'Allo 'Allo! for all but the final series. Dressed in an ankle-length leather coat and with the obligatory stiff-legged limp and walking stick, Herr Flick spent his life suppressing peasants, seducing Helga, the German town Commandant's assistant, and vainly trying to get his hands on the original of the painting The Fallen Madonna with the Big Boobies by Van Klomp.

Gibson then toured with the group when 'Allo 'Allo! transferred to the stage and had successful tours both in the United Kingdom and abroad. The stage version of the show gave rein to his other skills, and he was able to demonstrate his mastery of the violin.

He played Sunning in the 1971 BBC1 television series Tom Brown's Schooldays. His first film role of note was in the 1971 film The Go Between, in which he played Marcus Maudsley, school friend of Leo Colston (Dominic Guard) who passed messages between Julie Christie and Alan Bates, and he also played young Tony Farrant in the 1973 film version of England Made Me. He has also played a wide variety of roles on stage and the TV screen, and in 2006 was a regular guest on The Daily Telegraph's World Cup Pubcast, where he usually took the role of Herr Flick, providing a more biased view of the proceedings. He guest starred in the Doctor Who audio dramas Flip-Flop (2003) and Warlock's Cross (2018) for Big Finish Productions..

He has divided his time between Ireland and the UK, and continues to work in films, television, and theatre as well as working as a sub-editor for newspaper publications.

Owing to the enduring popularity of 'Allo! 'Allo!, he and Kim Hartman have formed a Flick and Helga fan club and made numerous cabaret appearances, using songs and sketches in character. In 2012, as guest speakers on the Fred Olsen ships, Boudicca and Balmoral, they travelled to the Canary Islands and up the Amazon River. In 2014, they were also guest performers at the Malfest Arts Festival in Malpas, Cheshire, and appeared at the War and Peace Show at Folkestone Racecourse in Kent with many of the prominent 'Allo 'Allo! cast, excepting Gorden Kaye. In 2014 Gibson appeared with fellow 'Allo, 'Allo! cast members at the Sofia International Film Festival. Gibson also works as a radio actor, scriptwriter and voiceover artist.
