= Carmen Silvera =

Canadian-British actress (1922–2002)

- Silvera as Edith Artois in 'Allo 'Allo!
- Born: Carmen Blanche Silvera; 2 June 1922; Toronto, Ontario, Canada
- Died: 3 August 2002 (aged 80); London, England
- Resting place: Golders Green Crematorium, London, England
- Education: London Academy of Music and Dramatic Art
- Occupation: Actress
- Years active: 1940s- (theatre) 1962–2001 (TV)
- Spouse: John Cunliffe (m. 1949, divorced)

Carmen Blanche Silvera (2 June 1922 – 3 August 2002) was a British actress. Born in Canada of Spanish descent, she moved to Coventry, England, with her family when she was a child. She started working in theatre and appeared on television regularly in the 1960s, and achieved mainstream fame in the 1980s with her starring role in the British television sitcom 'Allo 'Allo! as Edith Artois.

== Early life ==
Silvera was born in 1922 in Toronto, Canada and during World War II, was evacuated to Montreal narrowly escaping death when, at the last minute, her name was taken off the passenger list of the liner Athenia that was sunk by the enemy shortly afterwards.

== Early theatre career ==
In Canada, she took classes with the Ballets Russes and appeared in three of its productions. On her return to Britain, she felt called to acting and trained at the London Academy of Music and Dramatic Art, before gaining experience in repertory theatre.

== Career (television) ==
Silvera first made her name as a television actress in the 1960s British police drama Z-Cars in 1962, going on to appear as Camilla Hope in the BBC soap opera Compact from 1964 to 1965. She played Mrs Van Schuyler in Lillie in 1978, ITV's drama series about the future Edward VII's mistress, Lillie Langtry.

She appeared twice in Doctor Who, in the serials The Celestial Toymaker as Clara the Clown, Mrs. Wiggs, and the Queen of Hearts, and as Ruth in Invasion of the Dinosaurs. In 1970 she appeared in the Dad's Army episode Mum's Army as Fiona Gray, the love-interest for Captain Mainwaring, a role especially written for her by David Croft. She also had roles in British sex comedies, such as Clinic Exclusive (1971), On the Game (1974) and Keep It Up Downstairs (1976). Her longest-running role came as Edith, the antagonistic wife of opportunistic cafe owner René Artois, throughout the history of the 'Allo 'Allo! series from 1982 to 1992. Madame Edith was often heard singing to a piano accompaniment and when the show’s theme tune was released on LP in the 1980s Silvera sang the full song, starting “'Allo 'Allo, we meet again”.

She appeared with Ted Rogers at the New Wimbledon Theatre in 1997 in Jimmy Perry's stage musical That's Showbiz. Her West End stage appearances included roles in Waters of the Moon, starring Ingrid Bergman, Hobson's Choice with Penelope Keith, A Coat of Varnish and School for Wives, which was directed by Peter Hall. She also played a grandmother in the 1997 film La Passione.

In 1991, she was the subject of a This Is Your Life television programme. She did charity work for the Grand Order of Lady Ratlings, the ladies' branch of the Grand Order of Water Rats.

== Personal life and death ==
Silvera was enthusiastic about horse racing after her grandfather took her to a race at Warwick. She won a bet on Light of Love at the race, which came in at 7/1.

In Coventry in 1949, Silvera married John Cunliffe, an actor she had met at repertory theatre in Tonbridge, Kent in 1941. She divorced following a miscarriage and never remarried. A heavy smoker, she died of lung cancer on 3 August 2002, aged 80, at the Denville Hall retirement home for actors.

== Family ==
Silvera's Jamaican-born father, Roland Silvera (1895–1986), was a well-known flat-green bowls player and a member of Stoke Bowling Club, Coventry. After immigrating to Canada in 1910 and becoming a ship hand, Roland fought for the Canadian Expeditionary Force in World War I.

Roland married Dorothy White in Warwick in 1918 and returned to Canada, where Carmen and her brother Roger were born. They emigrated back to Warwickshire in 1924. Roland served as President of Warwickshire County Bowls Association in 1970, in which year the County side achieved their one and only success in the English Bowling Association Middleton Cup competition, beating Middlesex in the final. Coventry & District Bowls Association runs an annual competition for the Silvera Shield.
