= Kim Hartman =

British actress

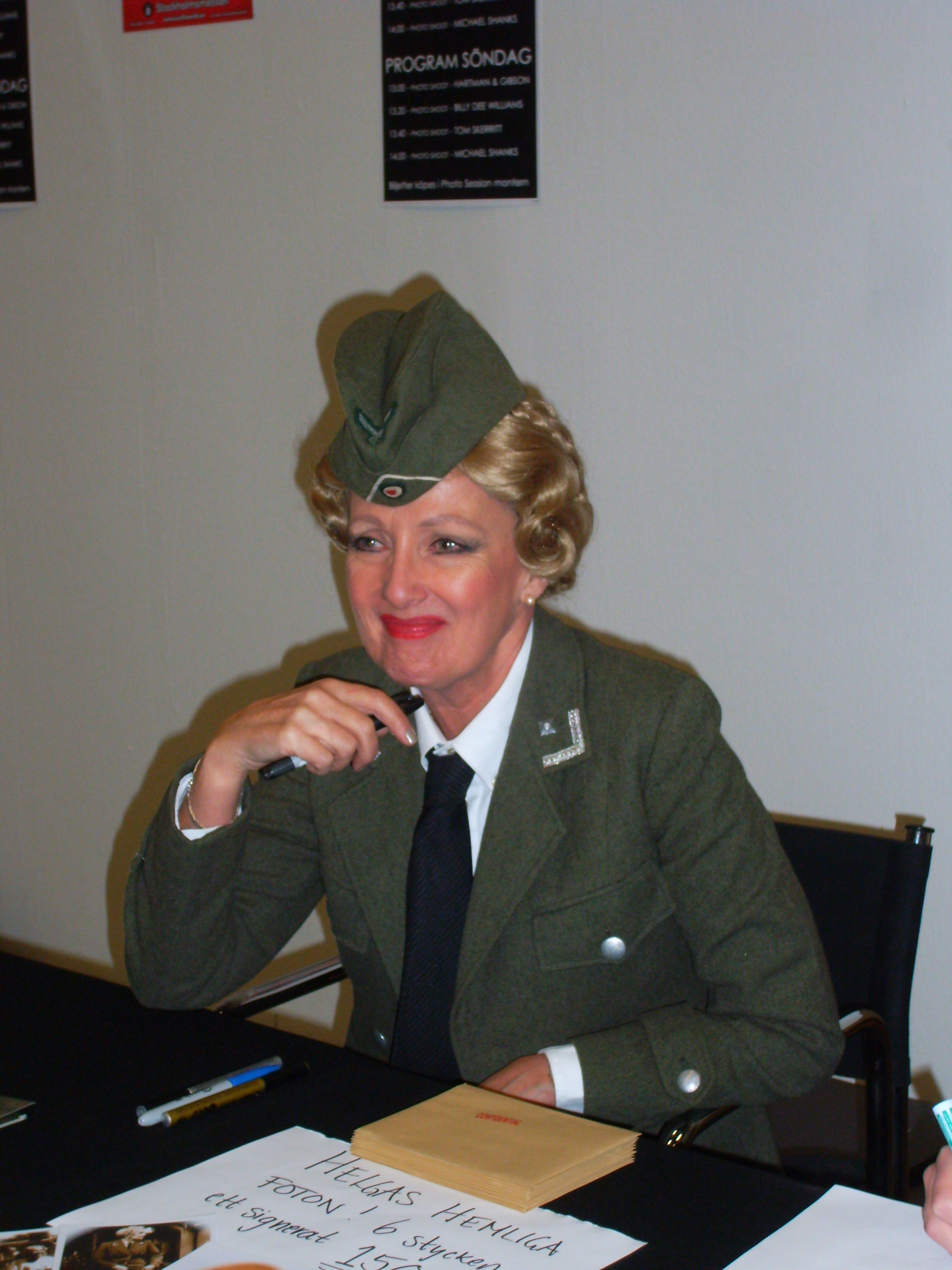
- Hartman in 2011
- Born: Kim Lesley Hartman; 11 January 1952 (age 74); Hammersmith, London, England
- Occupation: Actress
- Years active: 1976–present
- Spouse: John Nolan (m. 1975; died 2026)
- Children: 2

Kim Lesley Hartman (born 11 January 1952) is an English actress, best known for her role as Private Helga Geerhart in the BBC television sitcom 'Allo 'Allo! (1982–1992).

She was educated at The King's High School for Girls, Warwick. and the Webber Douglas Academy of Dramatic Art, London.

In addition to 'Allo 'Allo!, Hartman's television credits also include Casualty and The Brittas Empire, The Kelly Monteith Show, Fifteen Storeys High, Miss Jones and Son and Grange Hill (3 series). Her stage work includes the West End stage production of 'Allo 'Allo!, Margaret in My Mother Said I Never Should, Vera in Stepping Out, Josie in Steaming (New Zealand), Philippa James in Double Double, Sheila in Relatively Speaking, Jacqueline in Don't Dress for Dinner (West End 1991 and New Zealand tour 1993), Alison in Mum's the Word, Doris Wagstaff in the farce Dry Rot, Brigit in Sitting Pretty, Judith Bliss in Hay Fever and Vicky in My Fat Friend.

Radio plays include Lord Sky, Mary Yellan in Jamaica Inn, Daisy Chain, a Sapphire and Steel audio drama and an audio book entitled The Worst Street in London.

Hartman presented a travel programme shown on Travel Channel (UK), Cruising to the Northern Lights.

In June 2023, Hartman appeared in an episode of the BBC soap opera Doctors as Bernadette Hilsum.
