= Nicholas Frankau =

English actor

- Born: 16 July 1954 (age 71); Stockport, Cheshire, England
- Occupations: Actor; performer; software engineer

Nicholas Frankau (born 16 July 1954) is an English actor best known for playing the role of Flt. Lt. Carstairs in the British sitcom television series 'Allo 'Allo! whose recurring theme involves failure to get back to Britain.

== Early life and career ==
Frankau attended Harrow School and graduated in 1976 from St. Catharine's College, Cambridge. Apart from 'Allo 'Allo!, Frankau appeared in Blake's 7 (1980), Play for Today (1983 and 1984) and C.A.T.S. Eyes (1985), among others.

During the 1980s he worked as a supply teacher, teaching Maths in the Jewish Free School in Camden Town and Coleridge Community College in Cambridge. He also taught at County Upper School, Bury St Edmunds in the '90s, and Newmarket Upper School, Newmarket, Suffolk. He no longer acts regularly but lives and works in Cambridge working as a software engineer, having previously worked for Qualcomm, Nokia and Symbian.
