= Kirsten Cooke =

British actress

- Born: Kirstin Hiern-Cooke; 4 October 1952 (age 73); Cuckfield, Sussex, England
- Occupations: Actress, presenter
- Children: 4

Kirsten Cooke (born 4 October 1952) is an English stage actress who trained at the Webber Douglas Academy of Dramatic Art, London. Almost all of her acting work has been in comedy, notably in the BBC television series 'Allo 'Allo!.

== Early life ==
Cooke attended Horsham High School for Girls (now Tanbridge House School), a girls' grammar school.

== Career ==
She is best known for her role as resistance fighter Michelle Dubois in the British television series 'Allo 'Allo!, produced by the BBC. Her character is associated with the catchphrase "Listen very carefully - I shall say this only once". Before then, Cooke was an occasional member of the ensemble of comedy actors who appeared in Dave Allen's sketches in several of his BBC series. She also starred in several episodes of the BBC children's comedy series ChuckleVision.

Her other television credits include Woolcott, Rings on Their Fingers, The Dawson Watch, The Upper Hand and Down to Earth. She also appeared as a panellist on Blankety Blank in 1984.
