= Gorden Kaye =

British actor (1941–2017)

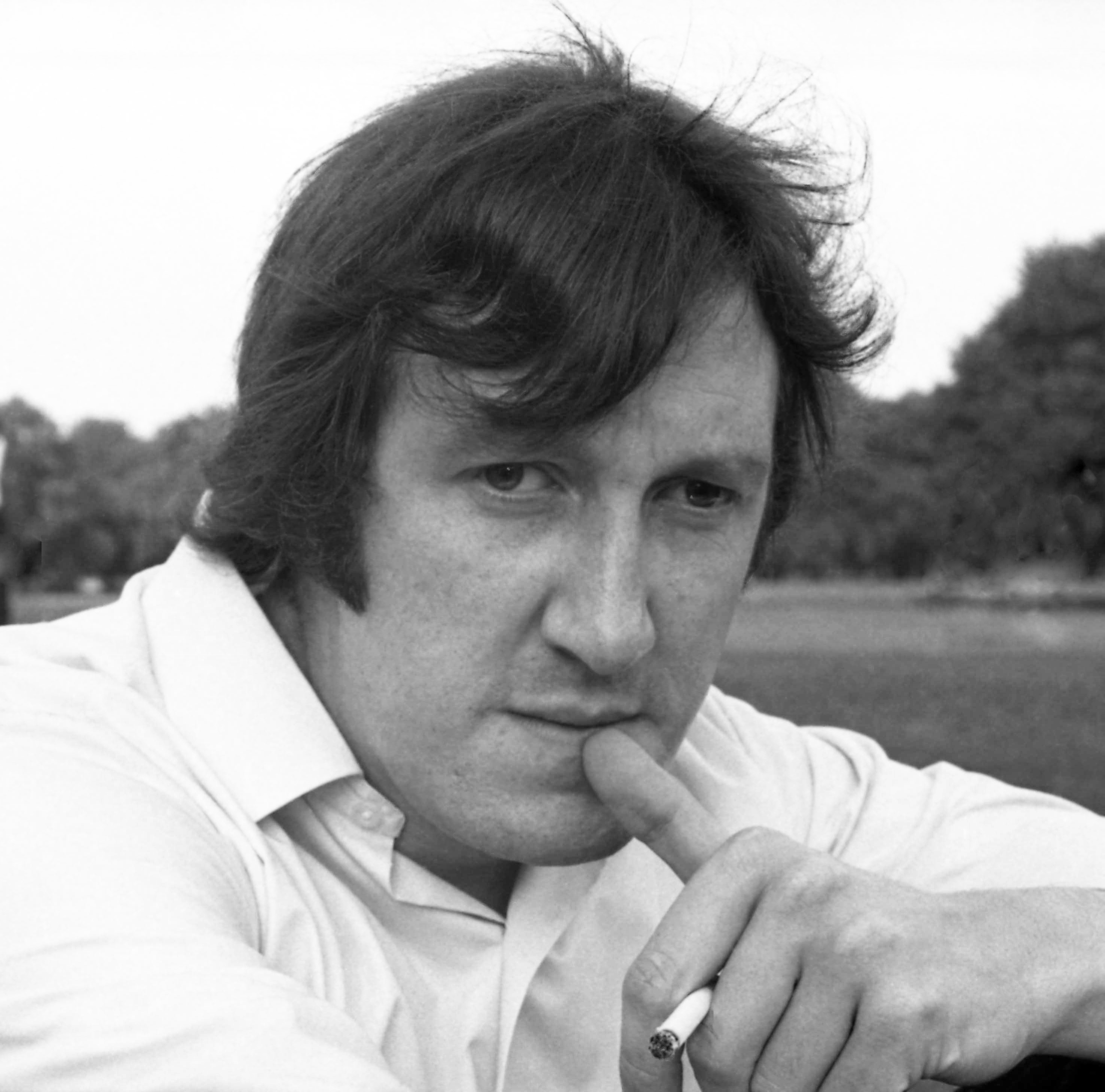
- Kaye in 1974
- Born: Gordon Irving Kaye; 7 April 1941; Huddersfield, West Riding of Yorkshire, England
- Died: 23 January 2017 (aged 75); Knaresborough, North Yorkshire, England
- Other name: Gordon Kaye
- Occupation: Actor
- Years active: 1968–2007

Gordon Irving Kaye (7 April 1941 – 23 January 2017), known professionally as Gorden Kaye, was an English actor. He was best known for playing womanising café owner René Artois in the television comedy series 'Allo 'Allo!.

== Early life ==
Kaye was born on 7 April 1941 in Huddersfield, West Riding of Yorkshire, the only child of Harold and Gracie Kaye; Gracie was 42 when she gave birth. Harold Kaye was a lorry driver in the ARP during the Second World War, and at other times worked as an engineering operative in a tractor factory.

When young, Kaye played rugby league for Moldgreen ARLFC before studying at King James's Grammar School, Almondbury, Huddersfield. He worked in hospital radio in Huddersfield (interviewing Ken Dodd and then the Beatles in 1963 when they played the Ritz in the town), and worked in textile mills, a wine factory, and a tractor factory.

== Career ==
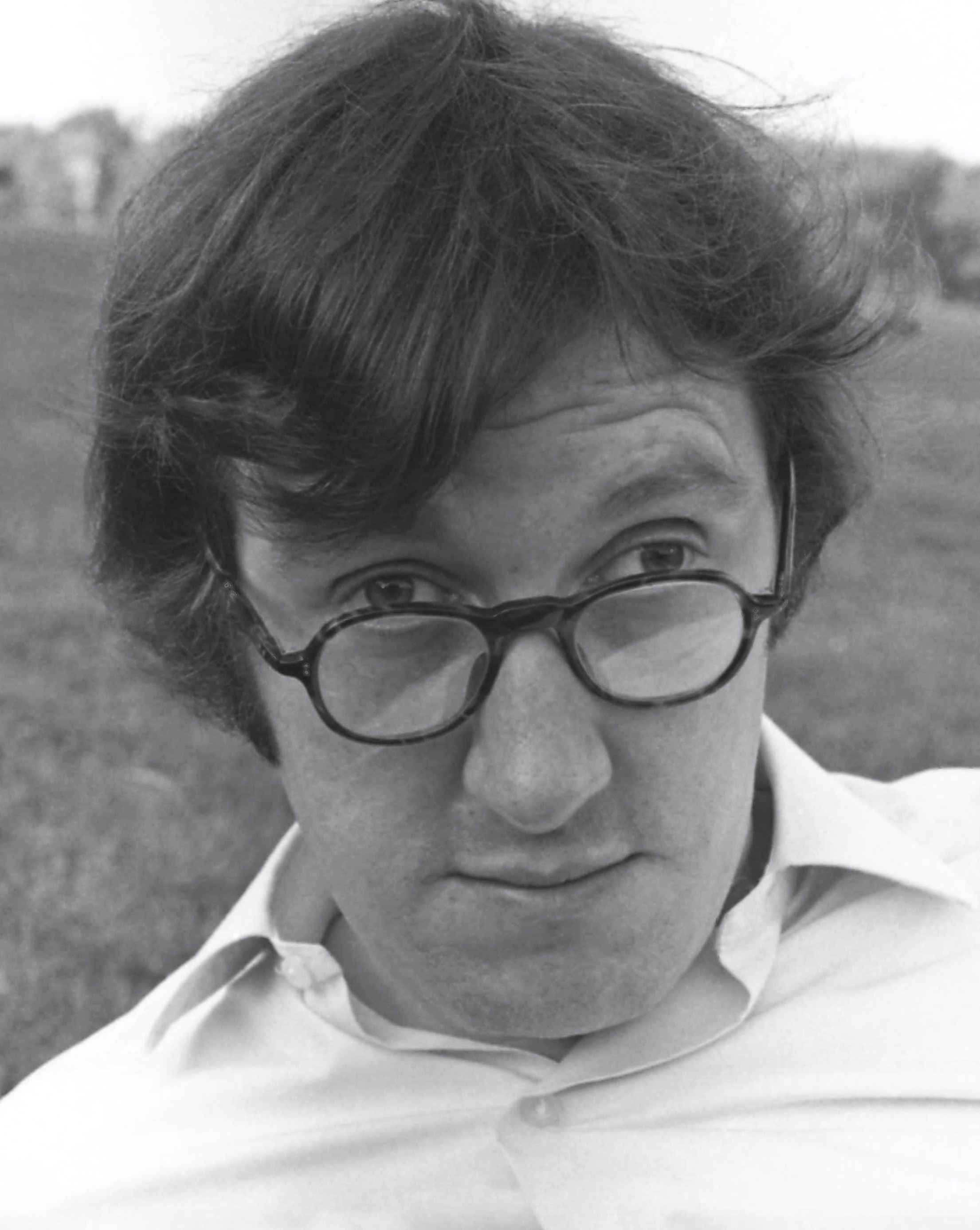
Kaye in London, 1974

Kaye had appeared in a radio play directed by Alan Ayckbourn and also in a television play from Manchester. Ayckbourn suggested that he audition for the Bolton Octagon Theatre; he was offered a contract and his roles there included Pishchik in The Cherry Orchard followed by roles in The Homecoming, The Imaginary Invalid, Luther, and a double-bill of Oedipus and Cyclops.

His first TV role was in the BBC's Champion House (1968). Having been seen by Pat Phoenix in Little Malcolm by David Halliwell at Bolton, he was cast as Bernard Butler, the nephew of Elsie Tanner (Phoenix), in the soap opera Coronation Street in 1969. He later made an impression on producer/writer David Croft following guest roles in It Ain't Half Hot Mum and Come Back Mrs. Noah, and also the comedy series Citizen Smith by John Sullivan.

He appeared in the 1978 comedy short The Waterloo Bridge Handicap, starring Leonard Rossiter, and featured as Dines in the feature film version of Porridge (1979) alongside Ronnie Barker. He also appeared in the TV show about a Yorkshire vet, All Creatures Great and Small and in the private detective series Shoestring. In 1981, Kaye appeared as Frank Broadhurst in the children's drama serial Codename Icarus.

Kaye appeared in three episodes of Croft's British department store sitcom Are You Being Served? and was later offered the lead role in a series he had written called Oh Happy Band!, but Kaye was unavailable and the part went to Harry Worth. Oh Happy Band! lasted one series.

Kaye had a small part in Terry Gilliam's film Brazil as desk clerk M.O.I. Lobby Porter and appeared in Gilliam's 1977 film Jabberwocky as Sister Jessica.

He played Dr Grant in a television adaptation of Mansfield Park and Lymoges, Duke of Austria in the 1984 BBC production of King John by Shakespeare. He also toured in the National Theatre production of As You Like It, as Touchstone. The same year, he appeared as hard man Sammy, an enforcer employed by agoraphobic bookmaker Albert Wendle in the Minder episode "Get Daley!"

In 1990, Kaye played the fictional local television presenter Maynard Lavery in an edition of Last of the Summer Wine. In the early 1990s he made a guest appearance in a Christmas special of Family Fortunes, in which he served as team captain and placed host Les Dennis on a special "Double Big Money" round for Dennis to score more than one hundred points to double the charity prize money, which he did. In 1995 Kaye played Monsieur Pamplemousse in a BBC Radio three-part adaptation of Michael Bond's 1990 novel Monsieur Pamplemousse Investigates.

=== Allo 'Allo! ===
In 1982, David Croft sent Kaye the script for the pilot episode of 'Allo 'Allo! inviting him to play the central character of René Artois. He accepted and appeared in all 85 episodes (the main series ran from 1984, two years after the pilot, until 1992) and 1,200 performances of the stage version.

Kaye was the subject of This Is Your Life in 1986 when he was surprised by Eamonn Andrews at the curtain call of the West End stage version of 'Allo 'Allo! at the Prince of Wales Theatre.

Kaye returned as René Artois in a 2007 one-off television revival of 'Allo 'Allo! and in a stage show in Brisbane, Australia, at the Twelfth Night Theatre in June and July, alongside Sue Hodge as Mimi Labonq and Guy Siner as Lieutenant Gruber. Most of the other characters were portrayed by Australian actors, including Steven Tandy, Chloe Dallimore, and Jason Gann.

== Personal life ==
Kaye's autobiography, René and Me: An Autobiography (co-written with Hilary Bonner), was published in 1989. In the book, he described his experiences as a shy, gay, overweight, typecast youth. He admitted spending three or four evenings with male prostitutes from a Soho club, later saying it was a "silly thing to do". The unusual spelling of his name (usually spelt "Gordon") was the result of a British Actors' Equity Association typing error; he preferred the mistake over his original name.

Kaye suffered serious life-threatening head injuries in a car accident while driving his Honda CRX, during the Burns' Day Storm in London on 25 January 1990. Although he could not remember any details of the incident, he retained a scar on his forehead from a piece of wooden advertising boarding that had smashed through the car windscreen. He was rescued by the police and taken to Charing Cross Hospital. Writing in his memoirs, 'Allo 'Allo! co-writer Jeremy Lloyd said he visited Kaye in hospital, adding, "I believe part of his recovery was due to his agent getting a video and showing reruns of 'Allo 'Allo! to remind him who he was." While recovering in hospital from emergency brain surgery to treat injuries sustained in the accident, Kaye was photographed and interviewed by two Sunday Sport journalists, Gary Thompson and Ray Levine. On Kaye's behalf, his agent Peter Froggatt, sued the newspaper, but the Court of Appeal held, in Kaye v Robertson, that there was no remedy in English law for an invasion of privacy.

== Death ==
Kaye suffered from dementia and spent the last two years of his life in a care home in Knaresborough, where he died, on 23 January 2017, aged 75. His funeral was held at Huddersfield Parish Church on 17 February. His co-stars from 'Allo 'Allo! Vicki Michelle, Sue Hodge and Kim Hartman attended, as did Ken Morley, who gave a tribute. The unofficial Yorkshire anthem "On Ilkla Moor Baht 'at" was sung at the service.

== Filmography ==
Year	Title	Role	Notes
1968	Champion House	Railway Guard	Episode: "Go West, Young Man"
1968	Inside George Webley	Clerk	Episode: "Are You Sure or Only Positive"
1969	All Star Comedy Carnival	Bernard Butler	Television film
1969–1970	Coronation Street	Bernard Butler	37 episodes
1971–1973	The Flaxton Boys	Delivery Man / Engine Driver / PC Joseph	4 episodes
1972	Scene	Garage Man	Episode: "Bank Holiday"
1972	Villains	Mervyn	Episode: "Sand Dancer"
1973	The Gordon Peters Show	Unknown	2 episodes
1973	Hey Brian!	Unknown	Episode: "Episode #1.3"
1973	Follyfoot	Man with Court Order	Episode: "The Dream"
1973	Stars on Sunday	Barnaby Rudge	Episode: "Glories of Christmas"
1973–1975	Emmerdale	Gerry	7 episodes
1974	'Til Death Do Us Part	Television Licence Inspector	Episode: "Episode #5.1"
1974	My Old Man	1st Customer	Episode: "Episode #1.2"
1974	South Riding	Turnbull	Episode: "Dreams and Destinations"
1975	The Growing Pains of PC Penrose	PC Knowles	Episode: "Among Those Appearing"
1976	Escape from the Dark	Unknown	
1976	Well Anyway	Waiter	2 episodes
1976	Sykes	Mr. Macclesfield	Episode: "Bath"
1977	Jabberwocky	Sister Jessica	
1977	The Boys and Mrs B	Mr. Hobkirk	Television film
1977	Mr. Big	Chauffeur	Episode: "The Sheiks"
1977	It Ain't Half Hot Mum	Burly Soldier	Episode: "The Pay Off"
1977	Backs to the Land	Corporal	Episode: "All Mod Con-Tricks"
1977–1978	Come Back Mrs Noah	Nicky Manson / Television Presenter	6 episodes
1978	The Foundation	Mr. Thrush	Episode: "Business Not Quite as Usual"
1978	All Creatures Great and Small	Kit Bilton	Episode: "Pups, Pigs and Pickle"
1978	The Waterloo Bridge Handicap	Chubby Chap	Short film
1978–1980	Born and Bred	Ray Benge	11 episodes
1978–1981	Are You Being Served?	Mr. Fortescue / The Plastic Mac / Mr. Tomiades	3 episodes
1979	The Strange Affair of Adelaide Harris	Adam Alexander	Episode: "Episode #1.6"
1979	Porridge	Dines	
1979	Shoestring	Tom Clarke	Episode: "Higher Ground"
1979	Citizen Smith	'His Man'	Episode: "The Party's Over"
1980	God's Wonderful Railway	Jem	Episode: "The Permanent Way - Part 1"
1980	Just Liz	Mr. Chatto	3 episodes
1980	Oh Happy Band	Record Producer	Episode: "A Record to Be Proud of"
1980	Both Ends Meet	Mr. Wright	Television film
1980	Kelly Monteith	Unknown	2 episodes
1981	Sredni Vashtar	Ogden	Short film
1981	Codename Icarus	Frank Broadhurst	5 episodes
1981	Zanussi - The Application of Science	Warehouse Gaffer (uncredited)	Video
1982	Fame is the Spur	Birley Artingstall	2 episodes
1982	Sheena Easton: Machinery	Boss	Music video
1982–1983	Let There Be Love	Ernest Thompson / Bertram	2 episodes
1982–1992	'Allo 'Allo!	Rene Artois	Nominated - British Academy Television Award for Best Entertainment Performance; 85 episodes
1983	Dead on Time	Moonie	Short film
1983	Don't Rock the Boat	Mr. Danby	Episode: "Top of the Bill"
1983	Mansfield Park	Dr. Grant	6 episodes
1983–1985	Going to Work	Mr. Prentice	2 episodes
1984	Minder	Sammy	Episode: "Get Daley"
1984	Play for Today	Vicar	Episode: "Rainy Day Women"
1984	The Gentle Touch	Fat Henry	2 episodes
1984	The Life and Death of King John	Lymoges / King of Austria	Television film
1984	Much Ado About Nothing	First Watch	Television film
1985	Brazil	M.O.I. Lobby Porter	
1985	Screen Two	Buff	Episode: "In the Secret State"
1985–1986	Wogan	Rene Artois	3 episodes
1987	Saturday Superstore	Rene Artois	Episode: "Episode #5.16"
1988	The Les Dennis Laughter Show	Rene Artois	Episode: "Episode #2.5"
1988	Saturday Night Out	Rene Artois	Episode: "Episode #1.3"
1988	'Allo 'Allo at the London Palladium	Rene Artois	Television special
1989	A Night of Comic Relief 2	Rene Artois	Television special
1990	Last of the Summer Wine	Maynard Lavery	Episode: "The Last Surviving Maurice Chevalier Impression"
1990	The Tale of Little Pig Robinson	The Mate	Television film
1992	Noel's House Party	Rene Artois	Episode: "Episode #1.10"
1993	Screen One	Nickson	Episode: "The Bullion Boys"
1994	Live & Kicking	Rene Artois	Episode: "Episode #1.20"
1996	The Generation Game	Rene Artois	Episode: "Episode #18.4"
2001–2004	Revolver	The Farmer	6 episodes
2007	The Return of 'Allo 'Allo!	Rene Artois	Television film

== Books ==
- René and Me: An Autobiography, co-written with Hilary Bonner, Sidgwick & Jackson, September 1989, ISBN 0-283-99965-9
