= Richard Lumsden =

English actor, writer and composer

- Born: Richard James Lumsden; 24 June 1965 (age 61); Lancashire, England
- Education: Lady Manners School
- Alma mater: Guildford School of Acting
- Occupations: Actor, writer, composer, musician
- Years active: 1988–present
- Spouse: Sophie Thompson (m. 1995; sep. 2015)
- Children: 2
- Website: www.richardlumsden.com

Richard James Lumsden (born 24 June 1965) is an English actor, writer, composer and musician. He has made regular appearances on TV and film throughout his career. Notable series include Channel 4's Emmy-award winning Sugar Rush, Is It Legal?, Wonderful You and The Singapore Grip. He played Ray in Radio 4's long-running comedy Clare in the Community.

== Career ==
=== Television ===
Lumsden's early television work includes Foggy in two series of First of the Summer Wine, Nutter in The Sharp End, Waterfront Beat, One Foot In The Grave, The Brittas Empire, Nelson's Column, Grace and Favour, Coogan's Run - Death Of A Salesman, and Hornblower.

He played Colin in three series of Simon Nye's Is it Legal?, Henry in Wonderful You, Charles in All About Me, Roger in The House That Jack Built, as well as episodes of Dangerfield, People Like Us, Hardware, Love Soup, The Croydon Poisonings. Nathan in two series of Sugar Rush, and appearances in Party Animals, Suburban Shootout, Dis/connected, U Be Dead, and Free Agents. He appeared as Martin in series three of The Catherine Tate Show, and Arnold, an ex-boyfriend of Clare Bates in EastEnders.

Other tv shows include; Grownups, Summer In Transylvania, Garrow's Law, two series of The Impressions Show, three series of Life Of Riley, Vexed, Midsomer Murders, Rebecca Front's Little Cracker, By Any Means, All At Sea, as well as sixteen appearances as different characters in Holby City, Casualty and Doctors, all for the BBC.

More recent TV work includes Remember Me, Trollied, Father Brown, three series as Tony in BBC's Millie In Between, Crazyhead, Doc Martin, Shakespeare and Hathaway. In 2020, he played General Percival in ITV's WW2 drama The Singapore Grip filmed in Malaysia, and in 2021, Taylor Lawson in series 25 of Silent Witness.

=== Film ===
Lumsden played Robert Ferrars in Ang Lee's Sense and Sensibility. He also appeared in The Avengers, Room To Rent, Silent Cry, Gospel of John, City Slacker, Morris A Life With Bells On (for which he also composed the music) and Ben Wheatley's Sightseers.

In 2014, Lumsden starred in the independent British feature film Downhill, directed by James Rouse, a comedy about four friends attempting Alfred Wainwright's Coast to Coast Walk. He played Ballested in Jan Vardoen's Heart Of Lightness, shot in Norway's Arctic Circle, and General Ismay in Joe Wright's Darkest Hour (2016).

Most recently Lumsden starred as Paul in Brook Driver & Finn Bruce's debut feature film Swede Caroline, alongside Jo Hartley & Celyn Jones, released on 19 April 2024.

=== Theatre ===
Notable theatre work includes: White Teeth (Kiln, 2018), It's All Made Up (Royal Court, 2017), Cartwright (Telegin) in Chekhov's Uncle Vanya for director Robert Icke (also providing the on-stage musical accompaniment, 2016).^{,} and Mr Webb in David Cromer's internationally celebrated production of Our Town (2014), both at the Almeida in London.

He performed his own one–man musical play We Could Be Heroes at the Bridewell Theatre, 2004, later transferring to the Mill Theatre, Yvonne Arnaud in Guildford and the Arts Theatre, West End. His repertory theatre work at Stoke-on-Trent and Basingstoke includes the title roles in Hamlet and Master Harold & The Boys, and productions of As You Like It, King Lear, A Trip To Scarborough, Amadeus, Juno and the Paycock, Far From The Madding Crowd and Having A Ball. He played Roche in Rat in the Skull at Theater Exchange, Minneapolis USA, and John Thorpe in Northanger Abbey at Greenwich.

=== Writing ===
His writing work includes a seven-hour drama Wonderful You for ITV (co-written with Chris Niel), in which he also starred, a one-man musical We Can Be Heroes which he performed in London, and five verse plays for BBC Radio 4: John Dodd Gets Taken for a Ride (shortlisted for the BBC / Society of Authors' Imison award for new writing), A Good Place For Fishing which starred Anne Reid, and Man in the Moon, with Tom Courtenay (shortlisted for the BBC/ Society of Authors' Tinniswood award) and A Book By Lester Tricklebank (with Stephen Tompkinson). Readings of his play Skeletons have taken place at Soho Theatre and Leicester Square Theatre.

His debut novel The Six Loves of Billy Binns, was published by Tinder Press in January 2019. He had previously adapted his story for Radio 4 under the same title, starring Tom Courtenay, which was broadcast in 2010.

=== Music ===
Lumsden plays a number of instruments including piano, guitars, bass, banjo, ukulele etc., and has composed music for cinema, television & theatre, including the orchestral & folk soundtrack to the 2009 film Morris: A Life with Bells On, a full musical score for Alice in Wonderland at the New Vic Theatre in Stoke, title music for BBC's The Morning Show, and incidental music for numerous TV dramas and theatre productions. He has played many UK gigs with his band Henry Kissing Her, releasing two albums; A Little of Who You Fancy (1996) & Pull (2006). He also released a CD of piano music, Concert From The Eyrie (2001). In 2012, Lumsden and fiddle virtuoso John Dipper released the folk album Sunshine Takes You. Lumsden released his 'final' album of songs, The Unhurt in 2020.

== Background ==
Lumsden attended Lady Manners School, situated in Bakewell in the Peak District, before he trained at the Guildford School of Acting, graduating in 1986. In 1995, Lumsden married actress Sophie Thompson; they separated in 2015 and have two sons.

== Selected filmography ==
=== Television ===
| Year | Title | Role | Notes |
|---|---|---|---|
| 1988 – 1989 | First of the Summer Wine | Foggy Dewhurst | 13 episodes |
| 1991 | The Brittas Empire | Groom | Episode: "Underwater Wedding" |
| 1991 | The Sharp End | Nutter | 4 episodes |
| 1991 | Waterfront Beat | Pitcher | 2 episodes |
| 1993 | Grace & Favour | Sergeant | Episode: "The Gun" |
| 1994 | Nelson's Column | Tony | Episode: "Out on a Limb" |
| 1995 | Coogan's Run | Alun Crown | Episode: "Dearth of a Salesman" |
| 1995 | One Foot in the Grave | Nurse | Episode: "The Affair of the Hollow Lady" |
| 1995 – 1998 | Is It Legal? | Colin Lotus | 21 episodes |
| 1997 | Chalk | Ronald Langland | Episode: "The New Student" |
| 1998 | Hornblower | Midshipman Hether | Episode: "The Even Chance" |
| 1999 | Dangerfield | Darren Sullivan | Episode: "Tying the Knot" |
| 1999 | Wonderful You | Henry | 7 episodes |
| 2001 | Attila | Petronius Maximus | 2 episodes |
| 2001 | People Like Us | Paul | Episode: "The Mother" |
| 2002 | The House That Jack Built | Roger Squire | 6 episodes |
| 2004 | All About Me | Charles | 8 episodes |
| 2004 | Hardware | Cliff Hicks | Episode: "Loser" |
| 2004 – 2009 | The Catherine Tate Show | Martin / Bob Cratchit / Ray | 6 episodes |
| 2005 | Love Soup | Stephen | Episode: "War is Heck" |
| 2005 – 2006 | Sugar Rush | Nathan Daniels | 20 episodes |
| 2007 | Party Animals | Nigel | 2 episodes |
| 2007 | Suburban Shootout | Toby Jerwood-Jones | Episode: "In It for the Wild Life/Fight Club" |
| 2008 | Dis/Connected | Josh's Dad | TV Movie |
| 2008 | Eastenders | Arnold | 3 episodes |
| 2009 | Garrow's Law | Surgeon Tomkins | 1 episode |
| 2009 | Grownups | Doctor | Episode: "Balls" |
| 2009 | Free Agents | Rick | 1 episode |
| 2009 | U Be Dead | DI Stephen Thorpe | TV Movie |
| 2010 – 2011 | Summer in Transylvania | Mike Farley | 4 episodes |
| 2011 | Life of Riley | Roger Weaver | 11 episodes |
| 2012 | Little Crackers | Dad | Episode: "Rebecca Front's Little Cracker" |
| 2012 | Vexed | Jeff | 1 episode |
| 2013 | All at Sea | Mr. King | Episode: "Bee Boy" |
| 2013 | By Any Means | Raymond Nash | 1 episode |
| 2013 | Midsomer Murders | David Farmer | Episode: "The Sicilian Defence" |
| 2014 | Remember Me | Jeff Harding | 1 episode |
| 2014 | Trollied | Dr. Phillip | 1 episode |
| 2015 – 2018 | Millie Inbetween | Tony McDonald | 29 episodes |
| 2016 | Crazyhead | Doctor Jones | Episode: "A Very Trippy Horse" |
| 2016 | Father Brown | Peter Blackstone | Episode: "The Resurrectionists" |
| 2017 | Doc Martin | Graham Hendy | Episode: "Blade on a Feather" |
| 2018 | Shakespeare and Hathaway | Peter Quintus | Episode: "The Promised End" |
| 2020 | Doctors | Alex Dowling | Episode: "Unspoken" |
| 2020 | The Singapore Grip | General Percival | 4 episodes |
| 2021 | Silent Witness | Dr Taylor Lawson | Episode: "Redemption" |

=== Film ===
| Year | Title | Role | Notes |
|---|---|---|---|
| 1995 | Sense and Sensibility | Robert Ferrars | |
| 1998 | The Avengers | Boodle's Porter | |
| 2000 | Room to Rent | Sam | |
| 2002 | Silent Cry | Tim Cox | |
| 2003 | The Gospel of John | Baptist's Disciple #2 | |
| 2009 | Morris: A Life with Bells On | Plush Gurney | |
| 2012 | City Slacker | Simon | |
| 2012 | Sightseers | Rambler | |
| 2014 | Downhill | Gordon | |
| 2014 | Heart of Lightness | Ballested | |
| 2017 | Darkest Hour | General Ismay | |
| 2024 | Swede Caroline | Paul | |
