= Here Comes the Queen =

Unbroadcast TV sitcom

- Genre: Sitcom
- Written by: Jeremy Lloyd; David Croft
- Directed by: Roy Gould
- Starring: Les Dennis; Wendy Richard
- Country of origin: United Kingdom
- Original language: English
- No. of episodes: 1 (unbroadcast pilot)

Production
- Producers: David Croft; Penny Croft
- Production location: Bury St Edmunds
- Production company: Worldwide Theatrix

Here Comes the Queen is a British sitcom pilot that was written by Jeremy Lloyd and David Croft. It starred Les Dennis and Wendy Richard. A single pilot episode was produced, but was never broadcast.

== Synopsis ==
Dennis and Richard play a brother and sister who discover they are heirs to the throne of a small (fictitious) country in the former Soviet Union.

== Cast ==
- Les Dennis as Percy Wills
- Wendy Richard as Lillian Wills
- Philip Madoc as Karminsky
- Burt Kwouk as Mr Chan
- Janie Dee as British Agent
- Mark Dexter as British Agent
- Natasha Radski as Magda
- Ian Lavender
- Niky Wardley

== Production ==
=== Development and filming ===
Speaking to the Daily Mirror in April 2007, Wendy Richard recalled how she had contacted writer David Croft following her departure from EastEnders, where she had played Pauline Fowler for more than twenty years, about whether there was a new vehicle she could become involved in. 'I phoned David last year and said: "I've resigned from EastEnders, so if you fancy getting your writing hat on again..." Within weeks, David Croft and his writing partner, Jeremy Lloyd, had written the script for Here Comes the Queen and sent it to Richard.

Richard was optimistic for the series, saying that, 'It will be great working with Ian again, too, and Les is a bloody good actor. I'm just so excited – it is going to be brilliant.' She also revealed that her character, Lillian Wills, 'won't be glamorous because she is a lady of a certain age but she will be smart. She is Miss Brahms a few years down the line.'

The pilot was filmed in 2007, and was produced by Worldwide Theatrix, a production company owned by David Croft and his daughter, Penny Croft. Filming was completed in Bury St Edmunds, where Worldwide Theatrix is based.

== Release ==
The pilot was screened to audiences at MIPCOM in Cannes from 8–13 October 2007.

A DVD of the pilot was scheduled to be released soon after the publication of Bill Pertwee's Dad's Army book in 2009. However, since the pilot was never broadcast on television, the DVD was never produced.
