= Michael Bilton =

British actor (1919–1993)

- Born: Robert Michael Bilton; 14 December 1919; Cottingham, East Riding of Yorkshire, England
- Died: 5 November 1993 (aged 73); Berkhamsted, Hertfordshire, England
- Occupation: Actor
- Years active: 1952 – 1993

Robert Michael Bilton (14 December 1919 – 5 November 1993) was an English actor best known for his roles in the British television sitcoms To the Manor Born (playing the gardener and sometime butler Ned) and Waiting for God (playing Basil, a octogenarian satyr).

== Early life ==
He attended Hymers College, Hull. In the Second World War, he was commissioned as a Second Lieutenant and was wounded at the Battle of El Alamein. After his recovery he began his acting career in repertory theatre.

== Career ==
He had a strong comedic bent and featured in Keeping Up Appearances, One Foot in the Grave and Grace and Favour (1992). He also appeared in Brideshead Revisited, Pennies From Heaven, The Saint, The Avengers, The Prisoner, Quatermass II, The Champions, the doorman at a hotel in Terry and June, in the Doctor Who stories, The Massacre of St Bartholomew's Eve, Pyramids of Mars, Wodehouse Playhouse, (as Malay, the Butler), Dad's Army (as Mr Maxwell, the solicitor), "The Adventure of Shoscombe Olde Place" episode of The Case-Book of Sherlock Holmes; (also notable in the cast was Jude Law as an aspiring jockey). Bilton's film appearances included A Taste of Honey (1961), The Thirty Nine Steps (1978) and The Fourth Protocol (1987), as Kim Philby.

Bilton appeared in a well-remembered Yellow Pages television commercial as an elderly gardener receiving a sit-on lawnmower from a couple with a large rear garden. The male half of the couple was played by David Hargreaves, who also appeared in the BBC drama series Juliet Bravo.

In later years, crippling arthritis prevented him from working in the theatre. His last London West End appearance, in the early 1980s, was alongside Penelope Keith in Hobson's Choice at the Theatre Royal Haymarket.

Bilton's final role was that of Basil Makepeace in the BBC sitcom Waiting for God. His final appearance was in the last episode of the fourth series. He died shortly after completing filming. In the 1993 Christmas episode, his absence was explained by his character having gone on an "Icelandic wife-swapping cruise" and he is not mentioned again. The character of Basil was essentially "replaced" by Jamie Edwards, Jane's spirited Irish grandfather, who was played by Paddy Ward.

== Personal life and death ==
Bilton was married and divorced twice, first to Sally West from 1944 and later to actress Valerie Newbold, from 1953 until 1967.

Bilton died aged 73, on 5 November 1993 in Berkhamsted, Hertfordshire.

== Filmography ==
Year	Title	Role	Notes
1933	Crime on the Hill	Youth With Straw Boater	Uncredited
1952	Sing Along with Me		
1961	A Taste of Honey	Landlord	
1965	The Early Bird	Nervous Man	
1966	Arabesque	Camera Shop Owner	Uncredited
1966	Press for Time	Councilor Hedge	
1972	Frenzy	Blaney Trial Jury Foreman	Uncredited
1977	Full Circle	Salesman	
1978	The Thirty Nine Steps	Vicar	
1979–1981	To the Manor Born	Ned	
1981	Brideshead Revisited	Hayter	
1987	The Fourth Protocol	Kim Philby	
1989	First of the Summer Wine	Customer	Episode: "Compo Drops In"
1990	The New Statesman	Sir William Horsey QC	Episode: "Who Shot Alan B'Stard?"
1992-1993	Grace & Favour	Mr Thorpe	
1990–1993	Waiting for God	Basil Makepeace	27 episodes, (final appearance)
