= Natasha Radski =

British actress

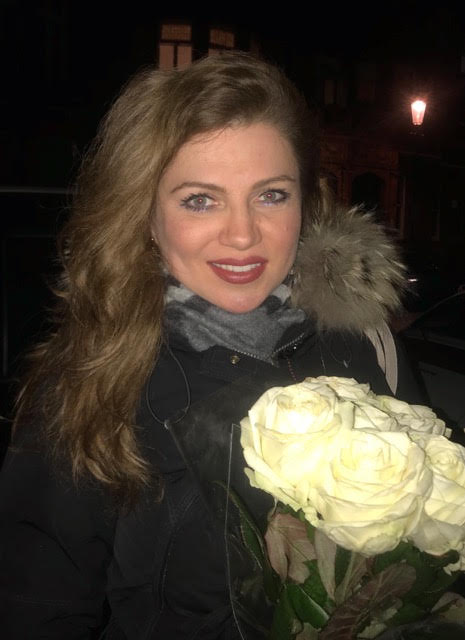
- Radski in London in 2018
- Education: Drama Studio London
- Website: www.natasharadski.com

Natasha Radski is a British actress.

== Career ==
Radski has played lead roles in theatre productions including Antigone in the tragedy Antigone by Jean Anouilh, Yvonne in My Wife's Dead Mother by Georges Feydeau, Lucile in Love and the Piano by Georges Feydeau, Lidia Astafieva in The House with a View in the Field. by Alexander Vampilov.

Natasha Radski got her first TV role in David Croft's sitcom Here Comes the Queen, 2007. She has played Mrs. Kominski, a guest appearance in Citizen Khan BBC series, 2016, and has worked in a guest role of the Eastern-European character Daga opposite British comedian Jo Brand in Damned Channel 4 series, 2018, produced by Lionsgate and What Larks! Productions. She has appeared in a tragic role in Dracula (2020 TV series) for BBC/Netflix.

She has played the role of Russian News Reader in HBO / Sky Atlantic Chernobyl.

Natasha has played a distressed immigrant Irina in "Café Mirage", 2020, directed by Neilson Black, and the nosy Eastern-European neighbour Anna in British-Indian comedy "Little English", 2022.

Radski has worked for BBC Radio 4 drama and played the variety of characters. She was a sole reader of the comedy Woman of Your Dreams, played a title role, Chechen terrorist Yara in Forty-Three Fifty-Nine: Yara, Russian trafficked girl Anya in Ariel, Ukrainian nuclear scientist Tanya Moroz in The King of Pripyat, and Polish immigrant Magda who had to make difficult life choices in Dreaming in English. She was also a supporting character Edita, a Croatian friend in Josh Howie's Losing It.

She has voiced the BAFTA award-winning computer game Half-Life 2 (Russian version) and Sniper Elite 5. Radski has also played Lena Korolev in "Doctor Who, Singularity", an audio drama produced by Big Finish Productions.

== Filmography ==
Year	Title	Role	Notes
2007	Here Comes the Queen	Magda	Pilot episode
2011	Rev	Caretaker	Comedy series
2015	The Royals	Garden Party Guest	Comedy
2016	Citizen Khan	Mrs. Kominski	Episode: "Cricket"
2018	Damned	Daga	Episode 2.3
2019	Chernobyl	Russian News Reader	Episode: "Please Remain Calm"
2019	Waiting	Nina	Episode: "Dungeon"
2019	Dracula	Mother	Episode: Blood Vessel"
2020	The Duchess	Midwife	Episode 1.6
2020	Café Mirage	Irina	Comedy
2022	Little English	Anna	Comedy

== Video games ==
Year	Title	Role	Notes
2004	Half-Life 2	HEV Suit / Overwatch (Voice)	(Russian Version)
2022	Sniper Elite 5	Monika (Voice)	
