= Fleur Bennett =

British actress

- Born: 18 June 1968 (age 58); St Ives, Cornwall, England
- Education: Guildhall School of Music and Drama
- Occupation: Actress
- Television: Grace & Favour; Family Affairs

Fleur Alison Bennett (born 18 June 1968) is a British television actress best known for her work on the sitcom Grace & Favour (a spinoff of Are You Being Served?) and the Channel 5 soap opera Family Affairs.

== Life and career ==
Bennett was born in St Ives in Cornwall, England on 18 June 1968. She was educated at Mountview Theatre School and Guildhall School of Music and Drama in London.

Bennett debuted in the Are You Being Served? spin-off Grace & Favour (1992–1993), in which she played the part of Mavis Moulterd. After the show ended, she had small appearances on Nelson's Column (1994) and Cracker (1995).

In 1997, she played Laura Forester in the mini-series The Rag Nymph. Between 1997 and 1999, she played Belinda Rhodes in the TV-series Family Affairs. She also made a guest appearance in Heartbeat in 1998. Her television career in later years consisted mainly of guest appearances in Midsomer Murders (2001), Casualty (2002) and Down to Earth (2005).

== Television roles ==
Year	Title	Role	Notes
1992–93	Grace & Favour	Mavis Moulterd	12 episodes
1994	Nelson's Column	Melanie	Episode: "Back to Basics"
1995	Cracker	Nena	Episode: "True Romance" (Parts 1 & 2)
1996	The Bill	Vicky Jackson	Episode: "Cold Feet and Hot Coffee"
1997–99	Family Affairs	Belinda Rhodes	Series regular
1997	The Rag Nymph	Laura Forester	Mini-series
1998	Heartbeat	Kirsty Williams	Episode: "Forbidden Fruit"
2001	Midsomer Murders	Debbie Shortlands	Episode: "Dark Autumn"
2002	Casualty	Vicky	Episode: "Denial"
2005	Down to Earth	Liz Sullivan	Episode: "Cowboys"
2006	The 12 Inch Pianist	Villager	Short film
2008	Zip and Hollow	Claire	Television film
