= List of George and Mildred episodes =

This is a list of episodes of ITV sitcom George and Mildred.

== Series overview ==
Series	Episodes	Originally released	
Series	Episodes	First released	Last released
1	10	6 September 1976	8 November 1976
2	7	14 November 1977	26 December 1977
3	6	31 August 1978	5 October 1978
4	7	9 November 1978	27 December 1978
5	8	24 October 1979	25 December 1979

== Episodes ==
=== Series 1 (1976) ===
No. overall	No. in series	Title	Original release date
1	1	"Moving On"	6 September 1976
Having to move, George and Mildred view a property in Hampton Wick on "a small rather exclusive development". They are shown around by the snobbish estate agent Jeffrey Fourmile, who could also be their new neighbour, if Mildred has her way. Fourmile denies he is a snob. When George and Mildred go to see the house a second time, they discover it has been sold. However, Fourmile had pretended it had been sold in an unsuccessful attempt to prevent the Ropers from moving in.
2	2	"The Bad Penny"	13 September 1976
George and Mildred move into their new home. They are invited for a welcoming drink by the Fourmiles, but Jeffrey does not want them around by the time the Fourmiles' dinner guests arrive — the local Conservative MP (played by Diana King), and her husband. However, the Ropers accidentally lock themselves out of their house and are still at the Fourmiles' when the guests arrive, and George is outspoken about his allegiance to Labour and opposition to the Conservatives.
3	3	"And Women Must Weep"	20 September 1976
George applies for a position as a filing clerk at Jeffrey Fourmile's estate agency. Fourmile prefers Mildred, and gives her the job instead. George tells Mildred to quit her job and that he starts work as a night watchman that night.
4	4	"Baby Talk"	27 September 1976
Mildred is asked to babysit Tristram. The middle class Fourmiles are going out to see Tom Stoppard's play Jumpers. Mildred enjoys babysitting, so she and George try to adopt a child themselves. They are rejected, so George buys a female Yorkshire Terrier, whom Mildred names Truffles. Anthony Sharp appears in this episode, and Truffles, for the first time.
5	5	"Your Money or Your Life"	4 October 1976
George and Mildred attend his uncle's funeral. Mildred wants George to get life insurance. She asks a funeral director how much an average, run-of-the-mill funeral will cost. George is not happy when he realises that he is worth more dead than alive and he refuses to take out the insurance. Michael Ripper, Stella Moray, Arthur Howard and John Carlin appear in this episode.
6	6	"Where My Caravan Has Rested"	11 October 1976
George trades in his broken-down car, a Reliant Regal, for a broken-down caravan. The local residents' association are keen to get rid of the eyesore and buy it off him. Mildred's sister Ethel and her husband Humphrey visit from Oxshott. They have had electronic gates fitted to their drive that open to the sound of Ethel's voice. Mildred shows off her lava lamp in this episode, a very popular item of home decoration in 1970s Britain which annoys Humphrey. Early next morning Fourmile sends the caravan to the scrapyard to be crushed, not knowing that George is sleeping inside it. George wakes up and gets out of the caravan at the scrapyard, before it is crushed there.
7	7	"The Little Dog Laughed"	18 October 1976
George is unhappy about Truffles seeming to get better treatment from Mildred than he does. He takes Truffles to the pub with him, leaves her outside, and she wanders off. Tristram wants a dog, but Fourmile does not, so he buys Tristram a toy dog. Fourmile finds Truffles and returns him to Mildred. George buys a Yorkshire Terrier and pretends that it is Truffles, however, Mildred realises that it is not Truffles, due to being male. Mildred gives the new dog to Tristram, just before Fourmile arrives home with a Dalmatian. Paul Angelis appears in this episode.
8	8	"Best Foot Forward"	25 October 1976
George and Mildred visit the posh local pub The Genevieve. When the Ropers' television goes wrong, George takes Fourmile's ladder - without asking him - to climb up to the aerial to fix it. Fourmile takes the ladder away, not knowing George to be on the roof. George falls off the roof, sprains his wrist and breaks his leg. In hospital, a fellow patient (played by Kenneth Watson), tells George that he can sue Fourmile for the injury.
9	9	"My Husband Next Door"	1 November 1976
After 20 years, the Ropers' TV set has finally perished and has to be carted away. It is bad news for George, who had a whole "itininerary" of viewing planned for his week off, as opposed to redecorating the lounge. With the Fourmiles going on holiday, Ann offers Mildred the use of their set. When George hears this he ends up spending much of his time next door. This causes a huge problem when the decorators Mildred has hired come calling. The decorators mistakenly strip the wallpaper off in the Fourmiles' house. George puts up the same type of wallpaper to replace it, but does the job badly. Tristram notices that it is upside down — then a roll of it peels off the wall onto Fourmile.
10	10	"Family Planning"	8 November 1976
Ethel arrives in her "new bottle green automatic Jaguar XJ6", to talk to Mildred about their mother who is becoming too old to be left on her own. George does not want her to live with them, Ethel and Humphrey are planning to convert their spare room into "a billiard room and sauna bath", and third sister Hilda has five (soon to be six) children. A family conference is called to decide the issue of who should look after her. Mildred's mother shows George a letter from her son Arthur in New Zealand, inviting her to live with him on his farm. George plans to invite her to move in with him, in order to gain Mildred's favour and to make the rest of her family look selfish, with the intent of sending her to live with Arthur soon afterwards. Humphrey and Mildred tell George that her living with Arthur would have been better, but he died in 1950. Tristram gets a black eye from a girl at school, so Jeffrey teaches him boxing.

=== Series 2 (1977) ===
No. overall	No. in series	Title	Original release date
11	1	"Jumble Pie"	14 November 1977
George is bereaved when Oscar, his budgerigar, dies. Mildred offers to help out at a jumble sale at the church so Reverend Stopes (Trevor Baxter), calls to collect items for sale. Amongst other things, Mildred donates a box of George's old gardening magazines because he never does any gardening. However, she is mortified when George tells her that the box of magazines only had gardening magazines on the top and the rest are pornographic. At the jumble sale, George asks Fourmile to have back the box of gardening magazines. Fourmile gives him a box containing only gardening magazines. George takes the box of magazines home, believing that it contains all the magazines of his that Mildred donated. George asks Fourmile what he did with the other magazines of his; Fourmile claims that he incinerated them. Ann finds them undamaged and is angry with Fourmile for bringing them home, so he gives them to George.
12	2	"All Around the Clock"	21 November 1977
On the Ropers' 24th wedding anniversary, Mildred gives George a pipe and tobacco. George gives her a carriage clock, which he bought for £10 from a man in the pub. Jeffrey, Ann and Tristram arrive back from a golfing holiday to find they have been burgled. When the Fourmiles tell Mildred that one of the missing items is a carriage clock, she suspects that it is the same one that George gave her. The burglars are caught and all the Fourmiles' possessions are recovered. Robert Gillespie and Richard Coleman appear in this episode.
13	3	"The Travelling Man"	28 November 1977
George thinks he and Mildred could improve their finances by taking in a lodger. Mildred is initially opposed to the idea. She changes her mind when Edward Rogers (Derek Waring), a charming sales representative, knocks at their door looking to rent a room. The couple welcome him: George because of how much Mr Rogers is willing to pay, and Mildred because she is sexually attracted to him. George becomes suspicious and jealous when he realises that Mildred is attracted to Mr Rogers. She is disappointed when, after a month living there, Mr Rogers tells her that he is moving with his job and more so when he tells her that he is gay. At the pub, she sees Mr Rogers with a young woman, him telling her that he falsely claimed to Mildred that he is gay in order to deflect her advances. Tristram wants a skateboard, which his father disapproves of as the latest 'fad'. He buys Tristram a skateboard, but before he gives it to him, he stops wanting one and wants a Star Wars robot instead. Harry Littlewood appears in this episode.
14	4	"The Unkindest Cut of All"	5 December 1977
Mildred's sister Ethel and her husband Humphrey are coming to dinner, so Mildred wants to cook poulet rôti. The Ropers' electricity supply is cut off because George failed to pay the bill. With the Fourmiles visiting his mother — and Ann having given Mildred a house key — George runs an extension lead from their electricity socket into his house. When they return, Fourmile pulls the lead, moving the Ropers' lamp. He then disconnects it, leaving the Ropers and their guests in the dark — and the dinner half-cooked. Humphrey decides to phone a hotel to book a table for dinner there. However, the phone does not work because it has been cut off due to George not having paid the phone bill. Norman Mitchell appears in this episode.
15	5	"The Right Way to Travel"	12 December 1977
Mildred wants to go to Mallorca on holiday, but George wants to go back to Blackpool like they usually do. He tries to talk Mildred out of going by pointing out that neither of them can speak Spanish. What is worse for George is that Mildred wants them to travel with the Conservative Association to obtain a 40% discount. Labour supporter George is not happy with that idea either. The Ropers attend a meeting with the club, at which they accept him, despite his awful answers to their questions about his political views and Fourmile's objections to him. Fourmile falsely claims that the trip is fully booked, so George refuses to join. George is unable to book a hotel in Blackpool because the hotels there are full due to Labour holding their conference there.
16	6	"The Dorothy Letters"	19 December 1977
While Mildred is cleaning, she finds an old case which contains many love letters written by George to somebody called Dorothy. He refuses to tell her who Dorothy is, so she takes George off for some relationship counselling. At the session, Mildred tells the counsellor about the letters, but he refuses to talk about them. At home, he admits to Mildred that they were written to Dorothy Lamour and that he never sent any of them. Since the world is overpopulated, and he does not want any more children, Fourmile considers having a vasectomy. Ann is disappointed because she wants another child. James Cosmo appears in this episode.
17	7	"No Business Like Show Business"	26 December 1977
Jeffrey Fourmile is producing and directing the Hampton Wick Players' Christmas pantomime, Cinderella. A problem arises however, which leaves the production short of a second ugly sister. Mildred, who has been eager to take part in the play, is offered the role. She accepts, despite being cast in a role that is usually played by men. Ethel and Humphrey arrive for the evening of the performance, but by then, Mildred has fallen ill and lost her voice, leaving George to take her place. However, the taxi taking him there crashes into Ethel and Humphrey's car, so Fourmile plays the role instead. Roy Barraclough, playing an ugly sister, Sue Bond, and Derek Deadman also appear in this episode.

=== Series 3 (1978) ===
No. overall	No. in series	Title	Original release date
18	1	"Opportunity Knocks"	31 August 1978
Mildred invites people to her coffee morning, but the only guest who arrives is Ann, who is heavily pregnant. Jerry tells George about a scheme to poach pigeons from Trafalgar Square to create a 'pigeon farm'. They would breed them, kill them, fry them and sell them in a chain of shops. George has very little money, so he thinks it a good idea to sell the house to raise the capital to back it. He goes to Fourmile to ask him to put the house on the market, which he gleefully does without charging any commission. Mildred is angry when she finds out from Ann that George tried to sell it, so it is taken off the market. Jerry tells George that he has another scheme — selling newts. Patricia Kneale and Robert Raglan appear in this episode.
19	2	"And so to Bed"	7 September 1978
After their bed breaks when George sits on it, Mildred is determined that they buy a new one. However, their attempt to buy one in a shop fails because they do not have enough money and George is on a hire purchase blacklist. George bets on a horse race accumulator and wins, but when he comes to collect his winnings the bookmaker only gives him 85 pence, after deducting the money owed by George from previous losing bets. Jimmy Thompson, John Lyons and Harry Littlewood appear in this episode.
20	3	"I Believe in Yesterday"	14 September 1978
Mildred receives a letter from an American, Lee Kennedy, with whom she had a fling during WW2 when he was a flight sergeant. She accepts his invitation to have dinner with him at the Dorchester Hotel. She is pleased to see him, but is soon disappointed when he tells her that he has also invited 18 other women, who soon arrive. George phones Gloria Rumbold, with whom he had a five-year nonsexual relationship when she was young, slim and soft-spoken. He arranges to meet her in the pub. However, he leaves before meeting her when he sees that she is now a plump, outspoken, middle-aged woman who works in a massage parlour. Lionel Murton, George Malpas and Claire Davenport appear in this episode.
21	4	"The Four Letter Word"	21 September 1978
Mildred's brother-in-law Humphrey offers George a job, but the notoriously lazy George does not want it, despite Mildred's insistence. After learning that Humphrey is planning a weekend away in Jersey with his attractive young secretary Maggie, George tells Humphrey that he will not tell Ethel about his trip if he claims that there is no job at his firm for him. When Ethel finds the tickets for Jersey in Humphrey's jacket pocket, he claims that they are a present for George and Mildred and she gives the tickets to them. When George reveals that Humphrey's plan was to take his secretary, Humphrey rips up the tickets. George takes a job from Fourmile — advertising his company by walking along the street wearing a sandwich board. Jennifer Guy appears in this episode.
22	5	"The Delivery Man"	28 September 1978
Ann goes into labour whilst Jeffrey is away at work in Birmingham. George takes her to the hospital in his sidecar. At the hospital, the staff wrongly assume that George is her husband — and he faints whilst watching the birth. Gail Lidstone, Cass Allen, Michael Redfern and Paul Meier appear in this episode.
23	6	"Life with Father"	5 October 1978
George's father moves into an old folks' home, then turns up at George and Mildred's house after claiming that he was thrown out of the home. Mildred phones the home's manager, who tells him that he was not evicted — he left because they would not allow him to keep his ferret there. At the house, it escapes. Fourmile accidentally kills it by running over it, then gives them a live one to replace it. Reg Lye, Beatrix Mackey, and Tim Barrett appear in this episode.

=== Series 4 (1978) ===
No. overall	No. in series	Title	Original release date
24	1	"Just the Job"	9 November 1978
George is called to a job interview — the position vacant is that of traffic warden. George has no love for the "little Hitlers" as he sees them, but takes the job. George (reluctantly) and Mildred (happily) agree to attend Tristram's school prize giving. George tickets several cars outside the school, including Fourmile's.
25	2	"Days of Beer and Rosie"	16 November 1978
A 33-year-old man, Bill, approaches George in the pub and tells him that he is his son, conceived on VE Night in 1945 when Bill believes that George had a one-night stand with Bill's mother, Rosie — who died recently. George was drunk on the night in question and cannot remember if he had sex with Rosie. He is disappointed when he finds out that an acquaintance of his, Ernest, who was there with another woman, is the real father. Jeremy Bulloch and Tony Melody appear in this episode.
26	3	"You Must Have Showers"	23 November 1978
Mildred wants to have a shower installed in the bathroom, but she and George cannot afford anyone other than Jerry (Roy Kinnear), who will install it for a small fraction of the price charged by the others. Jerry smashes through the wall to the Fourmiles' bathroom whilst Fourmile is in the bath. When Jerry repairs the damage, he makes a mistake with the water pipes, meaning that the Ropers' controls operate the Fourmiles' shower and vice versa.
27	4	"All Work and No Pay"	30 November 1978
George resigns from his job as a traffic warden, but tries to figure a way of avoiding Mildred discovering it, as he does not want to incur her wrath. She finds out, and manages to persuade his manager to take him back, but George is reluctant to return. George allows Jerry to store 40 bags of cement in the Ropers' garage. Mildred is horrified, because she has told Fourmile that he may use it to store his second car. Fourmile drives it into the garage, expecting it to be empty - and drives into the cement. Blake Butler appears in this episode.
28	5	"Nappy Days"	7 December 1978
Jeffrey, Ann and Tristram Fourmile are attending a funeral, so they ask the Ropers to look after baby Tarquin for the day. Mildred is pleased, but George thinks it an imposition. When Mildred goes out, George is left in sole charge of Tarquin. The Fourmiles' car breaks down on their journey home and as a result they are delayed for a few hours. George takes Tarquin in his pram to a British Legion darts match. When George returns home, he realises that he left Tarquin at the pub. He retrieves Tarquin and hands him over to the Fourmiles, but Mildred is angry when she finds out. Norman Mitchell and Billy Burden appear in this episode.
29	6	"The Mating Game"	14 December 1978
Mildred wants Truffles, George and Mildred's Yorkshire terrier, to have puppies. George is happy with that, since he thinks there might be money in it. They decide to pair Truffles with Ethel's Yorkie, Pomeroy. Truffles has four puppies, but they were clearly sired by another dog. George's two goldfish produce offspring.
30	7	"On the Second Day of Christmas"	27 December 1978
George and Mildred reflect on their uneventful Christmas — even Mildred's mother, (Gretchen Franklin), has a more exciting time. Ann invites them over for a post-Christmas drink and George loses a lot of money to Jeffrey playing a game of pong. Ethel and Humphrey arrive. NOTE - George reads the date in the TV Times as Wednesday 27 December. However, the title claims it’s the "Second Day of Christmas", which would make it Boxing Day (the First Day of Christmas being Christmas Day).

=== Series 5 (1979) ===
No. overall	No. in series	Title	Original release date
31	1	"Finders Keepers?"	24 October 1979
Fourmile is annoyed at bindweed from the Ropers' garden growing into their garden. Tristram has made friends with Tommy, a boy from the local council estate. This displeases Fourmile who thinks that their sort should have a separate playground and is annoyed at Tristram speaking in a downmarket way recently. Tommy's shop steward father visits, telling Fourmile that he does not want his son to be friends with Tristram, because Tommy has been speaking in an upmarket way since knowing him. George finds a credit card. When he buys Mildred a fur coat from Oxfam as an anniversary present, she assumes that he paid with the card. The card's owner comes to the house, pleased that George handed the card in to the police. Mildred finds out from Oxfam that George paid for the coat with cash. She finds out from George that he stole the money for it from her. Trevor Baxter, Roy Herrick, Ivor Roberts and Hal Dyer appear in this episode. This episode aired on the first night ITV returned after the 1979 ITV strike, which saw the entire ITV network (apart from the Channel Islands region) off air from 10 August until 24 October 1979. This episode was planned to air earlier in the autumn schedules, but the strike delayed its transmission.
32	2	"In Sickness and in Health"	30 October 1979
Mildred goes into hospital for suspected appendicitis. Jerry's landlord has ejected him for non-payment of rent, so he invites himself to stay at the Ropers', along with his 'niece' Gloria. When Mildred returns because she merely had indigestion, she angrily throws Jerry and Gloria out. Tristram erects a tent to camp overnight in his garden. Soon after, he finds Jerry and Gloria in it. Sue Bond, Nina Baden-Semper, Aimée Delamain and Royston Tickner appear in this episode.
33	3	"The Last Straw"	6 November 1979
Mildred is disenchanted by her failure to be included in the social life on her middle class estate. She and George return to George's old council estate, with an eye to moving back, and visit his old neighbours Alf and Gladys (Michael Robbins and Queenie Watts), but they find the terraced streets are gone, replaced by modern tower blocks. Mildred wants to move to Australia. Fourmile is delighted at the prospect of George moving to the other side of the world. She and George go to Australia House to see if they can move there. They are rejected due to having nothing to offer Australia. Back in Hampton Wick, Mildred's spirits rise when she is invited reluctantly by Fourmile to join a local committee and a campaign to save a Victorian lamp post. However, George crashes his motorcycle into the lamp post, knocking it down.
34	4	"A Driving Ambition"	13 November 1979
Mildred leaves the house, saying that she is attending her twice-weekly keep-fit class with Ann. Mildred is actually having driving lessons, which she has kept secret due to not wanting George to teach her himself. When George says to Ann that he is surprised that she is not at the class, she tells him that the classes have stopped. When he sees Mildred in a car with a man, he suspects that she is having an affair. Mildred, Fourmile and Ann are amused at George's suspicion. Mildred decides to let him continue believing that, so that he pays more attention to her than usual. The driving instructor comes to the house and George questions him, leading to George finding out the truth. Robert Raglan and Harry Fowler appear in this episode.
35	5	"A Military Pickle"	27 November 1979
George's brother Charlie (Peter Birrel) visits, and brings a letter addressed to G Roper that arrived in 1949, just after George had left home. The letter contains call-up papers which George and Mildred assume are for him. When they tell the Army, they inform him that the deserter is George's sister, Gloria. An acquaintance of Fourmile's sells a stolen second-hand car to Mildred. David Neville, Michael Maynard, Richard Shaw and Harry Littlewood appear in this episode.
36	6	"Fishy Business"	4 December 1979
Mildred accidentally flushes George's pet goldfish, Moby, down the drain. After George searches the pipes under the garden for his beloved fish, Mildred buys him two homing pigeons, but they fly away two days later. Norman Mitchell and Ted Burnett appear in this episode.
37	7	"I Gotta Horse"	18 December 1979
Mildred's mother (Gretchen Franklin), reveals to Mildred's sister Ethel that Mildred may be in possession of a valuable antique horse statue when one just like it appears in the Country Life magazine and is valued at £10,000. Ethel asks Mildred for it, claiming that she wants it to remember their father by. When Mildred shows it to Ann, she tells Mildred that a similar statue recently sold for £10,000. Mildred has it valued, and finds out that it is a cheap reproduction which was made in Birmingham in 1927 that is worth 30 shillings. George is proud of having bought three of them for £5 each — until Mildred tells him that they are cheap copies. Fourmile releases the family's pet mouse into the Ropers' garden. When Ethel next visits, Mildred sells her horse to her for £15. When George brings the mouse into the house, Ethel drops the horse and it breaks. Mildred points out that she has three more of them. John Carlin and Mimi De Braie appear in this episode.
38	8	"The Twenty-Six Year Itch"	25 December 1979
George takes a shine to Beryl (Patsy Rowlands), the new barmaid at the local pub. After she tells him that she is a widow, he claims to be a widower. Mildred attends the Young Conservatives' Christmas dinner and dance with Jeffrey whilst Ann and their sons visit her mother. Mildred leaves early by taxi after accidentally spilling her drink on her dress. George takes Beryl to the Fourmiles', pretending that it is his house, letting himself in with the key he was given. George admits to Beryl that he is married, and goes home. Mildred is angry with George when he calls her Beryl.

== Film version ==
Following the fifth series, a feature film version of the series was produced in 1980. The film was not written by Brian Cooke and Johnnie Mortimer but by Dick Sharples. The Fourmiles only played a small role in the film, which focused on George and Mildred celebrating their wedding anniversary, at Mildred's insistence, at an upmarket London hotel. It featured several guest stars including Stratford Johns, Kenneth Cope and Vicki Michelle. The film was neither a critical nor box office success. It was shown on ITV on Christmas Day 1980.

== The end ==
The final caption of the George and Mildred film read "The End - or is it the beginning?" It was to prove to be the former as Yootha Joyce died from portal cirrhosis of the liver due to chronic alcoholism on 24 August 1980, before the film was released. Friends and colleagues were unaware that Joyce had been habitually consuming half a bottle of brandy every day for over 10 years.

In 2004, on an audio commentary on the Australian Umbrella DVD release of George and Mildred: the Complete Series 2, Brian Murphy revealed that there had been plans for a sixth series of eight episodes of the show. These were to have been recorded in late 1980. Murphy also revealed that this was due to have been the final series of George and Mildred, as he and Yootha Joyce were afraid of being typecast after playing the characters since 1973 on television and in two films. However, despite scripts being written, Joyce's hospitalisation and subsequent death brought a premature end to the show. Her funeral took place on the day the cast were due to begin rehearsals for the new series. Speaking of their relationship in a 2001 ITV programme, The Unforgettable Yootha Joyce, Murphy said that when they had first met at Joan Littlewood's Theatre Workshop he had, "always regarded Yootha as very stylish and very confident. I was rather over-awed by her at first, full of admiration for her. "At her death, "People said, 'You've lost a working partner' and I said, 'No, I've lost a chum'... and then I realised I've lost my working partnership as well...".

Thames Television did consider producing a spin-off for the character of George, looking at him cope with life as a widower. However, this project did not materialise, though Brian Murphy did reunite with George and Mildred co-star Roy Kinnear and writers Johnnie Mortimer and Brian Cooke for The Incredible Mr Tanner, a comedy produced by Thames Television in 1981.
