= Moviola (cinema service) =

Moviola is a rural cinema service operating in the British West Country counties of Dorset, Devon, Hampshire, Somerset and Wiltshire. It provides a cinema service for rural communities that have no or distant access to cinema theatres, showing a range of films in village halls and other venues. It advertises itself as "The South and West's Rural Multiplex", and with 80 screening venues is one of the largest rural film schemes in Europe. It is a registered charity.

== History ==
Moviola started operations in 2001, and after a few years of pilot operations it was first incorporated as "Dorset Film Touring" in February 2004. As "Dorset Film Touring" it was registered as United Kingdom Charity 1107649 in January 2005. In the summer of 2009, the Company and Charity officially adopted the name "Moviola". Moviola is governed by a small Board whose members have the dual functions of Trustees of the Charity and Directors of the Trading Company (Moviola Ltd). The Board members are recruited from the local community and from the film exhibition sector and serve in an entirely voluntary capacity. The Oscar-winning screenwriter and actor Julian Fellowes, who lives in Dorset, is Patron of Moviola.

The number of venues and attendances has increased greatly since the inception of the project in 2001, as shown in the following table:

Year	Number of shows	Attendances
2001-2	52	2,528
2002-3	79	3,760
2003-4	162	7,153
2004-5	220	11,868
2005-6	398	28,381
2006-7	630	40,951
2007-8	664	40,698
2008-9	720	46,486

== Organisation ==
Moviola shows films in 80 venues across the five counties. Its rural cinema service is made up of four elements:

- A complete cinema service for village halls and other rural venues across Dorset, Devon, Hampshire, Somerset and Wiltshire.
- A programming and film booking service for individual rural venues and touring schemes across the UK.
- Advice and guidance (consultancy) for anyone who wishes to establish their own rural cinema.
- Projection services for festivals, churches and anyone wanting to run a special event.

== Screenings ==
Moviola operates a partnership model: in each of the rural communities in which it operates, it has a partner group that chooses the films and the dates of the screenings, arranges the venue, organises local publicity and sells tickets. The partners also manage the show, determining aspects such as length of interval and start times. Moviola organises the booking of the films, maintains links with film distributors, provides marketing materials, tickets, all the equipment and the presenter for the show. This provision of suitable equipment is very important as many venues do not have high quality projection and sound equipment. A recent Daily Telegraph article about Moviola and other rural cinema screening services stated that "all [Moviola] needs to put on a show is a DVD of the film, a table and a 13-amp electric socket."

Moviola was instrumental in breaking the cult film Morris: A Life with Bells On, by showing it when other mainstream distributors could not be found.
