= Morris: A Life with Bells On =

2009 film by Lucy Akhurst

- Original film poster
- Directed by: Lucy Akhurst
- Written by: Charles Thomas Oldham
- Produced by: Charles Thomas Oldham; Lucy Akhurst
- Starring: Charles Thomas Oldham; Ian Hart; Derek Jacobi; Dominique Pinon; Greg Wise; Naomie Harris; Aidan McArdle; Sophie Thompson; Harriet Walter
- Cinematography: Roger Chapman
- Edited by: Nick Carew
- Music by: Richard Lumsden
- Release date: 27 September 2009
- Running time: 100 minutes
- Country: United Kingdom
- Language: English
- Budget: £500,000

Morris: A Life with Bells On is a 2009 British independent film, a comic mockumentary about morris dancing.

== Cast ==
- Charles Thomas Oldham as Derecq Twist, Millsham Morrisman
- Derek Jacobi as Quentin Neely
- Ian Hart as Endeavour Hungerfjord Welsh
- Dominique Pinon as Jean Baptiste Poquelin, Millsham Morrisman
- Greg Wise as Miloslav Villandry
- Naomie Harris as Sonja
- Aidan McArdle as Jeremy, The Producer
- Sophie Thompson as Glenda
- Harriet Walter as Professor Compton Chamberlayne
- Jasper Britton as Will Frosser, Millsham Morrisman
- Pascal Langdale as Preston Tannen
- Richard Lumsden as Plush Gurney, Millsham Morrisman
- Clive Mantle as Muff Barcock, Millsham Morrisman
- John Boswall as Mr Staveley
- Adam Ewan as Boothby Pagnell, Millsham Morrisman
- Andy Black as Lydiard Sperling, Millsham Morrisman
- Lucy Akhurst as Skye Le Cornu

== Development ==
Morris: A Life with Bells On was written by Charles Thomas Oldham (known as Chaz Oldham), who also co-produced it with his wife, the film's director Lucy Akhurst. The film's production company was Twist Films, set up by Oldham and Akhurst.

Oldham spent his later teen years living with a family who were keen morris dancers, and he realised that the English folk dance and its traditions were a rich subject for a film. He went on to qualify as a lawyer but turned to acting and writing. He gradually developed the script of Morris: A Life with Bells On, and drew up a wish-list of actors he would like to have in the film.

== Filming ==
Although a low-budget film – it cost a total of £500,000 to make – Oldham was successful in fulfilling his wish-list and the film features some well-known actors including Derek Jacobi, Ian Hart, Dominique Pinon, Greg Wise, Harriet Walter, Naomie Harris and Sophie Thompson. Oldham plays the lead role and Akhurst also appears in the film. A number of real-life morris sides were used as extras in the filming.

The film was shot in London and parts of south west England in the summer of 2007, one of the wettest on record up to that date. Filming locations were predominantly in the West Country counties of Dorset and Wiltshire, and included Sandbanks beach in Dorset (doubling with the addition of a few palm trees as Los Angeles' Venice Beach), Poole in Dorset and Tisbury in Wiltshire. The Compasses Inn at Lower Chicksgrove in Wiltshire served as the Traveller's Staff pub, and the climax of the film was shot at Wimborne Folk Festival at Wimborne in Dorset.

== Release and reception ==
The film struggled to find a widespread distribution deal, as distributors felt it was too niche in its appeal to be profitable. Oldham and Akhurst organised a tour of village halls throughout the West Country from January to March 2009, in local venues such as village halls. Moviola, a company and registered charity that specialises in such local screenings, showed the film. The film became a word-of-mouth hit through this route, and allowed Oldham and Akhurst to bypass the distributors and go directly to the exhibitors, bolstered by an internet petition.

In May 2009 the film had its international premiere at the 35th Seattle International Film Festival, where it was awarded joint third place in the Golden Space Needle Audience Award for best film.

The film had its British premiere at the Prince Charles Cinema in London on 24 September 2009 and was released in a few cinemas in the Picturehouse chain on 27 September 2009. Although it had a limited release, on its opening day it had a higher take per screen than the studio-backed big budget film The Soloist.

Reviews were generally positive. In an article in The Times, director Ken Russell (another director renowned for filming in the West Country) considered that the film was "a sophisticated faux-naive film that combines the style of the style of Best in Show, The Full Monty, Zoolander and Babe ... Oldham has managed to walk that tightrope between irony and sincerity and come down squarely on the side of heart." Jonathan Brown of The Independent considered that "shot in mockumentary style that evokes The Office and This is Spinal Tap, A Life with Bells On is an affectionate if uncompromisingly comic examination of this most peculiar of English traditions", while Jon Swaine of The Daily Telegraph called it "a cult hit". Giving it two stars out of five, Xan Brooks in The Guardian wrote that "At times its gentle, nuzzling brand of comedy is akin to being gummed by a sheep. And yet Akhurst and Oldham's tale is obviously heartfelt and frequently charming".

Part of the publicity for the film included a spoof audition tape for the lead role by Simon Pegg, and a spoof video diary by American actor Sendhil Ramamurthy from the television series Heroes. The film was released on DVD on 26 July 2010. The soundtrack composed by Richard Lumsden is also available.
