= Lucy Akhurst =

English actress, writer and director

- Born: Lucy Akhurst-Webster; 18 November 1970 (age 55); London, England
- Occupation: Actress
- Spouse: Charles Thomas Oldham

Lucy Akhurst (born 18 November 1970) is an English actress, writer and director who has been working mainly in television since the 1990s. She starred alongside Neil Morrissey in The Vanishing Man and then came to prominence in a lead role in 1999's ITV seven-part drama Wonderful You.

She appeared as Tim's (Simon Pegg) girlfriend for four episodes of UK comedy Spaced and also guest-starred as a zombie in Simon Pegg and Edgar Wright's comedy film Shaun of the Dead.

She also appeared in the 2004 series of the BBC's Monarch of the Glen.

More recently she wrote, produced and starred in Every Seven Years a short film that has won several awards. She also directed, co-produced and had a small part in the independent British film Morris: A Life with Bells On, written, co-produced by and starring her husband Chaz Oldham.

Akhurst provided the voiceovers for EastEnders in March 2009 for the Mitchell family storyline.

== Filmography ==
- The Cinder Path (1994)
- The Vanishing Man (1996)
- All Quiet on the Preston Front (1997)
- The Saint (1997)
- The Land Girls (1998)
- The Vanishing Man (1998)
- Wonderful you (1999)
- Peak Practice (1999)
- Longitude (2000) - Nurse Grace Ingram
- Holby City (2000)
- Taggart (2000)
- Beast (2000)
- Circus (2000)
- Spaced (2001) - Sophie
- In Deep (2002)
- Eroica (2003)
- Trinity (2003)
- Ultimate Force (2003) - as MI5 Liaison Officer Pru Banks
- Shaun of the Dead (2004)
- Every Seven Years (2004)
- Monarch of the Glen (2004)
- Morris: A Life with Bells On (2009)
- George Gently (2011) - as Liz Thompson in episode Goodbye China
- Midsomer Murders (2014) - as Camilla Strickland in episode Wild Harvest
