= Trinity (2003 film) =

2003 British science fiction film

- Directed by: Gary Boulton-Brown
- Written by: Gary Boulton-Brown
- Starring: Tom McCamus; Lucy Akhurst; Stephen Moyer
- Music by: Ilan Eshkeri
- Release date: 3 March 2003 (Cinequest)
- Running time: 82 minutes
- Country: United Kingdom
- Language: English

Trinity is a 2003 British science fiction film written and directed by Gary Boulton-Brown. It stars Tom McCamus as Dr. Clerval, Lucy Akhurst as Schiller, and Stephen Moyer as Brach.

== Premise ==
In a remote Arctic research station, government agents Brach and Schiller discover the mysterious genetic scientist Dr. Clerval. A psychological chess game ensues. It turns out that Schiller was a subject in one of Clerval's genetic breeding programs, and was co-dependent of him. Brach once was Clerval's henchman. He feels torn between his love for Schiller and his unadmitted, deep loyalty towards Clerval.

== Production ==
Filming took place at Bushey Campus, Hertfordshire, North London.

== Release ==
The film was shown on 3 March 2003 at the Cinequest Film & Creativity Festival and 7 April 2003 at the Philadelphia International Film Festival.
