= Which Way to the War =

1994 British television series pilot

- Series title card
- Genre: Sitcom
- Based on: an idea by Roger Mirams
- Written by: Jeremy Lloyd; David Croft
- Directed by: Roy Gould
- Starring: William Tapley; Simon Baker Denny; Terry John; Robert Hands
- Country of origin: United Kingdom
- Original language: English
- No. of episodes: 1 (pilot)

Production
- Executive producer: Don Reynolds
- Producer: David Croft
- Camera setup: Multi-camera
- Running time: 30 minutes
- Production companies: Yorkshire Television; Reg Grundy Productions

Original release
- Network: ITV
- Release: 19 August 1994

Which Way to the War is a British television sitcom pilot episode that was broadcast on 19 August 1994 on ITV. It starred William Tapley, Simon Baker Denny, Terry John and Robert Hands, and was written by Jeremy Lloyd and David Croft.

== Plot ==
Set in Libya in October 1942, during the Western Desert campaign, a party of British "Desert Rat" soldiers and a party of Australian soldiers are holed up in a remote building, when an ambulance of Italian "nurses" arrive.

== Cast ==
- William Tapley as Corporal Roy Muller
- Simon Baker Denny as Private Stan Hawke
- Terry John as Corporal Tony Genaro
- Robert Hands as Private Jock Stewart

Also featured were Sarah Payne as Mara, Nadia Sawalha as Lucia, Elisabeth Bolognini as Little Anna, Valeria Fabbri as Carla, Mandy (Amanda)Weston as Theresa, Jason Hall as Captain Gregory Swift and Martin Sadler as Able One Charlie.

== Production ==
The pilot episode, written with the intention of developing a full series, was Jeremy Lloyd and David Croft's final sitcom set during wartime, and their only sitcom produced by the ITV network. It had a working title of Mammary Mia.

The pilot was based on an idea by Roger Mirams, who was a producer with Reg Grundy Productions. The pilot's director, Roy Gould, had worked for Croft and Lloyd previously at the BBC on programmes Are You Being Served?, Hi-de-Hi!, 'Allo 'Allo! and Oh, Doctor Beeching!. Terry John, who portrayed Corporal Genaro, would later appear as Percy in Croft's final television series, Oh, Doctor Beeching!, from 1995 to 1997.

== Reception ==
The pilot was poorly received, and thus a series was not commissioned. Memorable TV described the pilot as a "typical" show by the writers, but noted that it was broadcast when the writers' style of comedy was "somewhat out of favour".

Jasper Rees, writing in The Independent, criticised the racial stereotyping of the characters, particularly the Italian prostitutes, and the predictability of there being a "houseproud homosexual" character, Private Jock Stewart, in a Croft and Lloyd series. Rees felt that certain "promising" moments in the episode were not properly capitalised on in order to reach "the point of maximum comic potential" and believed that the overall humour was cheap and vulgar.
