= A Present for Dickie =

A Present for Dickie is a British television comedy that aired from 1969 to 1970 on ITV. Cast included Dickie Henderson, Fabia Drake, Dennis Ramsden and Billy Burden. It was produced by Thames Television.

All six episodes are believed to be lost.

== Premise ==
On his way back from a tour of the Far East, Dickie is followed home by a baby elephant. Farcical situations ensue as Dickie tries to keep "Mini" hidden from visitors.

== Partial cast ==
- Dickie Henderson as Dickie
- Fabia Drake as Mrs. Upshott-Mainwaring (Mother-in-law)
- Dennis Ramsden as Parker
- Billy Burden as William
- Robert Raglan as Policeman
- Jerry Ram as Abdul
