= Grace & Favour =

British television sitcom (1992–93)

- Series title card
- Also known as: Are You Being Served? Again!
- Written by: Jeremy Lloyd; David Croft
- Directed by: Mike Stephens
- Starring: Mollie Sugden; Frank Thornton; John Inman; Wendy Richard; Nicholas Smith; Fleur Bennett; Joanne Heywood; Billy Burden
- Composers: David Croft; Roy Moore
- Country of origin: United Kingdom
- Original language: English
- No. of series: 2
- No. of episodes: 12

Production
- Producer: Mike Stephens
- Running time: 30 minutes
- Production company: BBC

Original release
- Network: BBC1
- Release: 10 January 1992 – 8 February 1993

Related
- Are You Being Served?

Grace & Favour (known as Are You Being Served? Again! in the United States) is a British television sitcom that was first broadcast on BBC1 from 10 January 1992 to 8 February 1993. It served as a sequel series to Are You Being Served?, and was written by Are You Being Served? creators and writers Jeremy Lloyd and David Croft. The series starred Mollie Sugden, Frank Thornton, John Inman, Wendy Richard and Nicholas Smith reprising their Are You Being Served? roles, and also starred Fleur Bennett, Joanne Heywood and Billy Burden.

== Plot ==
The series begins with the staff of Grace Bros returning to the store to read the will of Young Mr Grace, the former head of the department store, recently deceased while scuba diving on holiday in the Caribbean with his personal secretary, Miss Jessica Lovelock. Young Mr Grace had invested their pension funds in a multitude of antiquated businesses, the largest of which is a country manor house called Millstone Manor. The will stipulates that they cannot sell the house and split the profits, but can use the property in the manner of their choosing.

After a trip to Millstone Manor to view the property, the staff discover that Mr Rumbold caused the Millstone Manor staff to leave, due to his excellent managerial skills, and that Miss Lovelock, given accommodation in the grooms' quarters and charge of the horses, also lives at the manor. In addition, the staff learn that their pensions are minuscule. As a result, the staff decide to live in the manor in order to run it as an inn and live off the proceeds.

Meanwhile, Mr Humphries is forced by circumstance to share a bed with Mavis, the daughter of the manor's farmer, and finds that she develops a crush on him. Mrs Slocombe discovers that the manor's uncouth farmer, Maurice Moulterd, is a former lover from the war years, and tries to insist that the relationship never happened, while Captain Peacock is keen to pursue a relationship with Miss Lovelock, despite their difference in age.

== Cast ==
=== Main ===
The cast of Grace & Favour (left to right): Frank Thornton (Captain Peacock), Mollie Sugden (Mrs Slocombe), John Inman (Mr Humphries), Wendy Richard (Miss Brahms), Nicholas Smith (Mr Rumbold), Joanne Heywood (Miss Lovelock), Billy Burden (Mr Moulterd), Fleur Bennett (Mavis Moulterd).

- Mollie Sugden as Mrs Betty Slocombe
- John Inman as Mr Wilberforce Clayborne Humphries
- Wendy Richard as Miss Shirley Brahms
- Frank Thornton as Captain Stephen Peacock
- Nicholas Smith as Mr Cuthbert Rumbold
- Fleur Bennett as Mavis Moulterd
- Joanne Heywood as Miss Jessica Lovelock
- Billy Burden as Mr Maurice Moulterd

=== Recurring ===
- Michael Bilton as Mr Thorpe
- Shirley Cheriton as Miss Prescott
- Gregory Cox as Mr Frobisher
- Andrew Barclay as Malcolm Heathcliff
- Diane Holland as Celia Littlewood
- Andy Joseph as Joseph Lee
- Eric Dodson as Sir Robert
- Maggie Holland as Mrs Cleghampton

== Episodes ==
=== Series 1 (1992) ===
No. overall	No. in series	Title	Original release date
1	1	"Episode 1"	10 January 1992
Young Mr Grace has died and Grace Bros has closed down. On behalf of the pension fund, Mr Grace acquired a Tudor manor house with farm which at the moment is being run as a country house hotel. Being the only source of pension money for the retired staff, they all decide to visit for the weekend to investigate its possibilities.
2	2	"Episode 2"	17 January 1992
The staff decide to take over Millstone Manor and run it for themselves. The home farm, run by Maurice Moulterd and his daughter Mavis, provides fresh eggs for breakfast, but Mrs Slocombe gets a shock whilst collecting them. Mr Humphries and Mavis "to and fro" in the woodshed.
3	3	"Episode 3"	24 January 1992
Mrs Slocombe finds herself in court, charged with stealing a gypsy cart. Captain Peacock and the others travel to town on the back of Moulterd's pig cart. Once in court the staff come forward as character witnesses.
4	4	"Episode 4"	31 January 1992
A group of American tourists, the hotel's first guests, are due to arrive at the weekend but there are still very few replies to Mr Rumbold's advertisement for staff. The only alternative is for them all to knuckle down and try to make the place presentable.
5	5	"Episode 5"	7 February 1992
A photograph is organised for the hotel brochure. The staff decide to fill the vacant positions at the Manor themselves. Something ghastly (with a bald head and big ears) walks about the manor on a dark and stormy night.
6	6	"Episode 6"	14 February 1992
A group of American tourists arrive for the weekend as part of their European tour. The former shop workers do their best, but the Americans are expecting a church service and the traditional Harvest Thanksgiving dance.

=== Series 2 (1993) ===
No. overall	No. in series	Title	Original release date
7	1	"Episode 1"	4 January 1993
Mrs Slocombe's cat, Tiddles, gets gummed up. A gun discovered by Captain Peacock brings the riot police to Millstone Manor where the criminal records of such notorious characters as "Knuckles Rumbold" are revealed.
8	2	"Episode 2"	11 January 1993
The staff organize a cricket match against the townspeople. The match is marred by the jealousy of Malcolm Heathcliff, who sees Mr Humphries as a rival for Mavis's affections. The highlights of the match are a fantastic dive by Mrs Slocombe and a winning stroke by Mr Humphries.
9	3	"Episode 3"	18 January 1993
Mrs Slocombe's long-lost husband pays an unexpected visit after an absence of 42 years, forcing Mrs Slocombe into hiding. When the staff find that he intends to purchase the hotel, they temporarily expand the staff to make the idea seem unprofitable.
10	4	"Episode 4"	25 January 1993
Mr Rumbold, Mrs Slocombe, Mr Humphries and Miss Brahms plant potatoes. Captain Peacock removes a petrified cat from a niche in the attic, precipitating a series of supernatural events.
11	5	"Episode 5"	1 February 1993
After Mr Rumbold complains that he gets no respect, the staff vote to share authority democratically. The staff play darts against the local team at the village pub. Captain Peacock leads a commando raid to rescue a flock of sheep, when the staff, expecting them to be breeding stock, discovers that the man they sold the sheep to, plans to sell them to the knackers. Guest Stars: Nick Scott as Policeman, Colin Edwynn as Landlord, Andrew Barclay as Malcolm Heathcliff, Paul Humpoletz as Henry Heathcliff and Martin Friend as Old Man.
12	6	"Episode 6"	8 February 1993
A Mongolian tour group gets a cultural extravaganza from the staff at Millstone Manor. The high point of their visit occurs on the presentation of the ballet by Mr "Sergei" Humphries and Miss "Natasha" Lovelock.

== Production ==
=== Background ===
The idea of a spin-off was suggested by the cast of Are You Being Served? almost immediately after the original series ended in 1985. Writers Jeremy Lloyd and David Croft liked the idea, but they agreed, along with the cast, that the department store format was exhausted and that any spin-off would require a change of location. Despite the enthusiasm of the original cast, it was almost seven years before Lloyd and Croft brought them back to television. Croft and Lloyd discussed possible ideas for a sequel series for several months. Initial ideas for a spin-off involved the cast deciding to take a holiday on Young Mr Grace's yacht, however, they become shipwrecked on a Robinson Crusoe-style island. The writers discussed the plot for a few days, but the idea, as Croft stated, "didn't seem to gel and, having got only to page 18 after two days, we thought it best to consign our efforts to the waste-paper basket". Another idea was discussed for several months, before the writers settled on the final idea. Public demand for the series was high, which necessitated the production of Grace & Favour. Most of the original cast were able to return easily, with the exception of Wendy Richard, who had since joined the television soap opera EastEnders (1985–present); she requested permission to be temporarily written out of that programme so she could reprise her role of Miss Brahms. The cast were enthusiastic to be involved in the programme, and enjoyed being able to film scenes on location. In a 1999 documentary, Croft described the series as a "marvellous sort of sequel" to Are You Being Served?.

While the idea for the series had been discussed and planned by writers Croft and Lloyd before the death of British publishing tycoon Robert Maxwell, the series aired a few months after his death; Maxwell was revealed to have borrowed heavily against his own employees's pensions, in a similar vein to what Young Mr Grace does in the series. The first episode of the second series contains a number of satirical references to the wrongful conviction and hanging of Derek Bentley for the murder of a policeman. The case revolved around the issue of whether Bentley's words "Let him have it, Chris" to his associate Christopher Craig were meant literally ("Let him have the gun") or figuratively ("Open fire!"). The case was widely publicised and was the subject of a film titled Let Him Have It starring Christopher Eccleston, that was released in October 1991, just over a year before the episode was broadcast.

Grace & Favour is different from Are You Being Served? in that it involves a continuous story arc, with certain plot elements, such as the relationship between Mr Humphries and Mavis Moulterd, unfolding throughout each episode. This in turn allowed the series to involve more complex storylines and subplots, making it possible to include returning guest stars and location shooting, neither of which was done on Are You Being Served?.

=== Title ===
When broadcast in the United States, the series was titled Are You Being Served? Again!, rather than the original title Grace & Favour. Croft wanted to call the series by its American title. However, the BBC preferred the title Grace & Favour. Lloyd preferred the American title, as did John Inman, who was a "bit upset" that the "much more sensible" American title was not used in the UK, believing that the American title would have helped the show to have "a ready-made audience" as it did in the US.

The title of the series is a double play on words. A "grace and favour" is a home or other property owned by a monarch, government or other owner, but given to the use of a faithful retainer upon retirement, as with the retired characters in the series. "Grace" is the surname of the founder and owner of Grace Brothers (the fictional department store where the characters previously worked) who was also the previous owner of Millstone Manor.

=== Casting ===
The main cast included the five actors and characters who appeared in every episode of Are You Being Served?: John Inman (Mr Humphries), Mollie Sugden (Mrs Slocombe), Frank Thornton (Captain Peacock), Wendy Richard (Miss Brahms) and Nicholas Smith (Mr Rumbold). New regular cast members included Joanne Heywood, who previously appeared in the Mike Stephens-directed First of the Summer Wine (1988–89) and the first series of The Brittas Empire (1991–97), who portrayed Miss Lovelock; Billy Burden, who portrayed farmer Maurice Moulterd, had previously appeared in Hi-de-Hi! (1980–88), written by Croft and Jimmy Perry and directed by Stephens; and Fleur Bennett, who played his daughter, Mavis. Several new recurring characters were added to the show, including Michael Bilton as Mr Grace's solicitor, Mr Thorpe, and his assistant, Miss Prescott, played by Shirley Cheriton. Christine Gernon, who served as production assistant on the series, recalled that Heywood and Bennett "fitted in really well" with the original cast members, while the "cast got on so well; they were just all so pleased to be back together".

Trevor Bannister, who portrayed Mr Lucas in Are You Being Served? until 1980 when he left following a disagreement with the BBC, was not asked to appear in Grace & Favour. In a 1999 documentary, Bannister stated that he "didn't feel [the series] worked at all", believing that "you can't just take that group, because it's a successful formula, and just move it somewhere else". Mike Berry, who portrayed Mr Spooner for the last three series of Are You Being Served?, was not asked to appear in the sequel series, though stated that he would have if he was asked. Berry recalled that Arthur English, who portrayed Mr Harman, was retired by that stage, and therefore was in "no position to return"; however, Lloyd wrote in his 1993 autobiography, Listen Very Carefully, I Shall Say This Only Once!, that he hoped that English would appear in a potential third series.

Throughout the series, Inman's character, Mr Humphries, is required by circumstance to share a bed with Mavis Moulterd, the farmer's daughter. Despite the media and fans of the series believing the character to be homosexual, Inman stated in 1999 that "[he couldn't] see how he could be gay when he spent most of Grace & Favour in bed with a beautiful blonde called Fleur Bennett". Croft and Lloyd explained that they wrote the scenario involving Mr Humphries sharing his bed with the farmer's daughter because they did not want him to be, as Lloyd stated, "thought of as a man who couldn't have a girlfriend". In addition, Croft stated that they "never wrote him" as being homosexual.

=== Filming ===
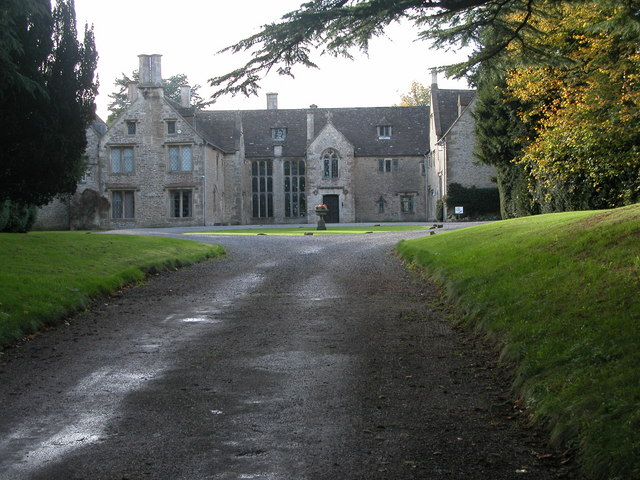
Chavenage House, where primary filming of the series took place.

All external filming for the series was undertaken in and around Tetbury in Gloucestershire. Primary filming was at Chavenage House, which was used for Millstone Manor, just outside Tetbury. Indoor filming was recorded in front of a live studio audience. Production assistant Christine Gernon recalled that neither Croft nor Lloyd were present often for the filming of the series, in part due to the series being one of the few not to be produced or directed by Croft himself.

Audio samples of Grace & Favour (media help)

"Grace & Favour" theme

The "elegant" theme tune, which "adds to the show's bucolic charm", was composed by Croft and Roy Moore, who had previously worked on various Croft productions, including 'Allo! 'Allo! (1982–92) and You Rang M'Lord? (1988–93). Moore commented that there was "a lot of incidental music" in the series, which allowed for more frequent establishing shots of the cast and of locations.

=== Cancellation ===
In a 1993 interview on American television, Inman recalled that "the BBC axed it in their wisdom, and it was a case of 'No, we're not doing anymore'". Inman was "a bit distressed" by the series's cancellation, because Lloyd had approached him and explained the storyline for the third series, in which a wedding was to be arranged for Mr Humphries and Mavis Moulterd, whereby Inman would portray Mr Humphries's mother in a dual role, as he had done in the original series. Mavis would instead choose to run off with a village boy; Mr Humphries would be heartbroken, falling into Mrs Slocombe's arms, much to her delight. Heywood stated that, when news was received that the series had been cancelled, it "hit the original cast members even harder than us newer characters", resulting in the cast members "los[ing] touch" with each other. Heywood stated that the series was cancelled due to it "just [not being] his cup of tea", referring to the then-BBC1 Controller, Alan Yentob. The series was the last written by Lloyd and Croft together.

== International broadcasts ==
In the United States, the series was broadcast on PBS member stations as Are You Being Served? Again! in 1992. The first series was broadcast on WNEO from 13 July to 20 July 1992 at 11:00 pm, each weeknight; the whole six episodes were screened via television marathon on 18 July, from 8:00 pm to 11:00 pm. In a 2021 interview, series composer Roy Moore described the series as being "very popular" in the US, stating that it is rebroadcast there "all the time".

In Australia, both series were broadcast consecutively from January to April 1994, airing at 8:00 pm on CTC and Network Ten, after a repeat episode of Are You Being Served?.

== Home media releases ==
The series, under the title Are You Being Served? Again!, was first released in the United States on 7 September 2004 by BBC Warner. It was later released in Australia by Roadshow Entertainment on 14 May 2009, under the Grace & Favour title. The series was subsequently released for the first time in the United Kingdom on 23 May 2016 by Eureka Entertainment.

== Reception ==
The Evening Standard's Victor Lewis-Smith, writing midway through the second series on 26 January 1993, was critical of the series and its humour, stating that it "makes 'Allo 'Allo look like Beckett", citing another of Croft and Lloyd's television sitcoms that had ended the previous year. Lewis-Smith wrote that, rather than being a comedy programme, the series is "more your funny aunts and uncles doing a routine at the Christmas party", and believed that the only way to enjoy the series would be if you "feel well-disposed towards the actors". In a 1999 documentary, Inman stated that the characters "slightly lost [their] way" in the series, owing to the loss of "[their] pecking order, because no one was anyone's boss because we'd all retired, and there was no threat. And you can't really do good comedy without a threat".

The British Comedy Guide praised the series, stating that the scripts were typical of a Croft and Lloyd series, consisting of "rip-roaring innuendo, gag-packed scripts and daft adventures aplenty – with the odd genial national stereotype for good measure". The Guide wrote that Are You Being Served? fans would "enjoy the continued adventures in the country" of the original characters, while the new characters introduced for the series worked "perfectly". The Guide concluded by stating that the series "is more tightly-plotted than its parent, bringing refreshed life into the characters with their new setting and problems to surmount". Tim Dawson, writing for the same website in 2025, wrote that, while "nobody would pretend Grace & Favour is the best sitcom ever made, and it never ascends to the heights of Lloyd and Croft's earlier work", the show nonetheless offers "plenty to enjoy". Dawson praised the "delightful" writers and cast, and praised the show's "charming goings on", which "offer a breezy and welcome retreat".
