= Charles Thomas Oldham =

British actor and filmmaker

Charles Thomas Oldham, also known by his other professional name Tom Oldham and personally as Chaz Oldham, is a British actor, voiceover artist, screenwriter and film producer.

Oldham was born in Gateshead, England, and spent his early years there, before his family moved south. They moved again, this time to Australia when he was 15; he opted to stay in the UK to finish his schooling, and moved in with the family next door, who were keen morris dancers.

Oldham studied law at Cambridge University before working as an investment banker and entrepreneur. He gave up his career in banking to become an actor, graduating from drama school at 32. Working as Tom Oldham, he enjoyed some success as a voiceover artist and appeared in one episode of Heartbeat.

Oldham wrote the screenplay for, co-produced and starred in the 2009 film, Morris: A Life with Bells On, a mockumentary about morris dancing. He is married to Lucy Akhurst, who directed the film.
