= Inside George Webley =

British TV comedy series (1968–1970)

- Roy Kinnear and Patsy Rowlands
- Genre: Sitcom
- Written by: Willis Hall; Keith Waterhouse
- Directed by: David Mallet
- Starring: Roy Kinnear; Patsy Rowlands
- Country of origin: United Kingdom
- Original language: English
- No. of series: 2
- No. of episodes: 12

Production
- Producers: Bill Hitchcock; John Duncan
- Running time: 30 minutes
- Production company: Yorkshire Television

Original release
- Network: ITV
- Release: 24 September 1968 – 25 March 1970

Inside George Webley is a British comedy television series that originally aired on ITV in two series between 1968 and 1970. It starred Roy Kinnear as a bank clerk and a compulsive worrier and Patsy Rowlands as Rosemary his long-suffering wife.

== Cast ==
=== Main ===
- Roy Kinnear as George Webley
- Patsy Rowlands as Rosemary Webley

=== Guest ===
- Les Dawson as Mr. Marigold
- Roy Hudd as Simon
- Hattie Jacques as Mavis Butterfield
- Dandy Nichols as Mrs. Duggins
- Graham Stark as Smelly
- Max Wall as Mr. Garrick
- James Bolam as Policeman
- Peter Butterworth as Dr. Horniman
- J. G. Devlin as Irishman
- Clive Dunn as Ticket collector
- Gorden Kaye as Clerk
- Frank Thornton as Maître d'
- Marjorie Rhodes as Dirty Dora

== Bibliography ==
- Newcomb, Horace . Encyclopedia of Television. Routledge, 2014.
