= Oh Happy Band! =

1980 British television sitcom

- Animated titlescreen for the series, used from the second episode onwards.
- Genre: Sitcom
- Written by: Jeremy Lloyd; David Croft
- Directed by: David Croft; John Kilby
- Starring: Harry Worth; Margaret Clifton; Jonathan Cecil; John Horsley; Billy Burden; Tom Mennard
- Theme music composer: David Croft
- Opening theme: "Oh Happy Band!"
- Ending theme: "Oh Happy Band!"
- Country of origin: United Kingdom
- Original language: English
- No. of series: 1
- No. of episodes: 6

Production
- Producer: David Croft
- Cinematography: Max Samett; Mark Chapman
- Editors: Marcus Thompson; Mike Robotham
- Camera setup: Multi-camera
- Running time: 30 minutes

Original release
- Network: BBC1
- Release: 3 September – 8 October 1980

Oh Happy Band! is a British television sitcom written by Jeremy Lloyd and David Croft. The series ran for six episodes on BBC1, from 3 September to 8 October 1980, and featured the final screen appearance of comedian Harry Worth. For musical sequences, the series featured the Aldershot Brass Ensemble.

Since broadcast, the series has not been repeated or released on any home consumer media.

== Plot ==
Harry Bennington (Harry Worth) is the conductor of a brass band in the small, fictional northern town of Nettlebridge. During the course of the series, he and his fellow band members become involved in a campaign to prevent the building of a new airport over their town.

== Cast ==
- Harry Worth as Harry Beddington
- Margaret Clifton as Miss Mayhew
- Jonathan Cecil as Mr Herbert
- John Horsley as Mr Braithwaite
- Billy Burden as Mr Sowerby
- Tom Mennard as Mr Pilgrim
- Tony Sympson as Mr Giles
- Jan Holden as Mrs Draper
- Moira Foot as Glenda
- Peggy Ann Clifford as Mrs Tickford
- Harold Bennett as the Vicar

== Episodes ==
| No. overall | No. in series | Title | Produced & Directed by | Written by | Original release date |
|---|---|---|---|---|---|
| 1 | 1 | "A Bird in the Bush" | David Croft | Jeremy Lloyd and David Croft | 3 September 1980 |
Note: This episode was produced as a pilot episode, and featured a different, non-animated title sequence.
| 2 | 2 | "Let Bygones Be Bygones" | David Croft | Jeremy Lloyd and David Croft | 10 September 1980 |
| 3 | 3 | "A Record to Be Proud of" | David Croft | Jeremy Lloyd and David Croft | 17 September 1980 |
| 4 | 4 | "Home Cure" | David Croft | Jeremy Lloyd and David Croft | 24 September 1980 |
| 5 | 5 | "A Song in the Air" | David Croft | Jeremy Lloyd and David Croft | 1 October 1980 |
| 6 | 6 | "Diplomatic Privilege" | David Croft and John Kilby | Jeremy Lloyd and David Croft | 8 October 1980 |

== Production ==
The role of lead character Harry Bennington was originally offered to Gorden Kaye. However, Kaye was unavailable and the role was instead offered to Harry Worth.

Musical sequences in the series were performed by the Aldershot Brass Ensemble. A week before the series' premiere on 3 September 1980, British Mouthpiece informed its reader that "a player who took part [in the series] assures our reporter that the actual situations do not try to make the band [Aldershot Brass Ensemble] take part, or make them look foolish, as some of the other shows using bands during the past year have not brought much credit to our movement".

The theme music, "Oh Happy Band!", was composed by series co-writer David Croft. It was performed by the Aldershot Brass Ensemble and sung by the Fred Tomlinson Singers. In 1980, a 7" single of the theme tune, along with a B-side of "Our Boys Will Shine Tonight", was released by BBC Records.

== Reception ==
Writer and historian Mark Lewisohn, in the BBC Guide to Comedy, wrote that the series was: "An odd amalgam of ideas from established sitcom creators Lloyd and Croft... Considering the usual dependability of the major protagonists here, it is fair to say that Oh Happy Band! was flat rather than sharp."

Nostalgia Central noted that: "So utterly inept and banal was the show that had it not been written by comedy stalwarts Jeremy Lloyd and David Croft, it likely would have never been screened."

Iwan Fox, writing for 4 Bars Rest, described the series as "terrible" and "rather excruciating", criticising the "strained" and "rather threadbare" storylines and the "stereotypical" characters. Fox noted that the casting mirrored that of Dad's Army, with Harry Bennington, "a small, slightly bumptious ineffectual leader of men", mirroring Captain Mainwaring, and the rest of Bennington's band mirroring the members of Mainwaring's platoon. However, Fox acknowledged that there were "occasional gem[s]" in the series.
