= Joanne Heywood =

English actress

- Born: York, England
- Occupation: Actress
- Years active: 1986–present
- Website: joanneheywood.com

Joanne Heywood is an English television actress, probably best known for her role as Jessica Lovelock in Grace & Favour, a spin-off series of Are You Being Served?.

== Career ==
Born in York, Heywood was educated in York, Guildford and in Sydney, Australia. She studied musical theatre at the Guildford School of Acting and, after graduating, made her professional stage debut in 1985 production of the pantomime Jack and the Beanstalk at York's Theatre Royal. For the next decade, she regularly appeared in pantomime at the same venue, often as principal boy. During this period, she also performed in stage musicals, including regional productions of Annie, Gypsy and Camelot, as well as the world premieres of Scrooge: The Musical and the stage adaptation of High Society.

Heywood's television debut was in the role of Dilys on the short-lived BBC series First of the Summer Wine. In 1991, she made appearances on the television shows The New Statesman (natural selection, se3) and The Brittas Empire. In addition to her role as Jessica Lovelock, Heywood played Sally Bennett in the Gerry Poulson film Stanley's Dragon. She has also guest-starred in Knightmare, Next of Kin, four episodes of Coronation Street and A Prince Among Men.

In recent years, her television appearances have become less regular. She has appeared in Heartbeat, Emmerdale Farm and My Hero. Since then, Heywood has continued to perform frequently in regional and West End theatre productions, including plays, musicals and pantomimes.

== Filmography ==
=== Television ===
Year	Title	Role	Notes
1986	Brush Strokes	Woman in Jacuzzi	Episode: #1.13
1988–1989	First of the Summer Wine	Dilys	13 episodes
1991	The New Statesman	Cher Titley	Episode: "Natural Selection"
1991	The Brittas Empire	Mandy	Episode: "Stop Thief"
1991	The Les Dennis Laughter Show		Episode: #5.6
1992–1993	Grace & Favour	Jessica Lovelock	12 episodes
1994	Ben Elton: The Man from Auntie	Telephone operator	Episode: #2.5
1994	Knightmare	Stiletta	5 episodes
1994	Artrageous	Kate	
1996	Next of Kin	Caroline	Episode: "Pollution"
1997	A Prince Among Men	Susan Hamilton	Episode: "Monkey Business"
2000	Heartbeat	Rachel Osborne	Episode: "The Fool on the Hill"
2000	Kiss Me Kate	Sarah	Episode: "Christmas"
2004	EastEnders	Hayley	Episode: #1.2770
2005	My Hero	Wendy Williams	Episode: "The First Husbands' Club"
2006	Losing It	Fish Family Mum	Television film
2018	At the Bar	Ruth Karp QC	Television short
2004–2020	Emmerdale	Various	9 episodes
1997–2022	Coronation Street	Angela Instructor Miss Finn	4 episodes

=== Film ===
Year	Title	Role	Notes
1994	Stanley's Dragon	Sally Bennett	
2014	Gone	Susanne Taylor	Short film
2017	With Friends Like These	Kathy	Short film
2019	Sequins	Debbie Bigsby	Short film
2023	Gran Turismo	Clothing Customer	

== Stage roles ==
Year	Title	Venue	Role
1985	Jack and the Beanstalk	Theatre Royal, York	
1987	High Society (musical)	Victoria Palace, London	
1988–1989	Camelot (musical)	Liverpool Playhouse, Liverpool	
1992	Scrooge: The Musical	Alexandra Theatre, Birmingham	Isabel
1998	Out of Order (play)	Mill at Sonning, Sonning Eye	Jane Worthington
1999	The Strange & Surprising Adventures of Robinson Crusoe	Palace Theatre, Watford	Dolly
2000	Behind the Scenes at the Museum (play)	Theatre Royal, York	Patricia
2000–2001	Dick Whittington (pantomime)	Theatre Royal, York	
2001	All for Mary (play)	Mill at Sonning, Sonning Eye	Mary Millar
2002–2003	Babbies in the Wood (pantomime)	Theatre Royal, York	Principal Boy
2003–2004	Mother Goose's Silver Jubilee (pantomime)	Theatre Royal, York	Principal Boy
2005	Sleeping Beauty (pantomime)	City Varieties Music Hall, Leeds	Vulgaria
2007	Waiting for Gateaux (play)	Theatre Royal, Newcastle upon Tyne	
2007–2008	Sleeping Beauty (pantomime)	Gala Theatre, Durham City	Carabosse
2008	Birthday Suite (play)	Mill at Sonning, Sonning Eye	Kate
2008–2009	Sleeping Beauty (pantomime)	Octagon Theatre, Yeovil	Carabosse
2010	Nightfright: The Nightmare of Your Life (play)	Connaught Theatre, Worthing	Jacqui
2010	Legacy Falls (musical)	New Players Theatre, London	Taylor Taylor
