= Wonderful You (TV series) =

1999 British TV series

- Genre: Drama
- Written by: Richard Lumsden and Chris Niel
- Directed by: Matt Lipsey
- Starring: Greg Wise; Richard Lumsden; Lucy Akhurst; Dorian Healy; Miranda Pleasance; Anna Wilson-Jones; Paul Kynman; Matthew Ashforde
- Composer: Mark Russell
- Country of origin: United Kingdom
- Original language: English
- No. of series: 1
- No. of episodes: 7

Production
- Producers: Beryl Vertue; Elaine Cameron
- Production locations: London, England, UK
- Production company: Hartswood Films

Original release
- Network: ITV
- Release: 9 March – 20 April 1999

Wonderful You is a British drama television series made by Hartswood Films for the ITV network from 9 March until 13 April 1999.

== Plot ==
The series follows the lives of a group of people in their early thirties. The main plot line revolves around the relationship between Marshall (Greg Wise), his girlfriend Clare (Lucy Akhurst) and her old friend Henry (Richard Lumsden), who remains madly in love with her.

== Cast ==
=== Main cast ===
- Greg Wise as Marshall
- Richard Lumsden as Henry
- Lucy Akhurst as Clare Latimer
- Dorian Healy as Marco
- Miranda Pleasence as Heather
- Anna Wilson-Jones as Gina
- Paul Kynman as Eric
- Matthew Ashforde

=== Recurring cast ===
- James Grout as Jim
- Matthew James Thomas as Joe
- Rowena King as Laura
- Kelly Reilly as Nancy
- Ben Miles as Ray
- Bob Barrett as Rupert
- Phyllida Law as Eve
- Aden Gillet as Alan

=== Guest cast ===
Guest actors included Gary Powell, Mark Wakeling, Matilda Thorpe, Daniel Betts, Joanna Taylor, Donald Douglas.

== Episodes ==
All episodes were written by Richard Lumsden and Chris Niel, and directed by Matt Lipsey

Episode	Title	Original air date
1	Into the Blue	9 March 1999
2	Saturn's Return	16 March 1999
3	The Road to Recovery	23 March 1999
4	Love Stories	30 March 1999
5	Talking to Myself	6 April 1999
6	The Morning After	13 April 1999
7	My Name Belongs to You	20 April 1999

== Broadcast ==
The series was shown at 10 pm, after ITN moved their main evening newscast away from this traditional slot.
