= Come Back Mrs. Noah =

1978 British TV sitcom

- Series title card
- Genre: Sitcom
- Written by: Jeremy Lloyd; David Croft
- Directed by: Bob Spiers
- Starring: Mollie Sugden; Ian Lavender; Donald Hewlett; Michael Knowles; Gorden Kaye
- Country of origin: United Kingdom
- No. of series: 1
- No. of episodes: 6

Production
- Producer: David Croft
- Camera setup: Multi-camera
- Running time: 30 minutes

Original release
- Network: BBC1
- Release: 13 December 1977 – 14 August 1978

Come Back Mrs. Noah is a British television sitcom starring Mollie Sugden that aired on BBC1 from 17 July to 14 August 1978, with a pilot broadcast on 13 December 1977. It was written by Jeremy Lloyd and David Croft, who had also written Are You Being Served? which also starred Mollie Sugden. Come Back Mrs. Noah was not a success, with some regarding it as one of the worst British sitcoms ever made.

== Plot ==
In 2050, British housewife Gertrude Noah wins a cookery competition, and is awarded a tour of Britannia Seven, the UK's new Space Exploration Vehicle. The craft is accidentally sent blasting off into space with a crew consisting only of Mrs Noah, proton physicist Carstairs, neutron physicist Fanshaw, lightbulb-changer Garstang, and BBC reporter Clive Cunliffe. The series then centres on efforts to bring them back to Earth. The programme Far and Wide (a parody of Nationwide) features frequent updates read by Gorden Kaye. These reports present a reality in which Britain is the most successful nation on Earth, providing aid to countries like Germany and the United States.

== Cast ==
=== Main ===
- Mollie Sugden as Mrs Gertrude Noah
- Ian Lavender as Clive Cunliffe
- Donald Hewlett as Carstairs
- Michael Knowles as Fanshaw
- Gorden Kaye as TV Presenter
- Tim Barrett as Garfield Hawk
- Joe Black as Garstang
- Ann Michelle as Scarth Dare
- Jennifer Lonsdale as Technician

=== Guests ===
- Raymond Bowers as Professor Holzburger
- Robert Gillespie as Mission Control
- Harold Bennett as Priest
- Christopher Mitchell as Butler
- Norman Mitchell as Mr Noah
- Diana King as Mrs Carstairs
- Vicki Michelle as Maid
- Jean Gilpin as 2nd Technician
- Jennifer Guy as Ivy Basset
- Kenneth MacDonald as Space Hen

== Development ==
The series was originally intended as a vehicle for Mollie Sugden, to take her out of the usual setting in she was often cast. Co-writer David Croft was worried that others would soon start work on similar projects, so he rushed the idea past the BBC as soon as he could. Speaking to writer and historian Graham McCann years later, Croft recalled: "It speaks volumes about the flexibility of the BBC at that time but we rushed it along without any opposition at all. One of my concerns, when I spoke to [Head of Comedy] Jimmy Gilbert, was that everyone would soon be trying to do something similar in this area, because 'space' was suddenly all the rage, so I was greatly bothered about the danger of duplication. So I told him that Jeremy and I had an idea that we really liked, and that we wanted to do a pilot, but that the idea was so 'hot' that I'd prefer not to tell him what it was about. And Jimmy, to his eternal credit, didn't ask for a script, he didn't question it at all, he just told me to go ahead and do it."

== Production ==
David Croft signed up Mollie Sugden as Mrs Noah, in her first sitcom starring role. Sugden had previously starred as Mrs Slocombe in the Croft and Lloyd sitcom Are You Being Served?. Also in the series was Ian Lavender, who was known for his role as Private Pike in Dad's Army. Donald Hewlett and Michael Knowles played physicists Carstairs and Fanshaw; the two were already known to viewers as Colonel Reynolds and Captain Ashwood in the sitcom It Ain't Half Hot Mum.

== Episodes ==
No.	Title	Directed by	Written by	Original release date
1	"Pilot"	Bob Spiers	Jeremy Lloyd and David Croft	13 December 1977
As part of her prize for winning Modern Housewife Magazine's cookery competition, Mrs Noah visits the Pontefract International Space Complex (PISC) to tour the flight deck of Britain's £700 billion space station. She witnesses unproductive tea-making technology, tries on a pleasure hat, and is on the verge of testing the dream stimulation machine when the shuttle is accidentally launched into space, providing her a crash course in weightlessness.
2	"In Orbit"	Bob Spiers	Jeremy Lloyd and David Croft	17 July 1978
Mr Carstairs' wife Rowena (Diana King) and Mrs Noah's husband (Norman Mitchell) send messages to the space ship via Far and Wide. Shortly after, the crew attempts to make scrambled eggs utilising unpredictable robotic technology. Mr Cunliffe and Mrs Noah then go to the sleeping quarters, but they find themselves locked together in a cubicle for eight hours. Worsening their situation, the toilet is at the top of the wall, requiring magnetic shoes and gravity-defying skill.
3	"To the Rescue"	Bob Spiers	Jeremy Lloyd and David Croft	24 July 1978
Mr Cuncliffe and Mrs Noah have a rude sideways awakening followed by an equally disorienting trip to the automatic clothes-changing machine. As a ship manned by Garfield Hawk and his mistress, Scarth Dare, prepares to rescue them, the physicists attempt to explain the technical dynamics of the rescue operation to Mrs Noah, Mr Cunliffe and Mr Garstang, using food to represent the planets and space craft.
4	"Who Goes Home?"	Bob Spiers	Jeremy Lloyd and David Croft	31 July 1978
The rescue vehicle is damaged, and to offset the load, the group tries to decide who will stay behind. However, the issue become moot when they realise the craft can only accommodate the two rescue crew members. Teleportation is explored as an alternate method of escape, but since it's never been successful with living subjects, they decide to first test it with a clone. Unfortunately, the cloning process requires Mrs Noah to consume a ridiculous amount of liquid, and she can't help moving while the computer scanners molest her, causing the clone to emerge with an extended nose and third leg.
5	"The Housing Problem"	Bob Spiers	Jeremy Lloyd and David Croft	7 August 1978
Realising that they may be there for quite some time, Mr Garstang tries to lay claim to Mrs Noah, but she reveals that the only one whom she might be interested in is Mr Carstairs -- who's utterly uninterested. Everyone decides to move into the living quarters, but they're unfinished, so they're forced to pair up. Mrs Noah and the increasingly-antagonistic Mr Cuncliffe bunk together in a pad with a high-speed robot butler, the physicists share a more lavish flat with both a butler and a maid, and Mr Garstang is relegated to a closet. Later, Mr Carstairs decides to throw a tea party, but he doesn't invite Mr Garstang.
6	"The Last Chance"	Bob Spiers	Jeremy Lloyd and David Croft	14 August 1978
The crew decides to take advantage of the facilities, so they play a round of virtual golf. Unfortunately, their game is spoiled by a freak rainstorm that short-circuits the machinery. Later, everyone is attired in silver spacesuits and taught how to eject from the spacecraft when it enters the Earth's atmosphere, but back at Mission Control, Mr Hawk is so distracted by Ms Dare that he pushes the wrong button, catapulting the vehicle to the outer limits of the Solar System.

== Other countries ==
Come Back Mrs. Noah was also shown in the Netherlands, starting on 30 June 1979. It was also aired in Australia and on several public television stations in the United States including WPBT in Miami, Florida and WNED-TV in Buffalo, New York.

== See also ==
British sitcom
