= Billy Burden =

English actor and comedian

- Born: William George Burden; 15 June 1914; Wimborne Minster, Dorset, England, UK
- Died: 3 June 1994 (aged 79); Wimborne Minster, Dorset, England, UK
- Occupations: Actor & Comedian

William George Burden (15 June 1914 – 3 June 1994) was an English actor and comedian, who specialised in playing "yokel" roles.

He made many appearances in the Theatre Royal panto in Bath, Somerset for Frank Maddox. Debuted on ITV as William in the TV series A Present for Dickie (1969–70), but only six episodes were made. From 1972 to 1984 he guested many times on the touring cabaret show "The Rick Jango Road Show" In 1978, he guest-starred as a farmer in the episode 'Nappy Days' of George & Mildred. In 1980, he starred in another short-lived TV series, Oh, Happy Band, playing the role of Mr Sowerby. Again, only six episodes were made.

In 1982, he appeared in the Val Guest film The Boys in Blue (as the herdsman). Burden also guest-starred four times in Hi-de-Hi!; three times as Mr Turner (1986 & 1988) and once as Mr Thompson (1986). Burden is also known for his role as Morris Moulterd in Grace & Favour (American and Canadian title: Are You Being Served? Again!) (1992–93), a spin-off from Are You Being Served?. Burden died of a heart attack in 1994.
