= First of the Summer Wine =

British TV sitcom (1988–1989)

- First of the Summer Wine intertitle
- Created by: Roy Clarke
- Written by: Roy Clarke
- Directed by: Gareth Gwenlan (pilot); Mike Stephens (series)
- Starring: Derek Benfield; Sarah Dangerfield; Linda Davidson; David Fenwick; Judy Flynn; Joanne Heywood; Richard Lumsden; Paul McLain; Paul Oldham; Maggie Ollerenshaw; Helen Patrick; Peter Sallis; Gary Whitaker; Paul Wyett
- Theme music composer: Jules Lemare (alias Charles N. Daniels)
- Opening theme: "Sweet and Lovely", sung by Al Bowlly, with Roy Fox and his Band
- Country of origin: United Kingdom
- Original language: English
- No. of series: 2
- No. of episodes: 13

Production
- Producers: Gareth Gwenlan (Pilot); Mike Stephens (Series)
- Running time: 30 minutes (per episode)

Original release
- Network: BBC1
- Release: 3 January 1988 – 8 October 1989

Related
- Last of the Summer Wine

First of the Summer Wine is a British sitcom written by Roy Clarke that aired on BBC1. The pilot originally aired on 3 January 1988, and the first series of episodes followed from 4 September 1988. The show ran for two series of six episodes each, with the final episode airing on 8 October 1989. The pilot episode was produced and directed by Gareth Gwenlan. Both series of episodes were produced and directed by Mike Stephens. The show has never been repeated by the BBC, but has occasionally been repeated on Gold. It was broadcast in Australia on the Australian Broadcasting Corporation network in the early 1990s.

First of the Summer Wine is a prequel to Clarke's long running show, Last of the Summer Wine, portraying the youth of the principal characters from the mother show in the months leading up to World War II. With the possibility of war hanging over them, the young men and women enjoy their youth while trying to find a place for themselves in the world. The show used young, mostly unknown actors to play the characters, with only two actors from the original series making an appearance in the prequel.

== Production ==
With the success of Last of the Summer Wine, the BBC approved a new series by which Roy Clarke would carry over characters of the original show. In the new series, Clarke hoped to show the lives of his characters as they were in the "first summer" of their lives, as opposed to the "last summer" depicted in Last of the Summer Wine. While there would still be the "shadow of the Grim Reaper" hanging over them, this time it would be because of World War II, not due to their old age.

For the new series, Clarke used mostly young, inexperienced actors to fill the roles of the characters carried over from the original series. The actors were required to mimic the vocal characteristics and mannerisms already established in Last of the Summer Wine, to create a continuity between the two series.

The show features much 1920s and 1930s music, which adds to the nostalgic feel of the show. The theme tune is "Sweet and Lovely", sung by Al Bowlly, accompanied by Roy Fox and his Band. The recording was made in London on 18 September 1931.

== Characters ==
First of the Summer Wine followed a group of young men and women, some of whom were adapted from Last of the Summer Wine, with others being specifically created for the new show. The men consisted of Paul Wyett as the scruffy and immature Compo Simmonite; David Fenwick as meek and deep-thinking Norman Clegg; Paul McLain as snobbish ladder-climber Seymour Utterthwaite; Richard Lumsden as the eager soldier Foggy Dewhurst; Gary Whitaker as the love-smitten Wally Batty; and Paul Oldham as their friend, Sherbet. The women consisted of Helen Patrick as the object of Wally's affections, Nora Renshaw; Sarah Dangerfield as Ivy; Joanne Heywood as Dilys, Judy Flynn as Lena, and Linda Davidson as Anita Pillsworth.

The adults around the young people act as supporting characters. Peter Sallis and Maggie Ollerenshaw play David and Violet Clegg, Norman's parents. Sallis had played the role of Norman in Last of the Summer Wine and Ollerenshaw had appeared in three episodes. Derek Benfield portrays Mr Scrimshaw, the manager of the shop where Ivy, Dilys, Sherbert, Norman and Seymour work.

== Scenario ==
First of the Summer Wine takes place between May and September 1939, in the months leading up to World War II. The series revolves around the diary entries of the young Norman Clegg. Each episode begins with him resting on his bedroom windowsill and greeting the day; the words "the diary of Norman Clegg, aged 18 years" introduce the theme of each episode.

Episodes revolve around the antics of the young men of a small Yorkshire village and their usually level-headed female counterparts, all of whom are grappling with the world around them, their youth, and their experiences with the opposite sex. With rumblings of war on the European continent as Hitler's Nazi Germany and the United Kingdom become increasingly poised for war, the lives of the young men and women will be changed forever.

The scenario uses retroactive continuity. In Last of the Summer Wine, Seymour is introduced in later series, and is initially unknown to the other central characters.

== Episodes ==
Series	Episodes	Originally released	
Series	Episodes	First released	Last released
1	7	3 January 1988	9 October 1988
2	6	3 September 1989	8 October 1989

=== Series 1 (1988) ===
No. overall	No. in series	Title	Directed by	Written by	Original release date
1	1	"First of the Summer Wine"	Gareth Gwenlan	Roy Clarke	3 January 1988
Clegg has to be helped home after a game of football with his cousin Brad. Seymour calls on Miss Deborah Norbury to take her for a "spin" in his car. She gets oil on her dress and storms back into her house after a few minutes. On Sunday, after church and tea, the lads go for a walk in the hills and encounter Foggy on guard duty. After work the next day, the gang visit the local cinema before congregating at the Hygienic Fisheries.
2	2	"Taller Exercises"	Mike Stephens	Roy Clarke	4 September 1988
Clegg meets Wally, who has started doing special exercises in a bid to become taller. He is hanging from the parapet of a bridge until he loses his grip and falls into the river. Back at work, Wally and Compo join the lads in the Co-op cellar for a "fag break". That evening, the gang go to the cinema. In an effort to impress Nora, they hold Wally by the legs and dangle him over the balcony. All of them are thrown out.
3	3	"The Just Doesn't Suit"	Mike Stephens	Roy Clarke	11 September 1988
Clegg and Sherbet have to deliver a roll of lino to the home of Miss Deborah Norbury. Seymour asks them to deliver a letter to the young lady. When they try to make the delivery, Mrs Norbury insists that they have brought the wrong lino, so they have to return to the shop. Mr Scrimshaw has to go out to a meeting, so he leaves Seymour in charge. He persuades Clegg to take his place so that he can help Sherbet to deliver the replacement lino to the Norbury's house. While Seymour is away, Clegg has to measure a man for a new suit. He makes a complete mess of things. When the customer returns for a final fitting, the suit is two sizes too small.
4	4	"The Way of the Warrior"	Mike Stephens	Roy Clarke	18 September 1988
Clegg's dad is in a panic because his wife is dragging him off to the Co-op to buy a new suit. Compo has annoyed Chunky Livesey and now lives in fear of retribution. Mr Clegg goes to be measured for his new suit. He is surprised to learn that one of his shoulders is lower than the other. Chunky Livesey catches up with Compo and arranges to meet him in the park after dark for a fight. Compo 'persuades' Foggy to take his place. When Chunky turns up with a gang of his mates, the lads decide to beat a hasty retreat.
5	5	"Snuff and Stuff"	Mike Stephens	Roy Clarke	25 September 1988
Clegg, Seymour and Sherbet suspect that Mr Scrimshaw is sneaking off to the gents' fitting room to take snuff. They wonder where he hides his snuff box. The lads persuade Wally Batty to pretend to be a customer trying on some trousers. He bursts into the fitting room just in time to see Mr Scrimshaw hiding his snuff under the seat of a chair. The boys put strong pepper in Mr Scrimshaw's snuff but it does not seem to have any effect on him. Next, they add mouse droppings. This does not seem to work either, though when Mr Scrimshaw gets home he cannot understand why his cat is so interested in his moustache.
6	6	"The Great Indoors"	Mike Stephens	Roy Clarke	2 October 1988
The lads decide to spend the weekend camping in the hills. Foggy finds a place to pitch their tent – in a dilapidated barn. They try to light a fire but only succeed in filling the barn with smoke. They take a trip to the nearest pub. When they get back to the barn, they find it full of cows, so they decide to pack up and go home. On the way home, they get Seymour to tow their handcart behind his car. His brakes fail and the car ends up in a ditch.
7	7	"Youth Wanted"	Mike Stephens	Roy Clarke	9 October 1988
Mr Scrimshaw is advertising for a youth for light duties. Compo decides to apply for the job but Scrimshaw turns him down. Clegg's mother helps Compo to smarten himself up and gives him one of her husband's old suits. Scrimshaw still does not think he is suitable for a job at the Co-op. Clegg, Sherbet and Seymour are having a "fag break" in the cellar at the Co-op store. Compo joins them. Two men from head office make a surprise visit to check on air-raid precautions. Mr Scrimshaw takes them down to the cellar where they find the lads in the middle of their break. The men from head office want to know what Compo is doing there. Clegg tells them that he is a new member of staff. Mr Scrimshaw is in no position to contradict him.

=== Series 2 (1989) ===
No. overall	No. in series	Title	Directed by	Written by	Original release date
8	1	"Not Thee Missus"	Mike Stephens	Roy Clarke	3 September 1989
Compo is washing the windows at the Co-op store. Clegg, Seymour and Sherbet swap his bucket of clean water for one containing dirty water. Foggy's mother takes him to the Co-op to buy new pyjamas. Mr Scrimshaw suggests a pair 'with a stronger gusset'. Seymour is still pining for Deborah Norbury. Compo suggests a plan to help Seymour out. He'll jump out of hiding in front of the young lady, allowing Seymour to come to her rescue. The plan goes wrong when Compo jumps out in front of Mrs Norbury by mistake.
9	2	"Compo Drops In"	Mike Stephens	Roy Clarke	10 September 1989
The gang discuss the previous night's Co-op dance. Clegg is rather embarrassed because Anita Pilsworth from Accounts walked him home. Compo bemoans the fact that he cannot foxtrot. He practices with a shop dummy, thus annoying Mr Scrimshaw. Wally is still failing to impress Nora with his new motorbike, mainly because it falls over whenever he gets off. Seymour declares his intention to become a fighter pilot once the war starts. He asks Foggy what qualifications he would need. Foggy says that he would have to be able to "spin around at high speed". The lads spin him round in Mr Scrimshaw's office chair. He ends up dizzy and very unsteady on his feet. Mr Scrimshaw thinks he has been drinking. The gang goes to the cinema. Compo has no money, so he tries to sneak in through a rooftop window. He ends up dangling in front of the screen and is caught by the commissionaire.
10	3	"The Gypsy Fiddler"	Mike Stephens	Roy Clarke	17 September 1989
The lads are all feeling stiff after pushing a gypsy caravan belonging to Compo's mother. Anita Pilsworth is still chasing Clegg. Foggy is practicing camouflage techniques. He is talked into pretending to be a shop window dummy and he subsequently manages to startle Wally. Compo devises a plan to help Wally by dressing up as a gypsy fortune-teller and convincing Nora that she will marry a "short miserable little nit wearing an LNER cap". All goes well until the caravan rolls away, dragging Compo past the girls and revealing the identity of the fortune-teller.
11	4	"Ain't Love Dangerous"	Mike Stephens	Roy Clarke	24 September 1989
Deborah Norbury is unwell, so Seymour decides to take her a box of chocolates. He just needs to find a way of getting past her mother. Clegg's mother is upset because Mr Clegg's new Air-Raid Warden's uniform has arrived. It consists of an armband, a tin helmet and a whistle. With the help of the lads, Seymour tries climbing a ladder to Deborah Norbury's bedroom window so that he can deliver the chocolates. He only succeeds in scaring the young lady. Compo has been seeing Chunky Livesey's girlfriend. At the cinema, Compo learns that Chunky is waiting for him outside. He manages to sneak out with Wally sitting on his shoulders, wearing a long trench coat.
12	5	"The Body Snatchers"	Mike Stephens	Roy Clarke	1 October 1989
The lads convince Foggy that they have 'borrowed' a dead body from the Co-op funeral service. It's actually Wally wrapped in a sheet. Mr Scrimshaw spends most of the day setting up a display of tins, only to see it collapse at closing time. At the cinema, Seymour learns that Deborah Norbury is upstairs in the circle. He goes up to see her but is tripped by Lena. He falls into Deborah's lap and she walks out on him. Compo is thrown out of the cinema. He tries to sneak back in through the window in the gents' lavatory. He manages to pull a cistern off the wall and gets soaked.
13	6	"Quiet Wedding"	Mike Stephens	Roy Clarke	8 October 1989
Dilys and Brad are getting married. The lads travel to the registry office on Compo's old motorbike and sidecar, which keeps tipping up. At the reception, Compo has to sit with his trousers around his ankles because he has got oil all over them. Mr Clegg reads out the telegrams, one of which is from Brad's airbase, recalling him to duty. Later, the lads go for a walk and find Foggy guarding a bridge. He shows them his new bayonet, but manages to drop it into the river. Compo is lowered over the bridge using Seymour's long scarf. He falls in but manages to retrieve the missing bayonet. The next morning, war is declared on Germany.

== Reception ==
Alice Ghent of The Age called it a good series, but felt it was not as good as its predecessor, and said: "you'll have no problem with recognising the characters, but I miss the clink of old bones". Barbara Hooks of The Age praised the series for its characters and Roy Clarke's writing. She also called the series a "delightfully whimsical and affectionately observed comedy series".

== Home video releases ==
Series	Originally aired	Region 2 (UK)	Region 4 (Australia)
1	1988	6 June 2011	1 September 2011
2	1989	18 June 2012	10 April 2013
1/2	1988–1989	5 August 2012	7 October 2015

== See also ==
- Yorkshire dialect and accent
