= Jeremy Lloyd =

English author, screenwriter, poet, and actor (1930–2014)

Jeremy Lloyd OBE
- Lloyd c. 2010
- Born: John Jeremy Lloyd; 22 July 1930; Danbury, Essex, England
- Died: 23 December 2014 (aged 84); London, England
- Occupation: Scriptwriter
- Spouses: Dawn Bailey (m. 1955; div. 1962) Joanna Lumley (m. 1970; div. 1971) Collette Northrop (m. 1992) Elizabeth Moberly (m. 2014)
- Writing career
- Period: 1958–2014
- Genre: Television
- Notable works: Rowan & Martin's Laugh-In (1969–70); Are You Being Served? (1972–85); Come Back Mrs Noah (1977–78); Oh, Happy Band! (1980) 'Allo 'Allo! (1982–92); Grace and Favour (1992–93); Which Way to the War (1994)

John Jeremy Lloyd (22 July 1930 – 23 December 2014) was an English writer, screenwriter, author, poet and actor. He was the co-writer of several successful British sitcoms, including Are You Being Served? and 'Allo 'Allo!.

== Early years ==
John Jeremy Lloyd was born in Danbury, Essex to a mother who had been a dancer, and a petroleum engineer father who served as an officer in the Royal Engineers at the beginning of World War II. As a child he was sent to live with his grandmother in Manchester and rarely saw his parents, who he claimed had seen him as a failure. His father withdrew him from a private preparatory school in 1943.

Lloyd then worked as a junior assistant in the menswear department at Simpsons of Piccadilly and many of the characters depicted in Are You Being Served? were drawn from his recollections of his time there. He was also a travelling paint salesman and believed his early jobs gave him a better education than a university could have provided.

== Career ==
Lloyd began his career as a writer in 1958 before making his film debut two years later in 1960 in School for Scoundrels, and appeared in numerous film and television comedies during the 1960s and 1970s. Notably, he was a regular performer on Rowan & Martin's Laugh-In during the 1969–70 television season. Back in England, after he completed the season, he met actress Joanna Lumley. A decision had to be made as to whether he would return to the U.S. for the start of the new season or remain in the UK and marry Lumley.

In A Hard Day's Night (1964) Lloyd is uncredited as a tall man dancing at the disco with Beatles drummer Ringo Starr. In Help! (1965), he is a restaurant patron, also uncredited. In 1969, he filmed a scene with Peter Sellers for The Magic Christian, which co-starred Ringo Starr. Lloyd can be seen in a boardroom meeting offering marketing slogans for a really big car, and suggests "the gang's all here back seat." In 1967 he played the eccentric chimney sweep, Berthram Fortesque Wynthrope-Smythe, a.k.a. Bert Smith, in The Avengers episode, "From Venus With Love".

Lloyd's first major success as a comedy writer was with Are You Being Served? in 1972, on which he worked with David Croft. He and Croft subsequently produced 'Allo 'Allo!, which was equally popular in the UK, and a spinoff of Are You Being Served?, Grace & Favour, which aired in 1992. Lloyd wrote the poem/lyrics for the popular Captain Beaky album and books in 1980.

In 1993 Lloyd published his autobiography, titled with a phrase from 'Allo 'Allo!, called Listen Very Carefully—I Shall Say this Only Once (BBC Books: ISBN 978-0-5633-6203-6).

Lloyd was the subject of what was considered an urban legend, that he had been invited to a dinner party at the home of Sharon Tate on the night that she was murdered by followers of Charles Manson. However, the story was verified as true when the octogenarian was interviewed by Emma Freud on the BBC Radio 4 programme, Loose Ends, on 10 December 2011.

Lloyd was appointed an Officer of the Order of the British Empire (OBE) in the 2013 New Year Honours for services to British comedy.

== Personal life ==
Lloyd's first marriage in 1955 to model Dawn Bailey lasted seven years. After their marriage ended, he was briefly engaged to the actress Charlotte Rampling. Lloyd then married actress Joanna Lumley in May 1970, but that union ended in September of the same year. In 1992 he married actress Collette Northrop. In August 2014, Lloyd married Elizabeth "Lizzy" Moberly.

== Death ==
Lloyd died on 23 December 2014, aged 84, after being admitted to a London hospital with pneumonia. He was survived by his wife Elizabeth.

== Filmography ==
- School for Scoundrels (1960) – Dingle
- Man in the Moon (1960) – Jaguar driver
- Seven Keys (1961) – Freddy
- Very Important Person (1961) – Flt Lt. 'Bonzo' Baines DFC
- Flame in the Streets (1961) – (uncredited)
- Play it Cool (1962) – Man doing the Twist (uncredited)
- Operation Snatch (1962) – Capt. James
- Crooks Anonymous (1962) – M.C. at the Peekaboo Club
- Two and Two Make Six (1962) – Bowler-hatted young man
- We Joined the Navy (1962) – Dewberry Jr.
- Just for Fun (1963) – Prime Minister's son
- Death Drums Along the River (1963) – Tom Hamilton
- A Hard Day's Night (1964) – Tall Dancer at the Disco (uncredited)
- Those Magnificent Men in Their Flying Machines (1965) – Lieutenant Parsons
- Help! (1965) – Restaurant Patron (uncredited)
- A Study in Terror (1965) – Rupert (uncredited)
- The Liquidator (1965) – Young Man
- Doctor in Clover (1966) – Lambert Symington
- The Wrong Box (1966) – Brian Allen Harvey
- The Sandwich Man (1966) – Jeremy – the Guardsman
- Three Hats for Lisa (1966) – Guards Officer
- The Long Duel (1967) – Crabbe
- Smashing Time (1967) – Jeremy Tove
- Salt and Pepper (1968) – Lord Ponsonby
- The Assassination Bureau (1969) – English Officer (uncredited)
- Goodbye, Mr. Chips (1969) – Johnson (uncredited)
- The Magic Christian (1969) – Lord Hampton
- Games That Lovers Play (1971) – Jonathan Chatterley
- Murder on the Orient Express (1974) – A.D.C.
- The Bawdy Adventures of Tom Jones (1976) – Lord Fellama
- Grace & Favour, Series 1, Episode 4 (1992) – Car driver
- 'Allo 'Allo! – Series 9 Episode 1 – Gone with the Windmill (1992) – German officer
- Benjamin Britten: Peace and Conflict (2013) – David Layton (final film role)
