= David Croft (TV producer) =

English writer, producer and director (1922–2011)

Major David Croft OBE
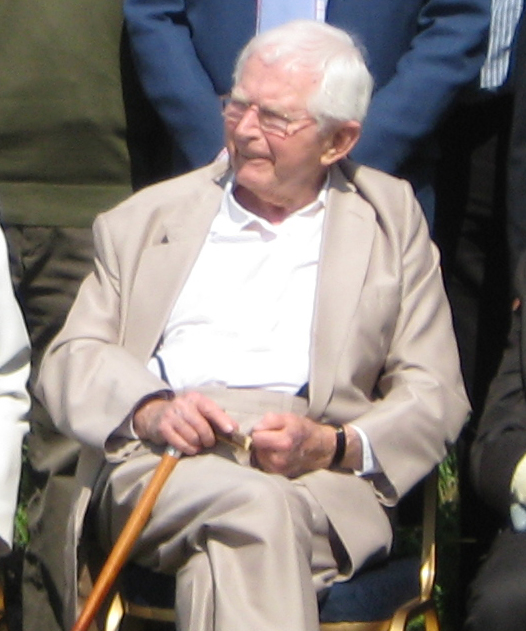
- Croft in May 2011
- Born: David John Andrew Sharland; 7 September 1922; Sandbanks, Poole, Dorset, England
- Died: 27 September 2011 (aged 89); Tavira, Portugal
- Other name: David John Croft
- Occupations: Writer; producer; director; actor
- Years active: 1939–2011
- Spouse: Ann Callender (m. 1952)
- Children: 7
- Relatives: Simon Cadell (son-in-law)
- Awards: British Comedy Awards; 2003 Lifetime Achievement Award; Writers' Guild of Great Britain; 1969 Best Comedy Script Dad's Army; 1970 Best Comedy Script Dad's Army; 1971 Best Comedy Script Dad's Army; Desmond Davies award (1981)
- Website: www.davidcroft.co.uk

Major David John Croft (born David John Andrew Sharland; 7 September 1922 – 27 September 2011) was an English television comedy screenwriter, television producer and director. He produced and wrote a string of BBC sitcoms with partners Jimmy Perry and Jeremy Lloyd, including Dad's Army, Are You Being Served?, It Ain't Half Hot Mum, Hi-de-Hi! and 'Allo 'Allo!

== Early life ==
Croft was born into a show business family: his father, Reginald Sharland (1886–1944), had a successful career as a radio actor in Hollywood, and his mother, Annie Croft (1896–1959), was a famous stage actress who had starred in the 1927 silent film On With The Dance, she was also the first woman to own a West End theatre company. His first public appearance was at the age of seven, when he was seen in a commercial which aired in cinemas. After that, his acting career in films "began and ended" with his uncredited appearance as Perkins in the film Goodbye, Mr. Chips (1939).

The family lived in Poole, Dorset. Nearby is St Aldhelm's Church, Poole and Croft later gave that name to the church in Dad's Army. He was educated at two independent schools, St John's Wood prep school in North London, followed by Rugby School in Warwickshire.

== Military service ==
He enlisted in the Royal Artillery in 1942. He served during the Second World War in North Africa, India and Singapore. After contracting rheumatic fever in North Africa, was sent home to convalesce and then underwent officer training at the Royal Military College, Sandhurst.

Croft was posted to India, arriving as the war in Europe ended, and was assigned to the Essex Regiment, rising to the rank of Major. When his military service ended he began working in the entertainment industry, as an actor, singer and writer.

== Career ==
Croft met Freddie Carpenter, who produced many pantomimes for Howard & Wyndham across the UK, resulting in Croft writing scripts such as Aladdin, Cinderella and Babes in the Wood. Through his lifelong friend, composer/conductor Cyril Ornadel, Croft met the producer Fiona Bentley, who had obtained rights to adapt and musicalise a number of Beatrix Potter stories. Croft wrote the scripts and lyrics for a series released on the Children's Record Company, a label of EMI, narrated by Vivien Leigh and starring several singer-actors and actresses including Barbara Brown, Graham Stark and Cicely Courtneidge. David Croft himself played a number of roles, including Timmy Willie in Johnny Town-Mouse, Kep in Jemima Puddle-Duck, and Old Brown in Squirrel Nutkin.

Croft relocated to the Northeast of England to work at Tyne Tees Television, where he produced many editions of the variety show The One O'Clock Show. For Tyne Tees, Croft also directed and produced the admags Ned's Shed and Mary Goes to Market, as well as producing his first sitcom, Under New Management, set in a derelict pub in the North of England.

After leaving Tyne Tees Television to work at the BBC in the mid-1960s, he produced several of the Corporation's sitcoms such as Beggar My Neighbour, A World of His Own, Further Up Pompeii! and Hugh and I. It was while producing Hugh and I that he was introduced to actor Jimmy Perry, who handed him an unsolicited script for a pilot called The Fighting Tigers about the British Home Guard during the Second World War. Croft liked the idea. The two men co-wrote nine series of the show, which was retitled Dad's Army, as well as a feature film and a stage show based on it.

While Dad's Army was still running, Croft began to co-write Are You Being Served? with Jeremy Lloyd. He was to continue both writing partnerships for the rest of his career in several hit series including It Ain't Half Hot Mum, Hi-de-Hi! and You Rang, M'Lord? (with Perry) and 'Allo 'Allo! (with Lloyd). His last full series Oh, Doctor Beeching!, broadcast from 1995 to 1997, was co-written with Richard Spendlove. He created a television pilot in 2007, entitled Here Comes The Queen, with Jeremy Lloyd. This starred Wendy Richard and Les Dennis, but the show was not continued as a series. Of these, It Ain't Half Hot Mum "was David’s and my favourite", Jimmy Perry told journalist Neil Clark for a Daily Telegraph article in 2013.

As a producer, Croft's regular practice was to signal the end of an episode with the caption "You have been watching ...", followed by shots of the main cast.

In 2004, he published his autobiography, You Have Been Watching with publisher BBC Books.

== Personal life ==
Croft married theatrical agent Ann Callender on 2 June 1952; the couple had seven children and sixteen grandchildren. In 1986, one daughter, Rebecca, married Simon Cadell, a star of Croft's comedy Hi-de-Hi!.

Croft was the subject of This Is Your Life on 20 December 1995, when he was surprised by Michael Aspel outside BBC Television Centre.

David Croft died in his sleep at his home in Portugal on 27 September 2011. He was 89 years old. His widow Ann died on 11 June 2016.

== Awards and honours ==
Croft became an Officer of The Most Excellent Order of the British Empire with Jimmy Perry in 1978 for services to television. He also received the 1981 Desmond Davis award from the British Academy of Film and Television Arts, for his outstanding contributions to the industry.

Croft's awards include:

- (BAFTA awards): Best Light Entertainment
  Nominated: 1970 Dad's Army
  Best Light Entertainment Production
  1971 Dad's Army (With Team)
  Nominated: 1971 Up Pompeii!
  Best Situation Comedy Series
  Nominated: 1973 Dad's Army
  Nominated: 1974 Dad's Army
  Best Situation Comedy
  Nominated: 1975 Dad's Army
  Nominated: 1977 Are You Being Served?
  Desmond Davis Award
  1982 Lifetime Achievement Award
  Best Comedy Series
  Nominated: 1982 Hi-de-Hi!
  Nominated: 1983 Hi-de-Hi!
  Nominated: 1985 Hi-de-Hi!
  Nominated: 1986 'Allo 'Allo!
  Nominated: 1987 'Allo 'Allo!
  Nominated: 1988 'Allo 'Allo!
  Nominated: 1989 'Allo 'Allo!
- (British Comedy Awards): 2003 Lifetime Achievement Award
  Writers' Guild of Great Britain
  1969 Best Comedy Script Dad's Army
  1970 Best Comedy Script Dad's Army
  1971 Best Comedy Script Dad's Army

== Production and writing career ==
In addition to writing most of the episodes for these television series, Croft also worked as producer, director and, later, executive producer.

=== Producer ===
- 1962–1967 Hugh and I
- 1967 Beggar My Neighbour

=== Written with Jimmy Perry ===
- 1968–1977 Dad's Army
- 1974–1981 It Ain't Half Hot Mum
- 1980–1988 Hi-de-Hi!
- 1988–1993 You Rang, M'Lord?

=== Written with Jeremy Lloyd ===
- 1972–1985 Are You Being Served? (Series 1-8)
- 1977–1978 Come Back Mrs. Noah
- 1980 Oh Happy Band!
- 1982–1992 'Allo 'Allo! (Series 1–6)
- 1992–1993 Grace & Favour
- 1994 Which Way to the War
- 2007 Here Comes the Queen

=== Written with Richard Spendlove ===
- 1995–1997 Oh, Doctor Beeching!

=== Written by himself ===
- 1972 Birds in the Bush

=== Sitcom timeline ===
Sitcom	1960's		1970'S										1980'S										1990'S							
Sitcom	68	69	70	71	72	73	74	75	76	77	78	79	80	81	82	83	84	85	86	87	88	89	90	91	92	93	94	95	96	97
Dad's Army	check	check	check	check	check	check	check	check	check	check	–																			
Are You Being Served?	–				check	check	check	check	check	check	check	check	–	check	–	check	–	check	–											
It Ain't Half Hot Mum	–						check	check	check	check	check	–	check	check	–															
Come Back Mrs. Noah	–									check	check	–																		
Hi-de-Hi!	–												check	check	check	check	check	check	check	check	check	–								
Oh Happy Band!	–												check	–																
'Allo 'Allo!	–														check	–	check	check	check	check	check	check	–	check	check	–				
You Rang, M'Lord?	–																				check	–	check	check	–	check	–			
Grace & Favour	–																								check	check	–			
Which Way to the War	–																										check	–		
Oh, Doctor Beeching!	–																											check	check	check

== Bibliography ==
- Morgan-Russell, Simon (2004). Jimmy Perry and David Croft. Manchester: Manchester University Press. ISBN 0-7190-6556-9.
