= Nelson's Column (TV series) =

- Genre: Sitcom
- Created by: Susan Belbin
- Written by: Paul Mayhew-Archer
- Directed by: Susan Belbin; Nick Wood
- Starring: John Gordon-Sinclair; Elizabeth Counsell; Sophie Thompson; Steven O'Donnell; Camille Coduri
- Country of origin: United Kingdom
- Original language: English
- No. of series: 2
- No. of episodes: 12

Production
- Running time: 30 minutes

Original release
- Network: BBC1
- Release: 17 February 1994 – 31 July 1995

Nelson's Column is a British comedy television series first broadcast between 17 February 1994 and 31 July 1995.
