= Rosalind March =

British TV, film and stage actress

Rosalind March is a British TV, film and stage actress.

Born in Ebbw Vale, Blaenau Gwent, March began her career in 1979, when she played Madge in several episodes of the series The Dick Francis Thriller: The Racing Game. Throughout the '80s she mainly did comedy. She appeared in episodes of Victoria Wood As Seen On TV (1985–1986) and worked with Wood again in Victoria Wood. She was regular Amanda in Life Without George with Simon Cadell, Michael Thomas and Carol Royle, also appeared in The Upper Hand, Nelson's Column.

During the 1990s, March played a host of roles in numerous television dramas, Close Relations, Goodbye Cruel World, Peak Practice, Seekers, The Bill, Inspector Morse, A Touch of Frost, Oliver Twist (1999) and Wilderness(1996). She also was a regular leading soap character, Liz Kemp, in the series London Bridge for Carlton, spanning nearly two years.

From 2000, onwards March featured in many more British television series and TV films like Top Buzzer, Men Only, Swallow, Agatha Christie’s Poirot: “Evil Under The Sun” as Mrs Castle, The Second Coming, Holby City, Doctors, Nicholas Nickleby, Heartbeat, Rosemary and Thyme, Class of '76, Ahead of the Class, Zip and Hollow, New Tricks, Call The Midwife and Eternal Law. She has also starred in several major films: East Is East in 1999, Calendar Girls, 2003 and Flawless with Demi Moore and Michael Caine 2007.

Stage work includes, Dear Daddy the Ambassadors Theatre, Olivier award for best play, Ooh La La, Hull Truck at the Bush, Mill Fire at the Bush, View From the Bridge, York Theatre Royal, tours of Rebecca and The Real Thing, Suspension, at the Bristol Old Vic.

In 2015, March appeared as Liz Grey in the ITV series Midsomer Murders episode 17.3 "The Ballad of Midsomer County". In 2020 she had a role in the film Denmark. Then in December 2023, she appeared in the BBC soap opera Doctors as Jean Bennett.
