= Hammer House of Mystery and Suspense =

1984 British mystery television series

- Genre: Mystery
- Country of origin: United Kingdom
- No. of series: 1
- No. of episodes: 13

Production
- Producers: Hammer Film Productions; 20th Century Fox Television
- Running time: 70-74 minutes

Original release
- Network: ITV
- Release: 5 September – 17 December 1984

Hammer House of Mystery and Suspense, aired in the United States as Fox Mystery Theater, is a British mystery anthology television series produced in Britain in 1984 by Hammer Film Productions. Though similar in format to the 1980 series Hammer House of Horror, the Mystery and Suspense series had feature-length episodes, usually running around 70 minutes without commercials.

The series was a co-production by Hammer Film Productions with 20th Century Fox Television (as was the 1968 anthology series Journey to the Unknown). It was first aired in the UK by ITV in 1984, though it was shown in different timeslots (and a different running order) throughout the various ITV regions. The Hammer House of Mystery and Suspense series was the last production undertaken by the Hammer film company.

== Episodes ==
Title	UK Transmission Date (ITV London region)	Written by	Directed by	Cast
1. Mark of the Devil	5 September 1984	Brian Clemens	Val Guest	Dirk Benedict, Jenny Seagrove, George Sewell, John Paul, Tom Adams, Burt Kwouk, James Ellis, Reginald Marsh, Alibe Parsons, Hugh Morton, Robert Lee, Roger Milner
2. Last Video and Testament	12 September 1984	Robert Quigley (story); Roy Russell (screenplay)	Peter Sasdy	Deborah Raffin, Oliver Tobias, David Langton, Clifford Rose, Shane Rimmer, Robert Rietti, Norman Mitchell
3. Child's Play	8 October 1984	Graham Wassell	Val Guest	Mary Crosby, Nicholas Clay
4. The Corvini Inheritance	15 October 1984	David Fisher	Gabrielle Beaumont	David McCallum, Jan Francis, Terence Alexander, Stephen Yardley, Paul Bacon, Leonard Trolley, Johnnie Wade
5. In Possession	22 October 1984	Michael J. Bird	Val Guest	Carol Lynley, Christopher Cazenove, Judy Loe, David Healy, Bernard Kay, Brendan Price, John D. Collins
6. Paint Me A Murder	29 October 1984	Pat Silver & Jesse Lasky Jr.	Alan Cooke	Michelle Phillips, James Laurenson, David Robb, Alan Lake, W. Morgan Sheppard, Richard LeParmentier, Tony Steedman, Gerald Sim, Neil Morrissey
7. A Distant Scream	5 November 1984	Martin Worth	John Hough	David Carradine, Stephanie Beacham, Stephen Greif, Stephan Chase, Fanny Carby, Ewan Stewart, Lesley Dunlop, Bernard Horsfall, Edward Peel
8. Black Carrion	12 November 1984	Don Houghton	John Hough	Season Hubley, Leigh Lawson, Norman Bird, William Hootkins, Oscar Quitak, Forbes Collins, Christopher Ellison
9. The Late Nancy Irving	26 November 1984	David Fisher	Peter Sasdy	Cristina Raines, Marius Goring, Simon Williams, Tony Anholt, Zienia Merton, Tom Chadbon, Michael Elwyn, Derek Benfield, Lewis Fiander
10. Czech Mate	3 December 1984	Jeremy Burnham	John Hough	Susan George, Patrick Mower, Roy Boyd, Richard Heffer, Peter Vaughan, Robert Russell, Pam St. Clement, Christopher Robbie, Steve Plytas, Hana Maria Pravda
11. The Sweet Scent of Death	17 December 1984 (London region transmission date unknown, but screened on ITV's Television South West on 17 December 1984.)	Brian Clemens	Peter Sasdy	Dean Stockwell, Shirley Knight, Michael Gothard, Carmen du Sautoy, Robert Lang, Alan Gifford
12. And the Wall Came Tumbling Down	4 July 1985	John Peacock & Dennis Spooner	Paul Annett	Barbi Benton, Gareth Hunt, Peter Wyngarde, Carol Royle, Brian Deacon, Patricia Hayes, Ralph Michael, Robert James, Ray Armstrong
13. Tennis Court	27 June 1985	Michael Hastings (story); Andrew Sinclair (screenplay)	Cyril Frankel	Peter Graves, Hannah Gordon, Ralph Arliss, Isla Blair, Jonathan Newth, Cyril Shaps, Peggy Sinclair, Marcus Gilbert

Two of the episodes, "A Distant Scream" and "In Possession", were remakes of stories that had been made for the fourth season of the BBC anthology series Out of the Unknown, originally titled "The Last Witness" and "The Uninvited". The master videotapes for both of the original teleplays were wiped by the corporation during the 1970s and no copies are known to exist, leaving only still photographs, a short video clip of "The Last Witness" and a complete audio recording of "The Uninvited" surviving. "A Distant Scream" and "In Possession" are effectively the only way these two stories can be viewed in a full audio-visual format.

== Production ==
The series was a joint production between Hammer Film Productions and 20th Century Fox Television which came about due to the strength of Hammer's name and Fox feeling the company's reputation and legacy would guarantee the series a place in primetime viewing. The series was shot on location in England. Roy Skeggs had wanted the series to keep the hour-long format of their previous series Hammer House of Horror, but Fox on the suggestion of their marketing and sales division felt that 13 feature length episodes would be more fitting with the Hammer name. Skeggs attempted to salvage some remaining scripts from Hammer House of Horror for usage in the series, but due to the series highlighting mystery and thriller genres over the horror stories from their last series, it was felt none of the leftover scripts would be suitable for usage without removing their intrinsic qualities forcing the producers to start from scratch. In order to achieve international appeal, the series always included at least one American actor per episode. The series didn't attract major attention from television markets in either the United States or the United Kingdom and while Fox had an option for 26 additional episodes, none were ultimately made.

== Home media ==
The series was released as a six-DVD set in the UK in 2005, but is currently out of print. In Germany, a four-DVD set was released in March 2018 under the title Vorsicht, Hochspannung!, which has 11 "main feature" episodes with a choice of either dubbed German language audio or the original English language audio, along with 2 "bonus episodes" with just the original English language audio.
