= Primi Townsend =

British actress

- Occupation: Actor
- Years active: 1970-

Primi Townsend is a British actress. She was a cast member on the sitcom Lame Ducks (1984) and is notable for her role as Mula, alongside Tom Baker in Doctor Who the 4 episode serial The Pirate Planet (1978).

Other credits include: Schizo (1976), Z-Cars (1978), Minder (1984), 1990 (1978), Blake's 7 (1980), and Bergerac (1984).

She also appeared recounting her appearance in Doctor Who in a documentary on the season 16 story The Pirate Planet (2007).

== Television ==
Dates	Title	Character
1978	Doctor Who serial "The Pirate Planet"	Mula (4 episodes)
1978	1990 (TV series)	
1980	Blake's 7	Zee
1981	World's End	Nicola (12 episodes)
1981	Life Without George	Natasha
1982	Crown Court	WPC Downs
1984	Lame Ducks	Mrs Drake (3 episodes)
1984	Bergerac	Linda O' Dell
1984	Minder	Sharon
1988	EastEnders	Counsellor's Receptionist
1991	Five Children and It	Miss George
1991	Grange Hill	Miss Brooking (2 episodes)
2009	Romany Rye (Play for Today)	Belle

== Film ==
Dates	Title	Character
1982	Witness for The Prosecution	Diana
1976	Schizo	Secretary
