= Francis Cadell =

Francis Cadell may refer to:

- Francis Cadell (explorer) (1822–1879), Scottish explorer and riverboat pioneer in Australia
- Francis Cadell (artist) (1883–1937), Scottish artist
