= Life Without George =

Television series

- Genre: Sitcom
- Created by: Penny Croft
- Country of origin: United Kingdom
- Original language: English
- No. of series: 3
- No. of episodes: 20

Production
- Executive producer: Robin Nash
- Producer: Susan Belbin

Original release
- Network: BBC1
- Release: 12 March 1987 – 4 May 1989

Life Without George is a BBC comedy series created and written by Penny Croft (Val Hudson also wrote part of some episodes). The executive producer was Robin Nash and its producer was Susan Belbin. Starring Carol Royle and Simon Cadell, it centred on a young woman's struggle to adapt to life after being left by her partner, George. The series ran from 12 March 1987 to 4 May 1989. The theme tune was written and performed by Penny Croft.

== Cast ==
- Jenny Russell – Carol Royle (Episodes 1–20)
- Larry Wade – Simon Cadell (Episodes 1–20)
- Mr Chambers – Ronald Fraser (Episodes 1–2,4–20)
- Amanda – Rosalind March (Episodes 1–13) Elizabeth Estensen (Episodes 14–20)
- Ben – Michael Thomas (Episodes 1–20)
- Sammy – Kenny Ireland (Episodes 1–6) Campbell Morrison (Episodes 7,9–20)
- Carol – Cheryl Maiker (Episodes 1, 4–20)
- Alison – Ann Thornton (Episodes 2,9)
- Dolores – Camille Coduri (Episode 4)
- Barbara – Susan Crowly (Episode 4)
- Alan – Aaran Harris (Episode 4)
- David Knight – Harold Innocent (Episodes 10,11)
- Gerald – Barry Woolgar (Episode 12, 13)
- Josephine – Selina Cadell (Episode 14–20)

== Screenings ==
Life Without George was originally screened on BBC1 in the UK between 1987 and 1989. Each of the three series ran from March, with episodes released once a week; series 1 and 2 had six episodes each, series 3 had eight episodes. In the UK the entire show was repeated on UK GOLD twice weekly with a Tuesday night showing at 10.30pm and one around 11pm on Sundays.
