= The Outsider (1983 TV series) =

- Written by: Michael J. Bird
- Directed by: Roger Cheveley; Frank W. Smith
- Starring: John Duttine
- Theme music composer: Alan Hawkshaw
- Country of origin: United Kingdom
- Original language: English
- No. of series: 1
- No. of episodes: 6

Production
- Executive producer: David Cunliffe
- Producer: Michael Glynn
- Running time: 60 minutes
- Production company: Yorkshire Television

Original release
- Network: ITV
- Release: 30 September – 4 November 1983

The Outsider is a British television drama series produced by Yorkshire Television and screened on the ITV in late 1983.

== Plot ==
Successful journalist Frank Scully (John Duttine) is visiting old friends, the Harpers (Joanna Dunham and Norman Eshley), in the Yorkshire country town of Micklethorpe. Deciding to stay on, he takes the job of editor of the local newspaper, the Messenger. Fiona Neave (Carol Royle), who runs the local print works, becomes Scully's love interest, as he soon becomes embroiled in local affairs.

== Background ==
The Outsider was the brainchild of writer Michael J. Bird, who researched the series by visiting Jim McTaggart, the editor of the Teesdale Mercury newspaper in County Durham. The series was commissioned by David Cunliffe, who had previously worked with Bird on the BBC drama series The Lotus Eaters, at Yorkshire Television for a run of six episodes. The Leeds YTV studio was used for interior scenes, whilst on location, the North Yorkshire town of Knaresborough doubled for the fictional Micklethorpe.

A paperback novelisation by Hugh Miller was published by Granada to tie in with the transmission of the series.

Plans for a second series of The Outsider were abandoned due to the lead actor John Duttine being unavailable, having signed with the BBC to star in the sitcom Lame Ducks.

== Cast ==
- John Duttine as Frank Scully
- Carol Royle as Fiona Neave
- Joanna Dunham as Sylvia Harper
- Norman Eshley as Donald Harper
- Peter Clay as Lord Wrathdale
- Elizabeth Bennett as Lady Wrathdale
- Pauline Letts as Miss. Banner
- Michael Sheard as Reuben Flaxman
- Ted Morris as Ted Holliday

== Episodes ==
No.	Title	Directed by	Written by	Original release date
1	"A Death in the Family"	Roger Cheveley	Michael J. Bird	30 September 1983
Journalist Frank Scully is visiting old friends, Sylvia and Donald Harper, in Yorkshire and becomes involved in local matters. Guest cast: Geoffrey Banks (Dr. Collett), David Ross (Ted Bishop), Peter Ellis (Jack Stoddart)
2	"The Legacy"	Frank W. Smith	Michael J. Bird	7 October 1983
Fiona Neave is the subject of gossip when she receives a large inheritance. Guest cast: Stanley Page (Oliver Prescott), Peter Martin (Man in Pub), David Fleeshman (Jack Dyson)
3	"A Question of Judgement"	Roger Cheveley	Michael J. Bird	14 October 1983
The Messenger's new column makes waves in Micklethorpe. Guest cast: W. Morgan Sheppard (Jack Jefford), Rosalie Williams (Irene Jefford), Richard Warner (Alan Metcalfe), William Ilkley (David Gibbs)
4	"Vacant Possession"	Frank W. Smith	Michael J. Bird	21 October 1983
Fiona comes across some disturbing photographs and confides in Scully. Guest cast: James Tomlinson (Arthur Fowler)
5	"The Homecoming"	Roger Cheveley	Michael J. Bird	28 October 1983
Lord Wrathdale receives a visit from his eccentric mother. Guest cast: Joan Hickson (Lillian), Mark Colleano (Sergio), David Ross (Ted Bishop), Gerry Cowan (Councillor Mayhew), Tom Harrison (Roy Sumner)
6	"Wound for Wound"	Frank W. Smith	Michael J. Bird	4 November 1983
Sylvia Harper lays down the law to Scully.
