= Lame duck (disambiguation) =

A lame duck is an elected official who is approaching the end of their tenure, and especially an official whose successor has already been elected.

Lame duck may also refer to:

- Lame duck session, in the United States Congress, a legislative session that takes place after an election but before newly elected members are seated
- Lame Ducks, a British sitcom
- Brain Donors, a 1992 film known in development as Lame Ducks

== See also ==
- Lame Duck Amendment, an informal name for the Twentieth Amendment to the United States Constitution
