= Selina Cadell =

English actress

- Born: Selina Jane Cadell; 12 August 1953 (age 73); London, England
- Education: Royal Central School of Speech and Drama
- Occupation: Actress
- Years active: 1977–present
- Spouse: Michael Thomas (m. 1985; died 2019)
- Children: Edwin Thomas; Letty Thomas
- Relatives: Simon Cadell (brother); Jean Cadell (grandmother); Francis Cadell (great uncle); Guy Siner (cousin)

Selina Jane Cadell (born 12 August 1953) is an English actress, best known for playing Sally Tishell in the long-running ITV medical dramedy Doc Martin. She is the younger sister of actor Simon Cadell and granddaughter of actress Jean Cadell. She is the great niece of the Scottish artist Francis Cadell.

== Biography ==
Cadell was born in London. She has been appearing on British television, film and theatre over the past forty years. She has taken on a wide range of supporting and leading roles. In 1985, she appeared in Agatha Christie's Miss Marple 'A Pocket Full of Rye' as Mary Dove, also in the TV series Victoria Wood in 1989, Jeeves and Wooster in 1993, Pie in the Sky (S2:E5 "Dead Right") in 1995, and Midsomer Murders 'The Killings at Badger's Drift' in 1997 (as Phyllis Cadel). She played Caroline Sheppard in the 2000 Agatha Christie's Poirot:The Murder of Roger Ackroyd. She also appeared in The Catherine Tate Show in 2006 and as Eleanor Crouch in Midsomer Murders' 'Midsomer Life' in 2008. Since then, she has played Dorothy Crowther in The Amazing Mrs Pritchard; was part of the main cast of the critically acclaimed and long-running Doc Martin; and the Dean Mieke Miedema in Lab Rats. She appeared in Sam Mendes' BAM production of Anton Chekhov's The Cherry Orchard, and played Maria in Mendes' highly acclaimed production of Twelfth Night for the Donmar Warehouse (London and New York). She also lent her voice to Jemima Puddle Duck's sister-in-law, Rebecca Puddle Duck, in the British children's animated series The World of Peter Rabbit and Friends for the BBC and Fuji Television Network.

Her film career has included roles in Not Quite Paradise (1985), Prick Up Your Ears (1987), The Madness of King George (1994), Mrs. Dalloway (1997), Mrs Caldicot's Cabbage War (2002), Match Point (2005) and Snow Cake (2006).

In 2015, she directed the Royal Shakespeare Company's first production of Love for Love by William Congreve.

In 2009's "Allegory of Love", S3:E1 of Lewis, she played Professor Bernice "Bernie" Rutherford. She played Pamela Bennett in "Among the Few", a 2004 episode of Foyle's War. In 2012, she briefly appeared in the remake of Gambit. In 2013, she appeared as Sister Gregory, a Roman Catholic nun, in the Father Brown episode "The Bride of Christ". She played the title role as the vanishing lady herself, Miss Froy, the character previously played by May Whitty and Angela Lansbury in the previous two versions, in the 2013 TV film The Lady Vanishes from the BBC, directed by Diarmuid Lawrence from an updated screenplay by Fiona Seres. She appeared as Professor Alice Sandwell in New Tricks episode "Buried Treasure" (S4:E6). In 2019, Cadell appeared in the Acorn TV series Queens of Mystery.

In 2017, Cadell revealed that the American actress Sigourney Weaver has been her good friend for more than 40 years. They appeared together onscreen when Weaver guest starred in Doc Martin.

In October 2019, Cadell was the guest on an episode of the BBC Radio 3 programme Private Passions. Cadell made a third appearance as Venetia Butts in Midsomer Murders 'Book of the Dead' (2023).
