= Where Has Poor Mickey Gone? =

1964 British film by Gerry Levy

- Theatrical release poster
- Directed by: Gerry Levy
- Written by: Gerry Levy (as Peter Marcus)
- Produced by: Gerry Levy
- Starring: Warren Mitchell; John Malcolm; Raymond Armstrong; John Challis; Christopher Robbie
- Edited by: Howard Lanning
- Production company: Ledeck Productions Ltd.
- Release date: 1964
- Running time: 60 minutes
- Country: United Kingdom
- Language: English

Where Has Poor Mickey Gone? is a 1964 second feature British horror film directed by Gerry Levy and starring Warren Mitchell, John Malcolm, Raymond Armstrong, John Challis and Christopher Robbie. It was written by Levy (as Peter Marcus). When harassed by a group of young thugs, a magician takes his revenge.

== Plot ==
Young tearaways Mick, Ginger and Tim, together with posh hanger-on Kip, are thrown out of a Soho jazz club for rowdy behaviour. Looking for more kicks, they first attack a courting couple, and then barge into the workshop of Emilio Dinelli, maker of fairground paraphernalia.

The youths terrorise and humiliate Dinelli. They play, then smash up, a football-themed pinball machine. Discovering that Dinelli used to be a stage magician, they force him to entertain them. He unveils his invisibility cabinet. One by one Kip, Ginger and Mick enter the cabinet and they each disappear. Tim panics and runs into the street, returning with the police, who do not believe his claim that his mates have simply vanished into thin air. Dinelli laughs as he shuts up his workshop and leaves. As the camera pans across the darkened empty workshop, we see the faces of the three missing boys on the paddles of the football game.

== Cast ==
- Warren Mitchell as Emilio Dinelli
- John Malcolm as Mick
- Raymond Armstrong as Ginger
- John Challis as Tim
- Christopher Robbie as Kip
- Karol Hagar as the girl
- Joseph Cook as the boy
- Vincent Shaw as first bouncer
- Tommy Eytle as second bouncer
- Philip Newman as first detective
- Kenneth Laird as second detective

== Music ==
The title song, which plays at the beginning and end of the film, was composed and sung by Ottilie Patterson, accompanied by Chris Barber (bass), Eddie Smith (banjo), Graham Burbidge (drums) and Sonny Boy Williamson (harmonica).

== Critical reception ==
The Monthly Film Bulletin wrote: "Mainly confined to one set and obviously economically made, this is a fairly successful attempt to do something different with the low-budget second feature. Although naive, and often technically unsure of itself, within its terms of reference it is quite intriguing and satisfying once it gets into its stride. The macabre final developments build up into a rare equivalent to what is inaccurately known as the ghost story, introducing an idea which is almost – but not quite – worthy of M. R. James. On the other hand, it is not difficult to detect the outcome fairly early on because the script itself, far from masking it, dwells on a significant detail too lengthily and heavily, besides introducing a give-away macabre touch too soon."

Variety said: "It lacks punch as an essay in the macabre. Its straggling script has some down-to-earth saltiness. Warren Mitchell ... gives a professional performance and John Malcolm as Mick, chief of the layabouts, is a podgy offbeat character who may do well as a character actor. But these are about all the bouquets that can be tossed to this misfire. Malcolm leads a little gang of streetcorner roughs and they set out in search of mischief. ...The film really starts when they break into the premises to find that it is the workshop of a stage magician who makes novelty sideshows for carnivals. Only Mitchell as the magician provides a performance that creates the intended atmosphere."

Neil Mitchell wrote for the BFI: "Where Has Poor Mickey Gone? is a genuinely oddball British B-movie. Initially released as the bottom half of a double bill with Paolo Heusch’s retitled 1961 Italian horror I Married a Werewolf, Levy’s tale of the supernatural plays out like an extended episode of Tales of the Unexpected. ... In this bizarre blend of juvenile delinquent movie and fantasy chiller, things go badly wrong for the proto-Droogs as Warren Mitchell’s magician, Emilio Dinelli, takes macabre revenge on the troublemakers. Bookended by Irish Blues singer Ottilie Patterson’s striking theme tune, Levy’s tale casts Soho as a dangerous, otherworldly location."

Critic Kim Newman wrote: "Mitchell, an all-purpose ethnic performer who specialised in playing older than his years, was months away from being cast as Alf Garnett, and goes the whole hog as the putupon, vengeful little man – it’s a shame Levy didn’t stretch to a more elaborate magic show revenge scene ... but perhaps the drab, small nature of the comeuppance is appropriate for the low-budget, low-rent feel of the whole thing."
