= Jean Cadell =

Scottish actress (1884–1967)

- Born: 13 September 1884; Edinburgh, Scotland
- Died: 29 September 1967 (aged 83); London, England
- Occupation: Actress
- Years active: 1912–1962
- Spouse: Perceval Perceval-Clarke
- Children: 1
- Relatives: Francis Cadell (brother)

Jean Dunlop Cadell (13 September 1884 – 29 September 1967) was a Scottish character actress. Although her married name was Jean Dunlop Perceval-Clark she retained her maiden name in the context of acting.

== Life and career ==
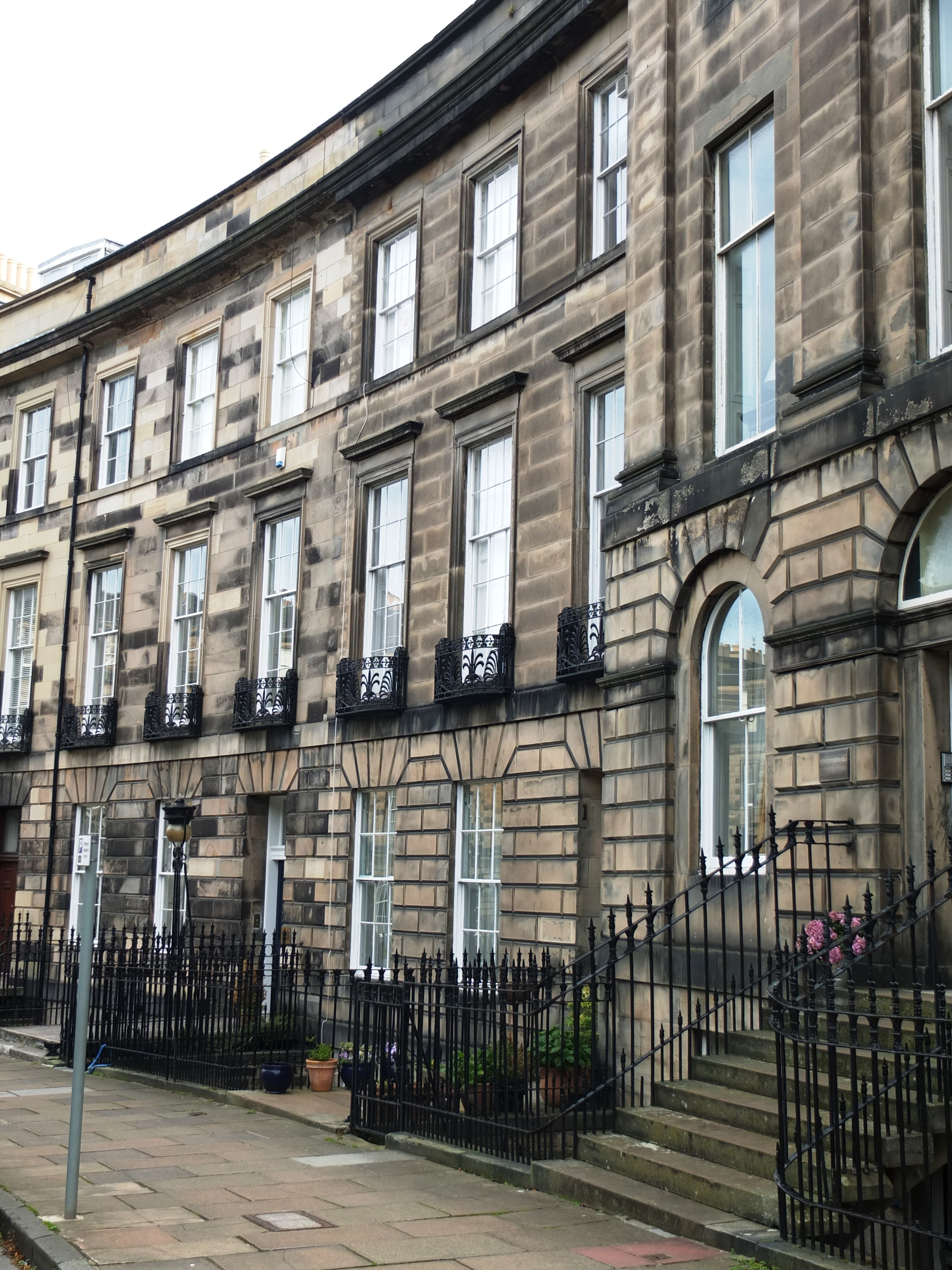
22 Ainslie Place

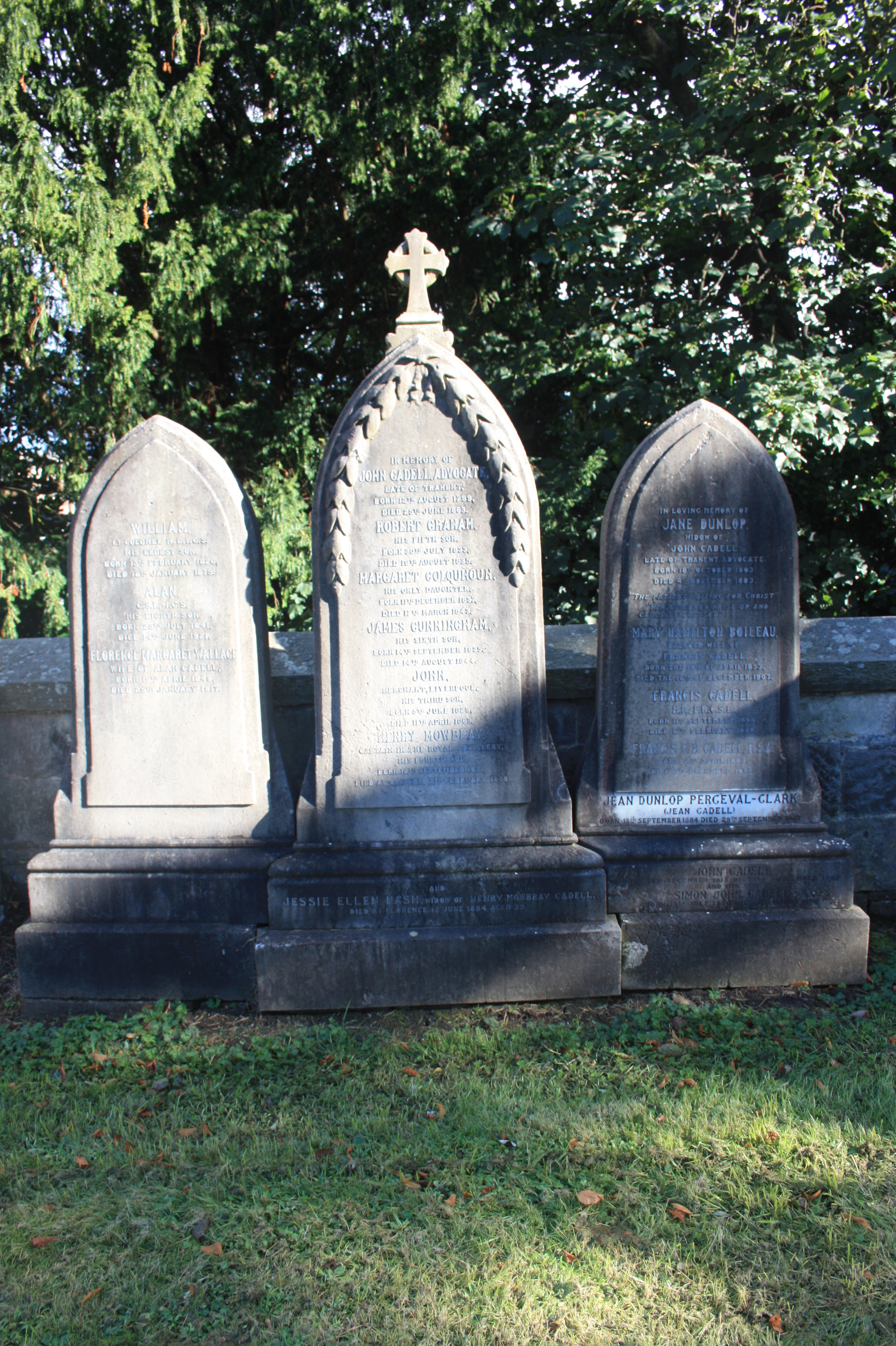
The grave of Jean Cadell, Dean Cemetery

She was born at 4 Buckingham Terrace in Edinburgh, the daughter of Dr Francis Cadell (1844-1909), a wealthy surgeon, and his wife, Mary Hamilton Boileau (1853-1907). The family moved to 22 Ainslie Place, a huge Georgian house on the Moray Estate, in her youth.

She performed in the cinema and on the stage. Among her best-known cinema roles was in the Ealing Studios comedy Whisky Galore! (1949), as well as Pygmalion (1938) and I Know Where I'm Going! (1945). She once performed opposite W.C. Fields in Hollywood, cast as Mrs. Micawber to his Wilkins Micawber in Metro-Goldwyn-Mayer's 1935 production of David Copperfield. Although Cadell remains in the released version of the film, her biggest scene (when the Micawber family prepare to emigrate) was deleted from the release prints.

In addition to numerous films, Cadell appeared on TV, including playing the Marquesa of Andalusia in the episode 'Prize of Andalusia' (1957) in the TV series 'The Buccaneers'.

Jean Cadell died in London on 29 September 1967, aged 83.

She is buried with her family in Dean Cemetery in western Edinburgh. The grave lies against the southern wall.

== Family ==
Her brother, Francis Cadell, was one of the Scottish Colourists. She married actor Perceval Perceval-Clark. Jean and Perceval both appeared in the play The Man Who Stayed at Home.

Her son, born John Cadell Perceval-Clark in 1915, changed his name to John Cadell and became a theatrical agent. Her grandson Simon Cadell and her granddaughter Selina Cadell also became actors.

== Complete filmography ==
- David Garrick (1912, Short) - Araminta Brown
- The Man Who Stayed at Home (1915) - Miss Myrtle
- Anna the Adventuress (1920) - Nellie Bates
- Alf's Button (1920) - Vicar's wife
- The Naked Man (1923) - Miss Linnett
- The Loves of Robert Burns (1930) - Mrs. Burns
- Escape (1930) - (uncredited)
- Two White Arms (1932) - Mrs. Drury
- Fires of Fate (1932) - Miss Byrne
- Timbuctoo (1933) - Wilhelmina
- The Luck of a Sailor (1934) - Princess Rosanna
- Little Friend (1934) - Miss Drew
- David Copperfield (1935) - Mrs. Micawber
- Whom the Gods Love (1936) - Frau Mozart
- Love from a Stranger (1937) - Aunt Lou
- South Riding (1938) - Miss Dry
- Tobias and the Angel (1938, TV Movie) - Anna
- Pygmalion (1938) - Mrs. Pearce
- Suspect (1939, TV Movie) - Goudie Macintyre
- Confidential Lady (1940) - Amy Boswell
- Quiet Wedding (1941) - Aunt Florence
- The Young Mr. Pitt (1942) - Mrs. Sparry
- Dear Octopus (1943) - Vicar's Wife
- Two Girls and a Sailor (1944) - Mrs. Church
- I Know Where I'm Going! (1945) - Postmistress
- Jassy (1947) - Meggie
- Afterglow (1948, TV Movie) - Frau Kaunitz
- That Dangerous Age (1949) - Nannie
- Marry Me! (1949) - Hester Parsons
- Whisky Galore! (1949) - Mrs. Campbell
- No Place for Jennifer (1950) - Aunt Jacqueline
- Madeleine (1950) - Mrs. Jenkins
- Craven House (1950, TV Movie) - Miss Hatt
- The Reluctant Widow (1950) - Mrs. Barrows
- The Switchback (1950, TV Movie) - Aunt Dinah
- The Late Edwina Black (1951) - Ellen
- Music at Night (1952, TV Movie) - Mrs. Amesbury
- I'm a Stranger (1952) - Hannah Mackenzie
- Three's Company (1953) - Miss Craig (segment "Take a Number' story)
- Meet Mr Lucifer (1953) - Mrs. Macdonald
- The Whiteoak Chronicles: The Building of Jalna (1955, TV Movie) - Adeline Whiteoak
- The Whiteoak Chronicles: Whiteoaks (1955, TV Movie) - Adeline Whiteoak
- Keep It Clean (1956) - Mrs. Edgar Anstey
- The Druid Circle (1957, TV Movie) - Mrs. White
- The Little Hut (1957) - Mrs. Hermione Brittingham-Brett
- Let's Be Happy (1957) - Mrs. Cathie (uncredited)
- The Surgeon's Knife (1957) - Henrietta Stevens
- Doomsday for Dyson (1959, TV Movie) - Great Aunt Lucy
- Rockets Galore! (1958) - Mrs. Campbell
- Serious Charge (1959) - Almshouse Matron
- Upstairs and Downstairs (1959) - 1st Old Lady
- A Taste of Money (1961) - Miss Brill
- Very Important Person (1961) - Lady Telling Story on TV show. Opening Scene
