= Enemy at the Door =

British television series (1978–1980)

- Genre: Drama
- Created by: Michael Chapman
- Written by: Robert Barr; John Brason; N.J. Crisp; James Doran; James Andrew Hall
- Starring: Alfred Burke; Simon Cadell; Bernard Horsfall; Richard Heffer; Simon Lack; John Malcolm; Emily Richard
- Theme music composer: Wilfred Josephs
- Country of origin: United Kingdom
- Original language: English
- No. of series: 2
- No. of episodes: 26

Production
- Running time: 60 minutes
- Production company: London Weekend Television

Original release
- Network: ITV
- Release: 21 January 1978 – 29 March 1980

Enemy at the Door is a British television drama series made by London Weekend Television for ITV. The series was shown between 1978 and 1980 and dealt with the German occupation of Guernsey, one of the Channel Islands, during the Second World War. The programme generated a certain amount of criticism in Guernsey, particularly for being obviously filmed on Jersey. The series also marked the television debut of Anthony Head as a member of the island resistance. The theme music was composed by Wilfred Josephs.

== Plot ==
The islanders were chiefly represented by the respected local doctor, Philip Martel, who struggled to maintain the peace, while the Germans were led by Major Dieter Richter, a peacetime academic who was inclined to be lenient on the Guernsey populace, but whose approach was challenged by his more conventionally nasty SS counterpart Hauptsturmführer Klaus Reinicke. Rounding out the principal German characters were Major Freidel and Oberleutnant Kluge, a former policeman, still more inclined to act as a policeman rather than a soldier.

ITV later described Enemy at the Door thus: "Not all the Germans were villains and not all the British were heroes". Many episodes portrayed the balance of power and fragile harmony between the islanders and the German occupying forces, and how it was threatened by either resistance action or over-zealous clamping down by the Germans.

A precursor to his role as Bergerac in the detective series set on Jersey, John Nettles played a police detective ordered to work for the Germans and anguished by the conflict between his duty and collaborating with the enemy.

The series's narrative ended in 1943, with the Germans still occupying the island.

== Cast ==
- Alfred Burke as Major Dieter Richter
- Bernard Horsfall as Dr Philip Martel
- Simon Cadell as Hauptsturmfuhrer Klaus Reinicke
- John Malcolm as Oberleutnant Kluge
- Simon Lack as Major Freidel
- David Waller as Major General Müller
- Richard Heffer as Peter Porteous
- Helen Shingler as Helen Porteous
- Antonia Pemberton as Olive Martel
- Emily Richard as Clare Martel

Simon Cadell, who played Hauptsturmfuhrer Klaus Reinicke, had already in 1976 played a German officer in the forces occupying the Channel Islands — in that case, as Dr Braun in a television adaptation of William Douglas-Home's play The Dame of Sark, set on Sark.

== Reception ==
The review on the Screenonline website by Sergio Angelini describes Enemy at the Door as featuring "stories and characters that explore the complex issues of alienation and wartime collaboration in a multi-faceted and surprisingly subtle fashion". However, "[W]hile striving for a sense of day-to-day reality, the series was shown well before the 9 o'clock watershed, consequently holding back from showing too much of the grim reality of the situation."

West Germany was among the countries that purchased Enemy at the Door for broadcast. The series was rebroadcast in the UK by Talking Pictures TV from September 2020 and on the same channel in May 2024.

== Series overview ==
Series	Episodes	Originally released	
Series	Episodes	First released	Last released
1	13	21 January 1978	15 April 1978
2	13	5 January 1980	29 March 1980

== Episode list ==
=== Series 1 (1978) ===
No	Title	Episode Summary	Original Airdate
1	By Order of the Führer	The first episode is set in June 1940, as the islanders of Guernsey await the German invasion following bombing raids. Dr Philip Martel is invited by John Ambrose on behalf of the bailiff to join a negotiating committee in anticipation of occupation, leading his daughter Clare to accuse him of collusion. After the Germans arrive Dr Martel and the committee face the invaders under Major Richter, who refuses to recognise the island as a demilitarised zone and puts it under martial rule. Clare's boyfriend Peter Porteous and local fisherman Peter Girard attempt to escape by boat but the Germans fire on them, killing the young fisherman. Peter Porteous escapes but the Germans are aware that somebody has tried to elude them.	21 January 1978
2	The Librarian	Hauptsmann Reinicke's call for reprisals in the wake of Peter's escape are rejected by Major Richter who wants to court local goodwill. Peter's mother tells Oberleutnant Kluge that Peter would never try to escape as he is her carer but Kluge is suspicious and purposely falls against Peter to prove that he has a wounded shoulder. Reinicke antagonises librarian Cecily Brown by placing several innocuous books on a banned list. They struggle over a book each wishes to keep hold of and the Nazi falls and cuts his head. Cecily is arrested and Richter agrees to let her go if she apologises to Reinicke but, despite Martel's urgings, she refuses on principle and is sentenced to two years in a French prison.	28 January 1978
3	After the Ball	Reinicke organises a dance for soldiers and local girls to attract good publicity. Anton Schen, a young Austrian, takes a shine to Marie Weston. But her widowed father, a lawyer who fought in World War I, has had his car requisitioned by the occupiers and does not want Marie to attend the dance. She nevertheless goes behind his back and dances with Anton but, on the way home, she fights off his advances and accuses him of rape. At his court-martial, Anton claims that Marie was willing, but despite some misgivings Richter finds him guilty and has him shot. Next morning Richter orders Reinicke to give Mr Weston his car back.	4 February 1978
4	Steel Hand from the Sea	Aware that it was Peter who tried to escape, Richter relays a message from his high command to Dr Martel to warn anybody hoping to follow his example that reprisals will be taken. Dr Martel's son Clive lands secretly on the island to spy out the German position, hiding with his old business partner Teddy Lupus. Martel's daughter Clare meets Willie Kessler, a Luftwaffe pilot, whose face was burned in an air strike. He is attracted to her and they become friends but when she goes to meet Clive and sees Kessler watching them she throws a stone at him, causing him to fall to his death and float away in the sea.	11 February 1978
5	The Laws and Usages of War	As Clare tells her parents what she did Kessler's body is found but it is assumed he died in an abortive raid on the island by the British led by Clive. There are many casualties and Dr Martel hands over the critically wounded Major Kirk to the Germans to save his life, whilst bringing food to Clive, who is in hiding. Bar keeper Fat Molly names fisherman Joe Le Beq as organising the raid, though she knows he is innocent, because she holds him responsible for her husband's death, and the Germans arrest him and threaten to shoot him. This flushes Clive out and he is sent to a POW camp. The handling of the situation, however, brings the enmity between Kluge and Reinicke to the surface.	18 February 1978
6	V for Victory	After cut-out blue paper V for Victory signs appear in library books, somebody takes to painting V signs on walls at night as well as lighting fires. Fifteen-year-old Billy Le Prevost is caught near one of the walls and arrested by Kluge, though he believes Billy is innocent of the graffiti and is sheltering somebody else. To ensure that Billy is truly considered to be innocent, Peter starts a fire whilst the boy is still held captive. Consequently, Kluge lets him go but tragedy awaits him.	25 February 1978
7	The Polish Affaire	Retired diplomat Sir James Prideaux resists Reinicke's efforts to make him divulge British government information. Prior to the war, Sir James's wife Diana had an affair with Polish military attaché Arciszewsky in Riga, which her husband knew about but kept quiet. The Pole is now a civilian prisoner on the island but escapes from his work camp and hides out with the Prideaux who enlist Dr Martel's help to get him to safety. However, Arciszewsky is discovered to have typhus and, before Reinicke can trap the Prideaux for assisting him, he kills himself.	4 March 1978
8	Officers of the Law	Kluge is anxious to clamp down on the island's black market activities and enlists the reluctant aid of local police sergeant Roy Lewis. There is a new drug called sulfanilamide which Dr Martel believes will save the life of seriously ill youngster Bobby Beauchamp but he is denied its use by the Germans and so turns to black marketeer Louis Mendoza. The men are caught, thanks to Lewis, but the policeman is surprised that Kluge is more humane than he had thought.	11 March 1978
9	The Jerrybag	On her father's death, Betty Ridge gets work as a cleaner for the Germans, meeting young soldier Erich, with whom she spends a romantic evening. At a dance, their association scandalises locals who taunt her as a "Jerrybag". When Betty falls pregnant, despite Erich's sincere wish to marry her, they are forbidden as such unions are not allowed. Erich is sent to the Russian front before the child is born and his death is reported. Betty feels he abandoned her and wants to give their baby son up for adoption but, after a sympathetic pep talk from Peter, she is proud to keep him despite local animosity.	18 March 1978
10	Treason	General Von Wittke comes to Guernsey, ostensibly to write a report on the Occupation. In fact he has come to see General Laidlaw, a retired British officer and the ex-husband of Von Wittke's sister, a German opera singer. Von Wittke and other generals are aware that Hitler is a lunatic who will ruin the country. They aim to depose him and Von Wittke asks Laidlaw to travel to London to broker a deal. A Gestapo officer arrives on the island, suspicious of Von Wittke's presence, but the general successfully convinces him that he had come to invite Laidlaw to Germany to make anti-British broadcasts and that Laidlaw had refused. The trip to London never happens.	25 March 1978
11	Pains and Penalties	Dr Martel arranges hospitalisation for frail old Mrs Bree who, with her son Edward, are rent-free tenants of Peter. However, they have had to move to an inadequately heated cottage after the Germans commandeered the farmhouse in which they used to live as a billet. In fact, the Germans want to demolish the cottage to make way for an arms dump and trick Peter into cleaning up a cesspool on his land in exchange for letting the Brees return to the farmhouse. However, after Mrs Bree dies, they charge Edward with stealing coal to keep the cottage warm and send him to prison.	1 April 1978
12	The Prussian Officer	Arrogant Prussian officer Major Von Bulow comes to the island and is billeted with Peter whilst he trains soldiers for the Russian front. He recognises Chantal, a French prostitute in the Germans' brothel as an old flame of Reinicke and, as he dislikes Reinicke, takes great delight in revealing her occupation, sending his batman Klinski to have sex with her. Reinicke is humiliated as planned but when a drunken Klinski, rejected by Chantal, kills her, he is also the chief suspect. He is exonerated but his reputation tarnished as Von Bulow leaves Guernsey.	8 April 1978
13	Judgement of Solomon	Richter gives Dr Martel permission to travel to France to get much needed medicines for the islanders. At the same time, Peter has secretly been photographing German ships at the local port, with a view to passing them to the French Resistance so that the Germans' strengths can be calculated. He and Clare put them in Martel's case but the Germans open it as he is leaving for France, with the result that the doctor and Peter are both sent to prison.	15 April 1978

=== Series 2 (1980) ===
No	Title	Episode Summary	Original Airdate
14	Call of the Dead	Hard line General Muller visits Richter and accuses him of leniency with Dr Martel and Peter after Reinicke reported him. Reinicke is promoted but so too is Richter. Once again Reinicke is made to feel out of step with the other German officers. Wracked with guilt over causing Peter's imprisonment and killing the Luftwaffe officer, Clare becomes depressed and Dr Forbes, standing in for her father, is unable to reach her. After she is arrested for trespassing on the beach where Willy died, Clare walks into the sea to drown herself.	5 January 1980
15	Reception for the General	Clare is pulled alive from the sea and taken home to recover, her court case for trespass postponed. She is delirious and Richter hears her murmur that she killed the Luftwaffe pilot but he keeps quiet about it. Müller wants to organise a reception, a propaganda exercise inviting local worthies to meet him, but the other Germans know that the islanders' antipathy to their occupiers would mean that nobody would turn up. It is left to Reinicke to tell him this. The Germans are mystified that meat is being stolen on a regular basis from their cold store. The culprit is reckless Captain Foster-Smythe, angry that his protests to the Nazis that the islanders are being deprived of food are unheeded, but he manages to elude them.	12 January 1980
16	Angels That Soar Above	Hauptmann Anders is accused of supposedly passing on details of troop movements to Marguerite, a local girl he befriended, and is suspended from duty. He pleads not guilty but his arrogant stance does not help. Ultimately, he admits guilt but Kluge believes he is lying, to spare the girl who merely guessed where the soldiers were headed. Dr Martel is released from prison, angry and shocked at what he has seen. He visits a distant Clare who is being cared for by nuns in a convent.	19 January 1980
17	No Quarter Given	Foster-Smythe continues to be a studied thorn in the Germans' sides, complaining that the confiscation of civilian radios is illegal. However, when a tip-off that he has hidden his own radio leads to a search of his house, Hoffman, one of Kluge's men who has an English wife and pro-British feelings, finds it but says nothing. Foster-Smythe is then told that his house is to be used as a billet but before this can take place his Nigerian housekeeper and lover, Lily, is deliberately run over and killed by drunken SS men. Richter and Kluge want a murder trial but are forced to back down when Reinicke threatens to report them to Berlin for showing anti-Aryan sympathies. The next day, Foster-Smythe burns his house down and escapes to England with Hoffman.	26 January 1980
18	Committee Man	John Ambrose asks Dr Martel to rejoin the controlling committee as a health officer but he demurs, not wanting the pressure. The Germans' market garden is sabotaged when their fuel is run off, making it impossible to water their produce. As a result, Hellmann, an overzealous member of Muller's staff, goes behind his back and rations the islanders' water supply. Ambrose protests but Richter tells him to get a medical opinion before he can consider reversing the decision and suggests he tries Martel again. As a consequence the doctor reluctantly rejoins the committee and gets the order withdrawn.	2 February 1980
19	Post Mortem	Released from prison, Peter confronts Teddy Lupus, accusing him of collaboration. The two men argue and fight. Teddy is found dead and Peter's prints are on a wrench. However, Peter claims that he only disarmed Lupus of the wrench, knocked him unconscious and left. He is still charged with murder but Kluge's investigations lead him to Heller, a German who sold stolen petrol to Lupus. Dr Martel conducts a post-mortem, which showed that Lupus actually died of a heart attack and the assailant who caused it is proved to be Heller, thus exonerating Peter.	9 February 1980
20	The Raid	The Germans have built a frequency detector on Sark to give early warning against British night bombers and Allied troops plan a raid to destroy it along with the electricity generator. A group lands in the guise of fishermen, enlisting the knowledge of local boy Jamie Robertson. When one of the commandos is wounded Jamie and his mother tend him but they are interrupted by Heinrich Kessel, a German soldier friendly with the Robertsons, and the British shoot him. The equipment is successfully destroyed with three of the party giving themselves up to let the others escape.	16 February 1980
21	Jealousy	Already jealous that, late in life, her brother Bill married the younger, German-born piano teacher Hertha, Marjory Clifford's resentment grows as she sees them befriend young officer Helmut Wolf, a piano student of Hertha's. She writes an anonymous letter, accusing Hertha of black market activities after she sells cigars Helmut gave her. No evidence is found but Richter, aware that Reinicke dislikes Helmut, sends him to the mainland to save him whilst Bill is interned, along with Hertha, after Marjory's meddling leads the Germans to discover that he was born in England, not Guernsey.	23 February 1980
22	War Game	Kluge decides to revive the inter-island chess tournament as a morale-boosting PR exercise despite misgivings by Richter and Dr Martel that a German victory would cause resentment among the islanders. When Reinicke uses dirty tricks to force the local chess master Arthur Gardner to withdraw from the final against former champion Muller to ensure a German propaganda win, Arthur's wife Louise takes his place and beats Muller. Muller is gracious in defeat but Richter is furious with Reinicke after Martel has exposed his dirty dealings.	1 March 1980
23	The Right Blood	Standartenführer Grunwald arrives on Guernsey, ostensibly to set up a concentration camp. However, he is the uncle of Eric, the illegitimate son of single mother Betty Ridge, who is struggling to make ends meet. Grunwald wants to take Eric to Germany to have a better life with the Grunwald family but Betty refuses. Although Grunwald respects her decision, Reinicke, anxious to worm his way in with the Standartenführer, tricks Betty into handing the child over.	8 March 1980
24	From a View to a Death	Russian slave prisoner Kiril Kamerovsky kills a German guard and escapes, being hidden by Jenny Glover and her family at great risk to themselves, calling in Dr Martel as Kiril has pneumonia. Kluge learns that Kiril's father is a high-ranking Russian general and that Kiril is well-read so he gets one of his men to follow Jenny when she goes to get him library books. The Glovers are arrested but Kiril has been moved to the Porteouses. Kiril is arrested on false papers and Reinicke, going behind Richter's back, tortures him to death before he can implicate the Glovers. Once more, Reinicke incurs Richter's wrath. If the truth gets out, it will give the Russians the excuse to similarly abuse German POWs.	15 March 1980
25	The Education of Nils Borg	Nils Borg, a journalist from neutral Sweden, arrives to see how the occupiers and the islanders coexist. He is accompanied by Trudi Engel from Goebbels's Ministry of Propaganda, who is keen that he only sees things favourable to the Germans. However, local journalist Jack Foster, who runs an underground newspaper reporting on the outside world, informs him of the deaths of slave workers on Alderney. Nils is fair-minded and anxious to publish his story from Stockholm but Trudi intercepts it and shows it to Reinicke. Consequently, Jack is jailed and Nils, his story confiscated, told that he will be expelled from Germany.	22 March 1980
26	Escape	Last-ever episode. After his farm has been repeatedly plundered by Germans, who killed his dog, Walter Nicolle confronts and kills the latest intruder. However, he is caught trying to bury the body. Peter, desperate to escape from Guernsey, agrees to leave a letter admitting to the killing in exchange for the use of Walter's boat but his escape is not as he had imagined.	29 March 1980
