= Guy Siner =

English-American actor (born 1947)

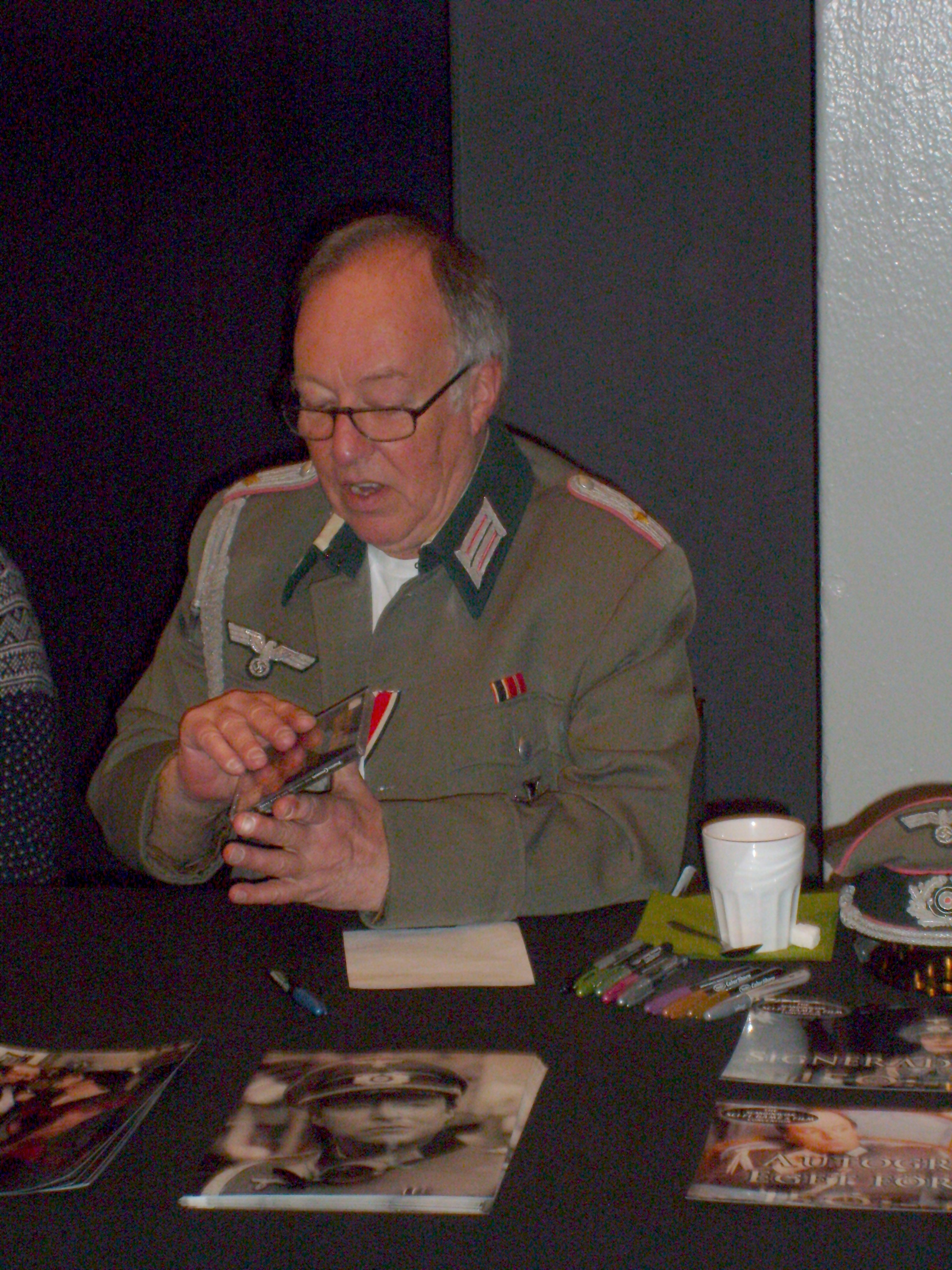
- Siner in November 2010
- Born: Guy Domville Siner; October 16, 1947 (age 78); New York City, U.S.
- Occupation: Actor
- Years active: 1972–present
- Relatives: Simon Cadell (cousin); Selina Cadell (cousin)
- Website: guysiner.com

Guy Domville Siner (born October 16, 1947) is an English-American actor best known for his role as Lieutenant Hubert Gruber in 'Allo 'Allo! and Dr. Mittenhand in Leprechaun 4: In Space (1996).

== Early life ==
Guy Domville Siner was born in New York City on October 16, 1947, the son of an English mother from Bexhill-on-Sea and an American father from Manhattan. He is a cousin of English actors Simon and Selina Cadell. His mother wanted him to be educated in England, so the family settled there when he was five years old. After attending St Edmund's School in Hindhead, he moved to London to receive training as an actor at the Webber Douglas Academy of Dramatic Art.

== Career ==
Siner's TV credits include Z Cars, Softly, Softly: Task Force, Doctor Who (Genesis of the Daleks), I, Claudius, Secret Army, You Rang, M'Lord?, 'Allo 'Allo!, The Brittas Empire, Seinfeld, Knots Landing: Back to the Cul-de-Sac, Babylon 5, Martial Law, Diagnosis: Murder, That's My Bush!, Star Trek: Enterprise, ChuckleVision, Family Tree and The Crown. Siner is one of ten actors to appear in both the Star Trek and Doctor Who franchises.

One of his early television roles was a 1979 episode of Secret Army, of which 'Allo 'Allo! was a parody. The episode was entitled "A Safe Place", with Siner appearing as a German Intelligence Officer.

In 1980, Siner portrayed director Mack Sennett in The Biograph Girl, a short-lived West End musical about the silent film era.

He was originally set to voice the villain Man Ray in the SpongeBob SquarePants season 2 episode "Mermaid Man and Barnacle Boy III", but was replaced by John Rhys-Davies.

In 2006, Siner appeared in two films by writer-director David Roden, Beginner's Please and The Resurrectionist. From June to July 2007, he reprised his role of Lieutenant Gruber in the stage play of 'Allo 'Allo!, for Twelfth Night Theatre in Brisbane, alongside Gorden Kaye and Sue Hodge, playing their original roles of René Artois and Mimi Labonq. The other characters were portrayed by various Australian actors, including Katy Manning, Steven Tandy and Jason Gann.

== Personal life ==
After 'Allo 'Allo! ended in 1992, Siner moved to Los Angeles. He later returned to England and settled in Chesham, where he was reportedly engaged to a local actress in 2004.

== Other ventures ==
Siner voiced several Star Wars video games:

- Star Wars: TIE Fighter (1994)
- Star Wars: Force Commander (2000)
- Star Wars: Galactic Battlegrounds (2001)
- Star Wars Jedi Knight II: Jedi Outcast (2002)

He worked as a script editor on two expanded universe Doctor Who stories in 2008.

== Filmography ==
Year	Title	Role	Notes
1975	Doctor Who	General Ravon	1 serial (Genesis of the Daleks)
1982-1992, 2007	'Allo 'Allo!	Lieutenant Hubert Gruber	All episodes
1995	Seinfeld	Mandel	1 episode, 'The Doodle'
1996	The Disappearance of Kevin Johnson	Fred Barratt	
1997	Lost Highway	Prison Official #1	
1997	Playing God	Dutch Businessman	
1997	Big City Blues	Dentist	
1997	Leprechaun 4: In Space	Dr. Mittenhand	Direct-to-video
2000	Return to the Secret Garden	Lord Craven	
2001	Megiddo: The Omega Code 2	British Leader	
2002	Bug	Maitre D'	
2002	Star Trek: Enterprise	Stuart Reed	
2003	Vlad	Ilie	
2003	Pirates of the Caribbean: The Curse of the Black Pearl	Harbormaster	
2005	The Second Front	Archer	
2006	Provoked	Prosecutor	
2011	Ironclad	Oaks	
2020	The Crown	Francis Pym	
2022	'Allo 'Allo! Forty Years of Laughter	Himself/Lieutenant Hubert Gruber	Documentary
2024	Rivals	Bishop Brenton	
2026	Agatha Christie's Seven Dials	Tredwell	Miniseries
