= Ottilie Patterson =

Northern Irish singer (1932–2011)

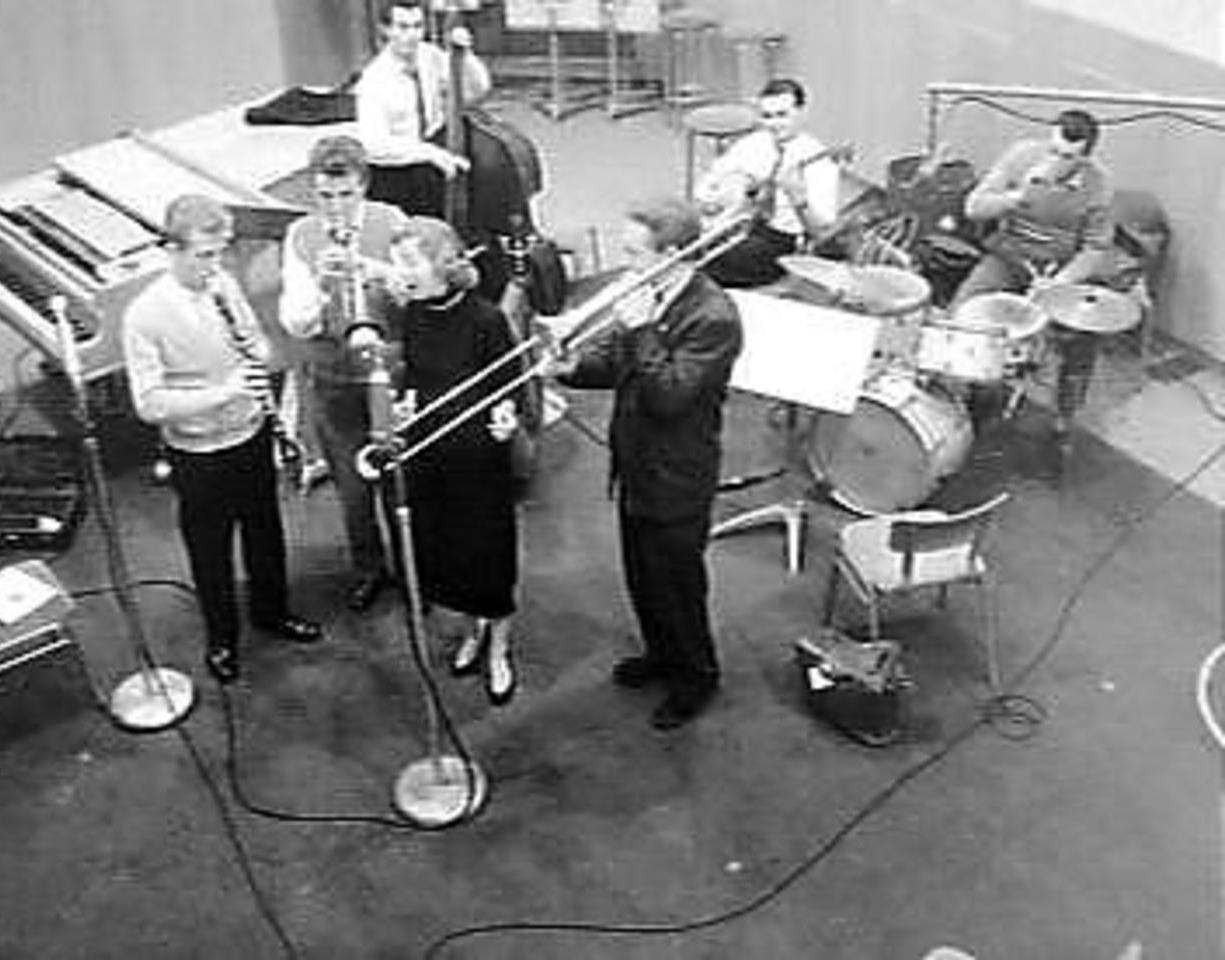
- Patterson with the Chris Barber Band, in the Netherlands, 1957

Background information
- Born: Anna Ottilie Patterson; 31 January 1932; Comber, County Down, Northern Ireland
- Died: 20 June 2011 (aged 79)
- Genres: Traditional jazz, blues
- Occupation: Singer
- Instruments: Piano, vocals
- Years active: 1955–1983
- Labels: Decca, Pye, Columbia

Anna Ottilie Patterson (31 January 1932 – 20 June 2011) was a Northern Irish blues singer best known for her performances and recordings with the Chris Barber Jazz Band in the late 1950s and early 1960s. She has been called the godmother of British blues and the greatest of all British blues singers, often surprising audiences with her large soulful voice and instinctive feeling for the genre.

== Biography ==
Anna Ottilie Patterson was born in Comber, County Down, Northern Ireland on 31 January 1932. She was the youngest child of four. Her father, Joseph Patterson, was from Northern Ireland, and her mother, Jūlija Jēgers, was from Latvia. They had met in Georgia while Joseph was serving in the British army in the Caucasus mountains. They were married in 1919. Ottilie's name is an Anglicised form of the Latvian name "Ottilja". Both sides of the family were musical, and Patterson trained as a classical pianist from the age of eleven. She never received any formal training as a singer but was captivated by the blues from the age of ten.

In 1949, Patterson went to study art at Belfast Art College where a fellow student introduced her to the music of Bessie Smith, Jelly Roll Morton and Meade Lux Lewis. In 1951 she began singing with Jimmy Compton's Jazz Band, and in August 1952 she formed the Muskrat Ramblers with Al Watt and Derek Martin. After graduating, she worked as an art teacher but found it unexciting. In the summer of 1954, while holidaying in London, Patterson met Beryl Bryden, who introduced her to the Chris Barber Jazz Band.

Patterson joined the Barber band full-time on 28 December 1954, and her first public appearance was at the Royal Festival Hall on 9 January 1955.

Between 1955-62, she toured extensively with the Chris Barber Jazz Band and issued many recordings: those featuring her on every track include the EPs Blues (1955), That Patterson Girl (1955), That Patterson Girl Volume 2 (1956), Ottilie (1959), and the LP Chris Barber's Blues Book (1961); she also appeared on numerous Chris Barber records. She was a key figure in the success of the band. Patterson and Barber were married in 1959.

When famous American blues artists toured the UK in this period, it was often the Chris Barber band that would accompany them. Patterson would thus sing with, for example, Muddy Waters, Sonny Boy Williamson, Big Bill Broonzy, and Sister Rosetta Tharpe. When on tour with the band in the USA, Patterson said that the night she sang, to great acclaim, with Muddy Waters’ band at Smitty’s Corner, was her proudest moment. In 1962, she performed with Barber's band at President Kennedy's Washington Jazz Festival. Touring and performing hundreds of gigs per year however, eventually took its toll on Patterson's health and marriage. From approximately 1963 she began to suffer throat problems and mental health difficulties and ceased to appear or record regularly with Chris Barber, officially retiring from the band in 1973. During this period she recorded some non-jazz/blues material such as settings of Shakespeare (with Chris Barber) and in 1969 issued a solo LP 3000 years with Ottilie which is now much sought after by collectors. In 1964, she sang the theme tune for the British horror film, Where Has Poor Mickey Gone? starring Warren Mitchell.

In early 1980 she began singing with the Chris Barber Band again in a series of lucrative concerts around London, which were recorded for the LP, Madame Blues and Doctor Jazz (1984). The Chris Barber Band back catalogue includes hundreds of songs of many different genres, recorded with Patterson. The tensions from these concerts resulted in her divorce from Barber.

In 1988, Patterson moved to Ayr, Scotland. She became reclusive. She would sing with friends among the band members, but would not perform in public. She died on 20 June 2011, aged 79, in the Rozelle Holm Farm Care Home. She is buried in Movilla Abbey Cemetery, Newtownards, Northern Ireland, in the Patterson family grave. Her gravestone, which is marked Ottilia Anna Barber, is immediately by the left hand wall adjacent to the car park.

In February 2012, a blue plaque marking her birthplace in a terraced house in Comber, County Down was unveiled, and the same evening a sell-out musical tribute was performed at the La Mon Hotel in Comber.

In a BBC documentary entitled My Name is Ottilie, which includes audio recordings of interviews given by Patterson, Dana Masters, a black musician from America living in Northern Ireland, pieces together the story of Patterson's professional and personal life.

== Personal life ==
Soon after Patterson joined the Chris Barber Band in 1954, she became intimately involved with Barber, who was married to his first wife Naida Lane. She became pregnant in 1956 and Barber insisted on an abortion, which was then illegal, and that she perform with the band two days later. She had wanted to have children but her injuries prevented this. The trauma from this event had a profound effect on her. Patterson and Barber were married in 1959 and divorced in 1983.

== Discography ==
=== Solo albums ===
- That Patterson Girl (Jazz Today, 1955)
- That Patterson Girl Volume 2 (Pye, 1956)
- Blues (Decca, 1956)
- Ottilie's Irish Night (Pye, 1959)
- Ottilie (Columbia, 1960)
- Ottilie Swings the Irish (Columbia, 1960)
- 3000 Years with Ottilie (Marmalade, 1969). Re-issued by Sunbeam Records, 2023.
- Spring Song (Polydor, 1971)
- Madame Blues and Doctor Jazz (Black Lion, 1984)

With Chris Barber

- Chris Barber Plays (Jazz Today, 1955)
- Echoes of Harlem (Pye Nixa, 1955)
- Chris Barber in Concert (Pye Nixa, 1957)
- Chris Barber Plays Volume Four (Pye Nixa, 1957)
- Chris Barber in Concert Volume Two (Pye Nixa, 1958)
- Chris Barber in Concert Volume Three (Pye Nixa, 1958)
- Chris Barber Band Box Volume One (Columbia, 1959)
- Barber in Berlin (Columbia, 1960)
- Chris Barber's Blues Book Volume One (Columbia, 1961)
- Chris Barber at the London Palladium (Columbia, 1961)
- Best Yet! Chris Barber Band Box – Volume Three (Columbia, 1962)
- Chris Barber Jazz Band (Qualiton, 1962)
- Chris Barber's Jazz Band in Prague (Supraphon, 1963)
- Folk Barber Style (Decca, 1965)
- Good Mornin' Blues (Columbia, 1965)
- Chris Barber V Praze (Panton, 1971)
- The Chris Barber Jubilee Album 1 (Black Lion, 1975)
- The Chris Barber Jubilee Album 2 (Black Lion, 1975)
- The Chris Barber Jubilee Album 3 (Black Lion, 1975)
- Ottilie Patterson with Chris Barber's Jazzband 1955–1958 (1993)
- Madame Blues & Doctor Jazz (1994)
- 40 Years Jubilee (Timeless, 1994)
- The Chris Barber Concerts (1995)
- Chris Barber's Blues Book Volume One/Good Mornin' Blues (BGO, 1997)
- Echoes of Harlem/Sonny, Brownie and Chris (1997)
- Back in the Old Days (1999)
- Ottilie Patterson with Chris Barber (Jazz Colours, 2000)
- Chris Barber at the BBC (Upbeat, 2000)
- Chris Barber's Jazz Band With Special Guest Sister Rosetta Tharpe (LAKE, 2000)
- Irish Favourites (Pulse, 2001)
- The Best of Chris Barber's Jazz Band (EMI, 2002)
- In Barber's Chair (Lake, 2003)
- Bandbox No. 1 (Lake, 2004)
- The Nixa Jazz Today Albums (Sanctuary, 2004)
- International Concerts: Berlin, Copenhagen, London (Lake, 2005)
- Best Yet! (Lake, 2005)
- The Complete Decca Sessions 1954/55 (Lake, 2006)
- Chris Barber 1955 (Lake, 2006)
- Folk Barber Style (Vocalion, 2006)
- That Patterson Girl (Lake, 2007)
- Chris Barber 1956 (Lake, 2007)

=== Singles ===
- "St Louis Blues"/"The World Is Waiting for the Sunrise" (Decca, 1955)
- "I Hate a Man Like You"/"Reckless Blues" (Decca, 1955)
- "Weeping Willow Blues"/"Nobody Knows You When You're Down and Out" (Decca, 1955)
- "Kay-Cee Rider"/"I Love My Baby" (Pye, 1957)
- "Jailhouse Blues"/"Beale Street Blues" (Pye, 1958)
- "Trombone Cholly"/"Lawdy, Lawdy Blues" (Pye, 1958)
- "There'll Be a Hot Time in the Old Town Tonight"/"Lonesome (Si Tu Vois Ma Mère)" (Columbia, 1959)
- "The Mountains of Mourne"/"Real Old Mountain Dew" (Columbia, 1960)
- "Blueberry Hill"/"I'm Crazy 'Bout My Baby" (Columbia, 1961)
- "Mama, He Treats Your Daughter Mean"/"Swipsy Cakewalk" (Columbia, 1962)
- "Down by the Riverside"/"When the Saints Go Marching In" (Columbia, 1962)
- "I Hate Myself"/"Come On Baby" (Columbia, 1962)
- "Jealous Heart"/"Won't Be Long" (Columbia, 1963)
- "Baby, Please Don't Go"/"I Feel So Good" (Columbia, 1964)
- "Hello Dolly"/"I Shall Not Be Moved" (Columbia, 1964)
- "Tell Me Where Is Fancy Bred"/"Oh Me What Eyes Hath Love Put in My Head" (Columbia, 1964)
- "Spring Song"/"Sound of the Door As It Closes" (Marmalade, 1969)
- "Bitterness of Death"/"Spring Song" (Marmalade, 1969)
- "Careless Love"/"Georgia Grind" (Fat Hen, 1982)

The principal source for this discography is Bielderman and Purser's Chris Barber discography.
