= Dear Daddy =

1976 play by Denis Cannan

- Written by: Denis Cannan
- Original language: English
- Genre: Comedy
- Setting: Bernard's place in the country

Premiere
- Date premiered: 1976
- Place premiered: Ambassadors Theatre; London, England

Dear Daddy is a 1976 play written by English playwright Denis Cannan, first staged at the Ambassadors Theatre in London's West End.

== Productions ==
Opening night cast

- Nigel Patrick as Bernard
- Isabel Dean as Mary
- Jennifer Hilary as Gillian
- Joseph Blatchley as Billy
- David Crosse as Frank
- Patrick Drury as Charles
- Rosalind March as Gwen
- Phyllis Calvert as Delia

== Awards and nominations ==
Awards

- 1976 Laurence Olivier Award for Best New Play
