= John Duttine =

British actor (born 1949)

- Born: John Arthur Duttine; 15 March 1949 (age 77); Barnsley, West Riding of Yorkshire, England
- Occupation: Actor
- Years active: 1973–present
- Spouse: Mel Martin (m. 1998)

John Arthur Duttine (born 15 March 1949) is an English actor noted for his roles on stage, films and television. He is well known for his role as Sgt George Miller in Heartbeat and Bill Masen in the TV series The Day of the Triffids.

== Early life ==
Duttine was born on 15 March 1949 in Barnsley, West Riding of Yorkshire, England.

He attended Buttershaw Secondary School; Stephen Petcher from his school would also appear in Heartbeat. He grew up in Buttershaw, in southwest Bradford. He trained at the Drama Centre London in north London. In London he shared a flat with Bradford actor Ken Kitson.

== Career ==
In 1973, Duttine starred opposite Francesca Annis in the BBC adaptation of A Pin to See the Peep Show by F. Tennyson Jesse. This was followed in 1974 by a small role in the TV adaptation of the Lord Peter Wimsey story The Nine Tailors. His first big break came when he played John the Apostle in the 1977 television mini-series Jesus of Nazareth. This was followed almost immediately by his portrayal of Keith Nicholson, husband of football pools winner, Vivian Nicholson in John Goldschmidt's Spend, Spend, Spend (a Play for Today). He went on to star in the 1978 historical drama series The Devil's Crown, as the future King John.

Duttine then played leading roles in major BBC adaptations such as Wuthering Heights (as Earnshaw) in 1978. He became a household name for his lead performance in To Serve Them All My Days in 1980, for which he won the TV Times Best Actor award. He appeared to great acclaim in The Day of the Triffids (1981). In 1983 he starred in The Outsider as well as in the Tales of the Unexpected episode Hit And Run in which he played Doctor Roger Ashburn, a doctor who co-conceives an elaborate insurance fraud involving the staged disappearance and death of his wife (Susan Penhaligon), the sitcom Lame Ducks in 1984, and Ain't Misbehavin' from 1994 to 1995 as well as DI Eric Temple in all twelve episodes of Out of the Blue. He played opposite Sir Laurence Olivier in the play Saturday, Sunday, Monday, part of the Laurence Olivier Presents anthology series.

His film roles include Who Dares Wins (1982) and The Hawk (1993). More recent TV credits include: Doc Martin, Touching Evil, Taggart, Dangerfield, Midsomer Murders, Peak Practice, The Bill, Casualty, EastEnders, Dalziel and Pascoe and Jane Hall.

Duttine has played two characters in the UK television series Heartbeat. His first appearance was as Paul Methorn, an MP and peace activist, in episode 7 of the first series: Face Value. He then played the role of Sgt. George Miller, the character making his first appearance in episode 16 of series 14: Golf Papa One Zero.

In 2007, he guest starred in the Doctor Who audio drama "Exotron & Urban Myths". In 2011 he guest-starred in Vera, playing a lieutenant colonel. More recently (November 2013) Duttine appeared in BBC TV's The Paradise.

In 2015, he appeared as Douglas Taylor in Series 3 of the BBC series WPC 56.

In 2016, he appeared as George Hammond in the BBC series Father Brown episode 4.3 "The Hangman's Demise". In 2016, he also appeared in the ITV/Netflix series Paranoid.

== Personal life ==
Duttine has a son by a former partner (now deceased) in Tarleton, West Lancashire. In 1998 he married actress Mel Martin, with whom he lived in Cornwall until 2011. The two have appeared on screen together in Talking to Strange Men, Casualty and EastEnders. Though Mel Martin appeared in Heartbeat when John Duttine played Sergeant Miller, they never appeared in scenes together. His nephew is fellow actor Joe Duttine, who currently plays Tim Metcalfe in ITV soap opera Coronation Street. Joe's father, Geoffrey, is John's brother.

== Filmography ==
=== Film ===
Year	Title	Role	Notes
1982	Who Dares Wins	Rod Walker	Feature film
1993	The Hawk	John	Feature film

=== Television ===
Year	Title	Role	Notes
1973	A Pin to See the Peepshow	Leonard Carr	Miniseries, 3 episodes
1973	Armchair Theatre	New Soldier	TV series, 1 episode
1973	Softly, Softly: Task Force	Thomas Ross	TV series, 1 episode
1974	The Nine Tailors	Walter Pratt	Miniseries, 2 episodes
1974	Centre Play	Leach	TV play series, 1 episode
1974	Rooms	Tony	TV series, 2 episodes
1975	Churchill's People	Richard Murlyn	TV series, 1 episode
1975	Ten from the Twenties	Bill	TV play series, 1 episode
1976	Warship	AB Scobie	TV series, 1 episode
1974; 1976	Z-Cars	Bartlett / Jesse Alty	TV series, 2 episodes
1975; 1976	Angels	Larry / Dr Frank Crozier	TV series, 2 episodes
1977	Coronation Street	Alec Baker	TV series, 2 episodes
1977	Holding On	Harry Wheelwright	TV series, 2 episodes
1977	Jesus of Nazareth	John the Evangelist	Miniseries, 4 episodes
1977	Beryl's Lot	Mervyn	TV series, 3 episodes
1977–84	Play for Today	Jimmy Walker / Stone / Keith Nicholson	TV series, 3 episodes
1977	London Belongs to Me		TV series
1978	Laurence Olivier Presents: Saturday Sunday Monday	Frederico	TV movie
1978	People Like Us	Archie Carver	Miniseries, 12 episodes
1978	The Law Centre	David Metcalfe	TV series, 1 episode
1978	The Devil's Crown	King John	TV series, 9 episodes
1978	Wuthering Heights	Hindley Earnshaw	Miniseries, 4 episodes
1979	Strangers	Lennie Brookes	TV series, 1 episode
1979	The Mallens	Donald Radlet	TV series, 7 episodes
1980–81	To Serve Them All My Days	David Powlett-Jones	TV series, 13 episodes
1981	Jackanory	Storyteller	TV series, 5 episodes
1981	The Day of the Triffids	Bill Masen	Miniseries, 6 episodes
1982	Jackanory Playhouse	Scar	TV series, 1 episode
1982–83	Tales of the Unexpected	Doctor Roger Ashburn / Max	TV series, 2 episodes
1983	Shades of Darkness	Garvin	TV series, 1 episode
1983	The Outsider	Frank Scully	Miniseries, 6 episodes
1984	Love and Marriage	Dave	TV series, 1 episode
1984–85	Lame Ducks	Brian Drake	TV series, 12 episodes
1985	A Woman of Substance	Joe Lowther	Miniseries, 3 episodes
1985	Summer Season	Alan Hardacre	TV series, 1 episode
1986	Rainbow	John	TV series, 1 episode
1986	Unnatural Causes	John Forrest	TV series, 1 episode
1987	A Killing on the Exchange	DS Lance Thorne	Miniseries, 6 episodes
1987	Imaginary Friends	Roger Zimmerman	Miniseries, 3 episodes
1989	The Play on One	Tim	TV series, 1 episode
1992	Heartbeat	Paul Methorn	TV series, season 1, episode 7
1992	The Ruth Rendell Mysteries	John Creevey	TV series, 1 episode: "Talking to Strange Men"
1993	Love Hurts	Nikolai Herzen	TV series, 2 episodes
1993; 1995: 2001; 2003	Casualty	Various characters	TV series, 4 episodes
1994–95	Ain’t Misbehavin	Dave Drysdale	TV series, 12 episodes
1996	Taggart	Robert Stirling	TV series, 3 episodes
1995–96	Out of the Blue	Detective Inspector Eric Temple	TV series, 12 episodes
1996	Dangerfield	Stephen Wakeman	TV series, 1 episode
1997	Pilgrim's Rest	Duncan	FV series, 1 episode
1997	Noah's Ark	Robin Layton	TV series, 1 episode
1998	Touching Evil	Michael Hawkins	TV series, 4 episodes
1998	Verdict	Dr Matthew Dixon	TV series, 1 episode
1998	Maisie Raine	Howard Jeavons	TV series, 1 episode
1999	Midsomer Murders	Will Saxby	TV series, 1 episode
2000	This Is Personal: The Hunt for the Yorkshire Ripper	Detective Chief Supt Jim Hobson	Miniseries, 2 episodes
2000	Peak Practice	Larry Pearce	TV series, 1 episode
1992; 1994; 1998; 2001	The Bill	Ray Lyons / Andrew Cross / Kavanagh / Michael Bennett	TV series, 4 episodes
2001	Sweet Revenge	Police Inspector	Miniseries
2001	Brookside	Richard Dobson / Defence Barrister	TV series, 5 episodes
2002	The Jury	Mark Waters	TV series, 6 episodes
2002	Rockface	John Taylor	TV series, 1 episode
2002	EastEnders	Mr Haywood	TV series, 7 episodes
2002	Where the Heart Is	Graham Bryant	TV series, 1 episode
2002	Real Crime	Colin Pitchfork	TV series, 1 episode
2002	Dalziel and Pascoe	Danny Macer	TV series, 1 episode
2003	The Inspector Lynley Mysteries	John Penellin	TV series, 1 episode
2003	Murder Investigation Team	John Pemberton	TV series, 1 episode
2004	The Courtroom	Gavin Street	TV series, 4 episodes
2004–08	Heartbeat	Sergeant Miller	TV series, seasons 14–18, 105 episodes
2006	Jane Hall	Gareth Hall	TV series, 3 episodes
2010	A Passionate Woman	Rick	Miniseries, 1 episode
2011	Doc Martin	Paul Hale	TV series, 1 episode
2011	Vera	Lieutenant Colonel Chappell	TV series, 1 episode
2013	The Paradise	Campbell Balentine	TV series, 1 episode
2015	WPC 56	Douglas Taylor	TV series, season 3, 5 episodes
2016	Father Brown	George Hammond	TV series, episode 4.3: "The Hangman's Demise"
2016	Paranoid	Eric Benton	TV series, 5 episodes

=== Audio ===
Year	Title	Role	Notes
2007	Doctor Who	Major Taylor	Audio drama: "Exotron & Urban Myths"
