= John Malcolm (actor) =

Scottish actor (1936–2008)

- L to R: Harker (Malcolm), Colin Eddington and Francis finding the "Treasure" in "Three Locks to Fortune", The Adventures of Black Beauty
- Born: 26 March 1936; Stirling, Scotland
- Died: 13 June 2008 (aged 72); Edinburgh, Scotland
- Occupation(s): Stage, film and TV actor

John McDowell Malcolm (26 March 1936 – 13 June 2008) was a Scottish actor who appeared in numerous films and television productions over a 40-year period.

He attended Barnsley Holgate Grammar School for Boys, Barnsley and trained as an actor at RADA. He then appeared in repertory theatre in Scotland and England and with the Royal Shakespeare Company. He also founded the Traverse Theatre, Edinburgh in 1962 and The Theatre Chipping Norton in 1973.

His film appearances included Where Has Poor Mickey Gone? (1964), The Reckoning (1969), The House That Dripped Blood (1971), The Ragman's Daughter (1972), Coming Out of the Ice (1982), and The Dirty Dozen: Next Mission (1985). His television appearances included Enemy at the Door as Oberleutnant Kluge, Nanny, Coronation Street, and the 1988 miniseries War and Remembrance as Field Marshal Wilhelm Keitel.
