= Ladies in Charge =

Television series

- Genre: Drama
- Starring: Carol Royle; Julia Hills; Julia Swift
- Country of origin: United Kingdom
- Original language: English
- No. of series: 1
- No. of episodes: 6

Production
- Running time: 52 minutes
- Production company: Thames Television

Original release
- Network: ITV
- Release: 6 May – 17 June 1986

Ladies in Charge is a British television series that originally aired on ITV in 1986. It followed on from a pilot episode that appeared on the Storyboard anthology series in 1985.

Returning from the First World War where they have served as volunteer ambulance drivers, three women join to form an agency dedicated to helping those who are struggling.

== Cast ==
=== Main ===
- Carol Royle as Diana Granville
- Julia Hills as Babs Palmer
- Julia Swift as Vicky Barton
- Graham Chinn as Frank Sutton
- Amanda Root as Polly Swift (pilot only)

=== Selected others ===
- Nigel Davenport as Count Litvinoff
- Hugh Grant as Gerald Boughton-Green
- Pam Ferris as Charlie
- Deborah Findlay as Hetty
- Julian Glover as Ernest
- Patrick Newell as Maxwell
- Imelda Staunton as Edith
- Gavin Richards as Cosmo Keble
- Suzanne Bertish as Clara Cane
- Kathy Burke as Daisy
- Robert Addie as Hugo
- Michael Gough as Arthur James
- Irene Worth as Countess Kutuzov
- Richard Vernon as Lord Brompton

== Bibliography ==
- Maxford, Howard. Hammer Complete: The Films, the Personnel, the Company. McFarland, 2018.
