= Simon Cadell =

English actor (1950–1996)

- Undated publicity photograph
- Born: Simon John Cadell; 19 July 1950; London, England
- Died: 6 March 1996 (aged 45); London, England
- Resting place: All Saints, Honington, Suffolk
- Occupation: Actor
- Years active: 1967–1996
- Television: Hi-de-Hi!
- Spouse: Rebecca Croft (m. 1986)
- Children: 2
- Relatives: Selina Cadell (sister); Jean Cadell (grandmother); Francis Cadell (great-uncle); Guy Siner (cousin)

Simon John Cadell (19 July 1950 – 6 March 1996) was a classically trained English actor, best known for his portrayal of Jeffrey Fairbrother in the first five series of the BBC situation comedy Hi-de-Hi!.

== Early life ==
Born in London, he was the son of theatrical agent John Cadell, grandson of the Scottish character actress Jean Cadell, great-nephew of Francis Cadell, the brother of the actress Selina Cadell, the cousin of the actor Guy Siner and son-in-law of the television producer David Croft. He was educated at The Hall School in Hampstead and Bedales School at Petersfield where his close friends included Gyles Brandreth, who remained a friend until Cadell's death.

== Career ==
Cadell was a member of the National Youth Theatre and appeared with them in the 1967 production of Zigger Zagger. He trained at the Bristol Old Vic Theatre School. His first successes were found in the theatre in the mid to late 1970s. An early television role was in Simon Gray's Play for Today's in 1975 Plaintiffs and Defendants and the sequel Two Sundays both opposite Alan Bates. He then provided the voice of Blackberry in the animated adaptation of Watership Down (1978), based on the novel by Richard Adams. Subsequently, he had roles in television programmes such as Enemy at the Door (1978–80), and also appeared briefly in the disaster film Meteor (1979) as a TV news reporter.

He is best remembered for his role as the well-meaning holiday camp manager Jeffrey Fairbrother in the BBC situation comedy Hi-de-Hi! (1980–84) and for playing the disingenuous civil servant Dundridge in the screen adaptation of a novel by Tom Sharpe, Blott on the Landscape (1985). On radio he played the elven-king Celeborn in the BBC adaptation of The Lord of the Rings (1981). He appeared in the BBC sitcom Life Without George (1987–1989) which ran for three series.

Cadell appeared in the 1991 British comedy series Singles. Other television credits include, Minder, Bergerac, The Kenny Everett Television Show and Roald Dahl's Tales of the Unexpected (playing the co-pilot in the episode "Hijack"). He was also in heavy demand as a voice-over for television commercials. He narrated the children's television series Bump for the BBC, about a baby elephant (who always bumps into things) and his friend Birdie.

== Personal life ==
In 1986 Cadell married actress Rebecca Croft, the daughter of Dad's Army and Hi-de-Hi! co-creator David Croft. The couple had two sons.

In the 1980s he was a supporter of the Social Democratic Party.

== Health problems and death ==
In January 1993 Cadell, a heavy smoker of up to 80 cigarettes a day, suffered a near-fatal heart attack after giving a recital with Joanna Lumley at the Queen Elizabeth Hall, in London. He returned to the stage four months after undergoing triple heart bypass surgery, but was diagnosed with lymphoma in September 1993, while being treated for pneumonia.

Cadell died in London on 6 March 1996, at the age of 45. He is buried in All Saints churchyard at Honington, Suffolk where the Croft family had their home.

== Television roles ==
Year	Title	Role	Notes
1969	Hadleigh	John Scully	Episode: "Some You Win Some You Lose"
1975	Play for Today: Plaintiffs and Defendants	Sallust	
1975	Play for Today: Two Sundays	Sallust	
1976	The Dame of Sark	Dr Braun	
1978–80	Enemy at the Door	Hauptsturmführer Reinicke	
1978	Edward & Mrs. Simpson	Major John Aird	
1980	Play for Today: The Executioner	Mr. Fowler	
1980	Minder	Simon	"All Mod Cons" (1980)
1980–84	Hi-de-Hi!	Prof. Jeffrey Fairbrother	
1981	Bergerac	Hedley Cross	"Campaign for Silence" (1981)
1981–84	Tales of the Unexpected	Co-pilot; Sam Luke	"Hijack" (1981) "Have a Nice Death" (1984)
1985	Blott on the Landscape	Mr. Dundridge	
1987–89	Life Without George	Larry Wade	
1989	Frederick Forsyth Presents: Pride and Extreme Prejudice	Wilson	
1989	Minder	William Pierce	"The Wrong Goodbye" (1989)
1989	Anything More Would Be Greedy	Narrator	
1990–94	Bump the Elephant	Narrator	
1991	Singles	Denis Duvall	

== Film roles ==
Year	Title	Role	Notes
1978	Watership Down	Blackberry	Voice
1979	Meteor	BBC News Reporter	Uncredited
1996	The Cold Light of Day	Vladimir Kozant	
