= Carol Royle =

British actress

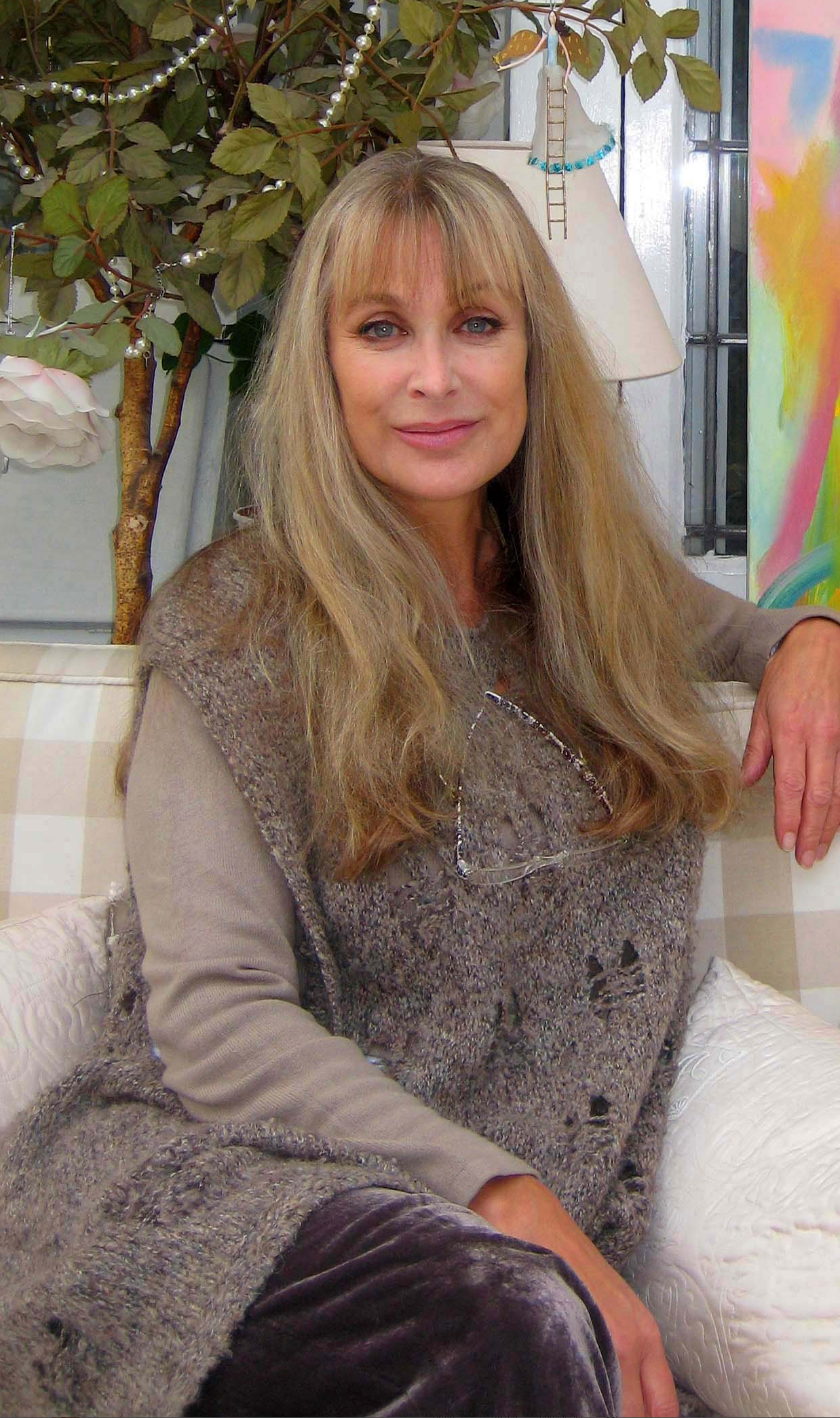
- Royle in 2011
- Born: Carol Buchanan Royle; 10 February 1954 (age 72); Blackpool, Lancashire, England
- Occupation: Actress
- Spouse: Julian Spear (m. 1977; died 2024)
- Children: 2
- Website: carolroyle.co.uk

Carol Buchanan Royle (born 10 February 1954) is an English actress. She is best known for playing Jenny Russell in the BBC sitcom Life Without George (1987–1989) and Lady Patricia Brewster in Heartbeat (1997–2003).

== Early life ==
Born in Blackpool, the daughter of actor Derek Royle, Carol Royle studied drama at the Central School of Speech and Drama.

== Career ==
Making her screen debut in 45 episodes of The Cedar Tree from 1977 to 1978, Royle went on to become known for her role as Jenny Russell in the BBC sitcom Life Without George, which ran for three series from 1987 to 1989, as well as her role in ITV1's 1960s-based drama Heartbeat, in which she played Austin Healey-driving Lady Patricia Brewster in four episodes. In 1989, she appeared in the prominent role of Jessica in Blackeyes, written by Dennis Potter. Other television shows Royle has appeared in are Blake's 7, The Professionals, Bergerac, Hammer House of Mystery and Suspense, Cribb, Crossroads, The Outsider, Casualty, Ladies in Charge, Crime Traveller, The Bill, Doctors, and Father Brown. Her film career includes roles in The Greek Tycoon (1978) and Tuxedo Warrior (1982).

From 2019 to 2023, Royle played Mrs. Bright in the Inspector Morse prequel Endeavour, appearing in five episodes of the series.

== Personal life ==
Royle married musician Julian Spear, son of actor Bernard Spear, in 1977. They had two children, a son and a daughter. Spear suffered a brain haemorrhage and died on 9 December 2024.

Her younger sister Amanda Royle is also an actress. The two played sisters in the 1990 Casualty episode "Say It With Flowers".

== Filmography ==
=== Film ===
Year	Title	Role(s)	Notes
1978	The Greek Tycoon	Nico's Girlfriend	
1982	Tuxedo Warrior	Lisa	
1989	Deadline	Carol	
2014	Miss in Her Teens	Aunt	
2021	Put Away	Prudence	Short film
2024	Christmas at Plumhill Manor	Lorraine	

=== Television ===
Year	Title	Role(s)	Notes
1977–1978	The Cedar Tree	Laura Collins (later Cartland)	Series 2–4; 45 episodes
1978	Blake's 7	Mutoid	Series 1; Episode 8: "Duel"
1978	The Professionals	Helen Pierce	Series 2; Episode 8: "A Stirring of Dust"
1979	The Professionals	Anna Batak	Series 3; Episode 4: "Dead Reckoning"
1979	The Dick Francis Thriller: The Racing Game	Trish Latham	Episode 2: "Trackdown"
1979	Screenplay	Miriam Cromer	Episode 1: "Waxwork" (Pilot for series, Cribb)
1980	Heartland	Jane Price	Series 2; Episodes 3 & 4: "Family" and "The Sponge Man"
1983	Storyboard	Jane Alexander	Series 1; Episode 2: "Judgement Day"
1983	Possibilities	Anita	Television film
1983	Shades of Darkness	Maggie Winthrop	Series 1; Episode 3: "Feet Foremost"
1983	The Outsider	Fiona Lytton Neave	All 6 episodes
1983	Bergerac	Irene Maybank	Series 3; Episode 1: "Ninety Per Cent Proof"
1984	Hammer House of Mystery and Suspense	Kim Osborn / Catherine Parkes	Episode 11: "And the Wall Came Tumbling Down"
1984	Oxbridge Blues	Tory	Episode 2: "That Was Tory"
1984	Oxbridge Blues	Ellen	Episode 5: "The Muse"
1985	Summer Season	Eleanor	Episode 15: "A Still Small Shout"
1985	Storyboard	Diana Granville	Series 2; Episode 2: "Ladies in Charge" (Pilot for series)
1986	Ladies in Charge	Diana Granville	All 6 episodes
1987	Screen Two	Rachel	Series 3; Episode 14: "Hedgehog Wedding"
1987	London Embassy	Hon. Sophie Graveney	Mini-series; Episode 1: "An Unofficial English Rose"
1987–1989	Life Without George	Jenny Russell	Series 1–3; All 20 episodes
1989	Blackeyes	Jessica	Mini-series; All 4 episodes
1990	CASUAL+Y	Lizzie Trent	Series 5; Episode 7: "Say It with Flowers"
1996	The Bill	Lyn Forbes	Series 12; Episode 48: "Cheating"
1997	Crime Traveller	Sonja Duvall	Episode 3: "Fashion Shoot"
1997	Thief Takers	Julia Maybury	Series 3; Episode 2: "Fashion Victims"
1997–2003	Heartbeat	Lady Patricia Brewster	Recurring role; 4 episodes
1999	Grange Hill	Sarah Lyons	Series 22; Episode 5
2001	Second Sight	Sarah Finch	Episodes 1 & 2: "Hide and Seek: Parts 1 & 2"
2001	The Bill	Jennifer Salter	Series 17; Episodes 38 & 39: "Complicity: Parts 1 & 2"
2001–2002	Crossroads	Diane Lawrence	4 episodes
2005	Doctors	Kathy Watson	Series 6; Episode 127: "Conflicts of Interest"
2006	Mayo	Gwen Bainbridge	Mini-series; Episode 2: "Requiem for a Dove"
2006	Doctors	Victoria Payne	Series 8; 10 episodes
2007	New Tricks	Diane Bathley-Jones	Series 4; Episode 7: "Father's Pride"
2010	Casualty	Sheila Bainbridge	Series 24; Episode 20: "Dark Places"
2011	Doctors	Martha Locke	Series 12; Episode 223: "Chelsea Girl"
2012	Doctors	Alice Davidson	Series 14; Episode 87: "What I'm Good At"
2015–2016	CASUAL+Y	Emilie Groome	Series 30; 4 episodes
2017	Father Brown	Lady Ursula Lansford	Series 5; Episode 5: "The Hand of Lucia"
2017	Doctors	Elaine Bottrell	Series 19; Episode 117: "The Old Toe and the New Nose"
2019	Shakespeare & Hathaway: Private Investigators	Anastasia Kusk	Series 2; Episode 3: "This Cursed Hand"
2019–2020	Endeavour	Mrs. Bright	Series 6 & 7; 5 episodes
2024–present	Coronation Street	Anthea Deering	Mother of Joel Deering
