= Christopher Robbie =

British actor and theatre director (born 1938)

- Born: Christopher James Alan Robbie; 30 May 1938 (age 88); Edmonton, London, England
- Occupations: Actor, theatre director, playwright

Christopher Robbie (born 30 May 1938) is a British actor, television announcer, theatre director and designer, playwright and photographer. He trained as an actor at RADA in London, and has had a distinguished theatrical career, playing the title role in King Lear when a member of the Royal Shakespeare Company.

He has performed a one-man play about the life of Charles Darwin. Under the pseudonym James Alan he wrote the play The Sirens of Eroc. As a film actor he appeared in Where Has Poor Mickey Gone? (1964). As a television actor he appeared in the Doctor Who stories The Mind Robber (1968) and Revenge of the Cybermen (1975), as well as in The Avengers, UFO, Dempsey and Makepeace and One Foot in the Grave, among others. As a photographer he has held exhibitions of his work.

He was an in-vision announcer for Southern Television. He announced on the company's final day of broadcasting (31 December 1981) and presented its final programme And It's Goodbye From Us ... He announced, although less often, for TVS in the 1980s, and had stints in the announcer's chair at Associated-Rediffusion, Thames Television and Anglia Television.

His grandfather, William Sleator, was a pioneer of French football.
