= Ray Armstrong (actor) =

English actor (born 1937)

- Born: London, England
- Occupation: Actor
- Spouse: Anne Clemetson

Ray Armstrong is an English actor.

== Life and career ==
Armstrong was born in London. Armstrong developed an interest in the stage whilst at school. After leaving school, he took on various jobs, such as being a reporter on the Kent and Sussex Courier for almost a year. Afterwards, he went to Madrid for two years to learn bullfighting. Realising killing bulls was not his forte, Armstrong returned to England with theatrical inclinations.

He worked with the Forestry Commission in England and later went on to pursue an acting career. He was a member of the travelling Children's Theatre Company, performing in small villages and towns. Subsequently, Armstrong became involved in repertory theatre.

He appeared in a number of films, including Where Has Poor Mickey Gone? (1964), Code Name: Emerald (1985) and Shirley Valentine (1989). On television he appeared in such shows as Gideon's Way, Dixon of Dock Green, Department S, Strange Report and Doctor Who. He played Colin Wade, MI5 agent, in Freewheelers, where he performed all his own stunt work.

== Personal life ==
Ray Armstrong was married to Anne Clemetson. The couple had two children, Jane and Thomas.

== Selected filmography ==
=== Film ===
Year	Title	Role	Notes
1964	Where Has Poor Mickey Gone?	Ginger	as Raymond Armstrong
1985	Code Name: Emerald	Willoughby	
1987	The Second Victory	British Corporal	
1988	Murder One	Man in Store	
1989	Shirley Valentine	Executive Type	

=== Television ===
Year	Title	Role	Notes
1968	The Wednesday Play	Tom Sackville	Episode: "Toggle"
1968	Theatre 625	2nd Tugman	Episode: "Party Games"
1968	Softly, Softly	White	Episode: "Minor Incident"
1969	Department S	Farmer	Episode: "The Pied Piper of Hambledown"
1970	Doctor Who	Grey	2 episodes; serial "The Ambassadors of Death"
1970	UFO	Rescuer	Episode: "Survival"
1971	Justice	Sergeant Barker	Episode: "You Didn't Pay for Justice"
1972	The Regiment	Foster	Episode: "Wine and Retribution"
1976	The New Avengers	1st Guard	Episode: "The Last of the Cybernauts...??"
1978	Within These Walls	Insp. Worth	Episode: "The Inquest"
1978	The Famous Five	Inspector	Episode: "Five on a Secret Trail"
1979	The Onedin Line	Dutchy	Episode: "Liverpool Bound"
1980	Turtle's Progress	Lug-Wrench	Episode #2.3
1982	Harry's Game	Lt. Colonel	2 episodes
1984	The Bill	Det. Chief Insp. Kirk	Episode: "Long Odds"
1986	Return to Treasure Island	Captain Williams	2 episodes
1988	The Dirty Dozen: The Fatal Mission	Kranz	TV Movie
1993	Soldier Soldier	Brigadier	Episode: "Camouflage"
1993	The Bill	Mr. Hammond	Episode: "Cause for Concern"
1996	The Bill	Harry Knapman	Episode: "Dancers"
2001	Casualty	Phil Yorath	Episode: "Allied Forces"
