= Lame Ducks =

1984 BBC television series

- Genre: Comedy
- Written by: Peter Hammond
- Directed by: John B. Hobbs
- Starring: John Duttine
- Country of origin: United Kingdom
- Original language: English
- No. of series: 2
- No. of episodes: 12

Production
- Producer: John B. Hobbs
- Running time: 30 minutes

Original release
- Network: BBC2
- Release: 22 October 1984 – 22 October 1985

Lame Ducks is a British television sitcom made by the BBC in 1984 and written by Peter J. Hammond. This was his first venture into comedy writing having made his name in drama, and being best known for creating Sapphire & Steel.

The series starred John Duttine as Brian Drake, a man who, no longer able to work due to a serious injury after being hit by a truck, decides to head off to live as a hermit. As he goes along, he is joined by various other outcasts, including a woman called Angie (played by Lorraine Chase). The group eventually settle at a derelict railway station.

Later, a private detective called Ansell (played by Brian Murphy), hired by Drake's wife (Primi Townsend), locates the group, but, as an outcast himself, decides to join them.

== Cast ==
- John Duttine as Brian Drake
- Lorraine Chase as Angie
- Brian Murphy as Ansell
- Patric Turner as Tommy
- Tony Millan as Maurice
- Cyd Hayman as Mrs. Kelly
- Primi Townsend as Mrs. Drake (Series 1)
- Giles Cole as Ray
- Edward Highmore as Freddie
