= Michael Thomas (actor) =

British theatre actor (1952–2019)

- Born: 11 April 1952; Westcliff-on-Sea, Essex, England
- Died: 4 March 2019 (aged 66); London, England
- Spouse: Selina Cadell (m. 1985)
- Children: Edwin Thomas; Letty Thomas

Michael Thomas (11 April 1952 – 4 March 2019) was a British theatre actor, who worked on the English stage and screen for the past forty years. His career saw him work for the Old Vic, the National Theatre, and the RSC on numerous occasions.

He also appeared on television, with a leading role in the six episode BBC serial Inside Out, in Inspector Morse, episode "Ghost in the Machine", as John McKendrick and also in the Endeavour episode "Sway" as Rufus Haldane.

Thomas toured in Sam Mendes' production of As You Like It and The Tempest, playing to theatres in New York, China, Singapore, Germany, Holland, Paris, Madrid, London and Greece (Epidaurus). Most recently, Thomas has appeared in All's Well That Ends Well, St. Joan and Pillars of the Community at the National, Waste and Festen at the Almeida Theatre, King Lear and In Praise of Love at The Chichester Festival Theatre and Women Beware Women, Edward II, The Roman Actor, Henry V, The Comedy of Errors, and Henry V at the RSC.

He was married until his death to the actress Selina Cadell, and has two children, Edwin and Letty. He was born and raised in Southend-on-Sea and was a keen sailor. In 2010, Michael was diagnosed with an aggressive form of myeloma, and received a life-saving bone marrow donation from Jeremy Brice, who was registered as a donor with Anthony Nolan.

On 9 March 2019 his son Edwin posted on Twitter, "I'm sad to announce my wonderful Dad, the actor Michael Thomas, left us all for his journey North in the early hours of Mon. morning. He was at home, surrounded by love, & after such a fight is surely now sailing the North Sea he loved so much. Am so proud to be his son. Edwin x". Thomas died on Monday 4 March. His funeral was in Stoke Newington on 10 March.

== Filmography ==
Year	Title	Role	Notes
1980	Twelfth Night	Sebastian	BBC Television Shakespeare
1990	Paper Mask	Teaching Doctor	
2009	The Boat That Rocked	Sandford	
2009	National Theatre Live: All's Well That Ends Well	Lafew	
2014	The Crucible	Reverend Parris	
2019	The Crown	Prince Henry, Duke of Gloucester	Posthumous release
