= Francis Cadell (artist) =

Scottish painter (1883–1937)

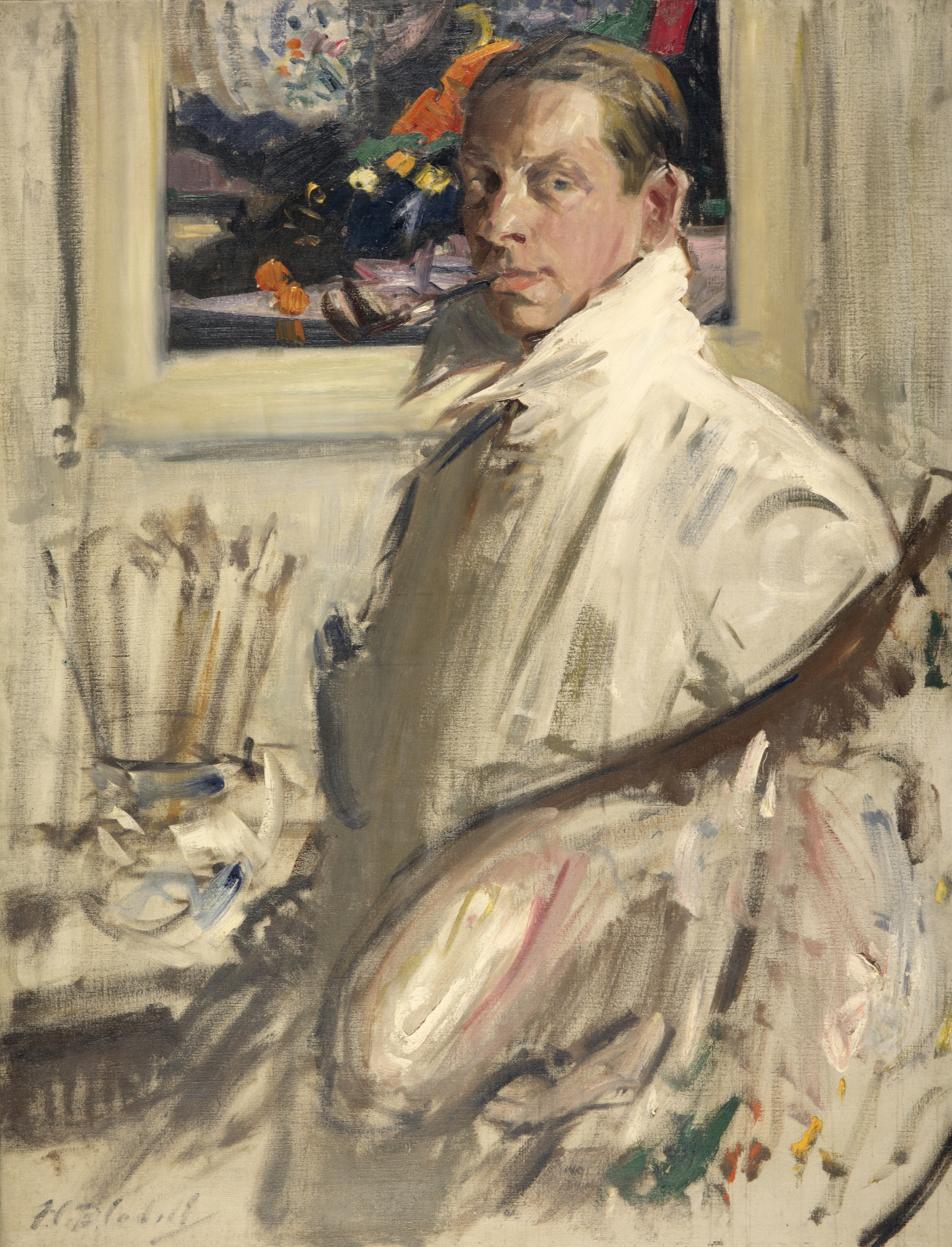
- Self-portrait, c. 1914
- Born: 12 April 1883; Edinburgh
- Died: 6 December 1937 (aged 54); Edinburgh
- Resting place: Dean Cemetery
- Known for: Painting
- Movement: Scottish Colourists
- Relatives: Jean Cadell (sister)
- Awards: Royal Scottish Academician

Francis Campbell Boileau Cadell RSA (12 April 1883 – 6 December 1937) was a Scottish Colourist painter, renowned for his depictions of the elegant New Town interiors of his native Edinburgh, and for his work on Iona.

From October 2011 to March 2012 the Scottish National Gallery of Modern Art held a major solo retrospective of Cadell's work, the first since that held at the National Gallery of Scotland in 1942.

== Life and work ==
Francis Cadell (pronounced "Caddle") was born in Edinburgh, the son of Dr Francis Cadell FRCSE (1844–1909), a wealthy surgeon and his wife, Mary Hamilton Boileau (1853–1907).

His childhood home was at 22 Ainslie Place on Edinburgh's prestigious Moray Estate, and he was educated privately at the Edinburgh Academy. His sister was Jean Cadell, a well-known actress. From the age of 16 he studied in Paris at the Académie Julian, where he was in contact with the French avant-garde of the day. While in France, his exposure to work by the early Fauvists, and in particular Matisse, proved to be his most lasting influence. After his return to Scotland, he was a regular exhibitor in Edinburgh and Glasgow, as well as in London.

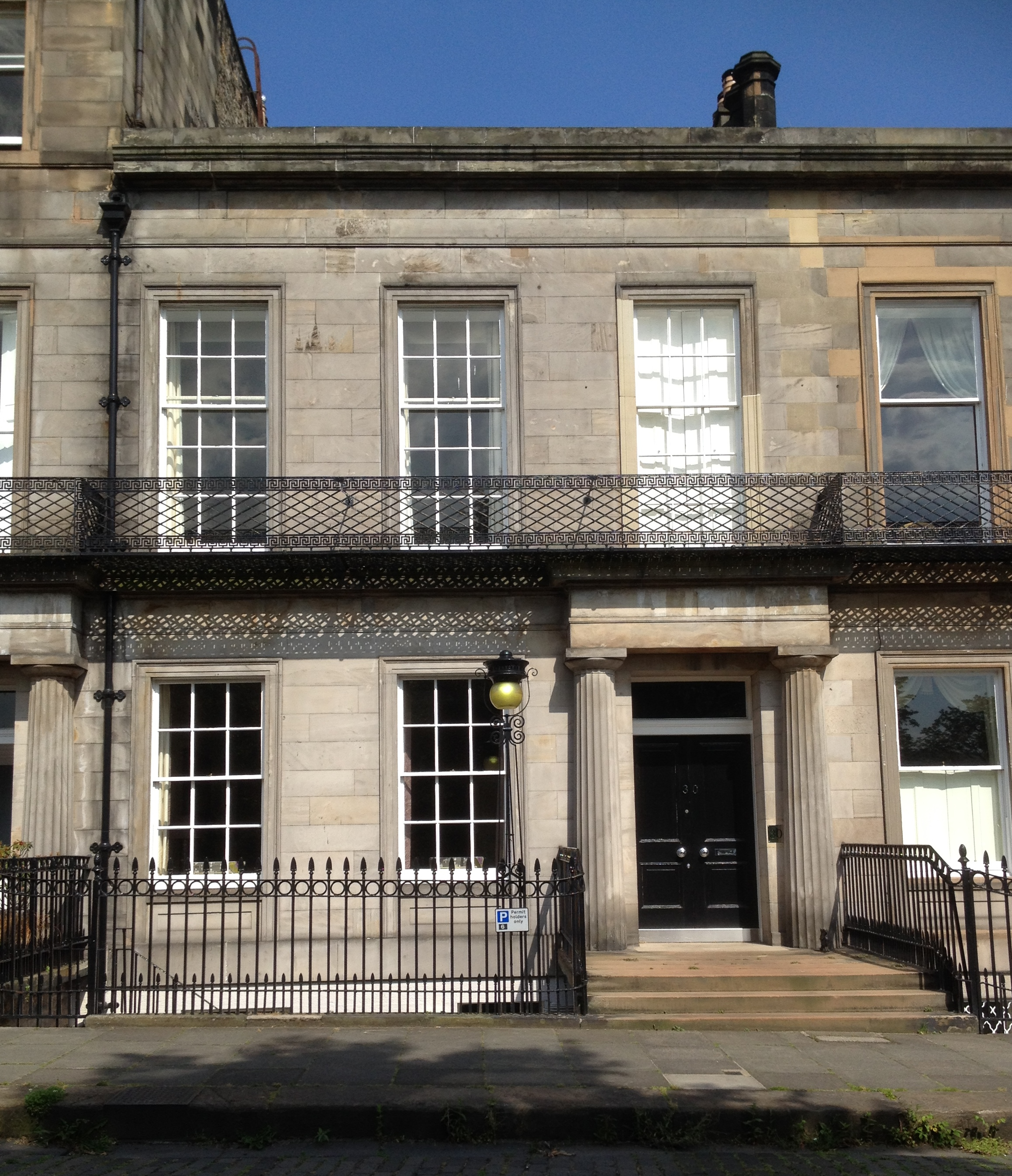
Cadell's home at 30 Regent Terrace, Edinburgh

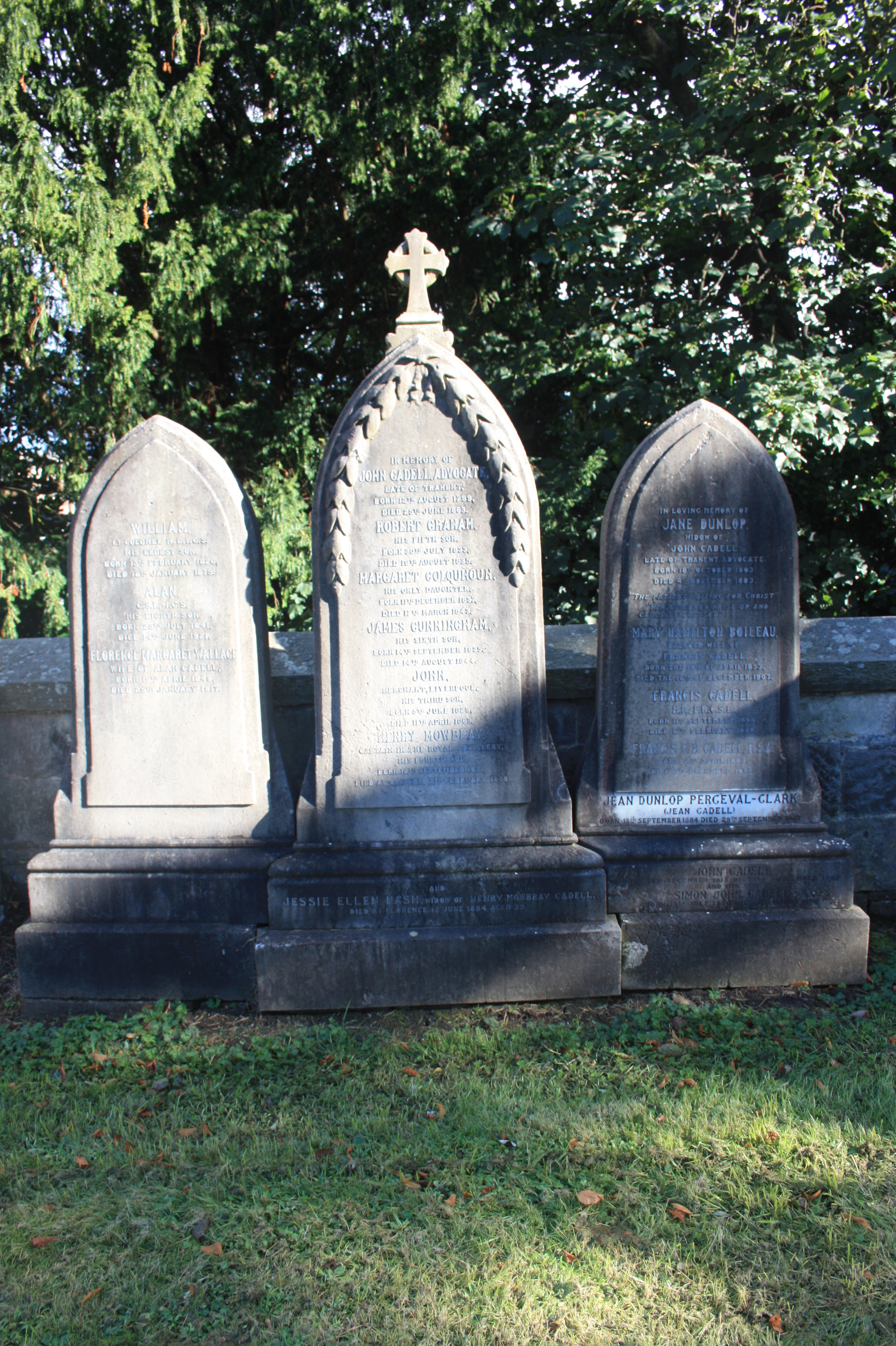
The grave of Francis Cadell, Dean Cemetery

Cadell was a left-handed painter. While a student, the President of the Royal Scottish Academy tried to stop him painting with his left hand because "No artist ever became great who did so." Cadell swiftly replied "Sir and did not the great Michelangelo paint with his left hand?" The President did not respond and left the room quickly. A fellow student asked Cadell how he had known that Michelangelo was left-handed. Cadell confessed "I didn't know but nor did the president."

Only in 1908, between the death of his mother and that of his father (who was terminally ill), did he specifically seek a one-man-show, which he achieved at Doig, Wilson and Wheatley's gallery at 90 George Street in Edinburgh. Thirty paintings were sold, including four to his old schoolfriend, Patrick Ford, who became a major patron.

An inheritance following his father's death allowed him to buy a studio at 137 George Street in Edinburgh.

His new work did not sell well and he took 1910 "off", spending almost the whole year painting in Venice. Patrick Ford paid him £150 to take the trip, in exchange for the pick of the paintings produced. The exhibition of the results in 1911 sold poorly, only 3 oils and 3 watercolours, greatly discouraging Cadell's trust in the dealers. From 1911 until 1927 he sold only privately. However, Reid continued to buy a high proportion of his work.

Cadell spent much of his adult life in Scotland and had little direct contact with many of the new ideas that were being developed abroad. He therefore tended to use subjects and environments that were close at hand – landscapes, fashionable Edinburgh New Town house interiors, still life and figures in both oil and watercolour. He is particularly noted for his portraits of glamorous women whom he painted in a loose, impressionistic manner, depicting his subject with vibrant waves of colour. He enjoyed the landscape of Iona enormously, which he first visited in 1912 and features prominently in his work. During the 1920s he spent several summers with Samuel Peploe, another Scottish Colourist, on painting trips to Iona, and was also friends with the Scottish architect Reginald Fairlie.

Following the death of his close friend Ivor Campbell in World War I, he enlisted, serving in the 9th Argyll and Sutherland Highlanders and the 9th Royal Scots. Meanwhile. the influential art dealer Alexander Reid organised Cadell's first one-man-show at his gallery in St Vincent Street in Glasgow in February 1918. It is unclear if Cadell was present. In the army, Cadell created a series of drawings on the theme of "Jack and Tommy".

He lived at 6 and 22 Ainslie Place, Edinburgh from 1920 to 1932. During this time he befriended Reginald Fairlie who lived at 7 Ainslie Place and they remained friends thereafter. He then lived at 30 Regent Terrace from 1932 to 1935 where he found it more and more difficult to sell his paintings because of the economic climate. He finally moved to 4 Warriston Crescent where he died on 6 December 1937. He is buried with his family in Dean Cemetery. The grave lies on the southern boundary wall of the main cemetery. Although Cadell failed to make much income from his paintings it would be wholly wrong (as some claim) to say he died "in poverty". As his houses reflect, he was from a very wealthy family, and it is more correct to say he was largely financially supported by his family.

From 1923 to 1936, Cadell served as a Council member of the influential Edinburgh architecture, planning and amenity watchdog organisation, the Cockburn Association.

In 1932, Cadell was mugged, and in 1935 was severely injured in a fall from a tram car. He died of cancer in 1937.

Two of his paintings were offered for over £500,000 in 2009 and one (Reflection) was sold for £874,000 in 2018.

== Family ==
His sister was the actress Jean Cadell whose grandson Simon Cadell was also an actor. Both are buried with Cadell in Dean Cemetery.

== Gallery ==
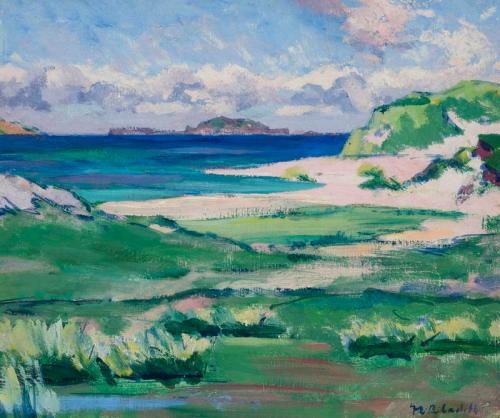
Lunga from Iona

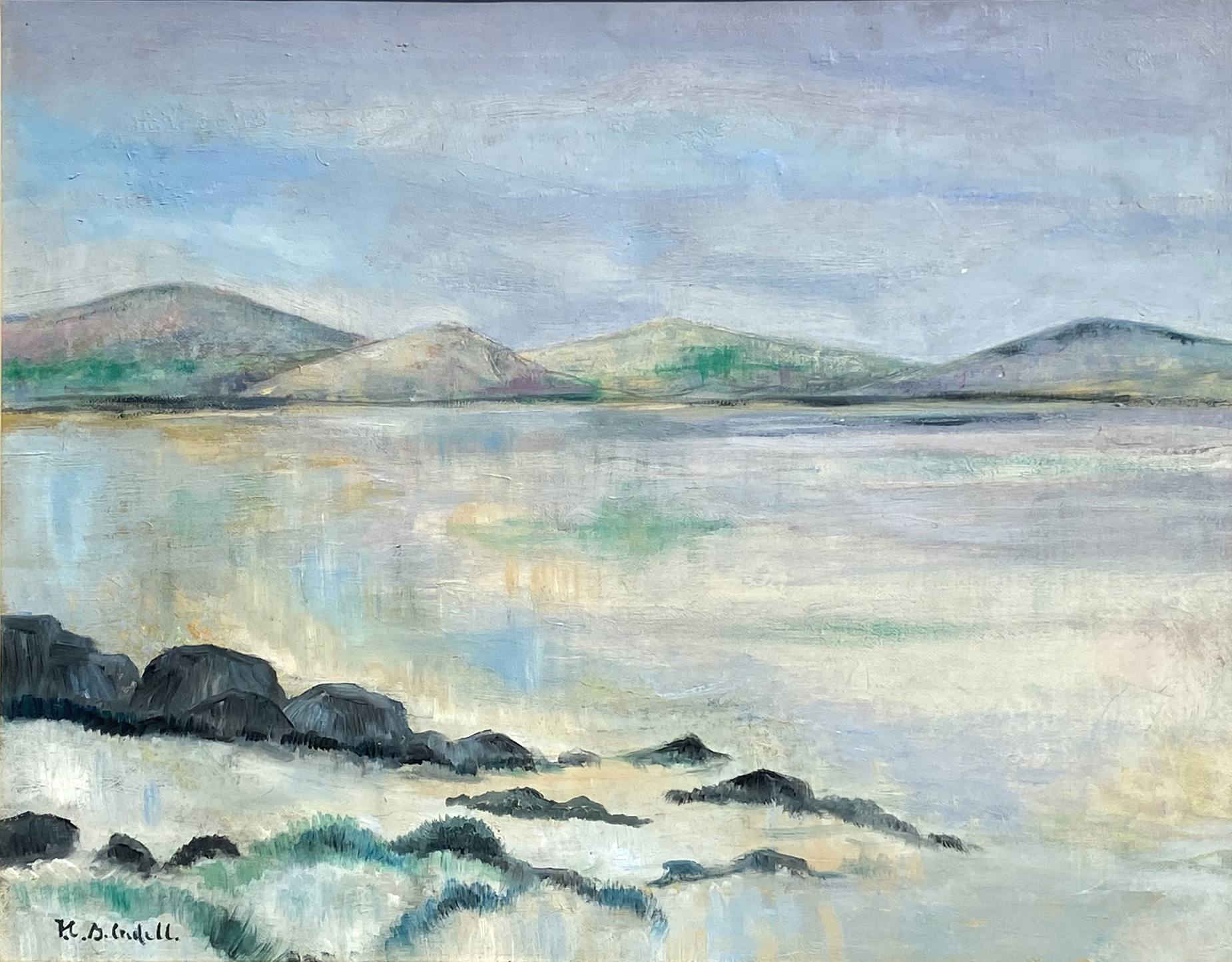
Landscape Iona, c.1930

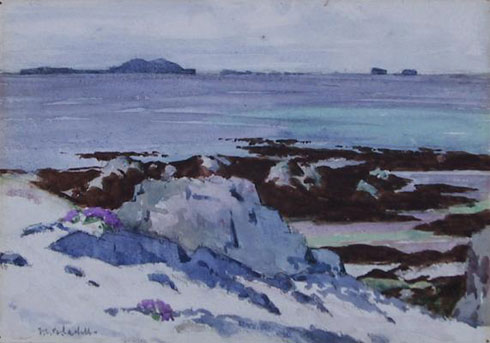
Iona, Looking North

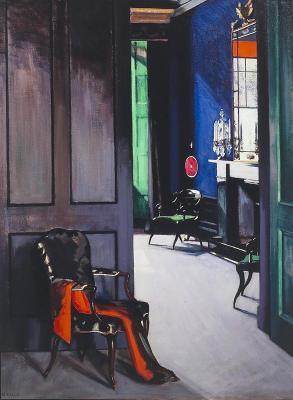
Interior with Opera Cloak

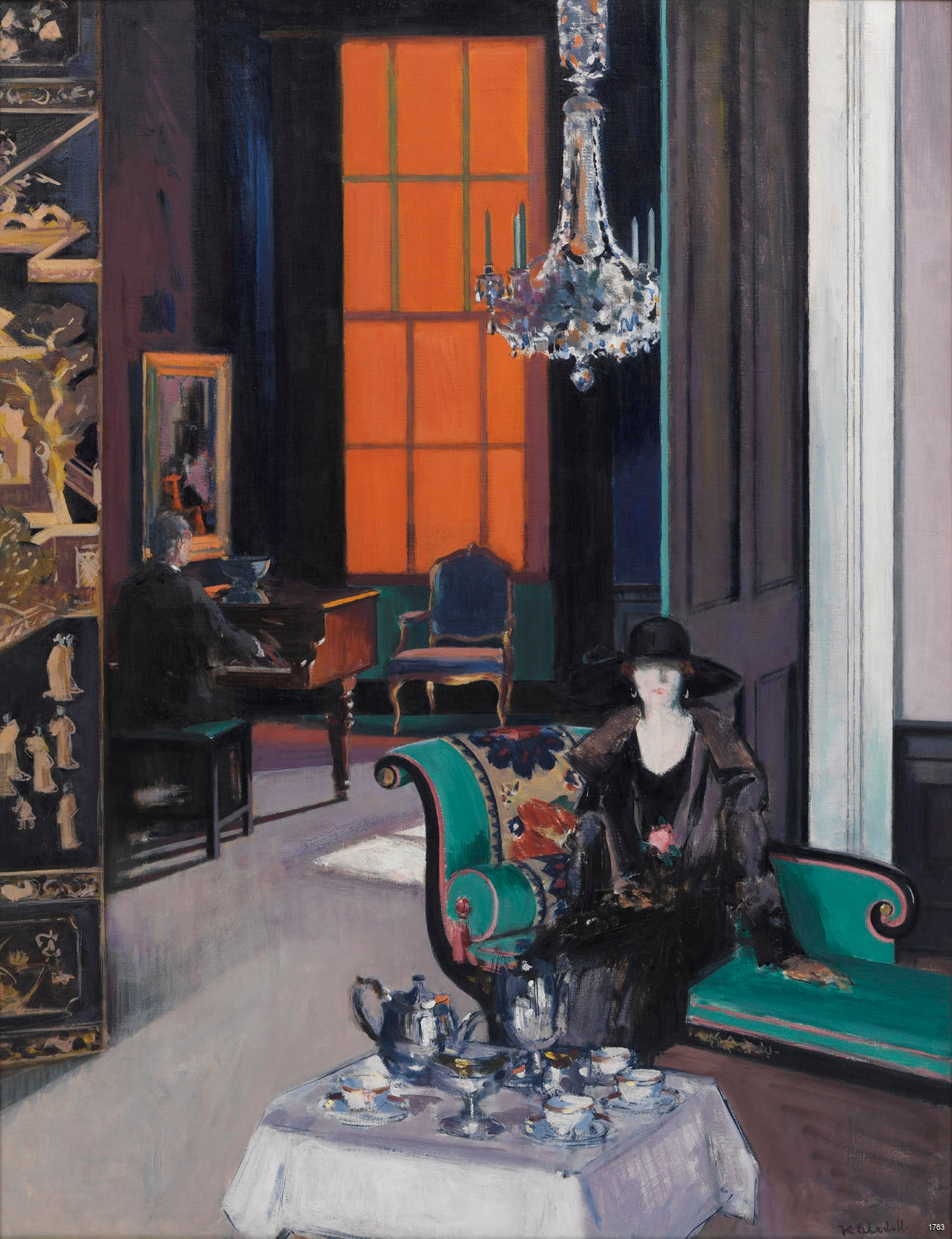
Interior, The Orange Blind, ca. 1914

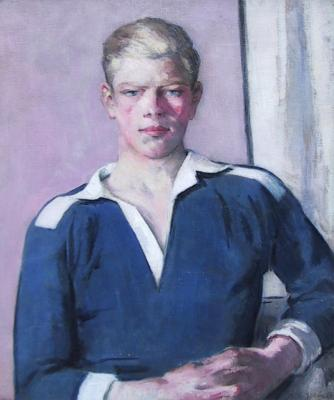
The Rugby Player

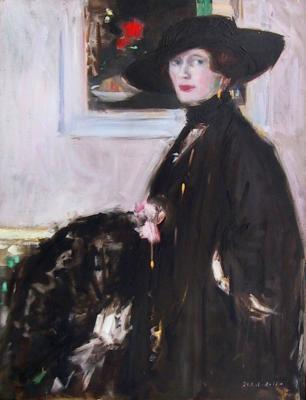
Black Hat, Miss Don Wauchope

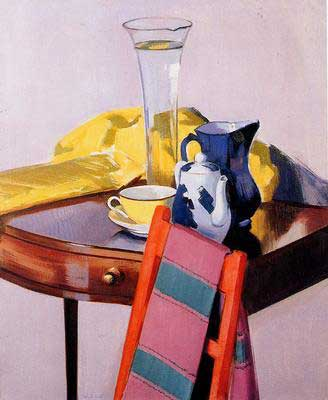
The Vase of Water, 1922

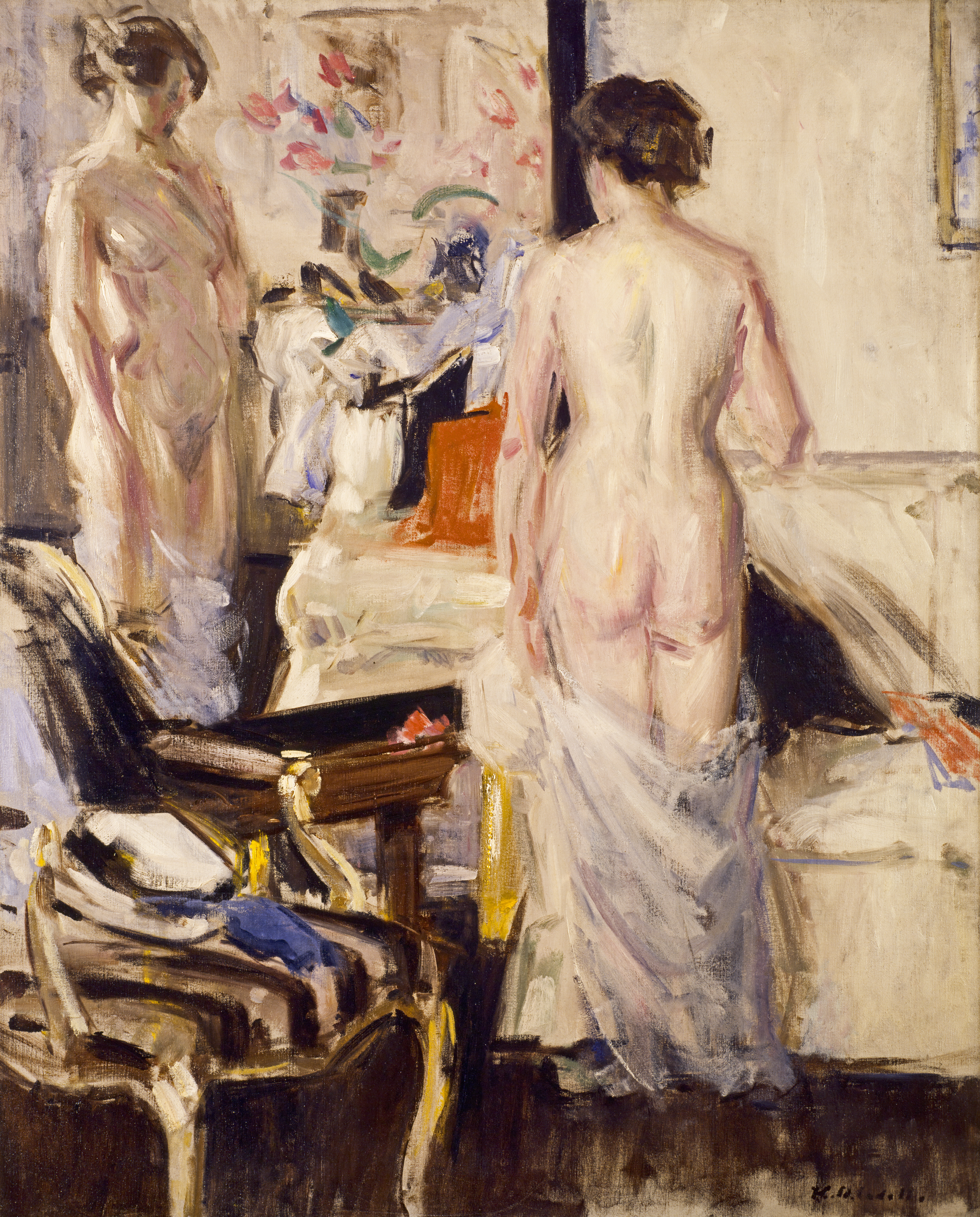
The Model, c. 1912

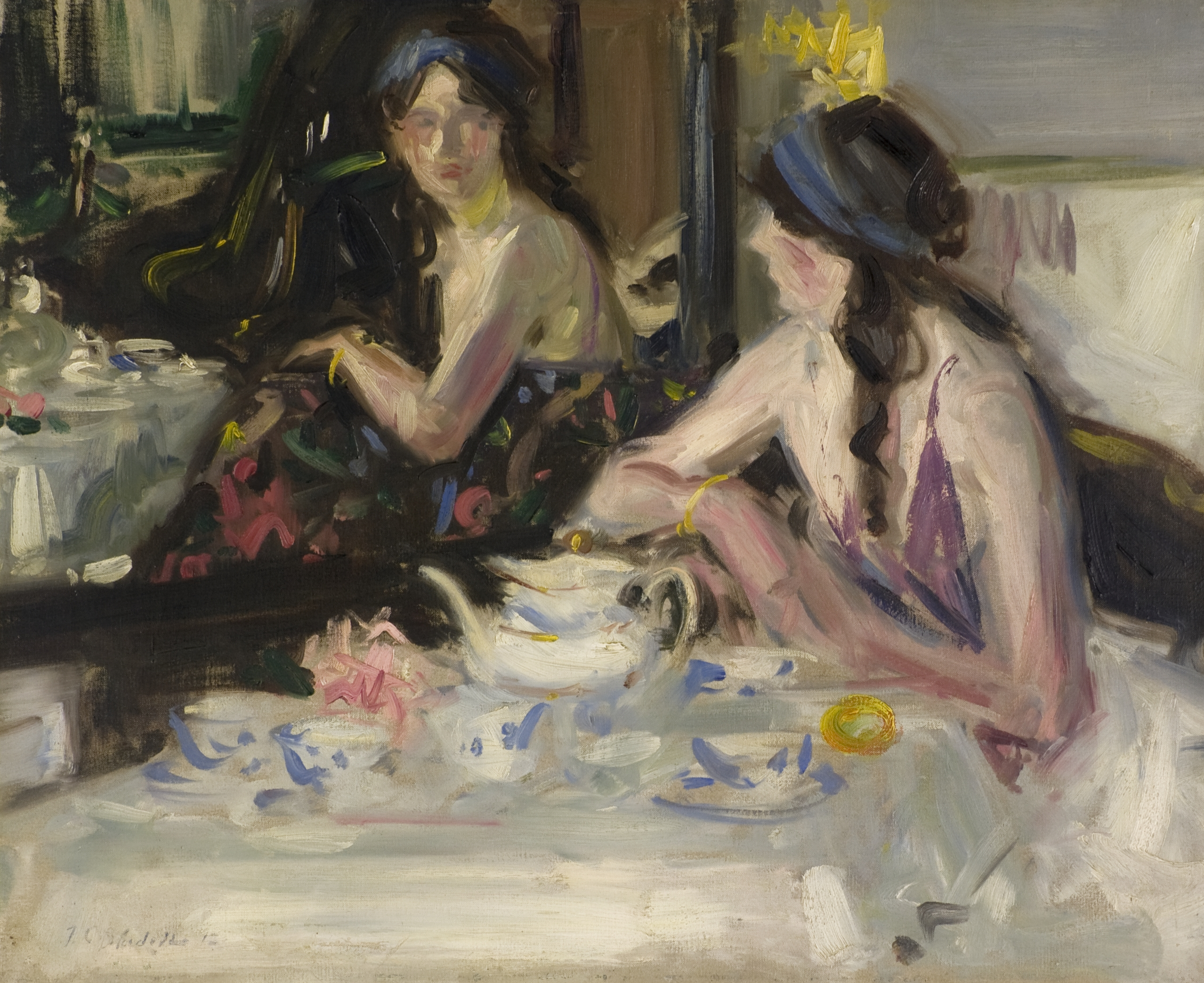
Cecilia No. 2, 1912

== See also ==
- Glasgow School
