= 1994 in British television =

This is a list of British television related events from 1994.

== Events ==
=== January ===
- 1 January – In the early hours of the morning, BBC2 airs the first Hootenanny which began late the previous evening. The annual New Year's Eve music show is hosted by Jools Holland and the first edition includes performances from Sting, the Gipsy Kings and Sly and Robbie.
- 2 January – BBC2 begins a repeat run of the 1960s US series The Fugitive.
- 3 January
  - TCI acquires a 60.4% stake in Flextech. This gives the company a 25% stake in UK Gold.
  - The network television premiere on ITV of the 1989 James Bond film Licence to Kill, starring Timothy Dalton.
- 4 January
  - Sky One moves E Street back to the 6:30pm weekday timeslot with the afternoon repeat shown the following day at 12:30pm, while Paradise Beach moves to 6pm and 12pm, thus creating an "Aussie Soap Hour" on the channel.
  - Debut of the military comedy-drama All Quiet on the Preston Front on BBC1.
  - The children's animated series Budgie the Little Helicopter, based upon a series of books by Sarah, Duchess of York, makes its debut on CITV.
- 5 January – "The Empath", an episode of the US sci-fi series Star Trek, is shown for the first time in the UK on BBC2, having not been seen on British television since the series original run on BBC1.
- 7 January
  - The Times reports that merger talks between Yorkshire Television and Tyne Tees have collapsed because it has proved impossible to reach an agreement on a suitable structure for the new company. Also, Anglia have withdrawn from the proposed alliance with London Weekend Television, making an LWT take over of YTV impossible.
  - ZZZap! returns for a new series on ITV with a new character called Daisy Dares You, played by Deborah McCallum; the part of Tricky Dicky and Smart Arty's segments have been updated with him using a magic pen to draw pictures that come to life.
- 8 January
  - The US sci-fi series The New Adventures of Superman makes its UK debut on BBC1, starring Dean Cain and Teri Hatcher.
  - BBC2 shows the network television premiere of the cult Japanese science-fiction animated film Akira.
- 10 January
  - The Welsh language soap opera Pobol y Cwm makes its debut in the rest of the UK when BBC2 begins airing episodes daily from Mondays to Thursdays. The series, shown with English subtitles, airs on BBC2 for three months, and on an experimental basis.
  - The classic children's series Rainbow is relaunched with a new format, made by Tetra Films by for HTV. However, the new series is not well received and is axed a year later and subsequently replaced by Rainbow Days.
  - American animated series The Ren & Stimpy Show makes its UK debut on BBC 2. Each episode is shown twice a week: first on Monday evenings as part of "yoof TV" strand DEF II; and as a regular programme on Friday nights.
- 12 January – Terror Towers debuts as a new Halloween-Themed game show on CITV before broadcasting the final series of Knightmare.
- 13 January – David Dimbleby takes over as host of Question Time on BBC1. He will continue to 2018 in the role.
- 14 January
  - An episode of the Channel 4 soap Brookside shows a lesbian kiss between two of its characters.
  - Fantasy Football League, hosted by David Baddiel and Frank Skinner, debuts on BBC 2.
- 15 January – Debut of the US police procedural series NYPD Blue on Channel 4, starring Dennis Franz, James McDaniel, Amy Brenneman and Nicholas Turturro.
- 16 January – The first episode of the archaeology series Time Team is broadcast on Channel 4, presented by Tony Robinson.
- 19 January
  - Whom Gods Destroy, an episode of the US sci-fi TV series Star Trek, is shown on BBC2 for the first time in the UK having not been seen on British television since the series original run on BBC1.
  - BBC2 debuts The Day Today, a comedy television show that parodies news, current affairs and various documentaries created by Armando Iannucci and Chris Morris, also starring Doon Mackichan, Patrick Marber, David Schneider, Rebecca Front and Steve Coogan (including his Alan Partridge character). Each episode is presented as a mock news programme, relying on a combination of ludicrous fictitious stories covered with a serious pseudo-professional attitude. The series ends on 23 February.
- 20 January – BBC1 airs an edition of Question Time from Birmingham which includes a confrontation between Jeffrey Archer and David Starkey over the age of homosexual consent.
- 27 January – The popular sitcom Absolutely Fabulous returns for a second series, now being shown on BBC1.

=== February ===
- 4 February
  - Following a review of the broadcasting ban on Irish terrorist-related organizations conducted by Heritage Secretary Peter Brooke, the Major government decides to maintain the status quo.
  - The US sitcom Home Improvement debuts in the UK on Channel 4, two years and five months after its American debut.
- 7 February – Granada Television increases its takeover bid for London Weekend Television to £774 million. However, the LWT board once again rejects the offer.
- 12 February
  - BBC1 airs Tunnel Vision: Le Walk, a special live coverage event presented by Mike Smith, Anthea Turner and Juliet Morris explores the 31-mile charity walk through the Channel Tunnel from France during the last eight hours led by Daley Thompson, Kriss Akabusi, Graham Gooch, Todd Carty and Nicholas Witchell, with Mr Blobby leading the celebration committee for those who have made it to England.
  - The light entertainment series Don't Forget Your Toothbrush makes its debut on Channel 4, presented by Chris Evans.
- 12–27 February – The BBC provides live and recorded coverage of the 1994 Winter Olympic Games from Norway. The majority of the coverage is shown on BBC2.
- 17 February – Series 9 of The Cook Report was due to premier on this day but it was pushed to the 12th of May due to Roger Cook sustaining injuries in a car accident on January 16.
- 18 February – Flextech buys a 20% stake in HTV, thereby clearing the company's debts.
- 19 February – The Independent reports that Anglia has been bought by MAI (owners of Meridian). MAI subsequently merges with United Newspapers to form United News and Media.
- 20 February
  - Debut of the children's consumer affairs series Short Change on BBC1.
  - The network television premiere of David S. Ward's 1991 American comedy King Ralph on BBC1, starring John Goodman, Peter O'Toole, Richard Griffiths, Joely Richardson and John Hurt.
- 25 February – LWT accepts a £770 million takeover bid from Granada, resulting in the departure of Greg Dyke and Sir Christopher Bland from the broadcaster.
- 28 February
  - HTV's main evening news programme Wales at Six is replaced by Wales Tonight.
  - The game show Talking Telephone Numbers makes its debut on ITV, presented by Phillip Schofield and Emma Forbes.
- February
  - The ITC decides to readvertise the Channel 5 broadcasting licence, but must first seek confirmation that the frequencies it planned to allocate to the channel are still available.
  - Pages from Ceefax broadcasts adopt the Level 2 teletext graphics. The change sees a significant expansion to the number of pages shown and title pages for each section return. However, the new expanded Pages from Ceefax broadcasts are confined to the 15 minutes prior to the start of programmes which often is insufficient time to show the entire sequence which is now between 40 and 50 pages in length.

=== March ===
- 4 March – The network television premiere on BBC2 of Laurel Avenue, the acclaimed US miniseries that tells the story of an eventful weekend in the lives of an extended African American family living in St. Paul, Minnesota. The second part is shown on 6 March.
- 5 March – The network television premiere of David Cronenberg's 1986 horror remake The Fly on ITV, starring Jeff Goldblum, Geena Davis and John Getz.
- 17 March – Robbie Williams and Mark Owen of Take That present an edition of Top of the Pops, becoming the first in a line of celebrities to guest present the show between 1994 and 1996 under the banner of "the golden mic".
- 18 March – The game show Play Your Cards Right returns to ITV after a seven-year break, with returning host Bruce Forsyth.
- 19 March – ITV airs the network television premiere of Paul Verhoeven's 1987 American science fiction thriller RoboCop, starring Peter Weller, Nancy Allen, Ronny Cox, Kurtwood Smith and Miguel Ferrer.
- 25 March – Lynne Perrie makes her final appearance as Coronation Street battleaxe Ivy Tilsley. The press later speculates that Perrie's decision to have plastic surgery without consulting her bosses was the reason for her departure, though Perrie denied this, insisting that she felt that her character had simply run its course. Ivy's death occurs off-screen the following year.
- 26 March – ITV's darts-based game show Bullseye is moved from Sunday afternoons to Saturday evenings.

=== April ===
- 2 April – Chris Evans opens the Saturday before Easter edition of Don't Forget Your Toothbrush with the words "It's that time of the year again when we remembered Jesus was crucified and it's that time of the week when we remember that Spurs probably have been too". The comments attract a complaint to the Broadcasting Standards Commission, which is subsequently upheld by the watchdog.
- 4 April – The network television premiere of David Zucker's 1991 American crime comedy sequel The Naked Gun 2½: The Smell of Fear on BBC1, starring Leslie Nielsen, Priscilla Presley, O. J. Simpson and George Kennedy.
- 7 April – BBC Scotland makes history by televising a criminal trial as part of its Focal Point strand.
- 9 April – The three-part adaptation of the Reginald Hill novel A Pinch of Snuff makes its debut on ITV, starring Gareth Hale and Norman Pace in the roles of detectives Dalziel and Pascoe. The series is shown over three consecutive Saturdays, but Hill is reported to be unhappy with the programme and prevents ITV from making any further series. In 1996, the BBC approaches Hill to make its own Dalziel and Pascoe series with Warren Clarke and Colin Buchanan in the leading roles, something to which Hill agrees.
- 10 April – The network television premiere of Martin Scorsese's 1990 American gangster thriller Goodfellas on Channel 4, starring Robert De Niro, Ray Liotta, Joe Pesci, Lorraine Bracco and Paul Sorvino.
- 11 April – BBC1 introduces a third weekly episode of EastEnders which airs on Mondays at 8pm. At the same time, a re-recorded version of the original theme tune is debuted to replace the "jazz" version which had been used since the previous May.
- 12 April – Paula Tilbrook makes her debut in Emmerdale as long-serving character Betty Eagleton.
- 14 April – American rock singer Meat Loaf guest presents an edition of Top of the Pops.
- 16 April – BBC2 celebrates its 30th birthday four days early with an evening of programmes selected and introduced by former controller David Attenborough. Among them are episodes of Elizabeth R and The Barry Humphries Show, a 1967 documentary about politics in India and a new episode of Call My Bluff.
- 18 April – The game show Blockbusters is relaunched on Sky One.
- 20 April – The popular US sitcom Frasier makes its UK debut on Channel 4, starring Kelsey Grammer, David Hyde Pierce, Jane Leeves, Peri Gilpin and John Mahoney.
- 25 April – ITV airs the Mr. Bean episode, Mind the Baby, Mr. Bean. It had originally been scheduled to air the previous February, but was pulled out of respect for the family of murdered toddler James Bulger prior to its originally planned transmission date.
- 30 April – Ireland's Paul Harrington and Charlie McGettigan win the 1994 Eurovision Song Contest (staged in Dublin) with "Rock 'n' Roll Kids".

=== May ===
- 1 May – BBC2 broadcasts live coverage of the San Marino Grand Prix, the third race of the Formula 1 season, in which former triple world champion Ayrton Senna is tragically killed in a high speed accident on the seventh lap of the race.
- 2 May – BBC2 airs Cry Freedom, Richard Attenborough's 1987 acclaimed drama about South African journalist Donald Woods.
- 3 May – Channel 4 starts airing Brookside on Tuesdays instead of Mondays, which means the soap is now seen on Tuesdays, Wednesdays and Fridays.
- 6 May – BBC1 broadcasts special live coverage for the opening of Channel Tunnel, as Queen Elizabeth II travels to Calais by train to be greeted by president François Mitterrand, to open the French terminal; they then journey on the Shuttle to Folkestone as they inaugurate the British end of the venture.
- 10 May – The launch of BBC Worldwide.
- 12 May
  - The European Commission of Human Rights rejects a legal challenge brought by the National Union of Journalists seeking to take the British government to court for breach of freedom of expression under the European Convention of Human Rights over the broadcast ban on Irish terrorist-related organisations.
  - The death of Labour Party leader and Leader of the Opposition John Smith who suffered a massive heart attack. This evening's edition of the BBC Nine O'Clock News is extended to an hour, meaning the following programme due to air at 9:30pm and coincidentally called Cardiac Arrest is postponed. Panellists on the evening's edition of Question Time, include George Robertson and Menzies Campbell as they depart from the usual political debate to pay tribute to Smith.
  - Comedian Jack Dee guest presents Top of the Pops.
- 19 May – Alice Cooper joins Bruno Brookes to present an edition of Top of the Pops.
- 22 May – Sky One airs the 100th episode of The Simpsons.
- 23 May – The BBC2 youth strand DEF II comes to an end after six years.
- 25 May – The game show Wipeout, created by Bob Fraser, makes its debut on BBC1, presented by Paul Daniels.
- 30 May – Release of the Comic Relief single "Absolutely Fabulous" by the Pet Shop Boys, named for the popular sitcom of the same name. The song reaches number six on the UK Singles Chart.

=== June ===
- 2 June – BBC1 airs a special D-Day edition of Blue Peter in which Anthea Turner travels to France to tell the story of the Normandy landings during World War II.
- 3 June – The original airdate of an episode of Have I Got News for You in which panellist Ian Hislop is suffering from appendicitis during recording. Having spent most of that day in hospital awaiting treatment, he had temporarily discharged himself to record the episode, before returning to undergo surgery.
- 5–10 June – Sue Lawley presents News '44, a series of news bulletin-style programmes to mark the 50th anniversary of D-Day.
- 6 June
  - Due to a failed satellite link, BBC1 is unable to broadcast a remembrance concert marking the 50th anniversary of D-Day. Instead, it is forced to show recorded highlights of D-Day commemoration events and a repeated Wildlife on One documentary about racoons. The concert, featuring Dame Vera Lynn and other stars from the QE2 off the Normandy port of Cherbourg, is recorded and shown three days later.
  - Scottish actor Mark McManus, best known for his portrayal of Glaswegian detective Jim Taggart, dies aged 59. The Taggart series continues under this name following his death without recasting the character.
- 9 June – Vic Reeves and Bob Mortimer guest present an edition of Top of the Pops.
- 12 June – The Independent on Sunday reports that Cable & Wireless are in the final stages of establishing a television service in the remote British Overseas Territory of Saint Helena, a nation that has not previously had access to television. Because of this, the introduction of television to the island is to be the subject of a study by British psychologist Dr. Tony Charlton of Cheltenham and Gloucester College of Higher Education to determine its effects on the island's culture and way of life.
- 16 June – Angus Deayton guest presents an edition of Top of the Pops.
- 17 June–17 July – The 1994 FIFA World Cup takes place in the United States but the BBC and ITV only show the majority of group stage matches in highlight form with viewers having to tune in to satellite channel Eurosport to see live coverage of those games.
- 18 June – The final episode of The Paul Daniels Magic Show is broadcast on BBC1 after fifteen years on the air.
- 19 June – The final episode of the long-running magazine programme That's Life!, presented by Esther Rantzen, is broadcast on BBC1 after twenty one years on the air.
- 20 June – The BBC's Arabic television service is launched with funding from the Saudi Arabian Mawarid Group.
- 21 June – BBC1 begins its Daily Detective season, a short season of episodes from 1980s US detective series. The first programme is an episode from Remington Steele with Pierce Brosnan and Stephanie Zimbalist. The season also includes episodes from Cagney & Lacey, aired on Mondays, Remington Steele on Tuesdays, Quincy on Wednesdays, Charlie's Angels on Thursdays and Moonlighting on Fridays. The season ends with Moonlighting on 30 September.
- 26–27 June – ITV airs the network television premiere of Kevin Costner's 1990 American western epic Dances with Wolves, which is showing over two consecutive nights.
- 29 June – ITV airs the 150-minute documentary Charles: The Private Man, the Public Role about Charles, Prince of Wales, presented by Jonathan Dimbleby. When asked if he had remained faithful to his wife (from whom he has been separated for two years), Charles responds "Yes [...] Until it became irretrievably broken down..." The broadcast is watched by 13 million people.

=== July ===
- 1 July – Launch of the BBC's Japanese News and Information Service.
- 3 July – Gerry Goldwyre wins the 1994 series of MasterChef on BBC1.
- 4 July – Debut of the comedy panel show Room 101 on BBC2, presented by Nick Hancock. Bob Monkhouse is the first guest to appear on the show.
- 6 July – Channel 4 moves into its new headquarters at 124 Horseferry Road, London.
- 7 July – Reg Presley of The Troggs co-presents Top of the Pops with Mark Goodier.
- 11 July – Following the death of screenwriter Dennis Potter in June, BBC1 begins reshowing his television serial drama The Singing Detective.
- 12 July – To coincide with the 2,000th episode of Neighbours, BBC1 airs Ramsay Street Revisited, an omnibus of the first five episodes of the soap from 1985.
- 14 July
  - Stephen Dorrell, the Secretary of State for Heritage, announces that Channel 35, one of the two frequencies planned for use by a fifth channel, will not be available. The ITC expresses concern over this, but still views Channel 5 as a viable option since 60% of the UK will still be covered by the remaining frequency.
  - BBC1 airs Episode 1000 of EastEnders and Episode 2000 of Neighbours.
- 16 July
  - John Finch, performing as Marti Pellow wins the fifth series of Stars in Their Eyes on ITV.
  - Debut of the game show Pets Win Prizes on BBC1, presented by Danny Baker and later Dale Winton.
- 17 July – BBC1 airs The Three Tenors in Concert 1994, recorded the previous night at the Dodger Stadium in Los Angeles as a prelude to the 1994 FIFA World Cup Final, and featuring Jose Carreras, Placido Domingo and Luciano Pavarotti. Because of vandalism to its power supply, the Hannington transmitting station in north Hampshire blacks out for an hour during transmission of the game.
- 21 July – Julian Clary guest-presents an edition of Top of the Pops.
- 24 July
  - Debut of the game show Small Talk on BBC1, presented by Ronnie Corbett.
  - The network television premiere of Richard Benjamin's 1990 American family comedy Mermaids on ITV, starring Cher, Bob Hoskins, Winona Ryder and Christina Ricci.
- 27 July
  - Debut of American comedy series Grace Under Fire on BBC2, starring Brett Butler.
  - BBC1 debuts The Human Animal, a six-part nature documentary series written and presented by Desmond Morris, described as "a study of human behaviour from a zoological perspective". Morris travels the world, filming the diverse customs and habits of various regions while suggesting common roots. The series ends on 31 August.

=== August ===
- 6 August – BBC1 screens part one of the two-part Hammer Horror documentary: Flesh and Blood, narrated by Christopher Lee and Peter Cushing. The second part is aired on 13 August.
- 11 August – Frazer Hines makes his final appearance in Emmerdale.
- 11–12 August – BBC1 airs a two-part adaptation of the Stephen King novel It.
- 14 August – Debut of Junior MasterChef on BBC1, presented by Loyd Grossman.
- 17 August
  - BBC1 airs The Best of 'Allo 'Allo!, a special 50-minute episode featuring a compilation of clips from the series linked by new scenes including Gorden Kaye and Carmen Silvera in which René and Edith reminisce about the events of the war.
  - The fourth episode of BBC1's The Human Animal includes sexually explicit scenes when it depicts a couple making love by using tiny endoscopic cameras placed inside both bodies to show intimate orifices. It also depicts the insertion of a man's erect penis into a woman's vagina and the subsequent orgasm. More than 12 million viewers watch the programme.
- 18 August – BBC1 airs Eric Till's 1992 two-part Canadian/American thriller To Catch a Killer, starring Brian Dennehy, Michael Riley and Margot Kidder, which is based on the true story of the pursuit of serial killer John Wayne Gacy. The second part concludes on 19 August.
- 18–28 August – The BBC broadcasts coverage of the 1994 Commonwealth Games from Victoria, Canada. Only the athletics events are shown live with all other sports, including swimming, restricted to highlights.
- 19 August – Sky Sports 2 launches, initially as a weekend-only service.
- 20 August – BBC2 airs Death on the Rock, a documentary by Thames Television about the shootings of three IRA members in Gibraltar, one of the most controversial programmes about the Troubles. The Government has succeeded in delaying its broadcast by six weeks and ten days later affects interviews with members of certain political groups in Northern Ireland.
- 22 August – The network television premiere of Graham Baker's 1988 American science fiction thriller Alien Nation on ITV, starring James Caan, Mandy Patinkin and Terence Stamp.
- 25 August – Malcolm McLaren guest-presents an edition of Top of the Pops.
- 27 August – BBC2 presents a night of programming dedicated to ATV.
- 29 August – Debut of veterinary-based television series Animal Hospital on BBC1, presented by Australian entertainer and singer Rolf Harris.
- 31 August – The Provisional IRA announced a "cessation of military operations" and declares its complete ceasefire from midnight in Northern Ireland on both television and radio.

=== September ===
- 1 September – Claire Sturgess guest presents an edition of Top of the Pops.
- 2 September – Television entertainer Roy Castle, who became best known to British viewers as the long-running presenter of the BBC children's series Record Breakers, dies from lung cancer at the age of 62.
- 3 September – The network television premiere of James Cameron's 1991 American science fiction blockbuster sequel Terminator 2: Judgment Day on BBC1, starring Arnold Schwarzenegger, Edward Furlong, Robert Patrick and Linda Hamilton.
- 5 September
  - UK Gold introduces new idents as part of the total rebrand which is based on the forging of bullion bars, with the station's logo appearing to have been stamped into gold.
  - The Children's BBC idents receive a refresh with new 3D graphics.
  - Sky One moves E Street to a 7pm weekday timeslot.
- 7 September – Debut on ITV of Police Camera Action!, at this time known as Police Stop!, presented by Alastair Stewart.
- 8 September
  - Brian Harvey and Tony Mortimer from East 17 guest present an edition of Top of the Pops.
  - BBC1 airs the first edition of 999 Lifesavers, the sister show to 999.
- 11 September – The network television premiere on Channel 4 of Tim Burton's 1990 American romantic fantasy Edward Scissorhands, starring Johnny Depp, Winona Ryder, Dianne Wiest, Anthony Michael Hall, Alan Arkin and Vincent Price.
- 12 September – The pre school children's programme Playdays moves to predecessor series Play School former slot on BBC2 after 6 years on BBC1 and including Play School's later years, 11 years. Series is still shown at existing time of 10am which will air among schools programmes. It would make a brief return to BBC1 in the summer of 1995 for the holidays.
- 14 September – The fantasy drama The Wanderer makes its debut on Sky One, starring Bryan Brown, Tony Haygarth, Kim Thomson and Otto Tausig. Every episode brings a new adventure about the story of long-ago brothers slowly unfolding to the present-day with searches for an ancient grave, a magic stone and a lost book of power. The series continues on 7 December.
- 15 September – The ITC announces its decision to readvertise the Channel 5 licence.
- 16 September
  - The restrictions that prevents radio and television broadcasting the voices of members of some Irish political and military groups are lifted in the wake of the Provisional IRA's ceasefire declaration.
  - BBC1 airs Tonya and Nancy: The Inside Story, a made-for-television biographical drama written by Phil Penningroth and directed by Larry Shaw, with Alexandra Powers as Tonya Harding and Heather Langenkamp as Nancy Kerrigan. The film focuses on the American figure skating scandal of the 1994 Cobo Arena attack during the extensive media coverage surrounding the infamous incident based on the public domain material.
- 17 September – BBC2 airs the first edition of Top of the Pops 2, a spin-off showing footage from present day editions of Top of the Pops as well as material from the series archive.
- 19 September
  - Release of The Cranberries single "Zombie", a song written about the 1993 IRA bombing in Warrington. The video is banned by the BBC because it contains images from the Troubles; instead, an edited version that focuses on the band's performance footage is released.
  - BBC2 launches a weekday afternoon business, personal finance and consumer news programme Working Lunch, which broadcasts for 42 weeks per year.
  - The US science-fiction drama series The X-Files makes its UK debut on BBC2, starring David Duchovny and Gillian Anderson.
- 21 September – University Challenge returns after a seven-year absence and two years after a special edition was shown; this revived series on BBC2 is presented by Jeremy Paxman.
- 22 September – BBC1 airs the Inside Story documentary Silent Twin – Without My Shadow, a film about June and Jennifer Gibbons, identical twins who became known as "The Silent Twins" because they communicated only with each other.
- 26 September – The network television premiere of Joe Dante's 1990 American comedy horror sequel Gremlins 2: The New Batch on ITV, starring Zach Galligan, Phoebe Cates, John Glover, Christopher Lee and Robert Picardo, with cameo appearances by film critic Leonard Maltin and professional wrestler Hulk Hogan.
- 27 September
  - The Australian drama series Heartbreak High makes its UK television debut on BBC2.
  - The comedy sketch series The Fast Show makes its debut on BBC2, starring Paul Whitehouse, Charlie Higson, Simon Day, Mark Williams, John Thomson, Caroline Aherne and Arabella Weir.
- 29 September
  - Claire Sturgess makes her second appearance as a guest presenter on Top of the Pops.
  - Chris Evans presents his final edition of The Big Breakfast on Channel 4 after two years as one of the show's original presenters which coincides with the second anniversary of the series.
- 30 September – Launch of the UK version of the music channel VH1.
- September – The Learning Channel is renamed to TLC.

=== October ===
- 3 October –
  - Two new channels, Sky Soap and Sky Travel go on the air. Both broadcast for a few hours during weekday daytime.
  - Debut of Spellbound on Sky One, an interactive game show hosted by Paul Coia in which viewers could play along at home to win a cash prize.
  - TLC launches on Astra and timeshares with Discovery, broadcasting daily from 9am until 4pm.
- 5 October –
  - The children's arts and crafts series SMart makes its debut on BBC1.
  - First edition of American talk show Ricki Lake on Channel 4.
- 6 October
  - The Central-produced soap Revelations makes its debut on ITV, a series about a clergyman and his family written by Russell T. Davies. The show, which is aired only in some ITV regions, runs for two series and features Davies' first gay character, a lesbian vicar named Joan, played by Sue Holderness who comes out during a two-hander episode with another female character.
  - The children's series Brum returns for a new series on BBC1.
  - Steve Punt and Hugh Dennis guest present an edition of Top of the Pops.
- 9 October – Debut of Seaforth, an epic love story beginning in World War II Yorkshire, starring Linus Roache and Lia Williams. The series concludes on 4 December.
- 17 October – The Morning on BBC1, a new weekday morning schedule of magazine, chat and entertainment programmes introduced by Mo Dutta, begins airing. The lineup includes Good Morning with Anne and Nick.
- 20 October – Jarvis Cocker of Pulp guest presents an edition of Top of the Pops.
- 21 October – The network television premiere on BBC1 of Ron Howard's 1991 American action thriller Backdraft, starring Kurt Russell and William Baldwin.
- 22 October
  - Yorkshire Television refreshes its ident and abandons the 1989 generic ITV look.
  - ITV airs the network television premiere of Jonathan Demme's 1991 Oscar-winning psychological thriller The Silence of the Lambs, which is based on Thomas Harris's 1988 novel of the same name, starring Jodie Foster, Scott Glenn, Ted Levine and Anthony Hopkins as the cannibalistic serial killer Hannibal Lecter.
- 24 October
  - Debut of the cookery competition Ready Steady Cook on BBC2, presented by Fern Britton.
  - The Sharongate storyline in EastEnders, centred on the character of Sharon Mitchell, played by Letitia Dean, reaches its conclusion. The episode is watched by 25.3 million viewers.
- 25 October – Fireman Sam returns to BBC1 with a new series, running for eight episodes, that day also saw the debuts of The Little Polar Bear & William's Wish Wellingtons.
- 28 October
  - ITV airs the last edition of Catchphrase to be produced by TVS, but it returns a week later, now made by Carlton Television and with a new look.
  - The US sitcom Ellen makes its UK debut on Channel 4, starring Ellen DeGeneres.
- 29 October – The network television premiere of the 1987 dystopian action thriller The Running Man on ITV, starring Arnold Schwarzenegger, Maria Conchita Alonso, Richard Dawson, Yaphet Kotto and Jesse Ventura.

=== November ===
- 1 November – A second attempt to license the fifth terrestrial channel begins.
- 3 November – Kylie Minogue guest presents an edition of Top of the Pops.
- 4 November
  - Leslie Crowther announces his retirement from showbusiness.
  - The network television premiere of Martin Scorsese's 1991 American suspense thriller remake Cape Fear on BBC1, starring Robert De Niro, Nick Nolte, Jessica Lange and Juliette Lewis, as well as Robert Mitchum, Gregory Peck and Martin Balsam who were also in the original 1962 version.
- 7 November – Barbara Windsor makes her EastEnders debut as Peggy Mitchell. The character had previously been played briefly by Jo Warne in 1991.
- 10 November
  - To coincide with the 20th anniversary of the disappearance of Lord Lucan following the murder of his children's nanny, ITV airs The Trial of Lord Lucan, a production by Granada which sees a fictional dramatization of how a trial against the peer might proceed.
  - The hugely popular sitcom The Vicar of Dibley makes its debut on BBC1, starring Dawn French as the vicar Geraldine Granger.
- 11 November
  - The BBC apologises after its Ceefax service mistakenly reports the death of the Queen Mother. The item, described as a rehearsal script, is on screen for 30 seconds before being removed. The Queen Mother later died on 30 March 2002.
  - The final episode of the children's adventure game show Knightmare is broadcast on ITV.
- 13 November – Katie Targett-Adams wins the 1994 series of Junior MasterChef on BBC1.
- 16 November – The network television premiere of Paul Verhoeven's 1992 American erotic thriller Basic Instinct on ITV, starring Michael Douglas and Sharon Stone. It is watched by 7.35 million viewers.
- 17 November
  - The final episode of the fourth series of Fireman Sam is broadcast on BBC1. It is also the final episode animated by Bumper Films and narrated by John Alderton.
  - Michelle Gayle guest presents an edition of Top of the Pops.
  - Series 10 of ITV's The Cook Report begins with an investigation into the controversial topic of cot deaths.
- 18 November – Debut of The Trial, a series of documentaries airing on BBC2 which were filmed largely inside Scottish courts in 1993 and early 1994. Filming of the series is possible because of the Criminal Justice Act 1925, the legislation banning photography in British courts does not apply in Scotland.
- 19 November – The first National Lottery draw is broadcast on BBC1, presented by Noel Edmonds.
- 20 November
  - The US series The Young Indiana Jones Chronicles makes its UK debut on BBC1. It initially airs on Sunday afternoons before switching to an early Saturday evening slot from January 1995.
  - The original airdate of the Everyman episode Portrait of a Serial Killer on BBC1 in which Lionel Dahmer talks about discovering that his son Jeffrey Dahmer was a serial killer.
- 26 November – BBC1 shows the documentary Girl Friday, in which Joanna Lumley spends nine days on a desert island with just a basic survival kit and a film crew.
- 27 November – Channel 4 airs the network television premiere of Peter Hewitt's 1991 American science fiction comedy sequel Bill & Ted's Bogus Journey, starring Keanu Reeves, Alex Winter, George Carlin, William Sadler and Joss Ackland.

=== December ===
- December – The final encrypted BBC Select broadcasts take place although the service will continue broadcasting unencrypted programmes for the next ten months.
- 1 December – The character Lily Savage guest presents an edition of Top of the Pops.
- 3 December – Comedian Larry Grayson makes his final television appearance at the Royal Variety Performance, recorded on 28 November. He has been absent from television for some years and makes a reference to this during his act, commenting to the audience, "They thought I was dead!". He dies a month later.
- 8 December – Neneh Cherry guest presents an edition of Top of the Pops.
- 15 December – Damon Albarn of Blur guest presents an edition of Top of the Pops.
- 17 December
  - BBC2 begins a season of films starring Burt Lancaster following his death in October, opening with Elmer Gantry, a 1960 film in which he stars alongside Jean Simmons.
  - BBC1 airs its first terrestrial television showing of Russell Mulcahy's 1992 crime thriller Blue Ice, starring Michael Caine, Sean Young, Ian Holm and Bob Hoskins.
- 20 December
  - The final episode of the animated children's series The Raggy Dolls is broadcast on ITV.
  - The network television premiere on BBC1 of Penelope Spheeris's 1992 American comedy Wayne's World, starring Mike Myers, Dana Carvey, Rob Lowe and Tia Carrere.
- 21 December – Frankenstein: The True Story is first broadcast on BBC One.
- 22 December – Gary Glitter guest presents an edition of Top of the Pops.
- 23 December – BBC1 airs Simply Red – Live, a concert given by the band in their home city of Manchester.
- 24 December – The final episode of The Generation Game to be presented by Bruce Forsyth is broadcast on BBC1; Jim Davidson will succeed him the following year.
- 25 December
  - Christmas Day highlights on BBC1 include the network television premieres of the 1990 animated film Jetsons: The Movie and the 1991 action adventure blockbuster Robin Hood: Prince of Thieves, starring Kevin Costner as Robin Hood and Alan Rickman as the Sheriff of Nottingham.
  - Take That guest present the Christmas Day 1994 edition of Top of the Pops.
  - The network television premiere of Walt Disney's 1959 animated musical fantasy classic Sleeping Beauty on ITV.
  - ITV airs its first Christmas episode of Heartbeat called "A Winter's Tale".
- 26 December – Boxing Day highlights on BBC1 include the network television premieres of Ivan Reitman's 1990 action comedy Kindergarten Cop and Barry Sonnenfeld's 1991 spooky comedy The Addams Family.
- 27 December – The network television premiere on BBC1 of the 1990 American action crime comedy Dick Tracy, starring Warren Beatty, Madonna and Al Pacino.
- 29 December
  - The final episode in the original run of the children's series Brum is broadcast on BBC1, but the show will return with a revamped series in 2001 and will continue being repeated on the BBC. It is also Toyah Willcox's final episode as narrator.
  - The network television premiere of In Bed with Madonna, a film following the singer Madonna during her 1990 Blonde Ambition Tour, which was broadcast on BBC2.
  - The final episode of the game show Strike It Lucky is broadcast on ITV; it will be relaunched in 1996 as Michael Barrymore's Strike It Rich.
- 30 December
  - The network television premiere of Dennis Dugan's 1990 American black comedy Problem Child on BBC1, starring John Ritter, Michael Oliver, Jack Warden, Gilbert Gottfried, Amy Yasbeck and Michael Richards.
  - One of the most famous moments in British television history occurs during ITV's Catchphrase: uncovering the answer "snake charmer" to the bonus round puzzle is done in such a way that causes the audience, the contestants and the host, Roy Walker, to laugh uncontrollably as it appears that Mr. Chips and the snake are doing something sexual.
- 31 December
  - New Year's Eve highlights on BBC1 include Barbra Streisand – The Concert, a performance given by the singer at Ponds, California earlier in the year.
  - New Year's Eve highlights on BBC2 include Plague and the Moonflower, a musical drama about the human race's abuse of the planet. There is also a special end-of-year edition of TOTP2 featuring highlights of the Christmas Day edition of Top of the Pops.

== Debuts ==
=== BBC1 ===
- 2 January – A Dark-Adapted Eye (1994)
- 4 January
  - All Quiet on the Preston Front (1994–1997)
  - Teddy Trucks (1994)
- 8 January
  - Eek! The Cat (1992–1997)
  - The New Adventures of Superman (1993–1997)
- 16 January – Headhunters (1994)
- 30 January – Incredible Games (1994–1995)
- 17 February
  - Nelson's Column (1994–1995)
  - Mud (1994–1995)
- 20 February – Short Change (1994–2005)
- 23 February – Earthfasts (1994)
- 13 March
  - Honey for Tea (1994)
  - Pie in the Sky (1994–1997)
- 14 March – Men of the World (1994–1995)
- 20 March – Ain't Misbehavin' (1994–1995)
- 24 March – Grushko (1994)
- 7 April
  - Secret Life of Toys (1994)
  - The House of Gristle (1994)
- 21 April – Cardiac Arrest (1994–1996)
- 27 April – The Lifeboat (1994)
- 3 May – Once Upon a Time in the North (1994)
- 25 May – Wipeout (1994–2003)
- 11 June – Fair Game (1994)
- 12 June – Love on a Branch Line (1994)
- 16 June – Roughnecks (1994–1995)
- 7 July – The Imaginatively Titled Punt & Dennis Show (1994–1995)
- 11 July – All Night Long (1994)
- 12 July – Chandler & Co (1994–1995)
- 16 July – Pets Win Prizes (1994–1996)
- 23 July – SWAT Kats: The Radical Squadron (1993–1994)
- 24 July – Small Talk (1994–1996)
- 27 July – The Human Animal (1994)
- 31 July – The Tales of Para Handy (1994–1995)
- 14 August – The Great Antiques Hunt (1994–2000)
- 29 August – Animal Hospital (1994–2004)
- 7 September – Common As Muck (1994–1997)
- 8 September – 999 Lifesavers (1994–1998)
- 12 September – Monster Cafe (1994–1995)
- 18 September – Paul Merton's Palladium Story (1994)
- 26 September – Nice Day at the Office (1994)
- 28 September – Dino Babies (1994–1996)
- 5 October – SMart (1994–2009)
- 6 October – Pirates (1994–1997)
- 9 October – Seaforth (1994)
- 25 October – William's Wish Wellingtons (1994–1996)
- 4 November – Harry Enfield and Chums (1994–1999)
- 10 November
  - The Vicar of Dibley (1994–2007)
  - Crocodile Shoes (1994)
- 13 November – Just William (1994–1995)
- 19 November – The National Lottery Draws (1994–2017)
- 20 November – The Young Indiana Jones Chronicles (1992–1993)
- 27 November – A Mind to Kill (1994–2004)
- 11 December – The Wimbledon Poisoner (1994)

=== BBC2 ===
- 1 January – Jools' Annual Hootenanny (1994–present)
- 6 January – The All New Alexei Sayle Show (1994–1995)
- 9 January – The High Life (1994–1995)
- 10 January – The Ren & Stimpy Show (1991–1996)
- 11 January – Look and Read: Earth Warp (1994)
- 12 January – Middlemarch (1994)
- 14 January – Fantasy Football League (1994–1996)
- 19 January – The Day Today (1994)
- 4 March – Laurel Avenue (1993)
- 8 May
  - Fievel's American Tails (1992)
  - Watergate (1994)
- 30 June – The Bots Master (1993–1994)
- 4 July – Room 101 (1994–2007)
- 5 July – Heretic (1994)
- 12 July – Floyd on Italy (1994)
- 27 July
  - Grace Under Fire (1993–1998)
  - Stages (Anthology series) (1994)
- 11 September – Bay City (1993)
- 16 September – Knowing Me Knowing You with Alan Partridge (1994–1995)
- 17 September – Top of the Pops 2 (1994–2017)
- 19 September
  - Working Lunch (1994–2010)
  - The X-Files (1993–2002, 2016–2018)
- 21 September – The Big Trip Travel Show (1994–1995)
- 27 September – The Fast Show (1994–1997, 2000)
- 9 October – The Busy World of Richard Scarry (1994–1997)
- 21 October – Young Jung (1994)
- 24 October – Ready Steady Cook (1994–2010)
- 6 November – Stone Protectors (1993)
- 7 November – Martin Chuzzlewit (1994)

=== ITV ===
- 4 January – Budgie the Little Helicopter (1994–1996)
- 5 January – 99-1 (1994–1995)
- 7 January – The Magic House (1994–1996)
- 10 January – Under the Hammer (1994)
- 12 January – Terror Towers (1994–1996)
- 14 January – Fantasy Football League (1994–1996, 1998, 2004)
- 17 January – Law and Disorder (1994)
- 6 February – Dandelion Dead (1994)
- 24 February – Animaniacs (1993–1998)
- 27 February – Anna Lee (1994)
- 28 February – Talking Telephone Numbers (1994–1997)
- 18 March – Chris Cross (1994–1995)
- 24 March – Outside Edge (1994–1996)
- 7 April
  - Stanley's Dragon (1994)
  - Class Act (1994–1995)
- 9 April – A Pinch of Snuff (1994)
- 10 April – The Knock (1994–2000)
- 17 April – The Cinder Path (1994)
- 13 May – Vanessa (1994–1998)
- 15 May – The House of Windsor (1994)
- 26 May – Moving Story (1994–1995)
- 29 May
  - Mother's Ruin (1994)
  - Cadfael (1994–1998)
- 31 May – Halfway Across the Galaxy and Turn Left (1994–1995) (Made in 1992)
- 20 June – Dr. Zitbag's Transylvania Pet Shop (1994–1997)
- 15 July
  - Arthur C. Clarke's Mysterious Universe (1994–1995)
  - Body Heat (1994–1996)
- 20 July – The Ink Thief (1994)
- 21 July – Downwardly Mobile (1994)
- 23 July – Scavengers (1994–1995)
- 19 August – Which Way to the War (1994)
- 7 September
  - Police Camera Action! (1994–2010)
  - Faith (1994)
- 22 September – Magic Adventures of Mumfie (1994–1998)
- 6 October – Revelations (1994–1996)
- 26 October – Ellington (1994–1996)
- 1 November – Ky's Cartoons (1994–1999)
- 10 November – The Trial of Lord Lucan (1994)
- 12 November – Open Fire (1994)
- 17 November – Finney (1994)
- 25 December – Mole's Christmas (1994)
- Unknown
  - The Little Mermaid (1992–1994)
  - Aladdin (1994–1995)

=== Channel 4 ===
- 11 January – Karachi Kops (1994)
- 15 January – NYPD Blue (1993–2005)
- 16 January – Time Team (1994–2014)
- 4 February – Home Improvement (1991–1999)
- 12 February – Don't Forget Your Toothbrush (1994–1995)
- 3 March – The Rector's Wife (1994)
- 8 April – Beavis and Butt-Head (1993–1997, 2011, 2022–present)
- 9 April – Emily's Ghost (1994)
- 20 April – Frasier (1993–2004)
- 16 May – Babylon 5 (1993–1998)
- 29 May – The Odyssey (1992–1994)
- 7 June – Little Napoleons (1994)
- 8 July – Madeline (1993–2001)
- 30 July – The People's Parliament (1994–1999)
- 3 August – Biker Mice from Mars (1993–1996, Channel 4, 2006–2007 CITV)
- 12 August – The World of Hammer (1994)
- 14 October – Paris (1994)
- 28 October – Ellen (1994–1998)
- 9 November – A Man You Don't Meet Every Day (1994)
- 27 December – The Mousehole Cat (1994)

=== Sky One ===
- 3 April – Highlander: The Series (1992–1998)
- 23 April – Kung Fu: The Legend Continues (1993–1997)
- 9 May – She-Wolf of London (1990–1991)
- 18 May – Angel Falls (1993)
- 28 June –The First Circle (1992)
- 14 September
  - One West Waikiki (1994–1996)
  - The Wanderer (1994)
- 2 October – Duckman (1994–1997)
- 3 October
  - Spellbound (1994–1996)
  - Space Precinct (1994–1995)
- 13 November – A Mind to Kill (1994–2002)
- 14 December – Scarlett (1994)

=== Sky Sports (1/2) ===
- 20 August – Soccer AM (1994–2023)

=== Nickelodeon UK ===
- 31 October – Aaahh!!! Real Monsters (1994–1997)

== Channels ==
=== New channels ===
Date	Channel
February	Travel
19 August	Sky Sports 2
30 September	VH1
3 October	Sky Soap
3 October	Sky Travel

== Television shows ==
=== Changes of network affiliation ===
Shows	Moved from	Moved to
Blockbusters	ITV	Sky1
Men Behaving Badly	ITV	BBC1
This Is Your Life	ITV	BBC1

=== Returning this year after a break of one year or longer ===
- 10 January – The new version of Rainbow (1972–1992, 1994–1997)
- 27 January – Ben Elton: The Man from Auntie (1990; 1994)
- 18 March – Play Your Cards Right (1980–1987, 1994–1999, 2002–2003)
- 18 April – Blockbusters (1983–1993, 1994–1995, 1997, 2000–2001, 2012, 2019)
- 5 September – The Russ Abbot Show (1980–1985; 1986–1991; 1994–1996)
- 21 September – University Challenge (1962–1987 ITV, 1994–present BBC)

== Continuing television shows ==
=== 1920s ===
- BBC Wimbledon (1927–1939, 1946–2019, 2021–present)

=== 1930s ===
- Trooping the Colour (1937–1939, 1946–2019, 2023–present)
- The Boat Race (1938–1939, 1946–2019, 2021–present)
- BBC Cricket (1939, 1946–1999, 2020–2024)

=== 1940s ===
- Come Dancing (1949–1998)

=== 1950s ===
- Panorama (1953–present)
- What the Papers Say (1956–2008)
- The Sky at Night (1957–present)
- Blue Peter (1958–present)
- Grandstand (1958–2007)

=== 1960s ===
- Coronation Street (1960–present)
- Songs of Praise (1961–present)
- World in Action (1963–1998)
- Top of the Pops (1964–2006)
- Match of the Day (1964–present)
- Mr. and Mrs. (1965–1999)
- Jackanory (1965–1996, 2006)
- Sportsnight (1965–1997)
- Call My Bluff (1965–2005)
- The Money Programme (1966–2010)

=== 1970s ===
- Emmerdale (1972–present)
- Newsround (1972–present)
- Pebble Mill (1972–1986, 1991–1996)
- Last of the Summer Wine (1973–2010)
- That's Life! (1973–1994)
- Wish You Were Here...? (1974–2003)
- Arena (1975–present)
- Jim'll Fix It (1975–1994)
- One Man and His Dog (1976–present)
- Grange Hill (1978–2008)
- Ski Sunday (1978–present)
- The Paul Daniels Magic Show (1979–1994)
- Antiques Roadshow (1979–present)
- Question Time (1979–present)

=== 1980s ===
- Family Fortunes (1980–2002, 2006–2015, 2020–present)
- Children in Need (1980–present)
- Danger Mouse (1981–1992, 2015–2019)
- Timewatch (1982–present)
- Brookside (1982–2003)
- Countdown (1982–present)
- Right to Reply (1982–2001)
- First Tuesday (1983–1993)
- Highway (1983–1993)
- Blockbusters (1983–93, 1994–95, 1997, 2000–01, 2012, 2019)
- Spitting Image (1984–1996)
- Surprise Surprise (1984–2001, 2012–2015)
- The Bill (1984–2010)
- Channel 4 Racing (1984–2016)
- Thomas the Tank Engine & Friends (1984–present)
- Busman's Holiday (1985–1993)
- EastEnders (1985–present)
- The Cook Report (1987–1999)
- Crosswits (1985–1998)
- Screen Two (1985–1998)
- Telly Addicts (1985–1998)
- Blind Date (1985–2003, 2017–2019)
- Comic Relief (1985–present)
- Beadle's About (1986–1996)
- The Chart Show (1986–1998, 2008–2009)
- Equinox (1986–2006)
- The Really Wild Show (1986–2006)
- Casualty (1986–present)
- Lovejoy (1986–1994)
- The Raggy Dolls (1986–1994)
- Allsorts (1987–1995)
- Going for Gold (1987–1996, 2008–2009)
- The Time, The Place (1987–1998)
- Chain Letters (1987–1997)
- ChuckleVision (1987–2009)
- You Bet! (1988–1997)
- Playdays (1988–1997)
- Wheel of Fortune (1988–2001)
- London's Burning (1988–2002)
- On the Record (1988–2002)
- Fifteen to One (1988–2003, 2013–2019)
- This Morning (1988–present)
- Fun House (1989–1999)
- Birds of a Feather (1989–1998, 2014–2020)
- A Bit of Fry & Laurie (1989–1995)
- Byker Grove (1989–2006)
- Desmond's (1989–1994)
- Bodger & Badger (1989–1999)
- Children's Ward (1989–2000)
- Mike and Angelo (1989–2000)

=== 1990s ===
- Waiting for God (1990–1994)
- Mr. Bean (1990–1995)
- The Crystal Maze (1990–1995, 2016–2020)
- Keeping Up Appearances (1990–1995)
- Turnabout (1990–1996)
- The Upper Hand (1990–1996)
- Drop the Dead Donkey (1990–1998)
- One Foot in the Grave (1990–2000)
- MasterChef (1990–2001, 2005–present)
- How 2 (1990–2006)
- Stars in Their Eyes (1990–2006, 2015)
- The Dreamstone (1990–1995)
- Rosie and Jim (1990–2000)
- Big Break (1991–2002)
- The Darling Buds of May (1991–1993)
- Spender (1991–1993)
- The House of Eliott (1991–1994)
- The Brittas Empire (1991–1997)
- Bottom (1991–1995)
- Soldier Soldier (1991–1997)
- Noel's House Party (1991–1999)
- 2point4 Children (1991–1999)
- Darkwing Duck (1991–1992)
- Little Dracula (1991–1999)
- Where's Wally?: The Animated Series (1991)
- GamesMaster (1992–1998)
- Heartbeat (1992–2010)
- Men Behaving Badly (1992–1998)
- The Big Breakfast (1992–2002)
- 999 (1992–2003)
- Sooty & Co. (1993–1998)
- Mr. Motivator exercise routines (1993–2000)
- Breakfast with Frost (1993–2005)

== Ending this year ==
- That's Life! (1973–1994)
- Jim'll Fix It (1975–1994)
- The Paul Daniels Magic Show (1979–1994)
- Postman Pat (1981, 1991–1994, 1996, 2004–2008)
- The Adventures of Sherlock Holmes (1984–1994)
- Lovejoy (1986–1994)
- The Raggy Dolls (1986–1994)
- Fireman Sam (1987–1994, 2003–2013)
- Knightmare (1987–1994)
- The New Statesman (1987–1994)
- Desmond's (1989–1994)
- Waiting for God (1990–1994)
- The House of Eliott (1991–1994)
- Brum (1991–1994, 2001–2002)
- Just Us (1992–1994)
- Anna Lee (1993–1994)
- Avenger Penguins (1993–1994)
- Rubbish, King of the Jumble (1993–1994)
- Under the Hammer (1994)
- The Rector's Wife (1994)
- Faith (1994)
- Once Upon a Time in the North (1994)
- Paul Merton's Palladium Story (1994)
- Seaforth (1994)
- The Wimbledon Poisoner (1994)

== Births ==
- 23 June – Jamie Borthwick, actor
- 28 June – Madeline Duggan, actress
- 6 July – Camilla and Rebecca Rosso, actress-singers
- 24 October – Kit Young, actor
- 17 November – Rose Ayling-Ellis actress
- 14 December – Kedar Williams-Stirling, actor

== Deaths ==
Date	Name	Age	Cinematic Credibility
3 January	Heather Sears	58	actress
5 January	Brian Johnston	81	sports commentator and television presenter
7 January	Llewellyn Rees	92	actor
10 January	Michael Aldridge	73	actor (Last of the Summer Wine)
22 January	Bill Podmore	62	television producer (Coronation Street)
15 March	Jack Hargreaves	82	television presenter (How)
18 March	Andrew Crawford	76	actor
29 March	Bill Travers	72	actor (Lovejoy) and scriptwriter
25 April	David Langton	82	actor (Upstairs, Downstairs)
27 April	Lynne Frederick	39	actress
6 June	Mark McManus	59	actor (Taggart)
7 June	Dennis Potter	59	scriptwriter
16 June	Eileen Way	82	actress
6 July	Geoff McQueen	46	scriptwriter
26 July	Terry Scott	67	actor
7 August	Larry Martyn	60	actor (Are You Being Served?, The Dick Emery Show, Whoops Baghdad)
11 August	Peter Cushing	81	actor (Sherlock Holmes)
15 August	Syd Dale	70	theme tune composer
2 September	Roy Castle	62	dancer, singer, comedian, actor, television presenter and musician
7 October	James Hill	75	television producer (Worzel Gummidge)
9 November	Ralph Michael	87	actor
16 November	Doris Speed	95	actress (Coronation Street)
13 December	Norman Beaton	60	actor (Desmond's)
5 December	Richard Waring	69	scriptwriter (Not in Front of the Children)
23 December	Sebastian Shaw	89	actor (The Old Curiosity Shop, Crown Court)
27 December	Fanny Cradock	85	television cookery presenter

== See also ==
- 1994 in British music
- 1994 in British radio
- 1994 in the United Kingdom
- List of British films of 1994
