= 'Allo 'Allo! series 9 =

'Allo 'Allo!
- Series 9
- No. of episodes: 6

Release
- Original release: 9 November – 14 December 1992

Series chronology
- ← Previous; Series 8

The ninth and final series of the British sitcom series 'Allo 'Allo! contains six episodes which first aired between 9 November and 14 December 1992.

Series 9 was the last series of the show, and contains the final regular episode (The Best of 'Allo 'Allo! aired some two years later; but was mostly made up of archive footage). Richard Gibson did not take part in the final series, so the character of Herr Otto Flick was taken over by David Janson.

The following episode names are the ones found on the British R2 DVDs with alternate region titles given below them.

== Episodes ==
No. overall	No. in series	Title	Directed by	Written by	Original release date
80	1	"Gone with the Windmill" "Fighting with Windmills"	John B. Hobbs	Jeremy Lloyd and Paul Adam	9 November 1992
Von Strohm and Gruber's escape attempt does not go to plan, and they return to Nouvion in disguise. Herr Flick has undergone plastic surgery in order to facilitate his escape to South America when the Allies invade. René is captured by the Communist Resistance again, leading the cafe staff to believe he is dead.: Note: This episode marks the first appearance of David Janson as Herr Otto Flick. The story of his plastic surgery was conceived to explain his altered appearance, when he was no longer being played by Richard Gibson.; Note: In this episode, series writer and creator Jeremy Lloyd has his one and only camera appearance as one of the Germans who show some interest in Gruber and Von Strohm when they are dressed as tarts.; Alternative title (R4): "The Windmill"
81	2	"A Tour de France" "Missing and Presumed Dead"	John B. Hobbs	Jeremy Lloyd and Paul Adam	16 November 1992
Louise, the leader of the Communist Resistance, is determined to keep René captive as her love slave. The cafe staff decide to hold a memorial service for René, who returns in the middle of the service, but not to the warm welcome he might have expected.: Note: This episode features the final appearance of Carole Ashby as Louise, a member of the communist resistance. She has a love affair with René.; Alternative title (R4): "Love Slave"
82	3	"Dead Man Marching" "René Artois Is Still Dead"	John B. Hobbs	Jeremy Lloyd and Paul Adam	23 November 1992
Michelle's latest plan is to take advantage of the belief that René is dead by sending him to England. Madame Fanny returns to Nouvion, but all is not well between her and LeClerc. ---: Alternative title (R4): "Amnesia"
83	4	"Tarts and Flickers" "The Fishmonger Float"	John B. Hobbs	Jeremy Lloyd and Paul Adam	30 November 1992
Michelle needs a pigeon to send microfilm to London. The cafe staff make plans for the fishmonger's parade, while General Von Klinkerhoffen makes plans to assassinate Hitler.: Alternative title (R4): "The Fishmonger's Parade"
84	5	"A Fishy Send-Off" "Sand Trap"	John B. Hobbs	Jeremy Lloyd and Paul Adam	7 December 1992
Monsieur Alfonse is sculpting a statue of René, but not without mishap. Colonel Von Strohm and Lieutenant Gruber decide that supervising the fishmonger's parade is the ideal excuse to get out of involvement in Von Klinkerhoffen's plans to assassinate Hitler. When the parade float reaches the coast, a German patrol vehicle commandeers the float so they can retreat – the Allied invasion has begun. The cafe staff are left to walk back to Nouvion in their costumes.: Alternative title (R4): "The Bugged Golf Club"
85	6	"A Winkle in Time" "The End of the War"	John B. Hobbs	Jeremy Lloyd and Paul Adam	14 December 1992
The cafe staff prepare to welcome the British troops, but do not bargain for seeing a couple of familiar faces. General Von Klinkerhoffen orders Colonel Von Strohm and Lieutenant Gruber to stay and fight to the end, so they decide to escape and hide – ending up at the cafe, walking into the attic bedroom just as René is making his final radio call to London. The Gestapo officers' attempts to escape prove fruitless, but Helga regains possession of her missing piece of the painting. Von Klinkerhoffen changes his mind and decides to formally surrender to the British at the cafe to spare the lives of the men under his command. All the Germans are rounded up and the British make themselves at home in the cafe. Many years later, an impressive car pulls up on the square, driven by the former Colonel. He's in the employ of Gruber, now a world-renowned art dealer, married to Helga. They greet the cafe staff, discussing how none of them ever found out what happened to the Fallen Madonna painting. Helga still carries her missing piece of the painting, and the rest is accidentally discovered to have been under their noses all these years. With the original painting, and a getaway car in the square, René decides that maybe it's not too late for him and Yvette to elope.: Note: This episode features a guest appearance of John D. Collins and Nicholas Frankau as Fairfax and Carstairs.; Note: In this episode, the date is revealed to be Tuesday 6 June 1944.
