= List of 'Allo 'Allo! characters =

This is a list of all main and recurring characters of BBC television's sitcom 'Allo 'Allo! that ran for 85 episodes from 1982 to 1992.

== Overview ==
Character	Portrayed by	Seasons									Best of	Return	Nationality
Character	Portrayed by	1	2	3	4	5	6	7	8	9	Best of	Return	Nationality
René Artois	Gorden Kaye	Main	Main	Main	Main	Main	Main	Main	Main	Main	Main	Main	French
Edith Melba Artois	Carmen Silvera	Main	Main	Main	Main	Main	Main	Main	Main	Main	Main		French
Yvette Carte-Blanche	Vicki Michelle	Main	Main	Main	Main	Main	Main	Main	Main	Main		Main	French
Maria Recamier	Francesca Gonshaw	Main	Main	Main									French
Mimi Labonq	Sue Hodge				Main	Main	Main	Main	Main	Main		Main	French
Michelle "of the Résistance" Dubois	Kirsten Cooke	Main	Main	Main	Main	Main	Main	Main	Main	Main		Main	French
Monsieur Roger Leclerc	Jack Haig	Main	Main	Main	Main	Main							French
Monsieur Ernest Leclerc	Derek Royle						M.						French
Monsieur Ernest Leclerc	Robin Parkinson							Main	Main	Main		Main	French
Monsieur Alfonse	Kenneth Connor	Main	Main	Main	Main	Main	Main	Main	Main	Main			French
Madame Fanny La Fan	Rose Hill	Main	Main	Main	Main	Main	Main	Main	Main	Main			French
Major-General Erich von Klinkerhoffen	Hilary Minster	Main	Main	Main	Main	Main	Main	Main	Main	Main			German
Colonel Kurt von Strohm	Richard Marner	Main	Main	Main	Main	Main	Main	Main	Main	Main			German
Lieutenant Hubert Gruber	Guy Siner	Main	Main	Main	Main	Main	Main	Main	Main	Main		Main	German
Captain Hans Geering	Sam Kelly	Main	Main	Main	R.			G.					German
Herr Otto Flick	Richard Gibson	Main	Main	Main	Main	Main	Main	Main	Main				German
Herr Otto Flick	David Janson									M			German
Herr Engelbert von Smallhausen	John Louis Mansi		R.	Main	Main	Main	Main	Main	Main	Main			German
Private Helga Geerhart	Kim Hartman	Main	Main	Main	Main	Main	Main	Main	Main	Main			German
Captain Alberto Bertorelli	Gavin Richards				Main	Main	Main						Italian
Captain Alberto Bertorelli	Roger Kitter							M					Italian
Officer (Captain) Crabtree	Arthur Bostrom		Main	Main	Main	Main	Main	Main	Main	Main		Main	British
RAF Flight Lieutenant Fairfax	John D. Collins	Main	Main	Main	Main	Main	Main	Main		G.		Main	British
RAF Flight Lieutenant Carstairs	Nicholas Frankau	Main	Main	Main	Main	Main	Main	Main		G.		Main	British

== René Artois ==
René Francois Artois (Gorden Kaye) – The local café proprietor who, whilst trying to remain impartial, has been dragged into the war by both sides. The Germans are threatening to shoot him if he does not secretly hide stolen valuables; the Resistance is using his café as a safe-house for shot-down British airmen; and on top of that, he is trying to keep his passionate love affairs with the café waitresses secret from his wife. Whenever his wife Edith catches him in the arms of another woman, René invariably responds with the phrase "You stupid woman! Can you not see that..." followed by a convoluted explanation, which Edith always believes, leading to an apology from her. René does not care much for his mother-in-law, often referring to her as a "silly old bat!" Each episode starts with scenery, costumes or props from the end of the previous episode, and (usually) René opens each episode with a monologue to the camera starting "You may be wondering why..." and proceeding to describe the situation he finds himself in, and to summarise the previous episode. Rene's only love is for his waitress/mistress Yvette Carte Blanche.

== Edith Artois ==
Edith Melba Artois (née La Fan) (Carmen Silvera) – René's wife, and the café's resident cabaret performer. However, her singing is so bad and tuneless (as René is once heard to comment: "my wife, who cannot carry a tune in a bucket...") that the cafe's customers stick cheese in their ears to block out the noise. Whilst René views her with disdain, she is also the subject of much romantic wooing by the local undertaker Monsieur Alfonse and the Italian Captain Alberto Bertorelli who wants to own the cafe. Although married to Rene, Edith spends most of the series posing as a wealthy available widow due to Rene's faked execution in Series 1. Rene (posing as his twin brother) is also forced to try and woo her again to regain control of his own business. Occasionally however there are hints of affection between the two, notably when reminiscing about their courtship. When Edith recreates their honeymoon dinner for their wedding anniversary Rene tells her "I don't deserve you" with apparent sincerity. Whenever she finds René embracing one of the waitresses, she usually asks "René! What are you doing 'olding that servant girl in your arms?". While René is constantly fêted as the 'hero of the resistance' it is usually Edith who comes up with the solution to any problem.

== Fanny La Fan ==
Madame Fanny La Fan (Rose Hill) – Edith's mother. She lives in an attic above the café, lying in bed wearing white nighties and a goffered cap. This is also where the British airmen and the radio (complete with "Ze flashing knobs!") are hidden. When she wants attention she bangs her walking stick on the floor, and cries out "Will nobody 'ear the cries of a poor old woman?" She is partial to a glass of gin, and occasionally fills in for her daughter as part of the café cabaret, although her singing is just as bad (if not worse). She also hates the Germans, as evidenced by saying "The Germans, I spit on zem", after which she actually spits, usually to the side of the bed. Her attitude towards M. Alfonse varies from one episode to the next, she often says that he would make a better husband for Edith than Rene, but she will also hurl pottery at him from her bedroom window because she does not like undertakers. In reality, the actress Rose Hill was only eight years older than Carmen Silvera, who played her daughter.

== Yvette Carte-Blanche ==
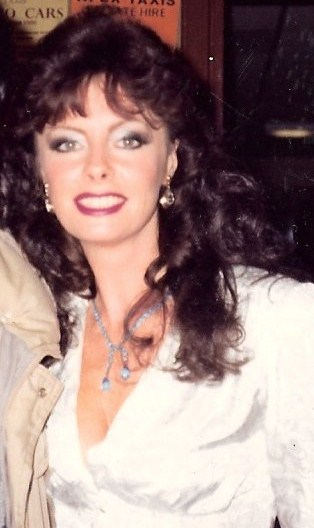
Vicki Michelle as Yvette Carte-Blanche in the 'Allo 'Allo! tour (1986)

Yvette Carte-Blanche (Vicki Michelle) – Head waitress at the café and René's mistress. She is passionately in love with René, and wants to elope with him to Geneva in Switzerland, but cannot do so because René has to stay with his wife. She is also responsible for 'entertaining' the German officers, upstairs at the café with wet celery and a flying helmet; and sometimes with an egg whisk (exactly how these accessories are used remains unclear). In her intimate moments with René, she throws her arms around him and rumbles an elongated, deep growl of "Ooooooh, René." Often clinched in the kitchen, "I was just 'anging up ze knockwurst when I remembered all ze 'appy times we 'ad in 'ere.". Yvette is also the only French character who seems able to understand Officer Crabtree's French.

== Maria Recamier ==
Maria Recamier (Francesca Gonshaw) (series 1 to 3) – Another waitress, who is also in love with René. She has no idea that René loves Yvette, and also believes that René should run away with her. She is short statured and many of the jokes play on her small size. "May I get you something...that is not on a high shelf?" When she speaks she has the tendency to spit when she rolls her "r"s. She disguises herself as a Red Cross parcel after sneaking into the British POW camp's mail room in the episode 'Camp Dance', but unfortunately gets sent back to Switzerland after failing to put enough stamps on.

It is heavily hinted that the waitresses supplement their income by prostitution with the Germans, and Yvette frequently entices Colonel von Strohm with the promise of using "the flying helmet and the wet celery". Precisely how these are to be used is never made clear.

== Michelle Dubois ==
Michelle "of the Résistance" Dubois (Kirsten Cooke) – Leader of the local "French Charles de Gaulle (the one with the big 'ooter) Résistance", she devises elaborate plans to help British airmen escape, and to blow up German ammunition trains and lorries. Whenever she concocts a plan, she gathers everyone around and issues her instruction, "Listen very carefully, I shall say 'zis only once!", followed by the vital information. Whenever her plans are thwarted by someone's stupidity, she rebukes that person, "You fool!" She pretends to fall in love with René, but only to stop him leaving the Resistance. Michelle is also the only French character in the series who speaks English (see Languages).

== Monsieur Roger Leclerc ==
Monsieur Roger Leclerc (Jack Haig) (series 1 to 5) – The Resistance's elderly forger, 'master' of disguises (all of them unconvincing), and café piano player. He is responsible for delivering to the café various goods such as batteries, bombs, and radio equipment. He does this in a variety of disguises, ranging from an onion seller to a lost mountain hiker. On delivery Leclerc always says, "It is I, Leclerc", accompanied by a raising of his glasses to reveal his identity. He seems to think that he is good at disguise even though he is always instantly recognisable; René once remarks: "Man of a thousand faces, every one the same!" and on another occasion, "I know. It is you. Leclerc." He is also the childhood sweetheart of Madame Fanny, and often pops up out of her bed whenever Fanny says "Ze flashing knobs!", only to be pushed back down. He is an escaped convict.

== Monsieur Alfonse ==
Monsieur Alfonse (Kenneth Connor) – "Alfonse, the half Belgian undertaker, swiftly and with style." He is in love with Madame Edith, often wooing her with flowers and the prospect of living above the mortuary. He has a serious heart condition, causing his "dicky ticker" to go into overdrive when he glimpses the women's underclothing. He often helps the Resistance. When he hears that René is to remarry Madame Edith he challenges him to a duel, from which René eventually escapes, disguised as a woman. René is thereafter proclaimed by Alfonse as the Hero of the Resistance – "The bravest transvestite in all France". Alfonse is later due to officiate at the remarriage of René and Edith himself, in his capacity as Deputy Mayor, only to faint due to his "dicky ticker". He has set up a tunnel from his mortuary to the British POW camp to smuggle in the airmen. Funds for the Resistance, borrowed from him, are forged by Leclerc on their return – unfortunately leading Alfonse to feel generous and spend the money on a party at the café.

== Major-General Erich von Klinkerhoffen ==
Major-General Erich von Klinkerhoffen (Hilary Minster) – A ruthless commander. He always threatens to have French peasants shot when the Resistance attacks the Germans. He occupies a rather grand château, where he is wooed by the serving girls as part of a Resistance mission to steal the knockwurst. He is later implicated in a plot to blow up Hitler, based on a conversation, misheard by the Gestapo, of a plan for a birthday party, with Hitler's painting at the head of the table, and the "blowing-up" is actually just the inflating of the balloons, by Lt. Hubert Gruber. Von Klinkerhoffen is almost universally disliked by von Strohm and the other Germans – who unsuccessfully plot his assassination on more than one occasion.

== Colonel Erik von Strohm ==
Colonel Erik von Strohm (Richard Marner) – The corrupt German town commandant. He is kept occupied by hiding valuable local paintings and antiques, which he intends to sell after the war. He frequently visits the café, where the waitresses provide him with much entertainment. He always gets René to do his dirty work, threatening him with the line "Othervise I vill have you shot!", with Captain Hans Geering agreeing in a high-pitched voice, "He vould, he did it before!" Hiding his baldness with a comb over, overweight, bumbling and greedy, the Colonel often promises René a cut of the profits but is quick to take them away. He exclaims with a big smug smile, "Ve are vinning ze var. I am a German officer and I can shoot anyone I like!". In episode 1 of series 8, Colonel von Strohm refers to himself as Erik, as he also does later on in the series, when calling his wife: "It's me, Erik!". In his pre-war life, he owned a gateau factory in the Black Forest.

== Lieutenant Hubert Gruber ==
Lieutenant Hubert Gruber (Guy Siner) – A German officer who has been reassigned following service on the Eastern Front. He is implied to be homosexual and seems to have a crush on René, although in the final episode he is revealed to have married Helga after the war. He is also responsible for forging certain pieces of art. He owns a "little tank" (which we later find out to be called Hubert Jr.), driven by the unseen Clarence. Gruber is in charge of the firing squad that shoots René (unbeknownst to Gruber, with blanks) and feels terribly guilty about the incident. He takes over from Captain Geering as the Colonel's assistant after the captain is captured by the British.

== Captain Hans Geering ==
Captain Hans Geering (Sam Kelly) (series 1 to 4, series 7) – Original assistant to Colonel von Strohm, he has various characteristics that run counter to the stereotype of a German officer (for example, he is not at all shocked to discover that his uniform is being made by a Jewish tailor). He frequently visits the café. He is mistaken for a British airman in 'Camp Dance' and sent to Britain. He returns briefly in one episode of series 7, having accidentally become a trusted member of Britain's intelligence service. He is astonished to discover that his friends René and Edith are actually the mysterious "Nighthawk", but is happy in his new life, having become a naturalised British subject. He is notable for his odd pronunciation of "colonel" which usually sounds like "Colon-Nell" (as if he were speaking French). Whenever the Germans have to salute the Führer, Geering often heralds him by saying "-tler!" instead of the full salute. In a 2007 BBC special, Kelly says about his character that "Hans was just too lazy to say the whole sentence". Rumours that the actor refused to give the regular salute are false. In the second series episode "Herr Flick's Revenge" and the third series episodes "Flight of Fancy", "Pretty Maids All in a Row" and "The Great Un-Escape", the Hans Geering character gives the full "Heil Hitler" salute. Kelly also went on to play Hitler himself in Stalag Luft in 1993.

== Herr Otto Flick ==
Herr Otto Flick (Richard Gibson, series 1 to 8; David Janson, series 9) – The local Gestapo officer who tries to show as little emotion as possible. He dresses in a long leather double-breasted coat over a pinstriped suit, with a wide-brimmed leather hat, leather gloves and octagonal steel-rimmed glasses. In the episode "Watch the Birdie" (series 5, episode 9), he is shown wearing an SS uniform with the insignia of Sturmbannführer, and he may actually hold that rank, given that he is the godson of Heinrich Himmler (whose telephone number, according to Herr Flick, is "Berlin 1"). He fancies the equally blonde Helga Geerhart, whom he plans to marry after the war. He has a considerably exaggerated limp, and frequently uses the word 'Gestapo' as an adjective: "My powerful Gestapo binoculars", "My Gestapo staff car" etc. In one episode he answers the phone by announcing himself as "Flick, the Gestapo"; after a short period, he is forced to explain to the caller that he said "Flick, the Gestapo" and not "Fick [German equivalent of the word 'fuck'] the Gestapo". Herr Flick often hits von Smallhausen on the head with his cane, saying "Wrong!" When Herr Flick wants Helga to kiss him, he will say in a stern manner "You may kiss me now!" In the episode "Pigeon Post", it is revealed that he has the same taste in undergarments as Helga. Inviting Helga to the Gestapo dance, he explains their song, which is sung to the tune of "Hokey-Cokey": "You put your left boot in! You take your left boot out! You do a lot of shouting and you shake your fists about! You light a little smokie and you burn down ze town! Zat's vot it's all about! Ahh... Himmler, Himmler, Himmler...". When Richard Gibson decided not to return for the final series, the change of actors was explained by Herr Flick having had plastic surgery to avoid capture by approaching Allied forces, rather than being a straightforward recast – such as when Roger Kitter replaced Gavin Richards as Captain Bertorelli.

== Private Helga Geerhart ==
Private Helga Geerhart (Kim Hartman) – the Colonel's secretary, and lover of Herr Flick. She is well-built, and known for a tendency to take off her clothes for tenuous reasons, showcasing a vast range of lingerie. She says, "When he's like this I always find it's best to strip off and ask questions later". When inquiring how they are going to be together after the war, he says: "I will take you for long walks on a short lead". Helga's attempts to seduce Herr Flick usually have no effect. Typically these include a particularly vigorous kiss. When announcing visitors to the Colonel's office, Helga always yells at the top of her voice, for example, "GENERAL VON KLINKERHOFFEN!" and "GO A-VAY!" Helga was a Lance Corporal for several episodes.

== Officers Fairfax and Carstairs ==
RAF Flight Lieutenants Fairfax and Carstairs (John D. Collins and Nicholas Frankau) (series 1–7, series 9) – Two British airmen who are trying to get back to the United Kingdom, their plane having been shot down. Emerging from where they are hiding, they say "Hello!" with an exaggerated upper-class English accent. When talking to one another, Fairfax or Carstairs always start with the words "I say, Fairfax/Carstairs...". On discovery of the tunnel to the British POW camp, all the café staff are trapped there, including the Resistance and the hostage German officers, who then all have to adopt exaggerated RP accents as POWs, with large moustaches and flying helmets. On inspection by the German camp guards, they stand to attention saying clichés like "Toodle pip! Good Show! Bang on! Old fruit!" Humour is also derived from the French not being able to understand what the British airmen are saying, in order to illustrate this, upper-class English accents and French accents are used to distinguish between the two languages. One of the minor characters of the show remarks on Fairfax and Carstairs' origin being from 402 Squadron, although in reality this was a Canadian RAF Squadron, whereas both characters are from England. In season 8, it is said that they have returned to England, but they return in the final season, having been captured by the Germans on D-Day.

== Herr Engelbert von Smallhausen ==
Herr Engelbert von Smallhausen (John Louis Mansi) (series 2 to 9) – Herr Flick's assistant. Dressed exactly like Herr Flick but much shorter, von Smallhausen copies Flick's exaggerated limp. He often suggests stupid plans and ideas, only for them to be put down by Herr Flick. He once delivered an out-of-date ransom note from the Resistance, saying "It vas tied around a brick and thrown at my head – I have only just regained consciousness!". On another occasion, he arrived at Herr Flick's dungeon and banged on the door without any response. The door then exploded and he entered over the wreckage to say apologetically "I forgot my key!"; Herr Flick then berated him for the misuse of Gestapo dynamite. Von Smallhausen is often sent on spying missions or to eavesdrop on the radio, but he likes listening to Tommy Handley. When hypnotised in one episode, he reveals that his real name is Bobby Cedric von Smallhausen. He studied at Oxford University some time before the war, making him (in Flick's view) a useful source of information about English culture.

== Officer Crabtree ==
Officer (Captain) Crabtree (Arthur Bostrom) (series 2 to 9) – A British spy posing as a French police officer. Unfortunately, his French is weak and he is invariably unable to use the correct vowel sounds, which means that sometimes he is quite incomprehensible, most famously in his usual greeting "Good moaning!" - which he is even heard to use at night. Despite this, the Germans never seem to suspect him. An examples would be: "I was pissing by the door when I heard two shats. You are holding in your hind a smoking goon. You are clearly the guilty potty!" After Crabtree is introduced in the series, Yvette frequently announces him as "That idiot British officer who thinks he can speak French". When Herr Flick and von Smallhausen comment on his strange accent, he tells them he's from "Nipples" (Naples). Additional explanation comes from Agent Grace who explains that when they were both training, "they trooned us to talk pish", i.e. posh.

== Mimi Labonq ==
Mimi Labonq (Sue Hodge) (series 4 to 9) – The replacement waitress for Maria, she is also short in stature. She is a member of the Resistance with a bloodthirsty hatred of the Germans, and a secret mission to kill the "German swines", often after wooing them – her address on her card is "straight up the stairs, first on the left past the linen cupboard". She also has a bit of a fancy for René.

== Captain Alberto Bertorelli ==
Captain Alberto Bertorelli (Gavin Richards, series 4 to 6; Roger Kitter, series 7) – An Italian officer who is seconded to Colonel von Strohm as liaison between the German and Italian forces in the prelude to the proposed invasion of Great Britain, and as a replacement for Captain Geering. He has an eye for the ladies and is known as a womaniser, often using the phrase "Da Beautiful-a Laydee. I kiss-a de hand-a". When saluting the Führer, Bertorelli instead says "Heil-a Mussolini", and when things go wrong he always says "What a mistake-a to make-a!" His Italian troops are unprofessional and always run away. In greeting, he kisses everybody except Gruber whom he knows about and so shakes his hand. Famously asked about his medals: "The first row are for service in Abyssinia. The second row are for service in North Africa". The last row? "They are for servicing Fiats!" Later he puts on a big feast for Madame Edith and is seen to put some of the olive oil on his hair.

== Monsieur Ernest Leclerc ==
Monsieur Ernest Leclerc (Derek Royle, [series 6]; Robin Parkinson, [series 7 to 9]) – This character was introduced to the series after the sudden death of Jack Haig (the actor who played Roger Leclerc), as his brother. He has many of the same characteristics, and is also a former childhood sweetheart of Madame Fanny. The character switch was explained by claiming that Roger had tried to get his brother out of prison, but ended up taking his place. When Royle died after only one series, the series' producers chose to replace him with a different actor playing the same character.

== Recurring characters ==
=== Leopold von Flockenstuffen ===
General Leopold von Flockenstuffen (Ken Morley) (series 5–7) – A German general, whose sexuality is similar to that of Gruber. At one point he has to take over command of the district when von Klinkerhoffen is considered to have gone completely mad. Ken Morley would later play a similar German general in the sci-fi comedy series Red Dwarf, where he (and his pet crocodile) encounter Ace Rimmer.

=== Denise Laroque ===
Denise Laroque (Moira Foot) (series 5) – Original leader of the Communist resistance and childhood sweetheart of René.

=== Louise ===
Louise (Carole Ashby) (series 5–9) – Later leader of the Communist resistance, she is also in love with René.

=== Henriette ===
Henriette (Phoebe Scholfield) (series 1–2 and 5–6) – in series 1–2, Michelle's assistant in the Resistance. Often appears alongside Michelle during attempts to save the British airmen. In series 5, Schofield appears as a member of the communist resistance, although her character is not named, and in series 6 she is seen again in Michelle's camp. It was never stated whether it was a different character, or the same character either going undercover or changing loyalties.

=== Corporal Caponi ===
Corporal Caponi (John Banks) (series 5–6) – Captain Bertorelli's second-in-command of the Italian troops stationed in Nouvion.

=== Private Elsa Bigstern ===
Private Elsa Bigstern (Louise Gold) (series 7) is Helga's replacement when she leaves for a course. She is a masculine type with red hair and a booming voice. She is young and eager, to the point of stunning General von Klinkerhoffen and Colonel von Strohm. She starts a relationship with Herr Flick, but seems the more dominant of the two, much to his disgust. When Helga returns, Elsa disappears without explanation.

=== Dr. LeConte ===
Dr LeConte (David Rowlands) (series 8–9) The local doctor in Nouvion, with asthma and in a worse state than anyone else in the town.

=== Clarence ===
Clarence – Lt. Gruber's tank driver. Drives Gruber's little tank quite often for him, but is never actually seen in the flesh. Gruber often gives him orders to drive the tank, and Clarence is sometimes mentioned by him while in René's café.

=== Madame Lennard ===
Madame Lennard – Aside from Clarence, Madame Lennard is the most frequently-mentioned unseen character. She works as a milliner and dressmaker. She models a see-through nightdress for Edith when she plans to remarry René, and René, who was looking through the keyhole, enjoys watching her as she is "very well arranged.". By series eight, Dr Le Conte does pregnancy tests for both the newly widowed Madame Lennard and Yvette; but the frogs he used for the pregnancy test jumped into each other's jars, meaning Yvette was not pregnant with René's child (as she had believed), meaning that Madame Lennard was pregnant out of wedlock.

== The Fallen Madonna (with the Big Boobies) ==
The Fallen Madonna (with the Big Boobies) by fictional artist van Klomp – the long-running gag of the series. It is a valuable portrait, the location and authenticity of which is a key concern to the other characters as the original changes hands frequently and there are various forgeries. Other antiques (such as a painting referred to as The Cracked Vase with the Big Daisies by Van Gogh, essentially one of the Sunflower paintings) occasionally crop up, but The Fallen Madonna frequently recurs throughout all of the series, often hidden in sausages or other guises. No-one ever knows who has the original. On one occasion, Herr Flick manages to get hold of three copies and comments "I have three Fallen Madonnas with six big boobies!" Shawn Moore, the production designer of 'Allo 'Allo, put his copy of this painting up for auction in 2007, where it fetched more than £4,000, which was donated to a children's charity.
