= Monsieur LeClerc =

Monsieur LeClerc is the name of two characters in the television series 'Allo 'Allo!:

- Monsieur Roger LeClerc
- Monsieur Ernest LeClerc, his brother and successor
