= Atul Kochhar =

British restaurateur

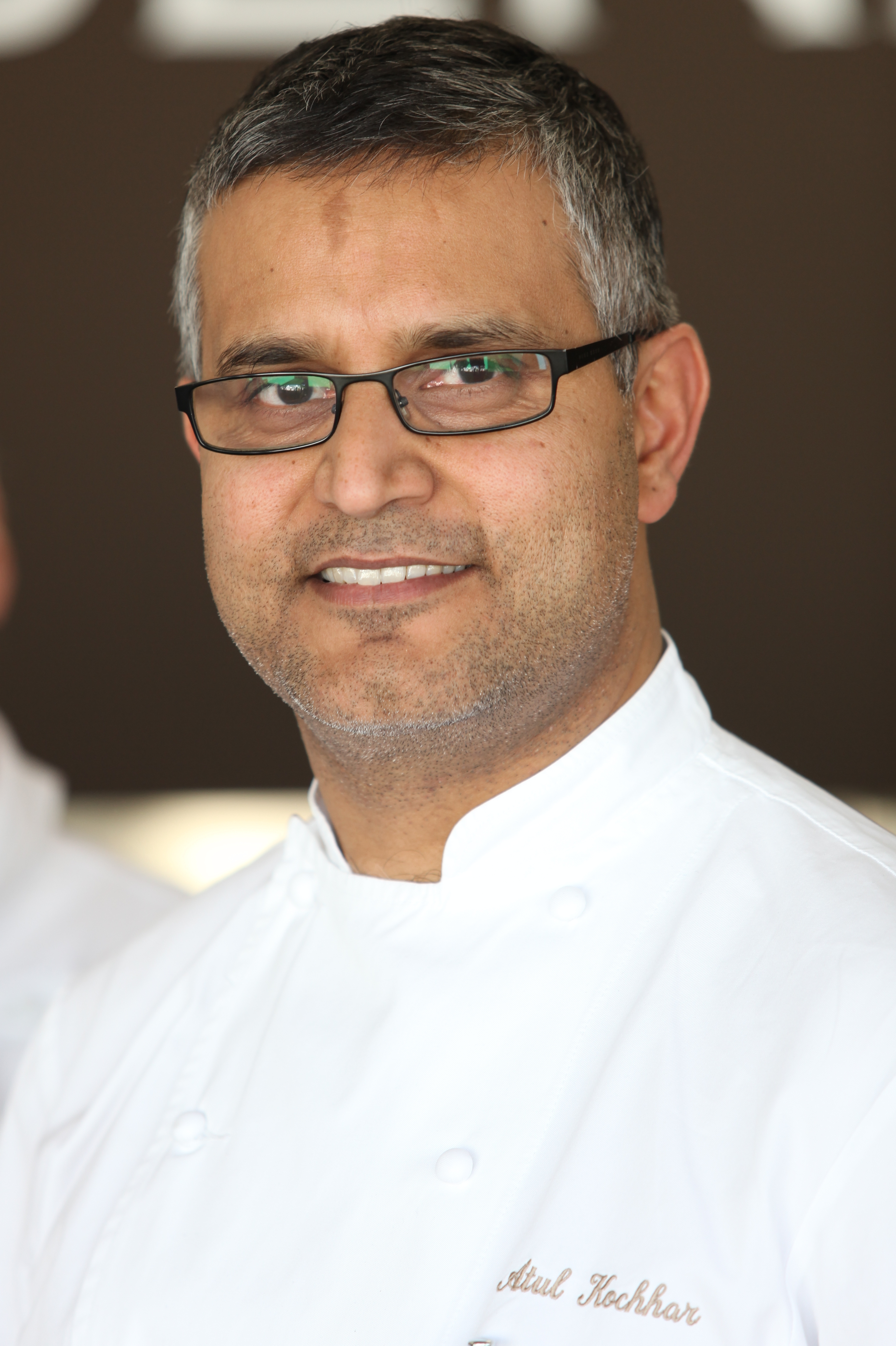
- Born: 31 August 1969 (age 56); Jamshedpur, India
- Education: The Oberoi School of Hotel Management
- Culinary career
- Cooking style: Indian
- Current restaurant(s): Kanishka Sindhu Indian Essence Riwaz Vaasu Masalchi Essence
- Website: Official website

Atul Kochhar is an Indian-born, British-based celebrity chef, restaurateur, television personality and writer. Kochhar is widely regarded as one of the most influential Indian chefs of all time and has been credited with changing the way Indian cuisine is perceived by the world.

He was the first ever Indian chef to receive a Michelin star, awarded in London in 2001 whilst at Tamarind. He later opened his own restaurant called Benares, which won him a second Michelin star in 2007. Since then he has opened several other restaurants, both in the United Kingdom and internationally including Kanishka in Mayfair, London.

Kochhar makes regular appearances on television shows, and has written a number of cookbooks: Curry Everyday, Simple Indian, Fish, Indian Style, Curries of the World, and 30 Minute Curries.

== Early life ==
Kochhar was born in Jamshedpur, India, and began his cooking career at The Oberoi Group of hotels in India (1989–1994). He gained his diploma in Hotel Management from The Institute of Hotel Management Chennai. In June 1993 Kochhar graduated to the five star deluxe Oberoi Hotel in New Delhi. Here he worked as a sous chef in one of the five restaurants in the hotel supervising a staff of 18 and immediately raising the standards in the kitchen.

In 1994 Kochhar moved to London to continue his cooking career at Tamarind in Mayfair and in January 2001 at the age of 31, Kochhar was the first Indian chef to be awarded a Michelin star, a milestone widely regarded as a turning point in the recognition of Indian cuisine at fine-dining level.

== Restaurants ==
Atul Kochhar has been involved in the opening, operation and development of numerous restaurants in the United Kingdom and internationally.

Restaurant	Location	Years	Notes
Tamarind	Mayfair, London, England	1994–2002	Kochhar served as head chef where he led the restaurant to becoming the first ever Indian restaurant to win a Michelin Star.
Benares	Mayfair, London, England	2003–2018	Kochhar opened his own award-winning restaurant on Berkeley Square where he won his second Michelin Star in 2007. He left the business in 2018 following a controversy.
Vatika	Wickham Vineyard, Hampshire, England	2008–2011	Restaurant at Wickham Vineyard; closed when the lease expired.
Ananda	Dundrum, Dublin, Ireland	2008–2010	Opened in partnership with the Jaipur Group; Kochhar exited in 2010.
Colony Bar & Grill	Marylebone, London, England	2010–2011	Modern European restaurant; Kochhar left after approximately 15 months.
Zafran	Dubai, United Arab Emirates	2010–2012	Indian restaurant chain launched with Landmark Group; Kochhar later parted ways with the brand.
Sindhu (P&O Cruises)	Azura and Britannia	2010–2018	Indian fine-dining concept developed for P&O Cruises.
Indian Essence	Petts Wood, Kent, England	2012–present	Suburban fine-dining Indian restaurant focusing on regional Indian cuisine.
Rang Mahal	JW Marriott Marquis, Dubai, United Arab Emirates	2012–2018	Flagship Indian restaurant at the JW Marriott Marquis; Kochhar was fired in 2018 following a controversy.
Simply India	St. Regis Mauritius Resort, Mauritius	2012–2014	Signature Indian restaurant at the resort; later rebranded.
Sindhu	Marlow, Buckinghamshire, England	2014–present	Fine-dining restaurant overlooking the River Thames.
Benares Madrid	Madrid, Spain	2015–2018	Spanish outpost of Benares; Kochhar exited in 2018.
NRI (Not Really Indian)	Mumbai, India	2016–2018	Restaurant focused on Indian diaspora cuisine; closed after two years.
Lima	Mumbai, India	2016–2018	Latin American-inspired restaurant launched during Kochhar's return to India.
Hawkyns	Amersham, Buckinghamshire, England	2017–2024	Modern British restaurant with Indian influences; closed in 2024.
Kanishka	Mayfair, London, England	2019–present	Kochhar's new flagship restaurant, opened on Mayfair's Maddox Street in March 2019 following his departure from Benares just months earlier.
Vaasu	Marlow, Buckinghamshire, England	2020–present	Kochhar's second restaurant in Marlow, paying homage to North Indian cuisine.
SAGA: Cuisines of India	Gurugram, India	2021–2024	Kochhar co-founded the restaurant and exited in 2024.
Mathura	Westminster, London, England	2021–2022	Restaurant at the former Westminster Fire Station; later rebranded.
Kanishka Kitchen	Heathrow Airport, Terminal 5, England	2021–2023	A spin-off on Kochhar's flagship restaurant Kanishka in Heathrow Airport's Terminal 5.
Masalchi	Wembley Park, London, England	2021–present	Casual dining concept inspired by Indian street food.
Riwaz	Beaconsfield, Buckinghamshire, England	2022–present	Restaurant inspired by Indian royal culinary traditions.
Essence at The Pantiles	Royal Tunbridge Wells, Kent, England	2024–present	Restaurant showcasing regional Indian cuisine in a historic setting.

In 2018, Kochhar faced public backlash after posting an Islamophobic tweet which he later apologised for and stated that his comments were "insensitive and wrong". His tweets were in response to Bollywood actress, Priyanka Chopra's role in the action series Quantico, following an episode which featured a terrorist plot devised by a group of Hindu nationalists.

As a result of this, the JW Marriott Marquis Hotel in Dubai terminated its partnership with him for the operation of their Rang Mahal restaurant, citing a misalignment with the hotel's values of diversity and inclusion.

Later that year, Kochhar also departed from his Michelin‑starred flagship restaurant, Benares in Mayfair after a 15-year tenure. This change was a huge shock for one of the best restaurants in London and Benares lost its Michelin Star just a few months after Kochhar's departure.

He has gone on to open several other restaurants alongside Kanishka since his departure from Benares including Masalchi in Wembley Park, Vaasu in Marlow, Riwaz in Beaconsfield and Essence in Royal Tunbridge Wells. These new openings as well as with his two older restaurants: Sindhu in Marlow and Indian Essence in Petts Wood have taken Kochhar's current portfolio to 7 restaurants in the United Kingdom.

== Media ==
Kochhar has been featured on BBC2's television series Million Pound Menu. He previously presented a series called Curry on with Atul Kochhar on the B4U network and a series on Malaysia called Kochhar's Spice Kitchen. Kochhar appeared in Masterchef Goes Large, season two and BBC2's Great British Menu in a bid to create a menu in honour of the Queen's 80th Birthday. He also appeared in Market Kitchen and Saturday Kitchen series 1–3.

== Personal life ==
Kochhar lives in West London and is married to his wife Deepti. Together they have a son called Arjun and a daughter called Amisha.

== Publications ==
- Fish, Indian Style (2008), Absolute, ISBN 9781904573838
- Atul's Curries of the World (2013), Absolute, ISBN 9781906650797
- Benares: Michelin Starred Cooking (2015), Absolute, ISBN 9781472900265
- Simple Indian (2016), Quadrille, ISBN 9781849498937
- 30 Minute Curries (2017), Absolute Press, ISBN 9781472937773
- Curry Everyday (2022), Absolute Press, ISBN 9781472985996
