= Works of Keith Floyd =

Keith Floyd (1943–2009) was an English broadcaster, restaurateur and food writer. He was brought up in Somerset, England, where his mother taught him to cook. He was educated at Wellington, a local public school, although he left at the age of sixteen. He joined the Bristol Evening Post as a cub reporter—where he worked alongside the future playwright Tom Stoppard. He was commissioned into the Royal Tank Regiment in 1963 as a second lieutenant, but his career there only lasted until 1966; he left military service and moved to London and then France, where he worked in several restaurants in various roles.

In 1971 he set up his first restaurant in Bristol—Floyd's Bistro—which proved popular enough for him to open three further outlets in the city. His burgeoning empire soon collapsed and he sailed around the Mediterranean for two years, from where he exported wine to the UK. He also opened a restaurant in the south of France, but this was also unsuccessful and it closed in 1979, when Floyd returned to the UK. He opened another Bristol-based restaurant and wrote a book—Floyd's Food—which was locally published in 1981; this led to a short recipe slot on the local Radio West station. In 1983 one of his customers—David Pritchard, a television producer—suggested to Floyd that he front a television series, which resulted in Floyd on Fish, broadcast on BBC Two in late 1985. Several series followed on the BBC before the Floyd-Pritchard partnership broke up in 1993; a corresponding book appeared with each series. There were no scripts for the programmes, and Floyd ad-libbed throughout; when he ran out of words, he would sip from an ever-present glass of wine to give him time to create the next line. Pritchard's directing style and Floyd's presentation technique produced what the food writer Tom Jaine considers as "cheerful mayhem", although viewers were educated in basic techniques. He went on to say that "Floyd's performances, on or near the stove, were a refreshing departure from the prissy, controlled style then in favour at the BBC, or the alternative mode of half an hour with a French chef whose incomprehensible English made the recipes a mystery."

Paul Levy, Floyd's obituarist, considered the broadcaster had "no outstanding talent, either as a cook or as a TV presenter, no great knowledge of his subject, or any apparent passion for anything but drink. This is not to say that his first TV programmes were bad – they were, indeed, highly diverting entertainment". The programmes were also highly popular both with the public and other cooks. Following his death of heart disease in September 2009 several fellow chefs voiced their opinions of him. Hugh Fearnley-Whittingstall considered that Floyd "cooked his ingredients with the love and passion of a gifted amateur", while Heston Blumenthal opined that "His enthusiasm, even when he was being a bit crotchety, jumped out of the screen. No one made TV food programmes quite like him. He had a wealth of knowledge but there was a no-nonsense approach to it all."

== Bibliography ==
=== Food and drink writing ===
Floyd's food and drink bibliography
Title	Year of first publication	First edition publisher (All London)
Floyd's Food	1981	Absolute Press
Floyd on Fish	1985	BBC Books
Floyd on Fire: Cooking Outdoors	1986	BBC Books
Floyd on France	1987	BBC Books
Floyd on Britain and Ireland	1988	BBC Books
A Feast of Floyd	1989	Bracken Books
Floyd's American Pie	1989	BBC Books
Floyd on Oz	1991	Michael Joseph
Floyd on Hangovers (Note: Co-written with David Pritchard.)	1992	Michael Joseph
Floyd on Spain	1993	Michael Joseph
Far Flung Floyd: Keith Floyd's Guide to Southeast-Asia Cooking	1993	Michael Joseph
Floyd on Italy	1994	Michael Joseph
The Best of Floyd	1995	Michael Joseph
Hot and Spicy Floyd	1996	Penguin Books
Floyd on Africa	1996	Michael Joseph
Cognac Cookery	1996	Penguin Books
Keith Floyd Cooks Barbies	1997	BBC Books
Floyd Uncorked	1998	HarperCollins
Floyds Fjord Fiesta	1998	Michael Joseph
Floyd on Fibre	1999	Kellogg's
Floyd Around the Med	2000	HarperCollins
Floyd's India	2001	HarperCollins
Flash Floyd	2002	Cassell
Floyd's Great Curries (Note: Co-written with Neil Barclay.)	2004	Cassell
Floyd's China	2005	HarperCollins
Floyd's Thai Food	2006	HarperCollins
A Splash and a Dash: Cooking with Keith Floyd	2006	Cassell

=== Other published works ===
Floyd's other publications
Title	Year of first publication	First edition publisher (All London)	Notes
A Pinch of Rosemary	1993	Boxtree	Foreword only; work by Carol Payne
Floyd in the Soup	1988	Pan Books	Autobiography
Out of the Frying Pan: Scenes from My Life	2000	HarperCollins	Autobiography
Stirred But Not Shaken	2009	Sidgwick & Jackson	Autobiography

== Television ==
Television appearances of Floyd
Programme	Date	Channel	Role	Notes	Ref.(s)
Floyd on Fish	14 November 1985 – 20 December 1985	BBC Two	Presenter	Seven programmes	
Pebble Mill at One	9 May 1986 – 16 May 1986	BBC One	Presenter	–	
Floyd on Food	23 September 1986 – 28 October 1986	BBC Two	Presenter	Six programmes	
Food and Drink	3 March 1987	BBC Two	Guest	–	
Floyd on France	1 September 1987 – 13 October 1987	BBC Two	Presenter	Seven programmes	
Vintage Floyd	12 November 1987 – 17 December 1987	BBC Two	Presenter	Six programmes; selected episodes from the previous two series	
Aspel and Company	23 January 1988	ITV	Interviewee	–	
Open Space	16 May 1988	BBC Two	Narrator	–	
Floyd on Britain and Ireland	30 August 1988 – 1 November 1988	BBC Two	Presenter	Nine programmes	
Floyd's American Pie	10 October 1989 – 14 November 1989	BBC Two	Presenter	Six programmes	
A Tale from the Riverbank	21 June 1990	BBC Two	Presenter	–	
Floyd on Oz	11 April 1991 – 6 June 1991	BBC Two	Presenter	Nine programmes	
The Garden Party	11 September 1991	BBC One	Guest	–	
Floyd on Spain	18 August 1992 – 29 September 1992	BBC Two	Presenter	Seven programmes	
Far Flung Floyd	13 July 1993 – 17 August 1993	BBC Two	Presenter	Seven programmes	
Floyd on Italy	12 July 1994 – 23 August 1994	BBC Two	Presenter	Seven programmes	
A Feast of Floyd	21 September 1994 – 9 November 1994	BBC Two	Presenter	Eight programmes; selected episodes from the previous series	
The Egg – a Wildlife Guide	17 April 1995	BBC One	Presenter	–	
Floyd on Africa	23 April 1996 – 4 June 1996	BBC Two	Presenter	Seven programmes	
Noel's House Party	4 January 1997	BBC One	Guest	–	
Floyd Uncorked	2 November 1998 – 21 December 1998	Channel 5	Presenter	Eight programmes	
Floyd on GMTV	16 November 1998 – 24 December 1998	ITV	Presenter	Twelve programmes	
Floyd Around the Med	5 January 2000 – 23 February 2000	Channel 5	Presenter	Nine programmes	
You Only Live Once	21 August 2000	BBC One	Guest	–	
Capital Floyd	4 December 2000 – 22 January 2001	Channel 5	Presenter	Seven programmes	
Floyd's India	29 October 2001 – 17 December 2001	Channel 5	Presenter	Eight programmes	
Open House with Gloria Hunniford	13 November 2002	Channel 5	Interviewee	–	
Floyd's Fjord Fiesta	December 2001 –	Sveriges Television (Sweden) and DR TV (Denmark)	Presenter	Seven programmes	
Diners Interactive	16 August 2003	BBC Three	Guest	–	
Balamory	1 October 2004	BBC One	Guest cameo	–	
Public Opinion	4 October 2004	BBC One	Panellist	–	
Full On Food Christmas Special	15 December 2004	BBC Two	Guest	–	
Keith and Keith	14 September 2009	Channel 4	Interviewee	Floyd interviewed by Keith Allen	

== Radio ==
Floyd's radio broadcasts
Broadcast	Date	Channel	Notes	Ref.
Woman's Hour	4 December 1981	BBC Radio 4		
The Archive Auction	7 May 1987	BBC Radio 4		
Some of These Days	9 November 1987	BBC Radio 2		
Down Your Way	15 November 1987 – 23 November 1987	BBC Radio 4	Four episodes	
Some of These Days	7 December 1987	BBC Radio 2		
Desert Island Discs	30 December 1990	BBC Radio 4		
Johnnie Walker's Countdown to Christmas	24 December 1993	BBC Radio 5 Live		
The Cookbook of Apicius	22 January 1997 – 5 March 1997	BBC Radio 4	Six-part series	
The Food Quiz	1 October 2003	BBC Radio 4		

== Stage ==
In 2006 and 2007, Floyd toured Britain with an unscripted, one-man show entitled Floyd Uncorked: The Life of a Bon Viveur.

== Notes and references ==
=== Sources ===
- Howard, David (December 2007). "The Cookery Books of Keith Floyd". The Book and Magazine Collector (289). Diamond Publishing Group.
- Levy, Paul (2013). "Floyd, Keith". Oxford Dictionary of National Biography (online ed.). Oxford University Press. doi:10.1093/ref:odnb/101691. ISBN 978-0-19-861411-1. (Subscription, Wikipedia Library access or UK public library membership required.)
