= The Wanderer (TV series) =

British fantasy drama television miniseries (1994)

- Genre: Fantasy drama
- Created by: Tom Gabbay; Roy Clarke
- Written by: Roy Clarke
- Directed by: Bob Mahoney (episode 1); Terry Marcel (episodes 2, 3 and 5); Christopher King (episodes 4 and 9); Alan Grint (episodes 6–8 and 12–13); Rick Stroud (episodes 10 and 11)
- Starring: Bryan Brown; Tony Haygarth; Kim Thomson; Deborah Moore; Otto Tausig
- Composers: Paul Hart; Joe Campbell; Bob Mahoney (vocals)
- Countries of origin: United Kingdom; Germany; Spain
- Original language: English
- No. of episodes: 13

Production
- Executive producers: Keith Richardson; Tom Gabbay
- Producer: Steve Lanning
- Production locations: Leeds (England); Salzburg (Austria); Munich (Germany); Soria (Spain); London (England); Scarborough (England)
- Running time: 55 minutes (including adverts)
- Production companies: FingerTip Films for Yorkshire Television and British Sky Broadcasting

Original release
- Network: Sky One
- Release: 14 September – 7 December 1994

Logo

The Wanderer is a fantasy drama television miniseries of a British origin, first transmitted on Sky One from 14 September to 7 December 1994, and comprising 13 hour-long episodes.

Every episode brings a new adventure, and the story of long-ago brothers Adam and Zachary, Princess Beatrice, and Lady Clare slowly unfolds as the present-day Adam searches for the original Zachary's grave, a magic stone, and a lost book of power.

== Premise ==
The central characters of the programme were created, and its core format was developed, by Tom Gabbay, who also served as executive producer of the series, which was filmed on locations in Austria, Germany, Spain, and England, including Chinatown in London, Helmsley Castle and the Yorkshire Moors, made by FingerTip Films (a partnership between Roy Clarke, who wrote the scripts, and producer Steve Lanning) for Yorkshire Television with British Sky Broadcasting (United Kingdom), ZDF (Germany), and Antena 3 (Spain). Bob Mahoney directed Rebirth, the first episode of the series.

In the United States, The Wanderer was transmitted primarily in first-run syndication.

=== Opening narration ===
Beginning for the first episode:

Long ago, at the end of the first millennium, twin brothers were born. In appearance, the twins were identical in every way. But below the surface, the spirits were not at all alike. At the time of their passage into manhood, each twin was given his birthright : Identical stones lay in the hilt of a shimmering sword, they were said to hold a unique power - the stone reveals the man - a power that would lay open the soul of the man who possessed it.

Beginning from episodes 2 to 13:

Long ago, when the line between good and evil was clearly drawn. Twin brothers faced each other in battle, good was triumphant and the knight buried his brother. Now, a thousand years later, the struggle continues...

== Plot summary ==
The shy multi-millionaire businessman Adam ("the Wanderer" of the programme's title) and his wicked twin brother Zachary (both played by Brown) are two former knights from the late 10th century during the Middle Ages at the end of the 1st millennium, both of whom have been born again (or reincarnated) in the late 20th century. Zachary is after a complicated revenge on Adam, who killed him in the year A.D. 1000, but much more is at stake than mere vengeance. As the turn of the 3rd millennium is approaching, people are growing more superstitious, and Zachary plans to use this for his own purpose. He needs his brother Adam dead, and Adam's death to be seen by witnesses, so he can pose as Adam resurrected.

The other players in both time-zones are Zachary's beautiful but deadly companion Beatrice (played by Thomson), Adam's friend Godbold (in the present day a philosophically-minded plumber and professional wrestler with a large beard, but once a hermit and monk, played by Haygarth), and Adam's 10th century lover Lady Clare (played by Moore). She has come back in the present day as Clare, a high-spirited photographer, and she does not plan to lose her man a second time.

Wolfgang Mathias (played by Tausig) is Adam's personal assistant. Unfortunately for him, as he himself has no roots in the 10th century, he finds virtually everything about the Wanderer's world extremely confusing.

== Cast ==
=== Main characters ===
Actor	Character
Bryan Brown	Adam/Zachary
Tony Haygarth	Godbold
Kim Thomson	Beatrice
Deborah Moore	Clare
Otto Tausig	Wolfgang Mathias

=== Notable guest stars ===
Actor	Character	Appearance
Tatjana Blacher	Inspector Mentzel	"Rebirth"
Alexander Stebele	Forster	"Mind Games"
Ann-Kathrin Kramer	Kiara	"Mind Games"
August Schmölzer	Kurt	"Mind Games"
Jan Biczycki	Oskar	"Bridges"
Uwe Ochsenknecht	Brandt	"False Witness"
Felipe Jiménez	Fatso	"Clare"
Pedro Bea	Skinny	"Clare"
Fernando Hilbeck	Clare's father	"Clare" • "Everybody Must Get Stoned"
Isabel Prinz	Clare's mother	"Clare" • "Everybody Must Get Stoned"
Debora Izaguirre	Loura	"Everybody Must Get Stoned"
Pablo Scola	Pascual	"Everybody Must Get Stoned"
Burt Kwouk	Ling Fat	"A Dragon by Any Other Name"
Choy Ling Man	Sun Li	"A Dragon by Any Other Name"
K.C. Leong	Wen	"A Dragon by Any Other Name"
Mark Burns	Sir Niles	"Home"

== Episode list ==
No.	Title	Directed by	Written by	Original release date
1	"Rebirth"	Bob Mahoney	Roy Clarke	14 September 1994
2	"Mind Games"	Terry Marcel	Roy Clarke	21 September 1994
3	"Bridges"	Terry Marcel	Roy Clarke	28 September 1994
4	"False Witness"	Christopher King	Roy Clarke	5 October 1994
5	"Castle Takes Knight"	Terry Marcel	Roy Clarke	12 October 1994
6	"Clare"	Alan Grint	Roy Clarke	19 October 1994
7	"No Bull"	Alan Grint	Roy Clarke	26 October 1994
8	"Everybody Must Get Stoned"	Alan Grint	Roy Clarke	2 November 1994
9	"A Dragon by Any Other Name"	Christopher King	Roy Clarke	9 November 1994
10	"See No Evil"	Rick Stroud	Roy Clarke	16 November 1994
11	"Waste Not, Want Not"	Rick Stroud	Roy Clarke	23 November 1994
12	"Home"	Alan Grint	Roy Clarke	30 November 1994
13	"Knight Time"	Alan Grint	Roy Clarke	7 December 1994

== Home media availability ==
ITV Studios Home Entertainment, owners of the copyright to The Wanderer, were not known to have released it on home media in any format as of the beginning of August 2014.

== Reception ==
TV Zone magazine, surveying the ratings for TV shows aired on Sky One, noted that The Wanderer's debut episode was watched by 0.46 million UK viewers. Subsequently, the show's episodes had lower ratings, gaining fewer viewers than Sky One's showings of Star Trek: The Next Generation and Highlander: The Series. The magazine concluded "Unless it [The Wanderer] performs well in other territories, a long life is not expected". According to TV historian Milly Buonanno, The Wanderer was "an absolute failure according to audience ratings". Unhappy with the show's performance, ZDF ceased showing The Wanderer after the third episode.

== See also ==
- Middle Ages in popular culture
- Reincarnation in popular culture
- 1994 in British television
