= Tom Gabbay =

United States novelist and screenwriter (born 1953)

Tom Gabbay (born April 1, 1953) is a United States novelist and screenwriter, best known for the Jack Teller series of historical spy thrillers.

Gabbay was born in Bloomington, Indiana. In his early career, he contributed political cartoons to the Philadelphia Daily News, produced films for the children's television series, Sesame Street, and was a program executive for NBC Television. He has also written a number of screenplays and was creator and Executive Producer of the 1990s television series The Wanderer.

== Books ==
- Access Point: A Psychological Thriller (2020) ISBN 9780061188602
- The Tehran Conviction (2009) ISBN 9780061188602, OCLC 607535384
- The Lisbon Crossing (2008) ISBN 9780061188442, OCLC 156818171
- The Berlin Conspiracy (2006) ISBN 9780727866295, OCLC 488650182

== Screen ==
- The Princess Stallion (1997) - screenwriter
- The Wanderer (1994) - creator and executive producer
