= 'Allo 'Allo! series 8 =

'Allo 'Allo!
- Series 8
- No. of episodes: 7

Release
- Original network: BBC1
- Original release: 24 December 1991 – 1 March 1992

Series chronology
- ← Previous; Series 7 Next → Series 9

The eighth series of the British sitcom series 'Allo 'Allo! is preceded by a Christmas special which aired on 24 December 1991. That episode, "A Bun in the Oven", was followed by 7 regular episodes first aired between 12 January and 1 March 1992. The series was repeated between 14 September and 2 November 1992 when the 9th and final series started on 9 November of that year.

Series 8 marks a change in the series. Rather than continuing to tell the story from the end of the seventh series, the first episode picks up the story some two years later. This sees the departure of the two British airmen and Bertorelli from the series. John B. Hobbs became the producer for the show.

In this series the letters in the initial credits were yellow instead of white like all earlier series. As in the previous season, there was no exclamation mark when the title "'Allo 'Allo" was shown on screen.

The following episode names are the ones found on the British R2 DVDs with alternate region titles given below them.

== Episodes ==
No. overall	No. in series	Title	Directed by	Written by	Original release date
1	72	"A Bun in the Oven"	John B. Hobbs	Jeremy Lloyd & Paul Adam	24 December 1991
It's 1943, the Italians have withdrawn, and the British Airmen are back in England. The Germans are still in Nouvion, but the war is not going well for them. René is pleased to say that all is back to normal, when Yvette announces to him that she is pregnant. Helga steals the Fallen Madonna from Herr Flick's quarters on behalf of the German officers, but ensures she is not left out of the action.: Note: In this episode, Paul Cooper, unseen as the voice of London Calling, is credited over a clip showing the chamber pot speaker rather than the usual text-only attribution.
2	73	"Arousing Suspicions"	John B. Hobbs	Jeremy Lloyd & Paul Adam	12 January 1992
A tour by a group of Spanish Flamenco dancers provides the ideal cover for René and the cafe staff to search the chateau for radio parts which were erroneously dropped down the chateau's chimneys from an Allied plane.: Note: In this episode, Colonel von Strohm erroneously refers to himself as "Erich" (when speaking on the telephone), even though it has been established earlier in the series that his first name is "Kurt".
3	74	"A Woman Never Lies"	John B. Hobbs	Jeremy Lloyd & Paul Adam	19 January 1992
The Gestapo give Helga a truth serum to extract all the information she has about the paintings. The cafe staff and the Resistance set about making their first propaganda radio broadcast.
4	75	"Hitler's Last Heil"	John B. Hobbs	Jeremy Lloyd & Paul Adam	26 January 1992
It's René's birthday, and the cafe staff have a few surprises in store for him. General Von Klinkerhoffen announces that Hitler and Goering are to visit the town on a morale-boosting tour of the coast.: Note: This episode reveals that Fanny was born in 1856.; Note: Hitler's double is played by David Janson, who would later play Herr Flick in series 9.
5	76	"Awful Wedded Wife"	John B. Hobbs	Jeremy Lloyd & Paul Adam	2 February 1992
Michelle's plans to assassinate Hitler and Goering are in progress. Helga has a plan to get Herr Flick and Von Smallhousen out of jail. René has to come up with a plan to get out of marrying Edith.
6	77	"Firing Squashed"	John B. Hobbs	Jeremy Lloyd & Paul Adam	16 February 1992
Colonel Von Strom and Lieutenant Gruber, disguised as Hitler and Goering, have been captured by the Communist Resistance. Under the impression that they are the real Hitler and Goering, the Gaullist Resistance plan to capture them, leading to a showdown between the two Resistance groups.
7	78	"A Fishful of Francs"	John B. Hobbs	Jeremy Lloyd & Paul Adam	23 February 1992
Von Strohm and Gruber are hiding in the cafe, but the Communist Resistance are not giving up easily. They manage to escape to the chateau, but General Von Klinkerhoffen decides that Hitler and Goering will be seen to leave the town, to act as bait to lead the Germans to the Communist Resistance. As the doubles are not expected to survive an ambush by the Germans once they are captured by the Communist Resistance, two French peasants will play the parts – whoever fits the uniforms best – which just happens to be René and Edith.
8	79	"Swan Song"	John B. Hobbs	Jeremy Lloyd & Paul Adam	1 March 1992
René and Edith are saved from the firing squad and have to walk back to Nouvion. Meanwhile, the cafe staff and the Resistance believe them to have been shot dead, so take over the running of the cafe themselves. Von Strohm and Gruber make plans to flee to Spain. Yvette learns that she is not pregnant after all.: Note: This episode marks the last appearance of Richard Gibson as Herr Otto Flick. In series nine, this character was played by David Janson.
