= Absolute Press =

British publisher

Absolute Press (renamed Bloomsbury Absolute in 2018) is a specialist food and drink publisher, founded by British publisher Jon Croft in 1979.

== Recipe collections from chefs ==
In 1980 Absolute Press launched a series of cookery books featuring recipes gathered from leading UK restaurant chefs. The series is regarded as being instrumental in laying the foundation for the chef publishing model that was to follow.

In 1982 Absolute Press published Bristol chef Keith Floyd’s first cookbook, Floyd’s Food. Further Floyd books followed, co-published with BBC books, including TV tie-ins Floyd on Fish and Floyd on Fire, which became break out bestsellers and helped establish Keith Floyd as a TV celebrity chef worldwide.

Chefs and cookery writers that have been published by Absolute Press include David Chang, Tom Kerridge, Rick Bayless, Angela Hartnett, Mort Rosenblum, Ben Tish, Atul Kochhar, Amanda Hesser, David Everitt-Matthias, Calum Franklin, Mitch Tonks, Phil Howard and Vivek Singh.

== Absolute Classics ==
In 1988 Absolute Classics was launched. A series made up of foreign language plays, many of them neglected and overlooked classics, translated and adapted into English by leading English language playwrights. Playwrights whose translations and adaptations were published in the series included Nick Dear, David Hare, Ranjit Bolt, Timberlake Wertenbaker, Adrian Mitchell, Neil Bartlett, David Rudkin, Jatinder Verma, Charles Wood, Peter Hall, Olwen Wymark. Absolute Classics was sold to Oberon Books in 1996.

== Outlines ==
In 1997 Absolute Press launched Outlines, a short-lived but well received series of monographs on leading gay, bisexual and lesbian creative artists. The stated aim of the series was to explore how artists’ sexuality might inform their creative output. Titles published included Bessie Smith by Jackie Kay, Michael Field by Emma Donoghue, Quentin Crisp by Tim Fountain, David Hockney by Peter Adam, Armistead Maupin by Patrick Gale and Benjamin Britten by Michael Wilcox.

== Bloomsbury Publishing ==
In 2011 Jon Croft sold Absolute Press to the British Harry Potter publisher Bloomsbury Publishing. Croft was retained as a Consultant Publisher to commission food and drink books on behalf of Bloomsbury for the Absolute list.

In 2012 Croft signed two Michelin star chef Tom Kerridge to Absolute, following which a string of bestselling cookery books from Kerridge followed, including Proper Pub Food, Best Ever Dishes, Lose Weight for Good, The Hand & Flowers Cookbook and Outdoor Cooking. Croft and Kerridge developed a professional and personal friendship that has seen the Absolute imprint establish Kerridge as Bloomsbury’s most successful author after JK Rowling.
