= Paul Merton's Palladium Story =

- Written by: John Fisher; Paul Merton
- Directed by: Paul Kirrage
- Presented by: Paul Merton
- Country of origin: United Kingdom
- Original language: English
- No. of series: 1
- No. of episodes: 2

Original release
- Network: BBC1
- Release: 18 September – 25 September 1994

Paul Merton's Palladium Story is a two-part British television series first broadcast on BBC1 on 18 and 25 September 1994. It is presented by Paul Merton who celebrates the history of the London Palladium, in each episode celebrity guests contribute to talking about the history of the venue. On 10 March 2011, just under 17 years after their original broadcast, both episodes were repeated on BBC Four back-to-back.

== Episode list ==
No.	Title	Directed by	Written by	Original release date
1	"Act One: The Variety Years"	Paul Kirrage	John Fisher; Paul Merton	18 September 1994
2	"Act Two: The Television Years"	Paul Kirrage	John Fisher; Paul Merton	25 September 1994

== See also ==
- Sunday Night at the London Palladium
