= The Wimbledon Trilogy =

Novel trilogy by Nigel Williams

The Wimbledon Trilogy consists of three books written by Nigel Williams set in Wimbledon, London and published by Faber & Faber:

Front cover of The Wimbledon Poisoner illustrated by Pierre Le-Tan

- The Wimbledon Poisoner (1990, ISBN 978-0-571-16131-7) : Henry Farr, a struggling solicitor is desperate to get rid of his wife, Elinor and decides to poison her, following the example of Everett Maltby, the original Wimbledon Poisoner. He obtains a quantity of thallium from a chemist using a forged optician's order and bastes a roast chicken with it. Unfortunately his wife is not feeling hungry and neighbour Donald arrives unexpectedly as the meal is served and takes a large portion with tragic results. Soon his friends and neighbours are dying in great numbers as the poisoning continues to misfire, and at every turn Henry is dogged by Inspector Rush, a friend of Elinor's...
- They Came from SW19 (1992, ISBN 978-0-571-16836-1) : 14 year-old ufologist Simon Britten's father has just died and his spiritualist mother attempts to contact him through the advocacy of The First Church of Christ the Spiritualist, South Wimbledon of which she is a member. At the same time the regular UFO watch on Wimbledon Common also makes contact of a different kind. Simon is caught between the church and aliens and struggles to find the truth...
- East of Wimbledon (1993, ISBN 978-0-571-17151-4): Robert Williams passes himself off as a Muslim to get a job at the Wimbledon Independent Islamic Boys Day School. This pretence is soon under pressure as Robert knows very little about Islam. He is also entrusted with the care of Hasan a blind pupil who is believed by the so-called 'twenty-fourthers' (cf. twelvers), a sect of the nizari ismailis, to be the twenty-fourth imam (cf. Twelfth Imam), whose occultation they eagerly await...

The three books were combined into a single volume entitled The Wimbledon Trilogy in 1995 (ISBN 978-0571176335).

Scenes from a Poisoner's Life (1994, ISBN 978-0-571-17403-4), is a series of 12 linked stories, one for each month of the year concerning characters from the Wimbledon Trilogy.

== Screen adaptation ==
The Wimbledon Poisoner was adapted for television in 1994 by the BBC. Originally in two parts and directed by Robert Young it starred Robert Lindsay as Henry Farr, Alison Steadman as Elinor and Philip Jackson as Inspector Rush.
