= Carole Ashby =

British actress (born 1955)

Carole Ashby (born 24 March 1955 in Cannock, Staffordshire) is an English actress and pinup girl. She appeared as a glamour girl in the British news media during the 1970s.

== Early life ==
She attended the School of St Mary and St Anne, which became Abbots Bromley School.

== Career ==
In 1972, Ashby was named "Britain's most glamorous schoolgirl." Ashby is best known for playing the small recurring part of Louise, a member of the communist resistance, in 'Allo 'Allo!.

She appeared alongside Roger Moore in two James Bond films, Octopussy and A View to a Kill. Her appearances were brief but they assured her Bond Girl status.

She appeared in the 1981 hit movie Chariots of Fire. She was a hostess on the final (1983) season of Anglia Television's Sale of the Century.

== Personal life ==
In the 1990s Ashby was engaged to Jeremy Lloyd, co-creator of 'Allo 'Allo.

== Filmography ==
=== Film ===
Year	Title	Role	Type
1974	Moving On		Feature film
1981	Chariots of Fire		Feature film
1983	Octopussy	Octopussy Girl	Feature film
1983	Sale of the Century	Hostess	TV series
1985	Arthur the King	Princess	
1985	Bergerac	Moira Montalban	TV series, Season 4, episode 2
1985	A View to a Kill	Whistling Girl	Feature film
1988–1992	'Allo 'Allo!	Louise	TV series
1989	Minder	Imogen	TV series, Season 7, episode 5: Fiddler on the Hoof
1995	Savage Hearts	Receptionist #2	
1998	Cash in Hand	Veronica Tate	Final appearance
