= The Best of 'Allo 'Allo! =

The Best of 'Allo 'Allo! was broadcast on 17 August 1994, two years after the ending of the BBC sitcom 'Allo 'Allo!, to celebrate the 10th anniversary of the broadcast of the first series. By the time of this broadcast, the actual pilot for the series had aired nearly 12 years earlier.

The 50-minute episode is a mixture of new footage and archive footage from past episodes.

== Plot ==
The episode is set some time after the end of the war. No date is given, but clearly it's before the last regular episode (where René elopes with Yvette).

René and Edith are in the Alps celebrating Edith's 35th birthday – Edith has knocked the war years off her true age, including World War I and the Crimean War! This event brings them to remember the incidents which took place during World War II; in particular the events which took place in their hometown of Nouvion.

What follows is a collection of highlights from the show's eighty-five episodes, interwoven with Edith and René's reminiscences. A complete list of the archive footage:

- LeClerc the forger turns up at the café, and Lt. Gruber meets René for the first time (Pilot).
- Hans and the Colonel are forced to hide the priceless cuckoo clock and the Fallen Madonna, when Herr Flick turns up looking for them (Pilot).
- A collection of Michelle's catchphrase – "Listen Carefully, I shall say this only once..."
- Michelle announcing that the British airmen, whilst wearing German uniforms, have been captured by the Communist Resistance (1.02).
- Maria dressed as a boy, delivering a pigeon to René (1.02)
- Herr Flick and Helga strip to change into their onion-seller disguises.(1.02)
- René appears before General Von Klinkerhoffen, who orders him to be shot (1.04).
- Gruber places flowers on René's grave; just as René rises from the ground on the Resistance's hidden radio mast (6.01).
- René, Mimi, and the Flying Nun incident (4.04).
- Crabtree tells René of his latest "nose" (2.04).
- René, the Colonel, Gruber, Herr Flick and the exploding nose incident (5.10).
- René dressed as a Resistance girl, and giving Gruber the wrong idea (2.06).
- René, LeClerc and the dreaded circular-saw incident (5.04).
- A collection of René's various affairs with Maria and Yvette.
- Interviewing possible candidates for the waitress job (4.03).
- René's affair with Mimi (series 4).
- A collection of Madame Fanny's bedroom incidents.
- A collection of LeClerc's catchphrase – "It is I, LeClerc!"
- The marriage ceremony of Ernest LeClerc and Madame Fanny (6.07).
- Monsieur Alfonse expresses his love for Madame Edith (2.04).
- Herr Flick and Helga repair a puncture (3.04).

At the end of the episode, René and Edith re-affirm their love for each other; the archive clip of them singing When You Were Sweet Sixteen together (5.18) is shown; and the final scene is of them clinking champagne glasses together.

The familiar "You have been watching" credits roll at the end of the episode, crediting every actor who played in the show, as well as the directors and producers.
