= List of Red Dwarf episodes =

Red Dwarf is a British science fiction sitcom that aired on BBC Two between 1988 and 1999, and on Dave between 2009 and 2020, gaining a cult following. The series was created by Rob Grant and Doug Naylor.

The first six series were written by Grant and Naylor, while Series VII and VIII were written by Naylor with collaborations from other writers, and Series IX to XII and the 2020 special The Promised Land were written by Naylor alone. Series I and II were produced by Paul Jackson Productions (with Grant Naylor Productions taking over from Series III) for BBC North, and broadcast on BBC2. Red Dwarf first aired on 15 February 1988 and ended its original run on BBC2, by then rebranded BBC Two, on 5 April 1999 after eight series, with some PBS stations in the United States airing the entire eighth series earlier on 7 March. From 2009 to 2020, Grant Naylor Productions produced new episodes for UKTV, which were broadcast on the TV channel Dave.

The series follows the fortunes of Dave Lister who is stranded three million years in the future, together with the hologrammatic representation of his former bunkmate and immediate superior Arnold Rimmer; a creature known only as Cat; and the ship's computer Holly. During Series II, the crew encounter a mechanoid called Kryten, who joins them from Series III onwards. In Series VI the Red Dwarf ship has been stolen from the crew, forcing them to travel in the smaller Starbug craft for two series. In Series VII Kristine Kochanski, Lister's former love interest, joins the crew, following the departure of Rimmer. In series VIII the entire crew of the Red Dwarf ship—including a pre-accident Rimmer—are resurrected, but the Starbug crew, along with Rimmer, find themselves sentenced to two years in the ship's brig for "abusing classified information".

The show was revived on Dave in 2009, with three-part special, Back to Earth. In this, and the subequent Series X to XII, Lister, Rimmer (as a hologram), Cat and Kryten continue their adventures back on Red Dwarf alone, Kochanski having departed due to Lister's descent into depression and Holly offline due to water damage. A back-up of Holly is installed in The Promised Land.

During the course of the programme, 74 episodes of Red Dwarf aired, including one special over twelve series, between 15 February 1988 and 9 April 2020.

== Series overview ==
Series	Episodes	Originally released		
Series	Episodes	First released	Last released	Network
I	6	15 February 1988	21 March 1988	BBC2
II	6	6 September 1988	11 October 1988	BBC2
III	6	14 November 1989	19 December 1989	BBC2
IV	6	14 February 1991	21 March 1991	BBC2
V	6	20 February 1992	26 March 1992	BBC2
VI	6	7 October 1993	11 November 1993	BBC2
VII	8	17 January 1997	7 March 1997	BBC2
VIII	8	18 February 1999	5 April 1999	BBC Two
Back to Earth	3	10 April 2009	12 April 2009	Dave
X	6	4 October 2012	8 November 2012	Dave
XI	6	22 September 2016	27 October 2016	Dave
XII	6	12 October 2017	16 November 2017	Dave
The Promised Land		9 April 2020		Dave

== Episodes ==
=== Red Dwarf I (1988) ===
The pilot script was written in 1983; the writing duo team of Grant and Naylor handed the finished script to Paul Jackson who had trouble convincing the BBC to take on the series. Three years after the initial rejections, the script was accepted by BBC North West. The series almost did not happen due to an electricians' strike at the BBC in 1987 which prevented filming and thus the project was shelved. Filming eventually went ahead after the industrial action was resolved.

No. overall	No. in series	Title	Directed by	Written by	Original release date	Prod. code	Viewers (millions)
1	1	"The End"	Ed Bye	Rob Grant and Doug Naylor	15 February 1988	1	4.75
2	2	"Future Echoes"	Ed Bye	Rob Grant and Doug Naylor	22 February 1988	4	3.4
3	3	"Balance of Power"	Ed Bye	Rob Grant and Doug Naylor	29 February 1988	2	4.25
4	4	"Waiting for God"	Ed Bye	Rob Grant and Doug Naylor	7 March 1988	3	3.75
5	5	"Confidence and Paranoia"	Ed Bye	Rob Grant and Doug Naylor	14 March 1988	5	3.8
6	6	"Me^{2}"	Ed Bye	Rob Grant and Doug Naylor	21 March 1988	6	3.8

=== Red Dwarf II (1988) ===
The second series saw location shooting for the first time. Kryten would appear as a one-off in the first episode, played by David Ross.

No. overall	No. in series	Title	Directed by	Written by	Original release date	Prod. code	Viewers (millions)
7	1	"Kryten"	Ed Bye	Rob Grant and Doug Naylor	6 September 1988	4	2.5
8	2	"Better Than Life"	Ed Bye	Rob Grant and Doug Naylor	13 September 1988	1	2.45
9	3	"Thanks for the Memory"	Ed Bye	Rob Grant and Doug Naylor	20 September 1988	2	3.1
10	4	"Stasis Leak"	Ed Bye	Rob Grant and Doug Naylor	27 September 1988	3	3.15
11	5	"Queeg"	Ed Bye	Rob Grant and Doug Naylor	4 October 1988	6	2.3
12	6	"Parallel Universe"	Ed Bye	Rob Grant and Doug Naylor	11 October 1988	5	2.9

=== Red Dwarf III (1989) ===
Red Dwarf III saw a radical change in look for the show, the replacement of Norman Lovett with Hattie Hayridge as Holly, and the return of Kryten as a regular, now played by Robert Llewellyn.

No. overall	No. in series	Title	Directed by	Written by	Original release date	Prod. code	Viewers (millions)
13	1	"Backwards"	Ed Bye	Rob Grant and Doug Naylor	14 November 1989	3	4.3
14	2	"Marooned"	Ed Bye	Rob Grant and Doug Naylor	21 November 1989	1	3.9
15	3	"Polymorph"	Ed Bye	Rob Grant and Doug Naylor	28 November 1989	5	4.4
16	4	"Bodyswap"	Ed Bye	Rob Grant and Doug Naylor	5 December 1989	4	4.1
17	5	"Timeslides"	Ed Bye	Rob Grant and Doug Naylor	12 December 1989	2	4.4
18	6	"The Last Day"	Ed Bye	Rob Grant and Doug Naylor	19 December 1989	6	4.1

=== Red Dwarf IV (1991) ===
No. overall	No. in series	Title	Directed by	Written by	Original release date	Prod. code	Viewers (millions)
19	1	"Camille"	Ed Bye	Rob Grant and Doug Naylor	14 February 1991	4	4.32
20	2	"DNA"	Ed Bye	Rob Grant and Doug Naylor	21 February 1991	6	3.78
21	3	"Justice"	Ed Bye	Rob Grant and Doug Naylor	28 February 1991	1	3.97
22	4	"White Hole"	Ed Bye and (uncredited) Paul Jackson	Rob Grant and Doug Naylor	7 March 1991	5	4.41
23	5	"Dimension Jump"	Ed Bye	Rob Grant and Doug Naylor	14 March 1991	2	4.10
24	6	"Meltdown"	Ed Bye	Rob Grant and Doug Naylor	21 March 1991	3	3.56

=== Red Dwarf V (1992) ===
The series returned without regular director Ed Bye, who was replaced by Juliet May. May found it hard to work with the science fiction elements, which were much more involved and complex than in previous series, and left before the series had completed. The remaining episodes were directed by Grant and Naylor.

No. overall	No. in series	Title	Directed by	Written by	Original release date	Prod. code	Viewers (millions)
25	1	"Holoship"	Juliet May	Rob Grant and Doug Naylor	20 February 1992	3	5.63
26	2	"The Inquisitor"	Juliet May and Grant Naylor	Rob Grant and Doug Naylor	27 February 1992	2	5.44
27	3	"Terrorform"	Juliet May	Rob Grant and Doug Naylor	5 March 1992	4	5.48
28	4	"Quarantine"	Grant Naylor	Rob Grant and Doug Naylor	12 March 1992	5	5.54
29	5	"Demons & Angels"	Juliet May and Grant Naylor	Rob Grant and Doug Naylor	19 March 1992	1	6.04
30	6	"Back to Reality"	Juliet May and Grant Naylor	Rob Grant and Doug Naylor	26 March 1992	6	6.54

=== Red Dwarf VI (1993) ===
Red Dwarf itself was written out, thus removing Hattie Hayridge as Holly—and the series was set entirely aboard Starbug.

No. overall	No. in series	Title	Directed by	Written by	Original release date	Prod. code	Viewers (millions)
31	1	"Psirens"	Andy de Emmony	Rob Grant and Doug Naylor	7 October 1993	1	5.2
32	2	"Legion"	Andy de Emmony	Rob Grant and Doug Naylor	14 October 1993	2	5.6
33	3	"Gunmen of the Apocalypse"	Andy de Emmony	Rob Grant and Doug Naylor	21 October 1993	4	6.0
34	4	"Emohawk: Polymorph II"	Andy de Emmony	Rob Grant and Doug Naylor	28 October 1993	5	6.3
35	5	"Rimmerworld"	Andy de Emmony	Rob Grant and Doug Naylor	4 November 1993	3	6.2
36	6	"Out of Time"	Andy de Emmony	Rob Grant and Doug Naylor	11 November 1993	6	6.3

=== Red Dwarf VII (1997) ===
After Series VI ended, co-creator and writer Rob Grant decided to leave the series to pursue other projects. but Naylor continued with the series, with some other writers. Chris Barrie left as a regular after two episodes and makes a brief appearance in two more. Kochanski (now played by Chloë Annett) was brought back as a regular character.

No. overall	No. in series	Title	Directed by	Written by	Original release date	Viewers (millions)
37	1	"Tikka to Ride"	Ed Bye	Doug Naylor	17 January 1997	6.29
38	2	"Stoke Me a Clipper"	Ed Bye	Paul Alexander and Doug Naylor	24 January 1997	6.16
39	3	"Ouroboros"	Ed Bye	Doug Naylor	31 January 1997	5.86
40	4	"Duct Soup"	Ed Bye	Doug Naylor	7 February 1997	5.44
41	5	"Blue"	Ed Bye	Kim Fuller and Doug Naylor	14 February 1997	5.55
42	6	"Beyond a Joke"	Ed Bye	Robert Llewellyn and Doug Naylor	21 February 1997	5.48
43	7	"Epideme"	Ed Bye	Paul Alexander and Doug Naylor	28 February 1997	4.98
44	8	"Nanarchy"	Ed Bye	Paul Alexander, James Hendrie and Doug Naylor	7 March 1997	5.08

=== Red Dwarf VIII (1999) ===
Having changed the look and format for Series VII, Naylor returned to the series' original roots for Series VIII, resurrecting the original crew of Red Dwarf, along with Holly, this time played by Norman Lovett, and Chris Barrie as Rimmer.

KTEH, a Public Broadcasting Service (PBS) station in San Jose, California, broadcast the entire series on 7 March 1999, before any of the final five episodes had been shown in the UK.

No. overall	No. in series	Title	Directed by	Written by	Original release date	Prod. code	Viewers (millions)
45	1	"Back in the Red: Part I"	Ed Bye	Doug Naylor	18 February 1999	1	6.21
46	2	"Back in the Red: Part II"	Ed Bye	Doug Naylor	25 February 1999	2	5.36
47	3	"Back in the Red: Part III"	Ed Bye	Doug Naylor	4 March 1999	8	5.22
48	4	"Cassandra"	Ed Bye	Doug Naylor	7 March 1999 (US); 11 March 1999 (UK)	3	4.09
49	5	"Krytie TV"	Ed Bye	Doug Naylor and Paul Alexander	7 March 1999 (US); 18 March 1999 (UK)	6	4.81
50	6	"Pete: Part I"	Ed Bye	Doug Naylor	7 March 1999 (US); 25 March 1999 (UK)	4	4.57
51	7	"Pete: Part II"	Ed Bye	Doug Naylor and Paul Alexander	7 March 1999 (US); 1 April 1999 (UK)	7	4.52
52	8	"Only the Good..."	Ed Bye	Doug Naylor	7 March 1999 (US); 5 April 1999 (UK)	5	4.24

=== Red Dwarf: Back to Earth (2009) ===
In 2009, UKTV channel Dave screened three new 25-minute specials to celebrate the 21st anniversary of the show. The new episodes form part of an effort by Dave to screen more original programming, instead of just repeats. The specials were made up of a three-part story, "Back to Earth", as well as a "Making-of" special. Originally, there were to be two episodes, a "Making-of" and a live show titled Red Dwarf: Unplugged. However, according to Robert Llewellyn on Twitter, the Live Show had been cancelled due to time and money, and that there would be three episodes instead. As with series 7, these episodes were not filmed in front of a live studio audience.

No. overall	No. in series	Title	Directed by	Written by	Original release date	Prod. code	Viewers (millions)
53	1	"Back to Earth: Part One"	Doug Naylor	Doug Naylor	10 April 2009	1	2.4
54	2	"Back to Earth: Part Two"	Doug Naylor	Doug Naylor	11 April 2009	2	1.2
55	3	"Back to Earth: Part Three"	Doug Naylor	Doug Naylor	12 April 2009	3	1.2

=== Red Dwarf X (2012) ===
Red Dwarf returned for its first full series since 1999 in October 2012 for six new episodes written by Doug Naylor filmed before a live audience. It was released on DVD and Blu-ray on 19 November 2012. All four original cast members from Back to Earth reprised their roles.

No. overall	No. in series	Title	Directed by	Written by	Original release date	Prod. code	Viewers (millions)
56	1	"Trojan"	Doug Naylor	Doug Naylor	4 October 2012	1	2.0
57	2	"Fathers & Suns"	Doug Naylor	Doug Naylor	11 October 2012	2	1.6
58	3	"Lemons"	Doug Naylor	Doug Naylor	18 October 2012	3	1.5
59	4	"Entangled"	Doug Naylor	Doug Naylor	25 October 2012	4	1.3
60	5	"Dear Dave"	Doug Naylor	Doug Naylor	1 November 2012	5	1.6
61	6	"The Beginning"	Doug Naylor	Doug Naylor	8 November 2012	6	1.4

=== Red Dwarf XI (2016) ===
No. overall	No. in series	Title	Directed by	Written by	Original release date	Prod. code	Viewers (millions)
62	1	"Twentica"	Doug Naylor	Doug Naylor	22 September 2016	6	1.7
63	2	"Samsara"	Doug Naylor	Doug Naylor	29 September 2016	5	1.7
64	3	"Give & Take"	Doug Naylor	Doug Naylor	6 October 2016	1	1.3
65	4	"Officer Rimmer"	Doug Naylor	Doug Naylor	13 October 2016	4	1.3
66	5	"Krysis"	Doug Naylor	Doug Naylor	20 October 2016	3	1.3
67	6	"Can of Worms"	Doug Naylor	Doug Naylor	27 October 2016	2	1.2

=== Red Dwarf XII (2017) ===
No. overall	No. in series	Title	Directed by	Written by	Original release date	Prod. code	Viewers (millions)
68	1	"Cured"	Doug Naylor	Doug Naylor	12 October 2017	3	1.4
69	2	"Siliconia"	Doug Naylor	Doug Naylor	19 October 2017	1	1.3
70	3	"Timewave"	Doug Naylor	Doug Naylor	26 October 2017	2	1.3
71	4	"Mechocracy"	Doug Naylor	Doug Naylor	2 November 2017	4	1.1
72	5	"M-Corp"	Doug Naylor	Doug Naylor	9 November 2017	5	1.0
73	6	"Skipper"	Doug Naylor	Doug Naylor	16 November 2017	6	1.0

=== Red Dwarf: The Promised Land (2020) ===
In 2018, Naylor confirmed discussions were being held about commissioning another series of Red Dwarf, though suggested that a stage show or a film could also be possibilities. UKTV would announce in October 2019 that a feature-length special would see production, to be filmed later in the same year.

No. overall	Title	Directed by	Written by	Original release date	Prod. code	Viewers (millions)
74	"The Promised Land"	Doug Naylor	Doug Naylor	9 April 2020	1	1.0
The posse meet three cat clerics who worship Lister as their God. Lister vows to help them as they're being hunted by Rodon, the ruthless feral cat leader who has vowed to wipe out all cats who worship anyone but him.

== Unproduced scripts ==
=== "Bodysnatcher" ===
Originally to be the second episode of Series I, and would have involved Rimmer going insane trying to deal with his intangibility and attempting to build himself a new body by stealing parts of Lister's, and Lister trying to live with a hologram of himself. The former idea was, in a way, used in the episode "Bodyswap" in Series III, and the latter became the basis for "Me^{2}" (with the plotline transferred from Lister to Rimmer), which filled the sixth spot in the first series after "Bodysnatcher" was dropped.

=== "Dad" ===
"Dad" was planned as the first episode of the show's third series, intended to be a direct continuation of the preceding episode, "Parallel Universe", the final episode of the second series. It was never filmed or even fully scripted; writers Rob Grant and Doug Naylor abandoned it halfway through writing it. Instead, a comically fast Star Wars opening crawl provided exposition for the episode "Backwards", which became the new Series III premiere.

An extract of the unfinished script of "Dad" was included on the DVD release Red Dwarf: The Bodysnatcher Collection alongside several other such extracts. In the same style as the eponymous "lost episode" "Bodysnatcher", the extract of "Dad" was animated in a storyboard style as the script itself was read by lead actor Chris Barrie (who, being a skilled impressionist, supplied the voices of all the characters).

In "Parallel Universe", Lister had slept with a female version of himself while in a parallel dimension and learned that he was pregnant, since in that particular dimension it is the men who bear children. "Dad" was to primarily deal with Lister's pregnancy, why former guest character Kryten had reappeared and become a regular member of the cast and what had happened to him, and why Holly's image had changed from a male to a female. The released script extract shows that "Dad" would not have followed the pre-credits sequence of "Backwards" to the letter. For example, Lister would not have been pregnant with twins: instead he would give birth to a single son. Also, apparently Lister would have rebuilt Kryten while "heavily pregnant", and not "shortly afterwards" as the pre-title "Backwards" scroll suggests. Additionally, unless male Holly actor Norman Lovett was to make a guest appearance in the episode it is likely that Holly would have first appeared as a female at the very beginning of the episode.

The script was ultimately rejected by the show's writers and producers, Rob Grant and Doug Naylor, who felt that the script was not as funny as previous episodes. In The Red Dwarf Programme Guide, Chris Howarth and Steve Lyons write that another reason "Dad" was rejected was because it was possibly sexist.

Jokes from the script were worked into other episodes. For example, Lister's revealing that he was abandoned at birth and Rimmer's subsequent speculation that Lister was the product of brother-sister incest was written into the episode "The Last Day".

=== "Identity Within" ===
This episode was going to be in Series VII but was replaced by "Duct Soup" for budgetary reasons. A reconstructed version of the episode (read by Chris Barrie) appears on the Series VII DVD release. The Cat is fatally ill, with only one cure: he has to have sex. To save his life, Lister, Rimmer and Kryten have to find a female of his species and get her to fall in love with the Cat before he dies a virgin. Cat's virginity is revisited in the Series XI finale "Can of Worms" where he's seduced by a Polymorph disguised as a female Felis sapien intent on impregnating him with its spawn.

=== "Into the Gloop" ===
Rob Grant wrote a short script, "Into the Gloop", for an online Official Red Dwarf Fan Club convention in February 2021. The script is an alternate resolution of Series VI's cliffhanger (the last episode Grant co-wrote), and marked Grant's first creative work for the Red Dwarf series since the novel Backwards in 1996. The script was performed as a one-off live event for the convention, directed by Ed Bye and produced by Paul Jackson, and featuring fans cast as the Dwarfers. The story begins at the aforementioned episode's ending, as Rimmer fires at their time machine, only this time he misses, instead shooting off its "unreality field inhibitor." This causes the universe to become entropic, before everything, including the crew, are reduced to grey gloop.

== Feature film ==
Once Series VIII ended in 1999, Doug Naylor attempted to make a feature-length version of the show. A script was written, by Naylor, and flyers began circulating around certain websites. The flyer outlined the movie's plot, set in the distant future where Homo Sapienoids—a fearsome flesh-machine hybrid race—had taken over the solar system and were wiping out the human race. Spaceships that tried to escape Earth were hunted down until only one remained... Red Dwarf. Pre-production began in 2004 and filming was planned for 2005. However, sufficient funding was not forthcoming and production was put on hold.

== American pilots ==
Two versions of a pilot episode for a proposed NBC version of Red Dwarf were produced in 1992—a complete episode and a partial episode with different cast members. Neither version aired, though excerpts from the first pilot appeared on the Red Dwarf V DVD set.

== Bibliography ==
- "Red Dwarf – Episode Guide". British Comedy Guide. Archived from the original on 22 April 2009.
- "Red Dwarf episode guide". reddwarf.co.uk.
- Howarth, Chris; Lyons, Steve (1993). Red Dwarf Programme Guide. Virgin Books. ISBN 0-86369-682-1.
