= Red Dwarf VII =

Series of television

- Starring: Chris Barrie; Craig Charles; Danny John-Jules; Robert Llewellyn; Chloë Annett
- No. of episodes: 8

Release
- Original network: BBC2
- Original release: 17 January – 7 March 1997

Series chronology
- ← Previous; Red Dwarf VI Next → Red Dwarf VIII

Red Dwarf VII is the seventh series of the British science fiction sitcom Red Dwarf. It consists of eight episodes and was broadcast on UK television channel BBC2 in January to March 1997. The series is the first to be written by Doug Naylor without Rob Grant, who had written and created the show with Naylor; some episodes had additional co-writers.

The series follows the crew of the spaceship Starbug, who are seeking to return to their main ship and home, the Red Dwarf. They are Dave Lister (Craig Charles), who is the only survivor of an accident on the mining ship Red Dwarf, and the last survivor of the human race, three million years in the future; a holographic reproduction of his dead bunkmate and boss, Arnold Rimmer (Chris Barrie); a sapient Cat (Danny John-Jules) who is a result of three million years' evolution, and sanitation droid Kryten (Robert Llewellyn).

Actor Chris Barrie leaves the show as Rimmer in episode two (making two small appearances in later episodes), and Lister's love interest Kristine Kochanski, now played by Chloë Annett joins as a regular part of the crew in episode three.

== Writing ==
After series VI ended, co-creator and writer Rob Grant decided to leave the series to pursue other projects, but Naylor continued with the series to build towards the often discussed movie, and the series was expanded to eight episodes to meet US syndication requirements.

To help with the expanded episode count, Naylor brought in the help of other writers. Paul Alexander and Kim Fuller had both written for Jasper Carrot, on whose show Grant and Naylor had got their start on television; and James Hendrie, who Doug knew from Spitting Image. John McKay's script "Identity Within" was scrapped; this would have focused on the character of the Cat and was replaced at a late stage with the quickly-written "Duct Soup".

Robert Llewellyn, who played Kryten, also contributed an episode, although his attempt to give himself an easy week by writing his character out backfired — the final script featured Kryten and his brother Able, also played by Llewellyn, in large roles.

== Cast and plot ==
Chris Barrie, disappointed with the hectic workload of series VI, and busy with playing the title character in another sitcom, The Brittas Empire, and agreed only to appear in four of the episodes. In episode two, "Stoke Me a Clipper", his character Arnold Rimmer leaves to become Ace Rimmer. He makes appearances in two episodes later in the run, in flashbacks and fantasy sequences.

Kristine Kochanski (now played by Chloë Annett) was brought back as a regular character for this series. She had previously been played by Clare Grogan, who has said that she was not considered "too old".

Changes to the series itself were evident with the mix of science fiction and sitcom episodes throughout. This was an attempt by Naylor to move away from the "monster of the week" format that he felt series VI suffered from.

The series continues the story arc begun in series VI, with the crew in Starbug searching for the Red Dwarf itself. They find Red Dwarf in the finale, "Nanarchy", which has been reconstructed by nanites, along with ship's computer Holly, played by Norman Lovett, who makes a brief return in the final episode. The ending leads directly in to the start of series VIII

== Production ==
Ed Bye returned to direct the series, after leaving due to scheduling clashes for series V. The studio audience was now removed from the series and a single-camera setup was predominantly used, which allowed more sophisticated lighting. Episodes were still videotaped, but were digitally processed to look like film, and although there was no live audience, a laughter track was later recorded at a screening of the episodes before an audience.

Studio shooting took place at Shepperton. Various episodes had location shooting: the episode "Tikka to Ride", which is set in Dallas, had scenes fillmed at Farnborough Airfield and a test track at Chobham. "Beyond a Joke" features scenes set in a artificial reality simulation in "Jane Austen World" — an explosion effect went off with much more strength than intended, causing damage to nearby houses.

== Reception ==
Writing in 2015, Den of Geek ranked Red Dwarf VII the second lowest full series of the show, above only Red Dwarf VIII, saying that "The departure of Chris Barrie left a gaping void, because with him went not only Rimmer but also the odd couple setup around which the show was built", although stating that "All things considered, it's nowhere near as bad as it could have been", and highlighting "Stoke Me a Clipper" and "Blue", both of which Barrie does appear in, as "strong".

== Episodes ==
No. overall	No. in series	Title	Directed by	Written by	Original release date	Viewers (millions)
37	1	"Tikka to Ride"	Ed Bye	Doug Naylor	17 January 1997	6.29
The crew find themselves resurrected due to the time paradox resulting from the battle with their future selves. The time paradox also results in a greatly upgraded and much larger Starbug. However, the curry supplies have gone missing, and so Lister devises a sneaky plan which involves swapping Kryten's head, once again utilising the time machine, and which ultimately results in the crew getting mixed up in the assassination of President Kennedy in Dallas, in 1963.
38	2	"Stoke Me a Clipper"	Ed Bye	Paul Alexander and Doug Naylor	24 January 1997	6.16
Daredevil pilot Ace Rimmer, fatally wounded after rescuing Princess Bonjella, travels from his own dimension into the dimension where Starbug is cruising. His intention is to try to bring out courage in the cowardly version of himself aboard Starbug, and then recruit Arnold Rimmer as his replacement, so that after his death another Rimmer will carry on the legacy of the interstellar space hero.
39	3	"Ouroboros"	Ed Bye	Doug Naylor	31 January 1997	5.86
Lister, Cat and Kryten stumble upon a tear in the fabric of space that leads to another dimension. There they meet a parallel version of Lister's old girlfriend, Kristine Kochanski, who becomes stranded on Starbug. Meanwhile, Lister discovers the truth about himself and who his parents were.
40	4	"Duct Soup"	Ed Bye	Doug Naylor	7 February 1997	5.44
Kryten gets fussy and jealous thinking that Lister likes Kochanski better than him. When the primary power goes off and they get stuck in a room, they have no choice but to climb into the small ventilation ducts which wind round Starbug in order to escape. Whilst inside the ducts they discover a lot about each other, including the fact Lister is claustrophobic.
41	5	"Blue"	Ed Bye	Kim Fuller and Doug Naylor	14 February 1997	5.55
Starbug is travelling through a rather uninteresting region of space and the crew are bored and begin to nitpick at petty areas of their lives. Meanwhile, Lister finds, much to his own surprise and disgust, that he is missing Rimmer, and even having romantic dreams about him returning. Kryten's solution is to take him on a ride called "The Rimmer Experience," which recounts outrageously fictionalised events from Rimmer's diaries.
42	6	"Beyond a Joke"	Ed Bye	Robert Llewellyn and Doug Naylor	21 February 1997	5.48
Searching for a new head for Kryten, which exploded due to build-up of negative thought after an incident involving ketchup added to lobster, the crew encounter a rogue simulant on a deserted ship. The simulant kidnaps Kryten and commissions one of his own droids, Able, to fix him up, but Kryten and Able discover they are brothers, the same model, and Able helps Kryten escape. Kryten then discovers from Able a disturbing secret about their creator.
43	7	"Epideme"	Ed Bye	Paul Alexander and Doug Naylor	28 February 1997	4.98
The crew come across a frozen supply ship, the Leviathan, with one survivor: Caroline Carmen, one of Lister's former crushes. She revives in the middle of the night, as a zombie; she has been dead for a long time, and infects Lister with the dreaded Epideme virus. Lister tries talking with the virus directly through a communication link (Epideme is a sentient, self-aware organism) but Epideme refuses to let Lister live. Drastic action must be taken if Lister is to survive.
44	8	"Nanarchy"	Ed Bye	Paul Alexander, James Hendrie & Doug Naylor	7 March 1997	5.08
Lister tries to cope with the loss of his arm. Meanwhile, Kryten searches for his nanobots—incredibly advanced microscopic robots, which can alter forms of matter at the sub-atomic level—so that he can rebuild Lister's arm. Kryten finds the nanobots in Lister's laundry basket, and also discovers that it was the nanobots who stole the mothership Red Dwarf in the first instance. Kryten gets the nanobots to rebuild both Red Dwarf and Lister's arm. Red Dwarf makes an appearance, but with one problem—its size.

== Home video ==
Red Dwarf VII was released on VHS in November 1997, with extended cuts of episodes, and in regular form in October 1999. It was released on DVD in November 2005.
