= Nanarchy =

- Red Dwarf episode
- Episode no.: Series 7 Episode 8
- Directed by: Ed Bye
- Written by: Paul Alexander; James Hendrie; Doug Naylor
- Original air date: 7 March 1997

Episode chronology
← Previous "Epideme"	Next → "Back in the Red"
- Red Dwarf VII

"Nanarchy" is the eighth, and final, episode of science fiction sitcom Red Dwarf Series VII and the 44th in the series run. It was first broadcast on the British television channel BBC2 on 7 March 1997. The episode was written by Paul Alexander, James Hendrie and Doug Naylor, and directed by Ed Bye. After two series of tracking their ship, the crew of Starbug finally discover the location of their missing mining ship Red Dwarf and its computer Holly.

== Plot ==
Lister (Craig Charles) is finding it very difficult to get used to life with only one arm, but seems to enjoy Kryten (Robert Llewellyn) nursing him, and Kryten is absolutely loving it. Kochanski (Chloë Annett) is fed up with seeing Kryten doing things for him that he could easily do with one arm. Tests with a prototype prosthetic arm are unsuccessful, with its two settings resulting either in Lister having to exert great effort to move it or in Lister repeatedly punching Kryten in the head due to subconscious anger. Kryten comes up with a solution – nanobots from Kryten's self-repair system could conceivably rebuild an arm for Lister. The problem is, Kryten hasn't seen his nanobots since the attack on the crew by the Despair Squid hundreds of years earlier, right before they lost Red Dwarf. They therefore decide to retrace their steps all the way back to the ocean planet where they met the Despair Squid and have to go into Deep Sleep for the very long journey.

When they emerge from Deep Sleep near their destination they are surprised to discover a planetoid which the Navicomp identifies as Red Dwarf. Down on the desert surface they find items from Red Dwarf including the original Holly (Norman Lovett) who explains that the nanobots restored his core program and then mutinied: they deconstructed Red Dwarf, creating their own miniature version of the ship and turned the rest into a planetoid for safekeeping, converting the ship's many computerized systems into sand. The crew now realize that it was the nano version of Red Dwarf that they were chasing all along – the nanobots ended up evading them by coming aboard Starbug and travelling around their own galaxy inside Lister's clothes hamper and that all along Red Dwarf had been with them.

Kryten captures the nanobots in a glass jar and tortures them by tapping the side with a pencil. He tells them to make a new arm for Lister and to turn the planetoid back into Red Dwarf. The nanobots follow Kryten's orders. As a result, Lister is given the body of a muscular bodybuilder, which the others assume to be from the nanobots feeling guilty for all the trouble they have caused. But then Starbug flies into the reconstructed Red Dwarf, which is also shown to be awfully bigger than normal. In the last shot Starbug flies in like a buzzing fly against a massively enlarged ship in the hangar.

== Production ==
This is the first time since 1988's "Parallel Universe" that Norman Lovett has appeared as Holly, the ship's computer. In between, the character – played by Hattie Hayridge – was last seen in Series V's "Back to Reality".

== Reception ==
Most reviewers noted the return of Norman Lovett as Holly, although DVDActive disliked the episode's "mercilessly slow first scene". Sci-Fi Online thought that Chloë Annett "had evidently settled into role ... and delivers some funny lines."
