= Blue (Red Dwarf) =

- Red Dwarf episode
- Episode no.: Series 7 Episode 5
- Directed by: Ed Bye
- Written by: Kim Fuller; Doug Naylor
- Original air date: 14 February 1997

Episode chronology
← Previous "Duct Soup"	Next → "Beyond a Joke"
- Red Dwarf VII

"Blue" is the fifth episode of science fiction sitcom Red Dwarf Series VII and the 41st in the series run. It was first broadcast on the British television channel BBC2 on 14 February 1997, and was written by Kim Fuller and Doug Naylor, and directed by Ed Bye. Until Red Dwarf: Back to Earth, it was the last episode to feature the hologram Rimmer.

== Plot ==
Kristine Kochanski (Chloë Annett) is trying to get back to her own dimension, as she is having a hard time adjusting to life on a "Boys ship", and finds a possible link-way back but only has hours to get there. Meanwhile, Kryten (Robert Llewellyn) is still jealous of the relationship that she could potentially have with Lister (Craig Charles), but he is angrier at the effect that her presence is having on his running of the ship: from the massive workload of extra laundry, which he cannot fathom, to a continuing issue with salad cream. Whilst venting at him over the issue, Lister questions his unfamiliarity with women's laundry given his experience with the female crew on the Nova 5, but Kryten explains that when he was emptying his cache files to create memory, he discarded his lingerie database, as the only reason he could think for keeping it at the time was in case Lister "wanted to attend a fancy dress party as Hermann Göring".

In an effort to get her to the link faster, Lister recklessly navigates a course through the tail of a Comet. But when thruster systems begin to fail, Starbug is damaged, meaning the linkway is out of reach. Cat (Danny John-Jules) identifies the reason the thrusters did not work is because Starbug is too heavy, so he and Lister decide to clear out a lot of junk that was left behind by Rimmer (Chris Barrie). But progress is halted when Lister refuses to throw any of it out, saying that he is beginning to miss Rimmer and reflects on some of the fun times that he and Rimmer spent together since Lister was released from stasis, namely pranks made at Rimmer's expense. When he has a dream that Rimmer returns and he and Rimmer kiss, Kryten tries some psychology to get to the bottom of Lister's problem. However, Kochanski has a little talk with Lister and (relatively effortlessly) makes him realise why he misses Rimmer, much to Kryten's disgust.

A few days later during Games Night, Kochanski is made to feel more unwelcome when her idea of games are far less crude than the ones the boys play, which include "Match the Body Part to the Crew Member". Kryten, having to be one step better than Kochanski, reveals that he has created "The Rimmer Experience", a virtual reality rollercoaster ride of ship life, which he based on information taken from Rimmer's diaries and logs. The ride depicts Rimmer thinking of himself as a "hero" and "remarkable", giving Cat fashion tips (which Cat declares would make him look like a "woodwork teacher"), and believing that Lister has called for Rimmer to save him before Lister wets himself. The ride culminates with a song and dance by animated Rimmer puppets. As the ride ends, Lister declares that he never wants to hear from "that scum-sucking, lying, weasel-minded smeghead" ever again. A self-satisfied Kryten then declares, "Sigmund Freud, eat your heart out!"

== Production ==
Red Dwarf VII was the first series after the departure of co-creator Rob Grant. Kim Fuller had previously worked with Doug Naylor on Carrott's Lib. His script for "Blue" was also edited by Naylor to fit into the Red Dwarf universe. As part of Naylor's plan to mix up the episodes between science fiction and comedy, "Blue" was tailored towards the latter.

"Blue" marks Rimmer's last appearance as a hologram within a Red Dwarf series until the Red Dwarf: Back to Earth specials in Easter 2009. His next appearance would be as a human in Season VIII's "Back in the Red: Part I".

The singing Rimmer Munchkins was sung by Howard Goodall. Chris Barrie was not offered the chance to sing this, which he would have liked to as stated in the Series VII commentary DVD.

== Reception ==
"Blue" has been seen as an episode of rather mixed quality. DVDActive complained about the "weak" flashback sequences, the "overlong" dream-sequence, and "Kryten and Kochanski continuously squabbling"; however, the reviewer enjoyed the "dazzling musical finale." Sci-Fi Online thought the episode had a couple of "classic, attention-grabbing moments" including "that kiss and the unforgettable Munchkin Song at the end." BellaOnline liked the episode, calling the final musical sequence a "classic moment" with a "song [that] is as catchy and sticky as 'It's A Small World After All' at Disney's Magic Kingdom."

Sophie Davies, writing in 2018 for CultBox, said that "the high points of the episode are Lister's dream, in which he and Rimmer share a passionate kiss, and the Rimmer Experience in the AR suite", concluding "the climax of 'Blue' delivers some of series VII’s biggest laughs."
