= Stoke Me a Clipper =

- Red Dwarf episode
- Episode no.: Series 7 Episode 2
- Directed by: Ed Bye
- Written by: Paul Alexander; Doug Naylor
- Original air date: 24 January 1997

Guest appearances
- Brian Cox as The King; Sarah Alexander as Queen; John Thompson as Good Knight; Ken Morley as Captain Voorhese; Alison Senior as Princess Bonjella

Episode chronology
← Previous "Tikka to Ride"	Next → "Ouroboros"
- Red Dwarf VII

"Stoke Me a Clipper" is the second episode of science fiction sit-com Red Dwarf Series VII and the 38th in the series run. It was first broadcast on the British television channel BBC2 on 24 January 1997 and was written by Paul Alexander and Doug Naylor, and directed by Ed Bye. It was the first episode to involve a writer other than co-creator/writers Grant or Naylor.

== Plot ==
Ace Rimmer, Rimmer's (Chris Barrie) better-looking heroic alternate self, from "Dimension Jump" and "Emohawk: Polymorph II" makes a rescue attempt on a captured princess. Although he succeeds in rescuing her, Ace takes a fatal bullet hit. Meanwhile on Starbug, Lister (Craig Charles) is tired of taking cold showers, nearly using all the water supplies in the process, so he goes into the artificial reality machine with his book of cheats. He challenges the king's best knight so he can win the honour of spending a night and a day with the queen of Camelot. Using his cheat codes he defeats the knight, claims his prize and with one last cheat the queen's chastity belt falls freely to the ground. Lister and the queen then proceed to have sex, with an interruption by Lister asking for whipped cream from the astounded crowd and king (Brian Cox).

Ace transports into Starbug's dimension and gets a welcome reception from all but Rimmer. Once they are alone, Ace reveals to Rimmer that he is dying and wants Rimmer to replace him as Ace. He also tells Rimmer and Lister of the Ace secret—The original Ace Rimmer is long dead: the man before them is the latest in a long line of alternate versions of Rimmer from countless dimensions who have all taken the reins to be Ace. And now that he is doomed to die, Ace must train Rimmer to succeed him and keep the legend going. After encouragement from Lister, Rimmer decides to accept the offer and begins his training, but soon gives in so Ace forcibly redresses him as Ace to help him get into character. Rimmer then encounters the King's Best Knight in the corridors of Starbug (who supposedly escaped from AR), and who is searching for 'Lister of Smeg'. After a brief sword fight, Rimmer shoots the Knight, revealed afterwards to be a disguised Lister, who switched the ammo for blanks. Rimmer makes it back to Ace in time to watch him die. Lister then tells Cat (Danny John-Jules) and Kryten (Robert Llewellyn) that Rimmer is Ace, and the dead light bee belongs to their shipmate killed by the Knight.

With the help of Lister, Rimmer passes himself off as Ace (nearly), and they hold a funeral for their shipmate. When Rimmer reveals he is still nervous, Lister follows up on a promise he made Ace and they follow the coffin to a planet with a ring made of billions of coffins, showing the number of Rimmers who succeeded in becoming Ace and passing the flame, causing Lister to ask if he'll be the one to 'break the chain'. After a few weeks, Rimmer fully accepts his role as Ace and says his goodbye to the crew before leaving Starbug.

== Production ==
Going solo for Series VII had worried Doug Naylor. To help him with the writing duties he hired a small group of writers. Paul Alexander, a Jasper Carrott writing regular, was the first one to help out. This was a new situation to Naylor having previously had control over every script. He would however re-write and edit each script to make them fit into the Red Dwarf's creative pedigree.

This episode featured a large number of famous guest actors. Scottish-born Hollywood movie veteran Brian Cox played the medieval English king while British comedy actress Sarah Alexander portrayed his French queen. English actor Ken Morley portrayed the German commander Captain Voorhese. British television actress Alison Senior portrayed Princess Bonjella. Andy Gell also appeared as a soldier. The medieval scenes were staged with the aid of the Medieval Combat Society and the Plantenant Medieval Archery and Combat Society.

Chris Barrie had decided to leave the series at this point, and had committed to four more episodes, but was written out in the second episode anyway, allowing more time to develop Kochanski's character, who would be arriving in the next episode. This episode marks the original Rimmer hologram's final 'real' appearance in series VII, with his other appearances taking the forms of flashbacks and dream sequences. In Series VIII Chris Barrie would portray a resurrected human form of Rimmer. He would reappear as the original hologram Rimmer again in Red Dwarf: Back to Earth.

The German base scene was filmed at RAF Northolt, and the medieval scenes were filmed at Newark Priory.

== Cultural and historical references ==
The name "Stoke Me A Clipper" came from Ace Rimmer's catch phrase, "Smoke me a kipper, I'll be back for breakfast", but because of Rimmer's incompetence he says it wrong and it comes out as the title.

There is also a very clear reference to the James Bond film Goldfinger in a conversation similar to the one when James Bond is on Goldfinger's trap. In the scene, Bond asks Goldfinger "You expect me to talk?" to which he replies "No Mr. Bond, I expect you to die". In the episode, Ace asks the German captain "You expect me to concede?" to which the captain replies "No Mr. Rimmer, I expect you to die!".

== Reception ==
"Stoke Me A Clipper" was liked by some critics. DVDActive called it "one of the funnier episodes of the series [with] some good laughs". DVD Verdict stated that "some of the scenes are very moving, especially when you consider that Barrie was, supposedly, never coming back." Sci-Fi Online on the other hand, felt that the episode starts well but then seemed to forget to be a comedy, instead "embarking upon a Jedi-style training mission."
