= Artistic Differences =

- Genre: Sitcom; Family Entertainment
- Written by: Paul Alexander, Simon Braithwaite
- Directed by: Jeff Jones
- Starring: S Club 7
- Country of origin: United Kingdom
- Original language: English
- No. of episodes: 1

Production
- Executive producer: Simon Fuller
- Production locations: L.A., California, United States
- Running time: 45 minutes (approx.)
- Production companies: 19 Entertainment; Popworld

Original release
- Network: ITV (CITV)
- Release: 9 September 2000

Related
- L.A. 7 Christmas Special

Artistic Differences is the third one-off programme from the British pop group S Club 7. It first aired in 2000 and was produced for ITV. In this TV special, the group look in danger when Bradley falls out with Paul over artistic differences and decides to join another band, while Rachel wants to leave the band and get married.

== Plot ==
The special opens with the group stranded in Los Angeles, facing financial strain and requiring two thousand dollars to repair their vehicle. Hannah experiences a vivid nightmare predicting that the band will break up in Los Angeles, age into their 30s, and never see one another again. While the group initially dismisses her premonition, internal group tensions begin to surface.

Bradley and Paul engage in a heated argument regarding the creative direction and "constitution" of the band. Refusing to back down, Bradley quits S Club 7 to join a rival boyband named Guys Incorporated. In response, Paul enforces a strict rule barring Bradley from performing with S Club until he officially announces his new venture, worsening the rift. Concurrently, Rachel reveals she is considering leaving the music industry entirely to settle down and get married, leaving the remaining members to question whether the group can survive as a five-piece. Additional complications arise when Paul is distracted by a visit from his childhood sweetheart, Zoe (Holly Willoughby), who is subsequently scouted by a talent agent and becomes the face of a major Hollywood cosmetics campaign.

After experiencing life outside the group, both Bradley and Rachel reconsider their decisions. Bradley grows disillusioned with the superficial nature of his new band, while Paul's stubbornness softens. The members reconcile their creative and personal differences, prioritizing their personal bonds over external industry pressures and preserving the unity of the group.

== Production ==
=== Filming and writing ===
Artistic Differences was commissioned as a one-off television special following the continuity of the group's second television series, L.A. 7. The special was directed by Jeff Jones and co-written by Paul Alexander and Simon Braithwaite. It was executive produced by the band's manager, Simon Fuller, under the 19 Entertainment and Popworld production banners. Structurally, the programme maintained the hybrid pop/sitcom format popularized by the group's prior series, combining scripted comedic and dramatic narratives with showcase musical numbers by the band.

Although produced for a British audience to air on CITV, the television film was shot entirely on location in Los Angeles, California. The narrative utilized the established Los Angeles backdrops from L.A. 7, including exterior street and restaurant sequences to depict the characters' experiences in Hollywood.

Linda Blair reprised her role as the group's landlord, Joni, from L.A. 7. Artistic Differences is notably recognized for featuring the television acting debut of presenter Holly Willoughby, who was cast as Zoe, Paul's former partner.

== Cast ==
=== S Club 7 ===
- Tina Barrett
- Paul Cattermole
- Jon Lee
- Bradley McIntosh
- Jo O'Meara
- Hannah Spearritt
- Rachel Stevens

=== Guest stars ===
- Linda Blair – Joni
- Riley Schmidt – Zach
- Holly Willoughby – Zoe
