= Epideme =

- Red Dwarf episode
- Episode no.: Series 7 Episode 7
- Directed by: Ed Bye
- Written by: Paul Alexander; Doug Naylor
- Original air date: 28 February 1997

Guest appearances
- Gary Martin as Epideme; Nicky Leatherbarrow as Caroline Carmen

Episode chronology
← Previous "Beyond a Joke"	Next → "Nanarchy"
- Red Dwarf VII

"Epideme" is the seventh episode of science fiction comedy series Red Dwarf VII and the 43rd in the series run. It was first broadcast on the British television channel BBC2 on 28 February 1997 and was written by Paul Alexander and Doug Naylor, and directed by Ed Bye. The episode involves Lister contracting an intelligent, but deadly, virus.

== Plot ==
The crew encounters an abandoned ship, the Leviathan, which is buried in the middle of an ice planetoid. In it, they find the frozen body of Caroline Carmen, who Lister (Craig Charles) claims is a former crush of his. She is taken on board the Starbug, where the crew attempts to thaw her out, but they are unable to melt the ice. That night, Carmen defrosts of her own accord and turns out to be in an advanced state of decomposition. She attacks Lister and spits part of her jaw and tongue down his throat, infecting him with Epideme (Gary Martin), an intelligent virus (with an annoying personality) that was supposed to cure nicotine addiction, but in practice kills its victims within 48 hours, then reanimates their corpse to find a new victim to transfer itself to.

Lister tries reasoning with Epideme directly through a communication link, but has no luck in convincing the virus to leave. Kochanski (Chloë Annett) comes up with a drastic plan to save Lister's life: coax the virus to move down toward Lister's hand and then cut off the hand, isolating the virus outside his body. However, they end up cutting off Lister's right arm instead of the left one as he had requested, and they only manage to dispose of part of the Epideme virus, with the result that they only succeed in prolonging Lister's life by an hour. Lister sneaks aboard the Leviathan with some explosives, intending to kill both himself and Epideme, but the virus talks him out of it by revealing that the destination of the Leviathan was Delta VII, a research base that might have a cure.

When Starbug arrives at Delta VII, it turns out that the planet has been destroyed in order to deal with a massive Epideme outbreak – a fact that the virus was fully aware of, and used in its attempt to prevent Lister from killing himself. With Lister on the verge of death, Kochanski injects Lister with a drug that stops his heart, then gets his corpse to bite her left hand, infecting it. After amputating her left arm she reveals that it was actually Caroline Carmen's arm, and that her own left arm is intact. Kryten (Robert Llewellyn) and Kochanski then revive the now virus-free but now one-armed Lister.

== Production ==
For Paul Alexander's second script, he used an old Jasper Carrott joke for the premise of the plot – "What if your flu could talk to you? Wouldn't it just say that it was doing its job?".

An alternate ending was scripted and filmed for the episode – involving the dead arm, containing the Epideme virus, flying through space and then towards the camera – but it was decided to end the episode just before this scene.

Of the many new props needed for the new series was a laser bone-saw – used for the scenes of severing the Epideme-infected arm. For the scene, Chloë Annett had taken several attempts to cut the arm off.

Gary Martin played Epideme, having been recommended by his long-time friend Danny John-Jules.

Nicky Leatherbarrow also appeared, in heavy make-up, as Caroline Carmen – the initial carrier of the Epideme virus.

== Reception ==
Originally broadcast on the British television channel BBC2 on 28 February 1997 in the 9:00 pm evening slot, this episode's television ratings were high. Although Series VII as a whole received a mixed response from fans and critics alike, this was considered one of the better episodes.

DVDActive thought the episode was "a nice idea, and one that is well-executed ... the final scene is one of the funniest of the series." DVD Verdict thought that this episode was the first in which the character of Kochanski finally "reached her stride" after all the "attitude and aggravation during those first few shows". Sci-Fi Online noted that the episode was "particularly reminiscent of Confidence and Paranoia, since it deals with a talking disease."
