= L.A. 7 =

- Also known as: S Club 7 in L.A.
- Starring: S Club 7 Linda Blair
- Opening theme: "Reach"
- Countries of origin: United Kingdom; United States
- Original language: English
- No. of series: 1
- No. of episodes: 13

Production
- Running time: 25 mins (approx)
- Production company: Initial

Original release
- Network: CBBC (on BBC One)
- Release: 6 April – 6 July 2000

Related
- Artistic Differences; S Club 7: Christmas Special; Miami 7 (1999); Hollywood 7 (2001); Viva S Club (2002)

L.A. 7 (known as S Club 7 in L.A. in the United States) is the second series in the BBC television series starring British pop group S Club 7. The programme was shown every week on CBBC, from 6 April 2000 to 6 July 2000 and stars all seven members of the band as fictionalized versions of themselves. The series featured the star from The Exorcist, Linda Blair as Joni, their landlord.

Like Miami 7, the show was renamed S Club 7 in L.A., and was shown on Fox Family in the United States, between 3 June 2000 and 30 September 2000. United Kingdom reruns of the show would occasionally aired, along with Miami 7, on now defunct cable channel Play UK.

== Plot ==
The second series saw the group enter Los Angeles hoping to make it big. After leaving Howard and Marvin in Miami, the group bump into Joni (The Exorcist star Linda Blair) who offers to rent them an apartment after she accidentally runs over Bradley on her rollerblades.

Once in Los Angeles, the group have to quickly deal with some of the realities of trying to seek an existence in order to become a pop band. They also start to become more Americanized. In the final episode, they decide to pack up and hit the road after their manager apparently fails to get them a record deal.

== Cast ==
- Tina Barrett as Tina
- Paul Cattermole as Paul
- Jon Lee as Jon
- Bradley McIntosh as Bradley
- Jo O'Meara as Jo
- Hannah Spearritt as Hannah
- Rachel Stevens as Rachel
- Linda Blair as Joni Witherspoon
- Paul Kreppel as Mr. Walters

== Episodes ==
=== Series 1 (2000) ===
No.	Title	Directed by	Written by	Featured song(s)	Original release date	US air date
1	"Into the Unknown"	Andrew Margeston	Kim Fuller	"I'll Be There"	6 April 2000	3 June 2000
Having decided against returning to England, the group head to L.A. On the way, Paul persuades the group to stop off at Ridgeback Woods to pay a visit to his long lost great uncle. The band decide to head into the woods, despite being told that a group of filmmakers had disappeared there previously. Then, the group run out of gas and are forced to stop the night in the woods. This episode parodies The Blair Witch Project, where a group of filmmakers become lost in the woods.
2	"Clever Camp"	Andrew Margeston	Paul Dornan	"Love Train"	13 April 2000	10 June 2000
The band realizes that they need money and Paul convinces a professor to give them jobs at his summer camp. The camp happens to be for very intelligent kids, who believe fun involves five-hour astrophysics sessions. S Club 7 decide they need more fun and less study and so they liven up the lessons. The group end up singing around the pool, and have a food fight with the students.
3	"Hello Hollywood"	Andrew Margeston	Kim Fuller	"Natural"	20 April 2000	17 June 2000
After finally arriving in L.A. to try to find fame and fortune, the gang realize they will need to find an agent to represent them and a place to live. They check into a poor motel, from which they get evicted the following morning. As a last resort, the band decide to sell their beloved Chevy to raise some money. Bradley ends up saving the day, when he gets run over by a manic roller blading ex-hippie, Joni (played by Linda Blair), who, feeling bad about the accident, invites the band to stay in one of her apartments. The group find an agent who organizes for the group to sing in the local café.
4	"Misguided"	Andrew Margeston	Paul Alexander	"I'll Keep Waiting"	27 April 2000	24 June 2000
Hannah lands a job as a Hollywood tour guide showing off the mansions of Beverly Hills to tourists. The fact that she does not know whose house is whose is soon forgotten when she catches a burglar breaking into the home of Hollywood film star Tommy DeWitt. Tommy rewards Hannah by taking her out on a date, making the other girls extremely jealous. But she soon discovers that there is no way she could ever love Tommy as much as he loves himself. Meanwhile, Paul finds himself talked into going on a date with Joni to impress her best friend, in order to repay Joni for the rent they cannot afford.
5	"The News"	Andrew Margeston	Georgia Pritchett	"Spiritual Love"	4 May 2000	8 July 2000
Paul falls in love with Linda, a bossy television newsreader, who constantly talks as if she is reading the news. The rest of the group are not impressed with Paul's new girlfriend, especially when she tells him to leave the band, because "news-reading is the only option". Meanwhile, after Rachel organises a gig at a surfing party, Hannah and Tina try to impress a couple of surfers by pretending they are surfers themselves. Jo also has problems when she cannot get to sleep with others. Jo cannot sleep either with Paul due to his loud snoring, or with Tina and Jon due to their constant chatting, or with Rachel and Hannah due to their extremely messy bedroom, or even with Bradley due to his constant sleep talking, sleep singing, sleep dancing and sleep hoovering.
6	"Prom"	Andrew Margeston	Georgia Pritchett	"Two in a Million"	11 May 2000	15 July 2000
The group decide that their current agent is not much good, so Joni recommends a better one. Their potential new agent decides that Rachel has to take his geeky son, Billy, to the prom in order to secure him as their agent. However, Rachel has already organized a date with the attractive Sam. Luckily Jo, Tina and Hannah are willing to step in and take Sam as their date. But he soon realizes that these three girls on one date can be a bit of a handful. Meanwhile, Jon falls in love when he spots a glimpse of a mysterious girl.
7	"House-Sitting"	Andrew Margeston	Paul Dornan	"Bring the House Down"	18 May 2000	22 July 2000
When Joni demands the rent for the apartment, none of the group can afford to pay it. There's nothing to do but to go find work, and so Paul, Jo, and Rachel decide to sign up with a house sitting agency. Their first task is to look after a huge, Bel-Air Mansion. The three decide to invite the others over and have a party. It all seems like a great idea until a group of bikers, invited by Tina, show up. The house ends up being trashed and the house sitting agency boss goes absolutely ballistic, just as the house's owner rolls up.
8	"Mr. Muscle"	Andrew Margeston	Paul Alexander and Simon Braithwaite	"Reach"	25 May 2000	5 August 2000
Tina gets a job as an exercise instructor down at Muscle Beach, where one of her pupils, Ryan, asks her out on a date. A little later on the same beach, Jon falls out with a bodybuilder type who tries to steal Jon's sunbed when he goes to get ice cream for himself and Rachel. The bodybuilder, who turns out to be Ryan, Tina's date, challenges Jon to an arm wrestle, which Jon agrees to. Tina has to try to persuade Ryan not to arm-wrestle with Jon, but Ryan does not want to look weak to his friends.
9	"Fall Out"	Andrew Margeston	Georgia Pritchett	"Stand by You"	1 June 2000	19 August 2000
Jon gets a job modelling for a catalogue and Rachel and Tina give him posing tips. Brad and Jo apply for the same job at Buddy's Burgers and have to dress up as a burger and a hot dog, but it all ends up in a big fight. Paul and Hannah play chess in order to find out which one of them will wash the dishes, but they also end up falling out over it. Jon's modelling job is a disaster and tempers are really frayed back at the flat, to such an extent that none of the band are talking to each other. However, when Joni returns, she shows the band Jon's advertisement for spot cream, and the gang cannot do anything but make up, and laugh together.
10	"Game Boy"	Andrew Margeston	Paul Alexander and Simon Braithwaite	"Cross My Heart"	8 June 2000	9 September 2000
Bradley becomes addicted to playing video games. He refuses food, sleeping and puts off the toilet until he reaches the next level. Eventually, the rest of S Club 7 have enough and decide to track down the creator of the game, Spike Donahue, head of a multi-billion computer games empire. That way they hope they can get the cheat codes from him, so that Bradley can get to finish the game. Spike turns out to be an obnoxious thirteen year old, who demands to kiss Hannah or else he will not give them the cheat codes. Meanwhile, Rachel, Jo and Hannah all audition for the same role of Zelda, Warrior Princess, in another video game.
11	"Making Movies"	Andrew Margeston	Kim Fuller	"Someday, Someway" & "S Club Party"	15 June 2000	16 September 2000
S Club 7's apartment is overrun by an ant infestation and Joni threatens to throw them out on the Streets. She happens to be emotional because her boyfriend has just dumped her, and is sensitive because of it. To escape from the ants, Joni's temper and the fact that this month's rent is due, Paul suggests that they make a movie. They decide to make a police movie and Jo and Rachel act as their thieves.
12	"Working"	Andrew Margeston	Paul Alexander and Simon Braithwaite	"All in Love is Fair"	22 June 2000	23 September 2000
S Club 7 accidentally blow all the fuses in their apartment block and have to pay someone to sort it before Joni finds out about it. Luckily, an electrician called Ernie agrees to fix the problem for $200. The group decide to get jobs in order to pay for the bill. Paul gets a paper round, Hannah works as a courier, Tina teaches aerobics in an old people's home, Jon and Jo become DJs on a classical radio station, Rachel becomes a dog walker and Bradley strips off to become a nude model.
13	"Goodbye, Hollywood"	Andrew Margetson	Paul Dornan	"Best Friend"	6 July 2000	30 September 2000
Joni decides to sell the apartment and so the band have to move out and move on. The group pack their bags and drive off, narrowly missing their agent who has come to tell them that he has gotten them a major record deal. After they miss him, the group drive off to wherever the road takes them.

=== Specials ===
Title	Directed by	Written by	Featured songs	Original release date	US air date
"Artistic Differences"	Jeff Jones	Paul Alexander and Simon Braithwaite	"Reach" "Bring the House Down" "Natural"	9 September 2000 (ITV)	11 February 2001
Shortly into driving away from Los Angeles, the group's car breaks down and they are forced to find $2,000 to pay for it and move into a new house offered by Joni in the meantime. The gang hear of a Battle of the Bands concert and decide to enter. However, as Hannah suffers from recurring nightmares about the group splitting up, complications start to ensue, as Rachel becomes a waitress and falls in love with a waiter who wants her to move with him to Las Vegas and open a restaurant together, and Bradley joins a rival boyband competing in the contest, which greatly angers Paul, especially as he is also dealing with his visiting hometown former girlfriend suddenly getting noticed and becoming a model who is more famous than him.
"S Club 7: Christmas Special"	Jeff Jones	Kim Fuller and Georgia Prichett	"Boy Like You" "Perfect Christmas" "Two In A Million"	24 December 2000 (ITV)	N/A
With the group feeling homesick for Christmas, they decide to try to raise enough money with jobs as a mall Santa and elves and a final gig in L.A. in order to fly back to England, blissfully unaware that a down on his luck music promoter is trying to find them to save his career. However, things go wrong as Hannah, Bradley and Paul are involved in a car crash, leaving the group with a dilemma on whether to stay in L.A. with an amnesiac Paul or return to England without him.

== Home releases ==
L.A. 7 was released on video in 2000. It was released both as three individual cassettes or in a "Complete Boxset" containing all thirteen episodes. Unlike Miami 7, this series was never released in the United States on video, nor was it ever released on DVD in the United States or the United Kingdom.
