= Duct Soup =

- Red Dwarf episode
- Episode no.: Series 7 Episode 4
- Directed by: Ed Bye
- Written by: Doug Naylor
- Original air date: 7 February 1997

Episode chronology
← Previous "Ouroboros"	Next → "Blue"
- Red Dwarf VII

"Duct Soup" is the fourth episode of science fiction sit-com Red Dwarf Series VII and the 40th in the series run. It was first broadcast on the British television channel BBC2 on 7 February 1997. It was written by Doug Naylor and directed by Ed Bye.

== Plot ==
Kristine Kochanski (Chloë Annett) is having a hard time on Starbug with no bath, poor food, and squeaking pipes in her sleeping quarters. Dave Lister (Craig Charles) arranges for her to have a bath in his quarters, and finds some extra clothing for her—gestures that worry Kryten (Robert Llewellyn) considerably. But before she can bathe, an engine failure leaves the crew trapped in Lister's quarters, and the ship is on a collision course with a meteor shower. The only way to re-fire the backup generator is by going through the service ducts.

As they navigate through the narrow ducts, Kochanski helps Lister with his claustrophobia, while Kryten and Cat (Danny John-Jules) look for any hatches that they can use to get back into Starbug. After dealing with water flushing through the vents, and hurricane-force winds to dry the ductways, Kryten admits that he planned the whole situation. He adjusted the thermosettings so it would overload and locked them in Lister's quarters. They eventually exit the ducts but end up back in Lister's quarters. Kryten makes another admission—the doors to Lister's quarters aren't locked after all; he excluded them from the shutdown override in case anything happened. Lister goes off to steer the ship away from disaster, while Kochanski asks Kryten to repeat the squeak noises that the pipes make while repeatedly hitting his head with a spanner (which she had been doing earlier to the squeaking pipes).

== Production ==
The episode overran by three minutes, and had to be cut down. Rather than lose vital scenes, it was decided that the opening titles would be replaced by a caption slide, to save precious time. The scenes would be reinstated for the X-tended edition on VHS release. This is the third episode of Red Dwarf to forfeit the opening titles for the purposes of time and episode pacing (the others being series II closer "Parallel Universe" and previous series VII episode "Ouroboros").

Being the last episode written, and the fact that the series had stretched the budget at that point, "Duct Soup" turned out to be the 'bottle show', a cheap production script that replaced the initially more expensive story that was written, "Identity Within".

== Reception ==
"Duct Soup" has received some mixed reviews. DVDActive complained that "the comedy is just not funny enough and, barring a few wonderful moments from the Cat, it's all a bit of a disappointment." Sci-Fi Online, on the other hand, called it "the best episode of the eight in this series" claiming that "as well as being a character study on a par with Series 3's Marooned, it boasts loads of great lines."

Writing in 2018, Sophie Davies of CultBox said "'Marooned' in series III, which similarly featured characters being trapped with each other and recounting stories about their lives, set a very high standard in this department. 'Duct Soup' never manages to meet this standard and none of its dialogue leaves much of an impression."
