= Beyond a Joke (Red Dwarf) =

- Red Dwarf episode
- Episode no.: Series 7 Episode 6
- Directed by: Ed Bye
- Written by: Robert Llewellyn; Doug Naylor
- Original air date: 21 February 1997

Guest appearances
- Don Henderson as The Simulant; Vicky Ogden as Mrs Bennet; Alina Proctor as Jane Bennet; Catherine Harvey as Kitty Bennet; Sophia Thierens as Lydia Bennet; Rebecca Katz as Mary Bennet; Julia Lloyd as Elizabeth Bennet

Episode chronology
← Previous "Blue"	Next → "Epideme"
- Red Dwarf VII

"Beyond a Joke" is the sixth episode of science fiction sitcom Red Dwarf Series VII and the 42nd in the series' run. It was first broadcast on the British television channel BBC2 on 21 February 1997. The script was written by Robert Llewellyn (who plays series regular Kryten) and Doug Naylor, and was directed by Ed Bye.

== Plot ==
Starbug passes an old derelict spaceship, the SS Centauri, which Kryten scavenges for supplies. He finds some live lobsters in stasis and brings them aboard to cook a fine supper. This is convenient, since it is exactly five years to the day since Kryten was rescued from the wreck of the Nova 5 and he was looking for a way to celebrate the anniversary. Meanwhile, Kochanski (Chloë Annett) decides to educate Lister (Craig Charles) and Cat (Danny John-Jules) on the finer points of etiquette by introducing them to a virtual reality rendition of "Pride and Prejudice Land" in "Jane Austen World". Kryten's plans for a lobster supper, which he had been preparing for two days, are scuppered by this. Kryten is beyond furious, and he decides to get everyone together for supper one way or the other. He enters the AR suite, his anger spiralling out of control, and knocks out some of the Bennet sisters; however, when this starts to go wrong he then brings in a tank from a World War II game and destroys the gazebo the crew are having tea in.

Back on Starbug, a very tense dinner is underway as Kryten has clearly gone off the deep end. Everyone is afraid to say anything to him, until Lister requests brown sauce to go with the lobster. This is too much for Kryten and he goes berserk, literally blowing his top—his head explodes. Lister suggests that they board the SS Centauri again and look for some spare mechanoid heads there. However, they discover a Rogue Simulant captain who has since commandeered the Centauri. Meanwhile, a GELF Kinitawowi tribesman, a partner of the Simulant, ransacks Starbug and steals the remains of Kryten. When the crew goes back aboard Starbug, the Simulant and the GELF then escape with Kryten aboard the Centauri. Starbug cannot catch up as the Centauri is much faster, travelling at warp speed.

On board the Centauri, the defect which caused Kryten to blow up his head is fixed. There Kryten meets another mechanoid named Able who is a servant to the Simulant and who, it turns out, is from the same batch as Kryten (a 4000 series) and carries the same serial number. This means that Kryten and Able are, in effect, brothers. However, Able is a "zoney"—he is addicted to a narcotic known as "otrazone" that is specially designed for mechanoids. Abuse of this has corrupted Able's circuit boards. Thanks to Kochanski's navigating skills, the crew soon end up in a standoff with the Simulant who, to prove he means business, gives Kryten the password to a secure file in his CPU that he's never been able to access. Lister is able to knock out the Simulant and Starbug flees with the rescued mechanoid brothers.

Kryten then later reveals to Lister the contents of the secret file the simulant revealed to him: the entire 4000 series of mechanoids was a spiteful joke by their creator, Professor Mamet. They were designed to be a parody of a fiancé who jilted her, and as such were made pompous, ridiculous looking, and overbearing. Further, all their negative emotions are stored on a "nega-drive" and when it becomes full they literally blow up. After Kryten is also made aware of the secret by the simulant, he starts to spiral into a similar depression that caused Able to turn to otrazone, although Lister comforts him by claiming that he has evolved beyond his original personality.

Unfortunately, the Centauri attacks them, and their attempts to hide in an asteroid belt are thwarted by Able accidentally revealing the location whilst rebounding on otrazone. In a final act of repentance, the crew are saved by Able who sacrifices his life for them by attacking the Centauri with the pent-up emotions stored in Kryten's nega-drive, enticing the simulant to destroy himself and his ship in a fit of depression. At the end, the Starbug crew visits the "Curryworld" AR program; unfortunately the curry is too hot even for Lister due to a "bug in the program".

== Production ==
Robert Llewellyn wrote this episode with the intent to feature very little of Kryten, as he increasingly disliked the application of the Kryten makeup. However, after numerous revisions of the script by Naylor, Kryten became an integral part of the episode, and Llewellyn also had to play the part of another mechanoid, Kryten's "brother", Able. This meant that, despite Llewellyn's original intention, he had to wear the Kryten makeup twice as much, as Able appeared in the same costume coloured green instead of black.

Production had to be halted whilst the cast and crew searched for one of Danny John-Jules' Cat's teeth, which was lost whilst filming the "Pride and Prejudice World" scenes in the lakeside gazebo as he ate grapes.

The Rogue Simulant captain was played by veteran British actor Don Henderson, known for the role of High General Tagge in the first Star Wars film, and for his TV role as George Bulman. This episode proved to be Henderson's last acting work, and he died soon after the episode was broadcast.

Other guest stars included Vicky Ogden as Mrs. Bennet, Alina Proctor as Jane Bennet, Catherine Harvey as Kitty Bennet, Sophia Thierens as Lydia Bennet, Rebecca Katz as Mary Bennet and Julia Lloyd as Elizabeth Bennet.

== Reception ==
"Beyond a Joke" has been seen by some critics as one of the weakest in the series. DVDActive felt that "the comedy falls a little flat" and particularly disliked the way that Kryten "contracts the Android equivalent of PMT." Sci-Fi Online thought that the episode had little going for it apart from "a couple of explosions."
