= The Castle (radio series) =

BBC Radio 4 comedy

The Castle is a BBC Radio 4 comedy set in the Middle Ages and referencing modern life: in the words of its own introduction, "a comedy set in the filth, grime, stench and brutality of the Middle Ages, with some nice music". The exact timeframe of the series is not fixed; one episode specifies it to be in the early 12th century, yet another references Joan of Arc. It is written by Kim Fuller and, from series 2, Paul Alexander with additional dialogue by Nick Doody, Matt Kirshen and Paul Dornan. It was first broadcast on 7 September 2007, at 11.30am, and a second series began on Friday 2 January 2009 in the same time slot. Series 3 debuted on Wednesday 14 July 2010. Series 4 began its broadcast in 2012. All four series were produced by David Tyler (producer) for Pozzitive Television.

== Episodes ==
=== Series 1 ===
1. The Joust - Sir William De Warenne moves into the castle next door and discovers the lovely Anne. Anne discovers gorgeous peasant Sam. Charlotte discovers that she is supposed to stay out of the way.
2. The Sam Plan - An unexpected lion and the world's first satellite dish spell trouble for Anne's hoped-for romance with Sam Tree.
3. The Party - Sir William decides to woo Lady Anne with a swearing cook and a chocolate fountain.
4. Themed Park - Sir John decides to open a "theme castle" but Sir William steals his idea, and Sam Tree decides to save Unicorn Forest from De Warenne's proposed casino.
5. The Recruitment - The village pub acquires two new mysterious barmaids as Anne and Charlotte plot to ensnare Sam Tree. Sir William De Warenne gets in touch with his feminine side whilst Duncan gets in touch with his masculine one.
6. Execution is an Art Form - Sir John tires of acting as the local magistrate, and hands the job over to Sir William who, having realized that Sam stands between him and Anne, uses his position to condemn Sam to death. Unfortunately (or fortunately), the scaffold is built using Thomas's latest invention - the flat pack.

=== Series 2 ===
1. Houston We Have A Problemme - Sir John seeks professional help for his depression, Sir William fails a health-and-safety inspection of his torture chamber and Sam departs Woodstock by rocket.
2. Nice To Gavotte You, To Gavotte You Nice - Anne seeks a replacement for Sam, her father falls for the exotic Countess de Totty (Katy Brand) and Sir William enters Celebrity Strictly Come Gavotting.
3. Is This A Turnip That I See Before Me? - A theatrical troupe led by Will Shakeshaft (Lewis MacLeod) visits the town, an opportunity that both Anne and De Warenne try to take advantage of.
4. Pool Party Of Doom - De Warenne invites his friend the Earl of Essex and his daughter Trish, hoping to flirt with the latter to make Anne jealous, whilst CSI arrives to investigate a murder victim from 15 years ago found by Time Team in Sir John's moat.
5. Be Sure To Wear Some Flowers In Your Visor - At Anne and Charlotte's urging, Sir John Woodstock puts on a rock music festival, much to the displeasure of the Pope, and Sir William gives a whole new meaning to "heavy metal".
6. Something Old, Something New, Something Borrowed, Something Filled With Helium - Lord Clarkson arrives and tries to get his hands of Sir John's estate by marrying Anne so Peter Stringfellow can build a lap-dancing club there, and Merlin uses helium to give Charlotte a breast enhancement in an attempt to distract Clarkson.

=== Series 3 ===
1. The Dragon Of Mass Destruction - Sir William is interrogated by the Chilcott Enquiry, Sir John receives a letter from Lady Lumley of Purdey, and Henry falls in love with Lady Lindsay de Lohan.
2. The Pilchards Of Doom - King Russell de Brand pays a visit, Sir John is challenged to a duel by Lady Lumley's husband, and Thomas attempts to discover the origins of the universe with the aid of Lord Hadron and his steed Collider.
3. The Snowballs Of Hell - During an exceptionally cold winter (in August), Sir John permits the whole village population to move into the castle for the duration, but gang warfare soon breaks out. Meanwhile, Charlotte gets intimate with Merlin and Anne catches up with an old flame.
4. The Vuvuzela Of Terror - Sir John struggles to convince His Majesty's Chancellor to pass his expense claims for moat-cleaning. To help justify the moat, Sir William stages a fake attack on the castle with some characters borrowed from Dad's Army.
5. Four Wiseguys And A Funeral - Sir William sets out to write his autobiography, but is visited by gangsters who threaten to reveal his darkest secret.
6. There's No Place Like Woodstock - Lord Andrew Lloyd Webber arrives in Woodstock, and stages a production of "The Wizard Of Oz" starring Lady Anne as Dorothy.

=== Series 4 ===
1. Tender is the Knight - Sir John fills his castle with wounded soldiers and De Warenne fills his trousers with ice. Plus a new valet arrives hotfoot from somewhere called Downton Abbey.
2. The Only Way is Ethics - Someone, or something, is hacking into peoples' private conversations and Master Henry could end up in jail. Meanwhile, Lady Anne has taken to nuzzling De Warenne's trusty War Horse.
3. Highlights and Twilights - Two mysterious visitors, one deathly pale and one deathly orange. It's the love that dare not speak its name and the love that can speak its name but can't pronounce it properly.
4. Boogie Knights - The wedding of the decade is almost ruined by 200 tents and an overexcited woodpecker, while Henry, Duncan and De Warenne gatecrash a rather special hen night.
5. Give Me the Flaming Torch - The Olympics are coming to Woodstock, so what better time for Sir William to go on a go-slow and for Henry to hunt for dragons? Meanwhile, Sir John tries to get fit.
6. A Term for the Worse - Anne's off to Cambridge, but Charlotte doesn't know the meaning of the word 'thick'. Literally. Is this the end of a beautiful friendship?

== Popular culture references ==
- In all episodes, musical interludes between scenes consist of well-known rock tunes such as "Paranoid" and "Relax", played in a medieval style, using instruments like the recorder and the lute.

=== Series 1 ===
- Episode 3: "broad carriage" in lieu of broadband, Gordon de Ramsay and a witch in lieu of Gordon Ramsay and Nigella Lawson, "What Ho!" and "Oi! Varlet" in magazine in place of Hello! magazine, "Make the Pox History!" in lieu of Make Poverty History, and the minstrel "Master James Blunt late of the king's army".
- Episode 4: Theméd park inventor Sir Walt-er de 'Isney, the architect Sir Richard de Rogers, and his Gherkin tower, and the building of a super casino.

=== Series 2 ===
- Episode 1: Falling property prices due to the 2008 financial crisis, Torturer's Question Time in reference to Gardener's Question Time, the Westfield Shopping Centre
- Episode 2: Prontascribe for Prontaprint, Sir Bruce Forsooth hosting Strictly Come Gavotting and John Sergeant's participation in it, recycling collections
- Episode 3: Various quotations from Shakespeare.
- Episode 4: the Boden catalogue; Bob Carolgees act with Spit the Dog who's catchphrase was "Sausages"; global warming; the Iraq War; Tony Robinson (McCloud), Time Team; Polish plumbers; droughts, water rationing; drug mules; De Warrene's friend the Earl of Essex as a stereotypical Chav white van man; CSI, staffed by Lord Howard Kane, Poirot, Scooby-Doo and Sherlock Holmes; the divorce of Lord McCartney
- Episode 6: An "exit strategy in the Holy Land" (comparing it to the Iraq War), the car/cart-obsessed Lord Clarkson, Tom-Tom the sat nav parrot with the voices of Terry Wogan, Billy Connolly and Kenneth Williams, the London congestion charge, Sir Peter Stringfellow opening a lap-dancing committee in the village, Jeremy Paxman hosting University Challenge (though England still only has two universities), the Stig

=== Series 3 ===
- Episode 1: Lady Lumley of Purdey, Lady Lindsay de Lohan, and the Chilcot Inquiry
- Episode 2: King Russell de Brand, Lord Hadron and his horse, Collider. Lady Lumley talks about the Gurkhas, and speaks to Sir John of becoming The Avengers, with her trusty "Steed" (a horse with a bowler).
- Episode 2: Global warming. Several gangs are mentioned including the Bloods and the Crips. Sam sings Three Lions claiming it to be a traditional song he learned as a boy. Merlin mentions Quidditch and uses the names Gandalf and David Lee Roth in a spell.
- Episode 4: Sir John is struggling with his expenses claims, Henry acquires a Vuvuzela, and Anne and Charlotte visit a medieval Tesco. Sir William raises a small army from among the peasants and finds himself dealing with characters sounding like Cpl. Jones and Pvt. Frazer from Dad's Army.
- Episode 5: Sir John and Sir William read the Daily (Chain) Mail and object to its right-wing content, arguing that even the warmongering Baron von Adolf find it too extreme. Sir William is visited by Antonio Soprano, and Merlin awakes to find a dead unicorn's head in his bed.
- Episode 6: Andrew Lloyd Webber arrives to stage a production of The Wizard of Oz; he is in the midst of a talent war with Master Cowell of Subo. Merlin acts the part of the Wizard in the voice of Rolf Harris.

== Cast ==
- Sir John Woodstock: James Fleet
- Lady Anne Woodstock, John's teenage daughter: Susan Earl (series 1) / Montserrat Lombard (series 2) / Martha Howe-Douglas (series 3–4)
- Lady Charlotte, Anne's best friend: Ingrid Oliver
- Master Henry Woodstock, John's 13-year-old son: Steven Kynman
- John's household servant Thomas, forever inventing medieval versions of modern innovations (central heating, radio, satellite dishes, microwave, parachute): Jonathan Kydd (Kydd was only credited as Duncan in series 1, but series 2 corrected this error)
- Sir William De Warenne, knight errant and scourge of the Levant, voted top knight by Esquire magazine: Neil Dudgeon
- Cardinal Duncan, Sir William's closet-homosexual sidekick: Jonathan Kydd
- Sam Tree, Anne's peasant heart-throb: Toby Ross-Bryant (series 1) / Steven Kynman (series 2 & 3)
- Merlin, a rather hopeless sorcerer and Anne's second peasant heart-throb: Lewis MacLeod (series 2–3)
- Billy Bagshot, local standup comedian: Steven Kynman
- Jedediah Wainwright, a local busybody who speaks up in every public forum, claiming to represent organizations like the "Public Morals Committee" or "Environmental Committee", objecting to whatever is being proposed, declaring "It's outrageous!": Steven Kynman (series 2 onwards)
- Bates, Sir John's new valet: Lewis MacLeod (series 4)
