= Work Experience (film) =

1989 film

- Directed by: James Hendrie
- Written by: James Hendrie
- Produced by: Mary Bell
- Starring: Lenny Henry; Kathy Burke
- Cinematography: Robin Vidgeon
- Edited by: Annabel Ware
- Music by: Simon Brint
- Production company: North Inch Production
- Distributed by: Channel Four Films
- Release date: 1989
- Running time: 11 minutes
- Country: United Kingdom
- Language: English

Work Experience is a 1989 British short comedy film directed by James Hendrie and starring Lenny Henry and Kathy Burke. It won the Academy Award for Best Live Action Short Film at the 62nd Academy Awards.

== Cast ==
- Lenny Henry as Terence Weller
- Kathy Burke as Sally
- Neil Pearson as Greg
- Shelagh Fraser
