= Ouroboros (Red Dwarf) =

- Red Dwarf episode
- Episode no.: Series 7 Episode 3
- Directed by: Ed Bye
- Written by: Doug Naylor
- Original air date: 31 January 1997

Guest appearances
- Gary Bleasdale as Frank; Juliet Griffiths as Barmaid; Adrienne Posta as Flight Announcer; Alexander John-Jules as Baby Lister

Episode chronology
| ← Previous "Stoke Me a Clipper" | Next → "Duct Soup" |
- Red Dwarf VII

"Ouroboros" is the third episode of science fiction sitcom Red Dwarf Series VII and the 39th in the series run. It was first broadcast on the British television channel BBC2 on 31 January 1997 and was written by Doug Naylor and directed by Ed Bye. It was the first episode not to feature Arnold Rimmer (although he does make a minor cameo in a flashback), and also the first to feature Kristine Kochanski as a regular character, having only appeared previously as a minor recurring character.

== Plot ==
In the Aigburth Arms pub in Liverpool in 2155, a man named Frank discovers a baby in a box under the pool table. On the box is written "OUROB OROS": the barmaid deplores the fact that his unknown parents could not even decide what name to give him (or how to spell it), interpreting the writing as a misspelling of "our Rob or Ross". The barmaid declares

I wonder what will become of him? Something terrible, no doubt!

On Starbug, Kryten (Robert Llewellyn), Lister (Craig Charles) and the Cat (Danny John-Jules) encounter a temporal disturbance, which they are unable to avoid.

Passing through, they discover a temporal rift, through which they encounter an alternative Starbug crew, with some minor differences: in this reality, it is Lister who is the hologram, having failed to survive the accident that wiped out the crew. He explains to the human Lister that in their reality, Kochanski (Chloë Annett) found out that he had smuggled Frankenstein on board the ship and took the cat away from him. As a result, Lister was not put into stasis as he was not caught breaking quarantine regulations. In fact, it was Kochanski who ended up in stasis, and to Lister's delight, she is alive, and with the alternative crew. There is no hologram Rimmer in this dimension, Lister having been brought back as a hologram to keep Kochanski sane. They are accompanied by Kryten and the Cat.

Kochanski asks Lister to donate a sperm sample into a tube, for a potential future baby, which Lister initially interprets as a sexual advance. During the conversation the temporal rift is broken as a GELF warship attacks the link and breaks it. Kochanski nearly falls through the link into the endless void of non-space. She is saved by the crew of Starbug, but ends up on the wrong side of the link.

Waking on Starbug, Kochanski smothers Lister with kisses, thinking he is her Lister, and old Dave is not too eager to point out her error, though Kryten does try, to no avail. Heading to the cockpit, the crew finds that the GELFs are after Lister in order to return him to his wife. Kochanski uses her advanced knowledge to help them to lose the pursuing GELF ship, leading it down onto an asteroid, where it crashes. Lister tells her that they cannot re-establish the link with her ship's reality, so she is stuck with them for the moment and if they do not find the temporal disturbance in time she will be stuck. Both Kochanski and Kryten are unhappy at this prospect.

The link is eventually re-established and Kochanski prepares to leave. As they load aboard some supplies from Kochanski's ship, Lister sees a crate with a strange symbol and asks about it. Kryten explains that the symbol, a snake eating its own tail, represents infinity. The symbol is on the crate because it contained everlasting batteries... called Ouroboros batteries, Ouroboros being the name of the symbol. Lister realises that the box he was found in did not say "our Rob or Ross" but "Ouroboros" and suddenly works out the mystery behind his abandonment: The in vitro tube Kochanski has is Lister himself, and at some point after the baby is born he will need to go back in time and leave him at the Aigburth Arms, writing "Ouroboros" on the box so he would be able to work it out at this point in time. Lister begins to try and come to terms with the fact that he is his own father, and Kochanski is not only his ex-girlfriend but also his mother, before realising he needs to get the tube back from Kochanski.

Unfortunately, as he runs to Kochanski to get the tube, the GELFs attack again and the link breaks with Kochanski stuck on the wrong side.

Eighteen months later, Lister uses the time drive to send himself and his baby son back to the Aigburth Arms in 2155. He explains to the baby that he is not being abandoned like he will initially believe, but is instead being placed there to maintain the unbreakable circle as a "holding pattern". Now these events will always repeat themselves, and through that the human race will never truly become extinct. After bidding his child goodbye, Lister puts him under the pool table in a box marked "Ouroboros" and leaves seconds before Frank walks in.

== Production ==
The episode overran by a few minutes, and had to be cut down. Rather than lose vital scenes, it was decided that the opening titles would be omitted to save time. The scenes would be reinstated for the X-tended edition on VHS release. This is the second episode of Red Dwarf to forfeit the opening titles for the purposes of time and episode pacing (the first being the series II closer "Parallel Universe").

Guest actors included Gary Bleasdale as Frank, Juliet Griffiths as Barmaid, Adrienne Posta as Flight Announcer and Alexander John-Jules (Danny John-Jules' nephew) as "Baby Lister".

The Aigburth Arms (where the opening scene takes place) is named after a real Liverpool pub which Rob Grant and Doug Naylor used to frequent. It was briefly renamed "The Victoria", but has since rebranded back.

== Reception ==
"Ouroboros" was the first episode to feature Kristine Kochanski as a regular character. One reviewer said that "Chloe Annett as Kristine Kochanski ... proved a wonderful choice. Annett's presence ... provided balance for the reduced role of Rimmer." However, DVDActive called Ouroborus "the weakest episode" of the series, and noted that Kryten's more neurotic personality traits were "initially interesting [but] the sight of a blubbing robot gets very irritating very quickly." Sci-Fi Online liked the episode, and thought that it "contains a great central concept and impressive model and CGI effects."

Writing in 2018, Sophie Davies of CultBox said "'Ouroboros' serves as a rather messy introduction to a new character", and continues "Rather than having her arrival as the main focus of the episode, there is also, for some reason, a plot about Lister being his own father and Kochanski being his mother."

== See also ==
- Ouroboros

Other stories featuring characters descended from themself:

- "'—All You Zombies—'", a short story by Robert Heinlein
- The Man Who Folded Himself, a novel by David Gerrold
- "Roswell That Ends Well", an episode of Futurama
- "Trials and Tribble-ations", an episode of Star Trek: Deep Space Nine, includes a scene where Dr. Julian Bashir discusses this concept
