= Tikka to Ride =

- Red Dwarf episode
- Episode no.: Series 7 Episode 1
- Directed by: Ed Bye
- Written by: Doug Naylor
- Original air date: 17 January 1997

Guest appearances
- Michael J. Shannon as John F. Kennedy; Toby Aspin as Lee Harvey Oswald; Peter Gaitens as FBI Agent; Robert Ashe as Cop

Episode chronology
← Previous "Out of Time"	Next → "Stoke Me a Clipper"
- Red Dwarf VII

"Tikka To Ride" is the first episode of science fiction sitcom Red Dwarf Series VII and the 37th in the series run. It was first broadcast on the British television channel BBC2 on 17 January 1997. It was written by Doug Naylor and directed by Ed Bye and was the first episode not to involve co-creator and writer Rob Grant.

Series VII was the first series to have extended episodes.

== Plot ==
Lister (Craig Charles) makes a video explaining how the crew survived their battle with their future selves. If the future crew had killed their former selves, they would have eliminated their own existence, and therefore not have been able to destroy themselves—a temporal paradox. Therefore, time has reset to a point before the crew picked up the time drive. Lister's explanation is too convoluted for the video camera to handle, and it explodes. Kryten (Robert Llewellyn) dismisses the whole incident as "garbled" and more "boring than an in-flight magazine produced by Air Belgium."

The crew discovers that, among Starbug's damages from the battle, its entire supply of Indian food has been lost. Lister proposes that the crew replenish the supply by obtaining the time drive again to go back in time to an Indian takeaway and order 500 curries. Rimmer (Chris Barrie), Cat (Danny John-Jules), and Kryten oppose the idea, having seen the kind of people they could possibly become. Lister argues that they can use a time drive and avoid that consequence if they do not abuse it like their future selves did; however, he finds himself outnumbered and seemingly concedes defeat. That night, Kryten shuts down so he can delete his unnecessary cache files to create more memory space. However, Lister swaps Kryten's head for one of his spare heads and removes the guilt chip from it, to ensure he will side with the time travel idea. The next morning, Rimmer and Cat are confused when Kryten serves them high calorie breakfasts, starts smoking, and using phrases like "you bet your ass". However, when Kryten assures them it will be okay to pick up the time drive the two relent and board the ship containing it, intending to go back to the 21st century to one of Lister's favourite curry houses to pick up a bulk order.

Their time travel calculations are inaccurate and the crew arrive in Dallas, Texas, on 22 November 1963. They appear at the Texas School Book Depository just as Lee Harvey Oswald is firing at U.S. President John F. Kennedy. Having inadvertently knocked him out the window onto the window ledge, they accidentally cause Oswald to fall to his death below when he tries to re-enter the Depository, thereby preventing Kennedy's assassination. Confronted by the Dallas Police Department, who believe that they are the assassins, the crew use the time travel device to go three years forward to 1966.

The crew find 1966 Dallas deserted. Wandering the streets, they discover a man who has been trampled to death, suggesting people left in a panic. Reading a nearby newspaper, Kryten learns what has happened: Kennedy, who was unharmed in the assassination attempt, promptly became the center of a massive scandal surrounding him sharing a mistress with American Mafia boss Sam Giancana, and was impeached in 1964 before being sentenced to three years in an open prison in July 1965; meanwhile, J. Edgar Hoover became President, but was blackmailed by the Mafia into doing their bidding. Hoover was forced to allow the Soviet Union to install a nuclear installation in Cuba in return for permitting Mafia cocaine trafficking between Cuba and the U.S.. With Soviet nuclear weapons now 30 miles from the U.S. mainland, people fled America's major cities, fearing an imminent nuclear exchange.

As the Soviets likely won the Space Race in this alternate timeline, Starbug no longer exists and the crew cannot return to the present. The crew attempt to correct the situation by returning to the day of the shooting and driving Oswald to a higher floor in the building, but this plan still fails to lead to Kennedy's death; by sending Oswald up another floor, they made the shot's trajectory so steep that Kennedy was merely wounded. Being unable to send Oswald to a lower floor due to their presence, Lister suggests getting a second gunman to shoot from behind a nearby grassy knoll. With none of the crew willing to shoot the president themselves, Lister travels to Idlewild Airport in 1965 and persuades a post-impeachment Kennedy to travel back to 1963, become a "second gunman" on the grassy knoll, and shoot himself to restore his place in history.

The plan works: Kennedy shoots his past self and the timeline is restored. Kennedy grimly thanks the crew for the chance to restore himself to his proper place in history, and fades away as a result of the resetting timeline. Lister then realises he forgot to ask Kennedy for the names of any good Indian takeaways in Dallas. Having seen that Lister has learned absolutely nothing from the experience, the other members of the crew give him a deserved beating for all he has put them through.

=== Extended Edition alternate ending ===
Shown as an option on the Series 7 DVD, the Extended Edition of "Tikka to Ride" continues after Cat, Rimmer and Kryten take out their frustrations on Lister. After managing to correctly use the time drive and steal the Indian food supplies from Starbug before the events of the episode began (thus showing an example of a predestination paradox and allowing Lister to re-stock on curry, papadums, and lager), the crew end up storing the food in one of Starbug's cargo holds (B-deck, ostensibly the same cargo hold it was inside in the first place). Rimmer leaves with Kryten in tow, but remarks "I must've passed this thing a million times. What the hell's it for?" in regard to a lever by the door. Giving in to the curiosity, Lister pulls the lever, which jettisons the entire rear section of the Starbug into space while allowing the front to fly away, an ace Rimmer had "had up his sleeve for months". Lister, now stranded alone in deep space with nothing but three-and-a-half tons of curry, says he could not be happier, and eagerly digs in.

== Production ==
Even though the previous series had ended on a cliffhanger, fans had been forced to wait three years for the resolution. This was due to a number of factors, which included Craig Charles being imprisoned before being cleared of a charge of rape, Chris Barrie making no secret of his desire to leave the show, and most notably Rob Grant deciding to leave the series, ending his and Doug Naylor's long-standing writing partnership. Naylor was left with the choice of either ending or continuing the series. Although tempted to end it, he later agreed to write two more eight-episode series of the show, as this would allow the episode count to reach 52 and therefore be eligible for syndication.

"Tikka to Ride" ushered in new production values. The cinematic quality and filming of the new episodes meant that the studio audience was no longer viable (however the show was shown to an audience at a later date and their laughter was added). Also the special effects were increasing every series and the majority of the episodes were pre-recorded. One of Naylor's desires for a seventh series was the prospect of international syndication and a movie. This vision was helped with the return of Ed Bye to the director's chair, having previously left due to a scheduling clash with directing his wife Ruby Wax's new TV show at the time. He agreed to return to helm the seventh series, his first Red Dwarf episode since Series IV's "Meltdown".

The arrival of the seventh series was also promoted by the show making its first appearance of the front cover of the Radio Times.

Guest stars included Michael J. Shannon who played John F. Kennedy, Toby Aspin as Lee Harvey Oswald, Peter Gaitens as FBI Agent and Robert Ashe as Cop.

The deserted Dallas scenes were filmed at Farnborough Airport. The expanded Starbug cargo deck scenes were filmed inside the former Royal Aircraft Establishment wind tunnels at Farnborough. The motorcade scenes were filmed at the Chobham test track, with additional crowd shots filmed around buildings at Shepperton Studios.

== Cultural and historical references ==
The title of this episode is a piece of word-play based on the name of the song "Ticket to Ride" by the Beatles, in accordance with the theme of curry on which the storyline focuses, tikka being an Indian spice marinade.

When on the Grassy Knoll, Lister, Rimmer and Cat are dressed up as tramps, an outfit which the normally vain and shallow Cat would not be seen dead in: "Superficial is my middle name". This was based on the three tramps, men that are reported to have been found in a boxcar behind the Grassy Knoll when the police searched it after the shooting, but were later released. Conspiracy theorists have assumed that they were part of the assassination plot.

The concept of the crew travelling backwards in time and accidentally saving someone's life, leading to a change for the worse in history, was also used in the Star Trek episode "The City on the Edge of Forever". In each case the person saved was actually an advocate of peace; however, there were few other similarities between the episodes. The concept of saving president John F. Kennedy, thus inadvertently changing the timeline for the worse, and having to go back and assassinate him from the grassy knoll was a proposed story Gene Roddenberry repeatedly pressured the studio to make into a Star Trek movie, without success.

In the commentary for the Series III episode "Timeslides" when talking about Kryten's shouting "Duck!" at the Grassy Knoll line, they note how their characters actually did something similar later on.

== Reception ==
"Tikka to Ride" has generally been well received by critics. DVDActive called it "a promising start to the series" and noted that it was "beautifully shot, with a movie-style score". DVD Verdict stated "what other sitcom, sci-fi or otherwise, would take on the Kennedy Assassination and an alternative future for the United States had the beloved President not been felled by a rain of bullets?" and concluded that the episode "was majestic". Sci-Fi Online noted that "'Tikka to Ride' morphs into a surprisingly serious time paradox" but felt that the final plot twist was "a largely pointless contrivance." BellaOnline called the episode "pure silliness, and I mean of the kind that makes Red Dwarf great."

== See also ==
- Assassination of John F. Kennedy in popular culture
