= Kim Fuller =

British screenwriter

Kim Fuller (born 15 June 1951 in Hastings, England) is an English writer for film, radio and television. He is the brother of music manager and Idols series creator Simon Fuller.

== Career ==
Kim Fuller has been writing for television for over 40 years but is largely known for writing the television and film aspects of Simon Fuller's artists. Fuller has written for a number of successful television comedy programmes including Not The Nine O'Clock News, on which he first met Mel Smith; Carrott's Lib, starring Jasper Carrott; The Lenny Henry Show; Spitting Image; and Red Dwarf. Fuller was also writer and producer of The Complete Guide To Relationships, Miami 7 and L.A. 7, the latter two of which followed the adventures of chart-topping group S Club 7. LA 7 was the highest rated children's show in the UK, achieving a worldwide audience of over 90 million. Fuller has also worked on the BBC Radio Four comedy series The Castle.

Fuller spent some time in the United States writing on network comedy shows including The Tracey Ullman Show and Tracey Takes On....

Feature film credits to date include Lenny Live and Unleashed, starring Lenny Henry, and Spice World, starring pop group The Spice Girls.

== Work ==
=== Film ===
- Lenny Live and Unleashed (co-writer with Lenny Henry, 1989)
- Spice World (1997, nominated for a Golden Raspberry Award for Worst Screenplay)
- High Heels and Low Lifes (2001)
- From Justin to Kelly (2003, nominated for a Golden Raspberry Award for Worst Screenplay)
- Seeing Double (2003)
- Mashup Movie (2009)

=== Radio ===
- The Castle

=== Television ===
- Not the Nine O'Clock News
- Three of a Kind (1981–1983)
- Carrott's Lib (1982–1983)
- Alas Smith and Jones (1984–1988)
- Spitting Image (1984–1996)
- The Tracey Ullman Show (1987–1990)
- Tracey Ullman: A Class Act (1993)
- Tracey Takes On... (1996–1999)
- Red Dwarf (co-writer of the 1997 episode Blue)
- Miami 7 (1999)
- The Nearly Complete and Utter History of Everything (1999)
- L.A. 7 (2000)
- Hollywood 7 (2001)
- Viva S Club (2002)
- Lenny Henry in Pieces (2003)
- I Dream (2004)
- Berrys way, a BBC1 comedy-drama (2006)
- Badly Dubbed Porn / Porn School (2005–2007)
