= James Hendrie (writer) =

English producer

James Hendrie is an English writer, producer, and director who has mostly written for television shows such as After You've Gone, Home Again, My Family, Spitting Image, and Carrott's Lib. He has been a comedy writer with Ian Brown since 1982.

Hendrie wrote and directed the movie Work Experience, for which he won an Academy Award for Best Live Action Short Film.
