= Red Dwarf =

British comedy science fiction programme

- Logo (1992–99)
- Genre: Sitcom; Science fiction
- Created by: Rob Grant; Doug Naylor
- Based on: Dave Hollins: Space Cadet by: Rob Grant; Doug Naylor
- Directed by: Ed Bye (1988–91, 1997–99); Juliet May (1992); Grant Naylor (1992); Andy De Emmony (1993); Doug Naylor (2009–20)
- Starring: Chris Barrie; Craig Charles; Danny John-Jules; Norman Lovett; Hattie Hayridge; Robert Llewellyn; Chloë Annett
- Composers: Howard Goodall (1988–2017); Paul Farrer (2020)
- Country of origin: United Kingdom
- Original language: English
- No. of series: 12, and 1 TV film
- No. of episodes: 74 (list of episodes)

Production
- Executive producers: Paul Jackson (1988–89); Rob Grant (1992–93); Doug Naylor (1992–2020); Charles Armitage (2009–12); Simon Lupton (2016–17); Henry Normal (2016–17); Simon L. Edwards (2017); Christine Langan (2020)
- Producers: Ed Bye (1988–91, 1997–99); Rob Grant (1989–91); Doug Naylor (1989–91); Hilary Bevan-Jones (1992); Justin Judd (1993); Jo Howard and Helen Norman (2009); Richard Naylor (2012–20); Kerry Waddell (2016–17)
- Camera setup: Multi-camera (Series I–VI, VIII, X–The Promised Land); Single-camera (Series VII, Back to Earth)
- Running time: 28–30 minutes (Series I–VIII, X–XII); 25 minutes (per part) (Back to Earth); 90 minutes (The Promised Land)
- Production companies: Paul Jackson Productions (1988–89); Grant Naylor Productions (1991–2020); Baby Cow Productions (2016–20)
- Budget: £250,000 per episode

Original release
- Network: BBC Two
- Release: 15 February 1988 – 5 April 1999
- Network: Dave
- Release: 10 April 2009 – 9 April 2020

Red Dwarf is a British science fiction comedy programme created by Rob Grant and Doug Naylor that originally aired on BBC Two from 1988 to 1999, and was revived by Dave airing from 2009 to 2020. The programme follows low-ranking technician Dave Lister, who awakens after being in suspended animation for three million years to find that he is the last living human, and that he is alone on the mining spacecraft Red Dwarf—except for a hologram of his deceased bunkmate Arnold Rimmer and "Cat", a life form which evolved from Lister's pregnant cat.

The cast included Chris Barrie as Rimmer, Craig Charles as Lister, Danny John-Jules as Cat, Robert Llewellyn as the sanitation droid Kryten, and Norman Lovett and Hattie Hayridge as the ship's computer, Holly. Twelve series of the show have aired (including one miniseries), in addition to a feature-length special The Promised Land. Four novels were published from 1989 to 1996. Two pilot episodes of an American version of the show were produced but never aired. The magazine The Red Dwarf Smegazine was published from 1992 to 1994.

In 1994 an episode from the sixth series, "Gunmen of the Apocalypse", won an International Emmy Award in the Popular Arts category. In the same year, the series was also awarded Best BBC Comedy Series at the British Comedy Awards. The series attracted its highest ratings, of more than eight million viewers, during the eighth series, in 1999.

The revived series on Dave had some of the highest ratings for non–Public Service Broadcasting commissions in the UK. Series XI was voted Best Returning TV Sitcom and Comedy of the Year for 2016 by readers for the British Comedy Guide. In a 2019 ranking by Empire, Red Dwarf came 80th on a list of the 100 best TV shows of all time.

== Setting ==
Red Dwarf's design from Series X (2012) and onwards

The main setting of the series is the eponymous mining spaceship Red Dwarf. In the first episode an on-board radiation leak kills everyone except lowest-ranking technician Dave Lister, who is in suspended animation at the time, as punishment for smuggling a cat aboard the ship. The cat, Frankenstein, who is revealed to be pregnant, is safe in the cargo hold. Following the accident, the ship's computer Holly keeps Lister in stasis until the radiation levels return to normal—a process that takes three million years. Lister therefore emerges as the last human being in the universe—but not alone on board the ship. His former bunkmate and immediate superior Arnold Judas Rimmer (a character plagued by failure) is resurrected by Holly as a hologram to keep Lister sane. They are joined by a creature known only as Cat, apparently the last member of a race of humanoid felines that evolved in the ship's hold from Lister's pregnant cat during the three million years that Lister was in stasis.

The series revolves around Lister being the last human alive, after three million years of travel from Earth, with his companions. The crew encounter phenomena such as time distortions, faster-than-light travel, mutant diseases and strange lifeforms (all evolved from Earth, because the series has no aliens) that had developed in the intervening millions of years.

Despite the pastiche of science fiction used as a backdrop, Red Dwarf is primarily a character-driven comedy, with science fiction elements used as complementary plot devices. Especially in the early episodes, a recurring source of comedy was the Odd Couple-style relationship between the two central characters of the show, who have an intense dislike for each other yet are trapped together deep in space.

=== Later series ===
In Series III, Holly is recast with Hattie Hayridge replacing Norman Lovett, and the mechanoid Kryten (who had appeared in one episode in Series II) joins the crew and becomes a regular character, played by Robert Llewellyn.

Holly is not present in Series VI or the majority of Series VII as the show is set in the smaller Starbug craft, with Red Dwarf itself having been lost. Early in series VII, Rimmer departs, and is replaced by Kristine Kochanski, Lister's long-term love interest, from an alternate universe. Kochanski becomes a regular character for Series VII and VIII.

At the end of Series VII and start of Series VIII, the crew are reunited with a reconstructed version of the original Red Dwarf, complete with the original crew, who have been resurrected, and Norman Lovett's Holly. The series ends with a metal-eating virus loose on Red Dwarf. The entire crew evacuate save the main cast (Lister, Rimmer, Cat, Kryten, and Kochanski), whose fates are unresolved in a cliffhanger ending.

Series IX onwards revert to the same four main characters of Series 3–6 (Lister, Rimmer, Cat and Kryten), on Red Dwarf and without Kochanski or Holly; Rimmer reappears as a hologram once again. The exact identity of Rimmer is left vague; but series-creator Doug Naylor confirmed in 2020 that the Rimmer from Back To Earth onwards is the original Rimmer.

== Characters and actors ==
From left to right: Cat, Rimmer, Kryten, and Lister as they appeared in Series X (2012)

- Craig Charles as David "Dave" Lister:
  A technician on the Red Dwarf, who was the lowest-ranking of the original crew. A Scouser and self-described "bum" who has a good heart but is also very lazy. He is the only surviving member of the crew and the last known surviving human being.
- Chris Barrie as Arnold Judas Rimmer (regular series I-VI, VIII-The Promised Land, recurring VII):
  Lister's bunkmate and direct superior. Holly, considering him to be the person most likely to keep Lister sane, selects him to be the ship's one available hologram, recreating Rimmer's appearance and personality as he was before his death. Now the de facto leader of the Red Dwarf, he is despised by the rest of the crew due to his fussy, bureaucratic, neurotic, insecure, and cowardly personality, and has a particularly abrasive relationship with Lister.
- Danny John-Jules as the Cat:
  A humanoid creature with cat-like teeth who evolved from the offspring of Lister's smuggled pet cat Frankenstein. The Cat or simply "Cat" (who is never given an actual name) is self-centred and concerned with little other than sleeping, eating, and fawning over his appearance, and tends not to socialise with other members of the crew in early episodes. Over time, he grows closer to his crewmates and becomes a useful part of the crew.
- Norman Lovett (regular series I–II, VIII, The Promised Land; guest series VII, XII) and Hattie Hayridge (guest series II; regular series III–V) as Holly:
  The ship's computer, who has developed, in the future, "computer senility". Following an absence in Series VI, male Holly returns in the Series VII finale.
- David Ross (guest series II) and Robert Llewellyn (regular series III–The Promised Land) as Kryten 2X4B-523P:
  A sanitation android rescued from the crashed spaceship Nova 5 in the first episode of series 2; bound by his "behavioural protocols", he is taught independent thinking by Lister and leaves the Red Dwarf to enjoy his newfound freedom. He is reintroduced in series III, as part of the Red Dwarf crew. Categorised as a "series 4000 service mechanoid", He demonstrates proficiency with technology and encyclopedic knowledge of the universe; he maintains a strong friendship with Lister throughout the series.
- Clare Grogan (recurring series I; guest series II, VI) and Chloë Annett (regular series VII–VIII; guest series IX) as Kristine Kochanski:
  A navigation officer in the original Red Dwarf crew whom Lister had a crush on (later retconned to be his ex-girlfriend). An alternate version of Kochanski from a universe in which she, not Lister, is the last living human, joins the cast in the series VII episode "Ouroboros". She has a conflictual relationship with Kryten, who is jealous of the interest Lister has for her. She does not appear after Back to Earth, where her departure was a plot point.

=== Casting ===
Alan Rickman and Alfred Molina auditioned for roles in the series, with Molina being cast as Rimmer. However, after Molina had difficulties with the concept of the series, and of his role in particular, the role was recast and filled by Chris Barrie, a professional voice actor and impressionist who had previously worked with both the writers on Spitting Image and with the producers on Happy Families and Jasper Carrott productions. Craig Charles, a Liverpudlian "punk poet", was given the role of Dave Lister. He was approached by the production team for his opinion about the "Cat" character, as they were concerned it may be considered by people as racist. Charles described "Cat" as "pretty cool" and after reading the script he decided he wanted to audition for the part of Dave Lister. Laconic stand-up comedian Norman Lovett, who had originally tried out for the role of Rimmer, was kept in the show as Holly, the senile computer of the titular ship. A professional dancer and singer, Danny John-Jules, arriving half an hour late for his appointment, stood out as the Cat immediately. This was partly due to his "cool" exterior, dedicated research (reading Desmond Morris's book Catwatching), and his showing up in character, wearing his father's 1950s-style zoot suit.

== Production ==
The first series aired on BBC2 in 1988, followed by an additional eleven series, one miniseries, and a feature-length special being produced since then.

=== Concept and commission ===
The concept for the show was originally developed from the sketch series Dave Hollins: Space Cadet on the BBC Radio 4 show Son of Cliché in the mid-1980s, written by Rob Grant and Doug Naylor. Their influences came from films and television programmes including Star Trek (1966), Silent Running (1972), Dark Star (1974), Alien (1979) and The Hitchhiker's Guide to the Galaxy (1981), but also included British-style comedy and satire, ultimately moulded into the form of a sitcom. Having written the pilot script in 1984, the writers pitched their unique concept to the BBC, but it was rejected on fears that a science fiction sitcom would not be popular.

It was finally accepted by BBC North West in 1986, a result of a spare budget being assigned for a second series of Happy Families that would never arise, and producer Paul Jackson's insistence that Red Dwarf should be filmed instead. The show was fortunate to be remounted after an electricians' strike partway through rehearsals in early 1987 shut the entire production down (the title sequence was filmed in January 1987). The filming was rescheduled for September, and the pilot episode was finally broadcast on 15 February 1988.

Despite the commission of further series, the cast felt like "outsiders" at the BBC. Co-creator Doug Naylor attributed this to the show being commissioned by BBC Manchester, but its being filmed at Shepperton Studios near where the cast lived in London. When the show won an International Emmy Award in 1994, Naylor's attempts to have the cast invited to a party thrown by the BBC proved futile when they objected to Craig Charles' and Danny John-Jules' inclusion, claiming they were "fire risks".

=== Writing, producing and directing ===
Grant and Naylor wrote the first six series together. Grant left in 1995, to pursue other projects, leaving Naylor to write series VII and VIII with a group of new writers, including Paul Alexander and actor Robert Llewellyn (who portrayed the character Kryten).

For the most part, Ed Bye produced and directed the series. He left before Series V due to a scheduling clash so Juliet May took over as director. May parted ways with the show halfway through the series and Grant and Naylor took over direction of the series, in addition to writing and producing. Series VI was directed by Andy De Emmony, and Ed Bye returned to direct series VII and VIII. Series I, II and III were made by Paul Jackson Productions, with subsequent series produced by the writers' own company Grant Naylor Productions for BBC North. All eight series were broadcast on BBC Two. For series IV, production moved from BBC North's New Broadcasting House in Manchester to Shepperton.

=== Theme song and music ===
The opening theme tune, closing theme tune, and incidental music were written and performed by Howard Goodall, with the vocals on the closing theme tune by Jenna Russell. The first two series used a relatively sombre instrumental version of the closing theme for the opening titles; from Series III onwards this switched to a more upbeat version, with Goodall singing on vocoder, the line "Red Dwarf" four times in the second half of the song. Goodall also wrote music for the show's various songs, including "Tongue Tied", with lyrics written by Grant and Naylor. Danny John-Jules (credited as "The Cat") re-orchestrated and released "Tongue Tied" on 11 October 1993; it reached number 17 on the UK charts. Goodall himself sang "The Rimmer Song" heard during the Series VII episode "Blue", to which Chris Barrie mimed.

=== Remastered ===
In 1998, on the tenth anniversary of the show's first airing (and between the broadcast of Series VII and VIII), the first three series of Red Dwarf were remastered and released on VHS. The remastering included replacing model shots with computer graphics, cutting certain dialogue and scenes, re-filming Norman Lovett's Holly footage, creating a consistent set of opening titles, replacing music and creating ambient sound effects with a digital master. The remastered series were released in a four-disc DVD box set "The Bodysnatcher Collection" in 2007.

=== Hiatus ===
Release timeline
1988	Series I and II
1989	Series III
1990
1991	Series IV
1992	Series V
1993	Series VI
1994
1995
1996
1997	Series VII
1998
1999	Series VIII
2000
2001
2002
2003
2004
2005
2006
2007
2008
2009	Red Dwarf: Back To Earth
2010
2011
2012	Series X
2013
2014
2015
2016	Series XI
2017	Series XII
2018
2019
2020	Red Dwarf: The Promised Land

Four years elapsed between Series VI and VII, partly due to the dissolving of the Grant and Naylor partnership, but also due to cast and crew working on other projects. When the series eventually returned, it was filmised and no longer shot in front of a live audience, allowing for greater use of four-walled sets, location shooting and single-camera techniques. When the show returned for its eighth series two years later, however, it had dropped use of the filmising process and returned to using a live audience.

The show received a setback when the BBC rejected proposals for a Series IX. Doug Naylor confirmed in 2007 that the BBC decided not to renew the series, as they preferred to work on other projects. A short animated Christmas special was, however, made available to mobile phone subscribers the same year. Ultimately, however, fans had to wait a decade before the series finally returned to television.

=== Red Dwarf: The Movie ===
Since the beginning of the seventh series in 1997, Doug Naylor had been attempting to make a feature-length version of the show. A final draft of the script was written by Naylor, and flyers began circulating around certain websites. The flyer had been created by Winchester Films in order to market the film overseas. Plot details were included as part of a teaser.

The movie was set in the distant future in which Homo sapienoids— a race of cyborgs— had taken over the Solar System and were wiping out the human race. Spaceships that tried to escape Earth were hunted down "until only one remained... Red Dwarf".

Naylor scouted Australia to get an idea of locations and finance costs. Pre-production began in 2004 and filming was planned for 2005. Costumes were made, including Kryten's, and A-list celebrity cameos, including Madonna, were rumoured. However, the team struggled to find sufficient funding. Naylor explained at a Red Dwarf Dimension Jump convention that the film had been rejected by the BBC and the British Film Council.

In 2012, material from early drafts of the film was incorporated into the Series X finale "The Beginning".

In 2018, Naylor suggested production of the movie was still under consideration, explaining: "The order will probably be another TV series, a stage show and possibly a movie, and I think the guys agree on that. The film is a long shot at this point just because it can take so long to get funding."

=== Revival ===
In 2008, a three-episode production was commissioned by the digital channel Dave. Red Dwarf: Back to Earth was broadcast over the Easter weekend of 2009. The story was set nine years after the events of "Only the Good..." and involves the characters arriving back on Earth, circa 2009, only to find that they are characters in a TV show called "Red Dwarf".

The specials were televised over three nights, starting on Friday 10 April 2009. The broadcasts received record ratings for Dave; the first of the three episodes represented the UK's highest-ever viewing figures for a commissioned programme on a digital network.

Back to Earth was followed by three full series for Dave, Red Dwarf X, Red Dwarf XI, and Red Dwarf XII in 2012, 2016 and 2017 respectively; and a feature-length special Red Dwarf: The Promised Land in 2020.

== Future ==
More feature-length specials were to be produced following The Promised Land's release in April 2020. However, immediate plans to make them were delayed due to the COVID-19 pandemic. In 2021, a legal battle between Red Dwarf creators Doug Naylor and Rob Grant over the rights to the franchise further delayed production of the series. The conflict was resolved by March 2023 where they agreed they could each "launch separate iterations of Red Dwarf across various media."

Naylor started work on the script for another feature-length special in 2024, which would have involved Lister and Rimmer traveling through time and meeting earlier versions of themselves. Later in the year UKTV decided to stop commissioning scripted comedy and to not go ahead with this commission. Naylor expressed his hope that the show would be picked up by another network, and that his intent that in the "worst case scenario", he would finish the story as a novel.

Rob Grant announced a pitch for a prequel project titled Red Dwarf: Titan in November 2023, with a new cast portraying younger versions of the main characters, to be written with collaborator Andrew Marshall. In 2026 this was announced as a novel, to be released in July 2026, with Gollancz. Grant died suddenly shortly after the announcement. In a tribute, his editor confirmed that the book was ready and still scheduled for the summer.

== Themes ==
Red Dwarf was founded on the standard sitcom focus of a disparate and frequently dysfunctional group of individuals living together in a restricted setting. With the main characters routinely displaying their cowardice, incompetence and laziness, while exchanging insulting and sarcastic dialogue, the series provided a humorous antidote to the fearless and morally upright space explorers typically found in science-fiction series, with its main characters acting bravely only when there was no other possible alternative. The increasing science-fiction elements of the series were treated seriously by creators Rob Grant and Doug Naylor. Satire, parody and drama were alternately woven into the episodes, referencing other television series, films and books. These have included references to the likes of 2001: A Space Odyssey (1968), Top Gun (1986), RoboCop (1987), Star Wars (1977), Citizen Kane (1942), The Wild One (1953), High Noon (1952), Rebel Without a Cause (1955), Casablanca (1942), Easy Rider (1969), The Terminator (1984), Pride and Prejudice (1813), Isaac Asimov's Robot series (1939–85) and the Four Horsemen of the Apocalypse.

The writers based the whole theme of some episodes on the plots of feature films. The series III episode "Polymorph" references and parodies key moments from Alien (1979); from series IV, "Camille" echoes key scenes from Casablanca (1942), while "Meltdown" borrows the main plot from Westworld (1973). For series IX, "Back to Earth" was partially inspired by Blade Runner (1982). The series' themes are not limited to films or television, having also incorporated historical events and figures. Religion also plays a part in the series, as a significant factor in the ultimate fate of the Cat race, and the perception of Lister as their 'God', both in the episode "Waiting for God" (whose title makes a literary reference to the Samuel Beckett play Waiting for Godot), as well as the crew meeting a man whom they believe to be Jesus Christ in series X episode "Lemons". The series VII episode "Ouroboros" derives its name and theme from the ancient mythological snake of the same name. The third episode of series VI, "Gunmen of the Apocalypse", was based on the Four Horsemen of the Apocalypse.

The series explores many science-fiction staples such as time-travel paradoxes (including the grandfather paradox), the question of determinism and free will (in several episodes), the pursuit of happiness in virtual reality and, crucially to the show's premise of Lister being the last human, the near-certainty of the human species' extinction sometime in the far future.

Grant and Naylor decided very early in the process that they did not want aliens to feature in the series. This is usually addressed with Rimmer's belief in extraterrestrial life being shot down, as with a vessel he believes to be an alien ship (which turns out to be a garbage pod). However, there are non-human life forms such as evolutions of Earth species (e.g. the cat race), robotic or holo-life forms created by humans, and a "genetically engineered life form" (GELF), an artificially created creature. Simulants and GELFs frequently serve as antagonists during the later series of the show.

== Hallmarks ==
The series developed its own distinct vocabulary. Words and phrases such as hologrammatic [sic], dollarpound ($£), bazookoids, Felis sapiens, Simulants, GELF, space weevil, and Zero Gee Football appear throughout the series, highlighting a development in language, political climate, technology, evolution and culture in the future. The creators also employed a vocabulary of fictional expletives to avoid using potentially offensive words in the show and to give nuance to futuristic colloquial language; in particular, "smeg" (and variants such as "smegging", "smegger", and "smeg-head") features prominently, alongside the terms "gimboid", "goit" and "Gwenlan".

== Episodes ==
Series	Episodes	Originally released		
Series	Episodes	First released	Last released	Network
I	6	15 February 1988	21 March 1988	BBC2
II	6	6 September 1988	11 October 1988	BBC2
III	6	14 November 1989	19 December 1989	BBC2
IV	6	14 February 1991	21 March 1991	BBC2
V	6	20 February 1992	26 March 1992	BBC2
VI	6	7 October 1993	11 November 1993	BBC2
VII	8	17 January 1997	7 March 1997	BBC2
VIII	8	18 February 1999	5 April 1999	BBC Two
Back to Earth	3	10 April 2009	12 April 2009	Dave
X	6	4 October 2012	8 November 2012	Dave
XI	6	22 September 2016	27 October 2016	Dave
XII	6	12 October 2017	16 November 2017	Dave
The Promised Land		9 April 2020		Dave

== Reception and achievements ==
=== Critical reception ===
The changes made to the series' cast, setting, creative teams and even production values from series to series have meant that opinions differ greatly between fans and critics as to the quality of each series. In the "Great Red Dwarf Debate," published in Volume 2, Issue 3 of the Red Dwarf Smegazine, science fiction writers Steve Lyons and Joe Nazarro argue about the pros and cons of the early series versus the later series. Lyons states what the show "once had was a unique balance of sci-fi comedy, which worked magnificently." Nazarro agrees that "the first two series are very original and very funny," but goes on to say that "it wasn't until series III that the show hit its stride." Discussions revolve around the quality of Series VI, seen by one reviewer as just as good as the earlier series', but criticised by another reviewer as a descent into formulaic comedy with an unwelcome change of setting.

The changes seen in Series VII disappointed some; while much slicker and higher-budget in appearance, the shift away from outright sitcom and into something approaching comedy drama was seen by one reviewer as a move in the wrong direction. The attempt to shift back into traditional sitcom format for Series VIII was greeted with a response that was similarly lukewarm. There was criticism aimed at the decision to resurrect the entire crew of Red Dwarf, as it was felt this detracted from the series' central premise of Lister being the last human being alive. There are other critics who feel that Series VII and VIII are no weaker than the earlier series, however, and the topic is the subject of constant fervent debate among the show's fanbase.

=== Achievements ===
Although the pilot episode of the show gathered over four million viewers, viewing figures dipped in successive episodes and the first series had generally poor ratings. Through to Series VI, ratings steadily increased and peaked at over six million viewers, achieved with the episode "Gunmen of the Apocalypse." When the show returned in 1999, it gained the highest audience figures yet; over eight million viewers tuned in for Series VIII's opening episode "Back in the Red: Part I". The show has won numerous awards including the Royal Television Society Award for special effects, the British Science Fiction award for Best Dramatic Presentation, as well as an International Emmy Award for Series VI episode "Gunmen of the Apocalypse", which tied with an Absolutely Fabulous episode, "Hospital," in the Popular Arts category. The show had also been nominated for the International Emmy Award in 1987, 1989 and 1992. Series VI won a British Comedy Award for 'Best BBC Comedy Series.' The video sales have won eight Gold Awards from the British Video Association, and the show still holds the record for being BBC Two's longest-running, highest-rated sitcom.

During 2005 SFX surveyed readers' top 50 British telefantasy shows of all time, and Red Dwarf placed second ahead of The Hitchhiker's Guide to the Galaxy and behind Doctor Who. In 2007, the series was voted 'Best Sci-Fi Show Of All Time' by the readers of Radio Times magazine. Editor Gill Hudson stated that this result surprised them as 'the series had not given any new episodes this century'. Entertainment Weekly listed it in a 2009 roundup of shows they missed in their list of best cult television series. In January 2017, Series XI was voted "Best Returning TV Sitcom" and "Comedy of the Year" for 2016 by readers for the British Comedy Guide. A year later, Red Dwarf was once again voted "Best Returning TV Sitcom" for Series XII, retaining the title from British Comedy Guide. As noted by Collider in 2023, it ranked number four among the top ten British science fiction shows on IMDb. In 2024, it was listed by Den of Geek as among the best British science fiction shows of the 1980s, as well as among the top ten movies and shows inspired by Star Trek. It was listed at 90 on Empire's "The 100 Best TV Shows Of All Time" ranking.

== Spin-offs and merchandise ==
The show's logo and characters have appeared on a wide range of merchandise. Red Dwarf has also been spun off in a variety of different media formats. For instance, the song "Tongue Tied," featured in the "Parallel Universe" episode of the show, was released in 1993 as a single and became a top 20 UK hit for Danny John-Jules (under the name "The Cat"). Stage plays of the show have been produced by Blak Yak, a theatre group in Perth, Western Australia, who were given permission by Grant Naylor Productions to mount stage versions of certain episodes in 2002, 2004 and 2006. In October 2006, an Interactive Quiz DVD entitled Red Dwarf: Beat The Geek was released, hosted by Norman Lovett and Hattie Hayridge, both reprising their roles as Holly. In 2005, Grant Naylor Productions and Studio Hubris, in conjunction with Across the Pond Comics, collaborated to produce the spin-off webcomic Red Dwarf: Prelude to Nanarchy.

=== Novels ===
Working together under the name "Grant Naylor", the creators of the series collaboratively wrote two novels. The first, Infinity Welcomes Careful Drivers, was published in November 1989, and it incorporates plot lines from several episodes of the show's first two series. The second novel, Better Than Life, followed in October 1990, and it is largely based on the second-series episode of the same name. Together, the two novels provide expanded backstory and development of the series' principal characters and themes.

The authors began work on a sequel to Better than Life, called The Last Human, but Rob Grant was drawn away from Red Dwarf by an interest in other projects. Grant and Naylor ultimately ended up writing two different sequels, each presenting a possible version of the story's continuation. Last Human, by Doug Naylor, adds Kochanski to the crew and places more emphasis on the science-fiction and plot elements, while Rob Grant's novel Backwards, is more in keeping with the previous two novels, and borrows more extensively from established television stories.

An omnibus edition of the first two novels was released in 1992, including edits to the original text and extra material such as the original pilot script of the TV series. All four novels have been released in audiobook format, the first two read by Chris Barrie, Last Human read by Craig Charles, and Backwards read by author Rob Grant.

In December 2009, Infinity Welcomes Careful Drivers was released in Germany with the title Roter Zwerg ("Red Dwarf" in German).

A new prequel novel Red Dwarf: Titan written by Rob Grant and Andrew Marshall was released by Gollancz on 16 July 2026. Grant explained that "It's Lister and Rimmer before the accident on shore leave on Titan. It's set one universe to the side, so we can have familiar characters but we can do different things with them, because the difficulty was writing something that was going to be original and fresh and using the same characters without breaking the canon."

==== List of Red Dwarf novels ====
Title	Release date	Author(s)
Infinity Welcomes Careful Drivers	2 November 1989	"Grant Naylor" (Rob Grant and Doug Naylor)
Better Than Life	25 October 1990	"Grant Naylor" (Rob Grant and Doug Naylor)
Last Human	27 April 1995	Doug Naylor
Backwards	5 February 1996	Rob Grant
Titan	16 July 2026	Rob Grant and Andrew Marshall

=== Home video releases ===
The first eight series of Red Dwarf were released on VHS, but not in the order of the show as broadcast. Series III was released on home video in 1991, followed by Series II and Series IV in 1992. Series I was released on VHS in 1993; at the time, that series had not been repeated on television since its original broadcast in 1988. Series V was released on video in 1994, followed by Series VI in 1995, Series VII in 1997 and Series VIII in 1999.

For the initial release of the VHS editions, episodes of Red Dwarf were separated and two volumes released for each series (except Series VII and VIII, which were released on three separate tapes), labelled 'Byte One' and 'Byte Two' (plus 'Byte Three' for series VII and VIII, although in Australia, Series VII and VIII were released in two volumes each, with four episodes per tape). These videos were named after the first episode of the three presented on the tape, as was typical with other BBC video releases at the time. However, on occasions the BBC decided to ignore the original running order and use the most popular episodes from the show to maximise sales of the videos: for Series III (the first-ever release), "Bodyswap" and "Timeslides" were swapped round, so that the latter could receive top billing on the second VHS volume; for the second VHS volume of Series I, "Confidence and Paranoia" was given top billing, even though the original broadcast order was retained; this was due to the leading episode being "Waiting for God" which shared its name with the title of another comedy series (set in a retirement home); and for Series V, "Back to Reality" and "Quarantine" were given top billing on their respective video release, which completely re-organised the order of episodes from that in which they were originally broadcast. Future releases would increasingly observe authenticity with the 'original broadcast' context, although Byte Two of Red Dwarf VI was titled "Polymorph II: Emohawk" despite the lead-off episode's actual title of "Emohawk: Polymorph II."

"Future Echoes", "Queeg", "Polymorph", "Dimension Jump", "Back to Reality" and "Gunmen of the Apocalypse" were additionally available in a two video box set titled Six of the Best. This also included a holographic sticker of Starbug and a CD interviewing Rob Grant, Doug Naylor, and Ed Bye. Three episodes of Series VII were also released as special "Xtended" [sic] versions with extra scenes (including an original, unbroadcast ending for the episode "Tikka To Ride") and no laugh track; the remastered versions of Series I–III were also released individually and in a complete box-set. Finally, two outtake videos were released, both hosted by Robert Llewellyn in character as Kryten: Smeg Ups in 1994, and its sequel, Smeg Outs, in 1995.

Release	Episodes	Year	Dist. and Cat. #
Red Dwarf I – Byte One – The End	"The End" • "Future Echoes" • "Balance of Power"	5 April 1993, and 7 June 1993	BBCV 4943/BBCV 4982
Red Dwarf I – Byte Two – Confidence & Paranoia	"Confidence and Paranoia • "Waiting for God" • "Me²"	7 June 1993	BBCV 4983
Red Dwarf II – Byte One – Kryten	"Kryten" • "Better Than Life" • "Thanks for the Memory"	2 March 1992	CBS/Fox 5969 BBCV 4749
Red Dwarf II – Byte Two – Stasis Leak	"Stasis Leak" • "Queeg" • "Parallel Universe"	2 March 1992	CBS/Fox 5970 BBCV 4750
Red Dwarf III – Byte One – Backwards	"Backwards" • "Marooned" • "Polymorph"	7 October 1991	CBS/Fox 5876 BBCV 4695
Red Dwarf III – Byte Two – Timeslides	"Timeslides" • "Body Swap" • "The Last Day"	4 November 1991	CBS/Fox 5877 BBCV 4707
Red Dwarf IV – Byte One – Camille	"Camille" • "DNA" • "Justice"	5 October 1992	CBS/Fox 5874 BBCV 4876
Red Dwarf IV – Byte Two – Dimension Jump	"White Hole" • "Dimension Jump" • "Meltdown"	5 October 1992	CBS/Fox 5875 BBCV 4877
Red Dwarf V – Byte One – Back To Reality	"Back To Reality" • "Demons & Angels" • "Holoship"	4 July 1994	CBS/Fox 8262 BBCV 5197
Red Dwarf V – Byte Two – Quarantine	"Quarantine" • "The Inquisitor" • "Terrorform"	1 August 1994	CBS/Fox 8263 BBCV 5212
Red Dwarf VI – Byte One – Gunmen of the Apocalypse	"Psirens" • "Legion" • "Gunmen of the Apocalypse"	1 May 1995	CBS/Fox 3196 BBCV 5580
Red Dwarf VI – Byte Two – Polymorph II – Emohawk	"Polymorph II – Emohawk" • "Rimmerworld" • "Out of Time"	1 May 1995	CBS/Fox 3376 BBCV 5581
Red Dwarf VII – Byte One	"Tikka to Ride" • "Stoke Me a Clipper" • Ouroboros	1 March 1999	CBS/Fox 6452 BBCV 6789
Red Dwarf VII – Byte Two	"Duct Soup" • "Blue" • Beyond a Joke	1 March 1999	BBCV 6790
Red Dwarf VII – Byte Three	"Epideme" • "Nanarchy"	1 March 1999	BBCV 6791
Red Dwarf VII – Xtended	Tikka to Ride • "Ouroboros" • "Duct Soup" • Smeg Ups	3 November 1997	BBCV 6285
Red Dwarf VIII – Byte One – Back in the Red	"Back in the Red" – Part 1, 2, & 3	4 October 1999	CBS/Fox 14608 BBCV 6842
Red Dwarf VIII – Byte Two – Cassandra	"Cassandra" • "Krytie TV" • "Pete" – Part 1	4 October 1999	CBS/Fox 14609 BBCV 6843
Red Dwarf VIII – Byte Three – Pete, Part 2	"Pete" – Part 2 • "Only the Good..."	4 October 1999	CBS/Fox 14626
Red Dwarf – Smeg Ups	The outtakes from Series IV, V & VI	7 November 1994	CBS/Fox 8375 BBCV 5406
Red Dwarf – Smeg Outs	The outtakes from Series I, II & III	6 November 1995	CBS/Fox 8475 BBCV 5693
Red Dwarf – Six of the Best	"Future Echoes" • "Queeg" • "Polymorph" • "Dimension Jump" • "Back to Reality" • "Gunmen of the Apocalypse"	3 February 1997	BBCV 6171

==== DVD releases ====
The first eight series have been released on DVD in Regions 1, 2 and 4, each with a bonus disc of extra material. Each release from Series III onwards also features an original documentary about the making of each respective series. Regions 2 and 4 have also seen the release of two Just the Shows, digipack box sets containing the episodes from Series I–IV (Volume 1) and V–VIII (Volume 2) with static menus and no extras. Red Dwarf: The Bodysnatcher Collection, containing the 1998 remastered episodes, as well as new documentaries for series I and II, was released in 2007. This release showcased a storyboard construction of "Bodysnatcher", an unfinished script from 1987, which was finally completed in 2007 by Rob Grant and Doug Naylor who were working together for the first time since 1993. In December 2008 an anniversary DVD set entitled Red Dwarf: All the Shows was released, reworking the vanilla disc content of the two Just the Shows sets within A4 packaging resembling a photo album, which omitted information that no extras were included. This box set was re-released in a smaller slipcase-sized box, reverting to the Just the Shows title, in November 2009. The show is also available for download on iTunes.

Release	# of discs	DVD release date		
Release	# of discs	Region 1	Region 2	Region 4
Series I	2	25 February 2003	4 November 2002	3 December 2002
Series II	2	25 February 2003	10 February 2003	1 April 2003
Series III	2	3 February 2004	3 November 2003	18 November 2003
Series IV	2	3 February 2004	16 February 2004	9 March 2004
Just the Shows Vol. 1 Series 1–4 with no extras	4	—N/a	18 October 2004	12 November 2004
Series V	2	15 March 2005	8 November 2004	1 December 2004
Series VI	2	15 March 2005	21 February 2005	6 April 2005
Series VII	3	10 January 2006	7 November 2005	1 December 2005
Series VIII	3	2 May 2006	27 March 2006	20 April 2006
The Complete Collection; Series 1–8 with extras	18	5 September 2006	—N/a	—N/a
Just the Shows Vol. 2 Series 5–8 with no extras	6	—N/a	2 October 2006	3 November 2006
Beat the Geek (Interactive DVD quiz game)	1	—N/a	23 October 2006	3 March 2011
The Bodysnatcher Collection; The remastered versions of series 1–3	4	—N/a	12 November 2007	7 May 2008
Just the Smegs; DVD re-issue of the VHS release Smeg Ups and Smeg Outs	1	—N/a	19 November 2007	3 March 2011
All the Shows; Series 1–8 with no extras	10	—N/a	10 November 2008	—N/a
Back to Earth	2	6 October 2009	15 June 2009	17 December 2009
Just the Shows; Series 1–8 with no extras	10	—N/a	9 November 2009	—N/a
The Complete Collection; Series 1–3 (Remastered), series 4–8, Just the Smegs and Back to Earth – The Director's Cut	19	—N/a	—N/a	4 August 2010
Series X	2	8 January 2013	19 November 2012	12 December 2012
Series XI	2	8 November 2016	14 November 2016	8 March 2017
Series XII	2	21 November 2017	20 November 2017	18 February 2018
The Promised Land	1	15 September 2020	1 June 2020	—N/a

==== Blu-ray releases ====
Release	# of discs	Blu-ray release date	
Release	# of discs	Region A	Region B
Series I–VIII; With The Bodysnatcher Collection	19	2 August 2019^{a}	14 January 2019^{b}
Back to Earth	2	6 October 2009	31 August 2009
Series X	2	8 January 2013	19 November 2012
Series XI	2	8 November 2016	14 November 2016
Series XII	2	21 November 2017	20 November 2017
The Promised Land	1	15 September 2020	1 June 2020
Complete Series I–XIII; With Just the Smegs and The Bodysnatcher Collection	33	—N/a	6 October 2025

^a Only in Japan
^b Only in the United Kingdom

In 2016, BBC Worldwide began creating an 'up-resed' version of the first five series for release on Blu-ray, due to demand from Japan. When asked about the project in 2017, Naylor confirmed he had stopped it due to lackluster picture quality. By 2018, the project, now encompassing the entire original run, had been restarted, and a Series 1–8 Blu-ray set release was confirmed in August.

=== Magazine ===
The Red Dwarf Magazine—the magazine part of the title changed to "Smegazine" from Issue 3— was launched in 1992 by Fleetway Editions. It ran for 23 issues, Volume 1 from Issues 1 through 14 and Volume 2 from Issues 1 – 9. It comprised a mix of news, reviews, interviews, comic strips, and competitions. The comic strips featured episode adaptations and original material, including further stories of popular characters like Mr. Flibble, the Polymorph and Ace Rimmer.

Notably, the comic strip stories' holographic characters, predominately Rimmer, were drawn in greyscale. This was at the request of Grant and Naylor, who had wanted to but, for financial reason, were unable to use the technique for the television series (Rimmer did appear in greyscale in "low power mode" in "The Promised Land").

Despite achieving circulation figures of over 40,000 per month, the magazine's publisher decided to close the title down to concentrate on their other publications. A farewell issue was published in January 1994, featuring remaining interviews, features, and comic strips that had been planned for the following issues.

The Official Red Dwarf Fan Club produces a periodical magazine for members titled Back to Reality. The previous volume of this magazine, dating back to the 1990s, was known as Better Than Life.

=== American version ===
Cast of second Red Dwarf USA pilot

Despite the original version having been broadcast on PBS, a pilot episode for an American version (known as Red Dwarf USA) was produced through Universal Studios with the intention of broadcasting on NBC in 1992. The show essentially followed the same story as the first episode of the original series, using American actors for most of the main roles: Craig Bierko as Lister, Chris Eigeman as Rimmer and Hinton Battle as Cat. Exceptions to this were Llewellyn, who reprised his role as Kryten, and the British actress Jane Leeves, who played Holly. It was written by Linwood Boomer and directed by Jeffrey Melman, with Grant and Naylor on board as creators and executive producers. Llewellyn, Grant and Naylor travelled to America for the filming of the American pilot after production of the fifth series of the British version. According to Llewellyn and Naylor, the cast were not satisfied with Linwood Boomer's script. Grant and Naylor rewrote the script, but although the cast preferred the re-write, the script as filmed was closer to Boomer's version. The pilot episode includes footage from the British version in its title sequence, although it did not retain the logo or the theme music of the British version. During filming of the pilot, the audience reaction was good, and it was felt that the story had been well received.

The studio executives were not entirely happy with the pilot, especially the casting, but decided to give the project another chance with Grant and Naylor in charge. The intention was to shoot a "promo video" for the show in a small studio described by the writers as "a garage". New cast members were hired for the roles of Cat (now depicted as female) and Rimmer, Terry Farrell and Anthony Fusco, respectively. This meant that, unlike the original British show, the cast were all Caucasian, which Charles referred to as "White Dwarf". Chris Barrie was asked to play Rimmer in the second pilot, but he declined. With a small budget and deadline, new scenes were quickly shot and mixed in with existing footage of the pilot and UK Series V episodes, to give an idea of the basic plot and character dynamics, alongside proposed future episodes, remakes of episodes from the original show. Llewellyn did not participate in the re-shoot, though clips from the British version were used to show the character. Despite the re-shoots and re-casting, the option on the pilot was not picked up.

The cast of both the British and American versions criticised the casting of Red Dwarf USA, particularly the part of Lister, who is portrayed in the British version as a likeable slob, but in the American version as somewhat clean-cut. In the 2004 documentary Dwarfing USA, Danny John-Jules said the only actor who could have successfully portrayed an American Lister was John Belushi. In a 2009 interview on Kevin Pollak's Chat Show, Bierko said that it was a "huge mistake" for him to play Lister, and also said that a "John Belushi-type" would have been better suited to the role.

The American pilot has been heavily bootlegged, but it has never been broadcast on TV in any country. Excerpts from the first pilot are included in Dwarfing USA, a featurette on the making of the pilots included on the DVD release of Red Dwarf's fifth series. Because of rights-clearance issues, no footage from the second pilot is included in the featurette.

Character	British series	1st American pilot	2nd American pilot
Dave Lister	Craig Charles	Craig Bierko	Craig Bierko
Arnold Rimmer	Chris Barrie	Chris Eigeman	Anthony Fusco
Cat	Danny John-Jules	Hinton Battle	Terry Farrell
Kryten	David Ross (series 2); Robert Llewellyn (series 3–)	Robert Llewellyn	Robert Llewellyn
Holly	Norman Lovett (series 1–2, 7–8, 12–13); Hattie Hayridge (series 3–5)	Jane Leeves	Jane Leeves

=== Role-playing game ===
Deep7 Press (formerly Deep7 LLC) released Red Dwarf – The Roleplaying Game in February 2003 (the printed copyright is 2002). Based on the series, the game allows its players to portray original characters within the Red Dwarf universe. Player characters can be human survivors, holograms, "evolved" house pets (cats, dogs, iguanas, rabbits, rats and mice), various types of mechanoid (Series 4000, Hudzen 10 and Waxdroids in the corebook, Series 3000 in the Extra Bits Book) or GELFs (Kinatawowi and Pleasure GELF in the corebook, "Vindaloovians" in the Extra Bits Book).

=== Video games ===
On June 23, 2003 a shooting game called Simulant's Revenge was released by Blue Beck for J2ME powered mobile phones. In promotion of the upcoming release of Series XI, a mobile game titled Red Dwarf XI – The Game was released to coincide with the release of "Twentica" on 22 September 2016. Developed by GameDigits, it was intended to release episodically with new releases being based on all the episodes of XI. However, it ceased development following the end of its adaptation of Officer Rimmer to instead focus on developing Red Dwarf XII – The Game, which dropped the episodic format and instead featured minigames such as running through the corridors of spaceships featured in XII, similar to Temple Run, and free-roaming space on board Starbug. Fan reception to the games were mixed and, by late 2019, both games were no longer available to download from Google Play; however, Red Dwarf XII – The Game can still be downloaded from Amazon App Store, as well as Google Play when linked to via the URL.

Red Dwarf was featured as a hidden area in the Lego video game, Lego Dimensions. The area was featured in the game's Fantastic Beasts and Where to Find Them expansion pack released on 18 November 2016, where the player was able to explore a small section of the titular ship including the sleeping quarters. References to the most recent series of the show were also included such as Snacky from Give & Take making a non-speaking appearance and the bio-printer from Officer Rimmer being an interactable object. On October 23, 2024 Andy Davidson, the original creator of Worms, highlighted a custom level based on Red Dwarf as part of the run up to the release of Worms: The Director's Cut 1.5.

=== Red Dwarf Night ===
On 14 February 1998, the night before the tenth anniversary of the show's first episode broadcast, BBC Two devoted an evening of programmes to the series, under the banner of Red Dwarf Night. The evening consisted of a mixture of new and existing material, and it was introduced and linked by actor and fan Patrick Stewart. In addition, a series of special take-offs on BBC Two's idents, featuring the "2" logo falling in love with a skutter, were used. The night began with Can't Smeg, Won't Smeg, a spoof of the cookery programme Can't Cook, Won't Cook, presented by that show's host Ainsley Harriott, who had himself appeared as a GELF in the Series VI episode "Emohawk: Polymorph II". Taking place outside the continuity of the show, two teams (Kryten and Lister versus Rimmer and Cat, although Cat quickly departs to be replaced by alter ego Duane Dibbley) were challenged to make the best chicken vindaloo.

After a compilation bloopers show, featuring out-takes, the next programme was Universe Challenge, a spoof of University Challenge. Hosted by original University Challenge presenter Bamber Gascoigne, the show had a team of knowledgeable Dwarf fans compete against a team consisting of Chris Barrie, Craig Charles, Robert Llewellyn, Chloë Annett and Danny John-Jules. This was followed by The Red Dwarf A–Z, a half-hour documentary that chose a different aspect of the show to focus on for each letter of the alphabet. Talking heads on the episode included Stephen Hawking, Terry Pratchett, original producer Paul Jackson, Mr Blobby, Patrick Stewart and a Dalek. Finally, the night ended with a showing of the episode "Gunmen of the Apocalypse".

=== YouTube Geek Week ===
In August 2013, YouTube held a campaign to promote user-generated content concerning science fiction, comics, gaming and science. Robert Llewellyn in-character as Kryten hosted the event's daily videos, making references to Lister, Rimmer and the Cat whilst presenting featured uploads.

=== Stellar Rescue ===
On 1 July 2019, an advert for the AA called "Stellar Rescue" featuring the core Red Dwarf crew premiered on ITV. The advert has Starbug break down on an inhospitable planet with Lister using the AA app to call a mechanic and successfully escape. On 2 March 2020, a second advert called "Stellar Rescue – Smart Breakdown" was uploaded to the AA official YouTube channel featuring Starbug stranded without power on an ice planet but with Lister again calling a mechanic and saving the day. An alternate 30-second one accompanied it, with this one serving as the broadcast version.

=== Red Dwarf: The First Three Million Years ===
In August 2020, a three-part documentary series entitled The First Three Million Years aired on Dave and narrated by Doctor Who actor David Tennant. The retrospective contained deleted scenes, behind-the-scenes footage and new interviews, as the cast and crew reflecting upon 30 years of the show. A conversation between the four key cast members was filmed on the set of "The Promised Land", as the actors shared memories and anecdotes from their decades of working together.

The first episode attracted 369,000 viewers overnight, which was the second-highest figure for a new programme on Dave that year.

== See also ==
- British sitcom
- List of science fiction sitcoms
