= Carrott's Lib =

British TV series

- Created by: Jasper Carrott
- Starring: Jasper Carrott; Nick Wilton
- Country of origin: United Kingdom
- Original language: English
- No. of series: 2
- No. of episodes: 15 (inc. 2 specials)

Production
- Producer: Geoff Posner
- Running time: 40 minutes

Original release
- Network: BBC1
- Release: 2 October 1982 – 30 December 1983

Carrott's Lib is a British satirical comedy series broadcast between 2 October 1982 and 30 December 1983. It starred Jasper Carrott and a cast of many comedians. The show was a satirical comedy and sketch show, featuring many comedians who went on to become famous in their own right, notably Chris Barrie (Red Dwarf, The Brittas Empire) and Jan Ravens (Dead Ringers, Spitting Image). It was broadcast live from Shepherd's Bush on Saturday nights, albeit with some pre-recorded elements.

== Transmissions ==
Series	Episodes	Originally released	
Series	Episodes	First released	Last released
1	7	2 October 1982	13 November 1982
Election special		9 June 1983	
2	8	22 October 1983	10 December 1983
Christmas special		30 December 1983	
