= Paul Alexander (British writer) =

British comedy writer

- Born: United Kingdom
- Occupations: Comedy writer, screenwriter
- Writing career
- Language: English
- Genres: Comedy, television, film, stage
- Notable works: My Hero, Red Dwarf, The 10%ers, Staggered, Seeing Double, The Smallest Show on Earth (stage musical)

Paul Alexander is a British comedy writer. He has written or contributed to My Hero, Red Dwarf, The 10%ers, My Spy Family, Babes in the Wood, Lovejoy, Horrid Henry, Bedsitcom, Goodnight Sweetheart, The Green Green Grass, My Parents Are Aliens, 2point4 Children, Neighbors from Hell, Summer in Transylvania and Emmerdale.

His screenplays include Staggered and Seeing Double.

For radio he cowrote four series of Kim Fuller's medieval sitcom The Castle, 2007–2012.

He wrote the book for the stage musical The Smallest Show on Earth.
