= Ed Bye =

British film & TV producer and director

- Born: Edward Richard Morrison Bye; June 1955 (age 71)
- Education: Mount House School; Ravensbourne College, London
- Occupations: Television and film director Television and film producer
- Spouse: Ruby Wax (m. 1988)
- Children: 3

Edward Richard Morrison Bye is a British film and TV producer and director. He directed the episodes of the science-fiction sitcom Red Dwarf from series I to IV and VII to VIII.

== Early life ==
Ed Bye is the son of Royal Marine Colonel Francis Clifford Edward Bye, OBE, of Great Bedwyn, Wiltshire, and Twickenham, He later attended Ravensbourne College, London. His older sister born circa 1954, Julia Margery Morrison Bye, died in an accident on 6 May 2009, near her home in Bedwyn Wiltshire.

== Career ==
In 2011, he co-founded the production company Tall TV with Tim Dawson and Susan Nickson.

== Personal life ==
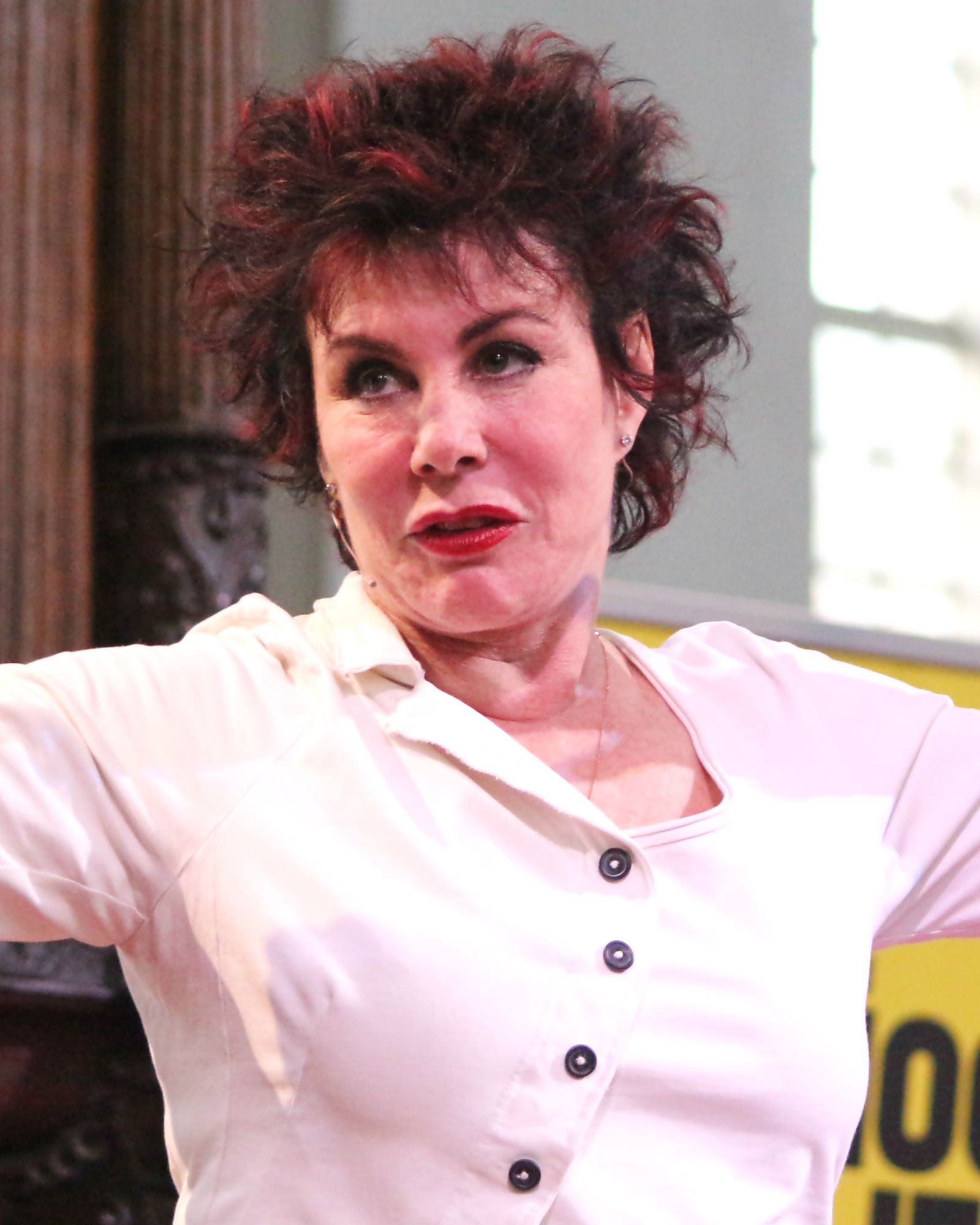
Bye is married to comedian and actress Ruby Wax.

He married comedian and actress Ruby Wax in the former Richmond Registry Office in 1988, their first child Max, was born the same year, and their two daughters Madeline and Marina followed in 1990 and 1993, both sisters perform in the award winning comedy duo, Siblings.

Bye's sister, Julia, died in an accident in 2009, she was married to the 6th Lord Garvagh, and had three children.

== Filmography ==
Title	Year(s)	Role(s)	Notes
The Little and Large Show	1980–1981	Assistant floor manager	
The Two Ronnies	1980–1982	Production team	
Three of a Kind	1981	Production team	
By the Sea	1982	Production team	
The Young Ones	1982–1984	Production team	
Girls on Top	1985–1986	Director	Series 2
Filthy Rich & Catflap	1987	Director	Co-directed with Paul Jackson
Red Dwarf	1988–1991; 1997–1999	Director	Series I–IV and VII–VIII
Craig Goes Mad in Melbourne	1988	Director, producer	Mini-series
Canned Carrott	1990–1992	Director, producer	
The Full Wax	1991–1993	Director, producer	
Bottom	1991–1992	Director, producer	Series 1 and 2
The 10%ers	1993	Director, producer	
Mama's Back!	1993	Director	
The Detectives	1993–1997	Director, producer	
Jasper Carrott: Carrott U Like	1994	Director, producer	TV special
Red Dwarf: Smeg Outs	1995	Director, producer	Outtakes video
Jack and Jeremy's Police 4	1995	Director	
How To Be A Little Sod	1995	Executive producer	
Jack and Jeremy's Real Lives	1996	Script supervisor	
Eddie Izzard: Definite Article	1996	Director	Stand-up special
Ruby	1997–2000	Director	
Bottom Live 3: Hooligan's Island	1997	Director	
Red Dwarf: A-Z	1998	Director, producer	TV special
Can't Cook, Won't Cook	1998	Director, producer	TV special
Kevin & Perry Go Large	2000	Director	Feature film
French & Saunders Live	2000	Director	Stand-up special
Lenny Henry in Pieces	2001; 2002	Director, producer	TV special and TV series
French & Saunders: The Egg	2002	Director	TV special
French & Saunders: Celebrity Christmas Puddings	2002	Director	TV special
Celeb	2002	Director, producer	
Fat Slags	2004	Director	Feature film
Absolutely Fabulous	2004	Director	"White Box" special
Foley & McColl: This Way Up	2005	Director	TV pilot episode
Home Again	2006	Director	
The Vicar of Dibley	2007	Director	"A Wholly Holy Happy Ending"
After You've Gone	2007	Director	Christmas special
My Family	2009–2011	Director	2009 Christmas special and series 10
Round Ireland with a Fridge	2010	Director	Feature film
Coming of Age	2011	Director	Series 3
Not Going Out	2013	Director	Christmas special
Vicious	2013–2015	Director	
Death on the Tyne	2018	Director	TV special
Dial M for Middlesbrough	2019	Director	TV special
Murder, They Hope	2021–2023	Director	
Bottom: Exposed	2024	Actor	TV documentary
Apocalypse Slough	2024	Director	
