= List of Red Dwarf characters =

This is a list of characters from the TV sitcom Red Dwarf.

== Major characters ==
=== Overview ===
Main cast of Red Dwarf
Character	Actor	Seasons												
Character	Actor	I	II	III	IV	V	VI	VII	VIII	IX ^{n}	X	XI	XII	XIII ^{n}
Arnold Rimmer	Chris Barrie	Main	Main	Main	Main	Main	Main	Recurring	Main	Main	Main	Main	Main	Main
Dave Lister	Craig Charles	Main	Main	Main	Main	Main	Main	Main	Main	Main	Main	Main	Main	Main
The Cat	Danny John-Jules	Main	Main	Main	Main	Main	Main	Main	Main	Main	Main	Main	Main	Main
Kryten	David Ross		Guest											
Kryten	Robert Llewellyn			Main	Main	Main	Main	Main	Main	Main	Main	Main	Main	Main
Holly	Norman Lovett	Main	Main					Guest	Main				Guest	Main
Holly	Hattie Hayridge			Main	Main	Main								
Kristine Kochanski	C.P. Grogan	Recurring	Recurring				Guest							
Kristine Kochanski	Chloë Annett							Main	Main	Guest				
Captain Hollister	Mac McDonald	Recurring	Recurring						Main				Guest	

^n Season IX is officially titled "Back to Earth", with the numbering being retconned later. ^n Season XIII is officially titled "The Promised Land".

=== Details ===
Character	Actor	Series
Arnold Rimmer	Chris Barrie	Main: I–VI & VIII–XIII; Recurring: VII
Arnold Judas Rimmer (BSC & SSC) is Lister's bunkmate brought back to life as a hologram (his character wore an "H" symbol on his forehead, which stands for "Hologram") to keep Lister sane. He is unpopular with his crew mates, and is often the target of insults and pranks. Prior to his death, Rimmer was the ship's second technician, which makes him the second-lowest ranking crew member. He retains the rank, even though being a hologram makes him physically incapable of fulfilling his duties. He is technically the highest-ranking member of the crew for much of the shows' run, so he appoints himself as the interim captain. He is only respected as such by Holly and Kryten, although begrudgingly. He is petty, jealous and often dim-witted. Because he is a hologram, he cannot leave the ship unless someone else is carrying a portable device made by Kryten. Also, he is a "non-essential resource", so if the ship runs low on power or Lister dies, Rimmer will be shut down. In season 6, Legion ("Legion"–S6E2) upgrades Rimmer's hardware to 'Hard Light', making Rimmer immortal and indestructible, and also allowing him to touch and feel things. In the middle of Series VII, a chance encounter with an old acquaintance leads him to temporarily depart the crew to do something meaningful with his existence ("Stoke Me a Clipper"–S7E2). This Rimmer hologram is not seen again until "Back to Earth"—other than in a dream ("Blue", S7E5)—but a non-hologram Rimmer is part of the resurrected crew in Series VIII. From "Back to Earth" onwards, the original hologram Rimmer has re-joined the crew, with no explanation as to what happened to the human Rimmer from series VIII. He has had a poor relationship with practically everyone he has ever known, especially his own father. Even he finds himself unbearable when he encounters an alter ego or a hologram of himself. It is implied that Rimmer caused the original catastrophe due to his shoddy maintenance work, a suspicion he himself harbours. In early episodes, he claims to not believe in God or religion due to his upbringing in an unusual denomination. In later episodes, he proves that he is rather open-minded about theology and philosophy.
Dave Lister	Craig Charles	I–XIII
Dave Lister is the last human male in the known universe due to an accident leading to him being kept in stasis for three million years. His best clothes have only two curry stains down the front—and he wrongly believes himself to be a fantastic guitarist. As a technician, third class, he is also the lowest ranking member of the crew. He is obsessed with former crewmate Kristine Kochanski. He makes returning to earth or reuniting with Kochanski his two main goals. He mainly eats Indian food and drinks lager, and often considers a lack of either as a "crisis situation". Lister long claims to have never known his father. Lister is put in stasis for 18 months as punishment for bringing a cat on board the ship. He is woken three million years later, long after all other humans have died out. He sees "future echoes" ("Future Echoes"–S1, E2) which confirm that he will have at least 2 sons (Jim and Bexley) and will live to at least 175. He also learns that Cat's species believed him to be their god 'Cloister' ("Waiting for God"–S1, E4), but Cat never makes this connection. He later becomes pregnant after having intercourse with his female alter ego in another dimension ("Parallel Universe"–S2, E6). Lister discovers that he is his own father in a 'failsafe' that prevents the universe from ending ("Orobouros"–S7, E3). A wormhole shows Lister an alternative timeline in which Kochanski survived the accident and he is the Hologram and Kochanski's husband. Kochanski gets stuck in their timeline, but she and Lister never properly get together. He also loses his arm when he is infected by a virus ("Epideme"/"Nanarchy"–S7, E7-8), but this is restored with the Red Dwarf ship by Kryten's nanobots. In series IX, he is the last human again, but the ship believes he is two people (himself and his own son). Lister realises how close he came to winning Kochanski and becomes even more determined to get her back. While he is normally sarcastic and lazy, he can be self-sacrificing and intelligent when someone's life is in danger.
The Cat	Danny John-Jules	I–XIII
The character has no name besides "The Cat". He is the humanoid descendant of a modern house cat called Frankenstein, who had been Lister's pet cat. The cat society (Felis sapiens) left Red Dwarf seeking the promised land ("Waiting for God"–S1, E4), leaving behind those who were too ill or old to travel. The Cat is the son of the cripple and the idiot. The Cat's personality mirrors that of a cat—thinking only of his own well-being, vain and superficial. Despite all of his boasting, he has never had any genuine experience with a female. In early episodes, he serves no purpose but to be extra company to Lister and Rimmer. But he eventually becomes a self-trained navigator and shuttle-pilot, as well as helping with scavenging raids. His sense of smell allows him to detect floating objects outside of the shuttle. He almost never refers to anyone by the name, instead using insulting nicknames (e.g. Kryten is called "Peanut-head" or "Tin Can"). His vanity gives him false illusions about his singing and dancing abilities, but genuinely becomes better at these as the show progresses.
Kryten	David Ross	Guest: II
Kryten	Robert Llewellyn	III–XIII
Kryten is a neurotic Series 4000 mechanoid robotic servant. He is humanoid, with the exception of the flat cubical face and head. Once the personal servant of three attractive female crew members of the Nova 5, he was found and rescued ("Kryten"–S2, E1) by Lister who has been teaching Kryten to "break his programming" in order to develop his own personality and develop human character faults (such as the ability to lie). Despite leaving to live independently, he has become the crew's service mechanoid by series III, having been rescued by Lister once again and rebuilt following a spacebike accident. Despite restoring functionality, Lister was unable to restore Kryten's former personality (S3, E1). His programming forces him to be obedient to Lister and Rimmer, even when he knows Rimmer's instructions do not make sense. He also has encyclopedic knowledge on almost all known subjects (all having been uploaded to his memory). In series VII, after Rimmer leaves, Kryten is the most neurotic member of the crew and becomes jealous of Kochanski.
Holly	Norman Lovett	Main: I–II, VII & VIII, XIII; Guest: XII
Holly	Hattie Hayridge	III–V
Holly is an intelligent computer. Holly's user interface appears on the ship's screens as a disembodied human head on a black background, he can also be downloaded onto most television screens, and can roam around on a monitor mounted on a cart. Holly regularly proclaims that he has an IQ of 6,000, though there are frequent references to the fact that it is now much lower due to three million years alone—"computer senility". He is briefly replaced by a female Holly program having undergone a computer head sex change operation (as explained in the opening of S3, E1), with the new appearance based on Hilly (Holly's alter ego in "Parallel Universe"–S2, E6). The male version is restored when the crew find his original hardware. Early episodes opened with Holly giving a brief synopsis of the series, closing with an added joke.
Kristine Kochanski	Clare Grogan	Recurring: I, II; Guest: VI
Kristine Kochanski	Chloë Annett	Main: VII, VIII; Guest: IX
Kristine Z Kochanski is Red Dwarf's Navigation Officer who was the object of Lister's lust before she was killed by a radiation leak. In Series VII, the crew discover an alternative universe where Kochanski survived with Lister as her hologram ("Orobouros"–S7, E3). She ends up stuck on Starbug and takes Rimmer's place in the crew.

== Alter egos ==
=== Ace Rimmer ===
Arnold "Ace" Rimmer is an alter ego of Arnold Rimmer, also played by Chris Barrie. Ace first appears in the episode "Dimension Jump" (S4, E5) and is the antithesis of Rimmer. He is modest despite being a popular, knowledgeable, charming, daredevil hero. He comes from a seemingly perfect universe, in which Rimmer and Lister lived happy, successful lives and were good friends.

Ace's childhood paralleled Rimmer's up until the age of seven, when one of them was kept down a year at school while the other was not. The one kept down became Ace, who claimed that the shame of being a clear foot taller than his classmates inspired him to buckle down, fight back and work hard, while Arnold spent the rest of his life making excuses for his many failures.

Ace travels from planet to planet wearing a gold, fur-lined flight suit and saving people's lives. He was originally a test pilot for the Space Corps in his own universe, which also features an alter ego of Lister (nicknamed 'Spanners' by Ace) who is a flight engineer married to Kochanski and has twin sons, Jim and Bexley (the exact family to which the regular Lister always aspired). Ace's other friends included the Space Corps chaplain (played by the Cat actor Danny John-Jules), a receptionist named Mellie (played by Holly actress Hattie Hayridge), and Admiral Sir James Tranter, a superior officer whom Ace nicknames 'Bongo' (played by Kryten actor Robert Llewellyn). Despite being a happily married heterosexual, Bongo has a crush on Ace, who takes it in stride despite not reciprocating his feelings. Unlike Rimmer who desperately wanted to be an officer but turned out to be a vending machine attendant—Ace is a commander, but is always modest about the attention he receives. He spends time with Spanners, the engineering crew, and the enlisted men/ratings. He even refused to attend a lavish party his fellow officers threw for him, instead planning to go to a smaller one with Spanners and the enlisted.

Ace was offered the chance to pilot a brand-new spacecraft, one that can cross dimensions—leading to him meeting the Red Dwarf crew. Rimmer was instantly bitter that Ace was everything he dreamed of becoming himself. Ace had hoped that Rimmer was like him, but later regarded him as a "weasly maggot". In contrast, Ace and Lister became firm friends, prompting a lot of snide remarks from Rimmer about their 'relationship.'

Following his visit to Red Dwarf, Ace extended his adventures through the multi-verse and meeting many alternative versions of himself. When he finally became unable to carry on ("Stoke Me a Clipper"–S7, E2), he passed his legacy on to another version of himself, who became a new Ace. In turn, when it was the new Ace's time, he passed the torch on. As each Ace died, their light bees were sent in orbit in small yellow 'coffins' around an unknown planet, and by the time Red Dwarf's Rimmer took on the mantle in "Stoke Me a Clipper", the billions of Ace Rimmers who came before him had formed a golden ring similar to Saturn's (and resembling the logo of the TV series).

Ace's catchphrase is "Smoke me a kipper, I'll be back for breakfast!", and a running gag in the series is that everyone who encounters Ace exclaims "What a guy!" in adoration, once even in German: "Was für ein Kerl!"

After encountering a polymorph in "Emohawk: Polymorph II" (S6, E4), the original hologram Rimmer is robbed of his emotional bitterness, and as result takes on a personality identical to Ace. The now brave and heroic Rimmer saves the lives of the crew when the Emohawk turns into a grenade, but must reluctantly return to his cowardly ways upon defeating the creature.

=== Duane Dibbley ===
Duane Dibbley is the dorky alter ego of the Cat, played by Danny John-Jules with a bowl haircut and a large overbite. He first appears in the episode "Back To Reality (S5, E6)", as part of a hallucinogenic experience, designed to cause despair in the Dwarfers. He then returns in "Emohawk: Polymorph II," caused by a polymorph absorbing the Cat's cool (Rimmer described him as "looking so geeky, he couldn't even get into a science fiction convention", Ace later being unable to even mercy-kill Duane in order to defeat the Emohawk as he was so pathetic it would be like killing Bambi). In the BBC's Red Dwarf Night he appears in the Can't Cook, Won't Cook parody (Can't Smeg Won't Smeg) after The Cat refuses to take part in the show on the same team as Rimmer.

In Series VIII episode "Back in the Red" (S8, E1–3), the Cat, Lister, Kochanski and Kryten disguised themselves as "The Dibbley Family" by wearing mop heads on their heads and large false teeth.

Duane has the opposite personality to the Cat—he is a lot more nervous and shy than the Cat. He is very clumsy lacking the Cat's grace, he also treats others with more respect. Not having the Cat's ego he referred to Rimmer as 'sir', something the real Cat would not do. Duane appears to possess a great deal of self-hatred as he is aware of his differences and often states that he hates Duane Dibbley.

The character's brief appearances have proved incredibly popular. John-Jules' explanation for this was "No-one's ever written a black nerd before."

=== Arlene Rimmer, Deb Lister, the Dog and Hilly ===
Played by Suzanne Bertish, Angela Bruce, Matthew Devitt and Hattie Hayridge. They are alternative versions of Arnold Rimmer, Dave Lister, the Cat and Holly from a parallel universe in the episode "Parallel Universe" (1988). With the exception of the Dog, the others are female versions of the regular characters. Dog has dog-like traits—for example a hatred of bathing. The Cat takes an instant dislike to him, but the Dog does not pick up on this and continues to mistake Cat for another dog.

=== Queeg 500 ===
Queeg 500 (S2, E5) is a "back-up" computer AI system with an IQ of 500, played by Charles Augins. Queeg claims that Holly's IQ is not 6,000 but 6 and that Holly gets his information from a children's science book, called the Junior Colour Encyclopaedia of Space. He demotes Holly to night-watchman and takes over the ship.

Queeg soon makes the crew's lives hell. Rimmer is forced to take regular long-distance runs whilst Cat and Lister are made to work for tiny amounts of food. They appeal to Holly who challenges Queeg to a game of chess, with the loser being deleted. Holly loses the game and fades from view. He then returns and announces that he was Queeg all the time. The whole thing was a practical joke to teach the crew to appreciate Holly even though he has gone a bit "computer senile".

"Queeg" is a reference to Lieutenant Commander Philip Francis Queeg, USN, a fictional character in Herman Wouk's 1951 novel The Caine Mutiny and 1954 film of the same name. Both Queeg and Queeg 500 are in command of a vessel and prone to eccentric behaviour. Both display an oppressive command style and are prone to unprovoked angry outbursts.

== Shipboard robots ==
=== The Skutters ===
The skutters are motorized service and maintenance robots that stand at around two feet (61 cm) tall, appearing as motorized boxes with a single limb each, ending in a three-clawed hand with an electronic eye. They perform menial tasks around the ship, such as sweeping the cinema floors after a movie, or painting the corridor walls. The skutters are unable to speak (except with bleeping noises), but can usually make their feelings clear. Their hands are particularly well designed for flicking the V (a.k.a. "up yours") or flipping the bird, most often to Rimmer. Their behavior is rather more human-like than might be expected for such crudely designed robots; they play cowboys-and-Indians, enjoy watching films, are highly emotional and appear to be somewhat unstable and malfunctional, presumably as a result of three million years of continuous operation.

The tiny, motorized, three-clawed service droids were actual working models, save the episode "The End" (S1, E1), where the skutters were a post-production addition to the chicken soup nozzle scene. They were made up of various parts including old shoe boxes and the engines of radio-controlled cars. Interference originating from the radios of a nearby taxicab company, which was particularly busy during filming of the episode "Future Echoes" (S1, E2), caused havoc with the skutter models on set. One reportedly poked Craig Charles in the eye, and another launched an attack on Chris Barrie's groin. Coincidentally, the skutters had been scripted as very inept towards their maintenance work and mischievous towards humans.

Kryten referred to a skutter by the name Bob in the episode "The Last Day" (S3, E6). Series VIII also featured a skutter named Bob along with his "wife" Madge. The skutters are fans of John Wayne, having their broom cupboard filled with Western props and pin-ups of Wayne, and are members of the John Wayne Fan Club.

Two skutters appeared in the US pilot playing poker until one of them gives Rimmer what looks like "the finger". These skutters were given a revamp in design: a wider, rounded body with a complex neck and a narrow head with concealed eyes that pop up.

The skutters are unusually capable of sex, as in the episode Parallel Universe, a "male" Skutter and its "female" equivalent from the parallel universe are seen with "children".

In "Back to Earth" (S9, E1–3), the skutters had been given a complete redesign, and were added in post as a CG effect rather than being a remote controlled mechanism, as there was not enough money in the budget to even revamp the casing. Due to this, as the actors had no visual cue, Danny John-Jules was required to step in as a replacement for a skutter so that Chris Barrie had something to react to.

=== Talkie Toaster ===
Talkie Toaster is a minor character, a monomaniacal talking toaster that tries to steer every conversation to the subject of toast.

Owned by Lister, Talkie Toaster is a toaster with artificial intelligence that is completely obsessed with making toast and annoys everyone on board. In Series I (and a deleted scene in Series II), it appears as a standard 1970s-style toaster made from stainless steel but with a circular light on the side which flashes as he speaks, and is voiced by John Lenahan, with a transatlantic accent. In Series IV, it appears as a red toaster made of plastic, with its name "Talkie Toaster" emblazoned on the side, and rather more flashing red and green lights and is voiced by David Ross (who played Kryten in his title episode).

The Toaster repeatedly interjects in conversations and whenever possible tries to steer the conversation towards toast. Eventually Lister smashes the Toaster with a hammer. Kryten repairs the toaster in order to use it as a guinea-pig for "intelligence compression"—restoring Holly's former intelligence (the ultimate aim is to cure Holly's computer senility) at the cost of reducing her operational lifespan. The toaster's repaired personality is somewhat different from the original: it now has a different voice and no longer tries to hide its obsession with toast.

The Talkie Toaster returns in the Series XII episode "Mechocracy" (2017), where it is again voiced by David Ross and depicted in its Series IV appearance. In the episode, the toaster has spent nearly two decades switched off in the garbage hold. Kryten and Lister make a deal with the toaster to swing the election for president of the machines on Red Dwarf in Kryten's favour. After Kryten wins, the Cat locks Rimmer in the garbage hold alone with the toaster until Monday.

Outside the TV series, Talkie Toaster plays a secondary, yet vital role in the book Better Than Life, where Holly revives him in order to have someone to talk to while the crew are stuck in the virtual reality game. In this version, it is toaster who figures out how to restore Holly's IQ after perusing Holly's manuals, and later is also the one who informs the Dwarfers how to survive a black hole, Holly having given him this information while showing off his intelligence before he had to shut himself down (although he 'required' the crew to eat multiple pieces of toast before he gave them the information, Kryten having to eat Rimmer's share).

Talkie Toaster's interviews with various Red Dwarf characters (complete with offers of toast) can be found on Red Dwarf's official website.

=== The Chocolate Dispenser ===
The Chocolate Dispenser (voiced by Tony Slattery) has its only appearance in the Series VIII episode "Only the Good...". Having been stolen from by Rimmer, it sets off an alarm to alert the Captain of chocolate being stolen ("Alert, alert! A choccie nut bar has been removed without payment!") It later goes on to inform Rimmer concerning his becoming its 'nemesis.' His appearance in the last scene involved it telling Rimmer that the formula which he got from the parallel universe, which would stop the virus that was destroying the ship, had in fact become the formula for the virus again; then firing a drink can at Rimmer's head with its final lines, "Every dog has its day, and this is the day, and I'm the dog!" and Rimmer is knocked unconscious.

In the alternative ending, the virus' antidote in the other world became the virus and the virus in that world became the antidote and then, the ship was saved from destruction, they were no longer in the Tank and later, Rimmer finally pays the money he owes the dispenser, but it still fires a can at Rimmer's head, knocking him unconscious anyway as Rimmer says, "Every dog has its day...", and after he is knocked unconscious, the Chocolate Dispenser finishes with, "...and this is the day, and I'm the dog!" and he howls as the audience applauds.

=== The Revolving Toilet ===
The Revolving Toilet is an artificially intelligent toilet which is located on a revolving plinth behind the washbasin in Lister's bedroom. It speaks in a dull male voice and bears a sign which reads "Now irradiate your hands."

The Revolving Toilet appeared in Balance of Power, in which it appeared to Lister when he dismissively responded "Oh crap" to Holly's statement that he thought Rimmer was the best person to bring back as hologram because he would keep Lister sane. When Lister says he did not want the toilet, the Revolving Toilet apologizes and says that it was not paying attention.

== Other Red Dwarf crew ==
=== Captain Frank Hollister ===
Captain Frank Hollister is played by American actor Mac McDonald in the television series.

Hollister is the captain of the interplanetary mining vessel, the Red Dwarf. He is seen in the first episode, in which he sentences Dave Lister to eighteen months in stasis for bringing his unquarantined cat on board. When Lister is released, Hollister, along with the rest of the crew, have been dead dust for three million years.

In Series VIII, with the crew resurrected by nanobots, Hollister becomes a main character. This is also the series where it is revealed that the captain is in fact "Dennis the Donut Boy" and that he had abused confidential files in order to work his way up the ranks and become captain.

Captain Hollister briefly returns in the Series XII episode, "Skipper" (2017), where Rimmer uses a quantum skipper to travel to a universe shortly before the crew of Red Dwarf is killed by a radiation leak. Rimmer finds Hollister attempting to use the escape pod, which jams as the radiation leak reaches him.

In the first Red Dwarf novel, the captain is a woman named "Kirk" and in the pilot for the unaired American version of the show the captain is a woman named "Tau".

Hollister's characterization is inconsistent. Before the accident, he was a fair, just, responsible leader. After resurrection, he becomes indulgent and corrupt. he is also depicted as indulgent and corrupt in the Series XII episode, "Skipper" (2017), where Rimmer finds Hollister attempting to use the escape pod, when Rimmer is using Kryten's new "Quantum Skipper" to travel to other universes, this one set shortly before the crew of Red Dwarf is killed by a radiation leak.

=== Olaf Petersen ===
Olaf Petersen is played by Mark Williams in the television series. He is a Danish catering officer on the Red Dwarf mining vessel.

First appearing in the pilot episode, Petersen is the best friend of Dave Lister. He, Lister, Selby and Chen spend most of their free time getting drunk. Like the rest of the crew, Petersen is killed in the radiation leak. His remains are found in the Drive Room as a white powder that Lister tasted. He appears in two other episodes in the first two series. Petersen is resurrected along with the rest of the crew in Series VIII, but is not seen, although often referred to.

=== Selby and Chen ===
Selby and Chen are played by David Gillespie and Paul Bradley, respectively. Chen works in the ship's kitchens and both spend their time drunk. First appearing in the pilot episode, they spend most of their free time with Lister and Petersen getting drunk. Like the rest of the crew they are killed in the radiation leak. When the crew are resurrected in Series VIII, Selby and Chen are the first crew members the regular characters encountered. They have not been seen again.

=== George McIntyre ===
George McIntyre was a minor character aboard Red Dwarf.

In the novel Infinity Welcomes Careful Drivers, McIntyre was an officer on Red Dwarf who was severely depressed due to growing debt problems. After a horrifying experience in the hands of gangsters (he returned to Red Dwarf carrying his nose in a Titan Hilton Hotel napkin), McIntyre committed suicide. He was brought back as a hologram and replaced the ship's first hologram, Frank Saunders (much to Saunders' relief). Captain Hollister notes in his personal log that McIntyre was not especially crucial to the success of the mission, but was brought back anyway because Hollister was curious to hear his resurrection speech.

According to the original script of "The End", McIntyre was killed by a minor radiation leak from the drive plate that Rimmer failed to repair.

In the television series, McIntyre was only seen at his "Welcome Back Reception" thanking everyone for flowers and turning up at his funeral, and his choice of music at the funeral was "See You Later Alligator" (in certain broadcasts this song was replaced with football anthem "Here We Go") as his ashes were blasted into space. George was portrayed by Robert McCulley. He was switched off during the radioactive disaster, for Arnold Rimmer to replace him afterwards by Holly to keep Dave Lister sane. The cause of his death is not mentioned in the TV series.

=== Frank Todhunter ===
Frank Todhunter appeared in the first episode only and was played by Robert Bathurst. A well spoken officer, he tries to placate the tension between Rimmer and Lister (before siding with Lister against Rimmer; "Oh, Rimmer, you are a smeghead"), and attempts to describe how the stasis booth works to the latter. He is also an exam invigilator causing him to be someone that Rimmer severely dislikes. As part of Kristine Kochanski's story to ease Lister's claustrophobia, she claims the Todhunter from her dimension is gay, despite being a married man and notorious womanizer.

=== Yvonne McGruder ===
According to "Thanks for the Memory", Yvonne McGruder was the ship's female boxing champion, and the only woman Rimmer ever had sex with while he was alive. She is mentioned in a number of episodes, but her only on-screen appearance is inside a simulation in "Better Than Life", where she is played by Judy Hawkins.

=== Prison Governor Ackerman ===
Prison Governor "Nicey" Ackerman is played by Graham McTavish.

Seen only in the eighth series, Mr Ackerman is a stereotypically sadistic prison governor, enjoying his power over the inmates in Floor 13 (Red Dwarf's brig), "The Tank". He has a glass eye, which at one point is stolen from him. Prone to overreaction, he is a victim of pranks from the inmates on more than one occasion. After having sodium pentothal put into his inhaler as a prank, he shows up late at a meeting with the captain and reveals that he was sorry, but he was busy having "jiggy jiggy" with the Science Officer's wife, and needed time to change out of his Batman costume. Following the prank Lister suggested that a Tarzan costume would be better, since it would take less time to change out of.

According to various interviews on the Red Dwarf website, Ackerman was originally part of the same prison ship that was transporting the simulant encountered in the episode "Justice," but escaped from the ship after accidentally enabling the simulants to get free.

=== Warden Knot ===
Warden Knot is played by Shend.

Like governor Ackerman, Knot is a fairly sadistic warden. He dies in the episode Cassandra when Cassandra predicts that Arnold Rimmer will die of a heart attack. To evade death Rimmer pretends that Knot is called "Arnold Rimmer" and Knot, as according to prophecy, has a heart attack after learning he is going to die.

=== Kill Crazy ===
Kill Crazy is a minor character played by Jake Wood, appearing only in Series 8.

Kill Crazy (real name: Oswald Blenkinsop) is a psychopathic inmate who is obsessed with killing things. He is not very bright, thinking that he could fight a Tyrannosaurus Rex using his fists. His fighting buddy is Baxter (played by comedian Ricky Grover). When the prisoners arrive at the destination of a mission, Kill Crazy screams "Let's go kill something!" before charging forward at great pace and knocking himself unconscious on a low doorway.

=== Katerina Bartikovsky ===
Katerina Bartikovsky is played by Sophie Winkleman.

In a hallucination induced by the ink of a despair squid, the crew encounters Katerina Bartikovsky. In this hallucination, Katerina was the science officer of the Red Dwarf before the accident. She is of Russian heritage and speaks with a strong accent. Her personality is strict, serious and judgmental, with a certain amount of scientific genius and arrogance. She suddenly appears as a hard-light hologram in "Back to Earth, Part One" after Rimmer's negligence nearly results in the death of his crewmates. She uses her superior rank to make herself ship's hologram and tries to have Rimmer deactivated and destroyed; it is also evident that she has personal disdain for him. Meanwhile, she attempts to bring Lister home with a device she made with a mining laser and the DNA of a dimension-hopping squid (the hallucination's explanation for the despair squid), which the rest of the crew enters through to get back to Earth, which allows Rimmer to escape deletion. She later encounters Rimmer in a street on Earth, claiming to have gone through a second portal, where they discuss the morals of deleting holograms. Katerina argues that since holograms are simulated dead humans, then killing them is acceptable. Using this logic, Rimmer immediately pushes her into traffic, whisking her away. She is not seen again after this incident.

=== "Birdman" ===
Birdman is played by Ian Masters

Birdman is a deranged but harmless inmate in the Red Dwarf prison area known only as 'The Hole', he appear usually along with his sparrow Pete who is 9 sparrow years old, after Pete dies from being too excited Birdman is shocked fortunately Kryten uses the time wand to revive Pete, but instead devolves him into a Tyrannosaurus rex, after, Birdman tries to feed Pete some oats but then he is sneezed over and eaten leaving his boots only left. After the changes are undone he is revived. He appears in Pete part one and two.

== Miscellaneous characters ==
=== The Cat Priest ===
The Cat Priest was, until The Promised Land, the only member of the species Felis sapiens seen on the television show Red Dwarf apart from The Cat. He was played by Noel Coleman. One of his hands is depicted with a different skin tone compared to the rest of his body, possibly implying that the Cat race possessed numerous variations in their skin colours (similar to how modern cats have different fur colours).

The Cat Priest was blind. He was the Cat's teacher and guardian after his parents died, but Cat was never really interested and preferred to go off investigating. The Cat Priest was once a devout follower of the Cat religion, but over time as the Cat race fled Red Dwarf and those who stayed aboard died he lost his faith ("Waiting for God"–S1, E4).

When the Cat Priest was dying, Lister appeared and revealed that he was the Cat god Cloister. The Priest apologized for losing his faith, saying "You tested me, and I failed you." Lister assured him that he had not failed, and he would get into Fuchal. The Cat Priest's last words before he died of a heart attack were "This is the happiest day of my ..."

In the remastered version of the episode in which he appeared, the Cat Priest's body was cremated and the ashes jettisoned into space.

=== Mr. Flibble ===
Mr. Flibble is a hologramatical hand-puppet penguin. He is fluffy and malevolent, and often "very cross". In the episode Quarantine (S5, E4), Arnold Rimmer wore Mr. Flibble on his hand and together they terrorized the rest of the crew. Rimmer had been infected by a hologramatical virus, the "Hex virus," which gave him mental powers, but also made him completely psychotic. Both Mr. Flibble and Rimmer were armed with the power of Hex vision. When they attack with this power, their eyes glow red, and then a deadly beam of energy is discharged from their eyes.

Although he only appears in one episode and had no audible lines, Mr. Flibble became a fan favourite, and is now an interviewer on the Red Dwarf official website.

=== Hudzen-10 ===
Hudzen-10 appeared only in the Series III episode "The Last Day" (S3, E6), and was portrayed by Gordon Kennedy. A replacement for Kryten, Hudzen-10 followed Red Dwarf for many years, eventually being driven insane. After the Red Dwarf crew told him to leave the ship, he deemed them all to be members of non-human species (bar Lister, whom he designated 'What the Hell!', concluding that he was 'Barely Human'), and attempted to kill them all. He was only stopped when Kryten told him that 'Silicon Heaven' did not exist, forcing him into an existential dilemma.

=== Rimmer's Dad ===
In "Future Echoes" (1988), Rimmer implies that his father had committed suicide when he mentions that he had given advice about how you can cope with anything with a short haircut "just before that rather unfortunate suicide business". However, according to a letter from Rimmer's mum "Better Than Life" (1988), Rimmer's dad had died peacefully in his sleep (or possibly in his jeep), and Rimmer appeared to have been unaware of this prior to the fact. In "Better Than Life", Rimmer mentions that his father was unsuccessful in his attempts to join the Space Corps and consequently became obsessed with ensuring his sons would (he stretched them on a traction machine to make them tall enough and withheld dinner unless they could answer questions on astronavigation correctly). He admits to Lister that he loathed the man and his dearest wish is to one day hear his father say that he is proud of Rimmer. He is portrayed in the episode by John Abineri, when, while playing the Better Than Life game, Rimmer encounters a simulation of his father who still does not show any pride in his son, instead calling Rimmer a smeghead, to which the Cat claims is his fantasy in the game.

He next appears in "The Beginning" (2012), played by Simon Treves. It is shown that Rimmer's father was also a teacher at Rimmer's school and used him as a guinea pig in an experiment about peer pressure (Rimmer's father instructed the other students to give incorrect answers). Rimmer is shown to have a hololamp containing a message from his father that was to be played when Rimmer achieved his dream of becoming an officer—when stuck for a plan when called upon to mastermind the salvation of Red Dwarf from Simulants, Rimmer decided to take the Cat's advice and play the message anyway to escape his father's memory. The message shockingly revealed that Rimmer was actually the son of the family's gardener. This does not affect Rimmer badly (as the rest of the crew had worried it would), instead liberating him from his lifelong fear of letting his ancestors down and allowing him to come up with a plan to save the day.

=== Rimmer's Mum ===
Rimmer's mother, played by Kalli Greenwood, is referred to several times in the series, not altogether consistently. In "Polymorph" (S3, E3), Rimmer describes her affectionately as "prim and proper", almost austere but with no time for fools. Yet in "The Last Day" (S3, E6), he indicates that she was overly sexually promiscuous. In "Dimension Jump" she is briefly shown as a mother who is concerned for her son's upbringing and education but is insensitive to his feelings (for example, lecturing him about his situation at school while he is hanging upside down as the result of a mean prank by his brothers, rather than help him down first).

In the episode "Polymorph", the Polymorph makes Rimmer angry so it can suck out his anger; to do this it changes into Rimmer's mum and has sexual intercourse with Lister, who has lost his sense of fear. Holly repeatedly stresses to Rimmer that this is all a ploy to anger him, so he manages to keep his cool until the Polymorph taunts him, saying "The things this boy can do with Alphabetti Spaghetti..."

She is briefly mentioned in the episode "Terrorform" (S5, E3) when Lister, Cat and Kryten hunt for Rimmer in the 'Swamp of Despair' (they find a bloodsucking leech with her face, a physical embodiment of how Rimmer perceives her).

=== Howard Rimmer ===
One of Arnold's often mentioned brothers. Howard Rimmer (Mark Dexter) appeared in the Series 10 episode "Trojan" (S10, E1). Howard is a crew member aboard a ship that makes contact with the Red Dwarf crew. Howard's hologrammatic status suggest that he, like Arnold, died in active service and was resurrected. Originally described by Arnold as a great man, we discover that Howard is very similar in character to Arnold himself—opening the possibility that he also was fathered by the Rimmer family's gardener.

=== Frank Rimmer ===
Frank Rimmer (Chris Barrie in a dual role) is another of Arnold's brothers. Frank appeared in the episode "Timeslides" (S3, E5) when Kryten accidentally mutates one of Frank's wedding pictures, allowing Lister to walk into it. Frank is extremely annoyed at Lister for blocking the shot and hits him several times before Lister disappears back into the present. In the episode, Frank appears to be wearing a Space Corps full-dress uniform.

"Frank" is also the name of his paternal uncle, his namesake, who is the father of two daughters, Sarah and Alice, is revealed to have been having an affair with his sister-in-law, and who inadvertently gave his nephew, Arnold, his first french kiss (after having mistaken him for Rimmer's mother in a dark room on a vacation).

== Guest stars ==
Many co-stars of the first few episodes have gone on to careers away from Red Dwarf, such as Robert Bathurst, Tony Hawks, Paul Bradley, Craig Ferguson and Mark Williams. But later series have attracted established stars, some of whom were fans of the show.

Actor/Actress	Series	Episode(s)	Character
Jenny Agutter	VI	"Psirens"	Professor Mamet
Sarah Alexander	VII	"Stoke Me a Clipper"	Queen of Camelot
Charles Augins	II	"Queeg"	Queeg 500
Nicholas Ball	IV	"Justice"	Psychopathic Simulant
Morwenna Banks	II	"Stasis Leak"	Lift Hostess
Daniel Barker	XI	"Give and Take" "Officer Rimmer" "Krysis" "Can of Worms"	Lift; Croquet Commentator; The Universe; Alien Natural History Presenter
Rupert Bates	I, III, IV	"Balance of Power" "Confidence and Paranoia" "Timeslides" "Camille"	Trout a la Creme/Chef; Food Machine; Bodyguard; Hector Blob
Robert Bathurst	I	"The End"	Frank Todhunter
James Baxter	X	"Lemons"	Jesus
Hetty Baynes	IV	"Dimension Jump"	Cockpit Computer
Rebecca Blackstone	X, XI	"Fathers and Suns" "Twentica"	Pree; Big Bang Beryl
Gary Cady	X	"The Beginning"	Dominator Zlurth
Dominic Coleman	XI	"Krysis"	Butler
Lee Cornes	I	"Confidence and Paranoia"	Paranoia
Brian Cox	VII	"Stoke Me a Clipper"	King of Camelot
Stephen Critchlow	XI	"Officer Rimmer"	Captain Edwin Herring
Mark Dexter	X	"Trojan"	Howard Rimmer
Jack Docherty	V	"The Inquisitor"	Inquisitor
Anita Dobson	VI	"Psirens"	Captain Tau
Susan Earl	X	"Trojan"	Sim Crawford
Craig Ferguson	I	"Confidence and Paranoia"	Confidence
Ricky Grover	VIII	"Pete: Part I" "Pete: Part II" "Only the Good..."	Baxter
Alex Hardy	X	"The Beginning"	Chancellor Wednesday
Ainsley Harriott	VI	"Emohawk: Polymorph II"	GELF Chief
Tony Hawks	I, II, III, IV	"Future Echoes" "Waiting for God" "Me²" "Better Than Life" "Stasis Leak" "Backwards" "Meltdown"	Dispensing Machine Restaurant Ad; The Guide; Suitcase; Compere; Caligula
Don Henderson	VII	"Beyond a Joke"	Simulant
Liz Hickling	VI	"Gunmen of the Apocalypse" "Rimmerworld"	Simulant Lieutenant
Jane Horrocks	V	"Holoship"	Nirvanah Crane
Colin Hoult	X	"The Beginning"	Chancellor Thursday
Indira Joshi	X	"Lemons"	Erin
Gordon Kennedy	III	"The Last Day"	Hudzen-10
Denis Lill	VI	"Gunmen of the Apocalypse"	Simulant Captain/Death
Clayton Mark	IV	"Meltdown"	Elvis Presley
Gary Martin	VII	"Epideme"	Epideme (voice)
Geraldine McEwan	VIII	"Cassandra"	Cassandra
Kika Mirylees	VIII	"Back in the Red: Part I" "Back in the Red: Part II"	Doc Newton
Ken Morley	VII	"Stoke Me a Clipper"	Captain Voorhese
Richard Ng	IX	"Back to Earth, Part Two"	Swallow
Richard O'Callaghan	IX, X	"Back to Earth, Part Three" "The Beginning"	The Creator; Hogey the Roguey
Lucie Pohl	XI	"Twentica"	Harmony de Gauthier
Richard Ridings	IV, VI	"DNA" "Psirens	D.N.A. Computer Voice; Crazed Astro
Kerry Shale	X	"Fathers and Suns"	Medi-Bot, Taiwan Tony
Tony Slattery	VIII	"Only The Good..."	Vending Machine (voice)
Arthur Smith	III	"Backwards"	Night Club Owner
Timothy Spall	V	"Back to Reality"	Andy the Technician
Koo Stark	III	"Timeslides"	Sabrina Mulholland-Jjones
Maggie Steed	V	"Quarantine"	Dr Hildegarde Lanstrom
Jeremy Swift	IX	"Back to Earth, Part Two"	Noddy
Simon Treves	X	"The Beginning"	Lecturer Rimmer
Lenny Von Dohlen	V	"Back to Reality"	Fascist Policeman
Don Warrington	V	"Holoship"	Commander Binks
Ruby Wax	III	"Timeslides"	TV Presenter Blaize Falconberger
Steven Wickham	VI, X	"Emohawk: Polymorph II" "Entangled"	GELF Bride; BEGG Chief
Nigel Williams	VI	"Legion"	Legion
Sophie Winkleman	IX	"Back to Earth, Part One" "Back to Earth, Part Two"	Katerina Bartikovsky
Michael J. Shannon	VII	"Tikka to Ride"	President John F. Kennedy
Toby Aspin	VII	"Tikka to Ride"	Lee Harvey Oswald
Adolf Hitler(Timeslides)	III	"Timeslides"	Himself(Footage)
