= Samsara (Red Dwarf) =

- Red Dwarf episode
- Episode no.: Series 11; Episode 2
- Directed by: Doug Naylor
- Written by: Doug Naylor
- Original air date: 29 September 2016

Guest appearances
- Dan Tetsell as Green; Maggie Service as Barker; Eddie Bagayawa as Captain Tom Kadri

Episode chronology
| ← Previous "Twentica" | Next → "Give & Take" |
- Red Dwarf XI

"Samsara" is the second episode of Red Dwarf XI and the 63rd in the series run. Originally broadcast on the British television channel Dave on 29 September 2016, it was made available early on 23 September 2016 on UKTV Play.

After receiving an escape pod containing the ashes of its former occupants, the crew venture underwater to the escape pod's crashed ship, the Samsara.

== Synopsis ==
Lister (Craig Charles) and Rimmer (Chris Barrie) are playing a game of "Mineopoly" to settle a bet, with Lister secretly cheating using stashed cards. It comes down to the wire, only for Rimmer to roll a losing 2 and a 1, which he rolls again several more times. Meanwhile, as Red Dwarf nears an ocean moon, Kryten (Robert Llewellyn) receives a message from a woman on board an escape pod in orbit which is cut off. Bringing the pod aboard reveals its two occupants, Professor Rachel Barker and Colonel Jim Green, reduced to ash. Looking into the escape pod logs, Kryten reveals that Barker was a computer specialist whilst Green was the mission director, and both were married but not to each other. He also identifies the spaceship the pod belongs to, Samsara, and locates it crashed on the ocean moon. The crew take Starbug down to investigate.

When the crew arrive, they discover skeletons of the former crew engaged in various sexual positions, eventually deducing they all died in a mass orgy with the ship's captain being violently strangled in the midst of the chaos. They split in pairs, with Lister and Cat (Danny John-Jules) heading-off to the cafeteria and Rimmer and Kryten discovering the ship's "karma drive", which manipulates reality to deal out rewards or punishments in accordance with its programmed code of conduct; Rimmer voices his objection to this concept, citing society's everchanging views on morality. Lister manages to get his dreadlocks caught in a garbage disposal, whereafter Cat saves Lister by cutting off the stuck dreadlock. The machine spits the knife back out, landing directly into Cat's foot.

Eventually, the Samsara loses its power and slowly begins to fall off the cliff its perched on. With no solutions to think of, a frustrated Rimmer insults Kryten, which leads into the ship regaining power. The two deduce the karma drive has been reprogrammed to reward negative behavior. When they manage to get back to Lister and Cat, Kryten immediately reacts by repeatedly punching Lister, telling him not to be kind to him, as they have figured out what happened.

It is revealed through flashbacks that Barker (Maggie Service) and Green (Dan Tetsell) boarded the Samsara with the intention of resuming an affair they had begun at a previous posting. However the karma drive soon began to punish them by making their living conditions intolerable. Eventually the ship's captain confronts them about their unethical behaviour, and tells them that as long as they stop the affair on board the ship, the drive will leave them alone. Barker however convinces Green to give her access into the karma drive mainframe so that she could reprogram it for one night, thereby rewarding the unethical and punishing good behaviour. This quickly backfires and causes anarchy on board the ship. The two fled on board the ship's escape pod, resting in stasis until they came across another ship. Due to Barker's attempt at warning the crew, she and Green were vaporized, as their tampering led the karma drive to have its influence stretch past even the ocean moon and to everything in its vicinity.

As Lister laments at how two people's love brought down an entire ship, the crew decide to head back to Red Dwarf as unethically as they can. At this point, Lister accidentally drops one of his Mineopoloy cards and an angry Rimmer storms after him.

== Production ==
The flashbacks on board the Samsara pre-accident involve none of the core crew, a rare occurrence in the series that has only occurred twice previously, in The Inquisitor and The Beginning, respectively.

The episode was originally going to involve the crew stuck on malfunctioning elevators, referenced in the original title for "Samsara", Lift Off.

== Reception ==
"Samsara" received mixed reviews from critics and fans. Writing for Digital Spy, Tom Eames offered a more positive view on the episode, "[It] felt like an episode that would have been right at home in the days of series 4 or 5. This makes us really excited for the rest of XI."
