= Can of Worms (Red Dwarf) =

- Red Dwarf episode
- Episode no.: Series 11; Episode 6
- Directed by: Doug Naylor
- Written by: Doug Naylor
- Original air date: 27 October 2016

Guest appearances
- Bentley Kalu as Mercenoid; Dominique Moore as Ankita; Daniel Barker as Alien Natural History Presenter; Maria Yarjah as Cat Lady 1; Shanice Stewart-Jones as Cat Lady 2

Episode chronology
← Previous "Krysis"	Next → "Cured"
- Red Dwarf XI

"Can of Worms" is the sixth episode of Red Dwarf XI and the 67th in the series run. Originally broadcast on the British television channel Dave on 27 October 2016, it was made available early on 21 October 2016 on UKTV Play.

After launching a rescue mission, the crew meet another member of Cat's elusive species.

== Synopsis ==
The crew have recently acquired a mind-altering device able to perform surgeries on one's personality, such as removing some traits entirely. Kryten (Robert Llewellyn) offers Rimmer (Chris Barrie) an operation; however, he quickly ducks out once he learns of its use of needles and lasers. Meanwhile, the other crew discover Lister (Craig Charles) has fallen asleep behind the wheel of Starbug, and they are knocked off their original course back to Red Dwarf. They originally intend to take a course through "GELF country" home to a race of vampires known to feast on the blood of virgins; however, they decide on a different route due to Cat (Danny John-Jules) revealing he is a virgin. Just then, Kryten picks up a ship on a death-dive into a black hole, containing one droid captain and a prisoner, so the crew venture aboard (with Rimmer staying behind). Kryten and Lister realise the droid is a Mercenoid, who looks to sacrifice himself into the black hole in order to be rewarded in Silicon Heaven and is taking the prisoner with him. After defeating the ship's hostile droid owner, they rescue the prisoner (Dominique Moore), who turns out to be a female felis sapien and quickly gets friendly with Cat.

Back onboard Red Dwarf, Cat and his new female friend run off to his quarters while Kryten examines the Mercenoid's personal black box. He discovers the supposed female felis sapien is really a polymorph, and alerts the crew who realise the Mercenoid was actually trying to destroy the Polymorph by diving into the black hole. They rush to stop Cat, however Cat has already had intercourse with it. When the crew eventually meet up with him, they discover the polymorph has died and its eggs are inside Cat. They attempt to remove them surgically, however they transform into tumors and threaten to kill Cat unless they are born "in the normal way."

After Cat's pregnancy and eventual birthing of the polymorphs, the crew prepare to throw them out of an airlock. The polymorph babies attempt to avoid death by turning into cute animals, and Cat asks the crew for a moment alone with them, to which they oblige. After some time, the crew wonder what is keeping him, and discover Cat has taken the polymorph spawn and hid them in the diesel decks of the ship. The three decide to use the mind-altering device from earlier to remove Lister's emotions, making him invisible to the polymorphs. After heading down there, they are quickly outmatched by the polymorph spawn, who have taken their respective forms and confused them. As the crew and polymorphs take the elevator to find an x-ray to use, Cat meets them, wielding two guns, and kills every polymorph single-handedly as a "momma always knows her kids."

== Production ==
The costume used for the Mercenoid was recycled from the production of The Chronicles of Riddick, having also been used in The Sarah Jane Adventures and Doctor Who previously. Like other episodes in Series XI, the opening scene of this episode was reshot during production of Series XII to utilize the new Starbug Upper Deck room.

== Reception ==
"Can of Worms" received mixed reviews from critics and fans. Writing for Red Dwarf fansite, Ganymede & Titan, Ian Symes described his main issue with the episode, "The main problem is with the plot, and it's a return to a problem that dogged X but had seemingly been eliminated from XI until now. There are too many ideas here to comfortably fit inside half an hour of sitcom." In a more positive review, Tom Eames of Digital Spy called the episode, "a genuinely thrilling and hilarious instalment, and one which reminded us of the action-packed sci-fi era of series 4 and 5."
