= Twentica =

- Red Dwarf episode
- Episode no.: Series 11; Episode 1
- Directed by: Doug Naylor
- Written by: Doug Naylor
- Original air date: 22 September 2016

Guest appearances
- Kevin Eldon as 4 of 27; Lucie Pohl as Harmony; David Sterne as Einstein Bob; Sam Douglas as Bouncer; Rebecca Blackstone as Big Bang Beryl; Kyle James as Nearly Dead Guy; Suanne Braun as Cpt. Dorothy McCutcheon; David Menkin as Lt. Clarence O'Neil; Alexis Dubus as 3 of 63

Episode chronology
← Previous "The Beginning"	Next → "Samsara"
- Red Dwarf XI

"Twentica" is the first episode of science fiction sitcom Red Dwarf XI, originally broadcast on the British television channel Dave on 22 September 2016, and made available early on 15 September on UKTV Play. The show again continued in its "classic" format of six standalone half-hour episodes, initially returned to in Series X four years previously.

The crew are tasked with overthrowing a regime of time-altering cyborgs, who have travelled back in time and enslaved humanity, outlawing technology to prevent them from ever becoming a threat.

== Plot ==
The crew are hailed by Expanoids, cyborgs similar to simulants, only with the desire to enslave humanity and not destroy it. They demand an artifact the crew scavenged off-screen, threatening them with a future Rimmer as their hostage. The Dwarfers yield and hand it over, but give chase when they discover the Expanoids heading through time to Earth in the 20th century.

The crew crash-land in the United States and, after recovering, make their way toward a nearby town, discovering they're in an alternate 1950s where the Expanoids have enslaved humanity and outlawed technology. After acquiring disguises, the gang head toward a speakeasy home to scientists in-hiding, led by Harmony de Gauthier (later revealed as Professor Baldwin). The crew attempt to configure an EMP that will knock the Expanoids offline, but are unable to find someone with the knowledge to program such a device.

After receiving a tip that Albert Einstein is strolling the streets as a homeless bum, the crew bring him back to the speakeasy only to discover he isn't Einstein but just a normal hobo named Bob. Just then the police arrive, and after catching Lister accidentally drinking from an Erlenmeyer flask, call in Expanoid back-up. After temporarily stalling them, Bob the bum manages to successfully install the device and knocks the Expanoids offline, saving the day. Harmony initiates a global EMP, and the crew hurriedly back their getaway before Starbug could be rendered offline and successfully return to Red Dwarf.

== Production ==
"Twentica" was the last episode shot for Series XI. The brief final scene takes place in the sleeping quarters aboard Red Dwarf. This was in fact shot during production of Series XII as Doug Naylor did not wish to overrun into Christmas. The lighting is very minimal, no doubt to hide the fact that the quarters have been redesigned.

== Reception ==
Den of Geek praised the episode for its visuals and for the fact that every main character "gets a moment in the spotlight", making it an ideal series opener. They went on however to criticise the conclusion, noting that it feels "out of kilter" with the rest of the episode and seemed it had to be filmed quickly to fill a gap. Digital Spy gave "Twentica" a mostly positive review calling it "the closest we've come to "proper" Dwarf since series 6" and noting that "this is an exciting time for Dwarf fans". An article by Red Dwarf fan website, Ganymede and Titan, stated that "plot, jokes and action scenes alike zip by, rarely outstaying their welcome and creating what is a dense and satisfying episode."
