= Mr Pye =

1953 novel by Mervyn Peake

- First edition
- Author: Mervyn Peake
- Published: Heinemann
- Publication date: 1953; 73 years ago
- Pages: 278

Mr Pye is a 1953 novel by English novelist Mervyn Peake, first published by Heinemann.

== Plot ==
Mr. Pye travels to the Channel Island of Sark to awaken a love of God in all the islanders. His landlady on the island, Miss Dredger, quickly becomes a devout follower of his teachings, and even agrees to allow the person she hates the most, Miss George, to stay in her house. As Pye does good works, he gradually feels a stinging feeling on his back. On further investigation, he discovers that he has started to grow angel's wings, and after consulting with a Harley Street doctor, he concludes that the best thing to do is to stop doing good deeds, and instead does bad deeds.

He engages in some deliberately malicious acts, and after a time this results in him growing horns on his forehead. He is unable to decide what to do, but eventually decides to reveal his horned condition to the islanders, who chase him to the edge of a cliff, from which he flies, using his wings.

== Editions ==
First published in 1953 by Heinemann, the novel was subsequently published in 1969 by Allison and Busby and in 1972 by Penguin Books.

== Adaptations ==
=== Radio ===
In 1957, Mr Pye was adapted into a radio play, by the author, retitled For Mr. Pye – An Island and broadcast by the BBC on 10 July 1957. It was a 60-minute radio play, produced by Francis Dillon. The script for this radio play is printed in the book Peake’s Progress (pp. 517–560).

In 2019, Mr Pye was adapted into a radio play by New Generation poet and playwright Glyn Maxwell and broadcast on BBC Radio 4 on 22 and 29 December 2019 as two 60-minute episodes, directed by Frank Stirling.

=== Television ===
In 1986, Mr Pye was adapted as a four-part Channel 4 miniseries starring Derek Jacobi, Judy Parfitt, Betty Marsden, and Richard O'Callaghan, filmed on Sark itself.
