= Give & Take (Red Dwarf) =

- Red Dwarf episode
- Episode no.: Series 11; Episode 3
- Directed by: Doug Naylor
- Written by: Doug Naylor
- Original air date: 6 October 2016

Guest appearances
- Mark Quarterly as Snacky (Voice); Tobias Wilson as Snacky (Body); Oliver Mason as Asclepius (Voice); Jami Reid Quarrell as Asclepius (Body); Daniel Barker as Lift

Episode chronology
← Previous "Samsara"	Next → "Officer Rimmer"
- Red Dwarf XI

"Give & Take" is the third episode of Red Dwarf XI and the 64th in the series run. Originally broadcast on the British television channel Dave on 6 October 2016, it was made available early on 30 September 2016 on UKTV Play.

== Synopsis ==
After detecting an abandoned derelict rich in resources, the crew head off to scavenge it. They split into pairs, with Rimmer (Chris Barrie) and Kryten (Robert Llewellyn) heading to recruit the facility's head medi-bot, Asclepius, but in a case of mistaken identity recruit its resident snack dispenser, Snacky, instead. Meanwhile, Lister (Craig Charles) and Cat (Danny John-Jules) discover the decomposed remains of Romero G. Gonzalez, a former stasis booth engineer who apparently killed himself (as in, having travelled back in time to kill his past self). Just then, Lister and Cat are knocked unconscious by the real Asclepius, who has gone insane and has mistaken them a kidney donor and recipient.

An asteroid storm in the direct path of the facility is detected, and Rimmer, Kryten, and Snacky search for Lister and Cat so they can quickly escape. They manage to find and stop Asclepius, but in a hail of gunfire exchanged with the deranged robot, destroy the jar containing Lister's kidneys. They make their escape onboard Starbug just as the space station is obliterated by incoming asteroids.

Back on Red Dwarf, Lister is receiving treatment by Kryten due to his lack of kidneys. The two concoct a plan to have Cat "agree" to donate one of his, due to Cat being an inherently selfish creature who refuses to do so otherwise. After successfully swindling Cat, the gang are ready for Snacky to operate, only for Snacky to reveal he is not Asclepius. The crew formulate a plan, however, using Snacky's knowledge of stasis booths, acquired from regularly serving Gonzalez and overhearing his conversations on the subject. The four of them use a stasis booth, now able to time travel to a prior instance onboard Red Dwarf, to knock out the Lister from a couple days prior and take his kidneys, with Kryten installing an "MTK chip" into his bloodstream keeping him alive until after the encounter with Asclepius. They succeed, and return to the present.

== Production ==
"Give & Take" was the first episode filmed during the back-to-back production of both Series XI and XII in November 2015.

== Reception ==
"Give & Take" received positive reviews from critics and fans, with the Red Dwarf fansite Ganymede & Titan ranking it the best episode of Series XI in a public poll in 2018. In a review from Digital Spy, "Give & Take" was said to be the best Red Dwarf episode since "Gunmen of the Apocalypse" from Series VI.
