= Officer Rimmer =

- Red Dwarf episode
- Episode no.: Series 11; Episode 4
- Directed by: Doug Naylor
- Written by: Doug Naylor
- Original air date: 13 October 2016

Guest appearances
- Stephen Critchlow as Captain Herring; Penelope Freeman as Lifts/Gosh Lady; Daniel Barker as Croquet Commentator

Episode chronology
| ← Previous "Give & Take" | Next → "Krysis" |
- Red Dwarf XI

"Officer Rimmer" is the fourth episode of Red Dwarf XI and the 65th in the series run. Originally broadcast on the British television channel Dave on 13 October 2016, it was made available early on 7 October 2016 on UKTV Play.

After accidentally saving a valuable Space Corps starship, Rimmer is promoted to the rank of First Lieutenant and the power quickly goes to his head.

== Synopsis ==
While cruising space onboard Starbug, the crew come across a Space Corps vessel, carrying highly-vulnerable nuclear materials, drifting helplessly toward an asteroid storm. The vessel's captain, bio-printed Edwin Herring (Stephen Critchlow), sends an SOS to the Red Dwarf crew requesting urgent aid or the ship's nuclear stock will cause a massive explosion capable of reaching even Starbug. In an impulsive decision, Rimmer (Chris Barrie) launches a limpet torpedo to obliterate the ship before it can harm Starbug. However, it miraculously ricochets off a lone asteroid and blasts the ship to safety. Herring, in immense gratitude, declares he shall promote Rimmer to the rank of officer, something which Rimmer has always aspired to.

Back on Red Dwarf, Kryten (Robert Llewellyn) attempts to suppress Rimmer's ego over the promotion by reminding him that he was intending to destroy the ship, only for Rimmer to announce that this does not matter, as he is being promoted regardless. Herring arrives, promotes Rimmer to the even more prestigious rank of First Lieutenant, and dematerializes as his mission to captain the ship is complete. Using the bio-printer that produced Herring on the Space Corps ship, Rimmer plans to use it to create a crew of his own to command. Whilst the other three are looking into the bio-printer's files, they are bewildered to discover Lister's DNA on file being used in call centers; Lister (Craig Charles) then recalls once accepting an offer to spit on a stick for 'half a packet of fags' and 'a hundred dollarpounds'. They then delete all available crewmembers from the bio-printer's files. Rimmer, however, manages to scavenge DNA of himself from when he was alive to mass-produce dozens of himself. He also oversees the construction of a new officers' lounge by the Skutters, exclusive to only him and his clones.

Lister and Cat (Danny John-Jules) become fed up with Rimmer's imposed class system, especially since Rimmer uses it to make their lives miserable, and barges into the officers' lounge against his orders. An angry Rimmer gets Kryten to help him create modified versions of himself to act as bodyguards, but due to his impatient and repeated slamming of the print button, jams the bio-printer. After pulling it out, it's revealed the bio-printer has a created a large, grotesque hybrid of several Rimmers bent on a psychotic rampage of absorbing all Rimmers. Rimmer manages to escape, but is forced to resign from his position of First Lieutenant back to Second Technician to receive help from the other three. With Rimmer acting as bait, the other three sneak up on it and distract it long enough for Rimmer to take cover, finally blasting it with bazookoid fire.

== Production ==
The conversation during the opening sequence concerning dreams was originally written and filmed for Cured in Series XII. It was decided during production to reuse it for this episode, and it was reshot so as to have Cat in his correct costume.

The officer uniform adorned by Rimmer was designed after the original "Clive of India" uniform worn by Rimmer in Me², Kryten, and Better Than Life. The Rimmer monster was created as one whole prop, consisting of Chris Barrie and several other performers wearing Rimmer masks. Similarly, Herring had several design concepts made for his deformed head, with the final design deemed the most funny and ultimately chosen for broadcast.

== Reception ==
"Officer Rimmer" received positive reviews by critics and fans, though some expressed disappointment over the suddenness of the ending.
