= Red Dwarf XI =

Series of television

- Starring: Chris Barrie; Craig Charles; Danny John-Jules; Robert Llewellyn
- No. of episodes: 6

Release
- Original network: Dave
- Original release: 22 September – 27 October 2016

Series chronology
- ← Previous; Red Dwarf X Next → Red Dwarf XII

Red Dwarf XI is the eleventh series of the British science fiction sitcom Red Dwarf. It was broadcast on UK television channel Dave in September and October 2016.

The series follows the life of technician Dave Lister (Craig Charles), who is the only survivor of an accident on the spaceship Red Dwarf, and the last survivor of the human race, three million years in the future, and his shipmates, a holographic reproduction of his dead bunkmate and boss, Arnold Rimmer (Chris Barrie), a sapient Cat (Danny John-Jules) who is a result of three million years' evolution and sanitation droid Kryten (Robert Llewellyn).

== Production ==
Red Dwarf X had been the first full series since the revival by Dave, and had been written and directed by Doug Naylor alone, and production company Grant Naylor Productions had made nothing but Red Dwarf for some time. This had proved to be difficult, and so Baby Cow were brought on as an additional production company.

The episodes were recorded at Pinewood Studios in November and December 2015, with the show having moved from its old base at Shepperton. The shooting of series XII, which had been ordered at the same time, followed after the new year.

The transport ship Starbug returned to the show as a set, after having been absent in the previous series. Location filming was done at Fawley Power Station near Southampton for "Give & Take".

== Casting ==
The main cast returned, with Craig Charles leaving his regular role as Lloyd Mullaney in Coronation Street in order to shoot this series.

Guest cast included the actors Kevin Eldon and Lucie Pohl in "Twentica", as a simulant and the underground scientist Harmony de Gauthier respectively, and Maggie Service and Dan Tetsell as two lovers in flashbacks in "Samsara".

The episode "Krysis" features Dominic Coleman as Butler, another mechanoid who Kryten sees as a rival.

== Reception ==
Writing for The List Henry Northmore said that "Old fans won't feel short changed. The cast are obviously incredibly comfortable slipping back into their old characters." but complained about the humour, saying that "The stories are still incredibly clever subversions of sci-fi tropes but the jokes are often clunky. There are some wonderful details like the scientists hustling physics in a prohibition era speakeasy in the first episode or the fun Naylor has with probability in the second. It's just a shame the humour doesn't match the smart scenarios."

SciFiNow gave the Blu-Ray review of the series 3 stars out of 5, saying that "It's a bit wobbly and somewhat inconsistent, but there are some great ideas here, and the chemistry between the cast is as wonderful as ever."

Tom Eames writing for Digital Spy said that they had been "pleasantly surprised with the high quality of Red Dwarf's 11th series on Dave", and that "'Twentica' and 'Officer Rimmer' were the only slight disappointments".

== Episodes ==
No. overall	No. in series	Title	Directed by	Written by	Original release date	Prod. code	Viewers (millions)
62	1	"Twentica"	Doug Naylor	Doug Naylor	22 September 2016	6	1.7
The Red Dwarf team return, visiting an alternative universe on early-20th-century Earth. The crew have to balance being separated and half stranded in a world where modern technology is strictly banned.
63	2	"Samsara"	Doug Naylor	Doug Naylor	29 September 2016	5	1.7
The Red Dwarf team finds an ocean moon and begins to discover all is not as it seems on the ocean floor nor in the ship itself, where a nefarious force exerts its power over them.
64	3	"Give & Take"	Doug Naylor	Doug Naylor	6 October 2016	1	1.3
A derelict-looking ship is boarded, only to find an insane medical droid onboard. The droid harvests Lister's kidneys and leaves him stuck asking the only genetically similar creature available for an organ donation—the group's most selfish member, Cat.
65	4	"Officer Rimmer"	Doug Naylor	Doug Naylor	13 October 2016	4	1.3
Responding to a distress call from a doomed ship, the Red Dwarf crew rescue the only remaining survivor; a bio-printed captain. Rimmer inadvertently saves him from certain death, earning the promotion he had always dreamed of. A bio-printer and a ship full of Rimmers. What could possibly go wrong?
66	5	"Krysis"	Doug Naylor	Doug Naylor	20 October 2016	3	1.3
When Kryten starts acting oddly and suddenly changes his chassis to a burly, Rosso Red the group wonder what's wrong. A robotic midlife crisis is the cause. To cheer up Kryten and prove how far he has come the team take him to see an older droid model named Butler in the hope of showing Kryten how he has evolved. Unfortunately, all is not as it seems and their plan only makes matters worse.
67	6	"Can of Worms"	Doug Naylor	Doug Naylor	27 October 2016	2	1.2
A ship crewed by a single mechanoid mercenary and carrying one hostage is heading towards a black hole. The crew leap to the rescue. Upon rescuing the hostage, the crew discover that she is not all that she appears with dire consequences, especially for a very enamoured Cat.
