= Dear Dave =

- Red Dwarf episode
- Episode no.: Series 10; Episode 5
- Directed by: Doug Naylor
- Written by: Doug Naylor
- Original air date: 1 November 2012

Guest appearances
- Isla Ure as Dispensers 23 & 34

Episode chronology
| ← Previous "Entangled" | Next → "The Beginning" |
- Red Dwarf X

"Dear Dave" is the fifth episode of science fiction sitcom Red Dwarf series X. Originally broadcast on the British television channel Dave on 1 November 2012. Lister receives a letter from an old flame telling him he might have become a father three million years ago, all while finding himself stuck in a love triangle with two vending machines.

== Plot ==
The episode begins with Kryten (Robert Llewellyn) querying as to why Lister (Craig Charles) is so depressed, but he keeps accidentally rubbing in the fact that Lister is the sole human being left alive. While Kryten reassures Lister that he could some day find another species to love, Rimmer (Chris Barrie) suggests that Lister wouldn't know how to charm a woman even if there was one aboard. Lister though finds that he has two rival talking dispensing machines – Snack Dispensers 23 and 34 – vying for his affections. Meanwhile, the ship's on-board computer has accused Rimmer of neglecting his duties (having not reported for work in over three million years) and thus threatens him with demotion, a fact that would relegate him to being on a par with Lister.

A post pod arrives, a fact communicated to the crew by the Cat (Danny John-Jules) through the medium of charades. Lister gets a letter from an old girlfriend telling him she's pregnant and the baby might be his, setting off a hunt through the mountain of letters from the mail pod to discover if Lister might have unknowingly started a family back on Earth. Rimmer donates to the ship's medical service to deter the decision to demote him (getting the money courtesy of the savings made by removing toilet paper from all but a handful of the toilets on the ship), but this fails. Rimmer then tries to find an excuse to have Lister declared insane so it could be argued that the reason he neglected his duties was due to caring for Lister.

Lister makes up with Snack Dispenser 23 by dragging her down a hallway so she can fulfill her lifelong dream of seeing around the corner. They accidentally fall over into a sexually suggestive position, delighting Kryten (who thinks Lister has truly fallen in love) and Rimmer (who can use the incident to prove Lister's insanity). Before Rimmer can write a report, however, Cat (who is desperately looking for some toilet paper) snatches the sheets.

Lister finally finds the letter from his old girlfriend and reassures the others he has made peace with the chance that he had descendants – even though he never knew them, he can take pride in the possibility that a relative of his could have achieved something great. Judging from his reaction upon opening the letter though, it seems the baby wasn't his.

== Production ==
The original plan for the final two episodes of the series was for a plot that would see the reintroduction of Kristine Kochanski. However, production problems meant the plan had to be ditched, and two new episodes were written at short notice. Little more than half of this episode was filmed in front of a live studio audience.

The Rimmer-based subplot was a later addition, as was the vending machine subplot. Some scenes, such as the Subbuteo scene, were filmed even later than that. Eventually the entire episode was shown (with Entangled) at a special screening to provide the necessary laughter track.

== Critical reception ==
Reviews for the fifth episode were somewhat mixed. SFX gave it 3.5 stars out of five and said that the episode had "some classic Red Dwarf moments ... but [was] not a classic episode." Similarly Starburst gave it six stars out of ten, and said that "it's clearly not the most complete of the recent episodes and there was plenty in there which felt like padding, but there was enough good stuff on show too to ensure it kept up the quality of the series." Radio Times liked the episode and said that "Red Dwarf is always at its finest when it jettisons the sci-fi plots and concentrates on Lister's sense of loneliness", and reserved particular praise for Cat's attempt at charades saying that it was "both excruciating and hilarious."
