= Krysis =

- Red Dwarf episode
- Episode no.: Series 11; Episode 5
- Directed by: Doug Naylor
- Written by: Doug Naylor
- Original air date: 20 October 2016

Guest appearances
- Dominic Coleman as Butler; Robert Nairne as GELF Chief; Daniel Barker as The Universe

Episode chronology
← Previous "Officer Rimmer"	Next → "Can of Worms"
- Red Dwarf XI

"Krysis" is the fifth episode of Red Dwarf XI and the 66th in the series run. Originally broadcast on the British television channel Dave on 20 October 2016, it was made available accidentally on 13 October 2016 on UKTV Play, releasing a day earlier than intended.

Kryten becomes depressed, having reached the mid-point of his operational lifespan, and tries to find meaning in life again.

== Synopsis ==
The crew notice Kryten (Robert Llewellyn) seems preoccupied, and when they question him, he reveals he's begun questioning the point of living as the universe will one day die and everything along with it. To try to find some enjoyment, Kryten decks himself in a new Ferrari red shell-casing and gains a sudden interest in bungee jumping. The crew realize Kryten is undergoing a midlife crisis, and to make Kryten feel better about himself, they've plotted a course to a sister ship of the one they rescued Kryten from, the Nova 3, to visit its mechanoid and compare how far Kryten has come since those days.

The crew visit the ship and meet its occupant an earlier model of mechanoid called Butler (Dominic Coleman), who, in the time marooned on the ship, has become a master painter, writer, and historian of the arts. Kryten is greatly embarrassed and envious of Butler's success, and even more so when the crew take Butler for a ride on Starbug, with him quickly defusing a possibly dangerous situation with a fearsome GELF tribe.

After Butler departs, Kryten is left sad once again, however when upgrades to the ship made by Butler appear to have backfired, the crew are forced to land at a nearby station, the S.I.U. (Search for an Intelligent Universe). Proving to be the ship the Nova 3 was originally intended to head towards, the station's mission was to achieve contact and communication with the universe, believing it to be a sentient entity. The crew contact what appears to be the universe using the station's technology (the universe having been put on hold for some millennia), and hand it to Kryten. Kryten, questioning it on the meaning of life, manages to throw the universe into a midlife crisis due to its own lifespan being at its halfway point. However, Kryten reasons that love is the answer to the question, as they know it exists and if it does, life has meaning. The crew head back to Red Dwarf, with Kryten contacting Butler on the way. Intending to gloat over their meeting the universe, Butler reveals he intentionally tinkered Starbug to land at the station, and claiming to be friends with the universe, driving Kryten crazy with jealousy.

== Reception ==
"Krysis" received positive reviews from critics but more of a mixed response from fans. Writing for Red Dwarf fansite, Ganymede and Titan, Jonathan Capps wrote that "At its core it's a funny and tremendously enjoyable half hour, with one of the best guest stars in years, an excellent central performance by Robert Llewellyn and the consistently funny dialogue that I've come to expect from this series. Unfortunately, it's let down by a plot that failed to convincingly set up or conclude the central premise, and an ending that did not even come close to justifying the drastic tonal shift that it contained."

Tom Eames of Digital Spy preferred "Krysis" over prior episode Officer Rimmer, writing, "This was a very fun and sci-fi-rich episode, with Kryten himself, Robert Llewellyn, in particular in top form. It may not have been filmed in this order, but you can feel the cast get into the swing of it all by this point, and this episode can sit proudly among the very best." Writing for Cultbox, Sophie Davies was letdown by the latter half of the episode, "The final act of 'Krysis' is where it falls a little bit flat for me. After just a short amount of time spent with Butler, he's whisked away and the crew end up meeting 'the universe' voiced by a Morgan Freeman soundalike. This results in a rather strange, inconsequential scene that seems as if it would be more at home in Futurama than Red Dwarf."
