= Dimension Jump =

Dimension Jump may refer to:

- "Dimension Jump" (Red Dwarf episode), an episode of the British television sitcom Red Dwarf
- Dimension Jump (convention), convention organised by the official Red Dwarf fan club
