= Entangled (Red Dwarf) =

- Red Dwarf episode
- Episode no.: Series 10; Episode 4
- Directed by: Doug Naylor
- Written by: Doug Naylor
- Original air date: 25 October 2012

Guest appearances
- Steven Wickham as BEGG Chief; Peter Elliot as Chimp; Sydney Stevenson as Professor Edgington; Emma Campbell-Jones as TV Character 1; Nick Barber as TV Character 2

Episode chronology
← Previous "Lemons"	Next → "Dear Dave"
- Red Dwarf X

"Entangled" is the fourth episode of science fiction sitcom Red Dwarf series X, originally broadcast on the British television channel Dave on 25 October 2012. Lister loses Rimmer in a game of poker to a group of "biologically engineered garbage gobblers", and in return gets an unwanted gift: a groinal exploder programmed to detonate in 24 hours unless Lister pays his debts. Meanwhile, Kryten and Cat become quantum entangled and do everything in perfect unison.

== Plot ==
While chasing a space weevil, Cat (Danny John-Jules) encounters Kryten (Robert Llewellyn) conducting an experiment with the quantum rod from "Trojan". It unexpectedly causes the two of them to become 'quantum entangled', meaning they are more prone to coincidences such as saying the same thing at exactly the same time, especially when emotionally stressed.

Meanwhile, Rimmer (Chris Barrie) comes up with a complicated new accident reporting system, involving filling out a form several pages long, which frustrates Lister (Craig Charles). Lister discovers a moon with signs of life and heads down in Starbug, hoping to find out if his former lover Kochanski passed this way. Much later he returns – minus Starbug. He explains that he played poker with some GELFs known as BEGGs (biologically engineered garbage gobblers) and lost Starbug, as well as Rimmer. Also, the BEGGs have outfitted him with an explosive device attached to his groin that will explode if he does not pay up.

An offer of an alternative deal goes nowhere and another poker game is proposed. Unfortunately, Kryten and Cat's quantum entanglement combines with a stressed Lister's insistence that he does not 'choke' in poker games and causes the BEGGs to choke to death. Hoping to use the quantum entanglement to save his life, Lister gets Cat stressed (by cutting off locks of his hair) and the Dwarfers learn some space co-ordinates that lead them to a space station that Kryten recognises as a science institution that was staffed by scientists who were always wrong. Investigating the station's stasis pods, they discover that one is still functional and contains a professor, Irene Edgington – who turns out to be a chimp because an evolution device she invented went wrong.

The Dwarfers take Edgington back to the ship and use her device to make her human again. She tells them how to remove the device, but they have to do the opposite of everything she suggests because all her instructions (excluding the last one) are incorrect. After saving Lister, Edgington takes a walk with Rimmer (who she seems to like) and ends up accidentally trapped in an airlock. She presses the wrong button and is ejected into space. Lister gives Rimmer the accident report forms to fill in.

== Production ==
The episode was subject to on-set rewrites when it emerged that there were rules and regulations which governed how long performer Peter Elliott could play the role of the chimp without taking a break. The ending originally planned for the episode would have seen Rimmer and Lister bickering like a divorced couple over looking after the chimp . The character of Professor Edgington (played by Sydney Stevenson) was a late addition to the story. The legs of Professor Edgington were actually a model as the actress playing the part was yet to be cast. These problems meant that the final five minutes of the episode were not filmed in front of a live studio audience – the entire episode was later shown (with "Dear Dave") at a special screening to provide the necessary laughter track for the final part.

The BEGG chief was played by Steven Wickham, who, nineteen years earlier, had played Lister's GELF bride in "Emohawk: Polymorph II".

== Critical reception ==
Reviews for the fourth episode were positive. SFX gave it four stars out of five, stating that it was "another cracking episode absolutely filled with comedy gems ... the gag rate is so fast you're in danger of whiplash, and the barmy central plot twists and turns so much you never know [what] bizarre situation you're going to witness next." Radio Times called it "a smart, inventive episode," and reserved particular praise for the skill of Danny John-Jules (Cat) and Robert Llewellyn (Kryten) "who, as a result of a quantum entanglement, have to deliver their lines in perfect unison." IGN awarded the episode 7.2 out of ten, stating that although the pace was "a little pedestrian at times," there was "enough smart plotting and good gags to ensure it maintains the high standard of this 10th season." Starburst gave it eight stars out of ten, and called it "the best episode of the series since the opener "Trojan" and said that "the whole idea of having the crew go off on an adventure, meet strange life forms and at the last minute figure a way out of a tricky situation with some absurd logic, really gives the proceedings a classic Dwarf feel."
