= Mr Pye (TV series) =

- Genre: Drama; Fantasy; Comedy
- Based on: Mr Pye by Mervyn Peake
- Screenplay by: David Hare
- Directed by: Michael Darlow
- Starring: Derek Jacobi; Judy Parfitt; Betty Marsden; Richard O'Callaghan; Robin McCaffrey; Patricia Hayes
- Composer: Mark Warman
- Country of origin: United Kingdom
- Original language: English
- No. of series: 1
- No. of episodes: 4

Production
- Cinematography: Nick Gifford
- Running time: 50 minutes
- Production company: Landseer Productions

Original release
- Network: Channel 4
- Release: 2 March – 23 March 1986

Mr Pye is a Channel 4 television series written by Donald Churchill, based on the 1953 short novel Mr Pye by Mervyn Peake, and directed by Michael Darlow. Broadcast began on 2 March 1986 in the United Kingdom.

== Plot ==
Mr. Pye travels to the Channel Island of Sark to preach the word of God. Pye does good works and he discovers that he has started to grow angel's wings, and after consulting with a Harley Street doctor, he decides to stop doing good deeds, and instead does bad deeds. He engages in some deliberately malicious acts, and after a while this results in him growing horns on his forehead. He is unable to decide what to do, but eventually decides to reveal his horned condition to the islanders, who chase him to the edge of a cliff, which Pye flies off using his wings.

== Cast ==
- Derek Jacobi as Mr Pye
- Judy Parfitt as Miss Dredger
- Betty Marsden as Miss George
- Richard O'Callaghan as Thorpe
- Robin McCaffrey as Tanty
- Patricia Hayes as Kaka

== Production ==
The series was filmed on Sark island itself, the setting of the book.

== Episodes ==
No.	Title	Directed by	Written by	Original release date
1	"Preparing the Way"	Michael Darlow	Donald Churchill	2 March 1986
2	"The First Martyr"	Michael Darlow	Donald Churchill	9 March 1986
3	"The Perjured Soul"	Michael Darlow	Donald Churchill	16 March 1986
4	"Made for the Moonlight"	Michael Darlow	Donald Churchill	23 March 1986
