= Lemons (Red Dwarf) =

- Red Dwarf episode
- Episode no.: Series 10; Episode 3
- Directed by: Doug Naylor
- Written by: Doug Naylor
- Original air date: 18 October 2012

Guest appearances
- James Baxter as Jesus of Caesarea; Indira Joshi as Erin; Nicholas Richards as Uncle Aaron; Tom Pepper as Man Who May Be Jesus & Judas; Hormuzd Todiwala as Waiter

Episode chronology
← Previous "Fathers & Suns"	Next → "Entangled"
- Red Dwarf X

"Lemons" is the third episode of science fiction sitcom Red Dwarf series X, originally broadcast on the British television channel Dave on 18 October 2012. In the episode, the crew are marooned on Earth in 23 AD, where they meet a peace-loving do-gooder called Jesus.

== Plot ==
After attempting to assemble a Swedish flat-pack "rejuvenation shower", the crew are unexpectedly shot back to Earth, Britain, in AD 23 when the rays of the sun hit them accidentally. The Dwarfers need an 8-volt battery to power up their Returner Remote and get home. Remembering a lesson from school, Rimmer (Chris Barrie) suggests that they make a battery out of potatoes. When Kryten (Robert Llewellyn) points out that Britain in 23 AD has no potatoes, Rimmer suggests making a battery out of lemons, but the nearest lemons are in India, 4,000 miles away.

Their journey leads them to a crowded market square in India, where they run into a peace-loving do-gooder called Jesus (James Baxter). Rimmer is particularly excited about meeting him, as Rimmer has the middle name Judas; when the others question why Rimmer would be given such a negative name, Rimmer explains that his mother belonged to the "Church of Judas", who believe that Judas was Jesus' twin brother and took his place at the Crucifixion, thus allowing Jesus to return after his apparent death. The Dwarfers end up befriending the stranger and eventually wind up back on the ship with the apparent son of God in tow when escaping Romans.

Whilst recovering from a kidney stone removal by the whole Red Dwarf crew, Jesus gets a preview of what he believes to be his status as the central figure of Christianity and is horrified by the number of wars to be waged in his name. Jesus returns to Earth and proceeds to rant against the Ten Commandments, in an attempt to damage his reputation and thus avoid his fate. In a final twist, however, it turns out he is not Jesus of Nazareth, but rather "Jesus of Caesarea", and thus not the son of God at all. Lister (Craig Charles) advises him to use what he saw in the future to make something of his life – so Jesus starts making and selling bags.

While briefly delaying their return to the future so Lister can have a curry, the Dwarfers spot two twin brothers going by the names of Jesus and Judas. Rimmer goes to get up, only to be shouted at by the others and told to "stay put."

== Production ==
This was the only episode in Series X to include location filming – the forest scenes were shot in the back-lot of Shepperton Studios.

This episode was Chris Barrie and Robert Llewellyn's favourite episode of the series.

The lemon battery actually did work, and delivered 8 volts of electricity.

== Critical reception ==
Reception for the third episode were mixed. SFX gave it three stars out of five, stating that the episode "has its moments, and the four main stars are on top form again (especially Chris Barrie who could make comedy gold out of Rimmer reading 50 Shades of Grey out loud) but overall the episode feels a little formulaic and a missed opportunity. But again, it may have felt that way because we've been spoilt so far." Starburst gave it six stars out of ten, and said that the episode "had enough quality moments to ensure that the series maintained its winning streak thus far, even if it wasn't an instant classic." IGN was more positive, awarding the episode 8.5 out of ten, calling it "classic Dwarf, with a ridiculous plot and some great gags. But perhaps the greatest quality of the episode is the chemistry of the four main characters."
