= Trojan (Red Dwarf) =

- Red Dwarf episode
- Episode no.: Series 10; Episode 1
- Directed by: Doug Naylor
- Written by: Doug Naylor
- Original air date: 4 October 2012

Guest appearances
- Mark Dexter as Howard Rimmer; Susan Earl as Sim. Crawford; Lucy Newman-Williams as All Droid Jayne / Phone Droid Voice; Bryan Bounds as All Droid Bob / Phone Droid Voice; Laurence Bouvard as Phone Droid Voice; Rupert Degas as Phone Droid Voice

Episode chronology
← Previous "Back to Earth"	Next → "Fathers & Suns"
- Red Dwarf X

"Trojan" is the first episode of science fiction sitcom Red Dwarf series X. Originally broadcast on the British television channel Dave on 4 October 2012, it marked the return of Red Dwarf to a regular series run, 13 years after the conclusion of series 8. The episode touches upon Rimmer's relationship with his brothers and his urge to become an officer, following the discovery of a hologram of his brother Howard.

== Plot ==
Lister (Craig Charles) and the Cat (Danny John-Jules) are tricked into attempting to buy a useless drinks stirring device from an automated telemarketing system, "All-Droid". Meanwhile, Rimmer (Chris Barrie) has once again failed to pass his astro-navigation test, and has not become an officer like his three brothers. At that moment, the crew discover a derelict "Quantum Twister" ship, SS Trojan, which is driven by a "quantum rod". While messing with the rod, Rimmer inadvertently summons a ship which carries a hologram of his brother Howard (Mark Dexter). Despite Howard's ship being in dire trouble, Rimmer opts to try to pass another exam to become an officer, and match his brother, before rescuing him.

Rimmer's attempts to revise for a further exam go badly, and after the other three crew members best him in a question about moose-related car accidents in the 1970s Sweden, Rimmer's light bee crashes due to a buildup of "resentment". Kryten (Robert Llewellyn) manages to restart it by "purging" his resentment, but since he is out of time to sit an exam, he decides to lie to his brother instead.

Rimmer and the other members of the crew dress up in Space Corps uniforms and welcome Howard aboard Trojan, with Rimmer posing as the ship's captain. Howard is accompanied by a simulant, Crawford (Susan Earl), and is dumbfounded that his brother appears to be a successful officer. After a tour of the ship, Howard becomes increasingly jealous of Rimmer and crashes due to a buildup of resentment, as Rimmer had earlier. After Howard's resentment is purged, Crawford reveals herself to be a simulant rebel, and intends to shoot everyone on board to free herself from human servitude. At this moment Lister finally manages to get through to a sales representative for All-Droid after days of being put on hold. Frustrated, Lister reaches for the phone, prompting Crawford to shoot; the shot misses Lister and instead heads for Rimmer. Howard places himself between Rimmer and Crawford, mortally wounding himself. Crawford is defeated by Kryten and the Cat, who upload Howard's resentment into her, causing her to crash. Howard, dying of his injuries, reconciles with Rimmer and admits that he wasn't an officer as was thought; like Rimmer, he was merely a vending machine repairman. Rimmer does not reciprocate the gesture, and merely reduces the size of his lie slightly (claiming that he had one fewer car than he had bragged, but was still wildly successful).

Later on, on board Red Dwarf, Lister has re-purposed Crawford's body as a drink-stirring machine, and Rimmer is smugly satisfied that his brother died a low-ranking repairman after years of picking on his younger brother. But the computer system is updated with news of Howard's death, and due to his bravery, Howard is posthumously awarded the Platinum Star of Fortitude, with the recommendation that Red Dwarf be renamed S.S. Howard Rimmer. Rimmer suffers another resentment-fueled crash.

== Production ==
This original title for this episode was "Slow Rescue" but it was changed when it was realised that it was not a dynamic title for a new series.

The episode was dedicated to the memory of Jo Howard (Production Manager for Series VII; Line Producer for Series VIII; and Producer for Back to Earth).

== Cultural references ==

The high level of moose collisions in Sweden is well-documented. An increase in both moose and car numbers in the 1970s brought a substantial increase in moose-related accidents, peaking in 1980 when about 6000 moose vehicle collisions occurred.

Howard's claim that Rimmer's brain is "smaller than the salad section in a Scottish supermarket" refers to the notorious Scottish diet which is widely seen as one of the worst in the world.

In the final moments of the episode, after reading that Red Dwarf is to be renamed, Lister says he'll 'go and get me paintbrush'. This is a reference to the opening credits of Series 1 and 2, where Lister is seen using a paintbrush to paint the 'Red Dwarf' name on the side of the ship.

== Ratings ==
The episode was watched by 1.976 million viewers. When added to the repeat airings over the following two days, then the number of viewers rose to nearly 3.3 million people.

== Critical reception ==
The episode received generally positive reviews, Michael Hogan writing for The Telegraph said it was "no classic but largely a return to form", giving the episode 3.5 stars out of 5. SFX magazine gave it 4 stars out of 5 saying "Trojan was clever enough to be bloody good, but with room for improvement. And you know what? There's every reason to believe that this series can get better." "What Culture" gave it 5 stars out of 5 saying "If this episode is any indication of what we can look forward to for the rest of the series, I am a very happy person indeed. Red Dwarf is back, and I couldn't be happier!" Starburst magazine gave it 8 stars out of 10, and said that "writer/director Doug Naylor has rekindled the winning formula and produced an extremely promising opening episode." Radio Times called it "a lively re-creation of the show as we most fondly remember it," whilst the Shropshire Star said "it is indeed good to see the boys back in town, occupying a galaxy with infinite possibilities and spreading joy on whichever planet they land."
