= Simon Treves =

English actor, director and writer

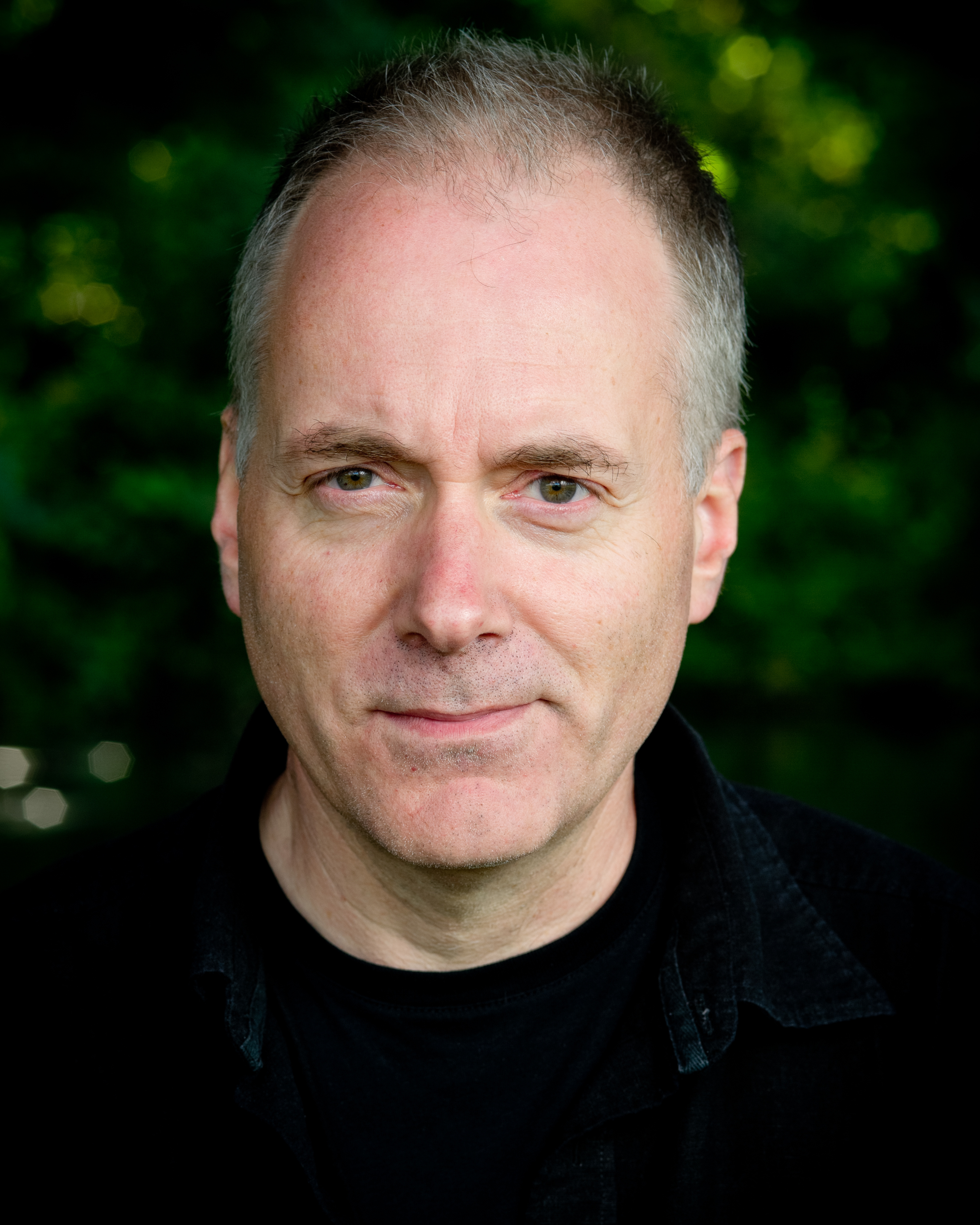
- Treves in 2010
- Born: Frederick Simon Treves; 19 June 1957 (age 68); Watford, England
- Spouse: Mirela Kalicanin (m. 2001)
- Children: 2
- Parent: Frederick Treves (father)

Frederick Simon Treves (born 19 June 1957) is a retired English actor, director and writer, best known for playing Harold 'Stinker' Pinker in three series of ITV's Jeeves and Wooster. In 2018 he played Aleister Crowley in the short film Boca do Inferno, directed by Luis Porto and shot in Porto and Cascais, Portugal.

== Biography ==
Born 19 June 1957 in Watford, Hertfordshire, England, Treves is the eldest son of actor Frederick Treves and the great-great nephew of Sir Frederick Treves, the surgeon who treated Joseph Merrick, the Elephant Man.

Educated first at Rokeby School, then King's College School in Wimbledon and finally Birkbeck, University of London, he trained as an actor at the National Youth Theatre and the Bristol Old Vic Theatre School.

=== Theatre ===
As an actor, he played at many of the leading regional British theatres. He made his debut with the RSC at Stratford in 1983, and returned in 1986 to play Joey Percival in Shaw's Misalliance at the Barbican.

Anthony Hopkins cast him as Willy Nilly in his production of Under Milk Wood for the official opening of the AIR Studios at Lyndhurst Hall, Hampstead in 1992, in aid of The Prince's Trust. Hopkins then asked Simon to personally assist him on his film and theatre productions of August, an adaptation of Anton Chekhov's Uncle Vanya, moved to North Wales. At the Orange Tree, Richmond, he starred as schizophrenic Victorian artist Louis Wain in Jane Coles' Cat with Green Violin. He played De Brie in the original 1992 UK production of David Hirson's multi award-winning La Bête and Bassanes in John Ford's The Broken Heart, both at the Lyric Hammersmith.

In 1999, Treves led the Singapore Repertory Theatre company production of M. Butterfly as Gallimard.

In 2008, he played Richard Greatham in Hay Fever at Manchester Royal Exchange.

=== Television ===
On TV, Treves played Harold 'Stinker' Pinker in three series of Jeeves and Wooster, starring Hugh Laurie and Stephen Fry. His other TV appearances include The Reckoning, Unforgotten, This England, The Girl Before, Life, Black Earth Rising, Next of Kin, Stan Lee's Lucky Man, The Interceptor, EastEnders, Doctors, Red Dwarf X (episode The Beginning), Lynda La Plante's Above Suspicion: Silent Scream, Bodily Harm and Charles II: The Power and The Passion, Soldier Soldier, Boon and By the Sword Divided (as Charles II). As a child he appeared with his younger brother Patrick on the Christmas 1967 edition of Crackerjack.

=== Radio ===
Treves acted in over one hundred radio productions for the BBC after his debut as Joseph Conrad's Lord Jim in 1985, and was a member of the Radio Drama Company from 1989 to 1991 and again in 2007–2008. Much of his work was with award-winning radio producer Dirk Maggs, including Independence Day UK, The Amazing Spider-Man, The Adventures of Superman, The Gemini Apes and The Adventures of Sexton Blake.

In the early 1980s, he regularly voiced trails for one of the first UK breakfast TV channels, TV-am. Other voice-over work was for Channel 4's Right to Reply, BBC One and numerous radio, film and commercial companies. He also voices a character on the computer game, Broken Sword: The Sleeping Dragon.

=== Writing ===
His play Bitter with a Twist was produced by the Bristol Old Vic in 1999, and is published by Faber & Faber. It received its European premiere in Amsterdam in May 2011. Other commissions include two linked internet audio dramas – Ash and Gold, for totallyword.com; and an original short screenplay, Tweeny, commissioned by Brian Cox and Skreba Films. He wrote and directed Smile for Miniaturists 24 at the Arcola; and devised and scripted Neither Here nor There, a celebration of cult Scottish comic Chic Murray, broadcast on BBC Radio 2 in August 2007.

=== Directing ===
Treves was awarded a Master of Fine Arts (MFA) in Theatre Directing from Birkbeck, University of London in 2005, and directed the stage premiere of the original one-act television version of Terry Johnson & Kate Lock's Tuesday's Child at Hampstead Theatre in 2005.

=== Personal life ===
A 1991 cartoon by Simon Treves

Treves married Mirela (née Kalicanin) in 2001 and lives in Buckinghamshire. They have two sons.
