= Fathers & Suns =

- Red Dwarf episode
- Episode no.: Series 10; Episode 2
- Directed by: Doug Naylor
- Written by: Doug Naylor
- Original air date: 11 October 2012

Guest appearances
- Rebecca Blackstone as Pree; Kerry Shale as Medibot/Taiwan Tony

Episode chronology
← Previous "Trojan"	Next → "Lemons"
- Red Dwarf X

"Fathers & Suns" is the second episode of science fiction sitcom Red Dwarf series X, originally broadcast on the British television channel Dave on 11 October 2012.

Lister celebrates the fact that he is his own father by sending a message to himself for Father's Day. This involves scolding himself for being a useless son, and resigning from the ship's crew to force himself to get his act together. Meanwhile Rimmer and Kryten install a new computer personality called Pree.

== Plot ==
The episode begins with Dave Lister (Craig Charles) playing video games. Arnold Rimmer (Chris Barrie) walks in and sees a Father's Day card that Lister's making for himself. Lister explains that every year, he sends himself a Father's Day card to celebrate the fact that he is his own father, but deliberately gets so drunk that when Kryten (Robert Llewellyn) delivers it on Father's Day the following year, he doesn't remember writing it. When Rimmer points out he's been a lousy father to himself, Lister decides to do something about it. The ship's Medibot (Kerry Shale), not understanding Lister is his own father, advises a tough love approach, and also sets up a medical record for "Dave Lister Jr." Lister wakes hungover in the morning to find a drunken video message left by his "dad", in which he tries to use tough love to get his "son" to improve himself.

Meanwhile, Rimmer and Kryten install a new computer, Pree (Rebecca Blackstone), who is so advanced she can predict entire conversations, rendering them unnecessary. When asked by Rimmer to fix a number of faults with Red Dwarf, Pree anticipates that Rimmer would make errors in ordering repairs, and so trashes the corridors, as he would have unwittingly ordered her to.

Lister is horrified to discover that, while drunk, he resigned from his job as part of his self-improvement kick, and Pree now intends to terminate his shipboard privileges - including oxygen. Lister flees, and only just manages to don a spacesuit before Pree opens an airlock and shoots him into space. Since Lister is no longer crew, Pree concludes the ship has no mission, and, citing anti-pollution protocols, locks Red Dwarf on a suicide course into the nearest sun.

Lister manages to return to Red Dwarf and joins the others in trying to shut down Pree, but they end up being attacked by Garbage-bots. At the last minute, Lister uses Pree's own logic against her - arguing that he is Dave Lister Jr. (as proved by the medical record) and that it was Dave Lister Snr. who quit. Therefore, the ship's mission is still valid and, as Lister intends to uninstall her, Pree should anticipate this and shut herself down. She obliges.

Safe once more, Lister is presented with the various freebies that are given to new registered crewmen by Kryten and politely turns them down, citing that he needs to study for the Robotics Training Programme he's applied to. Upon discovering one of the freebies is a new video game, though, Lister rapidly forgets about studying.

== Production ==
With its complex plot twists, this episode was briefly considered as a possible alternative opener for the series.

Craig Charles had flu during the recording of this episode, which helped make the hangover scenes look more realistic.

== Cultural references ==
The title of the episode alludes to the 1862 novel Fathers and Sons by Ivan Turgenev.

Lister learned in "Ouroboros" (Series VII) that he was his own dad and his mum was Kristine Kochanski.

When Rimmer and Kryten initialise Pree, the start-up sequence for SUSE Linux Enterprise Desktop can be seen running in the background.

Rimmer and Kryten mention Holly before they start up Pree. Holly was last seen in Series VIII episode "Only the Good..." and they mentioned Holly was offline due to water damage in Back to Earth after Lister had left a bath running for nine years and the Skutters hadn't dried him out.

The voice of Taiwan Tony and his phrase "it very strange question" is based on the British spoof Japanese game show Banzai.

== Critical reception ==
Reviews for the second episode were generally positive. SFX gave it four stars out of five, stating: "So, Red Dwarf. It's still still got it." Starburst gave it seven stars out of ten, and said that the episode "didn't quite live up to the high standards set by last week's series opener but it was still a thoroughly enjoyable outing and a promising continuation of the series. Radio Times, however, called it "a slightly baggier, flabbier episode than last week's series opener, with a couple of set-pieces that outstay their welcome."
