= Dimension Jump (convention) =

Dimension Jump (DJ) - The Official Red Dwarf Fan Club convention
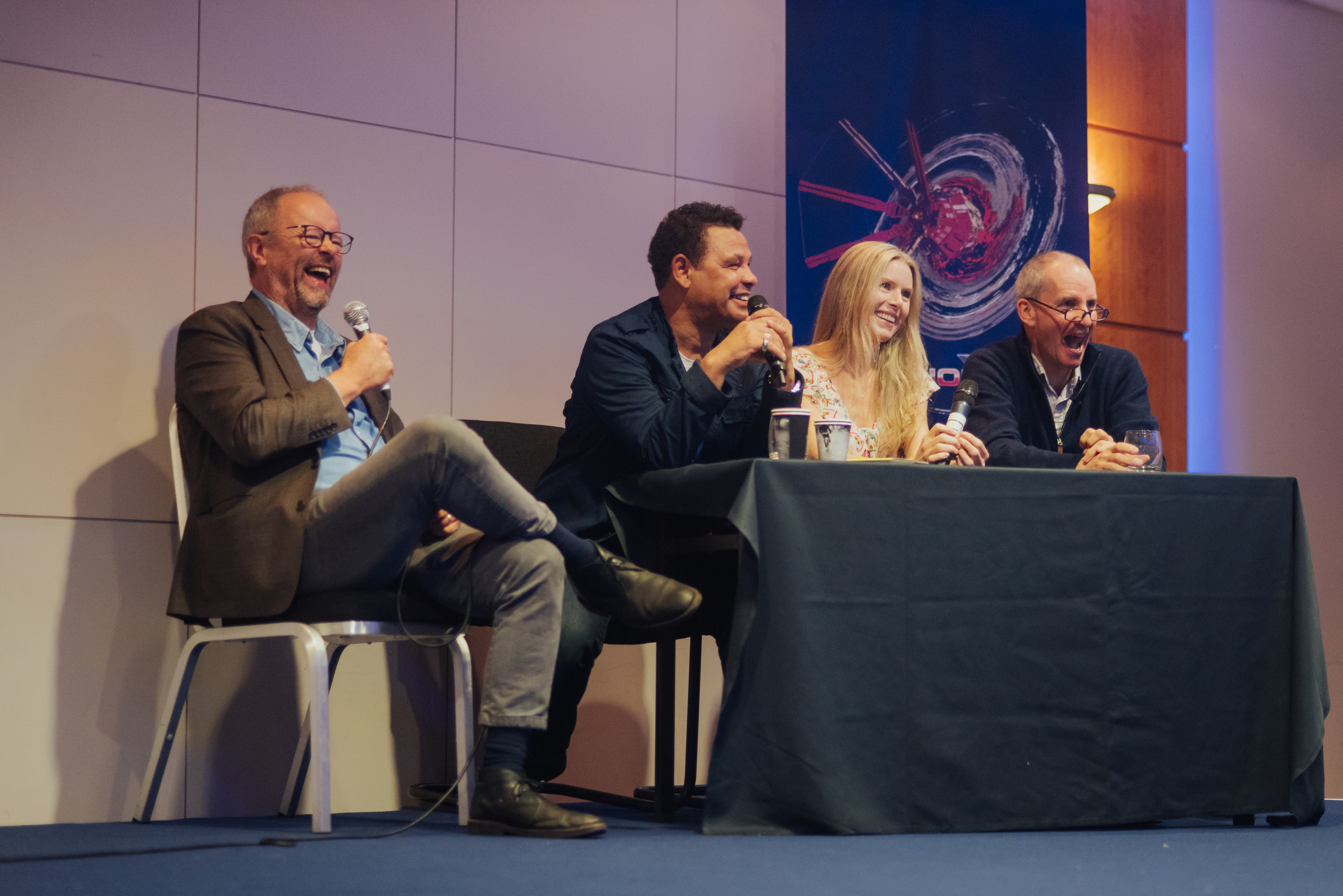
- Robert Llewellyn, Craig Charles, Chloe Annett and Chris Barrie at Dimension Jump XX
- Status: Active
- Genre: Red Dwarf
- Venue: Crowne Plaza Nottingham
- Location: Nottingham
- Country: United Kingdom
- Inaugurated: 1992
- Most recent: 2021
- Attendance: Approx. 400
- Organizer: The Official Red Dwarf Fan Club (TORDFC)
- Website: TORDFC's Dimension Jump website

Dimension Jump is a roughly biennial convention organised by the official Red Dwarf fan club. Special guests typically include main and guest cast from the cult-favourite British television series as well as the show's co-creators and members of the production team.

The most recent convention, Dimension Jump XXI, was held at the Crowne Plaza Nottingham from 10 to 12 September 2021.

The date and location of the next convention has yet to be announced.

== Past conventions ==
Name	Date(s)	Location	Guests	Notes	Fan Attendance
Dimension Jump XXI	10–12 September 2021	Crowne Plaza Nottingham, UK.	Danny John-Jules, Hattie Hayridge, Norman Lovett, Ray Fearon, Lee Cornes, Ian Boldsworth, Johnny Vegas, Rob Grant, Paul Jackson, Matthew Clark. Chris Barrie and Robert Llewellyn appeared live via Zoom.	Due to the 2019-2020 Coronavirus Pandemic, Dimension Jump XXI was moved to 10–12 September 2021.	
Dimension Jump XX	5–7 October 2018	Crowne Plaza Nottingham, UK.	Chris Barrie, Robert Llewellyn, Danny John-Jules, Hattie Hayridge, Craig Charles, Doug Naylor, Rob Grant (his first appearance in twenty-two years), Norman Lovett, Chloë Annett (her first appearance in nine years), Ed Bye, Paul Jackson, Mac McDonald, Ian Boldsworth, Tony Slattery.		
Dimension Jump XIX	7–9 April 2017	Crowne Plaza Nottingham, UK.	Chris Barrie, Robert Llewellyn, Danny John-Jules, Hattie Hayridge, Mark Dexter, Lucie Pohl, Suanne Braun, Stephen Critchlow.		398.
Dimension Jump XVIII	1–3 May 2015	Crowne Plaza Nottingham, UK.	Chris Barrie, Robert Llewellyn, Danny John-Jules, Hattie Hayridge, Mac McDonald, Gordon Kennedy, The Shend, Doug Naylor.	Red Dwarf co-creator Doug Naylor exclusively announced Series XI and XII at the 2015 Dimension Jump event.	375.
Dimension Jump XVII	3–5 May 2013	Birmingham Holiday Inn, UK.	Chris Barrie, Robert Llewellyn, Danny John-Jules, Hattie Hayridge, Craig Charles, Doug Naylor. Tony Hawks also made his first appearance.		365.
Dimension Jump XVI	8–10 April 2011	Birmingham Holiday Inn, UK.	Hattie Hayridge, Robert Llewellyn (via video-link), Chris Barrie, Doug Naylor, Craig Charles, Danny John-Jules.		354.
Dimension Jump XV	9–11 October 2009	Birmingham Holiday Inn, UK	Hattie Hayridge, Chris Barrie, Robert Llewellyn, Danny John-Jules, Chloë Annett, Craig Charles, Richard O’Callaghan.	The convention featured a "Back to Earth"-inspired theme.	356.
Dimension Jump XIV	22–24 September 2007	Moat House Hotel in Peterborough, UK.	Hattie Hayridge, Chris Barrie, Robert Llewellyn, Danny John-Jules.	The convention featured a "Gunmen of the Apocalypse" episode-based Western theme.	123.
Dimension Jump XIII	24–26 September 2006	Moat House Hotel in Peterborough, UK.	Craig Charles (marking the first time in eight years that he had made an appearance at Dimension Jump.) Chris Barrie, Robert Llewellyn, Danny John-Jules, Norman Lovett, and Hattie Hayridge.		214.
Dimension Jump XII	26–28 August 2005	Moat House Hotel in Peterborough, UK.	Danny John-Jules, Chris Barrie, Norman Lovett, Chloë Annett.		168.
Dimension Jump XI	11–13 June 2004	Hotel Park Inn Bedford in Bedford, UK	Chris Barrie, Robert Llewellyn, Danny John-Jules, Hattie Hayridge.	The 2004 Dimension Jump event made news when a letter from Red Dwarf co-creator Doug Naylor was read to the attendees detailing the reasons that a then-anticipated theatrical version of the series had fallen through.	194.
Dimension Jump X	4–6 April 2003	Royal Court Hotel in Coventry, UK.	Chloë Annett, Chris Barrie, Danny John-Jules, Hattie Hayridge, Robert Llewellyn, Norman Lovett and Lee Cornes.		215.
Dimension Jump IX	22–24 March 2002	Royal Court Hotel in Coventry, UK.	Mac McDonald, Chris Barrie, Danny John-Jules, Chloë Annett, Robert Llewellyn, Lee Cornes, Graham McTavish.		261
Dimension Jump 2K	10–12 November 2000	Heathrow Park Hotel.	Mac McDonald, Hattie Hayridge, Danny John-Jules, Robert Llewellyn, Norman Lovett, Chris Barrie, Chloë Annett, Ed Bye, and Doug Naylor. Former Talkie Toaster John Lenahan also made an appearance.		Approx. 350.
Dimension Jump '98	30 October – 1 November 1998	Britannia Adelphi Hotel in Liverpool	Craig Charles, Chris Barrie, Robert Llewellyn, Danny John Jules, Hattie Hayridge, Norman Lovett, and Chloë Annett.	This convention was dedicated to Red Dwarf's 10th Anniversary	600. Biggest DJ in its history.
Dimension Jump '97	6–8 September 1997	The Hanover Hotel in Daventry.	Doug Naylor, Craig Charles, Robert Llewellyn, Danny John Jules, Norman Lovett, Hattie Hayridge, Chris Barrie, and Chloë Annett.	Both Chris Barrie and Chloë Annett made their convention debuts.	Approx. 500.
Dimension Jump '96	30 August – 1 September 1996	The Hanover Hotel in Daventry.	Rob Grant, Hattie Hayridge, Danny John Jules, and Craig Charles.		Approx. 400.
Dimension Jump '95	8–10 September 1995	The Ramada Hotel, Gatwick.	Doug Naylor, Craig Charles, Norman Lovett, Robert Llewellyn, Danny John-Jules, and Hattie Hayridge.		
Dimension Jump '94	22–24 July 1994	Angel Hotel, Northampton.			
Dimension Jump '93	2–4 July 1993	Parker's Hotel, Manchester	Norman Lovett, Danny John-Jules, Rob Grant and Doug Naylor.	The convention featured the last dual appearance of Grant and Naylor (until 2018).	Approx. 200
Dimension Jump '92	17–19 July 1992	Angel Hotel, Northampton	Rob Grant, Doug Naylor and Hattie Hayridge	This was the first convention	Approx. 100–150.
