= The Beginning (Red Dwarf) =

- Red Dwarf episode
- Episode no.: Series 10; Episode 6
- Directed by: Doug Naylor
- Written by: Doug Naylor
- Original air date: 8 November 2012

Guest appearances
- Richard O'Callaghan as Hogey the Roguey; Gary Cady as Dominator Zlurth; Alex Hardy as Chancellor Wednesday; Colin Hoult as Chancellor Thursday; Simon Treves as Lecturer Rimmer; Taylor James as Big Simulant Advisor; Philip Labey as Young Rimmer; Joanne Gale as Wendy

Episode chronology
| ← Previous "Dear Dave" | Next → "Twentica" |
- Red Dwarf X

"The Beginning" is the sixth episode of science fiction sitcom Red Dwarf series X, originally broadcast on the British television channel Dave on 8 November 2012. The crew are attacked by Simulants, and in desperation are forced to rely on Rimmer to save them.

== Plot ==
The episode opens during Rimmer's childhood. He is a student at a college on Io, and his father is the teacher. Rimmer's father (Simon Treves) uses the unwitting young Arnold (Philip Labey) as a guinea pig. He has prepped the students to make Arnold feel unsure of his decisions, and then he humiliates him when he gets them wrong.

Three million years later, aboard Red Dwarf, Rimmer (Chris Barrie) and the others are visited – apparently yet again – by a dim-witted rogue droid named Hogey (Richard O'Callaghan), who is constantly challenging them to duels across time and space due to boredom. While Lister and Rimmer attempt to talk him into a simpler competition, Hogey reveals he has stolen a map of all the wormholes and derelicts in the galaxy from a Simulant Death Ship. Unfortunately, the Simulants have followed him, and they dispatch three Annihilators to attack Red Dwarf. The hull outside the sleeping quarters is breached, and the ensuing decompression pulls Hogey against the hole, sealing it. The Dwarfers abandon him, but Lister takes his Molecular Destabilizer gun. Rimmer also grabs a holo-lamp that his father gave him as a child, containing a message that he is supposed to listen to once he becomes an officer.

The Dwarfers escape in Blue Midget, leading the Annihilators and Death Ship, captained by Dominator Zlurg (Gary Cady) and his assistant Chancellor Wednesday (Alex Hardy), away from Red Dwarf. They proceed to a nearby asteroid belt, finding an asteroid large enough to hide inside. As the Simulants close in, they are forced to come up with a battle plan, a responsibility that Lister bestows upon Rimmer on the grounds that he's familiar with both Astro-Navigation and military strategy. Rimmer rises to the challenge, albeit uncertainly. He attempts to make a battle plan in the storage room, but he is unable to concentrate. The Cat (Danny John-Jules), while playing with some string, unexpectedly points out to Rimmer why he's never able to focus – his father. He suggests that Rimmer just forget about trying to impress him and move on.

Inspired, Rimmer decides to play the message on the holo-lamp so that he can prove to himself he doesn't care what his father thinks. However, the message gives him a shocking revelation – Rimmer's father isn't his biological father. His real father is the family gardener, "Dungo". Although shaken by this news, Rimmer manages to turn it around in his favour. He reckons his real father, a humble gardener, would have been proud of his accomplishments (i.e.: second technician in the JMC, senior officer of a mining ship, and he "doesn't smell of manure"). With his new-found confidence, he comes up with a plan of action. At first, the others dismiss his plan as being "crap" and put it to a vote. With all three voting against it, Rimmer almost votes with them, but remembering how his father humiliated him in school, he stands by his decision, and in a rare show of bravery, he tells his crew-mates that they can do this. Rousing them together, they all agree and fly Blue Midget out of the asteroid belt.

Immediately surrounded from all sides by all four of the Simulant ships, Rimmer opens communication with Zlurg and Wednesday, offering surrender. The Simulants are amused by this proposal, and fire missiles inward at Blue Midget from all four directions. After giving them a chance to call off their attack, Rimmer gives the order and Lister promptly uses the Molecular Destabilizer to destabilize Blue Midget's bulkheads, allowing the missiles to pass harmlessly through the cockpit and continue straight into all four Simulant ships, destroying them. Pleased with his heroics and content with his new humble background, Rimmer gives the following order: "Kryten – set a course for Red Dwarf! The slime's coming home!", a direct reference to the final line of the very first episode (titled "The End"): "Holly, plot a course for Fiji! Look out, Earth, the slime's coming home!".

In a post-credit sequence, the crew return to their mothership as Rimmer remarks he saved the crew again just like he did from the ship-eating microbe in "Only the Good..." But before Lister can describe what actually happened, they are interrupted and dismayed to find Hogey still on the ship.

== Production ==
The original plan for the final two episodes of Series X was for a plot that would see the reintroduction of Kristine Kochanski. However production problems meant the plan had to be ditched, and two new episodes were written at short notice. Much of this episode was adapted from the unused script for the Red Dwarf movie. The original working title for this episode was "Death Day", but it was changed to "The Beginning" in deliberate reference to the first ever episode of Red Dwarf, "The End".

The episode featured Richard O'Callaghan playing the rogue droid called "Hogey the Roguey". Hogey was a character from the aborted movie, and O'Callaghan had years earlier played the role during the pre-production script readings of the movie. O'Callaghan subsequently appeared on Red Dwarf: Back to Earth playing the "creator" tracked down by the crew.

The episode began with a scene depicting Rimmer's father played by Simon Treves. Rimmer's father had previously appeared in the series II episode "Better Than Life", where he was played by John Abineri.

The simulant leader "Dominator Zlurth" was played by Gary Cady, who reportedly did not realise he was shooting a comedy until after his first scene.

The episode was dedicated to the memory of Peter Wragg, the BBC Visual Effects Designer who created the original spaceship models for Red Dwarf, and oversaw the effects for the first seven series.

== Cultural references ==
The psychological experiment performed on young Rimmer at the beginning of the episode, in which an unsuspecting student gives erroneous answers to simple questions in order to conform to the behaviour of his peers, is based on the Asch conformity experiments conducted by Solomon Asch in the 1950s.

The episode takes several inspirations from the second Star Wars film, The Empire Strikes Back. The Red Dwarf crew are pursued into an asteroid field and hide inside an asteroid in a similar manner to the crew of the Millennium Falcon in Empire, with several shots in the episode referencing those in the original film. Later in the episode, Rimmer gets a message informing him that his father isn't his biological father, which is a send off of the revelation that Darth Vader is Luke Skywalker's father.

== Critical reception ==
Reviews for the sixth episode were positive. SFX gave it 4.5 stars out of five stating that "Red Dwarf X ends on a high note with probably the best episode of the series" and said that "we sorely hope there is more Red Dwarf". Starburst gave it eight stars out of ten, and said that the episode "saw the show go out on an appropriate high." Similarly Radio Times called the episode "chock-full of zingers" and said that with "ratings for this tenth series consistently topping one million, let's hope we get some further adventures soon."
