= Mark Dexter =

English actor

- Born: Mark Lee Dexter; 21 April 1973 (age 53); Nottingham, Nottinghamshire, England
- Occupation: Actor
- Years active: 1985–present

Mark Lee Dexter (born 21 April 1973) is an English actor who trained at RADA.

== Life and career ==
Dexter was born in Nottingham, Nottinghamshire, England.

As a teenager, he was an early member of the Central Junior Television Workshop which led to various TV roles before he moved from Nottingham to London to attend RADA.

After graduating in 1995, Dexter's early successes were on stage, in particular with two high-profile productions of Tennessee Williams plays, beginning with Sam Mendes's 1995 Olivier Award-winning production of The Glass Menagerie at the Donmar Warehouse, in which he played Jim O'Connor. This was soon followed by Trevor Nunn's Tony Award-winning production of Williams's never-before-seen Not About Nightingales, which transferred from London's National Theatre to the Circle in the Square Theatre on Broadway in 1999.

Since then, Dexter has moved primarily into film and television. Among an extensive list of credits, he is probably best known for his portrayals of prominent political figures including David Cameron in the Channel 4 political drama Coalition, Tony Benn in the Netflix drama The Crown, John Dean in Charles Ferguson's 2018 series Watergate - as well as the fictional 'UK Prime Minister' in Transformers: The Last Knight. In his native UK he is also known for his role of Timothy Gray in the 1950s-set ITV crime drama The Bletchley Circle, opposite screen wife Anna Maxwell Martin. He has made various appearances on British science fiction shows including Red Dwarf and multiple roles on Doctor Who - most notably with his 2020 portrayal of computer pioneer Charles Babbage.

Between October 2008 and January 2009, Mark Dexter made regular appearances on NBC in America, playing the role of Samuel Tuffley in eight episodes of Crusoe, a major 12-part mini-series.

In summer 2009, Dexter returned to the National Theatre in London, playing Robin Conway in Rupert Goold's production of J. B. Priestley's Time and the Conways; he followed this by appearing alongside Kevin Spacey in the role of cynical journalist E.K. Hornbeck, a thinly disguised portrayal of H. L. Mencken, in Trevor Nunn's revival of Inherit the Wind, at the Old Vic.

During the first half of 2010, Dexter appeared in the recurring role of businessman Paul Stokes in Coronation Street. He played Count Skriczevinsky in Trevor Nunn's production of Flare Path at the Theatre Royal, Haymarket in 2011. He played a lead role in the 2011 released feature Blooded by Ed Boase.

In 2012, Dexter appeared in episode "Trojan" of the Dave series Red Dwarf as Arnold Rimmer's brother Howard.

In December 2012 in the UK (or January 2013 in the USA via BBC America), Dexter appeared as the principal villain, Sir Arthur Donaldson, in the opening episode of BBC's Victorian crime drama Ripper Street.

On 3 March 2013, Dexter portrayed the celebrated polar explorer Ernest Shackleton in episode 9 of the ITV series Mr Selfridge, and later that year he appeared as CIA Agent 'Marlow' in 24: Live Another Day, which was broadcast in the US and UK in spring 2014.

In October 2014, it was announced that Dexter would portray British Prime Minister David Cameron in political drama Coalition, a film for Channel 4 set to be broadcast in the run-up to the UK general election in 2015. It was broadcast on 28 March 2015.

In April 2015, he played David Cameron once again in a new production of Peter Morgan's play The Audience, alongside Kristin Scott Thomas as Queen Elizabeth II, directed by Stephen Daldry. In this production at The Apollo Shaftesbury Avenue, Dexter also played former Prime Minister Tony Blair.

Dexter was cast as Gestapo inspector 'Dietrich' in the WWII drama The Exception directed by David Leveaux, which had special screenings at the Toronto and Tribeca film festivals (September 2016 & April 2017), ahead of its general release in June 2017.

In 2020, Dexter joined the cast of the HBO finance drama Industry playing Hilary Wyndham throughout Season 1. Later, in December of that year, a second season of the show was announced.

== Filmography ==
- From Hell (2001) as Albert Sickert / Prince Edward Albert Victor
- Nicholas Nickleby (2002) as Young Ralph Nickleby
- 12 Days of Terror (2004, TV Movie) as Stanley
- Space Odyssey (2004, TV series) as John Pearson
- The Bill (2006, TV Series) as CPS lawyer
- Doctor Who (2008, TV Series) episodes "Silence in the Library" and "Forest of the Dead" as Dad
- Blooded (2011) as Charlie Bell
- The Bletchley Circle (2012–2014 TV Series) as Timothy
- Red Dwarf (2012, TV Series) as Howard Rimmer
- Ripper Street (2012, TV Series) as Sir Arthur Donaldson
- Mr Selfridge (2013) as Sir Ernest Shackleton
- The Invisible Woman (2013) as Mr. Augustus Egg
- 24: Live Another Day (2014, TV Series) as Marlow
- Coalition (2015, TV Movie) as David Cameron
- The Exception (2016) as Dietrich
- Transformers: The Last Knight (2017) as UK Prime Minister
- The Crown (2019, TV Series) as Tony Benn
- Doctor Who (2020) "Spyfall" as Charles Babbage
- Industry (2020, TV Series) as Hilary Wyndham
