= Richard O'Callaghan =

English actor (born 1940)

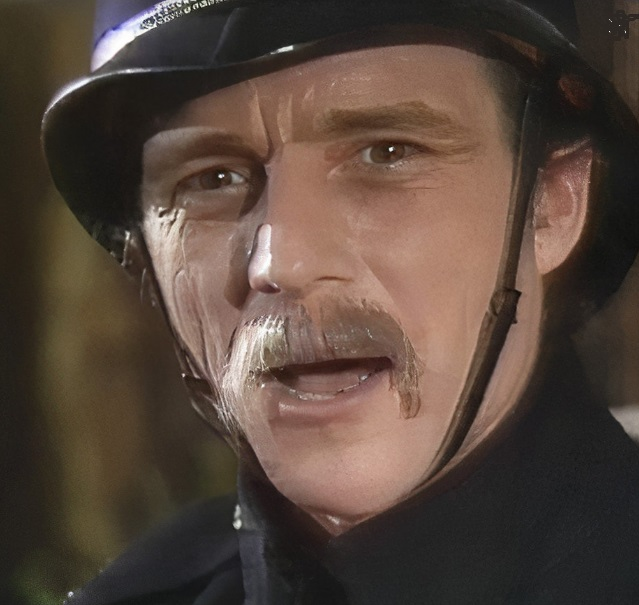
- O'Callaghan performing in The Green Tie on the Little Yellow Dog
- Born: Richard Brooke; 7 March 1940 (age 86); London, England
- Occupation: Actor
- Years active: 1965–present
- Spouse: Elizabeth Quinn (m. 1991)
- Parent(s): Valentine Brooke and Patricia Hayes

Richard O'Callaghan (born Richard Brooke; 7 March 1940) is an English character actor.

He is the son of actors Patricia Hayes and Valentine Brooke, whose stage name was Valentine Rooke. As a boy actor he was known as Richard Brooke. He has led a versatile career in film, stage and television in a wide range of roles. He is best known for his roles in the bawdy British comedy films Carry On Loving (1970) and Carry On At Your Convenience (1971).

== Career ==
During the 1950s, O'Callaghan began working as a child actor in theatre and radio, where at the time he was credited under his birth name.

His first major television role was as Richard Doherty in the 13-part childrens series The Flower of Gloster, loosely based on the novel by E. Temple Thurston. Produced by Granada Television, it was the company's first TV series to be filmed in colour.

O' Callaghan has played a number of supporting roles in various TV series including Z Cars, Public Eye, New Scotland Yard, Churchill's People, Two's Company, Mr. Pye, Imaginary Friends, Hannay, Spatz, Heartbeat, Midsomer Murders, Dalziel and Pascoe, Casualty, The Afternoon Play and New Tricks.

Between 1978 to 1980, he played Stephen Benge in the comedy drama series Born and Bred, which focused on two South London families, the Benges and Tonselys, who struggle to get along.

In 1989, he appeared with his mother Patricia Hayes in the Boon episode "The Rise of Fall of the Bowman Empire", where he played ex-convict Cecil Bowman and Hayes played his mother Elsepth respectively.

He regularly appeared as ageing metal head Bobby Sykes in the crime-drama series McCallum.

O' Callaghan has appeared in two episodes of Red Dwarf, he played The Creator in "Back to Earth Part 3", and in the following series, he played Hoguey the Rogey in the Series X finale "The Beginning".

== Personal life ==
In 1991, O' Callaghan married American actress Elizabeth Quinn.

== Filmography ==
=== Film ===
Year	Title	Role	Notes
1968	The Bofors Gun	Rowe	
1970	Carry On Loving	Bertram Muffet	
1971	Carry On at Your Convenience	Lewis Boggs	
1974	Butley	Joey Keyston	
1975	Galileo	Fulganzio	
1978	Watership Down	Dandelion (voice)	
1998	Dangerous Beauty	Zealot	

=== Television ===
Year	Title	Role	Notes
1965	Out of the Unknown	Boy	Episode: "Stranger in the Family"
1965	Z-Cars	Jim Blackitt	Episode: "Celebration"
1967	The Flower of Gloster	Richard Doherty	13 episodes
1968	The Ronnie Barker Playhouse	Shelley Longfellow Morgan	Episode: "Tennyson"
1968 –1969	Public Eye	Brian Davidson; Frank	2 episodes: Brian in "Mercury in an Off-White Mac" (season 3) and Frank in "Divide and Conquer" (season 4)
1969	The Wednesday Play	Fowler	Episode: "The Last Train through Harecastle Tunnel"
1970	Thirty-Minute Theatre	Francis	Episode: "The Tidewatchers"
1970	Vile Bodies	Adam	Television film
1972	New Scotland Yard	Joseph Marriot	Episode: "The Palais Romeo"
1973	Seven of One	Mortlake Owen	Episode: "I'll Fly You for a Quid"
1973	Thriller	George Bailey	Episode: "File It Under Fear"
1974 – 1980	Play for Today	Tortoiseshell; Mike; Clive	3 episodes
1975	Churchill's People	Ranulf	Episode: "On the Anvil"
1977	Professional Foul	Chetwyn	Television film
1978	Crown Court	Peter Benson-Pitt	Episode: "Scalped" (3 parts)
1978	Renoir, My Father	Auguste Renoir	Television film
1978 – 1980	Born and Bred	Stephen Benge	11 episodes
1979	Two's Company	Richard	Episode: "The Silence"
1982	The Merry Wives of Windsor	Slender	Television film
1986	Mr. Pye	Thorpe	4 episodes
1987	Imaginary Friends	Prof. Steve Mayone	3 episodes
1988	Tickets for the Titanic	Tom	Episode: "Pastoral Care"
1989	Boon	Cecil Bowman	Episode: "The Fall and Rise of the Bowman Empire"
1989	Hannay	Bald-headed Man	Episode: "The Good Samaritan"
1992	Spatz	Horace Flint	Episode: "Extortion"
1995 – 1998	McCallum	Bobby Sykes	9 episodes
1996	The Prince and the Pauper	Peddler	2 episodes
1996 – 2014	Casualty	Joe Preston; Eddie Morris; Rob Cornwall	3 episodes
1997	The History of Tom Jones, a Foundling	Mr. Fitzpatrick	2 episodes
1997	The Pale Horse	Donald	Television film
2005	Heartbeat	Ringer Redknapp	Episode: "Rustlers & Hustlers"
2005	Midsomer Murders	Trevor Machin	Episode: "Bantling Boy"
2005	Twenty Thousand Streets Under the Sky	Bank Teller	3 episodes
2006	The Afternoon Play	Harry	Episode: "Molly"
2007	Dalziel and Pascoe	Aiden Scarman	4 episodes
2008	New Tricks	Will Carter	Episode: "Loyalties and Royalties"
2009	Red Dwarf: Back to Earth	The Creator	Episode: "Part Three"
2012	Red Dwarf X	Hogey the Roguey	Episode: "The Beginning"

=== Theatre ===
- Dirty Linen (1976); Almost Free Theatre
- Brimstone and Treacle (1979); Open Space Theatre
- Amadeus (1981); Her Majesty's Theatre, London
- The Happiest Days of Your Life (1984); Barbican Theatre, London
- The Magistrate (2000); Royal Exchange, Manchester
- Educating Rita (2002; UK tour)
- 1605 (2005); Chichester Festival Theatre
- King Lear (2005); Chichester Festival Theatre
- Titus Andronicus (2006; as Marcus Andronicus); Shakespeare's Globe
- The Last Confession (2007); Chichester Festival Theatre/Theatre Royal, Haymarket
- Twelfth Night (2008; as Malvolio); Open Air Theatre, Regent's Park
- The Story of Vasco (2009; as Caesar); Orange Tree Theatre
- Haunting Julia (2011; as Joe Lukin); Riverside Studios, Hammersmith
- The Last Confession (2014; World tour)
- The Importance of Being Earnest (2015);(Vaudeville Theatre)

== Radio credits ==
- Murder Must Advertise (1979, BBC Radio) - Mr Willis
- The Lord of the Rings (1981, BBC Radio) - Meriadoc Brandybuck
- Have His Carcase (1981, BBC Radio) - Julian Perkins
- Patterson (1981, BBC Radio) - Cuthbertson
