= Lucie Pohl =

German-American actress (born 1987)

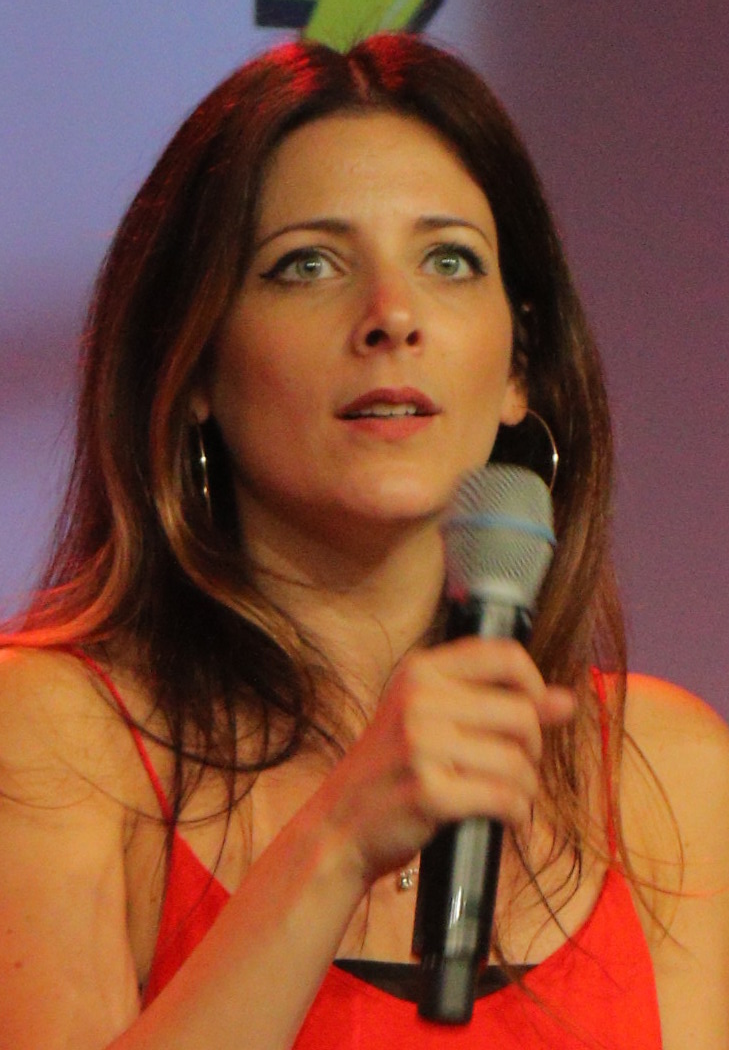
- Pohl at the Florida Supercon in 2018
- Born: April 15, 1983 (age 43); Hamburg, West Germany
- Occupations: Actress, comedian
- Website: www.luciepohl.com

Lucie Pohl (born April 15, 1983) is a German-American actress and stand-up comedian.

== Early life ==
Pohl is the daughter of theater director and singer Sanda Weigl and the actor and dramatist Klaus Pohl. She is sister of writer Marie Pohl and cousin of actress Anna Thalbach. She is also a relative of Bertolt Brecht.

== Career ==
Pohl is the voice actress for the hero Mercy in the video game Overwatch. She featured in the Red Dwarf episode "Twentica" as Harmony de Gauthier.

== Personal life ==
She became a naturalized U.S. citizen in October 2021.

== Filmography ==
=== Film ===
Year	Title	Role	Notes
2000	Allerd Fishbein's in Love	Marikke Guttman	Short film
2003	Hamlet_X	Ophelia	
2004	Endlich Sex!	Nicolette	Television film
2007	29... and still a virgin	Amira	Television film
2007	Kein Bund fürs Leben	Mrs. Angela Ridgeley	
2007	Erlkönig	Tilda	Television film
2008	Die Weisheit der Wolken	Studentenvertreterin	Television film
2009	Locked	Jenny	
2009	Must Love Death	Liza	
2012	Not Fade Away	Severine	
2014	Blame Freud	Sandra	
2015	Sam	Speed Talker 2	
2015	El cielo es azul	Chloe	
2016	Magi	Olivia Watkins	
2016	Psychophonia	Stephanie	
2016	Fantastic Beasts and Where to Find Them	Secretary	
2017	Forget About Nick	Lucie	

=== Television ===
Year	Title	Role	Notes
2006	Freunde für immer - Das Leben ist rund	Vanessa	4 episodes
2006	Pastewka	Lisa	Episode: "Das Praktikum"
2009	Der Kriminalist	Daniela "Donna" Olbert	Episode: "Zerschlagene Träume"
2014	Montauk Boys	Sam	Unknown episodes
2015	Homeland	Assistant	Episode: "Separation Anxiety"
2016	Red Dwarf	Harmony de Gauthier	Episode: "Twentica"
2024	Megamind Rules!	Rochelle (voice)	Episode: "Roach Hard: With a Vengeance"
2025	The Loud House	Ula Ratu (voice)	Episode: "Europe Road Trip: A Bite in Transylvania"

=== Video games ===
Year	Title	Voice role	Notes
2014	Hearthstone	Netherspite Historian, Pegleg Partycrasher, Starry Knight, Menagerie Druid	
2016	Overwatch	Mercy	
2018	World of Warcraft: Battle for Azeroth	Rixxa Fluxflame	
2018	Red Dead Redemption 2	The Local Pedestrian Population	
2022	Overwatch 2	Mercy	
2022	Gotham Knights	Techie Thug	

== Stand-up ==
- Hi Hitler (2014)
- Cry Me a Liver (2015)
