= U (streaming service) =

Video-on-demand service owned by UKTV

- Logo used since 2024
- Other names: UKTV Play (2014–2024)
- Original author: UKTV
- Release: 4 August 2014; 11 years ago
- Platform: iOS, Android, Windows, macOS, YouView, Virgin Media, Now
- Available in: English
- Website: u.co.uk

U is UKTV’s free, ad-supported streaming service in the UK, offering on-demand access to programmes from UKTV’s free-to-air channels including U&Dave, U&Drama, U&W, U&Yesterday, Pay-TV channels including U&Eden, U&Alibi and U&Gold. The service launched on 4 August 2014. UKTV is operated by the BBC’s commercial subsidiary BBC Studios.

== History ==
UKTV Play was first announced in June 2014. Prior to its launch, each UKTV channel had their own on-demand services.

UKTV Play launched on iOS in August, on PC, YouView and Virgin Media in November and on Android in February 2015. The service would then launch on Freeview Play in August 2016, on Roku and Sky UK's Now in February 2018, and on Freesat and Samsung smart TVs in September 2018.

Following the relaunch of W (originally Watch) as a free-to-air service, the channel's shows became available to watch for free on UKTV Play.

=== Rebrand to U ===
In November 2023, UKTV announced that UKTV Play would be renamed as U, as part of the unification of UKTV's channels and service under the new masterbrand. UKTV Play rebranded as U on 16 July 2024.

In September 2024 U became available on Freely. In September 2025, the U app was added to Sky Q boxes in the UK. In January 2026, UKTV and Channel 4 agreed a deal that would see thousands of hours of U content also made available on Channel 4 streaming.
