= Doug Naylor =

British writer

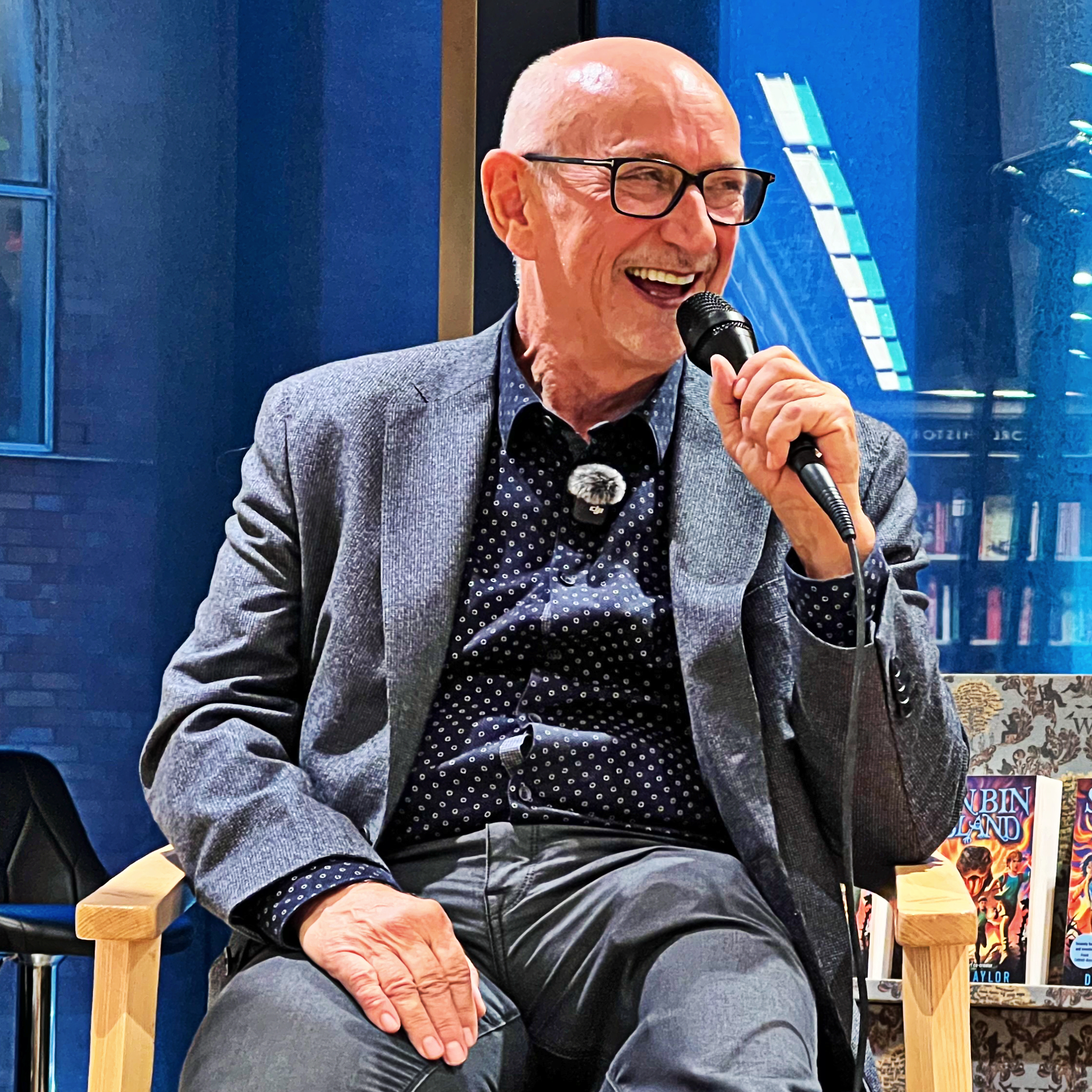
- Naylor at Liverpool One's Waterstones, 9 October 2025
- Born: Douglas Naylor; 31 December 1955 (age 70); Manchester, Lancashire, England
- Education: University of Liverpool
- Occupations: Director, screenwriter, television producer, novelist
- Spouse: Linda Glover
- Children: 2
- Writing career
- Period: 1982–present
- Genres: Comedy, drama, adventure, science fiction

Douglas Naylor (born 31 December 1955) is an English writer, director, television producer and author, best known as the co-creator of the cult British sci-fi comedy series Red Dwarf.

== Life and career ==
Naylor was born in Manchester, Lancashire, England. He met future collaborator Rob Grant when they were both attending Chetham's Hospital School. The pair later studied Psychology at Liverpool University for two years, before both dropping out to pursue a writing career.

After providing a variety of comedy material on a freelance basis, the pair were hired to a contract for BBC Radio, working on programs such as the sketch shows Cliché and Son of Cliché, the original sitcom Wrinkles, and the topical show The News Huddlines.

Soon afterwards the duo started to also work in television, including Three of a Kind, which was produced by Paul Jackson, and contributing towards Carrott's Lib. In 1984, they began work on an original television sitcom pilot, based on a sketch from Son of Cliché, Red Dwarf. The BBC initially declined to commission the show and instead Grant and Naylor took a position as head writers on Spitting Image, joining midway through the first season. Apart from sketchwriting, Naylor, with Grant, wrote the lyrics to Spitting Images's "The Chicken Song", which topped the UK singles chart for three weeks in 1986.

In 1986, the BBC would eventually pick up Red Dwarf, with a commission from BBC North West. A first series, after some production delays, was broadcast in 1988, and was followed by another later that year. Grant and Naylor became producers of the show from its third series in 1989, and in a short period collaborated on two novelisations of Red Dwarf, travelled for work on an American spin-off, and worked on three more British series. They also worked together on a new sitcom set in a theatrical agency, called The 10%ers.

By the time of series one of The 10%ers, Grant had broken up the writing partnership with Naylor. With this split, it appeared as though Red Dwarf was finished; other obstacles included the fact that Chris Barrie was tied up starring in The Brittas Empire and the other star of Red Dwarf, Craig Charles, was in prison awaiting trial. However, when Charles was acquitted and Barrie became available for a few episodes, a seventh series finally went ahead. Naylor went on to write the seventh and eighth series of Red Dwarf mostly on his own (70% of the series, by his own estimate), although some episodes were co-written with Paul Alexander and Kim Fuller, and one episode co-written with one of the cast members, Robert Llewellyn.

Naylor is the author of the Red Dwarf novel Last Human (1995). He also wrote Primordial Soup (1993), Son of Soup (1996) and Red Dwarf VII: The Official Book (1999).

In 2007, Naylor and Grant Naylor Productions were primarily focused on the production of the DVD releases of Red Dwarf and the postulated movie. In 2008, it was announced by Grant Naylor Productions that Red Dwarf would return to television in the form of four half-hour specials for the UKTV Network channel Dave. The episodes were broadcast over the Easter weekend of 2009, and comprising a three-part special (20 minutes each), Back to Earth, and a behind-the-scenes making of special. Naylor wrote the scripts for the three new episodes and also directed them. Back to Earth received record ratings for the Dave channel.

In 2011, Dave commissioned Naylor to write and direct a new six episode series of Red Dwarf, later entitled Red Dwarf X. The series won the Royal Television Society's award for Best Special Effects, presented in 2013.

Naylor formed Three Feet Productions in October 2017 with his son Richard and wrote and directed a one-off comedy for BBC One, entitled Over To Bill, starring Hugh Dennis, Neil Morrissey, Tracy Ann Oberman and Helen George and produced by Richard Naylor.

In 2015–2016, Naylor wrote and directed 12 more episodes of Red Dwarf for Dave. Red Dwarf XI was broadcast from September 2016 onwards, and Red Dwarf XII from September 2017. Both series were a Baby Cow Productions commission, with Richard Naylor and Kerry Waddell as producers.

In 2020, Red Dwarf: The Promised Land, a 90 minute TV special, was again written and directed by Naylor for Dave and was a Baby Cow production, with Richard Naylor as producer. Naylor has now written or co-written all 74 episodes of Red Dwarf and was executive producer on 51 episodes.

== Personal life ==
Naylor is married with two sons, one of whom (Richard) is a television writer and producer, the other a doctor. Naylor has a prosthetic leg due to a road accident when he was seven years old, hence the naming of his and Richard's production company Three Feet Productions.

== Writing credits ==
Production	Notes	Broadcaster
Carrott's Lib	15 episodes (1982–83)	BBC1
Pushing Up Daisies	Unknown episodes (1984)	Channel 4
Spitting Image	16 episodes (co-written with Rob Grant, 1985–86)	ITV
Comic Relief	"Spitting Image's Royal Address" (co-written with Rob Grant, Ian Hislop, Nick Newman and Geoffrey Perkins, 1986)	BBC1
Spitting Image: Down and Out in the White House	Television film (co-written with Rob Grant, 1986)	ITV
Spitting Image: The Ronnie and Nancy Show	Short film (co-written with Rob Grant, 1987)	ITV
Spitting Image: The 1987 Movie Awards	Television film (co-written with Rob Grant, 1987)	ITV
Red Dwarf	74 episodes; Series I–VI co-written with Rob Grant, (1988–93); Series VII & VIII writer or co-writer, (1997–99); Series IX–XII writer, (2009–17); Red Dwarf: The Promised Land 90 Minute Special, writer (2020)	BBC2 (1988–99); Dave (2009–20)
Red Dwarf USA	Unaired pilot (co-written with Rob Grant, 1992)	NBC
Carlton Playhouse	"The 10%ers" (Pilot; co-written with Rob Grant, 1993)	ITV
The 10 Percenters	15 episodes ( written or co-written with Paul Alexander, 1993–96)	ITV
Red Dwarf Night	"Can't Smeg, Won't Smeg" (1998); Universe Challenge (1998)	BBC2
Comedy Playhouse	"Over to Bill" (2014)	BBC1

== Bibliography ==
- Red Dwarf (1989), a.k.a. Red Dwarf: Infinity Welcomes Careful Drivers or Infinity Welcomes Careful Drivers; with Rob Grant as Grant Naylor
- Better Than Life (1990), with Rob Grant as Grant Naylor
- Primordial Soup (1993), with Grant (collection of scripts from the TV show Red Dwarf)
- Son of Soup (1996), with Grant (second volume of Red Dwarf scripts)
- Last Human (1995), a sequel to Better Than Life)
- Sin Bin Island (2025), a children's novel
