= DNA (Red Dwarf) =

- Red Dwarf episode
- Episode no.: Series 4 Episode 2
- Directed by: Ed Bye
- Written by: Rob Grant; Doug Naylor
- Original air date: 21 February 1991

Guest appearance
- Richard Ridings as D.N.A. Ship Computer

Episode chronology
← Previous "Camille"	Next → "Justice"
- Red Dwarf IV

"DNA" is the second episode of the science fiction sitcom Red Dwarf Series IV and the twentieth episode in the series' run.

It was written by Rob Grant and Doug Naylor, and directed by Ed Bye, and was first broadcast on the British television channel BBC2 on 21 February 1991. The episode revolves around genetic engineering technology that the crew discover.

== Plot ==
Red Dwarf encounters a drifting spacecraft which Arnold Rimmer (Chris Barrie), Dave Lister (Craig Charles), Kryten (Robert Llewellyn), and Cat (Danny John-Jules) decide to investigate. Once on board, the group split into pairs. While Rimmer and Kryten find the remains of a mutated human with three heads, Cat accidentally activates a machine that turns Lister into a chicken. When the others arrive, Kryten determines that the ship's crew were researching DNA modifications and that the machine Cat used can rewrite the DNA of anything with organic matter. When an attempt to reverse the effect on Lister changes him into a hamster, Cat repeats the actions he did to change him. However, while Lister is restored to his human body, Kryten finds himself turned into a human, due to his brain being part-organic.

Returning to Red Dwarf, Kryten is initially ecstatic at being human, but finds he cannot conduct certain functions that he did as a mechanoid, and soon regrets the change after he insults his mechanoid spare heads, as well as revealing his sexual arousal to machines in a machine catalogue that he reads. The group agree to help him return to his original form, but Rimmer suggests they use a test subject first on the DNA modifier as a precaution. Lister opts to have the machine change the meat in his vindaloo, but the modifier changes it into a living mutant beast that proves to be indestructible to their weapons. Lister opts to be changed into a powerful fighting machine and becomes a cyborg that he calls "Man Plus", only to be a foot in height. He discovers and exploits the creature's vulnerability to lager to kill it.

== Production ==
"DNA", official full title "Do Not Alter", changed the continuity of the relationship between Lister and Kristine Kochanski. It is established that they had been dating and that she broke up with him, an idea which had been introduced in the novel Infinity Welcomes Careful Drivers. Doug Naylor and Craig Charles explained that Lister's infatuation with Kochanski, despite barely knowing her, was unrealistic.

With the tail end of production and finances running low the DNA ship's set was rushed and was not as had been expected. However, the grungy-looking corridors and rooms were better than nothing which may have been the case.

Paul McGuinness, a member of the effects team, wore the Vindaloo Mutant outfit. He also produced the three-headed corpse that Kryten and Rimmer discover on board the DNA ship. Richard Ridings voices the D.N.A. Ship Computer.

Blue-screen techniques was used to produce the transformation of Lister to a one-foot-tall (0.30-metre) "super-human" man plus. Craig Charles was shot in front of a bluescreen to make him appear one foot tall, while this was added to the other crew's footage, who were also involved in blue screen, as they run by the small Lister.

== Cultural references ==
Using the DNA modifier, Holly turns Lister into a super-human fighting machine "Man Plus". The result transforms Lister into a small replica hybrid of RoboCop from the 1987 film of the same name.

== Reception ==
"DNA" was first broadcast on the British television channel BBC2 on 21 February 1991 in the 9:00 p.m. evening time slot. Its position in the running order was affected by the Gulf War hostilities at the time, which meant that "Dimension Jump", originally the series' opener, and "Meltdown" were held back.

The episode was considered to be one of the better episodes from the fourth series; however, it did receive some criticism for moving the humour away from the characters and into situation-based comedy.

Sophie Davies, writing for CultBox in 2017 said that "the ending of 'DNA' rather lets it down, as the story of Kryten becoming human is abandoned", and that "It's fun seeing Robert Llewellyn playing the part without his mask, and I wish this episode had done a bit more to explore it."
