= Camille (Red Dwarf) =

- Red Dwarf episode
- Episode no.: Series 4 Episode 1
- Directed by: Ed Bye
- Written by: Rob Grant; Doug Naylor
- Original air date: 14 February 1991

Guest appearances
- Judy Pascoe as Mechanoid Camille; Francesca Folan as Hologram Camille; Suzanne Rhatigan as Kochanski Camille; Rupert Bates as Hector Blob

Episode chronology
← Previous "The Last Day"	Next → "DNA"
- Red Dwarf IV

"Camille" is the first episode of science fiction sitcom Red Dwarf Series IV and the nineteenth episode in the series run.

It was first broadcast on the British television channel BBC2 on 14 February 1991. The episode was planned to be the third in the series but was brought forward to be shown on Valentine's Day. It was written by Rob Grant and Doug Naylor, and directed by Ed Bye.

The episode, a parody of the film Casablanca, sees Kryten rescue and fall in love with an android who appears to be the same model as himself.

== Plot ==
Dave Lister (Craig Charles) does his best to teach Kryten (Robert Llewellyn) to lie, stating he needs it as a natural form of defence. Although Kryten has some success, he finds he cannot properly lie in the presence of anyone else, and is forced to abandon his lessons when Arnold Rimmer (Chris Barrie) requires him to pilot a Starbug for asteroid spotting. When they receive a distress call from a doomed ship, Kryten manages to make use of Lister's insubordination training to search for survivors, despite Rimmer's orders against this. The pair swiftly encounter and rescue Camille, the only survivor, and become attracted to her – Kryten sees her as another mechanoid like himself (Judy Pascoe), yet Rimmer sees her as a hologram with similar interests that he has (Francesca Folan). When they bring her back to Red Dwarf, Lister meets her and finds her attractive – to him, she appears as a human female with interests matching his own (Suzanne Rhatigan). However, he soon suspects something is not right with her when Rimmer arrives and questions her over viewing one of his collections and hears a different response to what Lister gets from her. When Cat (Danny John-Jules) meets her, he sees Camille as a mirror version of himself.

Lister informs the crew that Camille is actually a pleasure GELF – a Genetically Engineered Life Form – designed to appear to each individual as the object of their desire, and is in reality a slimy green blob with tentacles. Although hurt, Kryten compliments Camille's true appearance and opts to date her in her actual form, including showing her the film Casablanca that Lister used as inspiration for Kryten's lessons. When Camille finds that her husband has turned up looking for her, Kryten advises her, in a similar manner to the film's ending, to leave with him rather than stay, and stoically waves goodbye. When Lister learns that Kryten lied to her to spare her feelings, he smiles at knowing he has learnt well, especially when Kryten insults him for being responsible for what happened.

== Production ==
For Series IV, recording of the show moved from the studios in Manchester to Shepperton Studios due to the old studio undergoing refurbishment. Shepperton turned out to be a blessing to the show as it allowed for use of the sets for rehearsals in addition to recording. Production starting with Series IV also permanently shifted to Grant Naylor Productions.

The droid version of the GELF was played by Judy Pascoe, Robert Llewellyn's partner (they have since married). Llewellyn has often joked how he used to complain to Pascoe about the amount of make-up he had to endure, and yet when she wore it she had no complaints. She also provided the voice of the blob Camille, which was controlled from inside by effects artist Mike Tucker.

Suzanne Rhatigan as "Kochanski Camille"

The initial plan was for Camille to appear as Kristine Kochanski in Lister's eyes; while this later changed, Suzanne Rhatigan was still credited as "Kochanski Camille". Like Pascoe and Llewellyn, Rhatigan and Craig Charles were in a relationship at the time of the recording. The Hologram Camille was played by Francesca Folan. Rupert Bates voiced the Hector Blob.

This episode was not originally planned to be aired first, but was moved forward when "Meltdown" was held back due to the ongoing hostilities in the Gulf War. It was decided to broadcast this episode first due to the fact that it seemed an appropriate one to air on Valentine's Day.

Grant and Naylor's script for the episode was collected in the 1995 book Son of Soup.

== Cultural references ==
Casablanca is referenced extensively in the episode, with Kryten and Camille watching the film together. When Lister explains to Kryten why it is necessary to lie, he mentions examples of Humphrey Bogart in the final scene of Casablanca and Nelson's "I see no ships." The ending of Casablanca is also quoted in the Kryten and Camille farewell scene.

== Reception ==
The episode was first broadcast on the British television channel BBC2 on 14 February 1991 in the 9:00pm time slot, although it was originally planned to be shown as the third episode of Series IV as shown in the repeat runs in both 1992 and 1994. The series' transmission order was changed as it was felt more appropriate to run the episode on Valentine's Day and so it went out first. Further changes to the series' running order came about because of the outbreak of the Gulf War and the subject matter of some of the other episodes, notably "Dimension Jump" featuring the war-hero Ace Rimmer and the anti-war-themed "Meltdown".

Nancy Banks-Smith of The Guardian said that the episode was "affecting" and "funny".

The episode was ranked 14th of the 30 then-existing episodes in a 1992 poll by the Red Dwarf Smegazine.

Writing in 2017 for CultBox, Sophie Davies said that the episode has "a corker of an opening scene" and "there are some good laughs to be had from the misunderstandings that Camille causes", but that after "Camille reveals herself to be a large green blob however, the episode gets a bit lighter on laughs, and the ending that parodies Casablanca is not particularly inventive."
