= Justice (Red Dwarf) =

- Red Dwarf episode
- Episode no.: Series 4 Episode 3
- Directed by: Ed Bye
- Written by: Rob Grant; Doug Naylor
- Original air date: 28 February 1991

Guest appearances
- Nicholas Ball as The Simulant; James Smillie as Justice Computer Voice

Episode chronology
← Previous "DNA"	Next → "White Hole"
- Red Dwarf IV

"Justice" is the third episode of science fiction sitcom Red Dwarf Series IV and the twenty-first episode in the series run. It was first broadcast on the British television channel BBC2 on 28 February 1991; although it was planned to be broadcast as the second episode, it was moved back in the schedule by the BBC. The episode was written by Rob Grant and Doug Naylor, and directed by Ed Bye and features the crew's visit to a high-tech prison where Rimmer is charged with the death of the Red Dwarf crew.

== Plot ==
Whilst Dave Lister (Craig Charles) spends a week in the medibay with a bout of space mumps, Red Dwarf picks up an escape pod from a prison ship that was transporting dangerous criminals. Lister and Cat (Danny John-Jules) discover the pod belongs to one Barbara Bellini, and in his eagerness to meet her Cat activates the one-way thaw process. Arnold Rimmer (Chris Barrie) and Kryten (Robert Llewellyn) discover this and inform the others they learned that the ship suffered a revolt that destroyed it and only two people managed to escape – female prison guard Barbara Bellini, and a psychotic mass-murdering simulant. Unsure as to which of the two is in the pod, the group are forced to transport it to the prison ship's assigned destination of Justice World – a prison complex that held trials for criminals, sentenced them for the crimes they committed and incarcerated them within, punishing them by making the consequences of any crime they commit happen to themselves through a Justice Field. Upon arriving, the complex's computer system scans the groups' minds, and convicts Rimmer on 1,167 counts of second-degree murder – the total number that died on Red Dwarf from his faulty drive-plate repair – sentencing him to 9,328 years imprisonment within the complex.

The group opt to prove that Rimmer was not responsible. Kryten acts as Rimmer's defence counsel, claiming that Rimmer's immense guilt stems from his own inflated sense of importance, and that he would never have been given the task in the first place if he was known to have been incompetent and insignificant. Despite being deeply offended by Kryten's defence, Rimmer is found not guilty and allowed to go. Before the group can leave, they discover that the pod opened in their absence and that the psychopathic simulant (Nicholas Ball) had been within it, now coming to hunt them down. Lister opts to confront it but struggles to hurt it until he recalls how Justice World works, thus taunting the simulant to attack him and be harmed in response to its "crimes", eventually dying from its own attempt to strangle Lister. Upon returning to Red Dwarf, Lister questions the futility of absolute justice, much to his friends' dislike, only to fall down an open manhole when he is not looking.

== Production ==
Taking influence from their own Red Dwarf novels, writers Rob Grant and Doug Naylor altered some of the historic facts of the show. This was to improve the backstory and keep it in line with their vision of the story as seen in the novels. In "Justice" we discover one of these adjustments is that the ship crew complement before the accident was 1,169 (the 1,167 "murdered" crew plus Rimmer and Lister) instead of the 169 stated in previous series.

Initially "Justice" was to feature the Justice World as a planet, but due to time constraints and finance it was seen as a space station instead. The ending was also changed at the last minute, after a scene earlier in the episode was cut where a giant bird dropping lands on Lister after he littered in the Justice Zone gardens. Lister's speech about man's sense of justice was subsequently added to the end.

The writers' vision of the Justice Zone was with a background that appeared to disappear into infinity. This was perceived as impossible to achieve with the budget available, so a compromise was reached. A huge light was placed at the back of the set masking the background limitations and giving the illusion that there was nothing behind it.

For the futuristic Justice Zone set the crew used the nearby Sunbury Pumphouse, a disused water pumping plant near the Shepperton studios. The set would provide the corridor settings and steps for the Justice Zone scenes. Guest performers included Nicholas Ball who played the simulant and James Smilie who voiced the Justice Computer.

Grant and Naylor's script for the episode was collected in the 1993 book Primordial Soup.

== Reception ==
The episode was first broadcast on the British television channel BBC2 on 28 February 1991. It was moved in the running order because the Gulf War hostilities meant that "Dimension Jump" and "Meltdown" were postponed. The episode had received a lukewarm reception from viewers, although it has been described as a "classic episode" by others.

Sophie Davies writing in 2017 for CultBox said that the episode was perhaps her favourite of Series IV, and "full of more strong, inventive ideas than [she] had remembered", and praised Kryten's speech in defence of Rimmer as a highlight.
