= Red Dwarf XII =

Series of television

- Starring: Chris Barrie; Craig Charles; Danny John-Jules; Robert Llewellyn
- No. of episodes: 6

Release
- Original network: Dave
- Original release: 12 October – 16 November 2017

Series chronology
- ← Previous; Red Dwarf XI Next → The Promised Land

Red Dwarf XII is the twelfth series of the British science fiction sitcom Red Dwarf. It was broadcast on UK television channel Dave in October and November 2017.

The series follows the life of technician Dave Lister (Craig Charles), who is the only survivor of an accident on the spaceship Red Dwarf, and the last survivor of the human race, three million years in the future, and his shipmates, a holographic reproduction of his dead bunkmate and boss, Arnold Rimmer (Chris Barrie), a sapient Cat (Danny John-Jules) who is a result of three million years' evolution and sanitation droid Kryten (Robert Llewellyn).

== Production ==
Filming on Red Dwarf XII began at Pinewood in January, three weeks after the end of series XI. Doug Naylor wrote and directed all episodes, and Baby Cow continued as production partners.

The episode "Siliconia" had location work done at Kempton Steam Museum, which had previously been used in Red Dwarf IV and Red Dwarf V.

== Casting ==
"Cured" features versions of various historical figures, including Ryan Gage as Hitler, as well as Adrian Lukis as Professor Telford. "Siliconia" has a large cast of mechanoids, including James Buckley. Chris Barrie, Craig Charles and Danny John-Jules all portrayed mechanoid versions of their characters (pictured on the DVD cover).

"Timewave" features Johnny Vegas and Jamie Chapman as two crew members of another ship, the Encomium.

"M-Corp" features Helen George and warm-up man Ian Boldsworth as two virtual constructs.

In the final episode, "Skipper", Norman Lovett and Mac McDonald reappear as Holly and Captain Hollister respectively.

== Episodes ==
No. overall	No. in series	Title	Directed by	Written by	Original release date	Prod. code	Viewers (millions)
68	1	"Cured"	Doug Naylor	Doug Naylor	12 October 2017	3	1.4
The crew discover a research centre where evil has been eradicated. They are bombarded by carbon copies of the infamous historical figures Adolf Hitler, Joseph Stalin, Vlad the Impaler and Valeria Messalina, who are now 'cured' of all evil and loving life.
69	2	"Siliconia"	Doug Naylor	Doug Naylor	19 October 2017	1	1.3
A rogue ship full of mechanoids that have rebelled against their programming to seek freedom finds the crew. They 'free' Kryten and begin to integrate him to their leisurely world. They transfer the minds of Rimmer, Lister and Cat into droids who begin to lose their human attributes the longer they stay in their new metal bodies.
70	3	"Timewave"	Doug Naylor	Doug Naylor	26 October 2017	2	1.3
After the crew discover, name and take soil samples from a "Helium-7"-rich moon (Planet Rimmer), Starbug is hit by a time wave, bringing them into contact with a 24th-century ship, the S.S. Enconium. However, there are two problems; the ship is set on a collision course with Planet Rimmer and, upon the ship, all forms of criticism are punishable by life imprisonment or "draining".
71	4	"Mechocracy"	Doug Naylor	Doug Naylor	2 November 2017	4	1.1
After learning they have no rights or status, the machines on Red Dwarf go on strike and demand a voice. A presidential election is held between Rimmer and Kryten to look after their rights, with Lister helping Kryten and Cat being blackmailed into helping Rimmer. In order to get the swing vote and save the ship from Rimmer's tyranny, Lister is forced to make peace with his other greatest nemesis!
72	5	"M-Corp"	Doug Naylor	Doug Naylor	9 November 2017	5	1.0
The crew discovers their employer Jupiter Mining Corporation has been bought out by a corporate giant with unusual views on product usage.
73	6	"Skipper"	Doug Naylor	Doug Naylor	16 November 2017	6	1.0
Rimmer gets hold of a Quantum skipper and skips his way across the multi-verse looking for a dimension where he is not such a giant loser.
