= Teviotville Tree =

Coordinates: 27°56′34″S 152°40′56″E

Location of the Teviotville Tree

Teviotville Tree is a large Moreton Bay fig tree in Teviotville, Scenic Rim Region, Queensland, Australia that featured in the movie L'Arbre (in French) or The Tree in English. The tree is a large, 130-year-old fig tree which was considered by the French producers to be a perfect tree for the movie, after an exhaustive search for just the right one (per the DVD bonus material).

The joint Australian-French movie is an adaptation of Judy Pascoe's novel Our Father Who Art in the Tree, starring French actress Charlotte Gainsbourg. The three-month movie shoot was completed in February 2010 and the movie was released in Australia on Sept 30, 2010.

As of March 2012, a view of this location on Google Earth still shows many vehicles and temporary buildings associated with the film production.
