= Roger Blake =

British actor

- Born: Roger Donald Blake; 21 December 1957 (age 68); Neath, Glamorgan, Wales
- Occupations: Actor, impressionist, voice actor
- Years active: 1978–2006

Roger Donald Blake (born 21 December 1957) is a Welsh actor, impressionist and entertainer. He is best known for his portrayal of Prince Philip in Spitting Image and The Big Impression and Noël Coward in television commercials and the Red Dwarf episode "Meltdown", and narrated Roald Dahl's The Enormous Crocodile, The Twits, as well as the Topsy and Tim animated series from 1991.

== Career ==
Blake had a steady career, he made appearances in British television sitcoms such as Blackadder II, Only Fools and Horses and Dear John. In 1990, he joined the cast of Spitting Image, where he became well known as the voice of Prince Philip; he also voiced other characters including George H. W. Bush, Robert Maxwell, John Prescott and Arnold Schwarzenegger.

It was on Spitting Image that he met Alistair McGowan; when the show was axed in May 1996, McGowan invited him to join him on his new television show The Big Impression, where again he voiced Prince Philip but also he became famous as the voice of Jim Royle in The Royle Family sketches. Blake was also known for his impression of Noël Coward, he played the playwright in television commercials for coffee and he also appeared as Coward in the Series Four finale episode of Red Dwarf, "Meltdown".

He made a brief appearance in the film Patriot Games, as a Constable. He voiced a policeman, as well as a balloon seller, in the movie Flushed Away in November 2006.

== Filmography ==
Year	Title	Role	Notes
1980	Phoelix		
1986	Car Trouble	Policeman #3	
1988	Roald Dahl's The Enormous Crocodile	Narrator	
1991	Buddy's Song	Car Dealer	
1991	Only Fools and Horses	Eugene Mccarthy	Episode: "Stage Fright"
1992	Patriot Games	Constable #1	
2006	Flushed Away	Policeman/Balloon Seller	Voice
