= Skipper (Red Dwarf) =

- Red Dwarf episode
- Episode no.: Series 12; Episode 6
- Directed by: Doug Naylor
- Written by: Doug Naylor
- Original air date: 16 November 2017

Guest appearances
- Norman Lovett as Holly; Mac McDonald as Captain Hollister; Richard Brimblecombe as Bradley; Tina Harris as Parkinson; Hayley-Marie Axe as Calm Woman (Voice)

Episode chronology
| ← Previous "M-Corp" | Next → "The Promised Land" |
- Red Dwarf XII

"Skipper" is the sixth episode of Red Dwarf XII and the 73rd in the series run. Originally broadcast on the British television channel Dave on 16 November 2017, it was made available early on 9 November 2017 on UKTV Play.

Kryten invents a new device, coined the "quantum skipper", which Rimmer uses in an attempt to find a universe where he is more successful.

== Synopsis ==
The crew look through Captain Hollister's files on the crew, where he derides both Lister (Craig Charles) and Rimmer (Chris Barrie) as terrible employees. While Lister shows little care over it, Rimmer is angered and insults the other three, claiming he should've surrounded himself with people more successful than him (with them pointing-out that they are). Later in the day, Kryten (Robert Llewellyn) notices a strange phenomenon on the monitors, which turns out to be a disruption in spacetime that reverts their timeline to one where their actions are or aren't taken. Such as switching from the timeline where Cat (Danny John-Jules) doesn't cook Lister breakfast to the one where it does.

After regrouping, the crew discover it was Kryten's new invention, the quantum skipper, which caused the error in time. After fixing his mistake, Rimmer requests he use the quantum skipper to traverse realities to find a better universe to live in compared to the one he's living in now. Kryten agrees, and the three see him off as Rimmer unceremoniously takes off. The first universe Rimmer travels to sees him on Red Dwarf pre-radiation leak; here, Rimmer is a hologram, unlike in his reality where he was alive before it occurred. After meeting-up with that universe's Holly and Captain Hollister (Mac McDonald), who was attempting a futile escape on a jammed escape pod, Rimmer escapes to a new universe. In the next one, Rimmer meets a more distinguished version of the crew, only for this universe's Cat to instead be a human-sized rat, known as Mr. Rat (also Danny John-Jules), alongside an entire race of rats who, unlike Cat's species, never left Red Dwarf. Rimmer decidedly leaves that one, and travels across several others, all he loathes.

Finally, he reaches one where he is an officer on Red Dwarf, is married, and has four boys — all of which Rimmer has always wanted. When reporting to the captain, however, he discovers Lister is the captain, having been the one to prevent the initial radiation leak and becoming immensely rich off Red Dwarf stocks when it discovered a valuable gas moon. Despite all his successes, Rimmer decides to abandon that universe, unable to cope with Lister being more successful than him. He returns to his original universe and joins the crew for a game of cards, with Lister remarking even with infinite universes at Rimmer's disposal, "infinite clearly wasn't enough".

== Production ==
With the returns of Holly and Captain Hollister, "Skipper" marks the return of Norman Lovett and Mac McDonald respectively to the show after their last appearance 18 years previously in the Series VIII finale, "Only the Good...". McDonald's scene was prerecorded and shown to the studio audience on monitors, whilst Lovett's scene was filmed live.

== Reception ==
"Skipper" received positive reviews from critics and fans. Writing for Cultbox, Sophie Davies summed up her feelings on the episode, "Next year will mark 30 years since Red Dwarf first appeared on our screens, and unless Dave commissions some sort of anniversary special sharpish, 'Skipper' functions perfectly well as a celebration of the show. This series finale full of nods to the past is sure to please the long-term fans, but overall it's more than simple fan service because there are plenty of new ideas in the mix too." In a 2018 poll conducted by Red Dwarf fansite, Ganymede & Titan, "Skipper" ranked the highest of both Series XII and the entire revival series since Back to Earth, coming in at 31 out of 73 episodes.
