= Our Father Who Art in the Tree =

Novel by Judy Pascoe

- Cover of Penguin Australia's first edition
- Author: Judy Pascoe
- Language: English
- Publisher: Penguin Books Australia
- Publication date: 2002
- Publication place: Australia
- Pages: 168
- ISBN: 0143000659

Our Father Who Art in the Tree is a 2002 debut novel by Australian writer Judy Pascoe. It is written from the perspective of 10-year-old Simone who believes her late father is living in the tree in her backyard.

The novel was reissued as Our Father Who Art in a Tree in the United States and Canada; and after the 2010 film adaptation directed by Julie Bertuccelli, it was reprinted as The Tree by Murdoch Books.

== Translations ==
- Japanese: Papa no Ki (パパの木). Translated by Ayako Komatsu. Artist House Publishers. 2002.
- Traditional Chinese: Shu Shang de Fuqin (樹上的父親). Translated by Hsueh Hui-yi. Wisdom Books. 2003.
- German: Erzähl mir, großer Baum... Translated by Holger Wolandt. Droemer Knaur. 2003.
- French: L'arbre du père. Translated by Anne Berton. Autrement. 2003.
- Swedish: Fader vår som bor i trädet. Translated by Eva Sjöstrand. Forum. 2004.
- Czech: Strom: v koruně naděje, v kořenech smutek. Translated by Jan Kozák. Jota. 2011.
- Italian: L'albero: una favola vera. Translated by Andrea Silvestri. Bompiani. 2011.
- Simplified Chinese: Shu Shang de Shouhu Tianshi (树上的守护天使). Translated by Jiang Kunyang. Volumes Publishing Company. 2015.

== Film adaptation ==
Our Father Who Art in the Tree has been adapted into a 2010 feature film entitled The Tree by writer/director Julie Bertuccelli and stars Charlotte Gainsbourg. It was filmed in Boonah, Queensland and is an official French/Australian co-production between Les Films du Poisson and Taylor Media, with Yaël Fogiel and Sue Taylor (Producer) as co-producers. The film was shown at the Chicago International Film Festival.
