= Shark net (disambiguation) =

A shark net is a submerged net placed around beaches to reduce shark attacks on swimmers.

Shark net may also refer to:

- The Shark Net, a memoir by Robert Drewe
  - The Shark Net, TV mini-series produced by Sue Taylor
