= MCorp =

MCorp, M-Corp, or M.Corp. may refer to:

- MCorp Bank, a Texas bank holding company, whose banks were acquired by Bank One Corporation
- "M-Corp", an episode of Red Dwarf
- M.Corp., an abbreviation for Municipal Corporation
