= Mechocracy =

- Red Dwarf episode
- Episode no.: Series 12; Episode 4
- Directed by: Doug Naylor
- Written by: Doug Naylor
- Original air date: 2 November 2017

Guest appearances
- Daniel Barker as Dispensing Machine 402 & Other Voices; Penelope Freeman as Dispensing Machine 403; Oliver Maltman as Other Dispensing Machines; David Ross as Talkie Toaster

Episode chronology
← Previous "Timewave"	Next → "M-Corp"
- Red Dwarf XII

"Mechocracy" is the fourth episode of Red Dwarf XII and the 71st in the series run. Originally broadcast on the British television channel Dave on 2 November 2017, it was made available early on 26 October 2017 on UKTV Play.

The machines aboard Red Dwarf grow concerned nobody has their interest in mind, and an election is held between Rimmer and Kryten to determine their new representative.

== Synopsis ==
Red Dwarf receives a supposed SOS call that actually turns out to be an "SOS virus", harmful malware that infects the computer and, forces the crew to abandon the ship, which has started drifting towards a black hole. As the crew pack their supplies before escaping, nearby vending machines ask if they will be included in the evacuation. The crew explain they have no intention of bringing them along, so the machines combine their total power to defeat the malware infecting Red Dwarf.

The machines go on strike. Rimmer (Chris Barrie) proposes to appoint himself as their new leader, mainly for the power the position would bring, so Kryten (Robert Llewellyn) decides to run against him in a democratic election held by the machines. Rimmer runs as a member of the "Lovely Fluffy Liberal Alliance Party" alongside Cat (Danny John-Jules), who he's blackmailing with the information that he needs reading glasses, whilst Kryten runs as a member of the "Independent Future Party" with Lister (Craig Charles), not wanting Rimmer to take control of the ship, as his voluntary running mate.

The election became dirty as Rimmer decides to run a smear campaign on Kryten, airing attack ads on Kryten's mental health concerning his time taking care of the dead crew of the Nova 5. Kryten fires back, airing similar attack ads calling into account Rimmer having killed himself, twice. After some debates, the election is tied; to put the odds in their favour, Kryten and a begrudging Lister travel to the garbage hold where Talkie Toaster (David Ross) has been residing for the last 25 years. Kryten narrowly wins, after Lister agrees to the toaster's demands.

By the next morning the crew are enjoying themselves, except for Rimmer, who Cat locked in the garbage hold alongside Talkie in retaliation.

== Production ==
Even though Talkie's voice actor, David Ross, had since retired from acting, he still lent his voice to the character he last played in 1991, recording his lines at a sound studio in his native Lancashire. "Mechocracy" marks the fifth time Daniel Barker has voiced a distinct character in an episode, putting him at equal standing with Red Dwarf alumni, Tony Hawks.

Doug Naylor had initial concerns bringing back vending machine-centric plots after Series X, but ultimately decided in favour of it as it aided the overall plot and humour of the episode.

== Reception ==
"Mechocracy" received positive reviews from critics and fans. Writing for Den of Geek, Mark Harrison referred to the episode as, "the first bonafide classic episode of the Dave era."

Sophie Davies of Cultbox praised the episode as a strong comeback from the prior episode Timewave, "[It] could have easily been plucked from a much earlier series, ‘Mechocracy’ is the best episode of Red Dwarf XII so far and one of the best of the show’s Dave era."
