= The Giraffe and the Pelly and Me =

1985 book by Roald Dahl

- First UK edition
- Author: Roald Dahl
- Illustrator: Quentin Blake
- Language: English
- Genre: Children's literature
- Published: 26 September 1985
- Publisher: Jonathan Cape
- Publication place: United Kingdom
- Pages: 32

The Giraffe and the Pelly and Me is a 1985 children's book written by Roald Dahl and illustrated by Quentin Blake. The plot follows a young boy named Billy who meets a giraffe, a pelican, and a monkey, who work as window cleaners.

Although the story is narrated in first-person by Billy, the word "Me" in the title refers to the monkey, who concludes every verse of his signature song with the phrase "the giraffe and the pelly and me".

== Plot ==
The story is told from the point of view of Billy, a young boy who has always dreamed of owning a sweet-shop. His ambition is strengthened by the fact that there is an abandoned three-storey building named The Grubber, an old English word for a sweet-shop, near where he lives. One day, he finds that the old building has been renovated and has become the head office for The Ladderless Window-Cleaning Company. Billy then meets its members: a Giraffe with an extendable neck; a Pelican, or "Pelly" as he is called by the others, who has a flexible upper beak; and a singing and dancing Monkey, all of whom he quickly befriends. Having only recently arrived in England, all the animals are finding it hard to acquire the right food to feed themselves. This includes fish for the Pelican, especially his favorite salmon; walnuts for the Monkey; and pink and purple tinkle-tinkle tree flowers for the Giraffe (this is all she can eat, as she happens to be a "Geraneous Giraffe"). Billy and the animals all band together when they receive a letter from the Duke of Hampshire asking them to clean the 676 windows of Hampshire House. Things go smoothly when they get there until, while cleaning the bedroom windows of Henrietta the Duchess, the Giraffe and the Monkey spot a burglar attempting to steal the Duchess's jewels. The Pelican then flies in and catches the burglar, holding him prisoner in his beak despite the burglar's attempt to shoot his way out with his gun (this makes a hole in the Pelican's beak, but the Duke assures him that the chauffeur can patch it up). Soon the police arrive to arrest the burglar, whom the Chief of Police identifies as the "Cobra", one of the world's most dangerous cat burglars. As a reward for retrieving the Duchess's jewels, the Duke invites The Ladderless Window-Cleaning Company to live on his estate as his personal helpers. Since he is the owner of the only tinkle-tinkle tree plantation in England, as well as thousands of walnut trees and an enormous salmon river (the River Hamp), all three starving animals have found the answer to their dilemma. Billy's dreams also come true because the Giraffe, Pelican, and Monkey will no longer need the Grubber building; with a little help from the Duke, the Grubber is revived into the most fantastic sweet shop for miles around (among the sweets it sells are Liplickers and Plushnuggets from Norway, one of the “lands of the midnight sun”), and the story ends with Billy running the shop and The Ladderless Window-Cleaning Company continuing their business (and the Pelican's beak having been fixed). Billy gives each of his new friends special gifts: to the Giraffe, a bag of Glumptious Globgobblers, to the Monkey, a bag of Devil’s Drenchers, to the Pelican, a bag of Pishlets, and to the Duke, a bag of Scarlet Scorchdroppers. The Monkey, before leaving with the others, sings a little song to Billy (thus the ending).

== Stage adaptation ==
The book was adapted and staged at the Little Angel Theatre, London in December 2015. Andrew Pulver of The Guardian described the play as "a perfect Christmas treat for children."

== Relations to other Roald Dahl books ==
- When Billy reopens The Grubber he chooses to sell sweets made by the Willy Wonka company, which features in Dahl's earlier novels Charlie and the Chocolate Factory and Charlie and the Great Glass Elevator. In Charlie and the Chocolate Factory, a person who sucks rainbow drops can spit in only six different colors; there are seven in The Giraffe and the Pelly and Me.
- The Monkey, in both appearance and diet, bears a strong resemblance to Muggle-Wump, a monkey from two of Dahl's earlier books: The Enormous Crocodile and The Twits.
- Among the sweets that Billy sells in The Grubber are Fizzwinkles, from China. They are referenced in one of Dahl's earlier novels, The BFG, except there they are spelled "Fizzwinkel".

== Editions ==
- ISBN 0-224-06493-2 (hardcover, 2003)
- ISBN 0-224-02999-1 (hardcover, 1985)
- ISBN 0-14-131127-4 (paperback, 2004)
- ISBN 0-14-056819-0 (paperback, 2004)
- ISBN 0-14-036527-3 (paperback, 1993)
- ISBN 0-14-050566-0 (paperback, 1987)
