= Muggle (disambiguation) =

A muggle is a person without magical abilities in the Harry Potter series.

Otherwise, it has been used in a number of groups and fields to refer to an outsider, non-initiate, or one lacking basic knowledge of the field.

Muggle may also refer to:

- "Muggles", a 1928 tune recorded by Louis Armstrong and His Orchestra (the word originating from a slang term for cannabis)
- Muggles, a character in the children's book The Gammage Cup
- Muggles, a race in the book The Legend of Rah and the Muggles
- A slang term for cannabis (users are "muggle-heads")
- A person who is not privy to the game of Geocaching

== See also ==
- Muggletonianism
- Muggle-Wump
