= Red Dwarf IV =

Series of television

- Starring: Chris Barrie; Craig Charles; Danny John-Jules; Robert Llewellyn; Hattie Hayridge
- No. of episodes: 6

Release
- Original network: BBC2
- Original release: 14 February – 21 March 1991

Series chronology
- ← Previous; Red Dwarf III Next → Red Dwarf V

Red Dwarf IV is the fourth series of the British science fiction sitcom Red Dwarf. It consisted of six episodes and was broadcast on UK television channel BBC2 between 14 February and 21 March 1991.

The series follows the life of technician Dave Lister (Craig Charles), who is the only survivor of an accident on the spaceship Red Dwarf, and the last survivor of the human race, three million years in the future, and his shipmates, a holographic reproduction of his dead bunkmate and boss, Arnold Rimmer (Chris Barrie), a sapient Cat (Danny John-Jules) who is a result of three million years' evolution, sanitation droid Kryten (Robert Llewellyn), and the ship's computer Holly (Hattie Hayridge).

== Production and writing ==
Due to the old studio in Manchester undergoing refurbishment, the recording of Series IV moved to Shepperton Studios in Surrey. This meant that rehearsals could take place on set, rather than at the off-site television rehearsal rooms in Acton. Outside locations used included Kempton Park Steam Engines for a space station in "Justice".

Grant Naylor Productions took over production of the show from Paul Jackson Productions. Paul Jackson retained a minority share in GNP. The episodes were directed by Ed Bye, with Jackon standing in uncredited as director for the audience record of "White Hole" due to the unavailability of Bye.

The episodes were all written by Grant and Naylor. Portions of the episode "White Hole" were derived from parts of the Red Dwarf novel Better Than Life.

== Casting ==
The opening episode, "Camille" features a character, Camille, who appears as a desirable partner for each member of the crew. Two of the regular cast's real-life partners — Judy Pascoe and Suzanne Rhatigan — were used as the versions seen by Kryten and Lister respectively. The version that Rimmer sees is played by Francesca Folan.

"Meltdown" is set on a planet hosting a wax droid theme park, and many wax droids of celebrities make appearances, including warm-up man Tony Hawks playing Caligua; and Clayton Mark, an Elvis impersonator,

== Broadcast and reception ==
The broadcast was not as originally intended; the BBC had decided to start off with the romantic story of "Camille" for Valentine's Day, while the outbreak of the Gulf War affected the series' running order, thus both the anti-war "Meltdown" and heroic Ace Rimmer's "Dimension Jump" were almost postponed.

William Thomas, reviewing the series for its DVD release in 2004 for Empire, gave it 4 out of 5 stars and said: "Cherish this DVD, for Red Dwarf virtually pole-vaulted the shark immediately after this fourth series."

Writing in 2015, Den of Geek ranked Red Dwarf IV the fifth best of the then nine full seasons of the show, saying that "Though series four lacks for really iconic episodes, it does contain several of the moments that propelled Dwarf fully to cult status", mentioning Ace Rimmer in "Dimension Jump" and scenes in "DNA", "Meltdown" and "White Hole".

In 2017, Sophie Davies, writing for CultBox, noted that the Red Dwarf IV is the endpoint of a move from character comedy based focused on Lister and Rimmer to a broader ensemble comedy. She wrote "This is by no means a bad thing, as it's possibly the most gag-packed series so far, but if you were a fan of the bleak, lonely atmosphere of early Red Dwarf you might feel like the show has lost something during its change of style."

== Episodes ==
No. overall	No. in series	Title	Directed by	Written by	Original release date	Prod. code	Viewers (millions)
19	1	"Camille"	Ed Bye	Rob Grant and Doug Naylor	14 February 1991	4	4.32
Lister helps Kryten to break his programming so that he can lie and insult. Later, when Kryten rescues a mechanoid named Camille, the sole survivor from a crashed spaceship, she appears to be his perfect mechanoid partner. However, Rimmer and Lister also see their fantasy women when they see Camille. Secrets, lies and broken hearts ensue, along with an ending similar to Lister's favourite film, Casablanca.
20	2	"DNA"	Ed Bye	Rob Grant and Doug Naylor	21 February 1991	6	3.78
A mysterious derelict spacecraft containing extremely advanced technology, perhaps alien, docks with Red Dwarf. On board they discover a DNA modifier, a genetic altering machine that can metamorphose organic life, but havoc ensues as Lister gets turned into a chicken and then a hamster, Kryten becomes human, and a curry monster is created from Lister's vindaloo.
21	3	"Justice"	Ed Bye	Rob Grant and Doug Naylor	28 February 1991	1	3.97
The crew pick up an escape pod bearing a woman's name. There is also the possibility it may in fact be a deranged bio-mechanical killer on his way to "Justice World", a deep space penal station. They decide to go to "Justice World" to discover the contents of the pod. Things become worse when a justice scan reveals that Rimmer is guilty of the radioactive disaster that wiped out the entire crew of Red Dwarf, equal to 1,167 separate counts of second-degree murder, and he is promptly convicted and sentenced.
22	4	"White Hole"	Ed Bye and (uncredited) Paul Jackson	Rob Grant and Doug Naylor	7 March 1991	5	4.41
Holly has her intelligence briefly restored to an IQ of 12,368, but a side effect of this is that her run-time is reduced to minutes. Holly promptly switches herself off, leaving Red Dwarf with no lighting or maneuvering capability. It's back to basics for the crew and they must resort to their own resourcefulness to survive.
23	5	"Dimension Jump"	Ed Bye	Rob Grant and Doug Naylor	14 March 1991	2	4.10
The crew meet a parallel dimension version of Rimmer. Arnold "Ace" Rimmer is a dashing daredevil test pilot for the space corps, and he has been assigned to test-pilot a ship that can travel through dimensions, so he can meet different versions of himself. He enters our dimension to meet our Rimmer, the weaselly cowardly version, who has gone on a fishing holiday with the rest of the crew.
24	6	"Meltdown"	Ed Bye	Rob Grant and Doug Naylor	21 March 1991	3	3.56
Kryten uses a prototype "matter paddle" to teleport the crew to a nearby planet with an S3 (or Earth-like) atmosphere. They discover the planet has been visited by humans years previously, who populated the planet with "wax droids"—animated wax works of famous characters from Earth's history including Albert Einstein, Marilyn Monroe, Gandhi, Winnie the Pooh, Mother Teresa and Elvis Presley, who have now gone berserk, and are at war.

== Home media release ==
The series was released in October and November 1992 on VHS, and on DVD in 2004. The home video releases use the broadcast order of the episodes rather than the originally intended order.
