= Roly-Poly Bird =

Fictional character in books by Roald Dahl

The Roly-Poly Bird is a fictional character in several children's books by Roald Dahl. He appears in The Enormous Crocodile (1978), The Twits (1980), and the poetry collection Dirty Beasts (1983).

== Description ==
The Roly-Poly Bird appears in a number of children's books by Roald Dahl – in two cases alongside Muggle-Wump the monkey. The Roly-Poly Bird is large, with fantastically coloured tailfeathers, and in Quentin Blake's illustrations has a blue body, a long neck and a crest on his head - rather like a peacock. He nests in an orange tree at least once, and his favourite foods are berries. He speaks two languages, Zulu and English, and is as intelligent as a monkey. He provides light relief to the reader.

== Appearances ==
=== The Enormous Crocodile ===
In this story the Roly-Poly Bird is in his native land. The Crocodile boasts to many characters that he is venturing into the nearby village to eat human children; but the Roly-Poly Bird is the only one that he does not permit to warn him against it before rearing up and snapping at him – pulling out some of his tailfeathers in the process. Thereafter the Roly-Poly Bird flies after him and calls a warning when he is about to catch a little girl at a fair.

=== The Twits ===
In this book, Muggle-Wump and his monkey family have been forced, on pain of corporal punishment, to stand on their heads for hours on end in preparation for a possible circus act, while birds are caught in the glue-smeared branches of a tree in the Twits' garden and then cooked into pie. When the Roly-Poly Bird arrives he, via his knowledge of languages, translates the Muggle-Wumps' cries of warning and so deters the birds from sitting in the tree. He is himself prevented in turn from becoming stuck to the monkeys' cage when Mr Twit smears glue on its bars, and conveys warning of this to the other birds. When the Twits leave to buy guns as a last resort, he and the Muggle-Wumps use the same glue to trick the Twits into attaching themselves, upside-down, to their floor. The Roly-Poly Bird then carries the Muggle-Wumps home to their native Africa.

The Roly-Poly Bird also makes a cameo in the mid-credit scene of the 2025 film adaptation as a resident of Loompaland.

=== Dirty Beasts ===
In this story, it is revealed that the Roly-Poly Bird has the power to transform into a giant toad and an even more giant snail. In "The Toad and The Snail", the two characters of the title are the same creature, magically transformed from one to the other when the giant Toad jumps with a small boy on his back into France, becomes the Snail to escape the amphibian-hungry Frenchmen and becomes the Roly-Poly Bird so that he can escape to England when the Frenchmen also express interest in eating the snail. He is again shown as a character that "saves the day".
