= The Dune (film) =

- Film poster
- Directed by: Yossi Aviram
- Written by: Yossi Aviram
- Produced by: Yael Fogiel; Laetitia Gonzalez; Amir Harel; Ayelet Kait
- Starring: Niels Arestrup; Lior Ashkenazi; Guy Marchand; Emma de Caunes
- Cinematography: Antoine Héberlé
- Edited by: Anne Weil; François Gédigier
- Music by: Avi Belleli
- Production company: Les Films du Poisson
- Distributed by: Le Pacte (France)
- Release dates: 22 September 2013 (San Sebastián); 13 August 2014 (France)
- Running time: 87 minutes
- Countries: France; Israel
- Languages: French; Hebrew
- Budget: $3 million
- Box office: $58.000

The Dune (original title: La Dune) is a 2013 French-Israeli drama film directed by Yossi Aviram.

== Plot ==
A man without identity papers who doesn't speak a word is found on a beach of the Landes. A specialized inspector in the search for missing trying to unravel the mystery.

== The Film's Development ==
The DVD extras and the film credits reveal that the film is based on the true story of Reoven Vardi (also known as Reuven Vardi, architect, notably the designer of the logo for Historical Monuments) and Pierluigi Rotili, who live in Paris.

The documentary De vieux garçons (in English, Paris Return, also directed by Yossi Aviram), released five years before the film, allows for a parallel with the movie. The themes of leaving one’s home country and returning to it are thus the pillars of both works.

== Cast ==
- Niels Arestrup as Reuven
- Lior Ashkenazi as Hanoch
- Guy Marchand as Paolo
- Emma de Caunes as Fabienne
- Moni Moshonov as Fogel
- Mathieu Amalric as Moreau
- Jean-Quentin Châtelain as Audiberti
- Dana Adini as Yaël
- Jean-Paul Larriau as Rigodot
- Lorenzo Santos as Reggiani
- Raymonde Bronstein as Madame Bertier
- Christian Ameri as Ferral
- Julien Villa as Eustache
- Tami Meiri Eitan as Yona
- Hortense Pol as Laetitia
- Shmil Ben Ari

== Accolades ==
Award	Category	Recipient	Result
Haifa International Film Festival	Best Debut	Yossi Aviram	Won
San Francisco International Film Festival	New Directors Prize	Yossi Aviram	Nominated
