= Muggle-Wump =

Fictional character in some of Roald Dahl's books

"Muggle-Wump" the monkey is a fictional character in some of Roald Dahl's books for children, and "the Muggle-Wumps" are his family. A Muggle-Wump appears in The Enormous Crocodile and there is a Muggle-Wump with a family in The Twits. A Muggle-Wump lookalike (shown in Quentin Blake's illustrations) appears in The Giraffe and the Pelly and Me. The first two stories have him almost as a symbol of retribution to the antagonists of the overall tale, whereas in the last one he is happy and safe.

His family members are the Muggle-Wumps. They appear in The Twits.

== The Enormous Crocodile ==
The Muggle-Wump of The Enormous Crocodile, after reasoning with the wily reptile that it is wrong to eat little children, loses his temper and very nearly his life when the Crocodile bites into his tree to catch him. He gets revenge, however, by following the Enormous Crocodile and thwarting his chances at catching a child when they are about to come near him. In doing this he angers the Enormous Crocodile into wanting to eat more children, only to be thwarted by the Roly-Poly Bird (another recurring character in Dahl's books) and Trunky the Elephant who hurls the Enormous Crocodile into the sun, killing him.

== The Twits ==
The Muggle-Wump in this story has a wife and children, and is subject to animal cruelty at the hands of Mr. and Mrs. Twit, two retired circus trainers. They force the Muggle-Wumps to balance on their heads, one on top of the other, or else stand and walk on their hands, all at the peril of feeling Mrs. Twit's "beastly [walking-]stick". Mr. Twit smears the Dead Tree with glue to trap birds for his favourite dish of bird pie. When the monkeys shout warnings, the birds do not understand their language and so are always caught by Mr. and Mrs. Twit.

He is assisted by the Roly-Poly Bird, a friend of Muggle-Wump who is holidaying in England. The Roly-Poly Bird can speak both the African language of the monkeys and the English of the native birds. The Muggle-Wumps rescue the latter and escape from their cage whilst the Twits are away. The monkeys and the birds attach all the Twits' living-room furniture to the ceiling with the sticky glue used by Mr. Twit. They then, on the Twits' return, have two birds drop some glue onto the couple's heads. Upon entering their house, the Twits presume that their living room has turned upside down and that they must therefore be standing on the ceiling, so they stand on their heads and become stuck. Muggle-Wump and his family are then able to return home with the help of the Roly-Poly Bird, who flies them all the way back to Africa, presumably to live happily ever after.

=== The Muggle-Wumps ===
The Muggle-Wumps are the family of the Muggle-Wump in the story. They consist of Muggle-Wump's wife and their two children.

== The Giraffe and the Pelly and Me ==
Possibly not a Muggle-Wump at all, but said to resemble them, this monkey is referred to in the title "The Giraffe and the Pelly and Me". He is a window-washer by trade, and has a very good working relationship with his partners: the Giraffe whose neck can stretch out to any length, and the Pelican ("Pelly"), the top half of whose bill can collapse inwards like a tape-measure. The Giraffe is the ladder, the Pelican (with his deeply pouched bill) is the bucket for the water, and the monkey cleans the windows with a cloth. He is also an adept singer and dancer.

Whilst he is working for the Duke of Hampshire, the Monkey and the Giraffe notice an armed burglar stealing the Duchess' jewellery, whereupon the Pelican traps the thief in the pouch of his enormous bill and later gives him to the police. The Duke then allows the monkey and his friends to live on the grounds of his wealthy estate, and their house is reverted into its former function: a sweetshop, much to the delight of the narrator. The monkey then closes the story with a song.
