= The Enormous Crocodile =

1978 picture book by Roald Dahl

- First edition
- Author: Roald Dahl
- Audio read by: Stephen Fry; Roger Blake (on the CD and audio cassette releases)
- Illustrator: Quentin Blake
- Cover artist: Quentin Blake
- Language: English
- Series: Roald Dahl
- Genre: Children's story and picture book
- Publisher: Jonathan Cape (London)
- Publication date: 1 November 1978
- Publication place: United Kingdom
- Media type: Print (quarto hardback, paperback)
- Pages: 40 (approx.)
- ISBN: 0-224-01579-6
- OCLC: 4620532
- LC Class: PZ7.D1515 En 1978
- Preceded by: Danny, the Champion of the World
- Followed by: The Twits

The Enormous Crocodile (first published on 1 November 1978) is a British children's story, written by British author Roald Dahl and illustrated by Quentin Blake. A picture book written for younger readers than Dahl's other works, the story tells of a hungry crocodile who aims to eat human children via using various, not-quite-impenetrable disguises.

== Synopsis ==
The story begins in Africa in the "biggest brownest muddiest river", where the enormous crocodile (the title character) is telling a smaller crocodile, called the "not-so-big one", that he wants to leave his muddy home behind and eat a real human child for lunch. The not-so-big crocodile objects, because real children taste "tough and chewy and nasty and bitter" in his opinion compared to fish, and because of what happened the last time the enormous crocodile tried to eat human children. The enormous crocodile leaves the big, deep, muddy river anyway, and announces his intention to first Humpy-Rumpy the hippopotamus on the river bank, then Trunky the elephant in the jungle, then Muggle Wump the monkey in his nut tree, and finally the Roly-Poly Bird in his orange tree. Humpy-Rumpy suspects that the enormous crocodile is "going to do something horrid." Grinning, the enormous crocodile responds: "I'm going to fill my hungry empty tummy with something yummy yummy yummy yummy!" The four jungle animals are all feeling horrified and disgusted with the enormous crocodile, thereby insulting him on the spot, hoping that he will fail his task miserably and be killed, after which the reptile briefly and unsuccessfully attacks first Muggle-Wump in his nut tree and Roly-Poly Bird himself in his (newly-built) nest in the orange tree.

First, the enormous crocodile walks over to a coconut tree forest near an African town, where he cleverly disguises himself as a small coconut tree using several fallen tree branches as well as several fallen coconuts, hoping to eat Toto and Mary, siblings who happen to live in the town itself. However, the enormous crocodile is annoyingly caught by Humpy-Rumpy from the muddy river bank, who catches the enormous crocodile with his giant head, and sends him "tumbling and skidding over the ground".

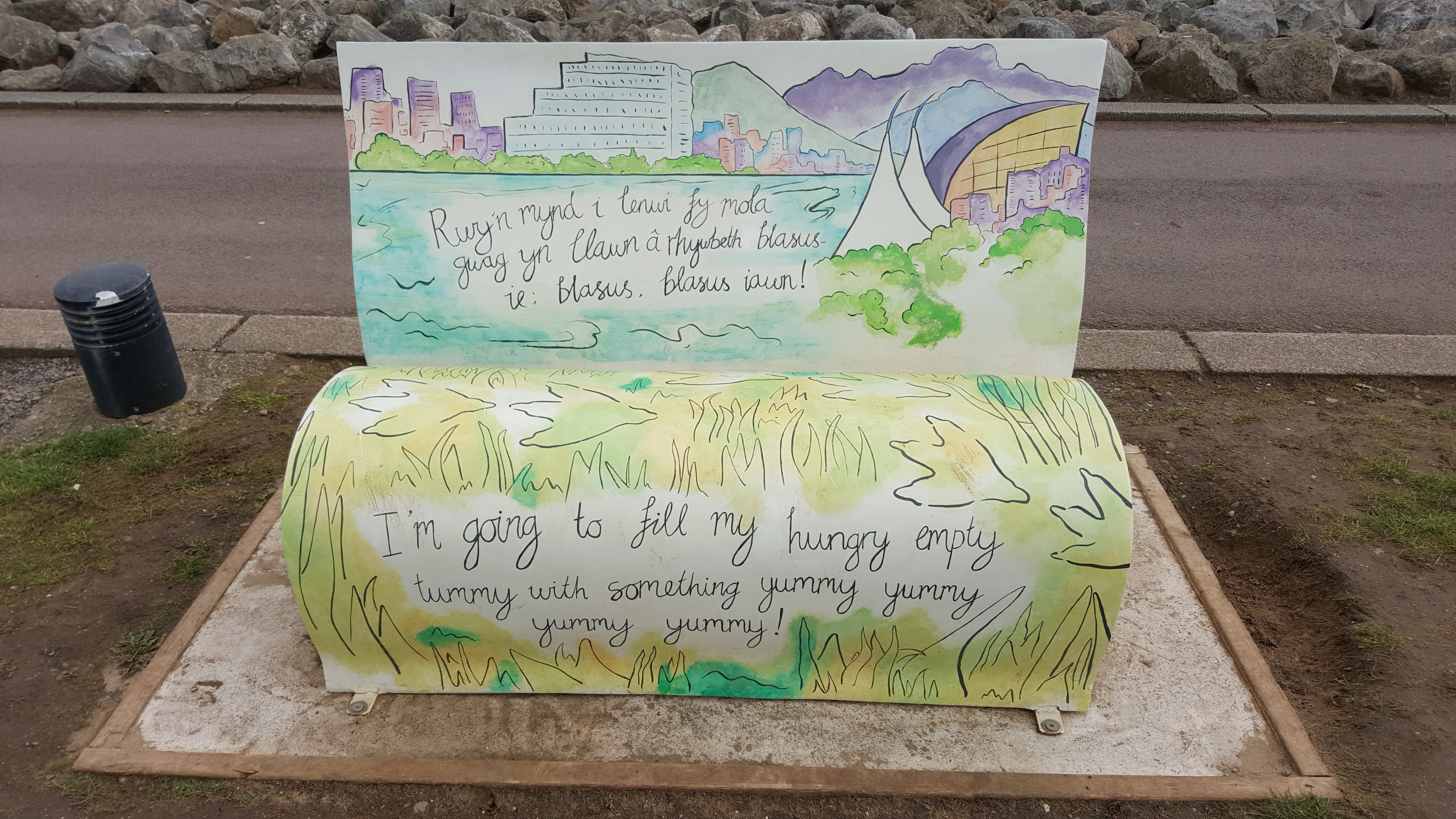
Words spoken by the crocodile in the book, "I'm going to fill my hungry empty tummy with something yummy yummy yummy yummy!", displayed in the Dahl sculpture in Cardiff

Next, the enormous crocodile walks to a playground located outside a school. Using a big log, he disguises himself as a "see-saw", hoping to eat an entire class of children who want to ride on what they think is a "new see-saw" itself. However, despite an older girl telling the other children that it is "a rather knobbly sort of a see-saw", the enormous crocodile is just disturbed on the spot by Muggle-Wump, who tells the whole class of children to "run, run, run" and that the enormous crocodile is not really a real see-saw and that he just wants to eat them up.

Eventually, the enormous crocodile creeps over to a busy funfair, where he eventually sees a "big roundabout", operated only by a human man whom he does not know at all. When nobody is looking, the now hungry enormous crocodile cheekily sandwiches himself between a brown lion and a yellow dragon (with a red tongue sticking out of its mouth), hoping to eat a little girl named Jill who wants to ride on him. However, the enormous crocodile is confronted by Roly-Poly Bird from the jungle, who tells Jill and the other children that the enormous crocodile is real and not wooden, hence why he came "from the river" and wants to eat them up.

Refusing to give up on his seemingly impossible task, the enormous crocodile finally goes to "the picnic place", located in a tropical woodland just outside the town which has trees and bushes all around it. Nobody is there, so the enormous crocodile picks up a bunch of beautiful colored flowers with his front legs and then arranges it on top of one of the tables in the area. From exactly the same table, the (now very hungry) enormous crocodile sneakily takes away one of the place's long benches and hides the long bench itself in one of the many clumps of bushes in the area before disguising himself as a wooden four-legged bench using all four of his stiff legs. Eventually, four siblings ("two boys and two girls") who are all going out "on a picnic together", show up and want to sit at the table the enormous crocodile is hiding at due to the flowers. However, the enormous crocodile is annoyingly discovered by Trunky from the jungle and tells the four siblings that the enormous crocodile is not a bench and that he wants to eat them up.

With a chance to save the day, Trunky marches through the jungle into the Picnic Place. Once Trunky is standing beside the table with the bunch of colored flowers on top of it, he angrily picks the enormous crocodile himself up by his tail with his trunk before telling the enormous crocodile that he and all the other jungle inhabitants have "all had quite enough of (his) clever tricks". Then, Trunky starts swinging the enormous crocodile "round and round in the air" by his tail, slowly at first, then a bit "faster", then a lot faster, and finally very fast, before eventually throwing him up into the sky with his trunk. The dizzy enormous crocodile is sent flying at speed through the air, through Earth's stratosphere, and through the Universe. The crocodile zooms past the Moon, he whizzes past all the other planets, and finally past the many twinkling stars. Eventually, ("with the most tremendous BANG",) the enormous crocodile crashes "headfirst into the hot hot Sun" in the middle of the Solar System, where he gets "sizzled up like a sausage", killing him.

== 2023 Revisions ==
In February 2023, Puffin Books, a division of Penguin Books, announced they would be re-writing portions of many of Roald Dahl's children's novels, changing the language to, in the publisher's words, "ensure that it can continue to be enjoyed by readers of all ages today". At least five changes were made in The Enormous Crocodile, including permanently deleting the word fat, changing the word ugly to horrid, and changing the line boys and girls to children.

== Style and publication date ==
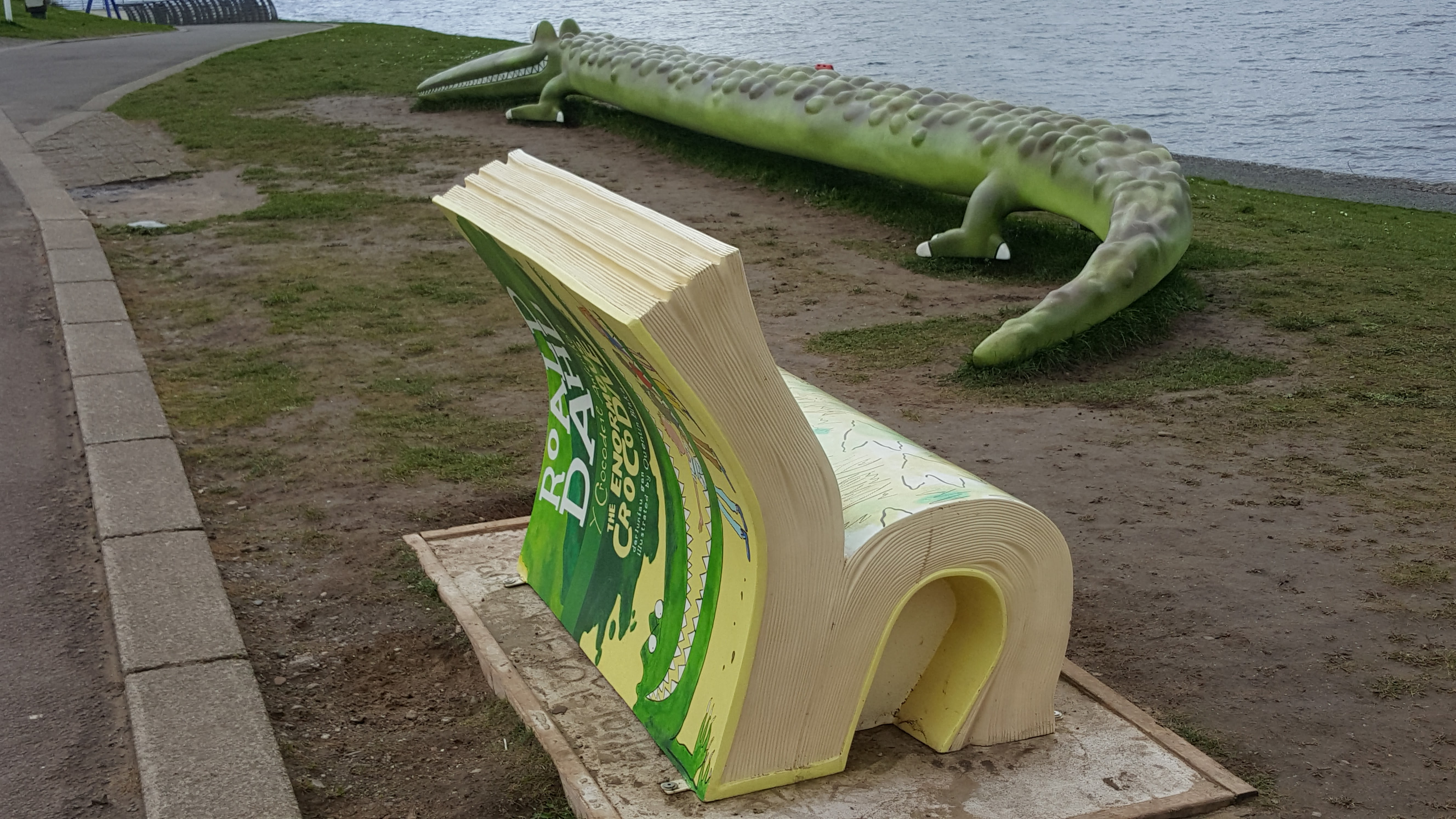
Crocodile bench and chair sculpture overlooking Cardiff Bay depicting The Enormous Crocodile

The Enormous Crocodile is in the style of a picture book in contrast to Roald Dahl's other story books, illustrated by Quentin Blake. It was published on 1 November 1978.

== Connections to other Roald Dahl Stories ==
- Muggle-Wump the monkey also appears in The Twits, where he is accompanied by a whole family of Muggle-Wumps. A monkey which looks like Blake's illustration of exactly the same character also appears in The Giraffe and the Pelly and Me.
- The Roly-Poly Bird makes a surprising appearance in The Twits and he can also be seen in Dirty Beasts.
- A recipe outlining how to make your own edible Enormous Crocodile appears in Roald Dahl's Revolting Recipes.

== Adaptations ==
=== Audio ===
The accompanying audiobook of The Enormous Crocodile was narrated by Roger Blake and was released on magnetic audio cassette. The 2016 version released on compact disc and digital MP3 download was only narrated by Stephen Fry.

=== Animation ===
The story was adapted into a direct to video animation by Abbey Broadcast Communications in 1990, which was released through Abbey Home Entertainment. It was a faithful adaption of the original story, which was told through Blake's audiobook recordings against animations in the style of Quentin Blake's illustrations. Re-releases from 1997 onwards redubbed Blake's narration with that of children's television presenter Dave Benson Phillips. The 2005 DVD release of the special (bundled with other Roald Dahl material) reinstated the original narration.

=== Theatre ===
A musical adaptation of The Enormous Crocodile was staged at Leeds Playhouse from December 2023 to January 2024, as well as in Regent's Park Open Air Theatre, London between mid-May and early June 2024.
