= Cured (Red Dwarf) =

- Red Dwarf episode
- Episode no.: Series 12; Episode 1
- Directed by: Doug Naylor
- Written by: Doug Naylor
- Original air date: 12 October 2017

Guest appearances
- Adrian Lukis as Professor Telford; Ryan Gage as Hitler; Chloe Hawkins as Messalina; Callum Coates as Stalin; Philippe Spall as Vlad the Impaler

Episode chronology
← Previous "Can of Worms"	Next → "Siliconia"
- Red Dwarf XII

"Cured" is the first episode of Red Dwarf XII and the 68th in the series run. Originally broadcast on the British television channel Dave on 12 October 2017, it was made available early on 5 October 2017 on UKTV Play.

The crew happen upon an abandoned research facility where several infamous figures from history reside, supposedly "cured" of their evil.

== Synopsis ==
The crew play a game of poker, with Lister (Craig Charles) attempting to teach Cat (Danny John-Jules) how to have a proper poker face, but Cat failing to understand. Kryten (Robert Llewellyn) interrupts to report on a resource-rich station to scavenge, which the crew head off towards onboard Starbug, which requires an elaborate start-up sequence to work due to its state of disrepair. A powerful sandstorm leaves them temporarily stranded there.

The crew venture through the base, encountering "cryobooths" bearing the names of Messalina (Chloe Hawkins), Vlad the Impaler (Philippe Spall), Joseph Stalin (Callum Coates), and Adolf Hitler (Ryan Gage). They are then greeted by Professor Shaul Telford, who reveals that the occupants were in stasis and their arrival has triggered their release, but that they have been cured of their formerly psychopathic ways. They are introduced to these infamous figures over dinner. Surprisingly, they prove to be kind and pleasant, and claim to be completely reformed. Lister gets to know Hitler, and the pair perform "The Happy Wanderer" on guitar. The rest of the crew pull Lister aside to chastise him for socializing with Hitler, but are all knocked unconscious and put into separate torturous scenarios.

After escaping from their traps, the crew meet up and accuse the base occupants of trying to kill them. They decide to test everybody using a device that scans who among them is a psychopath, which returns the results that of them two are psychopaths, one being the Cat, due to his inherently selfish and vain personality, and the other being Professor Telford. Telford reveals himself as the base's real patient, with the other occupants having been his android caretakers, who he reprogrammed. Telford holds the crew at gunpoint, but due to not knowing how to start Starbug, offers to take the Cat with him. Cat, seemingly, agrees and requests a gun to kill the other three with, only to immediately kill Telford with it. He credits his deception to his newly-learned poker face.

== Production ==
Originally, "Africa" by Toto was going to be used in place of "The Happy Wanderer" during their guitar performance, but the rights were denied because Lister would be playing it alongside Hitler. Early drafts of the script originally had Professor Telford be revealed as the real Hitler, though that was scrapped in subsequent rewrites.

== Reception ==
"Cured" was met with positive reviews from critics and fans.
