= Red Dwarf: The Promised Land =

British television film

- Prerelease poster for the television special
- Based on: Red Dwarf by Rob Grant; Doug Naylor
- Written by: Doug Naylor
- Directed by: Doug Naylor
- Starring: Chris Barrie; Craig Charles; Danny John-Jules; Robert Llewellyn; Norman Lovett; Ray Fearon
- Music by: Paul Farrer; Howard Goodall (Note: Goodall wrote the theme song, used in all episodes of the television series)
- Country of origin: United Kingdom
- Original language: English

Production
- Executive producers: Christine Langan; Doug Naylor
- Producer: Richard Naylor
- Running time: 87 minutes
- Production companies: Baby Cow Productions; Grant Naylor Productions

Original release
- Network: Dave
- Release: 9 April 2020

Related
- "Skipper"; Red Dwarf XII

Red Dwarf: The Promised Land is a 2020 British science-fiction comedy television special and the thirteenth instalment of the British science-fiction sitcom, Red Dwarf.

The special sees the Red Dwarf crew of Dave Lister (Craig Charles), Arnold Rimmer (Chris Barrie), the Cat (Danny John-Jules) and Kryten (Robert Llewellyn) face-off against Rodon (Ray Fearon), the leader of a band of feral cats, who has pledged to annihilate all those who do not worship him as their god.

== Plot ==
A fleet of warships are helmed by the 'felis sapiens', under the tyrannical rule of Rodon (Ray Fearon), the ruthless feral cat leader who has vowed to wipe out all cats who worship anyone but him. Three cat clerics (Tom Bennett, Mandeep Dhillon and Lucy Pearman) are to be executed for this crime, but manage to escape. They steal a shuttle and set course for their 'birthplace' to find their god. Meanwhile, Dave Lister (Craig Charles) has spent weeks going through the areas of the ship that he has not investigated since he left stasis, including the cargo bays where amongst other things he finds the reboot disc for Holly, the ship's computer who was lost years earlier. Booting it up, they discover that Holly (Norman Lovett) has been restored from his original startup file, and fails to recognise the crew. After discovering that the ship is all but abandoned and serves no logistical purpose, Holly follows his pre-programmed instructions to dispose of the ship by destroying it. Unable to convince him otherwise, Lister, Kryten (Robert Llewellyn), Rimmer (Chris Barrie) and Cat (Danny John-Jules) all flee in Starbug to find a new ship.

They eventually stumble upon a ship called the Iron Star, a derelict vessel outfitted with technology that is far superior to that of Red Dwarf. Immediately they discover a new form of hologrammatic projection technology called 'Diamond Light', which is more powerful than 'Hard Light', giving holograms abilities akin to superheroes, merging hard light projections with soft light projections. Deciding to ignore all the safety precautions, Rimmer has his own program converted to Diamond Light, giving him amazing powers and choosing his superhero name as "The Mighty Light", but after a few minutes he shuts down. He discovers that by recklessly using the technology before running safety tests, he has destroyed his Light Bee's battery, which now only has a few minutes of power and thus he can only exist if he is plugged into a mains power supply. Exploring the ship more, they stumble upon the three cat clerics who instantly recognise Lister as their god. Lister tries to set things right, but Kryten advises against it as their faith is all they have. The clerics reveal they have fled from Rodon who seeks them and the Anubis Stone, a mystical stone wielding great power; however, Kryten quickly determines that the stone is actually polished beetle dung.

Rodon arrives to take the Anubis Stone, quickly departing back to his battlecruiser where he orders the Iron Star be fired upon. The Dwarfers and the three clerics all flee back to Starbug and leave before the destruction of the Iron Star, but damage taken by the debris causes them to crash land onto a desert moon. Rodon's ship catches up with them and gives chase, forcing them to hide in a sandstorm, only to end up trapped underground. Looking for help, Rimmer, who has become a black-and-white low energy setting, contacts Holly and convinces him to upload the last saved back-up files of the original Holly into his system, thus restoring his memories and previous 'computer-senile' personality. In an attempt to help them, Holly launches a mining torpedo which destroys the entire moon, throwing Starbug clear in the shockwave. Regrouping on Red Dwarf, they learn that Rodon and his crew are on the ship, and have come to return the Anubis Stone, seeing it as worthless. Before leaving, he leaves a bomb aboard Red Dwarf to kill them all.

Lister realises that the Anubis Stone's beetle dung shell is a top layer, and removes it to reveal the real Stone which is a source of immense power. Transferring this power to Rimmer reengages his Diamond Light form, and with seconds to spare Rimmer takes the bomb out into space to detonate harmlessly. Lister then leads an attack against Rodon, where he and Rimmer create a laser pointer aimed at Rodon so his own people attack him, causing his ship to lose control and hit an asteroid, destroying it and all aboard. Looking to reboot Kryten, who has been serving as Rimmer's power supply and was visibly in disrepair throughout the adventure in need of a service, they discover that his system is locked up and he cannot recharge. In order to save Kryten, Rimmer forgoes his superpowers and uses the Anubis Stone to restore Kryten back to life. The Dwarfers return the clerics to the Cat Fleet, where they thank Lister for showing them the true legend they should be following, revealing they now worship Rimmer as a god. The ships part ways and the Dwarfers return home.

== Cast ==
- Chris Barrie as Arnold Rimmer, Dave Lister's neurotic bunkmate, resurrected as a hologram following his death in the show's first episode.
- Craig Charles as Dave Lister, the slobbish last human alive following his imprisonment in stasis for 3 million years.
- Danny John-Jules as Cat, a self-obsessed fashionista and the last cat to remain aboard Red Dwarf following the race's religious wars.
- Robert Llewellyn as Kryten, a mechanoid with a love of menial housework.
- Norman Lovett as Holly, the supercomputer originally aboard Red Dwarf possessing an IQ of 6,000; rebooted by the crew, Holly lacks his former memories and personality, and gives the crew 7 days to abandon the ship.
- Ray Fearon as Rodon, the ruthless leader of the feral cats and antagonist of the film.
- Tom Bennett as Brother Sol, a cleric being hunted by Rodon.
- Mandeep Dhillon as Sister Luna, a cat cleric being hunted by Rodon.
- Lucy Pearman as Sister Peanut, a cat cleric being hunted by Rodon; previously mute, she regains her ability to speak once encountering Lister.
- Al Roberts as Count Ludo, Rodon's sycophantic lackey.

== Marketing ==
In late May 2019, in a radio interview, Llewellyn stated that a thirteenth series of the television show was happening and in June of that year, John-Jules stated that it was expected to be wrapped up by the end of 2019. However, in October 2019, UKTV announced that a 90-minute feature-length special would be produced instead, to be filmed from December 2019 to January 2020, with location filming scheduled for November. Three 60-minute documentaries were also announced to accompany it, intended to act as a retrospective of all previous twelve series.

The main characters on the April 2020 cover of SFX; from left to right, top to bottom: Cat (John-Jules), Lister (Charles), Rimmer (Barrie), and Kryten (Llewellyn)

In January 2020, the first publicity photos of the special were released, with Fearon revealed as the first confirmed actor outside the show regulars, portraying Rodon, the "leader of the feral cats." In February 2020, the day before the 32nd anniversary of when Red Dwarf first aired, a plot synopsis was released by the official Red Dwarf website. Al Roberts was also added to the cast in an undisclosed role and Norman Lovett officially announced to be returning as Holly following his "one-off guest spot in Series XII."

On 10 March 2020, in an exclusive with Radio Times, a teaser trailer was released for the special. A rough release date of sometime in April was given, and a day later on 11 March 2020, the official Twitter account for Dave revealed the title of the special: Red Dwarf: The Promised Land. The following week on 17 March 2020, a poster for the special was released, featuring the core cast alongside Fearon's character, and a few days after that a trailer was uploaded to the official YouTube channel for Dave. In promotion of the special, the main cast of Charles, Barrie, John-Jules and Llewellyn, as their respective characters, made the cover of SFX magazine for April 2020, with concept art, stickers and a double-sided poster for the special included in every copy.

== Production ==
Red Dwarf: The Promised Land was filmed at Pinewood Studios in front of a live studio audience.

== Release ==
A nonspecific release date of April was given for the special by Radio Times on 11 March 2020. An official release date of 9 April 2020 was later given as part of the release of the special's official trailer on 20 March 2020.

== Reception ==
Writing for Starburst, Rachel Knightley gave the special a nine out of ten: "Fans won’t be disappointed, but nor are they over catered to. Previous adventures never overshadow the current action; this story takes place in its own time and space, with just a little extra fun by association for those who’ll catch the references, and with new allies and enemies you don’t need any back story to enjoy." James Walton wrote for The Spectator: "The jokes, naturally, came thick and fast, delivered by a cast that by now are utterly tight and completely relaxed at the same time. As ever, too, there was that melancholy underlying awareness of the characters’ loneliness — and an unapologetic yet never solemn engagement with some serious themes, which in this case included the theological." Morgan Jeffery of Radio Times gave it three out of five stars, writing: "The end result is a good-but-not-great first stab at the feature-length format for Red Dwarf – The Promised Land is unlikely to convert anyone who’s found themselves immune to the show’s charms thus far, but it’s a reasonably rewarding outing for the faithful."

The Telegraph's Michael Hogan was critical in his two out of five star review, writing: "The story was stretched so thinly, it almost snapped," concluding, "long-term fans might well have found it a treat. For the rest of us . . . it was more like an endurance exercise than an Easter treat." Similarly, Chris Farnell of Den of Geek was also negative when expressing his thoughts on its plot structure: "the episode as a whole feels like a Frankenstein of half-finished episode ideas smooshed together without much in the way of a unifying theme." Though Rebecca Nicholson, writing for The Guardian, gave a moderate summary in her three out of five star retrospective: "Like that homemade bread you suddenly felt compelled to bake, it’s a bit rough around the edges, not quite the same as shop-bought, but it is a decent enough way to pass the time."
