= The Twits (film) =

2025 film by Phil Johnston

- Release poster
- Directed by: Phil Johnston
- Screenplay by: Phil Johnston; Meg Favreau
- Based on: The Twits by Roald Dahl
- Produced by: Phil Johnston; Maggie Malone; Daisy May West
- Starring: Margo Martindale; Johnny Vegas; Maitreyi Ramakrishnan; Ryan Lopez; Emilia Clarke; Natalie Portman
- Cinematography: Todd Jansen
- Edited by: Erika Dapkewicz
- Music by: Oli Julian (score); David Byrne (songs)
- Production companies: The Roald Dahl Story Company; Netflix Animation Studios; Jellyfish Pictures
- Distributed by: Netflix
- Release date: October 17, 2025
- Running time: 102 minutes
- Countries: United Kingdom; United States
- Language: English

The Twits is a 2025 animated musical fantasy comedy film loosely based on Roald Dahl's 1980 children's novel. The film was produced, directed, and co-written by Phil Johnston. The voice cast includes Margo Martindale and Johnny Vegas as the title characters, alongside Maitreyi Ramakrishnan, Ryan Lopez, Emilia Clarke, and Natalie Portman.

The Twits was released on October 17, 2025, by Netflix. The film received mixed reviews from critics.

== Plot ==
Set in the 2000s, told through the framing device of a firefly named Pippa telling a story to her son, Jeremy, inside Mr. Twit's beard, she presents Mr. and Mrs. Twit, an ugly, spiteful couple who hate everything, especially each other. Their only joy and connection is an amusement park called Twitlandia. However, on its grand opening day, it gets shut down for numerous violations. Vowing revenge, they steal a liquid hot dog meat truck and use it to fill up the water tower, causing an explosion and a flood throughout the town, called Triperot.

The story shifts to two orphans: Beesha, a 12-year-old Indian-American girl, and Bubsy, her friend, who is about to be adopted. Unfortunately, after the Twit's meat flood, Bubsy's potential parents fear he's contaminated and look elsewhere. After giving a pep talk to Bubsy, she realizes the cause of the scandal was the Twits and fulfills Bubsy's other wish of going to Twitlandia. When the two children arrive, they are callously greeted by the Twits, who openly admit their crime.

The children then encounter the Muggle-Wumps, a family of colorful monkey-like creatures from Loompaland, that were locked by the Twits in a double-decker bus-themed cage. The Muggle-Wumps plead to be freed as the Twits torture them to keep the park running. With their power of deep empathy, Beesha and Bubsy understand the Muggle-Wumps. The rescue fails, but Beesha secretly recorded the Twit's confession, so the police arrest the couple. The orphans come back to their house to find a key to free the Muggle-Wumps, and meet a Sweet-Toed Toad who speaks in reverse. The Twits are then bailed out by a family, who want them to help the struggling town, once a capital city for fun, and let them go. Back in the house, Beesha and Bubsy manage to find the key and free the Muggle-Wumps. The Twits chase them to their orphanage.

After taking care of the head of the orphanage, the meek Mr. Napkin, the Twits get into the main bedroom, where the children and creatures are hiding, and manage to prank the Twits to where they fall out of the building. The Twits try to negotiate with Beesha, but she says they can only enter the orphanage if they are the mayor of the town. The orphans and the Muggle-Wumps enjoy themselves until they see the Twits run for the mayoral election at the last minute. They manage to both eliminate their opponent, Mayor Wayne John John-John, by making him eat 'the Triperot Cake', not knowing it was made with laxatives, causing his buttocks to inflate like a balloon that later explodes with a massive fart. They manage to get the townsfolk on their side when Beesha crashes the election. The Twits, now having an outlet for their park, promise that once Twitlandia opens, everybody in Triperot will become billionaires. Marty Muggle-Wump, the patriarch of the Muggle-Wump family, vomits sentient furballs called Florbnorbles from anxiety.

In a heartfelt conversation with Mary Muggle-Wump, the mother, Beesha admits she wants her parents to come back. Mary reassures Beesha is a good girl and that she doesn't have to do things alone. The next morning, the Twits, now co-mayors, start to attack the orphanage with the help of the citizens. The orphans use up a storm of florbnorbles to fight back, scaring everyone away except the Twits. Mr. Napkin, having licked the Opposite-Toed Toad's feet, uncharacteristically fights off the Twits with cheese spray.

Even though Beesha already has a family in the orphanage, she still misses her real parents, who left her there to protect her. So Mr. Twit pretends to be Mr. Napkin and calls to tell her that her parents are in a bowling alley so they can trap her. They use their enraged mob to move the orphanage to Twitlandia and start using them in a dancing park-opening act. Beesha, having escaped, is motivated by the Sweet Toed Toad and decides to save her new family. Twitlandia is reopened, with the citizens ecstatic. Beesha manages to get the Twits to lick the Sweet Toed Toad's feet and uncharacteristically free the Muggle-Wumps. They then admit to lying about saving the town and apologize by blowing up their park.

The orphans and the Muggle-Wumps plan to end the Twits once and for all with a prank. They start changing their living room, while the park goes down in flames. The Twits arrive home and think they're standing on the ceiling, because the whole room was rearranged to look upside down. They stand on their hands to correct themselves, but are stuck to the floor due to the glue the orphans applied to their heads. The orphans party in victory and mock the Twits' fate, saying they will shrink to death due to gravity. Beesha realizes they can no longer understand the Muggle-Wumps anymore due to their unsympathy, so they fix their revenge by freeing the Twits, whom they soon escape from.

In an epilogue, Mr. Napkin returns the orphanage to where it was. The Muggle-Wumps sell their tears to be industrialized and help fund the entire orphanage. The town's reputation as a place for fun is reinstated with the help of the Flobnorbles. Beesha now lives happily with her newfound family. The Twits get caught in a balloon prank gone wrong, allowing Pippa and Jeremy to escape free from Mr Twit's beard and flew to safety. In the mid-credit scene, the Twits end up flying into Loompaland, where they get swallowed by the mouth of a giant Sweet-Toed Toad after encountering the Roly-Poly Bird.

== Voice cast ==
- Margo Martindale as Mrs. Credenza S. Twit
- Johnny Vegas as Mr. James T. Twit
  - Euan Morton as T. Twit's singing voice
- Maitreyi Ramakrishnan as Beesha
- Ryan Lopez as Bubsy
- Emilia Clarke as Pippa
- Natalie Portman as Mary Muggle-Wump
- Timothy Simons as Marty Muggle-Wump
- Jason Mantzoukas as Mayor Wayne John John-John
- Alan Tudyk as Sweet Toed Toad
- Nicole Byer as Beverly Onion
- Mark Proksch as Horvis Dungle
- Rebecca Wisocky as Dee Dumdie-Dungle
- Charlie Berens as Gorb Klurb
- Phil Johnston as Mr. Napkin

== Production ==
=== Development ===
In February 2003, a feature film adaptation of the book entered development at Vanguard Animation with its founder John H. Williams set to produce. As part of a multi-picture deal with Walt Disney Pictures, Vanguard was set to produce a live-action animated film, with John Cleese and Kirk DeMicco writing the screenplay. In November 2004, it was reported that Mark Mylod would direct the feature, and that Cleese may star in the film. In October 2006, after the executive/regime changes at Disney, the project moved to Working Title Films and Universal Pictures. By January 2012, Vanguard's official website stated that Conrad Vernon would direct the film.

In April 2022, following Netflix's acquisition of the Roald Dahl Story Company, it was reported that a feature film would be released on their service, after having previously announced an animated series based on the book. In September 2023, alongside the release of a first-look image of the film, it was announced that Phil Johnston was directing the feature and co-writing the screenplay with Meg Favreau.

=== Casting ===
In June 2024, it was revealed that Natalie Portman, Emilia Clarke, Margo Martindale and Johnny Vegas had joined the cast. In August 2025, Maitreyi Ramakrishnan, Timothy Simons, and the rest of the additional cast were revealed.

=== Animation ===
Animation had begun by September 2023, the same month it was reported that the London-based visual effects and animation studio Jellyfish Pictures with their facilities in Toronto and Mumbai was providing animation services on the film. This marks the last film Jellyfish Pictures was involved with, as the company was shut down 7 months before the release of the film.

=== Music ===
In August 2025, it was announced that in addition to Oli Julian composing the film's score, David Byrne would write three original songs for the film: "We're Not Like Ev'ryone Else", "Lullaby" and "The Problem Is You". He also wrote the film's closing credits song, "Open The Door", with Hayley Williams. The original soundtrack for was released digitally on October 17, 2025, by Netflix Music.

== Release ==
The Twits was released on October 17, 2025, on Netflix.

== Reception ==
On the review aggregator website Rotten Tomatoes, 50% of 24 critics' reviews are positive, with an average rating of 5.3/10. Metacritic, which uses a weighted average, assigned the film a score of 48 out of 100, based on 9 critics, indicating "mixed or average" reviews.

Brian Tallerico of RogerEbert.com wrote "Johnston uses the foundation of Dahl's 1980 tale of a couple of idiots who play pranks on each other to stay entertained—a story that Dahl reportedly wrote because he hated beards, of all things—and built it out into his own universe [...] Some of it feels rushed and repetitive, but there's a reasonable amount of ambition to admire here, especially compared to other streaming original films for the family." Gregory Nussen of Screen Rant wrote "In the end, it briefly seems like Johnston and screenwriter Meg Favreau are going for a hope-core ending where empathy defeats all, but The Twits is ultimately much smarter than that. "Hate is easy," Mary warns Beesha. If those that oppose you won't change their ways, then the real challenge to idealism is not letting them change you in turn. That, and sometimes a good fart joke can be the peak of comedy."

Cath Clarke of The Guardian wrote, "Any of Dahl's gruesome sense of fun is obliterated by a bulldozing message of empathy and kindness...This is vile and revolting in all the wrong ways." Peter Debruge of Variety wrote "If the Twits stand for something, it's hatred of everything, and in this telling, it takes standing on their heads to realize that's no way to succeed in the world." Luna Guthrie of Collider wrote "This long-awaited adaptation of The Twits loses its character too much in modernity, but it is probably about as good as we could hope for, given how much the world has changed since Dahl wrote it 45 years ago. It's funny, it's zany, it looks good and has some really great character work going for it, but it probably would have turned out better as a product of the 20th century."

Richard Lawson of The Hollywood Reporter wrote "It's funny that a film that initially seems destined to be a minor, forgettable toss-off can suddenly distinguish itself, to the point that most of its flaws are either waved away or embraced." Robbie Collin of The Daily Telegraph wrote "If you don't actually want to make a film out of a Roald Dahl book, this critic's advice is: don't." William Bibbiani of TheWrap wrote "I've read all of Roald Dahl's books. I admire their jerkiness, even if I don't think highly of the jerk who wrote them. "The Twits" was never Dahl's best work, but at least it was short. "The Twits" is one of the worst Dahl adaptations, and I wish it was shorter."

=== Accolades ===
Award / Festival	Date of ceremony	Category	Recipient(s)	Result	Ref.
Annie Awards	February 21, 2026	Best Character Design – Feature	Kei Acedera, Tristan Poulain, Jules Rigolle, Fernando Peque, Remi Salmon	Nominated	
Annie Awards	February 21, 2026	Best Production Design – Feature	Estefania Pantoja, Alexandre Diboine, Clement Dartigues, Fernando Peque, Remi Salmon	Nominated	
Annie Awards	February 21, 2026	Best Voice Acting – Feature	Maitreyi Ramakrishnan	Nominated	
