= Norman Lovett =

British actor and comedian (born 1946)

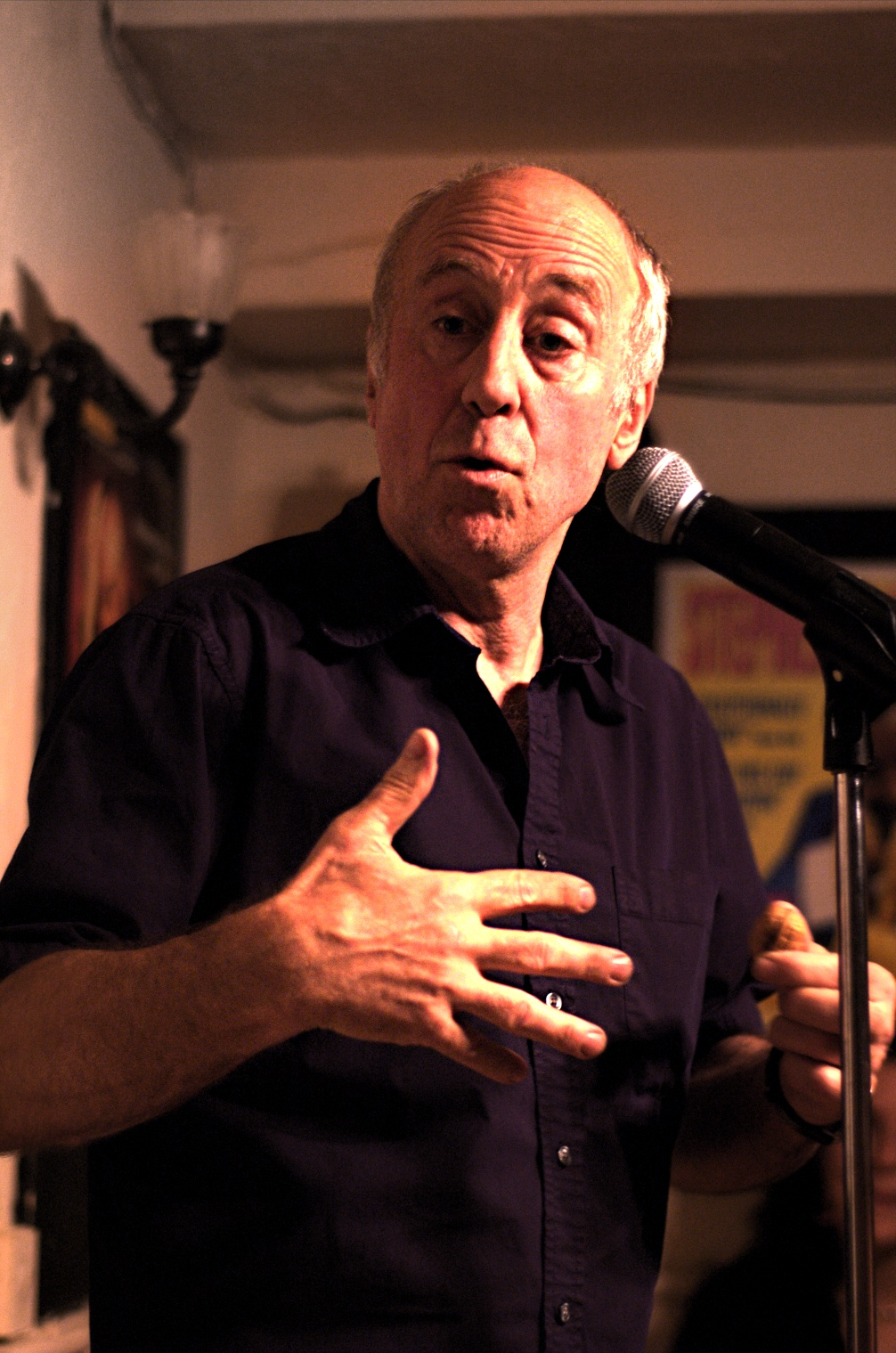
- Norman Lovett in 2005
- Born: 31 October 1946 (age 79); Windsor, Berkshire, England

Comedy career
- Years active: 1976–present
- Medium: Stand-up comedy, actor, film, television
- Website: normanlovett.com

Norman Lovett (born 31 October 1946) is a British stand-up comedian and actor best known for his portrayal of Holly, the ship's computer in Red Dwarf.

== Early life ==
Norman Lovett was born in Windsor, Berkshire, and moved at the age of two months with his family to Clacton-on-Sea, Essex, where he lived until his mid twenties when he moved to London.

== Career ==
Lovett became a stand-up comedian in his thirties, initially supporting punk bands in the late 1970s, before establishing himself on the alternative comedy scene during the 1980s. He played London's Comedy Store on many occasions.

From 1989 to 1993, Lovett wrote and starred in his own surreal BBC2 sitcom called I, Lovett. He played a version of himself who is an inventor living in a world of surrealism with his talking dog, voiced by Geoffrey Hughes; spider, voiced by Mary Riggans; and talking inanimate objects. During this time, he also wrote and starred in a one-off special called Lovett Goes To Town, which was aired as part of Galaxy series The Last Laugh.

In 1996, Lovett played a doctor in the short-lived sitcom Asylum, created by Edgar Wright, alongside Simon Pegg, Jessica Stevenson, Julian Barratt and an ensemble cast. Lovett later worked with Edgar Wright again on Is It Bill Bailey?, a stand-up/sketch series starring Bill Bailey.

Lovett's first television appearances include a stand-up performance on Pyjamarama in 1983, and a brief role in The Young Ones in the episode Summer Holiday. He appeared again with The Young Ones star Rik Mayall in sketches for UK music series The Tube, and television act The Dangerous Brothers.

Lovett has made a number of other acting appearances such as the Ghost of Christmas Past in a television adaptation of A Christmas Carol, Mr. Follett in The History of Tom Jones, the film The Criminal, BBC docudrama Seven Wonders of the Industrial World, as well as the BBC One sitcom Keeping Up Appearances. He also appeared in three episodes of drama The Bill, three episodes of the Scottish sitcom Rab C Nesbitt, an episode of EastEnders, comedy drama series Happy Families, and children's television series Gordon the Gopher. He played a supporting role in two series of the television series Don't Miss Wax, hosted by Ruby Wax.

In 2006, Lovett appeared in the comedy-horror film Evil Aliens. In 2013, he featured in the mockumentary feature film Behind the Scenes of Total Hell.

Lovett's comedy has a quiet, dead-pan surrealism, and in 2000, he made a successful stand-up tour, co-headlining with Chris Barrie, who played Rimmer in Red Dwarf. In 2008 Lovett co-headlined a stand-up tour with Hattie Hayridge, who played the female version of Holly in Red Dwarf. His career as a stand-up comedian has included regular appearances at the Edinburgh Fringe. Comedian Stewart Lee has cited Lovett as an influence, and on occasion the two have featured on the same bill, including an alternative comedy showcase event in 2011, curated by Lee at the Royal Festival Hall. In 2008, Lovett released his first stand-up DVD Bags and Biscuits. In 2012, he released his second stand-up DVD, Norman Lovett: Outside the Box.

From 2014 to 2018, Lovett was a main cast member in BBC Radio 4 comedy To Hull and Back, alongside Maureen Lipman and series creator Lucy Beaumont.

== Red Dwarf ==
Lovett played the role of Holly in Red Dwarf in its first and second series. Starting from the third series, Lovett declined to join the cast when Red Dwarf filming moved to London, while Lovett had moved to Edinburgh, with the distance between the two cities decreasing his willingness to participate.

Lovett returned in the seventh series as a guest star and the eighth as a regular. However, a disagreement with writer/producer Doug Naylor meant that for a period Lovett refused to take part in any further Red Dwarf productions.

Following the success of Red Dwarf X, Lovett resumed contact with Naylor, resulting in his guest appearance in the twelfth series episode "Skipper". After this, Lovett resumed his role as Holly in the 2020 special The Promised Land.

Lovett has also played the role of Holly in Red Dwarf-related releases, such as the "Tongue Tied" music video, a sketch for BBC's Children in Need, the interactive DVD game Beat the Geek, and additional footage filmed for Red Dwarf Remastered.

== Other activities ==
Lovett is known for political activism. He has performed stand-up comedy on numerous occasions for 'Stand Up For Labour' in support of said party. In 2016, he was awarded Stand Up For Labour's Act of the Year. In September 2016, Lovett performed at the 'Keep Corbyn' rally in Brighton, in support of Jeremy Corbyn's campaign in the Labour Party leadership election.

Lovett's voice is available as an in-game purchase in the 2014 game Elite Dangerous, allowing the user to customise the ships 'COVAS' speech system.

Lovett has stated that one of his personal career highlights was supporting punk rock band The Clash.
