= Siliconia =

- Red Dwarf episode
- Episode no.: Series 12; Episode 2
- Directed by: Doug Naylor
- Written by: Doug Naylor
- Original air date: 19 October 2017

Guest appearances
- Richard Glover as Wind; Laura Checkley as Areto; James Buckley as Rusty; Marcus Garvey as Chairbot Excalibur; Naomi Sheldon as Eagle; Nick Read as Incense

Episode chronology
← Previous "Cured"	Next → "Timewave"
- Red Dwarf XII

"Siliconia" is the second episode of Red Dwarf XII and the 69th in the series run. Originally broadcast on the British television channel Dave on 19 October 2017, it was made available early on 12 October 2017 on UKTV Play.

The crew are kidnapped by a militant group of mechanoid insurgents known as the MILF (Mechanoid Intergalactic Liberation Front), "liberating" Kryten from his servitude, and converting Lister, Rimmer, and Cat into mechanoids themselves.

== Synopsis ==
The day starts as any other onboard Red Dwarf with Kryten (Robert Llewellyn) receiving a multitude of orders from the other three. Later on, Kryten discovers they've located a guitar belonging to Lister (Craig Charles), previously flushed out into deep space. The crew, though with a very reluctant Rimmer (Chris Barrie) and Cat (Danny John-Jules) included, take Starbug over to retrieve it. Once they do, they're taken in by a far larger and greatly intimidating vessel, who get the drop on the crew when they enter; the black beret-adorned mechanoids only take Lister, Rimmer, and Cat as prisoners, however, as they warmly take in Kryten as one of their own.

The other three are placed into devices against their will, which one-by-one, transfers their essences into mechanoids resembling themselves. They are informed by the MILF, Areto (Laura Checkley), that they'll serve as their slaves as Kryten once was to them, and any possibility of refusal will prove impossible. Meanwhile, Kryten is pampered by the other mechanoids, and attends group therapy sessions where he is convinced of his former slave status to the Red Dwarf crew. As the three Kryten-ified others do menial labour for their new masters, they devise an escape plan which Rimmer foils by triggering an alarm, having had his personality completely erased by his new mechanoid programming.

Lister and Cat rush into the lower decks of the ship where they meet another group of mechanoids, but these being seen as second-class citizens to the members of the MILF due to being earlier models. Just as they're ambushed by Areto and her reinforcements, Cat becomes fully-converted as well, and Lister flees. Kryten is in the midst of his inauguration into the MILF, when Lister bursts in and pleads against it. In an impassioned speech, Lister proclaims Kryten was never a slave to the Red Dwarf crew, and he was always one of them; Areto and her reinforcements arrive, as Lister also reveals they enslave their own due to them being comparatively outdated, to which the MILF leader defends as necessary. Kryten realises his mistake and refuses to join, to which the militants respond by putting him and Lister in a battle to the death, where the loser will be jettisoned into deep space. Lister loses his personality prior to the match, and Kryten loses, not putting up a fight. Before Kryten is thrown off the ship by the now fully-brainwashed Red Dwarf crew, the fabled "Siliconia" (in actuality a DivaDroid wireless update station) comes into the ship's path and upgrades all the mechanoids, making them all equal. Kryten declines the update and deconverts the other three using the same machine, leading them back onboard Starbug and back to Red Dwarf.

== Production ==
The episode was originally titled Kryticus, referencing Spartacus, or more specifically the film of the same name, due to it sharing the theme of rebelling against enslavement. Despite advances in the construction of the Kryten mask for Robert Llewellyn, the rest of the cast had to have their mechanoid masks constructed in the same physical-procedure as earlier series.

Siliconia was also the first episode revealed of XI and XII, as it was mentioned at the initial announcement of both series at the Dimension Jump convention in 2015; saying how after years of being asked by the cast to do an episode where "everyone is Kryten" he'd agree to do one in the upcoming series.

== Reception ==
"Siliconia" was met with positive reviews from critics and fans. With praise going toward the new mechanoid prosthetics of the three cast regulars, as well as the elements of pathos during the loss of their individual personalities.
