= The Tree (2010 film) =

- Film Poster
- Directed by: Julie Bertuccelli
- Written by: Julie Bertuccelli
- Screenplay by: Elizabeth J. Mars
- Based on: Our Father Who Art in the Tree by Judy Pascoe
- Produced by: Sue Taylor; Yaël Fogiel; Laetitia Gonzalez
- Starring: Charlotte Gainsbourg; Marton Csokas; Morgan Davies (Note: Credited as Morgana Davies); Christian Byers; Tom Russell; Gabriel Gotting; Aden Young
- Cinematography: Nigel Bluck
- Edited by: François Gédigier
- Music by: Grégoire Hetzel
- Production companies: Taylor Media; Les Films du Poisson
- Distributed by: Transmission Films (through Paramount Pictures; Australia); Le Pacte (France)
- Release dates: 23 May 2010 (Cannes); 11 August 2010 (France); 30 September 2010 (Australia)
- Running time: 100 minutes
- Countries: Australia; France
- Language: English
- Budget: $10 million
- Box office: $2,219,182

The Tree is a French-Australian 2010 film co-produced between Australia and France. It was filmed in the small town of Boonah in Queensland, Australia, and follows the lives of Dawn (Charlotte Gainsbourg) and her four children after the unexpected death of her husband Peter (Aden Young). The film is an adaptation of the 2002 debut novel Our Father Who Art in the Tree by Australian writer and performer Judy Pascoe. The film closed the Cannes Film Festival on 23 May 2010 following the Awards Ceremony and received a seven-minute standing ovation. In addition, The Tree premiered at the 2010 Sydney Film Festival. The film is distributed in the US by Zeitgeist Films, opening on 15 July 2011 in New York, on 22 July in Los Angeles, Boston and Washington, D.C., and throughout the country over the summer.

== Plot ==
Dawn and Peter O'Neil live together with their children (three boys and a girl), on the outskirts of a small country town. Next to their rambling house stands the kids' favourite playground: a giant Moreton Bay fig tree (now known in real-life as the Teviotville Tree), whose branches reach high towards the sky and roots stretch far into the ground.

Everything seems perfect until Peter suffers a heart attack, crashing his car into the tree's trunk. Dawn is devastated, left alone with her grief and four children to raise. Until one day, 8-year-old Simone, reveals a secret to her mother. She's convinced her father whispers to her through the leaves of the tree and he's come back to protect them. Dawn takes comfort from Simone's imagination, and starts to believe in it herself; just like Simone, Dawn also likes to spend time in the tree. It starts to dominate their physical and emotional landscape. But the close bond between mother and Simone forged through a mutual sorrow and shared secret, is threatened by the arrival of George, the plumber, called in to remove the tree's troublesome roots. As the relationship between Dawn and George blossoms, the tree continues to grow, with its branches infiltrating the house, its roots destroying the foundations. Dawn decides the tree has to go. George and some other workmen arrive, but Simone climbs in the tree to defend it. Dawn and George try to convince her, but she refuses to come down. George argues to Dawn that the girl is only 8 years old, Dawn should not allow her to stop the necessary removal of the tree. This irritates Dawn, and she cancels the operation, and tells George she does not want to see him again.

In a big storm the house is demolished by the tree, and the family leaves the area, planning to start living somewhere else, perhaps in a tent.

== Cast ==
- Charlotte Gainsbourg as Dawn
- Marton Csokas as George
- Aden Young as Peter
- Morgan Davies as Simone
- Christian Byers as Tim
- Tom Russell as Lou
- Gabriel Gotting as Charlie
- Gillian Jones as Vonnie
- Penne Hackforth-Jones as Mrs. Johnson
- Benita Collings as Aunt Mary
- Wendy Playfair as Aunt Harriet

== Production ==
The Tree was written and directed by Julie Bertuccelli, it is based on the screenplay by Elizabeth J. Mars, produced by Sue Taylor of Taylor Media, Yael Fogiel and Laetitia Gonzalez of Les Films du Poisson, and is a co-production between Australia and France. It came to be a co-production when Julie Bertuccelli was given the book Our Father Who Art in the Tree by a close friend. When she looked into getting the rights for the film she found that Australian producer Sue Taylor already had them, however she did not have a director. It just so happened that Julie is a director, and from there the co-production was born. The tree used in the film is Teviotville Tree, located in the small town of Teviotville in the state of Queensland. It has a 34 m spread, 20 m height and 2.31 m diameter at 1 m above ground, which is the narrowest point. The tree has low branches which have not been pruned off, and when they are laden with fruit they reach the ground. It is very rare to find this in a Moreton Bay fig tree. It is estimated that it was planted in 1880.

== Reception ==
On review aggregator website Rotten Tomatoes, the film has an approval rating of 72% based on 67 critics, with an average rating of 6.2/10. The site's consensus reads: "Though it leans rather heavily on its central metaphor, The Tree is a moving and ultimately hopeful meditation on grief with shades of magical realism". On Metacritic, The Tree holds 58 out of a 100 based on 20 critics, indicating "mixed or average reviews".

Marjorie Baumgarten of The Austin Chronicle wrote "Pacing problems and shallow psychological inquiries plague this film almost as much as the overworked metaphor that supplies the film's title.".

Sheri Linden of the Los Angeles Times praised Bertuccelli's directing for its use of "the scrubbed topography of Queensland, Australia", adding that "her mystical symbols can be as on-the-nose as her dialogue". A similar praise also came from Patrick Peters of Empire who called the film "An eerie and unsettling adaptation of Judy Pascoe's novel that impresses more for its atmospherics than its narrative".

Critics such as Michael O'Sullivan of The Washington Post called The Tree "not exactly subtle", while Mick LaSalle of the San Francisco Chronicle said that "It's simply vagueness".

According to Peter Bradshaw of The Guardian "The imagery is almost unendurably self-conscious, and Gainsbourg, with her low, musical, murmuring voice, gives the kind of performance you suspect she can do standing on her head. Her final lines are irritating beyond belief".

== Soundtrack ==
Original film music was written and composed by Grégoire Hetzel. The soundtrack features other songs of the film:

1. "Weak" – Asaf Avidan & The Mojos (3:34)
2. "Wake" – Grégoire Hetzel (2:58)
3. "The Tree" – Main Theme – Grégoire Hetzel (3:55)
4. Chorus of "Die Kriegsknechte aber" from "The Passion according to St. John" – Scholars Baroque Ensemble (1:26)
5. "Flying Foxes" – The Slippers (2:47)
6. "Speak to Me" – Grégoire Hetzel (2:55)
7. "Simone's Theme" – Grégoire Hetzel (3:18)
8. "The Roots" – Grégoire Hetzel (3:27)
9. "Shiver Shiver" – The Slippers (3:48)
10. "Under the Branches" – Grégoire Hetzel (3:55)
11. "Wounded Tree" – Grégoire Hetzel (3:13)
12. "To Build a Home" – The Cinematic Orchestra (6:12)
13. "Daydream" (Extra Track) – Grégoire Hetzel (8:45)
