= Les Films du Poisson =

French film production company

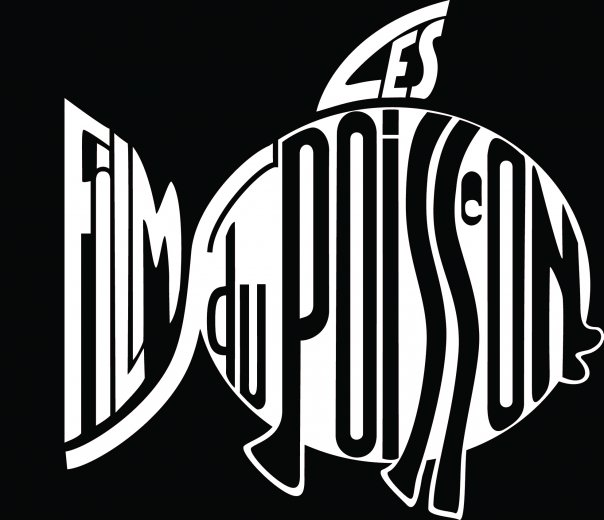
- Company type: Private
- Industry: Film
- Founded: 1995
- Headquarters: Paris, France
- Website: filmsdupoisson.com

Les Films du Poisson is a French film production company founded in 1995 by Yael Fogiel and Laetitia Gonzalez. The company has produced more than a hundred films: features, documentaries and shorts. Many have won awards in France and around the world. In 2011 France's Academy of Film names Les Films du Poisson Best Producers.

== Selected filmography ==
=== 2026 ===
- La Gradiva directed by Marine Atlan

=== 2023 ===
- Orlando, My Political Biography directed by Paul B. Preciado
- Little Girl Blue directed by Mona Achache

=== 2019 ===
- The Room, directed by Christian Volckman

=== 2014 ===
- The Dune, directed by Yossi Aviram

=== 2013 ===
- Friends From France, directed by Anne Weil and Philippe Kotlarski

=== 2012 ===
- The Gatekeepers, directed by Dror Moreh
- Beautiful Valley, directed by Hadar Friedlich
- Land of Oblivion, directed by Emmanuel Finkiel

=== 2011 ===
- Land of Oblivion, directed by Michale Boganim
- Diary, Letters, Revolutions..., directed by Flavia Castro

=== 2010 ===
- The Tree, directed by Julie Bertuccelli, with Charlotte Gainsbourg, 2010 Cannes Film Festival: official selection, out of competition
- On Tour, directed by Mathieu Amalric, Best Director Award (Cannes Film Festival), FIPRESCI Award
- Lignes de Front, directed by Jean-Christophe Klotz

=== 2009 ===
- La Grande vie, by Emmanuel Salinger

=== 2007 ===
- Jellyfish, by Etgar Keret, Camera d'Or prize at the 2007 Cannes Film Festival

=== 2003 ===
- Since Otar Left, by Julie Bertuccelli, Critics Week Grand Prize at the 2003 Cannes Film Festival

=== 2000 ===
- Voyages, by Emmanuel Finkiel, César Award for Best Debut
