= M-Corp (Red Dwarf) =

- Red Dwarf episode
- Episode no.: Series 12; Episode 5
- Directed by: Doug Naylor
- Written by: Doug Naylor
- Original air date: 9 November 2017

Guest appearances
- Helen George as Aniter; Ian Boldsworth as Steve; Oliver Maltman as Chippy; Phil Adele as Jim

Episode chronology
← Previous "Mechocracy"	Next → "Skipper"
- Red Dwarf XII

"M-Corp" is the fifth episode of Red Dwarf XII and the 72nd in the series run. Originally broadcast on the British television channel Dave on 9 November 2017, it was made available early on 2 November 2017 on UKTV Play.

After Red Dwarf receives a long-overdue software update, the crew learn their employer has been purchased in a takeover by M-Corp, the universe's largest multi-national conglomerate.

== Synopsis ==
On his 50th birthday, Lister (Craig Charles) has what appears to be a heart attack, but come further analysis by Kryten (Robert Llewellyn), appears to have been a severe case of indigestion. Just to be safe, Kryten uploads a health-monitoring chip, Chippy, into his bloodstream. However, Chippy ends up exploding and Kryten launches an investigation into the matter. Some time later, Kryten finds Chippy had died due to running on old software, and that Red Dwarf was in dire need of a system update halted due to Cat (Danny John-Jules) unplugging it to make way for his personal items.

After installing the update, the crew are greeted by M-Corp, who reveal they've bought-out the JMC, the former owners of Red Dwarf, in a corporate takeover. Immediately afterward, new equipment branded by M-Corp materializes on board the ship, but Lister, for whatever reason, can only see the M-Corp equipment and not non-M-Corp-related products, such as his Leopard Lager. After some tests, Kryten concludes that the new M-Corp update is blocking Lister's perception of reality, making non-M-Corp products and people disappear, including Kryten, Rimmer (Chris Barrie) and Cat, as one by one, they all become mute and invisible to Lister.

Lister is now essentially alone on board the ship, with many of his personal items invisible to him, such as his beloved guitar, his shaving razor and the couch that he sleeps on. Suddenly, M-Corp materialize a portal in the sleeping quarters, which transports Lister to a new, M-Corp simulation where he must trade a limited currency allocated to his account for menial items, such as drinking water. His currency quickly gets depleted thanks to astronomical prices and the M-Corp software begins manipulating reality to force him into making emergency purchases such as painkillers and fire extinguishers, and charging him in time from his lifespan, quickly aging him. Meanwhile, the rest of the crew decide to uninstall the new M-Corp update from the ship after initiating a master reboot, and enter the teleporter into the M-Corp simulation. After tricking the software into corrupting itself, the crew retrieve Lister, now de-aged thanks to the M-Corp installation, and return to Red Dwarf. Lister, however, is still unable to see non-M-Corp products, including the crew, so Kryten decides to essentially reboot Lister's memory to fix the issue, using his 23-year-old memory as saved to the Hologram Projection Suite and rebuilding the rest of his memory via CCTV footage. The episode ends with Lister annoying Rimmer, in a fashion referencing the very first scene of the first episode.

== Production ==
The final scene referencing the beginning of "The End" wasn't able to be filmed on the night of the recording in front of the live studio audience; however, Doug Naylor and the crew still wanted the audience members to experience it and so staged it anyway. The audience laughter was taken from that performance and edited into the later version.

== Reception ==
"M-Corp" received positive reviews from critics, and was received warmly by fans.
