= Timewave (Red Dwarf) =

- Red Dwarf episode
- Episode no.: Series 12; Episode 3
- Directed by: Doug Naylor
- Written by: Doug Naylor
- Original air date: 26 October 2017

Guest appearances
- Johnny Vegas as Crit Cop; Jamie Chapman as Ziggy; Paul Leonard as Guru; Amrita Acharia as Waitress Greta; Joe Sims as Tutt Johnson

Episode chronology
← Previous "Siliconia"	Next → "Mechocracy"
- Red Dwarf XII

"Timewave" is the third episode of Red Dwarf XII and the 70th in the series run. Originally broadcast on the British television channel Dave on 26 October 2017, it was made available early on 19 October 2017 on UKTV Play.

After experiencing a strange time phenomenon, the crew must venture on board a starship from the 24th century to stop them from crashing into an oncoming gas moon, only to be hindered by its unorthodox anti-criticism law.

== Synopsis ==
After the crew claim a moon rich in Helium-7 for the JMC (an exercise orchestrated mainly by Rimmer (Chris Barrie)), they are forced to leave sooner than anticipated because an incoming solar storm is detected. On the way back to Red Dwarf onboard Starbug, the crew experience a timewave, which Kryten explains is the aftereffect of an imploding black hole, and that whoever falls victim to one risks the chance of being washed-up into an inhabitable corner of deep space. They discover another ship has been swept by the timewave, which is on a direct collision-course with the moon. They decide to board it to stop the collision, though their research tells them that the ship, which is from 24th-century Earth, has laws which prohibit criticism, so requiring the Red Dwarf crew to moderate their behaviour.

Greeted by the ship's flamboyant captain, Ziggy (Jamie Chapman), they learn that the ship's crew are largely assigned to tasks outside their areas of expertise, which they are performing poorly but not being criticised for or removed from; this explains why the ship is on a collision course. They are then guided to the ship's diner, and it becomes apparent the ship is in total disarray. After a bad experience with a waitress, they criticise her and agree that the ship is a lost cause. However, on their way back to Starbug, they are stopped by a ship's policemen, who question whether they are following the anti-criticism laws of their society. Cat (Danny John-Jules) grows fed up and insults the lead officer (Johnny Vegas), resulting in their imprisonment on the ship's brig.

After a nearly-successful attempt at escape by the Red Dwarf crew, they sway the head policeman against the anti-criticism law, but Ziggy returns and orders that they be "drained" of their critical behavior. They are all hooked-up to an anti-criticism device, and Rimmer is chosen to be the first one "drained". However, his critical side proves too strong for the extractor, and manifests into a being of its own, who, after some reasoning by the crew, is defeated. After this fiasco, Ziggy concludes that the crew's defeating of Rimmer's critical side through criticism proves the ship's anti-criticism law incorrect. Ziggy wises up and reassigns his staff to their own roles, and the ship is guided away from the collision course with the moon. Ziggy then offers an apology to the Red Dwarf crew, and a reward. He suggests his gift could have been a mechanoid upgrade, or a faster-than-light drive upgrade for the Red Dwarf, but he determines that the best thing he has to offer is one of his pre-school style drawings. Lister (Craig Charles), believing Ziggy is now open to criticism, says the drawing isn't very good, with the consequence that Ziggy, enraged, reinstates the anti-criticism law, and so the Red Dwarf crew have to flee the ship.

== Reception ==
"Timewave" received negative reviews from critics and fans. Complaints cited the episode's poor structure and jarring jokes.
