= White Hole (Red Dwarf) =

- Red Dwarf episode
- Episode no.: Series 4 Episode 4
- Directed by: Ed Bye; Paul Jackson
- Written by: Rob Grant; Doug Naylor
- Original air date: 7 March 1991

Guest appearance
- David Ross as Talkie Toaster

Episode chronology
← Previous "Justice"	Next → "Dimension Jump"
- Red Dwarf IV

"White Hole" is the fourth episode of science fiction sitcom Red Dwarf Series IV and the twenty-second episode in the series run.

It was first broadcast on the British television channel BBC2 on 7 March 1991 and was written by Rob Grant and Doug Naylor, and directed by Ed Bye and Paul Jackson.

The episode features the crew's attempt to escape the influence of a white hole.

== Plot ==
Dave Lister (Craig Charles) is disgusted when he finds that Kryten (Robert Llewellyn) has repaired Talkie Toaster (David Ross) – an automated toaster whose AI became obsessed with toasting anything bread-related and unwilling to accept refusal of his products, leading to him being smashed up as a result. Kryten explains that he rebuilt the toaster as a guinea-pig in an experimental procedure called intelligence compression, which would restore an AI's former IQ at the cost of a reduced operational lifespan, hoping to use the same procedure to cure Holly (Hattie Hayridge) of computer senility. However, when the procedure is undertaken, Holly discovers that due to a miscalculation her IQ is now more than double her original score but that she has a life expectancy of three minutes. As a result, the ship's computer shuts herself down to preserve life, putting Red Dwarf onto back-up power as a result. Without power, Lister, Kryten, Arnold Rimmer (Chris Barrie) and Cat (Danny John-Jules) are forced to operate on basic methods, including journeys of five days to and from the cargo decks and having to resort to pedal-powered electricity generation to operate even basic appliances.

As Kryten and Rimmer make a return trip from the cargo decks, the pair encounter a space-time phenomenon that prompts them to bring the others together to examine it. Struggling with the phenomenon's effect upon the ship, Kryten manages to reveal to the others that Red Dwarf has come within range of a white hole – a very rare spatial phenomenon that spews time into the universe, much as a black hole sucks matter from it. The group opt to ask Holly for help and activate her long enough to be given a solution – to use a thermonuclear device on a star to catapult a planet from its orbit and into the mouth of the white hole. Lister opts to handle the aiming of the device, citing his experiences playing pool, rather than accept Holly's calculations; with Rimmer wanting to follow Holly's calculations, Kryten and Cat vote for Lister due to their programming and general dislike of Rimmer, respectively. Lister manages to execute the plan, having taken the opportunity to pull off a trick shot. The crew are soon surprised to hear Holly asking when her IQ is to be restored. Kryten points out that time is being reverted to the point before they encountered the white hole, thus they will forget what happened, and so he takes the opportunity to give an honest opinion about Rimmer.

== Production ==
This was the last script written for Series IV and originally included a story line revolving around Garbage World, which first appeared in the second novel Better Than Life. With the plot featuring giant cockroaches and huge garbage world sets, it was considered too expensive to shoot. A new script was quickly written, taking another idea from that same novel, only the black hole was now changed to a white hole.

Although Ed Bye is credited as having directed this episode he was actually unavailable on the day of the studio record. The show's former producer, Paul Jackson, stepped in to cover the direction duties with a Christmas party hangover. Danny John-Jules, infamous for being late, thought it was a joke by crewmembers when he was told that Paul Jackson was directing, since Paul was known for his short temper and insistence on being punctual. He still turned up late, and as expected, enraged Jackson. According to Chris Barrie, Paul Jackson's presence alone caused the crew to suddenly double in size. Robert Llewellyn even commented on a soundman walking precariously along the gantry above the set, "risking life and limb," and various other crewmembers removing nails with their teeth and Naylor remarked that some carpenters were hammering in other nails with their heads, humorous references to the fear that Jackson struck into the hearts of the crew.

The new super intelligent Holly was visioned as having a bald head and small spectacles. This was changed to just having her hair smoothed back.

To film the new look Holly Hattie Hayridge was filmed in front of bluescreen wearing a blue polo-neck. This allowed her disembodied head to be superimposed to the episode footage.

David Ross, the actor who originally played Kryten, returned to the show as the voice of Talkie Toaster. He found it a much simpler task than when he had previously endured the Kryten make-up. To play the Toaster required no rehearsals; he simply stood in front of a microphone and read the lines.

== Cultural references ==
Rimmer references Napoleon as the historical figure that he'd like to go back and work with. He also cites Captain Oates and Scott's diary when defending his cowardice to relinquish his life.

== Reception ==
"White Hole" was originally broadcast on the British television channel BBC2 on 7 March 1991.

The episode was generally considered one of the best from Series IV – just behind the series' favourite "Dimension Jump."

Sophie Davies writing in 2017 for CultBox said that the episode "is enjoyable enough but feels like it has too many ideas fighting for room."

== See also ==
- Better Than Life – the second Red Dwarf novel which features the influence for the episode "White Hole".
- Novikov self-consistency principle
