= The Twits =

1980 children's novel by Roald Dahl

- Second edition
- Author: Roald Dahl
- Illustrator: Quentin Blake
- Cover artist: Quentin Blake
- Language: English
- Genre: Children's novel
- Publisher: Jonathan Cape (United Kingdom)
- Publication date: 1980
- Publication place: United Kingdom
- Media type: Print (hardback, paperback)
- Pages: 87

The Twits is a 1980 children's novel by British author Roald Dahl. It was first published by publishing house Jonathan Cape. The story features The Twits (Mr. and Mrs. Twit), a spiteful, lazy, and unkempt couple who continuously play nasty tricks on each other to amuse themselves and exercise their devious wickedness on their pet monkeys.

Dahl's disgust at beards was the inspiration for Mr. Twit. As Dahl stated, he penned The Twits in an effort to "do something against beards". Dahl's biographer, fellow children's author Michael Rosen, recalls the first time the pair met. Dahl leaned across to Rosen's son, Joe, and said of his father's beard: "It's probably got this morning's breakfast in it. And last night's dinner. And old bits of rubbish, any old stuff that he's come across. You might even find a bicycle wheel in it".

In 2003, The Twits was listed at number 81 in The Big Read, a BBC survey of the British public of the top 200 novels of all time. Nine years later, the titular Twits appeared on a Royal Mail commemorative postage stamp. In 2023, the novel was ranked by BBC at no. 87 in their poll of "The 100 greatest children's books of all time". The Twits was adapted for the stage in 2007 and an animated film adaptation, directed by Phil Johnston, was released on 17 October 2025 on Netflix.

Penguin Books has released the book in audiobook form thrice: in 2001 read by Simon Callow, in 2013 read by Richard Ayoade, and in 2024 read by Sara Pascoe.

== Plot ==
An unpleasant married couple known as the Twits live together in a house without windows. Mr. and Mrs. Twit dislike one another and play pranks on each other, such as hiding worms in their spaghetti or putting a live frog in their bed. The Twits, who are retired circus monkey trainers, also keep a former family of pet monkeys, the Muggle-Wumps, and Mr. Twit is trying to create the first upside-down monkey circus; consequently, the monkeys spend every waking hour standing on their heads.

Mr. Twit uses glue called "Hugtight" to catch birds in a tree every Tuesday so that Mrs. Twit can make bird pie on Wednesdays. One Tuesday night, a group of four boys see the ladder next to this tree and they decided to climb up, not thinking or knowing that glue was on the tree. The following morning, Mr. Twit sees that the boys have scared the birds away. Out of rage, he charges at the boys, but they escape by taking their trousers off. The monkeys try to warn the birds before they land on the tree, but the English-speaking birds do not understand the monkeys' African language. One day, the Roly-Poly bird flies to visit the monkeys, and they tell him to secretly save the birds by acting as an interpreter. After Mr. Twit tries and fails several times to catch the birds, he and Mrs. Twit angrily decide to go shopping for guns.

With their owners gone, the Muggle-Wumps come up with an idea to use Hugtight to attach the Twits' furniture to their ceiling with help from the birds. The job is just finished as Mr. and Mrs. Twit return, and then two ravens drop glue from a paintbrush on the Twits' heads when they return. The Twits go into their home and see the resulting mess. Mrs. Twit is alarmed, thinking they are upside down, so Mr. Twit suggests that they stand on their heads so that they are "the right way up" which traps them in place. The Roly-Poly bird then flies the Muggle-Wumps to Africa so they can be free.

Later, both Mr. and Mrs. Twit are putting all their weight down on their heads and catch the "Dreaded Shrinks" with their bodies compressing "downwards". The Twits' heads shrink into their necks, their necks shrink into their bodies, their bodies shrink into their legs, and their legs shrink into their feet. A week later, the Twits vanish all together, leaving only a pile of old clothes and shoes, and their demise is promptly celebrated by everyone.

== Film adaptation ==
In February 2003, a feature film adaptation of the book entered development at Vanguard Animation with its founder John H. Williams set to produce. As part of a multi-picture deal with Walt Disney Pictures, Vanguard was set to produce a CG animated/live-action film, with John Cleese and Kirk DeMicco writing the screenplay.

In November 2004, Mark Mylod signed up to direct the feature, while Cleese was attached to star in the film. In October 2006, after the executive/regime changes at Disney, the project moved to Working Title and Universal. By January 2012, the official site of Vanguard Animation stated that Conrad Vernon, the director of Shrek 2 (2004) and Monsters vs. Aliens (2009), would direct the film.

By April 2022, an animated television series for Netflix was turned into a feature film. An animated film, directed by Phil Johnston, was released in October 2025.

== Theatrical adaptations ==
In April 1999, a theatrical musical adaptation by Justin Pearson (general manager and the artistic director of the UK's National Symphony Orchestra) and actress Anne Collis, directed by Michael Dineen was presented at The Questors Theatre in Ealing, West London.

A second production of The Twits adapted by Enda Walsh and directed by John Tiffany was performed at London's Royal Court Theatre in 2015, running from 7 April to 31 May. The cast included Jason Watkins as Mr. Twit, Monica Dolan as Mrs. Twit, Glyn Pritchard as the Monkey Father and Cait Davis as the Monkey Mother.

In 2020, during the COVID-19 lockdown, a theatrical reading of The Twits was performed at London's Unicorn Theatre directed by Ned Bennett and performed by Zubin Varla and Martina Laird. The performance was recorded and originally streamed in three parts over YouTube.

== Relations to other Roald Dahl books ==
- A monkey named Muggle-Wump also appears in The Enormous Crocodile.
- A Roly-Poly Bird likewise makes an appearance in The Enormous Crocodile and is also to be found in Dirty Beasts.
- Certain things within the book, such as Mr. Twit's beard, 'Wormy Spaghetti' and bird pie, appear within Roald Dahl's Revolting Recipes.
- The birds' descriptions of Muggle-Wump's sanity ("dotty", "balmy", "batty", "nutty", "screwy", "wacky") are the same as those used by the parents to describe Willy Wonka's sanity in Chapter 18, "Down the Chocolate River", of Charlie and the Chocolate Factory.

== 2023 censorship controversy ==
Despite Roald Dahl having instructed his publishers not to "so much as change a single comma in one of my books", in February 2023 Puffin Books, a division of Penguin Books, announced that it would be re-writing portions of many of Dahl's children's novels, changing the language to, in the publisher's words, "ensure that it can continue to be enjoyed by all today". The decision was met with sharp criticism from groups and public figures including authors Salman Rushdie and Christopher Paolini, British prime minister Rishi Sunak, Queen Camilla, Kemi Badenoch, PEN America, and Brian Cox. Dahl's publishers in the United States, France, and the Netherlands declined to incorporate the changes.

In The Twits, more than a dozen changes were made, including changing "ladies and gentlemen" to "folks" and removing words like batty, nutty, screwy, ugly, and hag.

| Original text | 2023 text |
|---|---|
| In her right hand she carried a walking stick. She used to tell people that this was because she had warts growing on the sole of her left foot and walking was painful. But the real reason she carried a stick was so that she could hit things with it, things like dogs and cats and small children. | In her right hand she carried a walking stick. Not because she needed help walking. But the real reason she carried a stick was so that she could hit things with it, things like dogs and cats and small children. |

== Continuation novel ==
In 2024, it was announced that Greg James and Chris Smith would co-write a continuation novel titled The Twits Next Door illustrated by Emily Jones.

== Editions ==
- ISBN 0-140-86833-X (audio cassette read by Simon Callow, 2001)
- ISBN 0-141-80563-3 (audio CD read by Simon Callow, 2004)
- ISBN 978-0141370378 (audio CD read by Richard Ayoade, 2023)
- ISBN 0-224-06491-6 (hardcover, 2003)
- ISBN 0-14-130107-4 (paperback, 2002)
- ISBN 0-375-82242-9 (hardcover, 2002)
- ISBN 0-14-131138-X (paperback, 2001)
- ISBN 0-14-034640-6 (paperback, 1991)
- ISBN 0-14-031406-7 (paperback, 1982)
- ISBN 0-224-01855-8 (hardcover, 1980)
