= Ryan Gage =

English actor (born 1983)

- Born: Ryan James Gage; 17 January 1983 (age 43); Coventry, England
- Education: Drama Centre London
- Occupations: Actor, voice actor
- Years active: 1995–present
- Agent: United Agents

Ryan Gage (born 17 January 1983) is an English actor who has worked in theatre, television, films, and video games.

On television, he is best known for his roles as King Louis XIII in the BBC series The Musketeers and Ted Bundy in the TV film Serial Thriller: Angel of Decay. In the cinema, he played the Master of Laketown's deputy Alfrid Lickspittle in The Hobbit: The Desolation of Smaug and The Hobbit: The Battle of the Five Armies, and Ted Bundy again (identified as him in the cast list) in the film Angel of Decay, which earned him a Best Actor Award at the British Independent Film Festival in 2016. In video games, Gage has portrayed Charibert in the Final Fantasy XIV expansion pack Final Fantasy XIV: Heavensward. In theatre, he has worked for the Royal Shakespeare Company on plays such as Hamlet, A Midsummer Night's Dream, and Macbeth.

== Early life ==
Gage was born in Coventry. He attended BRIT School and went on to train at the Drama Centre London.

== Theatre ==
Year	Title	Role	Director	Company	Source
2017	The Miser	Cléante	Sean Foley	Mark Goucher Productions/Garrick Theatre	
2013	American Justice	Fenton	Lisa Forrell	Playground Studios/Arts Theatre	
	Ghost Stories	Simon Rifkind	"Andy Nyman", "Jeremy Dyson", and Sean Holmes	Duke of York, "Lyric Hammersmith", and "Liverpool Everyman"	
	The Laws of War	Soldier	Jeremy Herrin	Royal Court Theatre	
	Wages of Thin	Inspector One	Prasanna Puwanarajah, Trevor Griffith	Old Red Lion	
	Quadrophenia	Ace Face	Tom Critchley, Che Walker		
	Artist Descending a Staircase	Martello	Micheal Gieleta, Tom Stoppard	Old Red Lion	
	Hamlet	Osric and Player Queen	Gregory Doran	Royal Shakespeare Company	
	Rosencrantz and Guildenstern Are Dead	Albert	Cressida Brown	Royal Shakespeare Company	
	A Midsummer Night's Dream	Flute	Gregory Doran	Royal Shakespeare Company	
	God in Ruins	Brian Junior and The Homeless Soldier	Anthony Neilson	Royal Shakespeare Company	
	Love's Labour's Lost	Lord	Gregory Doran	Royal Shakespeare Company	
	Macbeth	Soldier	Conal Morrison	Royal Shakespeare Company	
	Macbeth	Donalbain and Young Steward	Silvio Pucuretti	Royal Shakespeare Company	
	Indian Boy	Sparks	Rebecca Gatewood	Royal Shakespeare Company	
	Promises and Lies	Cuddles	Jonathan Church	The Birmingham Repertory Theatre	
2006	Spring Awakening	Melchoir Gabor	Aoifie Smyth	The Union Theatre	
	Wolves and Sheep	Apollonius and Goretsky	Caroline Lynch	Pleasence Theatre	

== TV and filmography ==
=== Feature films and shorts ===
Year	Title	Role	Director	Notes	Source
1995	Judge Dredd	Young Thief	Danny Cannon	Uncredited role	
2007	Outlaw	Manning's Lawyer	Nick Love		
2007	Brixton 85	Drunk Man	Tom Greene	Short Movie	
	Alone Together	Oscar	Daniel Gage	Credited as co-director with Daniel Gage and the film as a "Gage Family" short	
2013	The Hobbit: The Desolation of Smaug	Alfrid Lickspittle	Peter Jackson		
2014	The Hobbit: The Battle of the Five Armies	Alfrid Lickspittle	Peter Jackson		
2015	Scottish Mussel	Ramsey	Talulah Riley		
2016	Angel of Decay	Ted Bundy (identified as "Him" in the cast list)	Jamie Crawford	112 minutes Movie version	
2016	100 Streets	Vincent	Jim O'Hanlon		
	Days in Between	Sean	Tom Greene		
	Headphones	Barry	Tom Shkolnik		

=== Television series ===
Year	Title	Role	Episode(s)	Source
1999	The Bill	Carl Buxton	Ep.:"Love and War: Part 1" (Season 15, episode 64)	
2006	Hustle	Billy	Ep.: "Price for Fame" (Season 3, episode 1)	
2009	Holby City	Russell Cobden	Ep.: "The Honeymoon's Over" (Season 11, episode 35)	
2010	Doctors	Nathan Hadler	Ep.: "A Taste of Freedom" (Season 11, episode 183)	
2011	Hollyoaks	Johnny	Eps.: 1.3073 and 1.3075	
2014–2016	The Musketeers	King Louis XIII	All episodes except "The Return" (Season 2, episode 5) and "We Are the Garrison" (Season 3, episode 10)	
2017	Red Dwarf	Adolf Hitler	Ep.: Cured (Season 12, episode 1)	
2019	Endeavour	Ludo Talenti	Ep.: "Oracle" (Season 7, episode 1), Ep.: "Raga" (Season 7, episode 2), Ep.: "Zenana" (Season 7, episode 3)	
2022	Father Brown	Finbar Finch	Ep.: "The Enigma of Antigonish" (Season 9, episode 9")	
2023	Queen Charlotte: A Bridgerton Story	George, Prince of Wales	Eps.: 1, 5 & 6	
2025	Robin Hood	Spragart		

=== Direct-to-video and television films ===
Year	Title	Role	Director	Notes	Source
2009	Hamlet	Osric and Player Queen	Gregory Doran		
2013	Murder on the Home Front	Danny Hastings			
2015	Serial Thriller: Angel of Decay	Ted Bundy (identified as "Him" in the cast list)	Jamie Crawford	TV miniseries of 3 episodes	
2015	The Gamechangers	Journalist / Presenter / Crowd (voice)	Owen Harris		

=== Video games ===
Year	Title	Role	Voice Director	Notes	Source
2014	Final Fantasy XIV: Heavensward	Charibert	Matt Delamere		
2015	Bloodborne	Micolash – Host of the Nightmare / Mob A			
2019	Final Fantasy XIV: Shadowbringers	Wedge, Irvithe, Eulmoran Adjutant, Aenc Thon			
