= Taylor Media =

Australian film and television production company

Taylor Media is an Australian film and television production company founded in 1991 by Sue Taylor. The company has produced children's dramas (Minty, Southern Cross, Time Trackers), mini-series (The Shark Net), documentaries (Courting With Justice), feature films (Last Train to Freo, Looking for Grace, The Tree and Three Summers.)

== Founder ==
Sue Taylor has been a filmmaker for over twenty five years, She established her own company, Taylor Media in Australia in 2001. A graduate in anthropology from London University, she began her career as a journalist in the UK before moving to Perth, Australia and into television production in the early 1980s.

=== Documentary ===
Sue Taylor later produced a book documenting the recollections from childhood to old age of Ethel May Elvin who was born in 1906 in a poor working-class family and lived to the start of the 21st century.

== See also ==
- List of film production companies
- List of television production companies
