= Dirty Beasts =

1983 poetry collection by Road Dahl

First edition

Dirty Beasts is a 1983 collection of Roald Dahl poems about unsuspecting animals. Intended to be a follow-up to Revolting Rhymes, the original Jonathan Cape edition was illustrated by Rosemary Fawcett. In 1984, a revised edition was published with illustrations by Quentin Blake.

== Poems ==
The book contains nine poems, telling of the unusual exploits of unsuspecting real animals (save for the Tummy Beast, who is made up). They are as follows:

- "The Pig" – When a genius pig realizes that he is born for humans to eat, he turns on his owner the farmer and eats him instead.
- "The Crocodile" – An unnamed father tells his son in bed about Crocky-Wock, a crocodile who eats six children each Saturday, preferably three boys (whom he smears with mustard to make them hot) and three girls (whom he dips in butterscotch and caramel for a sweet taste). Little did they know that Crocky-Wock is more than just a tale...
- "The Lion" – The narrator (depicted as a waiter) asks the lion what his favourite meat is in the form of attempting to offer numerous meaty dishes (including a live hen), but each attempt ends in failure and every single one of them is turned away. The lion then states to the narrator, "The meat I am about to chew is neither steak nor chops. IT'S YOU!"
- "The Scorpion" – The poem starts off with a description of Sting-a-ling, an emperor scorpion who intends to sting people's rumps when they are in bed. It then proceeds with a boy telling his mother that something's crawling towards his rear-end and he is then stung by Sting-a-ling.
- "The Anteater" – Roy is a spoiled boy who lives "somewhere near San Francisco Bay", pondering what to get next (he was bored with his usual supplies of toys and shoes); he decides on an exotic pet, choosing a giant anteater. It took a while for his father to get one, finally buying one from an Indian man who sold his pet for ₹50,000. The animal arrives half-starved and begging for food, but the stubborn brat cruelly sends him off to find some ants, ignoring the fact that the anteater finds none. On that very day, Roy's Aunt Dorothy comes to visit and Roy demands that the anteater greet his Aunt Dorothy (the narrator gives a quick explanation that Americans are predisposed to say some words incorrectly (like Ant instead of Aunt and kant instead of can't)). Upon hearing of an 83-year-old ant, the anteater devours the aunt, while Roy hides in the manure shed. However, the anteater finds him and decides Roy is his afters (presumably in revenge for being malnourished by the boy).
- "The Porcupine" – A girl buys sweets on Saturday with her weekly money (50p) and sits down on a nice "rock", which she does not realize is a porcupine. She runs home to tell her mother, who (despite her daughter's protests) sternly refuses to take the quills out herself. Instead, she takes her daughter to the dentist, Mr. Myers, who takes great pleasure in removing the quills for 50 guineas. Unlike the other stories in the book, this story does not involve the namesake animal throughout, only mentioned when the girl sits on it and at the end as she is warning the reader to be aware of it if they want to sit down.
- "The Cow" – A cow named Miss Milky Daisy suddenly sprouts a pair of gold and silver wings due to having two bumps on her back. Daisy quickly becomes a celebrity and everyone adores her "except for one quite horrid man who travelled from Afghanistan," who loudly insults the flying cow. Angered by this rude behaviour, Daisy drops a cowpat on him.
- "The Toad and the Snail" – While playing in a park fountain, the narrator (depicted as a young boy) is approached by a toad the size of a pig, reminding the boy of his Auntie Emily. The boy and the Toad leap all over England and eventually arrive in France. The local people are amazed by the size of the toad and prepare to cook the Toad and eat his legs. The toad, who often goes to France to tease the locals, presses a button on his head, turning him into a giant snail. Despite this change to prevent his demise, the Frenchmen start up once again, attempting to get a taste of the snail. Nevertheless, the snail pulls a lever on his shell and becomes the Roly-Poly Bird. The boy and the bird then fly back to the fountain where the tale started, and the boy keeps his adventure a secret. This is the only tale to feature more than one animal. It is also the longest.
- "The Tummy Beast" – A fat boy tells his mother that some creature is living in his tummy, but his mother refuses to believe the child and, as punishment for this horrible "excuse," she sends him to his room. However, a voice erupts from the boy's tummy, telling him that if he does not get something to eat it will twist his guts. The boy asks his mother if she believes him now, but she does not answer, having fainted.

== Adaptations ==
=== Audio ===
An audiobook adaption of the story released in the 1980s features the stories read by Prunella Scales and Timothy West; Scales narrated "The Pig", "The Scorpion", "The Porcupine", "The Cow" and "The Tummy Beast", while West narrated the rest. In the audio book version, "The Crocodile" was moved so that it would be told after "The Cow", while "The Tummy Beast" was moved to be told before "The Toad and the Snail".

Additional audiobook adaptions included one from 1998 that was narrated by Pam Ferris and Geoffrey Palmer, and a release from 2002 that featured Alan Cumming; which was combined with Revolting Rhymes. The current 2014 digital version of the audiobook by Penguin is read by Miriam Margolyes, Stephen Mangan and Tamsin Greig.

=== Animation ===
The story was adapted into an original video animation (OVA) by Abbey Broadcast Communications in 1990, which was released straight-to-video through Abbey Home Entertainment. It was a faithful adaption of the original story, which was told through Scales and West's audiobook recordings against animations in the style of Quentin Blake's illustrations. Re-releases from 1997 onwards redubbed Scales and West's narration with Martin Clunes and Dawn French in the respective stories.

=== Music ===
Dirty Beasts is Martin Butler’s musical setting of "The Pig", "The Tummy Beast", and "The Crocodile" for narrator accompanied by wind quintet and piano.
