= Judy Pascoe =

Australian author

- Born: Judy Pascoe; Brisbane, Australia
- Occupation: Writer
- Spouse: Robert Llewellyn
- Children: 2
- Writing career
- Period: 21st century

Judy Pascoe is the Australian author of the book Our Father Who Art in the Tree. The book was made into the 2010 feature film The Tree.

== Biography ==
Born and educated in Brisbane, Australia, Judy spent several years as an acrobat, touring with Circus Oz, before turning to writing and stand-up comedy.

She is married to English actor Robert Llewellyn, known for his role as Kryten in Red Dwarf, in which she appeared in the episode "Camille". They have two children and live in Gloucestershire, England.

Pascoe was in Circus Oz from 1983 to 1987. Her main act was balancing a chopstick and three eggs on her nose. After leaving the circus she moved to the UK and did a series of solo performances on the UK comedy circuit, touring with people like Jo Brand, Alan Davies and Jack Dee. Judy met her husband at the Edinburgh festival.

More recently Judy writes and paints under the name J.M. Pascoe.

== Bibliography ==
- Our Father Who Art in the Tree (2002) (debut novel)
- Dreaming in French (2009)
