= Dimension Jump (Red Dwarf episode) =

- Red Dwarf episode
- Episode no.: Series 4 Episode 5
- Directed by: Ed Bye
- Written by: Rob Grant; Doug Naylor
- Original air date: 14 March 1991

Guest appearances
- Simon Gaffney as Young Rimmer; Kalli Greenwood as Mrs Rimmer; Hetty Baynes as Cockpit Computer

Episode chronology
← Previous "White Hole"	Next → "Meltdown"
- Red Dwarf IV

"Dimension Jump" is the fifth episode of science fiction sit-com Red Dwarf Series IV and the twenty-third episode in the series run.

It was first broadcast on the British television channel BBC2 on 14 March 1991 and was written by Rob Grant and Doug Naylor, and directed by Ed Bye.

The episode, featuring the first appearance of Ace Rimmer, was intended to end the series; but Meltdown was rescheduled and broadcast last due to the Gulf War.

== Plot ==
In a parallel dimension, Arnold Rimmer (Chris Barrie) is a test pilot in the Space Corps under the name 'Ace' Rimmer and is a popular, brave and a charming, good-looking person. The others from Red Dwarf live alternate lives as well – Dave Lister (Craig Charles) is a Head Technician in the Corps; Cat (Danny John-Jules) is human and a priest; Kryten (Robert Llewellyn) is human and Rimmer's superior; and Holly (Hattie Hayridge) is human and Kryten's secretary. Returning from a mission, Ace is given the task of test-flying a dimension-jumping prototype spacecraft on a potentially one-way mission. After saying farewell, he departs and initiates the jump.

Meanwhile, Lister, Kryten, Cat and Holly are forced to take Rimmer along on a fishing trip to a nearby ocean planet. As they are heading out, their Starbug collides with Ace's spaceship and crashes on the planet. Ace follows after to rescue them, and promptly makes friends with Lister, while in contrast Rimmer develops a mutual dislike of him.

After Starbug is repaired and the group return to Red Dwarf, Lister and Rimmer talk about Ace. While Lister is in awe of him, Rimmer reveals disgust that he embodies all of the "breaks" he never received while growing up, and fails to be convinced to be happy that another version of himself was successful. Ace later meets with Lister and reveals that he plans to leave, unable to bear the kind of person he is in this dimension.

Ace tells Lister of the point of divergence in Rimmer's life; when he was young, Rimmer was threatened with being held back a year in school – while Rimmer was able to progress further, Ace was kept back. Ace says that the humiliation prompted him to change and work harder, and was the "break" in his life. Ace soon bids Lister farewell and proceeds on an impossible search to find a worse off Rimmer in another universe.

== Production ==
The idea behind this episode came as a result of Chris Barrie (simultaneously filming this series while playing Gordon Brittas, another character disliked by those around him in The Brittas Empire) asking Rob Grant and Doug Naylor for the chance to play someone heroic, suffering from what he described as "git overload".

The ending scene went through numerous changes. The plan was to have Rimmer drop a load of kippers on Ace, but it didn't work on comic or practical levels. Since this didn't work well, the text scroll was added in the post production.

Several models for the episode were produced, including Ace's ship, the Io city dome and the Space Corps test space station. Filming of Ace's ship crashing into Starbug involved flying it through space on wires. The Starbug crash site was achieved using an ocean moon miniature construction.

For the first time in the series run, the end theme tune was changed. The director, Ed Bye, requested a "naff organ sound" to end the episode. In keeping with the Rimmer theme, Howard Goodall performed an instrumental arrangement over the end credits.

The regular cast all get to play their alternative universe roles. Chris Barrie plays Ace Rimmer, Craig Charles is Spanners, Danny John-Jules is the Chaplain, Robert Llewellyn is Bongo, and Hattie Hayridge got the chance to play more than just a computer head as Mellie. Kalli Greenwood appeared as Mrs. Rimmer and Simon Gaffney appeared as Young Rimmer—reprising their roles from Polymorph (and Simon also appeared as young Rimmer in "Timeslides"), while Hetty Baynes voiced the Cockpit Computer.

Grant and Naylor's script for the episode was collected in the 1993 book Primordial Soup.

== Cultural references ==
The spaceship scene introducing Ace Rimmer parodies the 1986 Tom Cruise movie Top Gun and even features similar heroic music.

== Reception ==
The episode was broadcast on the British television channel BBC2 on 14 March 1991.

Considered to be one of the best episodes by many, it also topped the Series IV list in a Red Dwarf magazine poll—with 7.3% of the vote. In the Series IV DVD, Chris Barrie names this as his favourite episode.

== See also ==
- Backwards – the fourth Red Dwarf novel features the plot of "Dimension Jump" as well as other episodes.
