= Meltdown (Red Dwarf) =

- Red Dwarf episode
- Episode no.: Series 4 Episode 6
- Directed by: Ed Bye
- Written by: Rob Grant; Doug Naylor
- Original air date: 21 March 1991

Guest appearances
- Clayton Mark as Elvis Presley; Kenneth Hadley as Adolf Hitler; Martin Friend as Albert Einstein; Stephen Tiller as Pythagoras; Jack Klaff as Abraham Lincoln; Tony Hawks as Caligula; Michael Burrell as Pope Gregory; Forbes Masson as Stan Laurel; Roger Blake as Noël Coward; Pauline Bailey as Marilyn Monroe; Charles Reynolds as Mahatma Gandhi

Episode chronology
← Previous "Dimension Jump"	Next → "Holoship"
- Red Dwarf IV

"Meltdown" is the sixth, and final, episode of science fiction sitcom Red Dwarf Series IV and the twenty-fourth episode in the series run.

It was first broadcast on the British television channel BBC2 on 21 March 1991. It was written by Rob Grant and Doug Naylor, and directed by Ed Bye.

The episode, featuring Wax-Droids of famous historical figures involved in a war of good versus evil, was originally supposed to open the series but was postponed due to the Gulf War.

== Plot ==
Kryten (Robert Llewellyn) discovers a matter transporter paddle in the research lab of Red Dwarf – a device capable of transmitting an individual as light beams to another point in space within 500,000 light-years. Kryten and Arnold Rimmer (Chris Barrie) are sent to test the device by travelling to an interesting planet with breathable air within range of the ship, When the pair reach the planet, they find a number of unrealistic-looking dinosaur-like creatures, and are then taken prisoner by Elvis Presley (Clayton Mark) and Pope Gregory XIII (Michael Burrell) wielding guns.

After some time, the paddle returns to Dave Lister (Craig Charles) and Cat (Danny John-Jules), who follow after their friends. However, the pair find themselves seemingly transported through time, materializing in a war room somewhere in the Third Reich and thrown into jail on the orders of Adolf Hitler (Kenneth Hadley), with the device being confiscated.

Kryten and Rimmer discover that the group have travelled to Wax-World, a theme park inhabited by wax-droids—animatronic replicas of famous real-life and fictional characters in human history. The pair discover that since the park was abandoned, the droids gained sentience over time, but divided into two warring factions – "Heroes" and "Villains" – with the heroes being on the brink of defeat as their captured comrades are melted down and turned into more villains.

Meanwhile in their jail cell, Lister and Cat, after observing a parade of villains from different eras of history executing Winnie the Pooh, are brought up to speed on the situation by a captured Abraham Lincoln (Jack Klaff). They escape an interrogation about the matter paddle conducted by Caligula (Tony Hawks) and Gregory Rasputin, and make it back to the Heroes' HQ.

Rimmer trains the heroic wax-droids up into a fighting unit, detaining Lister and Cat after the former objects, and devises a strategy to send in the heroes in as a distraction, while Kryten is smuggled into the Villains' Third Reich HQ and turns up the building's thermostat to melt them. The plan succeeds and the device is recovered, though Rimmer is forced to admit that all the droids were destroyed as a result. Disgusted by the pointlessness of war and Rimmer's plan, Lister requests Rimmer's hologram-projecting light bee and swallows it, assuring Kryten he will be okay for the next couple of days, before the group use the paddle to return to Red Dwarf.

== Production ==
For the scene transitional cuts the usual Red Dwarf model shots were replaced by a technique of stretching the shot, cutting then releasing it back. These scenes were produced in post-production and were accompanied by a military style drum riff.

The intentionally unconvincing monsters of Wax World's prehistoric section were taken from footage of the kaiju movie Daikyojū Gappa (1967).

The many guest appearances included Clayton Mark as wax-droid Elvis Presley, Kenneth Hadley as wax-droid Adolf Hitler, Martin Friend as wax-droid Albert Einstein, Stephen Tiller as wax-droid Pythagoras, Jack Klaff as wax-droid Abraham Lincoln, Tony Hawks as wax-droid Caligula, Michael Burrell as wax-droid Pope Gregory, Forbes Masson as wax-droid Stan Laurel, Roger Blake as wax-droid Noël Coward and Pauline Bailey as wax-droid Marilyn Monroe.

For the second time in as many episodes, the arrangement of the end theme tune was changed. The tune itself was retained as normal; however, the lyrics were sung by the Elvis wax-droid instead of by Jenna Russell.

== Reception ==
The episode was first broadcast on the British television channel BBC2 on 21 March 1991.

Because of the Gulf War conflict at the time the BBC decided to place the episode back in the running order. When the hostilities had ceased the episode was able to be broadcast at the end of the series' run.

Although Series IV performed well overall in the Red Dwarf magazine poll, "Meltdown" was considered the least favourite from the series, gaining 1.3% of the overall votes.

One review in 2004 said that "this episode gets overlooked because fans feel it's hokey", but added "there really are a lot of laughs to be had here."

In the Series IV DVD commentary, the cast talk about how most fans dislike the episode, speculating that perhaps it wasn't 'space-y' enough. In contrast, the cast all talk about their love for it and how many classic scenes it contains.

Sophie Davies writing in 2017 for CultBox said that the episode "is a bit of an underwhelming finale to Red Dwarf IV and for me it's the weakest episode of the series", and said that the sequence of Lister witnessing the summary execution of Winnie the Pooh is a "probably the episode's highlight".
