= Red Dwarf VIII =

Series of television

- Starring: Chris Barrie; Craig Charles; Danny John-Jules; Robert Llewellyn; Chloë Annett; Norman Lovett
- No. of episodes: 8

Release
- Original network: BBC Two
- Original release: 18 February – 5 April 1999

Series chronology
- ← Previous; Red Dwarf VII Next → Red Dwarf: Back to Earth

Red Dwarf VIII is the eighth series of the British science fiction sitcom Red Dwarf. It consists of eight episodes and was broadcast on UK television channel BBC Two in February to April 1999. It was written by Doug Naylor (with two episodes co-written by Paul Alexander), and was directed by Ed Bye.

The series follows the return to the spaceship Red Dwarf of Dave Lister (Craig Charles), Cat (Danny John-Jules) and Kryten (Robert Llewellyn), and Kristine Kochanski (Chloë Annett) and their subsequent imprisonment by a resurrected crew that they are surprised exists.

The series features the return of Arnold Rimmer (Chris Barrie), Lister's former boss and now his cellmate, and Holly (Norman Lovett), the ship's computer, as regular characters, along with the reappearance of Mac McDonald as Captain Hollister.

== Writing and production ==
Red Dwarf VII was the first after creator and writer Rob Grant had left; the other creator, Doug Naylor, had written episodes solo or with co-writers, and the series moved to a largely single camera setup without a studio audience.

Series VIII was mostly written by Naylor solo, with Paul Alexander co-writing on two episodes, and returned to having a studio audience.

The opener, "Back in the Red", was originally planned as an hour-long special, but over-ran. Additional scenes were written and filmed to make three full episodes. "Pete" had originally been intended as a single episode, and the series would have ended with a two-parter involving the crew returning to Earth; but due to budgetary issues "Pete" was instead extended to two parts. An originally planned ending for "Only The Good..." was abandoned after being shot and left as a cliffhanger.

With 52 episodes, the series was now in a good position for international syndication and the prospect of a feature-length film increased.

== Casting ==
The regular cast, including Chloë Annett's Kochanski returned, along with Chris Barrie, portraying a recreated version of Arnold Rimmer before the accident and Norman Lovett's Holly.

They were joined by a large cast of supporting characters, including Mac McDonald reappearing as Captain Hollister and new characters such as fellow prisoner Kill Crazy and prison governor Ackerman played by Jake Wood and Graham McTavish. Selby and Chen, who had appeared in Series I, also reappeared, played by David Gillespie and Andy Taylor. Mark Williams and Robert Bathurst, who had played Petersen and Todhunter respectively, were not available.

Guest stars included Geraldine McEwan as the title character in "Cassandra" and Ricky Grover as fellow prisoner Baxter in "Pete" and the finale "Only the Good...". Director Ed Bye makes a small appearance as the Grim Reaper in the final episode.

== Plot ==
In the opening story, the three-part "Back in the Red", the crew, arriving to a newly reconstructed Red Dwarf on Starbug, crash, and are arrested, discovering that the original crew has been reconstructed as well. By the end of the story, Lister, Kochanski, the Cat and Kryten are placed in a previously unrevealed Red Dwarf prison deck, with Lister and Rimmer bunking together, as they had earlier in the show.

Episodes after this feature a mix of Porridge-style prison plots, along adventures outside of the spaceship using the conceit that Lister and company have signed up for the Canaries, a disposable team of prisoners sent to investigate hazardous environments.

== Broadcast and reception ==
The series was broadcast by BBC2 starting in January 1999 and received Red Dwarf's strongest audiences, with 8.05 million viewers if the Sunday repeat is included.

KTEH, a Public Broadcasting Service (PBS) station in San Jose, California, broadcast the entire series on 7 March 1999. As a result, they broadcast the last five episodes of Series VIII before they were aired in the UK. "Cassandra" was also broadcast on other PBS stations on that date, as well.

Writing in 2015, Den of Geek ranked Red Dwarf VIII the worst full series of the show, saying that although that "it's fun to see Captain Hollister and co for a while, the novelty wears off fast. In contrast to previous episodes, too much of the writing here simply fell flat with Naylor clearly struggling as sole writer." In 2018 CultBox agreed that it was the "weakest series", saying that "Although the seventh series has its problems, it still feels like Red Dwarf, whereas the eighth frequently feels like it belongs to a dumber, broader, lazier show.".

== Episodes ==
No. overall	No. in series	Title	Directed by	Written by	Original release date	Prod. code	Viewers (millions)
45	1	"Back in the Red: Part I"	Ed Bye	Doug Naylor	18 February 1999	1	6.21
The nanobots have rebuilt Red Dwarf to its original design plans. In effect, the fresh new Red Dwarf is better than the old version of the ship the nanobots deconstructed in the first place—faster, more streamlined, containing more advanced technology, which was not included the first time round due to budget cutbacks. After crashing Starbug in the docking bay, they discover the nanobots have also resurrected the original crew complement of Red Dwarf who were killed in the radioactive disaster three million years previously, and who now have no memory of the incident or events following it. Lister tries to persuade the newly resurrected Arnold Rimmer to help him escape so that he can track down the nanobots to corroborate his story, but the only way for Lister to convince Rimmer is by helping Rimmer get promoted using a disc of confidential files left in the crashed wreckage of Starbug.
46	2	"Back in the Red: Part II"	Ed Bye	Doug Naylor	25 February 1999	2	5.36
Lister, the Cat and Kochanski are in big trouble aboard the resurrected Red Dwarf with the freshly resurrected Captain Hollister (Mac McDonald), and they find themselves standing trial for stealing and crashing a Starbug. Kryten is reprogrammed and has his factory settings restored, while Rimmer uses the confidential files and the luck and sexual magnetism viruses found in the wreckage of the Starbug to get himself promoted in the field.
47	3	"Back in the Red: Part III"	Ed Bye	Doug Naylor	4 March 1999	8	5.22
Lister, Kochanski, Cat and Kryten flee Red Dwarf in a Blue Midget and try to find the nanobots to prove that their version events is true. Rimmer intervenes to try to save his own neck and messes things up for all of them.
48	4	"Cassandra"	Ed Bye	Doug Naylor	7 March 1999 (US); 11 March 1999 (UK)	3	4.09
Rimmer, Lister, Cat, Kryten and Kochanski have been sentenced to two years in "The Tank" on secretive Floor 13, for stealing and crashing a Starbug and abusing confidential information during their trial in virtual reality. Lister signs up the gang for the Canaries, thinking it is the prison choir and enticed by the list of privileges that go with it. Lister is unaware the Canaries is actually a convict army utilised for reconnaissance on uncharted planets. Their first assignment is to investigate an abandoned spaceship on an ocean planet, where they discover Cassandra (Geraldine McEwan), a computer that can predict the future. However, it spells bad news for Rimmer, when Cassandra predicts that he is going to die.
49	5	"Krytie TV"	Ed Bye	Doug Naylor and Paul Alexander	7 March 1999 (US); 18 March 1999 (UK)	6	4.81
Kryten has been placed in the women's wing of the Tank, due to his lack of male genitalia. After making the mistake of revealing that he showers with the female prisoners, Kryten is reprogrammed by Kill Crazy, making him a ruthless and amoral entrepreneur. Kryten soon puts on "Krytie TV", a pirate entertainment show for the prisoners, where he goes into the women's shower room and films the exposed naked bodies of the female prisoners, including Kochanski. Rimmer and Lister have been given a retrial, and Kryten endangers their only chance of freedom when he sets up Lister by getting him to mess up governor Ackerman's sleeping quarters.
50	6	"Pete: Part I"	Ed Bye	Doug Naylor	7 March 1999 (US); 25 March 1999 (UK)	4	4.57
Rimmer and Lister are not having a good time, frequently in and out of the captain's office for offences, each of which annoy Hollister more and more until he snaps and has them thrown in "the hole", a sparse prison cell inhabited only by an insane Welshman called Birdman and his pet sparrow, Pete. Meanwhile, the others return from a Canaries mission with a "time wand", a device that can manipulate time.
51	7	"Pete: Part II"	Ed Bye	Doug Naylor and Paul Alexander	7 March 1999 (US); 1 April 1999 (UK)	7	4.52
Lister and Rimmer drive Captain Hollister ever closer to a nervous breakdown. Kryten discovers the time wand can regress a living creature back into what it evolved from, and turns Baxter and Kill Crazy into apes. He also accidentally regresses Pete, Birdman's pet sparrow, into a Tyrannosaurus rex which then goes on a rampage around Red Dwarf and eats the Birdman, along with the time wand. With the rest of the crew frozen in time, Rimmer, Lister, Kryten, Kochanski, the Cat and Holly attempt to find a solution before the freeze wears off.
52	8	"Only the Good..."	Ed Bye	Doug Naylor	7 March 1999 (US); 5 April 1999 (UK)	5	4.24
An escape pod containing a genetically engineered virus that eats metal arrives on Red Dwarf and begins to destroy the ship. Left on Red Dwarf to die, Rimmer, Lister, Cat, Kryten, Kochanski and Holly find their only chance at finding an antidote is to create a mirror universe where everything is opposite. Rimmer is sent into the mirror universe to find the antidote before Red Dwarf is destroyed. In the mirror universe, Rimmer finds what he has always wanted—he is no longer a lowly technician but the captain of the ship.

== Home video ==
Red Dwarf VIII was released on VHS in November 1999 and January 2000. It was released on DVD in March 2006.
