= Pete (Red Dwarf) =

- Red Dwarf episodes
- Episode nos.: Series 8 Episodes 6–7
- Directed by: Ed Bye
- Written by: Doug Naylor (Part 1); Doug Naylor Paul Alexander (Part 2)
- Original air dates: 7 March 1999 (US, Parts I & II); 25 March 1999 (UK, Part I); 1 April 1999 (UK, Part II)

Guest appearances
- Mac McDonald as Captain Hollister; Graham McTavish as Warden Ackerman; Shend as Warden Knot; Jake Wood as Kill Crazy; Andrew Alston as Mex; Holly Earl as Young Kochanski; Perri Michael as Young Cat; Ricky Grover as Baxter; Ian Masters as Birdman

Episode chronology
← Previous "Krytie TV"	Next → "Only the Good..."
- Red Dwarf VIII

"Pete" is a two-part episode from the science fiction sitcom Red Dwarf's eighth series. Part I was first broadcast in the United States on 7 March 1999 and then on the British television channel BBC2 on 25 March 1999. The second part was broadcast the same day as the first part in the US and on 1 April for the British broadcast. The first part was written by Doug Naylor and the second was written between Naylor and Paul Alexander. Both parts were directed by Ed Bye. The two parts (the second in particular) are often collectively cited as among the weakest examples of a Red Dwarf story in the show's history.

== Plot ==
=== Part One ===
The story begins with Lister (Craig Charles) and Rimmer (Chris Barrie) being escorted to see Captain Hollister (Mac McDonald) in his office. Hollister is with Warden Ackerman (Graham McTavish) on whom they played a prank. The prank in question concerned Ackerman and a truth serum; Hollister reports him "rushing onto the bridge this morning, apologising for being late, saying he had been having 'jiggy jiggy' with the science officer's wife and had not allowed enough time to change out of his Batman outfit." Their punishment pits a team of their choice against Ackerman and the prison guards in a game of basketball.

After the first half, the crew are losing badly. Lister's team consists of him, Rimmer, the Cat (Danny John-Jules), Kryten (Robert Llewellyn), and Kochanski (Chloë Annett). Rimmer and Lister tell the others that their opponents' half-time drinks had been spiked with a sort of Viagra. This is noticed in the next half, with the crew winning against the guards, who are forced to bend over to cover their erections.

The next day, Rimmer and Lister are back in Hollister's office, caught out after the captain also sampled the drink. They are given 'spud duty' for the next two weeks. Spud duty involves peeling a mountain of potatoes. That evening, Rimmer finds out that Lister has been using Bob the Skutter to get things Lister wanted, such as curry and lager. Rimmer asks Lister to get them a programmable virus which they can set to eat potato skins, meaning they would not have to do any work.

Meanwhile, Kryten, Kochanski, and the Cat are taken to another ship on a Canaries mission to find an earlier team that went missing. They find a team with a strange 'time wand' which is found to download and digitize time. Kryten realises this could hold the key to getting out of prison, as they could use it to hit Red Dwarf with a two-year download so it would appear they've served their sentences. He wipes the memory of the previous Canaries team and sneaks the time wand back.

On the first day of spud duty, Bob delivers the virus to Lister. Not only are the potatoes skinned; the duo's clothes and hair are also removed. They are taken to Hollister, stark naked. Hollister tells them that they'll sent to the hole if they do anything wrong again. In shaking their superior's hand the virus is passed on and Hollister quickly begins losing his hair and clothes. He sentences them to two months in the hole.

Rimmer and Lister enter the hole (a small square cell) to find they're sharing it with a fellow prisoner called Birdman (Ian Masters) and his sparrow, Pete. However their stay in the hole is not long as Bob the Skutter breaks them out. The three walk through Red Dwarf to find everyone frozen except Kryten, Kochanski, and the Cat who are waiting for them in the cargo bay (with Kryten using the time wand to restore Lister and Rimmer's hair). However it seems the excitement of escaping has killed Pete, and Birdman is upset to lose his friend. Kryten decides to use the time wand to restore Pete to life, however it goes badly wrong as Kryten accidentally reverses the sparrow's evolution and turns it into a massive Tyrannosaurus. Birdman is promptly eaten, before Pete starts to chase the Dwarfers.

=== Part Two ===
While running from the dinosaur he accidentally created Kryten throws the Time Wand to Bob the Skutter, who then gets eaten by Pete. After hiding in a room next to the cargo bay, Lister consults Holly who gives them the expert opinion of "You're finished". Meanwhile, in Pete's stomach, Bob presses buttons on the Time Wand which unfreezes everybody else on the ship. The Dwarfers then decide to make a cow vindaloo curry with roughage in it. After Pete eats it, they find out it was too hot for him. All the yelling from Pete gets the others caught.

Lister and Rimmer are, for the fourth time, seen returning to Hollister's office. They find out that all of Hollister's favourite foods (mint choc chip ice-cream, orange ice pops and Coca-Cola) have been eaten by Pete who then burped, farted, vomited, and had a diarrhoea attack on the people who were trying to capture him (with Bob being ejected this way, landing on the Captain's head). Hollister returns to them the Time Wand and tells them to turn Pete back into a bird.

The Canaries are deployed to attempt to turn Pete the Dinosaur back into Pete the Sparrow. Then two inmates, Kill Crazy (Jake Wood)) and Baxter (Ricky Grover), stop Lister and Rimmer and steal the Time Wand and accidentally put their bodies on a separate timeline than themselves. Kill Crazy and Baxter end up trying to beat Rimmer and Lister up but nothing happens to them.

Meanwhile, Kochanski finds out Kryten made a penis to get out of being classified as a woman. But his penis, Archie, had run away. Eventually, they find out Archie had ended up in the Cat's pocket and woke up, trying to burst out of his Canary uniform.

Rimmer and Lister are back in Hollister's office. He tells them to recover the Time Wand. But before they leave, the effects of being beaten up by Baxter and Kill Crazy catch up with them, and they are beaten out of the office.

It turns out Kill Crazy and Baxter, unable to use the Time Wand, had turned themselves into gorillas. They recover the Time Wand and bring back Birdman and evolve Pete back into a sparrow. Rimmer tells Lister to destroy the Time Wand and he does. Walking back, they notice a dinosaur egg, leading Rimmer to tell Lister to repair the Time Wand. After they fail to that, two legs break out of the egg's shell. The egg runs into a lift up to a floor Hollister's in. When the lift returns, the egg is broken. Hollister, enjoying a massage, is licked by the dinosaur who then roars.

For the sixth time, Rimmer and Lister are back in Hollister's office. He is so traumatised that he can only communicate with paper with writing on it. Rimmer and Lister appear to be given a year in the Hole, but as they leave, Hollister reveals that the isolation is for him. The episode ends with Hollister showing them a piece of paper with "See ya in twelve months" written on it.

== Production ==
Originally titled "Captain's Office", the episode was re-written as a two parter. Cut scenes from "Cassandra" were included in the episode.

The Pete dinosaur was created using computer generated software similar to the ones in Jurassic Park. The CG Pete dinosaur was combined with interactive animatronic parts; a huge foot and head were produced for close up shots.

Some scenes had to be cut from the final episode, which included a fight sequence between the Pete dinosaur and Kryten. Another scene cut was Rimmer's attempt to compose an ode to the Captain.

Mac McDonald appeared as Captain Hollister, Graham McTavish played Governor Ackerman, Andrew Alston played Canary Mex, Holly Earl as Young Kochanski, Perri Michael as Young Cat, Ricky Grover played Baxter, Shend played Warden Knot, Ian Masters appeared as Birdman, and Jake Wood as Kill Crazy.

== Reviews ==
Sophie Davis of CultBox said in 2018 that "Red Dwarf continues to feel less and less like itself in 'Pete: Part I'", and "'Pete: Part II' is frequently named as Red Dwarf's worst episode of all time, and for good reason. It's all very puerile and not particularly funny". Tom Salinsky wrote in his 2025 book that he second part "is very feeble, disjointed, uninspiring stuff for the most part."

== Cultural references ==
- During the basketball game, the song Stomp! by The Brothers Johnson is played.
- Bob The Skutter whistles the tune from The Great Escape.
- Kryten's penis Archie wriggles up Cat's top and then bursts out, in a scene parodying Alien.
