= Only the Good... =

- Red Dwarf episode
- Episode no.: Series 8 Episode 8
- Directed by: Ed Bye
- Written by: Doug Naylor
- Original air dates: 7 March 1999 (US); 5 April 1999 (UK)

Guest appearances
- Mac McDonald as Captain Hollister; Graham McTavish as Warden Ackerman; Ricky Grover as Baxter; Heidi Monsen as Talia; Tony Slattery as Dispensing Machine; David Verrey as Big Meat

Episode chronology
← Previous "Pete"	Next → "Red Dwarf: Back to Earth"
- Red Dwarf VIII

"Only the Good..." is the final episode in the eighth series and the original run of the British science fiction series Red Dwarf. It was first shown in the UK on 5 April 1999 in the 9:00 pm BBC2 time slot, and was written by Doug Naylor and directed by Ed Bye. The episode also marks the final regular appearance of Chloë Annett as Kochanski. This would be the last series of Red Dwarf to be broadcast on BBC2. Red Dwarf: Back to Earth would be the next instalment of the series.

== Plot ==
The episode begins with a few lines of text explaining that the starship Hermes has been destroyed by a synthetic, highly corrosive micro-organism. An escape pod from the ship carries a lone survivor, Talia Garrett. The pod and the woman are picked up by Red Dwarf, but it is revealed that the microbe has also been brought on board when part of the empty escape pod dissolves away.

Now some time into their prison sentence, the Dwarfers have been put on probation for good behaviour. Arnold Rimmer (Chris Barrie) is attending to Captain Hollister (Mac McDonald) as he recovers from yellow fever. Hollister notices that Rimmer has tried to slip in a form pardoning him from all crimes. Rimmer explains his ambition to become an officer someday, perhaps even a captain. Hollister tells him he is not officer material and dismisses him as Talia (Heidi Monsen) enters. It seems that the Captain and Talia know each other from the past. Rimmer, disgusted at the Captain's success with women and his own failure in that regard, leaves. In the corridor he attempts to steal some chocolate from the vending machine, only for the AI of the machine to promise revenge. Rimmer tells the machine that the day that happens he'll be captain of the ship.

Later, Lister (Craig Charles) and Rimmer discover that Kryten (Robert Llewellyn), in an act of revenge, has hidden illegal moonshine belonging to fellow prisoner Baxter (Ricky Grover) in their cell, just after Holly (Norman Lovett) informs them of a cell inspection. Knowing that being caught with it will cost them probation, and with the water tank full the two have no choice but to drink the hooch. As a result, both are drunk when Warden Ackerman (Graham McTavish) arrives for the inspection. When Baxter finds out, believing his hooch was stolen by Rimmer and Lister, he threatens to finish off the two, now in sickbay, sleeping off the stomach pump. The two decide they need to escape. Kryten and Kochanski (Chloë Annett) pretend to be ill to land in sickbay, while the Cat (Danny John-Jules) is forced to disguise himself as a nurse after his attempts to get beaten up only result in the toughest prisoner in The Tank offering to be his bitch. As the Dwarfers escape they find that the microbe from the Hermes is now eating away at Red Dwarf. They decide to tell Hollister (against Rimmer's advice), who then announces that Red Dwarf will be abandoned—however, due to a shortage of escape craft, the prisoners will be left behind to die.

Now that the Dwarfers have the run of the ship, Kryten and Kochanski devise a plan which involves entering a mirror universe where everything is opposite; negative becomes positive and a virus becomes an antidote. Kryten builds a prism laser and directs it at a mirror to create a dimensional gateway. Rimmer crosses over with a sample of the virus, only for the device to break and trap him in the mirror universe. He realises he is not a failure in this universe but is instead Captain, and berates the alternative Hollister, now a 2nd Technician, for being useless. When Talia comes in, Rimmer, thinking she is his lover, snogs her, only to be told she is Sister Talia, his spiritual advisor. Rimmer quickly goes to the science lab to talk to the professor, the alternative Cat, who knows the formula for the antidote (Cesiumfrancolithicmyxialobidiumrixydixydoxidexidroxhide). Given the complicated name, Rimmer asks for it to be written down.

Rimmer triumphantly returns to his universe with the formula written down only to find Red Dwarf a flaming inferno falling apart with the others gone. The dispensing machine tells him that the other Dwarfers had repaired the prism and followed him into the mirror universe and Rimmer is now the ship's Captain since he's now the only crew member remaining. Rimmer tries to return to the mirror universe, but the microbe has destroyed the laser. Believing it to be his only hope, he prepares to create the antidote but the dispensing machine points out that the formula he has written down is now the formula for the virus, having reverted into its mirror opposite. After exchanging insults, the machine (Tony Slattery) finally gets its own back on Rimmer by launching a can at his head and hitting him, knocking him to the ground and causing the now useless slip of paper containing the formula to burn up from the surrounding flames.

The episode ends with the Grim Reaper (played by series director Ed Bye) coming to claim Rimmer as Adagio for Strings plays in the background. Rimmer kicks Death in the crotch and runs off down the flaming corridor, claiming that "only the good die young" as Death winces "That's never happened before ..." The episode ends with an ominous "The End" caption, but is soon refuted with its sudden erasure and replacement with a defiant "THE SMEG IT IS".

== Production ==
This episode had a notorious production, going through numerous re-writes and re-shoots. The original climax, titled "Earth", was to have the Red Dwarf crew arrive back at Earth only for the ship to accidentally crash through the world's major landmarks. This was deemed too expensive to film, so an altogether different finale was written. Naylor would blame the expensive CGI dinosaur from "Pete" as the cause of the lack-of-budget for "Earth". One proposed ending was to feature Arnold Rimmer's dashing and heroic alter-ego Ace Rimmer returning to save the day (in reality, the 'original' Arnold Rimmer). However this ending was not filmed. This, too, was changed at the last moment and the character of Death itself was introduced.

The conclusion of this episode was a cliffhanger, although the ending of this last episode is open to interpretation. In 2009, ten years after the original broadcast of "Only the Good..."', a new special, Back to Earth, was broadcast by channel Dave. The events of "Only the Good..." are never referred to throughout the episode. It is not revealed what happened to Lister, Cat, Kryten and Kochanski once they crossed over into the mirror universe, or how or indeed if Rimmer escaped the decaying Red Dwarf – however, Rimmer is once again a hologram. The events are referred to at the end of the last episode of Series X, "The Beginning"; however, Rimmer is interrupted before exact details are given.

Tony Slattery – who had played an android in the soap Androids featured ten years previously in "Kryten" – took on Rimmer as the voice of the vending machine, sitting behind the unit and speaking his lines live on set. Other guest stars included Mac McDonald as Captain Hollister, Graham McTavish as Governor Ackerman, Heidi Monsen as Talia, Ricky Grover as Baxter and David Verrey as Big Meat.

=== Alternative filmed ending ===
Rimmer salutes from the porthole of the captain's former quarters, ordering Kryten to go "full ahead"

An alternative ending where the Dwarfers clearly survive, and indeed even find themselves in a similar situation to the earlier series of Red Dwarf, was scripted and filmed but cut at the last minute. However, it is available for viewing on the series VIII DVD special features.

In this version of the episode, Rimmer successfully remembers the antidote to the microbe that is eating the ship. It takes him over two hours to memorise the name of the antidote, as he has to alternate between the mirror universe and back to read the name of the antidote (which becomes the chemical name of the microbe in our universe as the opposite of the antidote). However, Rimmer memorises the antidote just in time for Kryten to make up some of the chemical antidote and use it to destroy the microbe, ironic as everyone else already knew its name as common knowledge or from foundational chemistry lessons.

Red Dwarf having been saved from destruction, Rimmer takes up residence in the captain's quarters. Lister, Cat, and Kochanski party and celebrate at having survived, being no longer imprisoned in The Tank and once again having free run of the vessel. Kryten resumes his ironing duties.

Meanwhile, the rest of the Red Dwarf crew—Captain Frank Hollister and the rest of the flight officers—look on Red Dwarf helplessly from their fleet of Starbugs and Blue Midgets with which they escaped the disintegrating mothership. Kryten peeks through a porthole at the fleet and asks Rimmer if they should perhaps slow down Red Dwarf so that the rest of the crew can dock in the hangar bay and come aboard. Rimmer, reminiscent of Horatio Nelson at the Battle of Copenhagen in 1801 (in accordance with his military fantasies), replies 'Full ahead, Mr. Kryten, I see no ships!', sardonically saluting Hollister from afar.

The alternative ending concludes with Rimmer paying the money he owes to the dispensing machine he stole from earlier. However, the machine still fires a can at Rimmer's head, knocking him unconscious.

== Reception ==
Sophie Davis of CultBox said in 2018 that it "is certainly an improvement on Pete but serves as an unsatisfying finale overall", ending "The idea of an alternative reality where Rimmer is the ship’s captain, Cat is a professor and so on is an interesting one, but it comes into play so late in the episode that we barely get any time to explore it at all." Tom Salinsky wrote in his 2025 book that the "hooch-drinkning scene [...] is very funny, but like so much else in this episode, and this series, it goes nowhere. I'm extremely glad the story of Red Dwarf doesn't end here, because this last BBC year is a rough ride."
