= Back in the Red =

- Red Dwarf episodes
- Episode nos.: Series 8 Episodes 1 – 3
- Directed by: Ed Bye
- Written by: Doug Naylor
- Original air dates: 18 February 1999; 25 February 1999; 4 March 1999

Guest appearances
- Mac McDonald as Captain Hollister; Paul Bradley as Chen; David Gillespie as Selby; Karl Glenn Stimpson as MP Thornton; Kika Mirylees as Doc Newton; Andy Taylor as Dr McClaren; Jemma Churchill as Panel Woman Officer; Sue Kelvin as Second Woman Officer; Genevieve Swallow as Last Woman Officer; Geoffrey Beevers as Doctor; Graham McTavish as Warden Ackerman; Yasmin Bannerman as First Ground Controller; Jeillo Edwards as Second Ground Controller

Episode chronology
← Previous "Nanarchy"	Next → "Cassandra"
- Red Dwarf VIII

"Back in the Red" is the opening three-part episode of series VIII of science fiction sit-com Red Dwarf. Part 1 was first broadcast on the British television channel BBC2 on 18 February 1999 followed by Part 2 on 25 February and Part 3 on 4 March.

The plot involves the re-introduction of Red Dwarf, as nanobots have rebuilt the ship and the original crew are resurrected. The three episodes were written by Doug Naylor and directed by Ed Bye.

== Plot ==
=== Part 1 ===
In a prison cell, Lister (Craig Charles) and Rimmer (Chris Barrie) are having another furious argument. We are then shown the circumstances that led to their incarceration.

Three days earlier, nanobots from Kryten (Robert Llewellyn) had rebuilt Red Dwarf, but at too large a scale (Note: As depicted in Nanarchy.). Lister enters the cockpit, showing off his now non-muscular body, and it emerges that the enlargement is a temporary symptom of the nanobots' restoration process, as it soon turns out that Red Dwarf is shrinking around Starbug. Suddenly, the ship is sucked into an air vent. With Red Dwarf almost completely shrunk, the corridors rip off the rear and middle section of Starbug before the cockpit is sent flying into a cargo bay where it crash-lands, and the crew manage to escape mere seconds before it explodes.

The crew are approached by two figures recognized by two of Lister's old friends, Selby (David Gillespie) and Chen (Paul Bradley): the nanobots have not only restored Red Dwarf but also its crew. Captain Hollister (Mac McDonald) then arrives with a Security Officer, who places Lister under arrest for stealing and crashing a Starbug, flying without a pilot's license and bringing two stowaways - The Cat (Danny John-Jules) and Kryten (Robert Llewellyn) - aboard. Everyone is placed in custody and Lister is confined to quarters. A version of Holly (Norman Lovett) on Lister's watch explains that, if found guilty, they will get two years in "The Tank", a hidden top-secret prison facility on the ship, holding hundreds of inmates who were being transported to a containment facility. Unfortunately, they have all been resurrected too.

At his quarters, Lister meets a nano-restored Rimmer. Lister tells Rimmer the whole story and asks for help in escaping, so he can recover the nanobots in time before his trial. In exchange, he offers Rimmer a way to get the promotion to officer status like he has always wanted. Rimmer agrees and Lister lends him his Holly watch, and sends him to Starbug to recover confidential files of the crew.

The Cat and Kryten are taken for medical and psychiatric evaluation. Unfortunately, Kryten's erratic personality does not go over well, and he is recommended to be restored to his factory settings.

Aboard the burnt out wreckage of the cockpit of Starbug, Rimmer finds the disc with the crew's files. He also finds the positive viruses recovered from Dr. Lanstrom (Note: As depicted in Quarantine.). Rimmer quickly tries out sexual magnetism, and walks down the corridor where all the women admire him. Rimmer notes to himself that 'the world loves a bastard'.

=== Part 2 ===
Lister, Kochanski (Chloë Annett), Kryten and The Cat are brought before a board of enquiry, and Captain Hollister has them consent to use psychotropic testing during their trial. Later, Kryten is taken away for a physical examination and, due to his lack of a penis, is classified as a woman. They also offer Kryten a deal: if he agrees to undergo a system restoration, then the charges against him will be dropped. Kryten does not want to say yes, but cannot say no to superior officers. Despite acting on Kochanski's advice in his efforts to refuse the reset, the crew to decide to proceed anyway. Afterwards, Kryten has been returned to his old ways of servitude and politeness.

Later, Rimmer visits Captain Hollister with a report detailing the dangers of loose drive plates. Hollister is impressed by the in-depth report, and Rimmer (using information from the confidential reports) continues by giving Hollister a blueberry muffin as an anniversary present and some pile cream. Hollister invites Rimmer to dinner at the Captain's Table that evening. Pleased with the success of his scheme, Rimmer goes back on his deal with Lister, having no more need for the files in favor of the positive viruses. However, Lister has managed to expose himself to the viruses when Rimmer shows them to him, and escapes his cell by guessing the right code with the luck virus.

Lister breaks Kochanski out of her quarters and, while in a lift, decides to make the most of the opportunity to try out the sexual magnetism virus on himself. Although it works at first and Kochanski practically throws herself at her former boyfriend, she returns to normal after a few seconds and Lister realizes that the two positive viruses cancel each other out. Later, after rescuing The Cat, the three disguise themselves as computer programmers to evade detection while they rescue Kryten and re-break his programming.

Meanwhile, at dinner, Rimmer has taken the sexual magnetism virus in a very large dose and charms everyone, but becomes exhausted when female officers keep following him into the supply closet to have sex with him. Hollister discusses the psychotropic testing he is conducting on the others and reveals that they have been secretly placed in an artificial reality simulation where their actions are being monitored: the aforementioned trial. Rimmer fears that Lister could jeopardize his future by mentioning the deal, and leaves for the AR suite. On his journey, he tries to cancel out the sexual magnetism virus by injecting anesthetic into his groin. However, it spreads to his left leg, and he is forced to hobble to the Artificial Reality suite while the female crew still admire him.

=== Part 3 ===
In the simulation, Lister, Kryten, Kochanski and The Cat arrive in a hangar and steal a Blue Midget to search for Kryten's nanobots to corroborate their story. Rimmer infiltrates the AR suite in time to overhear Lister mentioning his failed deal with Rimmer. Rimmer prompts the computer to remove all mention of his name and the deal. The crew, however, notice jump cuts in their actions and conversation, and realize where they really are and what's going on. They find an emergency exit in the simulation, and awake in the AR suite to confront Rimmer, using the luck virus to save Rimmer from being hit on by Kochanski.

Rimmer joins the crew as they try again with their escape attempt. While making plans to pick up supplies from the SS Einstein, talk turns to the Theory of relativity. Naturally, Holly is unable to recall what it actually means, but takes offense at being labelled an idiot and reveals that he created the nanobots that resurrected the crew, as part of his ongoing mission to keep Lister sane. Holly also reveals that they (Rimmer included) are still in a simulation, having been outsmarted by a second, nano-restored Holly.

From his office, Captain Hollister observes the simulation and discusses the events with the second Holly. The two accept Lister's nanobot story and declare the group innocent. However, the captain adds their actions also confirm their use of confidential information for their own gain, having grown suspicious of Rimmer's sudden intelligence. Of this, everyone is found guilty and are sentenced to two years in The Tank. Hollister releases the crew from the simulation and confiscates the luck virus. As they are photographed in their prison uniforms, Holly realizes that he has screwed up again.

Below, the crew are welcomed by Warden Ackerman (Graham McTavish) to "The Tank". In a final act of revenge, Lister exposes Rimmer to the last of the sexual magnetism virus. Rimmer then realizes that he has become very popular with the male inmates.

== Production ==
The story was originally as a two-parter but ran long and additional material was written in order to turn it into a three-part episode. A special edition forming one single presentation of 80 minutes was part of the home video release.

== Reception ==
Sophie Davies, writing in 2018 for CultBox, said it "feels rather messy and confused, taking several strange turns along the way", and noted that "Red Dwarf has always been a rather broad comedy, despite its sci-fi setting, but series VIII has significantly more juvenile humour than before." Tom Salinsky said in his 2025 book about the show that the opening scene with Rimmer and Lister "doesn't quite have the old magic, but it is a pleasure to see the dynamic return", and that "the first two parts were struggling to recapture the show's glory days. Part Three feels like surrender."
