= Cassandra (Red Dwarf) =

- Red Dwarf episode
- Episode no.: Series 8 Episode 4
- Directed by: Ed Bye
- Written by: Doug Naylor
- Original air dates: 7 March 1999 (US); 11 March 1999 (UK)

Guest appearances
- Mac McDonald as Captain Hollister; Graham McTavish as Warden Ackerman; Geraldine McEwan as Cassandra; Jake Wood as Kill Crazy; Ian Shend as Warden Knot; Ian Soundy as Guard; Joseph Crilly as Blood Drinker

Episode chronology
| ← Previous "Back in the Red" | Next → "Krytie TV" |
- Red Dwarf VIII

"Cassandra" is the fourth episode of Red Dwarf VIII and the 48th in the series run. It was first shown in the UK on 11 March 1999 in the 9:00pm BBC2 time slot, Written by Doug Naylor and directed by Ed Bye.

== Synopsis ==
Following advice from Holly (Norman Lovett), Lister (Craig Charles) signs up for "the Canaries". However, he soon discovers there are two problems: first; they are a group of expendables who go first into dangerous situations and not, as he believed, the prison choir, and secondly; he's signed the whole gang up by forging their signatures. At the last minute, Rimmer (Chris Barrie), Lister, Kryten (Robert Llewellyn), Kochanski (Chloë Annett) and the Cat (Danny John-Jules) try to get themselves released from the Canaries on the grounds of Lister's misunderstanding by singing You Are the Sunshine of My Life at Canary initiation, though this fails. Their first mission is aboard the sunken wreck of the SSS Silverberg, a prison ship for its sole occupant, Cassandra (Geraldine McEwan), a computer who can predict the future with 100% accuracy, and she predicts Rimmer is soon to die.

Cassandra claims that only Lister, Kryten, Kochanski and the Cat will make it out alive and that all the other prisoners will die (although Rimmer will die first). Though told it is impossible to prevent Cassandra's prediction from coming true Rimmer comes up with a plan. He realises that no one ever referred to him as Rimmer in front of Cassandra and since she does not know everything she may believe someone else is Rimmer and have predicted that that other person will die first. He manages to ruin Knot's jacket and gives him his own with his name tag on it as a replacement, insisting that Knot call him any number of insulting names but not "Rimmer". When Cassandra sees Knot die of a heart attack (caused by learning that he would die of a heart attack) she of course believes him to be named Rimmer so her prediction comes true. The real Rimmer is prepared to celebrate until she points out he's still going to die. He questions how it happens and she claims that Lister kills him after finding him in bed with Kochanski. Rimmer is quite happy about the concept, Kochanski is not. She believes that even if she were blind drunk, that would not excuse her other senses. Rimmer still tries to persuade her, but she disagrees. He then accidentally soaks Kochanski with water, forcing her to take her clothes off and lie on the bed he has prepared.

Very much to his annoyance, before Rimmer can have sex with Kochanski, he is interrupted by Lister. Kryten has figured out that Cassandra must have known her whole life how and when she was going to die and furthermore that Lister was the one who kills her. She lied about Rimmer and Kochanski as a means to punish Lister for what he would do. Lister then goes back to Cassandra's chamber, telling her that he does not like the idea that his entire future is already picked out, and plans to prove he can make his own decisions by refusing to kill her. As he exits, he takes chewing gum out of his mouth and idly sticks it to the wall. It lands on the fan, turning it on, and ricochets to a glass of scotch; the scotch spills and lands on Cassandra's power wire, inadvertently killing her. Seeing Cassandra's annoyed (and knowing) look, Lister realises what he has done, and leaves, cursing "Smeg!"

== Production ==
"Cassandra" was the first episode to be seen by US audiences before being broadcast in the UK. Some PBS stations were broadcasting the entire series in the United States, even showing the last five episodes before the BBC broadcast, "Cassandra" being the first of the five.

Doug Naylor claimed this episode was to play into the fans' beliefs that Rimmer was going to die and come back as a hologram.

Mac McDonald appeared as Captain Hollister, Graham McTavish as Governor Ackerman, Geraldine McEwan as Cassandra, Jake Wood as Kill Crazy, Ian Soundy as Guard.

== Reception ==
Reviewing the VHS release in 2000 for TV Zone, Rob Morris wrote that the episode and the succeeding one were the "freshest Dwarfs in a long time".

Writing in 2017 for CultBox, Sophie Davies said that the episode is "by far the best episode of series VIII, with a comparatively tight plot that focuses on our core group of characters without any of the wacky supporting characters getting too much in the way." Tom Salinsky's 2025 book said "We're quite far off the show's glory days here, but this is never boring, frequently, and generally makes some sort of sense. I'll take that."

== Cultural references ==
In the DVD commentary to this episode, Danny John-Jules claims the name and appearance of Cassandra were homaged in the "Doctor Who" episode "The End of the World", as a joke.

Cassandra herself is named after the figure from Greek mythology who could see the future and predicted her own death.
