= Krytie TV =

- Red Dwarf episode
- Episode no.: Series 8 Episode 5
- Directed by: Ed Bye
- Written by: Doug Naylor; Paul Alexander
- Original air dates: 7 March 1999 (US); 18 March 1999 (UK)

Guest appearances
- Graham McTavish as Warden Ackerman; Jake Wood as Kill Crazy; Mark Caven as Man in Film; Sarah Wateridge as Woman in Film; Clifford Barry as Guard

Episode chronology
← Previous "Cassandra"	Next → "Pete"
- Red Dwarf VIII

"Krytie TV" is the fifth episode of Red Dwarf VIII and the 49th in the series run. It was first shown in the UK on 18 March 1999 in the 9:00pm BBC2 time slot, and was written by Doug Naylor and Paul Alexander and directed by Ed Bye.

== Synopsis ==
Lister (Craig Charles) gets a letter from Petersen containing some news: his guitar has been found in Starbug's wreckage and is being sent on to him. However, Lister's happiness and Rimmer's despair are soon quashed as the guitar arrives without the strings due to the regulation preventing prisoners from possessing anything they can hang themselves with (which, for Rimmer (Chris Barrie), would be a very real consideration if Lister was playing his guitar). Lister also gets a letter notifying him that he has the right to appeal which, if successful, will apply to all other prisoners in his situation. Rimmer is overjoyed that he may soon be released, even snitching on fellow inmates who stole Ackerman's glass eye.

Kryten (Robert Llewellyn) reveals that he showers with the female inmates (having been classed as a woman when he arrived on Red Dwarf due to his lack of external genitals). He is knocked out and reprogrammed by the less scrupulous members of the Tank and duly starts up his own pay-TV venture, Krytie TV. Meanwhile, Lister and Rimmer are watching a trailer for Attack of the Giant Savage Completely Invisible Aliens (from the makers of Vampire Bikini Girls Suck Paris) when Krytie TV takes over programming and shows 'Women's Shower Night', featuring none other than Kristine Kochanski (Chloë Annett). Lister and Rimmer both intend to leave, not wanting to risk the appeal, but then decide to stay for a while.

Kochanski and the other girls soon find out what has happened. Kryten later turns up at Lister and Rimmer's cell claiming to have had his system repaired, gotten kicked out by the girls and being reclassified as a man. He then tells Lister that Kochanski is being allowed out so she can go on a date with her ex-boyfriend. Kryten offers to help Lister trash his quarters, however Dave soon finds he has trashed Warden Ackerman's quarters, who is on his way back with his own date for the evening. In reality, Kryten hadn't had his system repaired nor had he been kicked out by the girls ... all this is being shown on Krytie TV. With the appeal on the line Lister, with Rimmer's help, rushes to fix the room up before Ackerman returns. That edition ends with Lister and Rimmer chasing Kryten down a corridor, despite Kryten's pleas that he was only trying to boost the ratings and it was 'nothing personal!'.

A couple of days later, Lister receives a letter informing him his appeal was successful but Rimmer finds out the appeal wasn't against their sentence: it was actually to allow Lister to have his guitar strings. Rimmer is devastated that after all his effort all he's managed to do is get Lister's guitar back, especially when Lister offers to write him a song.

== Production ==
Originally titled "No Strings Attached" and revolving around Lister's guitar strings, this was later changed to "Krytie TV". The episode turned out to be a problematic production.

Chloë Annett fell ill during the making of the episode and the scene scheduling had to be re-organised. With minor adjustments, the episode was completed.

Guest stars included Graham McTavish as Governor Ackerman, Jake Wood as Kill Crazy, Mark Caven as Man in Film, Sarah Wateridge as Woman in Film, Clifford Barry as Guard.

== Reception ==
Reviewing the VHS release in 2000 for TV Zone, Rob Morris wrote that the episode and the preceding one were the "freshest Dwarfs in a long time".

Tom Salinsky wrote in his 2025 book that it "leaves a bad taste in my mouth", and that "The big problem here is [...] that this sophisticated high-concept science fiction comedy show is suddenly relying on voyeurism for most of its laughs." Sophie Davis of CultBox said in 2018 that "it's very difficult to get past the unpleasant, laddish premise. It's also difficult to not come away thinking less of Lister, who claims to be in love with Kochanski but doesn't show any signs of respecting her as a person at all."
