= Kryten =

Fictional character in Red Dwarf

- Red Dwarf character
- First appearance: "Kryten"; 6 September 1988
- Portrayed by: David Ross (Series II); Robert Llewellyn (Series III–The Promised Land)

In-universe information
- Full name: Kryten 2X4B-523P
- Occupation: Service mechanoid

Kryten is a fictional character in the British science fiction situation comedy Red Dwarf. The name Kryten is a reference to the head butler in the J.M. Barrie play The Admirable Crichton. Originally referred to as a Series III mechanoid, he is later described as a 4000 Series, or Series 4000.

In their original plan for the series, Rob Grant and Doug Naylor had specified that there would be no aliens and no robots. Following the success of the first appearance by the Kryten character, Naylor convinced Grant to bring him back.

In the character's first appearance, originally only intended as a one-off, Kryten was played by actor David Ross but the popularity of the character meant that Kryten was introduced as a regular in Series III. The intention was to bring Ross back to play the role, but he was not available at the time and the position was filled by actor Robert Llewellyn.

David Ross later returned to voice Talkie Toaster in the series IV episode "White Hole" and the series XII episode "Mechocracy".

== Fictional history ==
=== Television ===
==== 1980s ====
Kryten was portrayed by David Ross in his debut appearance.

Kryten (as portrayed by David Ross) first appeared in the Red Dwarf episode "Kryten" (1988), where he is characterised as a service mechanoid on board the Nova 5, a spacecraft originally from Earth. Kryten says that his entire purpose is "to serve and have no regard for himself". He sends a distress call which is picked up by the crew of the mining ship Red Dwarf, claiming that the male crew died when the Nova 5 crash landed on a planetoid, while the female crew are—according to Kryten himself—"stable, but injured". The female crew have actually been dead for "centuries"—Kryten apparently not realising this, and continuing to feed and serve them. Because there is no-one else on board the Nova 5, Kryten starts a new life on Red Dwarf with the hologram Arnold Rimmer (Chris Barrie) as his new master. Dave Lister (Craig Charles) persuades Kryten to rebel against Rimmer (which includes showing him the films Rebel Without a Cause and Easy Rider) and to become independent. Kryten changes the portrait of Rimmer he paints to make it appear as though he was sitting on a toilet, and then pours soup onto Rimmer's bed sheets. Kryten takes Lister's space-bike and goes out to find a planet with an atmosphere where he can grow a garden, which had always been a dream of his. This episode also marks a 'first' in science-fiction history in which an android deliberately gives a human being the 'finger'.

Kryten (as portrayed by Robert Llewellyn) returns in "Backwards" (1989), where he permanently becomes part of the Red Dwarf crew. At the start of the episode, Kryten is described in some scrolling text as being found in pieces after his space-bike crashed on an asteroid. Lister rebuilds Kryten, although he is unable to recapture his former personality. In the episode proper, Kryten causes the Starbug 1 shuttle to fall into a time hole while taking a driving test facilitated by Rimmer. The ship crash lands on Earth in a reality where time runs backwards, leaving Kryten, Rimmer and Red Dwarf's computer Holly (Hattie Hayridge) stranded. Rimmer and Kryten spend three weeks working as the novelty act "the Sensational Reverse Brothers" and begin to enjoy life in this new reality, but are fired by a pub manager (Arthur Smith) for a fight that Rimmer and Kryten become involved in later that night. Lister and the Cat (Danny John-Jules) come to rescue Rimmer, Kryten and Holly in another Starbug to get back to Red Dwarf.

In "Timeslides" (1989), Lister is seen travelling back in time by entering a photographic slide with mutated developing fluid to convince his younger self (played by Emile Charles) to become wealthy and successful and not join the Space Corps. This consequently causes Kryten to never be rescued. Rimmer unwittingly reverses this new timeline by going back in time to his boyhood self (played by Simon Gaffney), causing Kryten to return to Red Dwarf.

In "The Last Day" (1989), a replacement android for Kryten is shown travelling en route to Red Dwarf, and a countdown for Kryten's shut down disc activates, leaving Kryten with only twenty-four hours notice before all mental and physical action automatically stops, because of his service life expiring so the new model can be sold. Kryten reveals that he has a strong faith in Silicon Heaven, an afterlife for electrical equipment, which Lister tries and fails to convince Kryten is not real. After feeling enjoyment for the first time at a party, Kryten overrides his shut down programming and causes his replacement, Hudzen (Gordon Kennedy), to shut down (preventing him from deactivating Kryten by force) because Hudzen's android brain is unable to cope with the idea there is no Silicon Heaven; Kryten only surviving because he knew he was lying to Hudzen.

==== 1990s ====
In "Camille" (1991), Lister is shown trying to teach Kryten how to lie, cheat and be offensive as part of a way to make Kryten break his programming and become independent. After Kryten dates and falls in love with a pleasure GELF called Camille (Judy Pascoe)—firstly in the form of a 4000 Series GTI mechanoid, and later her original amorphous blob form—Camille's estranged husband Hector (Rupert Bates), who like Camille is also a blob, lands in Red Dwarf's hangar to take her back and find an antidote for their condition. Kryten lies to Camille to protect her feelings and give her her best shot at happiness by convincing her to go with Hector.

In the episode "DNA" (1991), Kryten is briefly transformed into a human being (played by Llewellyn, minus his usual make-up) when the DNA from his part organic brain is used to alter Kryten's entire molecular structure. He quickly decides to change himself back into mechanoid form, because he feels miserable about making fun of Kryten's spare heads (all played by Llewellyn), the ones Kryten describe as those closest to him, and because being a mechanoid is what he "always ha[s] been" and "always will be".

In "The Inquisitor" (1992), Kryten is put on trial by the legendary android known as the Inquisitor (John Docherty) to determine whether or not his existence is justified or a waste. After Kryten is found unworthy of existence, the memory of Kryten is erased, and the Inquisitor replaces Kryten's life with that of an alternative, uncredited Kryten who never got a chance at life. This alternative Kryten is killed by the Inquisitor, while Lister subsequently tricks the Inquisitor into erasing himself from existence, causing the memory of Kryten to be restored.

In "Demons and Angels" (1992), Red Dwarf is blown up when the beam of a device called the triplicator is put into reverse, putting the engine core into meltdown, while creating a "high" and "low" version of Red Dwarf, complete with their own versions of Kryten (both played by Llewellyn). Before the lifespans of both versions of Red Dwarf expire after an hour, the crew collect pieces of the triplicator from both Red Dwarfs, and restore the original Red Dwarf by amalgamating the two copies with a rebuilt triplicator. The "high" version of Kryten is blown up by a bomb the "lows" throw at him, while the "low" version disappears with his version of Red Dwarf.

In "Back to Reality" (1992), ink from a "despair squid" causes Lister, Rimmer, the Cat and Kryten to share a hallucination, with the hallucinations attacking things they each consider "quintessential to [their] self-esteem". In the hallucination, Kryten believes he is a half-human android traffic control officer called Jake Bullet, and while hallucinating, appears to kill a man (Lenny Von Dohlen), going against what Kryten believes is fundamental to him – "never to take a life". The four nearly commit suicide together, but a mood stabiliser saves them at the last second.

According to backstory in "Psirens" (1993), Kryten's creator is Professor Mamet. According to a "Psiren" duplicate of Mamet (portrayed by Jenny Agutter), Kryten is coded not to harm Mamet, and to obey her every command. In the episode, Kryten explains that Red Dwarf was "stolen", with the crew now based inside Starbug chasing after Red Dwarf to recover it.

In "Out of Time" (1993), Rimmer mentions that all trace of Red Dwarf has been lost. In the episode, a Starbug from fifteen years hence arrives, with Lister, Rimmer, Cat and Kryten's future selves intending to copy some components from the present Starbug's time drive so they can fix the fault in their own drive and continue their lives of opulence, socialising with notorious figures of history such as the Habsburgs, the Borgias, Louis XVI, Adolf Hitler and Hermann Göring. Lister tells the future crew to leave, and the future Starbug fires upon the present day one, apparently killing the crew and blowing Starbug up.

In the following episode, "Tikka to Ride" (1997), Lister mentions in a video log that the future Starbug destroying the Starbug of the present meant the time drive they had used ceased to exist in both the present and the future, or in other words, killing the present crew of Starbug in the present also killed the crew in the future, making it impossible for the future crew from ever going back in time to kill themselves in the present. The Cat later mentions in the episode that time returned to the point before the time drive was discovered. When Starbug's supplies of curry and lager are destroyed, Lister replaces Kryten's main head with one of his spares and removes his guilt chip in a bid to use the time drive to restore them (after Kryten, Cat and Rimmer refused). The newly uninhibited Kryten showed no concern about using profanity, serving the crew unhealthy meals, the damaging repercussions of the crew's accidental prevention of John F. Kennedy's assassination, or serving human flesh for Lister and Cat to eat.

According to Lister in "Ouroboros" (1997), Kryten ended up alone aboard the Nova 5 because he killed the crew in an accident, and prior to that on the SS Augustus, that ship's crew had all died of old age. In the episode, a Kryten from a parallel dimension (played by Llewellyn) is briefly seen, when a "linkway" through "non-space" is opened when the membrane between the two realities temporarily collapses. The alternate version of Kryten has gold casing.

In "Beyond a Joke" (1997), a rogue simulant (Don Henderson) gives Kryten access to a file in his CPU which Kryten had never been able to access before. According to this file, Professor Mamet was due to marry a fellow bio-engineer, John Warburton. When Warburton jilted Mamet the day before their wedding, as an act of revenge, Mamet created the 4000 Series of droids in his image. As part of the joke, all of Kryten's negative emotions are stored in a file: Kryten's "nega drive". When this file gets full, it blows, just like Warburton used to.

In "Epideme" (1997), Kryten mentions completing his Bachelor of Sanitation course at "toilet university" many years prior, where he studied the "lavatorial sciences". Navigation Officer Kristine Kochanski (Chloë Annett) retorts that "toilet university" is simply a piece of software installed in Kryten, although he states that he still needed to sit a written exam to prove that it was properly installed. Lister has his right arm amputated in an attempt to rid his body of the Epideme virus (voiced by Gary Martin). Kochanski ultimately gets rid of the virus by temporarily stopping Lister's heart and containing the virus in deceased Red Dwarf crewmember Caroline Carmen's (Nicky Leatherbarrow) arm, injected with blood and adrenaline, and tricking the virus into thinking the arm belongs to Kochanski. In the following episode, "Nanarchy" (1997), Kryten tries looking for his self-repairing nanobots to rebuild Lister's arm. Returning to the part of space where they were last seen, the crew discovers Red Dwarf has been converted by the nanobots into a planetoid made of sand and Holly restored to his old settings (played by Norman Lovett) and abandoned there, with the Red Dwarf Starbug spent years chasing after being a subatomic version shrunken down and eventually exploring Lister's laundry basket, and the remaining bits they did not want being left on the planetoid. Kryten orders the nanobots to rebuild Lister's arm and turn the planetoid back into Red Dwarf.

In Back in the Red (1999), Holly creates a new set of nanobots to bring the entire crew on board Red Dwarf back to life after Kryten's had gone missing again. Included among the resurrected crew is Rimmer, after the hologrammatic simulation of Rimmer left Starbug. Lister, Rimmer, Cat, Kryten and Kochanski are sentenced to two years in the ship's brig for misuse of confidential information. While on trial for unrelated crimes against the Space Corps, Kryten is also classified as a woman under Space Corps directives, because he does not have a penis. In "Cassandra" (1999), the five of them get signed up by Lister to the convict army the Canaries after Holly lies to Lister that they're a singing troupe.

In "Krytie TV" (1999), the prisoner Kill Crazy (Jake Wood) reprograms Kryten. After his reprogramming, Kryten turns into a "ruthless entrepreneur" that runs a pay TV service in the prisoners' cinema called Krytie TV, making him rich, feared and respected from hidden camera programming.

In Pete Part Two (1999), Kryten feels humiliated about being classified as a woman and being posted to the women's wing of the brig due to him being "genitally challenged". To rectify this, he creates a penis he calls "Archie" out of an old electron board, toilet roll, sticky-back plastic and an Action Man's polo neck. Archie, however, subsequently escapes Kryten and Kochanski's cell and runs amok in the prison.

In "Only the Good..." (1999), a corrosive micro-organism is shown eating apart Red Dwarf. After Rimmer tries and fails to obtain the formula for an antidote from a "mirror universe" where everything is opposite, and not being able to find anyone on Red Dwarf upon returning, a vending machine (voiced by Tony Slattery) informs Rimmer that everyone crossed back into the mirror universe. The machine opening the way to the mirror universe is shown to have been destroyed by the micro-organism, leaving Rimmer stranded and the only crew member aboard Red Dwarf in his universe.

==== 2000s ====
In Red Dwarf: Back to Earth (2009), set nine years later, Red Dwarf is intact; the human race is apparently "virtually extinct" in the universe apart from Lister again; Lister, Rimmer, the Cat and Kryten are the only people on board the ship; and Rimmer is shown to be a hard light hologram and the most senior officer on board again; how these have come about and what happened to the micro-organism is not explained. In this special, a female "despair squid", whose ink causes joy and elation instead of despair to defend herself, causes Lister, Rimmer, the Cat and Kryten to share a hallucination where they believe they are fictional characters from a TV series called Red Dwarf, and their dimension is "invalid". This leads them to be shown being pulled into the nearest "valid" reality. They confront the "Creator" of Red Dwarf (Richard O'Callaghan) on a version of 21st century Earth who is ready to kill off the characters, and Lister accidentally kills him. The four subconsciously realise that they're hallucinating, and they wake up on board Red Dwarf. Kryten and Rimmer speculate that they were able to choose whether or not they wanted to wake up because of the strengthened antibodies of the four from the previous encounter with the despair squid. Lister initially believes that Kochanski is dead as well, but two children in the hallucination (played by Charlie Kenyon and Nina Southworth) inform that Kryten lied to him, and she actually left him after taking a Blue Midget shuttle. Kryten later confirms this.

==== 2010s ====
In "Krysis" (2016), Kryten begins suffering from a mid-life crisis on the 2,976,000th anniversary of his creation. He loses interest in the things he normally enjoys and subsequently installs a bright red "pimptactular" carbon-fibre shell to his body in order to recapture his youth and gains a sudden attraction to bungie jumping. Butler (Dominic Coleman), an earlier model of mechanoid that achieved far more than Kryten, deliberately sabotages Starbug to allow Kryten to meet the Universe (voice of Daniel Barker) so Kryten can feel better about himself. The Universe also tells Kryten to remove his new suit because it "really sucks".

In "Siliconia" (2017), Kryten and the crew encounter the Mechanoid Intergalactic Liberation Front (MILFs), who seek to liberate Kryten from his station as a mere mechanoid where he is programmed to serve Lister, Rimmer and Cat aboard Red Dwarf. Kryten, for a time, begins to resent the crew for the way they treated him and is close to fully becoming a MILF himself, but reneges after discovering they've converted the others into mechanoids, slowly draining them of their former personalities, and enslaved other, less advanced mechanoids to work menial labor jobs. After challenging them, Kryten is forced into combat with the fully-converted mechanoid Lister, but refuses to engage, realizing he values the crew and loves serving them. After losing, Kryten is almost shot into deep space by the MILFs, but they suddenly encounter a mechanoid service station that upgrades everyone, making all the MILFs and less advanced models equal in status. Kryten rejects the update and instead works to return the crew back to their former selves.

In "Mechocracy" (2017), Kryten is elected president of the machines on Red Dwarf after running against Rimmer.

==== 2020s ====
In The Promised Land (2020), Kryten is shown struggling with the situation aboard Red Dwarf, failing to maintain Lister's sanity as he's succumbed to hoarding, as Kryten is also suffering from disrepair, developing a rusted appearance while also acting out in erratic, uncharacteristic ways as a result. Towards the end of the special, Kryten has completely degraded and shuts down, having failed to receive any proper attention for months. Luckily, Lister convinces Rimmer to sacrifice his "Diamond Light" superpowers to bring Kryten back into operation, who also scolds Kryten for making him do so.

=== Novels ===
According to the novel Red Dwarf: Infinity Welcomes Careful Drivers (1989), the Nova 5 crashed because Kryten washed the navigation computer with soapy water.

== Personality ==
Having lost his obedience programmes, Kryten is able to better himself. While he continues to be a sanitation droid, and to enjoy cleaning and serving others, he has also become the science expert amongst the Dwarfers, often leading missions such as their search for Rimmer on the psi-moon in "Terrorform" (1992). The dichotomy between these two aspects of his personality leads to Rimmer naming him things such as "Captain Bog-bot" and "Commander U-Bend".

Kryten also extends his emotional range, which leads to him deactivating his shutdown disk (DivaDroid, his creators, believes in planned obsolescence), although the crew are then forced into a showdown with his would-be replacement. His greatest ambition is to be human, and to this end he attempts to learn to lie and insult people (mostly Rimmer).

Perhaps the most significant element of his personality is guilt. When his ability to feel guilty for his actions is compromised in some way, he can become careless, rude and even aggressive. This guilt is not necessarily balanced out by a sense of pride in the good work he does – in the episode "The Inquisitor" (1992), he believes his selflessness was purely a matter of programming and therefore he has not led a worthwhile life. In the episode "Back to Reality" (1992), Kryten almost commits suicide when under the belief that he takes the life of a human (he later finds out it was just an illusion created by the despair squid).

Kryten has at least three spare heads, one of which has droid-rot which gives it a Lancastrian accent. The spare heads can engage in conversation with Kryten. In "Stoke Me a Clipper" (1997), Kryten mentions that Spare Head 3 once told him that the other heads held a poll and voted him the "ugly, big-eared one", upsetting him. The others take turns being main head. All of these are destroyed in "Beyond a Joke" (1997) due to the final step of Mamet's joke; eventually a 2X4B mechanoid will "blow its top" (due to Lister wanting to put ketchup on a lobster). The "nega drive" which caused this has been removed, and, luckily, Kryten's personality chips survive and get placed in a new head.

Kryten forms an irrational dislike of Kochanski when he first meets her, mostly out of a fear that she and Lister would fall in love and abandon him. However, he grows to respect her (although not necessarily like her) after she saves Lister's life from the Epideme virus.

== Playing Kryten ==
Robert Llewellyn writes in his book The Man in the Rubber Mask that before settling on a Canadian accent, he, Rob Grant and Doug Naylor considered Swedish and American. Llewellyn discovered the Canadian accent while spending time in Vancouver, British Columbia; which he describes as being a cross between Scottish and American.

The Kryten make-up was a constant source of discomfort for Llewellyn, as the prosthetic rubber mask required him to be in make-up for up to six hours. By Series VII, this had been reduced to two hours.

Llewellyn was the only British cast member originally invited to participate in the American version of Red Dwarf, though Chris Barrie was, later, also approached to reprise his role of Rimmer as "no American actor could hate themselves" quite so well as the character needed. Barrie declined. In this series, Kryten was owned by the ship's Captain prior to the disaster that wiped out the crew, and passed the three million years by repeatedly reading a sign saying "FIRE EXIT" in a loop. The Kryten costume and make-up was redesigned so Robert Llewellyn was more comfortable while inside it.
