= David Verrey =

British television, film and stage actor

- Occupation: Actor
- Years active: 1989–present

David Verrey is a British television, film and stage actor.

== Television ==
His best known roles were those of Serge Starr in more than 200 episodes of the soap Family Affairs, Golgarach and McGrew in the children's adventure game series Knightmare and the shape shifting alien villain Joseph Green in the Doctor Who episodes "Aliens of London" (for which he also contributed an episode commentary to the Doctor Who: Complete Series One DVD boxset) and "World War Three". He has also guest starred in The Game, Musketeers, Game Of Thrones, Masterworks, The Bill, Judge John Deed, Agatha Christie's Poirot, Birds of a Feather, Red Dwarf, Lexx, "Law & Order UK", and Dream Team, amongst many other TV appearances.

== Film ==
He has appeared in featured roles in the Britcoms Bridget Jones: The Edge of Reason and Sixty Six, and in 2006 co-starred with Gabriel Byrne and Mira Sorvino in Alexander Buravsky's Russian-set World War II epic Attack on Leningrad.

== Theatre ==
David Verrey's theatre appearances are numerous, including seasons with the:

- Royal National Theatre
  - England People Very Nice
  - The Coast of Utopia
  - The Madness of George III (as Charles James Fox)
  - The Recruiting Officer
- Royal Shakespeare Company
  - The Comedy of Errors
- English Shakespeare Company
  - Hamlet (as Claudius)
  - The Merchant of Venice (as Shylock)
  - Romeo and Juliet (as Mercutio)

== Filmography ==
=== Television ===
Year	Title	Role	Notes
1989	Knightmare	Golgarach McGrew	8 episodes
1991	Paul Merton: The Series		Episode: #1.3
1991	London's Burning	Burly Bloke	Episode: #4.6
1993	Poirot	Chef	Episode: "The Adventure of the Italian Nobleman"
1995	Kavanagh QC	Duty Sergeant	Episode: "Nothing But the Truth"
1997	Supply & Demand	Bruce	Television film
1997	Birds of a Feather	Prison Officer	Episode: "Never the Twain"
1999	Red Dwarf	Big Meat	Episode: "Only the Good..."
1999	Family Affairs	Serge Pompidou	2 episodes
2001	Lexx	Businessman	Episode: "Fluff Daddy"
2005	Doctor Who	Joseph Green	2 episodes
2006	Ultimate Force	Police Officer	Episode: "Charlie Bravo"
2007	Judge John Deed	Martin Griffin MP PC	2 episodes
2007	The Afternoon Play	Judge	Episode: "Pieces of a Silver Lining"
1989, 2007	The Bill	Mark Bright Sam Bowman	2 episodes
2007	Diamond Geezer	Albert Silverman	Episode: "Old School Lies"
2008	Little Dorrit	Fat Man	Episode: #1.2
2011	Law & Order: UK	Rory Glenstock	Episode: "The Wrong Man"
2011	Garrow's Law	Thomas Capel	Episode: #3.2
2012	Game of Thrones	High Septon	Episode: "The Old Gods and the New"
2013	Ripper Street	Ambassador Volsky	Episode: "Tournament of Shadows"
2014	The Musketeers	Raul Mendoza	Episode: "Friends and Enemies"
2014	The Game	Edgar	Episode: "Episode 5"
2015	Holby City	Brendan Roberts	Episode: "Cover Story"
2018	Doctors	Phillip Chappell	Episode: "... You Shall Receive"
2018	The Long Song	George Sadler	Episode: #1.1
2020	Cursed	Sir Boone	Episode: "Alone"
2021–2023	Shadow and Bone	King Pyotr	3 episodes

=== Film ===
Year	Title	Role	Notes
2004	Bridget Jones: The Edge of Reason	Giles Benwick	
2006	Sixty Six	Mr. Kimmel	
2009	Attack on Lenigrad	Finli	credited as Devid Verrey
2012	Magwitch	Jaggers	Short film
2018	The Terrible Tale of Henrietta Tate	Mr. Control	Short film
2020	The Secret Garden	Jeremy	
2023	Napoleon	Gohier	
