= Cat (Red Dwarf) =

Fictional character in Red Dwarf

The Cat
- Red Dwarf character
- First appearance: "The End" (1988)
- Last appearance: Red Dwarf: The Promised Land (2020)
- Portrayed by: Danny John-Jules

In-universe information
- Full name: The Cat
- Nickname: Cat
- Species: Felix sapiens or Felis sapiens, descended from the house cat
- Gender: Male

The Cat, or simply Cat, is a fictional character in the British science fiction sitcom Red Dwarf. He is played by Danny John-Jules. He is a descendant of Dave Lister's pregnant pet house cat Frankenstein, whose descendants evolved into a humanoid form over three million years while Lister was in stasis (suspended animation). He is vain and aloof, and loves to dress in extravagant clothing. He is simply referred to as "Cat" in lieu of a real name.

== Fictional history ==
=== Television ===
==== 1980s ====
The "Cat" first appeared in Red Dwarf's first episode "The End" (1988). The computer of the mining ship Red Dwarf, Holly (Norman Lovett), mentions that before the crisis where all of Red Dwarf's crew died in a radiation leak, chicken soup machine repairman Dave Lister's (Craig Charles) pregnant cat, along with her unborn kittens, were safely sealed in the hold, while Lister was put into stasis as punishment for keeping the unquarantined animal on board. This cat, Frankenstein, is mentioned by the Cat as a story he learnt about at school, describing her as "The holy mother, saved by Cloister the Stupid, who was frozen in time, and who gaveth of his life that we might live ... who shall returneth to lead us to Fuchal, the promised land," with Lister realising that "Cloister the Stupid" refers to himself. Lister is left in stasis for three million years until the radiation reaches normal levels. Holly explains that during this time the cats evolved into humanoid lifeforms. After reawakening from stasis, Lister tells Holly to set a course for Fuchal, which is actually the archipelago of Fiji, where Lister had originally intended to take Frankenstein three million years earlier as part of his five-year plan.

In "Waiting for God" (1988), Holly translates a holy book written by the Cat's people, in which Lister is described as the cats' god "Cloister". His plan of buying a farm on Fiji and opening up a hot dog and doughnut diner has become their idea of Heaven, with Fiji known to the cat people as "Fuchal". Thousands of years of holy wars were fought by two factions: those who believed the humorous hats at Fuchal should be red, and those who believed they should be blue. Ironically, Lister had wanted them to be green. Eventually, the two factions formed a truce and built two great space arks to go and search for "Cloister" and the promised land. One of the two arks, following a set of sacred directions (Lister's laundry list, which he lined Frankenstein's basket with), promptly crashed into an asteroid. According to a dying cat priest (Noel Coleman), "the sick and the lame" cat people did not board the arks with the rest of the cats, and were left on Red Dwarf to die. Two of these cats were the Cat's parents, a female "cripple" and a male "idiot" who ate his own feet. Over time, the rest of the cat people died off.

According to Lister in "Me²" (1988), there are no other cats aboard Red Dwarf.

In "Parallel Universe" (1988) the crew attempt to use Holly's "Holly Hop Drive" to reach Earth. Instead it lands them in a parallel universe with another version of Red Dwarf, populated by female versions of the crew. However, rather than having a female Cat on board, there is a male humanoid Dog (played by Matthew Devitt). He is depicted as flea-ridden, having an interest in smelling people's behinds, and a fear of baths.

In "Timeslides" (1989), the Cat race temporarily ceases to exist after Lister enters a photographic slide developed with mutated developing fluid and travels back in time, convincing his younger self (played by Emile Charles) to become wealthy and successful by not joining the Space Corps. The hologram Arnold Rimmer (Chris Barrie) unwittingly reverses this new timeline by going back in time to his boyhood self (played by Simon Gaffney), causing the Cat race to come back into existence.

==== 1990s ====
The pleasure GELF (genetically-engineered lifeform), Camille, appears in the episode "Camille" (1991). She is perceived as whoever the person looking at her desires the most, being described by the Cat as his "perfect mate". This is revealed to be a double of the Cat himself (also played by John-Jules).

In "Demons and Angels" (1992), Red Dwarf is blown up when the beam of a device called the triplicator is put into reverse, putting the engine core into meltdown, while creating a "high" and "low" version of Red Dwarf, complete with their own versions of the Cat (both played by John-Jules). Before the lifespans of both versions of Red Dwarf expire after an hour, the crew collect pieces of the triplicator from both Red Dwarfs, and restore the original Red Dwarf by amalgamating the two copies with a rebuilt triplicator. The "high" version of the Cat is blown up by a bomb the "lows" throw at him, while the "low" version disappears with his version of Red Dwarf.

In "Back to Reality" (1992), ink from a "despair squid" causes Lister, Rimmer, the Cat, and mechanoid Kryten (Robert Llewellyn) to experience a shared hallucination, where qualities they each consider "quintessential to [their] self-esteem" are attacked. In the hallucination, the Cat loses his "cool", and becomes a "no-style gimbo" with a massive overbite and unflattering clothes called Duane Dibbley. The four nearly commit suicide together, but a mood stabiliser saves them at the last second.

In "Psirens" (1993), Kryten explains that Red Dwarf was "stolen", with the crew now based inside the shuttlecraft Starbug chasing after Red Dwarf to recover it.

In "Emohawk: Polymorph II" (1993), an emotion-leeching "emohawk" attacks Starbug and consumes the Cat's "cool", turning him into his "Duane Dibley" persona. The emohawk is captured, and Lister freezes it with liquid dilinium. The crew plan to extract the emohawk's DNA strands and re-inject the Cat with them to return his emotions to normal, but the Cat clumsily freezes everyone else before this can be done.

In "Out of Time" (1993), Rimmer mentions that all trace of Red Dwarf has been lost. In the episode, a Starbug from fifteen years hence arrives, with Lister, Rimmer, Cat and Kryten's future selves intending to copy some components from the present Starbug's time drive so they can fix the fault in their own drive and continue their lives of opulence, socialising with notorious figures of history such as the Habsburgs, the Borgias, Louis XVI, Adolf Hitler and Hermann Göring. Lister tells the future crew to leave, and the future Starbug fires upon the present day one, apparently killing the crew and blowing Starbug up.

In the following episode, "Tikka to Ride" (1997), Lister mentions in a video log that the future Starbug destroying the Starbug of the present meant the time drive they had used ceased to exist in both the present and the future, or in other words, killing the present crew of Starbug also killed the crew in the future, making it impossible for the future crew to ever travel back in time to kill themselves in the present. The Cat later mentions in the episode that time returned to the point before the time drive was discovered.

In "Ouroboros" (1997), a Cat from a parallel dimension (played by John-Jules) is briefly seen, when a "linkway" through "non-space" is opened when the membrane between the two realities temporarily collapses.

In "Epideme" (1997), the Cat mentions he brought himself up, and as a result had no formal education. Because there was no one else around, the Cat had to teach himself, and because the Cat barely knew anything to begin with, lessons were "long and slow", especially on Thursdays when he had "double nothing". Lister has his right arm amputated in an attempt to rid his body of the Epideme virus (voiced by Gary Martin). Navigation Officer Kristine Kochanski (Chloë Annett) eliminates the virus by temporarily stopping Lister's heart and containing the virus in deceased Red Dwarf crewmember Caroline Carmen's (Nicky Leatherbarrow) arm, injected with blood and adrenaline, tricking the virus into thinking the arm belongs to Kochanski. In the following episode, "Nanarchy" (1997), Kryten tries looking for his self-repairing nanobots to rebuild Lister's arm. Returning to the part of space where they were last seen, the crew discovers Red Dwarf has been converted by the nanobots into a planetoid made of sand. Holly has beem restored to his old settings and abandoned there, with the Red Dwarf Starbug spent years chasing after being a subatomic version shrunken down and eventually exploring Lister's laundry basket, and the remaining bits they didn't want being left on the planetoid. Kryten orders the nanobots to rebuild Lister's arm and turn the planetoid back into Red Dwarf.

In Back in the Red (1999), Holly creates a new set of nanobots to bring the entire crew on board Red Dwarf back to life after Kryten's had gone missing again. Included among the resurrected crew is Rimmer, after the hologrammatic simulation of Rimmer left Starbug. Lister, Rimmer, Cat, Kryten and Kochanski are sentenced to two years in the ship's brig for misuse of confidential information. In "Cassandra" (1999), the five of them get signed up by Lister to the convict army the Canaries after Holly lies to Lister that they're a singing troupe.

In "Only the Good..." (1999), a corrosive micro-organism is shown eating apart Red Dwarf. Rimmer crosses into a "mirror universe" where everything is opposite, and obtains the formula to antidote to the micro-organism from that universe's version of the Cat (played by John-Jules), an intelligent professor who does "stupid sciencey brainbox type stuff". However, upon returning to the normal universe, the paper with the formula on it turns into the micro-organism's formula. Not being able to find anyone on Red Dwarf, a vending machine (voiced by Tony Slattery) informs Rimmer that everyone crossed back into the mirror universe. The machine opening the way to the mirror universe is shown to have been destroyed by the micro-organism, leaving Rimmer stranded and the only crew member aboard Red Dwarf in his universe.

==== 2000s ====
In Red Dwarf: Back to Earth (2009), set nine years later, Red Dwarf is intact; the human race is apparently "virtually extinct" in the universe apart from Lister again; Lister, Rimmer, the Cat and Kryten are the only people on board the ship; and Rimmer is shown to be a hard light hologram and the most senior officer on board again; how these have come about and what happened to the micro-organism is not explained. In this special, a female "despair squid", whose ink causes joy and elation instead of despair to defend herself, causes Lister, Rimmer, the Cat and Kryten to share a hallucination where they believe they are fictional characters from a TV series called Red Dwarf, and their dimension is "invalid". This leads them to be shown being pulled into the nearest "valid" reality. They confront the "Creator" of Red Dwarf (Richard O'Callaghan) on a version of 21st century Earth who is ready to kill off the characters, and Lister accidentally kills him. The four subconsciously realise that they're hallucinating, and they wake up on board Red Dwarf. Kryten and Rimmer speculate that they were able to choose whether or not they wanted to wake up because of the strengthened antibodies of the four from the previous encounter with the despair squid.

==== 2010s ====
In "The Beginning" (2012), the Cat deduces that Rimmer's long-dead father (Simon Treves) is continuing to haunt him, preventing Rimmer from coming up with a plan to battle a simulant fleet. The Cat tells Rimmer to let his father go. Rimmer does so by playing his father's message, which he is only supposed to do once he becomes an officer. This proves that Rimmer no longer cares what his father has to say, and is free of this "demon" inside of him messing up his head, leading to a successful attack devised by Rimmer which defeats the simulants.

In "Can of Worms" (2016), the Cat becomes the host body of a genetically engineered polymorph's eggs after the polymorph disguises herself as a female Felis sapien (played by Dominique Moore) and goes on a date with the Cat. The polymorph reaches the end of her life cycle after implanting the eggs, and Lister and the Cat kill the offspring after the Cat gives birth to them. In this episode he inadvertently reveals himself to be a virgin, and insists that being impregnated by the polymorph "still counts".

In "Cured" (2017), it is revealed that Cat is a psychopath as he has many of the qualities of a psychopath such as narcissism, selfishness, and an inability to understand other people's feelings.

In "Skipper" (2017), Rimmer uses a quantum skipper to travel to a universe where Lister is kind and hardworking. Here, Lister got put into stasis because he smuggled a pet rat on board, rather than a pet cat. The rat race did not have a religious war when they evolved, but stayed on Red Dwarf, living on most of its decks.

==== 2020s ====
In The Promised Land (2020), its revealed Cat is the brother of Rodon (played by Ray Fearon), the Cat warlord seeking to usurp Lister (called Cloister by the Felis sapiens) as their race's new god. Upon being informed of this by a subordinate of his, Rodon remembers him, recollecting how they abandoned him and everyone else they deemed to be "uncool" when the Cat people originally left Red Dwarf. In a sudden act of mercy, Rodon invites Cat to rejoin them and be spared from dying, as they have planted a bomb set to destroy the ship and kill its remaining crew. Cat rejects Rodon and refuses to leave the crew, proclaiming Red Dwarf to be his true home.

=== Novels ===
According to the novel Red Dwarf: Infinity Welcomes Careful Drivers (1989), the cause of the Cat's people's civil war was over whether their god was named Cloister or Clister.

== Character ==
The Cat exhibits qualities of vanity, such as in "The End" (1988), where his first words are "How am I looking? I'm looking nice!"

In early episodes, the Cat exhibits typical feline behaviours such as licking anyone who gives him food, playing with "shiny things" and marking his territory, for which purpose he carries a small spray-can in his pocket. While scent-marking, he repeats, "This is mine, this is mine, and all of this is mine." He bats his food around when it is served on the table, explaining to his startled shipmates, "that is what cats do with [live] food!"

His extreme self-confidence results in him thinking himself to be irresistible to women. He is originally very self-centred, acting purely without concern when his old mentor the "Cat Priest" dies, giving Kryten an earring that the Cat hates on the day before Kryten's automatic self-destruct is scheduled and choosing to finish his lunch rather than carry Lister to the medical bay when he collapses. In the episode "Backwards" (1989), Lister asks the Cat if he cares about anyone but himself, to which the Cat responds, "Hell no! I don't even care about you." This behaviour becomes less prevalent as the series goes on. In the episode Cured it is revealed that he is a psychopath because of these characteristics.

By Series IV, the Cat becomes less obsessed with mating, and begins to develop a friendship with Lister and Kryten, although he maintains a strong dislike for Rimmer. As he learns to relate to the crew, he stops licking them and marking his territory, and even begins to show genuine concern for others on several occasions. He becomes a skilled pilot of Starbug and develops an ability to "smell" dangerous phenomena, even in space— although he does not grasp scientific terms, describing anomalies as a "swirly thing" in the episode "Legion" (1993), and in the episode "Ouroboros" (1997), when asked by Kryten if something "weird" on Starbug's long-range scan is a "wibbly thing" or a "swirly thing", the Cat says he would "hate to commit [himself]" at such an early stage.

== Style ==
The Cat is obsessed with his own superficial attractiveness and has an enormous and flamboyant wardrobe, which he couples with an obsession with his reflection and a penchant for preening. He has been described as "a vain, preening fashion plate who resembles James Brown with fangs", and Danny John-Jules has described the character of Cat as based on a combination of Little Richard's look, James Brown's moves and Richard Pryor's facial expressions. When auditioning for the show John-Jules attended the audition in character, wearing his father's wedding suit, which he described as a "zoot suit". In order to understand the role, John-Jules studied the 1986 book Catwatching by Desmond Morris, learning, among other things, not to blink while in character.

In the first episode the Cat is introduced wearing a pink suit, which Danny John-Jules described as feeling "like an old Cab Calloway suit". Concerning his character, Danny John-Jules has said "He's probably like a little girl the first time she puts on makeup and says 'Hey this stuff looks good...'."

During the first two series, the Cat typically dressed in various 1940s-era suits (often gray or pink, with big shoulders and pocket handkerchiefs). He would also wear Cuban-heeled shoes with most of his outfits. He would also wear suits with tailed jackets and ruffled shirts (most notably cream-coloured or reddish-pink). Over the next three seasons, the Cat began wearing flashier outfits (like a tartan three-piece suit) and more leather and vinyl outfits (with boots). He also began wearing brightly coloured hats and coats, such as his zebra-print coat (later revamped to yellow and black). He began sporting more jewellery and earrings.

Starting with series 6 and on through 7, The Cat's wardrobe was drastically simplified (John-Jules jokingly speculated that this was done as a cost-saving measure). He wore a black pvc jumpsuit (often with gloves) with a limited number of coats or suits worn over it. Ironically, he spent most of series 8 either in his prison jumpsuit or his battle fatigues.

== In other media ==
In the episode "Parallel Universe", the Cat performs the song "Tongue Tied", which appears as a dream sequence on a "dream monitor". The song was later released as a single and reached number 17 in October 1993 in the UK Singles Chart. The artist was listed simply as "The Cat".

== US pilot ==
In the first and second pilot episodes of an American version of the television series, the Cat was played by Hinton Battle and Terry Farrell respectively. (Farrell's version was more outwardly catlike in appearance.)
