= Red Dwarf: Back to Earth =

Three-part miniseries of Red Dwarf

- Genre: Comic science fiction; Sitcom
- Created by: Rob Grant and Doug Naylor
- Written by: Doug Naylor
- Directed by: Doug Naylor
- Starring: Chris Barrie; Craig Charles; Danny John-Jules; Robert Llewellyn
- Country of origin: United Kingdom
- Original language: English
- No. of episodes: 3 (list of episodes)

Production
- Executive producers: Charles Armitage; Doug Naylor
- Producer: Helen Norman
- Running time: 25 mins approx
- Production company: Grant Naylor Productions

Original release
- Network: Dave; Dave HD (Repeats)
- Release: 10 April – 12 April 2009

Related
- Red Dwarf VIII; Red Dwarf X; Red Dwarf

Red Dwarf: Back to Earth (also referred to as Red Dwarf IX) is a three-part miniseries continuation of the British science fiction sitcom Red Dwarf, broadcast on UK television channel Dave between 10 and 12 April 2009 and subsequently released on DVD on 15 June 2009 and on Blu-ray on 31 August 2009. It was the first television outing for Red Dwarf in over ten years.

The miniseries follows the technician Dave Lister (Craig Charles), who is the only survivor of an accident on the spaceship Red Dwarf, and the last survivor of the human race, three million years in the future, and his shipmates, a holographic reproduction of his dead bunkmate and boss, Arnold Rimmer (Chris Barrie), a sapient Cat (Danny John-Jules) who is a result of three million years' evolution and sanitation droid Kryten (Robert Llewellyn).

The storyline involves the characters arriving back on Earth, circa 2009, only to find that they are characters in a television series called Red Dwarf.

== Plot ==
"Part One" begins on Red Dwarf, nine years after the events of Series VIII. Kochanski (Chloë Annett), Lister's love interest, is apparently dead, and Holly is out of commission because Lister caused a flood and the Skutters are busy drying him out.

The crew note that water supplies are low, and discover a giant squid in the water tank when they go to investigate. After they escape from the encounter, the squid disappears, and Katerina Bartikovsky (Sophie Winkleman), a former Red Dwarf science officer, materialises. Informing Rimmer that he is to be switched off in 24 hours, she uses the ship's equipment to analyse the leviathan's DNA and manages to turn a mining laser into a dimension cutter, in the hope of opening up a portal so that Lister can find a mate and restart the human race.

"Part Two" begins with the discovery that the Red Dwarf crew inhabit an "invalid dimension". Zeroing in on the nearest valid reality, the portal sucks the crew to Earth in 2009, only to find that in this world, their adventures have been turned into a fictional television show called Red Dwarf. As a result of the discovery they quickly accept that they themselves are merely fictional characters, and find a DVD of the "Back to Earth" special. Alarmed to discover that they are to die at the end of the final episode, they resolve to track down their creators and plead for more life. While on a bus, Lister meets two kids who are fans of the show and who reassure him that, despite all of his faults, he is a heroic and cool character to them. Their theory about Kochanski's fate is that, since Kryten was the only person who actually witnessed her supposed 'death', it seems likely that Kochanski simply tired of Lister and left Red Dwarf, with Kryten trying to spare Lister's feelings by claiming she had died. Kryten later admits that the children were correct. Bartikovsky informs Rimmer that it is not wrong to kill a hologram, so he pushes her under a bus.

In "Part Three", the crew track down actor Craig Charles on the set of Coronation Street and ask him to reveal the location of their creator. After they locate him, the Creator (Richard O'Callaghan) reveals that he intends to kill off the crew, but he is himself killed by a now-keen-to-remain-alive Lister. Shortly afterwards, the crew discover that they are in a shared hallucination caused by a female relative of the despair squid that uses joy, rather than despair, to subdue victims. Kochanski appears before Lister, tempting him to remain behind, but having discovered his Kochanski may still be alive in his own reality, he chooses to wake up and return with the others. As the crew head back to their sleeping quarters, the Cat admits that he brought the female despair squid to Red Dwarf with the intention of eating it, and they reflect on the ridiculous idea that anyone could consider them fictional characters.

== Production ==
In August 2008, Robert Llewellyn appeared on Seattle public television station, KCTS 9. In an interview, he revealed that BBC Worldwide, in collaboration with another party, had invested in 72 minutes of new Red Dwarf to be filmed in early 2009. Grant Naylor Productions announced that it had been "on the cards" since February 2008. It subsequently transpired that UKTV channel Dave would screen four new 24-minute specials to celebrate the twenty-first anniversary of the series. The new episodes form part of an effort by Dave to screen more original programming, instead of just repeats.

It was subsequently announced in January 2009 that the new special was to be a brand new two-part story titled Red Dwarf: Back to Earth, broadcast over the Easter weekend of that year, along with a "making of" documentary and a one-off entitled Red Dwarf: Unplugged, which was intended to be an improvised episode. On 20 February 2009, it was announced that Red Dwarf: Back to Earth would now be a three-part special and that the "unplugged" episode had been postponed. Unplugged had been described by Craig Charles as "just the four of us—and some chairs—trying to improvise, or rather trying to remember, classic scenes".

Back to Earth itself was not filmed in front of a studio audience due to budgetary constraints. Although this was not the first time this has happened (series seven was filmed entirely without a live audience), it is the first time a laughter track was not added for broadcast. It was also the first time Red Dwarf was filmed in high definition, this time using the Red camera system. It is shot at a very high, 4K resolution.

== Promotion ==
On 13 March 2009, SFX announced that they had released a limited edition of issue 181 onto the newsstands. This edition was limited to 50 nationwide and featured the cast of the Back to Earth series instead of the standard Doctor Who cover. The magazine also plays an important part in the episode itself; Dave Bradley, editor of SFX is quoted as saying, "Our cover plays a key part in the storyline." In the series, the magazine cover helped to illustrate the fact that Red Dwarf was just a television series, and it also led Lister to investigate the nature of Kochanski's disappearance after seeing an article about the actress who plays her.

Dave started a viral marketing campaign in March 2009, when listerscominghome.co.uk was introduced to the public. The site shows a postcard, and reveals minor details of the series to the viewer. Dave also released several videos on their site, including a mock-advertisement for the "Carbug", a modified Smart Fortwo to fit the shape and style of Starbug. On-set videos also were released, along with short teasers (under ten seconds), with some 30-second teasers as well. Cast members have also written for the Dave blog, releasing small bits of information about the shows. The viral campaign went on to win a Broadcast Digital Award for Best Use of Digital Technology.

== Broadcast ==
Red Dwarf: Back to Earth was broadcast over the Easter weekend of 2009, along with a "making of" documentary. The episodes were televised over three nights starting on Friday, 10 April 2009.

== Guest stars ==
Red Dwarf: Back to Earth featured the following guest actors:

Actor	Episode(s)	Character
Sophie Winkleman	Part One, Part Two	Katerina Bartikovsky
Chloë Annett	Part Three	Kristine Kochanski
Richard O'Callaghan	Part Three	Creator
Jeremy Swift	Part Two	Noddy
Simon Gregson	Part Three	Himself
Michelle Keegan	Part Three	Herself
Richard Ng	Part Two	Swallow
Charlie Kenyon	Part Two	Boy on the Bus
Nina Southworth	Part Two	Girl on the Bus
Tom Andrews	Part Two	Salesman
Karen Admiraal	Part Two	Woman
Jon Glover	Part Two	Man
Julian Ryder	Part Two	Bus Driver

== Reception ==
According to Red Dwarf's official website, four million people watched Part One over the four-day Easter weekend. Part Two attracted an audience of three million, whilst Part Three earned a rating of just over 2.9 million. The Making of Back To Earth was watched by 1.5 million people. The broadcasts received record ratings for Freeview channel Dave; the first of the three episodes represented the UK's highest ever viewing figures for a commissioned programme on a digital network.

It has been noted that the final episode in particular is heavily influenced by Blade Runner, "the film that inspired series creators Rob Grant and Doug Naylor to put pen to paper in the first place," though questions have been raised over the artistic success of this homage.

Channel head Steve North reported some months after the event that the Dave network was "delighted with how the new shows have gone" and responded coyly to rumours that a new series had been commissioned. In June 2010, Craig Charles and Chris Barrie confirmed plans to produce further series. In April 2011, a six-episode tenth series, to be broadcast in October 2012, was officially announced; principal photography for the series took place in December 2011 and January 2012.

Red Dwarf X was broadcast on UK television channel Dave between 4 October 2012 and 8 November 2012. Series XI was broadcast in 2016 and Series XII began in 2017.

== Episodes ==
No. overall	No. in series	Title	Directed by	Written by	Original release date	Prod. code	Viewers (millions)
53	1	"Back to Earth: Part One"	Doug Naylor	Doug Naylor	10 April 2009	1	2.4
54	2	"Back to Earth: Part Two"	Doug Naylor	Doug Naylor	11 April 2009	2	1.2
55	3	"Back to Earth: Part Three"	Doug Naylor	Doug Naylor	12 April 2009	3	1.2

== Home media ==
Back to Earth was released on DVD on 15 June 2009. The cover of the DVD is a replica of the one featured in part two of the specials, with a few cosmetic changes, such as replacing "Coming Soon" with "Director's Cut" and the addition of the plot synopsis read by Lister, which was absent on the prop. There are two methods of viewing the specials, the broadcast episodes as shown on Dave, and a new "Director's cut" in which all three episodes have been edited together into a single feature length programme, with a few lines of dialogue trimmed, such as Rimmer's bemoaning it being a three-parter, but no extra scenes or dialogue were added with the exception of "The End" being typed on a typewriter following extended end credits. There is also a Smeg Ups compilation (outtakes) and featurettes, including the broadcast "making of", and a new-to-DVD Part Two, which is nearly twice the length of the first.

Continuing the metafictional theme of the storyline, during one scene Lister is shown reading the back of the DVD case for Back to Earth—what he reads is similar to what is printed on the real-life DVD case, and the two-disc clamshell is formatted the same way (although the inner labels are different).

A Blu-ray Disc version was released on 31 August 2009, containing the same material as the DVD but all in 1080i except for a few features (it was encoded in 1080i rather than 1080p to preserve the original play-speed of the broadcast and DVD version) followed by a US DVD & Blu-ray release on 6 October 2009.

The miniseries was released on DVD in Japan, combined with Red Dwarf X, on 3 February 2015. The series was re-dubbed in Japanese, with Hiroshi Iwasaki replacing Sukekiyo Kameyama as the voice of Kryten following the latter's death.
