= Double X: The Name of the Game =

- Directed by: Shani Grewal
- Written by: David Fleming (Novel); Shani Grewal
- Produced by: Noel Cronin; Shani Grewal; Edward Joffe
- Starring: Norman Wisdom; William Katt; Bernard Hill; Gemma Craven; Simon Ward; Chloë Annett
- Music by: Raf Ravenscroft
- Distributed by: Odeon Entertainment (DVD)
- Release date: June 1992
- Running time: 95 minutes
- Country: United Kingdom
- Language: English

Double X: The Name of the Game (also known as Double X and The Name of the Game) is a 1992 British thriller film directed by Shani Grewal and starring Norman Wisdom, William Katt, Gemma Craven, Simon Ward, Bernard Hill and Chloë Annett. The screenplay was by Grewal based on the short story Vengeance by David Fleming.

== Plot ==
Expert safecracker Arthur Clutten masterminds heists for a criminal syndicate he belongs to. But after witnessing the brutal methods of persuasion being meted out by gang leader, Ignatius Smith, Clutten decides to quit. But he realises the gang would sooner see him killed than quitting. After stealing some documents incriminating Smith and his boss, Edward Ross, Clutten then puts his family in hiding and goes on the run...but his daughter has been kidnapped by the gang and a hitman has been hired and is close to finding Clutten.

== Cast ==
- Norman Wisdom as Arthur Clutten
- William Katt as Michael Cooper
- Gemma Craven as Jenny Eskridge
- Simon Ward as Edward Ross
- Bernard Hill as Ignatious 'Iggy' Smith
- Chloë Annett as Sarah Clutten
- Leon Herbert as Ollie
- Derren Nesbitt as the minister
- Vladek Sheybal as pawnbroker

=== Cast notes ===
- First film role for Norman Wisdom in 20 years.
- Chloë Annett makes her feature film début.
- Last film of Vladek Sheybal.

== Reception ==
Derek Elley wrote inVariety: "Veteran Brit pratfall comic Norman Wisdom makes an ill-advised return to the big screen in Double X: The Name of the Game, an inept low-budget suspenser .... Reliable cast is double-crossed by a laughable script and clumsy helming. ... Wisdom, sadly miscast, is dramatically wobbly and looks uneasy throughout. Hill, as a comic psycho, seems out of place and Craven is wasted as a frump-turned-hardnosed-moll. Ward, looking like an overfed Christopher Walken, has fleeting moments as the org’s oily boss and Katt is solid as the Yank."

== Production ==
It was filmed in the UK at the following locations Monkey Island, Bray, Berkshire, Portpatrick and Stranraer, Dumfries and Galloway, Scotland.

== DVD release ==
The DVD was released onto Region 2 DVD on 25 February 2007 in the UK under "The BEST of BRITISH Collection" tag by Odeon Entertainment.
