= Kristine Kochanski =

- Red Dwarf character
- Chloë Annett as Kochanski
- First appearance: "The End"
- Last appearance: "Red Dwarf: Back to Earth (Part Three)"
- Portrayed by: Clare Grogan (Series 1–2, 6); Chloë Annett (Series 7–9); Holly Earl (young, Season 8)

In-universe information
- Species: Human
- Gender: Female
- Significant other: David Lister
- Children: David Lister

Kristine Z. Kochanski (Note: The episode “Confidence & Paranoia” shows Kochanski’s first initial as “C.” on her hologram disc. However, the spelling of Kochanski's full name was retconned to Kristine with a “K,” as shown on her memorial during part one of Red Dwarf: Back to Earth (2009).) is a fictional character from the British science fiction comedy programme Red Dwarf. Kochanski was the first console officer in the navigation chamber on board the spaceship Red Dwarf. As well as appearing in the television series, she is also a major character in the Red Dwarf novel Last Human. In series 1, 2, and 6 she was played by Clare Grogan and was then played by Chloë Annett for series 7 and 8, and the 2009 special Back to Earth.

== Fictional history ==
=== Television ===
==== 1980s ====
Kochanski (played by Clare Grogan) briefly appears in "The End" (1988). Later in the episode, after Dave Lister (Craig Charles) is released from three million years in stasis, Holly (Norman Lovett) confirms to Lister that Kochanski is dead following a radiation leak caused by a drive plate aboard the spaceship Red Dwarf being repaired inefficiently. Lister tells Holly that she was going to come with him as part of his plan to buy a farm in Fiji, but Lister never got round to telling her.

In the first two series, it becomes apparent that Lister lusted after Kochanski from a distance and occasionally flirted with her but never had a relationship with her, never having had the courage to ask her out. Indeed, in "Balance of Power" (1988), Holly tells Lister that he had shared a total of 173 words with her, fewer words than he had shared with his rubber plant. In the same episode, Lister mentions that he had always been crazy about Kochanski but never acted on his feelings, and is also insecure enough to believe Arnold Rimmer, posing as Kochanski (again played by Grogan), when Rimmer tells him, "I just don't like you." The Kochanski Rimmer also asks Lister why he didn't tell Kochanski about his feelings for her while she was still alive, and Lister, upon realising that "Kochanski" is in fact Rimmer in disguise, tells Rimmer that Lister and Kochanski "never made love". When Lister is revived from stasis, one of the first things he wants to do is revive Kochanski's hologram. But as the ship can only officially generate one hologram at a time, Rimmer (played by Chris Barrie) refuses to allow it, and goes so far as to hide Kochanski's personality disc.

In "Confidence and Paranoia" (1988), Lister, after looking through Kochanski's dream recorder, discovers that Kochanski dreamt about him three times. He believes from this that Kochanski might have been infatuated with him, too, and questions why he never asked Kochanski out. Lister (along with a physical manifestation of his confidence, played by Craig Ferguson) hits upon an idea of how to generate two holograms at once and also deduces where Rimmer has hidden the personality discs – only to discover too late that Kochanski's personality disc has been switched for a duplicate of Rimmer's. It was originally going to be Kochanski's hologram that was generated, but as the script for "Bodysnatcher" wasn't finished, they dumped the idea and immediately came up with "Me²".

In a possible future seen in the episode "Stasis Leak" (1988), Lister finds out that his future self from five years hence has gone back in time and married Kochanski three weeks before the accident which causes Red Dwarf to leave the Solar System; their wedding and honeymoon taking place while Kochanski is on planet leave at the Ganymede Holiday Inn. This version of Lister's future has still yet to be portrayed outside of "Stasis Leak" as of 2026.

==== 1990s ====
Suzanne Rhatigan as "Kochanski Camille"

Lister's fantasy of his perfect companion in "Camille" (1991) was initially intended to be Kochanski (played by Clare Grogan once again), but it was felt that the inexplicable and implausible re-appearance of Lister's true love (or at least enduring obsession) would tip him off too early as to the true nature of the creature that Kryten (Robert Llewellyn) rescues in the episode. The character was changed in clothing and attitude to more or less a female version of Lister, played by Suzanne Rhatigan; however, the fact that Rhatigan bore a physical resemblance to Grogan still allowed her to be identified as playing "Kochanski Camille" in the credits. A line of dialogue by Lister explicitly referencing their resemblance was ultimately cut from the broadcast episode, and later included in deleted scenes on the Series IV DVD.

Kochanski's previously established history with Lister where she barely interacted with him is retconned in "DNA" (1991), when Lister mentions Kochanski having "finished with [him]" back before the accident that killed her. Following this break up, he recalls going for a walk in the botanical gardens and looking at a squirrel, thinking, "You lucky little sod. You like your job, you're your own boss and you've got no woman trouble, so you'll never feel as bad as I feel now." This affected Lister enough for him to tell the crew of Red Dwarf that for a split second, he would have given anything to swap places with the squirrel.

In "Dimension Jump" (1991), a Kochanski from a dimension where Lister is more successful is mentioned but not seen as being married to that dimension's Lister "Spanners" (also played by Craig Charles), with twin boys, Jim and Bexley.

In "Psirens" (1993), while rejogging Lister's memory following Lister awakening from two hundred years of deep sleep, Kryten explicitly explains to Lister that Kochanski dated Lister for three weeks before "discard[ing]" him for a catering officer. Grogan returns in this episode, portraying an illusion of Kochanski created by the genetically engineered lifeforms the Psirens to tempt Lister.

In "Ouroboros" (1997), Kochanski (now played by Chloë Annett) is seen crossing through a linkway originating from a parallel universe along with alternate versions of Lister, Kryten and the Cat (played by Charles, Llewellyn and Danny John-Jules), who agree to exchange supplies with the "Dwarfers". In a flashback set in her parallel world, Kochanski's backstory shows Lister returning from shore leave on Mimas to take a few days off to get over Kochanski after she broke up with him. This version of Kochanski later apologises for the Dear John letter she sent Lister the previous week. She describes her love life with Lister as having gone nowhere and amounting to "hanging out in [Lister's] bunk, eating delivery curries and having fantastic sex". She explains to Lister that she is back together with her ex, a chef called Tim. Kochanski discovers the unquarantined cat Lister smuggled on board and takes her, but is unable to kill her and hides her instead.

Back in the present, the original Lister is shown coming to the realisation that the parallel Lister had to have died in the radiation leak that wiped out Red Dwarf, and the parallel Lister explains that he was brought back as a hologram by that universe's version of Holly. He says that the cat was discovered, and Kochanski was the person who was punished and put into stasis instead. The original Lister also realises that the parallel Lister's relationship with Kochanski was rekindled. Kryten later tells the original Lister that after the parallel universe Lister's death, that universe's Lister was originally a soft light hologram before becoming hard light, and this made him "caring in a way that most men aren't".

The linkway between universes is shown breaking apart being fired upon by a GELF spaceship, with Kochanski subsequently being left stranded on board Starbug in the original Lister's universe. Kochanski asks the living Lister to fill an in-vitro tube which already has Kochanski's DNA inside with his own, as Kochanski, the last known human from her universe, wishes to have children some day. Lister also realises that the in-vitro tube with Kochanski and Lister's genetic information is Lister himself, creating a paradox where Lister is his own father and Kochanski is "me ex-girlfriend and me mum". Lister also says that at some point after his development and birth inside a uterine simulator, the baby Lister must have been sent back in time to the pub that Lister (Alexander John-Jules) is seen abandoned in the beginning of the episode. The story later skips ahead to when this happens.

After being trapped with the "Dwarfers" in their universe, the alternate Kochanski adds something of a new dynamic to the show. Much of the humour in her scenes comes from the difference between her frame of reference and that of the others. Although Annett lacks Grogan's Scottish accent, in "Duct Soup" (1997), Kochanski reveals that she was from the trendiest part of Glasgow (the Gorbals, according to Lister), and had spent her childhood in "Cyberschool" with perfect computer-generated settings and perfect computer-generated friends and a pony named "Trumper" before entering Space Cadet School. Her initial reaction to the meagre conditions of life aboard Starbug is one of utter despair, as well as disdain for the "Dwarfers" as inferior versions of the people she knew in her dimension.

In "Epideme" (1997), Lister is infected by the Epideme virus (voiced by Gary Martin) after it transfers from the corpse of one of Red Dwarf's old crewmembers, Caroline Carmen (Nicky Leatherbarrow), into Lister's body. Kryten attempts to isolate the virus and amputate Lister's left arm in an attempt to stop the virus from killing him, but this still does not work because Kochanski makes a mistake, and as a result they are forced to amputate Lister's right arm instead. Kochanski then temporarily stops Lister's heart, and tricks the virus into jumping to Caroline's arm, which Kochanski had injected with adrenaline and blood, by making the virus think it was Kochanski's. Subsequently, Kryten restarts Lister's heart.

In "Nanarchy" (1997), the crew discover Kryten's nanobots in Lister's dirty washing basket, and get them to rebuild Lister's arm and turn the sandy planetoid the nanobots had converted from the atoms of Red Dwarf back to its original form. Continuing from the end of "Nanarchy", Back in the Red (1999) depicts the crew crash landing Starbug in Red Dwarf's landing bay, where the deceased crew are shown having been brought back by an all new set of nanobots created by Holly after Kryten's had gone missing. After being put on trial via a scan of their minds, the original charges against Lister, Kryten, the Cat (also played by Danny John-Jules) and Kochanski are dropped, but the four members of Starbug, along with Holly and a Rimmer reconstructed by the nanobots, are sentenced to the brig for two years after being found guilty of abusing classified information. In "Cassandra" (1999), Kochanski, along with the rest of the cast, are shown being signed up by Lister to the convict army the Canaries, after Holly lies to Lister that they're a singing troupe.

In "Only the Good..." (1999), a corrosive and chameleonic microbe is shown eating apart Red Dwarf. After Rimmer tries and fails to obtain the formula for an antidote from a "mirror universe" and not being able to find anyone on Red Dwarf, a vending machine (voiced by Tony Slattery) informs Rimmer that everyone had crossed back into the mirror universe. The machine opening the way to the mirror universe is shown to have been destroyed by the microbe, leaving Rimmer stranded and the only crew member aboard Red Dwarf in his universe.

==== 2000s ====
In Red Dwarf: Back to Earth (2009), Lister believes Kochanski to be dead, but a conversation between Lister and two children (played by Charlie Kenyon and Nina Southworth) in a hallucination caused by a female version of the despair squid, which causes joy rather than despair, reveals that her death is a cover story and that in truth she dumped Lister by fleeing Red Dwarf in a Blue Midget shuttle and that Kryten hid the truth by claiming she was sucked out of an airlock. This is later confirmed by Kryten. Annett appears briefly in the special, as a hallucination of Kochanski created by Lister's desire to be reunited with her. In the end Lister rejects the hallucination, in the hope of one day finding the real Kochanski again.

==== 2010s ====
In "Fathers and Suns" (2012), a video recording of Lister is shown advising his "son" watching the video (a near-future version of Lister) that one of the things he should do after getting his life back on track is to "find Krissie", confirming that Kochanski still hasn't been found. In "Entangled" (2012), Lister mentions that he asked the BEGGs if they had seen Kochanski, but they had not. It was originally intended that the final two episodes of Series X would see the reintroduction of Kochanski, but production problems meant that the plan had to be ditched, with replacement stories found at short notice.

=== Novels ===
The backstory with Kochanski is different in the novel Red Dwarf: Infinity Welcomes Careful Drivers (1989). In the book, she seems somewhat more intelligent and witty, is learning Japanese in her spare time, and holds her own against arrogant young officers. Lister has a brief but intense relationship with her, spending most of the time in her quarters having sex and watching It's a Wonderful Life, their favourite movie. Kochanski, however, reveals she is still hooked on her ex-and-future boyfriend Tim, a catering officer. She was dating Lister on the rebound, and goes back to Tim, leaving Lister heartbroken. It is Kochanski's rejection of him that leads Lister to his plan to be caught with his cat Frankenstein and be sent to stasis for the rest of the trip, resulting in Lister being the sole survivor of the radiation leak. At the end of "Better than Life", Lister dies of a heart attack at age 61. He is taken to a universe where time runs backwards, and is reunited with Konchanski, who has also been brought back to life.

Kochanski also appears prominently in the Red Dwarf novel Last Human (1995), written by Doug Naylor. In the novel, following being reunited with Lister as an aged couple in a world where time runs backwards (following the death of Dave Lister in the "real" universe), Kochanski and Lister have entered into a loving relationship with each other. Now part of the Red Dwarf crew, Kochanski is in a clear position of authority as the highest-ranking member of the crew – a fact that Rimmer clearly resents (having been robbed of what minuscule authority he could claim in that position), although the others either appreciate or at least do not mind due to her clear intelligence and competence. The novel ends with Kochanski and Lister, stranded on an idyllic world in an unknown parallel universe, attempting to start a family with help from the Luck virus.

In the novel Backwards, Konchanski and Lister live together as an aged couple on backwards Earth. However, unlike Lister, she fully integrates into the backwards universe and forgets Lister at the "end" of their relationship.

== Casting and development ==
Liverpudlian actress Alexandra Pigg was originally cast in the role of Kochanski, but was unavailable for new recording dates following an electrician's strike, so the part then went to Glaswegian actress and lead singer of the new wave band Altered Images, Clare Grogan. Stage manager Dona DiStefano briefly portrays Kochanski near the end of "Stasis Leak" (1988). In a behind the scenes interview on the Bodysnatcher DVD set, DiStefano says that Clare Grogan had only been scheduled to appear in the pre-recorded scenes and not in the studio scenes. DiStefano has no lines, and her face is mostly obscured by the brim of a hat.

Chloë Annett had auditioned for a role on the second series of The 10%ers. Although she didn't get the part, she was kept in mind when a new actor for Kochanski was sought after for series VII, after "[i]t was felt that Clare Grogan was more of a 'presenter' now, and perhaps wasn't right to play the part as a regular character." According to the official Red Dwarf website, the Red Dwarf movie was "more likely to go ahead" at the time with the introduction of a female character, and Kochanski's inclusion "had been likely to happen" even if Chris Barrie's character of Arnold Rimmer didn't leave Red Dwarf around the same time Annett had joined the show. Annett's portrayal of Kochanski was more explicitly posh.

In the Series 8 episode Pete: Part 1 a young Kochanski was played by Holly Earl.

In the unaired pilot for the American version of Red Dwarf, Christine Kochanski was played by Elizabeth Morehead.
