= Holly (Red Dwarf) =

Fictional character in Red Dwarf

- Red Dwarf character
- Norman Lovett as Holly (Series I-II, VII-VIII, XII) Hattie Hayridge as Holly (Series III–V).
- First appearance: "The End" (1988)
- Last appearance: "Red Dwarf: The Promised Land" (2020)
- Portrayed by: Norman Lovett; Hattie Hayridge

Holly is a fictional character in the science fiction situation comedy Red Dwarf. The character, who is the eponymous spaceship's onboard computer, has been played by Norman Lovett (Series I–II, VII–VIII, XII, The Promised Land) and Hattie Hayridge (Series III–V).

== Actors ==
Red Dwarf, written by Rob Grant and Doug Naylor, was first televised in 1988, and was an iteration of Grant and Naylor's "Dave Hollins – Space Cadet", which was a regular segment on the BBC Radio 4 show Son of Cliché. In the radio version, Hollins was the last surviving human and had only the computer Hab, played by Chris Barrie, for company. For the television series, Hollins was renamed as Dave Lister, Hab was renamed as Holly, and the cast was expanded. In the script for the pilot episode, Holly was female, but when Norman Lovett, a man, auditioned for the role of Arnold Rimmer, he was instead offered the role of Holly and accepted it. The role was to have been only as a voiceover, but at Lovett's suggestion, Holly's face appeared on screen.

The character was played by Lovett in Series I and II. In series III the character had a "head sex change" and was played by Hattie Hayridge from Series III–V. Holly did not appear in Series VI, but reappeared in the Series VII finale as the original male version, again played by Lovett. The male version of Holly appeared throughout Series VIII, but does not appear in Back to Earth, Series X, or Series XI. Lovett reprised the role for the final episode of Series XII and again in an extended special episode, The Promised Land, in 2020. Doug Naylor also revealed on Twitter that Lovett's return was permanent for any future series or specials.

In the unaired pilot for the American version of Red Dwarf, Holly was played by Jane Leeves.

== Name ==
Holly's name follows a convention sometimes used in Red Dwarf of computers being named after their abilities. In Holly's case it reflects them being a "Tenth Generation AI Hologrammatic Computer", capable of generating holograms. (In later episodes, Stocky would be introduced as a computer with stochastic abilities, and Pree as a computer with predictive abilities.) The name is at the same time a parodic allusion to HAL 9000 supercomputer from Kubrick's 2001: A Space Odyssey.

== Appearance ==
Holly is an "intelligent" computer. Holly's user interface appears on ship screens as a disembodied human head on a black background, and can also be downloaded into a watch worn by Lister, Kryten's chest display, and on a motorcycle speedometer when the crew visited Waxworld. In Series I his face appears pixelated on a blue background, but this idea was dropped from Series II. As a male, Holly initially appears to be approximately 50 years old and has receding brown hair.

After meeting his female counterpart, Hilly, in the series II episode "Parallel Universe", Holly adopted Hilly's likeness due to falling in love with Hilly and adopting her persona. This was explained in a tongue-in-cheek text crawl shown at the beginning of the broadcast version of the first episode of Series III ("Backwards"), to explain away changes to the ship, crew, and other details.

In reality, the switch from Norman Lovett to Hattie Hayridge as Holly came down to practical and production decisions. Norman Lovett left the show after Series II due to dissatisfaction with how production was handled. Hattie Hayridge, who had already appeared as Hilly in the "Parallel Universe" episode, was brought on as the new Holly.

In series VII–VIII, the upgraded male version of Holly appears to be around 60 years old with receding grey hair and a bald patch.

In "Skipper", the final episode of Series XII, Holly re-appears in a brief appearance when Rimmer travels to a point in time where the crew are about to be killed by the radiation leak as demonstrated in "The End". He appears to be approximately 70 years old, has less hair than his previous appearances and that hair has become more grey.

== Character ==
After releasing Dave Lister from stasis in "The End", Holly told him that the crew have been wiped out by a radiation leak and that he had spent three million years in stasis. Holly prides himself on the fact he had an IQ of 6,000, but after three million years by himself, he had become computer senile, or as Holly put it, "a bit peculiar". The crew often ridicule Holly on his senility, but Holly often comes out on top. He often plays practical jokes on the crew, such as fooling Lister into thinking that NORWEB Federation space fighters were after him and wanted £180 billion in arrears for leaving his bathroom light on three million years ago, as well as wanting to arrest him for "Crimes against Humanity" as he had left some mouldy German sausages alone in his apartment for three million years and now the mould covered 7/8 of the Earth's surface. This love of practical jokes culminated in his generating an alternate personality, Queeg, and passing him off as the ship's backup computer which was seizing control of the ship; Holly's Queeg persona is portrayed by Charles Augins in the episode.

Among his achievements was the invention of Hol Rock, where he decimalised music (having ten notes instead of eight, writing an A–Z guide to the universe and reading every book in existence (concluding that the worst was Football: It's a Funny Old Game by Kevin Keegan).

He was friends with another computer called Gordon, who had an IQ of 8,000 and was an Eleventh Generation AI hologrammatic computer. Gordon resembled Holly in that he was represented as a balding middle-aged man. Despite having a higher IQ than Holly, Gordon showed a lesser understanding of technology than Holly. One of the more worrying aspects of Holly's senility is that he has developed a blind spot for the number 7. When he invents the Holly Hop Drive, he claims that one mistake in his 13 billion calculations and they would be blown up. He then misses the seven in his countdown, possibly the cause of the error that sent them to the parallel universe.

Holly runs most of Red Dwarf's systems, although in several episodes such as "Quarantine", Holly is shown to not have complete control of Red Dwarf, and in Holly's absence in Series VI and VII, a computer is mentioned by the crew, and is seen to control autopilot.

Holly was lost for some time, along with the ship, which had been stolen by Kryten's nanobots. He was found on a planet made of junk from Red Dwarf, having reverted to his original male form, and was downloaded into Lister's Holly-watch. When the nanobots rebuilt the ship, there were two versions of Holly: the original, who usually remains in the watch, and a rebuilt version who had not suffered the effects of three million years alone. The non-senile version only appeared in one episode, "Back in the Red, Part III", and was distinguished by having an enormous forehead shaped like an egg. The original Holly then states that he was responsible for re-engineering the Nanobots to resurrect the dead crew, all for the purposes of distracting Lister from going insane.

In Back to Earth it is revealed that sometime after the events of "Only The Good..." Holly is offline due to water damage, later elaborated as being the result of Lister leaving a bath running in the officers' quarters for nine years and the water subsequently flooding the ship.

Kryten briefly mentions Holly in the series X episode "Fathers and Suns", saying that the crew "miss" him before installing Pree, another computer.

Holly made a return appearance in the final episode of Series XII ("Skipper"), once again played by Lovett. This version of Holly was still senile but located in an alternate universe which Rimmer enters, set just before the crew are wiped out by the radiation leak.

In The Promised Land, Lister discovers Holly's back-up personality disc and uses it to reactivate him, but the "new" Holly, although once again smart, begins steps to destroy the ship as he concludes it is no longer fulfilling a worthwhile function for the company. Temporarily retreating to Starbug, the crew are eventually able to trick the new Holly into downloading the experiences of the original from the Red Dwarf archives, which restores his senility but also his old personality, prompting him to help them reclaim the ship from the rogue Cats.

Author Tom Powers argued that for the women in Red Dwarf such as the female version of Holly and parallel universe character Kristine Kochanski, "their character development and heroic narratives are often subverted to support the primary stories of the male Dwarfers".
