= Mac McDonald =

American actor (born 1949)

- Born: Terence McDonald; June 18, 1949 (age 77); Long Island, New York, U.S.
- Occupation: Actor
- Known for: Red Dwarf

Mac McDonald (born Terence McDonald; June 18, 1949) is an American actor. He is known for playing Captain Hollister on the BBC TV series Red Dwarf and frequently plays American characters in other British TV shows. He has also had many movie roles in films such as Aliens, Batman and The Fifth Element, all of which were filmed in London.

== Life and career ==
McDonald was born on Long Island, New York. After leaving school, McDonald pursued a stage career, with a preference for comedy and music. In 1968, he was in Shreveport, Louisiana as the local TV station's Bozo the Clown. Later he moved to San Francisco, working as a cycle courier and joining the AAA Acting Company.

He developed an interest in the teachings of George Gurdjieff but in 1974 turned down an invitation to attend the movement's training school, deciding instead to travel in Europe, armed only with a fool's hat and a melodica. In Amsterdam, he met a fellow American and accepted an invitation to stay in a commune in Kentish Town, North London. There he stayed for some years, taking over a leatherworking business from another departing American and running a leather goods stall in the newly opened Camden Lock Market.

There he hit upon a novel idea for busking, the "Human Jukebox", in which he waited in a large silver box until, when prompted by the insertion of a coin and the selection of a song, he opened a window and delivered his (unaccompanied) rendering. This was quite a success since McDonald's tenor voice was reinforced by a showbizzy, faux-sincere personality that was by turns endearing, ironical and corny. As the "Human Jukebox", he made his first UK TV appearance, standing in for Elton John's part with Kiki Dee in the hit duet "Don't Go Breaking My Heart".

At about this time, McDonald joined another company, this time presenting children's shows in conjunction with the Inner London Education Authority. In 1982, he and another member, Hilary, left to form a three-person musical comedy troupe, The Cheap Shots, with McDonald's close friend Sakal providing the music. The threesome developed "The Chip Shop Show", a series of spoof musicals popular on the newly burgeoning London alternative comedy circuit, making many appearances at London's The Comedy Store alongside Ronnie Golden, John Hegley and others, including several future Red Dwarf players.

This format led to further TV work and McDonald acquired an agent, bringing appearances in TV commercials and other parts requiring an American. After a few minor film roles, his appearance in Red Dwarf raised his profile and brought more and better roles.

== Filmography ==
=== Film ===
- Rollerball (1975) – Executive (uncredited)
- Star Wars: Episode V – The Empire Strikes Back (1980) – Rebel Pilot (uncredited)
- Top Secret! (1984) – German Soldier
- Electric Dreams (1984) – Removal Man
- Death Wish 3 (1985) – Police Detective
- Aliens (1986) – Commander Simpson (extended version only)
- Superman IV: The Quest for Peace (1987) – Prison Guard
- Batman (1989) – Goon I
- Nightbreed (1990) – Lou Rickman
- Memphis Belle (1990) – Les
- The Russia House (1990) – Bob
- Hardware (1990) – Newsreader
- There's No Business... (1994) – Mort Clayton, manufacturer of "Pinkies" kitchen gloves
- Fierce Creatures (1997)
- The Fifth Element (1997) – Skycop
- Stiff Upper Lips (1998)
- The Barber of Siberia (1998) – Sergeant "Mad Dog" O'Leary
- The 51st State (2001) – Harley Davidson
- Control (2004)
- Tara Road (2005) – Jerry
- Flyboys (2006) – Sheriff Detweiler
- Transsiberian (2008) – Minister Miller
- The Descent Part 2 (2009) – Mayor O'Reilly
- Wrong Turn 3: Left for Dead (2009) – Warden Ladew
- Tad, The Lost Explorer (2012) - Professor Humbert, Professor Lavrof

=== TV ===
- Red Dwarf – Captain Frank Hollister (1988, 1999, 2017)
- The New Statesman – Sheriff (Series 2, Episode 5, "California Here I Come", 1989)
- French and Saunders (1990)
- Jeeves and Wooster – "Birdsberger" (Series 3, 1992)
- The Young Indiana Jones Chronicles – "Young Indiana Jones and the Phantom Train of Doom" (June 5, 1993)
- The Tomorrow People – "Twitch" (Series 2, 1994)
- Glam Metal Detectives - Rolston Brocade (Episode 1 "One of Us is a Robot", 1995)
- Oh, Doctor Beeching! – Joe (Series 2, Episode 6 "Love is a Very Splendid Thing", 1997)
- The Man Who Made Husbands Jealous – Elmer Winterton (1997)
- Hustle (TV series, Season 1, Episode 6,) – American on plane (2004)
- Black Books – American tourist (2004)
- My Family – Scott Taylor (Series 2, Episode 11, "The Last Supper", 2001)
- Spooks – "Hard-Faced Man" (CIA Agent) (Season 2, Episode 10, "Smoke & Mirrors", 2003)
- Little Britain Abroad – "Phil" (2006)
- Shakespeare & Hathaway: Private Investigators – Martin Mariner (2018)

=== Music videos ===
- Park ranger in New Order's "60 Miles an Hour" (2001)
- Sneaker Pimps' "Post-Modern Sleaze" (1996)

=== Video games ===
- Sonic & Sega All-Stars Racing – Announcer (2010)
