= Danny John-Jules =

British actor (born 1960)

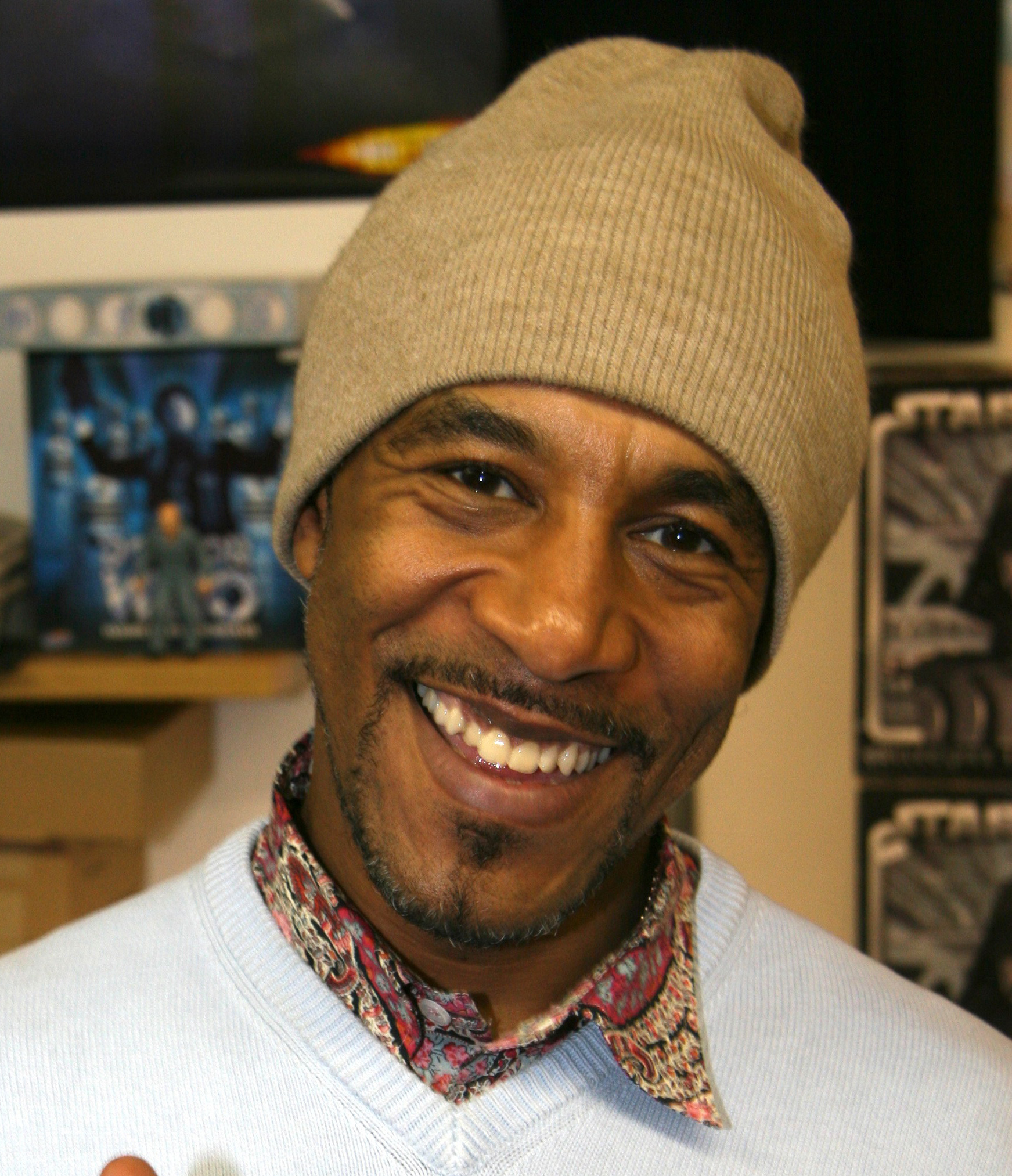
- John-Jules in 2008
- Born: Daniel John-Jules; 16 September 1960 (age 66); Paddington, London, England
- Education: Rutherford School, Paddington
- Occupations: Actor; dancer
- Years active: 1975–present
- Spouse: Petula Langlais
- Children: 2
- Relatives: Tyreece John-Jules (nephew)

Daniel John-Jules (born 16 September 1960) is a British actor. He is best known for playing Cat in the sci-fi comedy series Red Dwarf, Barrington in the comic children's series Maid Marian and Her Merry Men, and policeman Dwayne Myers in the crime drama Death in Paradise. He was also a protagonist in the hit CBBC children's spy drama M.I. High, in which he portrayed Lenny Bicknall, the caretaker.

== Early life ==
John-Jules was born in St Mary's Hospital, Paddington, London, brought up in Notting Hill and from 1972 to 1977 attended Rutherford School, where he learnt gymnastics.

Both his parents are from Dominica, and arrived in the UK aboard HMT Empire Windrush. His mother worked in the courts; he has a brother who is a barrister.

== Career ==
Before his television and film work, he was a dancer in a group called Second Generation and in many productions in West End theatres. He was a member of the original cast of Starlight Express, playing a boxcar called Rocky I. In 1993, he released a song from Red Dwarf, "Tongue Tied", as a single, which entered the top 20, eventually reaching a high of 17. John-Jules featured his Red Dwarf co-stars and backing singers in the video. For this release, he was billed as simply "The Cat"; a CD-EP release was also issued featuring this song along with a version of the Red Dwarf theme song.

Among other productions, John-Jules was the dancer from the crowd in the Wham! video for "The Edge of Heaven". He gets up partway through the instrumental section and dances alongside George Michael. John-Jules also danced on the Lena Zavaroni TV series in 1981, and has made a tribute to her on her website.

On television, John-Jules is best known for his portrayal of Cat and Cat's geeky alter ego Dwayne Dibbley in the British comedy series Red Dwarf. He got the part of Cat by turning up half an hour late for his audition, dressed in his father's old zoot suit. He was unaware that he was late and hence did not appear at all concerned about it. The producers immediately decided he was cool enough to be "the Cat". Craig Charles said at a Red Dwarf convention that John-Jules was a lot like the Cat in that he had a lot of clothes. He said: "Danny John-Jules could change his clothes every four seconds for a year and he still wouldn't run out of clothes." Along with Charles, John-Jules is the only other cast member to appear in every episode of Red Dwarf to date.

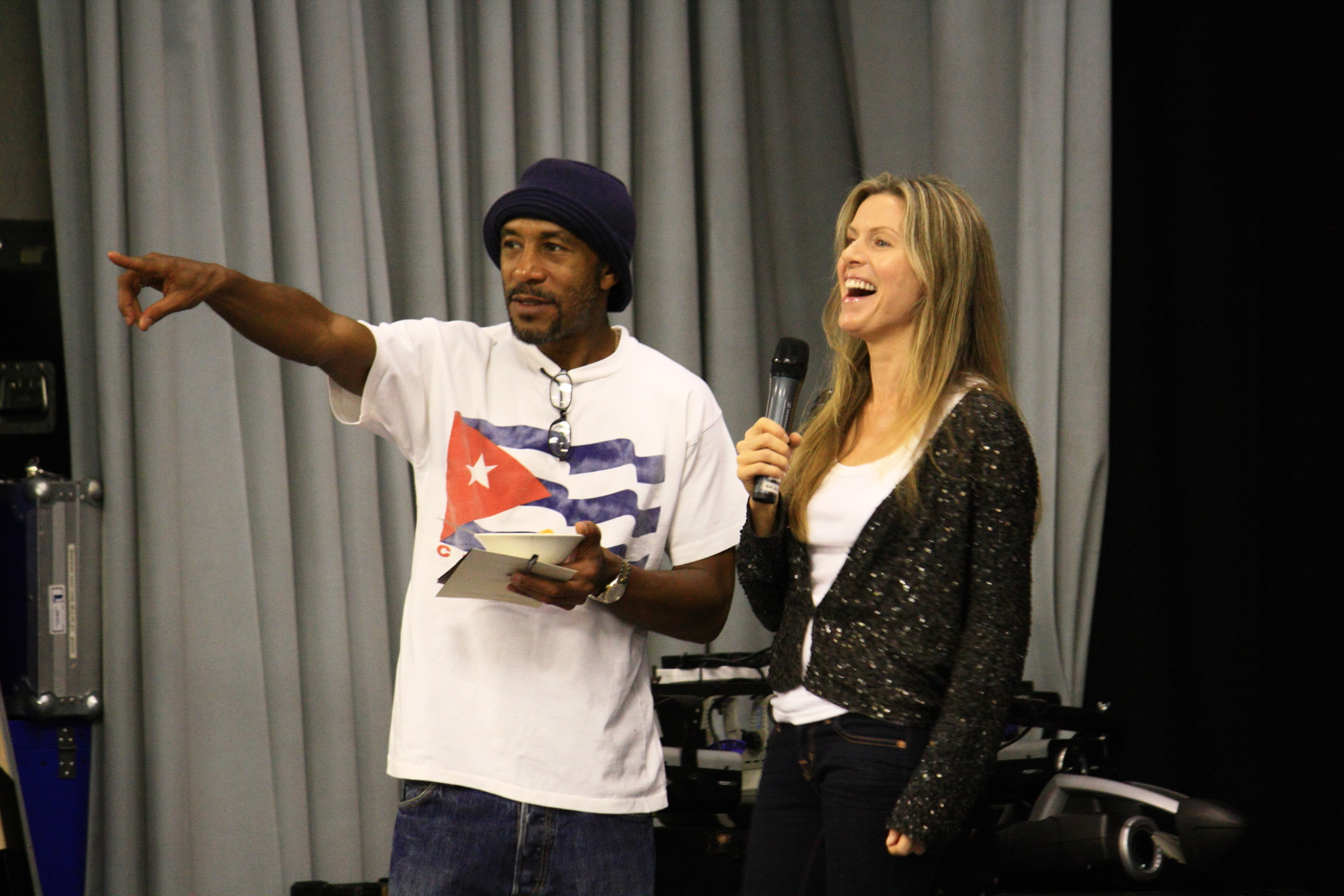
John-Jules and Chloë Annett aka Kristine Kochanski from Red Dwarf in 2009

Following the death of Red Dwarf co-creator Rob Grant in February 2026, John-Jules contributed a tribute to the programme's official website, recalling spending time with Grant at Prague Comic Con shortly before his death.

His first acknowledged television and film roles were in Roy Minton's critically acclaimed Scum, in which he played one of the inmates. The TV version, which was part of the Play for Today strand, was banned prior to broadcast.

He has also played the parts of Barrington in Maid Marian and Her Merry Men, Byron Lucifer in The Tomorrow People, and Milton Wordsworth, the original presenter of The Story Makers on CBeebies.

Since 1999, John-Jules has had several guest appearances as himself in shows such as Comedy Connections, RI:SE and Night Fever.

Between 2002 and 2004, he played Milton Wordsworth in the CBeebies series The Story Makers, an educational children's television programme that was broadcast for four series. He appears in every series except the second.

He has also appeared in at least one episode of CBBC's sitcom Kerching!, playing Michael's father, Trevor, and appeared as Lenny Bicknall in series 1 and 2 of M.I. High, also on CBBC. He has also appeared in The Crouches.

On 8 November 2009, he made a brief appearance during BBC Two's coverage of the 2009 Valencian Moto Grand Prix.

In 2014, he played Nile Rogers in The Life of Rock with Brian Pern. In May 2015, it was announced that he would, again, be returning to Red Dwarf for the eleventh and twelfth series.

In 2004, Jules played a character on the SF comedy Starhyke, but the series remained in post-production for five years, being shown only privately in 2009, the rights finally being bought by Amazon.com in 2015 and released in 2016.

He appeared in the BBC One series Death in Paradise as policeman Dwayne Myers from its start until 2018. He returned as a guest star for the Christmas special in 2021, and for several episodes in 2024.

It was announced that John-Jules would play the lead as Sir Leigh Teabing in the stage version of hit novel The Da Vinci Code's 2022 UK tour.

=== Film ===
John-Jules's film career began in 1975 playing Frog in the short film Seven Green Bottles, which was produced in conjunction with the Metropolitan Police and warned of the dangers and consequences of juvenile crime. He supplied the voice for two characters in Labyrinth (1986), then appeared in the 1986 version of Little Shop of Horrors, Lock, Stock and Two Smoking Barrels (1998), and Blade II (2002). He also appeared, uncredited, in the 1979 British film Scum, playing a look-out during a fight scene.

He has appeared in the 2008 British films The Grind and Sucker Punch. He has a small role as Rachel Weisz's manager in the Lincoln, Nebraska, police force in the 2010 film The Whistleblower.

John-Jules also played one of the dancers in the 1981 movie The Great Muppet Caper, which, like Little Shop of Horrors, was directed by Frank Oz. He is among the dancers in the restaurant where Kermit and Miss Piggy are dancing.

=== Other work ===
John-Jules provided his voice for the character of Gex in the UK and European release of Gex 3: Deep Cover Gecko. For several years in the late 1990s he appeared in the annual Christmas pantomime at Aldershot's Princes Hall theatre, playing his Cat character. John-Jules has also provided voices for the British Canadian animated series Chop Socky Chooks for Cartoon Network, Teletoon and Aardman Animations and the 2015 remake of the British children's animated series Bob the Builder.

John-Jules participated in the 16th series of Strictly Come Dancing, partnered with professional dancer Amy Dowden. In week 5, he topped the leaderboard with a total of 37 points for his jive. The couple were awarded the first 10 score of the series when Darcey Bussell marked their Jive to "Flip, Flop and Fly" in week 5. The couple were eliminated in Week 8 after losing a dance off to Graeme Swann and Oti Mabuse; their elimination came days after controversial bullying allegations, with tabloids reporting that John-Jules had reduced Dowden to tears.

John-Jules has campaigned to raise awareness of prostate cancer, particularly among black men. In 2017, he became one of the public figures fronting Prostate Cancer UK's Stronger Knowing More campaign. His work with the charity has included appearing in The Real Full Monty and taking part in motorcycle trips intended to raise awareness of the disease.

== Personal life ==
John-Jules is married to Petula Langlais; the couple have two children, both of whom have had minor acting roles alongside their father. He is also an avid motorcyclist and regularly participates in charity rides.

His nephew is Tyreece John-Jules, a Kilmarnock and former Arsenal footballer.

In November 2008, John-Jules was convicted of assaulting two bin men. He was ordered to perform 120 hours of community service. After the court hearing, John-Jules maintained he had a "clear conscience", saying: "I've been doing community service for over 30 years; this is just another day."

== Filmography ==
=== Film ===
| Year | Title | Role | Notes |
|---|---|---|---|
| 1975 | Seven Green Bottles | Frog | Short film |
| 1979 | Scum | Baldy's Lookout | Uncredited role |
| 1981 | The Great Muppet Caper | Street Dancer | Uncredited role |
| 1986 | Labyrinth | Firey 3 & Firey 4 (voice) | |
| 1986 | Little Shop of Horrors | Doo-Wop Street Singer | |
| 1991 | London Kills Me | Black Man at Party | |
| 1998 | Lock, Stock and Two Smoking Barrels | Barfly Jack | |
| 1999 | Let the Good Times Roll | Neville | Short film |
| 2002 | Blade II | Asad | |
| 2002 | Sleep | Paul | Short film |
| 2002 | The Meeting | The Teacher | Short film |
| 2003 | The Video Tape | Off Licence Owner | Short film |
| 2006 | A Goat's Tail | Member of Parliament | |
| 2007 | Fallen Angels | Wife Beater | Short film |
| 2007 | Underground | Lamont Gaines | |
| 2008 | Sucker Punch | Harley | |
| 2010 | Freestyle | Collis | |
| 2010 | The Whistleblower | Duke | |
| 2011 | Arthur Christmas | Elf (voice) | |
| 2012 | Swap | Peter | Short film |
| 2012 | The Grind | Phil | |
| 2013 | Voodoo Magic | Wyclef | |
| 2016 | Bucky | Wayne | Short film; also writer, director & producer |
| 2017 | Amoc | Dr. Stevens | |
| 2021 | Creation Stories | Maurice | |
| 2025 | Sound Asleep | Deen Peels | Short film |

=== Television ===
| Year | Title | Role | Notes |
|---|---|---|---|
| 1983–1984 | The Hot Shoe Show | Himself - Dancer | Unknown episodes |
| 1984 | Danger: Marmalade at Work | Roy Lee | Episode: "Shame" |
| 1988–2020 | Red Dwarf | Cat / Duane Dibbley | 74 episodes |
| 1989–1994 | Maid Marian and Her Merry Men | Barrington | 26 episodes |
| 1991 | Jackanory | Storyteller | Episode: "Surprises" |
| 1991 | Spatz | Captain Electric | Episode: "Loot" |
| 1991 | Scum | Bit Part | Television film. Uncredited role |
| 1992 | Runaway Bay | Lord Frittas | Episode: "Taking the Rap" |
| 1992 | In Dreams | Gary | Television film |
| 1993 | Comic Relief: The Invasion of the Comic Tomatoes | The Cat | Television Special |
| 1994 | The Bill | Andy Brown | Episode: "Backlash" |
| 1995 | The Tomorrow People | Byron Lucifer | 5 episodes: "The Living Stones: Parts 1–5" |
| 1996 | The Demon Headmaster | Eddy Hair | 2 episodes |
| 1998 | Can't Smeg Won't Smeg | Duane Dibbley / Cat | Television film |
| 2002–2004 | The Story Makers | Milton Wordsworth | 74 episodes |
| 2003–2005 | The Crouches | Ed | 11 episodes |
| 2004 | Casualty | Leon | 2 episodes: "Emotional Rescue: Parts 1 & 2" |
| 2006 | Doctors | Bradley Patterson | Episode: "Junk Soul Brothers" |
| 2007 | Chute! | Lenny Bicknall | Episode #1.12 |
| 2007–2008 | Chop Socky Chooks | (voice role) | 17 episodes |
| 2007–2008 | M.I. High | Lenny Bicknall | 23 episodes |
| 2009 | Starhyke | Admiral Lenovo | Episode: "Disordered" |
| 2011–2018, 2021, 2024 | Death in Paradise | Officer Dwayne Myers | 61 episodes |
| 2014 | The Life of Rock with Brian Pern | Nile Rodgers | Episode: "Middle Age of Rock" |
| 2015 | Top Coppers | Captain Woods | Episode: "The Passion of the Chris" |
| 2015–2018 | Bob the Builder | Curtis (voice) | 21 episodes. UK/US versions |
| 2016 | Drunk History: UK | Angel Gabriel | Episode: "Christmas Special" |
| 2017 | Urban Myths | Don King | Episode: "The Greatest. Of All Time." |
| 2017 | Tim Vine Travels Through Time Christmas Special | Cardinal Wolsey | Television film |
| 2018–2022 | Robozuna | Niven & Spark (voice) | Episode: "Game Changer Part II". UK/US versions |
| 2022 | Shakespeare & Hathaway: Private Investigators | Ben Lovedon | Episode: "If Music Be the Food of Love" |
| 2022 | Dodger | Mr. Rossini | Episode: "Carnival" |
| 2023 | The Kemps: All Gold | Paul Human | Television Special |
| 2026 | Ann Droid | Brian | 3 episodes |

=== Video games ===
| Year | Title | Role | Notes |
|---|---|---|---|
| 1999 | Gex 3: Deep Cover Gecko | Gex | UK and European release |
