= Chloë Annett =

English actress

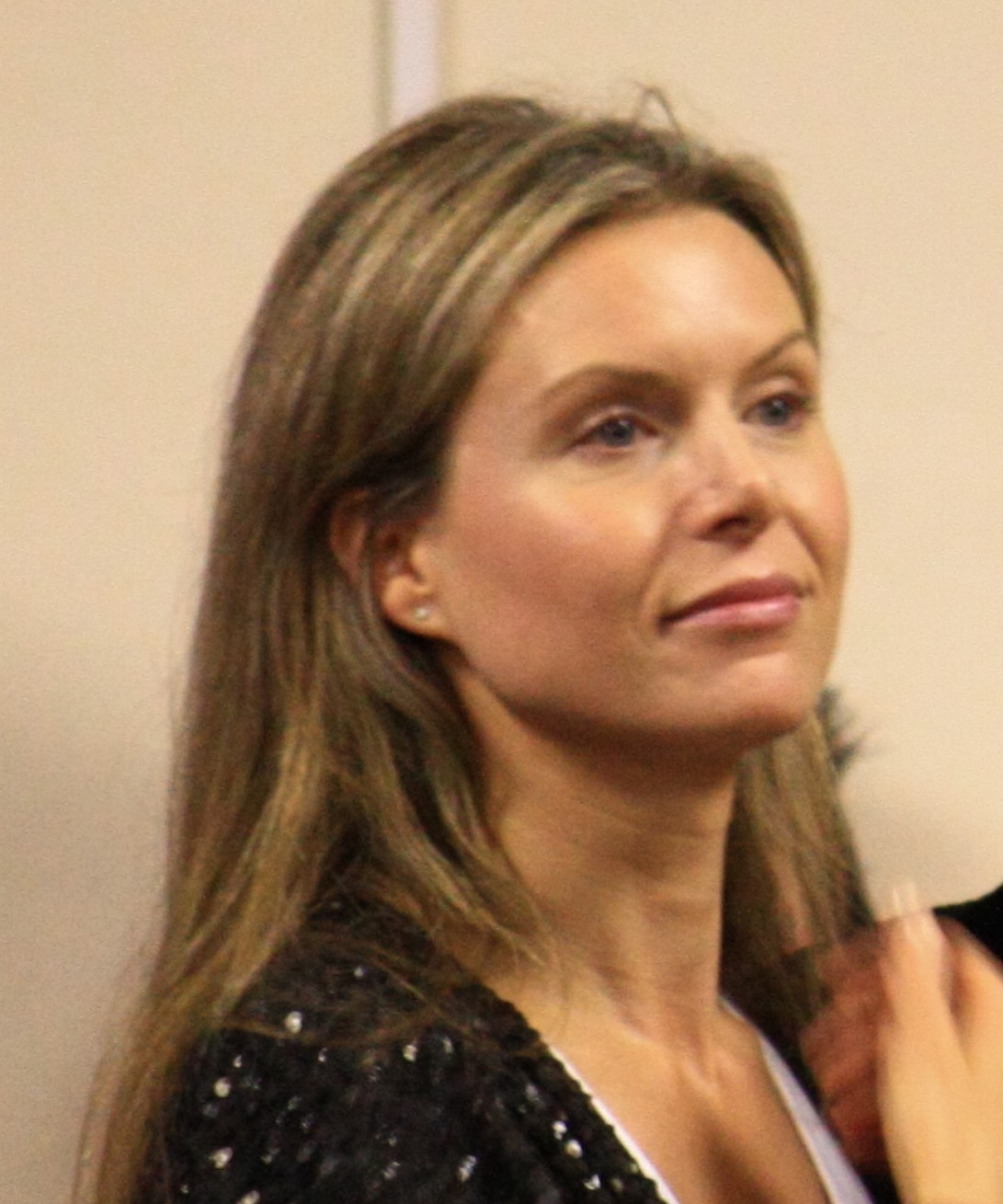
- Annett in 2009
- Born: London, England
- Years active: 1990–present
- Known for: Red Dwarf; Crime Traveller

Chloë Victoria Annett is an English actress. She played Holly Turner in Crime Traveller and Kristine Kochanski in series 7, 8 and Back to Earth TV special of the sitcom Red Dwarf.

== Biography ==
=== Early life and family ===
Annett was born 25 July 1971, and brought up in East Finchley in London, where she attended Mountview Theatre School.

Her father was director Paul Annett, who directed a large number of episodes of the soap opera EastEnders. Annett's father also directed some episodes of children's drama series Byker Grove, in some of which Annett appeared. Her brother, Jamie Annett, has also directed EastEnders. Her mother is actress and voice expert Margo Annett, author of An Actor's Guide to Auditions and Interviews, who works closely with Thelma Holt and the Cameron Mackintosh foundation.

=== Television ===
Annett has spent time in America, where she had a part in the 1992 TV miniseries Jewels. Back in Britain, most of her roles were bit parts, although she played the starring role of Holly Turner in Crime Traveller, in 1997 alongside Michael French, who played Jeff Slade. In 1992, she played the part of Gertrude Winkworth in one episode of the Granada's series Jeeves and Wooster, based on the novels of P.G. Wodehouse, in which Hugh Laurie and Stephen Fry starred. She also played Angela Mortimer, the great-niece of Mrs Pumphrey and the love interest of Tristan Farnon, in one episode ("Hampered") of All Creatures Great and Small.

Annett played Kristine Kochanski in the seventh and eighth series of the science fiction comedy television series Red Dwarf, a role which she reprised in the final part of the 2009 special, Red Dwarf: Back to Earth.

She won Best Actress at the April 2011 London Independent Film Festival.

== Selected filmography ==
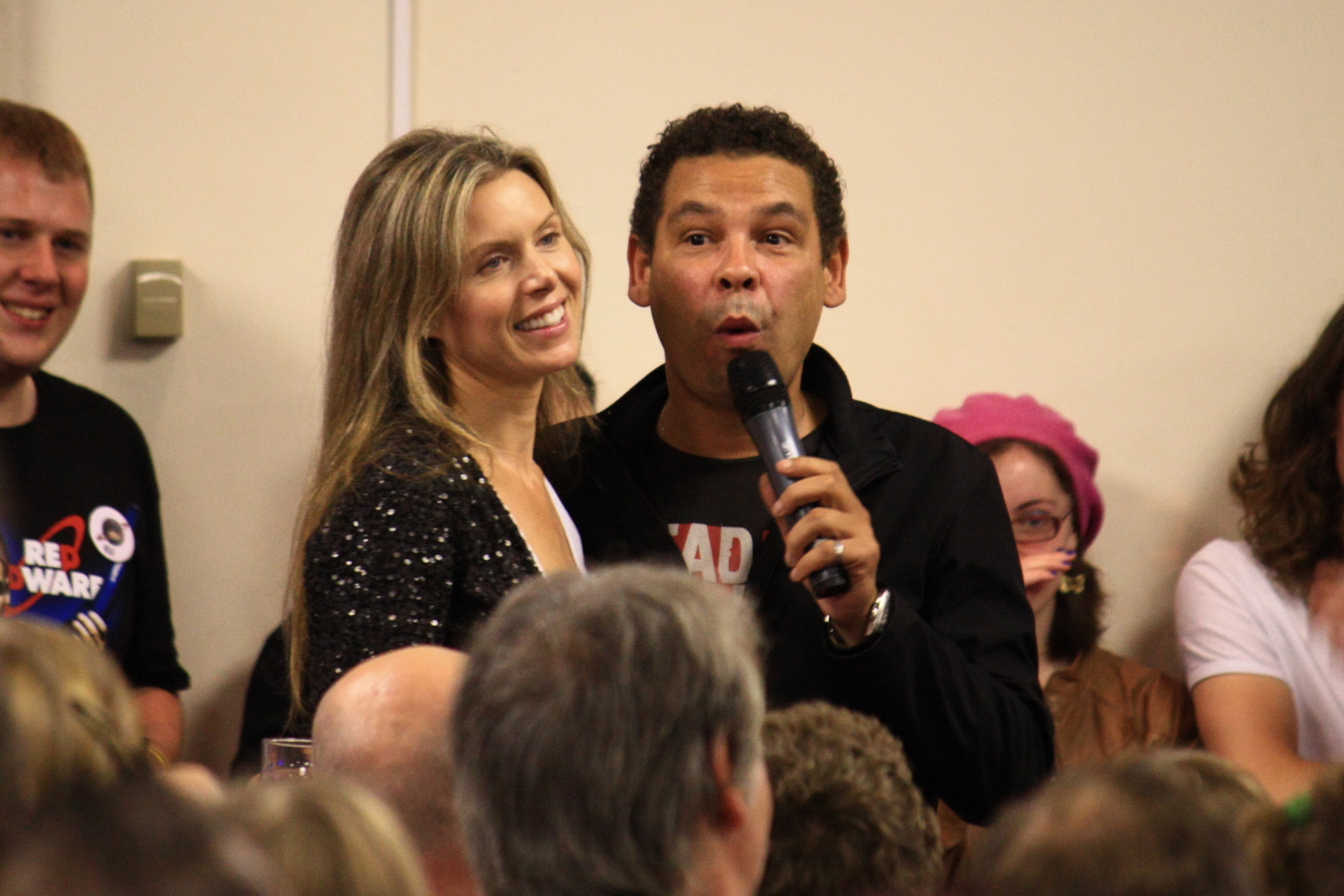
Annett and Craig Charles, who plays Dave Lister in Red Dwarf

| Year | Title | Role | Notes |
|---|---|---|---|
| 1990 | Families | Mina Sandaval | |
| 1990 | Inspector Wexford: An Unkindness of Ravens | Jane Gardner | |
| 1990 | All Creatures Great and Small: Hampered | Angela Mortimer | |
| 1991 | Doctor at the Top | Rebecca Stuart-Clark | |
| 1992 | Spatz | Donna Edwards | |
| 1992 | Jeeves and Wooster: Bertie Takes Gussie's Place at Deverill Hall | Gertrude Winkworth | |
| 1992 | Covington Cross: The Persecution | Rachel | |
| 1992 | Double X: The Name of the Game | Sarah Clutten | |
| 1992 | Jewels (aka Danielle Steel's Jewels) | Isabelle | |
| 1993 | Yamada ga machi ni yatte kita (aka How to Speak Japanese) | Mary Fitzgibbon | |
| 1994 | Byker Grove | Janey | |
| 1996 | Cadfael: The Devil's Novice | Rosanna | |
| 1997 | Space Cadets: Vulcans vs. Klingons | Herself | |
| 1997 | Crime Traveller | Holly Turner | Series regular |
| 1997 | Red Dwarf VII | Kristine Kochanski | 6 episodes |
| 1998 | Can't Smeg Won't Smeg | Kristine Kochanski | |
| 1998 | Universe Challenge | Herself | |
| 1998 | Red Dwarf A-Z | Herself | |
| 1999 | Red Dwarf VIII | Kristine Kochanski | Series regular |
| 2000 | Kiss Me Kate | Sam | Episode: The Party |
| 2000 | Pasty Faces | Lena | |
| 2000 | The Asylum | Rose | |
| 2002 | Doctors | Joanna Hepworth | Episode: Stealing Booty |
| 2004 | Casualty | Lina Roles | Episode: Passions and Convictions |
| 2004 | Comedy Connections: Red Dwarf | Herself | |
| 2009 | Red Dwarf: Back to Earth | Herself/Kristine Kochanski | |
| 2010 | Leila | Leila | |
| 2012 | Casualty | April Halliwell | Episode: Hero Syndrome |
| 2014 | Holby City | Pat Lang | Episode: No Apologies |
