= List of Wheeler Dealers episodes =

Wheeler Dealers is a British television series. In each episode the presenters save an old and repairable vehicle, by repairing or otherwise improving it within a budget, then selling it to a new owner. The show is fronted by Mike Brewer, with mechanics Edd China (series 1–13), Ant Anstead (series 14–16) and Marc Priestley (series 17 onward).

This is a list of Wheeler Dealers episodes with original airdate on Discovery Channel.

== Series overview ==
Series	Episodes	Originally released	
Series	Episodes	First released	Last released
1	12	7 October 2003	11 November 2003
2	12	10 August 2004	16 September 2004
3	12	23 August 2005	27 September 2005
4	12	29 August 2006	3 October 2006
5	12	28 October 2008	6 December 2008
6	20	5 May 2009	17 November 2009
7	10	4 May 2010	9 November 2010
8	10	5 April 2011	1 November 2011
9	15	20 March 2012	6 November 2012
10	12	19 February 2013	22 October 2013
11	14	17 March 2014	13 October 2014
12	18	23 March 2015	19 October 2015
13	16	9 May 2016	16 January 2017
14	16	5 October 2017	31 May 2018
15	24	3 October 2018	3 December 2019
16	14	31 August 2020	22 February 2021
17	20	30 August 2021	14 November 2022
18	20	20 March 2023	25 December 2023

== Episodes ==
=== Series 1 (2003) ===
No. overall	No. in series	Vehicle	Budget	Purchase price	Final cost after restoration	Final selling price	Profit/loss	Original release date
1	1–2	1983 Porsche 924	£1,000	£700	£1,010	£1,500	+£490	7 October 2003
Work Completed: Replaced gear knob, passenger door and door mirrors, pulled and filled dent in rear nearside quarter panel, repainted wheels and replaced the centre caps, applied new door sill decals, replaced handbrake lever, replaced handbrake warning light, adjusted rear exhaust section to prevent it from knocking against the undercarriage, fitted a new stereo, engine service including replacing the engine oil, spark plugs, rotor arm, distributor cap and air filter, cleaned up the leather interior, polished the bodywork. Notes: Before Mike sold the car, he gave a mini-primer on how to sell cars to maximise profits.
2	3–4	1985 Saab 900 Turbo	£1,000	£600	£1,035	£1,200	+£165	14 October 2003
Work Completed: Replaced interior (including carpets and door cards) from beige cloth to black/grey leather, front and rear brake discs and pads replaced, replaced both electric window motors and exhaust back box, replaced front indicator lenses with clear ones with orange bulbs; engine service performed. Notes: Bought/sold using the Internet. Original beige knee roll repainted grey due to the replacement being damaged beyond repair.
3	5–6	1983 Volkswagen Golf GTI Mk1	£1,000	£650	£1,165	£1,550	+£385	21 October 2003
Work Completed: Refurbished the gear linkage, fitted a new brake master cylinder, 2 new interior air vents, new decals around the rear windscreen and on the door sills, new clock, ammeter and rev counter, new front spoiler, repainted the front VW badge from silver to black, repainted GTI-spec front grille insert from chrome to red and replaced the non original steel wheels with a refurbished set of Pirelli alloys. Notes: Restored to original GTI specification.
4	7–8	1967 Austin Mini Mk1	£1,000	£300	£1,100	£1,300	+£200	28 October 2003
Work Completed: Numerous rust areas treated and repaired (including replacing the nearside A-frame and correctly filling and repairing a dent in the passenger door) before stripping and prepping the car for a full body respray, fitted new chrome brightwork including the bumpers, fitted a new boot lid, fitted new door mirrors, cleaned and repainted the engine and replaced the HT leads. Notes: Flagged as totally original even though it had a sunroof.
5	9–10	1984 Mercedes-Benz 230E W123	£1,000	£400	£976.50	£1,500	+£523.50	4 November 2003
Work Completed: Replaced the steering box, fitted a new windscreen, replaced and repainted the offside front wing, new fuse for sunroof motor, replaced the windscreen wipers, replaced the front bumper irons and serviced the engine (including replacing the fan belt, adjusting the timing, replacing the automatic transmission fluid and replacing the power steering fluid). Notes: Car was found through an advertisement on a bulletin board at a local supermarket. The replacement wing was resprayed free of charge.
6	11–12	1986 Ford Capri Laser 1.6	£1,000	£400	£945	£700	-£245	11 November 2003
Work Completed: Replaced and resprayed the front wings, fitted new "Laser" stickers to the wings, replaced both front suspension bushes, both front tyres, all 4 exhaust gaskets, front bumper & valance and front fog lights. Notes: Sold at a loss; blamed on lacklustre finish of repainted wings, as well as the worn seats that were not addressed during the restoration.
-	-	Final totals	£6,000	£3,050	£6,232	£7,750	£1,518.50	-

=== Series 2 (2004) ===
No. overall	No. in series	Vehicle	Budget	Purchase price	Final cost after restoration	Final selling price	Profit/loss	Original release date
7	1–2	1988 Toyota MR2	£2,000	£500	£1,278	£1,900	+£622	10 August 2004
Work Completed: Replaced ignition barrel and boot lock, alternator and fan belt, timing belt and water pump, nearside front wing, windscreen, exhaust back box, door trim, removed rust and repainted nearside rear wing, polished body work; replaced the non original offside front wheel and refurbished rims with new tyres; full engine service including changing the oil, replacing the oil filter, replacing the air filter and replacing the spark plugs.
8	3–4	1990 Peugeot 205 GTi 1.9	£2,000	£1,000	£1,653	£2,200	+£547	17 August 2004
Work Completed: Replaced gear linkage, entire exhaust system, carpets, body trim including the wheel arches, side skirts and front and rear bumpers, front indicator and tail light lenses, cam belt, water pump, cold start valve, fan belt, petrol cap, new parcel shelf, new front and rear number plates, reset the height of the rear suspension back to stock setting, replaced the aftermarket steering wheel with an original GTI unit and fitted a CD player. Notes: Bought through a newspaper advertisement, and Mike gave tips on what to say and do and what not to say when advertising a used car on the classified ads. Edd had to repaint the replacement parcel shelf to black as it was originally grey.
9	5–6	1985 Suzuki SJ410 Samurai	£2,000	£250	£1,270	£500	-£770	24 August 2004
Work Completed: Resprayed vehicle from white to black, modified suspension and oversized wheels for 8" extra ride height, new disc brakes all round, new larger wheel arch extensions, fitted removable, plastic seat covers, replaced busted engine and fitted a roll cage kit. Notes: First vehicle to be acquired through eBay. Mike has said worst car in Wheeler Dealer history; only bought because the production team were out of time. Converted to mini monster truck. Failed MOT test due to rust holes.
10	7–8	1989 BMW 325i Touring E30	£2,000	£950	£1,792.50	£1,900	+£107.50	2 September 2004
Work Completed: Painted new bonnet. New exhaust, performance air filter, clutch slave cylinder, fog lights and power steering fluid. Cosmetics: bumper trimmings, gear-shift gaiter, badge, wheel hub caps, clear front indicator lenses with orange bulbs and new numberplates. Notes: Car bought at an auction instead of a private seller; Mike gave a primer on buying cars at auction. A tear in the driver's seat was not repaired, and used to negotiate the sale price down.
11	9–10	1977 MGB GT	£2,000	£1,000	£2,600	£2,850	+£250	9 September 2004
Work Completed: Numerous rust areas treated before full body respray from orange to Flame Red. Fabric and bottom foam of seats replaced with stylish black refurbish kit. Rusted wheels replaced with refurbished units. Chrome brightwork polished. Notes: Previous owner had replaced the rubber bumpers with a chrome set, a popular modification among MGB enthusiasts.
12	11–12	1969 Predator Beach Buggy	£2,000	£200	£3,700	£3,900	+£200	16 September 2004
Work Completed: Stripped car to bare chassis and installed beach buggy kit including a new custom fibreglass body with sidepods, new battery box, new steering column support, new petrol tank and filler cap, new custom windscreen, new steering wheel, new seats, new chrome headlight pods, new indicators, new taillights, engine cleaned up and cylinder rockers adjusted, dynamo replaced with alternator, new exhaust system and chrome engine parts installed including a protective bar, retro air filter and protective fan belt housing, rusted chassis replaced with a newer, shorter wheelbase unit, front drum brakes swapped with disc brakes, new tyres with chrome wheels. Notes: Original plan had been to purchase and restore a Volkswagen Beetle. Purchased a 1971 Beetle 1300, which was a barn-find derelict beyond restoration, and was instead converted to mark the 40th anniversary of the Beach Buggy.
-	-	Final totals	£12,000	£3,900	£12,292.50	£13,250	£956.50	-

=== Series 3 (2005) ===
No. overall	No. in series	Vehicle	Budget	Purchase price	Final cost after restoration	Final selling price	Profit/loss	Original release date
13	7–8	1989 Volkswagen Transporter T3	£3,000	£1,100	£3,825	£1,500	-£2,325	23 August 2005
Work Completed: Fixed sliding door and fitted window, fitted a new rear bumper, replaced the glowplugs, fitted a new fanbelt, changed the engine oil, replaced the oil filter, lowered suspension, fitted new plywood lining panels, rock and roll bed, installed camper van appliances, repaired a dent in the nearside rear quarter panel, full-body vinyl wrap, interior painted light blue, added artificial grass carpeting and fitted a new exhaust, moondisc hubcaps and a new front VW badge. Notes: Intent had been to purchase and restore a Type 2. Instead a T3 works van was converted to mini mobile home. The van was acquired from a friend of Mike's and bought by Edd. Later bought by one of the cameramen who worked on the show.
14	9–10	1989 Lancia Delta HF Integrale 8v	£3,000	£2,300	£3,087	£3,800	+£713	30 August 2005
Work Completed: Replaced front brake discs and pads, front suspension tracks rods & rubber bushes for urethane units, battery, alternator, radiator, grille with a new HF badge, pedal covers, door mirrors, carpets, gearstick, wheel centre caps, red paint deep polished, refitted the steering column cowling and a mini-service done including changing the oil, replacing the oil filter, fitting new spark plugs and a new air filter. Notes: Originally a non-runner with a rare factory right-hand drive conversion but no MOT.
15	3–4	1987 Mercedes-Benz 190E 2.3–16 Cosworth	£3,000	£2,700	£3,585	£3,500	-£85	6 September 2005
Work Completed: Replaced the cassette player head unit with CD player, keeping the original in the boot of the car in case the new owner wanted to replace it, replaced the front track rod ends, refitted the loose bumper trim, hydraulic suspension replaced with uprated conventional units, exhaust components replaced, fitted new Toyo tyres on all corners and adjusted the wheel alignment and tracking.
16	11–12	1989 Range Rover Series 1 Vogue SE	£3,000	£1,600	£2,035	£2,000	-£35	13 September 2005
Work Completed: Replaced tailgate, nearside rear door and roof lining changed, automatic transmission fluid, gearbox oil filter, gearbox oil sump gasket and airflow meter replaced. Notes: Originally planned for LPG conversion, but cancelled due to MOT failure and conversion costs.
17	1–2	1990 Mazda MX-5 NA 1.6	£3,000	£1,600	£2,715	£3,600	+£885	20 September 2005
Work Completed: Replaced convertible hood and interior, installed chrome trim around the interior door handles and airvents, fitted a metal gearknob and handbrake handle, fitted chrome MX-5 kickplates, fitted a new chrome mesh grille, fitted a new aerial, installed a performance air filter and chassis braces, repaired and repainted corroded A-pillar, stock alloys upgraded to second hand 15" white Enkei factory units and tyres from the second generation (NB) model. Notes: Mike used the technique of buying the car in the winter and selling during the sunnier months to capitalise on the convertible aspects of the car. Was featured on Wheeler Dealers Revisited, when Edd tracked down the new owner 4 years on, who wasn't properly looking after the car, and Edd gave advice on how to look after the car.
18	5–6	1978 Porsche 928	£3,000	£1,600	£4,950	£6,000	+£1,050	27 September 2005
Work Completed: Full body respray to original Cocoa colour, replaced headlight switch and all 4 brake calipers and pads, fitted a new battery, changed the engine oil and oil filter, repaired dents on driver's side door and rear wing, changed aftermarket BBS rims to refurbished factory "tele-dial" rims with brand-new Goodyear tyres. Notes: Originally purchased as a non-runner with no MOT and no service records. Sold at asking price with a full tank of petrol. The car was later bought back by Mike.
-	-	Final totals	£18,000	£10,900	£20,197	£20,400	£203	-

=== Series 4 (2006) ===
No. overall	No. in series	Vehicle	Budget	Purchase price	Final cost after restoration	Final selling price	Profit/loss	Original release date
19	1–2	1976 Porsche 911S 2.7 Targa	£6,000	£5,000	£7,040	£8,450	+£1,410	29 August 2006
Work Completed: Replaced US-spec rear bumper extensions with Europe-spec ones, replaced the US-style square rear numberplate with a UK-style rectangle unit, gearbox replaced with reconditioned unit, replaced clutch and both door mirrors, fixed and reconditioned targa top, removed chrome trim on wheel arches, repainted wheel centre caps from silver to black and an engine service done including replacing the spark plugs, replacing the oil pressure sender unit, changing the oil, replacing the oil filter and replacing the air filter. Notes: US-spec car imported from California with a full body respray to British racing green done less than a year before purchase. Sold at asking price. Was featured on Wheeler Dealers Revisited, when Edd drove it around the Knockhill Racing Circuit in Fife.
20	3–4	1983 Jeep CJ7	£4,000	£1,100	£3,772	£3,900	+£128	5 September 2006
Work Completed: New leaf springs and shock absorbers, new clutch master and slave cylinders, new front and rear seats, steering wheel and roof assembly, door cards refurbished, two tyres replaced, new door mirrors and bonnet catches. Notes: Originally purchased as a non-running barn-find with complete service and MOT records. Was featured on Wheeler Dealers Revisited. Another new owner, who managed to bend the front leaf springs.
21	5–6	1972 Alfa Romeo Spider Veloce 2000	£4,000	£2,200	£3,125	£4,500	+£1,375	12 September 2006
Work Completed: Filled dents in nose, front end respray, replaced manifold couplings, UK spec headlights, rusted driver's side footwell cutout and replaced with new metal and polished the chrome brightwork. Notes: Original Italy-spec model that was previously coloured blue under the red paint. Welding and metal was free because Edd had the materials hanging around the shop. Sold at asking price. Revisited in 2010: had new carburettors, but bodywork was starting to go at rear wheel arches.
22	7–8	1985 BMW 635CSi	£4,000	£2,000	£3,060	£3,700	+£640	19 September 2006
Work Completed: Replaced rear drop links and front suspension control arms, added strut brace, replaced the middle and rear exhaust sections, replaced rubber door seals, Canada-spec alloy wheels replaced with factory BBS units, beige cloth interior swapped with cream leather interior. Notes: Car was previously sent to Canada for several years before returning to the UK with a lacklustre set of Canada-spec alloy wheels. It was also recently repainted before purchase. A second 635CSi (which failed an MOT test due to underside rust) was purchased for £350 as a donor vehicle for its interior and wheels.
23	9–10	1984 Chevrolet Corvette C4	£4,000	£2,100	£3,021	£3,800	+£779	26 September 2006
Work Completed: Replaced door panel fabric, replaced digital instrument panel with a reconditioned unit, fixed faulty wiring on pop-up headlamp motor, repainted targa roof and door mirrors, replaced missing headliner, added chrome cover parts for engine bay, replaced fan thermostat wiring, replaced entire exhaust system, air conditioner recharged, wheels refurbished, car polished and waxed. Notes: Door card fabric and headliner were built from scratch using acoustic carpet, as genuine replacement parts are too expensive to import from the US. Faded paint on the body was used to mark down the selling price.
24	11–12	1992 Lexus LS400	£4,000	£1,300	£3,108	£3,300	+£192	3 October 2006
Work Completed: Headlamps upgraded to HID, front suspension wishbones replaced, air conditioner LCD replaced, rear bumper repainted, alloy wheels and tyres upgraded to Lexus IS 17" units and adjusted the tracking and wheel alignment, side indicator housings swapped with clear lenses with orange bulbs, Bluetooth hands-free phone kit added to stereo. Notes: Car was upgraded to be sold as a starter executive car targeting new/younger middle-management type buyers.
-	-	Final totals	£26,000	£13,700	£23,126	£27,650	£4,524	-

=== Series 5 (On the Road) (2008) ===
No. overall	No. in series	Vehicle	Budget	Purchase price	Final cost after restoration	Final selling price	Profit/loss	Original release date
25	1–2	1983 Mercedes-Benz 280SL (R107)	£5,000	€6,900 (£5,400)	£6,920	£7,900	+£980	28 October 2008
Work Completed: Replaced front brake discs and calipers, convertible hood, entire exhaust system, aftermarket wheels and steering wheel swapped for originals, repaired rust patch on front right wing, changed headlamps to UK-spec units. Notes: Purchased in Bergen near Munich, Germany. Car originally had no MOT in Germany due to the lack of a catalytic converter. Car purchase price was over the planned budget. Restoration price includes £400 travel expense and a credit of £135 from selling the aftermarket wheels and steering wheel.
26	3–4	1982 Lotus Esprit S3	£5,000	£3,600	£4,385	£6,200	+£1,815	4 November 2008
Work Completed: Replaced cambelt, cast iron exhaust manifold with a stainless steel unit, shock absorbers, fixed leaky aftermarket sunroof, water-damaged beige leather interior replaced with second-hand tan interior and engine service done including replacing the spark plugs, changing the oil, replacing the oil filter and replacing the air filter. Notes: Purchased at asking price. Car had failed its MOT due to faulty exhaust and rear suspension prior to purchase. Restored car taken to the Lotus test track.
27	5–6	1971 Fiat 500L	£5,000	€2,900 (£2,300)	£5,700	£6,500	+£800	11 November 2008
Work Completed: Full body respray from blue to white with red and green vinyl stripes front to back, fitted a replacement 650cc Abarth engine and gearbox and fitted UK-spec headlights. Notes: Purchased in Turin, Italy. It broke down halfway back to the UK and needed towing back. Restoration price includes £500 travel expense. Sold at asking price.
28	7–8	1981 Land Rover Series III Stage One V8	£5,000	£1,000	£2,230	£2,750	+£520	18 November 2008
Work Completed: Converted to run on liquefied petroleum gas (LPG) or petrol including installing the LPG tank and filler cap, vaporiser, a switch to select between LPG or petrol, pipework, fitting a new, uprated distributor cap, HT leads, coil and amplifier, repainted some parts black including the front bumper, windscreen, bonnet kickplates and rear tiltframe, added some black metal trim around the top of the doors and headlights, fitted a black roll bar, refitted the interior and exterior door handles, refitted the front sidelights and indicators, refitted the front grille and refitted the passenger seat. Notes: Previous owner had abandoned restoration project after the car was repainted in the wrong shade of Inca Yellow but supplied all the replacement and original parts. Restored car tested at Land Rover's off-road circuit. Final sale on-screen was £3,000, but the buyer backed out at the last minute, according to Mike's ending narration.
29	9–10	1974 Citroën DSuper 5	£5,000	€4,800 (£3,800)	£5,185	£7,000	+£1,815	25 November 2008
Work Completed: Fitted UK-spec headlights, replaced suspension pressure accumulator & regulator, nearside door mirror, seat covers, clock and engine service including changing the oil, replacing the oil filter, replacing the spark plugs, replacing the HT leads, replacing the distributor cap and cleaning the air filter. Notes: Purchased in Champagnat near Lyon, France. Restoration price includes £400 travel expense. A scratch on the nearside front wing was left unpainted, with Mike calling it part of the car's "character".
30	11–12	1984 Bentley Mulsanne Turbo	£5,000	£3,250	£6,200	£8,000	+£1,800	2 December 2008
Work Completed: Full respray and colour change from blue to Storm Grey, replaced headlights and grille for Turbo R spec units, repainted the new headlight surrounds to match the rest of the car, repainted leather seats to original blue finish, replaced the rubber windscreen seals, polished the brightwork and refitted some new chrome trim around the windscreen and on the front grille housing. Notes: Original plan had been to purchase and restore a Rolls-Royce Silver Shadow, but the example viewed had rotten bodywork so the dealer offered the Bentley instead. Sold at asking price.
-	-	Final totals	£30,000	£19,350	£30,620	£38,350	£7,730	-

=== Series 6 (2009) ===
No. overall	No. in series	Vehicle	Budget	Purchase price	Final cost after restoration	Final selling price	Profit/loss	Original release date
Part I
31	1–2	1980 Triumph Spitfire Mk4 1500	£5,000	£2,400	£3,432	£4,600	+£1,168	5 May 2009
Work Completed: Cylinder head had new guides and hardened valves fitted to run on unleaded fuel without the need of a fuel additive, fitted new engine gaskets, rear shock absorbers replaced, brightwork re-chromed, refitted missing chrome trim around the rear windscreen, fitted new front and rear numberplates, differential replaced, changed the oil and replaced the oil filter. Notes: As with the Mazda MX-5, Mike bought the car in the winter to repair and sell on the spring to take advantage of the Spitfire's convertible aspects.
32	3–4	1987 Porsche 944 Turbo	£5,000	£2,800	£5,660	£6,650	+£990	12 May 2009
Work Completed: Engine management computer retuned from 235 bhp to 266 bhp, rollcage added, shock absorbers and brake pads upgraded, Sparco racing seats with four-point harnesses installed, added second set of wheels for racing, which were painted orange, removed sound deadening fabric and CD changer. Notes: Converted to track-ready vehicle and brought to Porsche test track. Mike particularly hated the orange colour Edd chose for the racing wheels. Missing exhaust tailpipe replaced but was not mentioned.
33	5–6	1986 Audi Quattro	£5,000	£3,800	£4,568	£5,450	+£882	19 May 2009
Work Completed: Seats refurbished, new clutch reservoir installed, bumpers repaired and repainted, rear wheel bearings replaced. Notes: The gearknob and both front indicator lenses were also replaced, but not mentioned in the episode.
34	7–8	1960 Volkswagen Beetle	£5,000	£1,600	£4,809	£6,600	+£1,791	26 May 2009
Work Completed: Replacement boot floor panel welded, engine replaced with reconditioned unit, new battery, new bumpers and hubcaps as well as other brightwork, full body respray from dark blue to original Gulf Blue colour, brakes adjusted, reconnected the original fuel gauge, fitted new tail light lenses, replaced the perished window rubbers. Notes: Originally planned for Series 2 (which became the Predator Beach Buggy project). Seller included the replacement panel for the boot floor.
35	9–10	1989 Jaguar XJS 3.6 L6	£5,000	£1,000	£1,691	£2,450	+£759	2 June 2009
Work Completed: Replaced transmission mount spring, steering gaiter, bonnet, gearbox oil filter, gearbox oil sump gasket, automatic transmission fluid, headlining, centre console veneer, offside exterior door handle, repainted bonnet scuttle and front grille. Notes: Bought from a dealer that received the car as a trade-in.
Part II
36	11–12	1975 Ferrari Dino 308 GT4	£10,000	£8,750	£11,880	£13,000	+£1,120	20 October 2009
Work Completed: Body dents pulled out and holes in the front undercarriage panel patched with fiberglass, exhaust manifold replaced, full body respray in original red, wheels refurbished and fitted a new rear number plate.
37	13–14	1988 Mini City 1000	£5,000	£700	£2,290	£2,600	+£310	27 October 2009
Work Completed: Replaced the original steel wheels with a set of gold Minilite alloys with new tyres, fitted a chrome rocker cover, fitted a chrome coil housing, fitted new HT leads, full-body vinyl wrap in carbon fiber pattern with white bonnet stripes and a black, grey and white Union Jack roof pattern, replaced the original grey interior with a new black interior with Cobra racing seats, new door cards, new rear seat covers, all black carpets and new dash panels, replaced the nearside radius swing arm, replaced the original instrument binnacle with a retro central unit with a new speedometer and a new wiring loom, replaced the choke cable, replaced the aftermarket square front and rear number plates with new rectangle units, replaced the aftermarket clear tail light lenses with factory coloured units and polished all the brightwork and fitted a new nearside door mirror which was missing when the car was bought. Notes: Customised for auction at a Mini 50th anniversary gathering in Longbridge. While at the auction, the car had gold circular decals added to front and rear and on both sides.
38	15–16	1989 TVR S2	£5,000	£2,550	£3,040	£4,250	+£1,210	3 November 2009
Work Completed: Replaced brake servo and master cylinder, track-rod ends (and did wheel alignment and tracking), re-cored radiator, electrics professionally checked, replaced the hazard warning light switch, resoldered the scotch locks in the wiring loom, fitted a new metal plate at the bottom of the aerial, lubricated left-side power window mechanism and re-trimmed seats and welded the bolts in place on the bottom of the seat frames. Notes: Acquired through eBay.
39	17–18	1995 Land Rover Discovery ES TDI	£5,000	£1,500	£2,731	£3,000	+£269	10 November 2009
Work Completed: Added roof rack, rear door ladder, engine snorkel, under tray protection and diff guards, front and rear light guards and front bumper spotlights and replaced the power steering box. Notes: Converted to an expedition off-roader.
40	19–20	1996 BMW E36 M3 Convertible	£5,000	£4,500	£5,580	£5,950	+£370	17 November 2009
Work Completed: Replaced gearbox, interior (front & rear seats and front & rear doorcards) and alarm unit, refurbished alloy wheels. Notes: Sold at asking price. While stripping out the back seats, Edd discovered a mouse nest. The second-hand interior that Mike sourced from a dismantler's had manually adjustable front seats whereas the car's were electric, so Edd had to refurbish the original seats using the material from the new seats. The original seats were also heated but the ones from the second-hand set were not. Edd made the decision to not swap the delicate electrics over.
-	-	Final totals	£55,000	£29,600	£45,861	£54,550	£8,869	-

=== Series 7 (2010) ===
This series dropped the two-part format in favour of a single one-hour episode format.

No. overall	No. in series	Vehicle	Budget	Purchase price	Final cost after restoration	Final selling price	Profit/loss	Original release date
Part I
41	1	1973 Jensen Interceptor III	£5,000	£5,000	£5,430	£6,500	+£1,070	4 May 2010
Work Completed: Rusty passenger footwell cut out and replaced with new metal, replaced brake master cylinder and steering rack, leather interior cleaned and restored, wheels polished. Notes: Car was missing the air conditioning system, which was not reinstated due to cost. During a visit to a Jensen specialist, Mike was given a photocopy of the car's original production files. Restored car brought to Millbrook Proving Ground for its test drive.
42	2	1990 Ford Sierra Sapphire RS Cosworth	£5,000	£4,100	£5,920	£6,200	+£280	11 May 2010
Work Completed: Gearbox overhaul performed, clutch replaced, valve stem oil seals & guides replaced, fitted a new head gasket, fitted a new cam cover gasket, fitted new seats, replaced the door cards, fitted an original leather steering wheel, removed the Motorsport sticker from the windscreen, Escort Cosworth alloy wheels replaced with original units, front bumper repainted. Notes: Previous owner had the engine modified to around 380 to 400 bhp and converted it from 4WD to 2WD. Restored car taken to a 1-mile drag strip to do a 0–60 acceleration contest. Mike scored 5.9 seconds while Edd did 6.4 seconds. New tyres were fitted but not included in the final budget.
43	3	1979 Volkswagen Type 2 T2	£5,000	£2,500	£8,465	£9,450	+£985	18 May 2010
Work Completed: Full body respray from white to metallic orange, upgraded the original 1584cc engine to 1641cc with a twinport cylinder heads, aluminium oil cooler, alternator, new fan housing, twin carburetors, twin port manifolds, new air filters, new exhaust system. Rusty tailgate replaced with new one with a new chrome Volkswagen badge, driver door, refurbished Recaro leather seats installed, chrome wheels, door cards, black vinyl interior panels, carpet, front and rear number plates, front and rear windscreen rubber seals, removed the "eyelids" from the headlights. Notes: Originally planned for Series 3 (which became the T3 Transporter project). Sold off-screen to an army major who was serving overseas. The Recaro leather seats were recycled from the Sierra Cosworth project and were refurbished using leather from the old rear seats of that car.
44	4	1995 BMW 840Ci	£5,000	£3,500	£5,040	£5,750	+£710	25 May 2010
Work Completed: Repaired and resprayed the front bumper and driver's door, replaced cooling fan and recharged air conditioning, replaced automatic transmission cooler, installed new windscreen and front grilles, refurbished alloy wheels, bodywork polished. Notes: Purchase price includes the new front grilles and replacement windscreen.
45	5	1972 Triumph Stag	£5,000	£3,400	£4,529	£5,500	+£971	1 June 2010
Work Completed: Replaced cam cover gaskets, upgraded the radiator and hoses, replaced the differential gasket, fitted a new hood and frame, replaced the front bumper, replaced the front number plate and polished brightwork. Notes: Acquired through eBay.
Part II
46	7	1970 Bond Bug 700ES	£5,000	£2,500	£3,261	£5,550	+£2,289	12 October 2010
Work Completed: Replaced the gearbox, fitted a new canopy and decals, replaced the brake shoes and replaced the differential half shaft oil seals. Notes: Restored for the Bond Bug 40th anniversary gathering at Woburn Abbey, featuring designer Tom Karen. Buyer offered £550 over the asking price.
47	9	"1968 Volvo P1800S"	£5,000	£5,000	£5,795	£8,350	+£2,555	19 October 2010
Work Completed: Replaced fuel gauge, fuel tank and sender, replaced the front shock absorbers and springs, replaced the engine rocker cover, fitted new spark plugs, fitted new distributor points, repaired and repainted the front crossmember, updated the valve seats with hardened units in order to run unaided on unleaded petrol and rebuilt the twin carburetors to increase engine performance. Notes: Mike owned one, and this was the model of car driven by Simon Templar in the 1960s television series The Saint.
48	8	1989 Land Rover Defender 90	£5,000	£3,000	£5,677	£6,000	+£323	26 October 2010
Work Completed: Fitted an aftermarket hi-lift camshaft, replaced the hydraulic valve lifters, replaced the original steel wheels with a set of modern Defender alloys, fitted new modern headlight surrounds, which were repainted silver, replaced the original orange front indicator lenses and clear bulbs with clear lenses and orange bulbs, aftermarket bonnet checker plate powder coated satin black, replaced the steering wheel with an aftermarket unit, replaced the seat bottoms, fitted a new front grill, which was repainted silver, fitted a new front bumper, replaced the original front "Land Rover 90" decal with a modern "Land Rover" sticker and relocated it to the bonnet tip, replaced the passenger and rear doors, installed a pair of rear side windows and a full respray from blue with a white roof to all gunmetal gray. Notes: Farm vehicle turned into a Chelsea tractor. Previous owner had swapped the original 2.5-litre turbo diesel motor with a Rover V8 engine.
49	10	2001 Subaru Impreza WRX	£5,000	£3,250	£5,255	£5,400	+£145	2 November 2010
Work Completed: Fitted a performance air filter, replaced the original exhaust system with a big bore unit, ECU remapped from 206.5 bhp to 243.5 bhp, replaced the clutch with an upgraded unit, replaced all of the original brake discs and calipers with upgraded vented Brembo units, standard alloy wheels and tyres uprated to gold WRX STI units, which were repainted satin black, black racing stripes added with both Mike and Edd's signatures inserted on the bonnet and boot lid. Notes: Restored car tested on Rockingham Motor Speedway.
50	6	1968 Lotus Elan S4 SE Coupe	£10,000	£8,500	£11,685	£16,700	+£5,015	9 November 2010
Work Completed: Replaced the front and mid section of the exhaust system (including the manifold) with a stainless-steel unit, fitted new exhaust manifold gaskets, replaced both front suspension ball joints, replaced the rubber driveshaft "doughnut" couplings with custom made constant velocity joint assemblies, repainted the wheels from black to silver and fitted new chrome spinners, faulty nearside headlamp assembly fixed by tightening loose bolt, replaced the modern rear number plate with a classic black unit with silver characters and a full body respray in the car's original red/white color. Notes: The previous owner had had the engine bored out to 1.7L, putting out 150bhp. Restored car tested at Gurston Down Motorsport Hillclimb, where Mike beat Edd 46 seconds to 49 seconds.
-	-	Final totals	£50,000	£40,750	£61,057	£75,400	£14,343	-

=== Series 8 (2011) ===
No. overall	No. in series	Vehicle	Budget	Purchase price	Final cost after restoration	Final selling price	Profit/loss	Original release date	Viewers (millions)
Part I
51	1	1973 Jaguar E-Type Series 3 V12	£15,000	£13,250	£16,090	£18,500	+£2,410	5 April 2011	0.12
Work Completed: Replaced bonnet underpanel, replaced the entire exhaust system with a stainless steel unit with a chrome fantail, replaced leaking pinion oil seal, wheels refurbished, sills & bonnet repainted, door card and carpets renewed and seats reupholstered.
52	2	1979 Mini Moke	£7,000	£5,800	£7,080	£7,200	+£120	12 April 2011	0.06
Work Completed: Replaced the original radiator and cooling fan with uprated units, original rubber cone suspension replaced with a conical spring type, black soft top replaced with white one with matching white side panels, rust on roof frame repaired and frame powder coated to match the body colour, rust on the underside of the car cut out and replaced with new metal and painted, original seat covers replaced with white seat covers. Notes: Australian built car with a 1275cc Austin Metro engine.
53	3	2001 Range Rover P38 4.0 HSE	£3,000	£2,100.36	£3,042	£3,500	+£458	19 April 2011	0.09
Work Completed: Replaced the air suspension pump, replaced both rubber front anti-roll bar bushes with new polyurethane units, fitted a new front grille, replaced the offside headlight assembly, replaced the front offside electric window regulator assembly, replaced the satnav control unit, refitted the missing front fog lamps with new units, refitted the missing front and rear Range Rover badges and added tint to the rear windows. Notes: Car broke down after collection due to a faulty air suspension pump and needed towing back to the workshop.
54	4	1959 Austin-Healey "Frogeye" Sprite	£5,000	£4,500	£7,475	£8,600	+£1,125	26 April 2011	0.09
Work Completed: Full body respray from red to Iris Blue, front drum brakes swapped for disc brakes from an MG Midget, brightwork professionally polished, new seat cover kit fitted and replaced the original wheels with a set of Minilite alloys. Notes: Car featured a 1275cc uprated engine. Faded soft top was used to mark down the selling price.
55	5	2002 Saab 9–3 Turbo Convertible	£3,000	£2,400	£3,360	£3,750	+£390	3 May 2011	0.17
Work Completed: Replaced turbocharger, ignition coil pack and spark plugs, nearside headlamp housing, ignition key barrel, aerial, gearknob, front badge, pulled out some dents and fitted a steering rack brace kit.
Part II
56	6	1970 Dodge Charger	£15,000	$23,000 £14,000	£18,160	£20,000	+£1,840	4 October 2011	0.17
Work Completed: Front wheel bearings replaced, new gear linkage installed to sort poor gear select problem, faulty power steering pump replaced, modified rear spring hangers replaced with stock ones, faulty headlamp motor replaced so signature headlamps open and close properly, signature horn from The Dukes of Hazzard installed. Notes: Purchased near Dallas, Texas, and driven to Paris, Texas, to pay a small tribute to the film of the same name before being shipped back to the UK. Second-hand parts purchased at a junkyard in Arizona. Restoration price includes £1,840 shipping, £777 import tax, £1,000 travel expenses. Restored car was tested at a quarter-mile drag strip, where Mike clocked in at 18.056 seconds and Edd did 17.048 seconds. Sold at asking price with a full tank of petrol. Featured car had the 383 Magnum engine.
57	7	1982 DeLorean DMC-12	£10,000	$15,500 £9,650	£14,715	£20,500	+£5,785	11 October 2011	0.30
Work Completed: Dents in stainless steel panels removed, rear louvre panel fixed with fibreglass and repainted, flywheel/crankshaft oil seal replaced, interior revamped with new seat covers, new gear shift gaiter, new carpets and new instrument binnacle, faulty window motors replaced, non-working aircon system fixed by changing blown fuse, offside rear light lens replaced and wheels refurbished. Notes: Purchased near Auburn, California. Restoration price includes £2,500 import tax & shipping, £1,000 travel expenses. Sold at a DeLorean gathering in Norfolk at £500 over the asking price.
58	8	1954 Chevrolet 3100 Stepside	£10,000	$8,650 £5,400	£10,993	£13,600	+£2,607	18 October 2011	0.35
Work Completed: Engine upgraded from single to twin carburettors with new manifold, engine bay resprayed to match Chrysler Cream body colour (paint supplied by seller), bedfloor wood replaced, replaced the chrome tailgate chains, fitted a new chrome rear emblem, soundproofing installed inside the cab to reduce engine noise and vibrations, white grille replaced with chrome version, repainted the front Chevrolet badge and replaced the original wheels (including the side mounted spare) with a set of new powdercoated black "Smoothie" wheels with chrome beauty rings and chrome hubcaps. Notes: Purchased near San Francisco, California. Restoration price includes £1,950 shipping, £300 import tax and £1,000 travel expenses. The rear axle and leaf springs were also repainted satin black, the exhaust seems to have either been replaced or cleaned up and the side skirts repainted but not mentioned on the show.
59	9	1969 Volkswagen Karmann Ghia Type 14 Cabriolet	£10,000	$10,000 £6,000	£10,450	£11,500	+£1,050	25 October 2011	0.21
Work Completed: Gearbox refurbished, new clutch fitted, engine removed and engine bay cleaned including fitting of new soundproof firewall lining panels, hole in the trunk left from auxiliary heater welded over with new metal, black exterior sills stripped and re-sprayed to match the colour of the car, interior refurbished with new dash panels, new carpets and new door cards, exterior cosmetics such as front badge and chrome door trim fitted. Notes: Purchased in Boise, Idaho. Despite being a German car, it was explained by Mike that the only quality used examples can be found in the American west coast. Restoration price includes £2,050 import tax & shipping and £1,000 travel expenses. UK spec taillights were also fitted but not mentioned on the show.
60	10	1957 Chevrolet Bel Air 210	£10,000	$6,700 £4,000	£13,504	£16,000	+£2,496	1 November 2011	0.22
Work Completed: Full respray from light blue to Ferrari Yellow with white roof; new carburettor and air filter unit, new front and rear bumpers, new front grille, new exterior chrome trim such as bonnet rockets, front Chevrolet badge and V trim, new headlamp surrounds, new door handles, new windscreen wipers, new door mirrors, new side trim, new rear fins and a new rear badge, new chrome horn ring, dashboard and steering wheel repainted, new headlining, new interior B pillars, original vinyl seats and carpet cleaned, new door cards, armrests, chrome window winders and chrome door handles, new rearview mirror, new instrument binnacle, original steel wheels were replaced with chrome units with new tyres. Notes: Original barn find purchased in Sarasota, Florida. Restoration price includes £2,155 import tax & shipping and £1,000 travel expenses. Carburetor and air filter caught fire shortly after purchase. Bonnet paint was blistered and car was unsafe to drive. This car is more correctly a 210 model (the middle trim range) with Bel Air (top trim range) quarter panel trim. It does not carry the front fender chevrons or extended rear fin trim of a true Bel Air.
-	-	Final totals	£88,000	£67,100.36	£104,869	£123,150	£18,281	-	-

=== Series 9 (2012) ===
No. overall	No. in series	Vehicle	Budget	Purchase price	Final cost after restoration	Final selling price	Profit/loss	Original release date	UK viewers (million)
Part I
61	1	1970 Fiat Dino Coupe 2400	£15,000	€15,000 £12,500	£14,480	£15,500	+£1,020	20 March 2012	0.13
Work Completed: Distributor rebuilt: distributor cap contacts cleaned, new rotor arm bearing and centrifugal bob weights installed, track control arm bushings replaced, dents and scratches in the bodywork repaired and painted, Cromodora alloy wheels and chrome center hubcaps refurbished, original orange interior carpets replaced with specially made black carpets, center dash board and center console retrimmed with black vinyl. Notes: Purchased in Trieste, Northern Italy. Allegedly seized by the Italian Police in 1970 and stored in a police warehouse till 2004. Restoration price includes £530 travel expense and a £200 credit from selling the orange carpets. Restored car brought to Millbrook Proving Ground for its test drive.
62	2	1992 Morgan +4	£15,000	£13,000	£14,600	£21,000	+£6,400	27 March 2012	0.16
Work Completed: New chassis fitted, new plywood floor panels fitted, rear suspension uprated with new Panhard rod, 4 leaf springs instead of 6 to soften the ride, tramp bars or traction bars and new shock absorbers, front suspension uprated with new brakes, hubs, shock absorbers, springs and kingpins. Notes: Purchased from a specialist dealer who was selling the car on behalf of an American who could not import the car back to the US when he moved. Included a tour of Morgan Motor Company plant in Malvern.
63	3	2000 BMW E39 M5	£5,000	£4,000	£5,770	£6,500	+£730	3 April 2012	0.20
Work Completed: New front suspension strut mounts fitted (supplied by the seller), worn alternator bearings replaced instead of buying whole new part, "Angel eyes" headlights and taillights from 2001 model year fitted, replaced the front foglights, auto-dimming rearview mirror and nearside door mirror replaced, bonnet repaired and resprayed, missing sound damping under the bonnet refitted, new air filters fitted and alloy wheels refurbished and painted in gunmetal metallic paint. Notes: Engine had claimed extra 30 hp via undisclosed means. Tyres were originally mismatched and worn and were changed but not revealed on show. Restored car achieved a top speed of 170 mph. Sold at asking price.
64	4	1977 Renault Alpine A310 V6	£10,000	€14,000 £12,000	£13,500	£13,500	+£0	10 April 2012	0.21
Work Completed: New water pump installed to solve overheating problems, worn rear wheel bearings changed, new air filter installed, Holley 4-barrel carburetor and customized intake manifold upgrade installed to increase the engine's power, non-working high beams repaired, wheel center caps repainted. Notes: Purchased in Veyre-Monton, France. Car overheated shortly after purchase and had to be towed back to the UK. Restoration cost includes £500 travel expenses. Restored car brought to Brands Hatch for a Renault Alpine gathering. Sold to the only bidder of unknown identity as not willing to appear on TV. (First car to break even on sale.)
65	5	1974 Porsche 914-4	£5,000	£4,000	£5,310	£8,250	+£2,940	17 April 2012	0.19
Work Completed: Refurbished engine: Thermostatic bellows for engine cooling flaps replaced with thermostatic spring from VW Beetle, external oil cooler replaced, engine cooling tinware cleaned and repainted, new HT leads and distributor fitted, new fuel injector seals fitted, Fuchs alloy wheels cleaned and polished, targa top resprayed, vinyl panels on B-pillars replaced, body steam cleaned and machine polished, interior carpets cleaned with wet-vac and replacement seat covers fitted. Notes: Originally a non-working barn find. Restored car taken to Silverstone Circuit for its test drive. Sold back to original seller.
66	6	1993 Mercedes-Benz 300GE	£10,000	£9,500	£11,463	£12,000	+£537	24 April 2012	0.17
Work Completed: Speedo drive oil seals replaced, scratched center console sanded and re-lacquered, engine bay steam cleaned, battery tray treated with rust remedy and repainted, radiator top hose replaced, cam cover polished, front grille replaced with an aftermarket 2012 unit and painted in original colour, front bumper replaced and painted, headlight surrounds and original rear bumper repainted, original taillights replaced with upgraded LED taillights, second hand leather steering wheel from an E-class fitted, front seats refurbished. Notes: Restoration price includes a £90 credit from selling the old front bumper and grille. Restored car brought to Mercedes-Benz off-road testing facility. After sometime on the market, sold to an online buyer from Cyprus.
67	7	1999 Jaguar XK8 Convertible	£10,000	£6,000	£10,075	N/A	−£10,075	1 May 2012	0.18
Work Completed: Throttle body replaced to fix "Limp Home Mode" problem, engine and exhaust system decarbonized to reduce emissions, new lowered springs and shocks, new XKR brakes installed, both back exhaust mufflers replaced with aftermarket ones, chrome front grille replaced with a satin black unit and a new front numberplate fitted. Notes: A contest was held for the programme to choose the next car to buy from a lucky viewer. The XK8 was chosen over a 1963 Triumph TR4a and a 1989 Lotus Excel SA among the finalists. Restored car tested at Rockingham Motor Speedway. Was used as a promotional prize with a £10,000 budget. (Sixth loss of the series.)
Part II
68	8	2002 Gardner Douglas Cobra	£20,000	£17,500	£21,030	£23,000	+£1,970	18 September 2012	0.16
Work Completed: Carburetor jets resized and custom exhaust fitted to reduce emissions for Individual Vehicle Approval (IVA) test, also, custom head rests fitted as a requirement for IVA, rear axle narrowed by fitting shorter lower control arms and shorter drive shafts, new deep-dished wheels fitted. Notes: Mike opted to find a kit car version rather than spend money for a genuine AC Cobra, which would have been over budget. Car was brought to a drag strip, where Edd did a top speed of 110 mph while Mike reached 108 mph.
69	9	1960 Jaguar Mark 2 3.8	£8,000	£6,800	£7,804	£9,000	+£1,196	25 September 2012	0.24
Work Completed: Crankcase ventilation system fixed by cleaning the oil screen and replacing the breather pipe that runs to the oil catch can to sort out blue exhaust smoke, clutch master and slave cylinders replaced to fix spongy clutch pedal and 1–2 gear crunch, interior woodwork on the dashboard top and doors replaced, leather seats replaced, hole in the exhaust down pipe welded up. Notes: Brought to Oxford to pay a small tribute to Inspector Morse.
70	10	1945 Willys MB Jeep	£10,000	$13,000 £8,000	£10,862	£16,000	+£5,138	2 October 2012	0.19
Work Completed: Rusted floor replaced with a new panel and painted in original olive drab, missing jerrycan holder installed on the back, gearbox replaced with a refurbished part and painted in olive drab, all seat cushions replaced with new ones, missing manually operated period windscreen wipers reinstalled, missing WW2 first-aid kit box reinstalled under the dash. Notes: Purchased near San Francisco, California. Restoration price includes £2,000 shipping. Brought to Upminster, Essex, for display at an annual military vehicle show.
71	11	1996 Nissan Skyline R33	£3,500	£3,000	£3,655	£4,500	+£845	9 October 2012	0.31
Work Completed: Custom Japanese wheels replaced as part of purchase deal. Rusty metal on the strut tower cut out and replaced with a patch from another Skyline, standard intercooler swapped for a larger one and front bumper modified to relocate the intercooler from the inner wing to the front of the car behind the front bumper, strut brace fitted, stock rear spoiler replaced with an adjustable aftermarket one, suspension set up for drifting: front camber adjusted to −2.6°, front caster adjusted −6.5° and rear camber adjusted to −0.9°. Also the tracking was readjusted. Notes: Mike beat Edd in a drifting contest with a score of 6–3. First Japanese car featured since series 7. Suspension already had adjustable suspension parts and may have been previously used as a track-day car.
72	12	1975 Triumph TR6	£7,000	£6,000	£7,050	£8,500	+£1,450	16 October 2012	0.26
Work Completed: Cylinder head fitted with hardened exhaust valve seats so the engine can run on unleaded petrol, conventional water based coolant flushed and replaced with synthetic 'water free' coolant, a small hole in the petrol tank repaired using tinning & patch method, old vinyl roof replaced with a new one, old Lucas fuel pump upgraded to a modern Bosch fuel pump, both seats re-padded as foam had crumbled. Notes: Restored car taken to Blackpool and Lancashire to pay tribute to the 4th RAC Rally won by John Wallwork and Harold Brooks in a Triumph TR2 in 1954. Sold at asking price.
73	13	1963 BMW Isetta 300	£10,000	£6,800	£10,500	£12,000	+£1,500	23 October 2012	0.18
Work Completed: Rear brake shoes replaced and rear brake drum skimmed, rubber gear linkage grommets replaced, flares on front wheel arches and rusty lower part of the near side wheel arch cut out and replaced with new panels, whole car sanded to bare metal and resprayed from yellow to factory Japan Red and Feather White colour combination, perished window rubber seals replaced, new front and rear chrome bumpers fitted, new narrower rim steel front wheels fitted and painted white, headlight pods chromed instead of repainted, interior re-trimmed with custom vinyl panels, missing vinyl bench seat custom made to match body colour, steering wheel refurbished using original moulds, new taillight bulbs fitted, original black front badges replaced with chrome units. Notes: Rear brake locked up shortly after purchase and car had to be towed back to the garage. Sold at asking price to BMW Heritage UK for use as a Museum and Press Fleet car.
74	14	1967 Ford Mustang GT Fastback	£15,000	$21,000 £13,000	£18,320	£25,000	+£6,680	30 October 2012	0.18
Work Completed: Replaced dented aftermarket front wings with original second-hand units, full body respray and colour change from black to Highland Green, replaced lower control arms on front suspension due to worn bushes and ball joints, replaced the front brake hoses, replaced rear drum brakes, refurbished power steering system, upgraded all the dashboard panels (including the instrument binnacle, dials and lenses) to factory aluminium deluxe spec, original wheels replaced with new aluminium "Torque Thrust" alloys with new tyres (echoing the wheels on Steve McQueen's car in Bullitt) and various chrome trim items including front and rear bumpers, new front badges and front grille trim, new chrome air filter, new side and rear trim and badges. Purchased and sprayed but did not install rear trim panel; left in the boot for new owner to decide on fitting it. Notes: Purchased near San Diego, California. Purchase price includes a pair of original front wings. Car was desirable 'A Code' vehicle (289-4V engine). Final cost includes £2,000 shipping and travel expenses. Originality reduced by re-spraying different colour, changing wheels and adding non-original parts. Brought to Salisbury Plain after restoration for Mike and Edd to re-enact a Hollywood police chase scene (with Edd driving a Ford Crown Victoria Police Interceptor).
75	15	2000 Mercedes-Benz SLK200	£2,800	£2,010	£2,955	£3,650	+£695	6 November 2012	0.15
Work Completed: Replaced the hydraulic pump and relay of the retractable roof mechanism, replaced the supercharger (Kompressor) and drive belts, fitted a new brake master cylinder, replaced the stability control sensor, replaced the nearside headlamp, replaced the non-original CLK wheels with SLK alloy wheels which had newer tyres, replaced the chrome exhaust tailpipe, had several rust patches and scratches touched up and reinstalled an original-spec CD player. Notes: Mike recovered parts from a crashed car in a breakers.
-	-	Final totals	£146,000	£124,110	£157,374	£178,400	£31,026	-	

=== Series 10 (2013) ===
No. overall	No. in series	Vehicle	Budget	Purchase price	Final cost after restoration	Final selling price	Profit/loss	Original release date	UK viewers (million)
Part I
76	1	1996 Aston Martin DB7	£13,000	£12,500	£14,468	£15,000	+£532	19 February 2013	0.31
Work Completed: Leaking oil cooler and pipes replaced; oil filter replaced. Cracked exhaust manifolds replaced. Black grille replaced with chrome unit. Satin alloy wheels chemically stripped, powder coated black and sprayed silver, front tyres replaced and tracking adjusted. Leaking door rubbers diagnosed with smoke machine, and padded with rubber tube to fix water ingress. Notes: Because of Aston Martin's association with the James Bond 007 film series, several James Bond and other spy film puns were thrown by Mike and Edd throughout the episode. Car was subsequently advertised for sale for £16,995 at Runnymede Motor Company.
77	2	1972 Ford Escort Mk1 L	£5,000	£4,500	£8,500	£11,800	+£3,300	26 February 2013	0.38
Work Completed: Front drum brakes and suspension upgraded to Ford Capri 2.8i-based air-vented disc brakes, shock absorbers and springs. Limited slip differential fitted. New brake hoses and servo assisted dual-brake master cylinders fitted. Replaced near-side "Mexico" front wing. Full body respray from brown to Daytona Yellow. New window rubbers installed. Pair of 1970s Lucas rally spot lights, sports steering wheel, chrome wing mirrors and replacement original chrome front bumper fitted. Replaced Fiesta XR2 Recaro front seats with original black ones, re-trimmed rear seat from brown to black. Replacement black door cards, carpets and dashboard panel installed. Centre of front grille resprayed satin black. Wheels swapped with repainted 13" units. Notes: Previous owner swapped original 1300 cc motor with a 1600 cc unit. Restored car taken to Ford Dagenham's heritage fleet prior to sale. Mike and Edd were presented with a 1:43-scale Minichamps diecast replica of the Escort 1.6 RS by the fleet's curator Colin.
78	3	2002 Range Rover L322 TD6 Vogue	£5,000	£5,000	£9,565	£10,500	+£935	5 March 2013	0.34
Work Completed: Full body respray from textured satin black and blue to Whistler White. Replaced the wiring loom for the fuel injectors due to failed connection to injector #3. Black/blue 22" rims refurbished to graphite. Refurbished all of the blue interior trim to carbon fibre style using a water transfer print method. Replaced air suspension compressor as failed piston ring in original unit was unavailable as a spare part. Replaced headlamps, bumper, front grill and rear lights with 2007 facelift units. Steering wheel emblem replaced with a new one. Fitted new Range Rover emblems on the front and back. Notes: Project was unique, as it involved reverting a heavily customized car to near-factory spec. Outside temp indicator showing minus 40 °C left unfixed.
79	4	2000 Porsche Boxster S	£5,000	£1,000	£3,540	£6,400	+£2,860	12 March 2013	0.40
Work Completed: Tiptronic transmission oil and filter changed to sort out slipping first gear in automatic mode, all four brake discs skimmed with on-car brake lathe and brake pads replaced, both catalytic converters replaced with aftermarket units due to rusted and rattling heat shields, exhaust back box changed with a stainless steel aftermarket unit, headlights and taillights replaced with clear lens lights from 2003 model, both leather seats refurbished with Alcantara inserts, all four wheels refurbished and painted black. Notes: Found on an Internet forum originally being sold for parts. Car was mothballed for four years due to a transmission problem and rattle in the exhaust. Sold for a £100 discount from original asking price so that the new owner could fill up the petrol tank.
80	5	1966 Morris Minor 1000 Traveller	£5,000	£2,450	£6,500	£8,500	+£2,000	19 March 2013	0.35
Work Completed: Replaced rear wooden frame; new rear wings and roof guttering; full body respray to original Almond Green; wheels repainted in original white; fitted a new front number plate and replaced the later yellow rear number plate with black lettering with a vintage black unit with silver lettering; new headlining (supplied by seller) and carpet set installed; cleaned seats and door cards; replaced gaskets of rocker cover, inspection panels and manifolds; engine repainted to original BMC green. Notes: Sold at asking price with a full tank of petrol.
81	6	1999 TVR Cerbera	£10,000	£8,000	£12,850	£14,000	+£1,150	26 March 2013	0.31
Work Completed: Replaced steel chassis frame and suspension wishbones; new shock absorbers; CV joints refurbished with new gaiters; new accessory belt; new windscreen; silver alloy wheels powder coated to gloss black. Notes: Sold at asking price.
Part II
82	7	1972 Lamborghini Urraco P250S	£20,000	€25,000 £21,380	£27,236	£35,000	+£7,764	17 September 2013	0.21
Work Completed: Refurbished engine: New timing belt installed, timing belt idler pulley bearings replaced, new distributor cap, HT leads, spark plugs, air filters installed. Engine oil and filter changed. Ignition timing set to 18° BTDC, four Weber two-barrel downdraft carburetors adjusted for correct idle, choke and A/F mixture. Transmission overhauled with a refurbished clutch plate and new clutch cover, new clutch slave cylinder and clutch release bearing, missing clutch slave cylinder return spring reinstalled, new custom-made hydraulic pipe installed. Seized brakes refurbished by cleaning the brake discs and installing new brake pads. Clutch and brake fluids replaced. Notes: Purchased from Kraków, Poland. Restoration price includes £3,000 shipping. Mike could not start the car due to loose cam belt and could not move the car due to seized brakes, as it was kept in storage for over six years. Restored car taken to Italy for its test drive and to participate in a parade to celebrate the 50th anniversary of Lamborghini. Most expensive purchase made on any car to date.
83	8	1958 Ford Popular 103E Hot rod	£10,000	£6,000	£18,250	£23,000	+£4,750	24 September 2013	0.25
Work Completed: Second-hand front suspension and front brakes from a Jaguar XJ installed by replacing the previous, badly installed Triumph Vitesse front suspension with modified chassis rails, shortened XJ subframe, and sway bar. Rusted metal front wings and bonnet replaced with one-piece fiberglass flip front panel. Rear lights and exhaust back pipes moved to the rear wings. Car painted in one of the original paint schemes from the famous "Pinball Wizard" Ford Popular with Medium flake Purple for the base coat and Holographic flake Gold for the stripes. Engine spruced up with new rocker covers and headers, chrome alternator, HT leads and a retro air filter. Original headlight pods replaced with Venom LED retro headlights and LED tail lights installed. Interior upgraded with re-trimmed vinyl dashboard and door cards, new carpets and simple vinyl seats. Four custom-made aluminium rims and custom backlit rear number plate installed. Notes: Modified hot rod fitted with a 5.7-litre Edelbrock Chevrolet V8 that generates 300 bhp. Micky Bray built the famous "Pinball Wizard" Ford Popular from which the paint scheme idea was taken, and which was owned at one time by Mike's dad, Roger. The restored car was taken to Southend-on-Sea for a test drive where it was shown to Roger for his approval.
84	9	1964 Chevrolet Corvette Sting Ray C2	US$30,000 £20,000	US$29,000 £18,100	£25,280	£45,500	+£20,220	1 October 2013	0.23
Work Completed: Distributor shaft and cap, spark plugs and HT leads replaced; mechanical ignition system replaced with electronic unit, rev counter reconnected to distributor. Right-hand-side front drum brake adjusted. Clock fixed. Fibreglass body sanded down and reinforced with carbon fibre filler. Full body respray to original Rally Red. New interior installed. Rechromed bumpers and brightwork installed. Notes: Roadster model with detachable hardtop. Purchased from Healdsburg, California. Restoration price includes £3,000 shipping. Previous owner abandoned restoration project, but supplied all the replacement parts with the car. New convertible hood assembled and installed shortly after purchase; however, the new rear window needed to be replaced due to warping. Restored car taken to the Coventry Transport Museum to attend a Corvette 60th anniversary party. Highest profit made on any car to date.
85	10	1983 FSM Syrena 105L	zł9,000 £1,850	zł7,000 £1,400	£5,454	£8,000	+£2,546	8 October 2013	0.25
Work Completed: Worm and roller steering box replaced; existing steering shaft welded to replacement unit. Drum brake slave cylinders replaced and shoes refurbished. Gear linkage repaired. Dynamo replaced with alternator; new drive belt installed, old regulator removed, polarity of coils and battery rotated from positive to negative earth. Full body respray from yellow to Polish flag greyish white/burgundy red motif. New door cards to match seat colour. New car stereo installed. Chrome brightwork polished; black plastic wheel parts chromed. Notes: Purchased from Ruda Śląska, Poland. Restored car taken to London to give Polish ambassador Witold Sobków a ride. Sold to the Bubble Car Museum in Lincolnshire to be used as a museum display.
86	11	2002 Lotus Elise Series 2	£10,000	£8,400	£11,550	£13,250	+£1,700	15 October 2013	0.24
Work Completed: Rover K engine head polished and ported to give a power increase from 120 bhp to 150 bhp; engine bolts and head gasket replaced. Stock springs and shock absorbers replaced with coilovers. New Advan Neova tyres installed; alloy wheels refurbished in satin black. Rear grille replaced with new diffuser; rear air scoops replaced with carbon fibre pods; new matte black filler cap; fog lamps replaced with 2010 model units; new Lotus badge. Front bodywork repair corrected; scratches and imperfections repainted; headlamps and indicator lamps correctly refitted. Notes: Seller threw in some replacement parts in the deal. Restored car taken to Silverstone Circuit for a hot lap challenge: Mike did a time of 1:12.4, while Edd did 1:15. The coilover suspension were refurbished units from the manufacturer's demo car.
87	12	"1962 Cadillac Coupe de Ville"	US$6,200 £4,000	US$5,000 £3,000	£19,550	£25,000	+£5,450	22 October 2013	0.22
Work Completed: Shock absorbers and springs replaced with air suspension. Front wings replaced. Missing side skirts replaced. Rusted panels on right-side C-pillar patched. Full body respray from black to Sugar Apple Green with white top; custom gold plate pinstriping added. New white vinyl headliner, door cards, and seat upholstery with green piping. Dashboard refurbished and painted to body colour. Chrome bumpers, grille and brightwork polished; hubcaps painted in body colour. Notes: Purchased from Culver City, California. Restoration price includes £2,000 shipping. Replacement body panels purchased from a junkyard. Missing right rear window, front right flashing light and trunk lock replaced, but not mentioned. Restored car brought to the Rally of the Giants at Blenheim Palace, the UK's largest American classic car gathering. Sold at asking price. Most expensive restoration cost in the series to date.
-	-	Final totals	£103,000	£91,730	£162,653	£215,950	£53,207	-	

=== Series 11 (2014) ===
No. overall	No. in series	Vehicle	Budget	Purchase price	Final cost after restoration	Final selling price	Profit/loss	Original release date	UK viewers (million)
Part I
88	1	1983 Ford Fiesta XR2	£3,000	£2,000	£2,750	£5,000	+£2,250	17 March 2014	0.28
Work Completed: Gearbox overhaul performed and gear stick throw shortened from 200 mm to 130 mm, replaced the front suspension bushes, fitted a new clutch, faded black window surrounds repainted and a metal fracture welded up and minor rust treated on the window frame, parcel shelf from the donor car refurbished with new paint, carpeting and hanger strings. Rear interior quarter panels, front bumper, and nearside front spotlight replaced with parts from the donor car and aftermarket exhaust replaced with original part. Notes: Mike spent £1,000 on a donor car for all the spare parts the project car needed; donor car was resold for £873. Restored car brought to Colin Stancombe of Ford Special Vehicles Engineering. Edd ran the car from 0–60 in 10.5 seconds—slightly more than one second slower than the original factory rating of 9.3 seconds. Buying the car was filmed twice as Mike damaged the front of the XR2 driving into the camera car while filming.
89	2	1996 Porsche 911/993 Targa	£15,000	£12,000	£17,520	£19,500	+£1,980	24 March 2014	TBC
Work Completed: Engine performance problem resolved by replacing one of the VarioRam lifters in the intake manifold, shock absorbers replaced with custom-made coilovers complete with Wheeler Dealers logos on top of the strut mounts, brake backing plates and suspension drop links replaced, faulty rear spoiler mechanism fixed by replacing broken crown wheel, leather steering wheel, gear knob & gaiter, and rear lights replaced with salvage parts, new tailpipes, clear fog lamps and indicators, and halogen headlamp bulbs installed, alloys fully refurbished & new tyres installed, body given a deep cut and polish and both front and rear number plates replaced. Notes: Restored car taken to Yorkshire Dales to participate in a Porsche 911 club drive-out. The leather interior was significantly worn on purchase and not attended to during the restoration; however, it had been restored when the car was sold. The custom suspension came at a cost of £3,000.
90	3	1995 Mazda RX-7	£8,000	£5,000	£8,025	£9,500	+£1,475	31 March 2014	0.25
Work Completed: New radiator and intercooler kit. Faulty aircon assembly removed and battery relocated to the boot. New ECU installed; engine remapped from 247 bhp to 296 bhp. Original BBS alloy wheels repainted in orange with snake skin water transfer pattern; spoiler and side mirror covers also decorated with snake skin pattern. Added matching "snake skin fade spots" vinyl decals to body. Notes: JDM import with Mazdaspeed body kit, aftermarket spoiler of unknown origin, Pivot water temperature gauge and A'PEXi turbo timer. Engine was rebuilt by original owner roughly 10,000 miles prior to sale. Restored car taken to Anglesey Circuit for track testing with a local Mazda Wankel club. Sold back to original seller. First Japanese car featured since series 9.
91	4	1958 Citroën 2CV AZLP	£6,000	€4,000 £3,300	£6,300	£10,000	+£3,700	7 April 2014	0.18
Work Completed: Engine rebuilt with new barrels and pistons. New suspension cylinders installed, new leading-arm friction dampers installed, tuned mass damper refilled with LHM oil and the housing cleaned and resprayed satin black. Body resprayed in period satin blue. Interior refurbished with new seat covers and door panels. Steel steering wheel, seat frames and wheels repainted in original gray. Refurbished soft top installed. New headlamp pods and taillight lenses installed. Notes: Purchased from Biarritz, France. Restoration price includes £200 travel expenses. Restored car taken to a ploughed farm field to test Citroën's original claim of the body and suspension being able to keep a basket of eggs intact while in motion before going to Chateau Impney.
92	5	2000 Maserati 3200 GT	£10,000	£7,000	£8,632*	£12,300	+£3,668	14 April 2014	0.23
Work Completed: Accelerator pedal position sensor replaced, throttle body refurbished (carbon track replaced with a magnet-based non contact system) air conditioning serviced; new heat exchanger and dryer fitted, engine oil and oil filter replaced, front track rod ends replaced, instrument binnacle fixed, mismatched tyres replaced and new wheelweights fitted, driver airbag unit and gear knob replaced. Notes: Purchased from Edinburgh, Scotland. Restored car taken from Morecambe to Scarborough, North Yorkshire (through York), as part of a shoestring cross-country drive. Throttle body refurbished by The Maserati Shed; * £475 for replacement accelerator pedal position sensor missed from final financial summary. Spelling mistake made in final financial summary: the car was listed as Masarati instead of Maserati.
93	6	1968 Chevrolet Camaro	£10,000	US$11,750 £7,500	£14,030	£23,000	+£8,970	21 April 2014	0.13
Work Completed: New gearbox oil sump, gasket and filter, wiring loom sorted, braking system upgraded with brake servo and new master cylinder, new power steering mechanism; alternator moved to the opposite side of the engine to make room for the power steering pump, non-authentic "SS" badges replaced with original or blank units; "SS" badges on the wings resprayed in Le Mans Blue to cover up the holes, new binnacle lenses, car stereo, door cards and headlining, windshield wipers and new chrome wheel trim, new chrome wheel arch trim, new bonnet vent and new chrome headlight surrounds. Notes: Purchased from San Diego, California. Restoration price includes £2,500 shipping and travel expenses. Original straight-six engine was swapped with an Edelbrock 350 cid V8. Previous owner abandoned restoration project, but supplied the old and replacement parts with the car. Restored car taken to the Ace Cafe London to be sold at a car meet. Sold at asking price.
94	7	1967 Amphicar 770	£20,000	US$35,000 £21,000	£30,600	£35,200	+£4,600	28 April 2014	0.24
Work Completed: Bodywork repaired: original paint stripped using soda blasting method to address all of the corroded areas and remove body filler from previous repairs; old fibreglass floor repair panels removed, rusted offside floor panel cutout and replaced with new metal; rusted front offside floor corner and corner bracket were cut out and new metal panels were welded in; offside rear three quarter panel and inner panel cutout and new metal panels welded in; fitted a new bonnet, body resprayed to original red colour, old aftermarket bilge pump and float switch replaced with new aftermarket parts and relocated to the centre of the chassis for more efficient draining, bilge pump outlet hole relocated from rear offside to the original hole in the rear and plastic outlet fitting replaced with chrome equivalent (keeping the original with the car should the new owner want to switch), to make the car legal to operate in public waters, marine-spec fuel lines with protective sheath, external fuel filler cap and breather pipe with protective gauze, modified the original fuel tank with waterproof sealant and relocated the fuel takeoff and filler, fuel shutoff valve, electric kill switch, warning labels to show where the various safety features are located, fire extinguisher and waterproof battery case were fitted, new marine boards in the front compartment fitted to replace non-standard carpets and wooden oars with "Amphicar" label were custom made, first motion shaft bearing replaced (not shown). Notes: Purchased from Tavares, Florida. Restored car taken to the River Thames. Restoration price includes £2,500 shipping and travel expenses. During the test drive, the car stalled and had to be towed back to land, it was revealed that the first motion shaft bearing had been shredded and was replaced by Edd in the workshop (not shown). Sold to a buyer from the Netherlands.
Part II
95	8	1957 Ford Thunderbird	US$25,000 £16,326	US$24,500 £16,000	£25,120	£33,000	+£7,880	1 September 2014	0.17
Work Completed: Manual windows upgraded to power windows, replaced seals in leaking power steering control valve and new power steering hoses installed, retrofitted optional Dial-o-Matic power seats, creme seat covers replaced with black/creme covers, new soft top added, front and rear bumpers and front grille rechromed, smaller chrome trims replaced with new parts. Bodywork colour-sanded and polished. Faulty fuel sender unit replaced. Notes: Purchased from Sonoma, California. Restoration price includes £2,500 shipping. The power window system was installed shortly after purchase. Restored car taken to Dunsfold for display at a grand car show. Sold to a buyer who was looking for a car to use for his wedding (The buyer's wedding pictures were later shown at the end credits). The car's seat cover was incorrectly replaced, as the VIN plate indicates that the car is equipped originally with the Creme seat covers rather than the Black/Creme covers.
96	9	1976 Jaguar XJ-C 4.2 Coupe	£11,995	£11,500	£13,190	£15,000	+£1,810	8 September 2014	0.21
Work Completed: Replaced grumbling bearing in the water pump. Replaced exhaust manifold with refurbished and ceramic coated unit. Replaced mechanical ignition system with an electronic unit. Fixed non-working fan in the cooling jacket for the battery. Replaced exhaust system with a stainless steel unit. Repaired non-working lock-nut on the adjustable reach of the steering column.
97	10	2001 Audi TT	£1,950	£1,500	£2,153.50	£3,600	+£1,446.50	15 September 2014	0.23
Work Completed: Replaced sheared-off rivet in gearbox selector fork with a nylon nut and bolt. New clutch installed. Haldex-coupling oil and filter replaced. Replaced multifunction display in the instrument cluster due to dead pixels. New switches for the passenger side window installed. Clouded headlights replaced with aftermarket units. Notes: Bought with a faulty 6-speed manual gearbox that could not select first and second gear. The rivet for the selector fork sheared off, but did not get into the gears. Edd fixed it by putting in bolt and nylon nut instead of a new rivet. Edd usually does not work on gearboxes, but as there was obviously something big broken he tried fixing it himself, got lucky and replaced just a bolt for 50 pence. A new replacement gearbox would have cost £4,000, which was way over budget. Took the completed car on a test drive to Xscape indoor ski slope in Central Milton Keynes.
98	11	1967 Volkswagen Type 2 Split-Screen	US$14,800 £9,500	US$14,000 £8,950	£16,665	£25,000	+£8,335	22 September 2014	0.23
Work Completed: Steering mechanism upgraded with rack-and-pinion setup. Steel wheels widened for "deep dish" look and painted black with white centre and fitted with chrome half moon hubcaps. Gear selector shaft refurbished with new bushings and painted satin black; gear selector upgraded with a quick shifter. Chrome brightwork with red piping added to accent the black bodywork. Window tint film removed; black window frames replaced with new aluminium units and chrome window catches recommissioned. Black painted bumpers replaced with chrome units. Black painted front headlight & indicator surrounds replaced with chrome units. New chrome windscreen wipers fitted. New chrome door mirrors fitted. New chrome front & rear VW badges installed. Interior resprayed from black to white. Creme vinyl interior panels and grey carpeting added. Aftermarket bucket seats replaced with white vinyl twin bench seats. New steering wheel installed, retro style radio & chrome aerial, vintage clock and chrome ashtray installed to fill holes on the dashboard. US-spec rear lights replaced with UK-spec units. Notes: Purchased from Greenville, South Carolina. Restoration price includes £2,000 shipping. Sold at asking price.
99	12	1989 BMW Z1	£15,000	€16,550 £14,037	£19,154	£25,000	+£5,846	29 September 2014	0.27
Work Completed: Yellow leather seats, gear stick and handbrake gaiters dyed black. Clutch plate and release bearing replaced. Exhaust replaced with a custom made system. Door belt re-tensioned to fix drop-down door mechanism. Missing indicator stalk found under the passenger seat, welded and re-attached. Body Panels resprayed in Top Red (The original colour that Edd discovered under the Canary Yellow colour while removing the panels). Rubber seals replaced. Notes: Purchased from the Netherlands. Restoration price includes £350 shipping. Car was trailered back to the UK, as it was not road registered. Restored car sold at asking price.
100	13	1903 Darracq Type L	Not for Sale	£0	£1,517	Not for Sale	-£1,517	6 October 2014	0.24
Work Completed: Water pump refurbished with new impellers and shaft built from scratch. Radiator cleaned up; rubber hoses and clamps replaced and waterless coolant added. One wooden wheel retyred by the Royal Wheelwright. Replica inserts of the external oil-lamp headlamps made with a 3D printer to accommodate modern H7 LED bulbs. Notes: Car was obtained from Haynes International Motor Museum. Used to celebrate 100th car in the show, this veteran car was not for sale. Restored car taken on the London to Brighton Veteran Car Run. It suffered an oil leak and a sooted spark plug, but managed to finish the 64-mile run. Oldest car in the series.
101	14	1963 Lincoln Continental	£10,000	US$8,000 £4,696	£13,076	£15,000	+£1,924	13 October 2014	0.20
Work Completed: New oil sump gasket. New 17" 150-spoke wire wheels with adaptors. Fixed leaking vacuum reservoir by spot-welding holes and re-welding broken bracket to address problematic central locking system. Bumpers and exterior brightwork rechromed. Interior wood inlays replaced with laser cut aluminium panels with wood effect wetransfer. Body resprayed from white to Ford Roman Bronze. Seats reupholstered in Creme leather. Notes: Purchased from Sacramento, California. Restoration price includes £2,000 shipping. Original owner spent US$10,000 on rebuilding the engine. Sold at asking price.
-	-	Final totals	£102,271	£114,483	£178,732.50	£231,100	£53,884.50	-	

=== Series 12 (2015) ===
Series 12 was split between Wheeler Dealers' new workshops in Huntington Beach, California, and the UK.

No. overall	No. in series	Vehicle	Budget	Purchase price	Final cost after restoration	Final selling price	Profit/loss	Original release date	UK viewers (million)
Part I
102	1	1965 Pontiac GTO	US$25,000 £15,400	US$25,000 £15,400	US$28,200 £17,500	US$32,000 £19,700	+US$4,200 +£2,500	23 March 2015	0.26
Work Completed: New uprated aluminium radiator with electric fan, water pump and thermostat installed. Power steering box refurbished and repainted. Air conditioning system reinstated; however, original compressor and condenser supplied by the seller, could not be used because of damage and were replaced with aftermarket units. Aftermarket wooden steering wheel replaced with period correct leather unit. Wooly suspension fixed by tightening loose nut on suspension arm. Damaged right side exhaust downpipe welded with new pipe and realigned to match the height of the left side. Non-functioning tachometer and fuel gauge replaced with new aftermarket ones. Notes: Purchased from Johnsburg, Illinois. Car was originally from California and had its engine swapped with a 1967 400-cubic-inch (6.6 L) triple carburettor V8 that generates 400 bhp. Restored car taken to Borrego Springs, California.
103	2	1951 Ford F-1	US$5,000 £3,061	US$4,500 £2,755	US$14,484 £9,296	US$20,000 £12,729	+US$5,516 +£3,433	30 March 2015	0.16
Work Completed: The 3.9 L (240 in^{3}) Flathead V8 engine cleaned and upgraded with new aluminium heads, new inlet manifold, new four barrel carburettor and new tubular exhaust manifold. Engine bay resprayed in original teal colour. Electrical system converted from 6V to 12V. Four speed non-synchronous transmission upgraded to a modern automatic unit. Custom gear linkage mechanism fitted to link the original column shifter. New exhaust system fitted. Custom "Mike & Edd" logo hand painted on both doors. Custom aluminium windshield sun visor made. Body painted in certain areas in original teal to create a rat rod look, then sealed with clear coat. Wheeler Dealers logo etched onto vent windows, using sparks from an angle grinder and some tubing . Vinyl seats and sun visors reupholstered with real cowhide. Steel wheels repainted in original teal colour and white wall tyres fitted. Notes: Purchased from Everett, Washington. Finished truck was taken to Twin Peaks, California, to participate in a rat rod cruise. Sold to a buyer from the UK.
104	3	1959 MGA	US$15,000 £9,029	US$14,000 £8,427	US$24,950 £16,161	US$35,000 £22,671	+US$10,050 +£6,510	6 April 2015	0.15
Work Completed: Engine oil seal and crankshaft ring replaced with larger units with the engine plate modified to accommodate them. Engine and engine bay was degreased. Boot cleaned of surface rust and repainted with stone chip undercoating. Rusted body panels replaced. Body resprayed from white to original black color. New front drum brakes. Steel wheels replaced with wire wheels; new hubs installed to accommodate them. Brightwork rechromed; new indicator light housings and MG badges. Original red leather interior reupholstered in tan leather. Faded wooden dashboard wrapped in leather; speedo and rev counter replaced with second-hand units. New interior door pulls. New wooden steering wheel. Notes: Purchased from a classic car dealership in East Los Angeles, California. Originally thought to be a 1500 variant, the engine was discovered by Edd to be a rebuilt 1600cc single-cam unit. Edd opted to replace the rev counter and speedo with used ones to match the patina of the existing gauges. Restored car brought to Hollywood Hills for a cruise. Sold at asking price. Later the same restored MG is seen in a short clip on another Discovery Channel show at a classic auto shop in the UK.
105	4	1974 BMW 2002 tii	US$10,000 £6,439	US$7,750 £4,990	US$21,450 £13,813	US$35,000 £23,415	+US$13,550 +£9,065	13 April 2015	0.25
Work Completed: New fuel pump and hoses. New battery, condenser, rotor arm, UHT leads and distributor cap. Engine serviced with new spark plugs and fluids. Fuel injector retaining screws refurbished with new O-rings. Kugelfischer pump reconditioned. Brake system overhauled with new master cylinder, front discs, pads, hoses, and rear drums and shoes. Full body respray in original color. New driver's side mirror and BMW badges installed. US-spec bumpers replaced with original Euro-spec units. Front seats replaced with refurbished Recaro units. Original steering wheel replaced with Nardi unit. Notes: Originally a non-running unit that had not been used for 17 years. Seller advertised it for US$5,975, but due to high demand from collectors, Mike bought it for US$7,750. Majority of the replacement parts purchased at a classic BMW car meet. Restored car taken to BMW's US headquarters in Spartanburg, South Carolina, where it was test driven before being sold to a Florida buyer.
106	5	1975 AMC Pacer	US$5,000 £3,059	US$3,500 £2,141	US$12,750 £8,096	US$7,857 £4,989	-US$4,893 -£3,107	20 April 2015	0.27
Work Completed: Ride height lowered by 50mm with custom front springs and rear aluminium spacer blocks. Replaced automatic gear selector cable with fishing line. Full body vinyl wrap in light grey with a white hexagon pattern, reflective lines, and clear glitter. Brown interior panels refurbished in grey using a flocking process. New grey carpeting. Original seats reupholstered in off-white artificial suede. New headlamps with LED angel eye rings. New black alloy wheels. Notes: Purchased from San Jose, California. Restored car taken to the Reno, Nevada, for its test drive before being put on an online charity auction.
107	6	1972 Datsun 240Z	US$10,000 £6,480	US$8,000 £5,184	US$11,750 £7,917	US$16,750 £11,287	+US$5,000 +£3,370	27 April 2015	0.30
Work Completed: Automatic gearbox swapped with a 5-speed manual from a later 280Z. Camshaft reprofiled, carburettors rebuilt and performance exhaust added to improve engine performance. New chrome camshaft cover added. Notes: Purchased from a Cars & Coffee event in Irvine, California. Mike was initially searching for a manual 240Z but was unable to find one within budget. Restored car taken to Willow Springs Raceway for its test drive. Sold at asking price.
108	7	1973 Volkswagen 181 Thing	US$10,000 £6,380	US$8,000 £5,104	US$12,543 £8,240	US$15,750 £10,352	+US$3,207 +£2,112	4 May 2015	0.26
Work Completed: Refurbished side windows and seats. Replaced the spark plugs and leads, electronic ignition installed, heater thermostatic switch and fuel damper replaced. Original exhaust replaced with a stainless steel system. Front drum brakes upgraded to disc brakes. Hole in bumpers patched up; bumpers powder coated in black. Notes: Purchased from Oregon at the seller's asking price. Formerly an automotive museum piece from California. Sold at asking price to a buyer in Japan.
109	8	1952 DeSoto Firedome 8	US$15,000 £9,599	US$12,500 £7,999	US$17,000 £10,710	US$23,000 £14,811	+US$6,000 +£3,863	11 May 2015	0.23
Work Completed: Flat silver painted bumpers and brightwork rechromed. Cylinder heads refurbished with new valve guides, seats and polished valves, resulting in a gain of 30 bhp. Added remote controlled door opening mechanism and poppers to compensate for the shaved door handles; new 8 volt battery added for the mechanism. The window tint was removed. New steel wheels with chrome hubcaps and whitewall tyres. Notes: Purchased from Charlotte, North Carolina. Customised vehicle with the door handles shaved off. Restoration price includes US$750 credit from selling the aftermarket alloy wheels. Restored car taken to California's Wine Country for its test drive. Placed on consignment to a classic car dealer, as Mike headed back to Europe.
-	-	Final totals (Part I)	US$90,500 £59,447	US$76,550 £52,325	US$143,127 £91,733	US$185,357 £119,954	US$42,630 £27,746	-	
Part II
110	10	1973 Rover P5B	£5,000	£3,850	£6,212	£11,500	+£5,288	17 August 2015	0.22
Work Completed: Power steering gearbox rebuilt, steering lock stops made to prevent damage to the steering box in the future, cast iron exhaust manifolds replaced with custom made stainless steel tubular exhaust manifolds, new set of interior felt carpets made, front passenger seat backrest adjust lever tightened up so the backrest stays upright, leather seats cleaned.
111	11	1989 Fiat Panda 4x4	£1,000	£1,331	£1,800	£2,500	+£700	24 August 2015	0.33
Work Completed: Replaced gearbox linkages and bushes, sump guard added for protection, snorkel intake installed, seats replaced to racing seats with harnesses, original stickers removed, exterior resprayed with textured polyurethane rubber paint, new wheels and tyres, hand-painted badges. Notes: Bought from an internet auction. The seats and harnesses were free, since Edd used old units from the Volkswagen Type 2 project (Series 11, episode 11). The off-road tyres were made from recycled ones in Germany. Restored car taken to an off-road testing site in York to test its abilities.
112	12	1982 Alfa Romeo Alfasud 1.5 TI	£5,000	£4,830	£5,797	£6,800	+£1,003	31 August 2015	0.30
Work Completed: Cambelt and water pump replaced, full service performed, brake discs and pads replaced, rear suspension bushes replaced with polyurethane units, rust patch replaced with new metal, exhaust system replaced. Notes: Rare Ti variant, only 50 of which are registered in the UK. Purchased from an auction in Norfolk. Engine had not been serviced for 17 years. Mike previously wanted to sell the car for £8,000 during a radio talk show, but then he backed up and advertised the car for £7,250.
113	13	2011 Caterham 7	£15,000	£16,500	£20,425	£22,500	+£2,075	7 September 2015	0.39
Work Completed: Standard flywheel replaced with lightweight unit, standard air filter replaced with a bigger airbox, standard exhaust heat shield replaced with handmade Inconel unit, ECU remapped, standard floor pan replaced with longer and deeper unit, racing seats replaced with more comfortable units, toggle switch starter system installed, full respray from black to lime green with black stripes, rear light lenses replaced with clear units and LED bulbs installed, mudguards replaced with carbon fibre units, exhaust polished, grille resprayed in Kawasaki green, and new Caterham badge installed. Notes: Car was a former factory drift racer demonstrator that was not road legal. At the end of the episode, the car had been registered on the road as a brand-new 2014 model year car. Restoration costs include £200 credit from selling the racing seats. Restored car taken to Portmeirion, North Wales, to pay homage to the TV series The Prisoner, which featured the Caterham 7's predecessor, the Lotus Seven.
114	14	1978 Ford Escort Mk2	£10,000	£6,750	£12,350	£12,999	+£649	14 September 2015	0.40
Work Completed: Suspension strut mount and bulkhead strengthened, engine bay and interior repainted, sound deadening removed, roll cage fitted, straight cut gearbox fitted, rally spec aluminium fuel tank and dual electric fuel pumps installed, FIA-approved fire extinguishing system installed, competition-spec center console installed, new footrest for navigator fitted, competition bucket seats fitted, new steering wheel fitted, rally-spec mudguards fitted, rally tyres and wheels fitted, door stickers and windshield stickers installed, exhaust system replaced, twin carburettors and strut brace installed. Notes: Car was originally a 1.3-litre left-hand drive Ghia model from the Netherlands that had been converted into an RS2000 both cosmetically and mechanically by a workshop specialising in rally car conversion. Purchase price includes the competition-spec straight cut gearbox. Restoration costs includes £500 fee for Mike and Edd to obtain their rallying licenses. Restored car taken to Walters Arena rally stage in Wales for a small competition between Mike and Edd.
115	15	1957 Messerschmitt KR200	£17,995	£17,000	£22,271	£25,000	+£2,729	21 September 2015	0.29
Work Completed: Cylinder head cleaned and new head gasket fitted, full service performed, hubcaps replaced, aftermarket leather canopy replaced with correct clear dome, engine casing polished, crease on the rear mudguard bent back to shape, welded and patched, full respray from mint green to red and white, new chrome bits fitted to upgrade the car to Deluxe model, whitewall tires fitted, aftermarket air filter and exhaust system replaced with original units, engine bay cleaned, interior retrimmed, period correct switch installed, brightwork polished. Notes: Bought to celebrate Messerschmitt KR200's 60th anniversary. Pre-fitted with aftermarket canopy roof. Edd broke the clear dome during trimming, requiring Mike to purchase another one, which was the last unit available in the country according to Edd. Restored car taken to a Messerschmitt gathering. Sold at asking price to a Swedish buyer who sent his daughter over to the UK to take a look at the car.
116	16	1956 Citroën HY Van	£6,000	£4,500	£19,000	£23,000	+£4,000	28 September 2015	0.35
Work Completed: Standard engine swapped with 2.1L Ford unit, trafficators refurbished by repainting the housing and replacing the original trafficators with larger British ones with LEDs, rusty bodywork treated and resprayed to white, standard transmission swapped with synchromesh unit from later HY Van, inverter charger, auxiliary battery and additional 240V electronics fitted, additional support braces, insulation and hygienic panels installed, headlight bulbs changed with modern units, interior refurbished, modern seat belts fitted and wheels refurbished. Notes: Purchased from a collector in southern France as a barn find that was used as a commercial vehicle. The replacement Ford engine is a bored-out 2.0-litre engine from a Ford Transit. Converted into a modern commercial vehicle. Restored van taken to a garlic farm on the Isle of Wight.
117	17	1992 Volkswagen Corrado VR6	£1,500	£1,200	£2,860	£5,500	+£2,640	5 October 2015	0.39
Work Completed: Replaced ABS sensors on all four wheels, new brake pads and discs fitted, ABS pump rebuilt, oil cooler seals and oil filter replaced, broken sunroof replaced, fabric interior swapped with second hand leather units, radiator grille replaced, faded VR6 badge restored using vinyl stickers, Volkswagen Lupo wiper arms fitted, Speedline wheels refurbished and new tyres fitted. Notes: The seller sold the car on behalf of his uncle. Restored car taken to a go-kart track in Milton Keynes for a test drive. Sold at £500 over the asking price.
118	18	2003 Honda S2000	£5,000	£3,000	£4,380	£7,000	+£2,620	12 October 2015	0.41
Work Completed: Faulty oxygen sensor replaced, oil seals and O-rings replaced to fix the VTEC issue, wheels refurbished, corroded EPS rack replaced, rusted metal engine brackets refurbished using vapor blasting method, rusted alarm casing replaced, cam cover refurbished, faded headlamp lenses grounded, sanded and polished, headlight washer pump replaced, aftermarket stereo head unit and gear shift knob replaced with factory units. Notes: Rare Imola Orange colour. Previous owner wanted to restore it but gave up, according to Mike. Bought back by the previous owner at £500 over the asking price.
119	19	2002 Noble M12 GTO 2.5	£22,000	£21,500	£24,574	£27,000	+£2,426	19 October 2015	0.40
Work Completed: Twin turbochargers reconditioned to fix oil leak, intercooler cleaned, electronic boost controller installed, ECU remapped to increase the turbos' boost, uprated oil sump and removable crossmember installed to replace a piece of factory crossmember that Edd cut, oil filter replaced, oil catch tank replaced, broken plastic heater casing replaced with aluminium casing, non-standard gear shift gaiter and handbrake gaiter replaced with Alcantara-finished units, aftermarket steering wheel replaced with factory MOMO unit. Notes: Purchased in Italy, but the seller's agent advertised the car as located in London. Purchase price includes the pre-made aluminium casing for the uninstalled heater. Previous owner fitted functional custom sidepods. Restored car taken to Millbrook Proving Ground in Bedfordshire for handling and top speed test, it achieved 170 mph on the oval track. Sold at asking price.
-	-	Final totals (Part II)	£88,495	£80,461	£119,669	£143,799	£24,130	-	

=== Series 13 (2016–17) ===
Series 13 is the first series to include the labour time in the on-screen tabulation, and is set completely in the US workshop.

No. overall	No. in series	Vehicle	Budget	Purchase price	Final cost after restoration	Final selling price	Profit/loss	Original release date	Viewers (millions)
Part I
120	1	1987 Mercedes-Benz 560SL	US$15,000 £10,000	US$6000 £4,154	US$13,930 £9,643	US$21,000 £14,500	+US$7,070 +£4,894	9 May 2016	44
Work Completed: Fuel injectors replaced, timing chain and plastic chain guides replaced, HVAC air vent vacuum actuators replaced, heater box repaired, cracked dashboard reupholstered in German vinyl, leather seats recovered, center console veneer panels replaced, front suspension refurbished with new shocks, lowered springs and new anti-roll bar end links, front suspension subframe mounting bushings replaced, aftermarket wheel arch chrome trim removed, US-spec bumpers and headlights replaced with Euro spec ones, period correct Lorinser LO wheels fitted. Notes: Car purchased in Los Angeles, California. During the episode, Mike and Edd made several references to the 1980 film American Gigolo, which featured a model similar to the car being restored. To source vacuum actuators, Mike visited the Mercedes Benz Classic Centre in Irvine, California. Restored car taken to Autobooks-Aerobooks in Burbank, California, where Mike and Edd signed copies of the Wheeler Dealers Car Restoration Manual. (For legal reasons, the store signs were blurred out.)
121	2	1963 Volvo PV544	US$10,000 £6,700	US$9,000 £6,000	US$11,642 £8,000	US$14,500 £9,700	+US$2,858 +£1,700	16 May 2016	28
Work Completed: Rebuilt and tuned the dual carburettors, suspension bushings and clutch linkage bushings replaced, Kevlar brake shoes fitted, aftermarket but period correct air conditioning fitted. Notes: Purchased in San Francisco, California. Previous owner had restored the exterior and interior and kept it garaged, as he was unable to find a mechanic to properly tune the dual carburettors.
122	3	1977 Honda CVCC	US$3,000 £2,000	US$2,000 £1,300	US$6,200 £4,000	US$14,000 £9,500	+US$8,000 +£5,500	23 May 2016	26
Work Completed: Engine rebuilt and retuned, rusted area on the bottom right rear wing replaced with new sheet metal, full body respray to original yellow colour, installed oxygen sensor and tyre pressure monitor, new four-gauge dashboard pod made by fusing two units together, added vacuum and air/fuel ratio gauges. Notes: Purchased in Los Angeles. During the episode, Mike learned the basics of hypermiling in a 2016 Honda Civic sedan. Restored car taken to a 90-mile hypermiling drive with only two gallons of petrol; the test fell short of one mile due to Mike not factoring his and Edd's combined weight on his calculations. Full body respray done at Universal Technical Institute. Sold to Honda Motors USA automotive museum to be used as a museum display.
123	4	1980 Chevrolet LUV	US$2,000 £1,300	US$1,000 £670	US$2,555 £1,703	US$3,500 £2,300	+US$945 +£597	30 May 2016	31
Work Completed: Dents removed using various methods of dent removal, hole in bed patched, air shocks installed, oil seals replaced, new audio kit with Bluetooth connectivity installed, dashboard fixed by re-upholstering it in new vinyl and installation of a dashboard cap, USB power outlets and WiFi dongle installed, interior reupholstered, new bench seats installed, brightwork polished and underbody cleaned. Notes: Purchased in Northern California. Previous owner had a new engine installed. Mike originally wanted to install an air bag suspension but found the kit too expensive, so he opted for air shocks with air compressor and pressure gauge with control valves. Edd introduced two methods of paintless dent removal: electromagnetic dent removal and hot glue dent removal. Most of the exterior left unchanged to keep the patina. Restored car brought to a farm while carrying spent grains to test the air suspension. Sold to Old 99 Brewery Co.
124	5	1988 Ford Mustang 5.0 Convertible	US$2,500 £1,700	US$2,500 £1,700	US$7,335 £5,000	US$9,200 £6,130	+US$1,865 +£1,130	6 June 2016	25
Work Completed: Limited slip differential fixed with new friction plates, geared down final drive to increase acceleration, speedometer re-adjusted, suspensions and whole exhaust assembly replaced, performance exhaust manifolds, air filter and throttle body installed, smaller pulleys installed to minimize power loss and increase performance, new tinted headlights fitted, new tyres and rims installed, and body resprayed to original black colour with red trim. Notes: Purchased from a car dealer in Southern California. Restored car taken to Irwindale Speedway for a drag race, where it did an eighth-mile in 10.8 seconds at 64 mph.
125	6	1963 Chevrolet Corvair Convertible	US$1,500 £1,000	US$2,000 £1,300	US$11,345 £7,563	US$18,000 £12,000	+US$6,655 +£4,437	13 June 2016	47
Work Completed: Pushrod tube seals and gasket replaced to fix oil leaks, engine cleaned and powder coated, interior overhauled, convertible soft top replaced, brightwork replaced, new wheels and tyres installed, full respray from white to Seafoam Green, suspension bushes and ball joints replaced, springs and shocks replaced, compensator bar installed, new exhaust installed, added remote controlled door opening mechanism which includes alarm, GPS tracker and a smartphone application to compensate for the shaved door handles. Notes: High-performance Monza Spyder variant with a 2.7-litre engine. Purchased at an impound lot with a suspected accident history. Purchase price includes free towing to the garage. Sold at asking price. In episode 9, it was revealed that the final test drive scene had to be re-shot due to a faulty steering column.
126	7	1965 Land Rover Series IIA	US$10,000 £6,700	US$8,000 £5,300	US$15,176 £10,117	US$19,000 £12,700	+US$3,824 +£2,583	20 June 2016	68
Work Completed: Chassis cleaned, surface rust removed, and repainted, wheels repainted, engine detailed, generator replaced with alternator, new brake lines installed, brakes readjusted, new suspensions installed, solar power system with inverter kit and additional 12-volt battery installed, hard top and side windows installed, roof-mounted tent and additional braces installed, water purification system installed, winch installed, paint sanded to give a camouflage look. Notes: Purchased in Los Angeles; seller was absent during time of purchase. Mike named the car "Henry". Built as a survival vehicle. Restored car taken to Salton Sea to test the new gadgets. Sold to an anonymous buyer who did not want to be seen on camera.
127	8	1968 Chevrolet Corvette C3 Convertible	US$20,000 £13,300	US$19,500 £13,000	US$21,530 £14,353	US$26,000 £17,300	+US$4,470 +£2,947	29 June 2016	21
Work Completed: Electronic ignition fitted, carburettor re-jetted and rebuilt, valve stem oil seals replaced, hydraulic valve lifters re-adjusted, original brake calipers refurbished, brake discs replaced, non-working wiper actuators fixed, damaged passenger side wing repaired and resprayed, custom steering wheel fitted. Notes: Purchased in Katy, Texas. Previous owner swapped the original engine with a 327-cubic-inch unit from a 1967–1968 Chevrolet Camaro and replaced the convertible top. Restored car taken to a dry lake bed, where Edd drove it at 100 mph and Mike took it on a high-speed slalom test. Sold at US$1,000 above asking price.
Part II
128	10	1970 Ford Bronco Series 1	US$12,000 £8,000	US$8,000 £5,300	US$25,404 £20,000	US$40,000 £26,700	+US$14,596 +£6,700	14 November 2016	278
Work Completed: "Three on the tree" manual column gearbox replaced with 4-speed automatic gearbox with tilt steering and new steering wheel, new front locking hubs, replacement body painted in Sequoia Brown installed; with new power master cylinder, new prop shafts, new 2.5" lift kit, new headliner and carpet, new dashboard trim with modern Bluetooth stereo unit, front drum brakes upgraded to vented discs, new engine cooling system, new alloy wheels and tyres, new rollbar and upholstery, new brightwork. Notes: Original owner did a partial restoration on the chassis and suspension. Parts purchased from Tom's Bronco Parts in Medford, Oregon. New body is a 1972 model that was abandoned after its original owner was unable to pay for the US$4,000 restoration job. Restored car taken to a forest to test its off-road capabilities. Sold at asking price.
129	11	1983 Mercedes-Benz 500 SEC	US$5,000 £3,000	US$2,500 £1,700	US$10,162 £7,000	US$16,000 £10,700	+US$5,838 +£3,700	21 November 2016	79
Work Completed: New suspension parts, new 560 SEC vented brake discs and twin-cylinder calipers, cylinder heads refurbished with larger ports, new camshaft, stainless steel valves, rocker arms and valve spring retainers, AMG C126 fibreglass wide body kit, full body respray, Magnaflow AMG replica exhaust system with new x-pipe muffler, new AMG alloy wheels and tyres, new interior wood panels, AMG tan leather seats and upholstery. Notes: Euro-spec grey market vehicle, customised into an AMG tribute car. Final cost does not include the body kit and wheels, which were valued at US$15,000. Sold at asking price to the owner of the AMG parts.
130	12	1976 Porsche 912E	US$27,000 £20,000	US$25,000 £18,000	US$31,016 £23,000	US$35,001 £25,500	+US$3,985 +£2,500	28 November 2016	24
Work Completed: New fuel injectors and regulator valve, air flow sensor refurbished, ride height lowered to Euro-spec, new rear suspension adjustment kit, air conditioning reinstated with second-hand parts, black satin trim replaced with second-hand chrome brightwork, new headlights with beauty rings. Steel wheels replaced with a set of Porsche Fuchs alloy wheels. Notes: Rare variant with factory sunroof and air conditioning, which was removed by the previous owner. Purchased from a Mercedes-BMW dealership with Porsche Fuchs alloy wheels thrown in. Restored car taken to Willow Springs Raceway Horse Thief Mile track.
131	13	1973 Chevrolet Camaro RS	US$20,000 £13,300	US$17,000 £11,000	US$32,281 £25,000	US$35,000 £23,000	+US$2,719 +£1,813	5 December 2016	53
Work Completed: Aftermarket pro-touring handling parts consisting of new set of brakes, new tubular steel A-arms, adjustable suspension kit, new tie rods and sway bar installed, rear drums converted to disc brakes, 3.73 Positraction limited-slip differential installed, stock 350 engine swapped with a 440 hp 383 crate engine, new exhaust installed, uprated Turbo-Hydramatic 350 transmission installed, new brake master cylinder and brake bias controller installed, aftermarket front splitter installed, rear ducktail spoiler installed, new wheels (18" front, 19" rear) and tyres with staggered fitment installed, black racing stripes applied, new steering wheel and shift knob installed. Notes: Purchased in La Habra, California. Previous owner had the car restored with new paint, new upholstery, and the engine rebuilt. Modified into Pro-Touring specifications. Sold at new buyer's initial offer.
132	14	1963 Sunbeam Alpine	US$8,000 £5,300	US$7,000 £4,526	US$12,373 £8,000	US$18,000 £12,000	+US$5,627 +£4,000	12 December 2016	32
Work Completed: Engine disassembled to discover possible Brabham-sourced modifications, exhaust manifold sandblasted and ceramic coated, cylinder head checked for cracks, ported, polished and skimmed, full body respray from black to Lake Blue, brightwork polished, old fuel tank replaced with modern, race-spec fuel cell, engine re-dressed, old dynamo replaced with custom-made alternator, interior refurbished with tan vinyl door cards and seats, wooden dashboard refinished, light bulbs replaced with LED units, and rear glass replaced with lightweight polycarbonate, Bluetooth speakers installed in favor of a radio. Notes: Purchased in Boston. Previously used as a race car, but left unused for 20 years afterwards. Seller provided some parts required for restoration. Standard engine previously swapped with a modified Hillman Minx unit. As the Sunbeam Alpine was famous for its appearance in Dr. No, several James Bond 007 film puns were thrown by Mike and Edd throughout the episode.
133	15	1992 Humvee	US$12,500 £8,000	US$12,500 £8,000	US$20,173 £13,450	US$25,000 £16,700	+US$4,827 +£3,250	2 January 2017	62
Work Completed: Ignition control module and temperature sensor unit replaced, gearbox mount replaced and prop shaft reattached, new aluminium camper top, installed water tank and heater, kitchen sink, stove, refrigerator, full-size bed, storage shelves for dining furniture, full body respray to matte black. Notes: Decommissioned unit purchased from a military compound, where much of the repair work was done. Truck was originally rebuilt in 2008 and the engine was replaced in 2011. Converted into an extreme camper. Restored truck taken to the California desert for hill climb testing. Sold at asking price to buyers from the Netherlands.
134	16	1985 Maserati Biturbo	US$ £	US$2,740 £1,827	US$22,481 £14,987	US$22,500 £15,000	+US$19 +£13	9 January 2017	57
Work Completed: Electric propulsion system renewed with more modern system consisting of 12 new battery packs, new AC brushless induction motors, new motor controllers, new radiators, new wiring and regenerative braking system, increasing power, torque and range, clutch assembly replaced, leather seats refreshed by oiling and conditioning, missing glove box installed, original graphite grey wheels and new tyres installed, dents repaired and resprayed. Notes: First electric car in the series. Purchased in Brisbane, California. Previous owner, who converted the car into an electric car in 1993 and had it garaged for the past 15 years, offered it for free, but Mike gave her a Boston to Montreal cruise package in return. Restored car taken to the Crescent Dunes solar power plant for its test drive, where it did 0–60 in 8.1 seconds. Sold at asking price.
135	17	1916 Cadillac Type 53 Roadster V8	US$60,000 £45,000	US$96,000 £64,000	US$133,908 £100,000	N/A	N/A	16 January 2017	271
Work Completed: New aluminium pistons and valve springs, chassis sandblasted and repainted, chassis bolts chrome plated, leaf springs refurbished, new spring bolts, new prop shaft, new custom exhaust, new running boards, full body respray to Green Stone, new windscreen, reupholstered leather seats and fitted heating pads to the seats, new floor palette and seat springs, train horn installed, installed engine and wheels from donor car. Notes: Mike and Edd's project for the Peking to Paris rally and to commemorate the 100th anniversary of the first V8 production car. Purchased in the UK for US$51,000 (£37,000) and flown to the US workshop. Engine rebuilt by Jenkinson Concours & Customs. Parts purchased from Dick Shappy Classic Cars in Rhode Island. As the engine was not ready for the rally, Mike ended up buying a 1918 Cadillac Type 57 for US$45,000 for spare parts. Restored car was unable to be race ready for the rally. Most expensive project in the series. This episode marks the final appearance of Edd China, as it was announced on 21 March 2017 that he had left the show.

=== Series 14 (2017–18) ===
Series 14 marks the debut of Ant Anstead as the programme's mechanic.

No. overall	No. in series	Vehicle	Budget	Purchase price	Final cost after restoration	Final selling price	Profit/loss	Original release date	Labour (man-hours)
Part I
136	1	1995 Ford Escort RS Cosworth	US$35,000 £27,000	US$30,000 £23,000	US$37,665 £28,500	US$50,000 £38,000	+US$12,335 +£9,500	5 October 2017	53
Work Completed: New oil sump rubber seals and gasket paste added. Turbocharger refurbished with new shaft and thrust bearings. New catalytic converter, clutch, brakes, brake pads, water reservoir and spoiler gasket. New Ford OZ Racing alloy wheels, powder coated from silver to white. New "third wing" spoiler fabricated from an extra RS Cosworth unit. Notes: Rare grey market vehicle; one of 25 Escort RS Cosworths imported by a company called Sun International, and only one of 12 units legally registered in the US. Special guest and Escort RS Cosworth designer Frank Stephenson assisted in the addition of the third wing, which was part of his original design. If watched carefully, Ant Anstead slides in a reference to his sending out the turbo for balancing after his benchtop rebuild. Car with third wing installed sent to Darko Technologies in Utah for wind tunnel testing; third wing provided 94 pounds of downforce at 100 mph compared to the stock downforce of 69 pounds. Sold back to original owner at asking price.
137	2	1982 Toyota Celica Supra	US$7,500 £5,800	US$6,500 £5,000	US$10,865 £8,400	US$12,000 £9,200	+US$1,135 +£800	12 October 2017	39
Work Completed: Cracked exhaust manifold repaired and new exhaust system fitted. Cylinder head skimmed and asbestos head gasket replaced with modern graphite unit. Interior upholstery and trim refurbished; new steering wheel leather wrap and new carpets installed. Original wheels refinished. Pop-up headlamps realigned. Notes: Single-owner car since 1984. Mike could not find any replacement velour for restoring the interior, so he opted to have it refurbished. Sold to a buyer from Jacksonville, Florida.
138	3	1973 Ford Mustang Mach 1	US$19,000 £14,615	US$18,000 £14,000	US$25,200 £19,500	US$26,000 £20,000	+US$800 +£500	19 October 2017	45
Work Completed: New anti-roll bar, strut rods, upper and lower control arms, lowering springs, polyurethane suspension bushings and brakes. New ceramic coated exhaust system, electronic distributor, HT leads, spark plugs, ram air kit and carburettor jets; power restored from 186 bhp to 224 bhp. Interior refurbished with black/red leather and alcantara trim. Front grille and headlamp trim replaced with 1972 model year parts. New 17" wheels and tyres. Exterior paint polished with red pinstripes added. Notes: Though the car is a 1973 model, the previous owner installed 1972 model year parts in its initial restoration. Restored car taken to Willow Springs Raceway. Sold to a British buyer to be shipped to the UK.
139	4	1973 Saab 96	US$3,500 £2,500	US$2,800 £2,000	US$10,630 £7,900	US$11,750 £8,700	+US$1,120 +£800	26 October 2017	55
Work Completed: Clutch replaced, door hinges re-adjusted, rusted panels cut and patched with new metal, new badges, trim and accessories installed, damaged windscreen replaced, body resprayed in original Brilliant Yellow, ignition uprated to electronic ignition, manifold gasket replaced to fix exhaust leak, new interior installed. Notes: Clutch replacement was done at the seller's driveway. The windscreen was custom cut from the windscreen of a 2014 Chevrolet Impala. Restored car taken to a Saab owners' convention. Sold on behalf of a buyer in New York who sent a representative to finalize the transaction.
140	7	1965 Dodge A100 Sportsman Van	US$2,500 £1,850	US$2,000 £1,500	US$16,375 £12,400	US$19,000 £16,000	+US$2,625 +£3,600	2 November 2017	96
Work Completed: Stock suspensions replaced with air ride suspension system, stock front bumper replaced with customised unit made from two rear 1968 Chevrolet Camaro bumpers, wheels and tyres replaced with low-profile tyres and larger-sized alloy wheels, stock 225 CID slant-6 engine swapped to a 318 V8 power plant, stock manual gearbox replaced with automatic transmission, roof rack installed, light bar installed, warm water shower installed using beer keg as a water tank and a heat exchanger to warm the water, rusted original doghouse bonnet treated, new custom interior made, consisting new seats and a custom table made from a surfboard, custom gear selector lever fitted to correspond with the gearbox swap, clear coat applied to keep the car's patina. Notes: Purchased in Oregon. Converted into a surf van. Mike and Ant initially wanted the slant-6 engine to be rebuilt but found it to be too costly. Restored car taken to Malibu. Sold to an unidentified international buyer.
141	6	1964 Ford Falcon Ranchero	US$6,000 £4,500	US$4,500 £3,500	US$18,100 £13,600	US$20,000 £15,000	+US$1,900 +£1,400	9 November 2017	95
Work Completed: New coilover springs, shock absorbers, upper and lower control arms. Front drum brakes replaced with GM disc brakes. New rear leaf springs with proper shackles. Brightwork restored from matte black to chrome. Full body respray from matte black to period-correct turquoise and cream. Engine rebuilt and repainted from yellow to black; new clutch and flywheel installed. Aftermarket radiator replaced with newer high flow aluminium unit. New wood bed liner. New interior door cards, carpeting, headliner and vinyl bench seat. Notes: Equipped with a 289 cu in (4.7 L) Windsor V8 and 4-speed manual transmission. Restored car taken to a ranch to pay tribute to its farming roots. Sold at asking price.
142	5	1994 Mitsubishi 3000GT VR-4	US$7,000 £5,000	US$6,500 £4,800	US$8,900 £6,700	US$12,000 £9,000	+US$3,100 +£2,300	16 November 2017	42
Work Completed: Lifter tick addressed by installing new lifters from later model 3000GT. Cylinder head gaskets and seals replaced. Passenger side hydraulic leak fixed with second-hand line to address the faulty active steering. Front seats refreshed by cleaning and dyeing to original creme colour. Faulty active exhaust fixed by lubricating the butterfly valve. Active aero wing switches replaced. Aftermarket boost gauge removed. Blow-off valve, gear lever and air filter replaced with stock Mitsubishi parts. Rubber gear lever bushings upgraded with brass ones. Aftermarket König wheels replaced with 1995 3000GT VR-4 factory chrome wheels. Notes: Previous owner added numerous aftermarket parts. Brought back to near-original condition. Sold at asking price.
143	8	1965 Austin-Healey 3000 Mark III BJ8 Convertible	US$40,000 £32,000	US$35,000 £28,000	US$44,535 £35,628	US$71,000 £56,800	+US$26,465 +£21,172	22 November 2017	45
Work Completed: Engine oil leak sorted by replacing the valve cover cork gasket. Radiator re-cored and repainted. Custom stainless steel exhaust manifold fabricated to replace the factory cast iron ones. Exhaust system replaced with custom fabricated stainless steel side exit units with two mufflers instead of four. Dual SU carburettors replaced with triple Weber carburettors. Non-working overdrive solenoid replaced. Black vinyl interior retrimmed in red leather and new carpets installed. Dashboard veneer refurbished. Aftermarket luggage rack removed. Car cleaned and detailed. Notes: Restored car sold at a Barrett-Jackson Las Vegas auction for US$71,000. Highest profit made on any car.
Part II
144	13	1969 Opel GT 1900	US$6,000 £4,200	US$6,000 £4,200	US$9,850 £7,000	US$13,500 £9,700	+US$3,650 +£2,700	11 April 2018	46
Work Completed: New fuel filter and water pump. Dents on left front wing and driver's side door repaired and repainted. Brake servo replaced with larger unit and missing vacuum line fitted. Pop-up headlamp mechanism replaced with new unit. Full body respray to original green colour with blacked out rear. Notes: Purchased in Charlotte, North Carolina, at asking price.
145	10	1988 Jeep Grand Wagoneer	US$6,000 £4,500	US$4,500 £3,000	US$19,350 £13,800	US$26,500 £19,000	+US$7,150 +£5,200	18 April 2018	65
Work Completed: New four-wheel-drive shift motor and vacuum bulbs. Full body respray from white to Dark Baltic Blue. Faux wood trim panels removed; new wood pattern hand painted on body panels. New leaf springs, shock absorbers, sway bars, and steering arm and stabiliser. New tyres and reconditioned wheels. New speedometer gear to compensate for larger tyres. Interior and seats reupholstered. Exterior trim refurbished.
146	16	2004 Mini Cooper S MC40	US$6,000 £4,500	US$5,300 £4,100	US$7,890 £5,700	US$9,000 £7,500	+US$1,110 +£925	25 April 2018	23
Work Completed: Full 100,000-mile service, including new oxygen sensors, water pump, thermostat, coolant cap, ignition coil, HT leads, fuel filter, hoses and serpentine belt. Supercharger reconditioned and cleaned. New left fog lamp. New MC40 reproduction decal set made to replace missing ones. New suspension dampers and springs to replace aftermarket suspension. New tyres fitted. Headliner reupholstered. Aftermarket projector headlamps and air intake system replaced with stock units. New rear badge. Notes: Purchased in Northern California. MC40 decals replicated by Sticky Fingers Design. Restored car taken to the Los Angeles River to pay homage to The Italian Job, then to a Mini meet in San Clemente, California.
147	11	1987 Alfa Romeo Spider Quadrifoglio	US$8,900 £	US$7,000 £5,500	US$8,400 £6,000	US$10,000 £7,150	+US$1,600 +£1,150	2 May 2018	45
Work Completed: Prop shaft repainted and reconditioned with new carrier bearing. Rear differential refurbished with new friction plates. New air conditioner compressor, belt and dryer. Engine valve cover sandblasted and powder coated in wrinkle red. Driver's side window runner straightened. Replacement convertible soft top fabric installed. Notes: Car comes with rare detachable hardtop. Previous owner supplied new soft top fabric. Engine valve cover painted by Primo Powder Coating and Sandblasting. Sold at asking price.
148	17	1970 International Scout 800A	US$8,500 £6,500	US$8,000 £6,000	US$15,800 £11,500	US$22,500 £16,000	+US$6,700 +£4,500	10 May 2018	64
Work Completed: Transfer case rebuilt and repainted. New power steering box assembly. Bullbar removed. Full body respray from yellow to Heritage Green. Vacuum-operated wipers replaced with electric system. Seats reupholstered with black vinyl and new polyurethane foam. Headlamps and trim pieces refurbished. New wheels and tyres. New badges installed. Notes: Purchased in Phoenix, Arizona. Previously used as a military vehicle. Sold at asking price.
149	12	1977 Porsche 924	US$5,000 £3,500	US$3,700 £2,500	US$8,380 £5,900	N/A	N/A	17 May 2018	46
Work Completed: Engine main seals replaced to address oil leak. Engine parts cleaned and painted. New cam belt, tensioner, sump gaskets and clutch. Engine serviced with multigrade oil. Warm-up regulator cleaned and modified to address rough idling. Transaxle linkage geometry and gear lever extended to improve gear change. Interior refurbished with new brown and tan colour combination dashboard and seats. Damaged front valance fixed. Exterior polished. Notes: US-spec car with 95 hp engine and four-speed transmission. Mike recalled his memories about restoring a Porsche 924 during the programme's very first episode. Restored car taken to Downtown L.A. for its test drive. Car was not sold at the end of the episode after the on-screen buyer backed out on the sale.
150	15	1972 Datsun 510	US$6,500 £5,000	US$5,000 £3,500	US$11,930 £8,800	US$20,000 £15,000	+US$8,070 +£6,200	24 May 2018	60
Work Completed: Part of left rear wing replaced using part from donor panel. Right front wing fixed with original indicator light hole restored and incorrect hole welded shut. Instrument cluster cleaned, tachometer repaired and installed. Full body respray to blue. Factory 4-speed manual gearbox replaced with 5-speed unit. Crossmember modified to accommodate new gearbox. New tail light wiring loom and LED bulbs. New period-correct wheels and tyres. New black interior. Notes: Rare 2-door variant. Previously modified by seller and crudely painted in Trans-Am Series replica red/white with red/blue stripes. Replacement left rear wing provided by seller. Restored car taken to Long Beach pay homage to Nissan's import history in America. Sold at Mike's asking price on an open offer.
151	14	1972 Lancia Fulvia 1.3S Series II	US$10,000 £9,200	US$9,500 £7,000	US$14,105 £9,800	US$33,000 £25,500	+US$18,895 +£15,700	31 May 2018	21
Work Completed: Driveshaft assembly repainted and rebuilt with new gearbox oil seal and CV joints to address oil leak. New heater control valve. Plastic dashboard bezel replaced with custom wooden unit. Fuel tank repainted. New fuel filter and fuel supply line. Bumpers removed. New period-correct Carello fog lamps installed with custom brackets fitted to stock bumper mounts. Stock indicators and new chrome vent rings retrofitted on front end. Parts of the front wings and scuttle resprayed to matte black to match the bonnet. New dash pad and steering wheel. Wheels refinished in satin gold. Notes: Purchased in Sonoma, California. Mike originally wanted to buy a 1971 Rover P6 3500, but backed off due to the car's derelict condition. The Lancia was directly imported from Italy, equipped with a 1.3L engine and four-wheel disc brakes. Converted to rally-spec unit. Sold to a broker.

=== Series 15 (2018–19) ===
No. overall	No. in series	Vehicle	Budget	Purchase price	Final cost after restoration	Final selling price	Profit/loss	Original release date	Labour (man-hours)
Part I
152	1	1976 Mercury Capri Mk2	US$5,000 £4,000	US$4,000	US$8,212 £6,150	US$8,212 £6,150	US$0	3 October 2018	48
Work Completed: Gaskets and main seals replaced to address oil leak. Color-coded aftermarket parts repainted black. Engine repainted in blue. Non-working sunroof repaired by having a part of the sunroof assembly 3D printed. Federal bumpers converted to Euro-spec. New ceiling headliner installed. Interior reupholstered from black/red to black/tan. Car repainted in black. Wheels repainted from silver to gold. New front grille and chin spoiler. Notes: Previous owner upgraded the timing gears with aftermarket aluminium units. Plastic clips required for sunroof function were 3D printed since Ford no longer produced such parts for the Capri. Ant converted the car's bumpers to Euro-spec by fabricating the bumpers from steel tubes and plates. Second car in the series to sell at break even point.
153	3	1991 Toyota MR2 Turbo	US$10,000	US$7,000	US$9,145 £7,000	US$11,000 £8,500	+US$1,855	10 October 2018	43
Work Completed: Water bypass hose No. 6 replaced. Cylinder head and turbocharger reconditioned. Gaskets, head bolts, water pump, timing belt and idler pulley, clutch, and engine mounts replaced. New coilover suspension, 17" alloy wheels and tyres installed. Weight distribution adjusted using load cells. Paint correction done to match repainted front bumper with the rest of the white body colour. Notes: Front bumper was repainted by one of the previous owners. Ant introduced the water bypass hose No. 6's common nickname "The Hose from Hell" due to its location. Restored car taken to a go-kart track for its test drive. Sold at asking price.
154	6	1995 Volvo 850 T-5R Wagon	US$10,000 £7,500	US$7,000 £5,000	US$8,677 £6,700	US$13,999	+US$5,322	17 October 2018	28
Work Completed: New turbo inlet housing, PCV system, intake manifold gasket, air filter, belts and tensioners, and taillights installed. Cracked bumpers repaired and repainted. Paintless dent removal applied on body panels. Window tint removed. Full body detailing. Notes: Mike introduced the process of plastic welding to fix the cracked bumpers. Restored car taken to Emergency Vehicle Operation Center in San Bernardino to pay homage to both Ant's background as a former police officer and the car's former popularity as a rapid response police car in the UK. Sold to a buyer from Wisconsin at US$1 below asking price.
155	5	1991 Alfa Romeo 164 L	US$4,000 £3,000	US$3,000	US$5,212 £4,000	US$7,000	+US$1,788	24 October 2018	36
Work Completed: New clutch kit; flywheel resurfaced. Steering rack rebuilt. New timing belt, tensioner, water pump, power steering belt, and starter motor installed. Exhaust manifold repaired and gaskets replaced. New brakes and CV joint boots. New radiator hoses, fuel pump and injector wiring. Notes: Mike and Ant mentioned that the car was the last Alfa Romeo model sold in the US before the company pulled out of the country in 1995. Ant referenced the car's history as a taxi in Rome. Sold at asking price in exchange of another 164.
156	8	1991 Lotus Elan M100	US$8,000 £6,000	US$8,000 £6,000	US$9,385 £7,100	US$14,000	+US$4,615	31 October 2018	26
Work Completed: New left front control arm. New custom exhaust system with original catalytic converter and new silencer fitted. New camshaft angle sensor, thermostat, and electric cooling fans. Full service performed. Convertible hood refurbished with new vinyl rear windscreen. Interior cleaned and detailed. Headlight actuator gears replaced. Factory wheels refurbished. Notes: Purchased at asking price with aftermarket wheels, with standard wheels provided by seller. Ant decided to fabricate the replacement exhaust after finding out that the original muffler was missing and that the Elan's standard exhaust had been deliberately dented at the factory. Restored car taken to Valley of Fire Road in Clark County, Nevada, for its test drive.
157	4	2002 Chevrolet Corvette C5 Z06	US$16,000 £12,000	US$16,000 £12,000	US$17,910.90 £13,800	US$18,000	+US$89.10	7 November 2018	38
Work Completed: New clutch plate, pilot bearing, and throwout bearing. Electronic brake control module refurbished with new relay. Harmonic balancer replaced with smaller unit. Driver's seat runners repaired by adding nylon washers on stoppers. Full detailing performed and ceramic coating applied. Notes: Purchased at asking price at an online marketplace. Mike and Ant made references to Corvette's notorious stereotype as a car for people in a midlife crisis. Restored car taken to Willow Springs Raceway. Sold at asking price.
158	2	1984 Volkswagen Rabbit GTI	US$3,500	US$2,500 £1,700	US$6,769 £5,200	US$9,500	+US$2,731	14 November 2018	48
Work Completed: Fuel distributor reconditioned. Throttle body replaced with a larger unit from a Golf Mk2; inlet port widened to match the throttle body port size. New gearbox oil seal and CV boots. Sunroof mechanism repaired. Front end replaced with Euro-spec grille, front valance, front air dam, and headlights. Federal bumpers replaced with Euro-spec units. Air conditioning system upgraded to R134A. New interior. Full body respray to original black colour. Notes: Second Golf GTI purchased in the series. Fitted with original parcel shelf, which is considered rare. Mike mistakenly referred the car as a 1984 model when it was actually a 1983 model. In order to make the grille fit with the Rabbit's original front end, Ant made filler plates using leftover steel plates and welded them to the front wings. Sold at asking price.
159	7	2004 Dodge Ram SRT-10	US$15,500 £12,000	US$15,500 £12,000	US$19,635 £15,000	US$22,000	+US$2,365	21 November 2018	28
Work Completed: New engine main seal. Clutch and flywheel uprated with twin-disc ceramic clutch and billet steel flywheel. Engine misfire addressed by cleaning up animal matter on the sixth cylinder and replacing the HT leads, spark plug wires, and coil packs with uprated units. New cold air intake, serpentine belt and tensioner. Brakes flushed and brake fluid replaced. Hydraulic cooling fans replaced with electric units, Badges removed for a stealth look. Wheels and brightwork repainted from chrome to black. Notes: Purchased at asking price. Seller was not present as they were at work. Ant discovered that a mouse may have entered the car and chewed one of its spark plug cables, causing it to misfire. Mike and Ant made references to Ram's low fuel economy. Restored car taken to Kern County Raceway Park to pay tribute to its NASCAR heritage. Sold at asking price.
Part II
160	10	2000 Porsche 911/996 Convertible	US$18,500	US$16,000	US$20,256	US$22,500	+US$2,244	18 April 2019	29
Work Completed: Intermediate shaft bearing (IMS) replaced, crankcase modified to accommodate IMS-related replacement parts, oil filter replaced, oil/air separator replaced, main seal replaced, flywheel and clutch replaced, wheel bearing replaced, center console trimmed in matching black leather, aftermarket air intake replaced with OEM unit. Notes: Ant quickly highlighted the 996's intermediate shaft bearing, which is a notorious weakness of the car. Ant managed to replace the bearing by using a repair kit consisting of a bushing kit, a direct oil feed system, and a braided hose. Sold to a buyer who lives in Washington, D.C.
161	11	1970 Volkswagen Fastback (Type 3)	US$7,000	US$7,000	US$7,977	US$11,000	+US$3,023	25 April 2019	17
Work Completed: Fuel-line fibre washer, gauze and sender unit in the fuel tank replaced to address petrol odor, valve cover and oil pan gaskets replaced with silicon units, interior redone by replacing the old seat frame and reupholstering the seats, ride height adjusted by replacing old rear spring plate with new, adjustable units and adjusting the standard front spring plates, gear lever replaced with shorter unit, steering wheel replaced, front indicator lenses replaced, hubcaps replaced, paint corrected, new headliner installed, trims replaced. Notes: Previous owner modified the engine by installing an upgraded engine with nearly 2.0 litres of displacement and twin carburetor setup, lowering the car, and installing a taller gear lever. Sold to a pair of classic Volkswagen enthusiasts.
162	12	1971 Chevrolet C-10 Truck	US$15,000	US$12,500	US$19,350	US$20,250	+US$900	1 May 2019	30
Work Completed: Four-barrel carburetor replaced with electronic fuel injection system, stock three-speed Turbo-Hydramatic automatic transmission swapped with a four-speed THM200-4R unit, brake booster added to aid braking, lowering kit installed, air conditioning installed, new steering wheel with tilt column installed. Notes: Long wheelbase variant. Previous owner who lives in Oregon already restored the car with various parts installed. Mike made a $500 credit by selling the old transmission. Restored car taken to Last Name Brewing to pay homage to its utilitarian roots. Sold to a couple from Texas.
163	13	1985 Mazda RX-7 GSL-SE	US$5,000	US$4,500	US$8,653	US$9,950	+US$1,297	8 May 2019	36
Work Completed: Broken throttle body replaced to address rough idling, aftermarket aluminium engine mounts replaced with stock rubber units, fan shroud installed to aid cooling, suspensions replaced, aftermarket wheels replaced with refurbished OEM wheels and tires, stock steering wheel installed, tow strap removed, stock muffler installed, aftermarket tachometer removed, aftermarket start button removed, aftermarket shift knob replaced with stock unit, exterior paint scuffed and resprayed to match the original paint on the door sills. Notes: Special edition GSL-SE model, previously fitted with various aftermarket parts. In order to aid cooling, Ant fabricated a custom fan shroud that fits the aftermarket radiator. Brought back to near-standard condition, save for a larger aftermarket radiator and the suspensions, which Ant swapped with ones from a reputable brand. Restored car taken to a movie set where Mike put the car to the test drive while wearing a head cam to give a POV driving experience. Sold at $50 below Mike's offer so the buyer can buy a set of louvers to match his first new car.
164	14	1985 Mercedes-Benz 300TD	US$5,000	US$4,500	US$5,809	US$11,100	+US$5,291	15 May 2019	17
Work Completed: Injection pump cleaned, fixed and recalibrated, vacuum pipes fixed and connectors replaced to address leaking vacuum line, valves adjusted and valve cover gasket replaced, broken aerial replaced, wood shifter panel replaced, driver side armrest cover replaced, cracked dash cap replaced, carpet dyed. Notes: Restored car taken to Lake Hemet. Mike compared the car's 0–60 times. Before restoration, the car clocked 20 seconds; however, after being restored, the car clocked 17.31 seconds under full load.
165	15	1974 Jensen-Healey	US$4,500	US$3,500	US$9,198	US$9,500	+US$302	22 May 2019	29
Work Completed: Front end was rebuilt; new polyurethane bushes, new ball joints, new engine mounts, subframe assembly cleaned and repainted. Cracks on exhaust manifold welded, muffler, resonator, and exhaust mid pipe replaced, new exhaust collector pipe made, gear linkage bushes replaced, carburetor diaphragm replaced and damper oil added, O-ring replaced, front bumper replaced with Euro-spec bumper, spotlights installed, full respray in original red color with black accents on the rear end, soft top replaced, rear bumper delete performed, new custom license plate with Union Jack background installed. Notes: Purchased in San Francisco. Mike returned to Britain to source various parts for the Jensen-Healey.
169	16–17	1965 Plymouth Barracuda	US$	US$5,000	US$	N/A	N/A	23 May 2019	N/A
Work Completed: Modifications and repairs around the bodywork done to accept new engine and powertrain, roll cage made, engine swap to a 5.7-litre Hemi from a 2014 Dodge Charger R/T, Edelbrock supercharger package, new custom wheels made to accommodate modern brakes as well as retaining the old hubcaps. Notes: Mike originally wanted to resto-mod the car, but changed his mind after letting the car sit for 12 months, turning it into a drag racer instead. Mike paid a visit to Antron Brown to learn about drag racing. Work Completed: Engine modified with new heads, new camshaft, new lifters, new pushrods, new headers, new radiator, supercharger kit, nitrous, racing air filter, and a large throttle body from Challenger Hellcat, standard 8-speed automatic transmission replaced with a drag-spec 2-speed Powerglide automatic, full body respray from tangerine to Petty blue, new brakes installed, rear axle replaced with Ford 9-inch rear axle with 4.56 final drive ratio, new leaf springs, racing seat and harnesses installed, triple-jointed steering column installed, racing fuel cell installed, nitrous oxide kit installed, throttle body adapter installed, drag tires installed. Notes: Converted into a Richard Petty tribute car, as he used to race with a Barracuda in the past. Fastest car and most ambitious project to date, according to Mike. Restored car taken to a drag strip for a race against Antron Brown in his Toyota Camry funny car. Sold to the NHRA museum in Pomona, California under the condition that Mike and Ant are able to take it to the track. The costs and labour are not given in the programme.
Part III
167	19	2004 BMW M3 (E46)	US$11,000	US$11,000	US$13,447	US$18,500	+US$5,053	17 September 2019	33
Work Completed: Converted SMG gearbox to manual transmission: SMG pump and fluid reservoir removed, assembly removed, bellhousing modified, clutch pedal assembly installed, manual gear position sensor installed, slave cylinder hose installed, manual gear lever installed, ECU reprogrammed, VANOS unit serviced with new O-rings, factory airbox and air filter installed. Notes: Originally equipped with SMG automated manual gearbox. Seller was absent during purchase. Previous owner installed an aftermarket exhaust. Sold to a buyer from Texas. Ant noted that the SMG and manual transmission-equipped M3 shared the same gearbox and clutch.
170	20	1965 Volvo Amazon 122S	US$4,000	US$3,500	US$4,281	US$6,500	+US$2,219	24 September 2019	28
Work Completed: Clutch master and slave cylinder replaced, new hydraulic lines made, front and rear suspensions rebuilt with various new parts, front brake discs resurfaced, front brake calipers rebuilt, rear drum brakes refurbished, new starter motor installed. Notes: Four-door model equipped with 1.8-litre engine and 4-speed manual transmission. Purchased in Washington. Mike initially cannot drive the car due to a non-working clutch and non-functioning brakes. Sold to a pair of siblings who are looking to purchase another Volvo Amazon.
171	21	1992 Ford Bronco XLT	US$10,000	US$10,000	US$10,925	US$14,000	+US$3,075	1 October 2019	28
Work Completed: New water pump installed, new gaskets installed, new O-rings for distributor installed, battery cables replaced, starter motor replaced, shifter electrical repaired, overdrive switch replaced, full body detailing performed. Notes: Sold through Barrett-Jackson auctions in West Palm Beach, Florida. Purchased at asking price.
166	22	1971 Fiat 124 Sport Spider	US$5,000	US$4,800	US$5,996.95	US$12,000	+US$6,003.05	8 October 2019	28
Work Completed: Prop shaft carrier bearing and universal joint replaced to address excessive play, rear differential refurbished with new seals, speedometer drive gear replaced, speedometer cleaned, seat covers replaced, dashboard repaired, gear shift gaiter replaced with new material, front bumper repaired, speedometer bezel remade and re-veneered. Notes: Rust-free survivor car finished in rare Amaranth colour. Ant accidentally broke the wooden speedometer bezel during dashboard disassembly. Sold to a buyer who is looking for a car to pay respect to his recently-deceased father.
172	23	1973 Toyota Celica ST	US$5,000	US$4,500	US$11,550	US$12,000	+US$450	15 October 2019	54
Work Completed: Engine swap from 18R-C to BEAMS 3S-GE performed, aftermarket sunroof deleted, dented rear quarter panel fixed, prop shaft replaced with one-piece unit, aftermarket aluminium radiator installed, full respray from green to matte black, roll cage installed, new steering wheel installed, new wheels and tires installed. Notes: Seller is unseen during purchase. Ant discovered that the cylinders are badly scored, prompting Mike to find a replacement rather than rebuilding it.
173	24	2002 Mercedes-Benz E 55 AMG (W210)	US$4,000	US$4,000	US$6,908	US$7,500	+US$592	22 October 2019	21
Work Completed: Full service performed: air box and air filter cleaned, spark plugs replaced, new O2 sensors installed, engine oil changed, oil filter replaced, new digital AC panel installed, rear differential rubber bushing replaced to address vibration during deceleration, brake discs replaced, rear shock absorbers replaced, driver's seat repaired, old wiper grommets replaced with new units made from a more modern material, new wiper blade installed, cabin filter replaced, HEPA filter replaced, headlight lenses detailed, wheels refinished, front bumper and roof repainted. Notes: Car was originally sold as parts exchange. Mike made some references about Mercedes-Benz E-Class' reputation as taxicabs around the world. Restored car taken to Willow Springs Raceway Horse Thief Mile racetrack. Sold to a buyer from San Francisco.
174	25	1985 Merkur XR4Ti	US$4,000	US$4,000	US$6,750	US$7,500	+US$750	29 October 2019	17
Work Completed: Aftermarket intercooler removed and standard intake pipe reinstated, factory AC system reinstated with refurbished compressor, new dryer, new AC pipes, and new condenser, screw for turbo oil feed fastened to address oil leak, custom exhaust installed using new catalytic converter, new silencer, and new, re-routed pipes, radiator fans replaced with bigger, double-fan unit, Euro-spec Ford Sierra XR4i headlights installed, bumpers and cladding restored, new grille installed, non-standard Ford Focus alloy wheels replaced with Ford Sierra telephone dial wheels, Merkur badge replaced with Ford blue oval badge. Notes: Previous owner removed the air conditioner to fit an aftermarket intercooler kit. Mike and Ant occasionally refer the car as Ford Sierra XR4i, its European counterpart. Purchase price includes replacement parts that are stored in the car's boot. Sold to a buyer from the UK who also covered the shipping costs.
168	26	1985 Toyota Land Cruiser FJ60	US$13,250	US$12,500	US$15,280	US$16,000	+US$720	5 November 2019	24
Work Completed: Original 4-speed manual gearbox swapped for a 5-speed unit from a later FJ62, new transmission gasket installed, steering knuckles rebuilt, driveshaft refurbished, brake wire connected to the new master cylinder, handbrake cable bracket serviced to address non-functioning handbrake, rear drum brake shoes replaced, paint correction performed. Notes: Mike made a $600 profit from selling the old 4-speed manual gearbox

=== Series 16 (2020–21) ===
No. overall	No. in series	Vehicle	Budget	Purchase price	Final cost after restoration	Final selling price	Profit/loss	Original release date	Labour (man-hours)
Part I
175	8	1969 Datsun Sports 2000	US$9,000	US$8,500	US$12,395	US$14,000	+US$1,605	31 August 2020	34
Work Completed: Front end overhaul performed: front suspension and steering idler box rebuilt, front brakes uprated with new pads, calipers, and ventilated, cross-drilled, and slotted discs, rear drum cylinder repaired, convertible top reinstated using refurbished secondhand unit, exhaust headers repaired by welding and replacing the flange with V-band clamps, exhaust mid-pipe replaced with new tubing, ceramic coating performed on the exhaust pipes, pedal spacing adjusted, cylinder head cover repainted, wheels refinished, seats re-covered from velour to vinyl. Notes: Purchased from Gene Winfield and previously equipped with a hard top and had its front bumper removed. Mike decided to upgrade the Datsun's front brakes using Volvo 240 parts that are modified to fit Datsun 2000. Soft top frame refurbished by painting the frame with satin paint and heating it using a heat gun to achieve desired results.
176	3	2001 Audi S4 Avant	US$8,000	US$7,000	US$7,685	US$12,250	+US$4,565	7 September 2020	23
Work Completed: Leaking valve cover addressed by replacing the gaskets, timing belt and serpentine belt replaced, spark plug replaced, engine oil seal replaced, camshaft seals replaced, damaged LCD screen on the instrument cluster repaired, cup holder and ashtray repaired, dent on rear panel repaired. Notes: Ant had to strip the front end to gain access to the belts and valve covers. Broken LCD screen repaired at a TV repair shop.
177	4	2001 Saab 9–3 Viggen	US$4,500	US$4,500	US$7,002	US$7,500	+US$498	14 September 2020	21
Work Completed: Valve cover gasket replaced, standard cylinder head bolts replaced with torque-to-yield head bolts, hydraulic rams for convertible roof repaired, front suspension top mounts replaced to address scuttle shake, track rod ends replaced, CV boots replaced, seats recolored, front bumper replaced, paint refreshed. Notes: Seller was absent as she has to go to work. Ant highlighted older, pre-2001 Saab 9–3 (as well as 9–5)'s head bolts, which were coated with wax and anti-friction material, making them prone to loosening due to age. Mike went to Oregon in order to get the hydraulic rams repaired.
178	7	2006 Porsche Cayenne Turbo S	US$9,500	US$9,500	US$10,521	US$15,000	+US$4,479	21 September 2020	23
Work Completed: Air suspension system rebuilt by replacing residual pressure valves, compressor O-ring and plastic ring, brakes overhauled by replacing the discs and pads and refurbishing the calipers, prop shaft center bearing replaced with aftermarket part, rubber O-ring for the coolant pipes replaced, thermostat and rubber gasket replaced. Notes: Ant highlighted the Porsche Cayenne's reputation both as a high-performance SUV and a money pit due to its notoriously expensive parts and service bills. Previously fitted with Magnaflow exhaust and an uprated metal coolant pipes. Restored car taken to Willow Springs Raceway Horse Thief Mile track, where Mike and Ant made remarks about the car having "split personality": both a family vehicle and performance vehicle. Sold back to previous owner.
179	1	2004 Mazdaspeed MX-5	US$7,300	US$6,500	US$8,869	US$9,500	+US$631	28 September 2020	22
Work Completed: Oil leak fixed by resealing the transmission with correct RTV sealant, lighter flywheel installed, new clutch installed, blow off valve modified with aluminium box to silence the turbo flutter, aftermarket induction kit re-routed and custom heat shield made, tail light lens surrounds removed, aftermarket wheels replaced with standard Mazdaspeed MX-5 wheels, boost controller installed, boost gauge relocated to driver's side AC vent, A-pillar trim replaced, full body detailing performed. Notes: Brought back to near-standard condition. Mike went to an autocross competition to source the rare Mazdaspeed MX-5 wheels.
180	5	1979 Jeep CJ-7 Levi Edition	US$7,800	US$7,000	US$15,698	US$20,000	+US$4,302	5 October 2020	27
Work Completed: Rusty A-pillar addressed by fabricating replacement panels from new metal, front fender replaced, new interior fitted, valve seals replaced, spark plugs replaced, valve cover gaskets replaced, viscous fan and clutch replaced, chassis cleaned, body mounts replaced, full respray performed, new decals installed. Notes: Previous owner purchased the car from an online auction, where Mike learned that she had been scammed as she paid a hefty sum of money for a car that needed a lot of work. Fitted with rare AMC V8 engine. Restored car taken to a lake in the desert, with Mike wearing sailor-inspired clothes. Sold at asking price.
181	6	1991 Nissan 300ZX Twin Turbo	US$13,500	US$12,800	US$13,179	US$15,000	+US$1,821	12 October 2020	30
Work Completed: Emissions equipment reinstated in order to comply with California emissions standard: PCV valves, catalytic converters, factory airbox and air filter, injectors, and EGR system, new rocker covers installed, ECU remapped to factory settings, standard exhaust reinstated, engine and engine bay cleaned, factory wheels and tyres reinstated, faulty speed sensor replaced to address faulty HICAS, adjustable coilover suspensions installed, new Magnaflow silencer installed. Notes: Mike headed to Oregon to purchase the car. Previous owner fitted the car with rare Nismo LMGT4 wheels. Ant basically had to disassemble the engine to reinstate the emissions equipment, which results in a power loss of about 50 horsepower. Mike paid a visit to Steve Millen of Stillen fame to source the exhaust system. Mike earned a $2,000 profit by selling the old Nismo wheels. Restored car taken to Willow Springs Raceway for a test drive, where Mike invited professional drifter Micah Diaz to drift the car. Sold to a buyer whose father owns a 280Z.
Part II
182	9	1974 Fiat X1/9	US$5,500	US$5,500	US$7,182	US$8,000	+US$818	4 January 2021	23
Work Completed: Windscreen removed to address rust patches around the bulkhead, cooling system uprated by installing new rubber hoses, new two-ply aluminium radiator, new temperature sensor, additional cooling fan, new jubilee clips, new water pump, and new thermostat, rear main seal replaced, flywheel resurfaced, new clutch installed, new timing cover installed, wheel alignment performed, enamel pinstripes removed. Notes: Fairly rust-free example, much to Mike and Ant's amazement, as X1/9s are notoriously prone to rust. Mike has been looking for a pristine X1/9 for 17 years. Bought by a friend at the behest of Mike. Ant repaired the smaller rust by bronze filler, as it's less harmful than lead.
183	11	1964 Triumph TR4	US$6,800	US$6,800	US$12,305	US$16,500	+US$4,195	11 January 2021	40
Work Completed: Engine block painted in satin black, carburetor seals replaced, rear main seal replaced with more modern unit, cooling system uprated with new water pump and thermostat housing, lightened flywheel installed, new clutch installed, door skin replaced, polarity reversed from positive to negative earth by swapping old generator with more modern alternator and adjusting the wiring loom accordingly, engine tune-up performed, new wire wheels installed. Notes: Rust-free, single-owner, barn find car in British racing green. Previous owner had it stored for 20 years. Mike returned to Britain to source replacement door skin. Sold to a buyer from San Diego.
184	14	1968 International Travelall	US$15,000	US$14,500	US$16,806	US$18,000	+US$1,194	18 January 2021	28
Work Completed: Points ignition system upgraded to electronic ignition; new thermostat housing installed to accommodate ignition system, new leads, oil leak addressed by swapping the gasket to original cork material, minor rust patched with fresh metal, paintwork touched up with color-matched spray paint, interior sound deadening replaced with more modern material and fully re-upholstered. Notes: Mike notes the car being a forerunner of modern SUVs and commenting about its sheer size, while Ant notes its agricultural heritage. Ant discovered the car was originally yellow when stripping the interior. Sold to an unknown buyer.
185	10	1999 BMW Z3 M Coupé	US$17,900	US$17,900	US$19,237	US$22,500	+US$3,263	25 January 2021	21
Work Completed: Rear subframe strengthened by installing thicker differential mounts and brackets, missing rear anti-roll bar installed, wheels refurbished and repainted from silver to dark gray, front mechanical fan deleted and electric fan uprated with new lower temperature fan switch, new water pump, new steel pulley, and new belt, wobbly passenger seat fixed by installing nylon shims on the linear motion lead screw. Notes: Popularly known as the Clown Shoe. Ant notes a common weakness within the car's E36 platform, which is its rear subframe. Previous owner modified the car's undercarriages by installing bolt-on kits.
186	2	1979 Triumph TR7	US$2,600	US$2,000	US$3,103	US$6,000	+US$2,897	1 February 2021	15
Work Completed: Factory Zenith twin carburetors rebuilt and reinstated, wiring loom replaced, rear shock absorbers replaced. Notes: Bought from the outskirts of Los Angeles. Previous owner left the keys as he's away. Purchase price includes some spare parts in the boot. Mike discovered that someone swapped the original twin carburetor with a single carburetor from a Volkswagen Beetle and a custom manifold, which negatively affects performance. Work completed on suspension, tyres, paint refinishing and addressing issues with electrics (partial re-wiring completed). Mike returns to Britain once again to source the replacement wiring loom. Sold to an unknown buyer.
187	13	1965 Dodge Coronet 500	US$17,500	US$16,500	US$19,490	US$19,500	+US$10	8 February 2021	27
Work Completed: Stock steering box replaced with power-assisted kit, stock brakes uprated with electric brake booster kit, transmission rebuilt for road use, bonnet replaced, steering wheel, dashboard panel, and gear selector replaced with factory units. Notes: Formerly used as a drag racer, but converted to pro street spec at some point. Previously fitted with big-block 440-cubic-inch engine and a set of American Racing alloy wheels. Smallest profit made to date.
188	12	1976 Land Rover Series III	US$15,000	US$13,500	US$17,259	US$23,000	+US$5,741	15 February 2021	16
Work Completed: Transfer case oil seal replaced, new handbrake drum kit installed, engine oil leak fixed by replacing the oil filter, O-ring, and drain plug, engine service performed: engine and transfer case oil changed, air filter assembly cleaned and filled with fresh oil, new glow plugs installed, injection pump adjusted, custom roof rack installed, winch and PTO kit installed. Notes: Rare diesel-engined variant, thought by Mike to be the only one registered in California. Mike and Ant notes the car's mass appeal, referencing the Queen who owns a number of Land Rovers. Converted to adventure off-roader. Sold to a buyer who previously bought the Jeep Grand Wagoneer from a previous episode. This episode marks the final appearance of Ant Anstead as he announced that he had left the show in November 2020.

=== Series 17 (2021–22) ===
Series 17 marks the debut of Marc Priestley as the programme's mechanic. The time spent on labour is no longer given.

No. overall	No. in series	Vehicle	Budget	Purchase price	Final cost after restoration	Final selling price	Profit/loss	Original release date	Labour (man-hours)
Part I
189	1	1965 Austin Mini 850 (Mark 1)	£10,000	£10,000	£11,896	£14,000	+£2,104	30 August 2021	n/a
Work Completed: Fitted new spark plugs as part of the process to start the engine after having sat idle for over a decade, replaced the missing primary and secondary clutch cylinders with period correct metal units, refurbished the external chrome brightwork using a spray chrome process, upgraded the front drum brakes to disc brakes which includes new CV joints, skimmed the cylinder head for higher compression, hardened valve seats installed and ported the head, added a new carburettor, camshaft, exhaust manifold and oil temperature gauge and repainted the engine bay and wheels. Notes: Bought from a private seller in Chepstow, whose family had owned the car since new. The car had not been driven on the road since 2006, so Mike began with a primer on how to safely start the engine. Mike mentioned there were only 81 Mini 850 MK1s registered in the UK. The car achieved an indicated 90 mph after the engine improvements. Sold at asking price.
190	2	1992 TVR Griffith 430	£18,995	£15,000	£16,749	£22,000	+£5,251	6 September 2021	n/a
Work Completed: New high-performance camshaft installed, delaminated windscreen replaced, burl walnut dashboard reinstated, number plate backlight replaced, engine heat shield installed. Notes: Mike noted that the previous owner swapped the original burr walnut dashboard with an aluminium one. Marc discovered that it had the rarer and more desirable 4.3-litre engine, while Mike's conference call with a former TVR works driver revealed that the car was a former demo car and originally had a 4.0-litre engine but rebuilt in-house with a 4.3 litre after the old engine knocked. Camshaft replacement adds 20 horsepower to the engine. Sold at asking price.
191	3	1997 Fiat Coupé 20V Turbo	£3,000	£2,750	£3,710	£6,000	+£2,290	13 September 2021	n/a
Work Completed: Broken boost pipe replaced to address air leakage, new timing belt and uprated water pump installed, turbocharger rebuilt with larger compressor and sports intake manifold, ECU remapped, water injection for intercooler installed, sticky dashboard cleaned and polished, windows tinted, and wheels repainted from silver to gunmetal gray. Notes: Mike noted its performance and rarity in the UK, where there are only around 500 Fiat Coupés left. Dyno test showed that the car had 184.5 hp at the time of purchase; when new, it had 220 hp. Marc pulled a favor and obtained a discount for the ECU remapping cost by making a custom map that can be sold on behalf of an ECU tuning shop that his friend owns. Modifications bump the horsepower to 317 hp with the water injection activated. Restored car taken to an airfield for a drag race against a 1992 Ferrari 348. Sold to a buyer whose father used to own a similar Fiat Coupé in the past.
192	4	1963 Bedford CA Dormobile	£4,500	£4,500	£10,182	£11,500	+£1,318	20 September 2021	n/a
Work Completed: Stock 1.5-litre engine and 3-speed manual transmission swapped to an automatic transmission-equipped Ford Pinto engine, custom-made engine mounts installed, new cabinets made, new prop shaft and rear axle installed, handbrake linkage re-made using a Ford Cortina handbrake cable, column shifter adapted to accommodate automatic transmission swap, new canopy installed, full body respray from dark green and cream to light blue and white, seats reupholstered with light blue and white vinyl. Notes: Mike named the car "Colin". Originally, it had a 4-speed transmission, but at some point it was swapped to a 3-speed unit by the previous owner. Replacement canopy sourced from Dormobile. Sold at asking price to a buyer who is expecting his granddaughter.
193	5	1963 Land Rover Series I	£16,000	£16,000	£25,310	£35,000	+£9,690	27 September 2021	n/a
Work Completed: Series II rear axle swapped with rebuilt Series I rear axle, steering box adjusted to lessen the amount of play, original Series I wheels installed, original bulkhead installed, new bonnet installed, new period-correct seats and soft top hood installed, new period-correct badge installed, original sidelights, taillights, front and rear indicators and semaphore indicators installed, full respray from dark green to original gray performed. Notes: Purchased in County Durham. Registered as a 1963 model, despite the Series I ending production in 1958. Elvis stripped the car to bare chassis and discovered that it was a Series I, specifically one from between 1953 and 1956 due to its 86-inch wheelbase; however, the car came equipped with a Series II rear axle. Brought back to near-authentic Series I guise, except for its improved steering box from a later model. Elvis heads to Shropshire to source an original rear axle, while Mike headed to Jaguar Land Rover Classic Works in Coventry to source the Series I bulkhead, wheels, and perform further inspections on the car. Mike obtained the Land Rover's heritage certificate and discovered that it was first registered in 1954 in Porton Down and used for 10 years before being decommissioned and re-registered for civil use and was originally grey. Restored car taken to Rocket Propulsion Establishment to pay homage to its military heritage. Sold to a buyer from Jersey.
194	6	2007 Porsche 997 Carrera 2	£15,000	£15,000	£20,805	£26,000	+£5,195	4 October 2021	n/a
Work Completed: Engine cylinders rebuilt with new, nickel ceramic-plated aluminium wet-type cylinder liners and pistons to address bore scoring, new IMS bearing fitted, crankshaft bearings replaced, new crankshaft installed, worn hoses and pipes replaced, retro styling parts consisting of replica Fuchs alloy wheels, fiberglass boot lid with ducktail spoiler, and decal kit installed. Notes: Purchased in Lichfield. Bought from a dealer whose owner decided to sell the car after it developed unknown noises from the engine. Equipped with the Tiptronic S automatic transmission. Marc noted that the pre-2008 911s are prone to a number of issues, such as bore scoring and the notorious intermediate shaft (IMS) bearings. Marc heads to Bolton to repair the car's engine, while Mike makes his way to Neil Bainbridge in Buckinghamshire to source aftermarket parts for the car. Restored car taken to Porsche Owners' Club GB track day event at Silverstone Circuit and sold at asking price on the spot.
195	7	1976 Jaguar XJ6 Series 2 4.2	£5,000	£5,000	£7,314	£8,000	+£686	11 October 2021	n/a
Work Completed: Engine serviced with new spark plugs, HT leads, fresh oil and petrol, fuel tanks and pumps replaced, brake system rebuilt with refurbished calipers, new discs, and new brake pads. New stainless steel exhaust installed, tyres replaced, new front and rear light bulbs installed, interior cleaned, brightwork polished. Battery recharged. Notes: Previously a non-running unit that sat in the previous owner's garage for 30 years. Mike noted the original dealer number plates, which indicates that the car is accident-free, as well as the car having twin fuel tanks. Sold right after Marc finished the restoration, with Mike making an arrangement with the new owner to use the car as a wedding car.
196	8	1987 Renault 5 GT Turbo	£6,000	£6,000	£7,796	£11,000	+£3,204	18 October 2021	n/a
Work Completed: Carburetor refurbished with new diaphragm and gaskets to address stalling, valves are re-adjusted, new hoses and rocker cover installed, exhaust manifold ceramic coated to address hot start issue, aftermarket intercooler replaced with standard one, refurbished Phase 2 wheels installed, period correct Avon tires installed, seats recovered with Phase 2 fabric pattern, front bumper fixed using a part from a donor bumper, new fog lights installed. Notes: Bought from Topcats Racing, which Mike visited during the TVR Griffith episode, where the car belonged to the shop owner's wife and was originally a birthday present. Marc reminisces his younger days, where he initially dreamed of a Renault 5 GT Turbo, but settled for a naturally-aspirated GTE model because he couldn't afford to insure the GT Turbo. Brought back to near-standard condition. Restored car taken to Donington Park to be presented back to the seller at her birthday.
197	9	2001 Mitsubishi Lancer Evolution VII	£6,750	£6,750	£12,497	£15,000	+£2,503	25 October 2021	n/a
Work Completed: Damaged engine replaced, crankshaft polished to address score marks, active yaw control pump replaced and relocated; new hydraulic lines and mounting kit installed to accommodate relocated pump. Fully adjustable suspension installed, vinyl wrap applied, original Lancer Evolution VII headlights and badges installed. Notes: Non-running unit that Mike bought online, with various engine bits stowed at the boot. Mike had to source a replacement block after Marc discovered that a snapped conrod punched a hole on the block. Marc points out a common modification among Lancer Evolution owners, which is relocating the active yaw control pump to the car's boot for added durability. Restored car brought to a modified car meet in Birmingham and sold at asking price.
198	10	2003 Volkswagen Golf Mk3.5 Cabriolet Colour Concept	£1,500	£1,350	£2,676	£3,100	+£424	1 November 2021	n/a
Work Completed: Rusted rear wheel arch patched with parts from a replacement wheel arch, stock suspensions replaced with adjustable aftermarket coilovers, wheels refurbished by repainting the wheel and diamond-cutting the rim, electric convertible roof re-wired, cracked windscreen replaced, leather seats recolored, exterior polished. Notes: Limited edition "Color Concept" variant with yellow paint and trim. Bought on behalf of Marc as it reminds him of his very first car, a bright yellow Volkswagen Beetle. Seller provided a brand-new replacement windscreen as part of the deal. Marc noted the car's rarity, as there are only 4 bright yellow Golf of similar type is still on the road. Mike introduced the process of connollising, a leather restoration method named after the Connolly Leather. In order to enable the convertible top to work, Marc re-wired the mechanism so the roof can only be lowered if the driver steps on the brake pedal.
Part II
199	1	1989 Ford Escort XR3i convertible	£3,500	£3,500	£5,257	£7,500	+£2,243	12 September 2022	n/a
Work Completed: Valve stem oil seals replaced, new cam belt installed, clutch replaced, gaskets replaced, engine and engine bay cleaned, door cards repaired, corroded front wing repaired with fresh metal, new headlamps installed, new indicators installed, new soft top installed, new vinyl stripping installed, new rev counter installed, paintwork refreshed. Notes: Bought from Mike's regular electrician who had owned it for years. Mike heads to Hertfordshire to repair the delaminated vinyl upholstery on the door cards and to Birmingham to source additional replacement parts for the Escort.
200	2	2003 Mercedes-Benz SL55 AMG	£10,000	£9,500	£12,626	£14,500	+£1,874	19 September 2022	n/a
Work Completed: Suspension valve blocks repaired, suspension strut ball joints repaired, broken suspension strut replaced, engine upgraded to over 500 bhp with smaller supercharger pulley, additional heat exchanger, upgraded supercharger pump, new pulleys, new belts, new tensioners, and new hoses, engine remapped to accommodate upgraded engine, wheels and tires replaced. Notes: Mike noted the upcoming prohibition of sale of new cars with petrol and diesel engine, set to be effective in the UK by 2030. Marc noted the car's notoriously complex F1-inspired active suspension system, which sometimes cause owners to replace the system with a simpler coilover setup. Mike heads to Liverpool to address the car's failing suspension strut ball joint. Upgrades add around 60 bhp from the car's stock horsepower. Sold at asking price.
201	3	1984 Vauxhall Astra GTE	£7,000	£7,000	£11,580	£20,500	+£8,920	26 September 2022	n/a
Work Completed: Engine fully rebuilt with oversized pistons, re-bored block, and smoothed crankshaft, non-original rear axle replaced with original part, clutch replaced, full service performed with fresh fluids, headlining replaced with period-correct material, front and rear windscreens reinstated, seats deep cleaned and reinstated, full body detailing performed, body and interior parts reinstalled, vinyl stickers installed, wheels repainted to original silver and new tires installed. Notes: First Vauxhall featured in the series. Mike noted its rarity, where only eight of which is registered in the UK, as well as its reputation for rust. Previous owner had owned the car since 1990; Mike bought it as an unfinished restoration project with various original parts supplied by seller. Marc noted that the car had non-original rear axle due to the presence of an anti-roll bar and rear disk brakes; Mike figured that it was a swap from a Vauxhall Cavalier, a common modification back in the past. Mike heads to south Wales to source various bits for the car, where Marc makes his way to Northampton to have the car's engine rebuilt. Brought back to original condition. Restored car brought to a Vauxhall Astra GTE owners gathering. Sold to a buyer who bought the car on behalf of his friend.
202	4	2006 BMW 335i	£5,000	£4,500	£9,930	N/A	N/A	3 October 2022	n/a
Work Completed: Rear differential upgraded with limited-slip unit, intercooler replaced with larger unit, exhaust remade with larger stainless steel pipes, new silencer, and quad exhaust tips, free-flowing air filter installed, full respray performed from gray to Estoril Blue using spray wrap method, BMW M3 wheels and tyres installed, bumpers replaced with more aggressive ones. Notes: Modified to look like a BMW M3, in anticipation of the upcoming BMW M3 estate. Marc heads to Hertfordshire to have the car's exhaust remade at a workshop that his friend owns. Restored car taken to Turweston Airfield for a drag race against an E92 BMW M3.
203	5	1963 Fiat 600	£5,750	£5,000	£8,491	£10,000	+£1,509	10 October 2022	n/a
Work Completed: Mechanical cooling flap fixed using new thermostatic valve, radiator flushed and repainted, engine cleaned, repainted, and fully rebuilt with new regulator, new dynamo, new water pump, new belts, new plugs, new leads, full body stripped to bare metal and repainted from white to Verde Chiaro, left hand door sill replaced with fresh metal, interior reupholstered from red to period-correct green and cream, brightwork polished, new gear knob and steering wheel installed, new roof rack installed. Notes: Left-hand drive unit bought in Kettering, Northamptonshire from an importer. Mike uses soda blasting to strip the car, as it is better for the Fiat's delicate metal. Mike also heads to Essex to have the seats and interior reupholstered. After being restored, Mike named the car Luigi.
204	6	2002 Jaguar S-Type R	£3,500	£2,950	£3,654	£4,350	+£696	17 October 2022	n/a
Work Completed: Supercharger fully serviced with new Teflon coating, new bearings, new coupler, and fresh oil, engine fully serviced with new iridium spark plugs, new air filter, new fuel filter, and new pollen filter, engine flushed and engine oil changed, engine oil filter changed, new badges installed Notes: High-mileage unit with 195,000 miles on the clock and came modified with smaller supercharger pulley and performance cat-back exhausts. Used engine oil analysed to see overall engine condition where Mike learned that the oil contains more water than acceptable tolerances; further testing by Marc pointed that the water level is caused by condensation from seaside air. Restored car taken to Bicester Heritage for a session with the chairman of Jaguar Drivers Club.
205	7	1974 Ford Transit Mk1	£11,500	£11,500	£13,115	£15,000	+£1,885	24 October 2022	n/a
Work Completed: Right-hand drive conversion performed, full respray from red to original gray performed, leaf springs refurbished, rear differential gear replaced with lower ratio gear. Notes: Left-hand drive unit previously owned by the German fire brigade with only 17,000 kilometers on the clock. Mike had his friend delivered the car to his house for inspection, as the car came from Huddersfield.The van is now owned by Mike.
206	8	1991 Mitsubishi Shogun	£4,500	£3,800	£5,383	£5,995	+£612	31 October 2022	n/a
Work Completed: Full service performed with new engine, gear, and transfer box oil, bent heat shield repositioned to address non-engaging transfer box, undercarriage treated with rust inhibitor and underseal coating, body lift kit installed, new bumper made to accommodate raised ride height, snorkel installed, winch installed, light bar installed, new wheels and tires installed. Notes: Equipped with automatic transmission. Marc discovered that a heat shield on the car's undercarriage is bent, which prevented the transfer box from engaging. Modified for green laning. Mike made a £300 profit by selling the old wheels and tires. Sold at asking price.
207	9	1969 Lotus Europa	£18,000	£16,500	£19,558	£22,500	+£2,942	7 November 2022	n/a
Work Completed: Cracked engine boot lid repaired and remade to period-correct specification, running gear fixed with new bearings, bushings, brake shoes, universal joints, drive flanges, and suspension kits, engine fully cleaned and serviced, chassis fully repainted from red stove enamel to Nardo Gray, yellow stripe wrapping applied, new wheels and tires installed, new quick release steering wheel installed, weight distribution balanced with corner scales. Notes: Bought in Avonmouth, Bristol. Equipped with uprated Spyder chassis; however, the seller told Mike that the car had peculiar handling at above 40 mph. Modified to pay homage to Lotus Type 47, Europa's racing counterpart. Restored car taken to Shelsley Walsh hill climb course.
208	10	1967 MGB Roadster	£12,000	£11,000	£13,296	£15,000	+£1,704	14 November 2022	n/a
Work Completed: Gearbox swapped from non-overdrive 4-speed unit to a 5-speed unit, suspension bushes uprated to polyurethane, new springs installed, original metal dashboard reinstated, original door caps reinstated, prop shaft remade to accommodate new gearbox, speedometer adjusted to accommodate the gearbox's electronic speedometer drive, leather-wrapped steering wheel installed. Notes: Bought from the same seller who sold Mike the MGB GT back in Series 2. Engine was rebuilt from the factory at some point. 5-speed transmission swap came from a Caterham Seven that was originally an adapted Mazda MX-5 unit. Restored car taken to Silverstone Circuit for a lap with the MGB Owners Club.

=== Series 18 (2023) ===
No. overall	No. in series	Vehicle	Budget	Purchase price	Final cost after restoration	Final selling price	Profit/loss	Original release date	Labour (man-hours)
Part I
209	1	1979 Triumph Dolomite Sprint	£8,000	£6,250	£9,812	£13,750	+£3,938	20 March 2023	TBC
Work Completed: Electric overdrive solenoid replaced, overdrive gear filter components serviced with new rear seal, carburetors serviced and rebuilt to accommodate E10 fuel, full repaint to original Pageant Blue performed, brightwork re-chromed, interior re-upholstered with black upholstery, vinyl roof reinstated. Notes: Bought from a Triumph Dolomite Sprint specialist. Mike noted the car's upcoming 50th anniversary, as well as its 16-valve engine that predates the Volkswagen Golf GTI. Mike returned to the car's seller to source the new interior. Restored car taken to Llandow Circuit to be tested against a Ford Escort Mexico, Dolomite Sprint's rival. Sold to a buyer from Leeds who used to own one when he was 17.
210	2	1981 Porsche 911 3.0 SC	£27,000	£27,000	£32,290	£36,000	+£3,710	27 March 2023	TBC
Work Completed: Rusted front wings repaired with fresh metal panels and repainted in original color, engine fully serviced and top-end rebuild performed, brakes uprated with new discs, six-piston calipers, and brake pads, heated windscreen installed, interior deep-cleaned, faulty high beam mechanism fixed. Notes: Bought as an unfinished project car with around 140,000 miles on the clock and equipped with rare "Pasha" checkered interior. Mike headed to Tyneside Safety Glass to have the heated windscreen made. Marc discovered that some of the cylinder head studs have fractured, so he sent the block to a specialist to have it repaired; the cylinder head studs are replaced with plastic-coated steel for improved reliability. Restored car taken to Scotland.
211	3	1976 Austin Allegro Vanden Plas 1500	£1,500	£1,500	£2,811	£3,000	+£189	3 April 2023	TBC
Work Completed: Engine fully serviced with new spark plugs, fresh fluids, and fresh petrol, new fuel filter installed, damaged electronic ignition magnet replaced, ball joint shims adjusted to address play, Hydragas suspension fluid topped up, dashboard re-veneered using water transfer print method, partial repaint performed, new battery installed, new tires installed. Notes: Bought as an unfinished project car from a couple whose husband suffers from dementia, previously sat for 7 years. Marc noted that the previous owner upgraded the car with electronic ignition system. Marc introduced the process of paint matching to partially repaint the car. Restored car taken to Bourton-on-the-Water to attend a meeting of "unloved cars". Sold at the car meet at asking price to a buyer whose father used to own one.
212	4	2005 Maserati 4200 GT	£9,995	£9,500	£11,373	£12,000	+£627	10 April 2023	TBC
Work Completed: Gear selector rebuilt to address leaking actuator, sticky dashboard pieces refurbished with new paint and coating, rear track control arm bushes replaced, F1 transmission pump replaced with identical Selespeed pump, full engine service performed. Notes: Bought from a car dealer. Mike heads to Peterlee to fix the sticky dashboard pieces. Marc learned that Maserati's F1 transmission pump can be substituted with Alfa Romeo's Selespeed pump. Restored car taken to a supercar meet at Castle Combe Circuit.
213	5	1980 Rolls-Royce Silver Spirit	£6,500	£4,000	£4,661	£5,900	+£1,239	17 April 2023	TBC
Work Completed: Exhaust manifold gaskets replaced, steering rack rebuilt, partial repaint performed using polyurethane aerosol paint, replacement interior cleaned and reinstated, broken Spirit of Ecstasy badge fixed, air freshener installed. Notes: Bought from a man who wants to get rid of the car quickly. Seller provided various period-correct interior parts as part of the purchase, which Mike cleaned and serviced using products purchased from a farrier. Mike challenged Marc to restore the car on a £1,000 budget. Marc made his own paint booth using plastic sheets to repaint the car. Restored car taken to Belvoir Castle. Sold back to original seller.
214	6	1979 Toyota Land Cruiser BJ40	£16,000	£20,400	£22,790	£26,000	+£3,210	24 April 2023	TBC
Work Completed: Broken power take-off (PTO) repaired with re-made cable, bearings, and bushes, winch line replaced with synthetic line, corroded gutter rail re-made, front-drive vacuum hoses replaced, bodywork touched up and polished, wheels repainted, new tyres installed. Notes: Bought sight unseen from an online auction in Japan and equipped with factory-fitted winch. Marc re-made the gutter rails to replace the corroded gutters as well as the worn-down PTO bushes using harder-wearing phosphorus bronze. Restored car taken to Scotland for an off-road drive. Sold to a buyer who sent a representative to deal on his behalf.
215	7	1991 Volvo 240 Estate Torslanda	£3,000	£2,300	£2,884	£4,000	+£1,116	1 May 2023	TBC
Work Completed: Rusted rear wheel arches repaired with replacement and re-made panels, injector refurbished, clutch replaced, gearbox cleaned, cracked dashboard repaired, decals replaced, detailing performed. Notes: UK-exclusive "Torslanda" edition, named after Volvo's production plant. Mike noted the previous owner used to do road trips across Europe with the car. Marc introduced the process of repairing cracked dashboard with super glue, spray activator, flexible filler, and plastic coating. Restored car taken to Gilks' Garage Cafe, where Mike and Marc helped carrying a sofa to demonstrate the car's cargo capacity. Sold at asking price.
216	8	2007 Ford Focus ST	£2,795	£2,795	£4,435	£6,000	+£1,565	8 May 2023	TBC
Work Completed: Engine rebored to address bore score, new oversized aluminium pistons installed, cylinder head skimmed, valve stem oil seals replaced, cam followers replaced, oxygen sensor replaced, ripped driver seat repaired with new foam and cover, vinyl stripes applied, wheels refurbished. Notes: Bought with an engine management issue, which Mike figured to be a heated oxygen sensor; Elvis noted the car's head gasket problem. Mike paid a visit to Ford Heritage Centre in Daventry to take a look at notable high-performance vehicles made by Ford. Sold at a Ford car meet. The team also paid a visit to Dave the trimmer for the interior.
217	9	1989 Audi Coupe 2.2E	£4,700	£3,500	£5,600	£6,000	+£400	15 May 2023	TBC
Work Completed: Brake servo replaced, mechanical fuel injection system replaced with closed-loop electronic fuel injection system, wheels converted into split rim design with new tires, engine oil changed with more modern spec, rear parking sensors installed, reverse camera with integrated rear view mirror installed, tape deck replaced with CD player. Notes: Single-owner example with a low mileage; however, it failed MOT testing due to broken brake servo. Marc quickly discovered that the brake servo is leaking. Mike had to source the replacement brake servo from Lithuania, since the part is not available anywhere in the UK. Electronic fuel injection conversion restored the car's power to 130 bhp. Restored car taken to St Austell, where Mike and Marc put the car to an economy run by driving it to Padstow, a distance of 20 miles, where Mike targeted the car to run the distance for less than £5. Sold at asking price.
218	10	1992 Volkswagen Corrado G60	£8,000	£6,750	£8,170	£9,700	+£1,530	22 May 2023	TBC
Work Completed: Supercharger serviced with new apex seals and oil bearings, damaged seats replaced, aftermarket steering wheel replaced with stock G60 three-spoke wheel, damaged parcel shelf replaced, aftermarket wheels replaced with secondhand stock BBS wheels, non-active spoiler fixed, aftermarket suspensions replaced with refurbished stock items, gear knob replaced, fog lights installed. Notes: Previous owner modified the car with various aftermarket parts, including powertrain modifications that bumped the car's horsepower from 160 bhp to 240 bhp. Equipped with rare Karmann interior. Marc noticed that the car had its supercharger replaced at some point, as it's younger than the car itself. Mike made an £900 profit from selling some of the car's parts. Brought back to near-standard condition. Restored car taken to Tan Hill Inn, Britain's highest pub. Sold to a buyer whose wife used to own a G60 Corrado. Mike initially offered a discount to £9,500 due to the buyer's wife's status as an NHS retiree, but the buyer raised Mike's offer.
Part II
219	1	1979 Ford Fiesta 1300S Mk1	£4,000	£4,000	£11,201	N/A	N/A	16 October 2023	TBC
Whole car stripped down and sandblasted, damaged panels replaced, non-original sunroof removed and replaced with new roof skin, full body respray performed, seats deep cleaned, engine top end modified to run on unleaded petrol, new water pump installed, new oil pump installed, new oil filter installed, new headlining installed, new suspension, wheels, and tires installed, original 1300 S sticker installed. Notes: This episode marks the 20th anniversary of Wheeler Dealers and to bid farewell to the Ford Fiesta following its discontinuation. Marc claims that it is one of the rustiest cars that he's ever seen. New roof skin sourced from a Mk2 Ford Fiesta, which is identical to the Mk1. Car was stolen a day prior to being unveiled, and has not been recovered by the time the episode aired.
220	2	1992 Peugeot 205 Rallye	£2,500	£2,850	£7,938	£12,500	+£4,562	23 October 2023	TBC
Work Completed: Crankshaft and flywheel rebalanced, custom forged pistons installed, performance camshaft installed, cylinder head ported and polished, engine refreshed, fuel system converted from single carburetor to fuel injection with individual throttle bodies, new inlet manifold made, new exhaust system installed, full respray performed, new bumpers installed, Euro-spec wheel arches installed, new decals installed, new tires and suspensions installed, interior retrimmed with new seat covers and carpets. Notes: UK-spec Rallye model with yellow paint, one of 250 units, bought sight unseen online. Mike and Marc aimed to outperform the Euro-spec cars, which had 103 bhp from the factory. Marc sourced the individual throttle bodies from a Suzuki GSX-R600 motorcycle. Restored car taken to Pembrey Circuit to be raced against a genuine Euro-spec 205 Rallye. After the race, Marc told Mike that the restored car made 135 hp. Sold to a buyer from New Zealand.
221	3	1989 Saab 900 Turbo Convertible	£7,500	£6,500	£7,489	£8,400	+£911	30 October 2023	TBC
Work Completed: Engine serviced with new distributor cap, leads, and spark plugs, clutch replaced, turbocharger rebuilt, leaking steering rack replaced, cabin air filter replaced, wheels replaced with Saab three-spoke ones. Notes: Car was advertised in Central London, previous owner owned the car for 16 years but wanted to sell it due to London's ULEZ charges imposed on the owner everytime the car is used. Mike brought the car's turbo to a shop that is owned by a former engineer who used to develop turbochargers for Saab cars. Restored car taken to an airfield, where Mike arrived in a Saab 91 Safir aeroplane, paying homage to Saab's aviation heritage.
222	4	2014 Subaru BRZ	£9,000	£8,500	£14,339	£15,500	+£1,161	6 November 2023	TBC
Work Completed: Engine serviced with new gaskets and seals, turbo kit installed for added power and torque, aftermarket exhaust system installed, uprated suspension and anti-roll bars installed, OZ Racing wheels installed, steering wheel retrimmed, Subaru logo decals applied, OEM rear boot spoiler installed. Notes: Newest car featured in the series so far, bought in Northamptonshire. Formerly used as test car at Catesby Tunnel. Restored car taken to Prestwold Driving Centre in Leicestershire, where Elvis revealed that he tuned the car to be able to do full throttle gear shifts.
223	5	1997 Land Rover Discovery	£4,500	£4,250	£7,350	£9,800	+£2,450	13 November 2023	TBC
Work Completed: Body mounts replaced, sunroof replaced, seized high/low-ratio selector linkage freed, full chassis cleaned up, corroded rear wheel arch replaced, new door cards colour matched and installed, new rear window seals installed, headliner retrimmed, corroded body parts welded and repainted. Notes: Low mileage unit with 16,000 original miles, but with no MOT because it had an Advisory Note. Equipped with 3.9 litre V8 engine and automatic transmission. Sold at asking price.
224	6	2004 Audi RS 6	£12,500	£12,500	£14,105	£15,700	+£1,595	20 November 2023	TBC
Work Completed: Engine serviced with new mass airflow sensors and seals, engine oil cooler replaced, engine oil refilled, headlining re-trimmed with new Alcantara fabric, interior trims re-installed, headlight lenses restored, window tint removed, whole car cleaned. Notes: Bought from seller who sold the car on behalf of their boss. Seller provided whole headlining assembly, which required re-trimming. Elvis broke the oil cooler during removal, requiring Mike to purchase a replacement unit. Restored car taken to Bedford Autodrome to be raced against a Porsche 911.
225	7	1985 Ford P100	£8,000	£8,000	£8,617	£10,000	+£1,383	27 November 2023	TBC
Work Completed: Rear crankshaft seal and gasket replaced, heater matrix upgraded with custom made three-row core unit, carburetor auto-choke issues fixed, underbody chassis sealed and sprayed with protectant, wheels repainted, new tyres installed, new spotlights installed. Notes: Imported from South Africa, bought in Scotland. Elvis discovered that a bimetallic strip in the carburetor auto-choke mechanism has been dislocated, which explains the car's rough running. Previous owner converted the car to run on an electric fuel pump. Restored car taken to Queen Elizabeth Country Park, where Mike and Elvis went mountain biking. For the first time in the show's history, Mike was absent during the sale of the car.
226	8	2000 Alfa Romeo GTV	£2,710	£2,000	£4,376	£5,000	+£624	4 December 2023	TBC
Work Completed: Bottom pulley replaced, serpentine belt replaced, suspension arms and springs replaced, damaged injector wire fixed to address misfiring engine, running gear rebuilt with new CV boot, new suspension lower arms, new ball joints, new suspension bushes, new springs, new anti-roll bar drop links, new brake discs, and new calipers, rusted intake pipes re-chromed, new engine cover installed, new exhaust installed, new wheels and tyres installed. Notes: Mike spotted the car on his way to work. Single owner example, sold because the car failed to pass MOT test and the seller could not afford to repair it. Seller had the engine and gearbox replaced by an Alfa Romeo specialist prior to sale. Mike makes his way to Alfaholics in Clevedon to source replacement parts for the GTV. Elvis discovered that injector cable no. 6 has been damaged by a rodent, which he fixed using wires from his personal stock. Mike learned about the Alfa Romeo GTV Cup racing series and managed to contact Marco Coldani, who used to participate at the racing series. Elvis introduced the process of re-chroming at home using a number of chemicals to restore the car's rusted intake pipes. Restored car taken to Parma and then to the Autodromo Riccardo Paletti near Varano for a meeting with Alfa Romeo owners. Sold at asking price.
227	9	1984 Caterham 7	£4,000	£4,000	£10,322	£17,500	+£7,178	18 December 2023	TBC
Work Completed: Gearbox replaced, rear axle replaced, limited-slip differential installed, new exhaust system made and installed, engine rebuilt with new pistons, re-bored cylinders, and skimmed block, carburetors rebuilt, new brakes installed, new suspensions installed, new wheels and tires installed, interior restored with new seats, new steering wheel, and new harnesses, exterior restored with new fenders, new headlights, full respray from red to Riviera Blue, and new decals. Notes: Super Sprint variant with 1.7 litre engine, bought at asking price as a surprise for Elvis, who used to work on Caterham Sevens back in the day. Mike replaced the car's brake master cylinder prior to delivery, as the old one was leaking. Upon restoration, Elvis learned that the car's rear axle came from a Morris Ital, prompting him to buy a Ford rear axle that matches the limited-slip differential that he bought. Restored car taken to a track day at Cadwell Park attended by Caterham enthusiasts, where Elvis reunited with his old colleagues. Sold through online auction.
228	10	1990 Peugeot 405 Mi16	€8,000 (£6,950)	€6,500 (£5,700)	£7,662	£20,000	+£12,338	25 December 2023	TBC
Work Completed: Brake discs, pads, and fluid replaced, starter motor refurbished, full service performed consisting of oil change and air filter replacement, front bumper repaired and repainted, classic car certification inspection performed, Notes: Rust-free right-hand drive UK domestic market model that Mike bought from a dealer in Portugal; the car previously sat for about 20 years prior to purchase. Restoration work was completed in Portugal. In order to check for leaks, Elvis introduced the process of head gasket leak testing using a liquid that reacts to carbon dioxide. Mike advertised the car on eBay. Restoration costs include costs for classic car certification, importation to the United Kingdom, and accommodation during Mike and Elvis' stay in Portugal.

== Compilation episodes ==
Series no.	Episode no.	Title	Scenario (episodes covered)	Original release date
11	15	Archive Show	Series 1 to 11	13 October 2014
12	9	Best Of The USA	US workshop (eps. 1–8)	18 May 2015
12	20	Best Of	U.K. workshop (eps. 10–19)	26 October 2015
13	9	Best Of #1	(eps. 1–8)	11 July 2016
13	18	Best Of #2	(eps. 10–17)	23 January 2017
14	9	The Best of Wheeler Dealers	Ant and Mike hold a Pinewood Derby (eps. 1–8)	29 November 2017
14	18	Petrolhead Takeover	Mike and Ant race RC buggies (eps. 10–17)	7 June 2018
15	9	The Best Of...	Mike buys Ant a pick-up (eps. 1–8)	28 November 2018
15	18	The Best Of... 2	Ant's own 1965 Mustang (eps. 10–17)	22 July 2019
15	27	Mike's Pride and Joy	Mike's own 1982 Porsche 911 SC (eps. 19–26)	3 December 2019
16	15	This Horse Needs To Be Put Out	Crew member's own Ford V6 Mustang (eps. 1 and 3–8)	19 October 2020
16	16	The British are leaving	Ant and Mike pack up the workshop (Series 12 to 16)	22 February 2021
