= List of Top Gear (1977 TV series) episodes =

The following is a complete episode list of the BBC television series Top Gear that ran from April 1977 to December 2001, a total of 524 episodes. After the cancellation of the series in 2001, the BBC were convinced into running a revamped show with a new format, which became the widely popular series of the same title launched in 2002.

== Episodes ==
Top Gear was a series of programmes broadcast by the BBC covering motor related issues, new car model reviews, motor show previews, fuel economy, safety, the police, speeding, insurance, consumer advice and used car sales tips among other issues. Many presenters featured over the course of the series, most notably Angela Rippon, Noel Edmonds, William Woollard, Chris Goffey, Judith Jackson, Sue Baker, Tiff Needell, Jeremy Clarkson, Quentin Willson and Vicki Butler-Henderson.

When it became a network show, it was broadcast on BBC 2 on Thursday nights for Series 1, then on Tuesday nights between Series 2 and Series 17, then reverting to the original Thursday timeslot from Series 18 to the end of its run. In all, 524 episodes (515 plus the nine regional shows) were broadcast between 1977 and 2002, with a large majority of that figure being Top Gear itself.

The original series of the Top Gear programme was broadcast in BBC Midlands region only. There were fourteen programmes, the first of which went out on BBC 1 Midlands, on 22 April 1977, at 10:45 PM. The first episode was pushed back half an hour due to a re-run of Sailor. On the 10th March 1977, this was notably listed on the Black Country Evening Mail, with the title being "Looking for a lady in Top Gear":

WANTED... a mechanical girl.
The BBC at Pebble Mill are conducting the search but it's not a robot they want. Producer Derek Smith is looking for a lady to help present BBC Midlands' new regional motoring programme Top Gear. She must have a reasonably good knowledge of how a car works and a lively interest in transport.
The new monthly programme starts on April 22 (BBC1, 10.15).
Derek Smith says: "We want to cover every aspect from the point of view of the road user... two wheels or 16, it makes no difference."
"We shall cover fuel economy, safety, the police, speeding, insurance, second hand cars, holiday touring and so on."
"Special features will include a car-care item and a driving competition to find the Top Gear driver of the year."

The dates for the BBC 1 Midlands run of Top Gear are as follow ("RMD" code stands for "Regional Midlands"):

- 22nd April 1977 - RMD9037D - Angela Rippon drives up the M1 in her Ford Capri, at a steady and safe 70 miles per hour, talking about the correct use of mirrors on the motorway, and Tom Coyne interviews William Rodgers, the minister of Transport, who reveals his hopes for the introduction of seat belts and curbs on drink-drivers. Sindrom Hull reports on how the police catches speeding motorists, and Mike Woodhead with BBC TV producer John Burkill participate in a economy run.
- 20th May 1977 - RMDxxxxY - Angela looks at the whole problem presented by the 40 million tons - including five million tons of dangerous waste - we move around every year. She calls them "loads of trouble." They are the lorries and tankers which transport dangerous material. And with 600 different chemical substances regularly in transit on our roads, the potential danger is there. "Drivers get little or no training about the stuff they carry", she said. "Or the action to take in emergencies." "They seldom follow prescribed routes and overnight parking in back streets could make them potential bombs." Joining Top Gear tonight is Mary Johns, a journalist from Kempsey, near Worcester. Her job is to show how to do your own car-care with some simple, but important jobs even the mechanical duffers can do. Plus, behind the scenes with motorway police patrols and car & caravan spot checks with Tom Coyne.
- 24th June 1977 - RMDxxxxY - Tom Coyne introduces this motoring contribution to the Silver Jubilee scene. When the Queen was crowned, Britain's best selling car was the Morris Minor and the most coveted was the Jaguar XK120, but the biggest technical revolution of them all was to be the Mini. In these 25 years motorists have lost starting handles and opening windscreens and gained 10,000-mile service intervals and long-life guarantees. Angela Rippon reports on the problems of motor-cyclists, Mary Johns and Stan Evans deliver another piece of consumer advice on car maintenance and a look at 25 years of cars (1952-1977) with Tom Coyne.
- 29th July 1977 - RMDxxxxY - Angela Rippon brings viewers up to date on the "Queensway row." Two months ago when a lump of concrete fell from Birmingham's ring road onto a parked car beneath it sent reverberations through the city which are still being felt today. A Sunday newspaper commissioned an engineering consultant, Mr. Bernard Clarke, to make a report and his conclusions were that the ring road was falling apart. Three reports have now emerged from the city's engineers which conflict with the original. What is the true situation? Plus, Tom Coyne reports on car customisation with enthusiasts.
- 26th August 1977 - RMDxxxxY - The Top Gear Forum with Dr. Peter Gloyns (Accident Research Unit, Birmingham University), Philip Knights (West Midlands Chief Constable), Duncan McKenzie (British Insurance Association), and Ron Ruscoe (Motor Agents Association). With Tom Coyne.
- 13th September 1977 - RMDxxxxY - Angela Rippon performs a winter driving technique practice on the Staffordshire Police skid pan, and reports on the problems with Pershore's town sign. Mary Johns and Stan Evans continue their usual car-care advice, and the Midlands motorway patrol police introduce the new motorway signs, as to what they mean for the motorist.
- 27th September 1977 (Top Gear Special) - RMDxxxxY - Special edition on stopping a car thief and what to do after a motoring accident. With Joan Palmer and Mike Woodhead.
- 11th October 1977 - RMDxxxxY - Angela Rippon reports on tachographs in lorries, Mike Woodhead reports on the Veteran Car Run to sample vintage champagne in France with Mike Broad, Mary Johns provides advice on tackling a mis-firing engine, and Tom Coyne reports on car customization.
- 25th October 1977 (Top Gear Special) - RMDxxxxY - A debate for and against seatbelt usage with Dr. Murray Mackay (Accident Research Unit, Birmingham University) and Jackie Stewart. With Joan Palmer and Mike Woodhead.
- 15th November 1977 - RMDxxxxY - Tom Coyne reports on the Design-A-Poster competition result, Mike Broad and former Wheelbase presenter Judith Jackson preview the 1977 Lombard RAC Rally with commentary, and Tom Coyne alongside Judith Jackson provide consumer advice on car care.
- 2nd December 1977 - RMDxxxxY - Angela Rippon provides commentary on this year's brand-new London Motorfair and Tom Coyne reports on car customisation. Angela could not provide commentary at Middleton Hall due to her news-casting duties, after being named "Show Business Personality of the Year", with the most-quoted nickname on newspapers (like the Atherstone & Coleshill Herald) being "Legs".
- 3rd January 1978 - RMDxxxxY - 20 Miles to the Magnum: A look back at the Veteran car run to France. Presented by Tom Coyne.
- 31st January 1978 - RMDxxxxY - The Top Gear Forum with Dr. Peter Gloyns (Accident Research Unit, Birmingham University), Philip Knights (West Midlands Chief Constable), Duncan McKenzie (British Insurance Association), and Ron Ruscoe (Motor Agents Association), answering questions given by the audience. With Tom Coyne.
- 3rd March 1978 - RMDxxxxY - Rippon on the Road: Angela Rippon looks back on the first year of Top Gear in reports and highlights.

Series	Editions	Start date	End date	Comments
Series 0 (Regional)	14	22 April 1977	3 March 1978	First appearance of Angela Rippon, Mike Woodhead, Mike Dornan and Judith Jackson; First and last appearance of Tom Coyne, John Burkill, Mary Johns, Stan Evans, Joan Palmer, Sindrom Hull, Philip Knights, Duncan McKenzie, Ron Ruscoe and Dr. Peter Gloyns
Series 1	10	13 July 1978	14 September 1978	First appearance of Barrie Gill; Last appearance of Mike Woodhead
Series 2	10	1 May 1979	3 July 1979	First appearance of Gill Pyrah and Noel Edmonds; Last appearance of Angela Rippon and Barrie Gill
Series 3	6	1 April 1980	20 May 1980	First appearance of Frank Page, Peter Macann and Marian Foster; First and last appearance of Wheelbase presenter Gordon Wilkins; Last appearance of Gill Pyrah
Series 4	7	2 September 1980	21 October 1980	First appearance of Sue Baker; Last appearance of Noel Edmonds, Marian Foster, Peter Macann, Gill Pyrah and Mike Dornan
Series 5	8	21 April 1981	9 June 1981	First appearance of Chris Goffey; First and last appearance of Merril Bolton
Series 6	7	3 November 1981	15 December 1981	First appearance of William Woollard, Tom Boswell and Stewart Woodcock; First and last appearance of Peter Smith, Martin Duffy and Dan Cherrington
Series 7	8	13 April 1982	1 June 1982	First appearance of Tom Boswell, First and last appearance of Martin Muncaster, Last appearance of Stewart Woodcock and Tom Boswell
Series 8	7	7 September 1982	29 January 1983	First and last appearance of Bob Friend; Last appearance of Judith Jackson
Series 9	8	2 March 1983	19 April 1983	
Series 10	8	6 September 1983	25 October 1983	First appearance of John Miles and David Minton; Last appearance of Chris Goffey
Series 11	8	28 February 1984	25 April 1984	First and last appearance of Tony Baker and Konrad Bartelski
Series 12	7	23 October 1984	11 December 1984	First appearance of William Horsley; Re-appearance of Chris Goffey; First and last appearance of David Willey; Last appearance of John Miles
Series 13	9	5 March 1985	30 April 1985	First appearance of Peter Burgess; Last appearance of David Minton and William Horsley
Series 14	8	3 September 1985	22 October 1985	
Series 15	10	8 April 1986	10 June 1986	First and last appearance of Russell Bray; Last appearance of Peter Burgess
Series 16	8	9 September 1986	28 October 1986	
Series 17	8	7 April 1987	26 May 1987	First and last appearance of Alan Sutton; First appearance of Tiff Needell and Tony Mason; Brief re-appearance of Dan Cherrington
Series 18	11	10 September 1987	19 November 1987	
Series 19	8	7 April 1988	22nd September 1988	First appearance of Beki Adam
Series 20	8	29 September 1988	17 November 1988	First appearance of Jeremy Clarkson; Re-appearance of Tom Boswell; First and last appearance of Jon Bentley; Last appearance of Frank Page
Series 21	8	21 March 1989	9 May 1989	First appearance of Vic Allan
Series 22	10	14 September 1989	16 November 1989	Last appearance of Vic Allan
Series 23	8	27 March 1990	15 May 1990	First and last appearance of Simon Barnes; Last appearance of Tom Boswell
Series 24	10	27 September 1990	29 November 1990	First appearance of Mark Forsyth; Last appearance of Beki Adam
Series 25	10	28 February 1991	2 May 1991	Last appearance of William Woollard and Sue Baker
Series 26	14	19 September 1991	19 December 1991	First appearance of Quentin Willson, Michele Newman, Janet Trewin and Nicky Fox; First and last appearance of Michael Collie and Sue Beardsmore; Last appearance of Mark Forsyth
Series 27	11	27 February 1992	7 May 1992	First appearance of Steve Lee; First and last appearance of Helen Mound and Peter Wilson
Series 28	14	24 September 1992	24 December 1992	First appearance of Ross Dunkerton; First and last appearance of Steve Johnson and Zoe Harris; Last appearance of Nicky Fox
Series 29	17	18 February 1993	10 June 1993	First and last appearance of John Withington; Last appearance of Steve Lee
Series 30	16	9 September 1993	30 December 1993	First appearance of Steve Berry
Series 31	11	3 March 1994	12 May 1994	Last appearance of Janet Trewin
Series 32	13	22 September 1994	5 January 1995	First appearance of Andy Wilman; First and last appearance of Russell Bulgin and Vicki Butler-Henderson; Last appearance of Ross Dunkerton
Series 33	13	16 February 1995	11 May 1995	
Series 34	14	21 September 1995	21 December 1995	Re-appearance of Jon Bentley
Series 35	14	15 February 1996	20 July 1996	
Series 36	16	5 September 1996	19 December 1996	
Series 37	20	2 January 1997	15 May 1997	Re-appearance of Vicki Butler-Henderson; Last appearance of Chris Goffey
Series 38	17	4 September 1997	22 December 1997	Last appearance of Jon Bentley
Series 39	14	19 February 1998	23 May 1998	
Series 40	16	10 September 1998	21 December 1998	First appearance of Julia Bradbury, Alex Riley and Richard Porter; First and last appearance of Adrian Chiles and Damon Hill; Last appearance of Jeremy Clarkson, Michele Newman and Tony Mason
Series 41	12	18 March 1999	3 June 1999	First and last appearance of James May, Steve Punt, Jay Kay and Brendan Coogan; Last appearance of Steve Berry, Julia Bradbury and Andy Wilman
Series 42	14	9 September 1999	16 December 1999	First appearance of Kate Humble
Series 43	18	20 January 2000	25 May 2000	Last appearance of Kate Humble, Richard Porter and Quentin Willson
Series 44	16	7 September 2000	11 February 2001	First appearance of Jason Barlow and Adrian Simpson; Re-appearance of Andy Wilman
Series 45	37	22 February 2001	4 February 2002	Last appearance of Tiff Needell, Andy Wilman, Vicki Butler-Henderson, Alex Riley, Jason Barlow and Adrian Simpson

Note: The timeslots for Series 45 varied, so not all episodes were broadcast consecutively each week.

=== "Series 46" and "Series 47" ===
As per the "BBC Top Gear Infax" document provided by Des & Mick, which was compiled using BBC's Programme-as-Broadcast documents on Top Gear, this can be seen under the first episode of Series 45:

1/15 in new series of motorng magazine pres by Jason BARLOW w Adrian SIMPSON, Vicki BUTLER-HENDERSON & Tiff NEEDELL;itms re Renault Laguna II,Secnd Hand Audis & Mercedes,Hyundai Santa Fe,Lamborghini Muira V6,Rover,Eco Basic etc.

Information above suggests that Series 45 was originally envisioned as 15-part, which means that Series 46 "started" from Series 45, Episode 16, broadcast on 14th June 2001.

Additionally, the original version of Series 45, Episode 31 (which under the Series 46 labeling would have been Series 46, Episode 16), this can be heard during the outro sequence as narrated by Jason Barlow:

There is no Top Gear next week, because it's football - but we'll be back in two weeks with the last programme in the series, including BMW's dramatic new 7-Series, Jaguar's sensual R-Coupe, and the last Rolls-Royce ever, to be made in Crewe.

On the actual broadcast BBC Two version, the outro sequence is edited, as the "last programme in the series" mention is replaced with the Porsche 911 GT2 being mentioned and the "no Top Gear next week because of football" being removed, as it was meant to be for the episode after (due to the BBC showing Match of the Day Live: Helsingborgs IF v Ipswich Town football match coverage, which takes up the usual Top Gear slot, moving Series 45, Episode 33 subsequently to 8th November 2001):

There is no Top Gear next week, but we'll be back in two weeks with BMW's dramatic new 7-Series, Porsche's wild 911 GT2, Jaguar's sensual R-Coupe, and the last Rolls-Royce ever, to be made in Crewe.

The possible reasoning as to why "Series 46" was radically different to Series 45, could be a result of BBC Two's controller Jane Root "axing" Top Gear in August 2001, resulting in the segments being filmed much more differently than previously due to potential budget problems.

All of this means that Series 45, Episode 32, being Series 46, Episode 17, was the "last episode" of Series 46, as Series 47 would start on the 8th November 2001, with Jason Barlow and Adrian Simpson assessing the Ford Focus - the teased 911 GT2 segment was moved to Series 45, Episode 34 (or Series 47, Episode 2), broadcast on 15th November 2001.

This is BBC Genome's listing for Series 45, Episode 35 (or Series 47, Episode 3):

The motoring magazine returns for a new ten-part series. Vicki Butler-Henderson sizes up the new Volkswagen Polo, while Jason Barlow and Adrian Simpson report on BMW's fortunes in the competitive executive-car market.

And as this goes, this suggests that Series 47 was supposed to be 10-part, especially noticeable by the segment placement in those November-December 2001 episodes.

At the start of Series 45, Episode 36 (or Series 47, Episode 4), Jason Barlow is heard saying this piece to the camera:

On tonight's Top Gear, in this, the last of our four specials, focusing on the nation's best-sellers, we examine a market segment that was actually... extinct, 10 years ago; the roadster.

From the originally planned 10 programmes, only 5 materialized, with the last one being Top Gear Awards 2002 broadcast on 4th February 2002.

To summarize, Series 45, despite having 37 programmes on account (two of them being specials), was at one point internally split to 15-part, then 16-part with the next series, and then originally 10-part (but only half was made out of the original ten). Series 45 can be still called the longest series of Top Gear due to it being troublesome during production (meaning that the "Series 46" and "Series 47" can be disregarded), but it also can be split to Series 45, 46 and 47 respectively, making Series 37 the longest ever ran series of Top Gear.

== Spin-offs ==
=== Top Gear Rally Report ===
Rally Report was a series of programmes broadcast by the BBC dedicated to broadcasting previews, highlights and reports of the Lombard RAC Rally, and latterly, the final round of the World Rally Championship. William Woollard presented in studio segments, whilst Sue Baker, or Tony Mason in later years, presented the location reports on the stages. There are sixty five episodes in all, produced between 1984 and 1998, including all specials, but excluding the preview of the 1995 RAC Rally, as the total episodes for that series is unknown.

Series	Editions	Start date	End date
Series 1	6	24 November 1984	29 November 1984
Series 2	1	30 November 1985	
Series 3	1	20 November 1986	
Series 4	1	26 November 1987	
Series 5	1	26 November 1988	
Series 6	1	23 November 1989	
Series 7	1	12 May 1990	
Series 8	8	21 November 1992	25 November 1992
Series 9	1	1 January 1993	
Series 10	8	20 November 1993	24 November 1993
Series 11	1	23 December 1993	
Series 12	9	19 November 1994	23 November 1994
Series 13	1	26 December 1994	
Series 14	1	17 November 1995	22 February 1996
Series 15	7	19 November 1995	22 November 1995
Series 16	1	25 December 1995	
Series 17	5	22 November 1996	25 November 1996
Series 18	1	9 January 1997	
Series 19	5	22 November 1997	25 November 1997
Series 20	1	31 December 1997	
Series 21	4	21 November 1998	24 November 1998
Series 22	1	20 December 1998	

=== Top Gear Motorsport ===
Top Gear Motorsport was a series of programmes broadcast by the BBC covering various forms of motorsport such as the World Rally Championship, the British Rally Championship, British Formula Three, Formula Renault and Formula Vauxhall Junior racing, as well as British Superbike and Eurocar challenges. Tiff Needell presented the show throughout the show's run. The programme was broadcast weekly on a Friday timeslot. The show was broadcast between 1994 and 1998, and ninety four episodes were produced in all, including specials.

Series	Editions	Start date	End date
Series 1	1	10 November 1994	
Series 2	9	24 March 1995	19 May 1995
Series 3	15	27 October 1995	2 February 1996
Series 4	1	20 December 1995	
Series 5	12	5 April 1996	21 June 1996
Series 6	8	30 September 1996	20 December 1996
Series 7	2	10 March 1997	17 March 1997
Series 8	11	31 March 1997	21 June 1997
Series 9	10	29 August 1997	14 November 1997
Series 10	25	6 April 1998	16 November 1998

=== Top Gear Take 2 ===
Top Gear Take 2 was a series of programmes broadcast by the BBC looking back on previous segments of Top Gear over the years. Each programme ran for fifteen minutes on BBC Two, with repeats surfacing in 1997, on the then new UK Horizons. Presenters included Quentin Willson, Steve Berry, Jeremy Clarkson and Tiff Needell. The show was broadcast between 1992 and 1999, with fifty six episodes being produced.

Series	Editions	Start date	End date
Series 1	5	23 July 1992	14 September 1992
Series 2	11	6 January 1993	22 September 1993
Series 3	6	8 January 1994	4 October 1994
Series 4	10	31 May 1995	8 September 1995
Series 5	4	17 January 1996	16 June 1996
Series 6	1	31 July 1997	31 July 1997
Series 7	8	13 July 1998	17 August 1998
Series 8	11	1 February 1999	23 December 1999

=== Top Gear Waterworld ===
Top Gear Waterworld was a series of programmes broadcast by the BBC covering water based vehicles, and various activities related to them, such as Citroën 2CV river racing in Brittany, and how to ease traffic congestion in London by using water transport on the River Thames. The series was presented by Jeremy Clarkson, Tiff Needell and Julia Bradbury. The show was broadcast in 1998, with ten episodes being produced.

Series	Editions	Start date	End date	Production codes
Series 1	6	23 July 1998	3 September 1998	E01: NBHG476J; E02: NBHG477D; E03: NBHG478X; E04: NBHG479R; E05: NBHG480K; E06: NBHG481E

=== Top Gear GTi ===
Top Gear GTi was a series of programmes broadcast by the BBC covering a variety of features such as car reviews, special features such as attending a driving school and motor shows. Essentially, GTi is an expansion on the main programme. The series was mainly presented by Vicki Butler-Henderson, although Steve Berry and Jason Bradbury appeared on the show at times. The show was the last of the spin off series' of Top Gear to be broadcast, airing between September 1999 and May 2001, with more than one hundred episodes in its name. Unlike any other spin off, Top Gear GTi was broadcast on a near daily timeslot on the UK Horizons channel.

Series	Editions	Start date	End date
Series 1	13	September 1999	December 1999
Series 2	13	January 2000	May 2000
Series 3	13	September 2000	December 2000
Series 4	13	January 2001	May 2001

== Top Gear Specials ==
Various specials of Top Gear were produced during the show's initial run, each of them having a particular theme to the show.

Title	Release date	Featured
Top Gear Special: Emergency	27 September 1977	Special edition on stopping a car thief and what to do after a motoring accident. With Joan Palmer and Mike Woodhead.
Top Gear Special: For And Against Seatbelts	25 October 1977	A debate for and against seatbelt usage with Dr. Murray Mackay (Accident Research Unit, Birmingham University) and Jackie Stewart. With Joan Palmer and Mike Woodhead.
Top Gear Special: 20 Miles To The Magnum	3 January 1978	A look back at the Veteran car run to France. Presented by Tom Coyne.
Top Gear Special: 4x4s	7 September 1978	Top Gear invited international teams of four-wheel-drive vehicles to decide who is King of the Country. Could cross-country cars from the US, France, Japan or Russia break the time put up by the British Land Rovers round a specially designed course through the mud of tank terrain in Dorset? Presented by Barrie Gill.
Top Gear Turns Back The Clock	21 October 1980	When the Veteran Car Club celebrated its Golden Jubilee with a rally of 250 old and beautiful cars, Top Gear cameras joined the get-out-and-get-under boys to try to find out more about their love affair with a car. Presented by Noel Edmonds.
Top Gear Special: 1981 Lombard RAC Rally	24 November 1981	Top Gear sets out to cover some of the most exciting action on this year's Rally and in particular the progress of Tony Pond in the Dealer Team Vauxhall Chevette and Mike Jackson, 'the one-armed rally driver', in a Ford Escort. Presented by William Woollard.
Top Gear Special: The Oil Business	11 May 1982	From a Forties production platform William Woollard finds out what happens to the oil on its way to the petrol pump. Sue Baker examines the issue of lead in petrol and Whether there is a future for liquid petroleum gas as a viable alternative fuel. The oil companies reveal their marketing plans to change the face of the garage forecourt in the 80s.
Top Gear Special: A Ring Around London	3 November 1982	The first plan to build an orbital road was in 1906 and by the mid-1980s the M25 dream should become a reality. But questions still remain. Will a road 20 miles from the city centre do anything to ease London's traffic jams? Is it the right kind of motorway but in the wrong place? Did we learn anything from the French experience building the Peripherique round Paris? William Woollard examines the likely effects of the M25 on London.
Top Gear Special: Belt Up	29 January 1983	Introduced by William Woollard. From midnight on 30th January it becomes law for most drivers and front-seat passengers to wear a seat belt. But who is exempt? How are the police going to administer the law? What happens if you are caught not wearing a seat belt? Answering questions from the motoring public are Jackie Stewart, long-time advocate of seat belts Dr. Murray Mackay and Chief Constable of Warwickshire Constabulary Roger Birch.
Top Gear Special: Rust	13 March 1984	Rust, an insatiable car-killer and the scourge of every motorist, is as big a problem now as it ever was. Each year rust eats its way through millions of vehicles and devours millions of pounds, straight out of the motorists' pocket. William Woollard checks out the consumers' rights, and examines the controversial, highly competitive world of rust-proofing services.
Top Gear Special: Rally Special 86	20 November 1986	For the past four days, the forests of Britain have resounded as the entrants for this year's Lombard RAC Rally covered an exacting 1,500 miles. Has Lancia managed to stave off the challenge from Peugeot and the Metro 6R4 to repeat last year's triumph? In a special Top Gear report, William Woollard brings you the highlights of this prestigious event with commentary from Barrie Gill.
Top Gear: First on the Grid	3 June 1988	Throughout 1987, Top Gear followed the first year of Formula First, a cheap new racing car formula for the novice driver. In the money-dominated world of racing, Formula First set out to eliminate all differences except driver ability, to let the real talent shine through. One make of car, one type of tyre and no scope for engine tuning or suspension modification. Chris Goffey reports on the excitement of the year's racing and Tiff Needell assesses the car's performance.
Top Gear: Car of the Decade	22 September 1988	William Woollard presents a special focusing on the best cars produced per decade, up to the 1980s, using clips of the Car of the Decade segments from Series 18.
Top Gear: The Great Chase	21 March 1989	1988 Pirelli Classic Car Rally coverage. Narrated by Chris Serle.
Top Gear: Return of the Silver Stork	11 October 1990	Production of the exclusive Hispano Suiza cars stopped more than 50 years ago - today it is rare to even see one in public. Willie Rushton accompanied 40 of them on a nostalgic visit to their native Spain.
Top Gear: Reverse Gear (1991)	27 December 1991	Highlights of Series 25-26 with Chris Goffey, Jeremy Clarkson and Quentin Willson.
Top Gear: Reverse Gear (1992)	24 December 1992	Highlights of Series 27-28 with Jeremy Clarkson and Quentin Willson.
Top Gear Special: Ferrari – The Italian Legend	28 October 1993	Jeremy Clarkson discovers the Italian Legend - Ferrari, the car marque he consdiers to be a steel deity and sex on wheels, as he drives the Ferrari Daytona and the Ferrari 456.
Top Gear: Rolls-Royce Alpine Challenge	20 December 1993	In 1912, a Rolls-Royce Silver Ghost entered the 1,700-mile Austrian Alpine Trial challenge but failed to get up the first hill. So incensed were the makers that they sent back a team of cars the following year and swept the board. Last June, nearly 50 ancient Ghosts celebrated the 80th anniversary of the achievement by driving the course again. Jeremy Clarkson and Tony Mason reports.
Top Gear: Christmas Special	22 December 1994	Steve Berry presents the special by letting Ross Dunkerton report on a rally, Vicki Butler-Henderson on modified Skodas and show audition tapes of "potential" Top Gear presenters, as part of the Wrong Gear collection. Jeremy Clarkson's Motorworld is teased.
Top Gear: Klausen Run	5 January 1995	Tony Mason covers the 1994 Klausen Run.
Top Gear: Classic and Sportscar Show	7 May 1995	Jeremy Clarkson, Quentin Willson and Michele Newman visit the Classics & Sportscar Show at the NEC.
Top Gear: The Oh So Beautiful Bugatti	18 April 1995	Chris Goffey reports on the celebration of Ettore Bugatti and the Bugatti car company.
Top Gear Special: The Search for the Silver Arrow	22 April 1996	A Top Gear special investigating the mysterious affair of a missing pre-war Mercedes W154 Grand Prix racing car, bought by a millionaire car collector, and lost when the Ceausescu regime in Romania collapsed. The year-long search involves defections, restraining orders, court hearings and organised crime.
Top Gear Live (1996)	20 July 1996	Last Thursday, the world's first interactive motor show, Top Gear Live, opened at Silverstone, giving the public the chance to go for a test drive on the circuit that recently staged the British Grand Prix. The Top Gear team reports from the five-day event whose attractions include motorcycle stunts, monster trucks, new cars, classic designs, karts and off-road vehicles. Presented by Jeremy Clarkson, Quentin Willson, Tiff Needell, Michele Newman, Tony Mason and Steve Berry.
Top Gear: London to Brighton	19 December 1996	Quentin Willson, Steve Berry and Michele Newman join nearly 700 cars and drivers from 23 countries on the centenary London-to-Brighton run.
Top Gear Special: Aston Martin	2 January 1997	Jeremy Clarkson covers the story of Aston Martin, from their beginnings, to their James Bond recognition, up to the current state of it, with the Aston Martin DB7.
Top Gear Special: Lombard RAC Rally	9 January 1997	Contestants in last November's Network Q RAC Rally faced some of the worst weather conditions for decades, and more than half the entries failed to finish because of heavy snow and sheet ice. Tiff Needell, who was one of the hardy competitors to complete the 1,100-mile trip around Britain, recounts the inside story of the event.
Top Gear: The TVR Story	22 December 1997	Jeremy Clarkson, Vicki Butler-Henderson and Tiff Needell cover the history of TVR, the car manufacturer, up to 1997.
Top Gear Live (1998)	23 May 1998	This weekend, visitors to Top Gear's exhibition at Silverstone can try their hand at various challenges, including high-speed circuits and off-roading. Tiff Needell and Jeremy Clarkson are heading teams in a series of bumper-to-bumper clashes, and Quentin Willson watches over the Top Gear presenters' road rivalry.
Top Gear: Blood, Salt and Tears – 100 Years of the Land Speed Record	21 December 1998	Tiff Needell covers the centenary of the land speed record, up to the latest land speed record.
Top Gear: 21 Years of Top Gear	16 December 1999	Has Top Gear come of age? Kate Humble lets former and current presenters of Top Gear speak out on their favourite moments, least favourite moments, what was their memorable item presented on Top Gear, and many more.
Top Gear Awards 2000	10 February 2000	The best and worst cars of 1999. Presented by Kate Humble, Quentin Willson, Vicki Butler-Henderson and Tiff Needell.
Top Gear Awards 2001	11 February 2001	The best and worst cars of 2000. Presented by Jason Barlow, Adrian Simpson, Vicki Butler-Henderson and Tiff Needell.
Top Gear: Value For Money Special	2 August 2001	The Top Gear team helps members of the public in choosing their new car, as well as provides tips on saving money on petrol. Considerably a "pilot" of what would later become a spin-off in itself a year later; Wrong Car, Right Car.
Top Gear Awards 2002	4 February 2002	The best and worst cars of 2001. Presented by Jason Barlow.
