= Tom Ross (producer) =

Tom Ross (born 1947) is a Scottish journalist and television producer who worked for the BBC from 1971 until 1996.

BBC

== Early life ==
Born in Glasgow and educated at Hutchesons' Boys' Grammar School he gained a master's degree in history from the University of Glasgow.

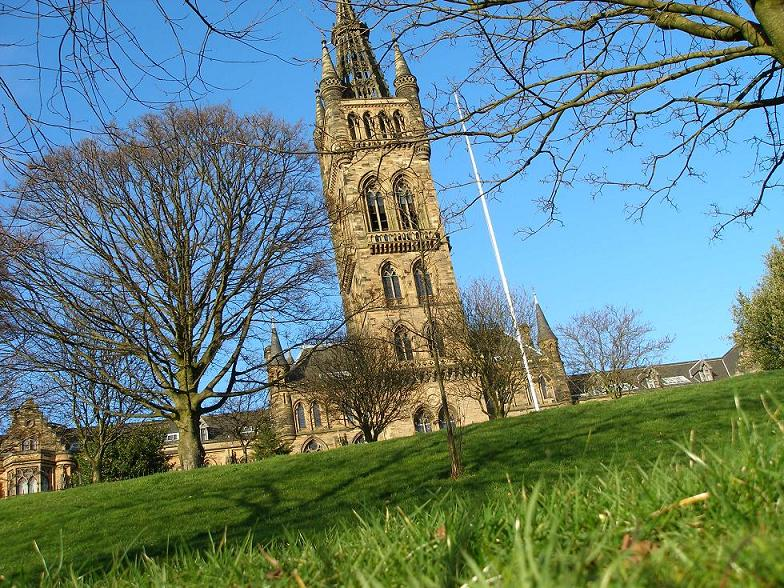
University of Glasgow

== Career ==
He began his BBC career as a News Trainee in London - part of an intake of six trainee journalists that included David Davies, later Executive Director of the Football Association, and Brian Hanrahan the BBC Correspondent famous for the "I Counted Them Out, I Counted Them Back" report during the Falklands War.

== 1973 ==
After spells with the BBC2 political programme Westminster with David Holmes and the Radio 4 Today Programme with John Timpson and Robert Robinson he joined BBC Scotland's Television Current Affairs department in Glasgow in 1973.

== 1983 ==
Under Matthew Spicer he directed and produced Current Account and Public Account with Donald MacCormick, James Cox and Andrew Neil and in 1983 ran BBC Scotland's highly successful General Election Coverage.

== 1984 ==
In 1984 he moved to Birmingham to become Assistant Editor of the BBC's popular lunchtime magazine Pebble Mill at One. producing one of its highest rated shows live from the aircraft carrier HMS Ark Royal in the English Channel.

== 1986 ==
In 1986 he became first Executive Producer, then Editor in 1989, of the BBC2 motoring magazine Top Gear. During his five-year spell as Editor Motoring Programmes for the BBC Top Gear became the top rated show on BBC2 for the first time and the audience reached nearly 6 million. This was despite several determined efforts by various Controllers of BBC2 to cancel the programme.

The main presenter of the programme was William Woollard with contributions from Chris Goffey, Frank Page and Sue Baker. A number of new faces were introduced over these years including Tiff Needell, Tom Boswell and, most famously, Jeremy Clarkson.

The Top Gear team also produced coverage of the bi-annual British International Motor Show which alternated with London Motorfair. Noel Edmonds and Janet Ellis of Blue Peter fame were among its most famous presenters.

Rallying was the one sport that BBC Sport in London did not control. Each November Top Gear Rally Report provided nightly coverage and background programmes on the Lombard RAC Rally, then the last round of the World Rally Championship. Presented by William Woollard with reports from Barrie Gill and Tony Mason the programmes developed a loyal audience despite frequent attempts by BBC bosses to kill it. Tony Mason went on to join Top Gear, initially as its rally specialist.

== 1991 ==
After Tom Ross left the programme in 1991 he went on to work in various managerial posts till he left the BBC five years later. He then worked for a spell in the independent sector.

== Family ==
He is married with two children and lives in Warwickshire.
