= Top Gear (1977 TV series) =

British motoring TV show (1977–2001)

- 1993–1998 title card
- Created by: Derek Smith
- Presented by: Main Presenters; Angela Rippon (1977-1979); Noel Edmonds (1979-1980); Chris Goffey (1981-1983, 1984); Tony Baker (1984); Peter Burgess (1985-1986); Tiff Needell (1987-2001); Jeremy Clarkson (1988-1998); James May (1999); Kate Humble (1999-2000); Jason Barlow (2000-2001); Panellists; Sue Baker; Jason Barlow; Stephen Bayley; Jon Bentley; Steve Berry; Tom Boswell; Julia Bradbury; Russell Bulgin; Vicki Butler-Henderson; Jeremy Clarkson; Michael Collie; Brendan Coogan; Tom Coyne; Mike Dornan; Noel Edmonds; Marian Foster; Nicky Fox; Bob Friend; Barrie Gill; Chris Goffey; Kate Humble; Judith Jackson; Steve Johnson; Stephen Lee; David Llewellin; Peter Macann; Tony Mason; James May; Stirling Moss; Tiff Needell; Michele Newman; Frank Page; Gill Pyrah; Eric Richard; Angela Rippon; Adrian Simpson; Quentin Willson; Andy Wilman; Malcolm Wilson; Stewart Woodcock; William Woollard
- Opening theme: "Jessica" – The Allman Brothers Band
- Ending theme: "Out of the Blue" (from Blue Moves) – Elton John
- Country of origin: United Kingdom
- Original language: English
- No. of series: 45
- No. of episodes: 524 (list of episodes)

Production
- Producers: Dennis Adams; Jon Bentley; Phil Franklin; Ken Pollock; Tom Ross; Derek Smith; Brian Strachan; Andy Wilman
- Production location: Pebble Mill Studios
- Running time: 30 minutes
- Production company: BBC Birmingham

Original release
- Network: BBC1 Midlands (1977–1978); BBC2 (1978–2001)
- Release: 22 April 1977 – 17 December 2001

Related
- Wheelbase; Top Gear (2002); Top Gear Motorsport; The Car's the Star; Fifth Gear

Top Gear is a British motoring magazine programme created by the BBC that aired on BBC Two between 22 April 1977 and 17 December 2001. The programme focused on a range of motoring topics, the most common being car reviews, road safety and consumer advice. Originally presented by Angela Rippon and Tom Coyne, the show saw a range of different presenters and reporters front the programme's half-hourly slots, including Noel Edmonds, Jeremy Clarkson, Tiff Needell, William Woollard and Quentin Willson. The programme proved popular during the late 1980s and early 1990s, and launched a number of spin-offs, including its own magazine entitled Top Gear Magazine.

By 1999, viewing figures in Top Gear had declined following the departure of notable presenters, leading to the BBC cancelling the programme in 2001. While a number of presenters and production staff moved over to Channel 5 to produce Fifth Gear, Clarkson and fellow presenter Andy Wilman convinced the BBC to revive the programme under a revamped format, relaunching it in October 2002.

== Format ==
Top Gear functioned under a magazine format focusing on key topics that could be covered within each episode's 30-minute timeslot. Presenters focused on various motoring-related subjects, the most common being road tests of new cars, consumer advice, road safety, and motorsport.

== History ==
=== Origins ===
The original programme and its title were conceived by producer Derek Smith, who proposed the concept to BBC Midlands as a monthly television series with a magazine format aimed at looking at various subjects such as new cars, road safety and other topics, and involving presenters supported by reporters. The format had already been proven by Thames Television's well established Drive-In (later Wheels), which had been running since 1974, and featured future Top Gear presenters Chris Goffey and Sue Baker. BBC Midlands commissioned a series of nine episodes of Top Gear for 1977, with the production staff operating out of Pebble Mill Studios, Birmingham, with Smith assigned as its executive producer, while Angela Rippon and Tom Coyne, the front man of the local evening news programme Midlands Today, were hired to present the new programme alongside local reporters including Pebble Mill At One broadcaster Marian Foster who was one of the first to have a presenter/roving reporter role. As it was designed mainly as a regional programme, Top Gear was made available only to BBC Midlands viewers during its broadcast.

In 1978, the BBC took interest in Top Gear, and decided upon it being broadcast nationally across the United Kingdom, commissioning ten episodes for the first series. Both Smith and Rippon remained within their respective roles, with Barrie Gill replacing Coyne as co-presenter, with topics covered during its first series including holiday driving, the MOT test, a search for a female rally driver, traffic jams, rust and corrosion, and tachographs in lorries. Alongside the standard motoring topics, the production staff also included films focused on motoring events, such as the Le Mans 24 Hour race and the British International Motor Show. A year later, the BBC commissioned a second series, with Rippon and Gill retaining their roles and joined by a new team of reporters.

=== 1980s–1990s ===
By 1980, the growing popularity of the programme led to the BBC making Top Gear a staple part of its schedules for BBC2, commissioning two series per year - one for the late winter / early spring schedule, and the other for the autumn / early winter schedule. However, as Rippon and Gill had left the programme after its second series, the responsibility of presenting Top Gear was assigned to Noel Edmonds, who maintained the role of the main presenter for two series before being replaced by William Woollard, formerly of BBC1's science series Tomorrow's World, in 1981. Former Drive-In / Wheels presenters Chris Goffey and Sue Baker defected from Thames to the BBC and Top Gear around the same period.

The role of executive producer was maintained by Smith for a further three years before it was handed over to Dennis Adams in 1983. Between 1980 and 1985, the programme's broadcast included specials that focused on coverage of motoring events, including the bi-annual British International Motor Show, and the London Motorfair, though Top Gear achieved sole dominance of rallying events, a sport that the BBC's sport division could not control.

In 1986, Dennis Adams resigned as executive producer, leading to Tom Ross being hired as his replacement, going on to become editor in 1988, leaving his former role to Jon Bentley and Ken Pollock. By this time, the programme underwent a number of subtle changes in its presentation, despite reported threats within the BBC for its cancellation, which were aimed at raising its profile and increasing its audience through a wider range of motoring topics - these included consumer issues, classic cars, motorbikes, and a wide range of motorsport events. Around this time, Top Gear began to see the involvement of new presenters, several of whom became prominent figures within television, with these new additions including former Formula One driver Tiff Needell, and journalist Jeremy Clarkson, whom Bentley recruited after coming across his work in Performance Car Magazine.

Despite enduring criticism regarding the presentation of the programme, including concerns it encouraged irresponsible driving behaviour, and ignored issues surrounding the impact of driving on the environment, Top Gear was pulling in high viewing figures, regularly becoming BBC2's most viewed programme after 1988 with an average of five million viewers. Part of this increased popularity was attributed to the involvement of Clarkson, as his style of presentation and reviewing of cars proved to be well-received with viewers - in a review of the original Vauxhall Vectra, Clarkson was bluntly honest about his opinion of the car when he declared that "I know it's the replacement for the Cavalier. I know. But I'm telling you it's just a box on wheels."

In 1991, Ross and Woollard left the programme after its 25th series. While Bentley took over as editor for the 26th series, the 1990s saw a host of new faces taking part to replace others, including car dealer Quentin Willson, children's television presenter Steve Johnson, Steve Berry, racing driver Vicki Butler-Henderson, and journalist James May. Additional formats were added including a series of car awards for the best car considered by the presenting team. In addition, the programme also received a number of additional spin-offs such as The Car's the Star and Top Gear Motorsport, and further specials. After Top Gear's success in the late 1980s and early 1990s, a number of competing programmes were introduced, including Channel 4's driven, Central's Pulling Power, Granada's The Motor Show on ITV at first shown only in its local area later part networked in the Granada owned regions, laterVroom Vroom for Sky and BBC World's India's Wheels.

From 1994, the show also spawned a monthly magazine. This included a customer satisfaction survey which was first highlighted on the show and then published in detail in the magazine. Cars of two and three years old were rated by their customers on a ratio of 1 to 5 for factors including performance, fuel economy, build quality, reliability and dealer service. The Toyota Corolla was the winner of the first four surveys (1994 to 1997), followed by the Subaru Impreza in 1998 and 1999 and the Subaru Legacy in 2000 and 2001. The Vauxhall Frontera was judged to be the least satisfying car to own in the original 1994 survey, followed a year later by the Ford Escort, in 1996 and 1997 by the Lada Samara, the Vauxhall Vectra in 1998, Ford Galaxy in 1999 and Vauxhall Sintra in 2000 and 2001. Cars from the likes of Honda, Mazda, Skoda and Subaru also enjoyed consistently good performances in the survey. In April 1998, Skoda was rated as the most satisfying brand of car to own - which played a big part in shaking off its earlier reputation of producing sub-standard cars. The likes of Alfa Romeo, Fiat, Peugeot, Rover and Vauxhall often ranked low in these surveys, with reliability and dealer service being particularly criticised. Mercedes-Benz and Volkswagen were also highlighted at times for failing to match their traditionally high standards of build quality and reliability.

=== Demise and aftermath ===
By 1999, following the departure of Clarkson, the peak audience figures of Top Gear, while still favourable, began to decline, affected further by additional members of the presenting team leaving the programme - a notable departure was of Brendan Coogan, who was forced to resign after being convicted of drink-driving in July. Presenting duties were mainly handled by Willson and Kate Humble, before the final series was fronted by Jason Barlow, following his work on Channel 4's Driven. Despite remaining a popular programme on BBC Two, with its final series run continuously between September 2000 to October 2001, the BBC determined that Top Gear deserved no further series and decided to rest the programme. It was to be replaced by two new programmes aimed at motorists, Panic Mechanic and Top Gear: Car Jack.

Following the cancellation of Top Gear, most of the production staff and several of the programme's presenters decided to move over to Channel 5, as part of a deal to create a new motoring programme. Under its format, aimed as a fresh take on Top Gear's own, the programme would feature its own car reviews, consumer advice, and other examination of motoring subject, with Tiff Needell, Quentin Willson and Vicki Butler-Henderson working as its presenters, with Jon Bentley working as producer. The programme was launched in April 2002 under the title of Fifth Gear, as the BBC would not relinquish the rights to the name of Top Gear for legal reasons.

== Spin-offs ==
Top Gear was a title sponsor of the 1987 and 1988 Formula One "Winter Series", the 1990 and 1991 Historic Rally Championships and the 1992 and 1993 British Rally Championships. Due to the success of the main show, other motoring shows on the BBC also carried the Top Gear name including coverage of the British Motor Show, a show dedicated to motorsport, presented by Tiff Needell, Top Gear Motorsport and the Lombard RAC Rally highlights show, presented by William Woollard, Sue Baker and Tony Mason, Top Gear Rally Report. Quentin Willson presented the classic car show The Car's the Star which told the story of famous classic cars, running for six series between 1994 and 1999.

== Presenter line-up ==
- Angela Rippon (1977–79)
- Tom Coyne (1977)
- Barrie Gill (1978–79)
- Noel Edmonds (1979–80)
- Frank Page (1980–88)
- Sue Baker (1980–91)
- Tom Boswell (1981–90)
- William Woollard (1981–91)
- Chris Goffey (1981–97)
- Tony Mason (1986–2000)
- Tiff Needell (1987–2001)
- Jon Bentley (1988, 1995–97)
- Jeremy Clarkson (1988–98)
- Nicky Fox (1991–92)
- Steve Johnson (1992)
- Quentin Willson (1991–2001)
- Michele Newman (1993–98)
- Steve Berry (1993–99)
- Russell Bulgin (1994)
- Vicki Butler-Henderson (1994–2001)
- Andy Wilman (1994–2001)
- Julia Bradbury (1998–99)
- Brendan Coogan (1999)
- James May (1999)
- Kate Humble (1999–2000)
- Jason Barlow (2000–01)
- Adrian Simpson (2000–01)

== Theme music ==
The show's opening theme music from the very first programme in 1977 was The Allman Brothers Band instrumental "Jessica" from the album Brothers and Sisters (1973), although remixed versions were used from 1999. For much of the series' lifespan, Elton John's instrumental "Out of the Blue" from the album Blue Moves (1976) played over the closing credits.

The opening and closing titles music were suggested to executive producer Derek Smith by his son Graham, who had the two albums at home. He played the tracks to his father and was asked to write down the details, so they could be sourced from the record library in the BBC.

== Merchandising ==
In September 1993, the BBC launched a magazine entitled Top Gear Magazine, which featured articles and columns from the presenters and additional contributors, as well as a customer satisfaction survey from 1994. The magazine became a commercial hit across the United Kingdom in the wake of its launch. In addition, the broadcaster also launched CD albums and a selection of VHS sets consisting of unique specials, presented by the team between 1994 and 2000.

=== CD releases ===
- (1994) Top Gear – 36 track rock compilation on two discs (Epic Records).
- (1995) Top Gear 2 – 36 track rock compilation on two discs (Columbia Records).
- (1995) Top Gear Classics: Turbo Classics – compilation of 17 classical tracks on a single disc (PolyGram TV).
- (1995) Top Gear Classics: Baroque Busters – compilation of 18 classical baroque tracks on a single disc (Deutsche Grammophon).
- (1995) Top Gear Classics: Open Top Opera – compilation of 18 tracks from classic operas on a single disc (Deutsche Grammophon).
- (1995) Top Gear Classics: Motoring Moods – compilation of 12 classical tracks on a single disc (Deutsche Grammophon/PolyGram TV).
- (1996) Top Gear 3: Rock Ballads – 38 tracks of rock and pop on two discs (Columbia Records).
- (1996) Top Gear: On the Road Again – 36 track pop compilation on two discs (EMI TV).
- (1998) Top Gear Anthems – 38 tracks of rock and electronic music on two discs (Virgin Records).

=== VHS releases ===
- (1994) Top Gear: Super Cars – Presented by Jeremy Clarkson and Tiff Needell (63 min).
- (1994) Top Gear: Classic Cars – Presented by Quentin Willson (65 min).
- (1997) Top Gear: Fast & Furious – Presented by Jeremy Clarkson and Tiff Needell (77 min).
- (1998) Classic Cars: Aston Martin – Presented by Jeremy Clarkson (45 min).
- (1998) Classic Cars: Porsche – Presented by Tiff Needell (45 min).
- (1998) Classic Cars: Ferrari – Presented by Chris Goffey (45 min).
- (1998) Classic Cars: Jaguar – Presented by Quentin Willson (45 min).
- (1999) Top Gear: 21 Years of Top Gear – (preproduction/promotional release of TV special) Presented by Kate Humble (29 min).
- (2000) Top Gear: Fast and Furious 2 – Presented by Tiff Needell (with foreword by Clarkson, Willson and Butler-Henderson) (72 min).

== Relaunch ==
After the first series of Fifth Gear was completed, the BBC decided to relaunch Top Gear, but in a new studio based format as opposed to the magazine format used until the cancellation. The idea came from producer Andy Wilman and Jeremy Clarkson, who presented the relaunched show with Richard Hammond and Jason Dawe. James May replaced Dawe from the second series onwards of the revamped format. The pre-cancellation show is referred to as "Old Top Gear", when mentioned on the new show due to the differences in style.

The revamped Top Gear later saw Chris Evans, Matt LeBlanc, Eddie Jordan, Sabine Schmitz, Chris Harris, Rory Reid, Paddy McGuinness and Freddie Flintoff as presenters, running until 2022.
