= Top Gear Motorsport =

- Top Gear Motorsport Title Logo
- Presented by: Tiff Needell; Penny Mallory; Tony Mason; Steve Berry; Mark James; Bob Constanduros
- Country of origin: United Kingdom
- No. of episodes: 94

Production
- Running time: 30 minutes

Original release
- Network: BBC Two
- Release: 10 November 1994 – 16 November 1998

Related
- Top Gear (1977)

Top Gear Motorsport is a British television programme, covering various forms of motor racing, broadcast on BBC Two from 1994 to 1998. It was a spin-off programme from the popular motoring series Top Gear. The programme was presented by former Formula One driver and Top Gear presenter Tiff Needell. Other presenters were Penny Mallory, Tony Mason, Steve Berry, Mark James and Bob Constanduros.

The series covered a wide variety of motor racing categories from across the world, including the World Rally Championship, the British Rally Championship, British Formula Three, Formula Renault, and Formula Vauxhall Junior, British Superbikes, and Eurocars, German Touring Car Championship, European Truck Racing Championship.
