= Penny Mallory =

British Rally Championship driver

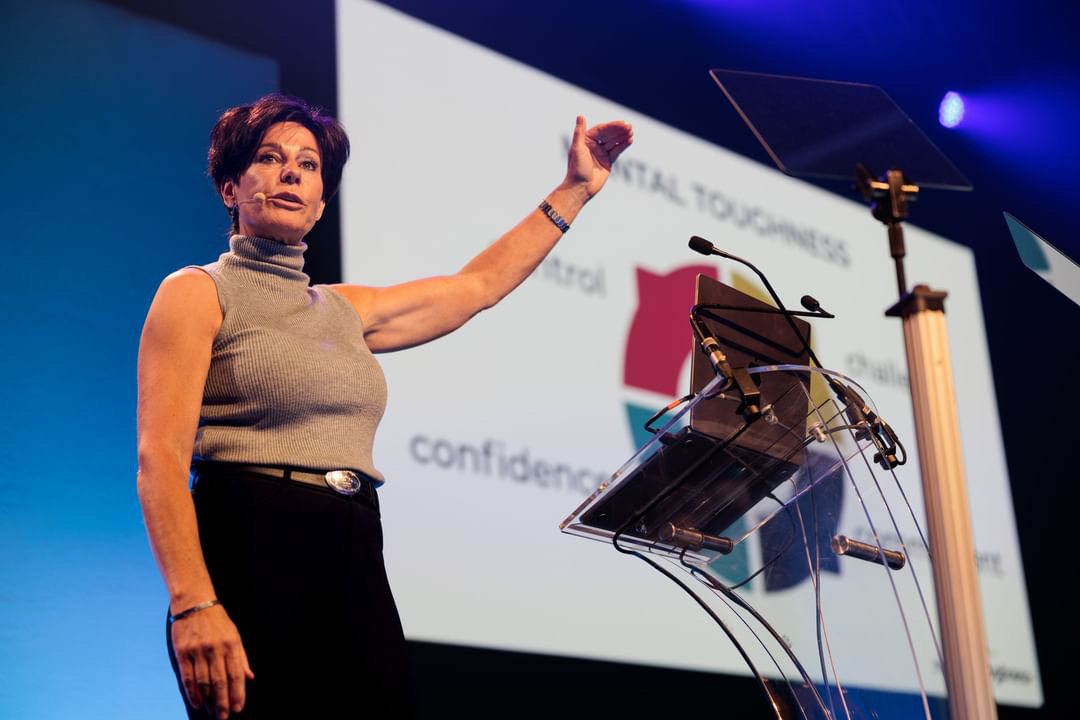
Penny Mallory as a keynote speaker for The Morson Group in 2024.

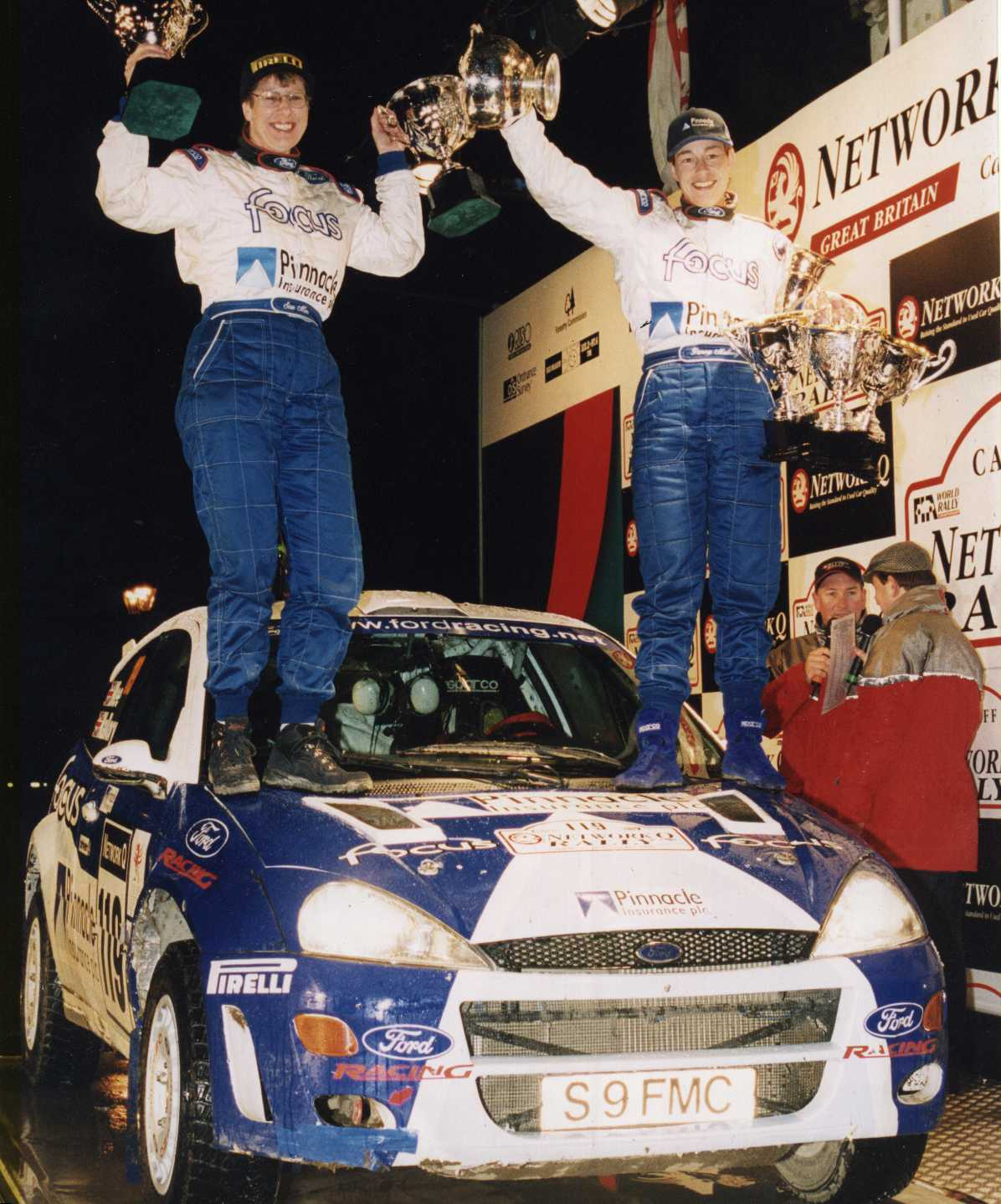
Penny Mallory (left) with her co-driver standing on their winning 2000 Ford Focus WRC rally car at Rally GB

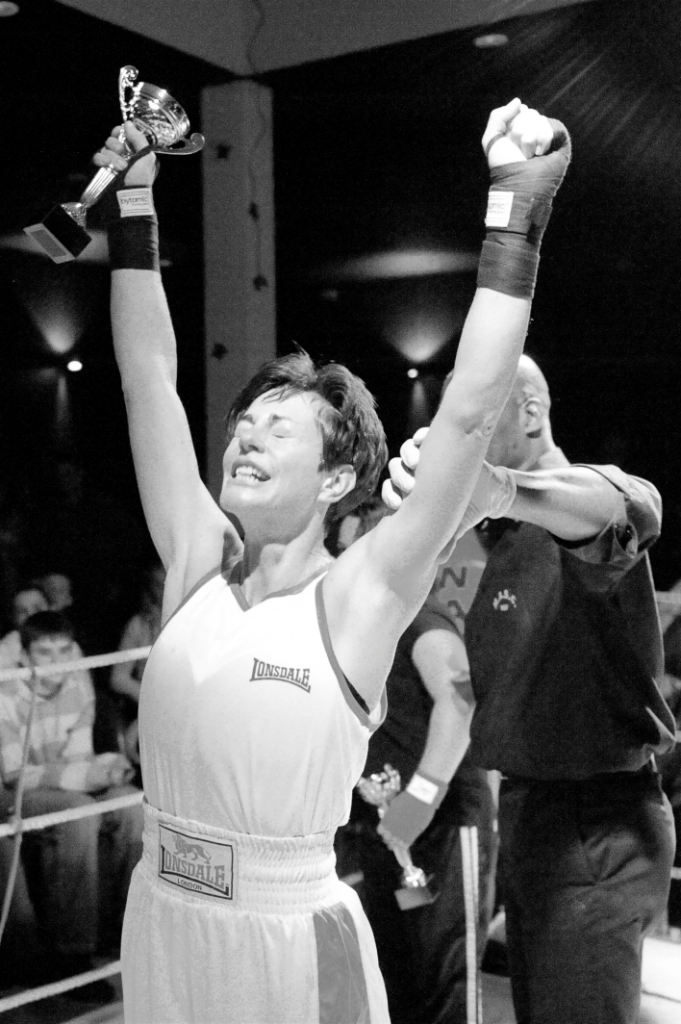
Penny Mallory as a boxer in 2008

Penny Mallory is an English keynote speaker, and TedX speaker, on mental toughness, performance coach and a former British Rally Championship driver.

She is a leading authority on mental toughness. She became the first woman to drive a World Rally Car (WRC)-specification in the otherwise male-dominated FIA World Rally Championship. Penny has been a boxer, mountaineer, marathon runner and triathlete and is training to row the Atlantic Ocean in 2026.

She also worked as a precision stunt driver, playing both 'Nicole' and 'Papa', for two Renault Clio commercials.

Mallory is also a former television presenter; she co-hosted Channel 4's motoring programme Driven alongside Mike Brewer and Jason Plato, and Accident Black Spot. She also co-hosted with Jason Dawe on the Used Car Roadshow, which was originally broadcast on Men & Motors and later was occasionally repeated on ITV4. She presented Classic Car Club for Discovery with Edd China, Tony Mason and Alex Riley. She also previously co-presented Channel 4's programme on the World Rally Championship (WRC) series, until it was taken over by ITV in 2004.

== Early life ==
Mallory grew up in Kent, England. In interviews, she has spoken about experiencing a difficult childhood marked by family instability and periods of social and emotional hardship. She has stated that these early experiences contributed to behavioural difficulties at school and a sense of disengagement during her early teenage years.

As a teenager, Mallory left home and spent time living in hostels in London. During this period, she has described experiencing homelessness and a lack of stable support. In later reflections, Mallory has credited this time as a formative influence on her subsequent interest in resilience, motivation and human performance.

== Publications ==
Books

- Penny Mallory, Hodder & Stoughton ltd: 365 Ways to Build Your Mental Toughness, a day-by-day guide to living a happier and more successful life. ISBN 978-1-529-39764-2
- Mallory, Penny; Loveridge, Guy (12 February 2010). Take Control of your life: an extraordinary guide to achieving transformation and success in your best years. Chipping Norton, Oxfordshire: Take Control Publishing. ISBN 978-0956484109.
- Mallory, Penny (2018). World Class Thinking, World Class Behaviour: adopt a winning mindset to get what you want. CreateSpace Independent Publishing Platform. ISBN 978-0956484178.

DVDs

- Woods, Pete; Mallory, Penny (2002). Lewis, Dave (ed.). Colin McRae: pedal to the metal (DVD, 104 minutes, 4:3). ILC, for Chrysalis Television Ltd. OCLC 308717829Summary: The story of a real British driving legend, Colin McRae, with riveting action, a peek into the McRae lifestyle, all the big names and all told by the man himself.
- Mallory, Penny (2004). The Conquest of Everest: revisited 1953-2003 (DVD, 54 minutes, 4:3). Pegasus. OCLC 156366814Summary: What drove the men who risked their lives to conquer the world's highest mountain for Britain? Did George Leigh Mallory reach the summit 29 years before Hillary and Sherpa Tenzing Norgay? The story of Mallory's adventure and death is revisited with authentic footage.
- Green, Warren; Mallory, Penny; Allum, Daniel (2013). Classic Car Club (3x DVD, 230 minutes). Etten-Leur: TDM, for Discovery Communications Europe. OCLC 870283990.
