= Timeline of motorsport on UK television =

This is a timeline of the history of motorsport on television in the United Kingdom.

== 1950s, 1960s and 1970s ==
- 1950
  - The BBC broadcasts commentary on a Formula 1 race for the first time, airing on radio with highlights on TV.
- 1965
  - 2 January – The first edition of World of Sport is broadcast. Motorsport in various different forms is a regular feature on the programme throughout its run.
- 1978
  - 7 May – The first edition of Grand Prix is broadcast when the BBC provides highlights of the 1978 Monaco Grand Prix. The new programme allows the BBC to provide coverage of every Formula One race for the first time. Previously, Formula One coverage had been non-comprehensive and had been shown by both the BBC and ITV.

== 1980s ==
- 1981
  - 17 May – Sunday Grandstand launches and the new programme regularly features live coverage of Formula One.
- 1982
  - No events.
- 1983
  - No events.
- 1984
  - 24 November – The first edition of Rally Report is broadcast on BBC2 to provide coverage of that year’s Lombard RAC Rally.
- 1985
  - 28 September – The final edition of World of Sport is broadcast. Motorsport had been a regular part of the programme and consequently, ITV’s coverage of motorsport is reduced.
- 1986
  - 26 October – BBC2 stays on air into the early hours to bring viewers live coverage of Nigel Mansell’s attempt to win the 1986 Formula One World Championship
- 1987
  - No events.
- 1988
  - The BBC begins showing highlights of every race of the British Touring Car Championship and continues to do so until 2001.
- 1989
  - The launch of Eurosport sees UK audiences being able to watch live coverage of Formula One qualifying for the first time.

== 1990s ==
- 1990
  - No events.
- 1991
  - No events.
- 1992
  - 8 November – BBC2 stays up all night to provide live coverage of the final race of the 1992 Formula One World Championship.
- 1993
  - 27 March – To cash in on Nigel Mansell's popularity, ITV begins to broadcast highlights of the 1993 PPG Indy Car World Series, showing coverage a week after the races had taken place, however the Indianapolis 500 is retained by Sky Sports. It did so until Mansell's departure at the end of the 1994 PPG Indy Car World Series.
- 1994
  - No events,
- 1995
  - No events,
- 1996
  - For what is the BBC's final year of its contract to show Formula One, the Corporation shows full live coverage of the qualifying round for each Formula One race. In previous years, the BBC had only shown live coverage of qualification for the British Grand Prix with qualifying for all other rounds restricted to a brief report.
  - 13 October – The final edition of Grand Prix is broadcast when BBC Sport shows live coverage of the final race of the 1996 Formula One World Championship, the 1996 Japanese Grand Prix. Also ending on this day is Eurosport’s coverage of the event. Eurosport had shown full race weekend coverage of the event and had been the only place to see the practice and qualifying sessions prior to the 1996 Formula One World Championship.
- 1997
  - March – ITV takes over as the broadcaster of Formula One motor racing. It shows full coverage of qualifying as well as the race itself, something that the previous rights holder, the BBC, generally did not do until 1996.
  - 31 May – The first edition of International Motor Racing is shown on ITV, broadcasting highlights from Formula One's feeder series Formula 3000 and certain support championships that run on Formula One weekends, such as the Porsche Supercup.
  - To fill the gap left by the loss of Formula One to ITV, the BBC begins showing some live coverage of the British Touring Car Championship.
- 1998
  - 20 December – The final edition of Rally Report, now called Top Gear Rally Report, is broadcast on BBC Two.
- 1999
  - No events,

== 2000s ==
- 2000
  - January – Channel 4 begins to broadcast highlights of Iceland's Formula Off Road.
  - Channel 5 begins showing live coverage of MotoGP. It shows the event for the next three seasons.
- 2001
  - March – Motorsports channel Motors TV launches in the UK.
  - 30 September – Murray Walker commentates on his final televised Formula One race at the 2001 United States Grand Prix.
  - The BBC’s coverage of the World Rally Championship ends. It had shown highlights of each round, along with live coverage of Rally GB, for many years.
- 2002
  - 19 January – Channel 4 begins airing highlights from the World Rally Championship, after securing the rights from the BBC.
  - 1 March – F1 Digital+ launches. It offers enhanced multi-screen coverage of Formula One on a pay-per-view basis.
  - ITV takes over from the BBC as broadcaster of the British Touring Car Championship. ITV shows live coverage as opposed to only highlights when the BBC had the contract.
  - 12 December – After just one season, F1 Digital+ closes.
- 2003
  - The BBC wins the rights to the MotoGP World Championship. Previously, the corporation had only covered the British round of the championship.
  - 9 November – Channel 4's coverage of the World Rally Championship ends after two years with live coverage of the final stage from Wales Rally GB.
  - 27 December – The final edition of International Motor Sport, previously known as International Motor Racing until 2003, is shown on ITV.
- 2004
  - 25 January – ITV takes over coverage of the World Rally Championship from Channel 4. The channel airs highlights of each round of the championship in a single 60 minute programme, usually on Sunday afternoons, in contrast to that Channel 4 had aired highlights on all three days of each round.
  - 14 March – The first edition of Speed Sunday is broadcast on ITV, a new Sunday afternoon motorsport magazine programme, commissioned as part of ITV's expanding portfolio of motorsport rights.
  - 12–13 June – ITV airs coverage of the Le Mans 24 Hours, the first year the race has been covered on free-to-air television in three years.
  - 24 October – The final edition of Speed Sunday is broadcast on ITV. The programme is axed after just a single series due to low ratings.
- 2005
  - No events.
- 2006
  - 22 January – ITV takes the official highlights programme for the World Rally Championship for the 2006 season, rather than producing its own programme as it had done so previously, this was seen by many as a cost-cutting measure.
  - 17–18 June – Motors TV broadcasts the Le Mans 24 Hours race in its entirety. It also shows the 2007 race.
- 2007
  - 2 December – ITV's coverage of the World Rally Championship ends after four years. For the 2007 season, the highlights programme had been shown on ITV4 instead of the main channel.
- 2008
  - 27 January – UKTV takes over the rights to the World Rally Championship, with the highlights programme airing on Dave.
  - March – ITV announces that they have enacted a clause within their contract enabling them to leave Formula One coverage after the 2008 season. It is believed this was done for commercial reasons and to allow more money to be spent on securing coverage of the UEFA Champions League.
  - Eurosport shows the British Superbike Championship for the first time, and now holds the rights to the event until 2027.
  - 14–15 June – Coverage of Le Mans moves to Eurosport.
  - 2 November – ITV broadcasts its final Formula One race, the 2008 Brazilian Grand Prix, in which British driver Lewis Hamilton wins his first drivers title on the final lap of the race.
- 2009
  - March – Channel 4 launches a new motorsport magazine programme Mobil 1 The Grid.
  - 29 March – Formula One returns to the BBC after the Corporation obtains live exclusive rights to the event following ITV’s decision to end its coverage.

== 2010s ==
- 2010
  - No events.
- 2011
  - 12 January – ESPN signs a deal to show exclusive coverage of the World Rally Championship. ESPN will screen 30-minute nightly bulletins at the end of every WRC day, with on-event coverage bookended by an hour-long preview and review show.
  - 29 January – Premier Sports begins broadcasting all 38 weeks of racing from the NASCAR Sprint Cup Series. In a one-off deal, Kimi Räikkönen's Camping World Truck Series debut was broadcast live and free-to-view.
  - 29 July – It is announced that the broadcasting rights of Formula One are to be shared between the BBC and Sky Sports from 2012 until 2018. Sky Sports will broadcast every race live, whilst the BBC will be able to broadcast up to half of the races in each season live, including both the British Grand Prix and the final race of the season, with all remaining races being broadcast in extensive highlights shows.
- 2012
  - 9 March – Sky Sports F1 launches following Sky’s purchase of the rights to show live coverage of every race of the Formula One season.
- 2013
  - Sky Sports increases its coverage of motorsport when it starts to broadcast FIA Formula 2 Championship (previously known as GP2) and FIA Formula 3 Championship on Sky Sports F1.
- 2014
  - January – BT Sport acquires the rights to broadcast the World Rally Championship for the 2014 season.
  - BT Sport begins showing MotoGP. Coverage is more extensive than that shown by the BBC as it includes free practices and qualifying as well as full coverage of Moto2 and Moto3.
  - 17 March – ITV becomes the broadcaster of the new Formula E series, showing the 10 events on ITV4.
  - 9 October – Motors TV launches on Freeview.
- 2015
  - 21 December – Budget cuts result in the BBC deciding to end its coverage of Formula One three years early. The rights transfer to Channel 4 for the remainder of the BBC's contract.
  - BT Sport shows its first live speedway when it replaces Eurosport as broadcaster of the Speedway World Championship
- 2016
  - 18 March – Channel 4 shows Formula One motor racing for the first time. This comes about following the BBC's decision to end its deal with Formula One early. For the next three seasons, Channel 4 shows roughly half of the races live. The coverage is broadcast under the title of Channel 4 F1 and broadcasts live coverage of ten selected races live without advertisements and every race (even live) is shown as highlights, including the British Grand Prix and final race weekend.
  - 4 September – Channel 5 acquires the UK broadcasting rights to Formula E from the 2016–17 season following Formula E's termination of its contract with ITV. It shows all races from round three and then shows all of the following season.
- 2017
  - 1 March – Motors TV relaunches itself as Motorsport.tv. The change also sees the channel start to broadcast in high definition.
  - Coverage of MotoGP returns to Channel 5 although this time the coverage of restricted to highlights only. Channel 5 covers the event for the next two years.
  - Front Runner shows the 2017 British GT Championship.
- 2018
  - Premier Sports, and its sister channel Freesports, broadcast live and also highlights of the speedway leagues Sweden's Elitserien and the Polish PGE Ekstraliga.
  - 30 September – After more than 17 years on air, Motorsport.tv, previously known as Motors TV, closes its linear channel, switching to online-streaming only.
  - 15 December – The BBC begins its coverage of Formula E and shows most of the races on the BBC Red Button.
- 2019
  - 17 March – Sky Sports becomes the exclusive broadcaster of all Formula One races, apart from the British Grand Prix which continues to be shown on Channel 4. Channel 4 also broadcasts highlights of all the other races.
  - 2019 also sees the return to Sky Sports of the IndyCar Series after six seasons with BT Sport..

== 2020s ==
- 2020
  - March – Eurosport replaces BT Sport as rights holder to British Speedway.
- 2021
  - April – Sky Sports begins showing Extreme E motor racing.
  - 16 May – Live broadcasts of MotoGP return to terrestrial television with live coverage of 2021 French motorcycle Grand Prix on ITV4 and the 2021 British motorcycle Grand Prix on ITV.
  - 12 December – Coverage of the final race of the 2021 Formula One season, the Abu Dhabi Grand Prix, is shown free-to-air after Sky Sports agrees a one-off deal to simulcast the race live on Channel 4, due to Lewis Hamilton and Max Verstappen starting the race level on points in the championship.
- 2022
  - 29 January – Channel 4 broadcasts Formula E for the first time with round 2 of the 2022 Diriyah ePrix. Channel 4 had signed a multi-year broadcast agreement just 8 days before this event. The opening round had been streamed live on YouTube.
