= Driven (TV series) =

- The Driven logo
- Presented by: Mike Brewer; Penny Mallory; Jason Plato; Jason Barlow; James May
- Country of origin: United Kingdom
- Original language: English
- No. of episodes: 80

Production
- Producer: IWC Media
- Running time: ~24 minutes

Original release
- Network: Channel 4
- Release: 13 October 1998 – 15 December 2002

Driven is a motoring television programme launched by Channel 4 in 1998 as a rival to the successful and long-running BBC series Top Gear. It last aired new episodes in 2002.

== History ==
The style was similar to its rival, but with additional features such as the "Driven 100", a road test of three cars in the same class, where each car would be given marks for qualities such as practicality, desirability and cost of ownership. The car with the highest total score would be the winner. The programme launched with the concept that the presenters should interact with each other rather than present items on their own, as was then the case on Top Gear. The first series also featured a "headquarters", a racing team track, set on a former USAF base (Wethersfield, Essex) at which cars were put through their paces. These concepts resurfaced in the reborn Top Gear soon after.

Originally presented by Mike Brewer, James May and Jason Barlow, subsequent series also featured the rally driver Penny Mallory and the racing driver Jason Plato. The latter pipped Richard Hammond to the role according to the pair's conversation on motoring podcast Fuelling Around.

During the show's run, both May and Barlow left the show to join the old format of BBC's Top Gear.

Following the creation of Fifth Gear and the revival of Top Gear, Driven was cancelled by Channel 4 in 2002. Plato went on to present Fifth Gear, May joined the newly relaunched Top Gear, Brewer presented ITV's Pulling Power and Mallory could be seen on ITV4's Used Car Roadshow.

== Reception ==
The Daily Mirror's Maeve Quigley praised the series, writing, "The show is fast and furious yet manages to get its message across without appearing as laddish as its nearest BBC rival." The Liverpool Echo said, "The demise of the BBC's longrunning motor magazine Top Gear left car enthusiasts with a dearth of quality programming to satisfy their interest. But this sleek new model is being driven to succeed as more than just an adequate replacement for its vintage predecessor."

== See also ==
- Channel 4 programming
