= The Car's the Star =

British television series

- Presented by: Quentin Willson
- Theme music composer: David Lowe
- Country of origin: United Kingdom
- Original language: English
- No. of series: 6
- No. of episodes: 33

Production
- Executive producer: Dennis Adams
- Producer: Jon Bentley
- Production location: Pebble Mill Studios
- Running time: 20 minutes

Original release
- Network: BBC Two
- Release: 25 September 1994 – 11 October 1999

The Car's the Star is a British classic car television series hosted by Quentin Willson, and was a spin-off from the original version of Top Gear. In each episode, a biography of the car described by Willson was interspersed by interviews with the cars' owners. The show would sometimes show footage of owners club events and race days.

== Series overview ==
Series overview
Series	Episodes	Originally released	
Series	Episodes	First released	Last released
1	6	25 September 1994	30 October 1994
2	6	17 February 1995	23 May 1995
3	3	14 September 1996	16 November 1996
4	6	13 October 1997	17 November 1997
5	6	13 October 1998	27 December 1998
6	6	6 September 1999	11 October 1999

== Episode list ==
=== Series 1 (1994) ===
No. overall	No. in series	Star Car	Original release date	Prod. code
1	1	Ford Zephyr	25 September 1994	NBMW291B
2	2	Jensen Interceptor	2 October 1994	NBMW292W
3	3	Austin Allegro	9 October 1994	NBMW294J
4	4	Cadillac Series 62	16 October 1994	NBMW293P
5	5	Citroën DS	23 October 1994	NBMW295D
6	6	Ford Mustang	30 October 1994	NBMW296X

=== Series 2 (1995) ===
No. overall	No. in series	Star Car	Original release date	Prod. code
7	1	Land Rover	17 February 1995	NBMW297R
8	2	Triumph Herald	24 February 1995	NBMW299E
9	3	Austin-Healey	3 March 1995	NBMW274B
10	4	Volkswagen Golf GTI	9 May 1995	NBMW298K
11	5	Fiat 500	16 May 1995	NBMW275W
12	6	Rolls-Royce Silver Cloud	23 May 1995	NBMW300N

=== Series 3 (1996) ===
No. overall	No. in series	Star Car	Original release date	Prod. code
13	1	Reliant Robin	14 September 1996	NBHA033E
14	2	Jaguar Mark 2	9 November 1996	NBHA034Y
15	3	Citroën 2CV	16 November 1996	NBHA035S

=== Series 4 (1997) ===
No. overall	No. in series	Star Car	Original release date	Prod. code
16	1	Jaguar E-Type	13 October 1997	NBHD599L
Featuring George Best, Adam Faith, and Jackie Stewart.
17	2	Austin Mini	20 October 1997	NBHD596E
18	3	Ford Capri	27 October 1997	NBHD595K
19	4	VW Camper Van	3 November 1997	NBHD597Y
20	5	MG MGB	10 November 1997	NBHD600W
21	6	Chevrolet Corvette	17 November 1997	NBHD598S

=== Series 5 (1998) ===
No. overall	No. in series	Star Car	Original release date	Prod. code
22	1	AC Cobra	13 October 1998	NBHG598F
23	2	Hillman Imp	22 November 1998	NBHG593K
24	3	Ford Edsel	6 December 1998	NBHG597L
25	4	Porsche 911	13 December 1998	NBHG596S
26	5	Lotus Seven	20 December 1998	NBHG594E
27	6	Lada Riva	27 December 1998	NBHG595Y

=== Series 6 (1999) ===
No. overall	No. in series	Star Car	Original release date	Prod. code
28	1	Rolls-Royce Silver Shadow	6 September 1999	NBHJ254L
29	2	Volkswagen Beetle	13 September 1999	NBHJ256A
30	3	McLaren F1	20 September 1999	NBHJ255F
31	4	Volvo 200 Series	27 September 1999	NBHJ253S
32	5	Willys Jeep	4 October 1999	NBHJ258N
33	6	DMC DeLorean	11 October 1999	NBHJ257T
