= Public Account =

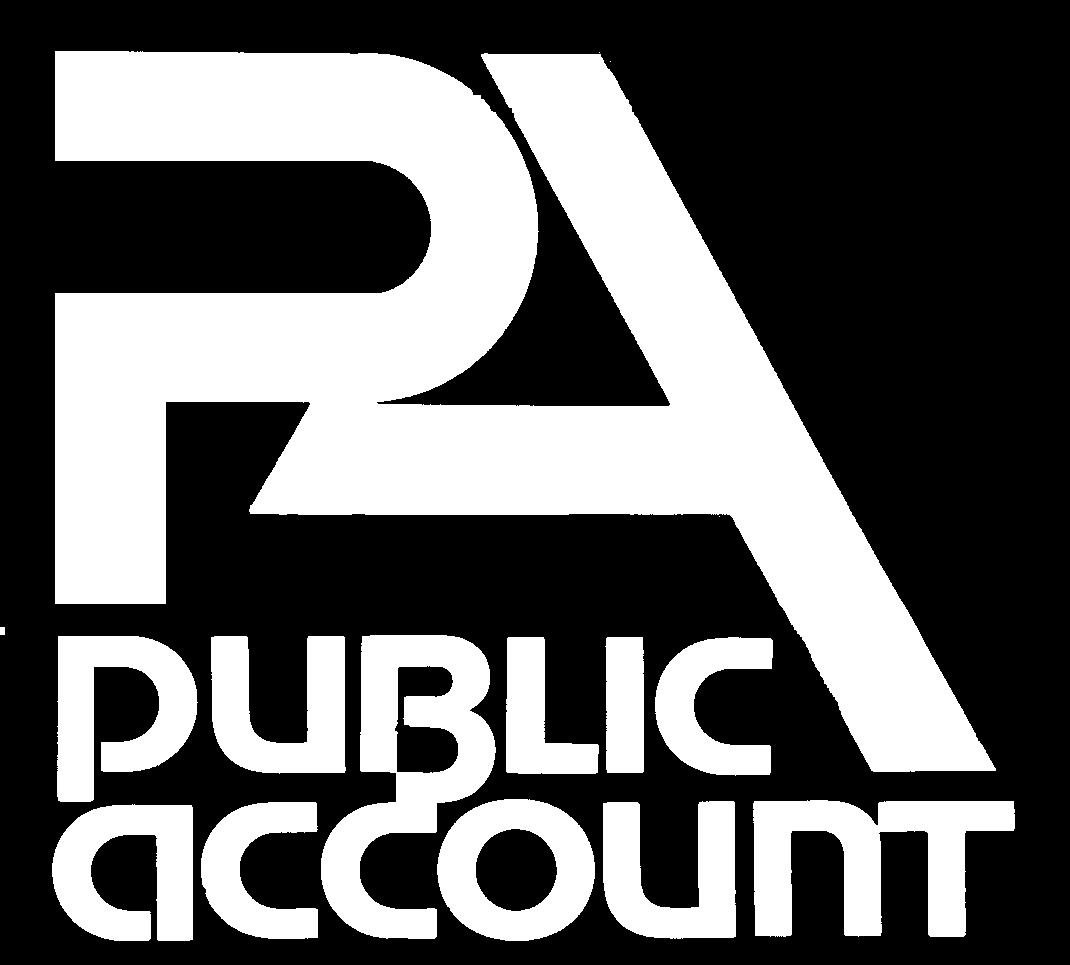

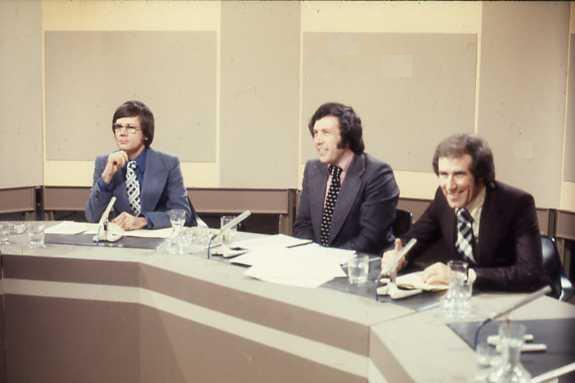
James Cox, Donald MacCormick and Andrew Neil

Public Account is a weekly political programme first transmitted on 6 January 1975 by BBC Television in Scotland. It was the sister programme to BBC Scotland's Current Account which covered general current affairs issues rather than politics.

Public Account was transmitted mainly on BBC1 Scotland on Mondays after 22.45. It was designed to reflect the increased interest in politics in Scotland with the discovery of oil in the North Sea and the rise of the fortunes of the Scottish National Party. It covered politics up to the first Devolution Referendum held by the Callaghan Labour government. The last programme was shown on 3 July 1978.

The programme was presented by Donald MacCormick, James Cox, and Andrew Neil.

Tom Ross was the producer and Matthew Spicer was the editor.
