= Jason Barlow =

Motoring journalist from Northern Ireland

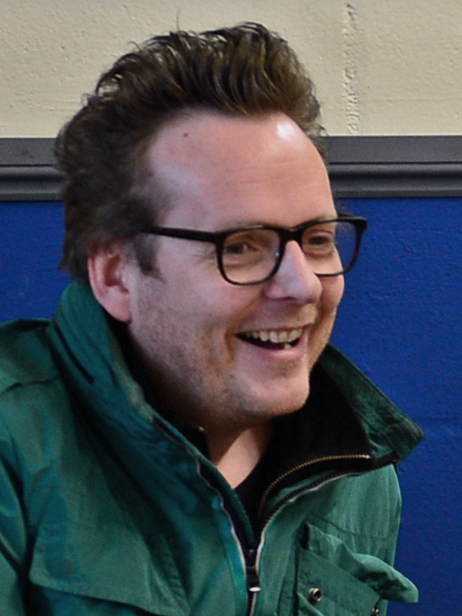
Barlow in 2015

Jason Barlow is a motoring journalist and broadcaster from Northern Ireland.

He began his television career in 1998, when he was approached to present Channel Four's new car programme Driven, with co-presenters Mike Brewer and James May. In 2000, he was personally approached by the then-controller of BBC2 to present Top Gear, and he went on to front 53 editions of the programme prior to its relaunch in 2002, with Jeremy Clarkson. Still under contract to the BBC, he presented BBC2's motoring programme Wrong Car, Right Car from 2002 to 2003.

More recently, he has presented several editions of Channel 4's award-winning Dispatches, a behind-the-scenes documentary for Sky One and Sky Movies on the making of Danny Boyle's 2006 sci-fi thriller Sunshine, interviewed film director David Lynch for Bafta's David Lean lecture in 2007, presented TV's Greatest Cars and Movie's Greatest Cars for Sky One, and fronted The Big New Preview Show for Sky.

Barlow is editor-at-large for BBC Top Gear magazine, a long-standing contributing editor to Britain's GQ magazine and writes regularly for The Sunday Times. His work is widely syndicated around the world. He has also written for The Times, The Guardian, and The Independent, and was nominated for a British Press Award for his Daily Telegraph column in 2003. He has also undertaken consultancy and corporate work for a variety of blue-chip clients including TAG Heuer, Barclay's Bank, Microsoft, Sony, Kaupthing, BMW, Mini, Ferrari, Peugeot, Honda, and Johnnie Walker.

He has a law degree from the University of Manchester, and a postgraduate diploma in journalism studies from the University of Cardiff. He is married to wife Andrea and they live in Essex with their daughter and son Willem.

Barlow won the award for 'Spectacle Wearer of the Year' in 2001.
