= Deals on Wheels =

- Presented by: Mike Brewer (1997-2001); Richard Sutton (1997-2000)
- Country of origin: United Kingdom
- No. of series: 5
- No. of episodes: 10

Original release
- Network: Channel 4 Discovery
- Release: 1997 – 2001

Deals on Wheels is a British television series first shown on UK TV Channel 4 in 1997. It later aired on the Discovery Channel. Fronted by Mike Brewer and Richard Sutton, the programme aimed to teach viewers how to appraise secondhand cars.

The original run of the series was between 1997 and 2001, with five seasons. For season 1, the show was set in a fictional garage. Season 2 was set in a different garage, but for seasons 3 and 4, the show was set in an alley garage, sited off a fictional street. Sutton left the show in 2000, leaving Brewer to continue. The series was cancelled in 2001 to make way for Wheeler Dealers, also with Brewer.

== Controversy ==
In 1999, a producer for Deals on Wheels resigned after admitting that she had faked scenes by getting her friends to pretend to buy and sell vehicles.
