= Beki Adam =

English journalist and activist

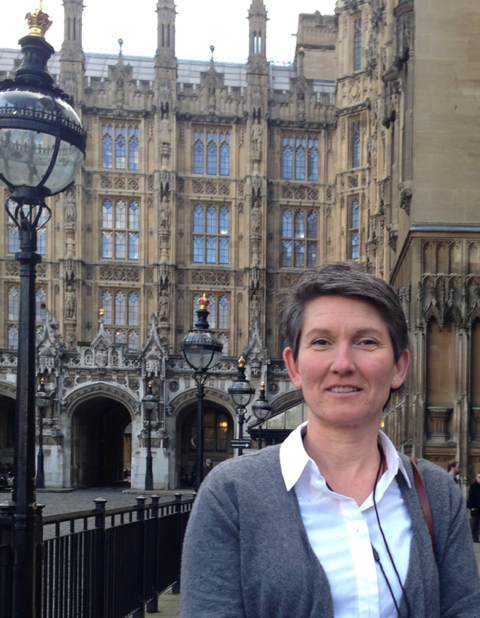
- Adam in 2015, outside the Houses of Parliament.

Personal details
- Born: 25 June 1966 (age 59) Cuckfield, West Sussex, England
- Party: Independent
- Website: http://www.beki.art/

Beki Adam (born 25 June 1966) is an English artist, journalist, broadcaster, farmer, former Buddhist nun and political activist. Her artwork is in private collections from Sussex to New York. She is exhibiting in Brighton, Sussex in May 2024. She was a parliamentary candidate for Mid Sussex in the 2015 general election. In 2018 Beki moved to Woodstock, New York and undertook an interior design project in a house built the same year as the famous festival.

== Journalism ==
=== Television ===
Adam worked as a journalist for print, before later moving into television and presented the BBC television show Top Gear during the 1980s. Speaking of her time presenting the programme, "Back then there were only four television channels and at our height we were getting seven million viewers. I just remember looking down the camera lens and thinking I've got this huge audience and I'm talking about a car. It felt like such a waste.".

=== Print ===
Adam has published several books related to motoring, including Star Cars, Cobra and Ferrari V8.

== Research ==
=== Cannabis ===
Adams spent time investigating the prohibition of cannabis during the 1990s, resulting in her opening a cannabis cafe in Brighton in 1993. The cafe was shut down by police after 57 minutes.

=== Fracking ===
Adam is an opponent of hydraulic fracturing, claiming that the UK has "other alternatives for UK energy supply and security, and, quite clearly, it is time to turn our undivided attention to them.". Her independent research and opposition of fracking led her to become a contributor of evidence during the Infrastructure Bill committee debates in 2015. She campaigned against the Infrastructure Bill in 2015 and suggested that it was the "arguably the most irresponsible piece of legislation ever to be laid before a British Parliament".

=== Electric cars ===
Adam advocates electric car use: "The more people buy electric cars, the more the price will come down. I think today's politics are outdated and so is our view on technology. We need a 21st century vision."

== Spiritual life ==
After working as a journalist Adam travelled to Nepal and upon her return, she visited Samye Ling in Scotland and was ordained as a Buddhist nun. During her seventeen years of ordination, she spent three years in the United States in silent retreat and taught meditation in Mid Sussex. She was featured in a short documentary about her life as a nun titled 'Unusual Choices' filmed in 2009.

== Politics ==
Adam was a candidate in the 2015 British general election for the Mid Sussex constituency. As an independent candidate, she stood 'beyond party politics' without 'vested interests' for the benefit of a 'fair + safe society'. She wished to offer "a viable option for people who have lost faith in the main political parties." were she elected. She has never voted in an election. She cites her previous experience in journalism and as a Buddhist nun as instrumental in leading her into a political career path, campaigning for a "safe and secure" society. During campaigning, Adams spoke of her desire to launch a local bank providing small loans to local traders and small businesses, with her aim in office to bring economic controls back to "support and protect people and place".

== Publications ==
- Star Cars (Osprey Publishing, Oxford, 1987) ISBN 085045803X
- Cobra (Osprey Publishing, Oxford, 1989) ISBN 0850458099
- Ferrari V8 (Osprey Publishing, Oxford, 1990) ISBN 0850458811
