= Merritt engine =

The Merritt engine is a design conceived by Dan Merritt, an engineer at Coventry University. Rather than being entirely new, it is a development of the standard petrol engine. The engine is intended to provide "diesel levels of efficiency through a lean-burn strategy similar to that of direct injection". Merritt proposes that fuel/air mixing is not done in the cylinder, but takes place beforehand in a special chamber designed to promote swirl.

The Merritt technique is also known as MUSIC – for Merritt Unthrottled Spark Ignition Combustion. Brian Knibb, an engineer in Derby, UK, says it is relatively straightforward to modify existing engines to run in this way. “To produce MUSIC engines, a factory would simply need to change the cylinder head fitted to engines, leaving the cylinders and the rest unchanged.”
