= Michele Newman =

British television presenter

Michele Newman (born 8 March 1956) is an English journalist and television producer, previously a television presenter.

== Biography ==
After studying at the University of York from 1977 to 1980, Newman worked at the Liverpool Echo. Between 1981 and 1983, she lived in Italy and France to learn the languages, teaching English as a private tutor. During this time, she spent a year at the College International de Cannes in France. Her French language qualifications include the Alliance française (language and literature), the equivalent of an English A-Level.

On returning to Britain in 1983, Newman began a presenting career on the regional BBC news programme Look East in Norwich, and in 1989 moved to ITV's Central News in Birmingham. Between 1993 and 1998, she was also a presenter on the BBC motoring programme Top Gear. She also presented ITV's motoring magazine Pulling Power and Carlton TV's live weekly political debate It's Your Shout, broadcast from a variety of locations around the Carlton TV region, now known as ITV London.

Newman has also written a motoring column for Women’s Journal and contributed to the London Evening Standard. She had her own TV production company, Newman Productions Ltd, which produced House Race for ITV in 2004. This was dissolved in 2010. After leaving TV she studied Mandarin Chinese at the School of African and Oriental Studies in London and later in Beijing. She is an active volunteer for Beanstalk (formerly known as Volunteer Reading Help) in Birmingham's primary schools. Also she is a photographer.
