= Sue Baker =

British journalist and television presenter (died 2022)

Sue Baker (12 June 1947 – 14 November 2022) was a British journalist and television presenter.

Baker was one of the original presenters of the first iteration of BBC's Top Gear, presenting on the programme from 1980 to 1991. She was the motoring editor for the Observer from 1992 to 1995.

Baker was the vice-president and a former chair of The Guild of Motoring Writers and was awarded the Pemberton Trophy in 2014.

She died on 14 November 2022 due to complications of motor neurone disease (MND). She was 75.
