= Derek Smith (television producer) =

British television producer

Derek Smith (16 April 1927 – 17 March 2015) was a British producer whose body of work extended to more than 100 programmes or series. He was the creator and producer of the original BBC Television series of Top Gear and the adventure survival series Now Get Out of That.

== Early life ==
Smith was born in Kuala Lumpur, Federated Malay States, where his father worked for the Overseas Service. At the age of seven, he was sent to Ryde school on the Isle of Wight as a boarder. During summer holidays, Derek worked on his uncle’s farm. He obtained a degree in agriculture from Reading University, and his first job was as an agricultural adviser for Ranks flour mills in Liverpool. As principal agricultural adviser with the animal feeds division of Quaker Oats, at Southall, west London, he made a series of instructional short films for farmers.

== Early career ==
Smith joined the BBC in Birmingham in 1957, working as an assistant producer on the newly created Farming magazine programme. In the early 1960s he moved on to work on general programming, directing, and producing films and programmes on a range of subjects for the BBC.

== Military subjects ==
One of the first of a number of films he made about the services was Soldier In The Sun, a film looking at the Royal Anglian Regiment in Aden and Yemen (1964). The film has been chosen by the BBC for inclusion in its BBC Four Army Collection. Another was Singapore Twilight (1965) showing the closing tasks of Midland army units. Others include: The Last Outpost, a film about the Trucial Oman Scouts in Arabia (1965); Men Of Action, a Royal Marines team competition (1966); Fly The Helicopter, showing the RAF Search and Rescue at work (1966); They Speak The Language Anyway looking at life at a US Air Force base at Mildenhall in East Anglia. (1967)

Smith produced The Flight Deck Story, the history of the aircraft carrier, filmed on HMS Eagle and on USS Enterprise off the coast of Vietnam. He also produced Mission To Hell, which followed the Bishop of Birmingham Leonard Wilson returning to Singapore to tell his story of war time imprisonment by the Japanese Army. Another military history film Smith made at this time was Jump Jet, the history of the Hawker Harrier, vertical take-off or land aircraft.

== General subjects ==
A film for the series The World About Us, The Lost River Of Gaping Gill showed cavers exploring the route of an underground river in Yorkshire.

In 1971, Smith was in the news when an advertisement for his documentary The Car Makers, which included a look behind the scenes of British Leyland's new Morris Marina car, inadvertently revealed the name and images of the car ahead of its launch.

A series of six films produced by Smith in 1974 was Journey Through Summer, in which actor and writer PJ Kavanagh viewed various parts of Britain through long-distance walks. The series received a positive review in the Daily Express, featuring Smith's production.

Smith also produced four films Archie Hill Comes Home, about the writer's return to the Black Country (1974). Four In Hand was a film Smith produced with Prince Philip, Duke of Edinburgh, discussing and demonstrating Carriage Driving Events (1974).

A studio based programme devised by Smith was Major Minor, a piano competition for 10-13 year-olds. A BBC Midlands programme, repeated on the network, it ran for three seasons and was presented by musician and composer Steve Race.

In 1975, Smith produced the film Return To Dunkirk, about the men who escaped from a massacre at Esquelbecq. Just A Year followed three of the survivors of the Birmingham pub bombs in November 1974 which killed 21 people.

In March 1977, Smith created and produced a new series for BBC Midlands, Top Gear. A magazine style programme, it ran for nine monthly episodes shown only in the Midlands region. The following year, it became a network show, broadcast nationally on BBC 2. Smith continued as series producer. A spin-off programme Smith also produced annually, was Rally Report a nightly report, including film, of the Lombard RAC Rally, also presented by William Woollard.

Smith produced several series of Kick Start, a competition based on the sport of motorcycle trials riding. An original programme devised by Smith was Now Get Out of That, an outdoor competition between two teams testing their survival abilities along with problem solving mental tests.
