= Frank Page (motoring journalist) =

Motoring journalist

- Born: 1930
- Died: August 9, 2014 (aged 83–84); Herefordshire
- Occupation: Journalist

Frank Page (1930 - 9 August 2014) was a motoring journalist. He began his career in 1952 at Garage And Motor Agent magazine, and went on to work for many top motoring publications, reporting on cars, motorbikes and related safety issues.

He wrote for The Daily Telegraph, and was the motoring editor at The Mail on Sunday between 1982 and 1985.

He was a contributor and presenter on the BBC's Top Gear programme between 1980 and 1989.

A former chairman of the Guild of Motoring Writers (1983–1984), his interests included theatre, motorsport, jazz and golf, the latter of which he played with Denis Thatcher.

Frank Page died on Saturday 9 August 2014 from sepsis, in Herefordshire England, aged 84. He was married for 44 years, and had three children.
