= Michael Collie =

British television and radio presenter

- Born: Michael Collie
- Occupations: Journalist, newsreader and television presenter
- Years active: 1986 – present
- Employer: BBC News

Michael Collie is a British television and radio presenter who appears on BBC News. He is also a former presenter of the weekly politics programme, the Politics Show, in addition to his work presenting BBC Midlands Today, produced by the BBC's West Midlands region.

== BBC ==
Michael Collie began his full-time broadcasting career on BBC Radio WM as the early morning newsreader. Nationally has reported for "Today" and presented "You and Yours" on BBC Radio 4, for which he worked for 5 years, winning the Jet Media Excellence Award for Radio for an investigation into car mileage clocking. He has also worked as a newsreader on BBC Radio 2.

On television he worked on "Countryfile" as a presenter/reporter for 6 years, also presenting on "Top Gear" for two series. He was the presenter of BBC2's "Paddles Up" canoeing series, and also appeared as a model on BBC1's "The Clothes Show". Michael Collie's voice has appeared across the BBC1 network, including on "Telly Addicts" and "The Day on BBC One".

=== Midlands Today ===
Michael joined the team at Midlands Today and BBC Birmingham in 1995 and presents across the output.

=== The Politics Show ===
Michael is a former presenter of the Politics Show in the West Midlands, and prior to that "The Midlands at Westminster".

== Non-broadcast work ==
Away from broadcasting, Michael has scripted and hosted concerts for the Philharmonia Orchestra in London and the City of Birmingham Symphony Orchestra in Birmingham. He has also worked with other music ensembles, including Birmingham Symphonic Winds. Previously he worked as a motorcycle courier, a painter and decorator and in a steel rolling-mill in Sheffield.

He has 4 children.

== Personal life ==
Michael Collie went to school in Sheffield in South Yorkshire. He lives near Cheltenham, Gloucestershire. He studied Drama and Theatre Arts at the University of Birmingham in the early 1980s. He now has 4 children; Charlotte, Emily, Brittany and Heidi.

He is an Ambassador for Girlguiding UK in Birmingham and also Patron of two charities: Side by Side Theatre Company (Stourbridge) and Wings, both charities for people with learning or development difficulties. He is a vice-president of the Gentlemen Songsters Male Voice Choir, a local Patron of Fairtrade and in 2011 was made Honorary Colonel of the Warwickshire and West Midlands (South Sector) Army Cadet Force. Michael Collie was awarded the TD in 2005 and the VRSM in 2015.
