= Rally Report =

- A Rally Report logo
- Presented by: William Woollard
- Starring: Tony Mason
- Country of origin: United Kingdom
- Original language: English
- No. of episodes: 60

Production
- Producer: Derek Smith Dennis Adams Tom Ross
- Running time: 30 minutes

Original release
- Network: BBC2
- Release: 24 November 1984 – 20 December 1998

Rally Report is a series of programmes broadcast by the BBC covering the Lombard RAC Rally of Great Britain – then the last round of the World Rally Championship.

It was transmitted on BBC2 from 1984 until 1998 and usually featured previews, a live stage, twice nightly reports and a wrap-up compilation. The show was made at BBC Pebble Mill and later branded as Top Gear Rally Report since unusually it was not made by BBC Sport. Top Gear presenter William Woollard presented the programme from rally headquarters with Sue Baker, Barrie Gill and later Tony Mason doing the location reports on the stages.

In 1987 Tony Mason joined Top Gear – first as a rally specialist and then as a major contributor.

The show's theme music was "Jewelled" (from the remix album Wishful Thinking) by Propaganda.

The show was curtailed to one review programme for 1990, owing to Sky having obtained rights to screen that year's event, but reverted to full coverage for 1991, the last year in which Woollard fronted the programme. From 1992 his place was taken by Steve Lee.
