= Adrian Simpson =

British television presenter (born 1971)

- Born: Adrian James Simpson; 24 April 1971 (age 55); Carshalton, London, England
- Education: University of Leeds
- Occupations: Journalist, presenter
- Years active: 1999–present
- Notable credit(s): Police Camera Action! Fightback Britain; BBC Top Gear; Sky News; A Place in the Sun; Thunder Races
- Children: 3

Adrian James Simpson (born 24 April 1971) is an English television presenter, presenting on Sky News on the overnight programme.

Simpson was born Carshalton, Surrey, he started his television career as a presenter on the BBC's Top Gear. He left as part of the programme's revamp to Channel 5's Fifth Gear, joining colleagues Vicki Butler Henderson, Tiff Needell and Quentin Willson. Between 2007 and 2009, he also presented the summary and video episodes of Police Camera Action! with the ITV newsreader Alastair Stewart.

In June 2010, Simpson became a news presenter on Sky News overnight programme.

In July 2011, Simpson became a director at Chillisauce Ltd. At Chillisauce, Simpson was in charge of a marketing campaign for 'Wear it Pink' in aid of breast cancer awareness, which involved building the world's largest bra, and erecting it on ITV tower. The Worlds Largest Bra was unveiled live on 'This Morning' TV programme on October 22, 2011.

In August 2013, Simpson became a presenter of the BBC One programme Fight Back Britain alongside Julia Bradbury and in January 2014 joined the presenting team on Channel 4's A Place in the Sun.
