= Current Account (TV programme) =

Current Account is a British current affairs television programme that was broadcast from 1968 until May 1983 on BBC Television in Scotland. Among its various presenters were Donald MacCormick, George Reid and Kenneth Roy. Transmitted weekly on a Thursday at 20:30 it consisted of a one subject filmed or one studio report. Its editor was Matthew Spicer.

The show was first called Checkpoint, and an 80-minute edition called Where Do we Go From Here? brought together MPS and commentators to discuss nationalism in front of a studio audience. When Alasdair Milne took over BBC Controller, Scotland he renamed it Current Account when it returned in the summer of 1968.

During the run-up to the 1979 Scottish devolution referendum it had a sister programme dealing only with politics called Public Account.
