= Vroom Vroom (TV series) =

- The Vroom Vroom logo
- Created by: Richard Greenwood
- Starring: Jon Desborough, Brendan Coogan, Lisa Rogers and Emma Parker Bowles
- Country of origin: United Kingdom
- No. of series: 2
- No. of episodes: 16

Production
- Running time: 45 mins approx

Original release
- Network: Sky One
- Release: 2006 – 2007

Vroom Vroom is a British television series shown on Sky One. The presenters were Brendan Coogan (Men and Motors), Jon Desborough (Sky News Sportsline), Lisa Rogers (Scrapheap Challenge), and Emma Parker Bowles (The Sun's motoring columnist). Each show ran for one hour, and featured a varied mix of segments, from test drives to banger racing and tips for buying and selling cars.

Each episode included a regular strand presented by Emma Parker Bowles who turns her hand to banger, lawn mower and mini-auto grass racing. Other contributors included segments by Bruno Senna, nephew of late Grand Prix driver Ayrton Senna and professional test driver Duncan Gray.

For the second series of the show, it had some new segments. Brendan Coogan's 'Test Drive' section was changed, instead of the car being put through various tests, it was subjected to an unusual test - such as the Audi Q7 was navigated through various courses, but driven by children. Another long running segment was run at Santa Pod to make a 1992 Mk 3 Vauxhall Astra 1.6 estate go faster via a weekly modification costing less than £150. Solutions included a performance air filter, exhaust, and stripping weight out of the car. Another weekly regular segment was "The Cat & Mouse Challenge" where celebrities had to evade a 4.2L Jaguar driven by one of the country's top banger racing drivers, Steve "Cecil" Anscombe.
