= Peter Macann =

English broadcaster

- Occupation: Television presenter
- Employer: BBC

Peter Macann is a British former actor, reporter, and television presenter who is most notable for co-hosting the BBC science show Tomorrow's World in the late 1980s and early 1990s.

Since retiring from the BBC, he has worked as a consultant for various companies on managing culture change within their organizations.

== Filmography ==
Title	Episode	Role	Year	Source
Q.E.D. (documentary)	Four Go Off to Space Camp	Himself – Narrator	1987	
Top Gear (documentary)		Himself – Presenter	1980	
Follow You Follow Me (short)		T.V. Reporter	1979	
A Family at War	The Other Side of the Hill	Richard Norris	1970	
The Wednesday Play	There Is Also Tomorrow	Interviewer	1969	
The Man in the Iron Mask	The King's Mistress	Count de Saint-Aignan	1968	
The Man in the Iron Mask	The Grand Design	Count de Saint-Aignan	1968	
Theatre 625	The Fanatics	Wagniére	1968	
Armchair Theatre	The Contact		1968	
Sexton Blake TV Christmas Special	The Vanishing Snowman	Jack	1967	
Escape	Private Enterprise	1st Guard	1967	
Send Foster	Hole in the Road		1967	
No Hiding Place	Sing Me the Old Song	Police Constable	1966	
ITV Play of the Week	Women Beware Women	Ganymede	1965	
Victoria Regina	Autumn	Prince of Wales	1964	
