= Middleton Hall =

Middleton Hall may refer to the following places in the United Kingdom:

- Middleton Hall, Carmarthenshire, site of the National Botanic Garden of Wales
- Middleton Hall, Cumbria, a listed building
- Middleton Hall, Earle, a location in Northumberland
- Middleton Hall, Middleton, Leeds
- Middleton Hall, Middleton, Northumberland, a country house near Belford
- Middleton Hall, Stoney Middleton, a restored 17th-century in Derbyshire
- Middleton Hall, Warwickshire, a Grade II* listed building dating from medieval times
- Middleton Hall exhibition space, Central Milton Keynes Shopping Centre, Buckinghamshire

== See also ==
- Middleton Hall Lakes, a nature reserve in Warwickshire, UK
