= Wheelbase (TV series) =

British TV car programme (1964–1975)

- Wheelbase title screen
- Genre: Motoring; Talk show
- Presented by: Gordon Wilkins; Cliff Michelmore
- Country of origin: United Kingdom
- No. of episodes: 207

Production
- Running time: 30 mins

Original release
- Network: BBC2
- Release: 1964 – 1975

Related
- Top Gear

Wheelbase is a BBC television series about cars, that was broadcast on BBC2 between 1964 and 1975.

== Presenters ==
Amongst its presenters were Gordon Wilkins between 1964 and 1973 and Cliff Michelmore. The show was the predecessor of Top Gear.

It featured Judith Jackson in the late 1960s, who also presented the BBC education series 'Exploring Science' in the early 1970s. Her husband was international racing driver Peter Jopp. They married in 1963, when he was aged 31, and she was 26 and working for ATV, living in West Bridgford. They divorced in 1976, when she was 40, and the motoring correspondent of the Sunday Times. Her son is Surrey Conservative MP Lincoln Jopp.

== History ==
Wheelbase was amongst the first programmes in the United Kingdom to be shown in colour during BBC2's "colour launching period".

Wheelbase's coverage of Formula One motor racing in the late 1960s was repeated during 2007 on United Kingdom satellite channel ESPN Classic. The programmes were transmitted largely as originally broadcast, but with occasional captions to put period commentary into context.

A subsequent series in October 1977 on BBC2 was 'Roadworthy' with Judith Jackson, repeated on BBC1 in October 1978.
