= Sniff Petrol =

- Founder and Owner: Richard Porter
- Categories: Motoring satire, Motorsport
- Frequency: Inactive
- Publisher: Online
- First issue: August 2001
- Country: United Kingdom
- Language: English
- Website: www.sniffpetrol.com

Sniff Petrol is an inactive online motoring satire magazine first published in 2001 on a weekly schedule. Due to other commitments of the writers, the schedule was reduced—first to a monthly schedule, then to a regularly updated blog format. It received over ten thousand hits a day.

Sniff Petrol articles comment on motoring and motorsport events (especially Formula One). Both fiction and non-fiction articles parody the styles of presentation and language used in various motoring fields. Parodies include motor manufacturer press releases, motoring magazine reviews, etc. The website ceased activity in 2022, but articles are still available online. TopGear now has a dedicated Satire section on its website.

== Regular features ==
Alongside satire directed at motoring, motorsport-related news, auto shows, and spiders, Sniff Petrol has several long-running features, including:

- Carcoat Damphands – A used car columnist who aims to give insider information on buying and selling cars. The writing uses a large number of fake motor trade colloquialisms and made-up rhyming slang, which results in a column of incomprehensible whimsy. The author signs off every report with the word "minty."
- Crazy Dave – A parody of the racing driver David Coulthard, this feature began during the 2005 Formula One season. It was a satirical comparison between the public relations attitude of the McLaren F1 team, who Coulthard had driven for in 2004, and the Red Bull team, who he was driving for in 2005.

Crazy Dave writes about Formula 1 using a fake urban slang. He later switches to conventional English for the closing remark, which is used to unashamedly promote a product or television program with which the real life Coulthard is associated.

- DriveL – The only regular non-satirical content of the site, these are car reviews authored by Richard Porter and primarily written in a day-by-day format. Articles are usually titled "A week with a [car name]", though some reviews encompass a shorter time period.
- Not advertisements – Spoof car adverts, usually based on a current campaign but modified for humour. These "adverts" will generally prey upon the perceived attributes of the owners and drivers of the advertised car, or perceived flaws of the car or its manufacturer. MG Rover was a frequent target of these spoofs until the company's demise in 2005. The last one showed a BMW iX with the caption "The Ultimate Disgusting Machine".
- The Schumachers – A running gag which began in August 2004 and appeared several times in following months, it features a picture of Michael Schumacher appearing to snarl a cruel, topical remark at his brother Ralf Schumacher, based upon the public view that younger brother Ralf was a lesser driver than Michael. The photograph has been Photoshopped several times during the life of this recurring joke to give the Schumacher brothers hats and clothes that reflect their current team or sponsors.
- Small Ads – Classified-style ads, generally spoofing recent Formula 1 activity.
- Roy Lanchester – A former local newspaper journalist turned blogger, Lanchester typifies a breed of freeloading car writer more concerned with getting fed and plied with alcohol at someone else's expense than with reviewing a car or product, which he always does in a fawning and uncritical way, often resorting to copying and pasting the manufacturer's own words to fill space. Frequent references are made to his enormous alcohol intake, and tendency towards accidentally soiling or otherwise destroying press cars while drunk.
- Troy Queef – A spoof columnist claimed to be the Executive Associate Editor-At-Large for Dab Of Oppo magazine. Queef uses an over-written, pretentious and self-aggrandising style inappropriate for the cheap, slow cars he reviews and signs off each column by claiming that the car in question was "a bitch" which he "spanked". Queef has only driven one car with an engine capacity in excess of 1.8 litres, which he crashed.
- Trentham Sleaves' Grand Prix Preview – A parody of Formula 1 print journalists and their accounts of Grand Prix weekends, which are often perceived as being overly romantic, self-indulgent, and clichéd. He frequently mentions his "casual" encounters with people such as "my old mate Alain Prost," and "a certain 1998/1999 World Champion", and misinterprets their open disdain for him as jovial banter. He often eats alone at "a charming little Italian off the beaten track, the name of which discretion prevents me from mentioning," and closes reports by predicting, in turn, that every single competing team may win on Sunday, signing off by reminding the reader that he will be enjoying every moment, "Because remember, I’m here and you’re not."

== Campaigning ==
Sniff Petrol has run several satirical campaigns since its inception. These have included

- Car Designer Face Hair Removal – An unusual campaign which offered money to car designers if they shaved off their existing beard or moustache. Met with some success when Peter Stevens, then lead designer at MG Rover, shaved off his moustache in return for a donation to charity.
- Jordan Sponsorship Offer – A short-lived campaign in which the Jordan F1 team was offered £20 to write Sniff Petrol on the side of their racing car.
- Moped (& Scooter) Campaign – A campaign which aimed to "rid the world of this sub-250cc menace".
- Stop The Cock – A long-running campaign which aimed to remove commentator James Allen from the then-current ITV F1 coverage. Sniff Petrol produced Stop The Cock T-shirts to promote the campaign leading to the publication of photographs depicting supporters sporting these shirts whilst standing next to F1 pundit Martin Brundle and ITV F1 anchor man Steve Rider.

Sniff Petrol has also produced a number of books, like Crap Cars (2005).

== Twitter ==
Sniff Petrol started a Twitter feed in April 2009. In October 2014, it had over 57,000 followers. The Sniff Petrol Twitter account is used chiefly to give real-time commentary on Formula 1 races and brief comment on motoring news as well as reports of mini-cab journeys undertaken by the author. The Sniff Petrol Twitter feed came 17th in the Humor category at the 2010 Shorty Awards.

== Media coverage ==
Sniff Petrol content has been reproduced on many other websites including US car blog Jalopnik and in other media, including the BBC TV series Top Gear. Porter credits the site (and Jeremy Clarkson's enjoyment of it) as being instrumental in his getting the job of script editor on Top Gear and later The Grand Tour.

Sniff Petrol has been mentioned in national newspapers including The Times, the Daily Telegraph and in the Irish Times.

In 2006, a series of Sniff Petrol spoof MG Rover advertisements were turned into a charity calendar.

== See also ==
- List of satirical news websites
