= Gill Pyrah =

British journalist

Gill Pyrah (born 16 June 1957 in Manchester) is an English broadcaster and journalist. She presented local programmes for BBC Birmingham in the late 1970s and early 1980s, she has worked for the Daily Telegraph, been a guest presenter on the Radio 4 programme Midweek and chaired the literary quiz Slightly Foxed on BBC Radio 4.

Pyrah was in the news during the 2004 Chelsea Flower Show after an incident between garden designer and television presenter Diarmuid Gavin and the contestant in the neighbouring garden, Gardeners' Question Time panellist Bunny Guinness. According to press reports it was Pyrah's questions to Gavin about the cost of his garden and whether it was connected to commitment to getting a gold medal that led to his storming off from a live interview.

She appeared on Have I Got News for You in 1990 and presented six editions of Top Gear in 1979–80. Pyrah also presents reports on Gardeners' Question Time.
