= William Woollard =

English television presenter

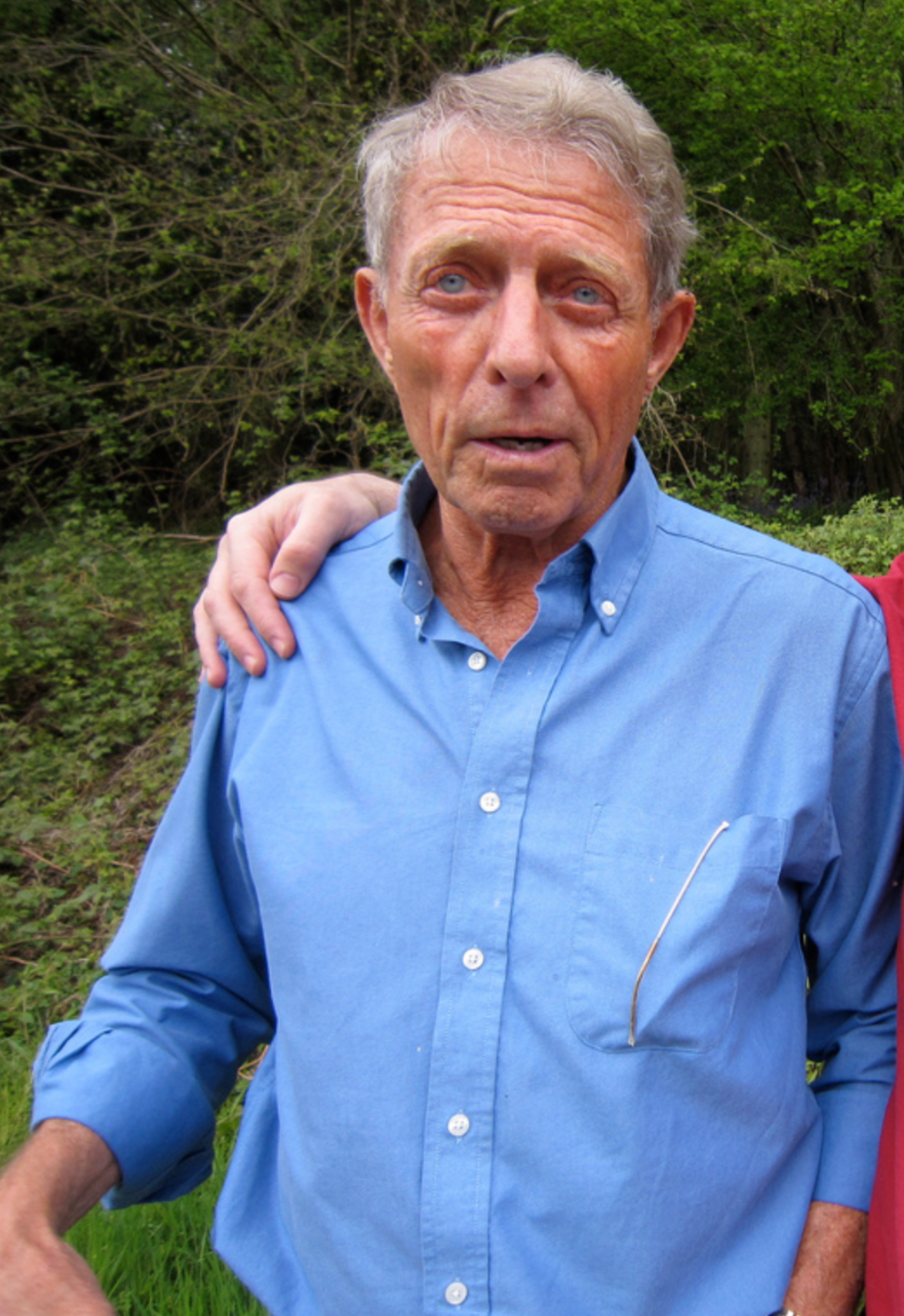
- Woollard in 2010
- Born: 23 August 1939 (age 87)
- Occupations: TV presenter, TV producer, screenwriter, fighter pilot, author
- Known for: Tomorrow's World, Top Gear

William Woollard (born 23 August 1939) is a British historian and retired television producer and presenter.

== Biography ==
Woollard went to a state grammar school in London and Oxford University. He trained to be a fighter pilot with the Royal Air Force. He worked with an oil company in Borneo and Oman. He has worked as a social scientist on corporate social responsibility with several American and European organisations. He has written about his Buddhist beliefs.

== Television career ==
Woollard has produced, written and presented many television documentaries and series, particularly on science and technology. They have been broadcast on the BBC and Channel 4 in the United Kingdom, as well as the Discovery Channel, the National Geographic Channel and the Public Broadcasting Service in the US.

He is known as a producer and presenter on the BBC's science magazine programme Tomorrow's World, and on the BBC's motoring programme Top Gear. On Tomorrow's World he was a presenter for 11 years.

Woollard fronted Top Gear for a decade from 1981, during which time it had an audience of up to 5 million. Woollard also presented Rally Report, an offshoot of Top Gear, covering the Lombard RAC Rally every year.

Woollard resigned from Top Gear in 1991 because his own production company, Inca, took off, producing documentaries for BBC and C4 in the UK and channels such as the Public Broadcasting Service and Discovery Channel in the US. Among Inca's commissions were the filming of the Royal Institution Christmas Lectures.

During the same period he was involved in writing and producing or presenting a range of other programmes, mainly under the banner of the BBC science documentary strand Horizon. These included:

- The Secret War, a six-part series that revealed the role that Britain's scientists played in the winning of the Second World War.
- Too Hot to Handle. A three-part series looking at the benefits and drawbacks of the nuclear power industry.
- The Energy Alternative. BBC television's first look at the problem of global warming, and the challenge presented by alternative energy technologies.
- Skyscraper. A five-part series on the building of a skyscraper in central New York City.

Since that time he has written or produced well over 100 programmes ranging over the fields of science and technology, from evolution, to space exploration, and from treasure hunting to the science of bridge building.

In 2000, Woollard made cameo appearances in the sitcom The Grimleys playing science teacher "Mr Woollard".

Woollard has worked as a scriptwriter on documentaries and he has authored books including one recounting his experience as a practising Buddhist.

== Publications ==
- The Reluctant Buddhist, ISBN 978-1-906210-35-9
- Buddhism and the Science of Happiness: A Personal Exploration of Buddhism in Today's World, ISBN 978-1-907652-73-8
