= Tom Coyne (broadcaster) =

British television presenter

- Born: 1930; South Shields, County Durham, England
- Died: 2 April 2015 (aged 84); England
- Occupations: Broadcaster, television presenter
- Years active: 1958–2011

Tom Coyne (1930– 2 April 2015) was a British news broadcaster, radio and television presenter who was known for being one of the earliest presenters of Top Gear.

== Early life ==
Coyne was born in South Shields and attended Corby Hall School in Sunderland, which was a Jesuit run grammar school (now St Aidan's Catholic Academy). He then worked for A. Reyrolle & Company, an engineering company based in Hebburn that manufactured switchgear for power stations. He enjoyed acting and was a member of the Westovian Theatre Company.

== Career ==
In his twenties Coyne was a presenter of the BBC radio programme Children's Hour. He made his first television appearance interviewing a miner for Tyne Tees Television and was the first news presenter for the station in 1959. He was then a presenter for the BBC regional news programme Midlands Today throughout the 1970s and 1980s, making 4,000 appearances, and was on the first edition of Nationwide, making many further appearances on the programme. He also presented Songs of Praise and in 1980 he returned to Tyne Tees Television to present the nightly news magazine programme Northern Life. During his career Coyne interviewed many notable people, including Catherine Cookson and Muhammad Ali. He was also the voice of the Geordie gamekeeper, Gordon Armstrong, on the BBC Radio 4 soap opera The Archers for 3 years.
