= Chris Goffey =

British television presenter

Christopher Robert Goffey (born 17 October 1945) is an English journalist and television personality, best known as a presenter of the BBC motoring television series Top Gear.

He was with Channel 4 since the mid-1980s and worked with two motoring programmes (The Motor Show and Wheeltracks) before returning to Top Gear. He has worked on many different corporate, instructional, and motivational films for a variety of clients.

== Early life ==
Goffey was born in Bury, Greater Manchester. From 1965 he honed his skills with the Ruislip Northwood Post, the Bucks Advertiser (now the Bucks Herald), and the Slough Evening Mail.

== Motoring press ==
Between 1972 and 1977 Goffey worked as a member of the editorial team of Britain's Autocar magazine, where for five years his responsibilities included the news pages. Recognition came in 1975 when he was designated News Editor. Leaving Autocar in 1977, he obtained his own editorship with the journal Motor Trader. He is a member of the Guild of Motoring Writers.

== Top Gear ==
Goffey's first foray into television was on the Thames Television series Drive In and its successor Wheels in the late 1970s but in 1981 he crossed over to the BBC to join Top Gear. His demeanour was deliberately understated, calm, and practical when dealing with all road tests on Top Gear. His beard, formal attire, and common sense were a direct foil to the more in-your-face antics of his colleague Jeremy Clarkson. However, during a race among all the Top Gear presenters in SEAT Ibizas in 1996, Clarkson noted that the last time Goffey had been on a track, he had been "tearing the tyres off an Audi 80". In another incident contrasting with his sedate image, Goffey accidentally overturned an Austin Maestro while conducting a test drive for the programme to mark the car's launch.

Goffey left Top Gear in 2000 – the year before its initial cancellation by the BBC – after sustaining a broken neck in a horse riding accident.

== Later career ==
Goffey was one of the presenters, alongside Richard Hammond and Brendan Coogan, on the first series of Dream Deals, a motoring show which aired on the Men & Motors channel, in 2001.

In a May 2007 Top Gear Magazine column, Jeremy Clarkson suggested that some viewers would like Goffey back on the programme and would prefer a more serious approach but that most of the audience wanted them to "cock about".

== Personal life ==
Goffey is the father of music video director Nic Goffey and Supergrass drummer Danny Goffey. He married Linda Nolan in north-west Surrey in 1969. They live in South Oxfordshire, and have three grandchildren through son Danny.
