= Tom Boswell (television presenter) =

Television presenter (1943–1990)

- Born: August 30, 1943; Simla
- Died: November 19, 1990 (aged 47); Reading, England
- Occupation: journalist

Tom Boswell (30 August 1943, in Simla – 19 November 1990, in Reading) was a journalist who worked in both BBC Radio and Television.

In radio he contributed to the highly successful Radio Four series Going Places and the Saturday morning programme Breakaway.

As a television presenter he contributed items for Top Gear. He presented two episodes in 1981 and 1982, and then appeared in twenty episodes between 1988 and his death in 1990. His specialties on Top Gear included safety and economy topics such as the new Merritt engine and protection against car theft. Boswell also reviewed motorcycles during the show.

== Death ==
Boswell died after a long battle against cancer and was survived by his wife Irene.
