= Tony Baker =

Tony Baker may refer to:

- Tony Baker (running back, born 1945) (1945–1998), American football running back for the New Orleans Saints, Philadelphia Eagles, Los Angeles Rams and San Diego Chargers
- Tony Baker (running back, born 1964), American football running back for the Atlanta Falcons, Cleveland Browns, Phoenix Cardinals and Frankfurt Galaxy
- Tony Baker (died 2017), English cricket administrator; secretary of Hampshire County Cricket Club from 1986 to 2001
