= Brendan Coogan =

British television and radio presenter

- Born: 17 July 1970 (age 55); Middleton, Lancashire, England
- Education: Cardinal Langley Roman Catholic High School
- Alma mater: Manchester Metropolitan University
- Occupation: Television presenter
- Television: Top Gear; Vroom Vroom
- Relatives: Steve Coogan (brother); Martin Coogan (brother)
- Awards: 2004 Royal Television Society (RTS) Best Presenter (North West)

Brendan Coogan (born 17 July 1970) is a British television and radio presenter, from Middleton, Greater Manchester. In January 1999, Coogan briefly presented the BBC TV motoring programme Top Gear, following the departure of former host Jeremy Clarkson, but left after a few months, following a drink-driving conviction. Between 1999 and 2001, he was a presenter on BBC Radio 5 Live.

From 2003 to 2004, he was a regular face on Granada Television in north-west England. In 2004, he won a Royal Television Society award for Best Presenter. Two of his brothers are comedian Steve Coogan, and former singer of the Mock Turtles, Martin Coogan.

Since 2008, Coogan has been a regular presenter on BBC Radio Manchester, filling in on The Eamonn O'Neal and Jimmy Wagg Show. In April 2006, he became a presenter for the Sky One motoring show Vroom Vroom. He was the live commentator on Cirque de Celebrité on Sky One in 2006.
