= Russell Bulgin =

British journalist

Russell Bulgin (1958–2002) was a British automotive journalist.

Russell Bulgin was born in Bromsgrove, the son of Brian F.J.Bulgin by his marriage to Barbara J.Warman.

He worked for many of the world's leading magazines including Motor as sports editor, Evo, Car, Autocar, Cars and Car Conversions, Motor Sport and also newspapers such as the Daily Telegraph. He was a close personal friend of racing driver Ayrton Senna and his interview with the Brazilian racer is highly regarded.

Support for independent manufacturers was shown at the long term review of the car supplied by Midas Cars for long term review at Motor Magazine. Russell explained Harold Dermott's development of the independently produced small car and the involvement of designers Richard Oakes and later Gordon Murray of "Brabham" Formula One team

For the final five years of his life, he was married to concept car designer Cathryn Espinosa.

Bulgin died of cancer in 2002.

A book was published after his death, edited by his former colleagues. They selected some of what they saw as his best works for inclusion as well as a selection of personal emails. The proceeds from the book went to the Royal Marsden Hospital where Bulgin had been treated.
