= Steve Berry (presenter) =

British media presenter

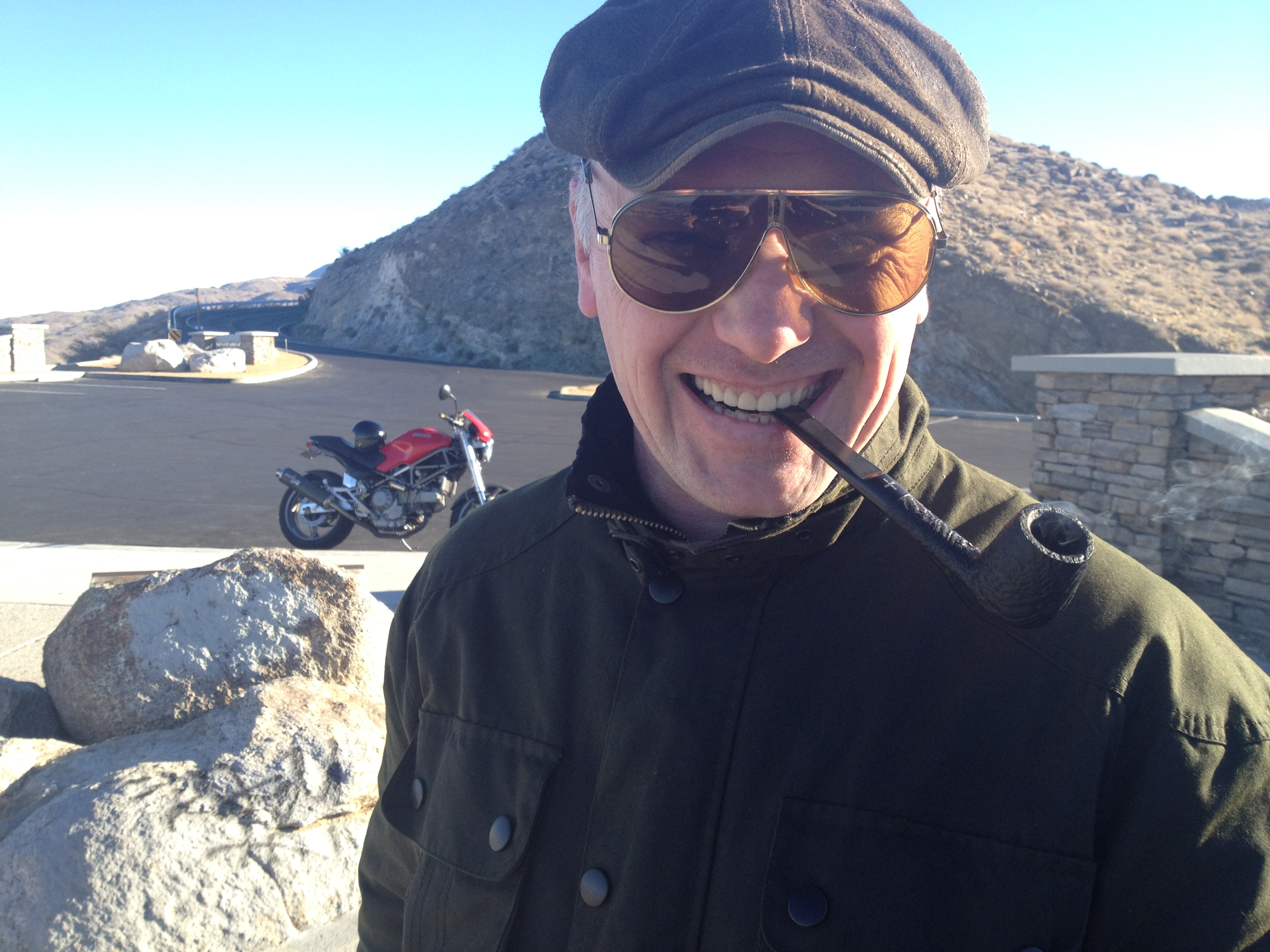
Steve Berry, Highway 74 Calif. Jan 2013.

Steve Berry is a British television and radio presenter, best known as a member of the presenting team for the BBC Two motoring programme Top Gear from 1993 to 1999, where he reviewed motorcycles and made features relating to them.

As well as the main programme, he was the main presenter of the Top Gear Radio Show on BBC Radio 5 Live which was broadcast from 1994 to 1998, and appeared on the spin-off programmes Top Gear Motorsport, Top Gear Ex-Files and Top Gear GTi.

Berry wrote and presented The Bike's the Star, a four-part documentary series for BBC2 and produced British Biker Build Off for Discovery Channel in 2005 and Bennett's Biker Build Off for ITV's Men & Motors in 2006.

Berry appears regularly as a guest on BBC radio, has hosted phone-in shows on Talksport and writes for The Sunday Times. For some time, Berry presented 'the longest show on UK radio' for Talksport and after guest appearances on 105.4 Century Radio, he became the presenter of the breakfast show on 106.1 Rock Radio, a classic rock station based in Manchester until 2011.

He produced and directed Motor Morphers, an engineering challenge show made by ITN for Channel 5 in May 2013. He writes a regular column 'Berry on Classics' in Classic Car Weekly and is a regular expert contributor to BBC Breakfast.

In January 2014 Berry returned as the breakfast presenter for 106.1 RealXS (previously known as 106.1 Rock Radio). He presents a weekly radio show Steve's Speedshop on FAB Radio International, described as 'a digital man-cave for the passionate petrolhead'. In April 2019 it was announced that he was leaving his breakfast show that he hosts on XS Manchester later the same month. He hosts a monthly motoring phone-in on BBC radio Wales and is a regular guest on the Jeremy Vine Show on Radio 2.
