= Pulling Power =

- Genre: Motoring
- Directed by: Martin Gent
- Presented by: Mike Brewer; Edd China; Michele Newman; Mike Rutherford; Sarah-Jane Mee; Roger Cook
- Country of origin: United Kingdom
- Original language: English

Production
- Executive producers: Duncan Rycroft; Mike Blair; Mike Morley
- Producers: Mike Burch; Michael Kretzmer; Julia Silverton; Soraya Taylor
- Editors: Mike Burch; Martin Gent

Original release
- Network: Central Television
- Release: 15 May 1997 – 10 October 2002

Pulling Power is a regional motoring programme shown only on Central Television (ITV in the Midlands) in 1996. However, it returned in 2005 and was shown on ITV1 on a series trial basis until 2008, and it was also as a filler programme at times. It has also been shown on ITV4. Presenters included Mike Brewer, Edd China, Michele Newman, Roger Cook, Mike Rutherford, and Sarah-Jane Mee.

== History ==
The first episode of Pulling Power was broadcast by Central Television on 15 May 1997, with presenters James Allen and Sally Gray along with guests Ken Morley and Gary Rhodes in a 30-minute running time including advertisements. Four series were aired between the debut year, 1997, and five years later on 10 October 2002. Mike Rutherford appeared in the 1998 NEC Birmingham Motorshow episode of the show.

The show was later renewed in 2005 until it was cancelled three years later due to low ratings.
