= Stephen Lee (TV presenter) =

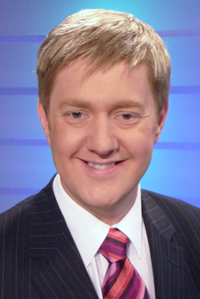
- Born: 1972 (age 53–54); Norwich, Norfolk, England
- Known for: Television news presenting and reporting

Stephen Lee (born 1972) is a British-Australian journalist and television presenter, best known as a newsreader for ITV News and GMTV in the United Kingdom.

== Early life and education ==
Lee was born in Norwich, Norfolk. He graduated from Highbury College, Portsmouth in 1992 with a diploma in Broadcast journalism awarded by the National Council for the Training of Broadcast Journalists (NCTBJ).

== Career ==
=== British media ===
==== BBC ====
In 1992, Lee joined BBC Radio Norfolk as a radio reporter, newsreader and radio presenter. He presented the breakfast programme "Today in Norfolk", and the drivetime show "Norfolk Tonight", as well as a weekend entertainment show called "Saturday Stretch". He worked briefly for the BBC's regional news programme "Look East" before moving to the BBC's base in Cambridge where he worked in both radio and television. He presented and produced the Breakfast and Drivetime Shows on BBC Radio Cambridgeshire. In this period, Stephen was selected by Cellnet to become the voice of its national mobile phone network.

==== ITV ====
Lee joined ITV Anglia in 1998 presenting news bulletins during GMTV and reporting as a News Correspondent for Anglia News. In late 2006 he became the male anchor of the ITV news programme Anglia Tonight with co-presenters Clare Weller, Becky Jago and Sascha Williams. In February 2007, Lee took part in an ice skating challenge inspired by ITV's "Dancing on Ice", learning a routine in five weeks. In October 2007, Lee was invited by Sarah Brown, the prime minister Gordon Brown's wife, to a reception at 10 Downing Street, to represent ITV Anglia at the network's Carer of the Year Awards, of which he was a judge.

==== GMTV ====
in 2008, Lee moved to the national breakfast magazine programme GMTV as a news reporter. Notable assignments included red carpet interviews in London's West End. Lee announced he planned to emigrate to Australia in the spring of 2009.

=== Australian media ===
In June 2009, Lee joined Network 10 as Program Editor for Ten Morning News a national news program broadcast across Australia, presented by Ron Wilson. In April 2012, Lee became the Australia and New Zealand TV Bureau Chief for Reuters. Lee joined SBS News in May 2013 to become Program Editor of the network's nightly news program, SBS World News. in October 2018, Lee was a presenter for Sibos TV at its annual banking and financial conference in Sydney.

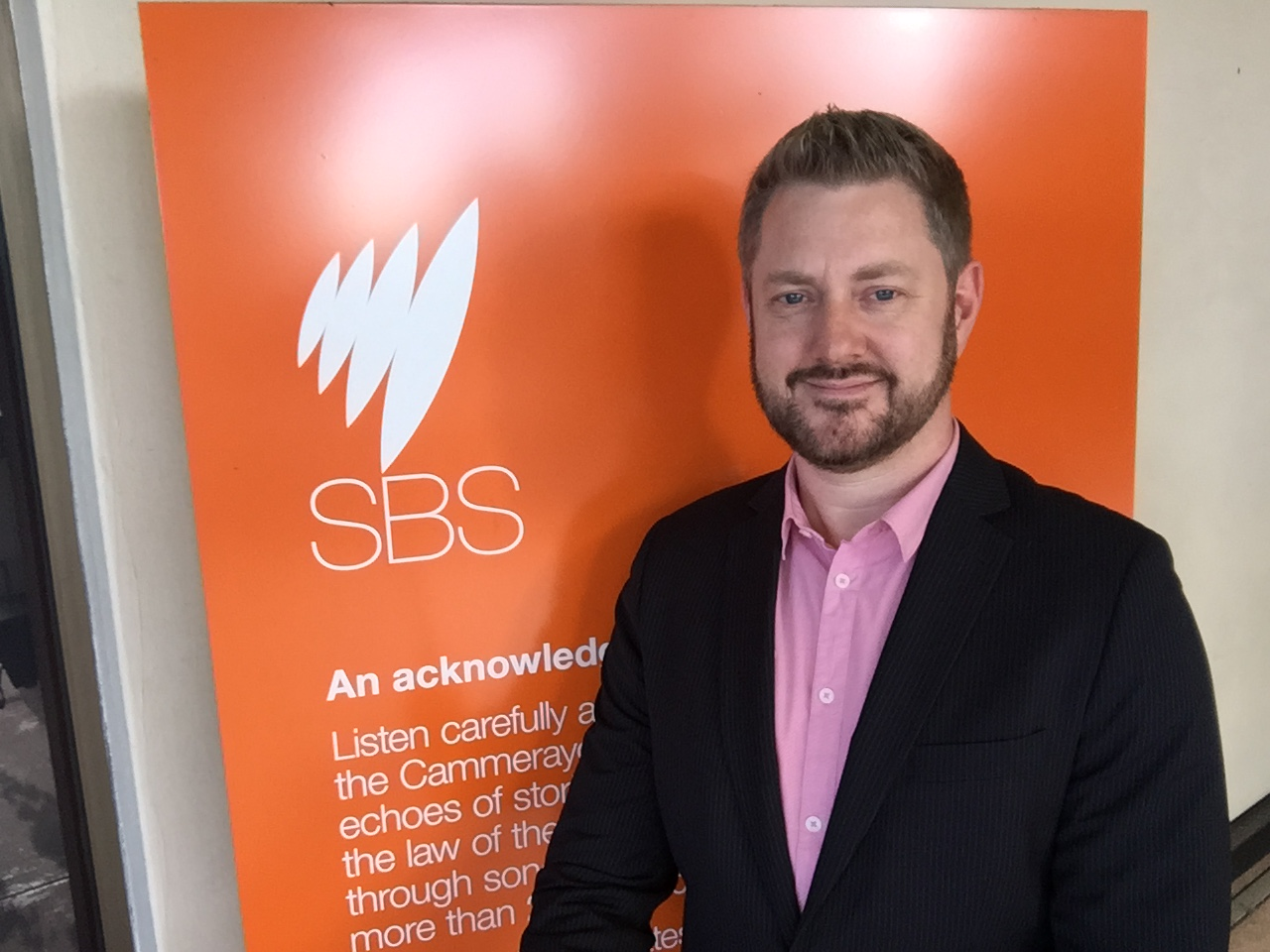
Stephen Lee outside the SBS television studios in Sydney

=== Other activities ===
Lee is a registered Marriage Celebrant appointed under the Australian Marriage Act 1961, able to legally conduct weddings. In May 2017 he was selected by Google Australia to address a conference on successful small business digital skills, reprising his presentation for a Google Australia Digital Garage event in February 2019. Lee is also a public supporter of marriage equality, signing an open letter of support organised by Australian Marriage Equality ahead of the introduction of same sex marriage across Australia in December 2017. In 2017, Lee discussed how same sex marriage was changing terminology around weddings with Australian news site news.com.au and predicted in an interview with The New Daily that "Australia is poised for same-sex Asian wedding tourism boom". In November 2018, Lee appeared on the ABC's AM radio program to discuss how 12 months of marriage equality had unfolded. In February 2019, Lee appeared in a video produced by Google Australia titled, "Open to everyone: Connecting customers to LGBTQ-friendly businesses". Lee was interviewed on SBS News in August 2021 about the effect of the COVID-19 lockdown on weddings in Sydney.

== Personal life ==
Lee is married and lives in Sydney.
