= Mike Brewer =

British presenter of motoring television programmes (born 1964)

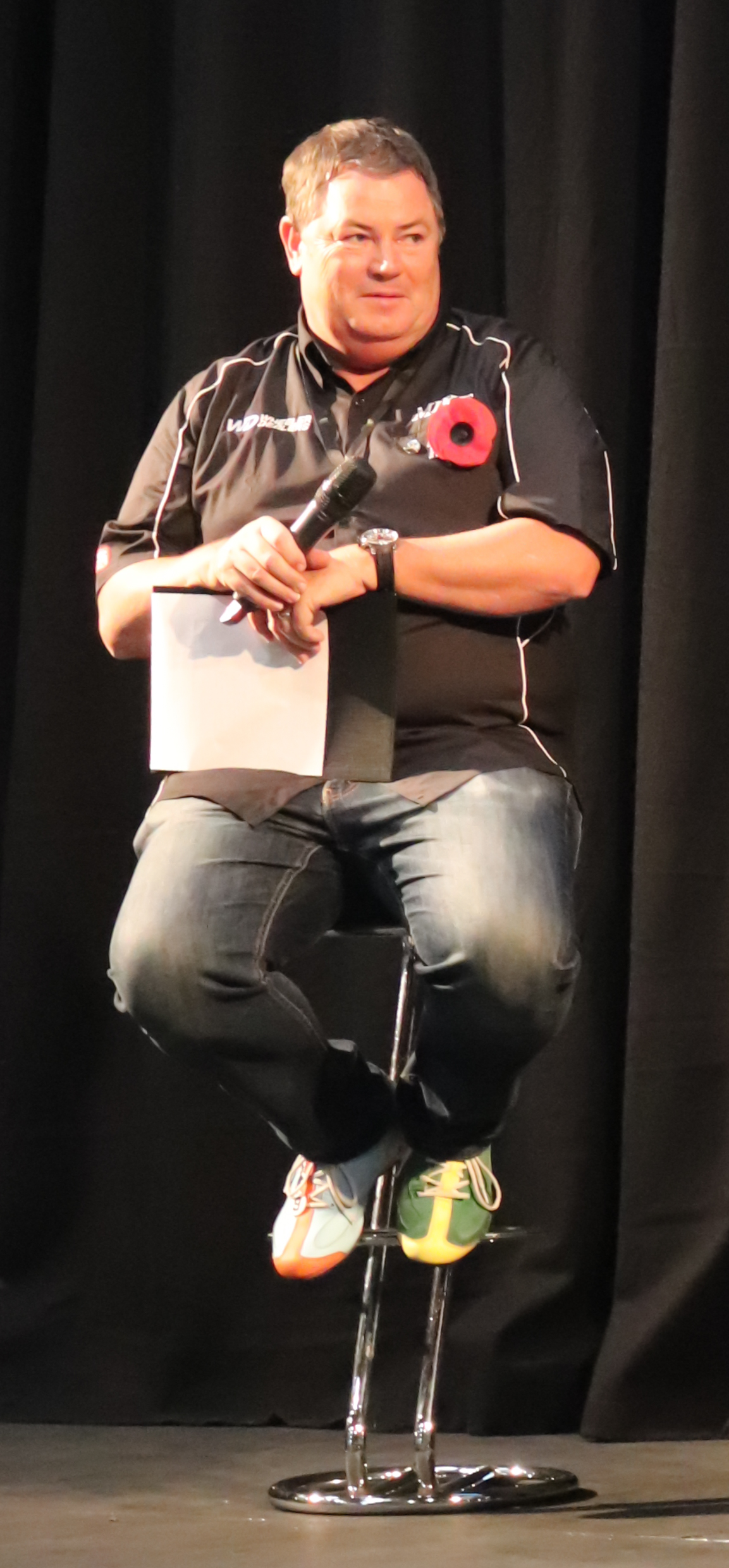
- Brewer at the 2018 NEC Classic Car Show
- Born: 28 August 1964 (age 61); Lambeth, London, England, UK
- Occupations: Television presenter, car trader, journalist, talk show host, media personality
- Years active: 1997–present
- Known for: Wheeler Dealers
- Spouse: Michelle (m. 1992)
- Children: 1
- Website: mikebrewer.tv

Mike Brewer (born 28 August 1964) is an English car trader-turned-presenter of motoring television programmes. He currently presents Wheeler Dealers on the Discovery Channel with Marc "Elvis" Priestley.

== Early life ==
Brewer was born in 1964 in Lambeth, London, to Roger Wilks and Doreen Fitzgerald. His father Roger was the owner at one point of a Ford Popular called "Mr Popstar", and was heavily involved in vehicle customizing, which helped Brewer discover his passion for motoring. Brewer's first car was a beige Mini 850cc.

== Television career ==
Brewer's television shows have included Driven on Channel 4, Deals on Wheels, Pulling Power, Wrecks to Riches, Auto Trader, Wheeler Dealers and Wheeler Dealers Trading Up. With the exception of Driven and Pulling Power, all these shows have subsequently aired on the Discovery Channel.

He has appeared in a series called Revved Up in which cars are modified, and presents coverage of the British Rally Championship on Sky Sports. He has presented a show called Remote Madness, in which people with remote controlled mini cars, boats, planes and helicopters compete in a multi challenge race.

In 2010, he changed direction and fronted a new Discovery Channel series Frontline Battle Machines, where he went to Afghanistan, and accompanied front line troops, showing how they use their motorised equipment. At one point his helicopter took enemy ground fire, injuring the pilot in the head and damaging a hydraulic line, forcing a landing.

=== Wheeler Dealers ===
In October 2003, Brewer was hired by the Discovery Channel to present their new motoring show, which was to be titled Wheeler Dealers. Upon its launch, the programme was met with success, and featured Edd China as co-host and mechanic. Following changes to the show's production, China stepped down as co-host in 2017 and was replaced by Ant Anstead.

In 2013, a spin off of Wheeler Dealers was created called Wheeler Dealers - Trading Up. The show featured Brewer travelling around the world buying and selling various cars to reach a final goal of owning a supercar.

January 2020 saw the premier on the Discovery Channel of spin off series Wheeler Dealers: Dream Car. Mike Brewer and former Formula 1 mechanic Marc "Elvis" Priestly help car owners trade up their unwanted vehicles to get them the car of their dreams.

== Business career ==
In addition to his TV career, Brewer is still active in the car industry, opening Mike Brewer Motors in 2012. The dealership, which has now closed permanently, was based in Sheffield and was nominated for Autotrader dealership of the year in 2022. He has also launched the only annual awards for used car dealers in the UK.

== Personal life ==
Brewer has several advanced licences: a racing licence, an advanced driving licence, and a world speed licence, which allows him to compete at world speed events.

Brewer is married to his wife Michelle. They live in Warwickshire, and have one daughter.

== Filmography ==
=== Television ===
Year	Title	Role	Channel
1997-2001	Deals on Wheels	Presenter	Channel 4
1997-2002	Pulling Power	Presenter	ITV1
1999	Driven	Presenter	Channel 4
2003–2023	Wheeler Dealers	Presenter	Discovery Channel
2009	Auto Trader	Presenter	Discovery Channel
2020–2021	Wheeler Dealers: Dream Car	Presenter	Discovery Channel
2020	World’s Greatest Cars	Co-Presenter	Quest
2024	Wheeler Dealers World Tour	Presenter	Discovery Channel
2025	Mike Brewer: Born Dealer	Presenter	Discovery Channel

== Awards and honours ==
On 25 October 2000, Brewer was in a team that set a new British 24-hour Endurance Land Speed Record in a Volvo S60 T5.

In 2004, Brewer won the Royal Television Society Midland Centre award for "Best In Vision Personality".

== Bibliography ==
- Mike Brewer's The Wheeler Dealer Know How!, Veloce Publishing, 2013, ISBN 9781845844899
