= Tony Mason (co-driver) =

British rally co-driver and television presenter

Tony Mason is a British former rally co-driver and television presenter. In 1972, he navigated Roger Clark to victory in the RAC Rally and the team also finished second in the event twice in 1974 and 1975, the only British crew to do so in a period spanning 35 years. He has also competed as a driver himself, and was recently co-driver for Finnish driver Hannu Mikkola with whom he competed for Ford in a recent Classic Rally in New Zealand.

== Biography ==
Following his retirement from rallying, he became a presenter on the BBC Two motoring programme Top Gear between 1986 and 1998, where he commented on motorsport, as well as presenting general interest items about items such as fire engines, Leyland buses, vintage Rolls-Royces and high-performance Jaguars through to Eddie Stobart trucks and Volvo's £15 million concept bus – the most expensive vehicle that he, or anyone else on Top Gear, has ever driven.

A particularly memorable report was when Mason teamed up again with Roger Clark to test an exact replica of his Ford Escort RS1600 on the programme at full speed through a forest.

He was also regularly seen on Top Gear Motorsport where his co presenters gave him the nickname "Perry". and the BBC's coverage of the World Rally Championship, particularly the RAC Rally, as well as coverage of the Goodwood Festival of Speed. Mason is currently appearing in two ten-part series on the Sky Discovery Channel entitled Off the Road and Classic Car Club.

Mason has also written four books and occasionally writes articles for newspapers and magazines, such as the Daily Telegraph and the Daily Express. He is often seen as both a compere and after-dinner speaker.

Mason also ran a company, known as Tony Mason, selling car accessories to the trade for resale to the general public. The company's most notable products were door guards, which, at one time, were big business and two companies were selling them.
