= Auto Trader (TV series) =

British television programme

- Presented by: Mike Brewer; Edd China
- Country of origin: United Kingdom
- Original language: English

Production
- Running time: 30 minutes

Original release
- Network: Discovery Channel

Auto Trader was a British television series, first shown on the Discovery Channel. It was presented by Mike Brewer and Edd China, who have worked together on other television series, including Wheeler Dealers.

Each episode was thirty minutes long. The programme was set in the fictitious garage called Mike's Motors.

The format for each episode is the same:

- Mike introduces a buyer who is interested in purchasing a certain type of car e.g.: small hatchback, luxury car etc. He has three or more cars on offer, and the buyer decides which ones he or she is most interested in, taking usually two for a test drive. Mike gives details of any potential problems with the cars. At the end of the episode, the buyer decides which car to buy.
- Edd meets a seller who has been trying to sell their car for a number of weeks. There is usually a reason the car hasn't sold and he works with the seller to repair and clean the vehicle, usually increasing the value of the car.
- Mike shows the viewer how to spot a lemon, working as a dodgy seller with a potential buyer, or meeting "reformed car clocker" Tony who shows Mike how to spot a clocked, cloned or stolen vehicle.

The series has been repeated on Discovery Turbo.
