= Shed =

Type of structure: a small hut used for storage or as a workspace

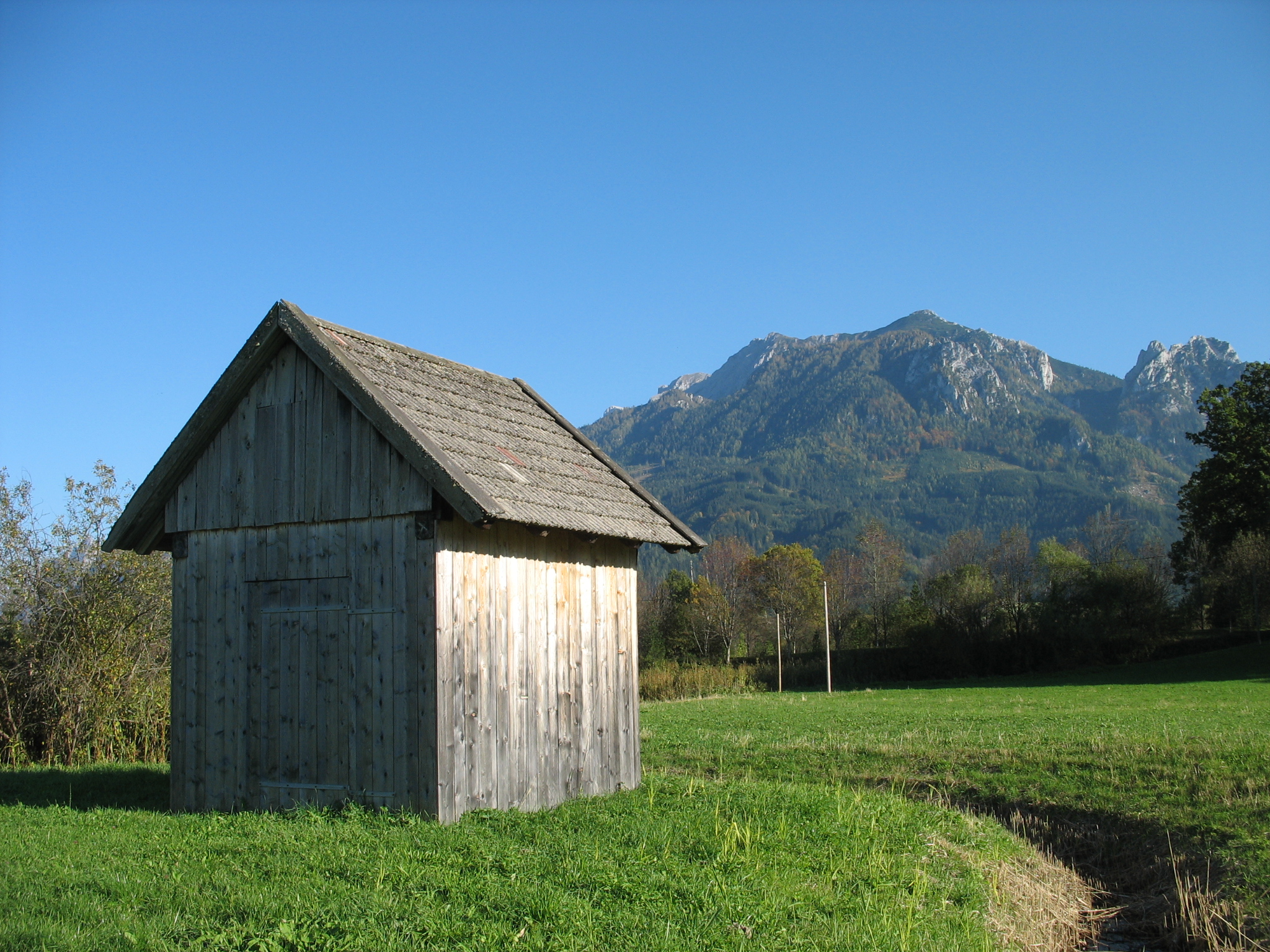
A rural shed

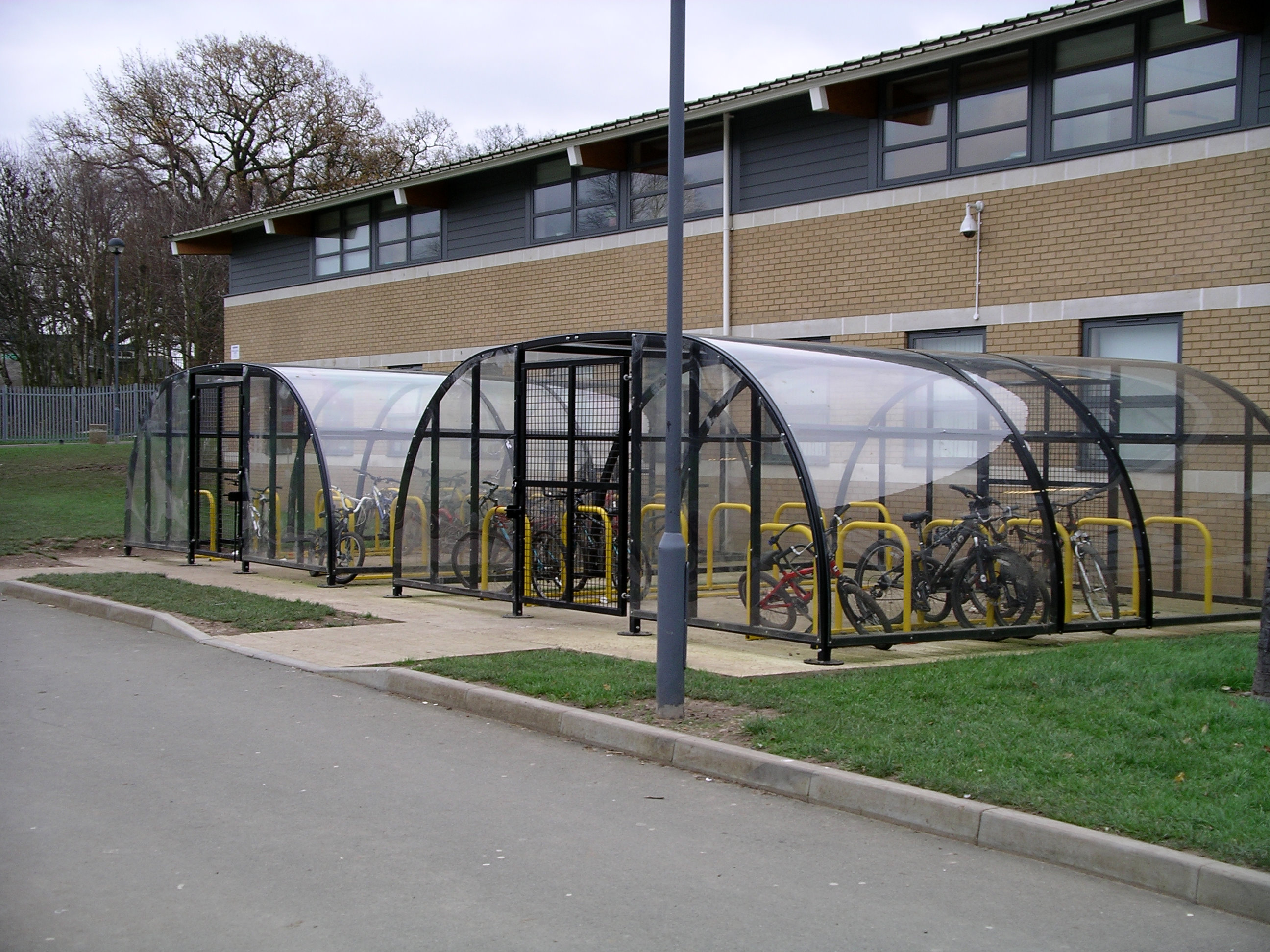
Modern secure bike sheds

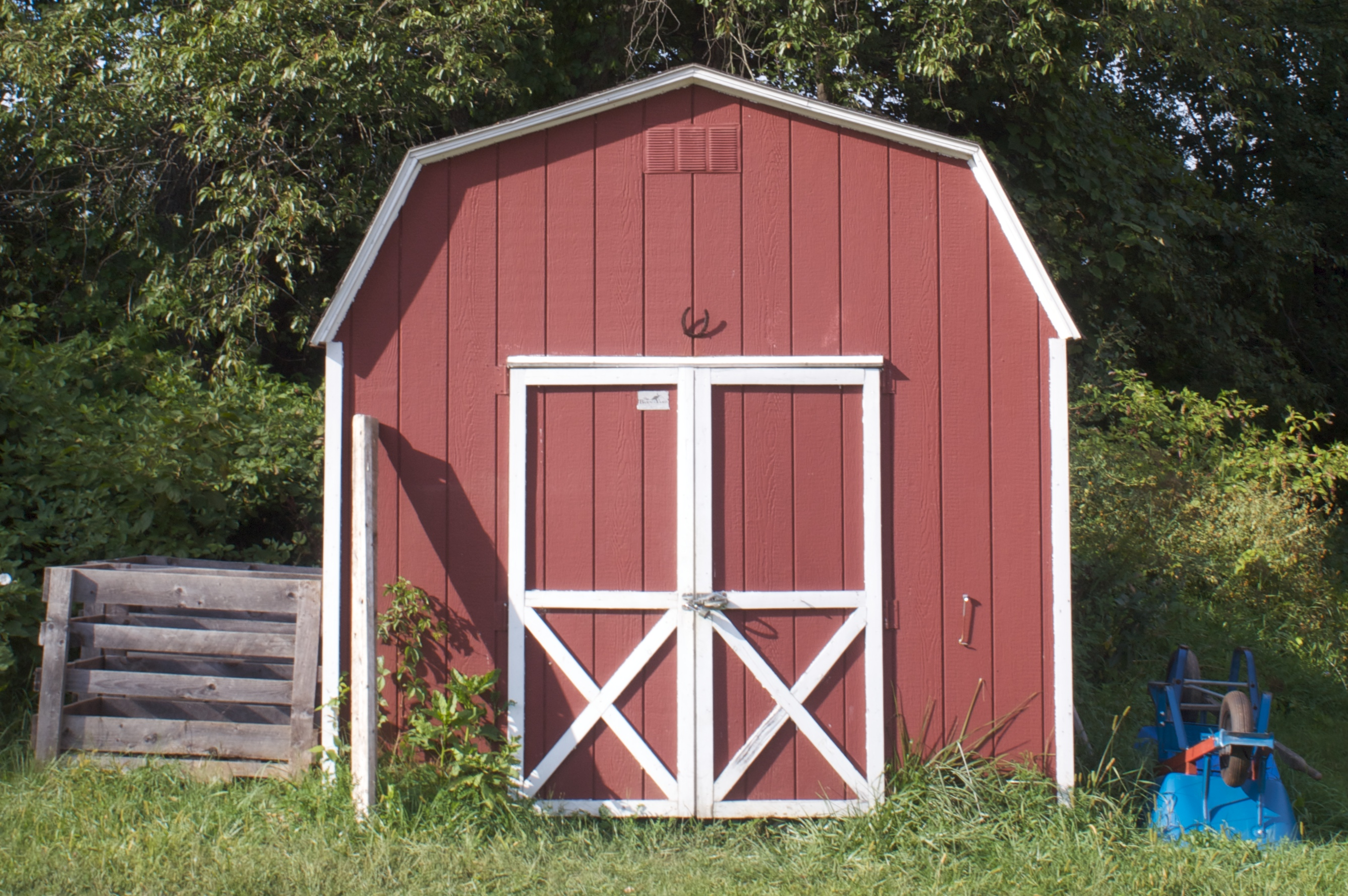
A garden shed with a gambrel roof

A shed is typically a simple, single-storey (though some sheds may have two or more stories and or a loft) roofed structure, often used for storage, for hobbies, or as a workshop, and typically serving as outbuilding, such as in a back garden or on an allotment. Sheds vary considerably in their size and complexity of construction, from simple open-sided ones designed to cover bicycles or garden items to large wood-framed structures with shingled roofs, windows, and electrical outlets. Sheds used on farms or in the industry can be large structures. The main types of shed construction are metal sheathing over a metal frame, plastic sheathing and frame, all-wood construction (the roof may be asphalt shingled or sheathed in tin), and vinyl-sided sheds built over a wooden frame. Small sheds may include a wooden or plastic floor, while more permanent ones may be built on a concrete pad or foundation. Sheds may be lockable to deter theft or entry by children, domestic animals, wildlife, etc.

== Etymology ==
The word is recorded in English since 1481, as shadde, possibly a variant of shade. The word shade comes from the Old English word sceadu, which means "shade, shadow, darkness". The term is Proto-Germanic. Its cognate, skadwo also means "shady place, protection from glare or heat".

The Old English word is spelled in different ways, such as shadde, shad or shedde, all of which come from an Old Teutonic/Anglo-Saxon root word for separation or division. The first attested usage of the word, in 1481, was in the sentence, "A yearde in whiche was a shadde where in were six grete dogges".

The Anglo Saxon word shud, which means "cover" may also have been part of the development of the word. In 1440, a shud was defined as a "... schudde, hovel, swyne kote or howse of sympyl hyllynge [covering] to kepe yn beestys".

== Terminology ==
Depending on the region and type of use, a shed may also be called a shack, outhouse, or "outbuilding". Sheds may be classified as "accessory buildings" in municipal bylaws which may regulate their size, appearance, and distance from the principal building and boundary lines.

== Uses ==
=== Agricultural sheds ===
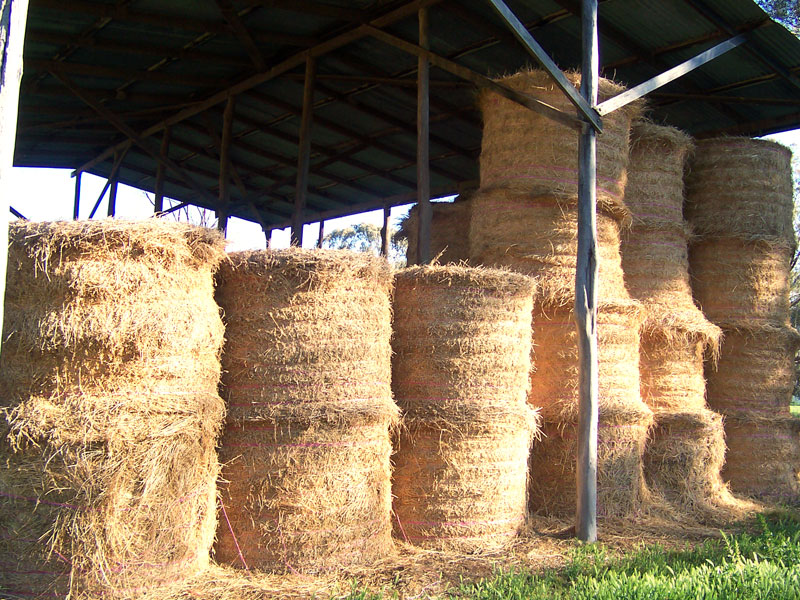
A hay shed typical of Australia and New Zealand

Arena sheds may have a simple open roof structure, or be partially walled or fully enclosed. They are typically used as horse-riding equestrian venues, providing all-year usage of the facility with protection from the weather.

Farm sheds and other outbuildings are used to store farm equipment, tractors, tools, hay, and supplies, or to house horses, cattle, poultry or other farm animals. Run-in sheds, also known in the USA as loafing sheds, are three-sided structures with an open face used for horses and cattle.

Shearing sheds can be large sheds found on sheep stations to accommodate large-scale sheep shearing.

=== Bike sheds ===
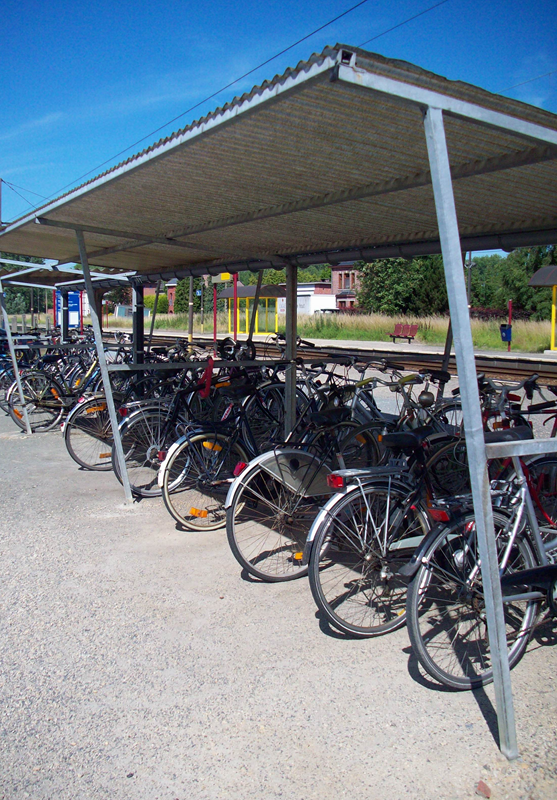
A bicycle shed

Bicycle parking sheds are usually open-air structures containing a rack on which bikes can be supported and locked, and a roof to offer shading and keep weather elements (especially rain and snow) off the bikes and their riders while mounting and dismounting. Bike sheds range from little more than a gazebo or awning striding over street furnitures, to more complex structures with guard rails, walls or mesh fences (to allow ventilation) and locking security doors or gates.

=== Boatsheds ===
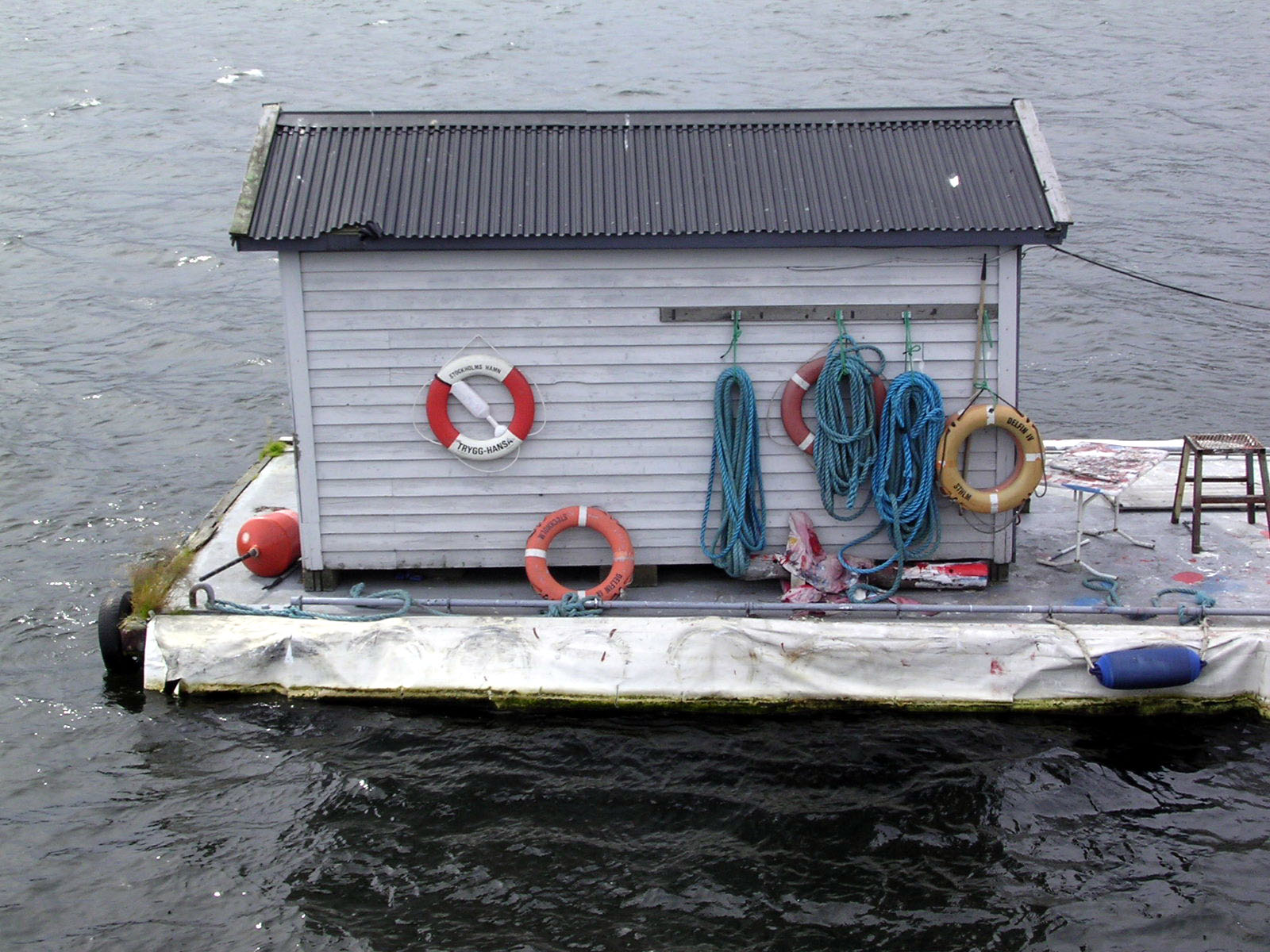
A waterside shed in Sweden

Boatsheds (or boat sheds) are typically lockable wooden sheds built near a body of water to store small private boats, bathing suits, life vests and related items. Boat sheds used for rowing clubs are generally larger structures for storing rowing skiffs.

=== Garden sheds ===
Garden tool sheds, including allotment sheds, are used to store seeds, soil, hoses, portable sprinklers, or garden tools such as hand rakes, shovels, lawnmowers, etc.

=== Railway sheds ===
Engine sheds are structures used for the maintenance or storage of railway locomotives. In Britain, these are also called motive power depots.

Goods sheds are railway buildings designed for storing goods before or after carriage in a train.

Train sheds are buildings adjacent to a railway station where the tracks and platforms are covered by a roof. The first train shed was built in 1830 at Liverpool's Crown Street Station.

Snow sheds are strongly built timber or reinforced-concrete tunnels that protect railroad tracks (or roads) from avalanches.

=== Storage sheds ===
These may contain any items any person wishes to store and to organise and/or protect from the weather and theft.

=== Tool sheds ===
These may contain hand tools and/or power tools used to repair automobiles or for construction.

=== Wood sheds ===
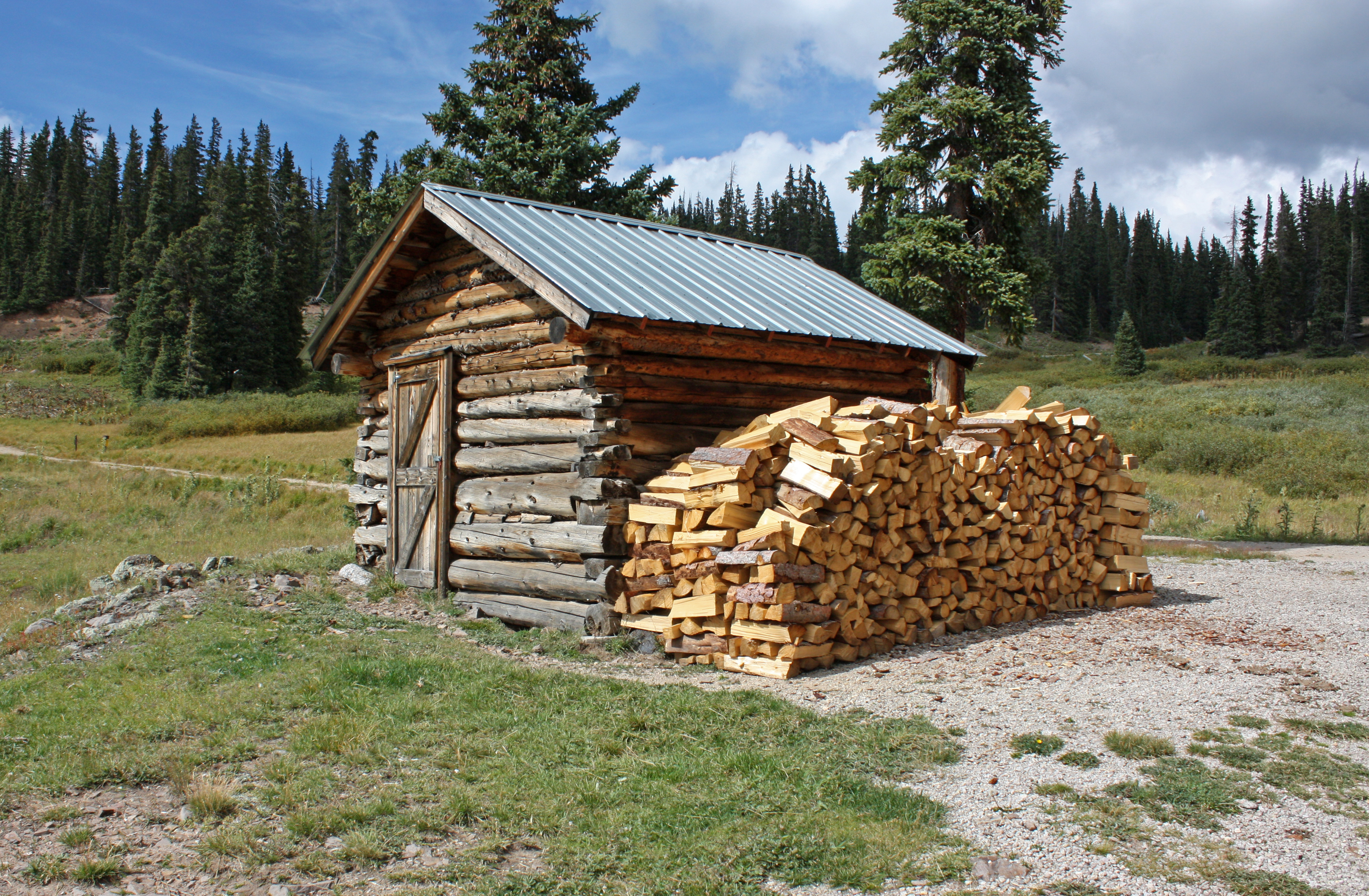
A wood shed located in the Rocky Mountains of Colorado.

These sheds are used for the storage of large quantities of firewood. Woodsheds help protect firewood from adverse weather and moisture, especially in snowy or wet climates. Woodsheds are commonly in close proximity to buildings heated by a wood-burning stove, such as a log cabin.

In the United States, "the woodshed" was the traditional location for parents to administer corporal punishment to children.

=== Miscellaneous ===
In the 19th century military barracks, sheds were used as auxiliary buildings for various purposes. The Royal Artillery park barracks in Halifax used sheds as gun sheds, carriage sheds, repair sheds, wheel sheds, wagon sheds and storage sheds.

== Construction ==
=== Small domestic ===
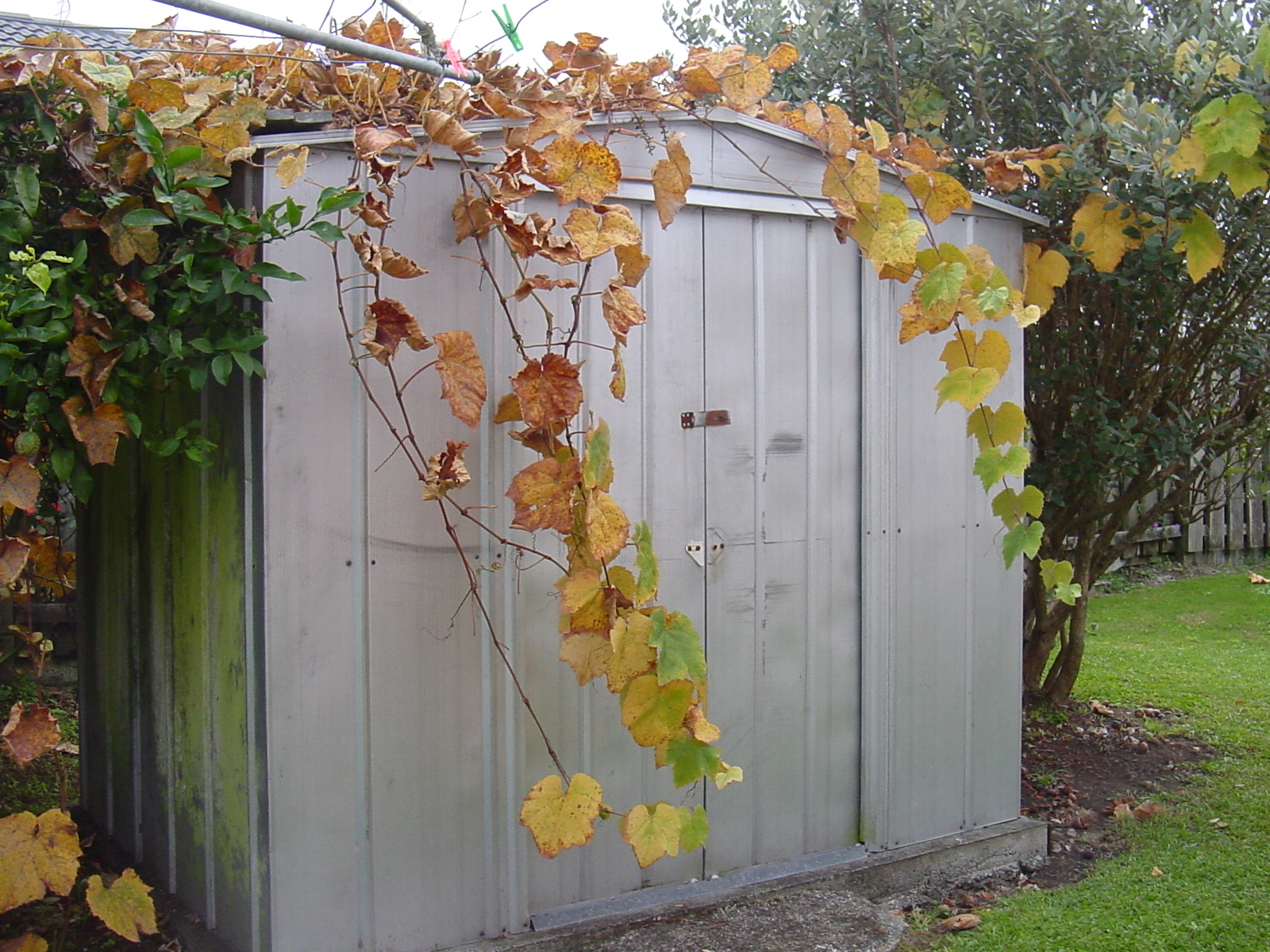
A metal garden shed made with sheets of galvanised steel over a steel frame

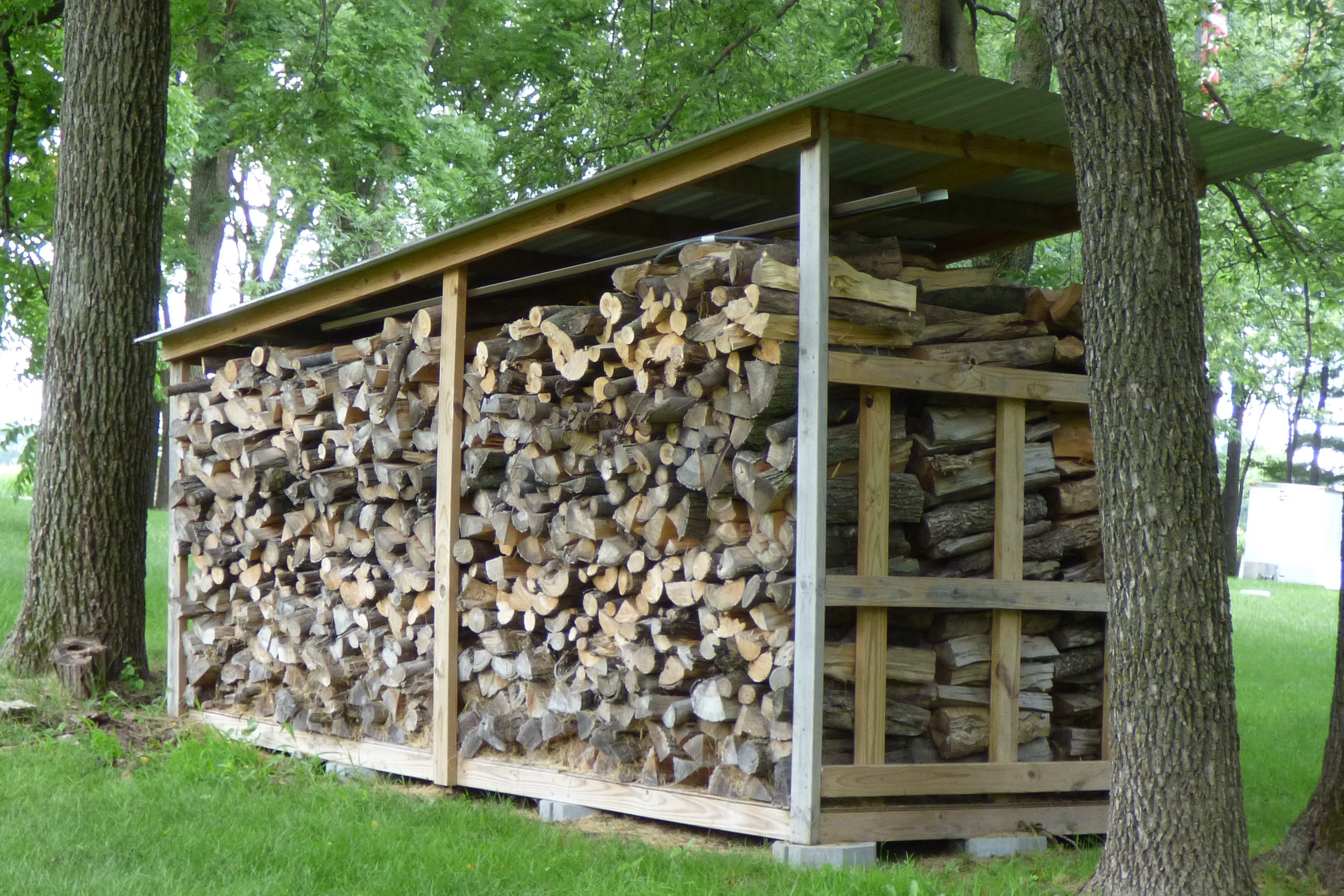
A wood shed with stacked firewood

The simplest and least-expensive sheds are available in kit form. These kits are designed for regular people to be able to assemble themselves using commonly available tools (e.g., screwdriver). Both shed kits and DIY (do-it-yourself) plans are available for wooden and plastic sheds. Sheds are used to store home and garden tools and equipment such as lawn tractors, and gardening supplies. In addition, sheds can be used to store items that are not suitable for indoor storage, such as petrol (gasoline), pesticides, or herbicides. For homes with small gardens or modest storage needs, there are several types of very small sheds. The sheds not only use less ground area but also have a low profile less likely to obstruct the view or clash with the landscaping.

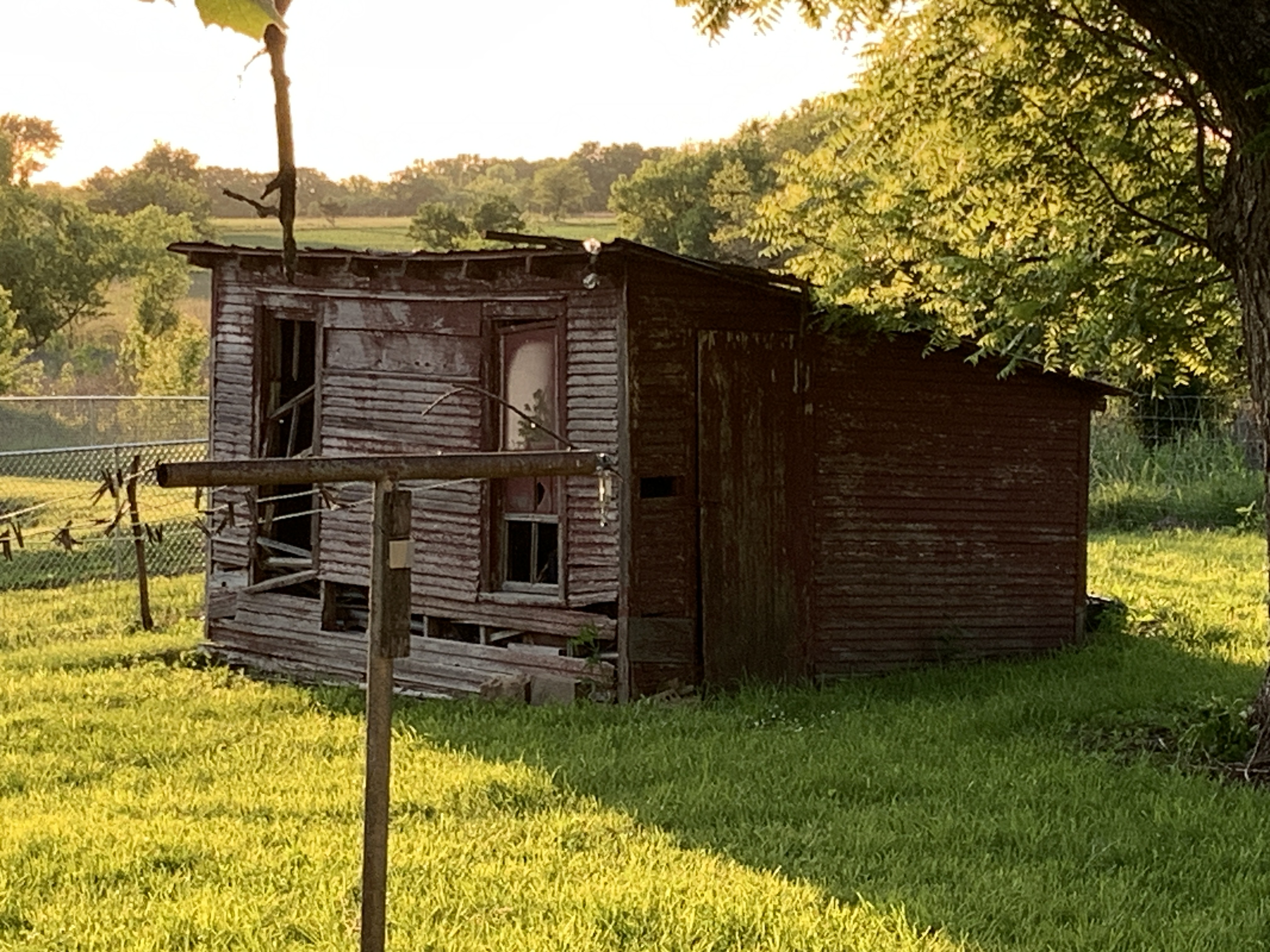
Old shed in Kansas

These small sheds include corner sheds, which fit into a corner (1 m × 1 m × 0.5 m or 3 ft × 3 ft × 2 ft—tall, wide, deep), vertical sheds (1.5 m × 1 m × 1 m deep, or 5 ft × 3 ft × 4 ft), horizontal sheds (1 m × 1.5 m × 1 m or 3 ft × 5 ft × 4 ft), and tool sheds. When a shed is used for tool storage, shelves and hooks are often used to maximise the storage space. Gambrel-style roofed sheds (sometimes called baby barns), which resemble a Dutch-style barn, have a high sloping roofline which increases storage space in the "loft" area. Some Gambrel-styles have no loft and offer the advantage of reduced overall height. Another style of small shed is the saltbox-style shed.

Many sheds have either a pent or apex roof shape. A pent shed features a single roof section that is angled downwards to let rainwater run off, with more headroom at the front than the back. This is a simple, practical design that will fit particularly well next to a wall or fence. It is also usually lower than the typical apex shed, so could be a better choice if there are any height restrictions. A pent shed may be free-standing or attached to a wall (when it is known, unsurprisingly, as a wall shed).

An apex shed has a pointed roof in an inverted V shape similar to the roofline of many houses. Two roof sections meet at a ridge in the middle, providing more headroom in the centre than at the sides. This type is generally regarded as a more attractive and traditional design and may be preferable if the shed is going to be visible from the house.

A twist on the standard apex shape is the reverse apex shed. In this design, the door is set in a side wall instead of the front. The main advantage of the reverse apex design is that the door opens into the widest part of the shed instead of the narrowest, so it is easier to reach into all areas to retrieve or store equipment.

=== Larger domestic ===
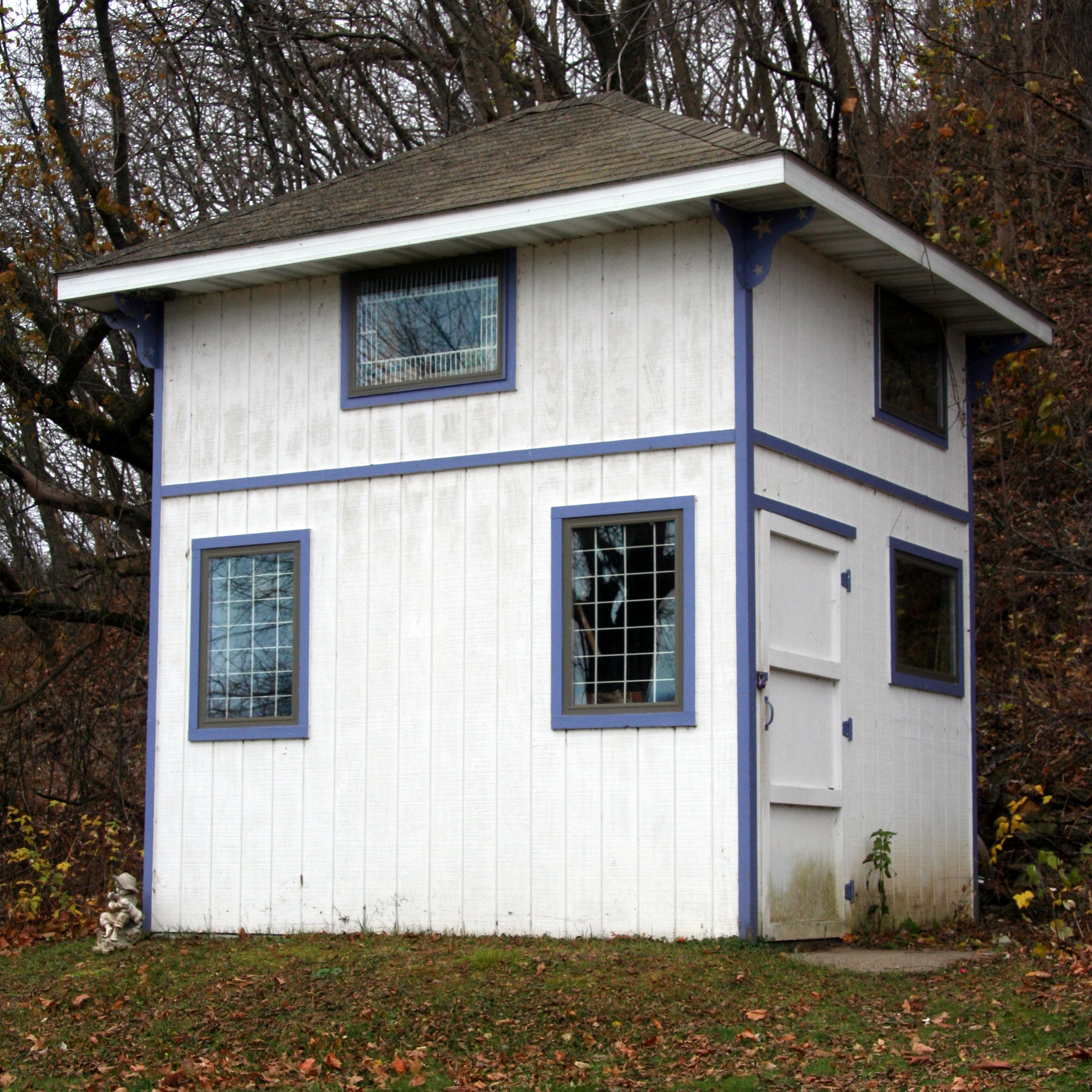
A tall shed with windows and a shingled roof

Larger, more-expensive sheds are typically constructed of wood and include features typically found in house construction, such as windows, a shingled roof, and electrical outlets. Larger sheds provide more space for engaging in hobbies such as gardening, small engine repair, or tinkering. Some sheds have small porches or include furniture, which allows them to be used for relaxation purposes. In some cases, remote workers who live in mild climates use small to medium-sized wooden garden sheds as outdoor offices. There is a growing industry in providing "off the peg" garden offices to cater to this demand, particularly in the UK but also in the US.

Shed owners can customise wooden sheds to match the features (e.g., siding, trim, etc.) of the main house. A number of decorative options can be added to sheds, such as dormers, shutters, flower boxes, finials, and weathervanes. As well, practical options can be added such as benches, ramps, ventilation systems (e.g., in cases where a swimming pool heater is installed in a shed), and electric lighting. Sheds designed for gardening, called "potting sheds", often feature windows or skylights for illumination, ventilation grilles, and a potter's bench for mixing soil and re-potting plants.

=== Materials ===
The main types of shed construction are metal sheathing over a metal frame, plastic sheathing and frame, all-wood construction (wood frame, wood siding and wood roof), and vinyl-sided sheds built over a wooden frame. Each type has various advantages and disadvantages that a homeowner has to consider. For example, while metal sheds are fire and termite-resistant, they can rust over time, or be severely damaged by high winds or heavy snow loads. Wood sheds are easier to modify or customise than plastic or metal because carpentry tools and basic carpentry skills are more readily available. Vinyl-sided, wood-framed sheds blend the strength of a wood frame with the maintenance-free aspect of vinyl siding (it does not need to be painted or varnished). The International Building Code (IBC) defines a shed as a building or structure of an accessory character; it classifies them under utility and miscellaneous group U (Chapter 3 Section 312).

==== Metal ====
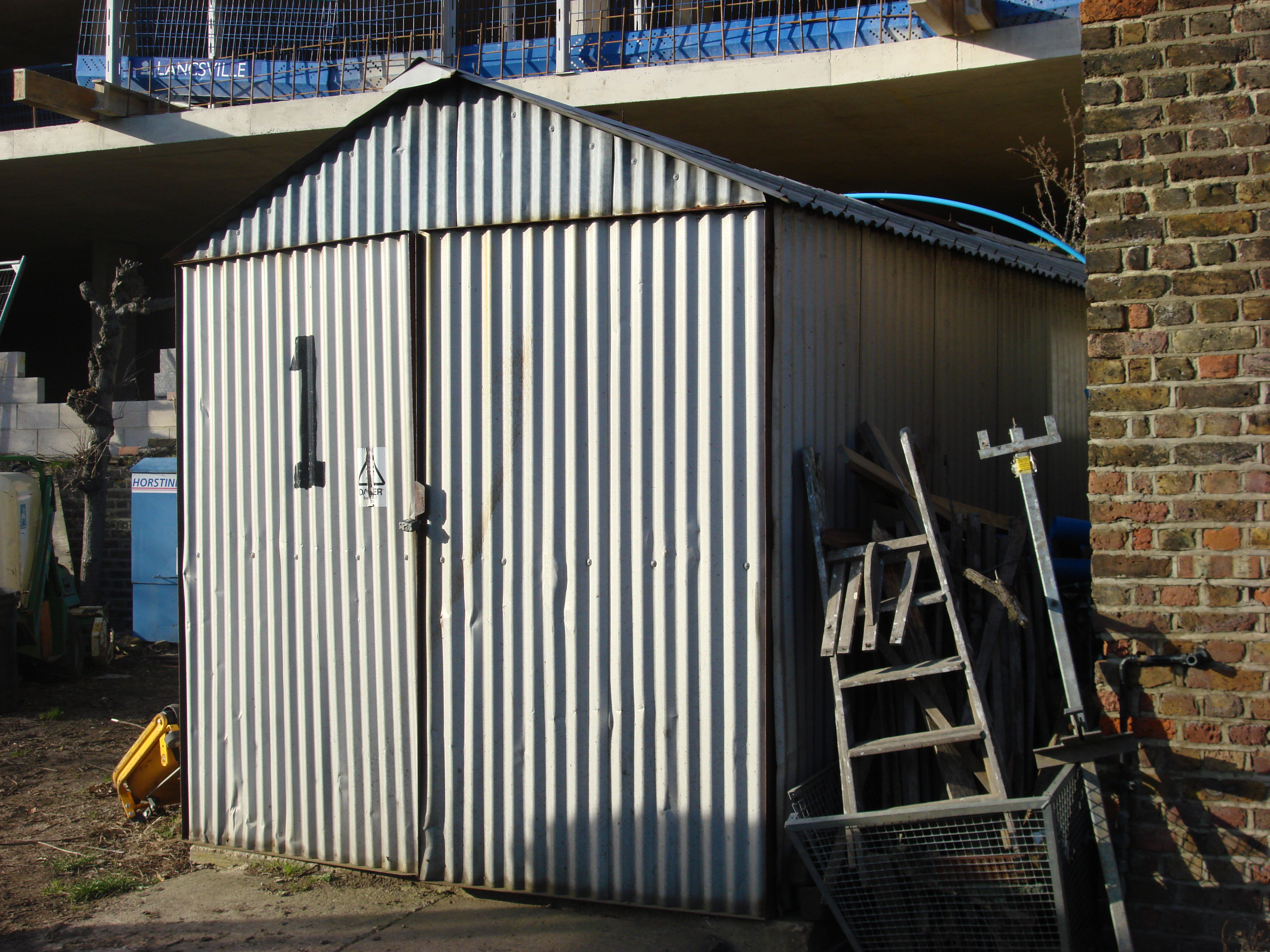
A corrugated iron shed

Metal sheds are made from thin sheet metal sheathing (galvanised steel, aluminium, or corrugated iron) attached to a metal frame. Metal sheds are more resilient against termites, weathering, and fire compared to other types of sheds. However, metal sheds may rust over time, particularly if they are constructed from non-galvanized steel. Due the fact concrete is highly corrosive, the sheets of most metal sheds are designed to avoid contact with concrete surfaces.

As well, some types of metal sheds that have thin walls are easily dented, which may make some types of thin metal sheds a poor choice for vandal-prone areas or for high-traffic activities such as small businesses. In cold climates, metal sheds with thin walls need to have snow and ice cleared from the roof, because the thin metal may be damaged by a heavy accumulation. Since thin metal sheds weigh much less than wood or PVC plastic sheds, thin metal sheds are more at risk of being damaged by heavy winds. To prevent wind damage, thin metal sheds should be attached to a concrete foundation with screws. In countries where the climate is generally mild, such as Australia, very large metal sheds are used for many types of industry. Corrugated metal sheds may be better able to withstand wind and snow loads, as the corrugated shape makes the metal stronger than flat tin.

==== Plastic ====
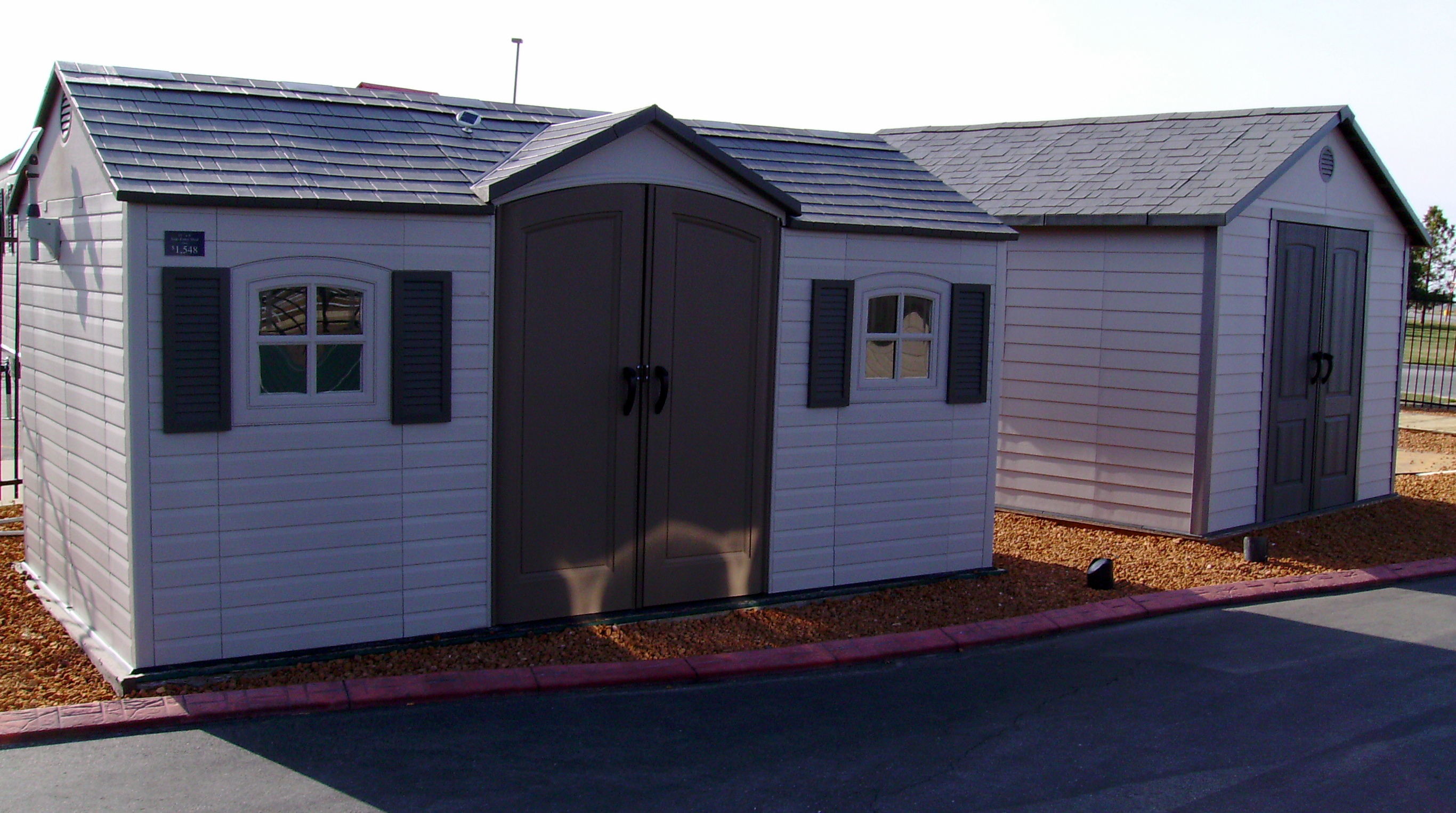
Lifetime brand blow-moulded plastic sheds

Plastic shed kits utilising heavy moulded plastics such as PVC and polyethylene may be less expensive than sheet-metal sheds. PVC resins and high-impact, UV light-resistant polyethylene make plastic outdoor sheds stronger, lighter, more durable, and more resistant to denting and chipping than wood, and tend to be more stable. Plastic shed kits sided with vinyl are typically among the least-expensive types of shed construction. Higher-quality sheds use UV-resistant plastic and powder-coated metal frames. Many plastic sheds are modular to allow for easy extensions, peg-boards, shelving, attic-storage, windows, skylights, and other accessories to be added later if these additions are purchased from the manufacturer.

Plastic sheds are not susceptible to termite or wood-boring insect damage, and they require little maintenance. Being rot-proof they do not need to have preservatives applied. This makes them preferable in climates where the weather can be changeable, such as the United Kingdom. Unlike wooden or metal sheds, which often require a permit to build, in many areas, plastic sheds do not. However, this is something property owners will need to verify. A call to your council/town's planning or building code office can provide information on permits.

==== Wood ====
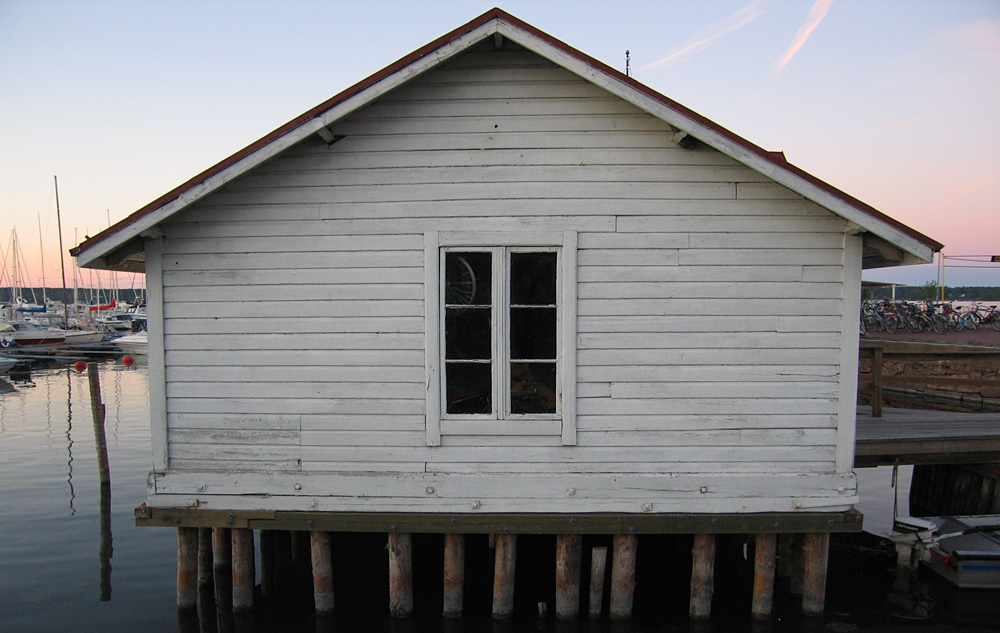
Wooden shed in Mariehamn, Åland, Finland

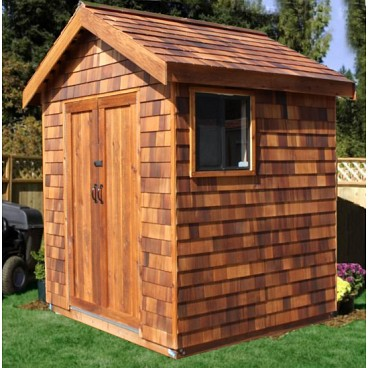
Cedar shed in U.S.

Wooden sheds are typically constructed in order to compliment a garden environment. Over time, untreated and neglected wood can rot, split, warp or become susceptible to mold and mildew. Wooden sheds are usually treated with stain and varnish, and require regular maintenance to prevent rotting over time. Debris pile-up, fire, in some regions, termite infestations are all issues relating to the use of wooden sheds.

Stains and preservatives can be applied to wood sheds to prevent damage to the wood caused by exposure to rain, damp ground, UV light, harsh climatic conditions, fungal attack and wood-boring insects. If a coloured preservative oil or stain is used, a wooden shed can either be made to stand out as a feature within a garden, or to blend in with its surroundings. Red cedar coloured stain is popular. Legislation such as the European Biocidal Products Regulation has reduced the number of effective active ingredients available for wood preservative formulations. For this reason, in recent years, there has been a greater emphasis on preserving wood by keeping it dry, for example through the application of water-repellent "wood protection creams."

Some types of wood, such as cedar, are more naturally resistant to water damage.

When looking for a wooden shed, it is important to understand the difference between the two types of preservative used in their manufacture. The timber will have been treated in one of two ways: dip treatment or pressure treatment. Dip-treated sheds are made from components that are lowered into a tank of preservatives before the panels are assembled. This is a quick and simple process that keeps costs down and encourages manufacturers to produce a wide variety, making dip-treated sheds the most popular and affordable type on the market. They are easily recognisable by their golden brown colour, which is due to a dye added to the preservative. Most manufacturers offer a 10-year anti-rot guarantee on dip-treated sheds, but they have to be re-coated every year or two.

Pressure-treated sheds are made from timber planks that have had the moisture sucked out of them under vacuum conditions in a special cylinder. A powerful preservative is then forced into the wood at high pressure until it is absorbed deep into the grain, becoming an integral part of the timber. This provides excellent protection against the weather—so much so that manufacturers generally give a 15-year anti-rot guarantee. These sheds are usually distinguished by a pale green tinge which will fade eventually to a silvery grey. Although pressure-treated sheds tend to be more expensive than dip-treated ones, their big advantage is that they will not need any further preservative treatment during the guarantee period, saving owners time and money.

One advantage of using wood sheds over metal versions is that it is easier to modify them by adding windows, doors, shelving, or exterior trim (etc.) because wood can be cut and drilled using commonly available tools, whereas a plastic or metal shed requires specialised tools. Some homeowners may prefer wood sheds because wood is a renewable resource.

==== Vinyl-sided ====
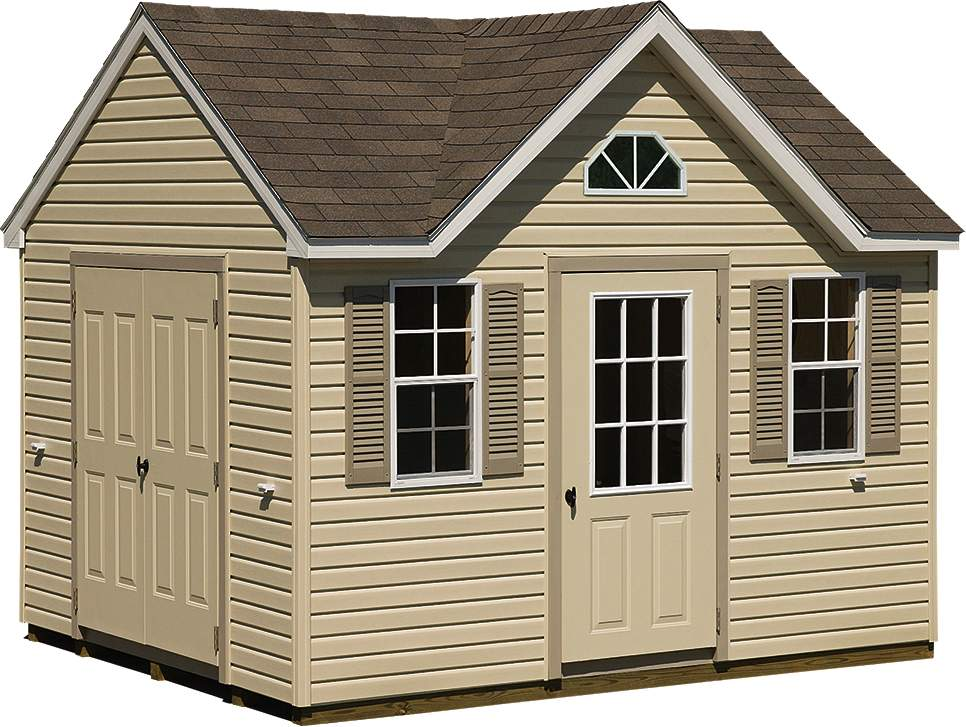
An Amish-style vinyl-sided shed

Vinyl-sided sheds are typically built with standard wood framing construction and oriented strand board (OSB) on the walls covered with standard vinyl siding. The vinyl siding protects the OSB wood and the frame from moisture from rain and snow. Vinyl-sided sheds never need to be painted, and are maintenance-free. They are stronger than plastic or metal sheds, and are usually built to conform with the local building codes. They offer good value for money because they hold up in all weather, including winters with heavy snowfall, as they use a strong wooden frame and the OSB panels have stronger structural support than thin metal or PVC siding or roofs. Metal, plastic and resin sheds are cheaper, but they cannot handle the weight of snow in winter (roofs may cave in). Vinyl sheds also offer more colour options.

==== Asbestos ====
In the early and middle years of the 20th century, many garden sheds and domestic garages were made of asbestos-cement sheets supported on a very light angle-iron frame. Concerns about safety led to the practice being discontinued, but they were cheap and long-lasting, and many can still be seen in British gardens. Advice on continued use or disposal is available.

== Culture ==
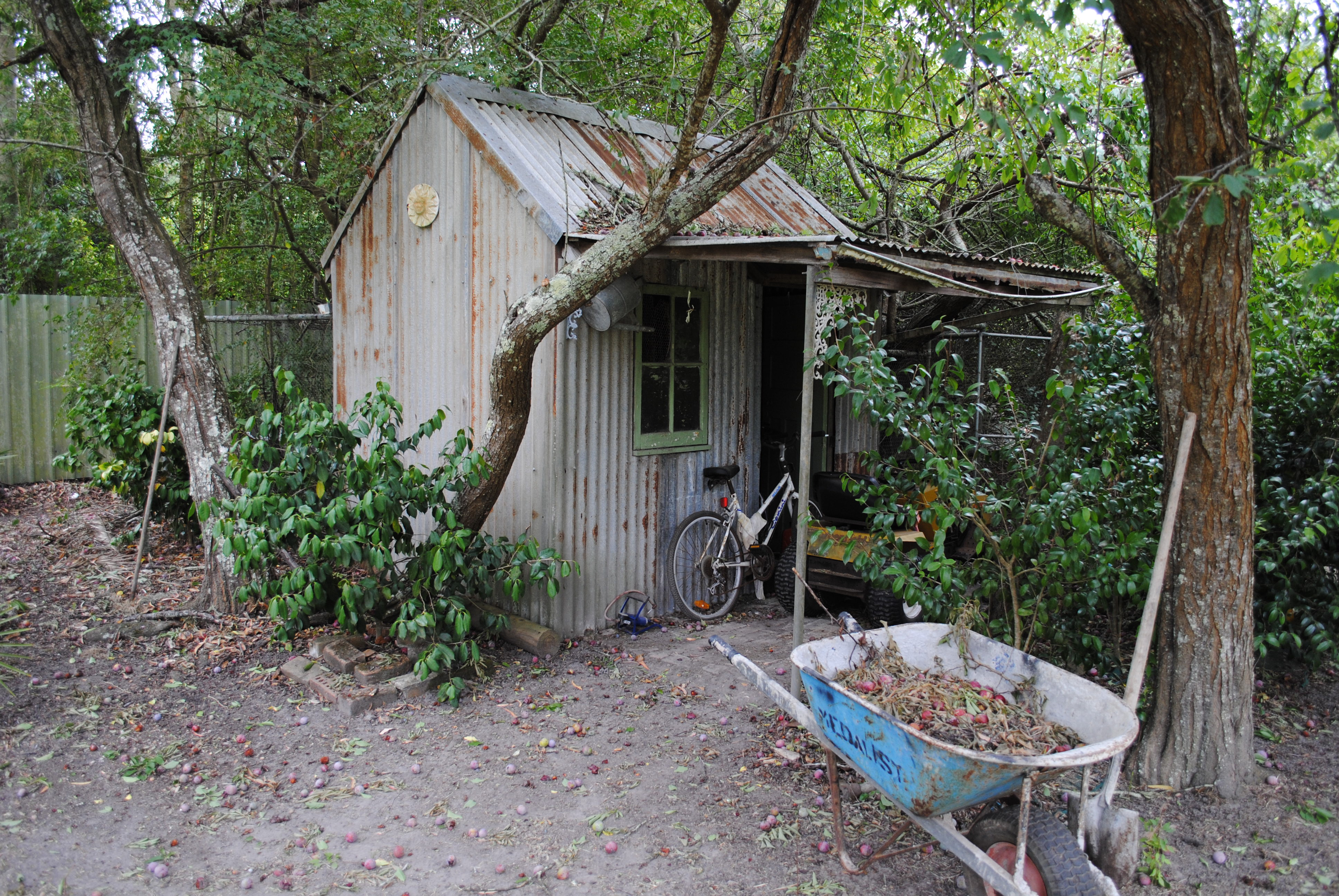
A shed near Sydney, Australia

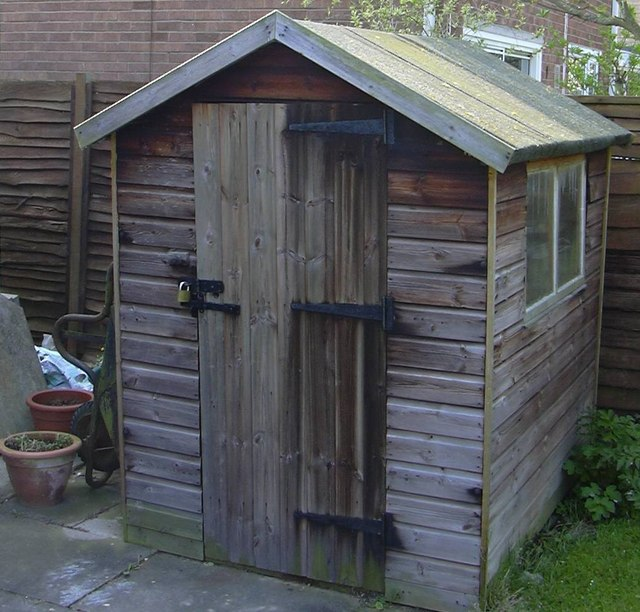
A frequently restored British shed in Lincolnshire

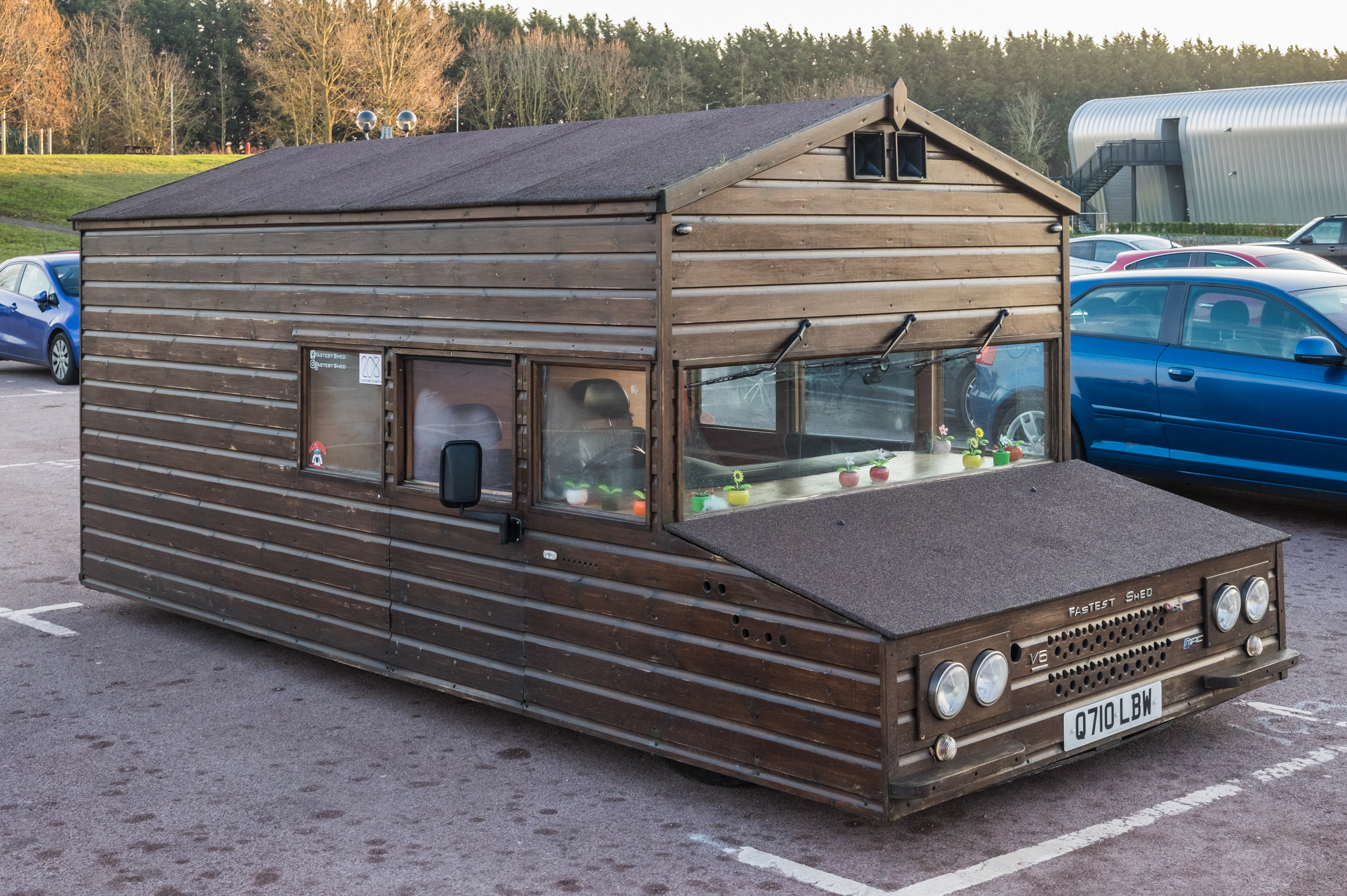
Fastest Shed, the world's fastest shed, in December 2018

In Australia and New Zealand the term shed can be used to refer to any building that is not a residence and which may be open at the ends or sides, or both. Australia's passion for sheds is documented in Mark Thomson's Blokes and Sheds (1998). Jim Hopkins' similarly titled Blokes & Sheds (1998), with photographer Julie Riley Hopkins, profiles amateur inventors from across New Zealand. Hopkins and Riley followed up that book with Inventions from the Shed (1999) and a 5-part film documentary series with the same name. Gordon Thorburn also examined the shed proclivity in his book Men and Sheds (2002), as did Gareth Jones in Shed Men (2004).

Recently, "Men's Sheds" have become common in Australia. In New Zealand, the bi-monthly magazine The Shed appeals to the culture of "blokes" who do woodwork or metalwork DIY projects in their sheds. The Australian Men's Shed Association is one organisation that has been set up involving sheds.

Another magazine called The Shed, a bi-monthly PDF magazine produced in the UK, but with a global audience, targets people who work (usually in creative industries) in garden offices, sheds and other shed-like atmospheres. In the UK, people have long enjoyed working in their potting sheds; the slang term "sheddie", refers to a person enamoured of shed-building, testifies to the place of sheds in the UK popular culture. The Usenet newsgroup "uk.rec.sheds" has long championed this subculture.

Since 2007 there has been a UK competition called Shed of the Year. Each year British sheddies enter their shed builds and after a short list is produced (including Pub Sheds, Eco Sheds, Workshops & unexpected categories), a public vote helps to decide the ultimate Shed, it also featured on Channel 4 television as George Clarke's Amazing Spaces: Shed of the Year, for four series (with host George Clarke)

In the United States, Shed Builder Magazine is a bimonthly magazine dedicated to the builders, dealers, and manufacturers within the shed industry. The magazine owns and manages Shed Builder Expo, a yearly, two-day conference for the shed industry.

Author Gordon Thorburn examined the shed proclivity in his book Men and Sheds, which argues that a "place of retreat" is a "male necessity" which provides men with solace, especially during their retirement. In contrast, in the novel Cold Comfort Farm by Stella Gibbons, Aunt Ada Doom saw "something nasty in the woodshed" and retreated to her bed for half a century.

To woodshed, or 'shed, in jazz jargon, is "to shut oneself up, away from the world, and practice long and hard, as in 'going to the woodshed'."

A shed built onto the chassis of an old car, and called Fastest Shed, is legally roadworthy in the UK, and holds the world speed record for sheds.

== See also ==
- Anderson shelter
- Lean-to
- Nissen hut
- Shanty town
- Shipping_container#Re-use
- Tuff Shed
- Wendy house
