= Edd China =

British motor specialist and television presenter (born 1971)

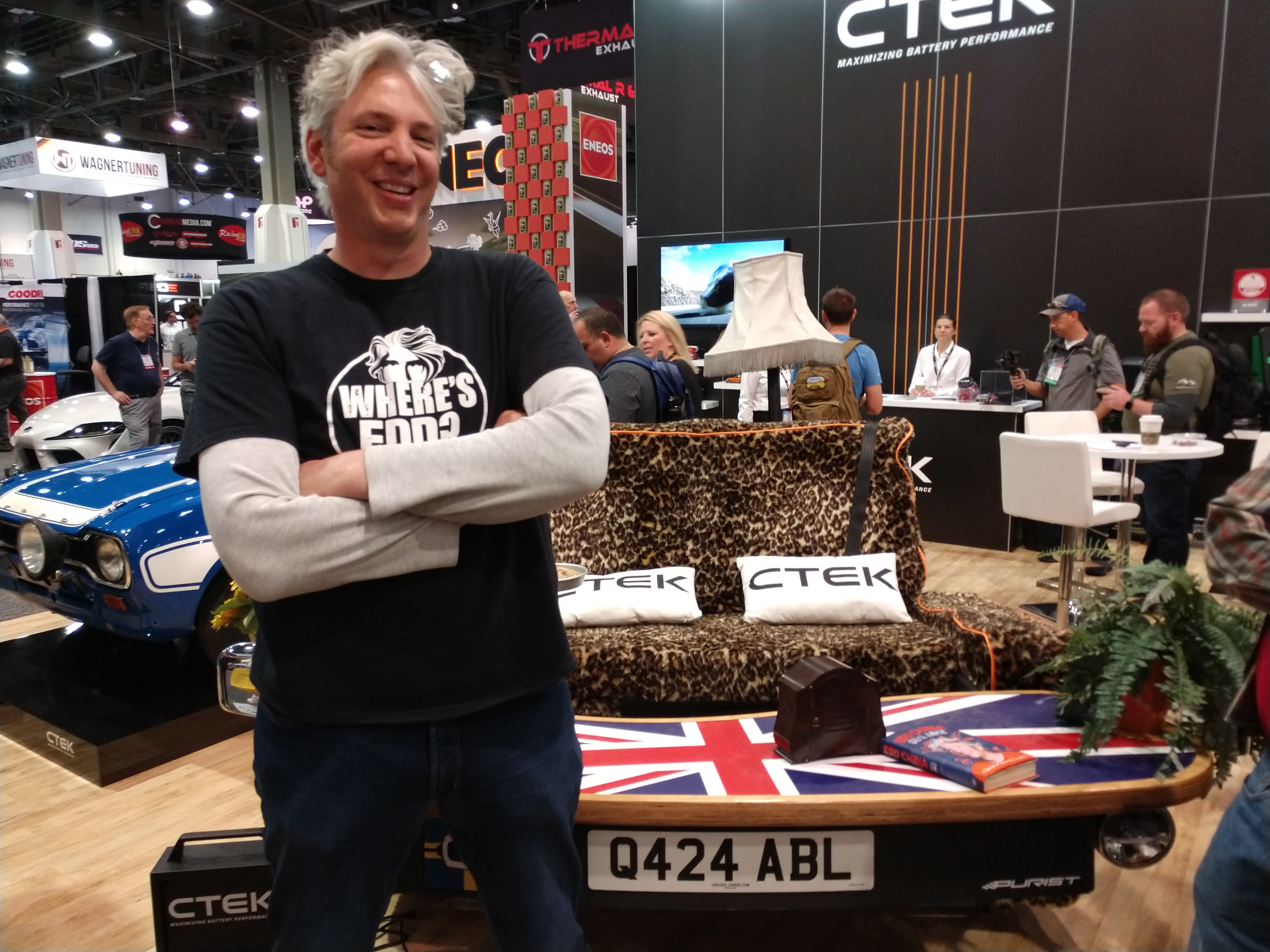
- Edd China with the Casual Lofa at SEMA 2019
- Born: Edward John China; 9 May 1971 (age 55); London, England
- Education: London South Bank University
- Occupations: Television presenter; inventor; mechanic
- Known for: Wheeler Dealers
- Spouse: Imogen China
- Website: www.eddchina.com

Edward John China (born 9 May 1971) is an English television presenter, mechanic, motor specialist and inventor, best known as being presenter and mechanic on Discovery Channel's television show Wheeler Dealers. He has also appeared on Top Gear, Auto Trader, Scrapheap Challenge and Fifth Gear.

== Early life ==
China developed an interest in cars and mechanics from an early age. He was educated at King Edward's School, Witley in Surrey, and he holds a degree in engineering product design from London South Bank University. While at university, China created the Casual Lofa (driving sofa), his first major project. It was built to raise money for a Raleigh International expedition to Belize.

== Television career ==
Following the success of his creation of the Casual Lofa, China's first job in television was as a special effects technician for Father Ted in 1994. In 1998, China appeared as a guest on Top Gear Live, driving the Casual Lofa at the Silverstone 'Live Arena'.

The same year, China and the Casual Lofa were also featured on Jeremy Clarkson's DVD The Most Outrageous Jeremy Clarkson Video In The World.... Ever!, where the Casual Lofa was raced at the Thruxton Circuit, in a manner similar to Wacky Races. China was also featured on Channel 4's The Big Breakfast three times over the years, driving the Casual Lofa, Bog Standard and Street Sleeper.

China was a guest on Scrapheap Challenge (known as Junkyard Wars in the United States) in an episode featuring driving beds and sofa cars. In the same year, China was featured in an episode of the television show This Is Your Life featuring Madness front man Suggs. China drove presenter Michael Aspel around old haunts, and delivered Aspel to the television studios on the Casual Lofa.

China was resident designer on the BBC series Panic Mechanics a year later, and was also a guest on Top Gear feature "Build a Bond Car On A Budget", where he showcased a Rover 800 (purchased for £200) that had been modified with budget Bond-esque gadgets, such as an ejection seat, for just £100.

In 2005, China was a celebrity guest on BBC's Ready Steady Cook, for a Children in Need Special. He also co-hosted the short lived Auto Trader television series alongside Brewer. The series was screened by Discovery Channel.

China was a guest in 2007 on The Culture Show, being interviewed and driving Arthur Smith and various other performers around the Edinburgh Festival.

He, along with Penny Mallory, Tony Mason and Alex Riley, presented a television miniseries for the United Kingdom that examined the history and culture of classic cars, geared toward classic car enthusiasts, and called Classic Car Club for Discovery Channel, which premiered in 2005.

=== Wheeler Dealers ===
China was hired by Discovery Channel and paired with television presenter Mike Brewer in 2003 specifically to make a new car programme: Wheeler Dealers. It became both China's and Brewer's most famous television work to date, and they presented the show together for 13 series, from 2003 to 2017. On 21 March 2017, China announced on his YouTube channel that he was departing Wheeler Dealers owing to disagreements over the direction of the programme. Six days later, in another video, China described how Brewer had telephoned him over the weekend saying that he, his wife and his daughter, were receiving significant online abuse, including death threats, because of China's leaving the show.

== Business career ==
=== Cummfy Banana ===
Following the success of his creations as a special effects technician on the comedy television programme Father Ted, China set up Cummfy Banana Limited, in March 1999, as an outlet for his extreme creations. In 2001, China was interviewed about Cummfy Banana's vehicles on ITV's Pulling Power. In 2006, he was interviewed on ITV's This Morning about his Cummfy Banana vehicles.

=== Grease Junkie ===
In 2009, China incorporated Grease Junkie Limited (whose website sells Wheeler Dealers and Grease Junkie merchandise) and became managing director. China owned an MOT and servicing garage in Bracknell, Berkshire, called Grease Junkie, which was voluntarily liquidated in August 2016.

== Internet presence ==
On 1 May 2018, China premiered his new series, Edd China's Garage Revival, on his YouTube channel. China uploads more regularly to his Edd China YouTube channel, which has videos following his notable exploits post-Wheeler Dealers. He answers questions from fans on the channel in the AskEdd series. In April 2021, "Edd China's Workshop Diaries" premiered on Edd's personal YouTube channel, showing various projects in his personal Workshop.

== World record attempts ==
China holds the Guinness World Record titles for the fastest toilet, bed, milk float and the largest motorised shopping trolley, among other things. He held the record for fastest shed between 2011 and 2017 before being surpassed by Fastest Shed.

In 2007, owing to his record attempts, China was featured in a number of programmes, including Fifth Gear, Pulling Power and This Morning, showcasing his creations.

In 2012, China, and driver from the BTCC, Tom Onslow-Cole, were part of an eBay sponsored challenge, to convert a milk float into a drag racer, which then achieved a place in the Guinness World Records, for the world's fastest milk float.

Date	Description	Record	Status
October 1998	Fastest furniture.	140 km/h; 87 mph	Broken by China himself (11 May 2007)
9 November 2005	Largest motorised shopping trolley, "Trolleyshoppus Rex"	2,99 × 1,80 × 3,47 m; 9,8 × 5,9 × 11,4 ft (l×w×h)	Record
9 November 2006	Fastest office, "Hot Desk"	140 km/h; 87 mph	Record
11 May 2007	Fastest furniture.	148 km/h; 92 mph	Broken by Perry Watkins (5 September 2010)
7 November 2008	Fastest mobile bed, "‘Street Sleeper"	111 km/h; 69 mph	Record
10 March 2011	Fastest motorized bathroom, "Bog Standard"	68 km/h; 42.25 mph	Record
11 April 2011	Fastest garden shed, "'Gone to Speed"	94 km/h; 58.41 mph	Broken by Kevin Nicks in Fastest Shed, recording 129.831 km/h (80.673 mph) in Yorkshire on 16 September 2017
March 2020	Fastest electric Ice Cream Van	118.964 km/h; 73.921 mph	Record

== Personal life ==
China is married to Norwegian born Imogen China.

== Filmography ==
=== Television ===
Year	Title	Role	Channel
1994	Father Ted	Special effects technician	Channel 4
1998	Scrapheap Challenge	Judge	Channel 4
2002	Fifth Gear	Himself	Channel 5
2002	Top Gear	Himself	BBC Two
2003–2017	Wheeler Dealers	Presenter	Discovery Channel
2006	Auto Trader	Presenter	Discovery Channel

== Published works ==
- Wheeler Dealers Car Restoration Manual, Haynes Publishing UK, 2015, ISBN 9780857337986
- Grease Junkie: Tall Stories and Wheel Adventures, Penguin Random House, 2019
- Grease Junkie: A Book of Moving Parts, Virgin Books, 2019, ISBN 9780753553541
