= Fastest Shed =

Motorised shed

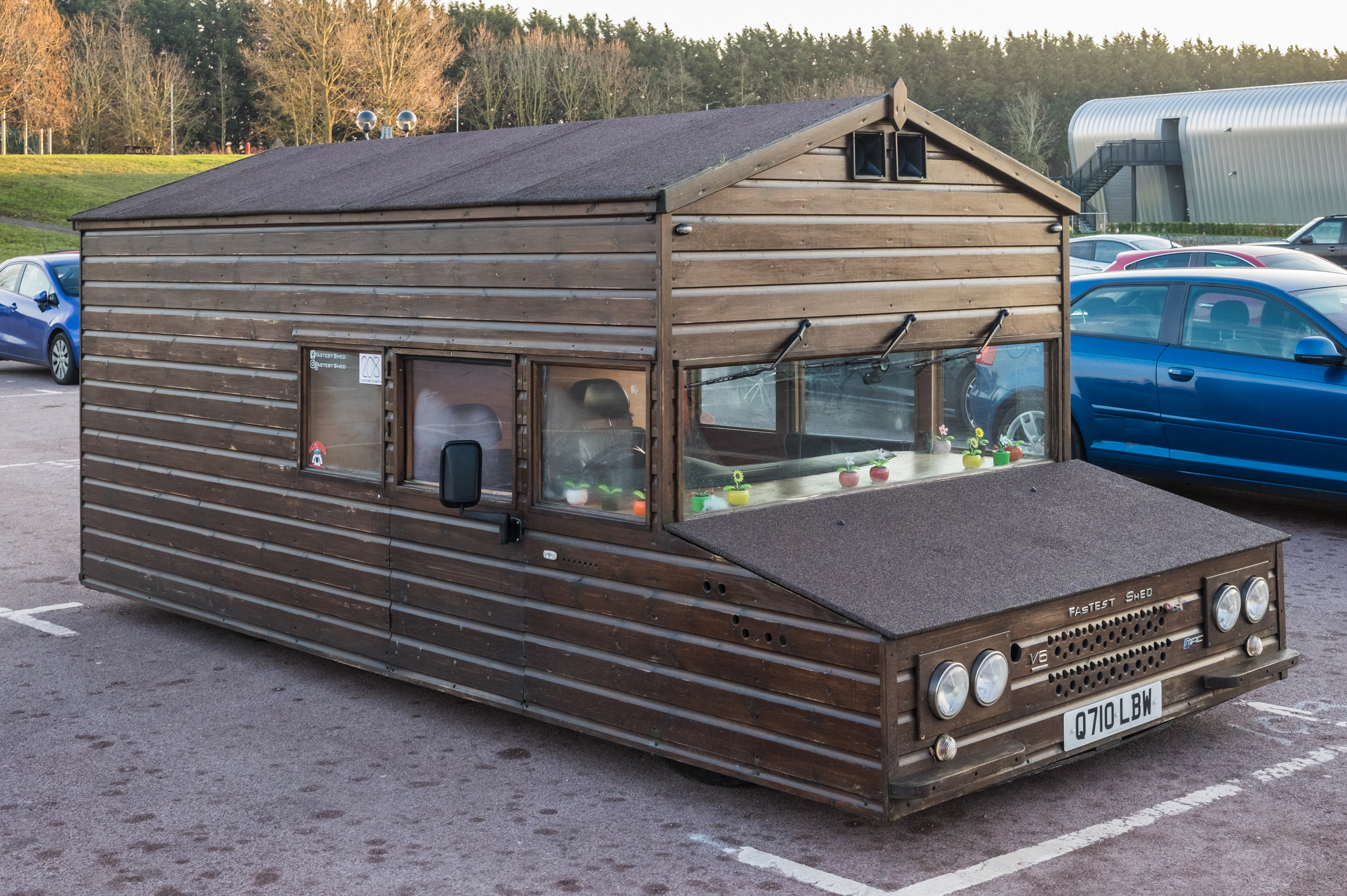
Fastest Shed in December 2018

Fastest Shed is a motorised shed designed and built by Kevin Nicks of Great Rollright, Chipping Norton, Oxfordshire, United Kingdom. The vehicle has been used to break the world land speed record for sheds three times since it was built in 2015. The most recent record was a speed of 114.7 mph (184.6 km/h) set on 23 September 2018 at Pendine Sands in Wales.

== Design and manufacture ==
Kevin Nicks, a mechanic and gardener from Chipping Norton in Oxfordshire, United Kingdom came up with the idea of building the unusual vehicle in 2015, as a way of making use of a broken-down Volkswagen Passat he had in his garden. His original focus was to use the Shed for advertising - believing that major organisations would be interested in using a car covered in wood as a replacement for an online marketing strategy. Nicks took twelve months to build the steel frame and wooden shiplap bodywork, install the engine and to make the vehicle roadworthy. The total expenditure for the vehicle was about £50,000. After damaging the engine whilst running Fastest Shed at various speed trials, during which time he set the shed world speed record at 80 mph (130 km/h), Nicks spent another two years and £80,000 fitting Fastest Shed with a new suspension system and a more powerful Audi RS4 engine. In May 2018, Nicks broke his own record, achieving a speed of 101.046 mph (162.618 km/h).

== Trials and events ==
In mid 2017, Nicks drove Fastest Shed from Land's End to John O'Groats to raise funds for a hospice charity. Nicks broke this trip at Elvington airfield to attempt a 100 mph (160 km/h) run, but the vehicle only achieved a maximum of 96 mph (154 km/h) on this occasion. A few days after arriving in John O'Groats, Nicks embarked on the North Coast 500 route around the coast of Scotland, which he completed in 12 hours.

== World records ==
On 16 September 2017, Nicks set his first shed world speed record. He broke the previous record of 58 mph (94 km/h) held by Edd China, by achieving a speed of 80.673 mph (129.831 km/h) at Elvington airfield, Yorkshire.

On 12 May 2018, Fastest Shed broke its first record on Pendine Sands, Carmarthenshire, Wales, with a recorded speed of 101.046 mph (162.618 km/h).

Fastest Shed broke the record for the third time, surpassing its previous record by a narrow margin, recording a speed of 101.581 mph (163.479 km/h), again on Pendine Sands, at the Straightliners "Top Speed" event on 23 September 2018.

== Technical details ==
Fastest Shed's original build was based on a Volkswagen Passat 4Motion, including its 190 bhp (140 kW) engine. Later, the engine power was increased to 265 bhp (198 kW) by fitting it with a nitrous oxide injection kit. For the September 2018 record attempt, the vehicle was fitted with a 400 bhp (300 kW) Audi RS4 (B5) engine. In an interview with Car Throttle, which aired on YouTube, Nicks has confirmed he changed the engine, replacing the existing B5 generation engine with an engine used in the B7 generation RS4, producing 455 bhp (339 kW). It is also fitted with hydraulic suspension.

== World's Fastest Shed ==
While known as the Fastest Shed, the actual fastest shed belongs to Brian Cade, who built and owns 'Ed the Shed', a Guinness World Record-holding shed that reached a speed of 123 mph (198 km/h) at Elvington Airfield in Yorkshire on Sunday 12th October 2025.
