= Outhouse (disambiguation) =

An outhouse is a small structure containing a simple toilet.

Outhouse may also refer to:

- Outhouse (unit), a unit of area in nuclear and particle physics
- The Outhouse (venue), a former music venue near Lawrence, Kansas, United States
- The Outhouse, a Canadian television series about home improvement
- The Outhouse (comedy group), a Canadian sketch troupe
- The Outhouse (film), a 1997 Indian English-language drama
- The OUTHouse, a New Zealand talkshow dealing with lesbian and gay issues
- John Outhouse (1828–1889), American schoolteacher

== See also ==
- Outhouse Classic, a building race in Michigan, USA
