= Wheeler Dealers =

British TV series

- Series 14 title card
- Created by: Daniel Allum; Michael Wood
- Presented by: Mike Brewer (Series 1-18) (2003-2023); Edd China (Series 1–13) (2003–2017); Ant Anstead (Series 14–16) (2017–2021); Marc Priestley (Series 17-18) (2021-2023)
- Theme music composer: The Wideboys
- Opening theme: "Balaclava"
- Country of origin: United Kingdom
- No. of series: 18 (Wheeler Dealers); 2 (Trading Up)
- No. of episodes: 269 + 12 specials (list of episodes)

Production
- Running time: 30 minutes (Series 1–6); 60 minutes (Series 7-18)
- Production companies: Attaboy TV (Series 1–12); Discovery Studios

Original release
- Network: Discovery Real Time (2003–2010); Discovery Channel (2011–2023); Motor Trend (2016–2023)
- Release: 7 October 2003 – 25 December 2023

Wheeler Dealers is a British TV series originally produced by Attaboy TV for the Discovery Channel in the United Kingdom and for Motor Trend in the United States. The programme was fronted by car enthusiast and former dealer Mike Brewer with mechanics Edd China (Series 1-13), Ant Anstead (Series 14–16), and Marc Priestley, (Series 17-18). The premise of the show has the presenters on a mission to save old and repairable enthusiast vehicles, by repairing or otherwise improving an example of a particular make and model to a budget then selling it to a new owner.

The programme was created by Daniel Allum and Michael Wood, the founding directors of Attaboy TV, both long-time car enthusiasts.

Series 1 was aired in 2003. Series 5 was renamed Wheeler Dealers On the Road, with Brewer and China expanding their car search by heading out into Europe hoping to find classic cars to buy and restore. The second half of Series 6 was aired in the autumn of 2009 on Discovery Real Time.

Beginning with part 2 of Series 8, Brewer further expanded their horizon by touring the United States. In Series 12, Brewer and China set up a new workshop in a rented bay at Huntington Beach Bodyworks, 18108 Redondo Circle, Huntington Beach, California. This decision was made so that they could deliver more episodes of the show and meant they were able to restore and sell the cars on the spot, instead of having them shipped back to the UK. Once the American operation was established, it moved to more suitable premises at 5382 Research Drive, Huntington Beach. Series 17 (2021) saw the show filming return to the UK.

Wheeler Dealers has spawned a number of derived series such as Wheeler Dealers: Trading Up in which Brewer travels around the world attempting to trade his way up to a supercar, Wheeler Dealers: Dream Car where Brewer and mechanic Marc "Elvis" Priestley lend their expertise to add value to clients' cars to help them trade up to their dream vehicle, and most recently Wheeler Dealers World Tour.

== Format ==
In each episode, Brewer buys a vehicle, turns it over to his mechanic for repairs, then sells it. For the first series, the budget was £1,000, for series 2, £2,000, and for series 3, £3,000. Budgets in subsequent series have varied, depending on the target vehicle. For example, a £10,000 budget was set on buying and restoring a Ferrari Dino 308 GT4 in series 6. For series 11 (2014), the budget is listed on the show's Discovery UK website as "up to £20,000". The presentation for each project usually follows a similar TV format. Through series 6, the project was presented in two 30-minute episodes. Starting with series 7, the format was changed to single 60 minute (including commercials) episodes.

=== Summary ===
The programme was created with a DIYer in mind. The costs, and thus any profit or loss for a given project, are assessed without consideration of the labour costs of the mechanic (the assumption is that a well-equipped and able enthusiast could complete all work him or herself) but if repairs require professional help, like body resprays, complicated electronics, or windscreen replacements, they are added to the final cost.

Also addressed on each vehicle are its service history, bodywork defects (e.g. rust, dents), worn-out interiors and accessories. Vehicles that have either been inactive for long periods of time or purchased from outside the UK are restored and modified to pass the country's mandatory MOT test.

In common with most similar programmes, Wheeler Dealers features much incidental on-screen advertising. Logos for tools, supplies and equipment are always prominently displayed. Specialist repairers of parts and sub-systems, along with upholsterers, etc. always get adequate coverage in return for favourable price deals. Sometimes, parts and equipment are supplied free of charge.

=== Part one ===
- Brewer starts with a budget to buy and then fix up a vehicle.
- Brewer gives a brief history of the merits of the chosen model of vehicle.
- Brewer locates, test drives, negotiates for and buys the vehicle (usually sealed with a handshake and Brewer triumphantly expressing to camera that he's just bought a <name of vehicle>).
- (Starting from series 5, prospective cars Brewer wanted to buy, but needed too much work, were shown. This also took place in Series 1, Episode 7).
- Brewer turns the vehicle over to the mechanic, and together they assess its needs.
- The mechanic begins work, providing assessments of the work and its challenges.
- Brewer stops by the workshop for an overview of progress, and expenditures are reviewed.

=== Part two ===
- A quick review of the first episode (for series where each project is split into two episodes).
- Brewer goes on a field trip to procure some required parts.
- Brewer interviews an owner of a similar vehicle in top condition, then drives and comments on the car. Brewer also assesses the merit and likelihood of getting the Wheeler Dealers example to the same condition as the example he is driving. (This feature was dropped from series 5 onwards)
- The mechanic finishes the work on the project vehicle which is subsequently shown on a revolving turntable.
- Brewer returns to the workshop and discusses the finished vehicle with the mechanic.
- There is a final tally of expenditures.
- Brewer drives the completed car, assessing improvements.
- (Starting from series 5, Brewer and the mechanic test drive the finished vehicle together and discuss its resale value.)
- Brewer sells the vehicle to a new owner (after the inevitable haggling). (Starting from series 5, prospective buyers who failed to buy the car are occasionally shown)
- The deal is sealed when Brewer says, "Hold out your hand, you've just bought a <name of vehicle>!" and shakes the new buyer's hand.
- Brewer summarises what the final selling price and profit is (or in rare instances what the loss is) and usually states that they have saved another vehicle to be enjoyed by the new owner.

However, in interviews, following his leaving the show, Edd China has hinted at, at least, some of the sales not having been 'real.' He stated that he, himself, had possession of both of the Cadillacs from the show.

== Cast ==
Mike Brewer uses his skills as a car trader to scout and buy used cars to be restored and sold for profit. He's also responsible for procuring replacement parts and sometimes specialists to refurbish expensive parts.

Edd China was credited as the show's co-presenter, from series 1 to 13 doing much of the restoration and mechanical/servicing work, and giving viewers tips on how to sort out and solve various car problems, as well as estimating how much a garage would charge for such repairs. There were, however, always two other mechanics credited.

On 21 March 2017, Velocity announced that China had left the show to "pursue other projects" and that he would be replaced by Ant Anstead in series 14. China explained that he chose to leave because he was disagreeing with the channel, which wanted to cut down his fixes and degree of technical information delivered in the workshop.

On 2 November 2020, it was announced that Marc "Elvis" Priestley would replace Anstead as the main mechanic of the show from Series 17, when it returns to the UK after six years filming in the U.S. However, Anstead will appear occasionally as a special guest.

Since series 13, the programme has been produced by Discovery Studios (replacing Attaboy TV that had produced the 12 previous seasons), for Motor Trend.

=== Guest appearances on other shows ===
While buying more American cars for the show, Brewer dropped in on Chip Foose during the 2 June 2013 (Lotus Europa part 2, episode #91, s06e12) of Overhaulin, where Foose showed Brewer the 1972 Lotus Europa he was customising.

== Theme music ==
Throughout the 18 series of the programme broadcast so far, three different theme tunes have been used; the current one being "Balaclava" by the Wideboys.

The previous theme was from V-The Production Library by Music 4.

== Spin offs ==
In April 2013 a spinoff series titled Wheeler Dealers: Trading Up was launched. This series was produced by X2 Productions Ltd and has Brewer travelling around the world to buy and sell –but not repair or restore– used cars in different countries with the aim of ultimately purchasing a supercar. In the first season he began with $3,000 and traded his way up to a Porsche 911. The series was recommissioned by Discovery Channel International for a second season where Brewer ended up buying a Ferrari.

Wheeler Dealers: Trading Up
- Presented by: Mike Brewer
- Country of origin: United Kingdom
- No. of series: 2
- No. of episodes: 12

Production
- Running time: 60 minutes
- Production company: X2 Productions Ltd

Original release
- Network: Discovery Channel
- Release: 2 April 2013 – 24 November 2014

A second spinoff series titled Wheeler Dealers: Dream Car premiered in January 2020, with Brewer and mechanic Marc "Elvis" Priestley lending their expertise to add value to clients' cars helping them trade up to their dream vehicle.

Wheeler Dealers: Dream Car
- Presented by: Mike Brewer
- Country of origin: United Kingdom
- No. of series: 2
- No. of episodes: 18

Production
- Running time: 60 minutes
- Production company: Betty TV

Original release
- Network: Discovery Channel
- Release: 6 January 2020 – 30 May 2022

In 2024, a third spinoff series was released, dubbed Wheeler Dealers World Tour. It premiered in May 2024, with Brewer and mechanic Marc "Elvis" Priestley travelling around the world to source for cars that they are going to restore and sell.

Wheeler Dealers: World Tour
- Presented by: Mike Brewer
- Country of origin: United Kingdom
- No. of series: 3
- No. of episodes: 23

Production
- Running time: 60 minutes
- Production company: Objective Media Group

Original release
- Network: Discovery Channel
- Release: 29 April 2024 – present

== Episodes ==
=== Wheeler Dealers ===
As of 25 December 2023 269 episodes have been shown, along with 12 recap episodes. For series 1 to 6, each car was covered in two, half-hour episodes (including ad breaks). From series 7 until series 18, each car was covered in a single 60-minute episode.

| Series | Episodes | Originally released | |
| Series | Episodes | First released | Last released |
|---|---|---|---|
| 1 | 12 | 7 October 2003 | 11 November 2003 |
| 2 | 12 | 10 August 2004 | 16 September 2004 |
| 3 | 12 | 23 August 2005 | 27 September 2005 |
| 4 | 12 | 29 August 2006 | 3 October 2006 |
| 5 | 12 | 28 October 2008 | 6 December 2008 |
| 6 | 20 | 5 May 2009 | 17 November 2009 |
| 7 | 10 | 4 May 2010 | 9 November 2010 |
| 8 | 10 | 5 April 2011 | 1 November 2011 |
| 9 | 15 | 20 March 2012 | 6 November 2012 |
| 10 | 12 | 19 February 2013 | 22 October 2013 |
| 11 | 14 | 17 March 2014 | 13 October 2014 |
| 12 | 18 | 23 March 2015 | 19 October 2015 |
| 13 | 16 | 9 May 2016 | 16 January 2017 |
| 14 | 16 | 5 October 2017 | 31 May 2018 |
| 15 | 24 | 3 October 2018 | 3 December 2019 |
| 16 | 14 | 31 August 2020 | 22 February 2021 |
| 17 | 20 | 30 August 2021 | 14 November 2022 |
| 18 | 20 | 20 March 2023 | 25 December 2023 |

=== Wheeler Dealers Revisited ===
Wheeler Dealers Revisited (ca. 2010) was a set of 5 programmes tracking down some of the cars that had been restored and sold a few years previously.

1. 1983 Jeep CJ7 (s4 ep3-4)
2. 1972 Alfa Romeo Spider Veloce 2000 (s4 e5-6)
3. 1976 Porsche 911S 2.7 Targa (s4 e1-2)
4. 1985 BMW 635CSi (s4 e7-8)
5. 1990 Mazda MX-5 NA 1.6 (s3 e1-2)

=== Wheeler Dealers: Stripped Down ===
Starting in 2020 Wheeler Dealers: Stripped Down is a re-issue of some of the older series, with each program cut down to fit a 30-minute broadcast slot.

=== U.S. Top 5 Specials ===
| Series | Episodes | Originally aired | |
| Series | Episodes | Series premiere | Series finale |
|---|---|---|---|
| 1 | 5 | 5 June 2013 | 3 July 2013 |

Discovery U.S.'s Velocity channel commissioned a series of one-hour Wheeler Dealers: Top 5 Specials hosted by Mike Brewer, featuring the top five vehicles of each genre Brewer and China have worked on during the first nine years of the show.

The specials began airing 5 June 2013, on the way to a Top 5 Viewer's Choice finale on 3 July 2013.

These episodes have been shown in the UK on the Discovery Channel at the end of season 11.1 and started on 5 May 2014.

| Episode | Top 5 | Originally Aired |
|---|---|---|
| 1 | 80s Icons | 5 June 2013 |
5. Lancia Delta HF Integrale 8v (2006); 4. Peugeot 205 GTi 1.9 (2004); 3. Chevrolet Corvette C4 (2007); 2. Audi Quattro (2009); 1. DMC DeLorean (2011)
| 2 | American Icons | 12 June 2013 |
5. Dodge Charger (2011); 4. Chevrolet 3100 Stepside (2011); 3. Ford Mustang Fastback (2012); 2. Willys MB (2012); 1. Chevrolet BelAir 210 (2011)
| 3 | Micro Cars | 19 June 2013 |
5. Mini Moke (2011); 4. Lotus Elan S3 (2010); 3. Fiat 500 (2008); 2. BMW Isetta 300 (2012); 1. Austin Mini Mk1 (2003)
| 4 | Performance Cars | 26 June 2013 |
5. Porsche 944 Turbo (2009); 4. Ford Sierra Sapphire RS Cosworth (2010); 3. BMW M5 E39 (2012); 2. Lotus Esprit S3 (2008); 1. Nissan Skyline R33 (2012)
| 5 | Viewer's Choice | 3 July 2013 |
5. Volkswagen Type 2 T2 (2010); 4. Jaguar E-Type Series 3 (2011); 3. Morgan +4 (2012); 2. Ferrari Dino 308 GT4 (2009); 1. Gardner Douglas Cobra (2012)

=== Wheeler Dealers: Trading Up ===
| Series | Episodes | Originally aired | |
| Series | Episodes | Series premiere | Series finale |
|---|---|---|---|
| 1 | 6 | 2 April 2013 | 7 May 2013 |
| 2 | 6 | 6 August 2014 | 10 September 2014 |

==== Series 1 (2013) ====
| # | Location | Vehicle | Budget | Purchase Price | Additional Costs | Final Selling Price | Profit / Loss | UK Air Date | UK Viewers (million) |
|---|---|---|---|---|---|---|---|---|---|
| 1 | Kolkata, India | 2004 Maruti Suzuki Alto LX | $3,000 | $2,150 | —N/a | $2,550 | $400 | 2 April 2013 | 0.15 |
| 1 | Kolkata, India | The car was bought off the street, and sold via a newspaper classified | | | | | | 2 April 2013 | 0.15 |
| 1 | Kolkata, India | 2004 Tata Indigo Marina | $3,400 | $2,350 | $25 | $2,850 | $475 | 2 April 2013 | 0.15 |
| 1 | Kolkata, India | The car was washed for $5; Mike had to replace the starter motor for $20 | | | | | | 2 April 2013 | 0.15 |
| 1 | Kolkata, India | 2000 Hindustan Ambassador Classic | $3,875 | $3,600 | $1,050 | $7,600 | $2,950 | 2 April 2013 | 0.15 |
| 2 | London, Herefordshire and Newark, UK | The car was shipped over to the UK and got stuck out at sea; Mike had to get the car serviced to drive on UK roads; Transport & service cost Mike $1,050 | | | | | | 9 April 2013 | 0.21 |
| 2 | London, Herefordshire and Newark, UK | 1971 Triumph Spitfire Mk IV Convertible | $3,000 | $2,400 | —N/a | $3,450 | $1,050 | 9 April 2013 | 0.21 |
| 2 | London, Herefordshire and Newark, UK | New seat foam was installed on the seats; The wheels were replaced with refurbished wire units | | | | | | 9 April 2013 | 0.21 |
| 2 | London, Herefordshire and Newark, UK | 1992 Land Rover 90 Defender | $4,050 | $4,100 | —N/a | $5,825 | $1,725 | 9 April 2013 | 0.21 |
| 2 | London, Herefordshire and Newark, UK | New front grille and headlamp bezels were installed; Wheels replaced with refurbished black alloy units | | | | | | 9 April 2013 | 0.21 |
| 2 | London, Herefordshire and Newark, UK | 1967 Chevrolet El Camino | $9,600 | $9,600 | $808 | $9,900 | -$508 | 9 April 2013 | 0.21 |
| 3 | Gothenburg, Uddevalla, Malmö and Fjällbacka, Sweden | The car was shipped over to Sweden from the UK; Repair & transport cost $808; Mike had to refund the buyer $2,300, as the engine was not as advertised | | | | | | 16 April 2013 | 0.26 |
| 3 | Gothenburg, Uddevalla, Malmö and Fjällbacka, Sweden | EPA-Traktor (1958 Volvo Duett) | $11,392 | $3,000 | $9 | $3,302 | $293 | 16 April 2013 | 0.26 |
| 3 | Gothenburg, Uddevalla, Malmö and Fjällbacka, Sweden | Fuel pump was replaced, cost $9 | | | | | | 16 April 2013 | 0.26 |
| 3 | Gothenburg, Uddevalla, Malmö and Fjällbacka, Sweden | 1972 Saab 96 | $11,685 | $1,850 | $23 | $2,460 | $587 | 16 April 2013 | 0.26 |
| 3 | Gothenburg, Uddevalla, Malmö and Fjällbacka, Sweden | The wheel hubs were cleaned and repainted, cost $23 | | | | | | 16 April 2013 | 0.26 |
| 3 | Gothenburg, Uddevalla, Malmö and Fjällbacka, Sweden | 1966 Volvo P1800 | $12,272 | $11,200 | $525 | $14,400 | $2,675 | 16 April 2013 | 0.26 |
| 3 | Gothenburg, Uddevalla, Malmö and Fjällbacka, Sweden | Right-hand-drive model; The car was shipped over to the UK from Sweden, cost $525 | | | | | | 16 April 2013 | 0.26 |
| 4 | Tokyo, Japan | 2003 Daihatsu Tanto | $12,649 | $11,070 | $640 | $12,820 | $1,110 | 23 April 2013 | 0.19 |
| 4 | Tokyo, Japan | The car was washed, clay-barred and polished; Repaired all scratches on front bumper; Total cost $640 | | | | | | 23 April 2013 | 0.19 |
| 4 | Tokyo, Japan | 2003 Nissan Stagea 250 RX | $13,759 | $4,225 | $1,516 | $7,692 | $1,951 | 23 April 2013 | 0.19 |
| 4 | Tokyo, Japan | Mike had to get the Shaken certificate for the car to be road legal, which cost $1,516 | | | | | | 23 April 2013 | 0.19 |
| 4 | Tokyo, Japan | 1976 Toyota Celica Coupe | $15,710 | $3,653 | $1,435 | $2,179 | -$2,909 | 23 April 2013 | 0.19 |
| 4 | Tokyo, Japan | The car had a faulty alternator, so Mike had to make the decision to put it straight back into auction and cost $1,435 | | | | | | 23 April 2013 | 0.19 |
| 5 | Mexico City, Mexico, San Francisco and Palm Springs, U.S. | 1956 Volkswagen Beetle | $12,801 | $10,400 | $200 | $11,500 | $900 | 30 April 2013 | 0.16 |
| 5 | Mexico City, Mexico, San Francisco and Palm Springs, U.S. | Rare German import built before Mexican production; New windscreen wipers and rear view mirror were replaced for $200 | | | | | | 30 April 2013 | 0.16 |
| 5 | Mexico City, Mexico, San Francisco and Palm Springs, U.S. | 1980 Rolls-Royce Silver Wraith II | $13,701 | $10,000 | $500 | $14,000 | $3,500 | 30 April 2013 | 0.16 |
| 5 | Mexico City, Mexico, San Francisco and Palm Springs, U.S. | Mike had to replace a flat tyre for $500 – including fuel | | | | | | 30 April 2013 | 0.16 |
| 5 | Mexico City, Mexico, San Francisco and Palm Springs, U.S. | 1967 Chevrolet Camaro | $17,201 | $15,000 | $100 | $27,142 | $9,292 | 30 April 2013 | 0.16 |
| 6 | Dubai, United Arab Emirates | The car was shipped over to Dubai from the U.S.; Got stuck out at sea, resulting in Mike having no money to buy a car; Mike had to get the car registered for Dubai (cost: $100) | | | | | | 7 May 2013 | 0.24 |
| 6 | Dubai, United Arab Emirates | 2005 Toyota Prado GX | $0 | $14,571 | $450 | $17,142 | $2,106 | 7 May 2013 | 0.24 |
| 6 | Dubai, United Arab Emirates | Mike had no money and had to persuade dealer to 'sell' him the car on trust and that Mike would pay him back after the car had been sold on; The car was washed, the engine steam cleaned and headlamps polished for $100; Window was tinted for $350 | | | | | | 7 May 2013 | 0.24 |
| 6 | Dubai, United Arab Emirates | 2001 Porsche 911 Carrera Convertible | $28,599 | $25,714 | —N/a | —N/a | —N/a | 7 May 2013 | 0.24 |
| 6 | Dubai, United Arab Emirates | —N/a | | | | | | 7 May 2013 | 0.24 |

==== Series 2 (2014) ====
| # | Location | Vehicle | Budget | Purchase Price | Additional Costs | Final Selling Price | Profit / Loss | UK Air Date | UK Viewers (million) |
|---|---|---|---|---|---|---|---|---|---|
| 1 | Sydney, Australia | 2000 Ford Falcon Futura AU II | $3,000 | $900 | $215 | $2,790 | $1,675 | 20 October 2014 | 0.23 |
| 1 | Sydney, Australia | Mike went to a scrapyard where he found a second hand driver-side mirror and headlamp for $80; Mike changed the parts and resprayed the bumper himself in order to cut the costs; Mike sourced out second hand camping equipment and bought it for around $135 | | | | | | 20 October 2014 | 0.23 |
| 1 | Sydney, Australia | 1981 Mazda RX-7 | $4,675 | $4,050 | $450 | $3,600 | -$900 | 20 October 2014 | 0.23 |
| 1 | Sydney, Australia | Mike had the car repainted for $450; Mike's friend, Richard put the car in his showroom to attract attention; The first bid on the Mazda was $5,130 with $480 profit, but in the end, the deal was called off | | | | | | 20 October 2014 | 0.23 |
| 1 | Sydney, Australia | 2002 Holden Commodore VU II UTE | $3,775 | $4,750 | $450 | $5,850 | $650 | 20 October 2014 | 0.23 |
| 1 | Sydney, Australia | Mike had to pay for the car via his credit card as there hadn't been a sale with the Mazda at this point; The car was detailed and the calipers were painted for $450; The car was sold to one of the mechanics who was working on the car | | | | | | 20 October 2014 | 0.23 |
| 1 | Sydney, Australia | 1972 Ford Escort Mk 1 | $4,425 | $4,950 | $1,368 | $14,240 | $7,922 | 20 October 2014 | 0.23 |
| 2 | Clacton-on-Sea, London, West Midlands & Aberdeen, United Kingdom | The car was shipped to UK in a container with a cost of $1,280; Mike had to register the car in the UK for $88; The floor panel was repaired | | | | | | 27 October 2014 | 0.24 |
| 2 | Clacton-on-Sea, London, West Midlands & Aberdeen, United Kingdom | 1983 Volkswagen Golf GTi Mk 1 | $12,347 | $5,200 | $160 | $7,200 | $1,700 | 27 October 2014 | 0.24 |
| 2 | Clacton-on-Sea, London, West Midlands & Aberdeen, United Kingdom | The ball joints had to be replaced for $160 | | | | | | 27 October 2014 | 0.24 |
| 2 | Clacton-on-Sea, London, West Midlands & Aberdeen, United Kingdom | 1999 Caterham 7 | $14,047 | $13,200 | $160 | $15,600 | $3,140 | 27 October 2014 | 0.24 |
| 2 | Clacton-on-Sea, London, West Midlands & Aberdeen, United Kingdom | Mike converted the car back into a road car; doors, seats, road roll cage and new 7 badge were put back on; Racing roll cage, racing seats, transponder and racing stickers were removed from the car and sold for $900; Andy charged $160 for helping Mike | | | | | | 27 October 2014 | 0.24 |
| 2 | Clacton-on-Sea, London, West Midlands & Aberdeen, United Kingdom | 2007 Land Rover Freelander | $17,187 | $15,200 | $80 | $17,000 | $1,478 | 27 October 2014 | 0.24 |
| 2 | Clacton-on-Sea, London, West Midlands & Aberdeen, United Kingdom | As Mike was driving the car, he noticed that the SRS light was showing, this was due to a loose plug on the passenger side causing an open airbag circuit. This was fixed for $80 | | | | | | 27 October 2014 | 0.24 |
| 3 | São Paulo, Brazil | 1972 Volkswagen Kombi | $18,646 | $12,174 | $435 | $13,913 | $1,304 | 3 November 2014 | 0.22 |
| 3 | São Paulo, Brazil | The expert considered that the car has more than 80% of the original parts and can be registered as a collectors car (with black number plates). This cost Mike $435 | | | | | | 3 November 2014 | 0.22 |
| 3 | São Paulo, Brazil | 1962 Willys Jeep | $19,950 | $10,000 | $48 | $10,435 | $387 | 3 November 2014 | 0.22 |
| 3 | São Paulo, Brazil | The buying price included two new front wings replacements, which cost $65 to replace them; The old front wings were taken to a scrapyard and Mike got $17; The mechanic that fitted the wings ended up buying the car | | | | | | 3 November 2014 | 0.22 |
| 3 | São Paulo, Brazil | 1976 Chevrolet Opala | $20,337 | $5,217 | $6 | $6,522 | $1,319 | 3 November 2014 | 0.22 |
| 3 | São Paulo, Brazil | The car was foam washed for $6 | | | | | | 3 November 2014 | 0.22 |
| 4 | Austin Texas, U.S. | 1972 Chevrolet Corvette Stingray | $21,655 | $17,000 | $440 | $22,500 | $5,060 | 10 November 2014 | —N/a |
| 4 | Austin Texas, U.S. | Electronic ignition system fitted to replace original mechanical points system, increasing the BHP from 145 to 195, this cost Mike $440 | | | | | | 10 November 2014 | —N/a |
| 4 | Austin Texas, U.S. | 1959 Chevrolet Apache | $26,715 | $11,000 | $940 | $14,500 | $2,560 | 10 November 2014 | —N/a |
| 4 | Austin Texas, U.S. | Mike bought a chrome plated grill, front bumper and front headlight bezels for $850; Other ornaments and badges were sandblasted for $90 | | | | | | 10 November 2014 | —N/a |
| 4 | Austin Texas, U.S. | 1969 Jaguar E-Type | $29,275 | $16,000 | $5,000 | $37,000 | $10,000 | 10 November 2014 | —N/a |
| 5 | Warsaw & Gdynia, Poland | Mike refurbished the cracked steering wheel; The wheels were steam cleaned, engine bay chemically cleaned and tyres dressed; A whole new braking system had to be installed; The carburettors were dismantled and rebuilt; The driver's seat was patched up by an upholsterer for $200; Total costs were about $5000 (including the ripped leather seat) | | | | | | 17 November 2014 | —N/a |
| 5 | Warsaw & Gdynia, Poland | 1973 Fiat 126p | $39,275 | $1,000 | $500 | $1,833 | $333 | 17 November 2014 | —N/a |
| 5 | Warsaw & Gdynia, Poland | The purchase price includes a set of alloy wheels; The car was vinyl wrapped for $500; The car was auctioned at a car fair in Warsaw | | | | | | 17 November 2014 | —N/a |
| 5 | Warsaw & Gdynia, Poland | 1984 GAZ-66 | $39,608 | $4,000 | $0 | $4,700 | $700 | 17 November 2014 | —N/a |
| 5 | Warsaw & Gdynia, Poland | Mike sold the truck to a military dealer in the UK via a video call, before he even bought it. | | | | | | 17 November 2014 | —N/a |
| 6 | Milan, Mantua, & Modena, Italy | 1980 Vespa Primavera 125 ET3 | $40,308 | $4,900 | $322 | $7,000 | $1,596 | 24 November 2014 | —N/a |
| 6 | Milan, Mantua, & Modena, Italy | Mike offered to service the scooter himself to lower the purchase price; The aftermarket luggage rack removed; The carburettor was refurbished and cleaned up; The rear view mirror was changed; The scooter was washed; Total cost for parts was $322 | | | | | | 24 November 2014 | —N/a |
| 6 | Milan, Mantua, & Modena, Italy | 1993 Lancia Delta Integrale Evoluzione II | $41,904 | $35,000 | $10 | $39,000 | $3,990 | 24 November 2014 | —N/a |
| 6 | Milan, Mantua, & Modena, Italy | The car was purchased in Menton, France, due to the high demand of re-importing Delta Integrales from other countries; The paint was touched up by Mike due to damage from stone chips; Mike's trader contact ended up buying the car as a trade when the potential buyers failed to turn up. | | | | | | 24 November 2014 | —N/a |
| 6 | Milan, Mantua, & Modena, Italy | 1989 Ferrari 348 tb | $45,378 | $44,800 | —N/a | —N/a | —N/a | 24 November 2014 | —N/a |
| 6 | Milan, Mantua, & Modena, Italy | —N/a | | | | | | 24 November 2014 | —N/a |

=== Wheeler Dealers World Tour ===
| Series | Episodes | Originally aired | |
| Series | Episodes | Series premiere | Series finale |
|---|---|---|---|
| 1 | 10 | 6 May 2024 | 1 July 2024 |
| 2 | 10 | 24 September 2025 | 19 November 2025 |
| 3 | 10 | 23 September 2026 | TBC |

==== Season 1 (2024) ====
| No. | Location | Vehicle | Budget | Purchase Price | Final cost After restoration | Final Selling price | Profit/loss | Original airdate |
| 1 | Italy | 1990 Ferrari 348 | €70,000 | €65,000 | €66,905 | N/A | N/A | 6 May 2024 |
|---|---|---|---|---|---|---|---|---|
| 1 | Work Completed: CV boots replaced, CV joints re-greased, cam belt replaced, idler wheels replaced, tensioner replaced, bumper professionally repaired, steering wheel returned to original black leather trim, seats cleaned. Notes: Formerly owned by Miki Biasion and was repainted from red to black at some point. Interior was retrimmed from black to ice white at some point. Seller also provided service history from Ferrari. Mike headed to Carrozzeria Zanasi at Maranello to have the car bumper professionally repaired. Upon further inspection, Mike learned that the steering wheel is only layered in white leather trim, while the original black leather remained intact under the trim layer, enabling him to just remove the white leather trim and clean the steering wheel. Restored car taken to Autodromo di Modena. | | | | | | | |
| 2 | Poland | 1991 Polski Fiat 126p | zł | zł14,900 | zł19,900 | zł25,000 | +zł5,100 | 13 May 2024 |
| 2 | Work Completed: Pushrod oil seals replaced, transverse leaf spring re-arched and serviced with new bushings and mounts, engine upgraded to electronic ignition, front bumper changed from rubber to chrome, roof rack installed, new switches installed, wing mirrors replaced, period correct suitcase fitted, new tires and wheels installed. Notes: Low mileage unit with 36,000 kilometers on the clock, bought in Łódź. Car broke down during testing due to damaged engine. Mike went to a Fiat 126p car meet in Łódź that has been held since the car ceased production in 2000 to look for inspiration for the car's restoration. Sold at asking price. | | | | | | | |
| 3 | Germany | 1989 BMW M3 E30 | €70,000 | €69,000 | €71,299 | N/A | N/A | 20 May 2024 |
| 3 | Work Completed: Differential shims replaced, front discs and brake pads replaced, engine clearances re-adjusted, driver's seat repaired, underbody cleaned using dry ice, non-original red stripe sticker removed, new wheels and tires installed. Notes: Car had around 180,000 kilometers at the time of purchase; however, the engine underwent a full rebuild and had just done 5,000 kilometers since. Most expensive car purchased by the Wheeler Dealers team to date. Mike noticed that the driver's seat had a cigarette burn. Mike and Elvis spent a night at a hotel that features an indoor garage to prevent risk of loss. | | | | | | | |
| 4 | France | 1962 Citroën 2CV Fourgonnette | €14,000 | €12,000 | €12,975 | N/A | N/A | 27 May 2024 |
| 4 | Work Completed: Engine power increased by installing bigger inlet/exhaust manifold and bigger carburetors, aftermarket Traffic Clutch centrifugal clutch system installed, suspensions rebuilt using new rod ends, new rubber bellows, old number plates restored, rear seats installed. Notes: Seller provided two 2CV Fourgonnettes for Mike to choose; one is a survivor 1973 model with 602 cc engine, while the other is an earlier 1962 model with 425 cc engine that had been partially restored and came with original documentation. Mike noted that the latter car originally came as a four-seater van, which makes it rarer and more desirable. Mike and Elvis originally wanted to perform an engine swap, however, Mike's contact advised against it due to legal and administrative complexities as well as risk of devaluing the car. This episode is dedicated to Jack Wilcock, one of Mike's contacts in France, who died prior to the episode's airing. | | | | | | | |
| 5 | Australia | 2005 Ford Falcon XR8 | AU$24,000 | AU$21,000 | AU$27,995 | AU$29,000 | +AU$1,005 | 3 June 2024 |
| 5 | Work Completed: Camshafts replaced with more aggressive items, standard air filter replaced with cold air induction kit, exhaust system replaced with freer flowing items, brakes replaced, ECU remapped to accommodate power-related modifications, racing stripes installed. Notes: Mike and Elvis paid homage to the Mad Max media franchise, as well as the popular Ford vs Holden rivalry in Australia, which helped to increase Ford Falcon's fame. Seller was absent during the time of purchase, however, he provided the code to his garage, which enabled Mike to inspect the car. Mike and Elvis initially wanted to bolt a supercharger onto the engine, but found out that such kit is costly. Restored car taken to Mount Panorama Circuit for a drag race against an HSV GTS. | | | | | | | |
| 6 | Australia | 1972 Volkswagen Kombi | AU$40,000 | AU$34,000 | AU$38,500 | AU$42,000 | +AU$3,500 | 9 June 2024 |
| 6 | Work Completed: Gear linkage bushes replaced, kitchen set installed, solar panel kit installed, water storage kit installed, cooler box installed, roof awning installed. Notes: Converted into a campervan. Elvis' partner at the shop taught him a lesson about being a bush mechanic by making a homemade gasket out of cardboard to address the Kombi's leaking fuel pump oil gasket. | | | | | | | |
| 7 | Australia | 1999 Toyota Hilux | AU$11,000 | AU$11,000 | AU$16,000 | AU$18,000 | +AU$2,000 | 10 June 2024 |
| 7 | Work Completed: Polyurethane suspension bushes installed, uprated steering damper installed, snorkel intake installed, rear bed repaired and repainted, off-road kits consisting of new brush bar, new side steps, and spot lights installed, steel wheels repainted, new off-road tires installed. Notes: Bought sight unseen at a farm with 300,000 kilometers on the clock. Mike learned about off-roading from Simmo's Offroad Tours in Bathurst. Converted into an adventure off-roader. | | | | | | | |
| 8 | Australia | 1980 Holden WB Panel Van | AU$20,000 | AU$20,000 | AU$30,000 | AU$35,000 | +AU$5,000 | 17 June 2024 |
| 8 | Work Completed: Lowering kit installed, carburetor replaced, water system flushed and refilled with fresh coolant, full body vinyl wrap applied, valve cover repainted, radiator hoses replaced, thermostat replaced, carpeting installed, roof rack installed. Notes: Elvis noted that it was originally white, as shown by the engine bay paint; the car is black at the time of purchase. Converted into a Holden Sandman 'tribute car', as it is not an original Holden Sandman. Elvis' partner in Australia, himself a bush mechanic, taught him the art of flushing radiator systems using lemon juice, as lemon juice contains citric acid. Sold at asking price. | | | | | | | |
| 9 | America | McLaren P1 | N/A | N/A | N/A | N/A | N/A | 24 June 2024 |
| 9 | Work Completed: Flood-damaged fuel pumps fixed, fuel tank cleaned, damaged carbon fiber diffuser restored, custom twin turbochargers installed, larger fuel injectors installed, wiring harness re-made, exhaust system ceramic coated, new cam phasers installed, hybrid system removed. Notes: Commissioned on behalf of Freddy "Tavarish" Hernandez, a notorious YouTube personality who owns a hurricane-damaged McLaren P1. Tavarish met the Wheeler Dealers team at Goodwood Festival of Speed, where Elvis also reminisce his past tenure as mechanic for the McLaren Formula One team. Modified to be 'the fastest McLaren in history' with the McLaren Speedtail as benchmark. Biggest project taken by the Wheeler Dealers team to date. Due to the flood damage as well as Tavarish's goal to remove the hybrid system, the car's wiring harness had to be custom made from two separate donors. This episode marks the first time in Wheeler Dealers' history where the team did not finish a car. | | | | | | | |
| 10 | United Kingdom | 1990s Austin Mini | £5,000 | £4,500 | £9,000 | £12,500 | +£3,500 | 1 July 2024 |
| 10 | Work Completed: Engine fully refurbished with cylinders bored up cylinders oversized pistons, as well as various ancillaries, short-ratio differential installed, bucket seats installed, spotlights installed, dashboard re-made, period correct dials and gauges installed, interior re-upholstered, new steering wheel installed, full respray yo red with white roof performed, private registration plates applied, tribute plaque installed, new wheels and tyres installed. Notes: Mike reminisce about his childhood and younger days, where he used to own, buy, and sell Minis, including those aired on television. Converted into Paddy Hopkirk's Monte Carlo Rally-winning tribute car. Previous owner sold the car to a dealer, so Mike bought the car off the dealer. Mike and Elvis are joined by a friend of Mike who trains children to be car mechanics. Mike paid a visit to Patrick, Paddy Hopkirk's son, where Patrick showed him a number of things: the 1964 Monte Carlo Rally trophy that was presented by Grace Kelly, a telegram from Ringo Starr whom he sent after Paddy Hopkirk gave him a lift as well as a signed photograph from The Beatles. Elvis taught the kids about a differential's final drive, as the car came with three sets of differentials with various ratios. Mike added a tributary plaque from an old trophy that Patrick presented to him. Restored car taken to Col de Turini, the penultimate leg of the 1964 Monte Carlo Rally, where Paddy Hopkirk started to claw his way back and claimed victory at the rally. | | | | | | | |

==== Season 2 (2025) ====
| No. | Location | Vehicle | Budget | Purchase Price | Final cost After restoration | Final Selling price | Profit/loss | Original airdate |
| 1 | Mexico | Volkswagen Beetle | US$4,000 | US$3,500 | US$7,440 | US$9,000 | +US$1,560 | 24 September 2025 |
|---|---|---|---|---|---|---|---|---|
| 1 | Work Completed: Torsion bar adjusted to increase ride height, off-road suspensions installed, standard engine swapped with 90 horsepower race-spec engine, leaking brake cylinder fixed, wheels and tires replaced with off-road counterparts, light bar installed, safety nets installed, skid plate installed, racing harnesses installed, racing seats installed, racing steering wheel installed, custom roll cage installed, partial repaint performed, custom vinyls applied Notes: Converted into Baja Bug. Marc paid a visit to four-time Baja 1000 winner Oliver Flemate, where most of the car's work is done at Flemate's shop. Due to time and budget constraints, Marc opted to respray only the car's wings. | | | | | | | |
| 2 | Brazil | Volkswagen SP2 | R$180,000 | R$180,000 | R$200,000 | R$220,000 | +R$20,000 | 1 October 2025 |
| 2 | Work Completed: Car thoroughly washed, engine oil leak fixed with a new, two-piece pushrod tube, larger carburetors and high-performance air filters fitted, programmable electronic ignition distributor installed, twin-pipe exhaust system installed to replace damaged exhaust, magnesium alloy wheels and tires fitted, center console restored. Notes: Bought in São Paulo. Mike paid a visit to the car's designer, José Vicente "Jota" Novita Martins, who envisioned the car to have a bigger powerplant and wheels, but was unable to do so due to limitations imposed by Volkswagen at the time. Mike managed to source a set of magnesium alloy wheels for the SP2, itself a rare item. The electronic ignition distributor that was fitted to the car enabled the car to have an immobilizer feature. The restored car was taken to a local drag strip. | | | | | | | |
| 3 | Portugal | Mini Moke | €18,000 | €16,000 | €27,000 | €32,000 | +€5,000 | 8 October 2025 |
| 3 | Work Completed: Rubber cone suspensions replaced with coil springs and adjustable dampers, interior fully restored, bodywork fully restored, engine cleaned, ported, and polished, gear selector mechanism repaired, new subframe installed, steering rack replaced, adjustable steering rack end installed, LED lighting installed, new wheels and tires installed. Notes: Car had water damage. Interior restoration done outside the workshop at Porto. Mike and Elvis used a UMM 4x4 convertible to drive around Lisbon. | | | | | | | |
| 4 | Germany | Audi RS2 | €40,000 | €??,000 | €47,000 | €56,000 | +€9,000 | 15 October 2025 |
| 4 | Work Completed: The cambelt and water pump were replaced, along with an auxiliary radiator. The wheels and brake calipers were refurbished. A new stainless steel exhaust was fitted. Notes: The car was a barn find by the previous owner. The car was raced against a Ferrari F355 Spider in a wet slalom to show the benefits of the Quattro system. | | | | | | | |
| 5 | Spain | SEAT 600 | €?5,000 | €5,000 | €??,000 | €7,900 | +€?,000 | 22 October 2025 |
| 5 | Work Completed: The bumpers, wheels covers, etc, were rechromed. The steering box was repaired. The engine was serviced. The paint was polished. Notes: | | | | | | | |
| 6 | Turkey | Anadol STC16 | €35,000 | €35,000 | €??,000 | €42,000 | +€?,000 | 29 October 2025 |
| 6 | Work Completed: The car's mounting holes which connect the steel chassis to the fiberglass body were damaged both in the chassis and the body, so they were repaired. Also, one of the doors had a break which was also repaired. The carburetor on the Ford Kent engine was upgraded to a double-barreled model. One missing headlight surround was replaced by a 3-D printed one. Notes: | | | | | | | |
| 7 | Czech Republic | Škoda 110 R | €??,000 | €??,000 | €??,000 | €??,000 | +€1,200 | 5 November 2025 |
| 7 | Work Completed: | | | | | | | |
| 8 | Italy | Fiat Barchetta | €??,000 | €??,000 | €??,000 | €00,000 | +€?,000 | 12 November 2025 |
| 8 | Work Completed: The variator in the engine was repaired as new ones aren't available. The soft top was replaced by a new one. Notes: The car was gifted to the Barchetta club instead of being sold. | | | | | | | |
| 9 | Malta | Ford Cortina | €??,000 | €??,000 | €??,000 | €??,000 | +€?,000 | 19 November 2025 |
| 9 | Work Completed: | | | | | | | |
| 10 | Scotland | Hillman Imp | €??,000 | £7,125 | £8,492 | £8,500 | +£8 | 19 November 2025 |
| 10 | Work Completed: | | | | | | | |

==== Season 3 (2026) ====
| No. | Location | Vehicle | Budget | Purchase Price | Final cost After restoration | Final Selling price | Profit/loss | Original airdate |
| 1 | Japan | Honda NSX | ¥12, 000, 000 | ¥12, 000, 000 | ¥13, 400, 000 | ¥15, 000, 000 | +¥1, 600, 000 | 23 September 2026 |
|---|---|---|---|---|---|---|---|---|
| 1 | Work Completed: Manual gearbox conversion, new clutch pedal, new dashboard, ECU tuned, seat repaired, new flywheel, new clutch & clutch plate. Notes: Mike finds a rare NSX manual gearbox to fit the car. | | | | | | | |
| 2 | Japan | Suzuki Cappuccino | ¥450, 000 | ¥450, 000 | ¥1, 000, 000 | ¥1, 500, 000 | +¥500, 000 | 30 September 2026 |
| 2 | Work Completed: Added a LSD (Limited-Slip Differential), installed a high-performance exhaust, refurbished the synchromesh, overhauled the steering, replaced the turbo, fitted lightweight alloy wheels, and a carbon fibre car bonnet. Notes: Mike and Elvis decide to turn the Cappuccino into a drift car. | | | | | | | |
| 3 | Italy | Lancia Delta Integrale | €38, 000 | €38, 000 | €43, 000 | €48, 000 | +€5, 000 | 7 October 2026 |
| 3 | Work Completed: Refurbished the turbo, upgraded the ECU, and replaced: engine gaskets, viscous coupling, suspension top mounts, exhaust, air filter, and alloy wheels. Notes: During the test drive, Mike and Elvis notice that the Integrale has a smoky exhaust and has handling problems. | | | | | | | |
| 4 | Serbia | Yugo 55 | €650 | €650 | N/A | €1500 | N/A | 14 October 2026 |
| 4 | Work Completed: Overhauled the braking system, refurbished and lowered the suspension system, fixed the steering fault, installed a reconditioned carburetor, added interior soundproofing, replaced old wheels with alloy wheels, and refreshed the paintwork. Notes: Mike purchases a tired Yugo 55; Elvis is initially disappointed with Mike's choice of car, but is a lot more enthusiastic when the restoration is complete. In this episode, we are not told the cost of the restoration or how much profit was made when the car was sold. | | | | | | | |
| 5 | France | Citroen CX | €6, 500 | €6, 500 | €8, 540 | €10, 500 | +€1, 960 | 21 October 2026 |
| 5 | Work Completed: New spheres, regulators, suspension octopus, lines, interior retrim, and refurbished wheels. Notes: After going to see a Citroen CX Limousine, Mike and Elvis agree that it has too many faults, and instead decide to buy a Citroen CX GTI. Elvis has his hands full fixing the car's faulty hydropneumatic suspension system and self-centering steering system. Mike hires a car upholsterer to repair the CX's shabby interior. | | | | | | | |

== Other vehicles ==
Brewer has used a variety of vehicles on Wheeler Dealers to travel to see prospective vehicles and/or tow them if they are not in running order or street legal.

Brewer has used a Mitsubishi Shogun to travel around England between Series 9 to 12. Vehicles used prior to series 9 include a dark turquoise Nissan Primera Estate (Series 1), a blue Subaru Legacy Estate (Series 4), a red Honda Accord Tourer (Series 2), a black SsangYong Rexton II (Series 5), a dark blue SsangYong Kyron (Series 6), a black Land Rover Discovery 4 (Series 7b), a blue Nissan X-Trail (Series 3) and a light blue Ford Kuga (Series 7a). For Series 8a, he used a black X-Trail. For Series 12b, he used a white Mercedes-Benz Sprinter to transport the Messerschmitt KR200 back to the workshop.

When Brewer travelled to France in series 5 to purchase a Citroën DS, he rented a French-registered black Opel Zafira; he rented a newer version of the Zafira when he returned to France to buy the Renault Alpine A310 in series 9a. Brewer used a French-registered silver Toyota Corolla Verso when he returned to buy the Citroën 2CV in series 11a. When he returned to France in series 12b, he rented a French-registered grey Audi Q3 to purchase the Citroën HY.

=== Trading Up ===
For Trading Up, Brewer drove a white Toyota Fortuner owned by a used car dealer in India. In Dubai, Brewer's contact drove him around in a white Ferrari F430. In Texas, Brewer used a grey C2 Corvette. Taxicabs featured in the series included a yellow Hindustan Ambassador Grand and a green and yellow Bajaj RE in India, a black LTC TX4 in the UK, a black Toyota Crown Comfort in Japan, a yellow and red Volkswagen Sedan Type 1 in Mexico, a white Ford Falcon in Australia, a white Chevrolet Onix Sedan in Brazil, a yellow Dodge Charger in Texas, and a yellow Fiat 600 Multipla in Italy. For Hire Cars, he rented a Black Mitsubishi Shogun in the UK, a black Chrysler Grand Voyager in Brazil, a dark red GMC Yukon in Texas, a grey Land Rover Discovery 3 in Poland, and a white Fiat 500 in Italy. In Poland, when Brewer is taking the Fiat 126p to get vinyl wrapped, he borrowed a grey Opel Movano, to carry the car to the vinyl wrapping shop.

For the Wheeler Dealers: Top 5 US specials, Brewer stood in China's shop, in front of a red C2 Corvette.

=== Intro/segment vehicles ===
The opening sequences and filler segments from series 1 to 9 featured the cars that were worked on throughout their corresponding seasons:

- Series 1: All the vehicles done so far
- Series 2 and 3: MGB GT
- Series 4: Porsche 911 2.7S Targa
- Series 5: Mercedes-Benz R107 280SL
- Series 6: Ferrari Dino 308 GT4
- Series 7: Lotus Elan S3
- Series 8a: Jaguar E-Type Series 3
- Series 8b: Dodge Charger
- Series 9a: Fiat Dino
- Series 9b: Gardner Douglas Cobra

Series 10 did away with using cars on the opening and commercial break sequences, instead using a title card with the series logo and the colour(s) of the episode's car on the background. The filler segments, however, used the following cars:

- Series 10a: Aston Martin DB7
- Series 10b: Lamborghini Urraco P250S

Starting with series 11, Wheeler Dealers no longer uses cars on the filler segments.

== International productions ==
=== Sweden Special ===
On 2 April 2012, the Swedish version of the Discovery Channel aired a special episode called Wheeler Dealers Sverige Special (Wheeler Dealers Sweden Special). In this episode, the Swedish presenters bought a Ford Mustang for 55,000 SEK. After having to refurbish the brake calipers, swap the engine and giving the car a new paint job, they were able to sell it for 135,000 SEK, giving them a total profit of 28,000 SEK.

=== Wheeler Dealers France ===
The popularity of the original UK series led to a French-language spinoff titled Wheeler Dealers France, which premiered on 10 October 2016 on RMC Découverte. The series is presented by Gerry Blyenberg and Aurélien Letheux. Brewer made a special guest appearance on season 2 episode 1 of the series.

== See also ==
- Deals on Wheels – An earlier programme presented by Brewer with a similar premise.
- Salvage Hunters – A similar concept series, related to buying and selling antiques
