= Georgie Barrat =

British tech journalist and television presenter

- Occupations: Journalist, television presenter
- Years active: 2014–present
- Known for: The Gadget Show
- Website: georgiebarrat.com

Georgie Barrat is a British tech journalist and television presenter. She is best known as a presenter of The Gadget Show on 5.

== Early life ==
Barrat graduated from King's College London with a first-class degree in English Literature. She later gained a diploma in Radio Production. Since then Barrat has appeared on Radio 2 and Talksport.

== Career ==
Barrat is the resident tech expert on ITV's Weekend, where she talks Aled Jones through the newest gadgets while working with the production team to help source and create the feature. Georgie is also Carphone Warehouse's YouTube presenter and delivers Tech City News' weekly video roundup.

In 2017, Barrat joined The Gadget Show as a co-host alongside Craig Charles, Ortis Deley and Jon Bentley. In August 2017, she presented Can Crooks Hack Your Home?: Tonight for ITV.

== Personal life and advocacy ==
Barrat has a passion for getting more girls into coding and is an advocate for charities Stemettes and Baytree Centre, both of which encourage 11–14-year-olds to study STEM subjects at GCSE level and beyond.

On 25 November 2021, Barrat posted on Instagram that she was six months pregnant and was expecting a baby girl.
