= Suzi Perry =

British television presenter (born 1970)

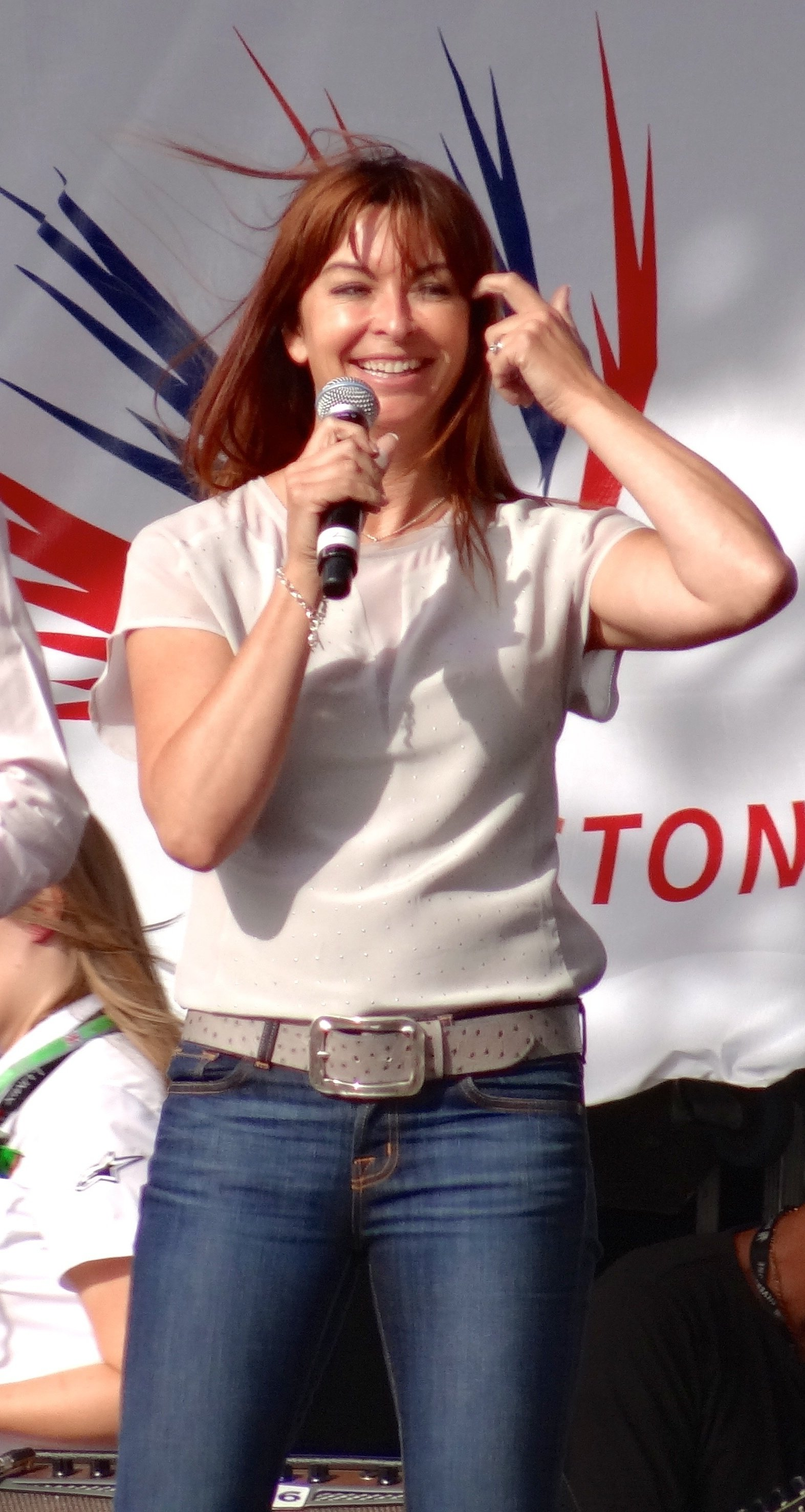
- Perry presenting at the 2013 British Grand Prix
- Born: 3 May 1970 (age 56); Cosford, Shropshire, England
- Other name: Suzanne Perry
- Education: Wolverhampton Polytechnic
- Occupations: Television presenter; journalist
- Employers: BT Sport; BBC
- Known for: Model; television presenter; columnist; sporting host
- Spouse(s): Steve Bullock (m. 1997; div. 2001) Bastien Boosten (m. 2009; div. 2019)
- Website: suziperry.com

Suzanne Perry (born 3 May 1970) is a British television presenter covering Grand Prix motorcycle racing for BT Sport. She is known for covering Grand Prix motorcycle racing for the BBC for 13 years, The Gadget Show on Channel 5 for eight years and the BBC's Formula One coverage from 2013 to 2015.

== Early life ==
Perry was born at RAF Hospital Cosford in Cosford, Shropshire, the daughter of a music promoter, and her godfather was guitarist Mel Galley.

Brought up in Finchfield, she attended Smestow School in Wolverhampton, and had a school job as a lighting technician at the Wolverhampton Grand Theatre. Perry went on to study business studies and finance at Wolverhampton Polytechnic, now the University of Wolverhampton.

After graduation, Perry spent 12 months in Japan working as a model, then as an advertising model following her return to Britain.

== Broadcasting career ==
=== BBC Sport ===
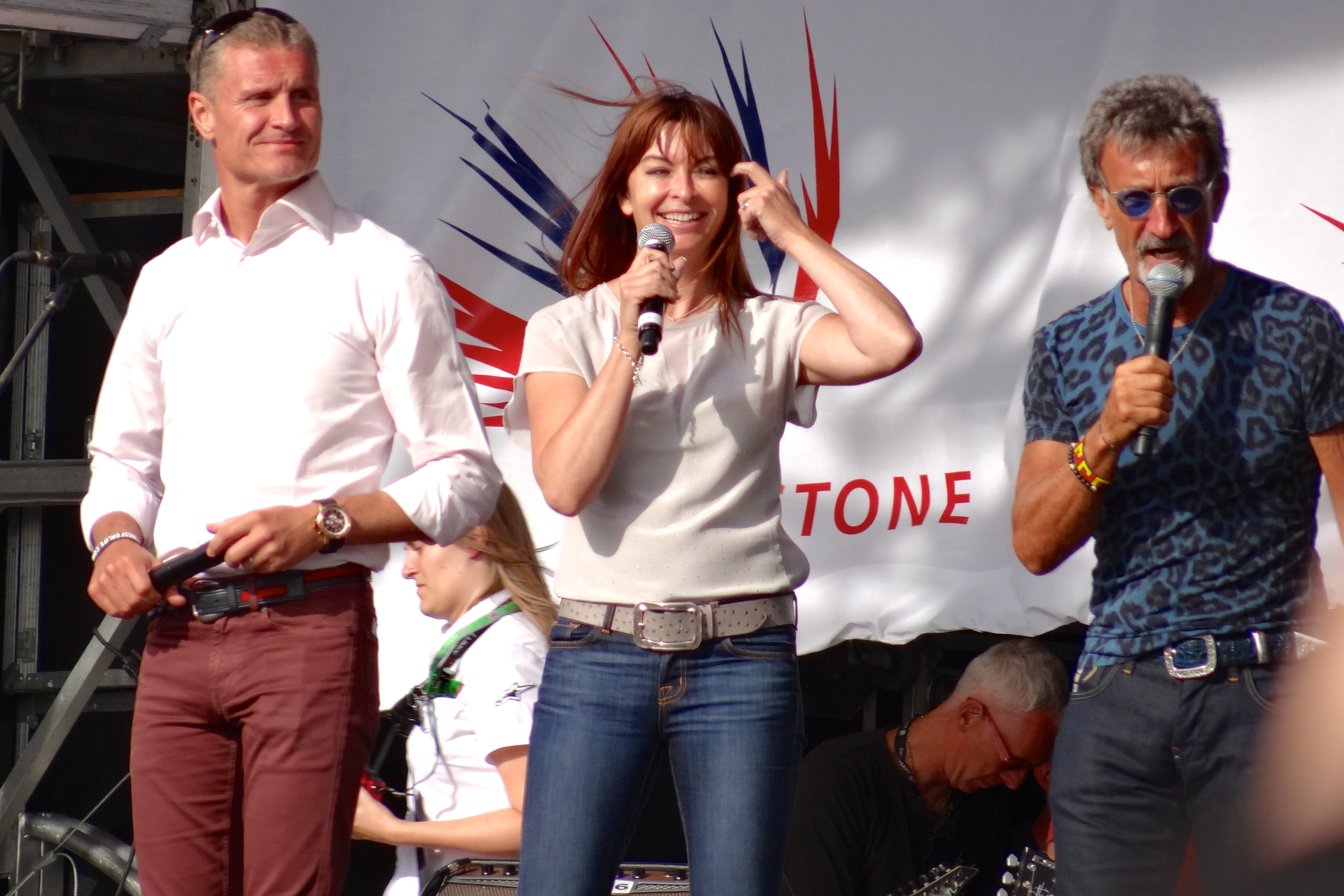
David Coulthard, Suzi Perry and Eddie Jordan at the 2013 British Grand Prix

Perry is mainly known as a motor sports correspondent, reporting on motorbike racing for BBC News as well as presenting other sports-related programmes, including Wimbledon, the Boat Race, the London Marathon, Royal Ascot and the Great North Run. She helped to present the 2004 Summer Olympics in Athens.

From 1997, Perry presented coverage of BBC Sport's Grand Prix motorcycle racing for 13 years. In February 2010, following a year in which she suffered a number of health issues including viral meningitis and an ectopic pregnancy, it was announced that she was stepping down from presenting motorcycle racing. She stated that the extensive travelling involved combined with her other TV commitments was having a detrimental effect on her work-life balance.

Following her departure from motorcycle racing, Perry was part of the BBC presenting team at the 2010 Epsom Derby, and Royal Ascot. She was due to be part of the 2011 Grand National coverage but was replaced at the last moment – without any explanation – by Dan Walker, who happened to be at Aintree presenting Football Focus on the same day.

On 21 December 2012, the BBC announced that Perry would replace Jake Humphrey as presenter of the BBC's Grand Prix car racing coverage from the 2013 season, covering 10 live races and 10 highlight shows. She also wrote regular blogs for BBC Sport to give a behind-the-scenes look at F1. This was the first time a woman had taken on the full-time main anchor-role in Formula One on British TV.

In 2015, it was announced Perry would present a new F1 show for BBC Two with Murray Walker. The show, called Formula 1 Rewind, involves Walker looking back at some of the BBC's archives.

=== BT Sport ===
In March 2016, it was announced that Perry would join BT Sport, presenting the channel's motorsport content, including World Championship motorcycle racing, FIM Speedway and the World Rally Championship. The announcement coincided with the news that UK terrestrial TV coverage of Formula 1 was moving from the BBC to Channel 4.

The BT Sport motorcycle racing team includes Perry, hosting the coverage alongside former bike racers and pundits Sylvain Guintoli, Michael Laverty, and Natalie Quirk. Commentary and reporting is provided by Neil Hodgson and Gavin Emmett.

=== Other television work ===
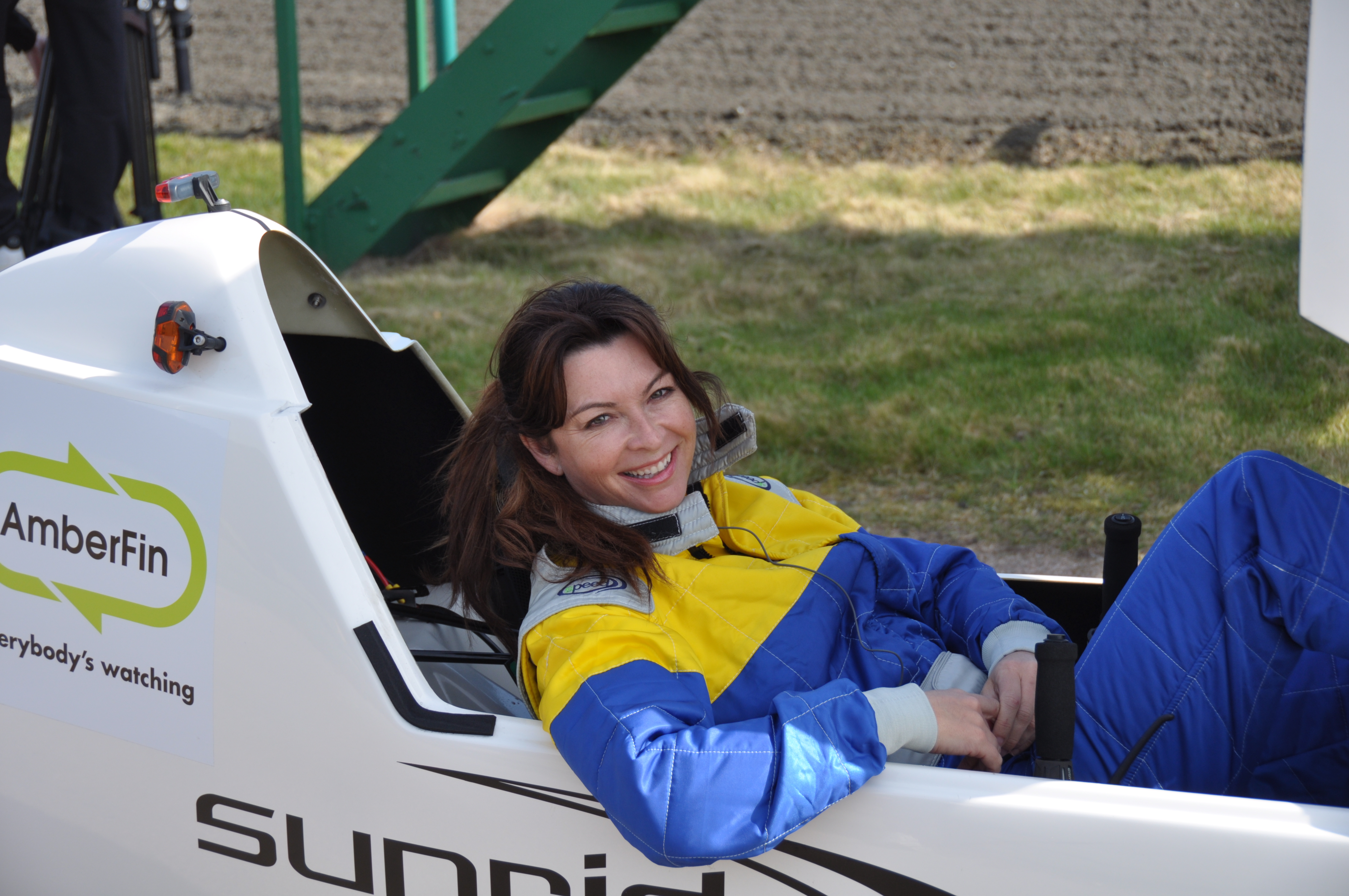
Perry filming for The Gadget Show in 2011

Perry was the original presenter of Live Elite League Speedway on Sky Sports. She appeared on the 2002–03 revival of Treasure Hunt, where she took the "skyrunner" role made famous by Anneka Rice.

Since 2004, Perry had been a co-presenter for Channel 5's The Gadget Show, a hi-tech weekly programme, alongside Jason Bradbury, Jon Bentley, Ortis Deley and Pollyanna Woodward. She was temporarily replaced by Gail Porter while recovering from an ectopic pregnancy, and returned in August 2009. Perry created the current theme music for the Gadget Show in 2011, as part of one of the show's challenges. In February 2012, it was announced that the show's format was going to change and be renamed The Gadget Show: World Tour, featuring only two of the previous team of presenters: Jason Bradbury and Pollyanna Woodward.

On 15 May 2008, Perry appeared on Through the Keyhole on BBC Two, allowing Lisa Snowdon to look around her property before being identified by the panel. In 2010, Perry appeared on ITV's All Star Mr & Mrs with husband Bastien.

Her other shows include Housecall, Superstars, City Hospital, How to take Stunning Pictures and Holiday.

On 10 March 2012, Perry danced to "Livin' the Vida Loca" with ex-Gadget Show fellow presenter Ortis Deley for the BBC's Let's Dance for Comic Relief. Perry was a guest panellist on the Channel 5 magazine show The Wright Stuff, alongside comedian Lee Hurst, for the week of 19–23 March 2012. Her appearance as a guest in the third series of BBC Two's The Sarah Millican Television Programme was shown on 2 November 2013. On 14 June 2014, she co-presented the BBC's coverage of Trooping the Colour with Huw Edwards.

In 2017, she presented Suzi Perry's Queens of the Road and Invented in London for BBC One.

=== Radio work ===
Perry presented Suzi Perry's Formula 1 Anthems on BBC Radio 2 during her time with BBC's Formula 1 commentary team.

=== Online broadcasts ===
During the coronavirus lockdown of spring 2020, Perry began a series of live Instagram broadcasts, called 'Suzi's Breakfast Club', that incorporated interviews with people from the worlds of sport, music and entertainment. These included motorsport stars Carl Fogarty, James Toseland, Colin Edwards, Max Biaggi, Steve Parrish, Mark Blundell, David Coulthard, and Jason Plato. Also Jack Savoretti, Carol Vorderman, and Mark King of Level 42. The majority of broadcasts were also uploaded to YouTube.

== Honours ==
In September 2016, Perry was made an honorary Doctor of Engineering by the University of Wolverhampton for services to science, technology, and work encouraging young entrepreneurs.

== Personal life ==
In 1997, Perry married Steve Bullock; their marriage lasted four years. In September 2008, she was engaged to her Dutch boyfriend, Bastien Boosten, whom she met while filming The Gadget Show She suffered a ruptured ectopic pregnancy on 17 February 2009, and was taken to West Middlesex Hospital from her home in Chiswick, where she underwent surgery after losing four pints of blood. From April 2010, Perry lived in London, but shared a house in the south of France with Boosten. By 2023, Perry described herself as twice divorced. As of 2025, she resides in Wolverhampton.

In 2019, Perry contracted Dengue fever virus followed by post viral fatigue which forced her out for six weeks. In 2023, Perry missed six races because of a suspected heart problem, coped with the death of her mother and a close-friend from schooldays, then had to care for her dad after he fell and broke his femur.

Perry is a supporter of Wolverhampton Wanderers football club.

=== Charity ===
In 2006, Perry appeared as a celebrity showjumper in the BBC's Sport Relief event Only Fools on Horses. On 12 July, after being voted off the show, she revealed that she had fallen off her horse 12 times.

Perry is a patron of Promise Dreams, a charity launched in 2001 in her home town of Wolverhampton, to provide treatment for seriously or terminally ill children and to support their families.
