= Craig Charles =

English actor (born 1964)

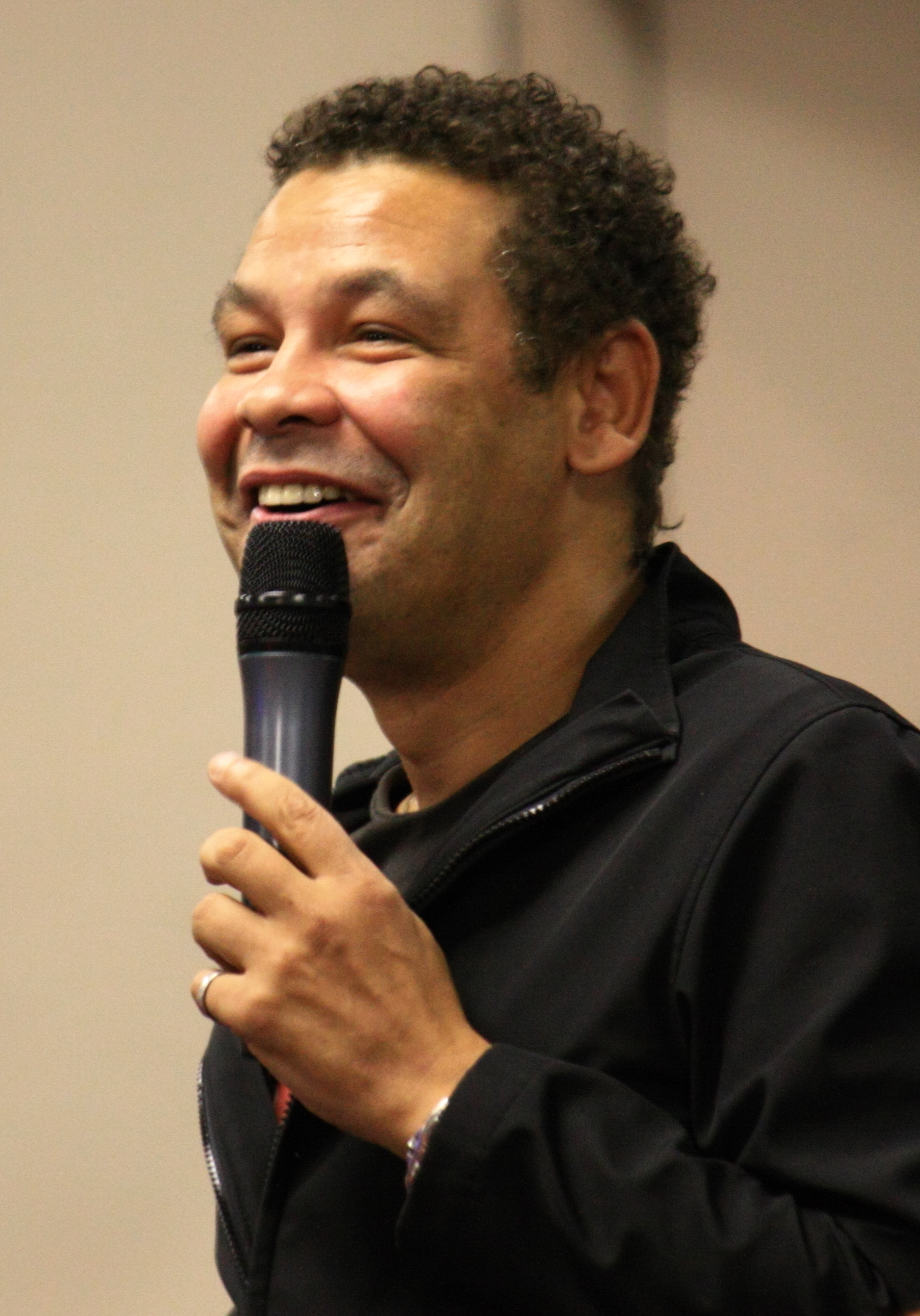
- Charles in 2009
- Born: Craig Joseph Charles; 11 July 1964 (age 62); Liverpool, England
- Occupations: Actor; presenter; comedian; author; poet; DJ
- Years active: 1981–present
- Known for: Red Dwarf; Coronation Street; Robot Wars; Takeshi's Castle
- Spouses: Cathy Tyson (m. 1984; div. 1989) Jackie Fleming (m. 1999)
- Children: 3

Craig Joseph Charles (born 11 July 1964) is a British actor, comedian, radio and TV presenter, and DJ. He is best known for his roles as Dave Lister in the science fiction sitcom Red Dwarf and Lloyd Mullaney in the soap opera Coronation Street (2005–2015). He presented the gladiator-style game show Robot Wars from 1998 to 2004, and narrated the comedy endurance show Takeshi's Castle. As a DJ, he appears on BBC Radio 6 Music.

Charles first appeared on television as a performance poet, which led to minor presenting roles. After finding fame in Red Dwarf, he regularly featured on national television with celebrity appearances on many popular shows while he continued to host a wide variety of programmes. From 2017 to 2022, Charles hosted The Gadget Show for Channel 5. His acting credits include playing inmate Eugene Buffy in the ITV drama The Governor, and leading roles in the British films Fated and Clubbing to Death.

Charles has hosted The Craig Charles Funk and Soul Show on BBC radio since 2002, and performs DJ sets at numerous clubs and festivals internationally. In September 2015, he left Coronation Street after ten years of acting, to film new episodes of Red Dwarf and to continue his BBC Radio 6 Music and BBC Radio 2 broadcasting.

== Early life and education ==
Craig Joseph Charles was born in Liverpool on 11 July 1964, the son of a Guyanese father and Irish mother. He grew up on the Cantril Farm housing estate.

He attended West Derby Comprehensive School, where he and his brother were the only Black students. He then went to Childwall Hall College of Further Education, studying A-levels in History, Government & Politics, English Literature and General Studies. He won a national competition run by The Guardian newspaper for a poem he wrote when he was 12 years old. Upon leaving school, Charles spent time working in a studio at Central Hall on Renshaw Street in Liverpool.

== Early career ==
Charles began his career as a contemporary and urban performance poet on the British cabaret circuit. His performances were considered original, with Charles described as having a natural ironic wit which appealed to talent scouts. In 1981, Charles climbed on stage at a Teardrop Explodes concert and recited a humorous, but derogatory, poem about the band's singer, Julian Cope. Charles was invited to open subsequent gigs for the group, and went on to perform as a support act in pubs and clubs for the following three years, and at events such as the Larks in the Park music festival at Sefton Park (1982). He performed poetry, reading poems by Vladimir Mayakovsky, W. H. Auden and E. E. Cummings, at Liverpool's Everyman Theatre (1983), with such poets as Roger McGough and Adrian Henri.

Charles was involved in the Liverpool music scene, writing and singing lyrics for a number of local rock bands. In 1980, he played keyboards, bass and provided voice in the rock band Watt 4. He performed his political rap lyrics as a 'Wordsmith'. In 1983, Charles was invited to record a session on the John Peel BBC Radio show, performing his poems backed by a band. This was his first professional engagement. He recorded a further Peel Session in 1984.

Charles realised he was using poetry as a vehicle for his sense of humour, and progressed into stand-up comedy. He was part of the Red Wedge comedy tour in 1986, which aimed to raise awareness of the social problems of the time, in support of the Labour Party. He also performed his first one-man show in 1986, which premiered in Edinburgh, and then toured internationally. Charles was a guest on programmes including Janice Long's Radio 1 show, and he was a regular panellist on Ned Sherrin's chat show Loose Ends (1987–88) on BBC Radio 4.

== Television career ==
=== Performance poetry ===
Charles first appeared on television as the resident poet on the arts programme Riverside on BBC2 and on the day-time BBC1 chat show Pebble Mill at One. Charles was the resident poet on the Channel 4 programme Black on Black (1985) and its entertainment-based successor Club Mix (1986), and he appeared, weekly, as a John Cooper Clarke-style 'punk poet' on the BBC2 pop music programme Oxford Road Show (ORS). Charles performed his political poems as stand-up comedy on the late-night show Saturday Live (1985–87) and on the prime-time BBC1 chat show Wogan (1986–87), where he performed a topical poem in a weekly feature. He also appeared as a guest on shows including Open Air (1988). Charles included significant acting in his performance style, enabling him to put the emotion across. In September 2015, Charles performed his "epic" poem Scary Fairy and the Tales of the Dark Wood live with the BBC Philharmonic orchestra, in a concert to be broadcast on BBC Radio 2's Friday Night Is Music Night at Halloween.

=== Red Dwarf ===
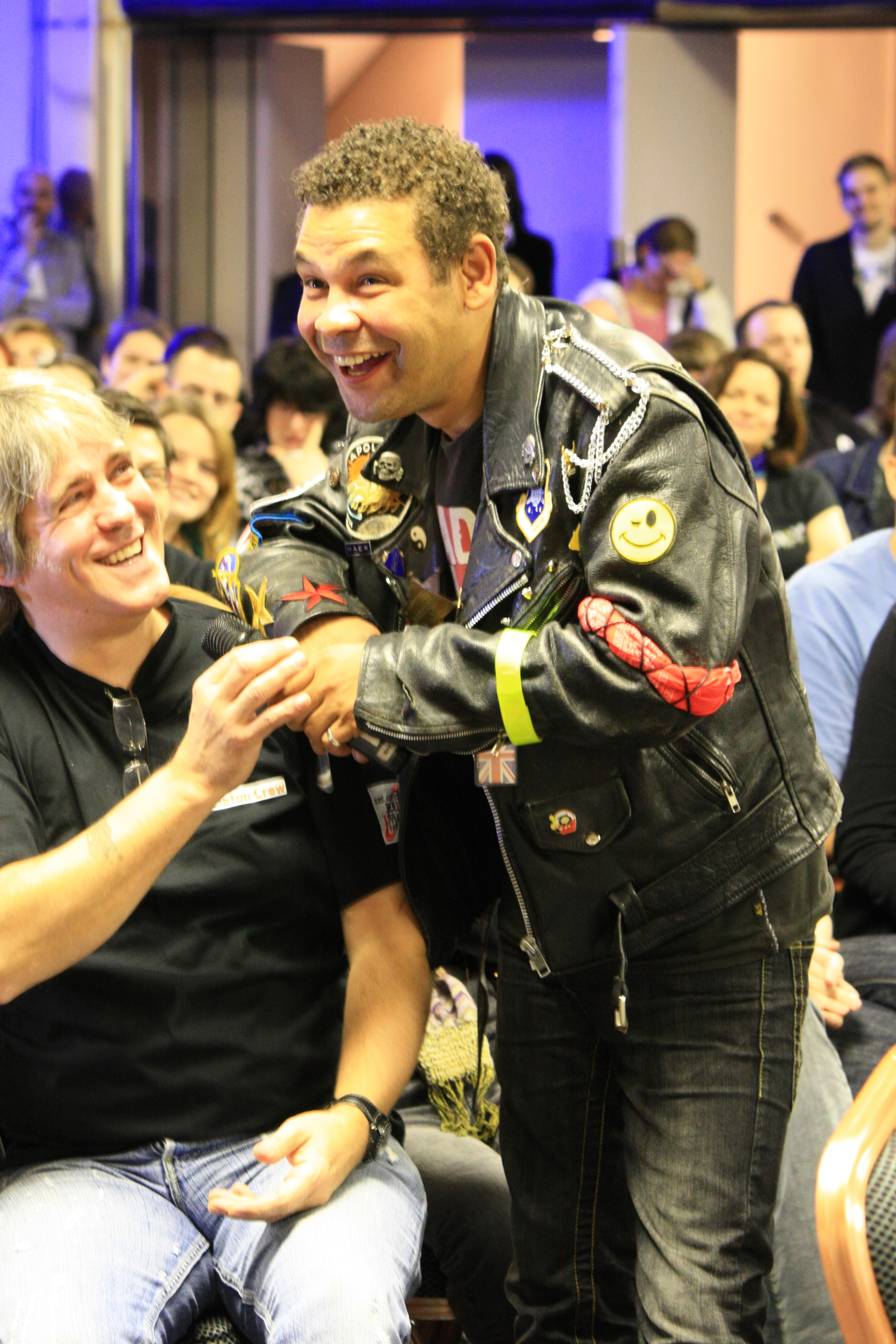
Craig Charles in 2009

Charles' first television acting role was the Liverpudlian slob Dave Lister in science fiction comedy series Red Dwarf starting in 1988. He was introduced to the show by Saturday Live and Red Dwarf producer Paul Jackson, who wanted his opinion on whether the black character Cat was a racist stereotype. Charles, who like all of the eventual main cast had no acting experience, was eventually offered an audition after begging Jackson.

Charles has appeared in all twelve series, as well as Red Dwarf: The Promised Land (2020). Charles' younger brother, Emile Charles, guest-starred in the third-series episode "Timeslides", and the songs "Bad News" and "Cash" in this episode were written by Charles and performed by his band. The role has involved Charles playing a variety of alternative characters, including a gangster, a cowboy and angelic and evil versions of Lister, and in him carrying out a wide range of stunts, and acting involving special effects. All series, except 7 and 9, were recorded in front of a studio audience. Along with Danny John-Jules (Cat), Charles is one of only two cast members to appear in every episode of Red Dwarf to date.

Charles reads the audiobook editions of both the Red Dwarf novel Last Human and his book The Log: A Dwarfer's Guide to Everything, and he regularly attends sci-fi, comedy and memorabilia conventions in connection with the Red Dwarf franchise. During Back to Earth, Lister visits the set of Coronation Street, where he meets the actor Craig Charles.

=== Robot Wars ===
Charles presented Robot Wars on BBC2 (1998–2003) and Channel 5 (2003–04), from series 2 until series 7, which included two Extreme series and numerous 'specials'. Charles was the main host and presided over the arena in which teams of amateur engineers battled their home-made radio-controlled robots against each other, and against the house robots. Charles introduced the show, enthusiastically announced the results of the battles and spoke to the contestants after the main events. He ended each episode with a short Robot Wars-themed poem. Charles' son, Jack, appeared on the show on several occasions, and was a contestant on "Team Nemesis" during series 4. Charles also hosted the Robot Wars Live UK tour, in 2001 and shows performed at the Wembley Arena.

Robot Wars returned to the BBC in 2016. Charles stated his interest in hosting it again, but the job went to Dara Ó Briain and Angela Scanlon.

=== Takeshi's Castle ===
Charles provided the English voice-over commentary for the Challenge (2002–04) rebroadcast of the popular game show Takeshi's Castle, originally by Tokyo Broadcasting System in Japan. In each episode, between 100 and 142 contestants attempted to pass a series of wacky and near-impossible physical challenges to reach the Show Down at the castle against Japanese actor Takeshi Kitano for a chance to win large cash prizes. Charles co-wrote the programme and commentated throughout all 122 episodes of the four series, and also some special and "best of" episodes. He provided comedy insights into the contestants' abilities, which were designed to appeal to adult audiences, as well as younger viewers – and also coined the term "Keshi Heads" to describe fans of the show. Charles was approached to return for a 2013 reboot, to which he said yes, but he was instead replaced by Dick and Dom, and it was not well received.

=== Coronation Street ===
In 2005, Charles joined the main cast of Coronation Street, playing a philandering taxicab driver, Lloyd Mullaney. Charles introduced aspects of the character himself, making Lloyd a Northern soul DJ and record collector, and funk music enthusiast. Charles has chosen funk and soul songs playing as backing tracks during scenes, and posters for The Craig Charles Funk & Soul Club and Red Dwarf have appeared in the background.

Charles portrayed Lloyd as tough, but kind-hearted and romantic, and the character was popular with viewers. Charles added a comedy element to the role, but was also involved in traumatic and emotional scenes with intricate storylines. In 2010, his character was involved in the show's dramatic 50th anniversary tram crash storyline, which was broadcast live. Charles presented documentaries for the show, including 50 Years of Corrie Stunts (2010), which is included on the Tram Crash DVD. In November 2011, Charles took time off from Coronation Street to film a new series of Red Dwarf, returning in April 2012. In February 2014 an online mini-series, Steve & Lloyd's Streetcar Stories, ran alongside the television show's storyline.

In May 2015, Craig announced he would be leaving Coronation Street for Red Dwarf, BBC Radio 2 and BBC Radio 6 Music. Lloyd left in a red Cadillac during the live episode on 23 September, although his final pre-recorded farewell scenes with Steve were shown during the following episode.

=== Other acting roles ===
Charles has acted in episodes of popular dramas such as The Bill (1995), EastEnders (2002) and Holby City (2003) and in the comedy The 10 Percenters (1996). Charles played the emotionally disturbed and violent prisoner, Eugene Buffy, in the highly successful Lynda La Plante drama series The Governor (1996); the title role in the Channel 4 pirate sitcom Captain Butler (1997); the warden of a women's prison in the Canadian sci-fi fantasy Lexx (2001); Detective Chief Inspector Mercer in seven episodes of the BBC soap opera Doctors (2003); and soccer agent, Joel Brooks, in the Sky TV football soap Dream Team (2004).

=== Other presenting roles ===
Charles presented the Video View segment of Night Network (1987), where four celebrities were invited each week to watch new pop music videos, press a big red button once they had seen enough, and give their opinions on the video afterwards. Charles has also presented children's television programmes, including What's That Noise? (1989) and Parallel 9 (1992) on BBC1 and Go Getters (1994) on ITV. He was the travelling reporter for the highly acclaimed, but controversial, BBC 'mockumentary' Ghostwatch, which tricked viewers into believing it was a live investigation into ghost sightings in a suburban home on Halloween night (1992). Charles presented the virtual reality game show Cyberzone (1993) on BBC2; the late-night entertainment show Funky Bunker (1997) on ITV; the reality show Jailbreak (2000) on Channel 5; the discussion show Amazing Space: The Pub Guide to the Universe (2001) on National Geographic; and the late-night current affairs chat show Weapons of Mass Distraction (2004) on ITV.

=== Other appearances ===
Charles has appeared on celebrity editions of University Challenge (1998), Can't Cook, Won't Cook (1998), The Weakest Link (2004), The Chase (2012) and Pointless (2013), and comedy panel shows such as Have I Got News for You (1995), Just a Minute (1995) and They Think It's All Over (1996) and Keith Lemon's Through the Keyhole (2014). He was a team captain on the sci-fi quiz series Space Cadets (1997) on Channel 4, which guest-starred William Shatner. Charles has opened The National Lottery Draw (1997) and his home has featured on Through the Keyhole. Charles was a contestant in the Celebrity Poker Club tournament (2004) on Challenge, where he reached the semi-finals, and in the Channel 4 reality game show, The Games (2005), which documented the contestants' intensive training regime and each live Olympic Games-style sporting event.

From 16 November 2014, Charles took part in the fourteenth series of I'm a Celebrity...Get Me Out of Here! However, on 20 November, Charles left the series soon after learning that his brother Dean had died after suffering a heart attack.

In 2026, he was one of the 'All Stars' contestants in series 2 of I'm a Celebrity... South Africa, aired on ITV in April 2026. He finished 4th, to Harry Redknapp 3rd, Mo Farah 2nd, and Adam Thomas 1st.

== Radio ==
As well as his early appearances on shows such as Radio 4's Loose Ends (1987–88) and Kaleidoscope in the early 1990s, Charles could be heard on the London Radio Station Kiss 100 (Kiss FM) as the breakfast show presenter. In 1995, Charles played the Porter in Steven Berkoff's adaptation of Shakespeare's Macbeth on Radio 4.

In 2002, Charles became a DJ on BBC Radio 6 Music, presenting The Craig Charles Funk and Soul Show, on air on Saturday evenings 6 pm to 9 pm, where he plays a diverse range of funk and soul music, from classic tracks to the latest releases, and provides publicity for less familiar bands. Charles has also hosted the station's Breakfast Show (2004), and sits in for other presenters including Andrew Collins, Phil Wilding, Phill Jupitus and Radcliffe & Maconie.

From January until November 2014, Charles also broadcast The Funk and Soul Show live on BBC Radio 2, immediately after his 6 Music show. He regularly sits in for various presenters, and has presented numerous programmes on the station, including The Craig Charles Soul All-Nighter (2011), which he hosted continuously for 12 hours, and the Beatleland (2012) documentary on The Beatles. Charles has also chosen music as a guest of other broadcasters such as Ken Bruce on Radio 2 and Liz Kershaw on 6 Music. Charles covered for Graham Norton on Radio 2's Saturday mid-morning show during Norton's ten-week 2015 summer break. From 16 April 2016 until 18 June 2022, Charles presented the House Party on Saturday nights on BBC Radio 2, with the show airing between 10 pm and midnight. For eight weeks April–June 2020, he also presented Craig Charles At Teatime between 4 pm and 7 pm on weekdays on Radio 6 Music. The show was sometimes billed as Craig Charles Weekend Workout on Fridays.

Since 18 October 2021, Charles has hosted the weekday afternoon show on BBC Radio 6 Music (1 pm – 4 pm). The shows include the "Trunk of Punk" and the "Jar of Ska". In 2023 the weekday show won the Gold Aria award for Best Music Entertainment Show.

== Music ==
Charles has been involved in the music industry through much of his career. His bands have included Watt 4 (1980), in which he played keyboards and sang; Craig Charles and the Beat Burglars (1989); The Sons of Gordon Gekko (1989), where he wrote lyrics and also composed tunes; and The Eye (2000–02), with whom he recorded the rock album Giving You the Eye, Live at the Edinburgh Festival. Charles plays guitar and piano.

In 1987, Charles provided the poem track used for the opening credits of the BBC series The Marksman (in which he also acted), which is included on the album "The Marksman: Music from the BBC TV Series". Charles wrote lyrics for Suzanne Rhatigan's album To Hell with Love (1992). In 1993, Charles was signed to the Acid Jazz record label.

In 2009, Charles formed the Fantasy Funk Band from the leading British musicians in the genre, and has presented the band at festivals, including Glastonbury and the BBC's Proms in the Park. As a continuation of his 6 Music show, Charles regularly takes the Craig Charles Funk & Soul Club to varied venues across the UK and abroad, and to the major UK music festivals. He performs live DJ sets, occasionally comperes and curates events, including his own Craig Charles Fantasy Weekender, and has broadcast the radio show live from festival locations.

In 2012, Charles released the compilation album The Craig Charles Funk & Soul Club, on CD and as a digital download, as part of a three-album deal with Freestyle Records. The second volume was released in the same format in 2013, and the third in 2014. He followed these with a Craig Charles Funk and Soul Classics album of three CDs in 2015.

== Stand-up comedy and theatre ==
Charles returned to stand-up comedy between 1995 and 2001, regularly touring his one-man adult-rated shows nationally and releasing the videos Craig Charles: Live on Earth! (1995), Live Official Bootleg (1996) and Sickbag (2000). International performances included the Great Norwegian Comedy Festival and the Melbourne International Comedy Festival.

Charles appeared in the John Godber comedy play Teechers, in which he swapped in and out of various roles, at the Arts Theatre, London, and at the Edinburgh Festival (1989), and he played Idle Jack in the pantomime Dick Whittington, at the Hull New Theatre (1997). In 2000, he performed the show Craig Charles and His Band at the Edinburgh Festival.

In 2016 Charles had a slot at Butlin's Minehead House Of Fun Weekend every third November for three nights of DJing, Comedy and live bands.

== Film roles ==
Charles played Eddie in the 1987 political drama Business as Usual. In 2006, Charles starred in two British feature films: the fantasy film Fated and the gangster film Clubbing to Death. Charles voiced Zipper the Cat in the animation Prince Cinders (1993) and Asterix in Asterix Conquers America (1994). Roles in short films include playing Keith Dennis in the comedy The Colour of Funny (1999) and Mark in the drama Ten Minutes (2004).

== Writing ==
In 1993, Charles worked with Russell Bell on the Craig Charles Almanac of Total Knowledge, writing about his 'streetwise' sense of humour on a range of topics. In 1997, Charles and Bell wrote Charles' Red Dwarf character's book The Log, in which Lister decides to leave a log detailing mankind's greatest achievements.

In 1998, Charles published No Other Blue, a collection of his poetry, with illustrations by Philippa Drake Ford. More recently, He has also written a series of nursery rhymes titled Scary Fairy and the Tales of the Dark Wood.

In 2000, Charles wrote his first autobiography about his experiences growing up in Liverpool, titled No Irish, No Niggers. In 2007, he announced he would release his autobiography, planned for March 2008, published by Hodder Headline and titled On the Rocks, which would cover the recent incidents in his life and be based on much of his journal, which Charles said he kept while in rehab.

Charles has been involved in journalism and has had a column in Time Out magazine. In 1994, he launched a single issue of Comedy magazine with articles dedicated to the comedy circuit. In 2005 and 2006, Charles was a monthly columnist for the Liverpool Echo newspaper.

His television writing credits include The Easter Stories (1994), Funky Bunker (1997) and Takeshi's Castle (2002).

He is also involved in music journalism, as he wrote liner notes for the funk and soul music producer Mr. Confuse for his albums Feel The Fire (2008), Do You Realize (2012), and Only A Man (2018) regarding his work as a music presenter for The Craig Charles Funk and Soul Show on BBC Radio 6 Music.

== Personal life ==
As of 2022 Charles resides in Ashley, Cheshire. He has three children: a son from his first marriage to actress Cathy Tyson, and two daughters from his second marriage to Jackie Fleming.

In July 1994, Charles and another man were charged with rape and four counts of indecent assault, following allegations by an associate and ex-girlfriend of Charles. Charles was remanded in custody for three-and-a-half months before being granted bail, during which time he was assaulted by a man wielding a makeshift knife. In March 1995, Charles and his co-accused were acquitted of all charges at trial. After being acquitted, Charles spoke of the need to restore anonymity for those accused of rape. He stated: "The fact that my name and address along with my picture can appear on the front of the papers before the so-called 'victim' has even signed a statement proves that anonymity for rape defendants is a must and that the law must be changed."

Charles has battled drug addiction: he described himself in 2015 as "quite an addictive person", trying to find healthier addictions, of which work was one. In June 2006, newspaper allegations of crack cocaine use resulted in Charles being suspended from both Coronation Street and BBC Radio 6 Music. In August, Charles was arrested and released on bail pending further enquiries, and in September he accepted a caution for possession of a Class A drug. Charles returned to hosting his 6 Music show from November 2006 and filming Coronation Street from January 2007. In a 2015 interview, Charles spoke of his need to remain "vigilant" in abstaining from drugs. In 2020, he said that the newspaper reports were the best thing that could have happened to him, leading him to join Narcotics Anonymous and straighten out his personal life.

== Credits ==
=== Filmography ===
Year	Title	Role	Notes
(early 1980s)	Riverside	Resident poet	Arts review programme
(early 1980s)	Pebble Mill at One	Resident poet	Daily magazine show. Performed in front of Princess Anne
1984	Lift Off	Himself—interviewee	Documentary
1985	Black on Black	Resident poet	Channel 4's first multicultural programme. Including the poem "Halt"
1985–1987	Saturday Live	Himself—stand up	Live poetry stand-up comedy. Series 1: VHS (1986), DVD (2007). Series 2: VHS (1987), DVD (2008)
1986	Club Mix	Resident poet	Entertainment-based successor to Black on Black
1986	Red Wedge	Himself	Stand-up comedy tour
1986	Edinburgh Festival Fringe	Himself—poet	August
1986–1987	Wogan	Himself—poet	Chat show. Co-hosted and performed weekly topical poem on current affairs
1987	Business as Usual	Eddie	Drama feature film. VHS (1988)
1987	Craig Charles	Himself—stand up	Poetry at Assembly Rooms, Edinburgh Festival Fringe, 7–29 August
1987	Night Network	Himself—presenter	TV series; presenter of Video View segment
1987	The Marksman	McFadden	TV drama miniseries, wrote opening poem and played a murderer, aired December
1988	Open Air	Himself—interviewee	Aired 23 February
1988	Craig Goes Mad in Melbourne	Himself—host	Behind the scenes at the International Comedy Festival, 1–11 June
1988	TOR! Total Football	Himself—presenter	Introducing highlights in official film of European Football Championships
1988–1999, 2009, 2012, 2016–2020	Red Dwarf	Dave Lister	All 74 episodes
1989	Daytime Live	Himself—interviewee	Aired 6 January
1989	Teechers	Multiple characters	John Godber stage play
1989	Star Test: Craig Charles	Himself—interviewee	Interviewed by a computer on chat show, aired 18 April
1989	Dogs of War	Voiceover	3D computer video game. Voiced story speech and one character
1989	What's That Noise?	Himself—host	Children's music show
1991	Comic Relief	Dave Lister	Short television film
1991	Them and Us	Himself—host	Consumer rights series
1991	You Bet!	Himself—contestant	Celebrity game show
1992	The Last Cigarette	Himself	Encouraging giving up smoking, aired 8 March
1992	Open to Question	Himself—interviewee	Audience questions from young people on topical issues, 23 March
1992	Parallel 9	Himself	Children's magazine show. Including episode 1.13, aired 18 July
1992	Weather Watch	Himself—presenter	Educational TV series investigating different aspect of the weather
1992	Wogan	Himself	Chat show, 23 October
1992	Ghostwatch	Himself—reporter	Drama, aired 31 October (Halloween). DVD (2002)
1993	That's Showbusiness	Himself—contestant	Quiz show, BBC1, aired 2 February
1993	Cyberzone	Himself—host	All 10 episodes of the world's first virtual reality game show
1993	Cyberpunks and Technophobes	Himself	TV series
1993	A Word in Your Ear	Himself—contestant	Game show, BBC1
1993	Super Mario All Stars	Himself—presenter	Nintendo video game on VHS
1993	Dinosaurs: The Myths & The Reality	Himself—narrator	Animated documentary. VHS (1993), DVD (2006)
1993	Prince Cinders	Zipper the Cat	Voice of character in animated film of Babette Cole's book. VHS (1993), DVD (2007)
1993	Telly Addicts	Himself—contestant	Aired 13 September and 29 December
1993	Pebble Mill	Himself—interviewee	Performed song, 29 October
1993	Funny Stories	Himself—voice	Audiobook anthology of stories for children
1993	The Big Breakfast	Himself—guest presenter	Magazine show
1994	Go Getters	Himself—host	Children's programme
1994	The Easter Stories	Judas Iscariot	Drama series. Episode: "Judas' Tale"
1994	Asterix Conquers America	Asterix (voice)	Animated feature film, English language version
1994	The Word	Himself—interviewee	Late night magazine show
1994	Red Dwarf: Smeg Ups	Dave Lister	Video release (archive footage)
1994	Big Break in Wonderland	Himself—contestant	Charity Christmas special of snooker competition, aired 27 December
1995	Red Dwarf: Smeg Outs	Dave Lister	Video release (new and archive footage)
1995	Breakfast with Frost	Himself—guest	Chat show with Sir David Frost, 5 March
1995	May the 4 Be with You	Himself—presenter	"Starburst Vol. 2" VHS (1996)
1995	Craig Charles: Live on Earth!	Himself—stand up	VHS video release of live stand-up comedy stage show. Also co-producer
1995	Just a Minute	Himself—contestant	TV version of radio panel game, 21 July
1995	Beam Me Up Scotty!	Himself—presenter	Aired 26 August
1995	The Bill	Martin Bailey	Episode: "Honey Pot", 31 October
1995	Have I Got News for You	Himself—contestant	Guest panelist on satire quiz show. Series 10, episode 7, 8 December
1996	Craig Charles Live Official Bootleg	Himself	VHS video documentary of stand-up show
1996	They Think It's All Over	Himself—contestant	Series 2, episode 3, aired 26 March
1996	The Governor	Eugene Buffy	Drama from Lynda La Plante. All 6 episodes of series 2. DVD (2012)
1996	Cyberspace	Himself—narrator	TV series
1996	The 10 Percenters	Bobby Titan	Episode: "Revenge" playing a rap singer
1997	The Big Breakfast	Himself—guest	Aired 6 January
1997	Night Fever	Himself—contestant	Pop music quiz including singing
1997	Captain Butler	Captain Butler	All 6 episodes
1997	Bully: Ha Bloody Ha	Himself—interviewee	Educational show discussing celebrities' memories of school bullies, aired 28 August
1997	Pulling Power	Himself—guest	Motoring show, aired 24 September
1997	Space Cadets	Team captain	Comedy sci-fi quiz, all 10 episodes
1997	Funky Bunker	Himself—host	Late night chat show. 13 episodes. Also co-writer
1997	The National Lottery Live	Himself—presenter	Opened the draw, 5 November
1997	English Express Language Skills	Himself—presenter	Schools education series
1997–1998	Dick Whittington and His Wonderful Cat	Idle Jack	Pantomime stage play
1998	Can't Smeg, Won't Smeg	Dave Lister—contestant	Special edition of Can't Cook, Won't Cook, aired 14 February
1998	Universe Challenge	Himself—contestant	Special Red Dwarf edition of University Challenge, aired 14 February
1998	Children in Need	Dave Lister	Red Dwarf short episode
1998	The Selfish Crocodile	Narrator	Audiobook edition of children's book
1998	Fully Booked	Himself—interviewee	Magazine show
1998–2004	Robot Wars	Himself—host	Series 2–7 (after replacing Jeremy Clarkson)
1999–2000	Ripley's Believe It or Not!	Himself—host	UK presenter
1999	The Colour of Funny	Keith Dennis	Short comedy film
1999	The Comedy Trail: A Shaggy Dog Story	Dave Lister	TV special
2000	Craig Charles: Sickbag	Himself	VHS video release of live stand-up comedy show
2000	Craig Charles and His Band	Himself	Edinburgh Festival, August. Recording album Giving You The Eye
2000	Jailbreak	Himself—host	Reality challenge show
2001	Top Ten TV Sci-Fi	Himself—interviewee	Documentary
2001	Porridge Selection Box	Himself	Worldwide VHS video release. Introduced clips
2001	Lexx	The Warden	Canadian sci-fi series. Episode: "P4X" Hattie Hayridge from Red Dwarf as his wife. Series 4, Vol. 1 DVD (2001)
2001	Don't Walk	Narrator (voice)	Short film
2001	Amazing Space: The Pub Guide to the Universe	Himself—host	Discussion series with guest experts on space related topics
2002	EastEnders: Ricky and Bianca	Vince	EastEnders spin-off drama, aired 20 May
2002	The Saturday Show	Himself—interviewee	Magazine show, 1 June
2002–2004	Takeshi's Castle	Himself—commentator	UK voiceover of Japanese comedy challenge show. Also co-writer
2003	The Sitcom Story	Himself	TV documentary
2003	Sushi TV	Himself—narrator	UK version of Japanese TV clip show (after replacing Julian Clary)
2003	Doctors	DCI Mercer	7 episodes of soap opera
2003	Monstrous Bosses	Himself—presenter	Links between clips in a battle between two comedy characters, 10–11 May
2003	Lovable Rogues	Himself—presenter	Links between clips, aired 3 August
2003	Holby City	Adrian Summers	Episode: "Full Circle", aired 16 December
2004	Ten Minutes	Mark	Short comedy film, launched at the BAFTA and Cannes Film Festival in 2003. Film release July 2004
2004	Britain's Best Sitcom	Himself	TV documentary
2004	Weapons of Mass Distraction	Himself—presenter	Satirical comedy chat show exploring tabloid newspaper world
2004	Celebrities Disfigured	Himself (disguised)	Documentary exploring attitudes to disfigurement, aired 17 April
2004	The Weakest Link	Himself—contestant	Charity edition of quiz show. "Stars of the '90s". Reached 3rd place, aired 4 August
2004	Comedy Connections	Himself—interviewee	Documentary episode on Red Dwarf, aired 30 August
2004	Public Opinion	Himself—interviewee	Panel show, opinions on celebrities from members of the public, aired 21 September
2004	Celebrity Poker Club	Himself—contestant	Challenge, series 3, reached semi-finals
2004	Dream Team	Joel Brooks	Soccer agent in Sky TV football drama
2005	Forty Years of Fuck	Himself—interviewee	BBC documentary examining swearing on TV
2005	The Games	Himself—contestant	Reality game show for charity, based on the Olympic Games. Series 3.
2005	Athletes in Training	Himself—contestant	Live feed, following The Games contestants through their intensive training regime
2005–2015	Coronation Street	Lloyd Mullaney	Principal cast in soap opera, first appearance 20 June 2005
2006	Fated	Pedro	Feature film. DVD (2011)
2006	Clubbing to Death	Carl Begsley	Feature film. Not yet released (in post production)
2008–present	The Craig Charles Funk & Soul Club	Himself—DJ	Live DJ performances throughout the UK, and occasionally abroad
2009	Carpool	Himself—interviewee	Video-podcast interview by Robert Llewellyn of Red Dwarf
2010	UK Festival Awards	Himself	Hosted award ceremony at The IndigO2, London, 18 November
2010	Robert Llewellyn's Carpool	Himself—interviewee	Chat show. Episode 1.5: aired 2 December
2010	50 Years of Corrie Stunts	Himself—voiceover	Coronation Street documentary, aired 6 December. On Tram Crash DVD (2010)
2011	Zombie Carnage	Frank	Promotional trailer for feature film
2011	Cast Mates	Himself	Coronation Street online Q&A, 31 August
2011	This Morning	Himself—Interviewee	Daytime entertainment show, 6 September
2012	BBC Breakfast	Himself—Interviewee	News programme, 10 March
2012	Loose Women	Himself—Interviewee	Chat show, 15 March
2012	Motorbike Diaries: Mad in the Med	Himself—narrator	Travel documentary series from Danny John-Jules of Red Dwarf
2012	Evidently... John Cooper Clarke	Himself—interviewee	Documentary on the poet John Cooper Clarke's life and career, aired 30 May
2012	This Morning	Himself—interviewee	Chat show, 6 July
2012	Loose Women	Himself—interviewee	Chat show, 25 September
2012	The Alan Titchmarsh Show	Himself—interviewee	Chat show, 28 September
2012	We're Smegged	Himself—interviewee	Documentary on the making of Red Dwarf X. On series X DVD, released 19 November
2012	This Morning	Himself—interviewee	Chat show, 19 November
2012	The Craig Charles Funk & Soul Club	Music compiler	Compilation album, released on Freestyle Records as CD and digital download, 26 November
2012	The Chase	Himself—contestant	Celebrity edition of quiz show for 'Text Santa' charity appeal, ITV1, 21 December
2013	Glastonbury Festival	Himself—presenter	Introduced acts (also interviewed musicians and performed DJ set), BBC Four, 28–30 June
2013	Proms in the Park	Himself	Presented the Fantasy Funk Band at the BBC Proms, Hyde Park, London, 7 September
2013	Pointless Celebrities	Himself—contestant	Charity edition of quiz show, with Danny John-Jules from Red Dwarf, BBC1, aired 17 August
2013	Craig Charles Fantasy Weekender	Himself	Funk and soul music festival, Bristol, 24–26 August
2013	This Morning	Himself	'Take a Moment' appeal, ITV1, 25 September
2013	Surprise, Surprise	Himself	With Simon Gregson and Sue Cleaver of Coronation Street, ITV1, 27 October
2013	The Craig Charles Funk & Soul Club 2	Music compiler	Compilation album, Freestyle records, released 25 November
2014	Steve & Lloyd's Streetcar Stories	Lloyd Mullaney	Coronation Street mini-series, online, 3–12 February
2014	BBC Radio 6 Music Festival	Himself	Introduced acts, presented radio, DJ set, poetry performance at Festival Fringe, 1 March
2014	Lorraine	Himself—interviewee	Chat show, ITV1, 28 April
2014	I'm a Celebrity... Get Me Out of Here	Himself—contestant	Game show, withdrew on day 4 for personal reasons
2014	Keith Lemon's Through the Keyhole	Himself—panellist	ITV1 game show
2014	The Craig Charles Funk & Soul Club 3	Music compiler	Compilation album, Freestyle records, released 24 November
2015	Craig Charles Funk and Soul Club Classics	Music compiler	Compilation album box set, Sony Music, released 18 September
2015	Witches, Wizards and Scary Fairies	Himself—narrator	Live performance of Scary Fairy poetry with the BBC Philharmonic Orchestra, 29 September
2015	BBC Breakfast	Himself—interviewee	BBC One news programme, 17 September
2015	The One Show	Himself—interviewee	BBC One chat show, 30 September
2016	Celebrity Home Secrets	Himself	Series 1, Episode 2, 5 September
2017–2022	The Gadget Show	Co-host alongside Jon Bentley, Ortis Deley and Georgie Barrat	Series regular
2021	Who Wants to Be a Millionaire? Celebrity Special	Himself—contestant	Series 37
2021–2022	Moneybags	Host	Channel 4 quiz show
2022	Craig Charles: UFO Conspiracies	Co-presenter; with Sarah Cruddas	Sky History documentary series
2025	Zombie Apache	Liverpool Joe	Comedy Horror film by Writer/Director Charles Maxwell
2026	I'm A Celebrity South Africa	Himself	Series 2

=== Radio ===
Year	Programme	Role	Notes
1983	John Peel Show	Himself—guest	Recorded 6 poems during "Peel Session", aired 17 March
1984	John Peel Show	Himself—guest	Radio. Recorded 3 song, aired 14 February
1987–1989	Loose Ends	Himself—panelist	Regular guest on Ned Sherrin's chat show
1989	The Steve Jones Show	Himself—interviewee	16 March
1992–1993	The Craig Charles Breakfast Show	Himself—host	Radio show
1995	Macbeth	The Porter	Steven Berkoff's Macbeth, aired 28 December
2002–present	The Craig Charles Funk & Soul Show	Himself—host	First broadcast 15 March 2002
2004	Craig Charles Breakfast Show	Himself—host	
2005	One Nation Under a Groove	Himself—presenter	Radio 2 documentary. The Story of George Clinton & P-Funk, aired 12 February
2011	The Craig Charles Soul All-nighter	Himself—host	27–28 August
2012	Fantasy Funk Band at Maida Vale	Himself—presenter	Review for BBC Radio 6 Music's 10th anniversary
2012	Beatleland	Himself—presenter	Documentary on the Beatles in Liverpool, aired 10 October
2013	Didn't It Rain: When the Blues came to Britain	Himself—narrator	Music history documentary, BBC Radio 2, aired 24 October
2015	Sarah and Dan's Extra Edition	Himself—interviewee	BBC Radio 5 Live, 24 September
2015	Witches, Wizards and Scary Fairies	Narrator	"Scary Fairy" poetry performance with the BBC Philharmonic orchestra, BBC Radio 2, airs 30 October 2015

== Bibliography ==
=== Published ===
- 1993, Craig Charles Almanac of Total Knowledge (with Russell Bell), Penguin Books
- 1997, The Log: A Dwarfer's Guide to Everything (with Russell Bell), Penguin Books
- 1998, No Other Blue (illustrations by Philippa Drakeford), Penguin Books

=== Unpublished ===
- 2000, No Irish, No Niggers, Penguin Books
- 2008, On the Rocks, Hodder Headline
