= Ortis Deley =

British television presenter

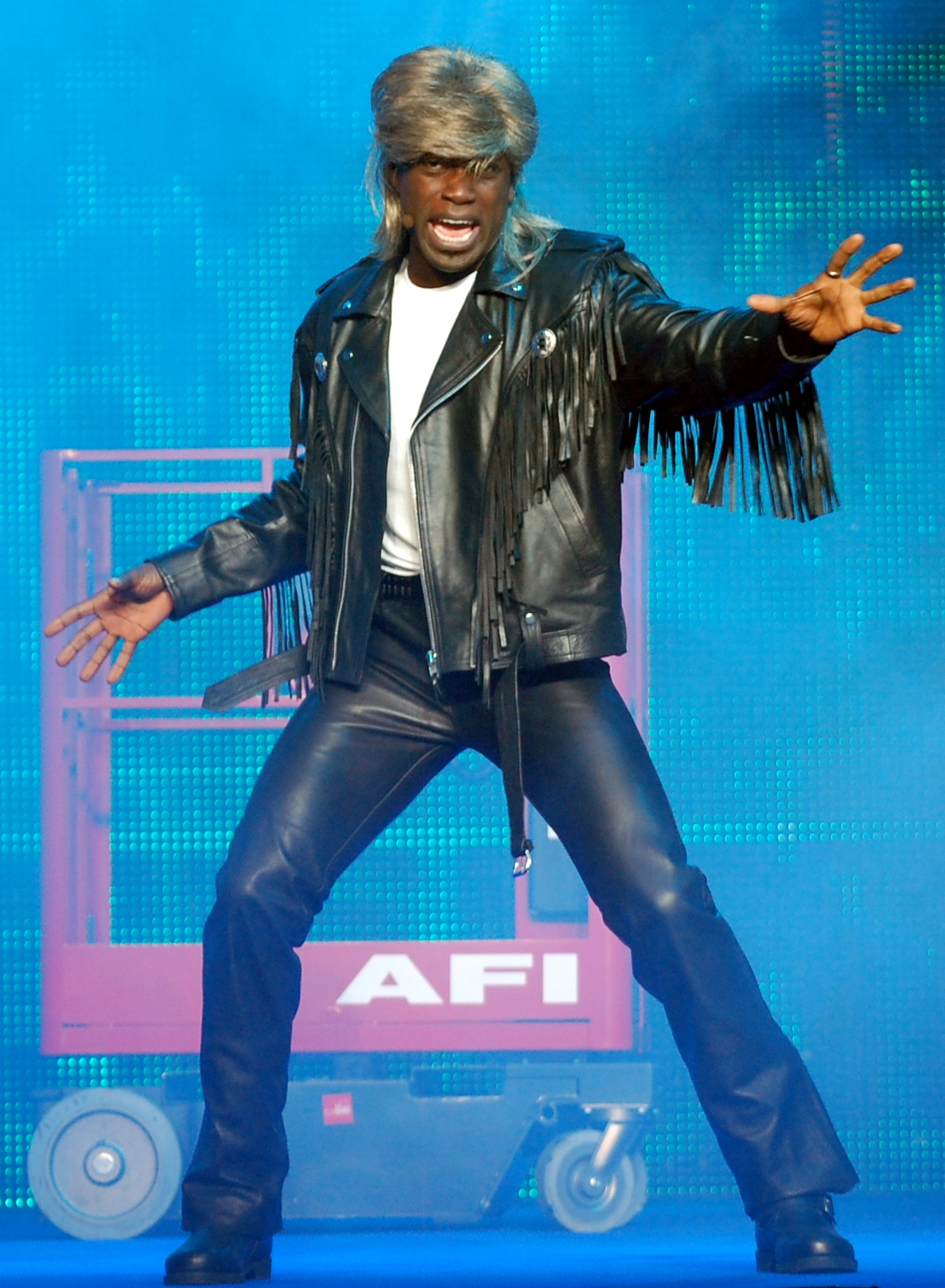
- Deley at the Gadget Show Live 2011
- Born: Balham, London, England
- Occupations: TV presenter, actor, radio DJ
- Children: 2

Ortis Deley (/ˈoʊtɪs/ OH-tis) is a British television presenter, comedian, singer, radio DJ and actor. He is best known for his work as a TV presenter, starting his career in children's TV with shows including Short Change, Live & Kicking and Xchange, and more recently as a presenter of shows such as The Gadget Show and Police Interceptors.

== Early life ==
Deley is of Ghanaian and Nigerian descent. He went to Ernest Bevin College in Tooting Bec, London. Deley studied for a degree in pharmacy at the University of Sunderland and graduated in 1995. During an appearance as a contestant on London Weekend Television's Blind Date, he was talent-spotted by industry manager Jan Simmonds.

== Career ==
=== Acting ===
Deley had a cameo in the 2006 feature film Derailed alongside Clive Owen and Jennifer Aniston. He has starred in the BBC drama serial Doctors and taken part in a production of Alan Ayckbourn's Confusions at the Leatherhead Theatre. He has also played a lead role in the critically acclaimed fringe theatre production of Talkin' Loud at the Latchmere Theatre. In 2005, he played Tom in the Doctor Who spin-off audio plays Wildthyme at Large and The Devil in Ms Wildthyme. In 2006, he appeared as Derek, the brother of Moony, in the low-budget British film Kidulthood. On 3 May 2007, he played the part of a drug dealer on ITV's The Bill. He also played a policeman in the CBBC's series Scoop.

=== LWT ===
Deley's first job in television was for LWT, a pilot Saturday breakfast show entitled Up Your Street, which was followed by Passport to Passion.

=== Trouble TV ===
He found his home as the anchor presenter for the cable & satellite channel Trouble live twice weekly on. He also co-presented It's in the Jeans, a series of 12 shows taking a light-hearted look at how teenagers relate to the opposite sex, as well as chart show Blast, entertainment show The T-Spot and music magazine programme iPop. Throughout the summer of 2000 he made broadcasting history by presenting T-Nation which was the first live broadcast television show from the biggest store in Europe, Topshop on Oxford Street.

Deley toured the country with the Smash Hits Roadshow from 1998 to 2000, interviewing bands for exclusive backstage footage, gossip and news. In 1999 and 2000 he hosted the roadshow itself.

=== BBC ===
Deley worked for Trouble for four years, before joining the BBC to present Short Change and then Live & Kicking. Also in 2001, he appeared on Lily Savage's Blankety Blank.

In 2002, he hosted Making It, the BBC's talent search for a new children's presenter.

He worked as one of the key presenters on CBBC's daily magazine show Xchange.

In 2003, Deley provided the voice of Dongle the Rabbit for CBBC's Be SMART' internet safety game.

He was a presenter in CBBC show Wonderful World of Weird from February to March 2007.

He appeared in an episode of ChuckleVision, which aired on 14 June 2007.

He had a cameo role in British award-winning drama Kidulthood.

For BBC One, Deley presented and reported on monetary and consumer issues affecting children and teenagers for Short Change. He was the main anchor presenter from 1998 to 2005. He also appeared on programmes for BBC Choice (now BBC Three) as one of the main presenters on Hype and Hype on the Road. On BBC One, he has also been the main presenter on a youth science programme, Why 5, which ran for two series. He was also the presenter of CBBC's Sorcerer's Apprentice.

Following this, Deley presented X-perimental, a science series for CBBC produced by Endemol.

On BBC Radio 5 Live, Deley presented his own sports show featuring in depth interviews with British athletes preparing for the Sydney Olympics in 2000.

In 2008, Deley returned to CBBC to co-present Best of Friends.

In 2015 he was among other CBBC presenters to star in the 30th anniversary of CBBC.

=== The Gadget Show ===
In early 2009, Deley joined the popular technology show The Gadget Show as a co-presenter with Suzi Perry, Jon Bentley and Jason Bradbury, making his debut in the "Road Trip Special" episode on 30 January 2009. He replaced Dallas Campbell. In February 2012 it was announced that the show's format was changing to be known as The Gadget Show: World Tour and featured two of the previous presenting team: Jason Bradbury and Pollyanna Woodward.

On 30 January 2014, it was revealed that Deley would be returning to present The Gadget Show.

=== Choice FM ===
In late 2010, Deley started a Sunday-morning slot on London's Choice FM from 9 am to 1 pm.

=== Channel 4 ===
In July 2011 it was announced that Deley would be anchoring Channel 4's live coverage of the IAAF World Athletics Championships from Daegu, South Korea. Deley began on 27 August but struggled to win the audience as many viewers complained about his stilted delivery, reliance on notes, and the mixing up of his colleagues' names.

=== Television ===
- Yo Gabba Gabba – DJ Lance Rock (UK) (2007-2015)
