= Jon Bentley (TV presenter) =

British journalist and television presenter (born 1961)

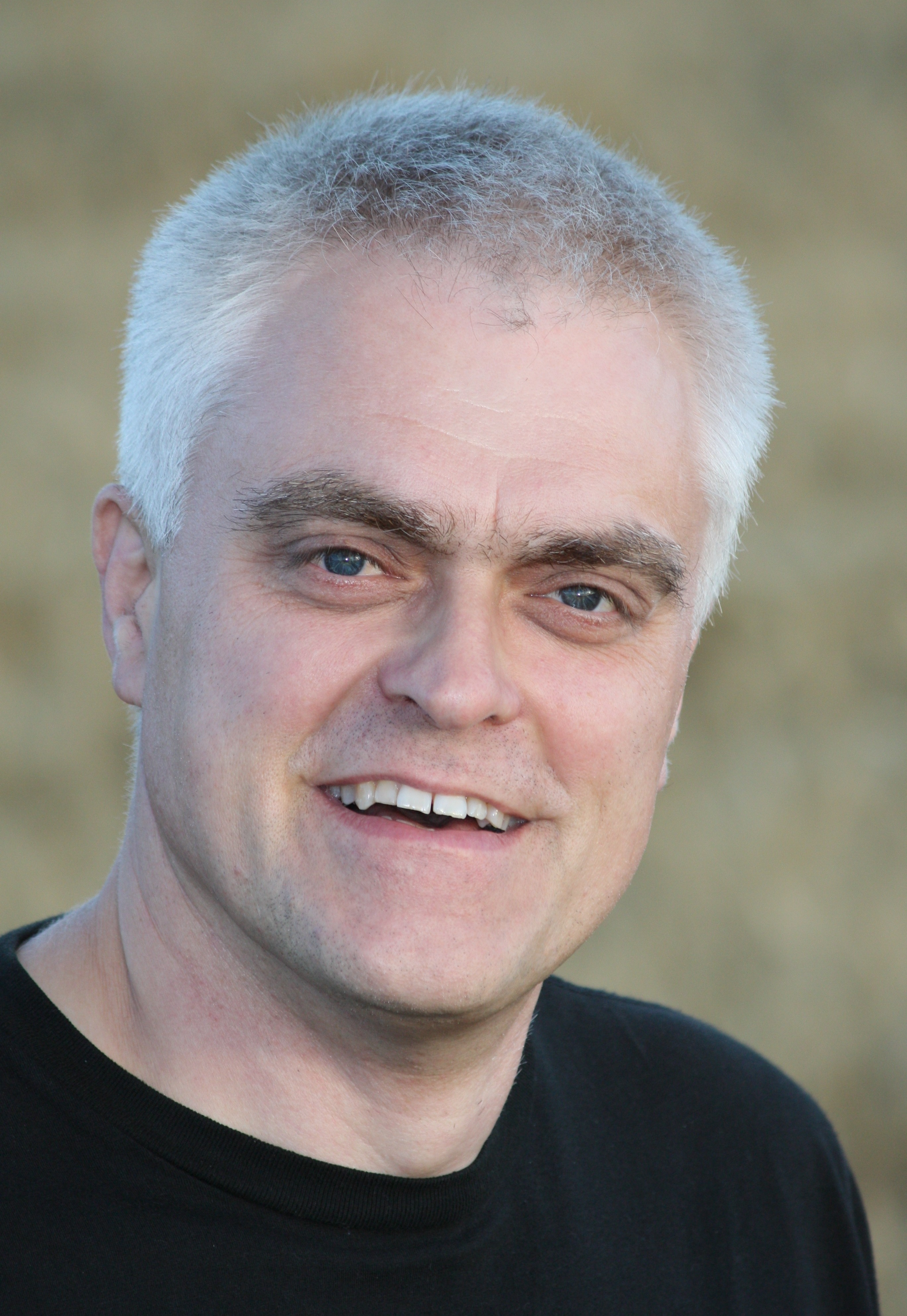
- Bentley in 2008
- Education: Millfield; Oriel College, Oxford
- Occupations: Presenter; journalist; producer
- Known for: The Gadget Show; Top Gear; Fifth Gear
- Spouse: Married
- Children: 2
- Website: jonbentley.com

Jon Bentley is a British journalist and television presenter. He was educated at Millfield in Street, Somerset from 1972 to 1978 and at Oriel College in Oxford from 1979 to 1982, where he studied geography.

Bentley specialises in television production and journalism in the field of motoring. Between 1987 and 1999, he was producer and executive producer of BBC Two's Top Gear, and was series producer of Fifth Gear from 2002 to 2004.

As a producer of Top Gear, Bentley helped launch the television careers of Jeremy Clarkson and hired Quentin Willson and Vicki Butler-Henderson. He also has a corner named after him on the Top Gear test track. Bentley presented The Gadget Show on Channel 5 in the United Kingdom, alongside Ortis Deley, Suzi Perry, Pollyanna Woodward and Jason Bradbury.

In February 2012, it was announced that the show's format was changing, it was then known as The Gadget Show: World Tour, and featured two of the previous presenting team Jason Bradbury and Pollyanna Woodward. Occasionally, he also presented on Fifth Gear.

In April 2013, it was announced on Twitter that The Gadget Show was returning to its old format, and Jon would be rejoining the line up alongside new co-host Rachel Riley, who also attended Oriel College.

He is married with two daughters.
