= Dot.Robot Series =

2009–2011 book series by Jason Bradbury

Dot.Robot
- Dot.Robot, Dot.Robot:Atomic Swarm, Dot.Robot:Cyber Gold
- Author: Jason Bradbury
- Country: United Kingdom
- Genre: Children's, Thriller fiction
- Publisher: Puffin
- Published: 5 February 2009
- Media type: Print (Paperback)

The Dot.Robot Series is a trilogy of techno-thrillers by Jason Bradbury. The series centres on the characters Jackson Farley, Brooke English, the Kojima Twins and Devlin Lear. The first novel in the trilogy was released on 5 February 2009. Its official website is hosted on a server named in the first novel.

== Series ==
=== Novels ===
- Dot.Robot (5 February 2009)
- Dot.Robot: Atomic Swarm (7 January 2010)
- Dot.Robot: Cyber Gold (7 April 2011)

== Characters ==
=== Main characters ===
- Jackson Farley: Jackson Farley is a computer whizz-kid. His favourite computer game is Whisper, which he plays under the alias WizardZombie. He is contacted by Devlin Lear to become a member of MeX, a secret government organisation at the beginning of the first book.
- Brooke English: Brooke English is an American daughter of an Engineer. She spends her time working on self-driving cars and other robotic related projects such as Punk.
- The Kojima twins: The Kojima twins are nine-year-old professional gamers. They have three younger siblings and an overbearing father and mother. They recently won the most prestigious gaming competition in Japan.
- Devlin Lear/Mr. Pope: Devlin Lear is a businessman with a ruthless streak. He is the founder of MeX and disappears at the end of the first book, only to reappear in the second. He is revealed to be Jackson's biological father in "Dot.Robot:Atomic Swarm".
- Yakimoto: A ruthless Japanese Diamond dealer/gang boss, Yakimoto killed both of Jackson's parents.

=== Other characters ===
- Mr. Farley: Jackson's father is a strict parent who is still upset about the death of his wife several years earlier.
- JP English: The father of Brooke English, JP is a professor of robotics at MIT.
- Nathaniel Goulman: JP's lab assistant.

== Critical reception ==
The first novel, Dot.Robot, received generally good reviews with author Eoin Colfer describing it as "The best of a brand new breed of techno-thriller".
