= Don't Scare the Hare =

British game show

- Genre: Game show
- Presented by: Jason Bradbury
- Voices of: Sue Perkins
- Theme music composer: Marc Sylvan; Richard Jacques
- Country of origin: United Kingdom
- Original language: English
- No. of series: 1
- No. of episodes: 9

Production
- Production location: Dock10 studios
- Running time: 35 minutes
- Production company: Initial

Original release
- Network: BBC One
- Release: 23 April – 22 October 2011

Don't Scare the Hare is a 2011 British television game show produced by Initial (a subsidiary of Endemol UK) for the BBC, hosted by Jason Bradbury and narrated by Sue Perkins. The programme was aired on BBC One on Saturday evenings and was first transmitted on 23 April 2011. This series had been planned to run for nine episodes but it was taken off air after six episodes because of poor ratings. The remaining three episodes were rescheduled for broadcast in October 2011.

In the show, contestants must compete in a series of challenges to win £15,000 of prize money; failure to complete questions and physical challenges risks "scaring" a giant robotic hare. The programme has been described by its host as "fantasy based toddler telly with an adult twist". It was the first show to be made at Dock10, MediaCityUK.

== Background ==
The show was piloted at BBC Television Centre in September 2009, with Jason Bradbury as host and Barry Davies providing a live voiceover.

The format underwent further development. In November 2010, the Manchester Evening News reported that television production company Endemol was producing a new game show for Saturday evenings at the area's new dock10 studios. In December, The Guardian reported that a giant robotic hare had been seen at the complex in Salford. Jason Bradbury was named as host in January 2011, while some newspapers identified comedian Miranda Hart as the show's narrator. However, the role went to Sue Perkins.

Announcing Don't Scare the Hare, BBC Entertainment's executive editor Alan Tyler said the show "cleverly captures the spirit and fun of interactive family video games that has been sweeping the nation. [...] We're excited about bringing this experimental new format to early Saturday evenings on BBC One", while Nick Mather, head of entertainment at Endemol called the show "an innovative new format" and said he was "highly excited to be making this large scale studio show for BBC One."

== Overview ==
The programme was presented by Jason Bradbury, who explained to the viewers that he lives in an underground forest with his "mate" the Hare (a giant robotic hare on wheels). He invited the contestants to "do a whole bunch of crazy stuff" (play a few games), but there was one important rule: They must not scare the Hare.

The main part of the show involved two teams of contestants playing three rounds against each other, each round involving a physical challenge. Sometimes these tasks involved a puzzle or memory element which one member of each team must complete. For example, in the first episode the games involved hopping around in sleeping bags to stop alarm clocks from going off, remembering a sequence of lights and using them to "cross" a pond of lilypads, and hooking carrots with fishing rods. A wrong move on any of the tasks would set off a loud noise, "scaring" the Hare, which ran around the studio squeaking and rolling its eyes. Three of these forfeits would lose the contestant that particular round. Noises include ringing alarm clocks and croaking frogs. These games are narrated by Sue Perkins, who is styled as "The Voice of the Forest".

Points were awarded in the form of giant plastic carrots. Completing each of the first two rounds would earn the team three carrots, while the third round was a head-to-head where several points were on offer. Generally this involved a member of each team collecting up to 18 carrots from the Hare's allotment.

The winning team went through to the final round, where they had a chance to play for £15,000. This involved the team members answering a series of multiple choice questions, with each contestant in charge of a plunger which corresponded to an A, B, or C answer. They had to answer three questions correctly, each correct answer allowing the Hare to advance along a course which would eventually trap him. The first correct answer let the Hare into the garden by opening a gate, the second raised a net and the third trapped the Hare, winning the team £15,000. Incorrect answers detonated dynamite; three explosions meant that the team walked away with nothing.

== Games ==
- Alarm-a-geddon: One player from each team had to turn off alarm clocks, which turned themselves on, until the sun rises. If three alarm clocks went off, the Hare was scared and the team won nothing. If the sun rose before Hare was scared, the team won three carrots.
- Allotment Impossible: One player was suspended above Hare's allotment in a harness and had to then collect up to 18 carrots from "electrified" boxes using prongs. Touching the sides of the box forfeited the carrots which had to be returned to Hare's bin. Extracted carrots could be placed in a team's basket.
- Bangers and Smash: A member of each team had to throw apples at a series of fireworks, toppling them before the fuse burns down. If they failed to dislodge the firework before the fuse expires, it exploded frightening the Hare.
- Cash and Carrots: In this final round, qualified teams had to answer three general knowledge questions correctly. The first correct answer let Hare into the garden by opening a gate. The second raised a net and the third trapped Hare, winning the team £15,000. Incorrect answers detonated dynamite - three incorrect mean that teams walked away with nothing.
- Hot Hare Balloons: In this final qualifying round, up to 18 carrots were available. One player sat in a chair suspended by balloons above the Hare's allotment. The player had to take the carrots from the allotment using long hooks, whilst avoiding motion sensitive lasers, putting it in the bin next to their chair. If the lasers were activated, an alarm went off, and the carrots had to be forfeited to Hare's bin.
- Party Poppers: It was Hare's birthday, and his party was missing balloons. One contestant from each team had to maneuver a balloon through a thorn bush without popping it and deliver it to Hare's party. One balloon safe was enough to win three carrots. However, popping all (three) balloons in the thorn bush meant the game was lost.
- Pond Memories: One player from each team had to memorise a sequence of lily pads, which lit up. If they made a mistake, a frog chorus went off, scaring Hare. If the contestant got across all the lily pads without scaring Hare three times, they won three carrots.
- Running Yolk: One player from each team had to transport three eggs across a farm yard obstacle course, first from the chicken coop, through a gate and over some rollers, over a hay bale, over spinning stepping stones and onto egg cups before the bread in a toaster rose. Each new egg was larger in size than the last. Each broken egg scared Hare once - three scares and no carrots. Three eggs and the team won three carrots.
- Vase Attacks: One player from each team had to transport three paintings to hooks on the other side of the room before the time ran out. Each painting was larger than the last. However, in between them and the hooks were fragile vases. Each vase broken scared Hare once - three scares and the player got nothing. Three carrots could be won if all three paintings were hung without scaring Hare or running out of time.
- What's Up Shock: In this final qualifying round, one player from each team had to attempt to take up to 18 carrots from Hare's allotment by taking them from electrified wires. If the ring attached to the carrots hit the wire, the carrots must be forfeited to Hare's bin. Carrots that were won could be deposited in a team's basket.

== Reception ==
The first episode received overnight ratings of 1.93 million viewers, a 15% audience share. Although hot weather was given as a possible reason for the low ratings, it was reported that many viewers were unimpressed with the show, assuming it was a one-off to tie in with Easter (since the tagline used to promote the show was "this year, the Easter Bunny has competition"), and were surprised to learn that more episodes were scheduled to be broadcast. Justin Mason, critic for ATV, said, "I don't think I've quite seen anything like Don't Scare the Hare. I was wondering who on earth dreamt up the idea... it looked like a cheap, children's quiz-show that would be better placed on CBeebies than prime-time BBC One." Jim Shelley of the Daily Mirror was equally as critical, summing up his review as follows: "The idiots playing might have enjoyed themselves but even toddlers would have found the games dull and Jason creepy."

A review in The Stage observed: "The actual games are pretty feeble and uninspired, leaving the poor hare and his robotic novelty value to carry the show. Unfortunately, the hare is far from impressive either. Doctor Who's tin dog K9 managed more personality and manoeuvrability, and he was operating within the confines of seventies technology." John Anson of the Lancashire Post opined: "If you’re going to have a gimmick in your game show at least make it entertaining. Surely this is a programme which would have been ideal for CBeebies. Make the questions simple, involve bunches of kids and hey, presto it works... But primetime Saturday night viewing it ain’t." Digital Spy's Alex Fletcher noted: "Not since the days of Mr Blobby and Ice Warriors have weekends been filled with such peculiar antics."

The second episode, aired on 30 April, achieved an audience of 1.39m (10.5%). By the fourth episode, the viewing audience had declined to 900,000 viewers (a 5.9% audience share). Because the show was so poorly received, BBC One decided to reschedule it to an earlier timeslot, beginning on 14 May. Don't Scare the Hare was moved from 17:25 to 16:40, while the second series of So You Think You Can Dance? – whose ratings also struggled – was aired earlier. The schedule change was spurred on by the broadcast of the 2011 Eurovision Song Contest, which aired on 14 May. On the previous day, 13 May, the BBC had announced that the series would be cancelled after only three episodes had been aired. Speaking about the programme on an edition of BBC Breakfast, the BBC's entertainment controller Mark Linsey said: "Obviously Hare is not going well. It was a huge risk we took – it’s co-hosted by an animatronic hare – and while it’s proved successful with children, we were hoping there would be enough knowingness within the show to draw in the adults. There wasn’t enough of that, which is where it fell down." The final 3 episodes which hadn't aired were rescheduled for October.
