= Captain Butler =

- Title screen for Captain Butler.
- Created by: John Smith & Rob Sprackling
- Written by: John Smith & Rob Sprackling
- Directed by: Ian McLean
- Starring: Craig Charles; Roger Griffiths; Shaun Curry; Lewis Rae; Sanjeev Bhaskar
- Country of origin: United Kingdom
- Original language: English
- No. of episodes: 6

Production
- Producer: Christopher Skala
- Running time: 6x30mins

Original release
- Network: Channel 4
- Release: 3 January – 7 February 1997

Captain Butler is a British sitcom starring Craig Charles as Butler, the captain of a motley crew of pirates which included Roger Griffiths, Shaun Curry, Lewis Rae, and Sanjeev Bhaskar. Created by John Smith and Rob Sprackling, the series ran for only six episodes on Channel 4 in 1997. Its theme tune was the Sex Pistols version of "Friggin' In The Riggin'" (with minor variations by the actors within the series).

== Plot ==
The series is set during the 18th century, sometime between the period known as the 'Golden Age of Piracy' and the Napoleonic Wars, and follows the adventures of a misfit band of pirates led by Captain Butler (Craig Charles). However, the setting intentionally introduces historical anachronisms, as both Blackbeard and Admiral Horatio Nelson are portrayed in the series, and it is difficult to determine the specific time period.

== Characters ==
- Captain Butler (Craig Charles)
- Cliff (Roger Griffiths)
- Bosun (Shaun Curry)
- Roger (Lewis Rae)
- Adeel (Sanjeev Bhaskar)

== Episodes ==
No.	Title	Original release date
1	"Death Is Just Another Word"	3 January 1997
There is not much of a plot in this episode. This show is about a bunch of Pirates who don't do much while out at sea, then one day while bobbing around Rodger (Lewis Rae) throws his stuff on board and asks if he can join the crew. The Captain (Craig Charles) says it is not as easy as that, and Rodger almost gets his throat cut by Bosun (Shaun Curry), until he offers the Captain quite a lot of money. Rodger tells the crew about a Spanish slave ship heading across the Atlantic. Then the crew arrive, with the Captain dressed as an Admiral. Bosun cuts a hole in the side of the boat and after finding out there are no slaves, everyone drowns.
2	"Kiss Me Harder"	10 January 1997
This episode starts off with Rodger reading a girly magazine "Susie" when Butler comes along and asks Rodger what he's reading. While reading "Susie" Rodger reads an article about Nelson. A while later the crew see a ship in the distance, then the crew panic once they find out it is Nelson's ship. Adeel (Sanjeev Bhaskar) spreads some dip and wine about to make it look like they have been attacked. Everyone goes and hides and then Nelson (fellow Red Dwarf actor Robert Llewellyn) comes aboard to see the ship. The Captain then finds out everyone is in the cupboard with the result of the Captain being pushed out right into Nelson's arms. Butler pretends to be dead until Nelson suggests throwing him over the side. Butler makes this Hocus Pocus story about his crew dying while battling the French. While Nelson is communicating with his ship the crew dress as the French and beat Nelson up (Chinese Burn and Poked Eye) then while Hardy is rowing back to the ship comes the famous line "Kiss me Hardy, on the lips".
3	"Desert Island Dick"	17 January 1997
The episode starts with four of the lads playing snap then shot moves to Butler who's looking out at sea with a telescope talking about how the sea is lifeless and empty. Then a while later the ship hits a reef and the crew end up on an uncharted island. Butler tells the crew about a mermaid who carried him to safety, Bosun says that when a mermaid saves you, you get cursed with a love spell. The next day then find an old man on a hill who does not speak English, Adeel says he can understand him but this turns out to be a lie, only Cliff (Roger Griffiths) can talk to this old man. Then Butler finds the mermaid who saved him called "Tray-Sea" or Tracy. Rodger has heard from Bosun how to break the curse but this does not work. But then the crew (except Butler) leave and Butler gets married unknowing that his upper body would be a fish. End result is that he hears that the only way to turn back is to stop loving her, then he swims back to the ship and joins the crew again.
4	"The Tale of the Ancient Mariner"	24 January 1997
The episode starts as Cliff tells a story about a chocolate cottage and a monster then Rodger gets sent to bed. Then Bosun tells the story about a curse that if you killed an albatross you would be cursed. Then Rodger kills one by sending an arrow straight though the heart and landing on deck. The next day the weather is hot - "It's the forces gathering" Bosun says. Then whilst in the cabin a shock on thunder and lightning is heard and Rodger is gone, there is only his hat left on the wheel. Then Butler is in bed when the monsters voice is heard saying "Rodger is dead, then Adeel, then it's you Butler You!". Then after an Eclipse Adeel is gone and a note is left on the sails "Adeel is dead your next Butler"
5	"Kidnapped"	31 January 1997
The crew threaten to mutiny when Butler doesn't start some real pirating but his salvation comes in the unlikely form of sweet innocent Lucy.
6	"Jailhouse Crock"	7 February 1997
Butler and his crew are finally caught and tried for piracy. But is this the end of their adventure?
