= The Gadget Show =

British television series

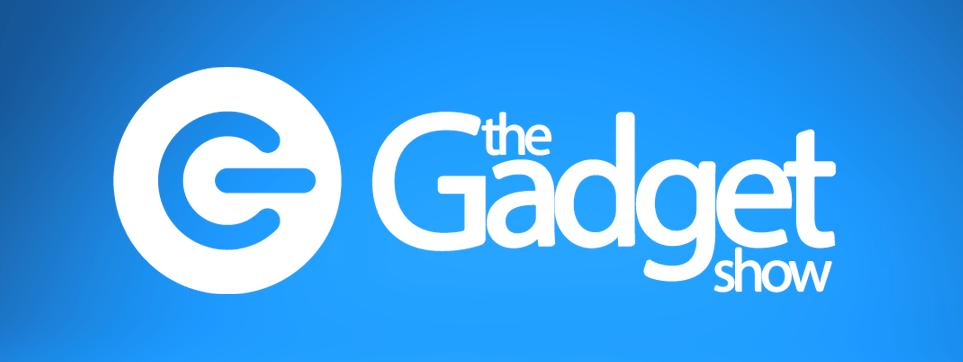
- The 2010 logo for the programme
- Also known as: The Gadget Show: World Tour; The All New Gadget Show; The Gadget Show: Better Tech, Better Life; The Gadget Show: Shop Smart, Save Money; The Good Gadget Guide: Shop Smart, Save Money
- Genre: Review show
- Created by: Ewan Keil; Richard Pearson; James Woodroffe
- Presented by: Suzi Perry; Jason Bradbury; Georgie Barrat; Jon Bentley; Ortis Deley
- Theme music composer: Barrie Gledden (Series 1–16); Suzi Perry (World Tour & All-New Series); Andy Duggan (Series 17–24); Steven Ryder (Series 25–35)
- Opening theme: In The Machine (Series 1–16); Full Funk Force (Series 25–35)
- Country of origin: United Kingdom
- Original language: English
- No. of series: 37 (and 2 other series)
- No. of episodes: 474

Production
- Executive producer: Richard Pearson
- Producer: Steve Li
- Running time: 30 minutes (Series 1–2 and Dave/Discovery Science contracted repeats); 45 minutes (Series 3–6); 60 minutes (Series 7–37)
- Production company: North One Television

Original release
- Network: Channel 5
- Release: 7 June 2004 – 14 July 2023

The Gadget Show is a British television series which focuses on consumer technology. The show, which was broadcast on Channel 5, is presented by Ortis Deley, with reports from Georgie Barrat and Jon Bentley.

Originally a thirty-minute show, it was extended to forty-five minutes, then later to one hour. Repeats have also aired on the digital channel 5Star, syndicated broadcasts on Discovery Science and Dave (in edited down half-hour versions), and Channel 5's on-demand service My5. In Australia, it is broadcast on The Lifestyle Channel. The Gadget Show has received many Guinness World Records.

The show was officially cancelled in September 2023 after airing for 37 series.

== Format ==
=== 2004–2006: Beginnings ===
The show previews and reviews the latest gadgets, and broadcasts the latest technology news. The show is aimed at giving the mass consumer an insight into the gadget world and in addition, it aims to give enough information for the more "geeky" or knowledgeable audience, but still making it accessible to the more casual viewer. The show has featured Blu-rays, video cameras, MP3 players, Internet multimedia tablets and other technologies. A segment showing viewers how to get the most out of their technology was also often included along with a competition to win anything from £5,000 to £45,000 worth of new gadgets. Each series usually contained a special episode focusing on a particular technology conference or expo. Past conferences include CeBIT and the NextFest.

=== 2007–2010: Studio and time increase ===
Series 5 saw a slight tweak in the format, with the three presenters hosting from a studio base, although a lot of the show still took place outside of the studio. The studio sections were filmed at the Custard Factory on Gibb Street in Digbeth, Birmingham, England. This was until a new set was introduced and the studio was then moved to inside The Gadget Show's offices located inside North One Television in Digbeth. A recurring theme in the updated format was a regular challenge between Jason and Suzi (and occasionally Jon and/or Ortis), typically set around particular gadget(s) and their testing or use based around it. Another addition was that now the week's main featured gadget(s), typically reviewed by Jon, was given a 'G rating' from one to five. The seventh series, which started on 29 October 2007, saw the programme promoted to a 20:00 start time (previously 19:15), and running increased from forty-five minutes to one hour.

From series 8, there was also a new "Top 5" feature which consists of the Top 5 gadgets in a certain category. At the start of the eleventh series, a new item was introduced, called the "Wall of Fame" where Ortis or Suzi and Jason picked their favourite gadget from a particular category that they think changed the face of modern gadgetry, and then Jon picked the one to win and go up on the wall. There were also several other recurring features (such as the aforementioned "Top 5", and "The Focus Group" - testing products with various groups of people, who voted for their best one) which were featured in episodes on a semi-regular basis. At this time, the show was broadcasting 38 episodes each year and was one of Channel 5's biggest brands.

Probably the most iconic element of the show at this time was The Gadget Show competition where viewers could win up to 250 gadgets each week, (answering a multiple choice question, by phone, SMS or postal entry).

For 2010, the programme received a rebrand centred on the Museo typeface. This included refreshed titles and break bumpers. Also in 2010, the show saw the release of a supporting magazine called 'The Gadget Show Magazine'. Despite advocating HD content and reviewing high definition television sets, cameras and other devices, the show continued to be broadcast in standard definition, being upscaled on the Channel 5 HD simulcast channel. It would take until the World Tour series for the show to begin broadcasting in native HD.

=== 2012–2013: World Tour revamp ===
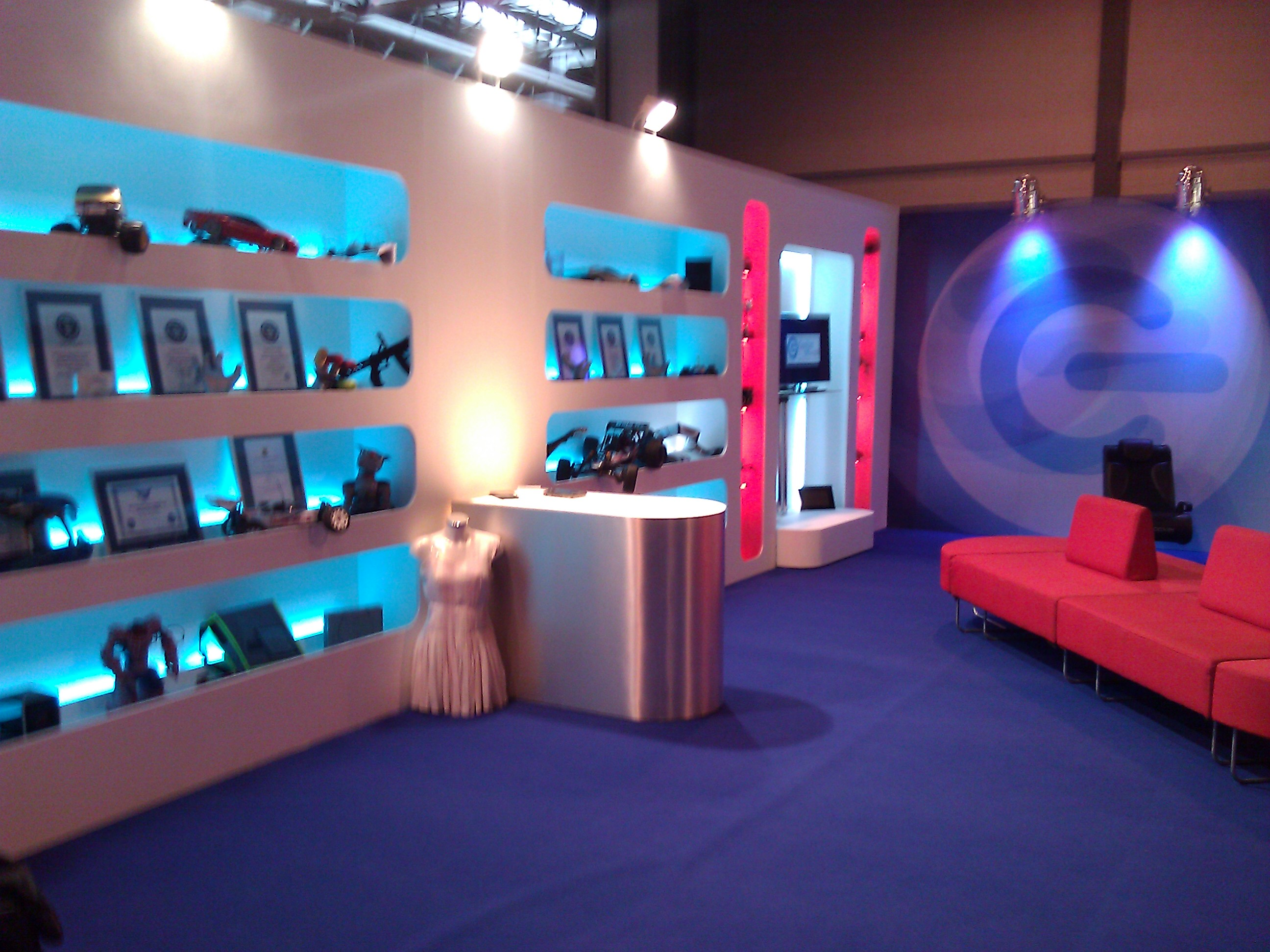
The former Gadget Show set (2012)

In February 2012, it was announced that the show would be in a new, revamped format. It was called The Gadget Show: World Tour, and it started airing on 23 April 2012. The new version of the show saw presenters Jason Bradbury and Pollyanna Woodward travelling the world to test the latest gadgets and partake in a number of challenges. The intention was to reach a wider audience, and while viewing figures stayed high, the reception of the show from its core fans were generally negative, questioning Jon, Ortis and Suzi being dropped from the show.

The next series, under the name The All New Gadget Show, began airing on 5 November 2012. Guests in this series included musical-comedy group Jonny & The Baptists as well as popular YouTube star Ali-A. Two specials aired in Spring 2013, a 'future' special and a 'Bank Holiday' special.

=== 2013–2016: Back to origins, presenter changes ===
For the 17th series, Jason Bradbury and Pollyanna Woodward were joined by Countdown co-presenter Rachel Riley and former Gadget Show presenter Jon Bentley who re-joined the show as chief gadget tester. It was announced that The Gadget Show would return to its more traditional format, with a new studio. On 30 January 2014, it was announced that Ortis Deley would be returning to the show, replacing Pollyanna Woodward. On 25 April 2014, it was announced that Riley would be leaving the show. Riley was replaced by Olympic skeleton gold medallist, Amy Williams.

From the 22nd series, in-studio presenter links were scrapped; so, the filmed inserts were linked by graphics and countdown clips with voiceover from Bradbury, Deley, Williams and Bentley. A new logo and graphics were also introduced. New features included profiles of YouTube creators and vloggers and a section called Gadget Help where viewers of the show can get tech help to solve their problems. For the 23rd series, the show returned to a Friday night slot for the first time since 2011.

=== 2017–2022: Craig Charles, a return to studio links, and Gadget Show Live axed ===
At the end of the 24th series of The Gadget Show, it was announced that Bradbury had decided to quit the show after 12 years. A day later, it was confirmed that Amy Williams would also leave. Furthermore, it was also announced that The Gadget Show Live had been axed in 2017 in favour of a new technology show taking place at Westfield London. The 25th series saw the show have a revamp. Channel 5 were keeping quiet as to what would happen in the new series.

On 17 February 2017, it was announced that Craig Charles and Georgie Barrat would replace Amy Williams and Jason Bradbury for the 25th series and would host alongside Ortis Deley and Jon Bentley. It was also announced that the show would return to a studio base in Birmingham and would air from 10 March 2017 for 12 episodes. The new Gadget Show logo teaser was released on the official Facebook page on 14 February 2017.

The show in its 26th and 27th series continued with the hosts from the 25th series with all studio filming taking place to the south of Birmingham in the 'Studio 212' complex operated by the privately owned company drp.

=== 2022–2023: 'Gadget HQ' era and title changes ===
After series 35, Charles confirmed that he would not be returning to the show. For series 36, the format was changed so that the studio was replaced by on location filming at Gadget HQ, a residential property used by the show, and the focus of the show altered to concentrate on assisting families and households with technological solutions to help their lives including money saving with Wallop and sustainability with new experts Charlotte Williams and Bianca Foley. As part of this, Charles' role was discontinued and a replacement was not put in place. For the new format, the name was changed to The Gadget Show: Better Tech, Better Life. In 2023, the name was changed twice further: a block of programmes airing from March amended the sub-title to The Gadget Show: Shop Smart, Save Money with a further sequence of programmes from 9 June dropped the Gadget Show name after 19 years, adopting the title The Good Gadget Guide: Shop Smart Save Money, retaining the same presenters, opening titles, theme tune and format as the preceding series and as of September 2023 it was announced that Angellica Bell would be joining the presenting team. With Bell's arrival, the Good Gadget Guide title was dropped and the show relaunched as Shop Smart, Save Money. Deley, Barratt and Bentley remained with the programme. In 2024, Bell was replaced by Gaby Roslin, who had been a presenter of Channel 5's previous incarnation of Shop Smart, Save Money in 2018, which was otherwise unconnected to The Gadget Show.

=== 2024: The Gadget Show Podcast and return of original trio ===
In early 2024, the Gadget Show socials began teasing the return of Jason Bradbury and Suzi Perry. It was soon confirmed that the Gadget Show name would be revived as a podcast presented by both Bradbury and Perry, initially available exclusively on Patreon, with a selection of rewards for subscribers, but later on YouTube and other podcast outlets after. Perry thanked fans in a video message after the pilot episode was aired stating that she and Bradbury would be recording more episodes on 8 April and would be joined by Jon Bentley.

=== Guinness World Records ===
During the challenge section of The Gadget Show, the team is sometimes asked to set new Guinness World Records. So far, they have set records for:

- The fastest speed reached by a slot car racer achieved by Dallas Campbell while filming for The Gadget Show.
- The fastest speed reached by an internal combustion powered radio-controlled model car is 137.86 km/h (85.66 mph), controlled by Jason Bradbury (UK) on the set of The Gadget Show in Stratford-upon-Avon, UK, on 29 October 2008.
- The fastest speed in a water jet–powered car is 26.8 km/h (16.65 mph) and was achieved by Jason Bradbury (UK) on the set of The Gadget Show at Wattisham Airfield, Ipswich, UK, on 15 March 2010.
- The longest ramp jump performed by a remote controlled model car is 26.18 m achieved by an HPI Vorza, controlled by Jason Bradbury (UK) on the set of The Gadget Show in Birmingham, UK, on 25 March 2010. (Since been beaten by Thomas Strobel, Germany on 30 July 2011. Setting a distance of 36.9 m.)
- The largest game of Tetris measured at 105.79 m^{2} and was played on The Gadget Show in Birmingham, UK on 15 September 2010.
- The heaviest machine moved using a brain control interface weighs 56.2 tonnes (61.95 tons), as demonstrated on the set of The Gadget Show, Studley (UK) on 17 March 2011.
- The fastest speed attained on a jet-powered street luge is 115.83 mph (186.41 km/h), achieved by Jason Bradbury (UK) on the set of The Gadget Show's 200th episode in Bentwaters Parks, Suffolk, UK, on 9 August 2011.
- The longest loop-de-loop performed by a radio-controlled car at a diameter of 2.3 m.

=== Failed campaigns ===
The show launched a campaign for free WiFi access across the country. Viewers were urged to register their support on the show's website; Jason Bradbury promised to take the issue to 10 Downing Street if the need arose, which it did, but got a reply rejecting his petition after over 30,000 names were sent in.

In 2015, the show (and Worth Capital) also launched a "Future Gadget" competition which gave all budding entrepreneurial tech' inventors a chance to bring their new gadgets to market, with financial backing and advert space on Channel 5 for the overall tech winner. This competition was also to run alongside The Gadget Show Live 2015 in parallel as part of the selection process. This competition itself was terminated early on as the show and Worth Capital felt that the initial entries were not to the highest of standards. (*To date, the show and Worth Capital have not provided any substantive evidence to arguably support their conclusive assessment).

== Series overview ==
Series	Episodes	Broadcast	
Series	Episodes	Premiere	Finale
1	10	7 June 2004	16 August 2004
2	10	14 January 2005	18 March 2005
3	11	3 October 2005	12 December 2005
4	13	30 January 2006	24 April 2006
5	13	18 September 2006	11 December 2006
6	10	12 February 2007	16 April 2007
7	8	29 October 2007	17 December 2007
8	10	31 March 2008	2 June 2008
9	9	9 June 2008	4 August 2008
10	13	6 October 2008	24 December 2008
11	14	30 January 2009	1 June 2009
12	20	3 August 2009	14 December 2009
13	17	1 February 2010	24 May 2010
14	21	2 August 2010	20 December 2010
15	17	14 February 2011	6 June 2011
16	21	19 August 2011	9 January 2012
WT^{1}	6	23 April 2012	28 May 2012
AN^{1}	14	5 November 2012	1 April 2013
17^{1}	9	3 June 2013	29 July 2013
18^{1}	13	14 October 2013	6 January 2014
19^{1}	9	24 February 2014	21 April 2014
20^{1}	15	15 September 2014	19 December 2014
21^{1}	12	2 March 2015	18 May 2015
22^{1}	12	21 September 2015	7 December 2015
23^{1}	12	19 February 2016	13 May 2016
24^{1}	12	7 October 2016	16 December 2016
25^{1}	12	10 March 2017	9 June 2017
26^{1}	12	6 October 2017	22 December 2017
27^{1}	12	9 March 2018	15 June 2018
28^{1}	11	5 October 2018	14 December 2018
29^{1}	14	29 March 2019	5 July 2019
30^{1}	12	4 October 2019	20 December 2019
31^{1}	12	12 June 2020	28 August 2020
32^{1}	12	25 September 2020	11 December 2020
33^{1}	12	5 February 2021	7 May 2021
34^{1}	12	29 September 2021	15 December 2021
35^{1}	12	2 March 2022	27 July 2022
36^{1}	12	28 September 2022	14 December 2022
37^{1}	12	1 March 2023	14 July 2023

=== Notes ===
- ^{Note 1} Series numbers were later changed to exclude the World Tour and All New Gadget Show from current series listing. The series which started airing on 9 March 2018 is listed as Series 27.

== Presenters ==
=== Final presenters ===
- Jon Bentley (2004–2012, 2013–2023)
- Ortis Deley (2009–2012, 2014–2023)
- Georgie Barrat (2017–2023)

==== Experts ====
- Harry Wallop: technology money-saving expert (2017–2023)
- Bianca Foley: sustainability expert (2022–2023)

Note: Jon Bentley is the only original presenter left and is the longest running current presenter.

=== Former presenters ===
- Jason Bradbury (2004–2016) - 329 episodes (including 20 episodes of World Tour)
- Suzi Perry (2004–2012) - 208 episodes
- Tom Dunmore (2004–2006, 2010) - 30 episodes (plus 2 as guest)
- Adrian Simpson (2004) - 4 episodes
- Aleks Krotoski (2004) - 2 episodes
- Spencer Kelly (2005–2006) - 13 episodes
- Dallas Campbell (2008) - 23 episodes
- Gail Porter (2009) - 7 episodes^{2}
- Pollyanna Woodward (2010–2014) - 98 episodes (including 20 episodes of World Tour)
- Rachel Riley (2013–2014) - 31 episodes
- Amy Williams (2014–2016) - 63 episodes (plus 1 as guest in 2010)
- Yue Xu (2015–2016) - 16 episodes (plus 1 as guest in 2014)
- Craig Charles (2017–2022) - 133 episodes
- Maddie Moate (2022) - 1 episode^{3}
- Libby Clegg (2022) - 1 episode^{3}
- Pien Meulensteen (2022) - 1 episode^{3}
- Jordan Erica Webber (2022) - 1 episode^{3}
- Nicola Hume (2022) - 1 episode^{3}
- Grace Webb (2022) - 1 episode^{3}

==== Experts ====
- Jordan Erica Webber: gaming expert (2017–2022) - 75 episodes (plus 1 as guest presenter)
- Charlotte Williams: sustainability expert (2022) - 11 episodes

Notes

- ^{Note 2} Stand-in for Suzi Perry who was suffering ectopic pregnancy
- ^{Note 3} Stand-in for Georgie Barrat who was on maternity leave

=== Gadget Show Web TV ===
- Dionne South (2008–2011) - 101 episodes
- Jon Bentley (2008–2011) - 109 episodes
- Ortis Deley (2009–2010) - 51 episodes
- Pollyanna Woodward (2010) - 11 episodes
- Amy Roff (2009) - 1 episode

== Theme tune ==
The original theme tune used from 2004 to 2011 was composed by Barrie Gledden and was entitled "In the Machine".

In Episode 4 of Series 16, Perry and Bradbury were challenged to create a new theme tune for The Gadget Show which would replace the current one used since the show's first broadcast using only consumer tech. Jason decided that he would use DJing software and equipment to compose his theme, whereas Suzi opted for using apps available on the iPad 2 to compose her version. After the show, viewers were encouraged to vote for their favourite of the two on The Gadget Show's website, with the version receiving the most votes being chosen as the new theme. At the start of the next episode, it was revealed that Suzi's version was chosen by viewers and was first used in the opening titles of that episode.

A revised version of the theme, including 'drumbeat' elements, accompanied the World Tour series.

Between series 17 and 24, a theme credited to Andy Duggan was used. It was similar sonically to the first and third themes, melodically following on from the immediately prior (World Tour) theme but with electronic overtones akin to those of the original music.

Between series 25 to 35, Full Funk Force by Steven Ryder was used as the theme. From series 36, a new theme has been used.

== Website and YouTube channel ==
The Gadget Show website, which now is part of Channel 5's 5FWD website, contains information on topics and products discussed and featured on the show. In addition, the site contains product reviews, how-tos, news, and free 'web episodes', containing extra material not featured on the TV programme.

The Gadget Show also has a YouTube channel which features special behind the scenes videos and Web TV episodes.

== Gadget Show Live ==
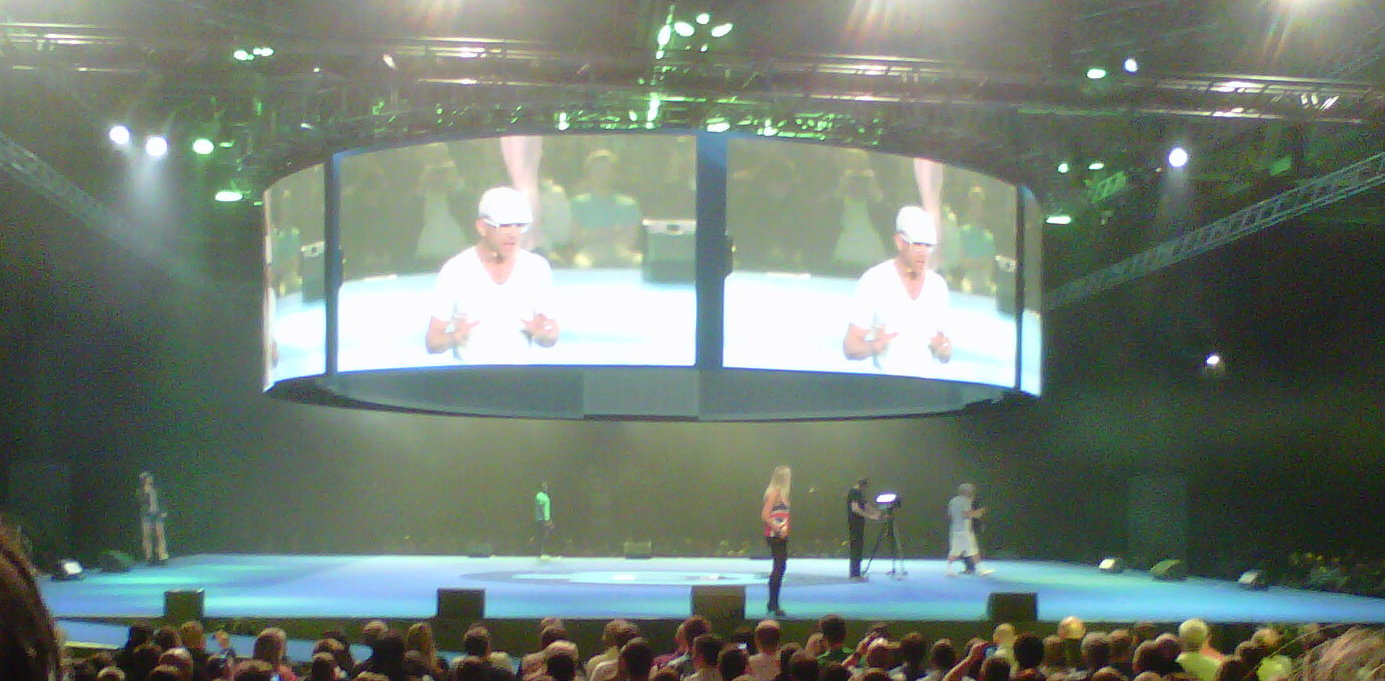
The live Super Theatre at Gadget Show Live 2013, featuring Jason Bradbury and Pollyanna Woodward

The Gadget Show Live was an exhibition that showcased the latest in technology from different sectors. It took place annually at the Birmingham National Exhibition Centre, and allowed visitors the chance to test and buy the latest technology in the market.

The show encompassed a variety of different features which in the past have included Battlefield Live, Robo Challenge Arena, Toy Arena, Game Zone, Future Tech Zone, Photographic Stage and The HUB. The show's most infamous feature is the Super Theatre, an exclusive hour-long interactive theatre show hosted by the presenters.

In 2013, the show took place 2–7 April, in 2014, it took place 9–13 April, in 2015, it took place 7–12 April and in 2016, it took place 31 March–3 April.

In 2017, the show was dropped by organisers Upper Street Events in favour of a new event at Westfield London.

== Books ==
- The Gadget Show: Big Book of Cool Stuff (Black Dog Press, 14 October 2021) ISBN 9781912165353

== See also ==
- Click
- Gadget Geeks
- Tomorrow's World
