= Baytree Centre =

Women's rights charity

Baytree Centre is a non-profit organisation (charity registration number 1175145) for women and girls in Brixton, South London. It opened in 1991.

== History ==
In 1981, Brixton experienced riots widely attributed to entrenched unemployment and racial discrimination. In 1982, a small educational group was established in the Moorfields Estate by local priest Father Hugh Thwaites. In 1987, a survey was conducted with Hilary Schlesinger, CEO of Lambeth Accord, and other women from Opus Dei to determine the community's main needs in order to expand the support. That same year, Alvaro del Portillo, then the prelate of Opus Dei, blessed the premises. The warehouse on Brixton Road was purchased in 1988, and in 1991 the centre officially opened.

In 2002, Princess Anne visited the centre to celebrate Baytree's 10th anniversary. In 2017, Baytree, along with other youth-based organisations in Brixton, founded Building Young Brixton, a partnership initiative of local charities. In 2020 during the COVID-19 pandemic, Baytree delivered food banks, digital services and data to over 500 families in Brixton. In 2021, Baytree joined Ecosystem Coldharbour, a local initiative aimed at preventing youth crime. Ecosystem Coldharbour won the Safer Lambeth Award at the Lambeth Civic Awards 2024.

Baytree comprises the Youth Service, the Women's Service and the Volunteer Service. These offer ESOL classes, mentoring, careers workshops and after school activities.

In 2018, an Opus Dei handbook listed Baytree as one of the organisation's corporate works and Prelate Fernando Ocáriz described it as an Opus Dei initiative. However, in 2001, Baytree’s director—an Opus Dei supernumerary—stated that its staff are of various faiths and that the centre does not seek to recruit new members.
