= Shop Smart, Save Money (2023 TV series) =

British television show

Shop Smart, Save Money is a British television show on Channel 5. With a number of the same presenting team and format on the same channel, it is the spiritual successor to The Gadget Show.
