= Pollyanna Woodward =

British television presenter (born 1982)

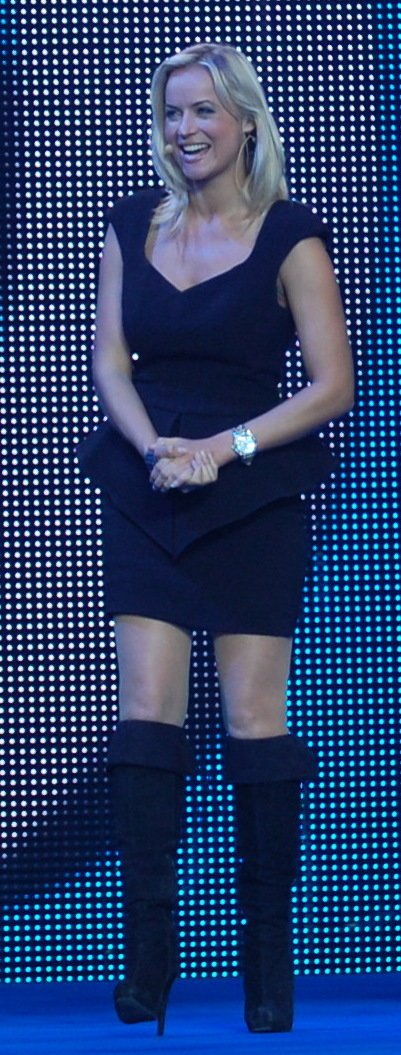
- Pollyanna Woodward in April 2011
- Born: 11 June 1982 (age 44); Mansfield, Nottinghamshire, England
- Occupation: Television presenter
- Years active: 2002–present
- Known for: The Gadget Show; Popstars: The Rivals
- Spouse: Paul Casey (m. 2015)
- Children: 2
- Website: Official website

Pollyanna Woodward (born 11 June 1982) is a British television presenter, best known for being a co-presenter on Channel 5's The Gadget Show.

== Career ==
The youngest of six children, aged 16 she was offered a place at the Carlton Television Junior Workshop in Nottingham. She then studied performing arts to gain an HND, training as a singer, actress and presenter. She was named Miss Mansfield and Sherwood Forest in 2001.

After graduation, she featured in television shows including Ghost Squad and Doctors, and performed as a stunt-double in Eleventh Hour. She also competed in Popstars: The Rivals in 2002, sharing a room with Sarah Harding, getting down to the last 13 female competitors.

Transferring to television presenting, after a period on QVC, from 2008–2011 she was the "Booth Girl" on The Wright Stuff, and motorsport presentation for the British Touring Car Championship and British Superbike Championship. Specialising in technology, she is a columnist for How It Works magazine, and was a technology correspondent on Talksport. She joined Techworld.tv in December 2009, before joining The Gadget Show in November 2010. She left The Gadget Show after the Autumn 2013 series. She also writes on technology for various newspapers and magazines, as well as corporate presentation.

== Personal life ==
Previously married to QVC presenter Lee Clark, Woodward met golfer Paul Casey whilst co-presenting the Formula 1 Chequered Flag Ball with Eddie Jordan at the 2011 Abu Dhabi Grand Prix. The couple became engaged during the Christmas 2013/New Year 2014 period.
