= Jason Bradbury =

British television presenter

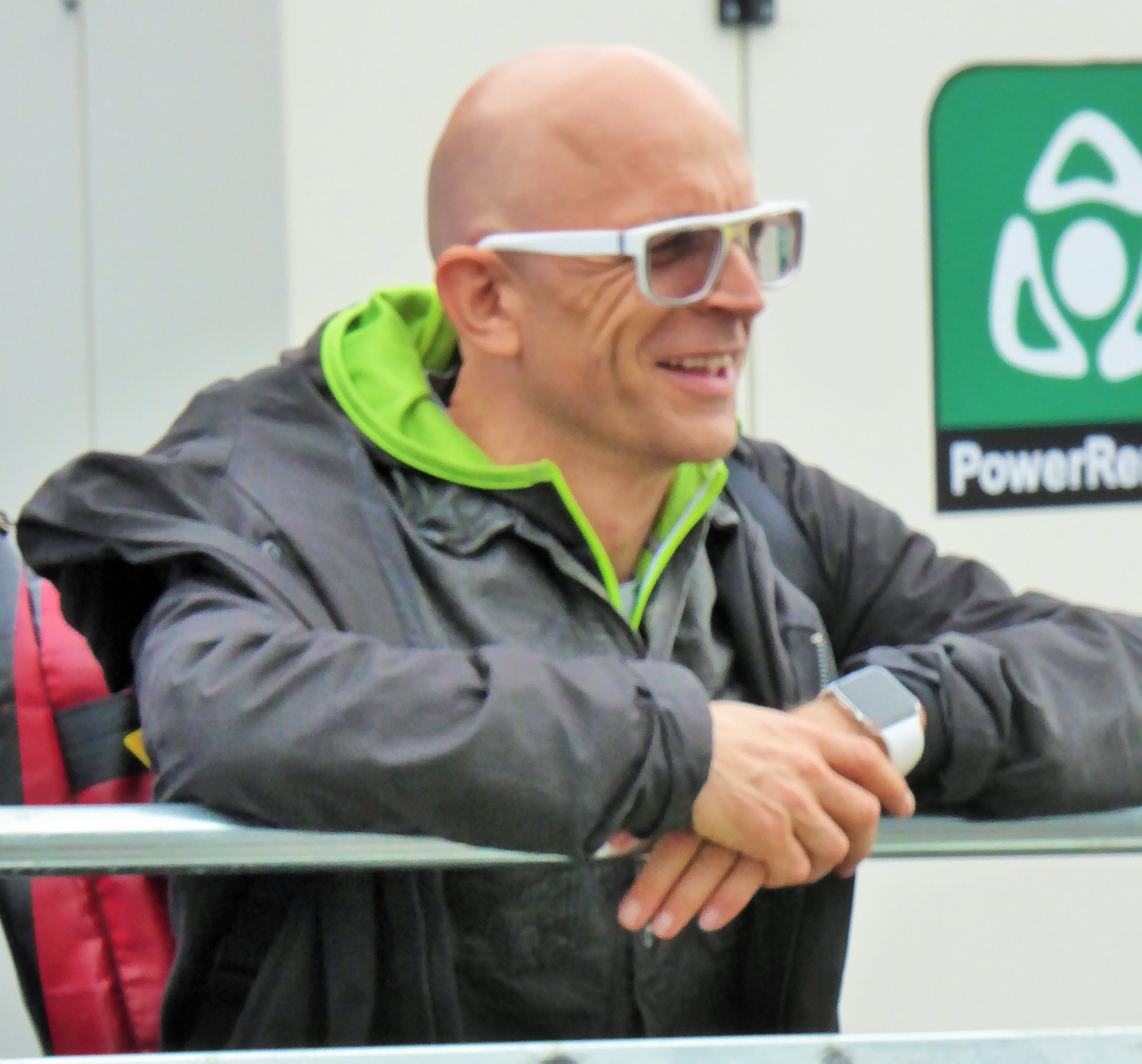
- Jason Bradbury in May 2016
- Born: Jason Alan Bradbury; 10 April 1969 (age 57); Birmingham, England
- Occupations: Television presenter, children's author, Guinness world record holder, Lecturer
- Television: The Gadget Show (2004–2016)
- Spouse: Claire Craddock (m. 2012)
- Children: 3
- Website: Official website

Jason Alan Bradbury (born 10 April 1969) is a British television presenter and children's author, best known for presenting shows such as the Channel 5 technology programme The Gadget Show and the BBC One game show Don't Scare the Hare. In 2016, Bradbury presented several rounds of the Tour Series cycling competition for ITV4.

His first book, Dot Robot, was published on 5 February 2009 and his second novel in the Dot Robot series of techno-thrillers, Atomic Swarm, was published on 1 February 2010. The third book, Cyber Gold was published on 7 April 2011.

He is on the judging panels for the BAFTA Video Games Awards and the Media Guardian Innovation Awards.

== Television ==
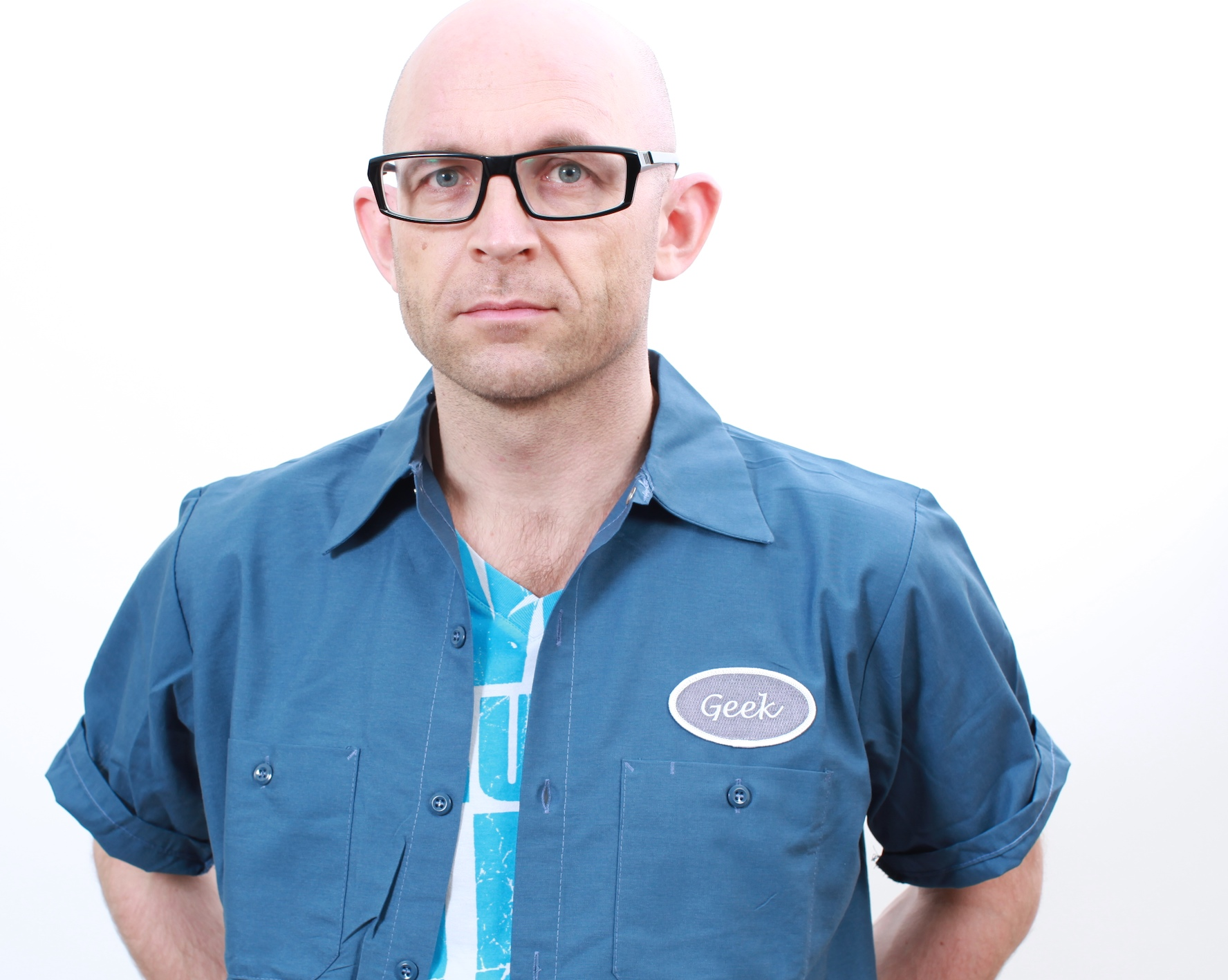
Bradbury in 2009

Bradbury's first ever television show was a cable show called Tellywest, where he worked alongside Sacha Baron Cohen. He has also hosted shows on Bravo including Mercenaries in 2001/2002 (later repeated on the Virgin Channel some years later), and also on Trouble TV including T Spot, Trouble @ Breakfast, Jason on Your Doorstop and Trouble Radio. He was also a presenter for BBC Knowledge's Front Room.

=== The Gadget Show ===
Bradbury was a presenter on The Gadget Show for 12 years, from when it launched in 2004 to 2016. On The Gadget Show, Bradbury visited universities, laboratories and research and development departments to see future science and technology. He undertook DIY gadget builds, which have included a DIY hoverboard, the world's first 'phone glove', a Head-Up Display for his girlfriend's car, and a "mind-reading" device made from a modified mouse that (crudely) controlled a computer. He also built his own hovercraft using only a car wheel and an industrial sized fan.

=== Don't Scare the Hare ===
Jason was the host of the primetime BBC One game show Don't Scare the Hare which made its debut on 23 April 2011. The show was presented by Jason and narrated by Sue Perkins, and was scheduled to run for 9 episodes (including a compilation show), however it was axed after just a few episodes due to poor ratings.

=== Motor Morphers ===
Bradbury hosted the Channel 5 show Motor Morphers which made its debut on 6 May 2013 and ran for 4 episodes. In it, two teams were tasked with converting an old vehicle each into something different, which they then pitted against each other.

== Guinness World Records ==
- The fastest speed reached by an internal combustion powered radio-controlled model car is 137.86 km/h (85.66 mph) on the set of The Gadget Show on 29 October 2008.
- The fastest speed in a water jet–powered car is 26.8 km/h (16.65 mph) and was achieved on the set of The Gadget Show on 15 March 2010.
- The longest ramp jump performed by a remote controlled model car is 26.18 m achieved by an HPI Vorza on the set of The Gadget Show on 25 March 2010. (He has since been beaten by Thomas Strobel from Germany on 30 July 2011 with a distance of 36.9 m.)
- The fastest speed attained on a jet-powered street luge is 186.41 km/h (115.83 mph), achieved on the set of The Gadget Show's 200th episode on 9 August 2011.

== Books ==
Bradbury has written a series of techno-thrillers for 8- to 13-year-olds called Dot Robot. The first in the trilogy, Dot Robot, tells the story of a twelve-year-old mathematics and computer gaming genius, recruited into a top-secret robot defence-force. He has also been touring schools in the UK since publication of the series with an interactive robot experience called The Dot Robot Roadshow. His second book Atomic Swarm, was published by Puffin on 1 February 2010 and the last in the trilogy, Cyber Gold, was published on 7 April 2011.

== Personal life ==
Bradbury was born in Birmingham but grew up in Lincolnshire, attending New York, Lincolnshire Primary School and Gartree Community School. He later moved to London. Bradbury has been married to Claire since 8 April 2012; they have three children. He is also a very active Twitter user with just over 260,000 'followers'. Bradbury also has a private pilot's licence and holds a UK radio amateur licence with callsign 2E0JAB. Jason has lived in Newquay, Cornwall since July 2021.
