= Waiting for God (Red Dwarf) =

- Red Dwarf episode
- Episode no.: Series 1 Episode 4
- Directed by: Ed Bye
- Written by: Rob Grant; Doug Naylor
- Original air date: 7 March 1988

Guest appearances
- Noel Coleman as Cat priest; John Lenahan as Toaster (Voice); Tony Hawks as Dispensing Machine (Voice)

Episode chronology
← Previous "Balance of Power"	Next → "Confidence and Paranoia"
- Red Dwarf I

"Waiting For God" is the fourth episode from science fiction sitcom Red Dwarf series one and was first broadcast on the British television channel BBC2 on 7 March 1988. The episode's theme is religion: atheist Rimmer succumbs to a passionate belief in a superrace of aliens with the technology to give him a new body, while Lister reflects on his role as god of the Cat people.

Written by Rob Grant and Doug Naylor, and directed by Ed Bye, the episode was considered to be one of the weakest from the first series.

The episode was remastered, along with the rest of the first three series, in 1998, to bring the episodes up to a standard suitable for international broadcast.

== Plot ==
Holly (Norman Lovett) tracks an unidentified object near to Red Dwarf and brings it aboard. When Arnold Rimmer (Chris Barrie) sees it, he quickly believes it to be a stasis capsule carrying a dormant member of an alien race that can give him a new body. However, when he leaves it in the observation room and awaits it being cleared of quarantine, Dave Lister (Craig Charles) makes a closer inspection and finds it to be one of the ships' jettisoned garbage pods. When Holly admits to him that he didn't say anything about this to Rimmer as a joke, Lister decides to keep quiet as well. While leaving Rimmer to carry out fruitless examinations of the pod, Lister becomes curious about Cat (Danny John-Jules) and his sudden disappearances for "investigating", and decides to learn more about his people.

Lister learns the Cat race lived their lives according to five sacred religious laws (four of which Lister himself has broken because of his lifestyle; one he would have but could not), and that Cat's race destroyed itself in holy wars over minor details of their heaven "Fuchal" (based on a misunderstanding of Lister's future plans on Fiji). When Cat disappears again, Lister follows him to the ship's cargo hold, whereupon he discovers Cat has been attending to one other survivor – an elderly and blind cat priest. Learning that he is dying, Lister overhears him questioning his faith to his race's god "Cloister", and asks Cat to burn his priest's hat. Lister opts to prevent this and convinces the priest he lived an admirable life and will soon reach "Fuchal", causing the priest to be joyous on his final day before he dies. Returning to the upper decks, Lister joins Rimmer to examine the pod's contents after its quarantine period is over. When Rimmer begins to see garbage and doubts what he originally thought, he finally deduces angrily what he was investigating over the episode's closing credits.

== Production ==
Written by co-creators, Rob Grant and Doug Naylor, and directed by series regular Ed Bye, the episode features the first real appearance of the skutters, small service droids which consisted of a robot arm on a movable base. They were considered unreliable props because they would frequently go out of control. It was thought that nearby taxi radio signals were interfering with the remote control signals.

Noel Coleman starred as the Cat Priest and John Lenahan returned to voice the Toaster.

== Reception ==
The episode was originally broadcast on the British television channel BBC2 on 7 March 1988. Although the pilot episode "The End" drew in over five million viewers, viewing figures declined as the series progressed.

The first series of Red Dwarf had not been initially repeated, and Grant and Naylor were reluctant to allow it to be released on home video. This episode was eventually released in August 1993 on a video also containing "Confidence and Paranoia and "Me²".

The episode was one of the least popular in Red Dwarf Smegazine readers poll in 1992 — it came in 27th of 30 episodes, with 0.4% of the votes.

== Remastering ==
The remastering of Series I to III was carried out during the late 1990s. Changes throughout the series included replacement of the opening credits, giving the picture a colour grade and filmising, computer generated special effects of Red Dwarf and many more visual and audio enhancements.

Changes specific to "Waiting For God" include new music to accompany the Cat's early scenes, echo added to the pod quarantine scenes, continuity error of Rimmer's folded arms corrected, Cat religion artwork added to Holly's explanation of the Cat race, some lines removed and certain scenes tightened up, shots of Lister with donut and golden sausage removed and new ashes canister leaving Red Dwarf inserted.

== See also ==
- Infinity Welcomes Careful Drivers – The first Red Dwarf novel which expands on The Cat people's history and origins as well featuring material not seen in any of the episodes.
