= Red Dwarf I =

Series of television

- Starring: Chris Barrie; Craig Charles; Danny John-Jules; Norman Lovett
- No. of episodes: 6

Release
- Original network: BBC2
- Original release: 15 February – 21 March 1988

Series chronology
- Next → Red Dwarf II

Red Dwarf I is the first series of the British science fiction sitcom Red Dwarf. It consisted of six episodes and was broadcast on UK television channel BBC2 between 15 February and 21 March 1988.

In the series slobbish technician Dave Lister (Craig Charles) becomes the only survivor of an accident on Red Dwarf, and the last survivor of the human race, three million years in the future; he is joined by a holographic reproduction of his dead bunkmate and boss, Arnold Rimmer (Chris Barrie), a sapient Cat (Danny John-Jules) who is a result of three million years' evolution, and the ship's computer Holly (Norman Lovett).

== Writing and production ==
The pilot script, "The End", was written in 1983; the writing duo team of Rob Grant and Doug Naylor handed the finished script to producer Paul Jackson who had trouble convincing the BBC to take on the series. Three years after the initial rejections, the script was accepted by BBC North West.

An electricians strike at the BBC in 1987 prevented the series from being filmed, but the production continued with rehearsals of the scripts written. The shoot was remounted later in 1987. After the original attempt at production it had been decided that the second episode "Bodysnatcher", which had been written early as an example of what a typical episode might be like, was not working. "Me²" was written as an replacement, picking up from an altered cliffhanger at the end of "Confidence and Paranoia". Much of the first episode was reshot in a seventh week set aside for pickups at the end of the recording, including a version of the opening scene with additional jokes.

== Casting ==
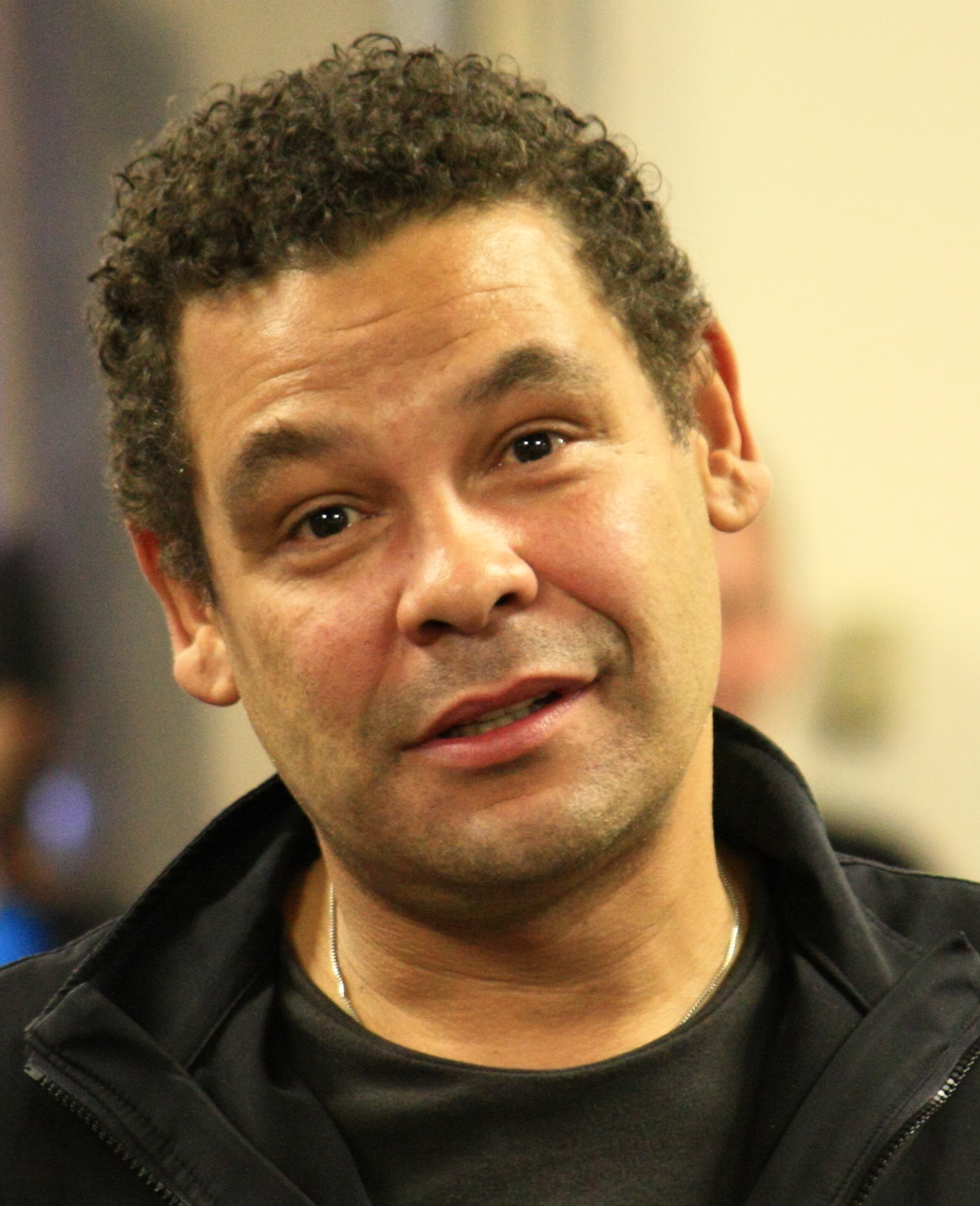
Craig Charles, 2009

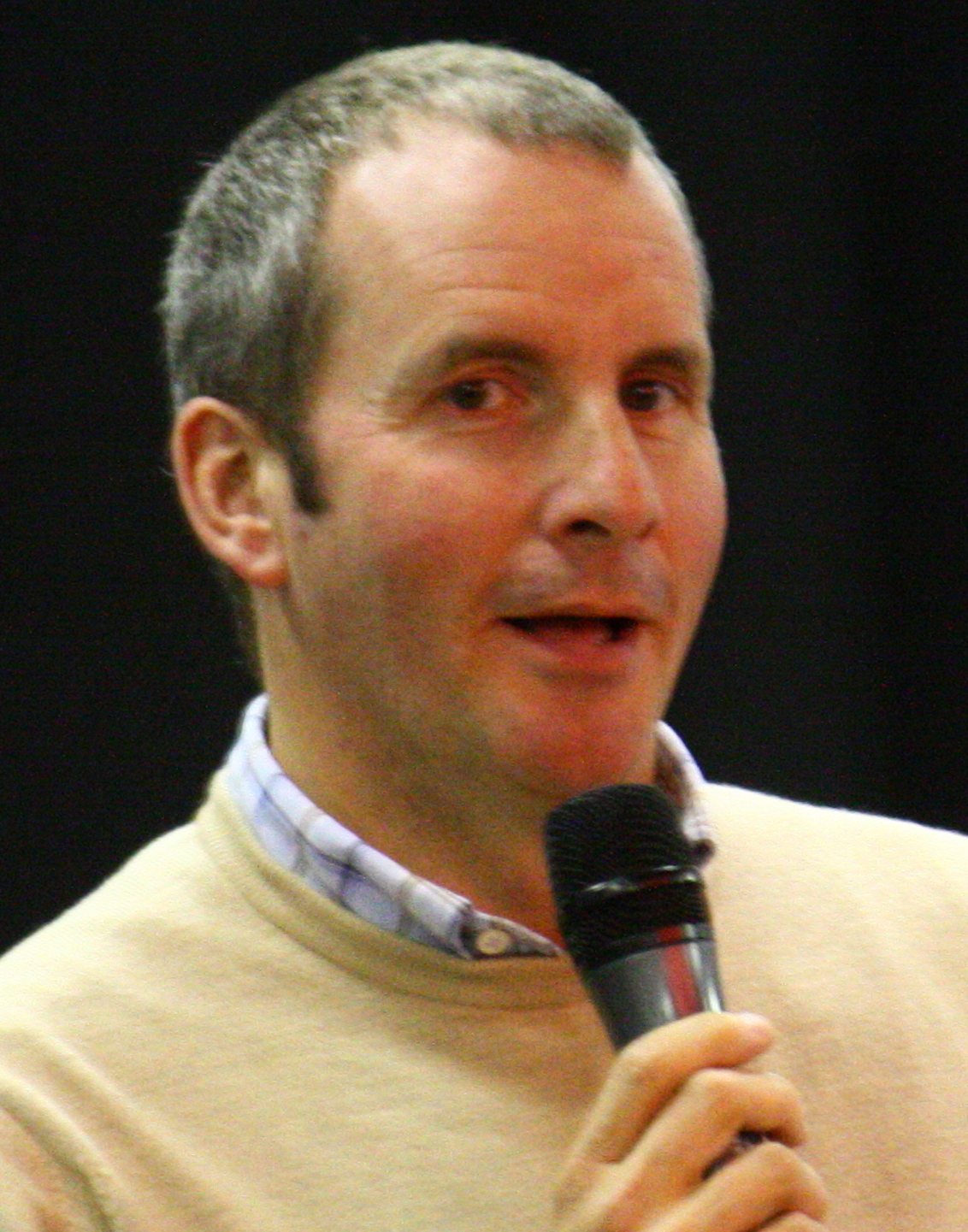
Chris Barrie, 2009

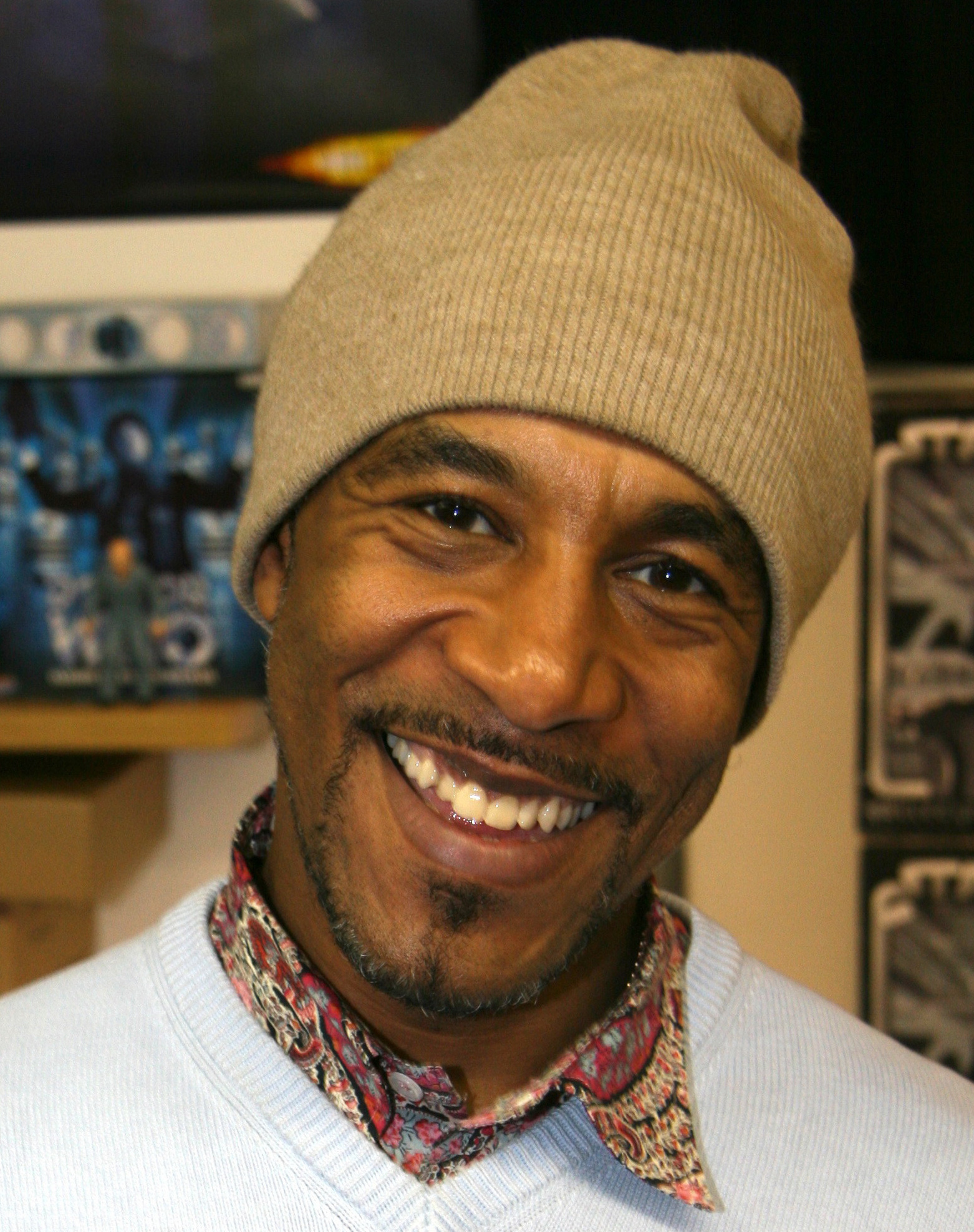
Danny John-Jules, 2008

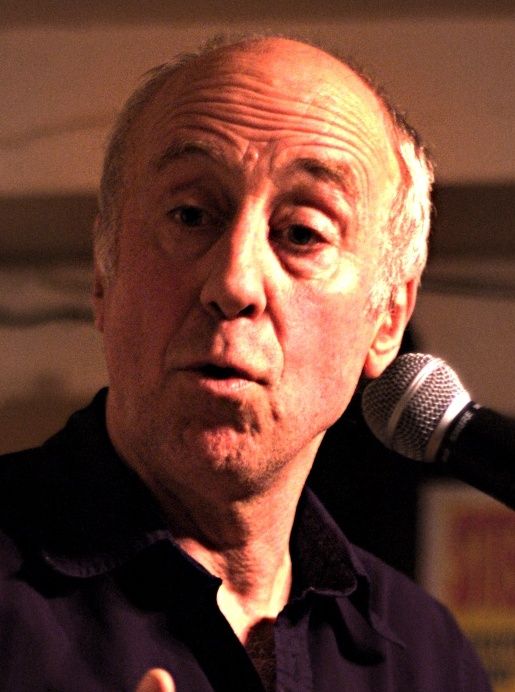
Norman Lovett, 2005

Charles, Barrie, John-Jules and Lovett were cast as the four leading roles: Dave Lister, his bunkmate Arnold Rimmer, the Cat and the ship's computer Holly, respectively.

Various auditions were held for the core roles of Arnold Rimmer and Dave Lister, with Grant and Naylor hoping to cast more traditional actors. Alan Rickman was interested but ultimately did not want to work before a live studio audience. Chris Barrie and Alfred Molina were in the running for Rimmer, and it was decided that the Molina, the more experienced actor, would get the part. Producer Paul Jackson passed the script to "punk poet" Craig Charles for a sensitivity read on the character of the Cat. Charles approved of the script and decided he wanted to be cast as Lister, despite having zero acting experience, and the role being written as a man somewhat older than Charles. His reading impressed Grant and Naylor and he was cast, and then due to concerns over chemistry, Molina was replaced by Barrie as Rimmer. Barrie was known as an impressionist and had previously worked with Grant and Naylor on Spitting Image.

Two other regulars rounded out the cast: Stand-up Norman Lovett was cast as ship's computer Holly, having earlier auditioned for Rimmer: this was intended originally as a voiceover role but Lovett was able to persuade the crew to show his face on a computer screen. For the Cat, Danny John-Jules was the first to be seen at audition, arriving an hour late with an obliviousness that channelled the character.

The first episode features a large cast of ship crew members, before an accident that leaves only Lister alive. Grant and Naylor imagined casting very well known comedy actors in these roles but this did not happen, and guest characters included Captain Hollister, played by American comedian Mac McDonald; officer Todhunter, played by Robert Bathurst; and Lister's love interest Kristine Kochanski, played by Scottish actor and singer C. P. Grogan. Originally Alexandra Pigg had been booked to play Kochanski but she was unavailable on the rearranged studio dates. A group of Lister's friends — Petersen, Chen and Selby — appear in the first episode, played by Mark Williams, Paul Bradley, and David Gillespe respectively. All these characters except for Todhunter would make small appearances in later episodes in the series.

Additional guest cast members in the series were rare. Noel Coleman played an elderly Cat priest in the episode "Waiting for Godot", and in the episode "Confidence and Paranoia" the parts of Confidence and Paranoia - solid apparitions caused by Lister having contracting a mutated virus, were played by Lee Cornes and Craig Ferguson respectively.

== Broadcast and reception ==
The series was broadcast by BBC2 in February and March 1988. The episode "Future Echoes", which was shot fourth, was placed second in the running order as it was felt to be a strong one.

Writing in The Stage after the broadcast of "The End", Ann Mann praised the writing and execution as "very funny" and identified the relationship between Rimmer and Lister as "working admirably". Peter Tory singled out Danny John-Jules' performance as Cat across the six episodes for praise in the Daily Express.

Jeremy Conrad, reviewing the United States DVD release in 2003 for IGN, said that although the series might be an "acquired taste", he thought "the guys hit the ground running right from 'The End'."

Writing in 2015, Den of Geek ranked Red Dwarf I the sixth (Note: Misprinted in article; there are two number 5s) of the then nine full seasons of the show, saying that the "early episodes of Dwarf have a charming simplicity that was lost as the show's budgets and scope grew", and noting the sci-fi elements in "Future Echoes", "Confidence and Paranoia" and "Me²"

In 2017 Sophie Davies of CultBox noted the different tone of the series to later ones, saying "Red Dwarf I takes place entirely within the confines of the ship. When at one point a mysterious pod arrives, Rimmer fantasises about the aliens that could be living inside, only to find that it’s full of nothing but garbage."

== Episodes ==
No. overall	No. in series	Title	Directed by	Written by	Original release date	Prod. code	Viewers (millions)
1	1	"The End"	Ed Bye	Rob Grant and Doug Naylor	15 February 1988	1	4.75
In the 23rd century, slobbish technician Dave Lister, a crew member of the Jupiter Mining Corporation vessel Red Dwarf, is placed into suspended animation for eighteen months as punishment for smuggling aboard an unquarantined pregnant cat. However, the ship's computer Holly is forced to keep him in stasis until three million years later after a radiation disaster wipes out the crew. Although initially alone, he soon discovers that he has company in the form of his austere and petty bunkmate Arnold Rimmer, kept alive as a hologram, and a humanoid called Cat, an evolved descendant of Lister's cat which had safely avoided the disaster in the ship's hold.
2	2	"Future Echoes"	Ed Bye	Rob Grant and Doug Naylor	22 February 1988	4	3.4
The new crew of Lister, Rimmer and Cat learn that Red Dwarf has been steadily accelerating for three million years. When it breaches light speed, they soon begin to experience "future echoes"—visions of the future that have yet to happen. Lister is soon shocked when he discovers he will die in the future while making repairs to the ship, until further echoes reveal a much more shocking truth about his future.
3	3	"Balance of Power"	Ed Bye	Rob Grant and Doug Naylor	29 February 1988	2	4.25
Lister wants to go on a date with the hologram of his former love interest, navigation officer Kristine Kochanski. However, this would mean replacing Rimmer as the ship's hologram, which of course he will not let happen due to being a higher rank than his bunkmate. Lister decides to take a cooking exam so he can become a chef, as this will allow him to hold sufficient rank to overrule Rimmer's objections, forcing his friend to try to do anything to discourage him.
4	4	"Waiting for God"	Ed Bye	Rob Grant and Doug Naylor	7 March 1988	3	3.75
Red Dwarf stumbles upon one of its own garbage pods, and Rimmer is convinced that it's a stasis capsule carrying a dormant alien woman. While he is distracted, Lister learns more about Cat's species—Felis sapiens—and discovers how his actions involving the cat he smuggled has made him a mythical legend amongst Cat's people, including the last surviving member in the bowels of the ship.
5	5	"Confidence and Paranoia"	Ed Bye	Rob Grant and Doug Naylor	14 March 1988	5	3.8
Lister contracts a form of mutated pneumonia virus, which causes the hallucinations of his fevered brain to materialise in solid form. Soon the ship is beset by bizarre events including herring rain and an exploding 16th-century mayor of Warsaw, before culminating in the personifications of his confidence and paranoia. Rimmer soon suspects this could cause trouble.
6	6	"Me^{2}"	Ed Bye	Rob Grant and Doug Naylor	21 March 1988	6	3.8
Rimmer creates his perfect companion, an identical holographic duplicate of himself, and moves out of his quarters to share a room with them. Although Lister is happy about this, he soon finds that the Rimmers despise each other and can't agree to coexist. Faced with the prospect of deleting one of them, Lister decides to review his bunkmate's past, and discovers an embarrassing secret in the process.

== Home video release ==
The first series of Red Dwarf had not been initially repeated, and Grant and Naylor were reluctant to allow it to be released on home video. It was eventually released in July and August 1993, as two videos consisting of three episodes each.

A remastered edition, with revised visual effects and other changes, was released in 1998. The non-remastered version was released in DVD in 2002.
