= Future Echoes =

- Red Dwarf episode
- Episode no.: Series 1 Episode 2
- Directed by: Ed Bye
- Written by: Rob Grant; Doug Naylor
- Original air date: 22 February 1988

Guest appearances
- John Lenahan as Toaster; Tony Hawks as Dispensing Machine

Episode chronology
← Previous "The End"	Next → "Balance of Power"
- Red Dwarf I

"Future Echoes" is the second episode of the science fiction sitcom Red Dwarf series one and was first broadcast on the British television channel BBC2 on 22 February 1988. It was written by co-creators Rob Grant and Doug Naylor, and directed by Ed Bye.

The episode—which has the crew witnessing brief events from the future as Red Dwarf breaks the light barrier—was considered to be one of the better efforts from the first series, so much so that it has been credited, by the creators, as having saved the series.

The episode was remastered, along with the rest of the first three series, in 1998, to appeal more to international broadcasters.

== Plot ==
Dave Lister (Craig Charles) decides to wait out the journey to Earth in stasis with Cat (Danny John-Jules), much to the annoyance of Arnold Rimmer (Chris Barrie). As Lister prepares for it, the ship is jolted severely, to which the ship's computer Holly (Norman Lovett) explains that the ship's constant acceleration has caused it to break the light barrier. Shortly after being assured the ship will be alright, Lister notices odd things, including his reflection acting on its own, a second Rimmer having a conversation in the Drive Room that makes no sense, and a second Cat running out of his quarters after breaking a tooth. Conveying his observations to Rimmer and Holly, the computer reveals that breaking the light barrier has caused them to experience temporal anomalies known as "future echoes"; events that will occur in the future that can be seen in the present. The pair soon believe this when they find a photograph showing Lister holding two babies in his arms and question how it will happen.

When an explosion rocks through the corridors, Rimmer explains to Lister that he just saw a "future echo" of him dying in the drive room when working on the navicomp. Lister suspects that this will happen when Cat breaks a tooth on one of the robotic goldfish in his quarters and attempts to prevent this. However, Lister inadvertently knocks the tooth out while trying to change the future, whereupon he opts to face his destiny and fix the drive room's navicomp when it starts malfunctioning. When he manages to repair it without incident, Rimmer questions what he had actually seen. Returning to their quarters, they soon encounter another "future echo" consisting of an elderly Lister who explains that Rimmer had actually seen the death of one of his twin sons. Before he disappears, he tells the pair to head to the medical unit with a camera.

As they do so, Lister questions Holly about the range of "future echoes", to which the computer replies that the faster they go beyond the light barrier, the further into the future they can see. However, as the ship is now slowing down, the "future echoes" will begin to be closer to the present until the ship resumes normal speed. Before the pair reach the medical unit, Rimmer questions how Lister would get twin sons with no women on board, to which Lister insists he doesn't know but believes it will be a laugh to find out. The pair soon see a future Lister of similar age walk out of the unit with two crying babies, and poses for the camera.

== Production ==
Split-screen techniques were used to achieve the Rimmer echo

It was the fourth episode recorded and they felt it worked well, but it proved very difficult to write and the script confused a lot of people. Director Ed Bye was even said to have been skeptical and baffled by it. The writers were convinced viewers would be swayed by the unusual premise of the show, and an introduction was written to be read by Holly at the beginning of each episode to remind audiences of the premise of the show and what events had preceded that particular episode. Co-creator and writer, Doug Naylor, frequently had to remind the cast of these things too, as it took them a while to get their heads around the plot. Despite this, it was eventually decided by the producers that it actually introduced the fact this was a sit-com which used real scientific principles better than previously recorded episodes and aired it as the second episode.

Split-screen techniques were used as Lister talked to Rimmer's echo—just as the original Rimmer walked out the door. While Craig Charles interacted with Chris Barrie the first time, he had to then act with thin air. Where in fact, the finished shot would have Rimmer's echo walking in from the other direction and Lister trying to talk to him. This was achieved by shooting the scene with Charles and Barrie and then a separate shot of Barrie was added to the scene to follow on with the conversation with Charles.

The skutters, the tiny, motorised, three-clawed service droids, were actual working models. They were made up of parts including old shoe boxes and the engines of radio-controlled cars. Interference originating from the radios of a nearby taxi company, which was particularly busy during filming of "Future Echoes", caused havoc with the skutter models on set. One reportedly poked Craig Charles in the eye, and another launched an unsuspecting attack on Chris Barrie's groin. Coincidentally the skutters were in the script very inept towards their maintenance work and mischievous towards humans.

John Lenahan voiced the Toaster and Tony Hawks provided his voice for the Dispensing Machine.

After the episode aired Rob Grant and Doug Naylor became uncomfortable with how casually Lister takes the news of his future son's violent death. When this episode was adapted for Infinity Welcomes Careful Drivers, this was altered so it's actually Lister's grandson who dies in the navicomp explosion.

== Cultural references ==
This was the first episode of the series to deal with a science fiction plot based on real scientific theory, which was to become a common occurrence in later Red Dwarf episodes. For this particular episode, time dilation and various assorted time anomalies caused by travelling close to the speed of light (or indeed even at the speed of light) are referenced in Albert Einstein's theory of relativity.

== Reception ==
"Future Echoes" was originally broadcast on the British television channel BBC2 on 21 February 1988. Although the pilot episode "The End" gained over five million viewers, this was now tailing off slightly as the series progressed.

The first series of Red Dwarf had not been initially repeated, and Grant and Naylor were reluctant to allow it to be released on home video. This episode was eventually released in July 1993 on a video also containing "The End" and "Balance of Power".

The episode was one ranked the second most popular (after "The End") of the six first series episodes to be ranked in the Red Dwarf Smegazine readers poll in 1992 — although came placed at number 24 of 30 overall.

Co-creator and writer, Rob Grant, stated that if it wasn't for "Future Echoes" then the show would have been nonexistent. It was the fourth episode recorded and they felt it worked so well they brought it forward in the schedule to second.

== Remastering ==
Video effects were added to the existing footage to give the illusion of breaking light speed

The remastering of series one to three was carried out during the late 1990s. Changes carried out included replacement of the opening credits (re-instating the original idea of the one shot of pulling away from the ship), colour grading and filmising of the picture, new computer-generated special effects of Red Dwarf flying through space, and many more visual, audio and scene adjustments.

Changes specific to "Future Echoes" include new bike shots of Lister inserted at the beginning, and computer-generated special effects of Red Dwarf breaking the light barrier. Also post-production video effects of white flashes were added to scenes when the ship breaks the light barrier. An additional dramatic score was added to the scene of Lister's impending death.

== See also ==
- Red Dwarf: Infinity Welcomes Careful Drivers – the first Red Dwarf novel which features an expanded version of events from this episode, as well as new material not seen in the television episodes.
- Time travel in fiction
