= Me2 (Red Dwarf) =

"Me^{2}"
- Red Dwarf episode
- Episode no.: Series 1 Episode 6
- Directed by: Ed Bye
- Written by: Rob Grant; Doug Naylor
- Original air date: 21 March 1988

Guest appearances
- Mac McDonald as Captain Hollister; Tony Hawks as Indian Restaurant Advert (Voice)

Episode chronology
← Previous "Confidence and Paranoia"	Next → "Kryten"
- Red Dwarf I

"Me^{2}" (pronounced "me, squared") is the sixth and final episode from series one of the science fiction sitcom Red Dwarf, which was first broadcast on BBC2 on 21 March 1988. Written by Rob Grant and Doug Naylor, and directed by Ed Bye. The script was written as a late addition to the series following an electricians' strike at the BBC. The episode follows on from the cliffhanger set by "Confidence and Paranoia"—there are now two Rimmers on board Red Dwarf.

The episode was remastered, along with the rest of the first three series, in 1998, to bring it up to a standard suitable for international broadcast.

== Plot ==
Arnold Rimmer (Chris Barrie) is delighted to have a double of himself after Dave Lister (Craig Charles) activated his hologram disc, believing it would allow him to see his love interest, Kristine Kochanski. The pair promptly move out and begin spending time with each other, the Rimmers both moving into new sleeping quarters and encouraging each other through their routines of study, exercise, sleep. Lister decides to make the most of it by enjoying his own sleeping quarters to himself and viewing a video left by Rimmer, detailing his death. Choosing to skip his lengthy monologue, he views the moment when Rimmer was being chastised by Captain Hollister (Mac McDonald) for his repair of the drive plate before the crew's death in the radiation surge. Lister soon becomes confused over Rimmer's dying words, "Gazpacho soup!", and decides to find out why he said them.

The Rimmers soon find themselves competing against each other, causing their tempers to fray and an argument to break out between the two. Lister learns that each has determined that the other must go. Deciding which one should go, Lister randomly chooses the original Rimmer. As Rimmer arrives in full uniform, including his medals for his long years of service on Red Dwarf, to prepare for erasure, Lister asks him about his final words before his death. Rimmer, after becoming (simulatedly) drunk, soon explains he was once invited to the Captain's Table for dinner, and was served Gazpacho soup for starters. Because he did not realise that it was meant to be served cold, Rimmer was humiliated by everyone when he ordered the chef take it away and bring it back hot, and thus was never invited to the Table again. Rimmer remarks that it was the worst moment in his life and prepares for his erasure, only for Lister to explain that he opted to erase the double just to hear his explanation. Rimmer, annoyed at being tricked, demands him to tell no one, to which Lister agrees before teasing him.

== Production ==
When Red Dwarf first went into the studios at BBC Manchester, "Me^{2}" had not yet been written. An electrician strike meant that the originally planned shooting dates were used instead for rehearsals; it was decided that episode two of the run, "Bodysnatcher" was the weakest of the six. For the remount, it was scrapped, and replaced by "Me^{2}", following up the cliffhanger established at the end of the originally planned series finale, "Confidence and Paranoia". The plot of "Me^{2}" is partly based on "Bodysnatcher", which featured Lister not getting along with his own hologram - Grant and Naylor took this basic concept and centred it around Rimmer instead. The script for the episode was collected in the 1995 book Son of Soup.

The two Rimmer scenes were shot using a split screen process, meaning that Chris Barrie would do a take on one half of the screen and then go over to the other half and do another take. The takes would be spliced together in the editing process. Rimmer's embarrassing and reputation-damaging incident with gazpacho soup is based on a real incident that was only narrowly avoided by writers Rob Grant and Doug Naylor. At a meeting at Thames Television, the pair were bewildered when they received cold soup, but refrained from saying anything. Afterwards, they discovered that gazpacho soup is meant to be served cold, and they had avoided the embarrassment that the fictional Rimmer would later suffer.

Although Mac McDonald returned to play Captain Hollister, his scene was filmed at the same time as his appearances in the first episode; "The End".

Additionally, the line "What a guy!" used by Rimmer 1 when spoken to Rimmer 2 was re-used in later series by other characters in reaction to the actions of Rimmer's parallel-universe alter-ego Ace Rimmer.

== Cultural references ==
Orson Welles' film Citizen Kane is referenced both directly and indirectly during this episode. Lister tells Rimmer that he and Cat are going to be watching Citizen Kane at the ship's cinema. The more subtle references appear in Rimmer's death scene, where a snow globe drops off the Captain's desk next to his hand, thus mirroring Kane's death in the film, and utters his cryptic last words "gazpacho soup" which hold importance in the episode. Kane's last word, "Rosebud", was the theme of the film.

== Reception ==
The episode was originally broadcast on the British television channel BBC2 on 21 March 1988 in the 9:00 p.m. time slot. Both co-creators/writers, Grant and Naylor, consider "Me^{2}" as one of the successes of the first series. Grant stating that it is one of his favourite shows and the idea of how you would react if you met yourself was an intriguing story.

The first series of Red Dwarf had not been initially repeated, and Grant and Naylor were reluctant to allow it to be released on home video. This episode was eventually released in August 1993 on a video also containing "Waiting for God and "Confidence and Paranoia".

The episode was considered one of the better first series episodes in the Red Dwarf Smegazine readers poll in 1992 — it came in 25th of 30 episodes (third within the first series), with 0.9% of the votes.

== Remastering ==
The remastering of Series I to III was carried out during the late 1990s. Changes throughout the series included replacement of the opening credits, giving the picture a colour grade and filmising, computer-generated special effects of the Red Dwarf spaceship and many more visual and audio enhancements.

Changes specific to "Me^{2}" include new music and sound effects over Rimmer's tribute video, fireball corridor shot added to flashback of cadmium explosion, new explosion and sound effects added to scene, shots of Lister smoking tightened or removed to keep in line with current TV standards and Rimmer 2 calling Rimmer 1 a "great nancy" was removed.

== See also ==
- Infinity Welcomes Careful Drivers – The first Red Dwarf novel which expands on the episode's premise.
