= Confidence and Paranoia =

- Red Dwarf episode
- Episode no.: Series 1 Episode 5
- Directed by: Ed Bye
- Written by: Rob Grant; Doug Naylor
- Original air date: 14 March 1988

Guest appearances
- Lee Cornes as Paranoia; Craig Ferguson as Confidence

Episode chronology
← Previous "Waiting for God"	Next → "Me²"
- Red Dwarf I

"Confidence and Paranoia" is the fifth episode from series one of the science fiction sitcom Red Dwarf. It was first broadcast on the British television channel BBC2 on 14 March 1988. The plot involves Lister's mutated pneumonia which manifests solid hallucinations.

Written by Rob Grant and Doug Naylor, and directed by Ed Bye, the episode was originally going to be broadcast as the series cliffhanger but was moved down in the broadcast schedule with a new series finale taking its place.

The episode was remastered, along with the rest of the first three series, in 1998, for international broadcast and home video release.

== Plot ==
While snooping through Kristine Kochanski's quarters for her hologram disc, despite the fact they were not decontaminated, Dave Lister (Craig Charles) contracts a mutated strain of pneumonia. The condition causes Lister to become delirious and experience hallucinations, all of which become physical in presence, including fish raining in his sleeping quarters (which Cat (Danny John-Jules) later eats), and the Mayor of Warsaw from 1546 appearing and then spontaneously combusting. Arnold Rimmer (Chris Barrie) later reveals this to Lister, before stating that he also caused two men to appear in the Drive Room. Lister discovers that the men each symbolise a part of his personality: Confidence (Craig Ferguson), who appears as a tall, tanned, flashily-dressed game show host-type man; and Paranoia (Lee Cornes), who appears as a stooped, pallid, black suit-clad little man.

Despite Rimmer's warning that they are symptoms of his condition and thus dangerous, Lister spends time with Confidence and quickly figures out through him that Rimmer hid Kochanski's hologram disc in the solar panels outside their sleeping quarters and that a second hologram could be projected if all unnecessary power is switched off. Rimmer soon learns that someone smashed the Medical Unit's computer to prevent Lister receiving treatment, and warns Lister that he is in mortal danger. Rimmer assumes that Paranoia is the culprit, since he has disappeared. While on a spacewalk to recover the hologram disc, Lister questions Paranoia's actions, only to learn that Confidence was the culprit and had murdered the other to spend more time with him. Confidence soon pressures Lister into suicidal acts, and dies from the vacuum of space when he removes his helmet. After recovering, Lister prepares to use the disc after retrieving it, but discovers when he uses it that Rimmer planned for this by having it contain a second hologram of himself.

== Production ==
Split-screen technique - shots were done separately and cut together

The production team were very worried that they might get complaints about cruelty to fish regarding the raining fish hallucination scene. In fact no fish were actually harmed and none were dropped from any height, but placed on the floor. The episode used split-screen techniques to show The Mayor of Warsaw approaching Rimmer and spontaneously combusting. The technique was used to minimise any potential threat to the actors. The mayor, Rimmer's reaction and the explosion were all carried out as separate shots and cut together.

This episode was originally going to be the last of the series, and would have concluded with Kochanski being successfully resurrected as a "sort-of cliffhanger". The BBC electrician strike had disrupted the series production, but this gave Grant and Naylor time to re-think about an earlier script titled "Bodysnatcher", which was intended to be the second episode: the pair felt that "Bodysnatcher" was the weakest script of the six, and also suffered because they had not actually written an ending for it. Rob and Doug took the idea from "Bodysnatcher" of two Listers (i.e. him and his hologram) not getting along, and adapted it into the idea of having two Rimmers together. So the ending of "Confidence and Paranoia" was changed to have a duplicate of Rimmer resurrected instead, and this cliffhanger continued into the series finale "Me²".

== Reception ==
The episode was originally broadcast on the British television channel BBC2 on 14 March 1988 in the 9:00pm evening time slot. Although the pilot episode "The End" drew in over five million viewers, this figure was now tailing off as the series progressed.

The first series of Red Dwarf had not been initially repeated, and Grant and Naylor were reluctant to allow it to be released on home video. This episode was eventually released in August 1993 on a video also containing "Waiting for God and "Me²".

The episode was one of the least popular in Red Dwarf Smegazine readers poll in 1992 — it came in 28th of 30 episodes, with 0.2% of the votes.

== Re-mastered ==
The remastering of Series I to III was carried out during the late 1990s. Changes throughout the series included replacement of the opening credits, giving the picture a colour grade and filmising, computer generated special effects of Red Dwarf and many more visual and audio enhancements. Changes specific to "Confidence and Paranoia" include a new recorded Holly joke to replace the opening 'post office worker' gag, dramatic music cue added to Lister's collapse due to the mutated illness and a CGI scene of Red Dwarf travelling through the dust storm.
