= Balance of Power (Red Dwarf) =

- Red Dwarf episode
- Episode no.: Series 1 Episode 3
- Directed by: Ed Bye
- Written by: Rob Grant; Doug Naylor
- Original air date: 29 February 1988

Guest appearances
- C P Grogan as Kristine Kochanski; Paul Bradley as Chen; David Gillespie as Selby; Mark Williams as Olaf Petersen; Rupert Bates as Trout A La Creme (Voice), Chef

Episode chronology
← Previous "Future Echoes"	Next → "Waiting for God"
- Red Dwarf I

"Balance of Power" is the third episode of science fiction comedy Red Dwarf series one and was first broadcast on the British television channel BBC2 on 29 February 1988. The episode was written by Rob Grant and Doug Naylor, and directed by Ed Bye. The story revolves around Lister's desire to bring his one true love, Kristine Kochanski, back as a hologram.

The episode was re-mastered, along with the rest of the first three series, in 1998, for international broadcast and home media release.

== Plot ==
Arnold Rimmer (Chris Barrie) seeks to keep the ship "spick and span" and arranges for Dave Lister (Craig Charles) to be obedient by rationing his cigarettes and threatening to jettison the ship's entire supply if he disobeys. When Cat (Danny John-Jules) finds them, Rimmer offers him a deal to return them in exchange for getting all the fish he wants from the food dispensers. However, Lister refuses to let this get to him, instead wondering why he could not be with a hologram of his true love Kristine Kochanski (Clare Grogan). When he questions Holly (Norman Lovett) over his decision to revive Rimmer and not anyone else, particularly Kochanski or one of his drinking buddies, the computer explains that Rimmer was considered by him to be the best to keep Lister sane, citing that Rimmer was the person whom Lister interacted with the most. Wishing to spend his Friday night relaxing rather than reviewing the ship's food inventory as Rimmer intended, Lister spends his evening in the ship's empty discotheque, reminiscing about his drinking buddies and Kochanski.

Regardless of Holly's answer, Lister demands Rimmer to let him have Kochanski as a hologram to go on a date with for a few hours. Rimmer refuses his request, believing that he would not be switched back on. This leads to an argument between the pair, which prompts Lister to declare his intention to outrank him by passing his exams. Rimmer assumes he plans to pass the engineering exam and mocks his lack of engineering knowledge. He soon discovers that Lister seeks to pass the chef's exam, which is much easier and will still allow him to outrank Rimmer. Rimmer gets increasingly nervous when Lister appears to be doing well with his studies. Despite Lister's offers to abandon the exam if he were allowed to have Kochanski, Rimmer still refuses. Rimmer realises Lister may pass, so to prevent this, Rimmer corrupts his image to appear and sound like Kochanski and convince him that she wouldn't be interested in someone like Lister, but fails when he acts out of character. Once the exam results come in, Rimmer nervously asks how he did, to which Lister smugly implies that he passed, refusing to show off his results.

== Production ==
The story was written as pure sitcom at the request from the BBC who didn't want the show to be too heavy on science fiction elements.

Lister's disco music, "Fakin'", was by Motor City Diva and Danny John-Jules.

Returning Red Dwarf crew members, and Lister's drinking buddies, included Paul Bradley as Chen, David Gillespie as Selby and Mark Williams as Petersen. Clare Grogan also returned as Kochanski.

== Reception ==
"Balance of Power" was originally broadcast on the British television channel BBC2 on 28 February 1988. Although the pilot episode "The End" drew in over five million viewers, this figure was now tailing off slightly as the series progressed.

The first series of Red Dwarf had not been initially repeated, and Grant and Naylor were reluctant to allow it to be released on home video. This episode was eventually released in July 1993 on a video also containing "The End and "Future Echoes".

The episode was one of the least popular in Red Dwarf Smegazine readers poll in 1992 — it came in last of 30 episodes, with 0.1% of the votes.

== Remastering ==
The remastering of Series I to III was carried out during the late 1990s. Changes throughout the series included replacement of the opening credits, giving the picture a colour grade and filmising, computer generated special effects of Red Dwarf and many more visual and audio enhancements. Changes specific to "Balance of Power" include a new shot of Lister riding his bike down the ship's corridor, new re-shot scenes with new dialogue from Holly, pieces of dialogue removed entailing the 'black card' situation lines. A music cue has been added to scenes of Rimmer, when using Kochanksi's hologrammatic body, trying to distract Lister during his chef's exam. Also, certain shots and some inconsistent dialogue have been removed from the same scene.
