= Bodysnatcher (Red Dwarf) =

Unmade episode of Red Dwarf

"Bodysnatcher" was a partly finished script that was written but unused for the first series of the BBC sci-fi sitcom Red Dwarf. It involved the now intangible Rimmer attempting to construct a body of his own using components of Lister's—such as hair.

== History ==
"Bodysnatcher" was one of the scripts to be handed around during the interview process for the main casting, although at this point it was unnamed. This script allegedly caught the attention of Peter Ridsdale-Scott, the commissioner for BBC Manchester that he read on the train bound for BBC London. Alfred Molina and Alan Rickman, who were auditioning for Lister and Rimmer, performed their audition from this script.

The episode was rehearsed during the original studio dates for Red Dwarf, but actual production was not possible due to strike action. For the remount, it was identified as the "weakest" episode, and replaced by "Me^{2}", at the end of the run.

One of Cat's lines:

I've eaten five times, I've slept six times, and I've made a lot of things mine. Tomorrow, I'm gonna see if I can have sex with something!

was originally in this episode's script, but was moved to "Confidence and Paranoia" when the original script was dropped.

== Home video release ==
To headline the release of Red Dwarf Remastered on DVD in November 2007, the same audio story board process used in recreating the lost episode of Series VII, "Identity Within", was used to create the "Bodysnatcher" episode. When the script was retrieved from the vaults of Grant Naylor offices, it was found to be without an ending. The writers Rob Grant and Doug Naylor, who went their separate ways during pre-production on the ITV series The 10%ers in 1994, collaborated on bringing the script into line with the series' continuity and giving it an end.

"Bodysnatcher" became the title feature of the DVD release, due in part to its name and the potentially misleading quality of the "remastered" moniker (as the remastering was done in 1998, not 2007). The DVD set was then entitled "Red Dwarf: The Bodysnatcher Collection". The episode was also included on the Blu-ray release of Red Dwarf I-VIII.
