= Red Dwarf: Infinity Welcomes Careful Drivers =

1989 novel by Rob Grant and Doug Naylor

Red Dwarf
- First edition (UK)
- Author: Rob Grant and Doug Naylor
- Language: English
- Series: Red Dwarf
- Genre: Comic science fiction
- Publisher: Penguin Books
- Publication date: 2 November 1989
- Publication place: United Kingdom
- Media type: Print (Paperback & Hardback)
- Pages: 304 (first edition, paperback)
- ISBN: 0-14-012437-3 (first edition, paperback)
- OCLC: 30363896
- LC Class: PR6064.A935 R4 1989
- Followed by: Better Than Life

Red Dwarf: Infinity Welcomes Careful Drivers is a best-selling science fiction comedy novel by Grant Naylor, the collective name for Rob Grant and Doug Naylor, co-creators and writers of the Red Dwarf television series, on which the novel is based. First published in 1989, the novel presents the plotline of the TV series as a cohesive linear narrative, providing expanded backstory of the Red Dwarf world and more fully developing each of the characters, particularly Dave Lister and Arnold Rimmer. The book incorporates elements and scenes from the first and second-season episodes The End, Future Echoes, Kryten, Me² and Better Than Life. In 1990, the book was followed by a sequel, Better Than Life.

The book has also been released in a 1992 omnibus edition and as an unabridged audiobook, read by Chris Barrie who plays Rimmer in the television show.

== Plot summary ==
The book begins in 2180 in a semi-dystopian future. Commercialism is still rife and in overdrive, with many contemporary corporations still in business, the concept of Intelligent, Alien Life has been fully disproved and most of Earth's natural resources have been depleted. However, most of the solid planets and moons in the Solar System have been colonised for habitation and mining purposes. Having ended up in a supply port on Saturn's orbiting moon Mimas after celebrating his 24th birthday by binge drinking on a Monopoly Pub Crawl in London, Dave Lister is trying to earn enough money for a shuttle ticket home by stealing taxis and picking up fares while sleeping in a bus station locker. But, since he always ends up losing the money, either by getting mugged or by getting drunk, it's obvious he won't be getting home any time soon.

One night Lister picks up a Space Corps officer calling himself 'Christopher Todhunter' (who is obviously wearing a fake moustache) asking to be taken to a plasti-droid brothel, only for the droid to malfunction and nearly rip off his private parts. This gives Lister an inspiration, and he quickly signs up with the Jupiter Mining Corporation, intending to get himself signed to a ship and going AWOL once it reaches Earth. Despite his lack of qualifications and the admissions officer deciding he had an attitude problem – Lister told him that he wanted to sign up to "explore strange new worlds, seek out new life and new civilizations and to boldly go where no person has gone before" – Lister is quickly assigned to the mining ship Red Dwarf as the lowest ranking crew member. On board he meets the drunken Petersen, who informs Lister that Red Dwarf will indeed be returning to Earth... after a four-and-a-half year round trip, much to Lister's dismay. Lister is assigned to Z-Shift as a technician, with duties that the service droids are considered too good for, and is introduced to his supervisor and roommate Arnold Rimmer, who Lister recognises as the Space Corps officer with the fake moustache. Unfortunately, Rimmer is also highly neurotic and pretentious, and he and Lister develop a mutual dislike.

Five months later, having settled into the dull, monotonous routine of life aboard Red Dwarf, Lister finds himself falling in love with senior officer Kristine Kochanski. The two embark on a passionate five-week love affair before Kochanski dumps him and returns to her boyfriend, whose name Lister can't remember. Meanwhile, Rimmer has been spending his time constantly trying and failing to pass the Astro-Navigation exam despite his best cheating efforts, as well as using the ship's stasis units (which freeze time for the person inside) to constantly de-age himself.

Lister, who has had enough of life on Red Dwarf since being dumped, realises that the stasis units could be his key to an instant arrival back on Earth. After studying the ship's regulations, he finds that smuggling an unquarantined animal aboard the ship is the least serious offence which carries a statutory sentence of time in stasis. On his next planet leave he brings a pregnant cat named Frankenstein back to Red Dwarf (after having her fully inoculated to ensure she won't actually present a danger to the ship) and ensures that he gets caught with her. After being hauled before the captain (an American woman with the unfortunate surname of Kirk), Lister lies and tells her that the cat was ill when he found her and refuses to reveal where he has hidden her. As a result, Lister gets his wish and is sentenced to stasis for the rest of the trip. He enters the unit fully expecting to exit and find himself back home.

Upon learning of Lister's sentence, Rimmer is furious that his nemesis is going to have all this time in stasis without getting older, and prepares to work on an immediate appeal. He never gets the chance, as one of the ship's nuclear reactors fails, letting loose a wave that kills everyone except Lister. Just before he dies, Rimmer (who was literally a few seconds away from the safety of the stasis booth where he planned to spend the evening) finds himself thinking of gazpacho. In the hold, Frankenstein and her kittens are safe from the radiation too.

Upon Lister's release from stasis, the ship's super-computer, Holly, whose screen avatar comes in the form of the disembodied, balding head of a middle-aged cockney man, explains to him that he (Holly) piloted Red Dwarf out of the Solar System to prevent radiation contamination. Holly could not release Lister until the radiation had reached a safe background level. However, because the leaked cadmium II had such a long half-life, Lister was kept in stasis for three million years. During this time, Holly has gone computer senile.

Lister is then told that not only is he all alone on the ship and millions of years away from Earth, but he is also likely the last human left alive. Lister slumps into nihilistic depression and promptly falls apart, walking around the ship naked and nearly drinking himself to death before he collapses. Lister wakes up in the medical unit to find Rimmer, whom Holly has selected as the person most likely to keep Lister sane and generated as a hologram. Lister instructs Holly to chart a course for Earth. The crew discovers another life on board, an intelligent humanoid who comes to be known simply as The Cat, a member of a race of cats evolved from the descendants of Frankenstein and her kittens after having survived the radiation blast deep in the ship's enormous cargo hold.

Due to three million years of constant acceleration, Red Dwarf breaks the light barrier, complicating things aboard as the crew begins to experience 'future echoes', brief glimpses of events that have yet to happen. Lister is worried when Rimmer tells him that one of the echoes shows him being blown up when attempting to fix the ship's navicomp (navigational computer). He tries everything to avoid it, but eventually, he accepts his fate when the device fails and he has to fix it. However, the repair operation succeeds, and an aged Lister appears as part of a future echo informing his younger self that it was his grandson he saw blown apart. Lister also learns that at some point in the future he will have twin sons.

Eventually, the ship slows and Holly succeeds in turning around and heading for earth. En route the crew retrieves the Nova 5, a ship that had been on an overpriced mission to advertise Coca-Cola when its mechanoid service robot, Kryten, caused it to crash by trying to wash the computer. After looking after the survivors of the crash for many, many years (the fact they were long dead notwithstanding), Kryten shuts down when he realises the truth, and Lister has to work hard to reactivate him. When he succeeds, he learns that the Nova 5 has a duality drive that could get him back to Earth within months. Lister, Kryten and an unwilling-to-work Cat use Red Dwarf's mining equipment to procure the fuel they need. Despite the Cat only putting in minutes of work each day and Kryten only helping by constantly serving tea and sandwiches, eventually, Lister gets what he needs.

Meanwhile, Rimmer has found a hologram generator aboard the Nova 5, meaning that another hologram can be created aboard Red Dwarf. After finding all the Nova 5 crew discs corrupted beyond repair, Rimmer suddenly gets an idea: who better as a companion for him than himself? At first, the two Rimmers get along great, moving in together and keeping each other motivated while supervising the repair of the Nova 5. However, the two begin to get on each other's nerves, trying to one-up each other. The original hologram-Rimmer despairs when his counterpart forces him to exercise and only allows him minutes of sleep a night. Things come to a head and the two demand that Lister switch one of them off. Lister chooses the original but asks about Rimmer's obsession with gazpacho. Rimmer tells his most painful memory: At a formal dinner with the captain, he complained that his Gazpacho Soup was cold, unaware that the Spanish dish is traditionally served cold (on top of being conned and stood up by a fake escort who was meant to pose as his date, and awkwardly botching a joke). As a result of all this, he was never invited to the Captain's Table again. Lister assures Rimmer that anyone could have made that mistake, then admits that the duplicate Rimmer has already been turned off (having lied to hear the gazpacho story). He promises never to mention the conversation again, but can't resist a little joke at the end.

The crew soon repairs the Nova 5's duality drive and return to Earth as heroes. Lister starts living in a replica of Bedford Falls from It's a Wonderful Life with a descendant of Kochanski, who looks and acts exactly like her ancestor and is even called Kristine who gives birth to two adult-minded twin baby sons; Rimmer marries a supermodel and becomes a successful businessman (with his company developing a solidgram body for Rimmer and a time machine to allow him to socialise with the greatest figures in history); and the Cat lives in Denmark in a palace surrounded by a moat of milk. It gradually becomes clear, however, that they're each living out their own improbable fantasies, and Lister, Rimmer and The Cat must accept the fact that they've not returned to Earth, but are trapped within an addictive virtual reality called Better Than Life, a game which is killing them, but is incredibly difficult to escape. Lister attempts to leave Bedford Falls on his own, but finds himself unable to leave his VR family on Christmas Eve. The book ends on the ominous note:

"But of course, in Bedford Falls, it was always Christmas Eve."

== Other versions ==
- Red Dwarf Omnibus: Released in November 1992 by Penguin Books, the omnibus contains the novels Red Dwarf: Infinity Welcomes Careful Drivers and its sequel Better than Life together in one volume, both slightly corrected and/or expanded. In addition, the omnibus also includes a jokey reproduction of the text that appeared on the infamous beer mat that the premise for the series was originally written on, a script for an episode of "Dave Hollins: Space Cadet", and the original script of the pilot episode "The End".
- Red Dwarf: Infinity Welcomes Careful Drivers (audiobook): A complete unabridged audiobook, read by regular cast member Chris Barrie (who plays Arnold Rimmer in the series) was released by Laughing Stock Productions in 1992. It has a total play time of about eight hours and 15 minutes, and is available in a variety of formats, including digital download. A much shorter abridged version also circulates.
- BBC Radio 7 Abridged Reading: In December 2009, BBC Radio 7 broadcast an abridged version of the audiobook, read by Chris Barrie as a series of six half-hour episodes. This version was originally broadcast on the BBC World Service in the mid-1990s.

== See also ==
- Red Dwarf
- Simulated reality
