= Noel Coleman =

English actor (1919–2007)

- Born: Noel Philip Coleman; 26 November 1919; Leicester, Leicestershire, England
- Died: 12 October 2007 (aged 87); England
- Education: RADA
- Occupation: Actor

Noel Coleman (26 November 1919 – 12 October 2007) was an English actor who appeared in many television roles.

== Early life ==
Coleman trained at the Royal Academy of Dramatic Art.

== Career ==
Coleman appeared in the 1969 Doctor Who serial The War Games as General Smythe and in Red Dwarf as the Cat Priest in the episode "Waiting for God". In the mid-1980s he had a recurring role in the Channel 4 soap opera Brookside as Brian Palmer.

Coleman played General Webb in the BBC's eight-episode series The Last of the Mohicans in 1971. Other television appearances included: Emergency – Ward 10, The Adventures of Robin Hood, The Diary of Samuel Pepys, Z-Cars, The Invisible Man, Dixon of Dock Green, The Avengers, Play for Today, Doctor at Large, The Top Secret Life of Edgar Briggs, The Fenn Street Gang, Sykes, Yus, My Dear, Emmerdale, The Adventures of Black Beauty, Happy Ever After, The Duchess of Duke Street, Mind Your Language, Terry and June, The New Statesman, Chancer, Lovejoy and The Detectives. His film roles included appearances in You Can't Escape (1956), Our Miss Fred (1972), Burke & Hare (1971), Edge of Sanity (1989) and Under Suspicion (1991).

Coleman's stage work included appearances in the West End and on Broadway. He was the original narrator of Captain Pugwash in 1957, before being replaced first by Howard Marion-Crawford, then by Peter Hawkins.
