= John Lenahan =

American entertainer (born 1961)

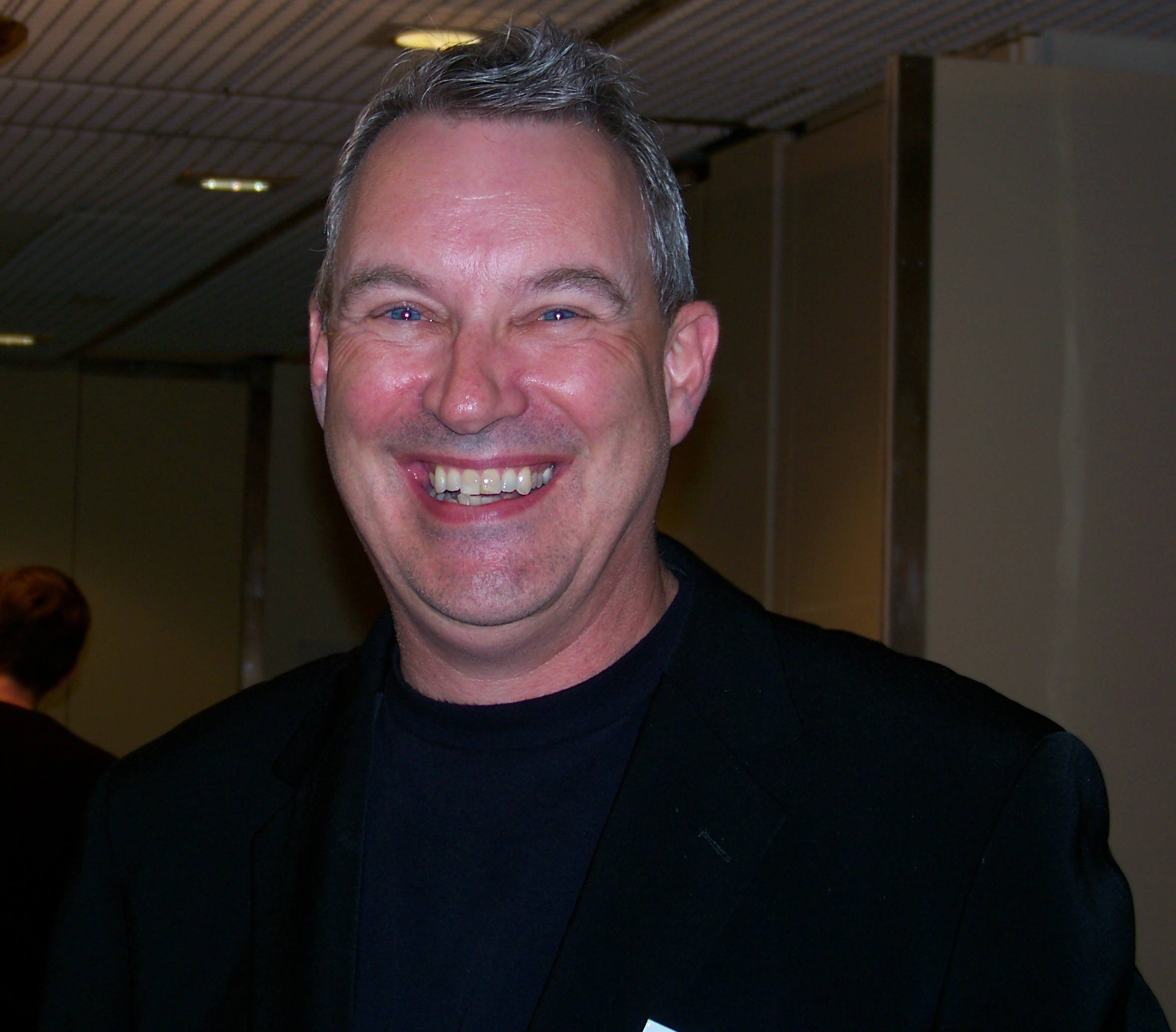
- John Lenahan in 2009.
- Born: 1961 (age 63–64); Philadelphia, US
- Occupation(s): Illusionist, magician, comedian, writer, actor, voice actor
- Years active: 1988–present
- Website: www.johnlenahan.com

John Lenahan (born 1961 in Philadelphia, US) is an American illusionist and entertainer resident in the UK since 1984. A successful corporate entertainer, he came to greater fame as a result of a 1994 appearance on the BBC One show How Do They Do That? explaining the sleight of hand trick known as Three-card Monte, as a result of which he became the first person in 85 years to be expelled from The Magic Circle. His subsequent television appearances have included his own 1997 series for BBC Two, Stuff the White Rabbit; and the Secrets of Magic specials for BBC One. He is a former holder of the title Street Magician of the Year.

Lenahan also provided the voice of Talkie Toaster in the first series of Red Dwarf and presented a 1987 factual series on BBC Two called The Open Road. The 1987 series featured Lenahan travelling across the UK and finding out about the lives and traditions of British people.

Lenahan's first novel, Shadowmagic, was originally released on podiobooks.com by John himself, then later picked up by The Friday Project/HarperCollins in the UK. His second novel, The Prince of Hazel and Oak, was released as a paperback in April 2011, and the third and final instalment, Sons of Macha, was released March 2013. It was announced in early 2022 that Lightning Books would publish Son of Shadow, taking the characters from the Shadowmagic trilogy into the next generation, in July of that year.
