= Arnold Rimmer =

Fictional character in Red Dwarf

Arnold Judas Rimmer BSC, SSC
- Red Dwarf character
- First appearance: "The End" (1988)
- Created by: Rob Grant and Doug Naylor
- Portrayed by: Chris Barrie

In-universe information
- Aliases: Ace Rimmer, Billy Doyle, Dangerous Dan McGrew, The Mighty Light
- Nicknames: Goal Post Head, Alphabet Head, Smeghead, Trans-Am Wheel-arch Nostrils, Grand Canyon Nostrils, Bonehead, Captain Bollocks, Ace-hole, Rimmsy, Captain Sadness
- Species: Human (hologram)
- Gender: Male
- Occupation: Technician, Second Class (series), Technician, First Class (books/The Promised Land)
- Family: Lecturer Rimmer (stepfather); Mrs. Rimmer (mother); John Rimmer (half-brother); Frank Rimmer (half-brother); Howard Rimmer (half-brother) (Note: Frank is first named as Rimmer's brother in "Better Than Life" (1988), while John and Howard are named in "Polymorph" (1989). In "The Beginning" (2012), the man Rimmer thought was his father (played by Simon Treves) confirms in a recorded message that he is not in fact Rimmer's father.)
- Relatives: Dungo the Gardener (biological father); Michael McGruder (son; Last Human continuity only)

Arnold Judas Rimmer is a fictional character and one of the main characters of the science fiction sitcom Red Dwarf, played by Chris Barrie. Rimmer is a second-class technician and the de jure leader of the mining ship Red Dwarf. Portrayed as snobbish, pedantic, and self-centred, Rimmer is unpopular with his crewmates and is often the target of insults and general ridicule.

After he is killed by a radiation leak during an ellipsis in the series' first episode "The End" (1988), Rimmer is present for most of the series as a computer-generated hologram, indicated by the 'H' symbol on his forehead. From series I-V, Rimmer is intangible as a hologram and unable to interact with his environment, referred to in-universe as "soft light". Come the series VI episode "Legion" (1993), Rimmer's Light Bee is upgraded by the titular character to a "hard light" hologram where he is now able to interact with his surroundings as well as being essentially indestructible, yet still able to feel pain. Following the character's departure in the series VII episode "Stoke Me a Clipper" (1997), Rimmer is absent from the show until series VIII, where a human version of Rimmer is shown having been resurrected by nanobots with no memory of the hologrammatic Rimmer's experiences and only those of Rimmer prior to the radiation leak in the first episode (likely from when he had his personality disc last updated before his death). Following a ten-year hiatus after series VIII, the character reappeared as a hologram in the miniseries Back to Earth (2009) onward. Why he became a hologram again, or what happened to the character at the end of the series VIII episode "Only the Good..." (1999) has never been revealed. (Note: Doug Naylor said in a 2020 interview that the Rimmer from Back to Earth onwards is the original Rimmer, having returned after being last seen in the series VII episode "Stoke Me a Clipper" when he left to become the next Ace Rimmer, although this has never been mentioned or confirmed within the show itself.) For a brief time in the feature-length special The Promised Land (2020), Rimmer is temporarily upgraded to Diamond Light, an advanced combination of both soft and hard light.

The creators of the series acknowledge that Rimmer's surname comes from a snobby prefect with whom they attended school. They joke that only the boy's name was used, and not his personality because "that would imply he had one".

== Fictional history ==
=== Television ===
==== 1980s ====
Resurrected as a "soft light" hologram, Rimmer was unable to touch or interact with his environment until the series VI episode "Legion" where he became a "hard light" hologram.

Rimmer first appeared in Red Dwarf's first episode "The End" (1988), where he is characterised as second technician on board the mining ship Red Dwarf, ranking above Dave Lister (Craig Charles), the lowest ranked crew member on board the ship with whom he shares quarters, and below all four of the service robots. As a technician, Rimmer does maintenance work on vending machines that not even the robots are assigned to. Rimmer is shown having difficulty revising for his "engineer's exam" which he hopes to pass and become an officer after having failed prior to the episode, and he reveals that he was not academically educated like others who had become officers. After Lister is awakened from stasis, where he was put as punishment for bringing an unquarantined cat on board, the ship's computer Holly (Norman Lovett) tells Lister that the ship's crew died in a radiation leak from a drive plate Rimmer had improperly repaired and Lister was kept in stasis until the radiation levels returned to normal three million years later. Rimmer is depicted as having been brought back to life as a hologram, having the same drives, feelings and emotions as the human Rimmer, but being unable to touch anything. The only other survivor on board Red Dwarf is a creature called "Cat" (Danny John-Jules), a descendant of Lister's pregnant cat who was safely sealed in the hold along with her unborn kittens during the radioactive crisis.

By the time of "Future Echoes" (1988), Rimmer claims to have taken the "astronavigation exam" without passing nine times, or ten, "if you count the time he had his spasm". He also claims in this episode that his father had said, "Shiny clean boots and a spanking short haircut, and you can cope with anything," right before "that unfortunate suicide business".

In "Balance of Power" (1988), Holly reveals that the reason Rimmer was brought back as a hologram was because, in Holly's judgment, Rimmer was the best person to keep Lister sane because the two had "shared fourteen million words between each other", making Rimmer the crew member with which Lister had the most interaction; in Holly's judgment, the fact that their interactions were almost entirely antagonistic was irrelevant. Lister later asks Rimmer where the disc which contains Navigation Officer Kristine Kochanski's (C P Grogan) hologram has been hidden so that Lister could go on a date with her, but Rimmer refuses to switch his own disc off to bring back Kochanski for an evening due to the risk that Lister might not turn Rimmer's hologram on again. Holly has the ability to override Rimmer and switch his disc off but cannot do so because Rimmer outranks Lister and he is programmed to prioritise the former's orders over the latter's.

In "Confidence and Paranoia" (1988), Lister believes that the only reason that Rimmer became a part of the love celibacy society was because he could not get a date, and he could never get a date because Rimmer's mother bought all of his casual clothes. Rimmer denies this, pointing out he went to bed with Yvonne McGruder, but Lister says she thought Rimmer was someone else due to her wonky vision from a concussion. Lister, with the help of a solid manifestation of Lister's confidence (played by Craig Ferguson), deduces where Kochanski's personality disc is hidden as well as a means of how the ship can power two holograms at once. Lister is still unable to go on a date with Kochanski, however, as the disc inside Kochanski's box has been swapped with one containing a duplicate of Rimmer.

In "Me²" (1988), Rimmer is shown moving in with his double as better company in the next bunkroom over from Lister. Rimmer's double reveals that all of Rimmer's brothers were academy educated, but he was not. Rimmer claims that this was because his father could not afford it. Rimmer also mentions taking a film course at night school, although he confuses a cartoon showing at the cinema in the episode with Citizen Kane. Lister watches a video of Rimmer's death, where his last words are "gazpacho soup". Demonstrating intense, literal self-hatred, the second cruelly insults and berates the first. Believing that Lister is going to wipe his hologram anyway because of the two Rimmers' constant arguing, Rimmer explained his dying remark as referring to a dinner at the captain's table with six officers, during which he made a faux pas where he had his gazpacho soup taken away to be brought back hot, not realising that gazpacho soup is meant to be served cold. This caused the officers at the table to laugh at him, and he was never invited back. The incident haunted Rimmer for the rest of his life (and beyond). Gradually, his obsession over the incident caused him to remember it as the most disastrous, imbecilic action of his life, and it undermined his self-esteem out of all proportion. Lister, displaying deep empathy, tried to comfort Rimmer, assuring him that "anybody could make a mistake like that." His confession complete, Rimmer prepares to be wiped, but Lister admits that he had already wiped the second Rimmer instead; Lister had allowed Rimmer to believe his "death" was imminent because Lister wanted to know what the "gazpacho soup" remark meant, and he knew that Rimmer would never tell him under any other circumstances.

Despite "Future Echoes" having previously suggested that Rimmer's father killed himself, according to a letter received from Rimmer's mother in "Better Than Life" (1988), Rimmer's father (played by John Abineri) had died peacefully in his sleep and Rimmer appeared unaware of how his father had died before Lister read out to Rimmer what his letter said. Rimmer's backstory in this episode revealed that Rimmer had hated his father, who had fixated on Rimmer and his three brothers to join the Space Corps and become officers when Rimmer's father had been rejected for being an inch below regulation height. To this end, he refused to allow them to eat unless they could answer complicated astronavigation questions. This led to Rimmer almost dying of malnutrition. Rimmer's father also stretched his sons on a traction machine to make them taller, causing Frank to be 6'5" by the time he was eleven. Rimmer disliked his parents enough to the point where he divorced them from himself when he was fourteen; Rimmer received paid maintenance until employment age and access to the family dog every fourth weekend.

According to "Thanks for the Memory" (1988), Rimmer did a maintenance course at Saturn Tech. Rimmer also claims that his sexual liaison with McGruder was the only point in his entire life he had had sex.

In "Queeg" (1988), Rimmer mentions how, after being burnt once by a person he considered his best friend, he had considered no-one in his life to be "true friends", and that friends were only friends when it suits them. He explains that when he was fifteen, he had a "friend", Porky Roebuck, with Rimmer believing that Porky's father having an affair with Rimmer's mother proved how close he and Porky were. Porky and Rimmer went on a Space Scouts survival course together, where Porky was the ringleader of a plan to eat Rimmer; Rimmer being tied to a stake and having barbecue sauce poured on him before he was almost cooked. Lister believes that Porky was "only" bullying Rimmer.

"Parallel Universe" (1988) shows Holly's "Holly Hop Drive" trying to get to Earth within a few seconds. Instead, however, it lands the crew in a female-oriented parallel universe with another version of Red Dwarf; its crew including a female version of Rimmer called Arlene Rimmer (played by Suzanne Bertish). Regarding Rimmer as little more than a "discardable sex object", the female Rimmer sexually harasses and gropes Rimmer and tries to hypnotise him even after Rimmer shows no interest.

In "Backwards" (1989), Rimmer facilitates a driving test for the mechanoid Kryten (Robert Llewellyn), where Kryten causes the Starbug 1 shuttle to fall into a time hole. The ship crash lands on Earth in a reality where time runs backwards, leaving Kryten, Rimmer and Holly (now played by Hattie Hayridge) stranded. Rimmer and Kryten start working as the novelty act "the Sensational Reverse Brothers" and begin to enjoy life in this new reality, but after three weeks, they are fired by a pub manager (Arthur Smith) for a fight that Rimmer and Kryten only become involved in later that night. Lister and the Cat come to rescue Rimmer, Kryten and Holly in another Starbug to get back to Red Dwarf.

According to backstory in "Marooned" (1989), Rimmer did not lose his virginity to McGruder, but to a girl Rimmer met at cadet school called Sandra in the back of his brother's car. However, when adapted in the novel Better Than Life (1990), it is revealed Rimmer was lying.

In "Polymorph" (1989), Rimmer considers the relationship he had with his brothers to be "close". He mentions that he was the butt of the "occasional" practical joke growing up. Despite varying from apple pie beds and black eye telescopes to hiding a small land mine in Rimmer's sandpit, Rimmer believes that none of this was "sinister". Rimmer says that some considered his mother (played by Kalli Greenwood) to be cold and aloof, but himself believes that she had no time for fools. Rimmer believes this to be "tragic", because they would otherwise have got on "famously".

In "Timeslides" (1989), Lister is seen travelling back in time by entering a photographic slide with mutated developing fluid, and he tells his 17-year-old self (played by Emile Charles) how to gain a successful multi-billion-pound (Note: The "dollarpound" currency was not mentioned in the series until the following episode "The Last Day" (1989).) business empire with 58 houses by inventing the "tension sheet" so that he would not join the Space Corps and get trapped on Red Dwarf in deep space. By becoming the inventor of the tension sheet and never joining the Space Corps, Lister's entire timeline is altered, causing Kryten to never be rescued and the Cat race to have never existed. Rimmer is left on his own with Holly and tries going back further in time to his eight-year-old self's (played by Simon Gaffney) days in boarding school so that he invents the tension sheet. Rimmer unwittingly restores events to how they were before by causing the original inventor of the tension sheet — Thickie Holden (Stephen McKintosh), who is in the same dorm room as Rimmer and overhears Rimmer speaking to his younger self — to become the one who patents the tension sheet, but for reasons unclear to both Holly and Rimmer, Rimmer somehow changes his past so that he is alive back on Red Dwarf. His happiness is short-lived, however, as he dies within minutes anyway after hitting a box containing explosives.

Rimmer is seen in the next episode, "The Last Day" (1989), once again as a hologram. According to his backstory, Rimmer's parents were "Seventh-Day Advent Hoppists" and believed that every Sunday should be spent hopping, because their version of the Bible had a misprint in 1 Corinthians 13 and they had interpreted this passage literally. He mentions that the first time he was French kissed was from his uncle Frank while he was asleep. Frank had inadvertently gone into Rimmer's bedroom instead of Rimmer's mother's bedroom.

==== 1990s ====
According to Lister in "Justice" (1991)--and in the novels—before the nuclear accident that killed the crew of Red Dwarf, Rimmer was in charge of "Z Shift", and it occupied his every waking moment. Lister said that Z Shift's "most vital responsibility" was making sure the vending machines did not run out of fun size Crunchie bars.

In "Dimension Jump" (1991), an alternate Arnold Rimmer, whose friends call him "Ace", is shown as a successful and heroic test pilot in the Space Corps and commander who crosses dimensions to meet another Rimmer — the hologrammatic Rimmer living on Red Dwarf. Ace's interdimensional ship collides with the Starbug shuttle, causing it to crash land on an ocean planet. With Lister's help, Ace repairs Starbug's starboard engine. After returning to Red Dwarf, Ace decides he cannot stay as he could not bear to be near the weaselly Rimmer of this universe. Ace cannot return home but decides to explore other realities with "a billion other Arnold Rimmers to meet." Ace explains that the diverging point in their lives where Ace gets his big break and Rimmer does not is that at the age of seven; Ace was held back a year in his class while Rimmer advanced as normal. Being kept down a year was, according to Ace, what changed him and made him fight back.

According to "Meltdown" (1991), Rimmer's only physical presence is a small "light bee"; a piece of hardware which buzzes around and projects his holographic image. This has been contradicted on a few occasions by his ability to move completely through solid objects such as walls or by the ability of solid objects or living characters to pass completely through Rimmer. A theory amongst fans is that the 'Light-Bee' technology had come from the Nova-5, with Kryten.

In "The Inquisitor" (1992), the crew is targeted by the eponymous Inquisitor, an immensely powerful and immortal android who survived to the end of reality and determined that the only point of existence was to live a worthwhile life, and now roams the timeline erasing the worthless from history. In a rare moment of self-reflection, Rimmer recognises that he has made no contributions to the world and fears being erased. However, when judged by the Inquisitor he claims that he never had the potential to be anything more than he is, admitting that he is "nothing" but that also "from what I started with, nothing was up". The Inquisitor finds this argument convincing and determines that, by his own meagre standards, Rimmer has justified his existence.

In "Demons and Angels" (1992), Red Dwarf is blown up when the beam of a device called the triplicator is put into reverse, putting the engine core into meltdown, while creating a "high" and "low" version of Red Dwarf, complete with their own versions of Rimmer (both played by Barrie). Before the lifespans of both versions of Red Dwarf expire after an hour, the crew collect pieces of the triplicator from both Red Dwarfs and restore the original Red Dwarf by amalgamating the two copies with a rebuilt triplicator. The "high" version of Rimmer has his light bee crushed by Lister when Lister's "low" self controls Lister into doing this by remote control, while the "low" version disappears with his version of Red Dwarf.

In "Back to Reality" (1992), ink from a "despair squid" causes Lister, Rimmer, the Cat and Kryten to share a hallucination, with the hallucinations attacking things they each consider "quintessential to [their] self-esteem". In the hallucination, Rimmer believes he is a vagrant with a coat smelling of yak's urine called Billy Doyle, with Lister being his more important half-brother, a totalitarian fascist mass murderer called Sebastian. Kryten also explains that because "Billy" has the same upbringing growing up with "Sebastian", Rimmer could not blame his own shortcomings on Rimmer's parents. The four nearly commit suicide together, but a mood stabiliser saves them at the last second.

In "Psirens" (1993), Kryten explains that Red Dwarf was "stolen", with the crew now based inside Starbug chasing after Red Dwarf to recover it.

In "Legion" (1993), Rimmer encounters a being known as Legion (Nigel Williams), who upgrades Rimmer's projection unit from "soft light" to "hard light", giving him a physical form and the ability to interact directly with the world, in addition to making him virtually indestructible.

In "Emohawk: Polymorph II" (1993), an emotion-leeching "emohawk" attacks Starbug and consumes Rimmer's bitterness, turning him into his "Ace Rimmer" persona. The emohawk is captured, and Lister freezes it with liquid dillinium. The crew plan to extract the emohawk's DNA strands and re-inject Rimmer with them to return his emotions to normal, but the Cat clumsily freezes everyone else before this can be done.

In "Rimmerworld" (1993), Rimmer steals an escape pod locked on course with the nearest habitable planet. Because of the time dilation caused by the pod going through a wormhole, it takes 600 years from Rimmer's perspective for Starbug to catch up with him, even though it is only moments from the point of view of Starbug. In the meantime, using cloning equipment inside the pod, Rimmer uses his DNA to create a society of thousands of Arnold Rimmers (all played by Barrie), who backstab Rimmer and imprison him before Lister, the Cat and Kryten rescue him centuries later.

In "Out of Time" (1993), Rimmer mentions that all trace of Red Dwarf has been lost. In the episode, a Starbug from fifteen years hence arrives, with Lister, Rimmer, Cat and Kryten's future selves intending to copy some components from the present Starbug's time drive so they can fix the fault in their own drive and continue their lives of opulence, socialising with notorious figures of history such as the Habsburgs, the Borgias, Louis XVI, Adolf Hitler, and Hermann Göring. Lister tells the future crew to leave, and the future Starbug fires upon the present day one, apparently killing the crew and blowing Starbug up.

In the following episode, "Tikka to Ride" (1997), Lister mentions in a video log that the future Starbug destroying the Starbug of the present meant the time drive they had used ceased to exist in both the present and the future, or in other words, killing the present crew of Starbug in the present also killed the crew in the future, making it impossible for the future crew to travel back in time to kill themselves in the present. The Cat later mentions in the episode that time returned to the point before the time drive was discovered. As for Rimmer, he either forgot about his attempt to destroy the time drive at the end of Out of Time, or kept his act of selfless heroism a secret, knowing no-one would believe him if he told them.

In "Stoke Me a Clipper" (1997), Rimmer is approached by a dying Ace Rimmer (played by Barrie), who is not the Ace Rimmer which Rimmer had met previously, nor an immediate replacement but a distant successor and a hard light hologram with a damaged light bee. Ace asks Rimmer to become a defender of the multiverse upon Ace's death. Although initially hesitant, Arnold finds himself rising to the challenge and leaves to start his new life. Lister, for a time, desperately misses him, and it takes a therapeutic song by a simulation of Rimmer (played by Barrie), shown in "Blue" (1997), to remind him what a horrible presence he could be.

When Red Dwarf is restored by Kryten's nanobots at the end of the episode "Nanarchy" (1997), the entire crew is restored to life as well by a new set of nanobots created by Holly (again played by Norman Lovett) after Kryten's had gone missing, including Rimmer, as shown in Back in the Red (1999). Because he is resurrected as he was at the time of the accident, he lacks any of the growth that the "other" Rimmer has gone through since the series began, reverting him back to his original persona. In Back in the Red, Lister, Rimmer, Kryten, Cat and Kochanski (now played by Chloë Annett) are sentenced to two years in the ship's brig for misuse of confidential information. In "Cassandra" (1999), the five of them get signed up by Lister to the convict army the Canaries after Holly lies to Lister that they are a singing troupe.

In "Only the Good..." (1999), when a corrosive microorganism is shown destroying Red Dwarf and everyone else evacuates to a mirror universe, Rimmer is trapped on the disintegrating ship. At the end of the episode, he encounters the Grim Reaper, who announces that Rimmer is dead and then tells him that they will travel to the River Styx. Rimmer interrupts him, saying "Not today, matey!", knees him in the groin, says "Remember, only the good die young!", and flees.

==== 2000s ====
In Red Dwarf: Back to Earth (2009), set nine years later, Red Dwarf is intact; the human race is apparently "virtually extinct" in the universe apart from Lister again; Lister, Rimmer, the Cat and Kryten are the only people on board the ship; and Rimmer is shown to be the original hard light hologram version and the most senior officer on board again; how these have come about is not explained onscreen. In this special, a female "despair squid", whose ink causes joy and elation instead of despair to defend herself, causes Lister, Rimmer, the Cat and Kryten to share a hallucination where they believe they are fictional characters from a TV series called Red Dwarf, and their dimension is "invalid". This leads them to be shown being pulled into the nearest "valid" reality. They confront the "Creator" of Red Dwarf (Richard O'Callaghan) on a version of 21st century Earth who is ready to kill off the characters, and Lister accidentally kills him. The four subconsciously realise that they're hallucinating, and they wake up on board Red Dwarf. Kryten and Rimmer speculate that they were able to choose whether or not they wanted to wake up because of the strengthened antibodies of the four from the previous encounter with the despair squid.

==== 2010s ====
In "Trojan" (2012), Rimmer discovers that one of his brothers, Howard (Mark Dexter), serves as a hard light hologram on a Space Corps vessel. Rimmer lies to his brother, telling him that he is the captain of the abandoned space vessel Trojan. To his surprise, he finds that Howard is, like him, a vending machine repairman who became the superior officer on his ship. In Howard's case this followed an attack by Simulants. Howard is mortally wounded during a skirmish with the rogue Simulant who killed the crew, Sim. Crawford (Susan Earl), and Rimmer takes the opportunity to further lie to Howard on his deathbed about his lifestyle.

According to Rimmer's backstory in "Lemons" (2012), Rimmer was given the middle name "Judas" because Judas, as characterised by the religious denomination that Rimmer's mother belonged to, the Church of Judas, embodied all of the traits Rimmer's mum wanted him to have. According to the Church of Judas, Jesus asked Judas, whom the Church believed was Jesus' twin brother, to swap places with him; Judas sacrificing himself and his reputation so that Jesus would appear to have been resurrected after showing up following the crucifixion of Judas-as-Jesus.

In a flashback depicted in "The Beginning" (2012), Rimmer is shown during his youth (played by Philip Labey) attending Io Polytechnic on Io, where one of his lecturers covering psychological profiling is the man he believes is his father, Lecturer Rimmer (now played by Simon Treves). After Rimmer is late for a lecture, Lecturer Rimmer uses Rimmer as a test subject in a social experiment regarding peer pressure. Three million years later, the hologrammatic Rimmer is seen on board Blue Midget being given the task of planning out a defensive strategy against a Simulant attack fleet; after failing to come up with one, Rimmer plays a recorded message from Lecturer Rimmer in an attempt to escape his feeling of being weighed down by his father's expectations. In the message Lecturer Rimmer, thinking that by now Arnold has achieved enough, reveals that Arnold is not his son, but that his real father was the family gardener Dungo. This revelation liberates Rimmer from the spectre of his lineage on the grounds that he has accomplished a great deal by the standards set by his biological father, and he is able to formulate a successful plan of attack that destroys the Simulant vessels before returning to Red Dwarf.

It is strongly implied in this episode that this version of Rimmer remembers dying from the radiation leak but also remembers saving the ship from the corrosive micro-organism that was devouring it in the episode "Only the Good...". This is a combination of the respective memories of the hologram Rimmer, who later became Ace, and the resurrected Rimmer who faced Death in the Series VIII cliffhanger. However, attempts by Rimmer and Kryten to explain how he saved the ship at the end of that series are interrupted.

In "Officer Rimmer" (2016), Rimmer is promoted to first lieutenant by a bio-printed copy of Captain Herring (Stephen Critchlow), when Rimmer saves Herring's ship the Nautilus by a fluke. He separates Red Dwarf by instigating a class system, and he sets up an officers' club featuring copies of himself (played by Barrie). Rimmer accidentally creates a monstrous amalgamation of Rimmers (also played by Barrie) that absorbs all the other Rimmers apart from the original. Rimmer resigns his rank, again becoming second technician, so he can leave the officers' corridor and get to safety. Lister, Cat and Kryten subsequently kill the monster.

According to backstory in "Timewave" (2017), when Rimmer was six, his parents sent him to a different prep school, St Tremble's, so he could get his confidence back after being ridiculed every day and wedgied every night. According to Rimmer, games were not competitive there, and everyone won a "you're really special" trophy on sports day. He said that his sex life had been a "shambles" ever since one of Rimmer's brothers gave him sex advice at school that the most important thing was the clitoris; Rimmer misheard it as "to spit on her wrist".

In "Mechocracy" (2017), Kryten is elected president of the machines on Red Dwarf after running against Rimmer.

In "Skipper" (2017), Rimmer, in search of a fresh start, decides to leave his universe using a quantum skipper that can skip to other universes where he feels less of a loser. In his first jump to a new universe it is the moment just before he causes the radiation leak but, for an unexplained reason, he is a hologram with his old letter 'H' on his forehead when this happened. After multiple attempts at finding a suitable universe, Rimmer arrives in a universe where he is alive, married and a navigation officer. However, upon discovering Lister is more successful and rich than he is, Rimmer returns to his original universe and breaks the quantum skipper, finding the pain of living in that universe "too much".

==== 2020s ====
In The Promised Land (2020), Rimmer is disgusted by Lister's new hoarding habits, which have completely filled their former bunkroom to the brim with useless junk, so much so he refuses to go in there. After receiving a distress signal, Rimmer refuses to respond, deciding they are too old to be embarking on new adventures, ordering Kryten to erase the memory of receiving it from his memory. After being banished off Red Dwarf by the newly rebooted Holly (void of his old memories and computer-senilic personality), the crew eventually come across a ship possessing new and powerful technology, specifically related to holograms. Against Kryten's initial warnings, Rimmer is upgraded to 'Diamond Light', which grants his superpowers; however, Rimmer is quickly depleted of power and returns to his old form, his Light-Bee's battery now burnt-out, he is forced to be "plugged-in" to several power leads to stay online. After encountering three cat clerics, fleeing from their fellow felis sapiens under the command of cat-warlord, Rodon, who board the station. Rimmer alongside the crew are taken hostage briefly until Rodon, now at a distance, fires on the ship and allows the crew to escape.

Crashing on a desert moon, Rimmer is forced to power down further as he is considered a nonessential resource, going into a black-and-white state. Whilst the crew are chased by Rodon's battlecruiser, Cat angrily insists Rimmer is a simple machine. Rimmer rejects this initially, quoting "I think, therefore I am", however quickly loses confidence in this and enters an existential crisis. After the crew successfully escape into a sandstorm, Rimmer is comforted by Lister, who compares their dynamic to the sun and moon, producing moonlight even though the moon cannot initially generate it itself. By morning, the crew discover they are buried under the sand, however Rimmer formulates a plan to contact the rebooted Holly, which Kryten manages using an antenna extension from his hand. Rimmer tricks the rebooted Holly into downloading his former incarnation's memories, with the rebooted Holly believing he'll inherit his "wisdom" from all the years he was alive. After doing so, the restored Holly rescues the crew and they manage to return to Red Dwarf. However, the felis sapiens under Rodon are waiting for them, and Rodon orders their deaths by planting a bomb on Red Dwarf. Using the acquired Anubis Stone attained from the cat clerics, they once again transform Rimmer into his former "Diamond Light" incarnation, who uses his powers to dispose of the bomb off Red Dwarf and subsequently helps bring down Rodon's main battlecruiser in the following confrontation.

Kryten, in a state of disrepair since the beginning of the story, is now on his last legs. After some convincing of a very hesitant "Diamond Light" Rimmer, he decides to use his Anubis Stone on Kryten to save his life, though stripping him of his superpowers. However, Rimmer is given a final boost when the felis sapiens, freed of Rodon's rule, decide to worship him, having their armada manifest into a large 'H'.

=== Novels ===
In Red Dwarf: Infinity Welcomes Careful Drivers (1989), Rimmer is a First Technician. Rimmer first meets Lister while Red Dwarf is docked at Mimas, a moon of Saturn. There, Rimmer is under the persona of "Officer Christopher Todhunter" and dons a phony admiral uniform and false mustache. He encounters Lister, who has stolen the Mimas-equivalent of a taxi known as a 'Hopper' to earn money, and pays him to take him to the red-light district of the city where Rimmer plans to frequent a droid brothel, while lying and saying he intends to eat at a restaurant.

Unlike in the television series, Rimmer's incompetence does not cause the radiation leak that kills the crew. Instead the radiation leak is an entirely unrelated event caused by the negligence of a navigation officer.

In Better Than Life (1990), similar to the episode of the same name, the crew play Better Than Life, an extremely addictive virtual reality video game that slowly kills the user through tantalizing their yearnings by utilizing the user's subconscious desires. The crew slowly become engrossed in their individual fantasies, with Rimmer imagining himself as gaining enormous fame and adoration upon the crew's return to Earth and earning billions from memoirs and other deals. However, Rimmer's subconscious, unable to cope with good things happening to him, corrupts the game to make Rimmer's fantasy and later the other crew's fantasies go terribly wrong and make them want to leave the game. After Lister is trapped on another planet for over thirty years while the rest of the crew are trapped in the time dilation of a black hole, the now-sixty-year-old Lister has a heart attack while confronting a Polymorph, but Holly gives Rimmer instructions on how they can bring Lister back to life by taking him to a universe where time flows backwards.

The two novels follow divergent paths after the crew retrieve Lister from the backwards reality.

In Last Human (1995), Rimmer's one-night stand with Yvonne McGruder led to the birth of a son. Unbeknownst to either, there truly was mutual attraction, but both decided to wait for the other to make the first move after that one night—Rimmer to prove a point and McGruder because she was delusional due to her concussion—leading to their going separate ways. Yvonne transferred off Red Dwarf where she had Michael McGruder, who was born prior to the radiation leak that killed Rimmer and most of the crew on board Red Dwarf. She told him false stories of his father's courageous acts of valour and through these fictitious tales McGruder was inspired to become a Space Corps Marine and sign up for a dangerous mission on board the Mayflower, a large spaceship with terraformation capabilities, with the potential prospect of meeting his father, who via the black box of Red Dwarf he learned was resurrected as a hologram to keep the sole survivor, Lister, sane.

Following a series of events, Lister had spent a period of time alongside McGruder and a handful of survivors from the Mayflower, separate from the main crew of Rimmer, Kochanski, Cat, and Kryten. Upon their reunion with Lister, Rimmer was introduced to McGruder by Lister, who fainted at first glimpse of Rimmer, who also fainted when told who McGruder was. Later, encouraged by Lister, Rimmer confessed he was not the hero McGruder was told he was by his mother and that he should look up to her instead. However, McGruder was distraught by this and left, later being held hostage by Lister's Other Self, an evil doppelganger of the real Lister. When given the opportunity to incapacitate Lister's Other Self, Rimmer choked and was also taken hostage, further disappointing McGruder.

Imprisoned, Rimmer, with the help of Kryten, escapes and equips himself with a weapon he uses to defend the crew from Lister's Other Self, gaining the respect of Lister, Kochanski, and McGruder, but is shot through the light-bee and critically injured in the process. The crew manage to dispatch of Lister's Other Self but are quickly confronted by the Rage, a gestalt manifestation of pure anger, which threatens to destroy everything in its path, including the crew. Rimmer, via his light-bee, volunteers to deliver the Oblivion Virus, the antidote able to eliminate the Rage. Kryten uploads it onto Rimmer's light-bee and as the crew take refuge in nearby caves Rimmer flings himself into the gestalt, killing it. Following this, the crew set up a search-party, headed by McGruder, to retrieve Rimmer's light-bee and hopefully bring him back.

In Backwards (1996), after the crew spend a decade trapped on the backwards Earth, they return to their universe to find that Red Dwarf has been stolen and Holly basically destroyed by the Agonoids, a race of misanthropic robots. The crew gain a brief ally in the form of Ace Rimmer, an alternate and dynamic version of Rimmer who arrived in their world in a dimension-hopping prototype ship, but Ace subsequently sacrifices himself to save Lister from an Agonoid. When one Agonoid kills the rest of his race so that he can be the one to torture Lister, the crew are able to expel him into deep space, but the Agonoid is able to infect Starbug with the Armageddon Virus before they can return to Red Dwarf. In an attempt to fight it, Kryten purposely contracts it himself and, in a simulation of the American wild west, is the sheriff of a small town in a battle against the Apocalypse Boys, the simulated manifestation of the Armageddon Virus. Rimmer, alongside Lister and Cat, enter the simulation to help Kryten. However, the Apocalypse Boys prove stronger than anticipated and end up melting Rimmer's light-bee and destroying Kryten, as well as rendering Starbug inoperable. With nothing left to keep them in this reality, Lister and the Cat use Ace's ship to travel to another reality where their counterparts died while playing Better Than Life but Rimmer and Kryten are still alive.

In the abridged audiobook, as read by author Rob Grant, the wild west simulation section is cut and instead Rimmer's light-bee is sucked into deep space following a hostage crisis with the Agonoid, Djuhn'Keep, onboard Starbug.

== Personality ==
Rimmer's primary character traits include anal-retentiveness, over-adherence to protocol, cowardice, bitterness and a severely inflated ego which is likely a coping mechanism to counteract his deep-seated sense of self-loathing, which he tries but sometimes fails to hide from others. As the highest ranking survivor aboard the ship (despite being a hologram), Rimmer often deludes himself into believing that he is in charge and that he has somehow been moulding "his" crew into an effective spacegoing unit, despite the fact that the others tend to take suggestions from Lister or Kryten in a crisis. In "Blue" (1997), it is revealed that Rimmer keeps a "war journal" in which he twists events to depict himself as a hero who is braver than Lister, smarter than Kryten and cooler than the Cat.

Rimmer's poor repair work on the drive plate was responsible for the radiation leak that killed the crew, and Rimmer bore the guilt of this (although he also partly blamed Lister for the accident, as he was unable to help repair the drive plate due to being in stasis at the time). However, in "Justice" (1991), after Rimmer is sentenced to over 9000 years for the accident, Kryten successfully argues at his appeal that Rimmer's guilt is misplaced – as a second technician (and one who "couldn't outwit a used teabag"), he could not possibly have been responsible for (and indeed would not have been trusted with) work that might endanger the crew if not performed correctly. Kryten further argues that Rimmer only felt guilty for causing the accident because of his delusions about his importance to the mission, comparing him to a front-gate security guard who considers himself corporate head. Kryten then went on to state that Rimmer's only crime is that of being Arnold J. Rimmer, which should also serve as a punishment. In keeping with his defective personality, Rimmer continually objects to his own defense (despite its effectiveness) on the grounds that he believes he is being portrayed unfairly.

Rimmer was finally able to live his fantasy of commanding an army in the episode "Meltdown" (1991), leading an army of "good" wax-droids against a much larger force of "evil" wax-droids. Although Rimmer ultimately succeeds in destroying the opposing army, his forces are completely wiped out when he uses most of them as a diversion and then has Kryten turn up the heating to melt all the droids. In addition to his fondness for militarism, elitism and Hammond organ music, Rimmer also enjoys Morris dancing and is an authority on 20th century telegraph poles, especially those observed while trainspotting. Rimmer has also been attempting to learn Esperanto for eight years, but has failed miserably. In "Marooned" (1989), he reveals he used to play golf and hated people (like Lister) who abused the facilities.

Many episodes of Red Dwarf focus on the conflict between Rimmer's ego and his neuroses. In "Confidence and Paranoia" (1988), Rimmer manages to trick Lister into generating a hologram duplicate in order to provide him with a companion; however, as a consequence of Rimmer's self-loathing, in the follow-up episode "Me²" (1988), the two Rimmers are incapable of getting along, and their interaction becomes so bitter and hate-filled that the duplicate must be turned off. In "Better Than Life" (1988), Rimmer enters a simulated reality designed to fulfil all his desires. However the game instead tortures him, as Rimmer's self hatred is so great that his deepest desire is to make himself suffer. In "Terrorform" (1992), a "psi-moon" sculpted to reflect Rimmer's psychological make-up becomes a desolate, swampy hell-hole dominated by Rimmer's Self-Loathing, personified as a sadistic beast, with a metaphysical graveyard marking the "demise" of his various virtuous qualities. Despite his cowardice, and tendency to run from any kind of danger or fight, Rimmer is the member of the crew most willing to kill, preferably in the safest and most cowardly way possible, although, due to a mixture of cowardice, and the fact that for much of the series he cannot physically harm anyone, he seldom manages to. He attempts to coerce Lister to shoot a dangerous Simulant (Nicholas Ball) in the back (bemoaning the fact that said Simulant was currently awake), suggests shooting Kryten and Lister into space when they appeared on the ship in a timeline where they had been erased from history, suggests that he and Kryten eject Lister and Cat from Starbug when it is revealed that the ship lacks fuel to reach the nearest planet – although this is also prompted by the discovery that the ship only had air for seven minutes and was ended when Rimmer learned that his projection unit only had enough power for four minutes — and in a despair squid-induced hallucination of 21st century Earth, casually pushes a fellow hologram (Sophie Winkleman) into traffic after she repeatedly threatens to have him "erased" and claims that hologram-killing is "morally, ethically [...] fine". In "Officer Rimmer" (2016), Rimmer deems it better to sacrifice others for the safety of the crew.

Rimmer's personality flaws are in fact almost completely a result of his hang-ups. An alternative version of Rimmer, Ace Rimmer, who was kept back a year in school, learned humility and inner strength, and grew up to become a charming and well liked Space Corps test pilot, interstellar hero, and sexual seducer.

However, Rimmer is still capable of nobility, honour and love. When Red Dwarf encounters a holoship with an all-hologram crew composed of the "best and brightest" in the episode "Holoship" (1991), Rimmer desperately wants to join. A female officer aboard the ship, Nirvanah Crane, played by Jane Horrocks, falls in love with him and sacrifices her place on the ship for Rimmer, only for Rimmer to do the same in return for her. This act of nobility surprises even Rimmer himself. In "Out of Time" (1993), Rimmer is disgusted by his corrupt future self to the point where he'd rather do battle with him than surrender ("Better dead than smeg!"), Rimmer later frantically risking his life to save the others after their future selves kill them. In "The Beginning" (2012), Rimmer is also able to formulate a plan to save the crew from the Simulant Generals. Rimmer has also shown the capacity to respect other viewpoints in conflict with his own; in "The Last Day" (1989), he tries to convince Lister that he should respect Kryten's right to believe in Silicon Heaven in spite of it conflicting with Lister's own beliefs, "Lemons" (2012) sees Rimmer eager to meet Jesus despite being an atheist, and in "Samsara" he presents a well-reasoned argument about the flaws in the concept of the Karma Drive. In "Polymorph" (1989), Rimmer leads Kryten and Cat in the hunt for the intruder and in "Bodyswap" (1989), he takes charge of the hunt for Red Dwarf's self-destruct mechanism. Once Rimmer is sapped of his anger by the Polymorph, he is a conciliatory pacifist wishing to promote peace between the creature and various members of the crew and keen to not hurt anybody's feelings during their discussions. In "Backwards" (1989), he revels in his success as a showbiz performer and extols the virtues of a world without war, famine, crime or death. In "Tikka to Ride" (1997), Rimmer protests against abusing the Time Drive - the very thing he tried to destroy at the end of the previous episode- and chastises Lister for doing so.

== Appearance ==
Rimmer's status as a hologram in most episodes of Red Dwarf is shown by the 'H' on the centre of his forehead, leading to nicknames from the Cat, such as "alphabet head" and "goalpost head". Rimmer keeps his unmanageable hair relatively short, deciding that it makes him feel like more of a man. When Lister and the Cat respond to a drill too slowly, Rimmer argues for increased discipline and sensible haircuts, believing that "every major battle in history has been won by the side with the shortest haircuts" (resulting in the Cat insulting his hair-do by saying that he has hair like his, just not on his head).

Rimmer's Space Corps uniform changes several times during the course of the show. In the first two series it is a grey-and-beige shirt-and-tie ensemble; in Series III and IV this becomes a green suit with a shiny high-collared jacket, which is changed to red in Series V; in Series VI and VII, Rimmer's jacket becomes quilted and is red when he is in soft-light form and blue for hard-light (with a belt with his 'Light-Bee' remote attached); the alive Rimmer in Series VIII wears an all-beige uniform similar in design to the original, and a purple jumpsuit when he's imprisoned in "The Tank". In the 2009 three-part special Back to Earth, Rimmer wears a blue suit similar to his Series III and IV green suit but with the addition of a plain waist-high belt worn over the jacket and a quilted collar. From Series X onward, Rimmer sports a dark blue tunic; lacking the belt and light blue boots of the Back to Earth outfit.

The 'H' on his forehead also changes from series to series: it starts as a grey colour and a blocky shape; in Series III, it becomes bright blue and reflective; in Series V, it's changed to a thinner and more stylised font. His 'H' also briefly changes to a reflective red colour set inside a circle when he temporarily joins the holoship SS Enlightenment.

== Casting ==
Rimmer encounters his "female opposite" Arlene.

Among the actors who auditioned for Rimmer were Norman Lovett (cast as Holly instead), David Baddiel, Hugh Laurie, and Alfred Molina. Initially Molina was cast as Rimmer, however, the role was recast and filled by Chris Barrie, a professional voice-actor and impressionist. Barrie, who had originally auditioned for Lister, was familiar with Rob Grant and Doug Naylor having worked together on Son of Cliché and Spitting Image and with the producers on Happy Families and various Jasper Carrott productions. He has appeared in all but four episodes of the show, which he missed in series VII due to scheduling conflicts.

Rimmer was played by Chris Eigeman in the first American pilot and then by Anthony Fusco in the second pilot. The character's distinctive 'H' was replaced with a marble-shaped object in the first pilot, but the 'H' returned in the second one. Chris Barrie was given an offer to reprise his role, but turned it down for fear of being tied into a restrictive, long-term contract, which is common in American television production.

The female Rimmer, "Arlene 'Arnie' Rimmer", in the Series II episode "Parallel Universe" was played by Suzanne Bertish, an actress primarily known for her classical stage work. She had been asked by director Ed Bye to play the part. "Young Rimmer", who had minor speaking roles in three episodes in Series III and IV, was played by child actor Simon Gaffney. Series X episode "The Beginning" features another "Young Rimmer", this time at college on Io, who was played by Philip Labey.
