= Dave Lister =

Fictional character in Red Dwarf

David Lister
- Red Dwarf character
- The "Last Human"
- First appearance: "The End" (1988)
- Last appearance: Red Dwarf: The Promised Land (2020)
- Created by: Rob Grant and Doug Naylor
- Portrayed by: Craig Charles

In-universe information
- Aliases: Lister of Smeg, Cloister the Stupid, Sebastian Doyle
- Nicknames: Listy, Dave, Skipper, Dave "Cinzano Bianco" Lister, Spanners, Davey Boy
- Species: Human
- Gender: Male
- Occupation: Technician, Third Class; Bum (self-proclaimed)
- Family: Dave Lister (father, himself); Kristine Kochanski (mother)
- Spouse: Kinitawowi (GELF bride)
- Children: Jim Lister and Bexley Lister (in alternate realities); Dave Lister (himself)
- Relatives: Adopted by the Wilmot family "Gran" (grandmother)

David Lister, commonly referred to simply as Lister, is a fictional character from the British science fiction situation comedy Red Dwarf, portrayed by Craig Charles.

Lister is characterised as a third-class technician (the lowest ranking crewman) on the mining ship Red Dwarf spending his time performing tasks under the hated supervision of Arnold Rimmer. In the series, he becomes marooned three million years into the future, but maintains a long-standing desire to return to Earth and start a farm on Fiji and open a hot dog and doughnut diner, preferably with the one true love of his life, Kristine Kochanski, a navigation officer of Red Dwarf. As a character, Lister is lazy, slobbish, and unmotivated, but he frequently shows moral courage. He also likes Indian food, especially chicken vindaloo, which is a recurring theme in the series.

== Fictional history ==
=== Television ===
==== 1980s ====
Lister first appeared in Red Dwarf's first episode "The End" (1988), where he is characterised as third technician on board the mining ship Red Dwarf, ranking below his immediate superior Arnold Rimmer (Chris Barrie), with whom he shares quarters, and all four of the service robots as the lowest ranked crew member on board the ship. As a technician, Lister helps Rimmer with maintenance work on chicken soup vending machines that not even the robots are assigned to. Lister is shown having smuggled an unquarantined pregnant cat from the moon Titan on board Red Dwarf as part of his five-year plan to buy a farm on Fiji to bring along the cat, the cat's unborn kittens, and to get a sheep and a cow and breed horses. As punishment for bringing the cat on board, he is put into stasis for 18 months without pay.

Lister mentions that crewmember Kristine Kochanski (C P Grogan) (Note: Kochanski's rank on board Red Dwarf is later identified as Navigation Officer in the episode "Balance of Power" (1988).) was going to come with him to Fiji, but never told her before her death. The ship's computer Holly (Norman Lovett) tells Lister that while Lister was in stasis, a release of lethal radiation occurred on board as a result of a faulty repair carried out by Rimmer, killing the entire crew. As a result, Holly keeps Lister in stasis for three million years until the radiation levels return to normal. Lister is left as presumably the last human being in the universe, accompanied on Red Dwarf by a hologram simulation of Rimmer and a humanoid creature called "the Cat" (Danny John-Jules) that evolved from his cat, who was safely sealed in the hold along with her unborn kittens when the crew died. Lister tells Holly to set co-ordinates for Fiji, which has become the "promised land" in the religion of the Cat's people.

Lister's backstory in "Future Echoes" (1988) reveals that Lister's "grandmother" raised Lister, and headbutted the headmaster of Lister's school when Lister came bottom in French, leading to Lister's expulsion. Also in this episode, Red Dwarf is shown travelling faster-than-light, and this causes glimpses of the future, "future echoes", to appear to the crew. Rimmer sees what he believes to be Lister being killed in the drive room. After trying to change another future echo involving the Cat and ending up causing it instead, Lister accepts his fate when Holly asks for help to stop the navi-comp from overheating. Lister survives, and a future echo of Lister aged 171—who cannot see the younger Lister and Rimmer but remembers the conversation he had when he was Lister's age—explains that it wasn't Lister that Rimmer saw die, but Lister's second son, Bexley, who appeared in a photograph with his twin brother Jim as a child in another future echo. Lister realises that this means he is going to have two sons in the future. The elderly Lister from the future tells the present Lister to quickly take his camera to the medical unit. As Red Dwarf begins to slow down, Lister sees a future echo of himself from nearer to the present who is holding baby Jim and Bexley, and the present Lister takes the photograph of the Lister holding the babies, which had previously been seen on the bunkroom wall in a future echo.

In "Balance of Power" (1988), Lister is revealed to have pined after Kochanski; Lister mentioning that he had always been crazy about Kochanski but never acted on his feelings to ask her out or make love to her. Lister asks Holly why Rimmer was brought back as a hologram instead of Kochanski. Holly explains that this is because Rimmer was the best person to keep Lister sane, and that the two had shared fourteen million words between each other, compared to the 173 words Lister shared with Kochanski. Lister asks Rimmer where the disc which contains Kochanski's hologram has been hidden so that Lister could go on a date with Kochanski, but Rimmer refuses to switch his own disc off to bring back Kochanski for an evening due to the risk that Rimmer's hologram wouldn't be turned on again.

In "Waiting for God" (1988), Holly reads out the captain's confidential files on Lister, explaining that Lister's previous job before joining Red Dwarf was a supermarket trolley attendant, which he left because "he didn't want to get tied down to a career". After translating a holy book written by the Cat's people, Holly confirms that Lister is considered a god in the Cat's people's religion called Cloister, and that his plan of buying a farm on Fiji and opening up a hot dog and doughnut diner has become their idea of Heaven.

In "Confidence and Paranoia" (1988), Lister, with the help of a solid manifestation of Lister's confidence (played by Craig Ferguson), deduces where Kochanski's personality disc is hidden as well as a means of how the ship can power two holograms at once. Lister is still unable to go on a date with Kochanski, however, as the disc inside Kochanski's box has been swapped with one containing a duplicate of Rimmer.

In "Me²" (1988), Rimmer moves in with his double as better company in the next bunkroom over from Lister. After the two Rimmers' constant arguing, Lister decides to have one of them wiped to stop this. Knowing that Rimmer would never tell Lister otherwise, Lister tricks Rimmer into revealing Rimmer's "gazpacho soup" story while Rimmer's double is wiped instead; Rimmer believing that he was the one that was doomed.

According to Lister's backstory in "Kryten" (1988), Lister applied to art college after having failed his exams. He dropped out after 97 minutes however, after learning that there were lectures every day, "first thing in the afternoon". In this episode, the crew of Red Dwarf rescue a service mechanoid called Kryten (David Ross) from the crash landed spaceship the Nova 5. After Kryten begins serving Rimmer, Lister persuades Kryten to rebel against Rimmer (which includes showing him the movies Rebel Without a Cause and Easy Rider) and to become independent. Kryten changes the portrait of Rimmer he is painting to make it appear as though he was sitting on the toilet, and then pours soup onto Rimmer's bed sheets. Kryten takes Lister's space-bike and goes out to find a planet with an atmosphere where he can grow a garden, which had always been a dream of his.

Backstory in "Better Than Life" (1988) reveals that Lister's "dad" died when he was six. Lister's grandmother, while trying to explain to Lister that his dad wouldn't be coming back, said that Lister's dad had gone to the same place as Lister's goldfish. Lister thought she meant he was flushed down the toilet. Lister was eventually sent to a child psychologist after he was found with his head in the toilet bowl reading his father the football results.

In "Thanks for the Memory" (1988), when Rimmer had eight months of Lister's memory pasted over his own as a present to celebrate the anniversary of Rimmer's death, Lister recounts to Rimmer that Lister had gone out with a girl named Lise Yates (Sabra Williams), but the relationship ended because he did not want to be tied down, a fact that Lister later regretted. Rimmer also realises the memories he was given couldn't have actually happened because Rimmer remembers being an orphan even though both his parents were alive, meaning that at some point Lister himself had become an orphan.

In a possible future seen in the episode "Stasis Leak" (1988), Lister finds out that his future self from five years hence has gone back in time and married Kochanski three weeks before the accident which causes Red Dwarf to leave the Solar System; their wedding and honeymoon taking place while Kochanski is on planet leave at the Ganymede Holiday Inn. This version of Lister's future has still yet to be portrayed outside of "Stasis Leak" as of Series X.

"Parallel Universe" (1988) shows Holly's "Holly Hop Drive" trying to get to Earth within a few seconds. Instead, however, it lands the crew in a female-oriented parallel universe with another version of Red Dwarf; its crew including a female version of Lister called Deb Lister (played by Angela Bruce). Because of the laws of the female Lister's universe being different, Lister falls pregnant with his alternate self's child after a drunken sexual liaison with her.

At the start of "Backwards" (1989), some quickly scrolling text describes Lister's pregnancy leading to successful delivery of twin boys, Jim and Bexley. Because the twins were conceived in another universe where different laws apply, they reach eighteen years of age in three days. To save their lives, Lister returns them to their universe for their father (the female Lister) to raise them. Kryten is described as being found in pieces after his space-bike crashed on an asteroid shortly after these events. Lister rebuilds Kryten (now played by Robert Llewellyn), although he is unable to recapture his former personality.

According to backstory in "Marooned" (1989), Lister lost his virginity to Michelle Fisher at the age of twelve in one of the bunkers on the ninth hole of Bootle Municipal Golf Course.

In "Timeslides" (1989), Lister is seen travelling back in time by entering a photographic slide with mutated developing fluid, and tells his seventeen-year-old self (played by Emile Charles), who at this point is a singer-songwriter in a band called Smeg and the Heads, how to gain a successful multi-billion-pound (Note: The "dollarpound" currency would not be mentioned in the series until the following episode "The Last Day" (1989).) business empire with fifty-eight houses by inventing the "tension sheet" so that he won't join the Space Corps and get trapped on Red Dwarf in deep space. By becoming the inventor of the tension sheet and never joining the Space Corps, Lister's entire timeline is altered, causing Kryten to never be rescued and the Cat race to no longer exist. Lister is also seen living with the model and novelist Sabrina Mulholland-Jjones (Koo Stark), and according to Holly (now played by Hattie Hayridge), in this new timeline, Lister dies aged 98 after he crashes a plane he had lost control of while making love to his fourteenth wife. Rimmer unwittingly changes the timelines to set things exactly how they were, and Lister, the Cat and Kryten return to Red Dwarf.

Despite having previously mentioned his father and grandmother, backstory in "The Last Day" (1989) reveals that Lister never knew who his parents were because he was abandoned at the age of six weeks in a cardboard box underneath a pool table in a pub, with Lister never finding out why.

==== 1990s ====
Lister's previously established history with Kochanski where he barely interacted with her is retconned in "DNA" (1991), when Lister mentions Kochanski having "finished with [him]" back before the accident that killed her. Following this break up, he recalls going for a walk in the botanical gardens and looking at a squirrel, thinking, "You lucky little sod. You like your job, you're your own boss and you've got no woman trouble, so you'll never feel as bad as I feel now." This affected Lister enough for him to tell the crew of Red Dwarf that for a split second, he would have given anything to swap places with the squirrel.

In "Dimension Jump" (1991), an alternate Lister from another dimension, nicknamed "Spanners", is seen (also played by Charles). Lister explains that, after being told about Spanners by the Rimmer of that dimension—a successful test pilot called "Ace"—Spanners is a flight engineer in the Space Corps who is married to Kochanski with twin boys, Jim and Bexley, and, unlike Rimmer, Lister is pleased to learn of his success in a parallel universe.

In "The Inquisitor" (1992), Lister is put on trial by the legendary android known as the Inquisitor (John Docherty) to determine whether or not his existence is justified or a waste. After Lister is found unworthy of existence, the memory of Lister is erased, and the Inquisitor replaces Lister's life with that of an alternative Lister who never got a chance at life. This "Second Lister", played by Jake Abraham, is described by Kryten as "one of the many David Listers who never got a chance to exist", while Lister believes them to be "kind of sperms-in-law". This alternative Lister is killed by the Inquisitor, while Lister subsequently tricks the Inquisitor into erasing himself from existence, causing the memory of Lister to be restored.

In "Demons & Angels" (1992), Red Dwarf is blown up when the beam of a device called the triplicator is put into reverse, putting the engine core into meltdown, while creating a "high" and "low" version of Red Dwarf, complete with their own versions of Lister (both played by Charles). Before the lifespans of both versions of Red Dwarf expire after an hour, the crew collect pieces of the triplicator from both Red Dwarfs, and restore the original Red Dwarf by amalgamating the two copies with a rebuilt triplicator. The "high" version of Lister is stabbed to death when Lister's "low" self controls Lister into doing this by remote control, while the "low" version is shot down by bazookoid fire from the Cat.

In "Back to Reality" (1992), ink from a "despair squid" causes Lister, Rimmer, the Cat and Kryten to share a hallucination, with the hallucinations attacking things they each consider "quintessential to [their] self-esteem". In the hallucination, Lister believes he is Colonel Sebastian Doyle, a totalitarian fascist mass murderer who is section chief at "CGI" and head of the Ministry of Alteration, where he "change[s] people...from being alive people to being dead people". The four nearly commit suicide together, but a mood stabiliser saves them at the last second.

"Psirens" (1993) further contradicts the early series' depiction of Lister having never asked Kochanski out. In the episode, while rejogging Lister's memory following Lister awakening from two hundred years of deep sleep, Kryten explicitly explains to Lister that Kochanski dated Lister for three weeks before "discard[ing]" him for a catering officer. In the episode, Kryten explains that Red Dwarf was "stolen", with the crew now based inside the shuttlecraft Starbug chasing after Red Dwarf to recover it.

In "Out of Time" (1993), Rimmer mentions that all trace of Red Dwarf has been lost. In the episode, a Starbug from fifteen years hence arrives, with Lister, Rimmer, Cat and Kryten's future selves intending to copy some components from the present Starbug's time drive so they can fix the fault in their own drive and continue their lives of opulence, socialising with notorious figures of history such as the Habsburgs, the Borgias, Louis XVI, Adolf Hitler and Hermann Göring. The Lister from the future has also been damaged in an accident, having become nothing more than a brain in a jar. Lister tells the future crew to leave, and the future Starbug fires upon the present day one, apparently killing the crew and blowing Starbug up.

In the following episode, "Tikka to Ride" (1997), Lister mentions in a video log that the future Starbug destroying the Starbug of the present meant the time drive they had used ceased to exist in both the present and the future, or in other words, killing the present crew of Starbug in the present also killed the crew in the future, making it impossible for the future crew from ever going back in time to kill themselves in the present. The Cat later mentions in the episode that time returned to the point before the time drive was discovered.

In "Stoke Me a Clipper" (1997), Lister pretends to be a hostile knight who escaped from Starbug's artificial reality suite in order to prove Rimmer is heroic enough to take over as the new Ace Rimmer and leave Starbug for other dimensions to "right wrongs". Rimmer fires blank rounds at Lister, and Lister pretends to die, with Rimmer not realising this deception.

In "Blue (Red Dwarf)" (1997), Lister finds himself missing Rimmer's company after the hologram goes off on adventures with Ace Rimmer, but is alternately confused and horrified at the thought that he might have feelings for him, and after seeing Rimmer's ego-trip of a ride, declares their friendship officially over.

In "Ouroboros" (1997), Lister meets a Lister from a parallel dimension (played by Charles), when a "linkway" through "non-space" is opened when the membrane between the two realities temporarily collapses. Lister realises that that dimension's Lister is a hard light hologram. The parallel Lister explains that he was killed in the radiation leak that wiped out the crew of Red Dwarf. In a flashback, following Lister breaking up with Kochanski (now played by Chloë Annett) the previous week, the parallel Lister is shown returning to Red Dwarf and smuggling a cat on board, after a few days' shore leave on the moon Mimas—and not Titan as previously claimed—to get over Kochanski. This version of Kochanski later apologises for the Dear John letter she sent Lister the previous week. She describes her love life with Lister as having gone nowhere and amounting to "hanging out in [Lister's] bunk, eating delivery curries and having fantastic sex". She explains to Lister that she is back together with her ex, a chef called Tim. Kochanski discovers the unquarantined cat Lister smuggled on board and takes her, but is unable to kill her and hides her instead.

Back in the present, the parallel Lister explains that Holly brought him back as a hologram, and when the cat was discovered, Kochanski was the person who was punished and put into stasis instead. The original Lister also realises that the parallel Lister's relationship with Kochanski was rekindled. Kryten later tells the original Lister that after the parallel Lister's death, that dimension's Lister was originally a soft light hologram before becoming hard light, and this made him "caring in a way that most men aren't". Kochanski asks Lister to fill an in-vitro tube with Lister's DNA, as she hopes to one day have children. When Lister realises that he is his own father and Kochanski is "me ex-girlfriend and me mum", Lister hurries to retrieve the tube. Lister saves Kochanski's life during an attack on the linkway by a GELF spaceship, but Kochanski is subsequently stranded in Lister's dimension when the interdimensional rip self repairs, and becomes a new member of Starbug's crew. Lister says that after the baby Lister is grown in a uterine simulator, Lister travels back in time to leave his infant self (played by Alexander John-Jules) under a pool table at the Aigburth Arms pub. The story subsequently skips ahead to when this happens.

The official Red Dwarf website claims that the suggestion within "Ouroboros" is that the diverging point between Lister's timeline and Kochanski's alternate timeline happened when Kochanski takes "her" Lister's cat, meaning that "almost everything else [before] about [Kochanski's] timeline was supposed to have played out along similar lines to the main one".

In "Epideme" (1997), Lister has his right arm amputated in an attempt to rid his body of the Epideme virus (voiced by Gary Martin). Kochanski ultimately gets rid of the virus by temporarily stopping Lister's heart and containing the virus in deceased Red Dwarf crewmember Caroline Carmen's (Nicky Leatherbarrow) arm, injected with blood and adrenaline, and tricking the virus into thinking the arm belongs to Kochanski. In the following episode, "Nanarchy" (1997), Kryten tries looking for his self-repairing nanobots to rebuild Lister's arm. Returning to the part of space where they were last seen, the crew discovers Red Dwarf has been converted by the nanobots into a planetoid made of sand and Holly restored to his old settings (again played by Norman Lovett) and abandoned there, with the Red Dwarf Starbug spent years chasing after being a subatomic version shrunken down and eventually exploring Lister's laundry basket, and the remaining bits they didn't want being left on the planetoid. Kryten orders the nanobots to rebuild Lister's arm and turn the planetoid back into Red Dwarf.

In Back in the Red (1999), Holly creates a new set of nanobots to bring the entire crew on board Red Dwarf back to life after Kryten's had gone missing again. Included among the resurrected crew is Rimmer, after the hologrammatic simulation of Rimmer left Starbug. Lister, Rimmer, Cat, Kryten and Kochanski are sentenced to two years in the ship's brig for misuse of confidential information. In "Cassandra" (1999), the five of them get signed up by Lister to the convict army the Canaries after Holly lies to Lister that they're a singing troupe. During a mission with the Canaries, the mainframe computer of the SS Silverberg, Cassandra (Geraldine McEwan), who can predict the future with an accuracy rating of one hundred per cent, tells Lister that he chokes to death aged 181, while trying to remove a bra with his teeth.

In "Only the Good..." (1999), a corrosive micro-organism is shown eating apart Red Dwarf. After Rimmer tries and fails to obtain the formula for an antidote from a "mirror universe" where everything is opposite, and not being able to find anyone on Red Dwarf upon returning, a vending machine (voiced by Tony Slattery) informs Rimmer that everyone crossed back into the mirror universe. The machine opening the way to the mirror universe is shown to have been destroyed by the micro-organism, leaving Rimmer stranded and the only crew member aboard Red Dwarf in his universe.

==== 2000s ====
In Red Dwarf: Back to Earth (2009), set nine years later, Red Dwarf is intact; the human race is apparently "virtually extinct" in the universe apart from Lister again; Lister, Rimmer, the Cat and Kryten are the only people on board the ship; and Rimmer is shown to be a hard light hologram and the most senior officer on board again; how these have come about and what happened to the micro-organism is not explained. In this special, a female "despair squid", whose ink causes joy and elation instead of despair to defend herself, causes Lister, Rimmer, the Cat and Kryten to share a hallucination where they believe they are fictional characters from a TV series called Red Dwarf, and their dimension is "invalid". This leads them to be shown being pulled into the nearest "valid" reality. They confront the "Creator" of Red Dwarf (Richard O'Callaghan) on a version of 21st century Earth who is ready to kill off the characters, and Lister accidentally kills him. The four subconsciously realise that they're hallucinating, and they wake up on board Red Dwarf. Kryten and Rimmer speculate that they were able to choose whether or not they wanted to wake up because of the strengthened antibodies of the four from the previous encounter with the despair squid. Lister initially believes that Kochanski is dead as well, but two children in the hallucination (played by Charlie Kenyon and Nina Southworth) inform that Kryten lied to him, and she actually left him after taking a Blue Midget shuttle. Kryten later confirms this. After waking up, Lister subsequently starts looking for Kochanski to get her back.

==== 2010s ====
In "Trojan" (2012), Lister describes himself as the "last human being alive", with Kryten saying the same thing about him in "Dear Dave" (2012), while in a recorded message for his son (himself) in "Fathers and Suns" (2012), Lister tells himself to "find Krissie [Kochanski]" after getting himself an education, and in "Entangled" (2012), Lister mentions asking the Biologically Engineered Garbage Gobblers (BEGGs) for help with finding Kochanski.

According to backstory in "Twentica" (2016), Lister hotwired cars to go shoplifting from the age of seven until he was eleven, when he was on the straight and narrow. He also lies that he is a descendant of the scientist Joseph Lister to gain the crew access to the Lady Be Good Club.

In "Officer Rimmer" (2016), Lister reveals that as a kid he sold the rights to his genome to his friend Dodgy for 100 dollarpounds and half a packet of cigarettes. Kryten explains that this means thousands of companies, including a call centre, were licensed to produce biological copies of Lister. Lister wonders if this means all the "smartarse Scousers in call centres" are him.

In "Skipper" (2017), Rimmer uses a quantum skipper to travel to a universe where Lister is kind and hardworking. Here, Lister got put into stasis because he smuggled a pet rat on board, rather than a pet cat. The rat race did not have a religious war when they evolved, but stayed on Red Dwarf, living on most of its decks. In another universe, Rimmer discovers Lister has become captain of Red Dwarf subsequent to Lister spotting the faulty drive plate, and has become wealthy from the shares he owned after Red Dwarf discovered a planet rich in helium-7.

==== 2020s ====
In The Promised Land (2020), Lister finally meets the Felis sapiens after having had to flee Red Dwarf due to a rebooted Holly, void of memories of his previous incarnation, evicting the crew from the ship. The three Cat clerics they meet worship Lister (who they call Cloister) as their deity and are part of a dying religious sect, having fled persecution from Rodon, a brutal Cat warlord seeking to eradicate followers of Cloister to replace him as their race's new god. They all escape near death after being confronted by Rodon and his army, before crashlanding Starbug on a desert moon.

While marooned, Lister helps comfort Rimmer, troubled over his existence as a hologram, reassuring him that because of their relationship together, Rimmer does exist, in the same way a moon can produce moonlight from a sun. Communicating via Starbug, Lister further convinces the rebooted Holly to download the memory banks of the Holly they knew, tricking him into thinking the other Holly was of an even greater intelligence. This leads to Holly firing a missile at the moon that launches Starbug into space and back towards Red Dwarf. When they arrive, Rodon and his army are there to meet them, preparing to blow the ship up from the inside with the crew left onboard. Lister, using the mystical Anubis Stone retrieved by the Cat clerics, generates enough power towards Rimmer's light-bee to return him to his "Diamond Light" form and save the ship, before ultimately defeating Rodon. In the end, Lister convinces Rimmer to give up his superpowers provided by his "Diamond Light" form to resurrect a dead Kryten and make him operational again. The Felis sapiens, after having witnessed these events, stop worshipping Cloister, now adopting Rimmer as their new god.

=== Novels ===
Within the continuity of the books by Grant Naylor, Lister's official date of birth is 14 October. Lister is described as going on a drunken Monopoly board pub crawl in London with his friends to celebrate his 23rd birthday, where he gets very drunk; when he awakens, he is on Mimas with no money. After six months, having failed to make enough money to get back home, he signs up for a job on Red Dwarf, which, unknown to him, is due to make a four-and-a-half-year mining run to Triton before heading back to Earth. Smuggling a cat on board was in fact a deliberate attempt to get discharged and sent home early.

In the book Better Than Life (1990), after spending two years in the game Better Than Life, Lister eventually discovers Earth, but discovers that it has left the orbit of the Solar System and finds that eight-foot-long cockroaches are the dominant species. He becomes their king and plans to rebuild the planet. The others find him thirty-four years later (after believing Lister was missing for a fortnight due to a time dilation). Later, after Lister dies of a heart attack in a confrontation with a polymorph, his body is taken to the alternative universe where time runs backwards and is told that he will be rescued in thirty-six years' time. Two accounts of what followed are Last Human (1995) and Backwards (1996).

In Last Human, the crew fight an alternate version of Lister who was adopted by different parents, this Lister choosing the wealthy but psychotic Thorntons over the poorer but more emotionally stable parents which the normal Lister had. As a result, this Lister grew up to be a sociopath, often manipulating others with his efforts, claiming not to believe in even the concept of love, and perfectly willing to murder his shipmates in order to achieve his goals.

In Backwards, the crew try to meet up with Lister at a Souvenir shop at Niagara Falls on backwards Earth, where they discover that Lister will be involved in a murder. They see Lister being unarrested and embark on a backwards pursuit. They find that Kryten was the one who killed a hillbilly which had Lister sentenced to eight years in prison (all in reverse). They miss their flight window and must spend the next ten years on the reverse Earth. They eventually leave for their own universe.

== Appearance ==
Lister is normally dressed in a leather jacket and deerstalker hat, his boiler suits and his lengthy dreadlocks that he grows only from the back of his head.

Lister has a tattoo on his right buttock, dedicated to the love of his life: it is a heart with an arrow through it and underneath it has in dripping curry sauce, "I love Vindaloo". It was obtained while on planet leave on Ganymede with Petersen, who spiked his cocktail with four-star petrol. When Lister woke up the next day, he had enrolled as a novice monk in a Ganymedian monastery. He also has another tattoo claiming that he loves Petersen placed on his inner thigh, which stems from an unidentified incident where the two got so heavily drunk together that Lister had no idea what was happening to him.

== Personality ==
Lister is very lazy, and more importantly, unmotivated. He is a slob: his best shirt is one with only two curry stains on the front. He enjoys "bumming around", drinking large amounts of lager, and eating Indian food and listening to a band called Rastabilly Skank. He is a supporter of the London Jets zero-gravity football team, and speaks with a Liverpudlian (Scouse) accent.

He prides himself on being a good man, a man of moral courage. When confronted with an evil version of himself on a corrupted version of Red Dwarf in "Demons and Angels" (1992), Lister says of his evil counterpart, "But he kills; I'm not capable of that." Likewise, when he kills "the Creator" of the Red Dwarf TV series during his hallucination in Back to Earth (2009), his initial reaction is to state that he doesn't kill people and doesn't understand why he did it. In the episode "Waiting for God" (1988), he also showed an extreme amount of remorse when he hears that vast numbers of the Cat's race have been killed due to holy wars and one of their arks flying off and crashing into an asteroid due to declaring him their god. Lister's religious beliefs are unclear. In the episode "The Last Day" (1989), Kryten states that Lister is a pantheist, believing God to be in all things; however, in the later episode "Back to Reality" (1992) he is described as the "ultimate atheist". Lister has had a number of relationships with women, albeit not all successful (his lack of ambition being the main cause for not settling down).

Lister managed to learn the international language Esperanto from Rimmer's tapes, while Rimmer himself was unable to. In the episode "Thanks for the Memory" (1988), Arnold Rimmer described that, even though all its ingredients were wrong, a fried-egg chilli chutney sandwich somehow made a right and likened this fact to Lister's personality. He is capable of piloting a spaceship and has a knack for mechanical repairs, particularly amateur cybernetics. He also considers himself good at pool, saying that he was nicknamed "Dave Cinzano Bianco Lister" because once he was on a table you couldn't get rid of him. When the Inquisitor from the 1992 episode of the same name appeared on Red Dwarf to judge the crew, he declared that Lister's failure to put his brain to good use was evidence that he had not lived a worthwhile life.

Lister is also an avid junk collector who has purchased (among other things) a talking toilet, a talking toaster with artificial intelligence, and two robot goldfish, which he named Lennon and McCartney (the latter of which swims backwards and is prone to breaking down).

=== Guitar ===
Lister is very attached to his guitar. In Series I, Lister's guitar is firstly a silver acoustic Clarissa Roundback (Polverini, Italian Ovation copy, S1E5, 19:41). Then in "Marooned" (1989), his guitar is shown to be a black, electric guitar – according to Lister it is an "authentic Les Paul copy". In "Fathers and Suns" (2012), Lister describes his guitar as a Gibson Les Paul.

The guitar appears to be destroyed or lost in several episodes, while somehow being recovered: in "Emohawk: Polymorph II" (1993), the Cat breaks Lister's guitar. By "Tikka to Ride" (1997), he seems to have it intact again. While Lister is prison in the episode "Krytie TV" (1999), Petersen recovers the guitar from the wreck of Starbug offscreen, and has it sent it to Lister. Later, in "Fathers and Suns", as punishment from his father (himself) for not applying for a robotics course, Lister's guitar is flushed out of one of Red Dwarf's airlocks and is "half a light-year away". When Professor Edgington (Sydney Stevenson) sees Lister's guitar case in "Entangled" (2012), Lister mentions that he plays guitar.

== American pilot ==
In the unaired pilot for the American version of Red Dwarf, Lister was played by Craig Bierko.
