= Red Dwarf Remastered =

Red Dwarf Remastered was an attempt in 1997 to bring the first three series of the BBC's cult sci-fi sitcom Red Dwarf up to date. A collaborative effort between BBC Worldwide and Grant Naylor Productions, it was hoped that remastered versions of the episodes would prove more appealing to broadcasters in international territories. Only Series I-III were remastered, although the BBC had commissioned the remastering of Series IV and V as well. Doug Naylor decided to put the project on hold and wait for technology to catch up with their vision.

== Changes ==
The CG version of Red Dwarf, which is darker and longer than the original.

Some of the changes made for Red Dwarf Remastered included:

- Replacement title sequences for Series I, II and III. These retained the initial image of Lister painting the outside of Red Dwarf, but featured a new attempt to realise the original intention to pull out from a close-up of Lister to the entire ship in one uninterrupted shot. This was followed by a new fast-paced opening montage similar to those created for Series III-VIII.
- All-new computer-generated special effects of Red Dwarf flying through space. Whilst the original series simply featured Red Dwarf flying through unadorned starscapes, the Remastered version added backgrounds such as burning suns, icy moons and coloured nebulae. A model dust storm was recreated in CG, and in addition to the typically sedate movement Red Dwarf was shown, in appropriate scenes, racing through space.
- Additional post-production visual effects. Including a malfunction effect being laid onto the hologram Rimmer in "Queeg", Holly on the monitors, transitions and (in close-up) borders being altered or added. Most significantly the starscape outside the windows of the ship interiors was edited, where possible, to match the new special effects. Due to technical restrictions this was possible only when the camera was static.

The CG version of Blue Midget, which has arms and legs replacing the caterpillar tracks of the original.

- Most other model shots of crafts in space being likewise replaced with computer-generated special effects. For the craft Blue Midget, as with Red Dwarf itself, these modifications amounted to a complete redesign, and matched those that would appear in Series VIII. The new Red Dwarf was created as a 12' model, but due to space restrictions in the studio they were unable to use it. Minor changes to Starbug also reflected the ship's Series VII incarnation, with a smaller viewscreen and legs that would tilt backwards.
- Further computer-generated additions and replacements. Including an extended sequence of the polymorph travelling through the Red Dwarf air ventilation system, a 'time hole' journey to backwards Earth, and various shots of elevators in lift-shafts. Other minor CGI alterations include those laid over existing live-action scenes, such as a grey opening and closing 'hatch' being laid over what was, in the original scene, a flip-top bin.
- Additional bluescreen elements being applied to particular scenes, especially during the first episode "The End". These included skutters placed in the foreground of an early scene, and more attendees being added to the foreground of the McIntyre funeral scene.
- Replacement music and audio effects being applied to all scenes: the show in general was given a more detailed soundscape, a new stereo mix with fully remastered foreground and background effects. The audience laughter track was similarly remixed and adjusted. Changes were specific as well as general: Rimmer's mother was re-voiced by a different actress in "Polymorph", for example; Rimmer was heard to crash into objects after falling through the Cat in "The End" (despite his holographic status); and in the same episode the Cat was supplemented with a hissing noise as he made himself "look big".
- All videotape work being given a full colour grade, and filmised.
  A still from "Polymorph" showing the before and after picture regrading
- Cropping of the top and bottom of the original picture to leave a 14:9 "widescreen" picture. (Some versions only.)
- Occasional close-up scenes with Holly in Series I being re-filmed with actor Norman Lovett. New jokes with the character were also added to several episodes. Hattie Hayridge's performance in Series III remained the same as the original, however.
- Trimming of some scenes, such as the shortening of George McIntyre's speech in "The End", the removal of Cat's fantasy mermaid girlfriend and the "Black card/white card" discussions in the episode "Balance of Power". Performed partially for pace reasons, and sometimes due to dissatisfaction with the writing or performance quality.

== Reaction ==
The changes received a mixed response from existing fans. Design changes, in particular to the Red Dwarf ship itself, were generally disliked, and the shift from models to CGI was not seen as an improvement. There was an outcry at the changing of some dialogue, particularly with regards to the removal of certain popular sequences (such as the aforementioned "black card/white card" joke). Naylor, himself, stated that he was slightly disappointed with the results, as the technology required for the ambitious remastering wasn't available at the time.

Internationally, Red Dwarf Remastered was sold to Japan, South America and other countries with significant success — finding fresh audiences who were unaware of its remastered status. The availability of isolated audio tracks for language dubbing allowed the programme to reach more foreign-language broadcasters.

Most recent UK repeats and the DVD releases of the show have been of the original untreated versions, although appearances depend on a channel's individual archive — in early 2003, the remastered "Marooned" incongruously appeared during a repeat run of the series on UKTV Gold that otherwise consisted of the original versions; they have also popped up from time to time on UKTV G2, in addition to Virgin Media's On Demand service. As of 2009, Netflix had the original versions on their DVD-by-mail service having previously provided the remasters on the web-based streaming service; the remastered versions were inadvertently sold on iTunes until mid-2009, when they were "corrected" to the original versions.

Plans to remaster series IV-VI were abandoned due to negative fan and critical reception, although series VIII (produced in late 1998, a year after the completion of Red Dwarf: Remastered) retains the CGI model of the ship created for the remastered I-III. This was acknowledged in the show with dialogue about how the ship had changed shape to its original design before the Jupiter Mining Corporation made a number of cutbacks, thus retaining series continuity.

The 2009 Back to Earth specials featured new CGI Red Dwarf, which was much closer to the original non-remastered model. Later, in 2012, Series X finally made use of the original 12' remastered model, albeit cut down length-wise to more closely match the original design.

== Other remastering ==
For the release of the Series VII DVD, the first episode "Tikka to Ride" was remastered. This only consisted of replacing the original last-minute CGI effects from the original broadcast with up-to-date, 2005-standard CGI. The original version was also included on the DVD.

== DVD releases ==
=== Non-UK releases ===
Remastered episodes have found their way onto DVD in continental Europe as the official series releases. Localised releases in Poland, France, Belgium, the Netherlands and Luxembourg all contain the remastered episodes. The remastered episodes were also released in Japan in their shorter NHK broadcast edits featuring significant edits, different title and credit sequences and Japanese dubbing. The Japanese version of remastered pilot episode "The End" was included as a bonus feature on the English language DVD release of Series I.

The US Netflix streaming release (though not the discs) also used the remastered episodes for the first three seasons until the show was first removed from the service. When the series returned to Netflix, the original non-remastered versions were used (though with some music replacement). The series has since been removed from Netflix again. In 2017, the series was uploaded to BritBox, where Series I-III run in their original versions.

=== The Bodysnatcher Collection ===
The remastered episodes of Series I–III were made available on DVD in the UK on 12 November 2007 as part of The Bodysnatcher Collection with an identical release in Australia following on 7 May 2008. The box set includes all 18 episodes cropped to letterbox format but still presented in 4:3 as they were on the VHS release. The set also included documentaries concerning the remastering project and the making of the original Series I and II (as these were absent from the original DVD release of these series). A text track is also included, detailing all changes between original and remastered versions.

The special features include what has been called the "original assembly" of the first episode of Red Dwarf, plus a lost episode, known as "Bodysnatcher", for which this set is named, which has been created in the same style as "Identity Within" for the Series VII DVD. The release also features commentary and interview contributions from Rob Grant, co-creator of Red Dwarf, marking his first direct contribution to the DVD releases. This set was not released in the US, and it is now out-of-print in the UK and Australia.
