= The End (Red Dwarf) =

- Red Dwarf episode
- Lister is frozen in stasis, shielded from a radiation leak which kills the crew of the Red Dwarf ship.
- Episode no.: Series 1 Episode 1
- Directed by: Ed Bye
- Written by: Rob Grant; Doug Naylor
- Original air date: 15 February 1988

Guest appearances
- Mac McDonald as Captain Hollister; C P Grogan as Kristine Kochanski; Robert Bathurst as Todhunter; Mark Williams as Petersen; Paul Bradley as Chen; David Gillespie as Selby; Robert McCulley as George McIntyre

Episode chronology
← Previous —	Next → "Future Echoes"
- Red Dwarf I

"The End" is the first episode of science fiction sitcom Red Dwarf, which was first broadcast on the British television channel BBC2 on 15 February 1988. The episode introduces the main characters and sets up the story backbone of the series. On the mining ship Red Dwarf, Dave Lister is placed in stasis for refusing to give up the whereabouts of his forbidden pet cat. When he emerges from stasis, three million years later, he discovers that everybody has died from a radiation leak.

The episode was written by Rob Grant and Doug Naylor, directed by Ed Bye and starred Craig Charles, Chris Barrie, Danny John-Jules and Norman Lovett. The script was rejected by the BBC three times before it was given the go ahead three years later. An electricians' strike at the BBC prevented filming and production on the series halted, only going ahead after the dispute was resolved.

The broadcast episode differs greatly from the originally filmed version. Grant and Naylor felt that scenes from the episode did not work, so with a spare filming slot additional scenes were added and previous scenes filmed again. Gaining more than five million viewers on its first showing, the episode is considered one of the best from the first series by fans. It was later remastered, along with the rest of the first three series, in 1998.

== Plot ==
On the mining vessel Red Dwarf, Dave Lister (Craig Charles) and Arnold Rimmer (Chris Barrie) go about their daily routine of maintenance. Rimmer takes his maintenance duties very seriously, despite lacking respect from other crew members, while Lister is more eager to be lazy and drink with others, and hopes to return to Earth to start a farm on Fiji with the true love of his life, Kristine Kochanski (Clare Grogan). The following day, Rimmer prepares for his latest attempt at the engineering exam, hoping to get promoted, but finds that the notes and equations he wrote on his arms and legs have been blurred due to him sweating nervously, prompting him to hand in a voided examination paper to the examiner before fainting.

Meanwhile, Lister is brought before Captain Hollister (Mac McDonald) and accused of smuggling aboard a non-quarantined pet – a pregnant cat that Lister named Frankenstein and hopes to include in his future plans. Learning that Frankenstein would be put down for a biopsy, Lister refuses and is sentenced to 18 months of suspended animation in a stasis cell. When he is revived by Holly (Norman Lovett) – the ship's ever-increasingly senile computer – he is informed that the crew are all dead, after a faulty drive plate caused them to be subjected to a lethal dose of cadmium II radiation. Lister is horrified to learn that he could not be released until three million years later, when the radiation had dispersed.

Lister soon discovers that Rimmer was resurrected by Holly as a hologram, though with the inability to touch or feel anything, and learns that Rimmer was responsible for the accident. While they explore the ship, the pair come across a graceful-looking humanoid which Holly reveals to be an evolution of cats descended from Lister's pet. Holly reveals that Frankenstein managed to get into the ship's hold during the accident and was able to be safely sealed as a result. The pair manage to convince him that they are no threat, and Lister names him Cat (Danny John-Jules). Lister learns the Cat's kind created a religion around Lister, and revered him as "Cloister the Stupid", who would lead them to the "promised land", Fuchal. Lister points out what he means and promises to do so, prompting Holly to plot a course for Fiji. After Rimmer remarks that humankind will have evolved to the point that Lister will be like "the slime that first crawled out of the oceans", Lister declares "Look out, Earth – the slime's coming home!"

== Production ==
=== Writing ===
The episode was written in 1983 during a stay at a cottage in Wales belonging to Doug Naylor's father. Almost a mile up a mountain the writing duo team of Rob Grant and Doug Naylor spent day and night writing. Almost finished, the pair had a near fatal accident during nightfall when their car veered perilously near the edge of a cliff. The script was not finished as expected as they spent the next day rescuing the car.

Grant and Naylor wrote in 1992 that:

We wrote the script without a real cast in mind. At this stage we imagined a kind of English version of Christopher Lloyd (who was playing Reverend Jim in Taxi) as Lister and English Dan Aykroyd (as he was in Trading Places) as Rimmer.

Grant and Naylor passed the completed script to Paul Jackson, whom they had worked for on Three of a Kind and Carrot's Lib, and John Lloyd, whom they worked with on Spitting Image. They both came back saying that they loved it, with even talk of them doing a co-production for the series. However, the task of dealing with the production rested with Jackson who had trouble convincing the BBC who went on to reject the script three times. Grant and Naylor were keen to have the series done on the BBC as they felt the extra 3 minutes of non-commercial time would be invaluable. It would take another three years before the series was accepted by BBC North West.

=== Casting ===
When casting auditions started Norman Lovett was the first member of the cast selected, but had originally auditioned for Rimmer. Grant and Naylor thought otherwise and offered him the role of Holly, who at this stage was just a voice-over part. Danny John-Jules auditioned successfully for the Cat. Craig Charles was sent the script for his opinion as there were concerns over the Cat character coming across as racist. Charles was also being considered for the role. However it was later decided that Craig would be better suited auditioning for the role of Lister, who was initially described in the script as in his early forties. Chris Barrie later auditioned for both the Lister and Rimmer roles. A previous collaborator with Grant and Naylor, Chris had worked on their radio show Son of Cliché. Bigger named actors like Alan Rickman and Alfred Molina had also auditioned but were not considered because they would be unlikely to stay for a series run.

The character of the first hologram seen on screen, George McIntyre, was intended to be Australian to fit into the idea that the ship was international, but the actor, Robert McCulley had problems with the accent and decided to make the character Welsh instead. The episode featured a host of guest stars and extras, most uncredited. As well as featuring Mac McDonald as Captain Hollister and Clare Grogan (she changed her name to C. P. Grogan because of an Equity clash with another person with the same name) as Kristine Kochanski, Robert Bathurst appeared as Todhunter, Mark Williams as Petersen, Paul Bradley as Chen, and David Gillespie as Selby.

=== Filming ===
The episode, and the series, almost never happened due to an electricians strike at the BBC in 1987 which prevented filming and the project was shelved. Filming eventually went ahead after the industrial action was resolved. Filming a scene with the Frankenstein cat caused problems when it came to trying to get the right shot. The cat would not stay still long enough, would not look at the photo of Fiji, and kept scratching Craig Charles' leg and running away. Charles' genitals were also visible in some takes; Grant and Naylor later considered digitally editing them out, but went for an inferior take instead.

The opening theme tune was written by musician Howard Goodall. With its classical music style it parodied Stanley Kubrick's 2001: A Space Odyssey. Goodall also wrote the lyrics for the end credits theme tune, which was sung by Jenna Russell. The intention was to match the lyrics to Lister's desire to go to Fiji, especially regarding the "goldfish shoals nibbling at my toes" line.

For the opening credits and exterior shots a Red Dwarf model ship had to be built from scratch. Peter Wragg was the visual effects designer of Red Dwarf; Wragg also had a large part in set building and was the chief model maker. Wragg had previously filled a similar role in British television series such as Thunderbirds Are GO, Captain Scarlet and the Mysterons and Doctor Who. The opening effects shot features a dissolve from Lister painting the ship to a full model shot of the city-sized vessel traveling through space. Originally it was supposed to be one long take but it proved too difficult to mesh together with a small budget and lowly special effects of the day. The model of Red Dwarf itself measured about 8 feet (2.4 m) long from scoop to engine.

With a seventh episode slot left over at the end of production, Grant and Naylor decided to go back and re-shoot certain scenes and drop others that they felt did not work. Scenes removed include Lister ejecting the crew members' canisters into space and Rimmer conducting his own eulogy. One of the more drastic changes was the ship's computer, Holly. Initially shot as a voice over, Norman Lovett had convinced the creators to have a disembodied head on screen. The Holly scenes from the first three episodes were re-edited to feature the newly shot lines with the head of Holly. Altogether, approximately two-thirds of the broadcast episode was composed of reshoot footage.

Set designer Paul Montague gave the ship interiors a grey submarine look. Walls, floors, bunks, cans and even cigarette packets were coloured grey. The "Welcome Back George McIntyre" reception featured bright red plastic chairs, which had to be covered up with jackets to avoid harsh clashes of colour.

== Reception ==
The episode was originally broadcast on the British television channel BBC2 on 15 February 1988 in the 9:00 p.m. evening slot. The episode gained 5.1 million viewers from its first showing. The BBC had also received letters from viewers regarding the quality of the series as a whole. An audience Appreciation Index score of 80 out of 100 was also seen as a sign that the series had done well.

Co-creators/writers Grant and Naylor were so embarrassed by the first series that they had requested that the BBC not repeat the episodes as they felt that it would harm the following series. The video release of the first series was held back, making the first release of the series — featuring "The End" on tape one and "Confidence and Paranoia" on the second tape — hotly anticipated. Series I episodes performed poorly in a Red Dwarf Smegazine poll. This was perceived to be because fans hadn't seen, or had forgotten, the episodes — Series I not being repeated until 1994. However, the episode was considered the best from Series I.

== Remastering ==
The remastering of Series I to III was carried out during the late 1990s. Changes included replacement of the opening credits (re-instating the original idea of the one shot pulling away from the ship), the picture has been given a colour grade and filmised, new computer generated special effects of Red Dwarf flying through space, and visual, audio and scene adjustments.

Changes specific to "The End" include bluescreen elements added to the opening scene with skutters – small maintenance robots – placed in the foreground of Rimmer and Lister. Silhouettes of the crew's heads were added to the foreground of George McIntyre's funeral scene. Background noise was added to the soundtrack to give the impression that the ship was busy with a full crew on board. The George McIntyre funeral scene was trimmed down, with shots that did not work removed, and a new shot of the canister leaving the ship was inserted. Music and sound effects were added to Cat's entrance, with hissing noise added when he tries to frighten Lister and Rimmer.

== See also ==
- Infinity Welcomes Careful Drivers – the first Red Dwarf novel features an expanded version of events from this episode and builds on the backstory as well as featuring new stories not seen in televised episodes.
