= Red Dwarf II =

Series of television

- Starring: Chris Barrie; Craig Charles; Danny John-Jules; Norman Lovett
- No. of episodes: 6

Release
- Original network: BBC2
- Original release: 6 September – 11 October 1988

Series chronology
- ← Previous; Red Dwarf I Next → Red Dwarf III

Red Dwarf II is the second series of the British science fiction sitcom Red Dwarf. It consisted of six episodes and was broadcast on UK television channel BBC2 between 6 September and 11 October 1988.

The series follows the life of technician Dave Lister (Craig Charles), who is the only survivor of an accident on the spaceship Red Dwarf, and the last survivor of the human race, three million years in the future, and his shipmates, a holographic reproduction of his dead bunkmate and boss, Arnold Rimmer (Chris Barrie), a sapient Cat (Danny John-Jules) who is a result of three million years' evolution, and the ship's computer Holly (Norman Lovett).

== Production ==
Red Dwarf II was ordered while the first series was being aired. The first series had been shot entirely at New Broadcasting House, Manchester and show creators Rob Grant and Doug Naylor were keen to broaden out stories by doing some location shooting.

Locations used included a beach in Rhyl, standing in for a tropical paradise in "Better Than Life", a landfill site used for a moon in "Thanks for the Memory", and the Midland Hotel, Manchester playing the role of Ganymede Holiday Inn in "Stasis Leak".

A small shuttle ship, Blue Midget, was brought in to ferry the crew to and from different locations.

== Cast ==
The mechanoid Kryten appears in the first episode, "Kryten", played by David Ross. The writers had resisted using robot characters as they had considered the practice a sci-fi cliché. "Better Than Life", which is about a virtual reality simulation, features John Abineri as Rimmer's father, Gordon Salkilld as Gordon, another ship's computer, and regular warm-up man Tony Hawks as an in-game guide.

Some of the pre-accident supporting cast reappear in "Stasis Leak" — specifically Mac McDonald as Captain Hollister, C. P. Grogan as Kristine Kochanski and Mark Williams as Olaf Petersen.

The episode "Queeg" features Charles Augins as the eponymous Queeg, an alternate version of the ship's computer. Augins also provided choreography for the opening dance number "Tongue Tied", in "Parallel Universe".

"Parallel Universe" itself contains alternate versions of the main characters; the alternate Lister was played by Angela Bruce and the alternate Rimmer was played by Suzanne Bertish. The alternate version of Holly, Hilly, was played by Hattie Hayridge. Hayridge would take over the role of Holly in series III.

== Reception ==
Writing in 2015, Den of Geek ranked Red Dwarf II the third best of the then nine full seasons of the show, saying that "It's hard to dispute that its second run was an improvement upon its first. The writing is tighter, the actors are more settled in their roles, and the characters' dynamics have deepened", and highlighted "Better Than Life" and "Queeg" as highlights.

Sophie Davies, writing in 2017 for CultBox, noted the expansion of the range of characters and locations, and was "pleasantly surprised" at the gender politics in "Parallel Universe".

== Episodes ==
No. overall	No. in series	Title	Directed by	Written by	Original release date	Prod. code	Viewers (millions)
7	1	"Kryten"	Ed Bye	Rob Grant and Doug Naylor	6 September 1988	4	2.5
Red Dwarf intercepts an SOS distress call from the American Space cruiser Nova 5, which has crashed on an asteroid. Much to their disappointment, the crew (who are expecting to find female crew members) find the only survivor is Kryten (David Ross), a service mechanoid with an over-active guilt chip. Lister wants to teach Kryten to be rebellious, whilst Rimmer wants to abuse Kryten's servility.
8	2	"Better Than Life"	Ed Bye	Rob Grant and Doug Naylor	13 September 1988	1	2.45
A post pod carrying a three-million-year-old bag of mail arrives, containing a total-immersion computer game called "Better Than Life" which makes the player's wishes come true. The group swiftly begin to play it for their own enjoyment, until Rimmer's neurotic brain fittingly begins to rebel against the fantasy, unable to accept things going right for him, and turn it into a nightmare for all of them.
9	3	"Thanks for the Memory"	Ed Bye	Rob Grant and Doug Naylor	20 September 1988	2	3.1
The crew wake up after celebrating the anniversary of Rimmer's death, only to find four whole days have passed that they have no memories of, including Holly. Seeking answers, the group soon learn that the ship's black box was buried on a remote moon. Recovering it to access missing CCTV footage, they slowly learn why it was buried when they find out what they did in the missing four days.
10	4	"Stasis Leak"	Ed Bye	Rob Grant and Doug Naylor	27 September 1988	3	3.15
A time portal called a "Stasis Leak" is found on Floor 16 and it takes the crew back in time on Red Dwarf three million years earlier, to a point three weeks before the disaster which killed the rest of the crew. Rimmer tries to change the past by putting himself into suspended animation, so he does not die in the radioactive disaster. Lister has similar plans for Kochanski.
11	5	"Queeg"	Ed Bye	Rob Grant and Doug Naylor	4 October 1988	6	2.3
When Holly allows a meteorite to damage the ship and cause Rimmer's hologram to malfunction, the crew lose faith in him. Red Dwarf's back-up computer, Queeg 500 (Charles Augins), soon takes command and runs the ship like a military garrison, much to the crew's dislike. Despite their misgivings, Holly agrees to challenge Queeg to a contest, in which the loser gets erased from the system.
12	6	"Parallel Universe"	Ed Bye	Rob Grant and Doug Naylor	11 October 1988	5	2.9
The crew test Holly's new invention, the "Holly Hop Drive", only to find Red Dwarf entering an alternate parallel dimension consisting of female versions of themselves. Cat, however, finds his parallel counterpart is a male being called Dog. While killing time until Holly's invention can take them home, Lister makes the unwise decision to sleep with his counterpart, not knowing what it will mean for him.

== Home media release ==
The series was released in March 1992 on VHS, and on DVD in 2003. A remastered edition, with revised visual effects and other changes, was released on VHS in 1998.
