= Tongue Tied (Red Dwarf song) =

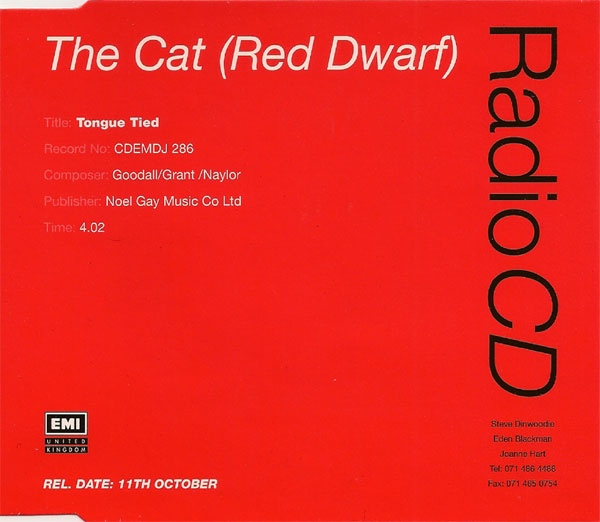

Single by The Cat
- Released: 11 October 1993
- Label: EMI
- Songwriter: Howard Goodall / Doug Naylor / Rob Grant

"Tongue Tied" is a song by Danny John-Jules (credited as "The Cat") featured in the 1988 Red Dwarf episode "Parallel Universe" and released as a single in 1993.

== Original version (1983) ==
"Tongue Tied" had its origins in the BBC Radio 4 comedy series Son of Cliché in 1983. Rob Grant and Doug Naylor wrote the lyrics for the comedic love song, in which the words of the chorus are delivered in an increasingly-unintelligible manner by the lovestruck singer. Peter Brewis composed the music for "Tongue Tied" and the song's vocals were provided by Nick Wilton. The song was included in the first season of Son of Cliché, featuring in an episode broadcast on 11 October 1983.

== Red Dwarf version (1988) ==
In 1988, "Tongue Tied" was retooled for use in Grant and Naylor's science fiction sitcom Red Dwarf. Grant and Naylor extensively rewrote the lyrics and new music was provided by series composer Howard Goodall. In the documentary feature Settling the Score included in the Red Dwarf VI DVD (2005), Goodall claimed the Diana Ross song "Chain Reaction" was an influence on his music for "Tongue Tied."

"Tongue Tied" was staged and recorded on 9-10 July 1988 as an upbeat-pop song-and-dance number for "Parallel Universe", broadcast on 11 October 1988 as the final episode of the second season of Red Dwarf. The number was choreographed by Charles Augins, who had an onscreen role in the Red Dwarf episode "Queeg", and sung by Danny John-Jules in character as the Cat. Although "Parallel Universe" was the sixth and final episode of the season; it was the fifth episode largely shot; however, the "Tongue Tied" number was filmed after the recording of "Queeg." ("Parallel Universe" sans "Tongue Tied" was recorded on 25-26 June 1988; "Queeg" was recorded on 2-3 July 1988; and "Tongue Tied" was recorded on 9-10 July 1988.)

"Parallel Universe" begins with the Cat using a dream recorder, attempting to find a specific dream. He views a dream in which he sings "Tongue Tied" with Lister (Craig Charles) and Rimmer (Chris Barrie), with dancers in the background. The version of the song included in the episode is a trimmed-down edit of the entire performance. An instrumental version of "Tongue Tied" appears during the disco scene in the middle of the episode.

Instrumental versions can also be heard elsewhere in the second season of Red Dwarf (in the Ganymede Holiday Inn in "Stasis Leak" and in the restaurant in "Better Than Life").

== Danny John-Jules version (1993) ==
Danny John-Jules later re-recorded an R&B version of "Tongue Tied" as a single release by "The Cat" in 1993. The song was recorded in Portobello Road, Notting Hill and accompanied by a music video featuring John-Jules in character as the Cat and Duane Dibbley, backed by fellow Red Dwarf cast members Chris Barrie, Craig Charles, Robert Llewellyn, Norman Lovett, and Hattie Hayridge, as well as Charles Augins and Elvis impersonator Clayton Mark (who guest-starred in the 1991 Red Dwarf episode "Meltdown"). Vanessa Morris, a model and friend of John-Jules, appears in the video as "Kit," a female equivalent of the Cat and the object of the Cat's affections. (In "Parallel Universe," the song in which "Tongue Tied" had appeared before, the Cat bemoaned not having a "female opposite" as Rimmer and Lister have.) The "Tongue Tied" music video was directed by Danny John-Jules under the alias "A1 DJJ."

The "Tongue Tied" single was released on 11 October 1993 (ten years to the day after the original version of the song premiered in Son of Cliché), coinciding roughly with the launch of the sixth season of Red Dwarf on television. The song entered the UK singles chart at number 18 and peaked at number 17. John-Jules was unable to promote the song in Top of the Pops due to commitments in a London play.

The VHS release Tongue Tied: The Video contained a 30-minute short film. The first 20 minutes comprises a longform version of the "Tongue Tied" music video, with a framing device starring Danny John-Jules as Leo Davis, a cleaner in a film studio. The video gives speaking roles to Vanessa Morris' Kit and Clayton Mark's Elvis, as well as walk-on appearances by the comic book character Judge Dredd and his namesake, English reggae and ska musician Judge Dread. John-Jules also plays a ragga singer, Tabby Ranks (a parody of Shabba Ranks), who performs an alternate mix of "Tongue Tied." The final 10 minutes of the short film is a behind-the-scenes featurette which includes footage of the music video shoot and John-Jules being interviewed by author/journalist Jane Killick.

== Home media ==
The full version of the 1988 Red Dwarf version of "Tongue Tied" is included as an extra feature in the Red Dwarf II DVD (2003). The original 1983 Peter Brewis version of "Tongue Tied" (with Nick Wilton's vocals) and the 1988 demo version (with music and vocals by Howard Goodall) are included as extra features in the DVD set Red Dwarf: The Bodysnatcher Collection (2007); clearance issues prevented the inclusion of Danny John-Jules' 1993 version of the song (which was not an official Grant Naylor/BBC-sanctioned release).
