= Bodyswap (Red Dwarf) =

- Red Dwarf episode
- Episode no.: Series 3 Episode 4
- Directed by: Ed Bye
- Written by: Rob Grant; Doug Naylor
- Original air date: 5 December 1989

Guest appearance
- Lia Williams as Carol Brown (Voice)

Episode chronology
← Previous "Polymorph"	Next → "Timeslides"
- Red Dwarf III

"Bodyswap" is the fourth episode of the third series of the British science fiction sitcom Red Dwarf and the sixteenth overall. It premiered on the British television channel BBC2 on 5 December 1989.

It was written by Rob Grant and Doug Naylor and directed by Ed Bye and was the first episode to be recorded without a live studio audience. The plot has Rimmer suggesting that the perfect way to help Lister get "healthy" is swapping bodies. The episode was remastered, along with the rest of the first three series, in 1998.

== Plot ==
A malfunctioning skutter runs amok and rewires Red Dwarf's circuitry. Despite Arnold Rimmer (Chris Barrie) warnings, Dave Lister (Craig Charles) makes an order at a snack machine and inadvertently triggers the ship's self-destruct mechanism. As the self-destruct can only be overridden by a senior officer, all of whom are dead, Kryten (Robert Llewellyn) performs a mind swap on Lister, temporarily placing the mind of a female officer of suitable rank who can override the self-destruct in Lister's body. The abort command is still refused but the end of the countdown is marked by the machine finally vending Lister's order. Ship's computer Holly (Hattie Hayridge) admits to having removed the bomb years ago.

The mind swap experiment gives Rimmer, who as a hologram cannot touch or feel anything, an idea. He convinces Lister to swap bodies with him for two weeks, offering to get his body back into shape. Lister soon regrets the decision when Rimmer instead overindulges himself in the pleasures he had been denied for so long. Although Lister recovers his body, Rimmer coerces Kryten to chloroform him so he can reacquire it. Angered by what he did, Lister, along with Cat (Danny John-Jules) and Kryten, pursue Rimmer when he absconds in a Starbug. The chase causes Rimmer to crash, and he is forced to return Lister his body. Some time later, Lister notices Rimmer acting strangely when he enters their quarters, and discovers that he has this time made Kryten swap his body with Cat, and promises to give the body back "first thing tomorrow. Maybe Thursday."

== Production ==
This was the first episode to be recorded without the live studio audience. Technical difficulties of the actors playing other characters meant that the scenes would have to have been done twice. Instead the voices were dubbed over the scenes in post-production and trying to match up with lip movements caused much mirth while recording. Chris Barrie, being an impressionist, had no problems playing Lister, whereas Craig's portrayal as Rimmer was not as smooth. The final edit, with dubbed voices, was then played to a small audience to provide the laughter track.

The long chase sequence with Blue Midget and Starbug was overseen by effects supervisor Peter Wragg. Using his experience of working on shows such as Thunderbirds, he had the model ships of Starbug and Blue Midget flying on hidden wires over a scaled landscape, Starbug eventually crashing into it.

This episode has the only mention of the ship White Midget. This was a mistake on the part of the writers. In the Remastered version, Lister's voice is dubbed over so he says "The Midget" instead of "White Midget". Originally the new smaller ship that would be used was White Midget, a similar version of the Blue Midget, but then Starbug was created, which would be bigger and allow for more room to film inside.

The large interior areas of Red Dwarf were filmed inside Padiham Power Station.

== Reception ==
The episode was originally broadcast on the British television channel BBC2 on 5 December 1989.

Writing in 2017, Sophie Davies of CultBox said that episode, like the first episode of the series "Backwards", the episode "has a rather gimmicky premise that's reliant on a special effect." She continued "The dubbing makes the dialogue feel a little stilted and the episode does less to develop the characters than you would expect."

== Remastering ==
Changes made to "Bodyswap" include the Starbug and Blue Midget chase scenes have been replaced with a CGI sequence. The scene with Rimmer, as Cat, playing around with food has been added to the ending.

== See also ==
- Body swap, for numerous other fictional examples of the concept
