= Kryten (disambiguation) =

Kryten is a fictional character in the television series Red Dwarf.

Kryten may also refer to:

- Kryten (Red Dwarf episode), an episode from Red Dwarf, series two
