= Polymorph (Red Dwarf) =

- Red Dwarf episode
- The crew are hunted down by a shape-changing genetic mutant
- Episode no.: Series 3 Episode 3
- Directed by: Ed Bye
- Written by: Rob Grant; Doug Naylor
- Original air date: 28 November 1989

Guest appearances
- Frances Barber as Genny; Simon Gaffney as Young Rimmer; Kalli Greenwood as Mrs Rimmer

Episode chronology
← Previous "Marooned"	Next → "Bodyswap"
- Red Dwarf III

"Polymorph" is the third episode of science fiction sitcom Red Dwarf Series III, and the fifteenth in the show overall and was written by Rob Grant and Doug Naylor, and directed by Ed Bye.

It premiered on the British television channel BBC2 on 28 November 1989. It is considered by some to be the series' best.

The episode has the crew fighting a shapeshifting, emotion-stealing creature. It is the only Red Dwarf episode to feature a pre-credits warning about the content. The episode was remastered, along with the rest of the first three series, in 1998.

== Plot ==
A non-human life-form with shape-changing properties escapes from a waste pod floating in space and gets aboard Red Dwarf. Although Holly (Hattie Hayridge) detects it, despite scepticism by Arnold Rimmer (Chris Barrie) that it's a false alarm, the creature attacks Dave Lister (Craig Charles) while he is having dinner. As Rimmer and Cat (Danny John-Jules) wait for him to recover in the Medical Unit, Kryten (Robert Llewellyn) and Holly reveal the creature to be a man-made genetic mutant called a "Polymorph", designed to leech off its target's negative emotions, revealing that when Lister suffered immense fear when the creature attacked, it drained him of it and has now left him all too eager to face any danger.

To avoid it, the others seal Lister away and prepare to escape with a Starbug for a getaway. However, the Polymorph manages to capture each on their own, after an accident with heat-seeking bazookoids, and tricks them into each exposing a negative emotion – Cat loses his vanity; Kryten loses his guilt; and Rimmer loses his anger. All four find themselves at a disadvantage against the creature as a result, but opt to confront it down in the ship's cargo decks. Although things don't start well, they defeat it by pure luck thanks to their earlier accident, causing them to recover their lost emotions. As the group leave the cargo decks, they are unaware of a second Polymorph having boarded the ship from the same waste pod floating past Red Dwarf, which follows them, mimicking Lister's appearance.

=== Remastered ending ===
When the episode was remastered, Doug Naylor opted to change the ending of the story – in the remastered version, the second Polymorph makes its appearance as a bouncing ball, whereupon a caption explains that it was less intelligent than the first, stowed away in Lister's clean underpants drawer, and died of old age many years later. Naylor stated the change of ending was due to his dislike of fans asking him about the second creature's fate in the original ending.

== Production ==
A Manchester warehouse was used for the cargo bay scenes.

Director Ed Bye drew inspiration for the look and design of the episode from watching the 1979 film Alien just before shooting began. For the cargo bay scenes a warehouse in Manchester was hired for the shooting. Empty cardboard boxes were strategically stacked up and down the warehouse floor to give the illusion of a stocked cargo bay.

Although the episode had a pre-credits warning, about the episode's content, this was more of a plot device as the episode was broadcast past the 9:00 pm watershed. During the filming of the Polymorph morphing into Lister's boxer shorts scene the audience laughed so loud for so long that Chris Barrie had to wait several minutes until things had calmed down (the scene is now considered by many to be one of the funniest of the entire series). This also provided extra work in the editing room as the sequence required more work than usual to edit together a workable shot.

The episode also had some of the show's most effects intensive scenes done yet. Animatronic versions of both the small and large Polymorph creature versions were created. The small version was voiced by production manager Mike Agnew. The larger model, which was prone to tipping over, collapsed before the final shot. Blue screen was used to shoot the creature and added to existing footage of the crew. To achieve the Polymorph morphing into all the different objects the traditional locked-off camera and jump-cut procedure was used. The newly introduced Bazookoids provided more video effects as two heat-seeking laser bolts were fired and ended up chasing the Cat. The heat-seekers were given sound effects borrowed from the lightsabers of Star Wars.

Guest appearances included actress Frances Barber who took on a scene as 'Genny Mutant', Kalli Greenwood, who played Rimmer's mother, and the show's first appearance of Rimmer as a young boy, played by Simon Gaffney.

Grant and Naylor's script for the episode was collected in the 1993 book Primordial Soup.

== Cultural references ==
The scene where the polymorph shapeshifts into Lister's boxer shorts has a literary parallel in Damon Knight's 1964 short story "Maid to Measure" where a jealous and witchy lady literally changes into a bikini for the use of the woman who's her deadly rival.

== Reception ==
The episode was originally broadcast on the British television channel BBC2 on 21 November 1989, and was well received by fans, many considering it to be the series' best. It came second in a Red Dwarf Smegazine readers poll, gaining 9.3% of the votes.

On the Series III DVD the producers mention "Polymorph" as one of their favorite episodes from the series.

A 2004 review for DVD Talk described it as "a great episode because the actors really have fun with their newly transformed attitudes." Writing in 2017 for CultBox, Sophie Davies said it is "one of Red Dwarf III's most memorable episodes" and also highlights the changed personas as a "standout".

== Remastering ==
Changes to "Polymorph" include:

- The original pre-opening credits warning for viewer discretion on the following episode has been removed.
- A scene near the beginning with The Cat being disgusted by Lister's choice of cutlery was removed
- The polymorph entering Red Dwarf CGI duct systems has been added.
- Lister wrestling with the dummy snake has been re-worked and tightened.
- Kryten's lines have been re-dubbed to remove the English accent from a cargo bay scene.
- Mrs Rimmer's voice has been re-dubbed with a new actress to fit in more with the character.
- The end sequence of the second Lister following the crew has been replaced with an epilogue shot, which explains that the second polymorph hid in Lister's clean underpants drawer and died of old age.

== See also ==
- Better Than Life novel which uses, and expands on the Polymorph premise.
- "Emohawk: Polymorph II", an episode from Series VI which is a pseudo-sequel.
