= Timeslides =

- Red Dwarf episode
- Episode no.: Series 3 Episode 5
- Directed by: Ed Bye
- Written by: Rob Grant; Doug Naylor
- Original air date: 12 December 1989

Guest appearances
- Simon Gaffney as Young Rimmer; Robert Addie as Gilbert; Rupert Bates as Bodyguard; Richard Hainsworth as Bodyguard; Emile Charles as Young Lister; Carcass as Smeg and the Heads; Stephen McKintosh as Thicky Holden; Louisa Ruthven as Ski Woman; Koo Stark as Lady Sabrina Mulholland-Jjones; Mark Steel as Ski Man; Ruby Wax as Blaize Falconburger; Adolf Hitler as himself

Episode chronology
← Previous "Bodyswap"	Next → "The Last Day"
- Red Dwarf III

"Timeslides" is the fifth episode of the third series of the British science fiction sitcom Red Dwarf, and the seventeenth in the show overall.

It premiered on the British television channel BBC2 on 12 December 1989. Written by Rob Grant and Doug Naylor, and directed by Ed Bye, the plot deals with Lister's desire to change his life by going back in time and changing his past. The episode was re-mastered, along with the rest of the first three series, in 1998.

== Plot ==
Dave Lister (Craig Charles) confides with Cat (Danny John-Jules) and Arnold Rimmer (Chris Barrie) that he has become bored with their various games, and has begun to hate his life on Red Dwarf. The group are interrupted and called to the ship's Darkroom when Kryten (Robert Llewellyn) discovers that the developing fluid has mutated, causing any photo it develops to come to life. Utilising slides to demonstrate the effect, Lister accidentally trips into a slide of a wedding photo, and discovers they can interact with the contents but cannot move beyond the borders of the original photo, learning that they can use this to travel in time when Lister interacts with one of Rimmer's old photos of Adolf Hitler. Lister quickly decides to use this method of time travel to change his life and make his younger self the inventor of "tension sheets", a product that one of Rimmer's former schoolmates invented that led them to becoming wealthy.

The group travel back to when Lister was 17 and fronting a band called "Smeg and the Heads". Lister convinces his teenaged self (Emile Charles) to take the tension sheet he brought with him down to the patent office and register it as his own invention. Upon returning to the present, Rimmer finds that history has been changed – while he and Holly (Hattie Hayridge) are the only occupants on Red Dwarf, Lister grew up to be a success story, while Cat and his race never came to exist, and Kryten was never rescued. Rimmer opts to learn how successful Lister became, and using his new background from Holly's database, travels into the past to discover that he became wealthy, living a luxurious life in a mansion with a supermodel. Annoyed by Lister's success, Rimmer decides to change the past by trying to convince his younger self to invent the tension sheet, but instead returns time to the way it was. However, Holly notes that his actions had the side effect of making him human again, which he enjoys for a brief moment before he accidentally blows himself up with explosive crates.

== Production ==
Due to a continuity error, certain lines had to be cut from the skiing holiday picture scene. The scene established that Lister had got somebody's skiing holiday pictures back by mistake. The skiers were scripted to discuss how they received Lister's rather scary birthday snaps in place of theirs. Craig Charles realised that this was a continuity flaw as at that time, the skiers would not have received them yet. The lines were cut, but as they were originally speaking parts, the actors present were still credited for their parts.

The episode featured music from Charles. Not only did he write "Bad News" and "Cash" but he penned the song "Om" which was sung by the young Lister, who was played by Emile Charles, Craig's brother. Young Lister was lead singer in the band 'Smeg and the Heads' alongside Gazza and Dobbin, portrayed by Jeffrey Walker and Bill Steer of real-life band Carcass respectively.

Simon Gaffney played the Young Rimmer. Robert Addie played Gilbert, Lister's servant. Rupert Bates and Richard Hainsworth each played as one of Lister's bodyguards. Stephen McKintosh played Thickie Holden, Rimmer's roommate and inventor of the Tension Sheet. Louisa Ruthven appeared as Ski Woman and Mark Steel appeared as Ski Man in one of the Timeslide photos, Koo Stark played Lady Sabrina Mulholland-Jjones, Lister's "most desirable woman in the Western Hemisphere" fiancée. Ruby Wax, director Ed Bye's wife, played Blaize Falconberger, the host of the fictional television series Lifestyles of the Disgustingly Rich and Famous. Wax was a late addition to the cast as the original actor chosen to play Blaize, Graham Chapman of Monty Python fame, died shortly before rehearsals began. Chris Barrie also appears in one slide as Rimmer's brother Frank, in a picture of Frank's wedding which Lister manages to accidentally gatecrash, leading an annoyed Frank to repeatedly punch Lister in the stomach. Barrie's portrayal of Frank is similar to Barrie's later portrayal of Ace Rimmer, the more successful, brave and popular version of Rimmer from a parallel dimension. This is most evident in Ace's accent as his voice is a more mid-atlantic version of the voice Barrie used to play Frank.

== Cultural references ==
One of the Timeslide photos shows Adolf Hitler, leader of the "runners-up" in World War II, in Nuremberg. Lister comes back from the Timeslide with a suitcase from Colonel Claus von Stauffenberg, who was a key member in the assassination attempt on Hitler. Lister suggests that they could go back and convince Dustin Hoffman not to make Ishtar.

With the timelines changed, Lister is now famous and rich, as shown in a news reel. He bought Buckingham Palace and "...had it ground down just to line his drive". He called his home "Xanadu", not as a reference to the movie Citizen Kane, but rather as a tribute to the hit single by Dave Dee, Dozy, Beaky, Mick & Tich. The wealthy Lister is profiled in a fictional television series, as a spoof of Lifestyles of the Rich and Famous.

Lister's teenage self continually accuses him of being a crypto-fascist.

The alternate Lister's mansion and the courtyard with the non-urinating statue is a Grade I listed mansion house within Lyme Park. The building can also be seen in the background of the spoof series presented by Ruby Wax. The mansion dining room scene was filmed in the dining room of Tatton Hall.

== Broadcast ==
The episode was originally broadcast on the British television channel BBC2 on 12 December 1989.

== Remastering ==
During remastering the following changes were made to the episode. The special guest star Adolf Hitler has been removed from the opening credits. Lister kicking the bomb into the timeslide has been tightened and a fire element added to explosion. Lister's reference to the Dustin Hoffman movie Ishtar has been removed, as have references to Xanadu and Citizen Kane. A running water video effect has been added to enrich Lister's huge statue.
