= Marooned (Red Dwarf) =

- Red Dwarf episode
- Episode no.: Series 3 Episode 2
- Directed by: Ed Bye
- Written by: Rob Grant; Doug Naylor
- Original air date: 21 November 1989

Episode chronology
← Previous "Backwards"	Next → "Polymorph"
- Red Dwarf III

"Marooned" is the second episode of the third series of the British science fiction sitcom Red Dwarf and the fourteenth in the show overall.

It premiered on the British television channel BBC2 on 21 November 1989 and was written by Rob Grant and Doug Naylor, and directed by Ed Bye, the story is a two-hander about Lister and Rimmer surviving together on a bleak ice planet.

The episode was remastered, along with the rest of the first three series, in 1998.

== Plot ==
Holly (Hattie Hayridge) discovers that Red Dwarf is on a collision course with five black holes and recommends that everyone abandon ship with what they need. While Kryten (Robert Llewellyn) and Cat (Danny John-Jules) take a Blue Midget to escape, Dave Lister (Craig Charles) and Arnold Rimmer (Chris Barrie) make their getaway in a Starbug. As Lister is made to listen to Rimmer's regaling of his military interests, including how he found out that in a previous incarnation, he was Alexander the Great's chief eunuch, their ship is struck by a meteor and crash lands on an icy planet. Lister is forced to do his best to survive until the pair can be found, making do with what food and supplies he has aboard Starbug, and talking with Rimmer, whose existence as a hologram means his life is not in danger. Rimmer does his best to help distract Lister from hunger by having them exchange stories of how they lost their virginity and learns about a side of Lister he never knew about.

To keep warm during their stories, Lister burns Rimmer's collection of books and a sizeable amount of money he saved up in life. When the fire burns low, Lister suggests using either Rimmer's collection of 19th century war figures or his camphor wood chest. Rimmer refuses to let them be used and recommends that Lister's guitar be burned instead. Lister reluctantly agrees and asks for a moment alone, whereupon he secretly cuts out a silhouette of his guitar from the trunk, burns it, and hides his guitar in a locker. When Rimmer returns, he commends Lister for his assumed sacrifice, noting how much their personal belongings each mean to them. After telling Lister that the chest was the only thing that his father ever gave him, Rimmer insists on burning the figures to return the favour. Shortly afterwards, Kryten and Cat arrive, having searched for the pair for the past two days, revealing that Holly mistook grit on the ship's scanner scope for black holes. As the group prepare to leave, Rimmer discovers Lister's deceit when he recovers his guitar, and advises Kryten to grab a hacksaw as he prepares to "do to Lister what Alexander the Great once did to him".

== Production ==
The Starbug crash sequence was achieved by using a miniature ice planet and filmed on 35mm film stock in order to slow the footage down. The flaming meteorite was dropped from above onto the upward facing Starbug and filmed sideways on. This gave the impression of forward motion and gave the meteorite's flames the desired flicker of zero gravity. For the icy wastelands scenes with Kryten and Cat bluescreen was used, but a more realistic snowscape scene was created for Lister's blowing about scene. Soap powder was blown down the set by powerful fans.

Scenes that were cut included the crew playing strip poker at the beginning (as seen in the Smeg Outs video released later) and the Cat's "Mush Mush!" which was trimmed down from its larger initial state. Despite popular rumours, the dog food eaten by Craig Charles in this episode was actually tuna mixed with meat jelly to look like dog food. The episode was originally titled "Men of Honour", referring to the theme of the story of the sacrifices Rimmer and Lister had to make. The title was later changed to the shorter "Marooned".

Grant and Naylor's script for the episode was collected in the 1993 book Primordial Soup.

== Cultural references ==
Among Rimmer's possessions in his camphor wood trunk are his 19th century replicas of Napoleon's L'Armée du Nord. Rimmer references Lieutenant-General Baron Jaquinaux of the First Cavalry Division when Lister picks the replica up. Lister comments that Rimmer is obsessed with war, with half his books being about Patton, Caesar and "various other gits". Lister references Road Runner in describing Rimmer's cowardly act in fleeing a bar room brawl. Rimmer references Newcastle Brown bottles when stating that generals do not resort to violence. Rimmer said to Lister that he had visited Alexander the Great's palace in Macedonia.

Among the few edible items found aboard Starbug are a Pot Noodle, half a bag of soggy smoky bacon crisps, a tin of mustard powder, three water biscuits, a brown lemon, two bottles of vinegar, and a tube of Bonjela gum ointment. As Lister looks through Rimmer's books they all remind him of food; Charles Lamb, Herman Wouk (whose last name Lister pronounced as "Wok"), the complete works of Sir Francis Bacon, Eric Van Lustbader (arguing that food comes in vans) and Harold Pinter (Pint-er). As an alternative to the "Mayday" distress call, which he mistakenly believes is named for a bank holiday, Rimmer comes up with "Shrove Tuesday", "Ascension Sunday" and "The fifteenth Wednesday after Pentecost". In a continuity error in that scene, Rimmer is shown operating Starbug's distress call system, when as a hologram he should not be able to interact with the ship's controls. In another error it is not explained how Rimmer is able to smell burning camphor wood, despite being a hologram. It is also something to wonder why there would be a can of dog food on board Starbug when Red Dwarf would not allow pets, as well as the food still being in good condition after three million years. Lister references the Ryder Cup while Rimmer compares Lister's bottom to "two badly parked Volkswagens".

To keep warm Lister starts burning some of Rimmer's books including Biggles Learns to Fly and the Complete Works of Shakespeare. Rimmer name checks Shakespeare's work as Lister gets ready to burn it: "Goodbye Hamlet? Farewell Macbeth? Toodle-pip King Lear." He states that he has seen West Side Story which is based on one of them and loathes the idea of burning Richard III with its "unforgettable" speech that starts with "Now..." (presumably referencing the "Now is the winter of our discontent" speech), although he cannot remember anything beyond that first word. Lolita is also burned on the fire, minus one particularly racy page. The song Lister plays on his guitar is "She's Out of My Life" by Michael Jackson.

== Reception ==
The episode was originally broadcast on the British television channel BBC2 on 21 November 1989.

The episode came 15th out of the 30 then-existing episodes in a Red Dwarf Magazine readers poll in 1992, gaining 2.4% of the votes.

Chris Barrie has said that the episode is one of his all-time favourites.

In a 2004 review, DVD Talk stated that "the dialogue is witty and hilarious", and said that "there are tons of memorable lines and scenes from this episode, and is consequently a fan favorite as well."

Writing in 2017 for CultBox, Sophie Davies said that the episode " 'Marooned' harks back to the first two series" in focusing on the Lister-Rimmer dynamic, continuing that "It's an extremely well-written, character-driven episode, which in my opinion is the best of this series and one of the best of Red Dwarf altogether."

Unlike other Red Dwarf episodes up to 1993, "Marooned" was rated 15 by the British Board of Film Classification (BBFC) upon its original VHS release, rather than the broader PG rating given to other episodes. This was due to the scene in which Lister recounts losing his virginity at the age of twelve. As it shared a VHS release with the next episode, "Polymorph", some erroneously assumed that the 15 rating applied to that episode instead, due to its use of squeamish imagery and the word "twat". "Marooned" was resubmitted to the BBFC in remastered form in 1998 and extended form in 2003, and on both occasions the certificate was lowered to 12, a rating that was only introduced to video in 1994.

== Remastering ==
In "Marooned", in the early shuttle bay scenes, a blue-screen image has been added to Starbug's cockpit window. Shots of Blue Midget and Starbug departing Red Dwarf have been replaced with CGI versions. References to Cliff Richard and the ozone layer have been removed.

Upon its release on VHS the new re-mastered episodes were generally received poorly by fans of the show, although it has been stated by critics that they are "actually an invigorating new take on a classic series". The re-mastered series was later released, along with other material, on The Bodysnatcher DVD boxset, in 2007. For a time, British TV channels UKTV Gold and Dave aired the remastered version of "Marooned" exclusively, even though other episodes of the show were not shown in their remastered form. This was corrected in 2015 following years of coverage by Red Dwarf fansite Ganymede & Titan, culminating in an open letter to Dave.

== See also ==
- Better Than Life: The second Red Dwarf novel, which uses some of the plot from "Marooned" for part of the story.
