= The Last Day (Red Dwarf) =

- Red Dwarf episode
- Episode no.: Series 3 Episode 6
- Directed by: Ed Bye
- Written by: Rob Grant; Doug Naylor
- Original air date: 19 December 1989

Guest appearances
- Julie Higginson as Girl Android; Gordon Kennedy as Hudzen

Episode chronology
← Previous "Timeslides"	Next → "Camille"
- Red Dwarf III

"The Last Day" is the sixth, and last, episode of the third series of the British science fiction sitcom Red Dwarf and the eighteenth in the show overall.

It premiered on the British television channel BBC2 on 19 December 1989 and was written by Rob Grant and Doug Naylor, and directed by Ed Bye. The story is about Kryten's expiry date and how Lister decides to give him a last day to remember. The episode was remastered, along with the rest of the first three series, in 1998.

== Plot ==
Kryten (Robert Llewellyn) discovers that a message pod has reached Red Dwarf from Diva-Droid International, his manufacturers, announcing that he has reached his expiry date and will be forced to shut down automatically in 24 hours before he is to be replaced. Lister (Craig Charles), Rimmer (Chris Barrie) and Cat (Danny John-Jules) learn that Kryten has resigned himself to his fate, hoping to enjoy his reward in "Silicon Heaven", the mechanoid's version of an afterlife, despite Lister claiming no such place exists. Sickened by Kryten's attitude, Lister decides that he and the others should give Kryten an enjoyable time for his last day and hold a party for him. Kryten is touched by this and the presents they provide, including a special concoction of mechanoid alcohol crafted by Holly (Hattie Hayridge), and parties with the group all night.

The next morning, Kryten wakes up with a hangover, and realises he had experienced true pleasure for the first time. Desiring more, he decides he would much rather delay his departure, but when Lister suggests he overrides his shutdown programme, Kryten explains that he operates on a service contract; failing to shut down means his replacement will be programmed to terminate him as a result. The group opt to stand by him and force his replacement, Hudzen 10 (Gordon Kennedy), to leave Red Dwarf when he arrives. However, they soon find that Hudzen had been driven insane from travelling alone across space for millions of years and decides to kill everyone as a result. As he prepares to kill his predecessor, Kryten blurts out that Silicon Heaven does not exist. Unable to cope with this revelation, Hudzen shuts down. When Lister quizzes why Kryten's mind could cope but Hudzen's could not despite being a newer model, Kryten replies that he had a distinct advantage – his revelation was just a lie.

== Production ==
The character of Hudzen 10, played by Gordon Kennedy, was a last-minute addition to the script. Robert Llewellyn makes a brief, unmasked, appearance as Jim Reaper, the Diva-Droid executive and Julie Higginson plays the Marilyn Monroe kit android.

In the opening credits of Season 3, there is a shot of Kryten in a suit with a smile on his face. This shot is also shown in the Red Dwarf pictures screensaver. It was supposed to be from this episode but was never shown. It was also the only scene from "The Last Day" to be shown in the opening credits.

This was the last episode of Red Dwarf to be recorded in the BBC Manchester studios. Shortly after recording the third series the studios were closed for refurbishment. This meant the Red Dwarf production had to move to a new studio for the fourth series, with production relocated to Shepperton Studios.

== Cultural references ==
Brigitte Nielsen is referenced by Lister regarding Silicon Heaven that Kryten mentions. He then says that the notion of Silicon Heaven is "completely wacko, Jacko" referencing Michael Jackson's nickname. Kryten quotes a line from the Electronic Bible ("the iron shall lie down with the lamp"), which is a parody of a passage in Isaiah 11:6: "the wolf shall dwell with the lamb, and the leopard shall lie down with the kid".

Using a build-it-yourself kit droid Lister assembles a Marilyn Monroe bot as a leaving present for Kryten. Kryten is compared to Action Man in reference to his lack of genitalia, when asked if he would seduce the Monroe bot. Rimmer's present to Kryten is a tube of General George S. Patton's sinal fluid.

Star Trek is mentioned by Lister following the crew's decision to stick up for Kryten when the replacement arrives, Kryten regards this as true friendship, but Lister replies with "don't give me that Star Trek crap, it's too early in the morning".

Hudzen's POV "Hologram. Ex-human. VIABLE TARGET" parodies the Terminator's similar POV.

Rimmer mentions 1 Corinthians 13 from the Bible, referring to a (fictional) group called the Seventh Day Advent Hoppists (A play on Seventh-day Adventists who actually observe Saturday as the seventh day, not Sunday) that based their doctrine on a misprinting that gave the verse (v13, although this is not stated) as "faith, hop and charity... and the greatest of these is hop". In reality, apart from the obvious – "hop" being "hope" – the verse actually states that "charity" (rendered as "love" in most modern English translations) is the greatest.

This is the first episode of the show to discuss Lister's childhood, and how he was raised an orphan after being found in a cardboard box under a pool table in a pub. This would be mentioned sporadically throughout the following series but is not fully explored until the Series VII episode "Ouroboros".

== Reception ==
The episode was originally broadcast on the British television channel BBC2 on 19 December 1989.

In a 1992 fan poll conducted by the Red Dwarf magazine it ranked 18 out of the 30 then-existing episodes, and was the lowest placed Series III episode.

Writing in 2017 for CultBox, Sophie Davies said that the episode has "some nice religious satire" and "provides a satisfying ending to the series, bringing the crew closer together and cementing Kryten as a permanent part of it."

== Remastering ==
The changes made to "The Last Day" are:

- The opening shot of the post pod approaching Red Dwarf has been replaced with a CGI sequence.
- Hudzen's ship approaching Red Dwarf has been replaced with a CGI version.

The re-mastered episodes were generally received poorly by fans of the show, though one critic said it was "actually an invigorating new take on a classic series". The re-mastered series was later released, along with other material, on The Bodysnatcher DVD boxset, in 2007.
