= Parallel Universe (Red Dwarf) =

- Red Dwarf episode
- Episode no.: Series 2 Episode 6
- Directed by: Ed Bye
- Written by: Rob Grant; Doug Naylor
- Original air date: 11 October 1988

Guest appearances
- Suzanne Bertish as Arlene Rimmer; Angela Bruce as Deb Lister; Matthew Devitt as The Dog; Hattie Hayridge as Hilly

Episode chronology
← Previous "Queeg"	Next → "Backwards"
- Red Dwarf II

"Parallel Universe" is the sixth episode of science fiction sitcom Red Dwarf series two, and the twelfth in the show's run. It premiered on the British television channel BBC2 on 11 October 1988 and was written by Rob Grant and Doug Naylor, and directed by Ed Bye.

The plot involves the Red Dwarf crew travelling to a parallel universe where they meet alternative versions of themselves. This marked the final appearance of Norman Lovett as Holly until 1997.

The episode was remastered, along with the rest of the first three series, in 1998.

== Plot ==
The ship's computer Holly (Norman Lovett) invents a new drive system called the "Holly Hop Drive", declaring that it can theoretically get Red Dwarf back to Earth in an instant. When Arnold Rimmer (Chris Barrie), Dave Lister (Craig Charles) and Cat (Danny John-Jules) decide to use the new system, it transports the ship into a parallel universe, and near a parallel version of Red Dwarf. On board, Rimmer, Lister and Holly encounter their female counterparts—Arlene Rimmer (Suzanne Bertish), Deb Lister (Angela Bruce) and Hilly (Hattie Hayridge)—discovering that in this universe, women hold a dominant position in society, while men fought for equal rights. Cat, expecting to encounter his female counterpart, is shocked to find it to be actually a male dog-like humanoid named Dog (Matthew Devitt).

Holly and Hilly reveal that they need a day to repair the drive, leaving the two groups to socialise in the disco for the night. Lister and Rimmer are soon put off by their counterparts—the former criticising Deb on her qualities despite sharing them himself, and the latter resisting Arlene's overbearing sexual advances—while Cat and Dog disagree on dance techniques. Despite this, Lister has sex with Deb, but is shocked in the morning when Arlene points out that men in their universe get pregnant, rather than women. After Holly and Hilly confirm this, Lister becomes horrified that this universe's rules will ensure this. After he, Rimmer, Cat and Holly return to their Red Dwarf and universe, Lister conducts a pregnancy test. As he waits for the results, Holly speculates that this might be the answer to how he saw a "future echo" of himself with twin boys, to which Rimmer delights in how he recalled Lister's response to finding it out. The results eventually coming back positive, much to Lister's dismay.

== Production ==
Hattie Hayridge appears as Hilly, Holly's female counterpart, in this episode. Producer Paul Jackson had seen her on Saturday Live and suggested her as a counterpart for Lovett. This was to be Norman Lovett's last appearance as Holly until Series VII. Holly would be played by Hayridge from Series III.

Angela Bruce played Deb Lister, Suzanne Bertish played Arlene Rimmer and Matthew Devitt played the Dog.

Rimmer meets his alter-ego

To keep costs down existing shots of the Red Dwarf ship were matted together to give the appearance of two of them. This enabled the crew to use the finances on other model shots. The scenes would later be recreated for the remastered version using CGI.

== Reception ==
The episode was originally broadcast on the British television channel BBC2 on 11 October 1988.

The episode was considered the best from Series II according to a readers' poll in Red Dwarf magazine, placing sixth overall out of the 30 then-existing episodes, with 5.6% voting for it.

Sophie Davies, writing in 2017 for CultBox, noted the expansion of the range of characters and locations, and was "pleasantly surprised" at the episode, continuing "It's not groundbreaking stuff, but considering 'Parallel Universe' aired in 1988 – along with the fact that I can remember much later installments of Red Dwarf where the gender politics are very iffy indeed – it could have been a whole lot worse."

== Tongue Tied ==
For time reasons, "Parallel Universe" was shown without its opening credit sequence, and was originally shown with no episode titles at all, although the introduction sequence would later be added in the remastered version. Instead the viewer was led straight into the Cat's song dream scene, where the Cat performs the "Tongue Tied" song, with Rimmer and Lister on backing vocals. The "Tongue Tied" lyrics were written by Grant and Naylor and the music was produced by Howard Goodall. The dance sequence, which was choreographed by Charles Augins (who appeared in the previous episode, "Queeg"), also had to be trimmed down.

The song "Tongue Tied", which features in the Cat's opening dream sequence, was received so well that it was later released as a single. It was re-arranged and re-recorded by Danny John-Jules (under the name 'The Cat') and released in October 1993. It reached number 17 in the UK charts. A video to accompany the release which starred Danny John-Jules as some of his Red Dwarf alter-egos, including Duane Dibbley, was also produced. It was based around a storyline written by Danny John-Jules and featured music videos for some of the remixes, with guest appearances from the rest of the Red Dwarf cast, along with Clayton Mark ("Elvis" in "Meltdown") and Augins.

== Remastering ==
The remastering of Series I to III was carried out during the late 1990s. Changes throughout the series included replacement of the opening credits, giving the picture a colour grade and filmising, computer-generated special effects of Red Dwarf and many more visual and audio enhancements. Changes made specific to "Parallel Universe" include the addition of video and sound effects of Red Dwarf jumping into the parallel universe. The shots of the twin Red Dwarf ships side by side have been replaced with the new CGI versions. Video and sound effects of Red Dwarf jumping back into its own universe were added.
