= Nick Stringer =

English actor (born 1948)

- Born: 10 August 1948 (age 76); Torquay, Devon, England
- Occupation: Actor
- Years active: 1976–2017
- Children: 2

Nick Stringer (born 10 August 1948 in Torquay, Devon) is an English actor.

In his forty-year career, Stringer has appeared in numerous well-known British television shows, including The Bill, Bergerac , Open All Hours, Only Fools and Horses, Auf Wiedersehen, Pet, Coronation Street, Family Affairs, Minder, Johnny Jarvis, Butterflies, My Family and The Professionals. He also had roles in the films The Long Good Friday (1980), Clockwise (1986) and Personal Services (1987).

In The Bill he played PC Ron Smollett, a likeable, hard-working, and honest cop, from 1990 to 1993.

Stringer appeared in the first two series of The New Statesman as the fictional Member of Parliament Bob Crippen, a Labour opponent of the Conservative Alan B'Stard.

Other roles have included a cameo role in Goodnight Sweetheart in the episode "You're Driving Me Crazy" as an undercover detective, and as a deputy headmaster Mr Sullivan in Press Gang (mainly appearing in the first two seasons). He appeared in the BBC drama Holby City, in an episode entitled "Doctor's Dilemma", on 18 June 2008.

Stringer has also made two guest appearances in the BBC sitcom Only Fools and Horses, in the episodes "Go West Young Man" he plays an Australian and in "Who Wants to be a Millionaire", he plays Del's old business partner, Jumbo Mills, who emigrated to Australia.

He is also noted for his strong performance alongside Trevor Byfield in the Minder episode 'The Old School Tie' from Series 2 in 1980 in which they play heavies in what is often claimed to be the most violent episode of the entire ten series.

Nick also appeared in Super Gran as super villain Mad Mick Merseyside. (1985)

Stringer lives in Bristol, England, and is married with two children. In 2018, Stringer recorded a two-part interview for The Bill Podcast

== Filmography ==
=== Film ===
Year	Title	Role	Notes
1978	The Shout	Cobbler	
1978	The Life Story of Baal	Taxi Driver	
1979	That Summer!	Policeman	
1980	The Long Good Friday	Billy	
1982	Give Us This Day	Mr. Burton	
1983	The Terence Davies Trilogy	Robert's Father	(segment: Madonna and Child)
1986	Clockwise	Det. Sgt. Rice	
1987	Personal Services	P.C. Baker	
1988	We Think the World of You	Butcher	
1989	Work Experience	Man on phone	Short film
1996	Stella Does Tricks	Edward	
1999	Captain Jack	Chip Shop Owner	
2005	Oliver Twist	Inspector Blather	
2008	The Edge of Love	PC Williams	
2008	I Know You Know	Mic the barman	
2017	Karen	Unknown	Short film

=== Television ===
Year	Title	Role	Notes
1978	Pickersgill People	PC Shane Pritchard	3 episodes
1978	The Devil's Crown	Marchades	Episode: "Bolt from the Blue"
1978	A Soft Touch	Zoo keeper	Episode: "The Toad Work"
1978	Target	Matthews	Episode: "Figures of Importance"
1978	The Sweeney	Patsy Kearny	Episode: "One of Your Own"
1978	Play for Today	Terry	Episode: "Soldiers Talking, Cleanly"
1979	Angels	Frank Coidin	2 episodes
1979	The Knowledge	Cabbie	Television film
1980	The Spoils of War	Charlie	Episode: "End of the Beginning"
1980	Butterflies	Wally	Episode: "An Empty Cage"
1980	Nobody's Perfect	Ernie	Episode: "Henry Moves In"
1980	Minder	Tommy	Episode: "The Old School Tie"
1980	Shoestring	Steve	Episode: "The Dangerous Game"
1981	Big Jim and the Figaro Club	Mayor	Episode: "Laughing Like a Drain"
1981	Rosie	Van driver	Episode: "The Eight Foot Goat"
1981	The Gentle Touch	Jimmy Paris	Episode: "Knife"
1981–1982	Open All Hours	Man Neville	2 episodes
1982	The Professionals	Twig	Episode: "Spy Probe"
1982	The New Adventures of Lucky Jim	George Bowles	4 episodes
1983	Gaskin	Labour councillor	Television film
1975–1983	Crown Court	Bill Robbins Jury Foreman	2 episodes
1983	Goodnight and God Bless	Harry	4 episodes
1983	Come to Mecca	Roger	Television film
1983	Johnny Jarvis	The Colonel	5 episodes
1984	Poor Little Rich Girls	Thickset Man	Episode: "The Oriental Chest"
1985	One by One	Caldwell	Episode: "Parting of the Ways"
1985	Dempsey and Makepeace	Piglet	Episode: "Nowhere to Run"
1985	Super Gran	Mad Mick	Episode: "Supergran Grounded"
1985	Dramarama	Trevor Taylor	Episode: "The Audition"
1985	Black Silk	Harry	Episode: "Conspiracy of Silence"
1986	Auf Wiedersehen, Pet	Customs Officer	Episode: "No Sex Please, We're Brickies"
1986	The Collectors	Roper	Episode: "Uncommon Market"
1986	C.A.T.S. Eyes	Bouncer	Episode: "Tranmere Dan and Tokyo Joe"
1981–1986	Only Fools and Horses	Aussie Man Jumbo Mills	2 episodes
1987	A Sort of Innocence	Roger Stott	2 episodes
1988	Hannay	Brabazon	Episode: "Voyage into Fear"
1988	Bergerac	George Lacey	Episode: "Private Fight"
1988	ScreenPlay	Dave Sgt. Brooks	2 episodes
1988	Bread	Julian La Mere	Episode: #4.2
1988	This Is David Lander	Reg Ward	Episode: "Not a Pretty Site"
1988	Blind Justice	Bill Turner	Episode: "Permanent Blue"
1988	The Lenny Henry Show	Various	Episode: "Christmas 1988"
1987–1989	The New Statesman	Crippen Bob Crippen	4 episodes
1989	Capstick's Law	Birties	3 episodes
1986–1989	Boon	Mr. Sheridan Wiggins	2 episodes
1989	About Face	Police Chief	Episode: "Send Her Victorious"
1990	Tygo Road	Tim	Episode: #1.2
1990	A Kind of Living	Gordon	Episode: #3.9
1990	Shoot to Kill	Kevin Taylor	Television film
1989–1992	Press Gang	Mr. Sullivan	15 episodes
1985–1993	The Bill	Terry Mitchell P.C. Smollett	81 episodes
1993	Inside Victor Lewis-Smith	'Old Bill' Policeman 2	Episode: #1.2
1994	Earthfasts	Police Sergeant	Episode: #1.3
1994	Birds of a Feather	Police Supt	Episode: "Christmas in Dreamland"
1995	The Famous Five	Mr. Curton	Episode: "Five on Kirrin Island Again"
1997	Goodnight Sweetheart	Tommy Kingdom	Episode: "You're Driving Me Crazy"
1997	The Missing Postman	Farmer Flint	Television film
1984–1997	Coronation Street	Frank Harvey Jump Jackson	16 episodes
1999	Peak Practice	PC Pete Greenhaigh	Episode: "Single Minded"
1999	Murder Most Horrid	Inspector Hibbert	Episode: "Elvis, Zeus and Zack"
1999	Family Affairs	Max Derwin	49 episodes
2000	My Family	Mitch	Episode: "Farewell to Alarms"
2001	Gentlemen's Relish	Edward Shelburne	Television film
2001	Always and Everyone	D.C. Simms	Episode: #3.8
2001	Kommissarie Winter	Alderton	Episode: "Dans med en ängel – Del 1"
2003	Born and Bred	Reg Samuel	Episode: "The Last Hurrah: Part 2"
2004	Doctors	D.I. Green	Episode: "Cross My Heart"
2005	Down to Earth	Clive Mottram	Episode: "Sisterly Feelings"
2006	Berry's Way	Dawson	Television film
2009	Broadside	De Ruyter	Television film
2004–2010	Holby City	Andy McBride Bernard Robson Gordon Ramsey	3 episodes
