= Gary Shail =

English actor

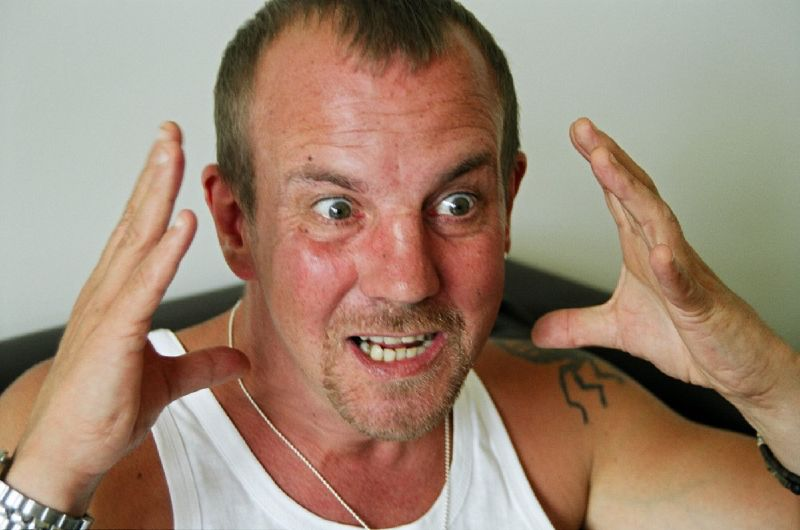
- self-portrait (2005)
- Born: 10 November 1959 (age 66)
- Occupations: Actor, composer, songwriter
- Years active: 1977–present

Gary Shail in the 80s

Gary Shail (born 10 November 1959) is an English actor, director, producer and musician.

== Career ==
Gary Shail began work in TV and film in 1977 and is best known for his roles as Spider in the 1979 film Quadrophenia and as Steve, the punky teenager in The Metal Mickey TV Show, he is also known as the "young walking boy" in an alternate version of the video clip True, by Spandau Ballet.

Shail appeared in the 1980 series The Further Adventures of Oliver Twist, portrayed Oscar Drill in Shock Treatment, the 1981 follow-up to The Rocky Horror Picture Show, and portrayed Guy Raines in the 1983 BBC production Johnny Jarvis. He wrote the original songs and theme music for this production, for which he received a nomination for the Ivor Novello Awards. In 1988 Shail appeared as the pimp "Billy White" in the TV mini-series of Jack the Ripper, starring Michael Caine. He has made appearances in the TV series The Bill, Casualty, and The Professionals.

In 1995, Shail began working with music production company Natural Sound Source in London, producing music for television, film, and advertising. In 2004, he produced the Arabic fusion album Infinity in Dubai.

In 2010, Shail was back in the recording studio working on his autobiographical self-penned album Daze Like This. A collection of new songs interspersed with some re-workings of some Johnny Jarvis themes.

In October 2015, Shail's memoir I Think I'm On The Guest List was published.

In 2016, Shail returned to acting with a cameo role in the film Stranger, where he was cast as a psychopathic cowboy. In 2019 Shail starred in the film 'To be someone' which also featured many of the original cast of Quadrophenia. Gary Shail now lives in Dorset where he continues to compose and produce music in his own residential recording studio.

== Filmography ==
Selected films include:

- Quadrophenia (1979) - Spider
- The Music Machine (1979) - Aldo
- Shock Treatment (1981) - Oscar Drill
- Give My Regards to Broad Street (1984) - Apache Dancer
- The Bride (1985) - First Circus Hand
- Jack the Ripper (1988) - Pimp
- Jekyll & Hyde (1990) - Sailor
- Day of the Stranger (2020) - Loomweather

TV:

- The Professionals (1980) Episode "Take Away" - Jimmy
- Metal Mickey (1980–1983) - Steve
