= Ghost Train (TV series) =

1989 British children's TV programme

- Genre: Children's; Entertainment
- Starring: Frances Dodge; Paul J. Medford; Sabra Williams; Angelo Abela
- Countries of origin: United Kingdom; Channel Islands
- Original language: English
- No. of seasons: 3
- No. of episodes: 63

Original release
- Network: ITV
- Release: 1 April 1989 – 24 August 1991

Ghost Train is a children's television programme broadcast on ITV, from 1 April 1989 to 24 August 1991.

== Storyline ==
The series concept involved presenter Frances Dodge inheriting a ghost train from her grandmother. With the help of fellow presenters Paul J Medford and Sabra Williams, she sneaks the train from the grasp of the evil Barry Mafia (Joe Hall) and makes her escape. Inside is a startled Gerard (Angelo Abela), the aliens' favourite broadcaster, and a camp sounding talking sheep, named Nobby (a puppet operated and voiced by Simon Buckley). However, Barry Mafia is after them, aided by the Mafiaettes.

As Barry hatched several schemes to get his hands on the Ghost Train, the trio of friends used the train as a platform for special guests, live performances from pop music artists, and introduced various cartoons including Scooby-Doo, The Real Ghostbusters and The Trap Door. At the end of series two, Barry finally regained control of the Train, but would lose it back to Frances in series three. The series ended on a cliffhanger, with the crew exiled to an alien planet.

=== Sunday spin-off ===
A spin-off Sunday morning series, Ghost Train on Sunday, was produced in 1989 by Border Television and presented by Shauna Lowry.

== Transmission guide ==
- Series 1: 22 editions from 1 April 1989 – 26 August 1989
- Series 2: 19 editions from 21 April 1990 – 25 August 1990
- Series 3: 21 editions from 6 April 1991 – 24 August 1991
