= David Lindup =

English composer (1928–1992)

- Born: 10 May 1928; East Preston, West Sussex, England
- Died: 7 January 1992 (aged 63) Southampton, Hampshire, England
- Genres: Library music; jazz; pop
- Occupation(s): Composer, arranger and orchestrator
- Years active: 1960–1992
- Labels: KPM
- Spouse: Nadia Cattouse (m. 1958)

David Lindup (10 May 1928 – 7 January 1992) was an English composer, arranger and orchestrator best known for his collaborations with John Dankworth and his library music (often for KPM).

Lindup composed music for TV series including The Informer, Survival, Journey to the Unknown, The Persuaders! and Diamonds, as well as film scores such as Games That Lovers Play (1971), White Cargo (1973), Shatter (1974), The Spiral Staircase (1975), and the film version of Rising Damp (1980). The library music he composed is usually uncredited in films and TV programmes, although a younger audience is likely to have heard it in recent years; Midnight Serenade is featured in two Electronic Arts video games for PlayStation 2 (The Godfather and The Sims 2: Castaway). That song was also included in the 2018 film The Catcher Was a Spy. The animated series SpongeBob SquarePants is another beneficiary of Lindup's work. He orchestrated the scores for musical films such as Goodbye, Mr. Chips (1969) and Scrooge (1970). The trailer of the film The Full Monty (1997) credits use of Lindup's composition Zodiac, which is played over the opening credits along with a promotional film from the early 1970s - Sheffield - City On The Move.

His recording of the Dankworth-David Dearlove song "Let's Slip Away", accompanying Susan Grey, features as source music in the films Saturday Night and Sunday Morning (1960) and A Taste of Honey (1961).

== Personal life ==
Lindup was born in East Preston, West Sussex. He was married to Belizean-born British actress and singer Nadia Cattouse; their son Mike is the keyboardist for Jazz-pop band Level 42. Lindup died in Southampton on 7 January 1992.
