= Johnny Jarvis =

- Genre: Drama
- Created by: Nigel Williams
- Starring: Mark Farmer; Johanna Hargreaves; Ian Sears; Alrick Riley; Jamie Foreman; Nick Stringer
- Theme music composer: Gary Shail & John Altman
- Country of origin: United Kingdom
- Original language: English
- No. of series: 1
- No. of episodes: 6

Production
- Producer: Guy Slater
- Running time: c. 50 minute episodes

Original release
- Network: BBC1
- Release: 10 November – 15 December 1983

Johnny Jarvis is a 1983 British six-part television drama series created and written by Nigel Williams, adapted from his novel of the same title. The series was directed by Alan Dossor and produced by Guy Slater for the BBC. The principal actors were Mark Farmer, Johanna Hargreaves, Ian Sears, Alrick Riley and Jamie Foreman. Today it is credited as capturing the zeitgeist of early 1980s UK life. The adaptation was broadcast between 10 November and 15 December 1983. The signature tune for the series was provided by Gary Shail and the music for the series was by John Altman. It had been rumoured that the original series has been erased from the BBC's tape archive, preventing any further release but extant copies on sale prove the rumour to be incorrect. It was released on DVD in November 2017.

== Plot summary ==
The story centres on Johnny Jarvis (Mark Farmer) and Alan Lipton (Ian Sears) who are two teenagers in their final year of secondary school at a comprehensive in Hackney. Energetic, anxious and occasionally naïve, the pair are on the brink of entering the adult world.

Jarvis has always been the class clown, and his unlikely friendship with ‘bookish’ Lipton - a boy with his head ‘stuck in the clouds’ as he considers what the future has in store for him, and considers the image of the father he has never known - is one of the more unusual unions in the story. The pair successfully leave school brimming with hope, but soon find that the harsh reality of Britain in the late 1970s has little to offer them - they are soon both unemployed school-leavers struggling to make progress in the world and the part they play in it.

Life in the confines of school and life on the outside are two entirely different things, as Jarvis and Lipton discover the strongest elements of their school lives are reversed over the course of the series; Jarvis, once a popular ‘jack-the-lad’ character with the world as his oyster, is ultimately left poverty-stricken and relatively isolated, whilst Lipton, who starts the serial emerging from school and finding himself in a grotty squat existence, blossoms from a studious character into a popular new wave songwriter for a group called New Wastrels, the lyrics of songs for which were based on Johnny's downward spiral and terrible existence. This linear storyline has a thriller-esque sub-plot concerning a mysterious drug dealer, known as "The Colonel", holding Lipton to ransom in his mother's tower-block flat at the same time that Jarvis' fortunes are no better, minding his child in a bed-sit whilst his girlfriend, the complicated Stella (Johanna Hargreaves), brings in the sole wage in order to support them all.

School associates of Jarvis and Lipton, skinhead Manning (Jamie Foreman) and black carpenter Paul Turner (Alrick Riley) provide an intertwined story of inner city racial conflict which highlights that period of street disturbances in British History (1981-1985).

The theme music and original songs were written by Gary Shail (Quadrophenia, Metal Mickey) and arranged by John Altman.

The series explores the conditions of schoolchildren under (then) Prime Minister of United Kingdom Margaret Thatcher and particularly the challenges faced by schoolchildren emerging from education to find limited employment opportunities and few prospects awaiting them.

== Episodes ==
1. "1977-1978" (first broadcast 10 November 1983)
  "The unlikely friendship between Johnny Jarvis and Alan Lipton begins in their last year at a comprehensive in Hackney. Jarvis, the loveable clown with a surprising talent for welding. Lipton, the apparently talentless reject, fantasising about the future and the father he has never met. At the end of the year they have to confront the adult world"
2. "1978-1979" (first broadcast 17 November 1983)
  "Lipton and Jarvis encounter the amazing Stella for the first time. Turner finds work - of a fairly eccentric kind. Jake remains mysterious and evasive. For both Lipton and Jarvis their relationships with their fathers take a dramatic turn."
3. "1979-1980" (first broadcast 24 November 1983)
  "Life at the squat for Stella and Lipton isn't easy. Jake has disappeared again. Both Lipton and the mysterious "Colonel" want to find him - and the Colonel isn't too fussy about his methods. However, Turner is in work - if not earning money; and Jarvis is busy at Technical College, where he acquires a girlfriend."
4. "1980-1981" (first broadcast 1 December 1983)
  "Lipton and Guy become the self-appointed leaders of a band at the hostel, singing Alan's songs. Stella moves in to live with Johnny - and his mother. Then a surprising newcomer turns up at the hostel"
5. "1981-1982" (first broadcast 8 December 1983)
  "A shadowy drug dealer called The Colonel holds the rock writer Lipton as a prisoner in his mother's council flat. Jarvis is also flat-bound, compelled to baby-sit while Stella goes out to work"
6. "1982-1983" (first broadcast 15 December 1983)
  "Johnny and Stella move in to live with Alan in his new flat. But it's not easy to revive old friendships, and the tensions run high."

== Cast ==
- Johnny Jarvis – (Mark Farmer)
- Alan Lipton – (Ian Sears)
- Paul Turner – (Alrick Riley)
- Manning – (Jamie Foreman)
- Stella – (Johanna Hargreaves)
- Mr Jarvis – (John Bardon)
- Mrs Jarvis – (Catherine Harding)
- Mrs Lipton – (Diana Davies)
- Bennerman – (Mark Penfold)
- Sidney – (Ian Brimble)
- Mr Casson – (Lionel Ngakane)
- Clare – (Diana Kyle)
- Mason – (Jim Dunk)
- David Sales – (Neil Cunningham)
- Guy Raines – (Gary Shail)
- Careers Officer – (Caroline Lancaster)
- Mrs Stapleton – (Peggy Phango)
- Barber – (Robert Putt)
- PE Teacher – (Martin Anthony)
- Benson – (Paul Vincent)
- Knight – (Mike Smart)
- The Colonel – (Nick Stringer)
- Arthur – (Anthony Powell)
- Jake – (Maurice Colbourne)
- Mrs Turner – (Nadia Cattouse)
- Mr Turner – (Tommy Eytle)
- Stephen Turner – (Ancel McFarlane)
- Sharon Turner – (Sonya Saul)
- New Wastrel – (Nik Corfield)
