= Thanks for the Memory (Red Dwarf) =

- Red Dwarf episode
- Episode no.: Series 2 Episode 3
- Directed by: Ed Bye
- Written by: Rob Grant; Doug Naylor
- Original air date: 20 September 1988

Guest appearance
- Sabra Williams as Lise Yates

Episode chronology
← Previous "Better Than Life"	Next → "Stasis Leak"
- Red Dwarf II

"Thanks for the Memory" is the third episode of science fiction sitcom Red Dwarf series two and the ninth in the series run. It premiered on BBC2 on 20 September 1988.

The episode was written by Rob Grant and Doug Naylor, and directed by Ed Bye and has the Red Dwarf crew investigating how, and why, they lost four days from their memory. The episode was remastered, along with the rest of the first three series, in 1998.

== Plot ==
On a Saturday night, while the Red Dwarf group hold a party for him on the anniversary of his death, Arnold Rimmer drunkenly confides in Dave Lister about his time with the ship's female boxing champion, Yvonne McGruder, and how it was the only sexual encounter he ever had. Rimmer admits that, while he opted to put his career over his personal life, he would trade it all in just "to be loved, and to have been in love." When he, Lister and Cat wake up after the party, they find it to be Thursday rather than Sunday. The group quickly find several odd things – Lister's jigsaw puzzle is solved; several pages from Lister's diary are missing; both Lister and Cat have broken a leg each; Holly's star charts he was mapping have been tampered with, and the ship's black box is missing. To solve the mystery, the group trace the black box by its signal on a barren moon, buried in a shallow grave next to a giant footprint and marked by a headstone that reads "To the memory of the memory of Lise Yates".

Returning to the ship with the black box, the group review its footage and discover what happened over the past few days. After feeling sorry for Rimmer, Lister visited the Hologram Suite intending to give him a present and uploaded his memory of eight months with Lise Yates (Sabra Williams), an old girlfriend, making it one of Rimmer's. The following morning, Rimmer woke in a jubilant mood but questioned elements of his new memories. His happiness was soon broken when he found Lise's letters to Lister and assumed she was dating them both, forcing Lister to reveal what he did. Rimmer realises that this was the reason he had two appendectomies. Seeing him distraught and hurt from the truth, despite his best efforts to comfort him, Lister decided the group should erase all traces of the past few days from their memories. After burying the black box with a tombstone Rimmer wanted – the task leading to Lister and Cat breaking their legs in the process and creating the footprint they would find – Lister completed his jigsaw puzzle, removed the pages from his diary, before he and the others went to erase their memories.

== Production ==
A quarry in Wales was used for the location of Rimmer's death-day opening scene for the episode. The live action footage of the scene was merged with model footage of Blue Midget and Red Dwarf, which was seen in the distant background. During the pre-record filming of the episode, Craig Charles's then-wife was giving birth to their son Jack; Craig filmed the scenes where Lister's face was visible as quickly as possible and then rushed away to be at the birth of his son (arriving twenty minutes late). The remainder of location shooting, in which Lister was wearing a space-suit, had production manager Mike Agnew as the double for Lister. But in fact the plaster cast could not fit Agnew's foot as he had bigger feet than Craig Charles – a close look at the episode would reveal that there are several frames in the episode where neither the Cat nor Lister (stood in by Agnew) had casts. To film Lister's drunken pilot skills on the flight back to Red Dwarf, wires were used by the model team to give the jerking motion. The one guest star was Sabra Williams who plays Lise Yates.

== Similarity to Star Trek: The Next Generation ==
In their book The Red Dwarf Programme Guide, Chris Howarth and Steve Lyons point out the "uncanny similarities" between the Red Dwarf episode "Thanks for the Memory" and the Star Trek: The Next Generation episode "Clues", which aired on American television nearly two and half years later. Howarth and Lyons note that the American show "has the cast waking up to find that time has passed of which they have no memory. Despite the resistance of their mechanical crew member, they attempt to find out what has happened, but learn that they were better off not knowing. One of them even has a broken limb..."

== Reception ==
Originally broadcast on the British television channel BBC2 on 20 September 1988, the episode was voted by readers of the Red Dwarf Smegazine in a 1992 poll as the 19th best episode of the 30 then existing, attracting 1.9% of the vote. This made it the fifth-ranked of Series 2's episodes.

Director Ed Bye stated in the Series II documentary, "It's Cold Outside", that the episode was a standout of the series.

== Remastering ==
The remastering of Series I to III was carried out during the late 1990s. Changes throughout the series included replacement of the opening credits, giving the picture a colour grade and filmising, computer generated special effects of Red Dwarf and many more visual and audio enhancements.

Changes made specific to "Thanks for the Memory" include a new opening shot with the new Blue Midget CGI design has been added, along with the CGI Red Dwarf, to original live-action footage. Scenes of Blue Midget staggering back to Red Dwarf have been replaced with new CGI footage. All flashback shots have been given a faded tint and blurred edge. Rimmer's Spanish television joke referring to the quality of the viewscreen monitor has been removed. A Felicity Kendal reference has been replaced with Marilyn Monroe, on the basis that it felt dated. It was intended for a Jimmy Osmond joke to be removed for similar reasons, but this was not done.
