= Five Guys Named Moe =

1990 musical

- Original logo
- Music: Louis Jordan
- Lyrics: Louis Jordan
- Book: Clarke Peters
- Productions: 1990 West End; 1992 Broadway; 2002 Chicago Drury Lane South; 2010 Edinburgh Festival; 2014–15 Arena Stage and Cleveland Play House; 2017 Offie
- Awards: Laurence Olivier Award for Best Entertainment

Five Guys Named Moe is a musical with a book by Clarke Peters and lyrics and music by Louis Jordan and others. The musical is based on an earlier musical short of the same name by Louis Jordan from 1943. It had its UK debut at the Cottesloe Theatre at the National Theatre followed by a short run at the Theatre Royal Stratford East, before moving to the West End for over four years in, and finally premiering on Broadway in 1992. It was revived in 2010 at Edinburgh Festival, starring Peters himself, and returned later in 2010 to the theatre in which it originally premiered. The musical won the Laurence Olivier Award for Best Entertainment.

== Plot summary ==
Nomax, whose girlfriend has left him and who is without money, finds Big Moe, Four-Eyed Moe, Eat Moe, No Moe, and Little Moe emerging from his 1930s-style radio to comfort him. They sing the hit songs of songwriter and saxophonist Louis Jordan, whose new slant on jazz paved the way for rock and roll in the 1950s.

== Production history ==
The musical was originally presented at the Cottesloe Theatre. Cameron Mackintosh opened it on 14 December 1990 at London's West End Lyric Theatre. The original Stratford East cast of Kenny Andrews, Paul J. Medford, Peter Alex Newton, Omar F. Okai, and Dig Wayne, were joined by Clinton Derricks-Carroll replacing Clarke Peters, all transferred with the production where it ran until 4 March 1995. It re-opened at the Albery Theatre on 25 May 1995 where it was recorded for commercial DVD with the following cast: Tee Jaye Jenkins, Trent Kendall, Monroe Kent III (Nomax), Jason Pennycooke, Richard D. Sharp and Feruma Williams. The production ran with this cast until 13 January 1996.

There was also a successful UK tour that opened in September 1995 that once again had Charles Augins as director, this time joined by Steve Hill as musical director. The tour cast included Jon Clairmont as Nomax, Parrish Collier as Four-Eyed Moe, Robert Grose as No Moe, Paul Hazel as Eat Moe, Horace Oliver as Little Moe and Walter Herron Reynolds III as Big Moe.

The Broadway production, directed and choreographed by Charles Augins, opened on 8 April 1992 at the Eugene O'Neill Theatre, where it ran for 445 performances and 19 previews. The cast included Jerry Dixon, Doug Eskew, Milton Craig Nealy, Kevin Ramsey, Jeffrey D. Sams, and Glenn Turner.

The "Moe" band was: Reginald Royal, piano; Luico Hopper, bass; Brian Kirk, drums; Reggie Pittman, trumpet & flugelhorn; Gregory Charles Royal, trombone; and Mark Gross, saxophone and clarinet.

Original cast recordings from both the London and Broadway productions were released.

In 1993, the Center Theatre Group/Ahmanson in Los Angeles kicked off the first U.S. National tour. Doug Eskew and Milton Craig Nealy continued the roles they played on Broadway: Big Moe and Four-Eyed Moe, respectively. Keith Tyrone, Jeffrey Polk and Kevyn Bracket, joined the cast as No Moe, Little Moe and Eat Moe. The production opened on 15 July 1993 at the James A. Doolittle Theatre on the campus of UCLA. The subsequent tour included stops in Toronto at the Royal Alexandra Theatre (Sept 29-Nov 6, 1993)[need more tour stop info] Cincinnati, OH at the Taft Theatre (18–23 January 1994).

In 2002 a "Theater in the Round" production was mounted at the Drury Lane South Theatre in Chicago, IL. Directed by Marc Robin and starring Sean Blake (No Moe), John Steven Crowley (Big Moe), Anthony Pierre Christopher (Little Moe), Parrish Collier (Four-Eyed Moe) and Byron Glenn Willis (Eat Moe) with Nikkieli Dimone as Nomax. The production earned two Joseph Jefferson Nominations in the Director and Ensemble categories.

The 2010 Edinburgh Festival/West End production, directed by Paulette Randall and starring Clarke Peters himself as Nomax, as well as Ashley Campbell, Christopher Colquhoun, Carlton Connell, Paul Hazel and Horace Oliver as the Moes opened on 5 August 2010.

During the 2014–15 season, a new, re-imagined production was co-produced by Arena Stage and Cleveland Play House. This production featured the five Moes as 21st century musicians and a slightly modernized musical arrangement. The production ran 14 November – 28 December 2014 at Arena Stage and 23 January – 15 February 2015 in Cleveland Play House's Allen Theatre. The production was directed by Robert O'Hara.

Following a run in 2016 at the Edinburgh Fringe Festival, a London Off-West End revival was produced by Underbelly Productions in association with Cameron Mackintosh, Steven Harris and Westminster Council ran from 14 September 2017 at the Marble Arch Theatre, a new pop-up venue in Marble Arch specifically designed for the production that reflected the 1940 New Orleans jazz bars. The venue was originally stopped from opening in Victoria Embankment due to criticism from neighbours. The Musical Director for the production was Steve Hill, who returned to the show after first being musical director on the original UK Tour back in 1995.

From 7 September to 8 October 2017, Court Theatre in Chicago's Hyde Park neighborhood mounted a production featuring James Earl Jones II, Darrian Ford, Lorenzo Rush Jr., Kelvin Roston Jr., Eric Andrew Lewis, and Stephen Allen, directed by Ron OJ Parson with music direction by Abdul Hamid Royal.

The show received a London fringe revival in 2021 at Upstairs at The Gatehouse. Direction and choreography was by resident director of the 2017 London production, Mykal Rand. Musical supervision by John Reddel and musical direction by Griffin Jenkins. The cast featured Juan Jackson as Nomax; and KM Drew Boatan, Christian Maynard, AJ Lewis, Andre Coulson, Kieran McGinn as the Moes. The production received favourable reviews.

== Song list ==
Act I

- "Early in the Morning" (music and lyrics by Jordan, Leo Hickman, and Dallas Bartley)
- "Five Guys Named Moe" (music and lyrics by Larry Wynn and Jerry Bresler)
- "Beware Brother Beware" (music and lyrics by Morry Lasco, Dick Adams, and Fleecie Moore)
- "I Like 'em Fat Like That" (music and lyrics by Claude Demetrius and Jordan)
- "Messy Bessy" (music and lyrics by Jon Hendricks)
- "Pettin' and Pokin'" (music and lyrics by Lora Lee)
- "Life Is So Peculiar" (music and lyrics by Johnny Burke and Jimmy Van Heusen)
- "I Know What I've Got" (music and lyrics by Sid Robin and Jordan)
- "Azure Te" (music and lyrics by Bill Davis and Don Wolf)
- "Safe, Sane and Single" (music and lyrics by Jordan, Johnny Lange, and Hy Heath)
- "Push Ka Pi Shi Pie" (music and lyrics by Jordan, Joe Willoughby, Walt Merrick)

Act II

- "Saturday Night Fish Fry" (music and lyrics by Ellis Walsh and Jordan)
- "What's the Use of Getting Sober" (music and lyrics by Busby Meyers)
- "If I Had Any Sense (I'd Go Back Home)" (music and lyrics by Rose Marie McCoy)
- "Dad Gum Your Hide Boy" (music and lyrics by Browley Bri)
- "Let the Good Times Roll" (music and lyrics by Fleecie Moore and Sam Theard)
- "Reet, Petite and Gone" (music and lyrics by Spencer Lee and Jordan)
- "Caldonia" (music and lyrics by Fleecie Moore)
- "Ain't Nobody Here But Us Chickens" (music and lyrics by Joan Whitney and Alex Kramer)
- "Don't Let the Sun Catch You Crying" (music and lyrics by Jo Greene)
- "Choo, Choo, Ch'boogie" (music and lyrics by Vaughn Horton, Denver Darling, and Milton Gabler)
- "Look Out Sister" (music and lyrics by Sid Robin and Jordan)
- "Hurry Home" (music and lyrics by Joseph Meyer, Buddy Bernier, and Robert Emmerich)
- "Is You Is or Is You Ain't Ma' Baby" (music and lyrics by Billy Austin and Jordan)
- "Five Guys Named Moe" (reprise)

== Awards and nominations ==
=== Original London production ===
Year	Award	Category	Nominee	Result
1991	Laurence Olivier Award	Best Entertainment		Won
1991	Laurence Olivier Award	Best Actor in a Musical	Paul J. Medford	Nominated
1991	Laurence Olivier Award	Best Director of a Musical	Charles Augins	Nominated
1991	Laurence Olivier Award	Best Theatre Choreographer	Charles Augins	Won

=== Original Broadway production ===
Year	Award	Category	Nominee	Result
1992	Tony Award	Best Musical		Nominated
1992	Tony Award	Best Book of a Musical	Clarke Peters	Nominated
