= Red Dwarf III =

Series of television

- Starring: Chris Barrie; Craig Charles; Danny John-Jules; Hattie Hayridge; Robert Llewellyn
- No. of episodes: 6

Release
- Original network: BBC2
- Original release: 14 November – 19 December 1989

Series chronology
- ← Previous; Red Dwarf II Next → Red Dwarf IV

Red Dwarf III is the third series of the British science fiction sitcom Red Dwarf. It consisted of six episodes and was broadcast on UK television channel BBC2 between 14 November and 19 December 1989.

The series follows the life of technician Dave Lister (Craig Charles), who is the only survivor of an accident on the spaceship Red Dwarf, and the last survivor of the human race, three million years in the future, and his shipmates, a holographic reproduction of his dead bunkmate and boss, Arnold Rimmer (Chris Barrie), a sapient Cat (Danny John-Jules) who is a result of three million years' evolution, and the ship's computer Holly (Hattie Hayridge, replacing Norman Lovett in the same role). They are joined by Robert Llewellyn, who plays the sanitation droid Kryten.

== Production ==
Rob Grant and Doug Naylor, the creators of the show, came on board as producers for the third series of Red Dwarf, which resulted in major changes to the show's look and feel, enabled by more careful use of money.

New sets were designed by incoming production designer Mel Bibby, replacing grey sets and introducing a new Officers' Quarters to serve as Lister and Rimmer's bunkroom. Starbug was introduced as the new secondary spaceship in place of Blue Midget.

The new costume designer, Howard Burden, created a new outfit for Lister including a customised jacket, a new uniform for Rimmer, and new outfits for the Cat vastly increasing his range and repertoire of clothing.

The opening credits sequence was changed and a new, guitar-based, upbeat arrangement of the theme tune played over clips from the series. A new official Red Dwarf logo also appeared at the end of the credit sequence.

The series was directed, as were the first two, by Ed Bye. This was the last series of Red Dwarf to be produced in Manchester, with rehearsals taking place in Acton. Most episodes were filmed before a live studio audience, but "Bodyswap" did not use one, because of the amount of dubbing that would be required.

== Cast ==
Craig Charles, Chris Barrie and Danny John-Jules returned as Lister, Rimmer and Cat, respectively.

Hattie Hayridge replaced Norman Lovett as Holly. Lovett had left the show after a dispute about commuting to the show's rehearsals. Hayridge previously played Holly's female counterpart in the series two episode "Parallel Universe" but still had to audition for the role.

The character of Kryten had originally been intended as a one-off appearance in the series two episode "Kryten", played by David Ross and was brought back at the insistence of Naylor to broaden the story potential. Ross was unable to return as a regular as he was committed to the stage play A Flea in Her Ear. Eventually, Robert Llewellyn, who had been spotted by producer Paul Jackson playing a robot in his Perrier-nominated Edinburgh show Mammon: Robot Born of Woman, was cast in the role. Llewellyn ultimately portrayed Kryten with an accent intended to be North American, but this was not decided until some way into rehearsals, and after pre-filming of a scene for "Bodyswap" that would not make the final cut.

=== Guest cast ===
Regular warm-up man Tony Hawks would appear in "Backwards" as a compere, along with Arthur Smith as a pub manager.

Frances Barber briefly depicts a form taken by the eponymous monster in "Polymorph". Simon Gaffney plays a young Rimmer and Kalli Greenwood plays Rimmer's mother. Gaffney reprises his role in later episode "Timeslides", and they would both reappear in the following series episode "Dimension Jump".

Ruby Wax plays American television personality Blaize Falconburger in "Timeslides". Bye, Wax's husband, convinced Grant and Naylor to rework the part to suit Wax's comedic strengths. The role had been written for Graham Chapman, who died before filming for the episode could begin. A younger Lister is played by Emile Charles, in real life the younger brother to Craig; in an alternate timeline, Lister's wife, Lady Sabrina Mulholland-Jjones, is played by Koo Stark.

A late addition to the script of "The Last Day" was the character of Hudzen-10, played by Gordon Kennedy.

== Plot ==
The final episode of the second series left open a pregnancy plot for Lister. Grant and Naylor had originally planned to resolve this, and reintroduce Kryten, in an episode with the working title of "Dad"; but this script was abandoned. These details along with the recasting of Holly, were explained in a parody of the Star Wars opening crawl at the start of the episode, that scrolled too fast to read.

== Reception ==
Writing in 2015, Den of Geek ranked Red Dwarf III the second best series of the show, saying that "The spectacular one-two punch of '"Marooned' and 'Polymorph' is very nearly enough to push this series into the top spot, and praising the introduction of Kryten and the production design changes; although saying that the execution of "Backwards" and "Bodyswap" could have been better.

Sophie Davies, writing for CultBox in 2017, noted the design changes, saying "If the transition from Red Dwarf II to III happened today, it would probably get called a reboot", and highlighted "Polymorph" as one of the series "most memorable episodes".

== Episodes ==
No. overall	No. in series	Title	Directed by	Written by	Original release date	Prod. code	Viewers (millions)
13	1	"Backwards"	Ed Bye	Rob Grant and Doug Naylor	14 November 1989	3	4.3
With Kryten now a regular member of the crew, Rimmer takes him on a flying lesson in the transport vehicle Starbug. But during the lesson, both find themselves encountering a time hole, which takes them back to Earth in 1993. However, they soon discover everything is backwards, including the flow of time. With little choice, the pair are forced to find work, until Lister and Cat can track them down.
14	2	"Marooned"	Ed Bye	Rob Grant and Doug Naylor	21 November 1989	1	3.9
The crew abandon ship as Holly sees five black holes in the direct flight path of Red Dwarf. In the midst of their evacuation, Rimmer and Lister find themselves marooned on an ice planet after Starbug is struck by a meteoroid. Lister is soon freezing and starving, but the only firewood is his beloved guitar and Rimmer's prized possessions, and the only food left is a can of dog food and a pot noodle, Lister's most hated food.
15	3	"Polymorph"	Ed Bye	Rob Grant and Doug Naylor	28 November 1989	5	4.4
The crew become radically different people after they encounter a polymorph, a genetically engineered shape-changing mutant that feeds on negative emotions—in the crew's case vanity, guilt, anger and fear.
16	4	"Bodyswap"	Ed Bye	Rob Grant and Doug Naylor	5 December 1989	4	4.1
After witnessing Holly perform a mind swap on Lister to tackle an emergency, Rimmer suggests he and Lister undergo the procedure so he can help his bunkmate get healthy through a vigorous exercise regime. However, Rimmer is overtaken with excitement at the prospect of having a physical body again and refuses to give it back to Lister.
17	5	"Timeslides"	Ed Bye	Rob Grant and Doug Naylor	12 December 1989	2	4.4
Kryten is shocked to discover that the developing fluid in Red Dwarf's photo labs has mutated, causing still pictures to come to life. Realizing they can enter any photograph developed in the fluid and effectively time travel anywhere they want, Lister opts to take advantage of this and change his life so he does not get stranded in deep space. Note: Guest stars Ruby Wax, the wife of the series director Ed Bye.
18	6	"The Last Day"	Ed Bye	Rob Grant and Doug Naylor	19 December 1989	6	4.1
Kryten receives word that his replacement Hudzen-10 (Gordon Kennedy) from Diva-Droid International, the company that created both of them, is on its way to Red Dwarf. Lister, annoyed by this, decides the crew should hold a leaving party for him. But the experience Kryten has is so memorable, that he swiftly decides he wants to live, rather than be dismantled and shut down.

== Home media release ==
The series was released in October 1991 on VHS in two volumes, consisting of three episodes each. A remastered edition, with revised visual effects and other changes, was released in 1998. The non-remastered version of the series was released on DVD in 2003.
