= Kryten (Red Dwarf episode) =

- Red Dwarf episode
- Episode no.: Series 2 Episode 1
- Directed by: Ed Bye
- Written by: Rob Grant; Doug Naylor
- Original air date: 6 September 1988

Guest appearances
- David Ross as Kryten; Johanna Hargreaves as Esperanto Woman; Tony Slattery as Android Actor

Episode chronology
| ← Previous "Me²" | Next → "Better Than Life" |
- Red Dwarf II

"Kryten" is the seventh episode from science fiction sitcom Red Dwarf, the first from series two, and was first broadcast on BBC2 on 6 September 1988. Written by Rob Grant and Doug Naylor, and directed by Ed Bye, this episode introduced the mechanoid character Kryten. The episode was re-mastered, along with the rest of the first three series, in 1998.

== Plot ==
Red Dwarf receives a distress call from a crashed spaceship, the Nova 5. When Arnold Rimmer (Chris Barrie), Dave Lister (Craig Charles), and Cat (Danny John-Jules) check the call, they learn that it was made from a service mechanoid called Kryten (David Ross), who reports that all of the crew are dead except for three female crew members. Eager to rescue them but learning from Holly (Norman Lovett) it will take 24 hours for Red Dwarf to reach the crash site, the group boldly spruce themselves for their meeting. Upon boarding the Nova 5, they quickly discover that the women are also dead and that Kryten has been oblivious to this for centuries.

Upon being convinced by the others of this fact, Lister takes pity on Kryten when he questions how he will cope, and decides to bring him back to Red Dwarf. Once on the ship, Rimmer makes use of him to serve primarily himself, much to Lister's disgust. As a result, Lister tries to make Kryten live for himself by having him watch films starring Marlon Brando and James Dean. Although his plan seems not to work, Rimmer is angered when his request for a portrait by Kryten leads him to paint the hologram in an admiral uniform while using a toilet. Kryten takes heart in Lister's tutoring and rebels by insulting Rimmer and ruining his bunk, before asking to borrow Lister's space bike and speeding off to enjoy himself.

== Production ==
The writers realised that the huge Red Dwarf ship on its own did not generate enough story material and to accommodate this new direction for the series a small shuttle ship, Blue Midget, was designed to ferry the crew to and from different locations. The new ship was based on an "every day car", that would go from A to B. Miniature crew models were made to fit inside the small ship and filming was added to footage of the Red Dwarf ship.

It took up to eight hours for David Ross to get into the Kryten make-up

This is the first appearance of Kryten, who wasn't originally intended to become a main character and is not seen again in Series 2. David Ross played Kryten in this episode, but because of scheduling clashes Robert Llewellyn played the character when he became a regular from Series III onwards. The writers had resisted using robot characters as they had considered the practice a sci-fi cliché.

Kryten's appearance was of a mechanical-looking butler with an angular head. The head mask had provided the most problems to the make up and effects team. Prosthetic foam originally used for the mask kept falling apart and eventually a latex piece was produced. Initially it had taken David Ross up to eight hours to get into the full Kryten make-up. To make matters worse, Ross suffered from claustrophobia.

Johanna Hargreaves appeared as the Esperanto teacher and Tony Slattery voiced an android actor in the Androids television show.

Grant and Naylor's script for the episode was collected in the 1995 book Son of Soup.

== Cultural references ==
Howard Goodall wrote the Androids theme tune with the Australian soap opera Neighbours in mind. The song, containing similar lyrics and tune, was trimmed down due to time constraints.

Lister insists that Kryten should watch classic rebel films like The Wild One, Rebel Without a Cause and Easy Rider, hoping that the films, including the Marlon Brando rebel speech, would help the mechanoid break his servile programming. Kryten quotes Marlon Brando in the last line of the episode: Rimmer asks, "What are you rebelling against?" and Kryten replies in an affected voice, "What d'ya got?"

== Reception ==
The episode was originally broadcast on the British television channel BBC2 on 6 September 1988, to average viewing ratings.

A 1992 Red Dwarf Magazine readers' poll placed it at 22nd of the then 30 episodes, with 1.4% of the votes. This ranked it the lowest of Series 2's episodes.

One later reviewer stated that "the episode would be a brilliant one if Kryten weren't a little too C3PO-ish."

Reviewing the episode for CultBox in 2017, Sophie Davies said that although the episode had not previously been a favourite of hers, she "found it hugely enjoyable", and that "Having just rewatched series one, it is noticeable that "Kryten" has a new energy and is more laugh-out-loud funny than what came before."

The character of Kryten would return as a regular in Red Dwarf III, played by Robert Llewellyn.

== Remastering ==
The remastering of Series I to III was carried out during the late 1990s. Changes throughout the series included replacement of the opening credits, giving the picture a colour grade and filmising, computer generated special effects of Red Dwarf and many more visual and audio enhancements. Changes specific to "Kryten" include a new ending with Kryten flying Lister's space bike off into distant space away from Red Dwarf.

== See also ==
- Infinity Welcomes Careful Drivers, the first Red Dwarf novel, features an expanded version of events from this episode and builds on the backstory.
- "Backwards", the Series III episode when Kryten begins appearing as a main character.
