= Better Than Life (Red Dwarf episode) =

- Red Dwarf episode
- Episode no.: Series 2 Episode 2
- Directed by: Ed Bye
- Written by: Rob Grant; Doug Naylor
- Original air date: 13 September 1988

Guest appearances
- John Abineri as Rimmer's Dad; Debbie Ash as Marilyn Monroe; Jeremy Austin as Rathbone (autograph seeker); Nigel Carrivick as The Captain; Tony Hawks as The Guide; Judy Hawkins as McGruder; Tina Jenkins as The Newsreader; Ron Pember as The Taxman; Gordon Salkilld as Gordon

Episode chronology
← Previous "Kryten"	Next → "Thanks for the Memory"
- Red Dwarf II

"Better Than Life" is the second episode from Red Dwarf series two and the eighth in the series run.

It was first broadcast on BBC2 on 13 September 1988. Written by Rob Grant and Doug Naylor, and directed by Ed Bye, this episode introduces the total immersion video game "Better Than Life", which features in both the first and second Red Dwarf novels.

== Plot ==
A post pod for Red Dwarf finally reaches the ship three million years late and is brought on board by Holly. As the group check through it, they find many items, including a square cassette copy of Friday the 13th part 1649, and a total immersion virtual reality game called "Better Than Life". Arnold Rimmer finds a letter addressed to him detailing that his father is dead. Despite knowing that he and rest of humanity are long dead, seeing the news in writing from his mother upsets him. Although Rimmer admits he loathed him due to his strict requirements for his children to get into the Space Corps to make up for his own failure to join, he also points out that he looked up to him. Seeing him depressed, Dave Lister and the Cat invite him to join them within Better Than Life. Within the game, the group finds that it makes their deepest desires come true – Cat has Marilyn Monroe and a mermaid as girlfriends; Lister has wealth, eating caviar-covered vindaloo and playing golf; while Rimmer, with a physical form, leads an admiral's life with drinks, parties, and a wonderful wife.

However, things start to go wrong when Rimmer sees his father in the game and is insulted by him, soon bringing out his feelings of inadequacy, and causing his neurotic mind to subconsciously reject the nice things happening to him, causing him to live a wrecked life with an unsympathetic Outland Revenue Collector threatening to harm him over a large debt he has. Rimmer's mind soon affects everyone else's fun, leaving them suffering anguish as well, before the game comes to an end. Once back on Red Dwarf, Rimmer is called out for his "diseased brain" and presumes his life will never be good. Almost suddenly, he finds a letter informing him he passed astro-navigation examination, but his joy is short-lived when he and the others find the tax collector suddenly turning up, revealing that they are still in the game.

== Production ==
After looking back at the first series the writers, Grant and Naylor, realised that they needed to expand on Rimmer's background and explore his character. To achieve this the Rimmer family was written into the episode. There were his three high-flying brothers, his distant mother and psychotic father. His father appeared in the "Better Than Life" scenario, played by John Abineri.

A dull cold day in Rhyl used for the sunny landscape of the 'Better Than Life' scenario

For the first time since the series began, filming of several scenes took place on location. To film the "Better Than Life" scenarios the crew went to locations including a seaside landscape in Rhyl and Sacha's Hotel in Manchester. The same hotel would later hold science fiction conventions for Star Trek, Space: 1999 and Doctor Who. The seaside beach location caused a headache as the weather was dull and visibly cold. One scene proved so problematic – when they were meant to be sunbathing on the "paradise-like" beach, Craig Charles and Danny John-Jules could not stop shivering – that the scenes were re-written and re-shot as on a golf course. The golf course scenes also looked cold, but director Ed Bye convinced the crew that it was okay and that the sunshine could be put in during the edit. However, it couldn't be made to look sunny and it wasn't until the episode was remastered that the sunshine was finally seen.

Other "Better Than Life" appearances were made by Ron Pember, who played the Taxman, Debbie Ash as Marilyn Monroe and Judy Hawkins as Yvonne McGruder. Tony Hawks, who had appeared in the Red Dwarf I episode "Future Echoes", returned to the series to play the 'Better Than Life' game guide. Gordon Salkilld appeared as computer Gordon, the chess email gaming chum of Holly.

== Reception ==
The episode was originally broadcast on the British television channel BBC2 on 13 September 1988.

Reviewing the episode for 2017 for CultBox, Sophie Davies said that "It's a brilliant concept that gives rise to some fine-but-not-brilliant gags", but stating that "What really takes the episode to another level is Rimmer. [...] When he effectively ruins the game by being unable to imagine nice things for himself, we're left feeling more pity than frustration."

Grant and Naylor used the plot for their first and second novels – Infinity Welcomes Careful Drivers ended on a cliffhanger when the crew entered the game and the majority of the second novel, Better Than Life, followed on from there.

== See also ==
- Simulated reality
