= Backwards (Red Dwarf episode) =

- Red Dwarf episode
- Episode no.: Series 3 Episode 1
- Directed by: Ed Bye
- Written by: Rob Grant & Doug Naylor
- Original air date: 14 November 1989

Guest appearances
- Maria Friedman as Waitress; Tony Hawks as Compere; Anna Palmer as Customer; Arthur Smith as Pub Manager

Episode chronology
← Previous "Parallel Universe"	Next → "Marooned"
- Red Dwarf III

"Backwards" is the first episode of the third series of the British science fiction sitcom Red Dwarf and the thirteenth episode in the series overall. It premiered on the British television channel BBC2 on 14 November 1989 and was written by Rob Grant and Doug Naylor, and directed by Ed Bye.

The episode follows the crew as they travel to an alternate Earth where time runs backwards.

The episode marks the first regular appearances of Robert Llewellyn's Kryten, Hattie Hayridge's version of Holly, the new spaceship Starbug, better production values, and a change in direction of story themes that would cement the show's cult status. The story was later reformulated as a novel of the same name. The episode was remastered, along with the rest of the first three series, in 1998.

== Plot ==
An opening crawl explains that following the events of "Parallel Universe", Dave Lister (Craig Charles) gave birth to twins who had to be sent back to the universe of their origin because of his universe's physical laws resulting in them rapidly aging. At the same time, the ship's computer Holly underwent a transformation to become his alternate universe counterpart Hilly (Hattie Hayridge) whom he fell madly in love with, while the others came across the broken pieces of the mechanoid Kryten (Robert Llewellyn), after he crashed on an asteroid while riding Lister's space bike, leading to Lister having to salvage and rebuild him, consequentially causing him to lose his old personality.

In the episode proper, Arnold Rimmer (Chris Barrie) takes Kryten out for a piloting test with transport vessel Starbug 1, only for the pair to be sucked into a time hole and crash-land on a planet. When the two see a sign written backwards and people performing actions and speaking backwards, Holly concludes they are on Earth in the distant future where time is now running backwards.

Kryten and Rimmer are initially disgusted by the "backwards" behaviour of people, but find work as a novelty act "The Sensational Reverse Brothers", who perform basic actions forwards.

Lister and Cat (Danny John-Jules) finally track them down three weeks later in Starbug 2, but upon arriving, Lister is confused by the fact he has arrived with a feeling of cracked ribs and a black eye. Lister and Cat, after arriving, initially assume that they are in Bulgaria, and only later realise they're in England and everything is backwards. Having found Rimmer and Kryten enjoying themselves in their new jobs, they fail to convince the pair to leave. When they are fired for starting a fight, Kryten realises it is about to happen in reverse. The fight results in Lister's injuries being healed. Realising they cannot stay, Kryten and Rimmer agree to return to their time with the others, a decision reinforced by Cat's horrifying discovery of what happens to someone trying to relieve themselves in reverse.

== Writing ==
The Series III pre-credits scroll detailing the back story was originally intended to be an episode in its own right. Titled "Dad", the episode would have tied the loose ends from series two's "Parallel Universe" where Lister would have given birth to the twins and given them back to the parallel universe Lister version. Grant and Naylor had partially written the script but they decided to scrap the idea as they felt it to be unfunny and potentially offensive to women.

Grant and Naylor's script for the episode was collected in the 1995 book Son of Soup.

== Design ==
Locations in and around Manchester were used for the episode. This picture depicts the road sign to 'Nodnol 871 Selim' which in reverse reads 'London 178 Miles'.

With Rob Grant and Doug Naylor directly involved with the third series, under their Grant Naylor Productions team, they radically changed the look of the show. The opening credits sequence sported a new rock guitar version of the Red Dwarf theme tune playing over clips from the series. The opening sequence ends with the first appearance of the official logo of the show which was designed by DeWinters. Mel Bibby had also come on board the crew and re-designed the sets. His inspiration from Ridley Scott's Alien film clearly shown in the new set's murky and run-down feel.

Costumes were overhauled as well, with costume designer Howard Burden bringing in a stylish new look to the crew. Lister's jacket outfit, having been designed with his art school background in mind, included a voluptuous woman riding a rocket on the back. This woman had indeed been intended to be Wilma Flintstone but was changed to a generic looking female once the legality of using The Flintstones image arose. Rimmer's tunic uniform served as implying his devotion to duty as well as his hologrammatic status. While the Cat's wardrobe reached new heights in the fashion stakes, Kryten's appearance was based on the Series II look but produced more successfully.

== Effects ==
Starbug was introduced as the new spaceship in place of Blue Midget. Grant and Naylor felt that Blue Midget did not work well set-wise because of size constraints so they requested that Peter Wragg, and his visual effects team, come up with a design for another ship. The final design, initially called White Midget, was shown to Grant and Naylor and they liked it, but they thought it looked more like a bug so settled on the name Starbug.

== Production ==
Many of the location scenes for "Backwards" were filmed in and around Manchester. The lake and woodland scenes were filmed in Tatton Park. Series creator and writer Rob Grant can be seen standing on the street with sunglasses smoking a cigarette backwards.

Effects also featured more heavily in the new series. The barroom brawl with plenty of fake glass featured a stunt double hurling through a window on the set. Bluescreen backgrounds were used for the actors to film against which was then merged with the cloaked Starbug location footage. Close-up shots were merely filmed on top of a raised platform with only the sky visible in the background.

== Casting ==
The character of Kryten was originally intended as a one-off appearance in the series-two episode "Kryten". The character returned mainly to expand the story potential as Lister was the only person who could really do anything; Rimmer, a hologram, could not touch anything, the Cat could not be bothered to touch anything, and Holly was incompetent and immobile. The series was becoming difficult to write for, so at the insistence of Naylor, Kryten returned to complete the team.

Grant and Naylor had approached David Ross with the intention of bringing him back to play the regular role of Kryten. Ross was in the stage play A Flea in Her Ear and thus not available, so they went to see Robert Llewellyn at the advice of Paul Jackson. Llewellyn was in a stage show called Mammon: Robot Born of a Woman, playing a robot. They saw his performance and were impressed.

"Backwards" world guest stars includes Maria Friedman as the Waitress, Tony Hawks as a Compere, Anna Palmer as a Customer in Cafe and Arthur Smith as the Pub Manager.

== Reception ==
The episode was originally broadcast on the British television channel BBC2 on 14 November 1989. It had the highest viewership of any Red Dwarf episode then broadcast.

Reviewing the episode for The Stage, Bill McCoid said that the "series looks like the best yet", and that the show was a "superior situation comedy which is off the wall, on the ball, and ahead of its time in more ways than one." Patrick Stoddart writing in the Sunday Times said that it was a "marvellously daft idea", continuing that the show was now "confident comedy grown almost to the shoulders of Hitchhiker's Guide to the Galaxy.

The Red Dwarf Smegazine readers poll listed the episode at number four of the 30 then-existing episodes, with 7.1% of the votes.

Although Series III was received well as a whole, "Backwards" was picked out as a highlight. One review described it as "a particularly inspired episode, making brilliant use of video tricks to enhance the intricate details of the storyline." Sci-Fi Dimensions described it as the best episode of the series, and said that "admittedly, this episode is inconsistent in its treatment of the backwards principles, but even the inconsistencies are part of the fun!"

In 2017 Sophie Davies, writing for CultBox said that "Unfortunately most of the episode is a bit one-note". In his 2024 book on the series Tom Salinsky agreed, saying that although there was good character work at the start of the episode, that "after those earlier establishing scenes, very quickly we get to the point where these could be any four guys and it's only the world they're in that is supposed to be interesting or funny."

== Remastering ==
"Backwards" was remastered in 1997 to include an animated shot of the ejected Rimmer has been added to the opening scene with Starbug with scream and thump sounds enhanced. Starbug's sounds have been remixed and enhanced throughout. A new time-hole tunnel sequence has been added when Starbug travels through it. POV landscape shots have been added as Starbug enters the backwards Earth. Fire elements and sound effects have been added to the Starbug crash. The café exterior has been added as a transitional shot. The cloaking Starbug has been added to the existing empty shot of Lister and Cat arriving on 'backwards' Earth. The end credit sequence has been flipped and reads in reverse.

== See also ==
- Backwards (novel), the fourth Red Dwarf novel which uses the Backwards theme for most of the plot.
- Time loop
- Time travel
