= Nadia Cattouse =

British actress and singer (1924–2024)

- Born: Nadia Evadne Cattouse; 2 November 1924; Belize City, British Honduras
- Died: 29 October 2024 (aged 99); London, England
- Other name: Eva Dayne
- Education: London School of Economics
- Occupations: Actress; singer
- Years active: 1954–1983 (acting)
- Spouse: David Lindup (m. 1958; died 1992)
- Children: 2, including Mike Lindup

Nadia Evadne Cattouse (2 November 1924 – 29 October 2024) was a British actress and singer. She began her onscreen acting career in 1954 and was best known for her roles in many British television programmes, including Angels, Play for Today, Crown Court, Within These Walls, Dixon of Dock Green and Johnny Jarvis.

Nadia composed, arranged, and wrote several songs under the nom de plume of Eva Dayne.

== Biography ==
=== Early life and career ===
Nadia Evadne Cattouse was born in Belize City on 2 November 1924. Her father, Albert Cattouse, was a civil servant who became Deputy Prime Minister of British Honduras, and her mother, Kathleen Fairweather Cattouse, was an educator.

In 1943, during the Second World War, Nadia Cattouse came to Britain as a volunteer. She was trained in Edinburgh, Scotland, as a signals operator. She also became a part-time physical training instructor with the Auxiliary Territorial Service (ATS). She subsequently attended teacher training college in Glasgow, and after qualifying she returned to British Honduras, where she was headmistress of a Mission school and lectured on infant education at Teachers' Training College and summer courses. She returned to Britain in 1951 and studied Social Sciences at the London School of Economics, acting and singing to pay her way through college.

Cattouse began her television career in 1954. She appeared in two prize-winning television productions, Freedom Road: Songs of Negro Protest (1964) and There I Go, and appeared on stage as Felicity in Jean Genet′s The Blacks. Her notable recordings as a folk singer included "Long Time Boy" and "Red and Green Christmas".

As a singer in the 1960s she performed at Les Cousins folk and blues club in Greek Street, London, and appeared in television programmes including the BBC's Sing Along and Hootenanny. On the folk scene, she was a contemporary of Julie Felix and Fairport Convention, and was described by Melody Maker as "one of the giants of the folk-song revival in Britain". With Robin Hall and Jimmie Macgregor she made Songs of Grief & Glory in 1967. Her album Earth Mother (1970) was partly recorded at the 1969 Edinburgh Festival. Among other compilations, Cattouse featured on Cult Cargo: Belize City Boil Up (2005), singing "Long Time Boy", and on the 1972 album Club Folk 2 (Peg Records PS3), singing "B. C. People" and "All Around My Grandmother's Floor". Nadia recorded several songs under the pen name Eva Dayne and also used this name on songs she adapted and arranged.

Cattouse was known for her acting roles in many British television programmes including Angels, Within These Walls, Play for Today, Crown Court, Dixon of Dock Green and Johnny Jarvis.

=== Personal life and death ===
Cattouse married David Lindup (1928–1992), an arranger-composer with John Dankworth's orchestra, in 1958. The couple had two children and their son Mike Lindup is the keyboard player of the jazz-funk new wave band Level 42. The couple divorced in the mid-'60s and in 1969 Cattouse married Bryan Webb.

Cattouse died in London on 29 October 2024, just days before she would have turned 100. Tribute was paid to her on the BBC Radio 4 programme Last Word, for which her son Mike Lindup was interviewed.

== Award ==
- September 2009, Meritorious Service Award from the Government of Belize, "in recognition of her advancement of social, cultural, and political awareness among Belizeans and other Caribbean people in the UK".

== Selected discography ==
=== Albums ===
- Nadia Cattouse (Reality, 1966)

Side A:

- A1: Nobody's Business. Adapted and arranged by Eva Dayne
- A2: Turn Around by – Malvina Reynolds
- A3: Skipping And Jumping by – David Campbell
- A4: Please written-By – Eva Dayne
- A5: People With Bad Mind Trad (traditional) music arranged by Eva Dayne
- A6: Budbank Wedding by – Gerald Rhaburn
- A7: Sorrow by – Eva Dayne
- A8: Fayo, traditional music

Side B:

- B1: Judas And Mary by – Sydney Carter
- B2: Brown Girl In The Ring adapted and arranged by – Eva Dayne
- B3: The Way Of The World by – David Campbell*
- B4: Beautiful Barbados by – Emile Strakr
- B5: That's What I'd Like To Do by – Eva Dayne
- B6: Long Time Boy by – Eva Dayne
- B7: Don't Think Twice by – Bob Dylan
- B8: Go From My Window arranged By – David Campbell, traditional music
- Earth Mother (RCA International, 1970)

=== Singles ===
- "The Boy Without a Heart" / "Long Time, Boy" (1961)
- "Run Joe" / "Bahaman Lullaby" (1961)
- "Port Mahon" / "A Little More Oil" (1965)
- "Beautiful Barbados" / "Turn Around" (Reality / RE 503)
- "It's Hard to See" / "Desert Sand" (LIV/SP/93)

=== Compilations ===
- Edinburgh Folk Festival Vol. 1 (1963)
- Edinburgh Folk Festival Vol. 2 (1964)
- Folk Festival (1964)
- Freedom Road: Songs of Negro Protest (Fontana, 1964)
- Songs from ABC Television's "Hallelujah" (Fontana, 1966)
- Songs Of Grief And Glory" (Fontana, 1967)
- 49 Greek Street (RCA / RCA SF8118, 1970; RCA / JASKCD193, 2007)
- Club Folk Volume 1 (Peg, 1972)
- Club Folk Volume 2 (Peg, 1972)
- Cult Cargo: Belize City Boil Up (Numero, 2005)
