= Sabra Williams =

British actress and presenter

Sabra Williams BEM
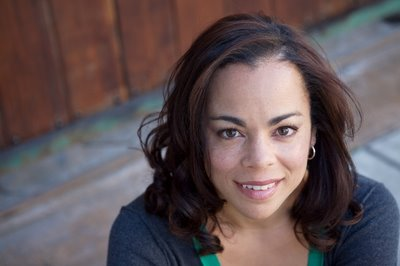
- Born: Sabra Williams; London, England
- Occupations: Actress and presenter

Sabra Williams, BEM is a British actress and presenter.

== Family ==
Williams was born in London to parents of British, Russian, Romanian, Guyanese and Carib descent.

== Early career ==
Williams started performing at the age of three and became a professional dancer and actress. She starred in several British films, including 'Steffi' in Thin Ice with Ian McKellen and James Dreyfuss, and was a regular face in many British television series including an appearance as Lise Yates in episode "Thanks for the Memory" of the sci-fi comedy, Red Dwarf.

== Presenter ==
Williams was cast at a very young age as a lead presenter/actress in the top rated live TV show, Ghost Train . After numerous shows and engagements, including the position of Moderator for BAFTA, WGA and SAG, Williams most recently hosted On The Bench on Setanta Sports.

== Los Angeles ==
Williams has been a member of the Actors' Gang (Artistic Dir.Tim Robbins), leading in several shows including Molière's Tartuffe and appeared in the ABC series, In Justice, playing Sondra, Kyle MacLachlan's love interest, Mission: Impossible III opposite Tom Cruise as 'Annie Miller', and Nip/Tuck among other notable roles.
