= Charles Augins =

American actor and choreographer (1943–2025)

Charles Augins (September 17, 1943 – July 19, 2025) was an American actor, dancer and choreographer in stage and film.

== Life and career ==
Cover art for "Baby I Need Your Loving"

A native of Virginia, in 1981 Augins choreographed Ray Davies' first musical Chorus Girls, at the Theatre Royal Stratford East, London, as well as appearing in Blake's 7 the same year. He won the Laurence Olivier Award for Best Theatre Choreographer in 1991 for Five Guys Named Moe. He had a small role in Revenge of the Pink Panther as "Vic Vancouver". He is probably best known to television audiences for playing Queeg 500 in the Red Dwarf episode "Queeg". He was also the choreographer for the Red Dwarf "Tongue Tied" dance scene in the episode "Parallel Universe". He choreographed for the movie Labyrinth, as well as voicing one of the puppets. In 1989 he appeared as himself in the Jeff Goldblum comedy film The Tall Guy, directed by Mel Smith.

In addition, he worked as a singer, performing backing vocals on records by artists such as Amii Stewart and releasing a solo single, a cover of the Holland–Dozier–Holland composition "Baby I Need Your Loving" in 1982.

He served as Chair of the Dance Department of Duke Ellington School of the Arts in Washington DC.

Augins died July 19, 2025, at the age of 81.
