= Stasis Leak =

- Red Dwarf episode
- Episode no.: Series 2 Episode 4
- Directed by: Ed Bye
- Written by: Rob Grant; Doug Naylor
- Original air date: 27 September 1988

Guest appearances
- Morwenna Banks as The Lift Hostess; Sophie Doherty as Kochanski's Room Mate; C P Grogan as Kristine Kochanski; Richard Hainsworth as The Medical Orderly; Tony Hawks as The Suitcase; Mac McDonald as Captain Hollister; Mark Williams as Petersen

Episode chronology
← Previous "Thanks for the Memory"	Next → "Queeg"
- Red Dwarf II

"Stasis Leak" is the fourth episode of the science fiction sitcom Red Dwarf series two and tenth in the series run.

It premiered on the British television channel BBC2 on 27 September 1988. The episode was written by Rob Grant and Doug Naylor, and directed by Ed Bye and in it the crew travels back in time, before the accident had wiped out the crew of Red Dwarf. The episode was remastered, along with the rest of the first three series, in 1998.

== Plot ==
Arnold Rimmer (Chris Barrie) becomes annoyed when he finds Dave Lister (Craig Charles) reading his diary. Lister reveals he has found a wedding photo in the quarters of Kristine Kochanski (Clare Grogan), in which he was her groom, and, combining this with an anecdote in Rimmer's diary involving the phrase "stasis leak", speculates that time travel may be involved. The group traces the stasis leak and find it is a passageway to the past, to around three weeks before the cadmium II accident that wiped out the crew. They discover that the stasis leak prevents anything from the past being brought to the present but decide to change things for the better.

Rimmer tries to find his past self and warn him of the upcoming accident, thus hoping he will get into the ship's other second stasis booth, and avoid dying. Lister tracks Kochanski down to a hotel, hoping to save her, but finds she is already married to his future self from five years hence. When they rejoin Rimmer, they find him unsuccessfully trying to convince his younger self he is real. When future Lister and Kochanski arrive alongside future Rimmer, the matter becomes so complicated that past Rimmer decides to accept it only as a hallucination and asks them all to leave him alone.

== Production ==
Following positive fan reactions to the science-fiction elements within the "Future Echoes" episode of Series 1, Grant and Naylor planned another sci-fi heavy story.

The Midland Hotel, Manchester was used as "The Ganymede Holiday Inn" where Lister and the Cat search for Kochanski. Grogan was not available for the final scene, set in Rimmer and Lister's bunk room, assistant floor manager Dona DiStefano stepped in to double as Kochanski, wearing a large hat to disguise the fact.

Returning pre-accident crew members include Mac McDonald as Captain Hollister, C. P. Grogan as Kochanski, Mark Williams as Petersen, and Sophie Doherty as Kochanski's friend. Morwenna Banks appears as the on-screen Lift Hostess, while Tony Hawks makes a guest appearance as the talking suitcase.

== Reception ==
The episode was originally broadcast on the British television channel BBC2 on 4 October 1988.

Writing in 2017 for CultBox, Sophie Davies highlighted the Chris Barrie's performance as Rimmer and stated that "[he] is on top form in this episode, delivering big laughs while playing drunk [...] and also managing to build sympathy for a previously quite unsympathetic character."

Fans considered the episode to be one of the better efforts from Series II, coming at 12th place overall in a Red Dwarf Smegazine readers' poll with 3.3% of the votes.

== Remastering ==
The remastering of Series I to III was carried out during the late 1990s. Changes throughout the series included replacement of the opening credits, giving the picture a colour grade and filmising, computer generated special effects of Red Dwarf and many more visual and audio enhancements.

Changes made specific to "Stasis Leak" include the caption "Three million years earlier" has been removed from the opening flashback scenes. The stasis leak sound effects have been added. The split-screen wipe — with the older Lister shutting the door on his younger self — has been re-done frame by frame to remove previous errors.
