= Queeg (Red Dwarf) =

- Red Dwarf episode
- Episode no.: Series 2 Episode 5
- Directed by: Ed Bye
- Written by: Rob Grant; Doug Naylor
- Original air date: 4 October 1988

Guest appearance
- Charles Augins as Queeg

Episode chronology
← Previous "Stasis Leak"	Next → "Parallel Universe"
- Red Dwarf II

"Queeg" is the fifth episode of science fiction sitcom Red Dwarf series two and the eleventh in the series run.

It premiered on the British television channel BBC2 on 4 October 1988 and was written by Rob Grant and Doug Naylor, and directed by Ed Bye. The plot features a backup computer named Queeg that replaces Holly. The episode was remastered, along with the rest of the first three series, in 1998.

== Plot ==
After Red Dwarf survives an impact from an asteroid, and Dave Lister (Craig Charles) narrowly avoids being killed repairing the damage it did to the Hologram Simulation Suite, he, Arnold Rimmer (Chris Barrie) and Cat (Danny John-Jules) question how safe they are with the assistance of the ship's computer, Holly (Norman Lovett). His lack of intelligence, despite the fact he is supposed to have an IQ of 6,000, and his increasing mistakes soon irritate them. In response, the pair find Holly's computer screens being occupied by a mysterious face they haven't seen before. The face identifies itself as Queeg 500 (Charles Augins), the ship's back-up computer, and announces that it is retiring Holly for his gross negligence leading to the endangerment of the ship's personnel. As a result, Queeg assumes control and demotes Holly to the ship's night watchman.

The group are pleased at the intelligence and efficiency of the new computer, but soon regret the change when Rimmer is made to wake up early and do strenuous exercises, and Lister and Cat are forced to clean the ship in order to acquire any food. Finally understanding how lenient Holly was towards them, the group beg him to return. Holly agrees and issues a challenge to Queeg, leading both to compete in a game of chess to determine who runs Red Dwarf and who is erased. Queeg wins easily and announces Holly will be erased. Lister, Rimmer and Cat prepare themselves for Holly's erasure and Queeg's rule. However, to their surprise and exasperation, Holly reveals himself to have been Queeg all along, having played a prank on the group so that they could learn to appreciate what they have.

== Production ==
Craig Charles carrying out his own stunt for the episode

The script was nearing completion when the writers were having problems thinking of a satisfactory ending. Eventually Rob Grant came up with the 2001: A Space Odyssey spoof of Holly singing as he gets erased, only reveal that it is an April Fool.

Craig Charles did the stunt in the first scene himself. To achieve the effect of flying up and over the exploding console, Charles bounced off a small trampoline—that was out of shot—and this was matched up to the earlier establishing shot.

Charles Augins had known Danny John-Jules for years, and had originally been brought in to choreograph the opening dance routine in the next episode "Parallel Universe".

== Cultural references ==
The theme tune from High Noon plays as Holly goes off to face his showdown with Queeg.

Queeg is named after Captain Queeg from The Caine Mutiny, but Holly's "This is mutiny, Mr Queeg" quote is from Mutiny on the Bounty.

The song Holly begins to sing as he is erased is "Goodbye to Love" by The Carpenters from their 1972 album A Song for You.

== Reception ==
The episode was originally broadcast on the British television channel BBC2 on 4 October 1988.

Norman Lovett, who played Holly, stated, in the Series II documentary It's Cold Outside, that the episode was one of his favourites. It came in 9th place in a Red Dwarf Smegazine readers' poll with 4.4% of the overall votes.

Reviewing the episode for CultBox in 2017 Sophie Davies said that "the final reveal of 'Queeg never existed, it was me all along' is up there as one of Red Dwarf’s best moments."

== Remastering ==
The remastering of Series I to III was carried out during the late 1990s. Changes throughout the series included replacement of the opening credits, giving the picture a colour grade and filmising, computer generated special effects of Red Dwarf and many more visual and audio enhancements. Changes made specific to "Queeg" include sound effects on the meteor impact have been enhanced. Video and sound effects have been added to the original live-action footage of Rimmer's hologrammatic form malfunctioning.
