= Johanna Hargreaves =

British television actress (born 1963)

- Born: 18 June 1963 (age 61); England
- Occupation: Actress
- Years active: 1980–present

Johanna Hargreaves (born 18 June 1963) is a British television actress who has been active since 1980, best known for playing "Stella" in the 1983 teenage drama Johnny Jarvis and "Linda Jordan" in the 1992 police drama Between the Lines.

== Selected filmography ==
- Sense & Sensibility (2008) – Servant
- Doctors (2002) – Joy Beeching
- The Bill (1990–1998) – Julie Watson
- No Bananas (1996) – Phyllis Slater
- Between the Lines (1992) – Linda Jordan
- Casualty (1986–1990) – Debbie Bannister
- Bergerac (1990) – June Marks
- Red Dwarf (1988) – Esperanto Woman
- Slinger's Day (1986) – Marilyn
- A Little Princess (1986) – Henrietta
- Hazard of Hearts (1987) – Young Maid
- Filthy Rich & Catflap (1987) – Cindy (1 episode, 1987)
- Shine on Harvey Moon (1985) – Hilda
- Tenko (1984) – Cherry
- The Glory Boys (1984) – Wendy
- Johnny Jarvis (1983) – Stella
- Take the High Road (1980) – Sandra Blair
