= Gordon Salkilld =

British actor (1927–2003)

Gordon Salkilld (9 May 1927 – 14 May 2003) was an English supporting actor best known for his portrayal of carpenter Jack Wood in the 1970s BBC cult series Survivors. He also gained fame in Red Dwarf: series 2, episode 2 as Gordon—the incredibly intelligent computer aboard the S.S. F Scott Fitzgerald, who is involved in a chess game with Holly—a part specially written for him by Rob Grant and Doug Naylor, with whom he had previously worked on the Radio 4 series Wrinkles, and as Petty Officer Parker in BBC children's series The Doombolt Chase.

He also made appearances in Thriller; episode 'The Double Kill' (1975), A Touch of Frost, A Very Peculiar Practice, Jeeves and Wooster, Shelley, Ever Decreasing Circles, Juliet Bravo, Never the Twain and Only Fools and Horses.

Salkilld was active on the stage. He directed and starred in a production of Tom Stoppard's After Magritte at the Prince of Wales, Wimbledon in 1974.

He appeared on the stage in a production of Puss in Boots at Tunbridge Wells in 1974; a reviewer wrote that Salkilld "was an amusing Dame".

== Filmography ==
Year	Title	Role	Notes
1978	The Playbirds	Police Photographer	
1979	A Horse Called Jester	Blaine	
1991	Close My Eyes	Hotel Porter	
1991	Under Suspicion	Prison Governor	
