= Hattie Hayridge =

British comedian and actress

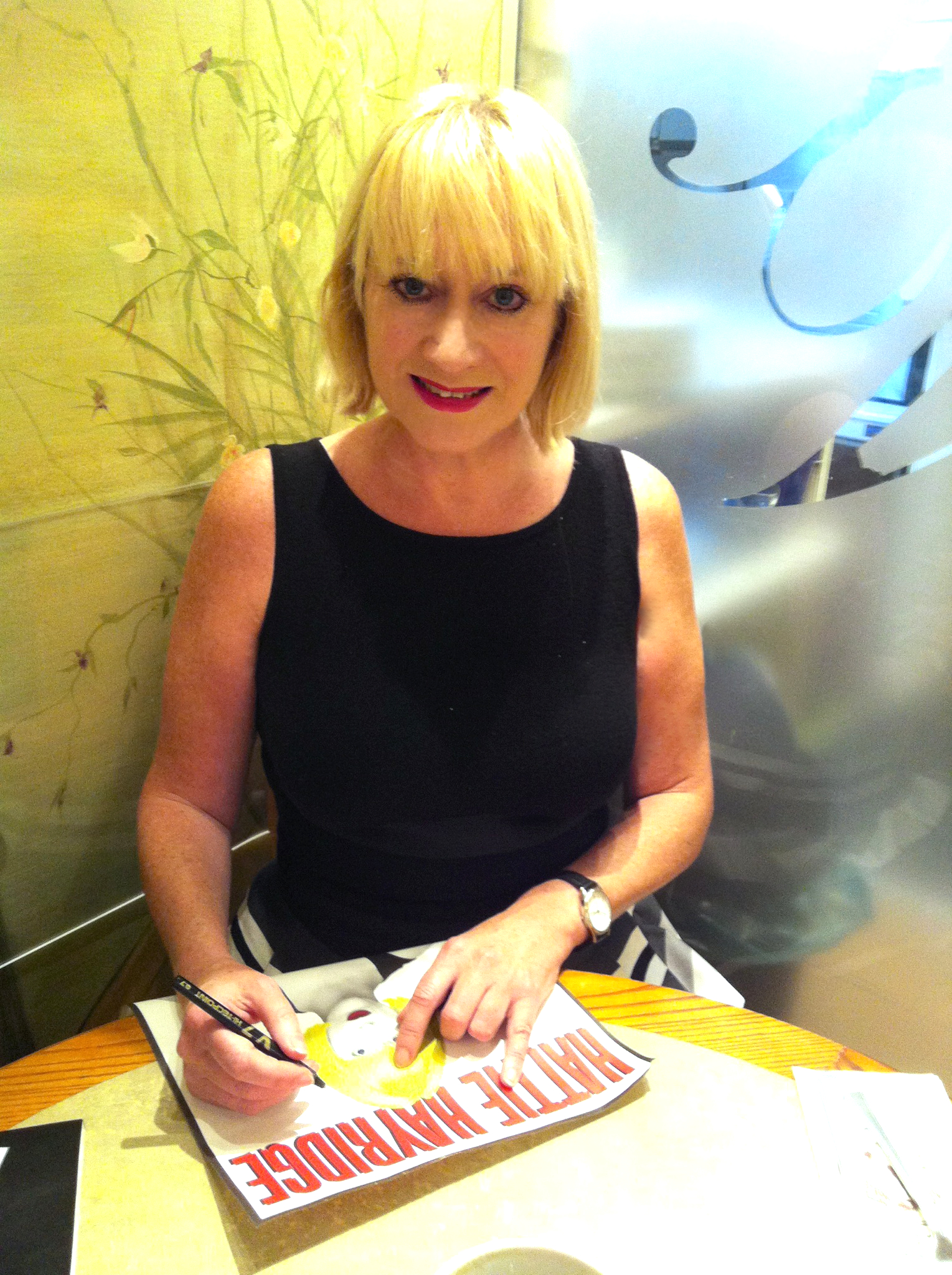
- Hayridge signing autographs in 2014
- Born: Middlesex, England
- Education: University of Sussex
- Occupations: Comedian, actress
- Years active: 1986–present
- Known for: Red Dwarf

Hattie Hayridge is a British comedian and actress, best known for the role of Holly in Red Dwarf during the third, fourth and fifth series. She was described as a "cult figure in a beloved sit-com" by The List in 2007.

== Career ==
Hayridge was a part of the late-1980s/early-'90s wave of alternative comedians on the British comedy circuit, appearing alongside Lee Evans, Jack Dee, Julian Clary and Paul Merton, amongst others. Julian Hall of The Independent later commented in August 2007, "Boom there it is, the deceptive and surprising edge for which she is renowned and applauded by so many of her fellow-comics."

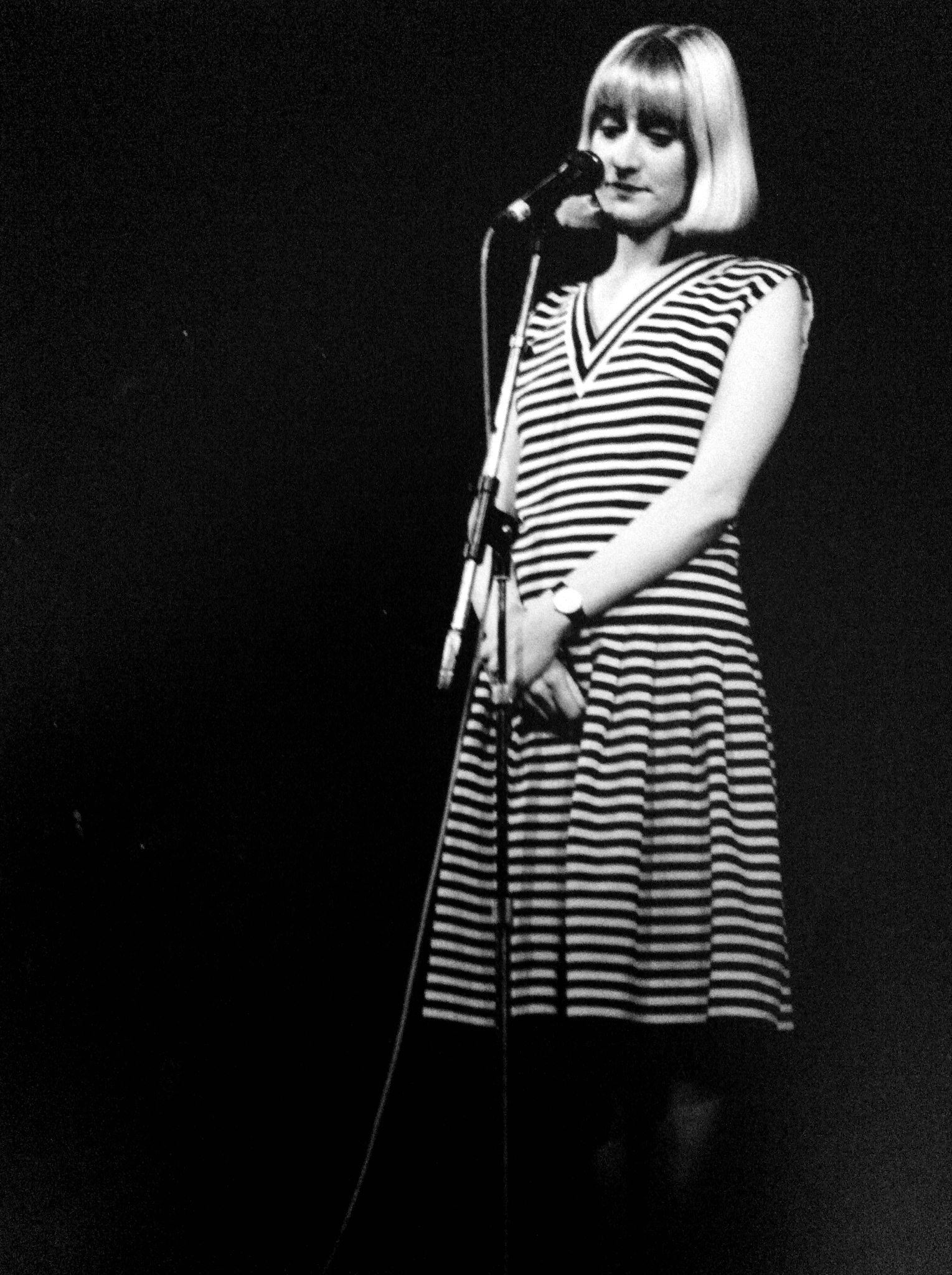
Hayridge at the 1988 Comedy Festival

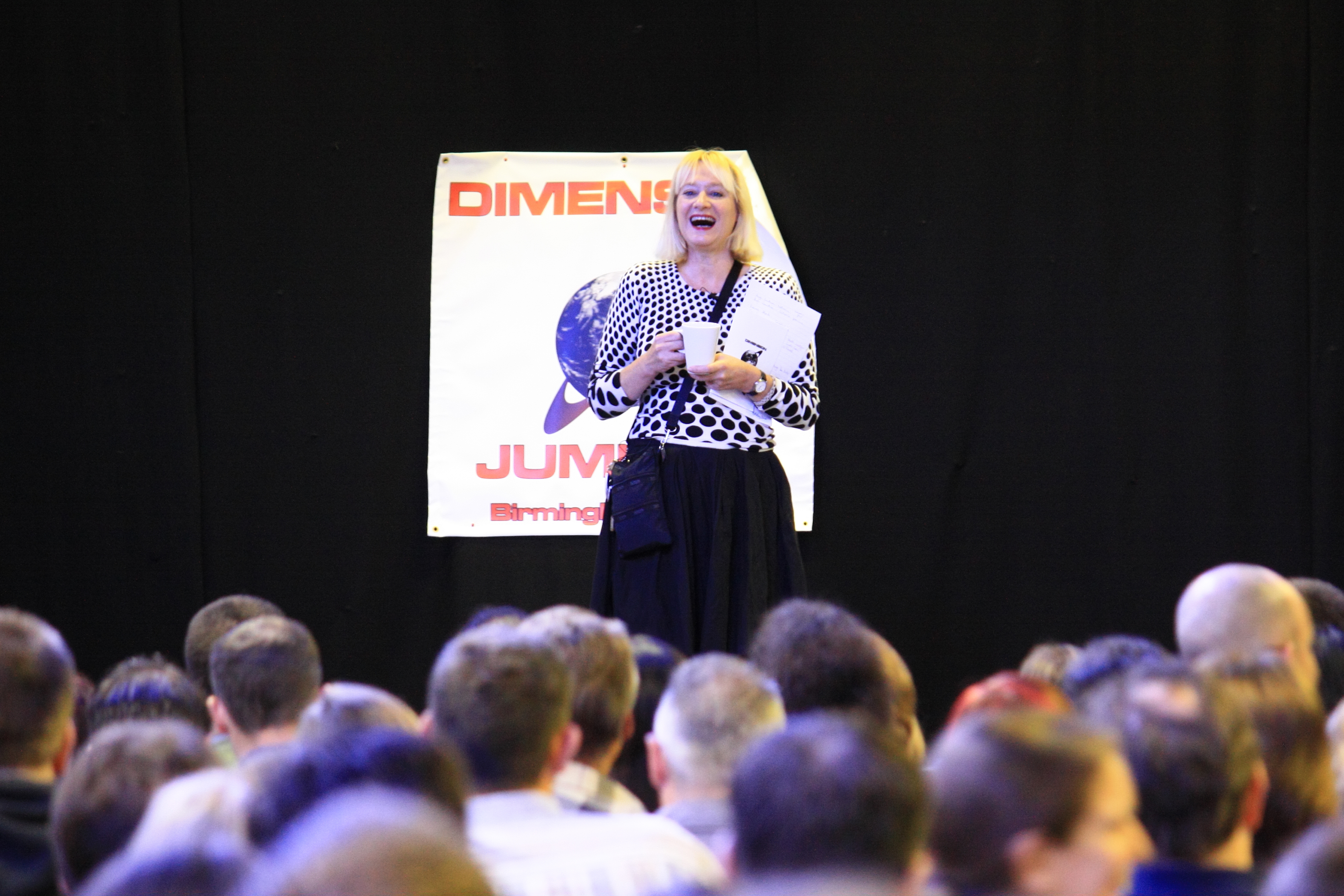
Hayridge at the 2009 Red Dwarf Dimension Jump convention in Birmingham

Following a spontaneous five-minute spot in a London club, after "a bad day at the office", her first open spots were in a cabaret show (run by comics Cliff Parisi and Andy Lyndon) at the Edinburgh Festival in 1986, which then led to gigs on the London comedy circuit and an award for the Hackney Empire New Act of the Year (1987).

In April 1988, she appeared on Friday Night Live hosted by Ben Elton, and was spotted by the producers of BBC's Red Dwarf for the episode "Parallel Universe" (Series II) to play Hilly, the female equivalent of the male computer, Holly (Norman Lovett). The same year, Hayridge received positive reviews at the Montreal Comedy Festival and appeared on the related televised Just For Laughs programme.

In 1989, after the departure of Norman Lovett from Red Dwarf, Hayridge took over the part of Holly, appearing in Red Dwarf series III, IV and V. She continues to be a guest at conventions and comic cons around the world.

Her television appearances include Have I Got News for You, Space Cadets with William Shatner and a winning performance on Celebrity Mastermind (2010). As a guest on Robert Llewellyn's Carpool in March 2010, Hayridge said that the previous year she was asked to tell a joke at US Immigration to prove her occupation as a comedian, she told the official: "The reason I'm here is I want to go to Disney Land. The nice bits obviously, not the touristy bits".

Acting credits include Jonathan Creek (Series 3 episode 6, "The Three Gamblers"), Lexx, and various characters with Jon Culshaw in Alter Ego (1999) and Kevin Eldon in It's Kevin (2013). In 2015, Hayridge had a small cameo in the film SuperBob.

In 2009, she performed in the UK tour of the American show, Totally Looped, where performers including Phill Jupitus, Humphrey Ker, Marcus Brigstocke and Sanjeev Bhaskar improvised live dialogue to film clips. She supported Alexei Sayle on his comeback tour in 2013.

Her stand-up television appearances include Live at Jongleurs in 1997, Australia's Rove in 2002, The Late Late Show With Craig Ferguson CBS in 2009 and Stewart Lee's The Alternative Comedy Experience on Comedy Central in 2014.

Hayridge's 1997 autobiography, Random Abstract Memory, tells the story "from her birth as a suspected appendicitis to her spontaneous leap into comedy."

== Books ==
- Random Abstract Memory (autobiography) Penguin (UK), 1997. ISBN 978-0-14-026093-9
- Sit-Down Comedy (contributor to anthology, ed. Malcolm Hardee & John Fleming) Ebury Press/Random House, 2003. ISBN 978-0-09-188924-1

== Collections ==
In 2015, Hayridge deposited material at the University of Kent as part of the British Stand-Up Comedy Archive. The collection contains DVD recordings of Hayridge's performances and a copy of her autobiography.
