= Chantal Demming =

Dutch actress (born 1978)

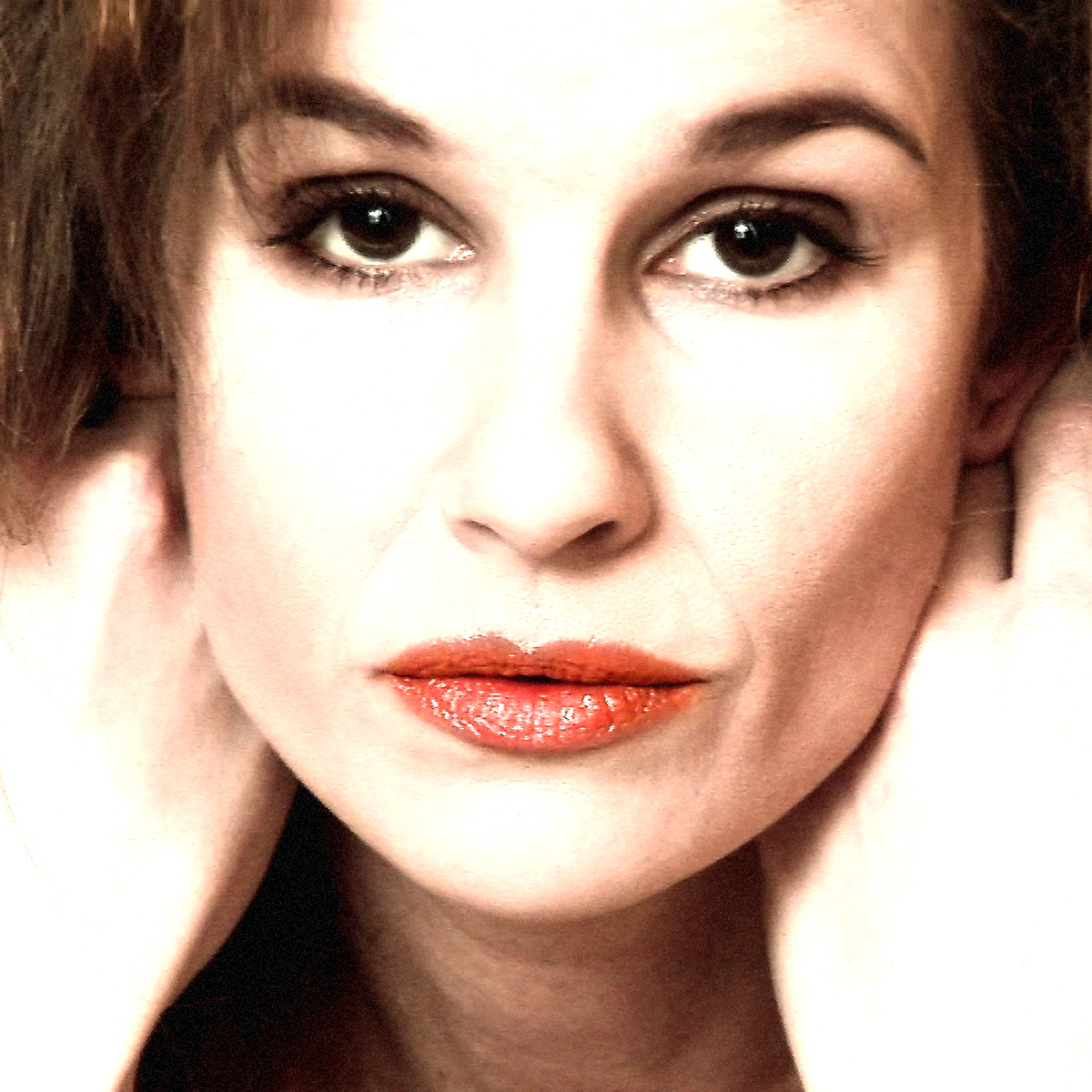
- Demming in 2010
- Born: February 5, 1978 (age 48); Baarn, Netherlands
- Occupation: actress
- Years active: 2009-2019

Chantal Demming (born February 5, 1978, in Baarn, Utrecht, Netherlands) is a Dutch actress.

== Biography ==
Chantal Demming was the youngest of three children and started at an early age to sing and act. During her high school years in Hilversum she joined the theater group Ons Genoegen, although she was at 16 actually too young. After having followed studies in psychology she auditioned at the Lucas Borkel Acteursschool (formerly Het Collectief) in Amsterdam, where she was accepted. In 2009 she graduated with the play Driesprong, written and directed by Helmert Woudenberg.

She played leading roles in Two hearts, one pulse, Vals alarm, and had a major role in Lilith and a few other short films. In 2010 she starred in the play Fallen Angels by Noël Coward with the theater company Sloof & Co. After her role in Lilith, Stephan Brenninkmeijer selected her for the lead role of Stella in his feature film Caged, which was released in 2011.

== Filmography ==
- 2011 Caged - Stella
- 2010 Wij willen meer - afl. 1, Jacqueline
- 2009 Helder - huiselijk geweld (Teleac) - lead
- 2008 Two Hearts One Pulse - lead
- 2008 Het leven uit een dag - Eva
- 2006 Dennis P. - colleague
