= Legermuseum =

Former military museum in Delft

Coordinates: 52°00′23″N 4°21′38″E

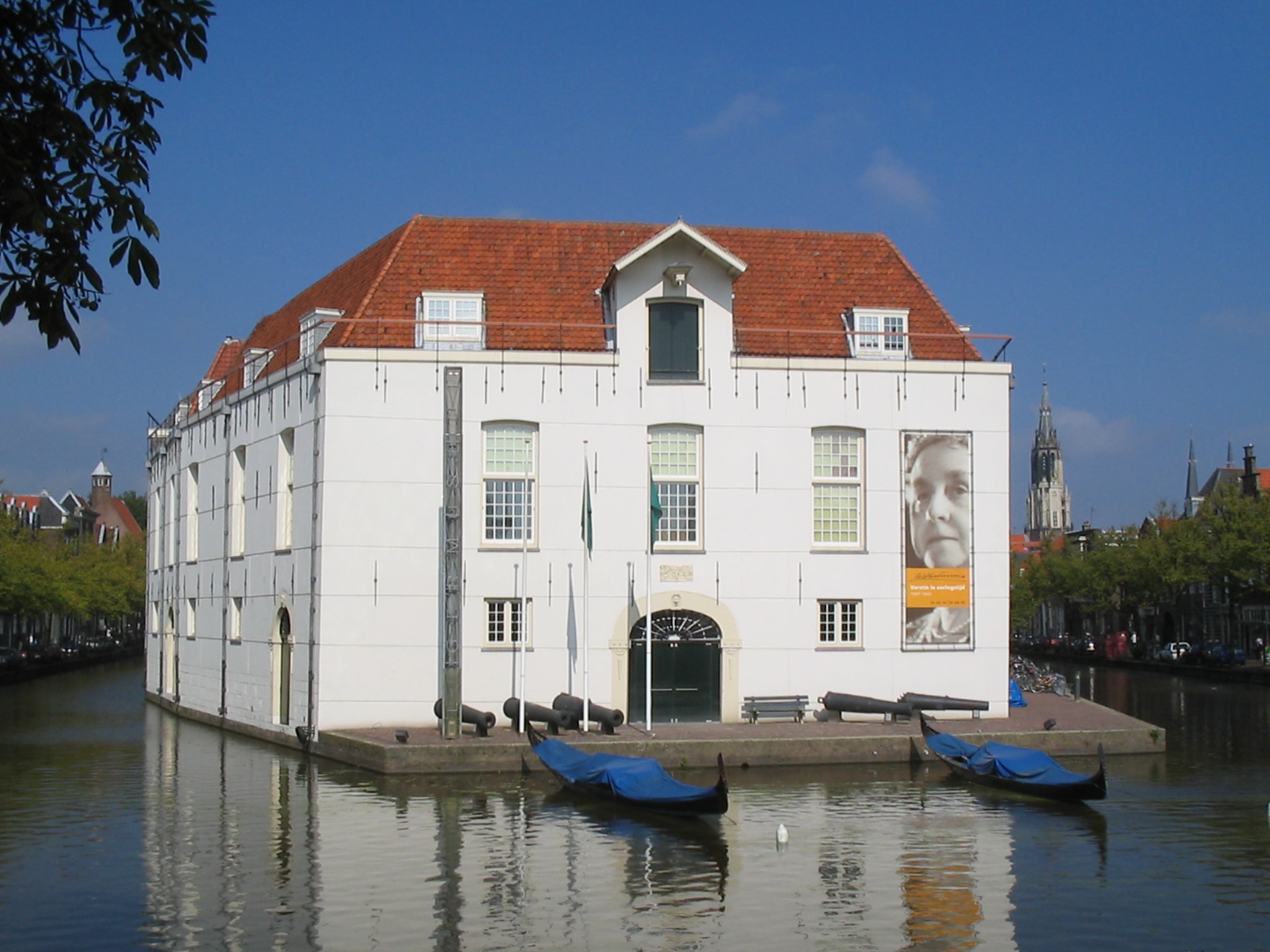
The Arsenal building in Delft

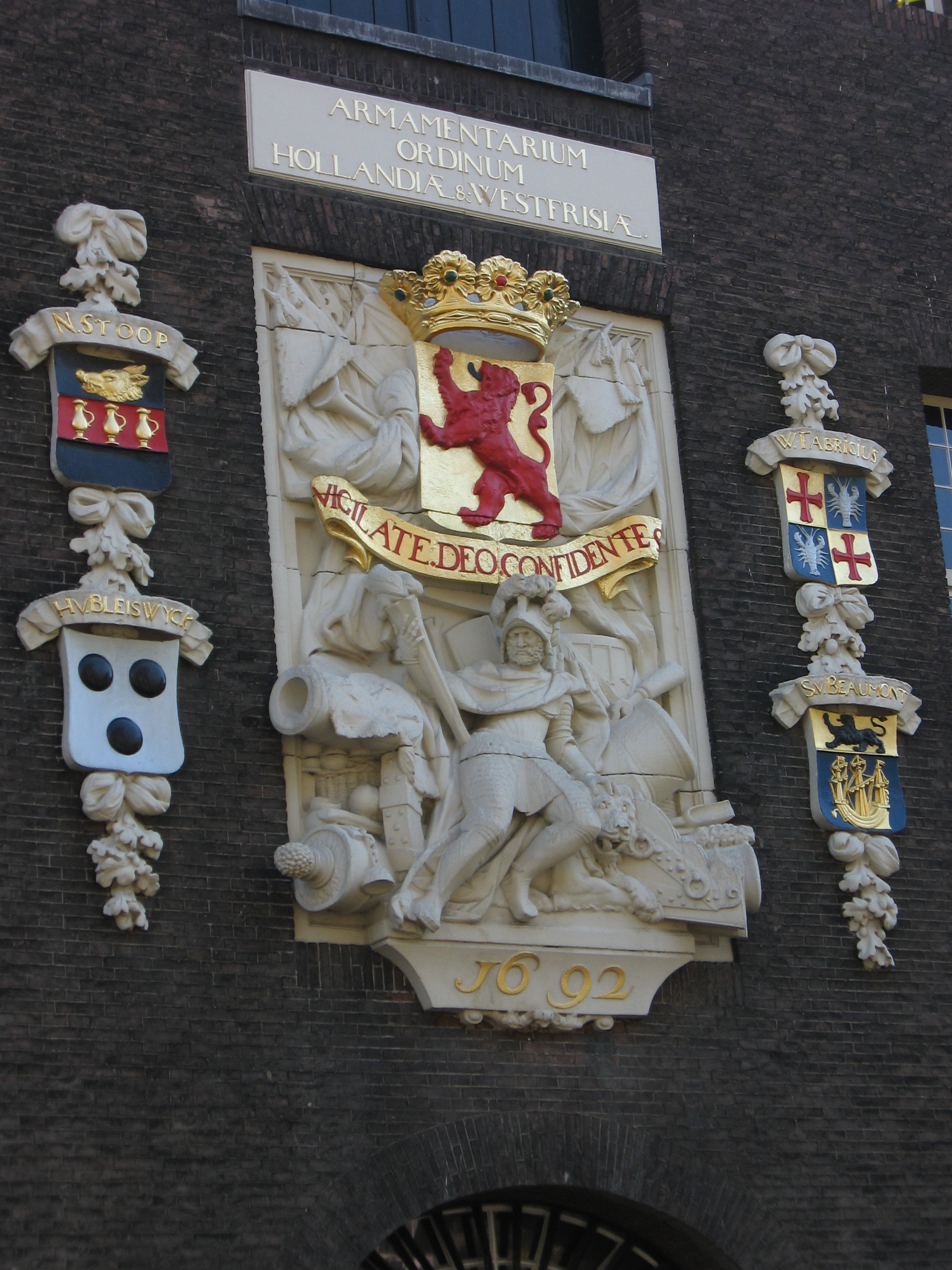
Stone coat of arms on the Armamentarium (Oude Delft side)

The Koninklijk Nederlands Legermuseum (Royal Dutch Army Museum) was the national museum of the Dutch Army. Until 2013, it was located in the Armamentarium in Delft. In 2013 it was merged with the Militaire Luchtvaartmuseum (Military Aviation Museum) and relocated to the former airbase at Soesterberg. The merged museum called the Militaire Luchtvaart Museum was opened on 13 May 2009.

== History ==
It originated in the private collection of Frederic Adolph Hoefer, who bought Doorwerth Castle to display it to the public. It was opened there on 5 August 1913 as the Nederlandsch Artillerie Museum (Dutch Artillery Museum) by Prince Henry. The Minister of War later renamed that museum the Dutch Army Museum Foundation (of which Hoefer remained chairman until his death). Shortly after the outbreak of World War II it was decided to move the museum from Doorwerth Castle to the Pesthuis in Leiden (the latter was then being rented by the Ministry of War from the Ministry of Justice), but the war delayed the restoration work and the museum only opened in its new location in 1956.

In 1959 the Foundation was also given the Armamentarium in Delft, with the minister of Defence opening a display there in 1986 in the presence of Prince Bernhard. The museum was given its royal prefix in 1973. The museum as a whole was opened on its new Delft premises in 1989 by Beatrix of the Netherlands.
