= Entertainment Experience =

Dutch TV-program and competition

Entertainment Experience was a Dutch TV-program and competition following the creation of a user-generated film-project in which two films were created: one film made by professionals named Tricked (Steekspel), directed by Dutch director Paul Verhoeven, and one "user-generated film" made by contesting teams of participants. The process of making the films was shown on Veronica.

== Production ==
The project was launched on September 21, 2011, and finished at the end of 2012.

The film script consisted of eight parts. Part one was written by Kim van Kooten. "The crowd" (participators of the competition) wrote the scripts for the seven following parts. Each of the participating film crews made a single short film, corresponding to their part of the film, while Verhoeven filmed all the scripts for his version.

Paul Verhoeven announced the name of his movie on 7 May 2012 on the television show De Wereld Draait Door. The international title of the movie is Tricked; the Dutch title is Steekspel. It was suggested by the participant Trudi van der Stelt, AKA 'Trudiola'.

On 24 September 2012, the movie premiered in the Tuschinski Theater in Amsterdam. Both the version by Verhoeven and the version of the participating teams were shown. On 28 March 2013, Tricked had its public release in EYE.

In March 2013, Lotgenoten (Counterparts), the user-generated version of the winning participants IO Filmproducties, was picked up by Benelux Film Distributors for nationwide theatrical release and on dvd and video on demand.

In 2014, the China edition of the project was launched (the local name is: 全民电影EEC). Director John Woo and actress Zhang Ziyi were attached.

In 2019, the concept was launched in the Middle East, in close collaboration with Shams Media City. The project was spearheaded by Nahla Al Fahad.

== Cast (Verhoeven's version) ==
Actor	Character
Peter Blok	Remco Albrecht
Ricky Koole	Ineke Albrecht
Carolien Spoor	Lieke Albrecht
Robert de Hoog	Tobias Albrecht
Sallie Harmsen	Nadja van Romsbeek
Gaite Jansen	Merel
Jochum ten Haaf	Wim
Anita Ludolphie	Maaike
Pieter Tiddens	Fred
Ronald van Elderen	Gijs
Celia van den Boogert	Verkoopster Nelly

== Progress of the project ==
The public film was composed out of eight separate parts. The course of the story was determined by the audience. From the beginning of the project, several production teams were formed. They filmed their version of the script. The community exclusively received parts of the final script, put together by scriptwriter Robert Alberdingk Thijm and Paul Verhoeven, in order to film them.

The crews who won a segment:

Part	Team	Directed by	Cast
Part 1	Nightwork Films	Henriëtte Drost	Peter in 't Hout (Remco), Jolijn van Dulken (Ineke), Tirza Gehring (Lieke), Mick van der Waag (Tobias), Rianne Dekker (Nadja), Tamara van Sprundel (Merel), Arjen van der Lely (Wim), William Vast (Fred)
Part 2 Part 3 Part 5 Part 8	IO Filmproducties	Stephan Brenninkmeijer	Alfred Heppener (Remco), Heleen van Doremalen (Ineke), Fransie Groenendijk (Lieke), Martijn van Hese (Tobias), Charmène Sloof (Nadja), Marleen Maathuis (Merel), Cas van der Sande (Wim), Mischa van der Klei (Fred), Nienke Brinkhuis (Maaike)
Part 4	Vicie Films	Maarten van Vliet	Rik Luijmes (Remco), Sofie Cornelissen (Lieke), Luuk Weerts (Tobias), Karlijn Lansink (Merel), Milou Adjanga (Nadja), Edwin van Weert (Wim), Peter Smith (Fred)
Part 6	Marantzfilms	Joris van Blerck en Max Huisman	Eric van der Velden (Remco), Yvonne van Uden (Ineke), Nina van Blerck (Lieke), Igmar Sauer (Tobias), Charlotte Quanjel (Nadja), Evelien Bijnen (Merel), Koen Andringa (Wim), Gert van de Meent (Fred)
Part 7	Van Goch Producties	Carel van Goch	Helma van Goch (Ineke), Hannah van Goch (Lieke), Wouter van Goch (Tobias), Lea Willenborg (Nadja), Carel van Goch (Wim), Jos van der Heijden (Fred)

Composers who wrote a winning score:

- Part 1: Roy van der Hoeven
- Part 2: Guy Renardeau
- Part 3: TTM Productions
- Part 4: Augmented Four
- Part 5: Luuk Degen
- Part 6: Meriam Stokman
- Part 7: Luuk Degen
- Part 8: Ruud Hermans

== The script ==
Seven of the eight scripts are based on various separate scripts, contributed by the audience. Based on these contributions, Paul Verhoeven and Robert Alberdingk Thijm composed a script each time, which formed the basis for the next script. In total, 85 participants contributed to the final scripts. Several recurring contributors are mentioned below.

Scriptwriter	Community Name	Scriptwriter	Community Name
Renee van Amerongen	Renee	Robbie Veenman	Robbyrrrrr
Lidy Koene	Lady	Esther E. Schmidt	Gelijkestrijd
Bart van Wezel	Bamahe	Annemiek Dirkzwager	Moek
Marco de Gardeijn	Marcusjosephus	Bob le Nobel	Bobsjoke
Kenneth Dingens	Kenneth	Marion Brouwer	Marsel
Richard Hendrikse	Rotery815	Silvia Nobis	Silvie
Carla van Vliet	Scriptster	Fleur Jansen	Fleur
Mireille Oostrom	Keshet	Stephanie Mac	Stephaniem
Constance van den Brink	C.Stans	José van Winden	Jopie70
Anne Karina Westerik	Anneka	Jozef Onno Johan Casper van Helsdingen	Onno van Helsdingen
Joost van Praag	JVPS	Frank Westerink	Frnkwstrnk
Faritsa Martina	Paula	Jochum ten Haaf	Murphy
Jonathan Maxwell Reeves	Ghostwriter	Tamara Bosma	Scooby Doo

The teams could write their own ending. The winning screenplay was written by Stephan Brenninkmeijer and Fleur Jansen.

== Soundtrack ==
On May 24, 2012, the winner of the soundtrack competition was chosen. Dutch band Reveller was the winner, with a song called "Hold the Horses". Reveller consists of:

Name	Function
Sven Sterk	Singer/songwriter
Ramon de Wilde	Singer/songwriter
Dennis Biesmans	Bass
Evert Aalten	Keyboard
Rob Klerkx	Drum

== Nominations and wins ==
- March 2012, Entertainment Experience was nominated for a Spin Award in the category Cross Media.
- In 2012, Entertainment Experience won the One Show Entertainment Merit Award in the Innovation in Branded Content category
- Tricked (Steekspel) was selected for the 7th Rome Film Festival in the category: Medium-length films
- In April 2013, Entertainment Experience won an International Digital Emmy Award in the Digital Program Non Fiction category
- In 2014, the Chinese edition of the Entertainment Experience was awarded with the Hurun Award
- In 2019, the UAE edition of the Entertainment Experience was awarded with the BroadcastPro Award as Trendsetter of the Year
