= Frederic Adolph Hoefer =

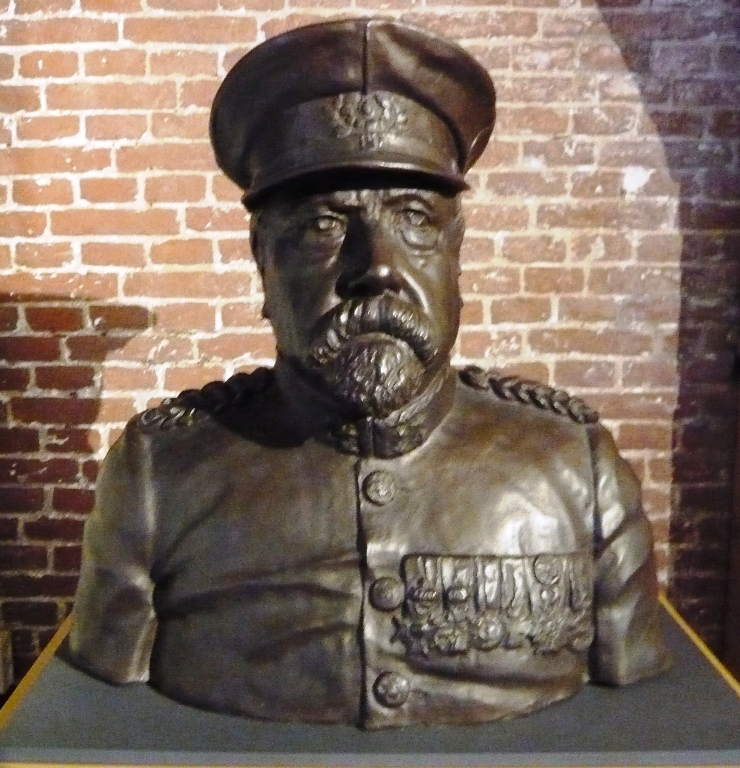
- Born: 14 April 1850; Sittard
- Died: 7 October 1938 (aged 88); Zeist

Frederic Adolph Hoefer (14 April 1850 – 7 October 1938) was a Dutch lieutenant-general, militaria collector and archivist. He trained at the Koninklijke Militaire Academie and is notable for founding the Legermuseum and restoring Doorwerth Castle.

Hoefer was born in Sittard and was in the middle of a successful military career when a fall from his horse in 1880 forced him to take honorable leave from the service. He began to write historical works, starting with the history of public clocks, when he was invited to work on the archives of Hattem, where he became the unpaid city archivist in 1895, a position he kept until 1931. Among other things, he is remembered there for his many publications on the history of Hattem, and his commission to restore the Dijkpoort as a new location for the Hattem archives. In 1894 he became director of the Provinciaal Overijsselsch Geschiedkundig Museum in Zwolle, a position that he also kept until 1931. Under his direction, that museum moved to its present location the 1551 patrician building Drostenhuis. From 1903 he was active in the monumentenzorg and was responsible for saving the buildings Gothische Huis in Kampen, the city hall of Hasselt, Huis Helmich in Zwolle, and the Romanesque church in Wilsum.

He is remembered most today for founding the museum Het Koninklijk Leger- en Wapenmuseum in Castle Doorwerth, which was bombed during October 1944. The remnants of the collection are in the Legermuseum in Delft. A memorial to him was placed in Doorwerth on the occasion of his 80th birthday.

Hoefer died in Zeist.
