= Swingers (2002 film) =

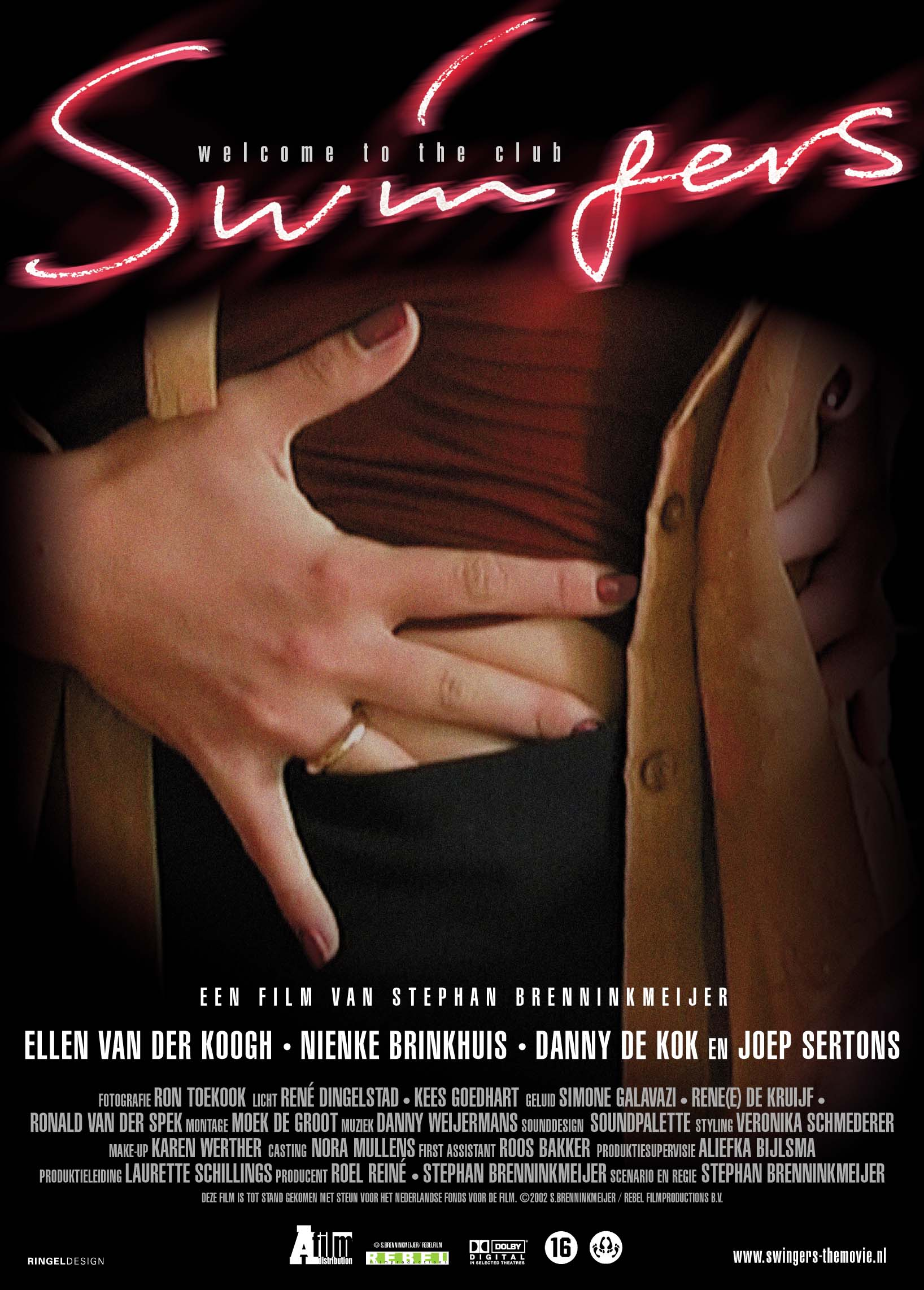
- Theatrical release poster
- Directed by: Stephan Brenninkmeijer
- Written by: Stephan Brenninkmeijer
- Produced by: Stephan Brenninkmeijer; Roel Reiné
- Starring: Ellen Van Der Koogh; Joep Sertons; Nienke Brinkhuis; Danny de Kok
- Edited by: Moek de Groot
- Music by: Danny Weijermans
- Distributed by: A-Film Distribution
- Release date: 30 September 2002
- Running time: 93 minutes
- Country: Netherlands
- Language: Dutch
- Budget: $25,000

Swingers is a Dutch romantic drama film released in 2002 and tells the story of a thirty-something couple Diana and Julian and their experiment in swinging. The film was written, produced and directed by Stephan Brenninkmeijer. It was a controversial low-budget production that was released in the Netherlands (in October 2002) and Belgium (in February 2003) and sold internationally.

== Synopsis ==
A psychological portrait of relationships and sexual desire. Diana and her husband Julian have been together for some time. Despite Diana's insecurity, she agrees to experiment with another couple sexually for the first time. They post an advertisement on the internet, to which Alex and Timo respond. Diana and Julian invite the other couple over to Diana's parents' ultra-modern house (the parents are absent) for a weekend.

Alex and Timo are confident swingers, especially gorgeous Alex, whose ravishing sexiness and confident sexuality intimidates quiet Diana, about whom it is hinted that the house holds unhappy childhood memories. However, Timo seems strangely uninterested. But once night falls and their sexual exploration begins the relationships are put to the test.

== Cast ==
- Ellen van der Koogh as Diana
- Dan de Kok as Julian
- Nienke Brinkhuis as Alex
- Joep Sertons as Timo

== Release ==
The film had a modest release, therefore didn't do too well at the Dutch box office but did well on the DVD/Video circuit. In 2020 the producer put the film on YouTube for free, where it garnered more than 30 million views in the short time it was available.
