= Stephan Brenninkmeijer =

Dutch film director, screenwriter and producer

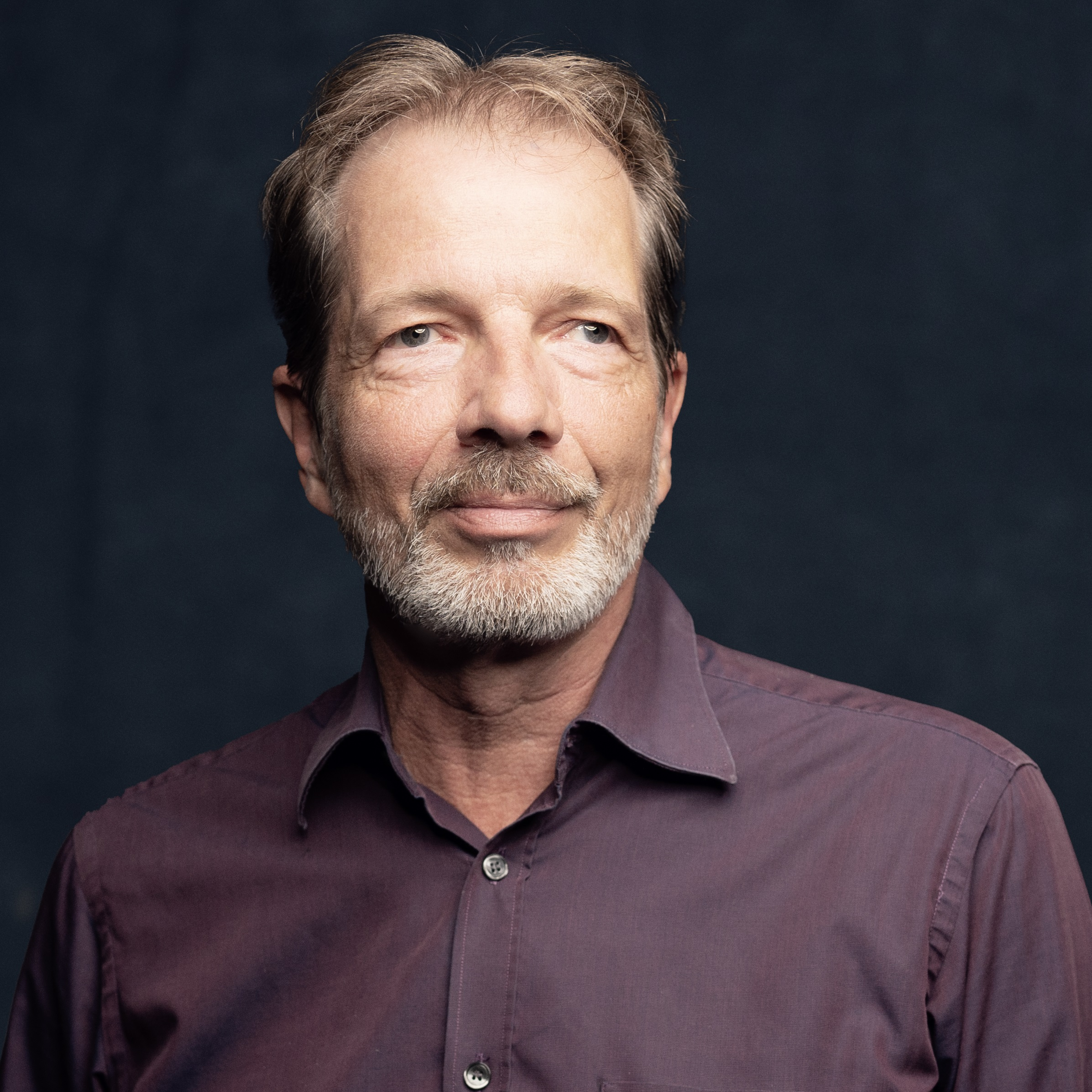
- Born: 27 June 1964 (age 62); Doorwerth, Netherlands
- Education: Dutch Film Academy, Amsterdam
- Occupations: Film director, screenwriter, producer
- Years active: 1994–present
- Website: www.brennfilm.com

Stephan Brenninkmeijer (born 27 June 1964 in Doorwerth) is a Dutch film director, screenwriter and producer.

== Life and career ==
Brenninkmeijer was born and raised at Doorwerth Castle, Netherlands, where his father G.H. Brenninkmeijer was owner of the Michelin starred Restaurant Beaulieu.

At the age of eight, his family moved to Apeldoorn. From 1988 to 1992, he studied at the Netherlands Film Academy in Amsterdam. Although aiming to direct feature films, he first focused on storytelling through editing.

In 1992, he started his professional career editing television series and films. As an editor, he worked with Dutch directors like Academy Award winner Mike van Diem.

He directed his first feature film in 2000, The Silence of the Soul, which won a Golden Crown Award at the ICVM festival in Atlanta, United States.

The same year, he co-directed the TV series Westenwind, which won the Televizierring.

In 2002, he wrote, produced and directed the motion picture Swingers, a controversial low-budget production that had theatrical releases in the Benelux countries, as well as internationally.

In 2011, he wrote, produced and directed the feature film Caged. Caged was picked up by Anderson Digital for US distribution, and released in February 2013.

In 2012, Brenninkmeijer participated in the user-generated project Entertainment Experience with Paul Verhoeven to make his version on the user-generated script. Both Verhoeven's film (called Tricked) and Brenninkmeijers Lotgenoten (Counterparts) were to be released in the Netherlands in March 2013. The Entertainment Experience won an International Emmy Award in 2013.

== Filmography ==
=== Feature films ===
Year	Film	Director	Producer	Writer	Notes
2024	Almanak, women to love	Yes	Yes	Yes	nationwide release in The Netherlands
2013	Counterparts (Lotgenoten)	Yes	Yes	Yes	user-generated Entertainment Experience film
2011	Caged	Yes	Yes	Yes	
2002	Swingers	Yes	Yes	Yes	nationwide release in The Netherlands
2001	The Silence of the Soul	Yes		Yes	Won Golden Crown award 2001 at ICVM Festival, Atlanta (U.S.A.)

=== Short films ===
Year	Film	Director	Producer	Writer	Notes
2024	Ice Cream	Yes	Yes	Yes	Winner Best short drama at the International Film Festival The Hague
2024	The Maimed	Yes	Yes	Yes	Winner Best actress The Hague Film Festival, Nomination Best short drama, Best actor, Best actress at the LHIFF International Film Festival Barcelona
2022	Burden	Yes	Yes		Best actress, director award at Mannheim Arts and Film Festival (Germany) among others
2022	Tea for two	Yes	Yes		
2022	Last bus	Yes	Yes		
2020	Fleur	Yes	Yes	Yes	Best actress, cinematography and sound design award at 48 hour film project Amsterdam
2019	Vogels	Yes	Yes		Best use of line award at 48 hour film project Eindhoven
2019	The knock on the door	Yes	Yes	Yes	Best actress award at 48 hour film project Utrecht
2018	Sh!ft	Yes			Premiered at Cannes film festival 2018 (HP MASTERS OF SHORT)
2018	Resolve	Yes	Yes		Best film, director and actor award at 48 hour film project Eindhoven
2017	Love you daddy	Yes			
2014	All is grey	Yes	Yes	Yes	

=== TV series ===
Year	Film	Director	Editor	Notes
2019	Camey Case	Yes		
2004	De Band		Yes	
2003	Bon bini beach	Yes		
2000	Westenwind	Yes	Yes	Won Dutch Golden Televisierring
1999	Toscane		Yes	
1999	Echt waar	Yes	Yes	
1999	Blauw blauw	Yes		
1998	't Zal je gebeuren...	Yes	Yes	
1994-1998	Crash!	Yes	Yes	
1993	Called at the bar		Yes	Won Dutch Golden Calf and Nipkov Disc award for Best Television Drama series

== Trivia ==
- Named his son Timo, a tribute to Joep Sertons' character in Swingers.
- Related to the famous Brenninkmeijer family, the richest family in the Netherlands known from the C&A international chain of clothes stores.
