= Ronald Top =

American actor

Ronald Top (born 1964) is a theatre, TV, and film-actor as well as presenter, voice-over artist and writer. Hollywood writer/producer Vivian Leigh wrote about his work: “Ronald’s performances have a depth and believability that are only seen within the work of the very best actors (-) His sensitivity to the needs of production and nobility allows greater performances from everyone with whom he appears.”

== Career ==
After finishing his four-year study at the Drama Academy in Maastricht, Ronald worked as a stage-actor in Antwerp, Belgium, at the National Theatre in the Hague and several other Dutch theatre groups. A leading Dutch critic wrote: “Ronald’s performance is so life-like, it’s frightening.”

On television he performs in drama as well as comedy series and both short and feature length films. Ronald has always been passionate about acting and presenting. “Can History be fun to watch? Absolutely! Just watch Ronald Top presenting Industrial Revelations Europe,” a Dutch critic wrote about Ronald’s history/engineering programmes for Discovery Channel.

The hit series “Industrial Revelations” and “Inventing History” show Ronald driving steam trains, flying hot air balloons, riding horses, lighting dynamite and climbing into the dark depths of a Polish flint mine. On “Legend Detectives” he marshalled a team of experts and travelled through Europe to the birthplaces of famous legends. “His unique blend of humour, intelligence and non-stop enthusiasm” is viewed by millions of people in more than 140 countries in Europe, Africa, the Middle East and the US. According to Bafta winning director Richard Nash "Ronald is the most engaging, entertaining and low maintenance presenter I’ve come across in over fifteen years of directing documentaries,”

Ronald played a leading role in the award winning feature film “The Flowing” (Danyael Sugawara 2009). This year he will star in the film “Dad’s last journey” from Golden Bear winning director Hanro Smitsman and in the Dutch drama series “A’dam and Eve” (Norbert ter Hall).

Ronald participated in the award winning Dutch/German production of “A letter for the king” (Pieter Verhoeff) and in the award winning film “The Roymann Closure” (David Grifhorst). He appeared in the music video clip “Utopia” from the Dutch band Within Temptation and on the internet in the British comedy series “Semitasking”.

Ronald has written and presented several corporate films. “Space Transportation: an ATV perspective” for the European Space Agency (ESA) won him the Best Documentary Award at the 2009 Scientific Filmfestival in Milan, Italy. The extremely successful and award winning ad-campaign for Grolsch beer – ‘Schtop!’ – made him a household name in the UK.

This year Ronald will work with New Earth Films in the Netherlands on the production of documentaries for the National Geographic Channel. He’ll work as an actor on several productions in his home country the Netherlands as well as the UK and Germany. Ronald is developing his first script for a feature film.

== Skills ==
Horse riding, scuba diving and sailing are among his favorite sports. He’s learning to play the cello. His native language is Dutch. Ronald is fluent in English and German.

- 2019 Tatort: Lakritz (TV series, Germany)
- 2017-Hunter Street
- 2013 Flikken Maastricht
- 2011-2013 Spangas (TV series)
- The Last Cop (TV series)
- Wim van der Weck
- Camping für Anfänger (2011) … Wim van der Weck
- 2010 De laatste reis van meneer van Leeuwen (TV movie)
- 2010 We gaan nog niet naar huis (TV series)
- Pokeren en hartenjagen (2010) … Peter
- 2010 13 in de oorlog (TV series)
- Na de oorlog (2010) … Veenstra
- 2009 Upstream
- 2009 Juliana II (TV mini-series)
- Koude oorlog (2009) … Minister Beyen
- 2008 Kinderen geen bezwaar (TV series)
- Roze wereld (2008) … Ben
- 2008 The Roymann Closure (short)
- 2008 De Brief voor de Koning
- 2008 Keyzer & de Boer advocaten (TV series)
- Fatale fout (2008) … Kees Kamp
- 2008 Summer Heat
- 2007 Voetbalvrouwen (TV series)
- Tot de dood ons scheidt (2007) … Ronnie
- 2006 Gooische vrouwen (TV series)
  - Episode #2.8 (2006)
- 2006 Juliana, prinses van oranje (TV mini-series)
  - De ondergang nabij … Minister Beyen
- 2005 Johan
- 2004 The First Day (short)
- 2003 Kramers Crisis (short)
- 2003 15.35: spoor 1
- 2002 Echt waar (TV series)
  - De Moeder (2002) … Anthony
- 2002 Serious Crimes (TV series)
  - Latrodectus Hesperus (2002) … Hotelmanager
- 2001 Dok 12 (TV series)
  - Dodelijke damesacht (2001) … Jack van de Made
- 2000 Tattoo (TV short)
- 1996-2000 Baantjer (TV series)
  - Dr. Bram de Graaf / Gerard Kroeze / Wim Hensveld
  - De Cock en de moord met een tic (2000) … Dr. Bram de Graaf
  - De Cock en de raadselmoord (1999) … Gerard Kroeze
  - De Cock en de moord op de wallen (1996) … Wim Hensveld
- 2000 Westenwind (TV series)
  - De zee geeft en de zee neemt (2000) … Robert ten Dam
  - Een grote stap (2000) … Robert ten Dam
- 2000 De Stilte van het Naderen (TV movie)
- 1999 In de clinch (TV series)
  - Oude liefde roest (1999) … Marc
- 1999 Maten (TV movie)
- 1998 Coronation Street (TV series)
  - Episode #1.4429 (1998) … Johan
- 1998 Combat (TV series)
  - De laatste test (1998) … Wilco de Kuiper
- 1998 De keerzijde (TV series)
  - Aan je brood ligt het niet (1998) … De Wolff
- 1997 Unit 13 (TV series)
  - Een valse start (1997) … Hoekstra
- 1996 Naar de klote!
- 1996 Zoë
- 1995 Achter het scherm (TV series)
  - Live (1995)
