= Lotgenoten =

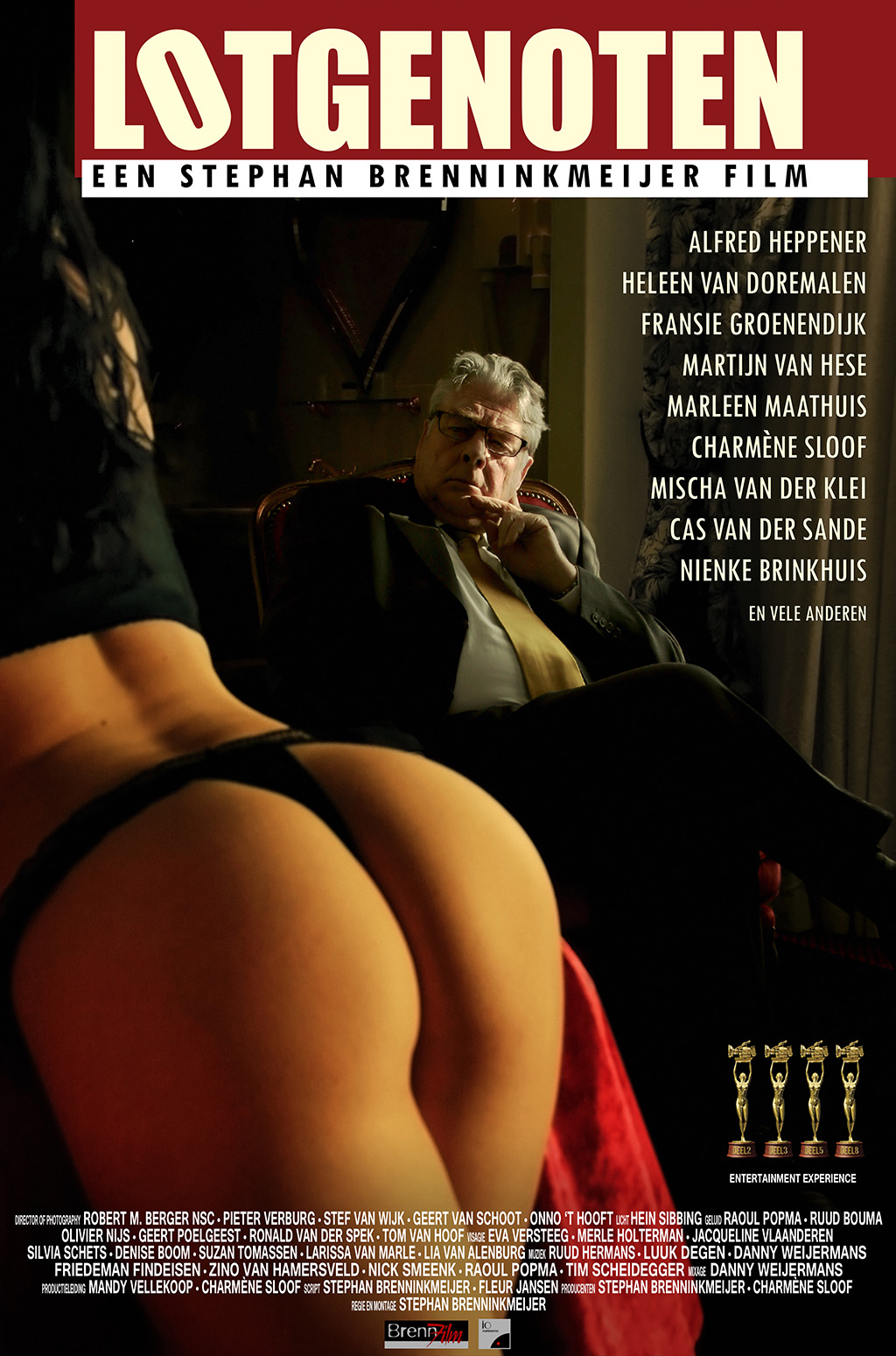
- Film poster
- Directed by: Stephan Brenninkmeijer
- Written by: Stephan Brenninkmeijer; Paul Verhoeven; Kim van Kooten; Fleur Jansen
- Produced by: BrennFilm; IO Filmproductions
- Starring: Alfred Heppener; Heleen van Doremalen; Fransie Groenendijk; Marleen Maathuis; Martijn van Hese; Charmène Sloof; Nienke Brinkhuis; Cas van der Sande; Mischa van der Klei
- Music by: Ruud Hermans; Luuk Degen; Danny Weijermans
- Distributed by: Benelux Film Distributors
- Release date: March 13, 2013
- Running time: 64 minutes
- Country: Netherlands
- Language: Dutch

Lotgenoten (Dutch for Counterparts) is a Dutch feature film, directed by Stephan Brenninkmeijer.

The film was made during the crowd sourced project Entertainment Experience with Paul Verhoeven. Lotgenoten was picked up by Benelux Film Distributors for Dutch nationwide release in March 2013.

== Plot ==
Remco Albrecht, CEO of Albrecht Construct and part-time womanizer, reluctantly celebrates his 65th birthday when his life takes a turn for the worse. His once mistress shows up uninvited at his party and turns out to be pregnant, his rebellious children try everything to humiliate him at his party and his business partners are scheming behind his back to sell the company. Yet in the end, nothing is what it seems.
