= The Link (game show) =

British television series (2014–2015)

- Genre: Game show
- Presented by: Mark Williams
- Country of origin: United Kingdom
- Original language: English
- No. of series: 2
- No. of episodes: 65

Production
- Running time: 45 minutes
- Production companies: STV Studios in association with Linkee TV and BBC Scotland

Original release
- Network: BBC One
- Release: 5 May 2014 – 17 July 2015

The Link is a BBC game show that aired on BBC One from 5 May 2014 to 17 July 2015, hosted by Mark Williams. It is based on the trivia game, Linkee.

== Gameplay ==
Three teams of two players each attempt to amass cash by answering questions and identifying the common thread that links them.

=== First round ===
Cash amounts of £125, £300, £500, £750, £1,000 and £2,000 are displayed on a screen. Each is suspended from the top edge by a different number of links from one to six, in ascending order of the values.

The host asks sets of toss-up questions, with a maximum of four questions per set. Any contestant may buzz-in and attempt to answer a question, without conferring with their partner. A correct answer allows the teammates to confer briefly and guess the link between the answers in that set. If they guess correctly, they are allowed to cut some of the links holding up the cash amounts, starting with four on the first question in the set and decreasing by one for each additional question asked. The team may use all of their cuts on one amount or distribute them among two or more as they see fit.

When a team cuts the last link holding up a cash amount, it drops off the screen and is credited to their bank. The round continues until all six amounts have dropped, at which point the lowest-scoring team is eliminated from the game with no winnings. If there is a tie for low score (only possible at £0), the affected teams play one last set of questions; the team that identifies the link between the answers wins £125 and advances.

=== Second round ===
The cash totals of the two remaining teams are each suspended by seven links. Play alternates between the teams, with the high scorers deciding who will play first. The team in control decides how many links they want to earn, from one to four, and the host reads a series of clues to a subject. The team receives four clues if they choose to play for one link, and one fewer clue for each additional link. If the team correctly identifies the subject, they cut the chosen number of links on their own cash total. An incorrect guess gives all four clues to the opposing team, with one link at stake. The first team to cut all the links on their own total advances to the final with that money, while the other team leaves with nothing.

=== Final round ===
The team has 60 seconds to identify the links between sets of items. One contestant plays at a time, and is shown one item at a time in a list of 10. The clock begins to run when the first item is revealed, and stops when either the contestant buzzes-in to guess the link or all 10 items have been revealed, whichever comes first. A correct response moves the team one step up a six-level money ladder, using the same values as Round 1, but a miss requires the same contestant to play a new list.

After any correct answer, the team may choose to stop the game and keep the money won to that point, or risk it and continue playing. If they continue, the partner of the contestant who played the last list takes control. Identifying six links in 60 seconds awards £2,000 plus the cash total brought in from Round 2. If time runs out, the team leaves with nothing.

The maximum potential winnings total is £6,675, achieved if one team banks all the money in Round 1, then wins Round 2 and the final.

== Transmissions ==
Series	Start date	End date	Episodes
1	5 May 2014	22 February 2015	25
2	26 January 2015	17 July 2015	40
