= Industrial Revelations =

- Starring: Mark Williams; Rory McGrath; Ronald Top
- Country of origin: United Kingdom
- No. of seasons: 5
- No. of episodes: 46

Production
- Running time: 30 minutes

Original release
- Network: Discovery
- Release: January 10, 2002 – 2008

Industrial Revelations is a documentary show showing the connections between related industrial advances. The show's presenter has changed several times since the original host of Mark Williams in 2001 and 2002.

== Episode guide ==
Series 1 - 2002 - Industrial Revelations - Mark Williams

- 1. Boom Time: Coal, canals and steam, an explosive combination.
- 2. Pants for All: The industrial transformation on the cotton industry.
- 3. Clocking On
- 4. Pennine Passage
- 5. Working Iron
- 6. Coining It: A look into a few of the Thousand Trades of Birmingham
- 7. Cutting Edge: Steel and cutlery in Sheffield
- 8. The Iron Horse
- 9. Highland Flop
- 10. Power Crazy

Series 2 - 2005 - More Industrial Revelations - Mark Williams

- 1. Bread and Beer
- 2. What to Wear?
- 3. Gas on Wheels
- 4. Print and Paper
- 5. Under Pressure
- 6. Building a Revolution
- 7. Bright Sparks
- 8. Heavy Metal
- 9. Cutting it fine
- 10. Machine Tools

Series 3 - 2005 - Industrial Revelations - The European Story - Ronald Top

- 1. Reaping the Whirlwind
- 2. The Canal King
- 3. Hot Metal
- 4. The Impossible Railway
- 5. Big Bang
- 6. Generation Electric
- 7. Industrial Espionage
- 8. Steam on the Water
- 9. Iron Men of Sweden
- 10. King Silk

Series 4 - 2006 - More Industrial Revelations Europe - Ronald Top

- 1. Bread, Beer and Salt
- 2. Building Europe
- 3. The City
- 4. Cotton, Linen and Rope
- 5. Eiffel's Tower
- 6. Exploding Engines
- 7. High Fliers
- 8. Perfect Porcelain
- 9. Steaming up the Alps
- 10. Swedish Waterways

Series 5 - 2008 - Rory McGrath

- 1. Buildings
- 2. Planes
- 3. Bridges
- 4. Vehicles
- 5. Ships
- 6. Transport Networks
