= De Stilte van het Naderen =

- Directed by: Stephan Brenninkmeijer
- Written by: Dick van den Heuvel; Stephan Brenninkmeijer
- Produced by: Peter Maris
- Starring: Elvira Out; Daan Hugeart; Ronald Top
- Cinematography: Han Wennink
- Edited by: Elsbeth Kasteel
- Music by: Soundpalette
- Distributed by: EO
- Release date: 2000
- Running time: 104 minutes
- Country: Netherlands
- Language: Dutch
- Budget: 700.000 EURO

De Stilte van het Naderen (English title: Silence of the Soul) is a 2000 Dutch film directed by Stephan Brenninkmeijer.

== Plot ==
When Jules Brasschaert, convicted and jailed for a crime he has committed several years ago, is pardoned, he becomes a changed man. He found his peace with the help of his belief in God. After a circumstantial meeting with this man, Susan burns her bridges to be with him. As it turns out she is to redeem herself of a childhood trauma. While this is going on, Susan's fiancée is losing grips on his steady and well planned life and shows his true face.

== Cast ==
- Elvira Out - Susan
- Daan Hugaert - Jules
- Ronald Top - David

== Awards ==
'Silence of the Soul' Won the 'Golden Crown Award' for Best Foreign Film at the ICVM festival, Atlanta USA in 2001.
