= Mark Williams (actor) =

English actor, comedian, presenter and screenwriter

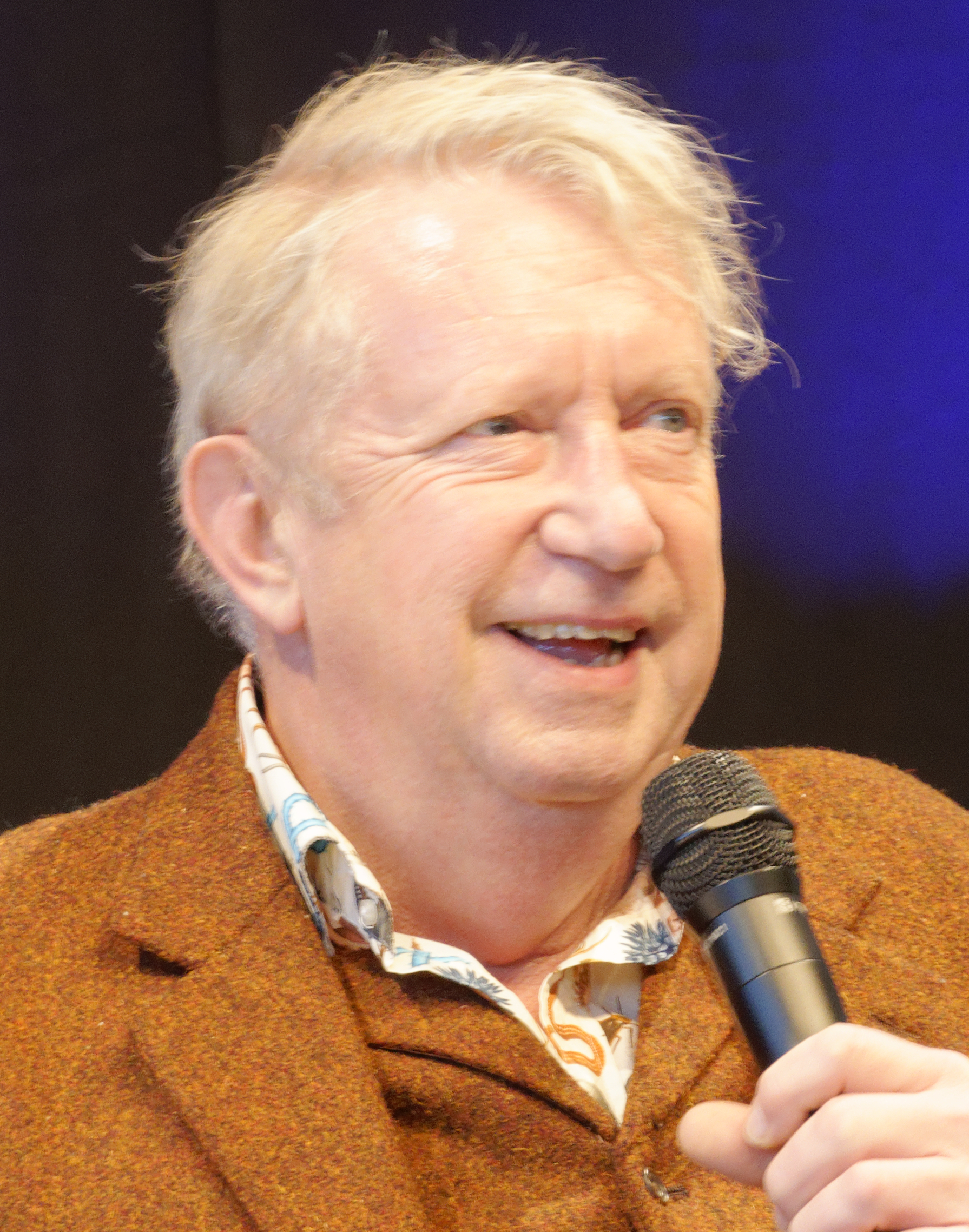
- Williams in 2021
- Born: Bromsgrove, Worcestershire, England
- Occupations: Actor; comedian; presenter; screenwriter
- Years active: 1982–present
- Children: 1

Mark Williams is an English actor, comedian, presenter and screenwriter. He first achieved widespread recognition as one of the central performers in the BBC sketch show The Fast Show. His film roles include Horace in 101 Dalmatians (1996) and Arthur Weasley in seven of the Harry Potter films. He appeared in Doctor Who and Red Dwarf. Since 2013, Williams has portrayed the title character in the long-running BBC series loosely based on the Father Brown short stories by G. K. Chesterton.

== Early life ==
Williams was born in Bromsgrove, Worcestershire, England and grew up in Sidemoor. He was educated at North Bromsgrove High School and then Brasenose College, Oxford, where he graduated with a degree in English in 1978, and was president of the college's Junior Common Room.

== Career ==
Williams' acting work began in small-scale touring theatre, and he worked with the Royal Shakespeare Company and National Theatre.

Williams came to wider public attention in the 1990s through the BBC sketch comedy programme The Fast Show, in which he was one of the central performers. He has said that for a while "people seemed to assume I was a comedian, which I've never been".

In 1988, he appeared as the recurring character Olaf Petersen in the first two seasons of the TV sci-fi comedy Red Dwarf.

He played Arthur Weasley in the Harry Potter film series, making his first appearance in Harry Potter and the Chamber of Secrets in 2002. Other high-profile appearances include the film adaptation of Neil Gaiman's Stardust alongside Michelle Pfeiffer, Robert De Niro and Claire Danes in 2007 and a 2012 role in Doctor Who as Brian Williams, father of the Doctor's companion, Rory.

Since 2013, he has appeared in the lead role in the BBC costume drama Father Brown. Williams also featured in the first series of Blandings, the BBC TV adaptation of the P. G. Wodehouse Blandings Castle stories, broadcast in 2013, in which he played Beach, the Emsworths' tipsy butler.

In 2014 and 2015, he presented the BBC daytime game show The Link. The show ran for two series. His other film roles include 101 Dalmatians and The Borrowers, both with Hugh Laurie.

Williams has also presented several documentary programmes exploring industrial history which is his passion; Mark Williams' Big Bangs on the history of explosives, a follow-up to the previous series Mark Williams on the Rails, Industrial Revelations and More Industrial Revelations.

== Filmography ==
=== Film ===
Year	Title	Role	Notes
1982	Privileged	Wilf	
1987	Out of Order	PC	
1988	High Season	Benny	
1994	Prince of Jutland	Aslak	
1996	101 Dalmatians	Horace	
1997	The Borrowers	Exterminator Jeff	
1998	Shakespeare in Love	Wabash	
1999	Whatever Happened to Harold Smith?	Roland Thornton	
1999	The Comedy Trail: A Shaggy Dog Story	Patrick Nice	TV special
2001	High Heels and Low Lifes	Tremaine	
2001	Second Star To The Left	Duke	
2002	Anita and Me	The Reverend 'Uncle' Alan	
2002	The Final Curtain	Declan Farrell	
2002	Harry Potter and the Chamber of Secrets	Arthur Weasley	
2004	Agent Cody Banks 2: Destination London	Inspector Crescent	
2004	Harry Potter and the Prisoner of Azkaban	Arthur Weasley	
2005	Harry Potter and the Goblet of Fire	Arthur Weasley	
2006	A Cock and Bull Story	Ingoldsby	
2007	Stardust	Billy the Innkeeper	
2007	Harry Potter and the Order of the Phoenix	Arthur Weasley	
2009	Harry Potter and the Half-Blood Prince	Arthur Weasley	
2010	Harry Potter and the Deathly Hallows: Part 1	Arthur Weasley	
2010	Flutter	Raymond	
2011	Harry Potter and the Deathly Hallows: Part 2	Arthur Weasley	
2011	Albert Nobbs	Sean	
2016	Golden Years	Phil (Publican)	
2018	Early Man	Barry (voice)	
2022	Surprised by Oxford	Professor Nuttham	
2024	Robin and the Hoods	The Mayor	
TBA	Dream Hacker †	Edgar Wainwright	Post-production
TBA	The Dark Channel †	Mabuse	Post-production

=== Television ===
Year	Title	Role	Notes
1988	Coppers	Constable Spud Murphy	
1988	The Storyteller	Fearnot's brother	Episode: "Fearnot"
1988	Red Dwarf	Olaf Petersen	Three episodes: "The End", "Balance of Power" and "Stasis Leak"
1988	Alexei Sayle's Stuff		First series, six episodes
1988	Tumbledown	Lumpy	
1989	Great Expectations	Trabb's Boy	Episodes 2, 5 and 6
1990	Making Out	Manfred	Episodes 1 and 2
1990	KYTV		Episode: "Launch"
1991	Merlin of the Crystal Cave	Cerdic	
1991	Bottom	Boris	Episode: "Accident"
1992	Kinsey	Danny	Six episodes
1993	The Smell of Reeves and Mortimer	Don Powell	Seven episodes 1993–1995
1994	Health and Efficiency	Steven	Episode: "Cinderella Rockafella"
1994	The Fast Show	Various characters	23 episodes 1994–2000
1994	Chef!	Policeman 2	Episode: "Masterchef"
1995	The Big Game	Tommy Hollis	
1995	Searching	Gerald	
1995	Peak Practice	Roland Grogan	Episode: "Life and Soul"
1998	The Fast Show Live	Various characters	
1998	The Canterbury Tales	Chanticleer	Episode: "Leaving London" – voice
1998	Ted & Ralph	Confirmed Bachelor	
1999	Hunting Venus	Peter	
2000	Gormenghast	Professor Perch	
2000	The Strangerers	Cadet Flynn	Nine episodes
2001	Fun at the Funeral Parlour	Larry Nazareth	Episode: "The Jaws of Doom"
2001	Industrial Revelations	Himself	Two series (as presenter)
2002	Shackleton	Dudley Docker	
2003	Grass	Ben	Six episodes
2004	Mark Williams on the Rails	Himself	Presenter
2004	Carrie and Barry	Kirk	Twelve episodes
2006	Mark Williams' Big Bangs	Himself	Presenter
2006	Saxondale	Deggsy	One episode
2007	A Room with a View	Mr Beebe	TV movie
2008	Sense and Sensibility (2008 TV series)	Sir John Middleton	
2009	Inspector George Gently	Joe Bishop	Episode: "Gently into the Night"
2009	Blood in the Water	Jerry Hourihan	
2009	Agatha Christie's Marple	Claud Evans	Episode: "Why Didn't They Ask Evans?"
2009	New Tricks	David Beaumont	Episode: "The Truth is out There"
2010	The Indian Doctor	Richard Sharpe	Five episodes
2010	Merlin	Voice of the Goblin	Episode: "Goblin's Gold"
2011	Frankenstein's Wedding	Alphonse Frankenstein	
2012	Being Human	Regus	
2012	Hustle	Dale Ridley	
2012	Doctor Who	Brian Williams	Episodes "Dinosaurs on a Spaceship" and "The Power of Three"
2013	Blandings	Sebastian Beach	Six episodes
2013	Still Open All Hours	Planter's Salesman	
2013–present	Father Brown	Father Brown	Title character, 130 episodes
2014–2015	The Link	Presenter	BBC daytime game show
2015	Drunk History	Robert Catesby	Episode: "Episode Four"
2016	The Comic Strip Presents...	Chief Constable	Episode: "Redtop"
2017	Hospital People	Tony	Episode: "The Local Millionaire"
2018	Twirliwoos	Waiter	Episode: This Way, That Way
2021	Midsomer Murders	Pat Everett	Episode: "The Wolf Hunter of Little Worthy"
2021	The Dumping Ground	Les Vegas	Episode: "Old Friends"
2022	Harry Potter 20th Anniversary: Return to Hogwarts	Himself	HBO Max Special
2022	Sister Boniface Mysteries	Father Brown	Cameo; episode: "My Brother's Keeper"

=== Music videos ===
Year	Title	Role
2023	"Weirdo" by Girl Scout	Clown

=== Video games ===
Year	Title	Voice role
2016	Lego Dimensions	Arthur Weasley (voice)

=== Theme park rides ===
Year	Title	Role	Notes
2019	Hagrid's Magical Creatures Motorbike Adventure	Arthur Weasley	Face capture & voice only (stunt double used in pre-show)

=== Voice-over ===
- Power Rangers Operation Overdrive - Big Mouth Monster (episode: "Both Sides Now")
- Merlin - The Goblin (episode: "Goblin's Gold")
- Power Rangers Samurai - Eyescar (episode: "The Rescue")
- Lego Dimensions - Arthur Weasley
- We're Going on a Bear Hunt - Dad
- Early Man - Barry
