= Caged (2011 film) =

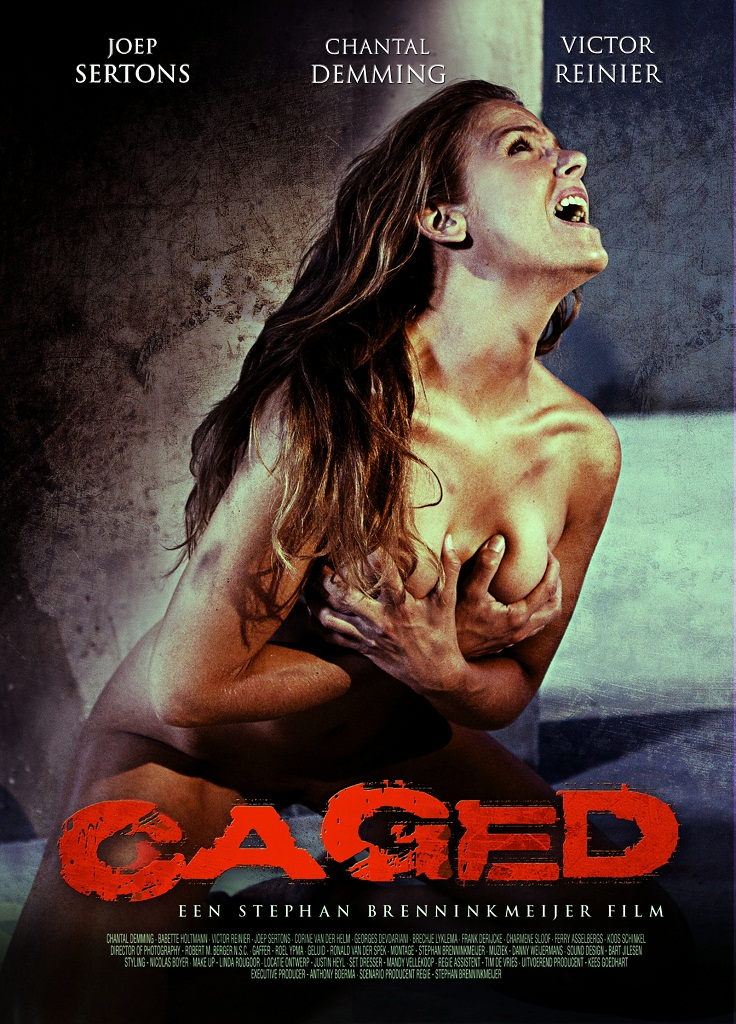
- Theatrical release poster
- Directed by: Stephan Brenninkmeijer
- Written by: Stephan Brenninkmeijer
- Produced by: Stephan Brenninkmeijer
- Starring: Chantal Demming; Babette Holtmann; Joep Sertons; Victor Reinier; Salar Zarza
- Cinematography: Robert M. Berger
- Edited by: Stephan Brenninkmeijer
- Music by: Danny Weijermans
- Distributed by: Video/Film Express
- Release date: September 1, 2011
- Running time: 105 minutes
- Country: Netherlands
- Language: Dutch
- Budget: $850,000

Caged is a 2011 Dutch erotic thriller film produced, written and directed by Stephan Brenninkmeijer. It tells the story of a married woman, who secretly indulges herself in a hedonistic lifestyle. The movie is controversial for its dark content and unsimulated sex scenes.

== Plot ==
Stella (Chantal Demming) has for years suppressed deep desires. She decides she can no longer ignore her feelings and begins a secret double life. She begins to lead a hedonistic life and visits sex clubs and erotic parties. Stella flourishes through all the new attention. Her husband discovers her secret life but says that she needs freedom, and hopes that it is only a phase. Then one day she finds herself unconscious in a cell and has no idea how she got there. Days go by when Christine, a woman about the same age, is brought into her cell. In the following days, they reveal their life stories to one other. Christine is convinced that the reason for their captivity lies in Stella's lifestyle.

== Cast ==
- Chantal Demming as Stella
- Babette Holtmann as Christine / second caged woman
- Victor Reinier as Therapist
- Joep Sertons as Raymond
- Georges Devdariani as Yaroslav
- Brechje Lyklema as Gaya / Stella's friend
- Corine van der Helm as Judy / Stella's work-mate
- Frank Derijcke as Luca
- Ferry Asselbergs as Damian
- Charmène Sloof as Laura
- Lotte Taminiau as Quinty / Stella's friend
- Salar Zarza as Laura's lover at exposition hall (uncredited)
