= Dijkpoort =

14th-century citygate in Hattem, Netherland

Coordinates: 52°28′32″N 6°04′11″E

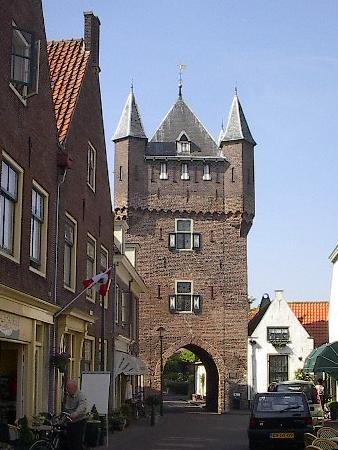
Dijkpoort

The Dijkpoort is a 14th-century citygate in Hattem, the Netherlands. In 1908, the gate was restored in order to house the archives of Hattem under the direction of the city archivist F.A. Hoefer. Nowadays someone lives in the right tower.

It is the only remaining city gate of Hattem, and it was refurbished and partially reconstructed by the architect Pierre Cuypers. A wall walk and corner turrets were added which are recognizable by the different colors of the stones.

Outside of the city beyond this gate, another "front gate" was formerly located with two round towers. A small piece of city wall is still standing that connected the two, where shooting holes for cannon and arquebus can be seen.

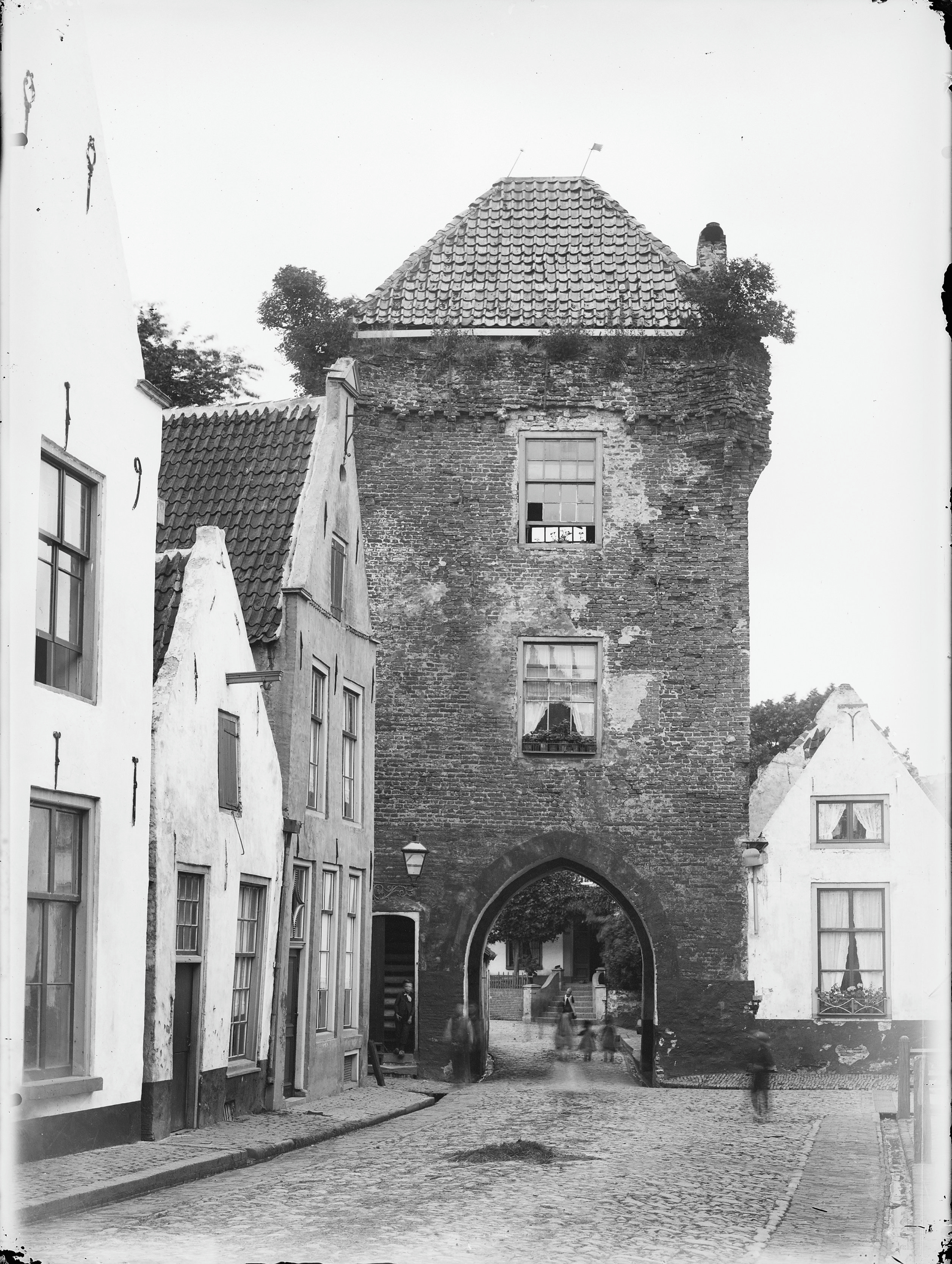
1890 photo of the tower before restoration

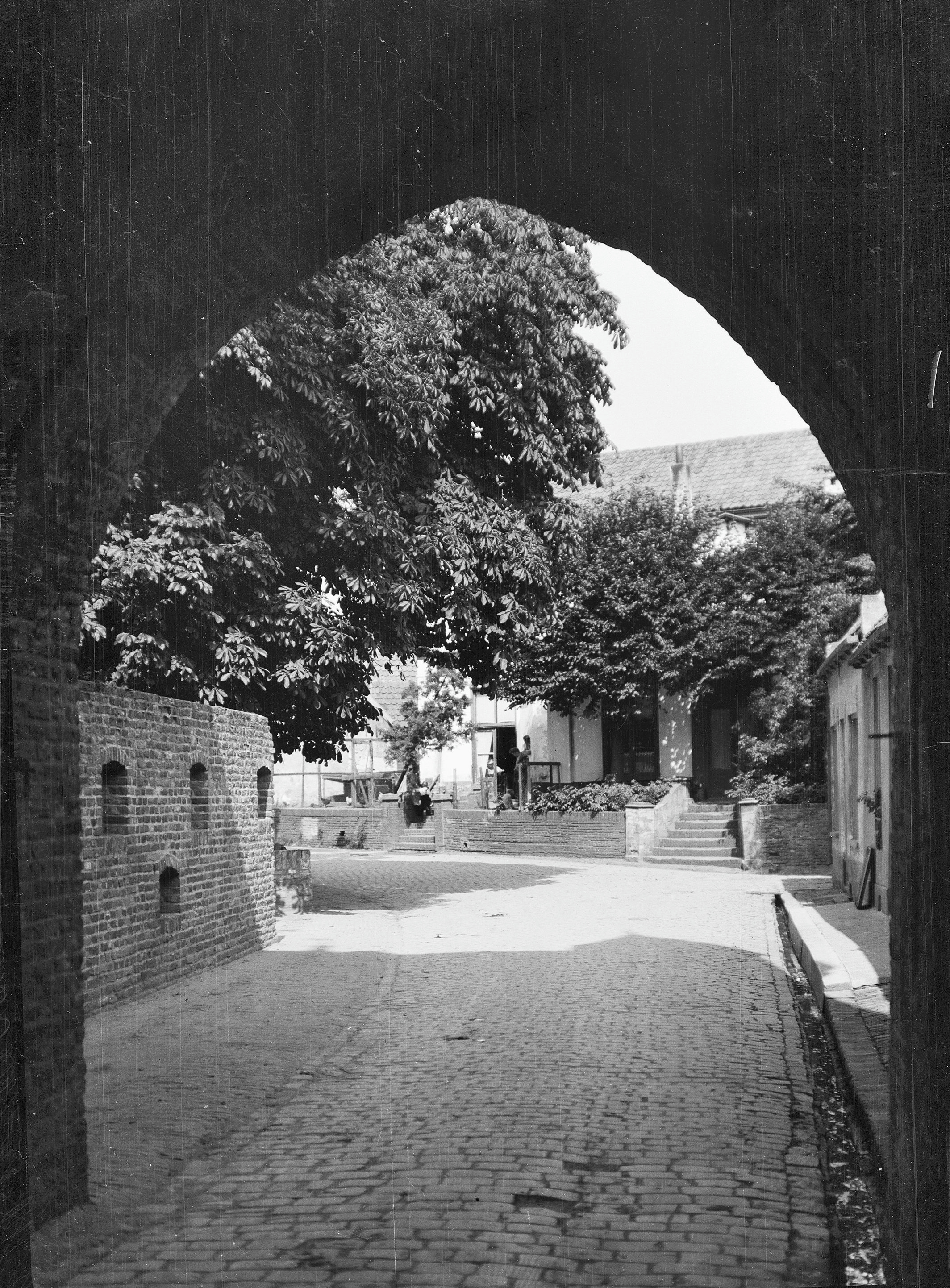
Looking through the gate, the shooting holes can be seen in the old piece of city wall on the left.

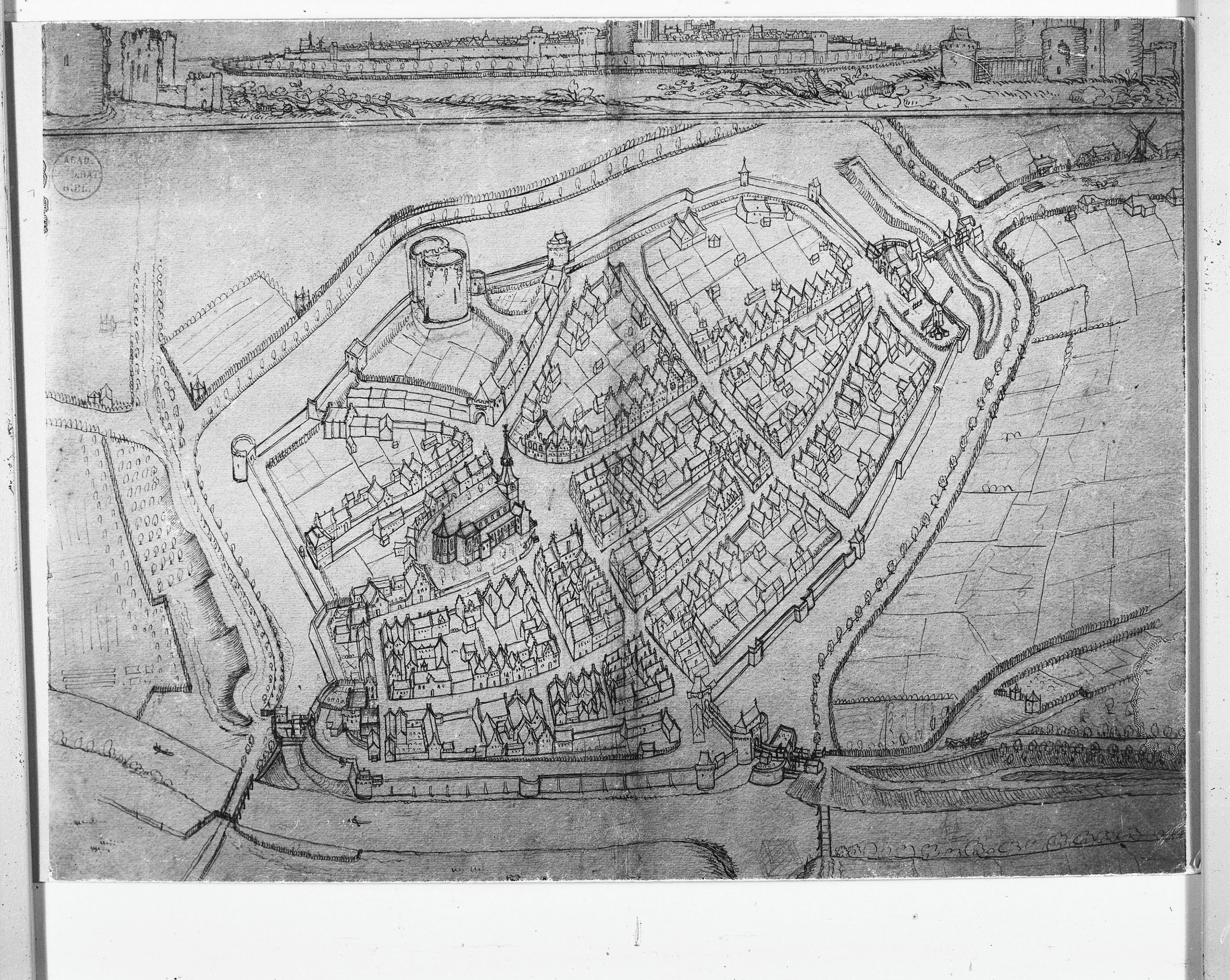
Old map of Hattem showing the front gate with drawbridge over the town moat.

Until 2013 the gate was open for auto traffic but it was discovered that this had damaged the gate and restoration activities included closing it to all but pedestrians and cyclists.
