= Beaulieu, Doorwerth Castle =

Beaulieu
- Interactive map of Beaulieu

Restaurant information
- Head chef: Albert Enke
- Food type: French
- Rating: Michelin Guide
- Location: Fonteinallee 4, Doorwerth, 6865 ND, Netherlands
- Coordinates: 51°57′58″N 5°47′19″E

Beaulieu was a restaurant in Doorwerth Castle in Doorwerth, the Netherlands. It was a fine dining restaurant that was awarded one Michelin star in 1966 and retained that rating until 1979.

Head chef was Albert Emke.

== See also ==
- List of Michelin starred restaurants in the Netherlands
