= Doorwerth Castle =

Castle in the Netherlands

- Doorwerth, the Netherlands
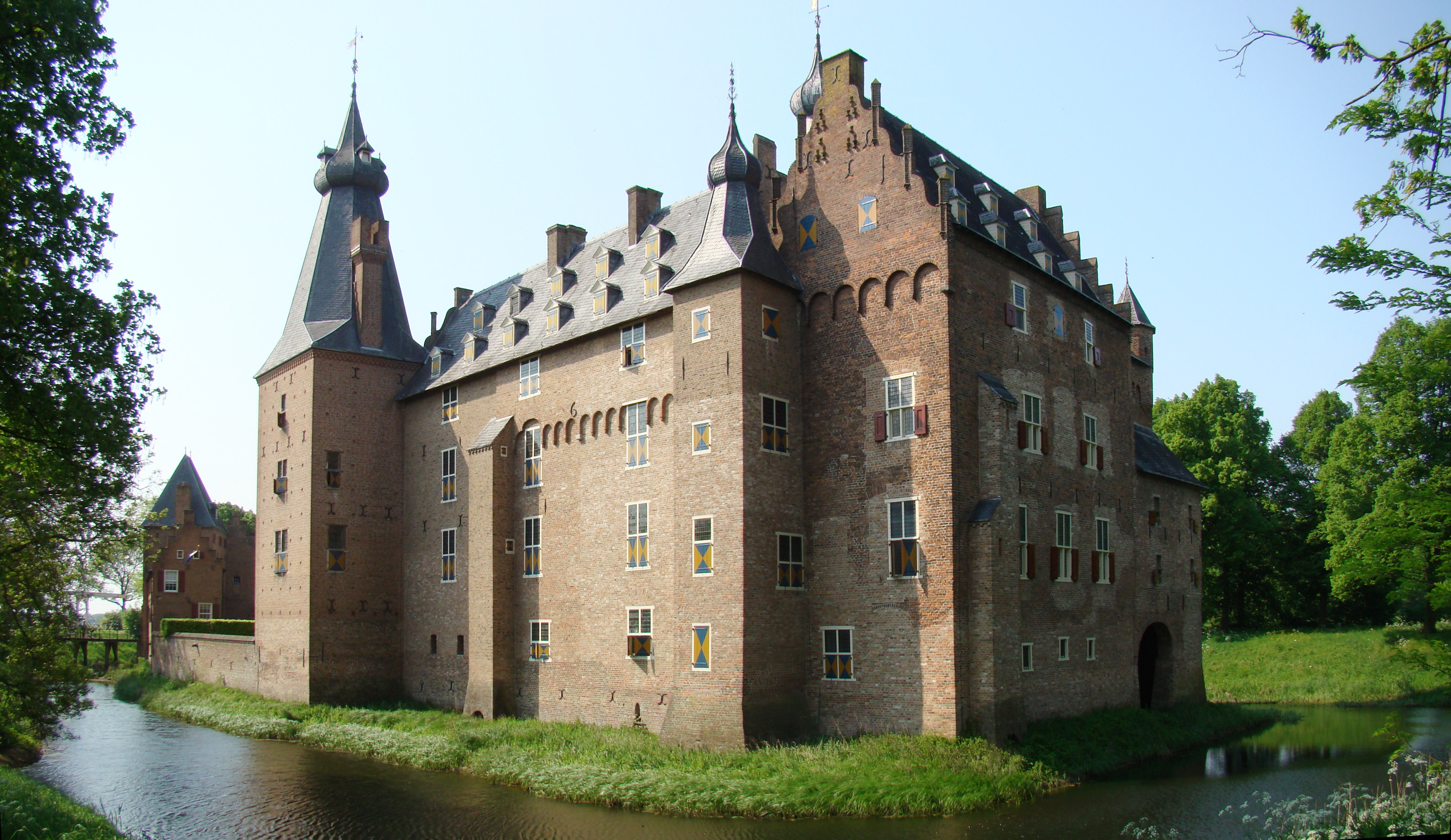
- Doorwerth

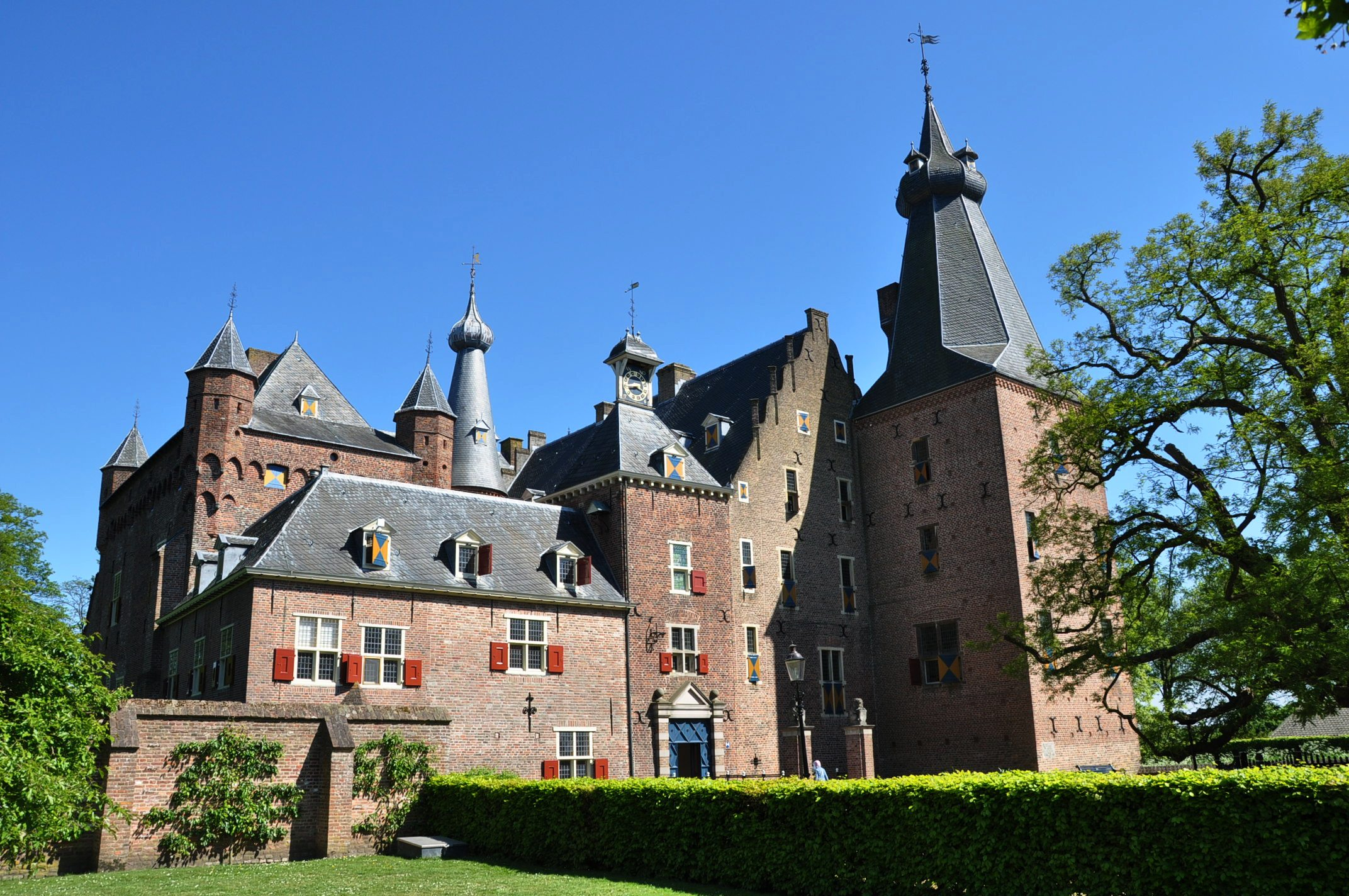

Site information
- Type: Castle
- Open to the public: Yes
- Condition: Good

Location
- The Netherlands
- Coordinates: 51.9667°N 5.7888°E

Site history
- Built: 1402-1560
- Built by: Robert van Dorenweerd
- Materials: Brick

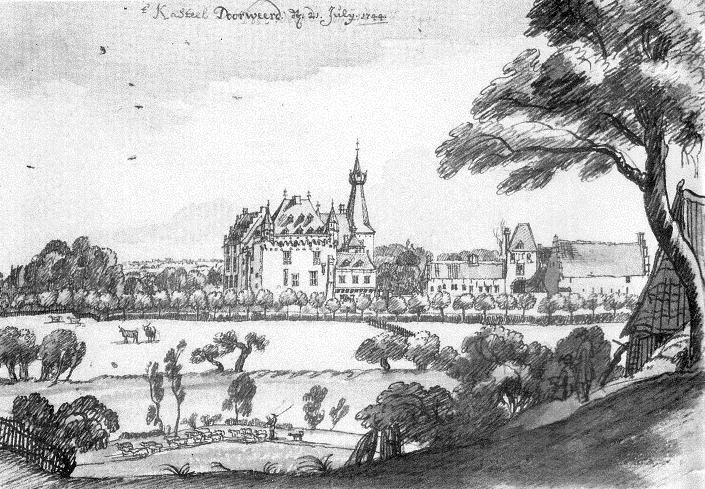
Kasteel Doorwerth (1744)

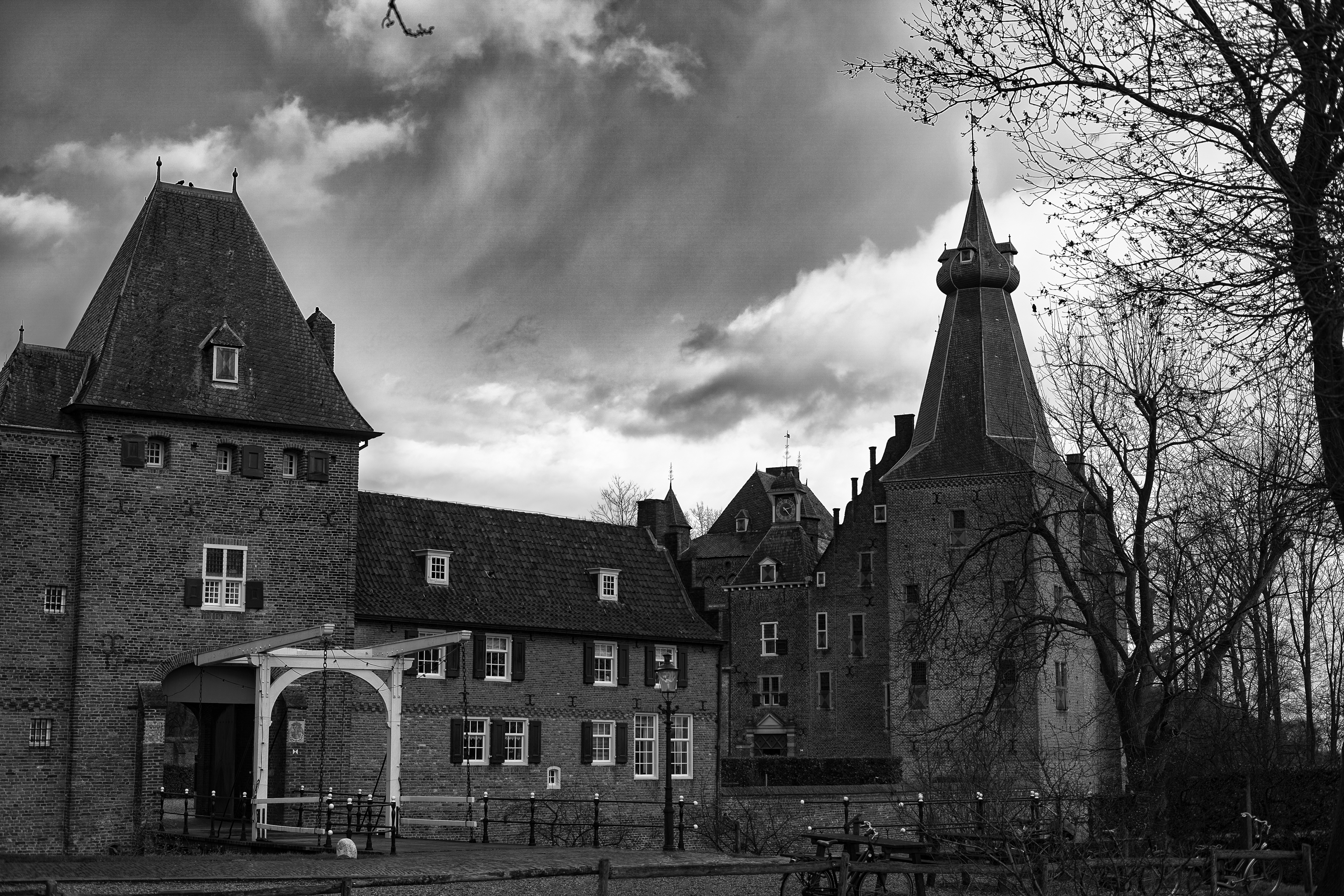
Doorwerth Castle in winter 2020

Doorwerth Castle (Dutch: Kasteel Doorwerth) is a medieval castle situated on the river Rhine near the city of Arnhem, Netherlands.

== History ==
The original castle, probably wooden, is first mentioned in 1260 when it was besieged and burned to the ground, after which it was rebuilt in stone. In 1280 this second castle was again besieged and this time the bailey was burned down. This castle probably consisted of a simple hall-keep, two stories high with 1.20 meter thick walls, and featured a surrounding moat which was fed by the nearby river Rhine.

During the 14th century the castle was continually enlarged. Doorwerth Castle was originally the property of the Van Dorenweerd family. In 1402 Robert van Dorenweerd dedicated the castle to the Count of Gelre, Reinald IV. In return Robert was granted the castle and its land in fief. Around the middle of the 15th century the castle was enlarged again, this time by knight Reinald van Homoet, the 10th Lord of Dorenweerd, who was also the owner of Doornenburg Castle.

Doorwerth Castle reached its largest form just after the middle of the 16th century under Daem Schellart van Obbendorf, the 15th Lord of Dorenweerd. He made the castle and the group of buildings on the bailey into a unity and adjusted them for more space and comfort. By 1560 Doorwerth Castle had almost reached its present appearance. Around 1637 the bailey was rebuilt to its present appearance and a dike was built around the castle to protect it from flooding of the river Rhine.

Shortly after, the castle changed ownership due to financial problems and was granted in fief to a German Count, Anton I van Aldenburg. His successors did not alter the castle or bailey but did acquire more land. At the end of the 18th century, the castle was no longer inhabited, but was looked after by a steward for its owners who now lived in England.

== Modern times ==
As a result, the castle was in a neglected state when it was bought, in 1837, by the baron JAP. van Brakell. He carried out a thorough restoration and a complete modernization of the castle. This revival of the castle only lasted for a short time; after the baron's death in 1844 the castle again fell into neglect. It remained neglected until 1910, when it was bought by retired artillery officer Frederic Adolph Hoefer. Again the castle was thoroughly restored, undoing some of the 19th century alterations and additions. After 1913 it was used as a Dutch Artillery Museum.

The castle suffered heavily in 1944 as a result of German destructiveness and Allied shelling during World War II. Directly after WW II a lengthy restoration began that lasted until 1983. By then the castle was back into its 18th-century state and was owned by the "Friends of the Castles of Gelderland" foundation who now maintain the castle as a museum.

In 1969–1970, Erik Hazelhoff Roelfzema wrote his book Soldaat van Oranje (Soldier of Orange) in the restaurant Beaulieu.

Dutch film director Stephan Brenninkmeijer was born at Doorwerth castle in 1964 and lived there until 1970.

In 2004, the Castle was investigated for the ghosts allegedly haunting it by the British paranormal television show Most Haunted.

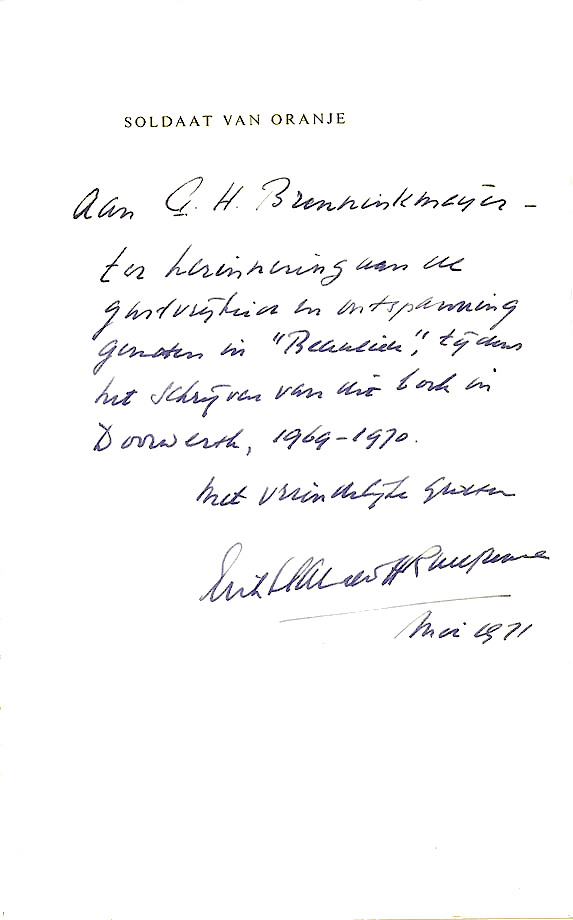
Translation: "To G.H. Brenninkmeijer - in memory of the hospitality and leisure enjoyed in "Beaulieu", during the writing of this book in Doorwerth, 1969–1970. Sincerely Erik Hazelhoff Roelfzema. May 1971")

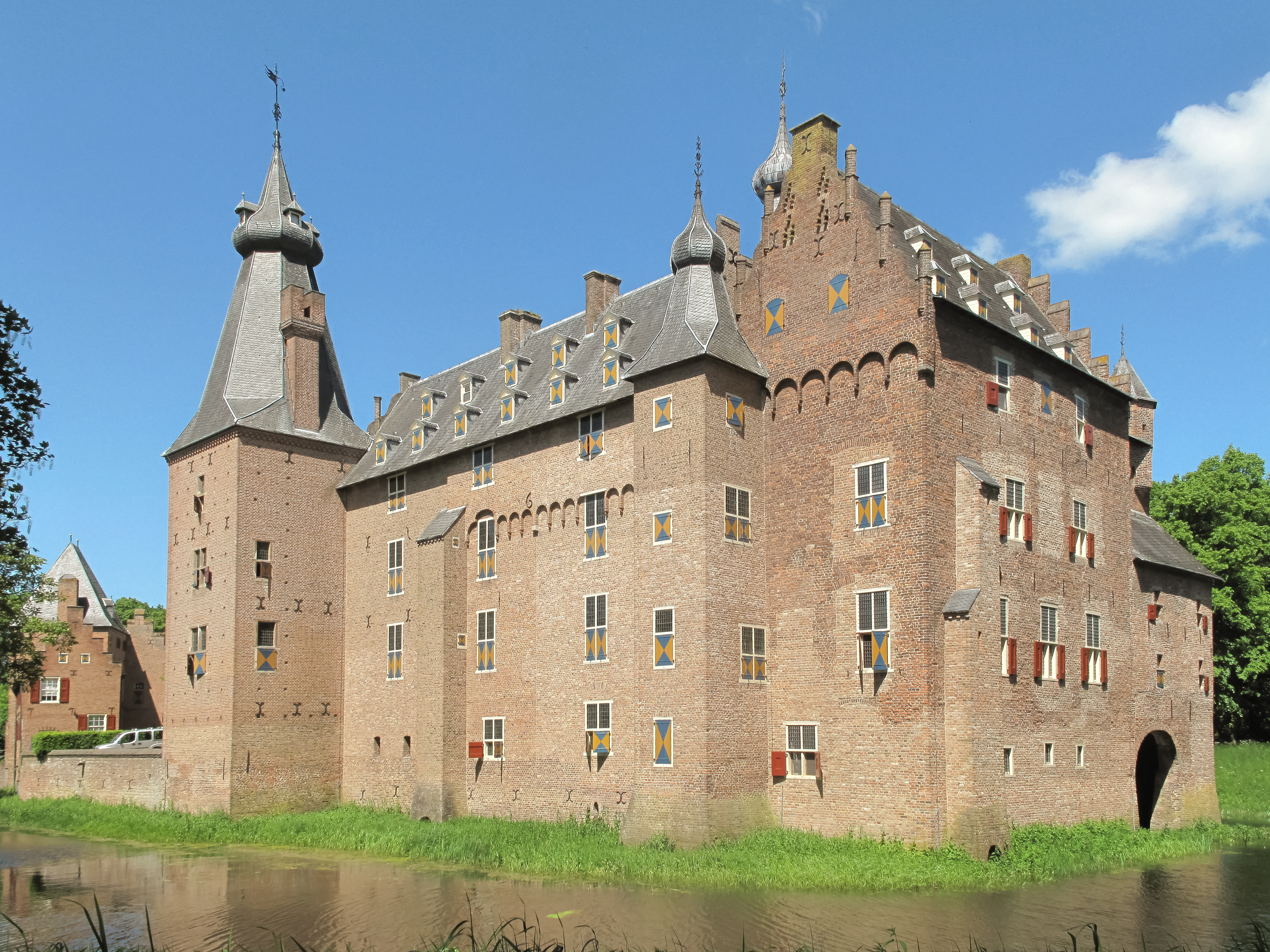
Doorwerth, castle: kasteel Doorwerth

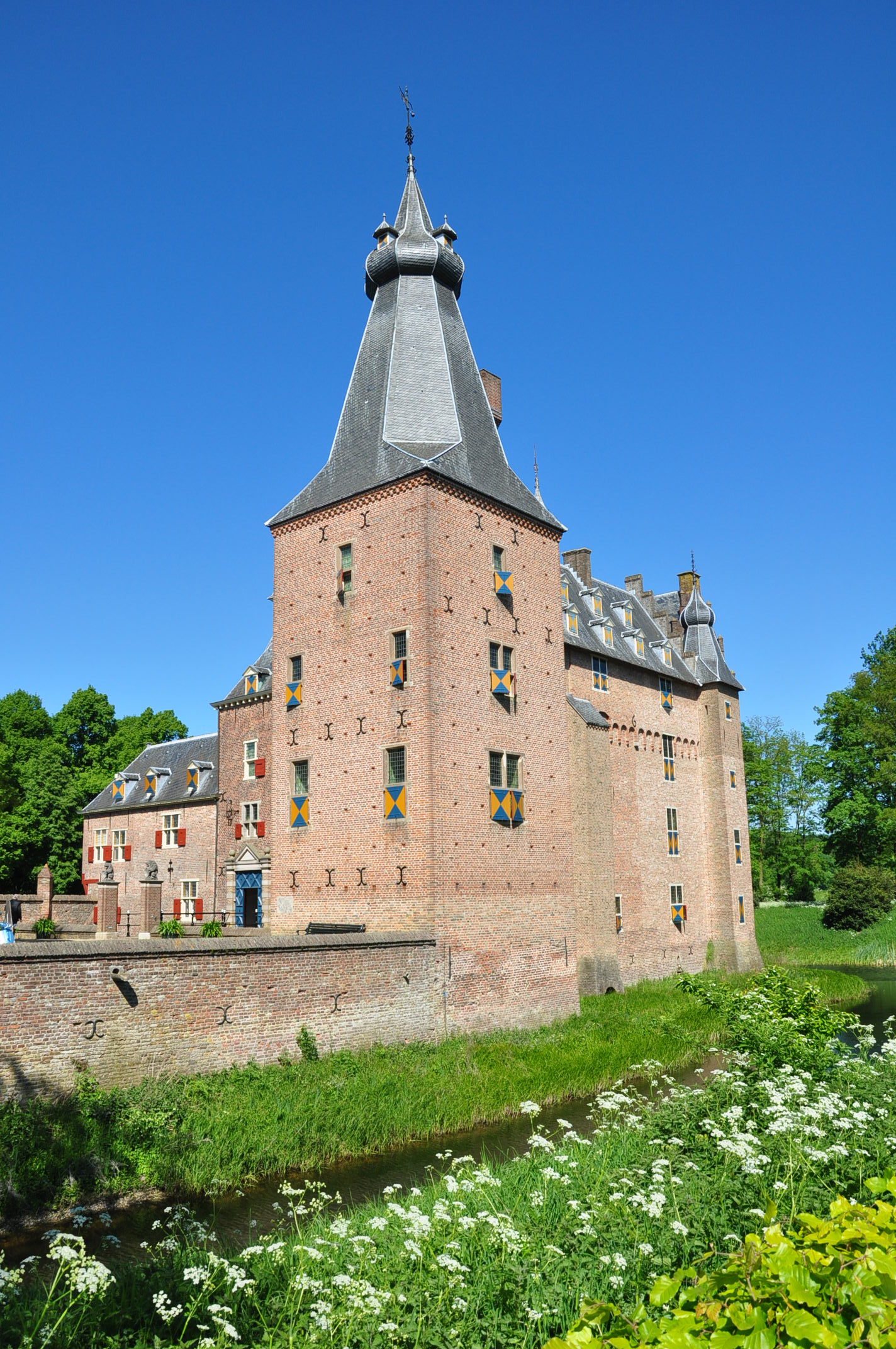
Main tower

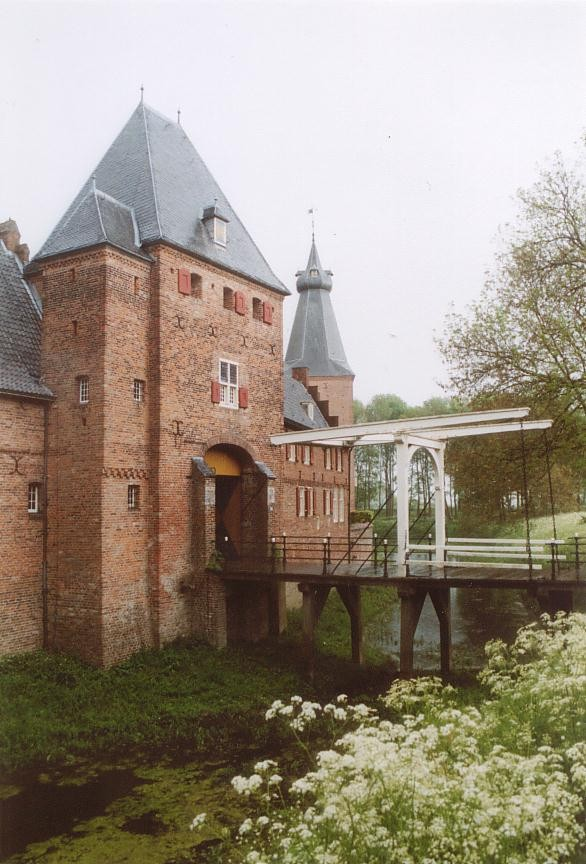
Main gate

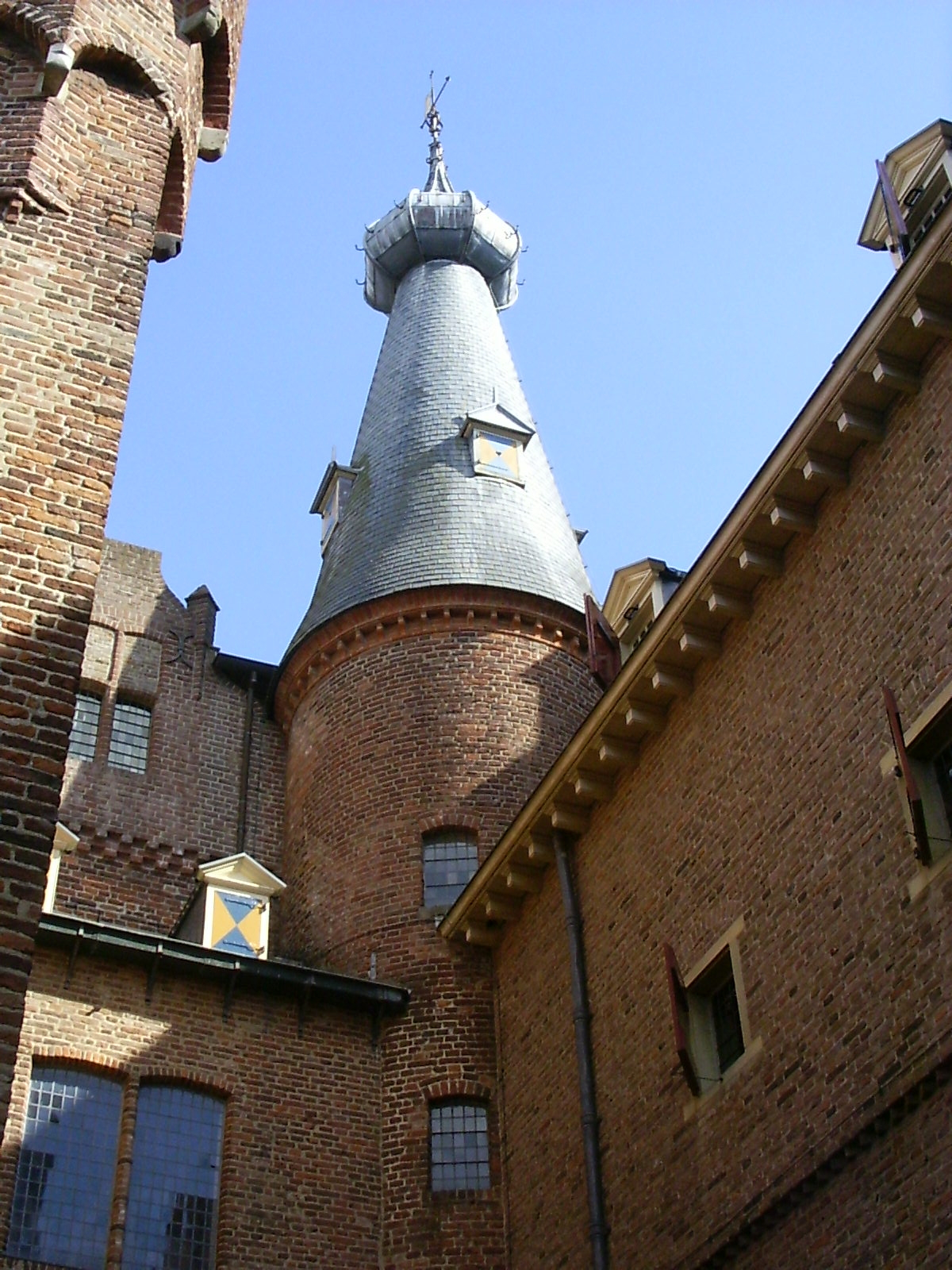
Castle tower

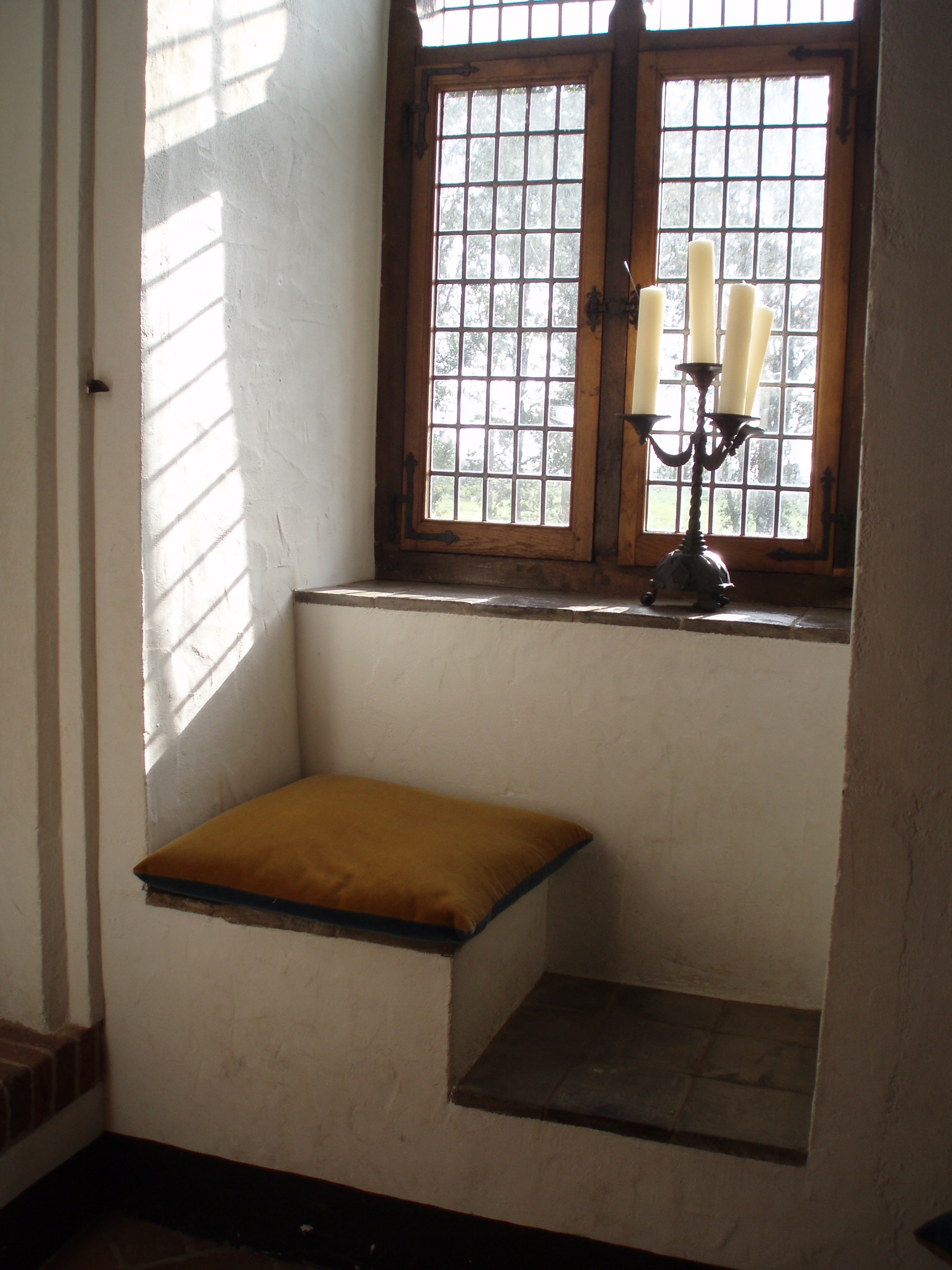
Inside the castle

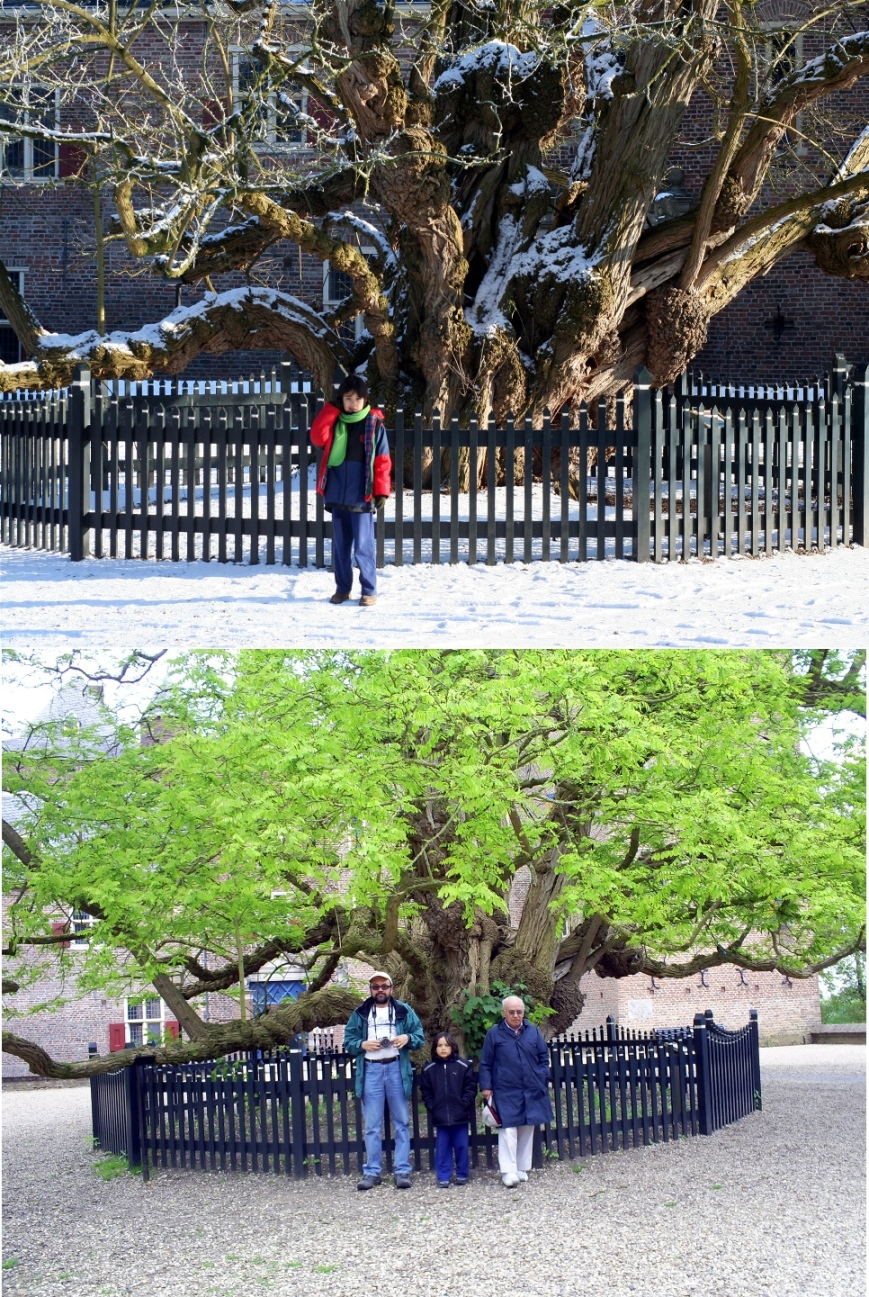
450-year-old Robinia pseudoacacia

== See also ==
- List of castles in the Netherlands
