= Nightwork Films =

Nightwork Films (a Dutch film production team consisting out of International Media and Entertainment Management students) has officially been founded on 21 October 2011. Their name, Nightwork Films, originates from when they were officially founded: in the middle of the night. As a sort of tradition, they regularly pull an all-nighter to finish their projects. The team was created to participate in the Entertainment Experience, a Dutch filmmaking competition held by world-famous director Paul Verhoeven, with the goal to make the first user generated movie ever.

== Crew ==
The crew consists of the following people:

- Producer, director and script writer: Henriëtte Drost
- Producer: Sebass van Boxel
- Director of Photography and camera operator: Marijn Hurkens
- Web designer and camera operator: Pascal Adriaansen
- Boom operator and sound editor: Bas Moerland
- Editor: Piet van Steen
- Floor manager and production assistant: Thomas de Bruin

== Entertainment Experience ==
Entertainment Experience is a film project in which two films are created. One user-generated film and one film made by Dutch director Paul Verhoeven.

The script consists of eight parts. Part one was written bij Kim van Kooten. The "crowd" (participators of the competition) will subsequently write the scripts for the seven following parts. Both Paul Verhoeven and the participating film crews will make their film based on those scripts. The process of making the film is shown in a TV show on Dutch channel 'Veronica'. The project was launched on 21 September 2011 and will end somewhere in May 2012.

Nightwork Films was created when the Entertainment Experience started in September 2011. They were the first film crew to enter the competition and upload an entry, two weeks before the first deadline. They started a successful marketing campaign which brought them their victory with 1182 voters. They won the first part of the competition and their entry will be used in the user-generated movie, which will premiere on 28 May 2012.

== Flawed ==
In October, 2011 Nightwork Films started with a new project: the short film: ‘Flawed,’ which they submitted in March, 2012 to the Cannes Film festival. For this project, three new members were added to the team: Director of Photography: Alessandra Scalora, Story developer and production assistant: Boudewijn Arbouw and Public Relations manager and production assistant: Josephien Jansen.

== Trivia ==
All the team members are students who study the International Media & Entertainment Management bachelor at the NHTV University of Applied Sciences in Breda, the Netherlands.
