= Ashley Miller (screenwriter) =

American screenwriter and producer

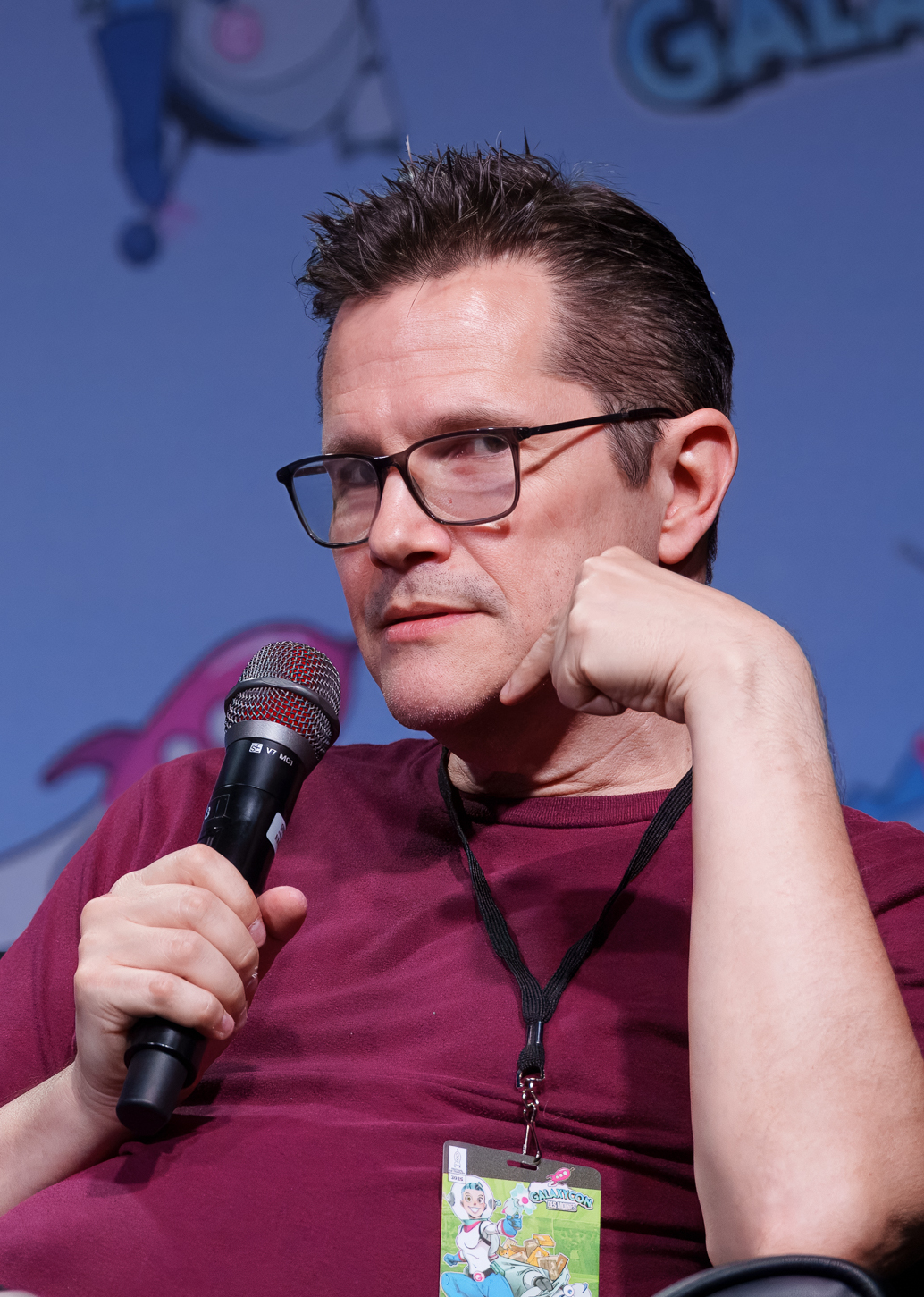
- Ashley Miller at Galaxy Con Des Moines 2025
- Born: Ashley Edward Miller; March 16, 1971 (age 55); Windber, Pennsylvania, U.S.
- Education: Thomas Jefferson High School for Science and Technology; College of William & Mary
- Occupations: Screenwriter, producer
- Years active: 2000–present
- Spouse: Jennifer Miller
- Children: Caden Miller

Ashley Edward Miller (born March 16, 1971) is an American screenwriter and producer best known for his work on the television series Andromeda, Terminator: The Sarah Connor Chronicles, Fringe, and Dota: Dragon's Blood. He also worked on the films Thor and X-Men: First Class.

== Personal life ==
Born in Windber, Pennsylvania, Miller's family relocated, and he grew up in Gainesville, Virginia. He was a member of the first graduating class at Thomas Jefferson High School for Science and Technology. His first job out of college was as a middle school English teacher. He then went on to work for the United States Navy as an independent defense contractor. Miller eventually moved to California, starting his career as a writer on the television series Andromeda after meeting one of the series' producers.

He is married and has one son.

== Career ==
Miller was first hired to work on Andromeda in 2000 as a writer. In 2001, he was given the additional duties of being a consultant on the series, working both positions until the series' cancellation in 2005. It was while working on the show that he first met former-journalist and future writing partner Zack Stentz.

Together with two other writers, Stentz and Miller co-wrote the screenplay for the 2003 film Agent Cody Banks.

The duo continued their writing partnership, working on The Twilight Zone revival. Upon the end of the television series Andromeda, they were put to work on the Fox Television series Terminator: The Sarah Connor Chronicles, co-writing six episodes and co-producing twenty-two episodes together over the series run. When Terminator: The Sarah Connor Chronicles was not renewed for a third season, Miller and Stentz moved onto another Fox project, Fringe. Over the two seasons that Miller and Stentz worked on the series, they co-produced twenty two episodes along with co-writing a total of four episodes.

In 2006, Disney purchased an original spec script written by Miller & Stentz entitled The Feynman Chronicles. Miller has stated the film was basically a "Bar Bet" between himself and Stentz.

In December 2009, Miller and Stentz were hired to write the screenplay adaptation for the Dark Horse Comics horror comic book mini-series Damn Nation. During an interview with I09, Miller stated, "We're still in the middle of working on Damn Nation. We turned our first draft into Dark Horse and Paramount Pictures, and everyone seems to love it. We were very pleased with how it came out."

After leaving Fringe in 2010, Miller and Stentz were hired to write the screenplay for the summer tent-pole live-action version of Thor.

Following their work on Thor, Miller and Stentz attended a meeting with Fox executives, who offered them the chance to work with producer Bryan Singer and director Matthew Vaughn by penning a draft of the screenplay for the film X-Men: First Class. After finishing the script and beginning production, both Miller and Stentz expressed their happiness with the tone of the film, complimenting the vision and scenes that Singer had conceived in an interview.

On November 8, 2012, Miller and Stentz released their first novel, Colin Fischer, a young adult story about a student with Asperger's Syndrome entering high school.

== Filmography ==
Film writer

- Agent Cody Banks (2003)
- Thor (2011)
- X-Men: First Class (2011)

Documentary appearance

- Movie Trailers: A Love Story (2020)

Television

Year	Title	Role	Notes
2001-2005	Andromeda	Consultant, story editor	As Ashley Edward Miller
2003	The Twilight Zone	Consulting producer, writer	As Ashley Edward Miller
2008-2009	Terminator: The Sarah Connor Chronicles	Co-producer, executive story editor, writer	As Ashley Edward Miller
2009-2010	Fringe	Producer, writer	
2013	Shelf Life	Writer	
2017	Black Sails	Consulting producer	
2021-2022	Dota: Dragon's Blood	Developer, executive producer, writer	As Ashley Edward Miller
