= Capsule Monsters =

Capsule Monsters may refer to:

- In the Yu-Gi-Oh! franchise:
  - Capsule Monster Chess or CapMon, a fictional board game that Mokuba Kaiba plays and forces Yugi Mutou to play twice
  - Yu-Gi-Oh!! Capsule Monsters, a twelve-episode mini-series in the Yu-Gi-Oh!! franchise produced by 4Kids Entertainment
- Capsule Monsters, a power used by the titular character in Ultra Seven
- Pokémon Red and Blue, whose working title was Capsule Monsters in 1990
