= Stutter Rap (No Sleep til Bedtime) =

Single by Morris Minor and the Majors
- B-side: "Another Boring B-Side"
- Released: 1987
- Genre: Comedy rap
- Length: 3:48
- Label: Ten Records
- Songwriter: Tony Hawks
- Producer: Grand Master Jelly Tot (Jakko Jakszyk)

Morris Minor and the Majors singles chronology
"Stutter Rap (No Sleep til Bedtime)" (1987)	"This Is the Chorus" (1988)

"Stutter Rap (No Sleep til Bedtime)" is a song by Morris Minor and the Majors, led by Tony Hawks. The song is a stylistic parody of the Beastie Boys, and the subtitle plays on their 1987 single "No Sleep till Brooklyn". The record sold 220,000 copies.

Hawks started out as a songwriter but was not successful, and instead became a comedian and writer.

He achieved some success as part of the act Morris Minor and the Majors, who had subsequently appeared on television and whose song "Stutter Rap" Virgin Records felt had potential as a novelty hit.

"Stutter Rap" went on to reach No. 4 in the UK Singles Chart, No. 14 in Canada and No. 2 in Australia. It was written by Hawks, and performed by him along with two others. In the video for the song, John Deacon (of Queen) makes an appearance, wearing a blue wig and playing guitar.

The song was coupled with "Another Boring B-Side", whose chorus simply repeated the line: "Very very very very very very boring".

Melody Maker reviewed the single with the four words "Stutter Rap, Utter Crap".

== Background ==
=== Recording ===
"Stutter Rap" was produced by Jakko Jakszyk (as "Grand Master Jelly Tot").

According to Jakszyk, the first attempt at mixing down the record from the multitrack recordings suffered from distortion due to a misalignment of the destination recorder, and it was planned to redo this later.

However, following a failed attempt to remix the song (which Jakszyk had disagreed with the need for), it transpired that the original multitracks had been partially wiped while in the hands of the remixer. This meant that any attempt to redo the original mixdown would have required re-recording most of the song from scratch.

As a result, Jakszyk resigned his services and the record company ultimately used the original rough mix for the released version.

=== Variants and 'Neighbours' theme ===
In its original form, "Stutter Rap" featured a brief two second sample of the theme to the TV series Neighbours at the 1:39 mark. Jakszyk commented that "We were later sued by [co-writer] Tony Hatch for doing so".

The version included as an additional track for some releases of follow-up single "This Is the Chorus" and on some compilations replaced this with a different and unidentified sample with female vocals.

== Charts ==
=== Weekly charts ===
Chart (1987–1988)	Peak position
Australia (Australian Music Report)	2
UK Singles (OCC)	4

=== Year-end charts ===
Chart (1988)	Position
Australia (ARIA)	21
