= Hippocrates Centre =

Medical institution in Chișinău, Moldova

The Hippocrates Centre is a day-care medical centre for disabled children that was established in Chişinău, Republic of Moldova, in 2000. It was founded with the support of Tony Hawks, the British writer and comedian, author of the best-seller "Playing the Moldovans at Tennis" and the support of the British philanthropic organization ChildAid.

The mission of the Hippocrates centre is to improve the quality of health of disabled children from marginalized families by improving their access to high-quality medical recovery services in order to facilitate their efficient integration into society.

The suffering caused by chronic conditions in children both to the children themselves and to their families has served as an incentive for founding this non-governmental, non-profit organisation for children with chronic diseases coming from socially vulnerable families, at a time when the Moldova is undergoing significant political and economic changes, while poverty levels have registered worrying levels. The crisis in the Moldovan healthcare system has made many specialists explore the possibility of non-pharmacological treatments, comparatively less expensive and yet relatively successful for the recovery/rehabilitation of patients with chronic conditions.

The main objectives of the Hippocrates Centre are: To provide medical recovery services to children with chronic conditions by means of non-invasive, low-cost treatment methods such as physical therapy, occupational therapy, massage therapy, electrotherapy, orthotics and speech therapy; Children from birth up to the age of 15 who have chronic neuromuscular, skeletal, cardiovascular or respiratory illnesses are treated. To provide parents and carers with educational services in regard to selection of efficient recovery and treatment methods appropriate for their child.
