= Tony Hawks =

British comedian and author (born 1960)

Tony Hawks MBE
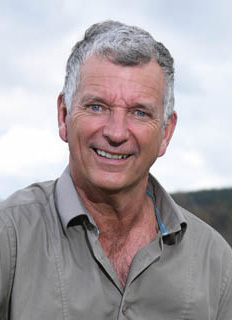
- Hawks in 2020
- Born: Antony Gordon Hawksworth; 27 February 1960 (age 66); Brighton, England
- Occupations: Comedian, author
- Years active: 1988–present
- Known for: Morris Minor and the Majors; "Stutter Rap (No Sleep Til Bedtime)"; Playing the Moldovans at Tennis; Round Ireland with a Fridge
- Website: tony-hawks.com

Antony Gordon Hawksworth MBE (born 27 February 1960), known professionally as Tony Hawks, is a British comedian and author.

== Early life ==
Born in Brighton, Sussex, Hawks was educated at Brighton, Hove and Sussex Grammar School and Brighton College.

== Career ==
After dropping out of a drama degree at the University of Manchester, Hawks appeared in the West End musical Lennon – A Musical Biography at The Astoria. By 1988, before he found chart success, he was already appearing in BBC Radio 4's Big Fun Show with Paul Merton, John Irwin and Josie Lawrence.

Hawks first attempted to break into show business as a singer-songwriter, but it was with a novelty record that he had his first brush with fame; as leader of the trio Morris Minor and the Majors, he reached No. 4 in the UK Singles Chart with the Beastie Boys parody, "Stutter Rap (No Sleep til Bedtime)" in 1988. It went on to sell 220,000 copies, and reached a peak of No. 2 in Australia. The follow-up, a pastiche of Stock Aitken Waterman titled "This Is the Chorus", fared less well. A television series followed from this, Morris Minor's Marvellous Motors, written by and starring Hawks. In it, the fictional bandleader attempted to maintain his pop career while running a garage; it ran for one series of six episodes in 1989 on BBC1.

Hawks performs stand-up comedy, and is a regular on television and radio panel games in the UK, including I'm Sorry I Haven't a Clue, Just a Minute, The Unbelievable Truth and Have I Got News for You, although he first came to prominence as a contributor to panel shows as one of two resident performers – the other being Jo Brand – on the BBC monologue show The Brain Drain.

In the first few series of Red Dwarf, Hawks performed a warm-up act for the live audience before recording began. Hawks has also appeared in Red Dwarf in a number of supporting roles, on several occasions as a voice artist for intelligent machines. Hawks provided the voice of a vending machine in "Future Echoes" and "Waiting for God" and the voice of a suitcase in "Stasis Leak"; later, he appeared on screen as The Guide in "Better Than Life", The Compere in "Backwards", and Caligula in "Meltdown". On 29 May 2009, Hawks featured in an episode of "Carpool", with his Red Dwarf co-star Robert Llewellyn. Craig Charles stated that Hawks was called the 4th/5th 'Dwarfer' due to his many appearances on the series. Hawks also provided the voice-over for a restaurant advertisement in the Red Dwarf episode "Me²", although this role was uncredited.

He has appeared as a pundit in the television series Grumpy Old Men and as a contestant on the BBC quiz show School's Out.

In November 2010, he was a guest on a number of television and radio programmes to discuss the film version of his book Round Ireland with a Fridge, including Simon Mayo's BBC Radio 2 show Loose Ends, BBC Radio Wales and BBC Radio Scotland. He was also a contestant on a special edition of Mastermind for Children in Need, and featured as part of Comic Relief in 2011.

In March 2011, Hawks travelled to Japan to appear at the Okinawa International Movie Festival where Round Ireland with a Fridge was nominated for Best Comedy. In late 2011, he completed his first national theatre tour for a decade, taking his one-man show, 'Random Fun' to 30 towns and cities around the UK. He was also a guest on many television and radio series during the tour, including BBC Breakfast and The Wright Stuff.

In August 2013, Hawks – along with many other comedians – appeared in the television adaptation of the radio series Just a Minute for its 45th anniversary.

== Books ==
Hawks has written seven books:

- Round Ireland with a Fridge (1998): His first book was an account of his attempt to hitchhike around Ireland with a fridge to win a bar bet. It had sold over 1 million copies as of April 2026.
- Playing the Moldovans at Tennis (2000): His second book, also the result of a drunken bet (with the comedian Arthur Smith), this time involved an attempt to beat each member of the Moldova national football team in a game of tennis, based on the theory that people good at one sport are not necessarily good at others.
- One Hit Wonderland (2002): His third book describes his attempt, over 10 years after his first, to write a second hit song. This culminates in him performing on Albanian television with Norman Wisdom and Tim Rice.
- A Piano in the Pyrenees: The Ups and Downs of an Englishman in the French Mountains (2006): An account of his purchase of a house in the Pyrenees in the south of France, after deciding that the two things he wanted in life were to meet his soulmate, and to purchase an "idyllic house abroad somewhere".
- The Fridge Hiker's Guide to Life (2008).
- Once Upon a Time in the West ... Country (2015).
- The A to Z of Skateboarding (2019). For more than twenty years, Tony Hawks has been mistaken for Tony Hawk, the American skateboarder. Even though it is abundantly clear on his website that he is an English comedian and author, people still write to him asking the best way to do a kickflip or land a melon and the new book contains his responses.

Hawks also contributed to the collection The Weekenders: Travels in the Heart of Africa (2001).

== Film adaptations ==
The full-length feature film version of his book Round Ireland with a Fridge, starring Hawks, Josie Lawrence, Ed Byrne and Sean Hughes, was released in 2010. The film was shot in London, west Wales, the Surrey Hills and Ireland in 2009. It was directed by Ed Bye and the producers were Tony Hawks, Simon Sharkey and Greg Macmanus, the cinematographer was John Sorapure and the film editor was Mark Wybourn. The film premiered at the Cambridge Film Festival and was released on DVD on 8 November 2010.

Playing the Moldovans at Tennis was released in 2012 and starred Hawks with Anatol Durbala, Steven Frost, Angus Deayton, Morwenna Banks and Laura Solon, with Pat Cash as the commentator. It was co-directed by Hawks and Mikolaj Jaroszewicz, cinematographer on the Oscar-winning Peter and the Wolf, and edited by Christopher White. Production design was by Edward Lidster and Vlad Lozovan, sound by Ludovic Lassare and lighting by Tim Jordan. It was the first British feature film to be made in Moldova, with additional filming in London, Belfast and Israel, and it premiered with a special charity screening at the Odeon West End in Leicester Square on 21 June 2012.

== Theatre ==
Hawks appeared in two West End productions in the 1980s as an actor/musician, Pump Boys and Dinettes and Lennon. He also acted in A Slight Case of Murder at The Nottingham Playhouse and in The Dice House at The Belgrade Theatre in Coventry.

He was a finalist for three consecutive years in the 1980s for the Vivian Ellis prize for Young Composers for the Musical Stage.

Hawks staged a special charity performance of his comedy musical Midlife Cowboy at the Lyric Theatre in London on 25 April 2016. It starred Hawks, Jack Dee, Doon Mackichan, Ben Miller, Alistair McGowan and Charlotte Page. Proceeds from the performance were donated to the Tony Hawks Care Home in Moldova. The full-length version of Midlife Cowboy opened at the Pleasance Theatre in London on 13 September 2019 starring Hawks, Debra Stephenson, Duncan Wisbey, James Thackeray and Georgina Fields.

== Other activities ==
Hawks donated half of the royalties from his book Playing the Moldovans at Tennis to a trust fund for Moldova, which was used to open the Hippocrates Centre, a medical centre that provides rehabilitative therapy for disabled children from socially vulnerable families. Hawks continues to support Hippocrates through fundraising and personal involvement and was appointed a Member of the Order of the British Empire (MBE) in the 2017 Birthday Honours 'for services to disadvantaged children in Moldova'. All profits from sales of the film also go to the centre. Proceeds from the film version of Playing the Moldovans at Tennis also go to the Care Home.

Hawks is the co-founder and public face of the 'Tennis for Free' campaign which aims to make Britain's existing municipal tennis facilities available to all.

Hawks won the British Actors Equity Tennis Tournament for three years running and collaborated with Chesney Hawkes between 2013 and 2018 on various songs available from a MySpace website.

Hawks is frequently confused with American professional skateboarder Tony Hawk, largely because the latter's video game franchise uses the possessive apostrophe ("Tony Hawk's"). Hawks maintains a list of emails intended for the skateboarder, and his mischievous responses to them, on his website. On 2 January 2008, he appeared on an edition of Celebrity Mastermind, with Tony Hawk as his chosen specialist subject.

In 2025 Hawks presented a radio programme called "Tony Hawks is Giving Nothing Away" on BBC Radio 4 on the subject of inheritance planning which discussed various options for wealthy English people.
