= List of Yu-Gi-Oh! chapters =

The first Japanese volume of Yu-Gi-Oh!, Puzzle of the Gods, released by Shueisha on March 4, 1997

The Yu-Gi-Oh! manga is written and illustrated by Kazuki Takahashi. It was originally serialized in Shueisha's Weekly Shōnen Jump from 1996 to 2004. The plot follows the story of a boy named Yugi Mutou who is given the ancient Millennium Puzzle, and awakes an alter-ego within his body, who helps him with any problem he is having using various games.

Shueisha collected the chapters in 38 tankōbon volumes; the first volume was released on March 4, 1997, and the last one on June 4, 2004. Shueisha republished the manga in twenty-two volumes from April 18, 2007, to March 18, 2008. In the United States, Viz Media serialized 14 volumes worth of the manga in Shonen Jump from December 3, 2002, to December 4, 2007. They also released the manga in volumes, but divided in three series. The first series, Yu-Gi-Oh!, includes the first seven volumes, and were released from May 7, 2003, to December 7, 2004. Yu-Gi-Oh!: Duelist includes volumes 8–31, and Yu-Gi-Oh!: Millenium World, the volumes 32–38. Both series started publication in 2005, and while the last volume from Duelist was released on December 4, 2007, Millenium World ended on February 5, 2008.

== Volumes ==
No.	Title	Original release date	English release date
1	The Puzzle of the Gods / The Millenium Puzzle; Kami no Pazuru (神のパズル)	March 4, 1997; 4-08-872311-2	May 7, 2003; 978-1-56931-903-1
Battle 1: "The Puzzle of the Gods" (神のパズル, Kami no Pazuru); Battle 2: "Lying Eyes" (偽りの目, Itsuwari no Me); Battle 3: "Hard Beat!!" (ハードビート！！, Hādo Bīto!!) / "Hard Beat!"; Battle 4: "Escaped Prisoner" (脱獄囚, Datsugokushū) / "Jail Break!"; Battle 5: "The False Prophet" (妙な予言者, Myō na Yogensha); Battle 6: "Into the Fire" (熱い死闘, Atsui Shitō); Battle 7: "The Face of Truth" (真実の顔, Shinjitsu no Kao)
Yugi Mutou, a high school boy with a fond of games, is attempting to solve the Millenium Puzzle, an ancient object given to him by his grandfather, Sugoroku Mutou. As he is doing it, two other boys, Katsuya Jonouchi and Hiroto Honda, take the box containing the pieces and begin tossing it back and forth. Finally Anzu Mazaki, one of Yugi's childhood friends, catches the box and chases the two bullies off. Yugi tells Anzu about the treasure and that he made a secret wish on it, not realizing that Jonouchi had stolen the final piece, and dropped it in a moat. Tetsu Ushio overhears and after school asks Yugi if anyone has been bullying him, with Yugi denying it. The next day after school, Ushio shows Yugi a badly beaten Jonouchi and Honda, and demands that he pay him for it. While trying to come up with a plan, Yugi gets farther than he ever has in solving the puzzle. Jonouchi arrives just in time to give Yugi's grandpa the final piece. When Yugi finally solves the puzzle, another being takes over Yugi's body. Yugi then challenges Ushio to a shadow game at school, resulting in Ushio facing a penalty game, in which he sees nothing but money. At school the next day, Jonouchi meets with Yugi, who had no memory of what happened after he solved the puzzle, and they become friends. Yugi then starts to face several people in different games.
2	The Cards with Teeth; Kiba o Motsu Kādo (牙を持つカード)	May 1, 1997; 4-08-872312-0	August 18, 2003; 978-1-59116-081-6
Battle 8: "The Poison Man" (毒の男, Doku no Otoko); Battle 9: "The Cards with Teeth (Part 1)" (牙を持つカード<前編>, Kiba o Motsu Kādo (Zenpen)); Battle 10: "The Cards with Teeth (Part 2)" (牙を持つカード<後編>, Kiba o Motsu Kādo (Kōhen)); Battle 11: "The Wild Gang (Part 1)" (キレた奴ら<前編>, Kireta Yatsura (Zenpen)); Battle 12: "The Wild Gang (Part 2)" (キレた奴ら<後編>, Kireta Yatsura (Kōhen)); Battle 13: "The Man from Egypt (Part 1)" (エジプトから来た神(おとこ)<前編>, Ejiputo kara Kita Otoko (Zenpen)); Battle 14: "The Man from Egypt (Part 2)" (エジプトから来た神(おとこ)<後編>, Ejiputo kara Kita Otoko (Kōhen)); Battle 15: "The Other Criminal" (もう一人の罪人, Mō Hitori no Zainin)
In the first chapter of the second volume, Jonouchi spends a large sum of money on a pair of shoes known as "Air Muscle", only to have the shoes taken from him by "Muscle Hunters", a group after rare shoes. This turns out to be a scam created by the shopkeeper to get money. Yami Yugi challenges the shopkeeper to a Shadow Game, whereupon the Shopkeeper ends up being stabbed by the scorpion he placed inside the shoe. Then, Sugoroku introduces "Magic & Wizards" (later changed to "Duel Monsters") to Jonouchi and Anzu, which, while popular in America, has been gaining a following in Japan. Seto Kaiba then arrives in the Game Store, and offers a large amount of trading cards for Sugoroku's Blue-Eyes White Dragon, which he refuses. Kaiba then tricks Yugi into giving him the Blue-Eyes when he brings it to school. Yami then challenges him to a Shadow Game where the monsters in the game come to life. Kaiba manages to summon Sugoroku's Blue-Eyes, but it instead sacrifices itself as Kaiba did not understand its heart. Kaiba loses, and then is subjected to a Penalty Game where he is trapped in an illusion where he believes he is surrounded by monsters. Afterward, Jonouchi's former gang leader Hirutani comes back and demands that he rejoins his gang otherwise he would beat all of his classmates at Domino High. Jonouchi initially agrees until a gang member injures Yugi, who was pleading with Jonouchi to come with them. The gang then ties Jonouchi up and begins to torture him with tasers. Using the power of the Millennium Puzzle, Yami was able to find Jonouchi and defeat the gang by getting them soaked in rainwater and using one of their own tasers against them. Lastly, a museum exhibit with recently found Egyptian artifacts comes to Japan, and the man who discovers them, Professor Yoshimori, invites his friend Sugoroku (along with Yugi and company) to see the exhibit for free. The curator of the museum then tricks Yugi into giving him the Millennium Puzzle, which he intends to sell. However, he ends up murdered in a Shadow Game by Shadi, the owner of both the Millennium Scale and Key. Yugi then runs into Shadi, who is surprised to learn that he is the one who solves the Millennium Puzzle. He uses the Millennium Key to peer into his soul, where he finds Yami, who submits him to a Shadow Game and wins. Defeated, Shadi then leaves to punish Professor Yoshimori, and finds that he knows Yugi. Wanting to have a rematch with Yami, Shadi brainwashes Yoshimori with the Millennium Key and forces him to attack Yugi's friends in an attempt to bait Yami Yugi out.
3	Capsule Monster Chess! / Capsule Monster Chess; Kapuseru Monsutā Chesu! (カプセル・モンスター・チェス！)	July 4, 1997; 4-08-872313-9	November 19, 2003; 978-1-59116-179-0
Battle 16: "Shadi's Challenge" (シャーディーの挑発, Shādī no Chōhatsu); Battle 17: "Game Start!!" (ゲーム開始(スタート)！！, Gēmu Sutāto!!) / "Game Start!!"; Battle 18: "Second Game" (第2の試練(ゲーム), Dai Ni no Gēmu) / "Second Stage"; Battle 19: "Final Game" (最終試練(ファイナルゲーム), Fainaru Gēmu) / "Final Stage"; Battle 20: "Conclusion" (決着, Ketchaku) / "Game Over"; Battle 21: "Digital Pet Showdown" (デジタルペット対決, Dejitaru Petto Taiketsu) / "Digital Pet Duel"; Battle 22: "American Hero (Part 1)" (アメリカン・ヒーロー<前編>, Amerikan Hīrō (Zenpen)); Battle 23: "American Hero (Part 2)" (アメリカン・ヒーロー<後編>, Amerikan Hīrō (Kōhen)); Battle 24: "Capsule Monster Chess!" (カプセル・モンスター・チェス！, Kapuseru Monsutā Chesu!)
Shadi's Challenge - Conclusion: Desiring to discover the Millennium Puzzle's true power, with the Millennium Scales and the Millennium Key, Shadi summons deadly Shadow Game trials that, if Dark Yugi can't successfully pass them, will kill his best friends.
4	Project Start!! / Kaiba's Revenge; Purojekuto Sutāto!! (計画(プロジェクト)始動(スタート)！！)	September 4, 1997; 4-08-872314-7	February 18, 2004; 978-1-59116-185-1
Battle 25: "The One-Inch Terror" (1インチの恐怖, Wan Inchi no Kyōfu); Battle 26: "Russian Roulette of Death" (死のロシアン・ルーレット, Shi no Roshian Rūretto) / "Russian Roulette"; Battle 27: "Project Start!!" (計画(プロジェクト)始動(スタート)！！, Purojekuto Sutāto!!) / "Project Start!"; Battle 28: "The First Battlefield" (第一の戦場(バトルフィールド), Dai Ichi no Batorufīrudo) / "Arena #1"; Battle 29: "Shooting Stardust" (シューティング・スターダスト, Shūtingu Sutādasuto); Battle 30: "Don't Make a Sound!!" (声を出すな！！, Koe o Dasu na!!) / "Don't Make a Sound!"; Battle 31: "Murderer's Mansion" (殺人の館(マーダーズマンション), Mādāzu Manshon); Battle 32: "Chainsaw Deathmatch!!" (チェンソーデスマッチ！！, Chensō Desumatchi!!); Battle 33: "Cubes of Fear!!!" (正方形の恐怖！！！, Seihōkei no Kyōfu!!!) / "Terror Cubed!!!"
Seto Kaiba, who lost a Shadow Game of Magic & Wizards (changed to Duel Monsters in the English version of the manga) to Dark Yugi for stealing his grandfather's precious Blue-Eyes White Dragon card, suffered a Penalty Game in which he experienced a sensation similar to death, and suffered nightmares from it thereafter. Begrudged over the loss and humiliation, he decided to build a deranged theme park called Death-T, designed to enact revenge on Yugi by killing him with deadly games. Luring Yugi's grandfather, Sugoroku Mutou, into a virtual version of the game, he defeats the old game master with three Blue-Eyes White Dragons and tears up his precious card. When Kaiba tortures Sugoroku with an artificial Penalty Game and threatens his life, Yugi and his friends are forced to partake in Kaiba's deadly games in order to save him. The games are a laser gunfght, a coaster which can electrocute those who make any noise, a timed game in which Yugi's friends' hands will get chopped up if he doesn't figure out a riddle, a chainsaw deathmatch and a room with falling cubes. Yugi's friends, except for Honda, who had "disappeared" during the falling cube game, successfully beat these challenges.
5	The Terror of Blue Eyes!! / The Heart of the Cards; Burūaizu no Kyōfu!! (青眼(ブルーアイズ)の恐怖！！)	November 4, 1997; 4-08-872315-5	May 19, 2004; 978-1-59116-324-4
Battle 34: "The Second Arena!!!" (第2の闘技場!!!, Dai Ni no Tōgijō!!!) / "Arena #2"; Battle 35: "Board Game Deathmatch" (盤上の死闘, Banjō no Shitō); Battle 36: "Last Battle of Uncertainty" (無常のラストバトル, Mujō no Rasuto Batoru) / "Battle Beyond Hope"; Battle 37: "Deathmatch!!" (死闘！！, Shitō!!) / "To the Death!!"; Battle 38: "The Terror of Blue Eyes!!" (青眼(ブルーアイズ)の恐怖！！, Burūaizu no Kyōfu!!); Battle 39: "End of the Deathmatch!!" (死闘の果て！！, Shitō no Hate!!) / "Endgame!!"; Battle 40: "1 Piece of Heart" (心の1片, Kokoro no Ippen) / "A Piece of His heart"; Battle 41: "Let's find "Love"!!" ("恋"を見つけよう！！, "Koi" o Mitsukeyō!!) / "Let's Find "Love"!"; Battle 42: "Get the 1,000,000 Yen!!" (100万円をゲットせよ！！, Hyakuman'yen o Getto Seyo!!) / "Get the Million!!"
The Second Arena - 1 Piece of Heart: Yugi tells his friends about his "other self" before facing Mokuba in a rematch of Capsule Monster Chess. He saves Mokuba from the penalty game Kaiba set up, and the other Yugi faces Kaiba in a Magic & Wizards rematch. After a few turns, Kaiba used his three blue-eyes combo he used against Yugi's grandpa. The other Yugi gathers all the cards needed, the parts of Exodia, the Forbidden One, to beat Kaiba. He uses a "mind crush" on Kaiba, in which Kaiba will slowly rebuild his heart.
6	Monster Fight!! / Monster Fight! Monsutā Faito!! (モンスターファイト！！)	January 9, 1998; 4-08-872505-0	September 7, 2004; 978-1-59116-471-5
Battle 43: "Monster Fight!! (Part 1)" (モンスターファイト！！ <前編>, Monsutā Faito!! (Zenpen)); Battle 44: "Monster Fight!! (Part 2)" (モンスターファイト！！ <後編>, Monsutā Faito!! (Kōhen)); Battle 45: "13:00 Terror!" (13の恐怖！！, Jūsan no Kyōfu!!) / "13 O'clock Terror!!"; Battle 46: "The Evil Dragon Cards (Part 1)" (魔の龍札(ドラゴン・カード)<前編>, Ma no Doragon Kādo (Zenpen)); Battle 47: "The Evil Dragon Cards (Part 2)" (魔の龍札(ドラゴン・カード)<後編>, Ma no Doragon Kādo (Kōhen)); Battle 48: "Jonouchi!! Soul Battle!! (Part 1)" (城之内！！ 魂のバトル！！ <前編>, Jōnouchi!! Tamashī no Batoru!! (Zenpen)); Battle 49: "Jonouchi!! Soul Battle!! (Part 2)" (城之内！！ 魂のバトル！！ <後編>, Jōnouchi!! Tamashī no batoru!! (Kōhen)); Battle 50: "Millenium Enemy 1: The Mysterious Transfer Student" (千年の敵1 -謎の転校生-, Sennen no Teki Ichi: Nazo no Tenkōsei); Battle 51: "Millenium Enemy 2: Monster World" (千年の敵2 -モンスター・ワールド-, Sennen no Teki Ni: Monsutā Wārudo)
Ryo Bakura, a fan of tabletop role-playing games, is a new transfer student at Domino City High, and quickly befriends Yugi Mutou and the rest of his friends. However, Bakura has a dark secret, he is also the owner of a Millennium Item, the Millennium Ring, and like Yugi, has another personality dwelling within him called Dark Bakura, who has been turning every game he plays into Shadow Games and putting Ryo's friends in a coma by putting their souls within miniature figures using Penalty Games; causing Ryo to constantly transfer schools and lose friends. Fearing for the safety of his new friends, he insists that they shouldn't play games together. Despite his plea, Yugi and his other pals come to Bakura's house to play his favorite Monster World game in order to cheer him up. Desiring to take Yugi's Millennium Puzzle, Dark Bakura turns this friendly tabletop RPG into a Shadow Game, trapping the souls of Yugi and his friends into their RPG miniatures. However, Dark Yugi takes over Yugi's body at the last second and the battle to free their new friend and their souls commence as they adventure into the Monster World campaign.
7	Millenium Enemy / Monster World; Sennen no Teki (千年の敵)	March 4, 1998; 4-08-872530-1	December 7, 2004; 978-1-59116-613-9
Battle 52: "Millenium Enemy 3: Monster World" (千年の敵3 -モンスター・ワールド-, Sennen no Teki San: Monsutā Wārudo) / "Millenium Enemy 3: The Fumble of Doom"; Battle 53: "Millenium Enemy 4: Role-Playing Dolls" (千年の敵4 -役割の人形-, Sennen no Teki Shi: Yakuwari no Ningyō) / "Millenium Enemy 4: Role-Playing Miniatures"; Battle 54: "Millenium Enemy 5: Stop the Run of Criticals!" (千年の敵5 -連続クリティカルを阻止せよ!-, Chitose no Teki Go: Renzoku Kuritikaru o Soshi Seyo!); Battle 55: "Millenium Enemy 6: The Traps of Zorc Castle" (千年の敵6 -ゾーク城の罠-, Sennen no Teki Roku: Zōku-jō no Wana); Battle 56: "Millenium Enemy 7: I'll Fight Too!" (千年の敵7 -僕も闘う!-, Sennen no Teki Nana: Boku mo Tatakau!); Battle 57: "Millenium Enemy 8: Battle! Battle!!" (千年の敵8 -バトル! バトル!!-, Sennen no Teki Hachi: Batoru! Batoru!!) / "Millenium Enemy 8: Fight! Fight!!"; Battle 58: "Millenium Enemy 9: The White Wizard Bakura" (千年の敵9 -白魔導士バクラ-, Sennen no Teki Kyū: Shiro Madōshi Bakura); Battle 59: "Millenium Enemy 10: Miracle Dice Roll" (千年の敵10 -奇跡のダイス・ロール-, Chitose no Teki Jū: Kiseki no Daisu Rōru) / "Millenium Enemy 10: The Last Die Roll"; Battle 60: "Challenge!!!" (挑戦！！！, Chōsen!!!) / "Challenge!"
Millenium Enemy: Yugi & his friends succeed in beating the RPG & the spirit of the ring. Challenge!!!: Magic & Wizards has gotten popular, but Jonouchi still hasn't improved his skills. Yugi looks at his deck, and tells him that he needs monster AND magic/trap cards to have a strong deck. After school, Yugi and co. receive a package containing a video tape, a glove, and two star chips. The gang play the tape, and it comes with a surprise. The creator, Pegasus J. Crawford (changed to Maximillion J. Pegasus in the English version), challenges Yugi to a game of Magic & Wizards, and Yugi accepts. The other Yugi takes over from there.
8	Duel Start!! / Duelist Kingdom; Dyueru Kaishi!! (決闘(デュエル)開始！！)	May 1, 1998; 4-08-872567-0	February 1, 2005; 978-1-59116-614-6
Battle 61: "Don't Draw That Card!!" (そのカードを引くな！！, Sono Kādo o Hiku na!!); Battle 62: "Countdown!!" (カウントダウン！！, Kauntodaun!!); Battle 63: "I Won't Lose!!" (負けられない！！, Makerarenai!!); Battle 64: "Fate of the Ocean!!" (洋上の因縁！！, Yōjō no Innen!!) / "Fate on the High Seas!!"; Battle 65: "Duel Start!!" (決闘(デュエル)開始！！, Dyueru Kaishi!!) / "Let the Duel Begin!"; Battle 66: "Trap!!" (罠！！, Wana!!) / "The Trap"; Battle 67: "The Ultimate Perfect Appearance!!" (究極完全態！！, Kyūkyoku Kanzentai!!) / "The Ultimate Great Moth"; Battle 68: "Devil Shock" (魔の電撃, Ma no Dengeki) / "Demon Lightning"; Battle 69: "Evil Woman" (魔性の女, Mashō no Onna) / "The Siren"
The other Yugi continues his match with Pegasus, but is defeated by a time limit. Pegasus takes Sugoroku's soul, and the only way to get him back is if Yugi beats Pegasus on his private island - Duelist Kingdom. Jonouchi tells the gang about his blind sister, Shizuka Kawai, and the reason he too is entering the tournament - to get the money to pay for her eye surgery. Anzu, Honda and Bakura manage to get on board with Yugi and Jonouchi, and Yugi and Jonouchi meet on the ship Mai Kujaku, Insector Haga and Dinosaur Ryuzaki. Unfortunately, a moment with Yugi and Haga alone causes Yugi to lose cards vital for using Exodia. The other Yugi then takes over from that point on. Pegasus explains the rules for the tournament known as the Duelist Kingdom tournament. Yugi duels Haga, betting his single star chip and his life, while Haga bets two of his star chips. After a few turns, Mai joins the gang to watch. After even more time passes, Yugi wins the duel and takes the star chips.
9	The Legendary Dragon!! / The Puppet Master; Densetsu no Doragon!! (伝説の竜(ドラゴン)！！)	August 4, 1998; 4-08-872591-3	March 1, 2005; 978-1-59116-716-7
Battle 70: "Things that Don't Change" (変わらぬもの, Kawaranu Mono); Battle 71: "Fear of the Sea" (海の恐怖, Umi no Kyōfu) / "The Scourage of the Sea"; Battle 72: "Sea Attack" (海が襲う, Umi ga Osou) / "Attack from the Deep"; Battle 73: "Thief!!?" (盗賊！！？, Tōzoku!!?) / "The Thief"; Battle 74: "Messenger from Hell?" (地獄よりの使者？, Jigoku Yori no Shisha?) / "Messenger From Hell"; Battle 75: "The Cards Bare Their Teeth" (牙をむくカード, Kiba o Muku Kādo); Battle 76: "The Legendary Dragon" (伝説の竜(ドラゴン)！！, Densetsu no Doragon); Battle 77: "I'll Win by Myself!!" (この手で勝つ！！, Kono-te de Katsu!!) / "On My Own!"; Battle 78: "I Won't Lose!!" (負けるかっ！！, Makeru ka') / "I Won't Lose!"
10	A Storm Strikes in the Kingdom!! / The Player Killer of Darkness; Ōkoku ni Arashi Fuku!! (王国に嵐吹く！！)	October 2, 1998; 4-08-872616-2	April 5, 2005; 978-1-59116-771-6
Battle 79: "Time Ticking!!" (時を刻め！！, Toki o Kizame!!) / "The Ticking Clock!"; Battle 80: "The Man Who Came with the Night" (夜とともに来た男, Yoru to Tomo ni Kita Otoko) / "The Night Intruder"; Battle 81: "Invisible Cards!!" (見えないカード！！, Mienai Kādo!!) / "The Invisible Cards"; Battle 82: "Defeat the Darkness!!" (闇をぶっとばせ！！, Yami o Buttobase!!) / Defeat the Darkness!; Battle 83: "Pursuit of Light!!" (光の追撃！！, Hikari no Tsuigeki!!) / "Swords of Light"; Battle 84: "A Storm Strikes in the Kingdom!!" (王国に嵐吹く！！, Ōkoku ni Arashi Fuku!!) / "A Storm in the Kingdom"; Battle 85: "Duel of Honor" (決闘(デュエル)の貴公子, Dyueru no Kikōshi) / "Duelist's Honor"; Battle 86: "New Weapon Capability!!" (新武器の実力！！, Arata Buki no Jitsuryoku!!) / "The Secret Weapon"; Battle 87: "The Terror of Pegasus!!" (ペガサスの恐怖！！, Pegasasu no Kyōfu!!) / "The Terror of Pegasus!"
11	Duel Without End / Dungeon of Doom; Owaranai Dyueru (終わらない決闘(デュエル))	January 8, 1999; 4-08-872661-8	May 3, 2005; 1-59116-759-0
Battle 88: "Darkness Assailant" (暗闇の襲撃者, Kurayami no Shūgeki-sha) / "The Lurking Duelists"; Battle 89: "Duel Without End" (終わらない決闘(デュエル), Owaranai Dyueru); Battle 90: "Call of the Grave" (墓場からの呼び声, Hakaba kara no Yobigoe); Battle 91: "Immortal Death?!" (滅びる不死！？, Horobiru Fushi!?) / "Death to the Undead!"; Battle 92: "Attack of the Labyrinth!!" (襲いくる迷宮！！, Osoikuru Meikyū!!) / "Enter the Labyrinth!"; Battle 93: "Deathmatch!! The Labyrinth's Unknown Trap!!" (死闘！！迷宮の未知の罠！！, Shitō!! Meikyū no Michi no Wana!!) / "Deathtrap Dungeon!"; Battle 94: "The Magic of the Labyrinth!!" (迷宮の魔術！！, Meikyū no Majutsu!!) / "The Magic of the Maze!"; Battle 95: "Dungeon of Terror" (恐怖の洞窟(ダンジョン), Kyōfu no Danjon) / "The Terror of the Dungeon"; Battle 96: "The Terror of the Fiend!!" (魔神の恐怖！！, Majin no Kyōfu!!) / "The Deadly Guardian!!"
12	A Harsh Duel / Blue-Eyes Ultimate Dragon; Kakokuna Dyueru (苛酷な決闘(デュエル))	March 4, 1999; 4-08-872687-1	May 31, 2005; 978-1-59116-811-9
Battle 97: "The Final Card!!" (最後の札(カード)！！, Saigo no Kādo!!) / "The Final Card"; Battle 98: "Which One!!" (どっちだ！！, Dotchida!!) / "Choose Wisely!"; Battle 99: "The Final Area" (最後のかけら, Saigo no Kakera) / "The Last Piece"; Battle 100: "Decisive Battle!! Duel Disk!!" (決戦！！決闘盤(デュエル・ディスク)！！, Kessen!! Dyueru Disuku!!) / "Duel Disk Battle!"; Battle 101: "Seesawing!!" (一進一退！！, Isshin Ittai!!) / "Advance and Retreat"; Battle 102: "Close Fight!!" (つばぜり合い！！, Tsuba Zeriai!!) / "A Close Fight!"; Battle 103: "Hang in There!!" (持ちこたえろ！！, Mochi Kotaero!!) / "Hang in There!"; Battle 104: "True Crisis!!" (真の危機！！, Shin no Kiki!!) / "Crisis!"; Battle 105: "A Harsh Duel" (苛酷な決闘(デュエル), Kakokuna Dyueru) / "No Mercy"
13	Fear of the Champion!! / The Terror of Toon World; Ōja no Kyōfu!! (王者の恐怖！！)	April 30, 1999; 4-08-872715-0	July 5, 2005; 978-1-59116-856-0
Battle 106: "Another Person's Courage" (もう一人の勇気, Mō Hitori no Yūki) / "Another Kind of Courage"; Battle 107: "To the Castle!" (城へ！！, Shiro e!!); Battle 108: "The Beginning of Fear!!" (恐怖開始！！, Kyōfu Kaishi!!) / "The First Stages of Fear"; Battle 109: "Fear of the Champion!!" (王者の恐怖！！, Ōja no Kyōfu!!) / "The Deadly Duelist King"; Battle 110: "Toons Attack!!" (トゥーンが襲う！！, Toūn ga Osou!!) / "Toons Attack!"; Battle 111: "Unwavering determination!!" (揺るがぬ決意！！, Yuruganu Ketsui!!) / "The Promise"; Battle 112: "The Eve of Battle" (決戦前夜, Kessen Zenya); Battle 113: "Swirling Night!!" (夜 渦まく！！, Yoru Uzumaku!!) / "Stealth in the Night!"; Battle 114: "Mai's Seduction!!" (幻惑の舞！！, Genwaku no Mai!!) / "The Bewitching Mai"
14	Betting to Win!! / Heavy Metal Raiders; Shōri e no Kake!! (勝利への賭け！！)	July 2, 1999; 4-08-872733-9	August 2, 2005; 978-1-59116-877-5
Battle 115: "The Beautiful Trap!!" (美しき罠！！, Utsukushiki Wana!!) / "The Beautiful Trap!"; Battle 116: "Find Yourself!!" (自分を見つけろ！！, Jibun o Mitsukero!!) / "Find Yourself!"; Battle 117: "Running on the Last Minute!!" (ギリギリを駆けろ！！, Girigiri o Kakero!!) / "Running on the Edge!"; Battle 118: "The Legendary Swordsman" (伝説の剣闘士, Densetsu no Kentōshi); Battle 119: "Because We're Friends" (仲間だから, Nakama Dakara); Battle 120: "Heavy Metal Raiders" (鋼鉄(ヘビーメタル)の襲撃者(レイダース), Hebīmetaru no Reidāsu); Battle 121: "Approaching Machine" (迫りくる機械(マシーン), Semarikuru Mashīn) / "Rise of the Machines"; Battle 122: "Betting to Win!!" (勝利への賭け！！, Shōri e no Kake!!) / "Betting to Win!"; Battle 123: "The Final Turn!!" (最後のターン！！, Saigo no Tān!!)
15	Mind Battle!! / Yugi vs. Pegasus; Kokoro no Tatakai!! (心の闘い！！)	October 4, 1999; 4-08-872772-X	September 6, 2005; 978-1-59116-998-7
Battle 124: "At That Time!!" (その時！！, Sono Toki!!) / "It's Time!"; Battle 125: "Being Read!?" (読まれてる！？, Yoma Reteru!?) / "Seen Through!?"; Battle 126: "Fighting Back Impossible!!" (反撃不能！！, Hangeki Funō!!) / "The Perfect Defense"; Battle 127: "The Impossible Challenge!!" (不可能への挑戦！！, Fukanō e no Chōsen!!) / "Do the Impossible!"; Battle 128: "Toon World Strategy!!" (トゥーン・ワールド攻略！！, Toūn Wārudo Kōryaku!!) / "The Downfall of Toon World"; Battle 129: "The Deadly Sacrifice!" (死への生け贄！, Shi e no Ikenie!) / "The Sacrifice!"; Battle 130: "Mind Battle!!" (心の闘い！！, Kokoro no Tatakai!!) / "Heart to Heart"; Battle 131: "Strike of Chaos!!" (混沌の一撃！！, Konton no Ichigeki!!) / "Attack of Chaos"; Battle 132: "Sorrow of the Millenium Eye" (悲しみの千年眼(ミレニアム・アイ), Kanashimi no Mireniamu Ai) / "The Tragic Tale of the Millenium Eye"; Battle 133: "The Precious Piece" (大切なピース, Taisetsuna Pīsu)
16	D.D.D.!! / Dungeon Dice Monsters; Dī. Dī. Dī.!! (D・D・D！！)	December 22, 1999; 4-08-872807-6	October 10, 2005; 978-1-4215-0052-2
Battle 134: "The New Game" (新(ニュー)遊戯(ゲーム), Nyū Gēmu); Battle 135: "Set-Up Trap" (仕組まれた罠, Shikumimareta Wana) / "Rigged!"; Battle 136: "D.D.D.!!" (D・D・D！！, Dī. Dī. Dī.!!) / "D.D.M."; Battle 137: "The Path of Darkness!!" (暗闇の道！！, Kurayami no Michi!!) / "The Path of Darkness!"; Battle 138: "Dungeon Crisis!!" (ダンジョンクライシス！！, Danjon Kuraishisu!!); Battle 139: "Rare VS Rare!!" (レアVSレア, Rea Bāsasu Rea!!) / "Rare vs. Rare!"; Battle 140: "The Broken Bond!!" (壊れた絆！！, Kowareta Kizuna!!) / "The Broken Bond"; Battle 141: "The Calling of the Powers" (呼び合う力, Yobiau Chikara); Battle 142: "Solve the Puzzle!!" (パズルを解け！！, Pazaru o Hodoke!!)
A new game shop called the Black Clown opens across the street from Yugi's house, the Kame Game shop. Advertising a new game abbreviated "DDD" (changed to "DDM" in the English version of the manga), Yugi and his friends decide to try out the new game on their free time. But unbeknownst to Yugi, Jonouchi, Anzu, Honda, and Bakura, the owner of the new shop is Mr. Clown, who lost a Shadow Game called the Devil's Board Game to Sugoroku Mutou long ago, losing his youth and becoming disfigured as a Penalty Game in a competition for the Millennium Puzzle. Raising his son to be a master gamer in order to enact revenge by beating Sugoroku's grandson, new classmate Ryuji Otogi starts causing trouble for Yugi and his friends with his bar bet games as he plans to take revenge for his father using a game of his own creation, Dragons, Dice & Dungeons (changed to Dungeon Dice Monsters in the English version of the manga), in order to take the title of "Game King" as well as the Millennium Puzzle.
17	The Lost Cards / The Egyptian God Cards; Ushinawareshi Kādo (失われしカード)	March 3, 2000; 4-08-872835-1	November 8, 2005; 978-1-4215-0078-2
Battle 143: "Battle with 0 Attack Power!!" (攻撃力0の戦い！！, Kōgeki Ryoku Zero no Tatakai!!) / "Zero Attack?!"; Battle 144: "Location of Revenge" (復讐の行方, Fukushū no Yukue) / "The Room of Revenge"; Battle 145: "Chain of Bonds" (鎖の絆, Kusari no Kizuna) / "Chains"; Battle 146: "The Ancient Stone" (古の石版, Inishie no Sekiban); Battle 147: "The Lost Cards" (失われしカード, Ushinawareshi Kādo); Battle 148: "The Card as Fierce as God" (鬼神のごときカード, Kijin no Gotoki Kādo) / "The God of the Obelisk"; Battle 149: "Where I Belong" (自分の場所, Jibun no Basho); Battle 150: "The Gathering" (集いし者共, Tsudoishi Monodomo); Battle 151: "Rare Hunter!!" (レアハンター！！, Rea Hantā!!) / "Rare Hunters!"
18	Millenium Battle!! / The Shadow Of Marik; Mireniamu Batoru!! (千年の闘い(ミレニアム・バトル)！！)	April 28, 2000; 4-08-872860-2	December 6, 2005; 978-1-4215-0150-5
Battle 152: "Battle City Begins!!" (BC(バトル・シティ)を駆けろ！！, Batoru Shiti o Kakero!!) / "Battle City Begins!"; Battle 153: "Unforgivable Person!!" (奴を許すな！！, Yatsu o Yurusu na!!) / "Duel of Vengeance!"; Battle 154: "Crumbling Deck!?" (崩れゆくデッキ！？, Kuzureyuku Dekki!?) / "To Destroy a Deck"; Battle 155: "Millennium Battle!!" (千年の闘い(ミレニアム・バトル)！！, Mireniamu Batoru!!) / "Millennium Battle"; Battle 156: "Attack the Psychic Powers!!" (超能力を撃て！！, Chōnōryoku o Ute!) / "Esper Roba"; Battle 157: "Psycho Deck Onslaught!!" (サイコデッキ猛攻！！, Saiko Dekki Mōkō!!) / "Psycho Deck!"; Battle 158: "A Brave Gamble!!" (勇気ある賭け！！, Yūkiaru Kake!!) / "A Brave Gamble!"; Battle 159: "Behold the God!!" (神を見よ！！, Kami o Miyo!!) / "Behold the God!"; Battle 160: "Marik Moves!!" (マリク動く！！, Mariku Ugoku!!) / "Marik Strikes!"
One day, Seto Kaiba meets Ishizu Ishtar, holder of the Millennium Tauk, at the Domino City Museum and learns that the game of Duel Monsters was based on a Shadow Game played long ago by an Egyptian Dynasty ruled over by a nameless Pharaoh who resembled his rival Yugi Mutou, and that an organization of thieves and bootleggers ("the Ghouls of the gaming underworld") robbed Ishizu of two of three God Cards that were made to be the strongest monsters in the game by Pegasus, based on the gods depicted on the stone tablet. In order to lure them out, Ishizu gives Kaiba the "God of Obelisk" and manipulates him into opening the Battle City tournament to lure them out. At the same time, Dark Yugi finally learns of his true origins, that he is the spirit of an ancient Egyptian Pharaoh trapped in the Millennium Puzzle for thousands of years, and that the key to regaining his lost memory is to fight in the Battle City tournament. However, the owner of the last Millennium Item, the Millennium Rod, is the leader of the Ghouls, and has a vendetta against the nameless king and plans to kill him.
19	Magic Battle!! / Magician vs. Magician; Majutsu Sen!! (魔術戦！！)	July 4, 2000; 4-08-872884-X	January 3, 2006; 978-1-4215-0207-6
Battle 161: "Ultimate Duel!!" (極限決闘(デュエル)！！, Kyokugen Dyueru!!) / "The Fatal Duel!"; Battle 162: "Magic Battle!!" (魔術戦！！, Majutsu Sen!!) / "Magician Battle!"; Battle 163: "Cross Trap!!" (十字の罠！！, Jūji no Wana!!) / "Crucifix Trap!"; Battle 164: "Revived Soul!!" (よみがえる魂！！, Yomigaeru Tamashī!!) / "The Calling Soul!"; Battle 165: "Stone of Memory" (石版の記憶, Sekiban no Kioku) / "Imprints of a Memory"; Battle 166: "Eyes that See the Future" (未来を見る眼, Mirai o Miru Me); Battle 167: "Obsessed!!" (とりつかれる！！, Toritsukareru!!) / "Smoothly!"; Battle 168: "Bug!! Bug!! Bug!!" (虫！！虫！！虫！！, Mushi!! Mushi!! Mushi!!) / "Bugs! Bugs! Bugs!"; Battle 169: "Encircling Net!!" (包囲網！！, Hōi Mō!!) / "Breaking the Net!"
20	The Approaching God!! / Slifer The Sky Dragon; Shirikuru Kami!! (迫りくる神！！)	September 4, 2000; 4-08-873008-9	February 7, 2006; 978-1-4215-0277-9
Battle 170: "Nearer to God!!" (迫りくる神！！, Semarikuru Kami!!) / "Nearer to God"; Battle 171: "Millenium Showdown!!" (千年の対決！！, Sennen no Taiketsu!!) / "Fight of the Millennium!"; Battle 172: "Summon the Nightmare" (悪夢召喚, Akumu Shōkan); Battle 173: "Combo of Despair!!" (絶望のコンボ！！, Zetsubō no Konbo!!); Battle 174: "God Combo!!" (神のコンボ！！, Kami no Konbo!!) / "God Combo!"; Battle 175: "Duelist Potential" (決闘者(デュエリスト)の可能性, Dyuerisuto no Kanōsei) / "A Duelist's Power"; Battle 176: "God is Being Deprived?!" (神堕つ！？, Kami Tatsu?!) / "God Falls!?"; Battle 177: "Attack That Opponent!!" (その敵を撃て！！, Sono Teki o Ute!!) / "Targets!"; Battle 178: "Each Other's Duel!!" (それぞれの決闘(デュエル)！！, Sorezore no Dyueru!!) / "Everybody Duel!!"
21	True Teamwork!! / Double Duel; Hontō no Kessoku!! (本当の結束！！)	November 2, 2000; 4-08-873035-6	April 4, 2006; 978-1-4215-0339-4
Battle 179: "Go All-out!!" (全力で行け！！, Zenryoku de Ike!!) / "Full Power!!"; Battle 180: "Fear of the New Sea!!" (海の恐怖再び！！, Umi no Kyōfu Futatabi!!) / "Return of the Sea Scourge"; Battle 181: "Sea Strategy!!" (海攻略！！, Umi Kōryaku!!) / "Sea Strategy"; Battle 182: "Betting on the Warrior!" (戦士に賭けよ！, Senshi ni Kakeyo!) / "A Warrior's Gamble!"; Battle 183: "Reason of the Duel" (決闘(デュエル)の理由, Dyueru no Riyū) / "The Reason for Dueling"; Battle 184: "Duel Field of Death!!" (死の決闘(デュエル)場！！, Shi no Dyueru-jō!!) / "Arena of Death!!"; Battle 185: "Revive God!!" (神よ よみがえれ！！, Kami yo Yomigaere!!) / "Awaken the Gods!!"; Battle 186: "Monsters of Teamwork!!" (結束の怪物(モンスター)！！, Kessoku no Monsutā!!) / "Monsters Unite!!"; Battle 187: "True Teamwork!!" (本当の結束！！, Hontō no Kessoku!!) / "Teamwork"
22	The Other One's Determination / Yugi vs. Jonouchi; Mō Ichi-ri no Ketsui (もう1人の決意)	December 22, 2000; 4-08-873060-7	June 6, 2006; 978-1-4215-0408-7
Battle 188: "Power Combined!!" (力 結合！！, Chikara Ketsugō!!) / "Combine Your Power!"; Battle 189: "Strongest Summon!!" (最強召喚！！, Saikyō Shōkan!!) / "Ultimate Summon!!"; Battle 190: "Promised Place!!" (約束の場所！！, Yakusoku no Basho!!) / "Where Jonouchi Waits"; Battle 191: "The Place of Destiny" (運命の場所, Unmei no basho); Battle 192: "Undesired Confrontation!!" (望まざる対決！！, Nozomazaru Taiketsu!!) / "The Unwanted Duel!!"; Battle 193: "Bombardment to the Heart!!" (心への砲撃！！, Kokoro e no Hōgeki!!) / "Heart Attack!!"; Battle 194: "The Card of Pride" (誇り(プライド)のカード, Puraido no Kādo); Battle 195: "The Other One's Determination" (もう1人の決意, Mō Hitori no Ketsui) / "Yugi Fights Alone"; Battle 196: "The Important Item" (一片の重み, Ippen no Omomi) / "The Last Piece of the Puzzle"
23	Burning Friendship!! / The Battle City Finals; Yūjō ni Mukete Ute!! (友情に向けて撃て！！)	April 4, 2001; 4-08-873099-2	August 1, 2006; 978-1-4215-0690-6
Battle 197: "One Card of Life and Death!" (生死の一枚！, Seishi no hitohira!); Battle 198: "Burning Friendship!!" (友情に向けて撃て！！, Yūjō ni Mukete Ute!!) / "Friends till the End"; Battle 199: "Our Treasure" (ボク達の宝, Boku-tachi no Takara) / "The Treasure"; Battle 200: "The Courage to See" (見ることの勇気, Mirukoto no Yūki); Battle 201: "Showdown of the Fighters!!" (決戦の闘士達！！, Kessen no Tōshi-tachi!!) / "Warriors Assemble"; Battle 202: "Our Arena" (闘技場の者たち, Tōgi-ba no Mono-tachi) / "The Eight Finalists"; Battle 203: "The First Enemy!!" (1回目の敵！！, Ichi-Kai menokataki!!); Battle 204: "Hidden Person!!" (潜む者！！, Hisomu Mono!!) / "The Thing in the Dark"; Battle 205: "Soul of Hatred!!" (怨念の魂！！, Onnen no Tamashī!!) / "The Undying Grudge!"
24	1-Turn Deathmatch!! / One-Turn Kill; Ittān no Shitō!! (1ターンの死闘！！)	June 4, 2001; 4-08-873123-9	October 3, 2006; 978-1-4215-0691-3
Battle 206: "Unbreakable Spirit!!" (折れない闘志！！, Orenai Tōshi!!) / "Unbreakable Spirit!"; Battle 207: "1-Turn Deathmatch!!" (1ターンの死闘！！, Ittān no Shitō!!) / "One-Turn Kill"; Battle 208: "Are You Going To Attack?!" (撃てるのか！？, Uteru no ka!?); Battle 209: "For the Sake of Bonds!!" (絆のために！！, Kizuna no Tame ni!!); Battle 210: "The Shrine's Traps!!" (神殿の罠！！, Shinden no Wana!!); Battle 211: "Deadly Trap World!!" (死の罠世界(トラップワールド)！！, Shi no Torappu Wārudo!!); Battle 212: "The Person who Succeeds the Duel" (決闘を継ぐ者, Kettō o Tsugu Mono); Battle 213: "A Surprising Piece" (意外なる一枚, Igai Naru Hitohira); Battle 214: "The Clan's Revenge!!" (復讐の一族！！, Fukushū no Ichizoku!!)
25	The Unbreakable Duelist / The Power of Ra; Orenai Dyuerisuto (折れない決闘者(デュエリスト))	September 4, 2001; 4-08-873157-3	December 5, 2006; 978-1-4215-0692-0
Battle 215: "Witness of the Clan!!" (一族の証！！, Ichizoku no Akashi!!); Battle 216: "God's Judgement!!" (神の裁き！！, Kami no Sabaki!!); Battle 217: "Awakening Darkness!!" (闇の目覚め！！, Yami no Mezame!!); Battle 218: "Solo Duelist" (決闘者(デュエリスト)一人, Dyuerisuto Hitori); Battle 219: "Jet-Black Game!!" (漆黒のゲーム！！, Shikkoku no Gēmu!!); Battle 220: "The Unbreakable Duelist" (折れない決闘者(デュエリスト), Orenai Dyuerisuto); Battle 221: "God Descends!!" (神を降ろせ！！, Kami o Orose!!); Battle 222: "Awakening of God!!" (神の目覚め！！, Kami no Mezame!!); Battle 223: "The Depths of Darkness!!" (闇の深み！！, Yami no Fukami!!)
26	The One Chosen by "God" / Duel with the Future "Kami" ga Erabi Shisha (「神」が選びし者)	November 2, 2001; 4-08-873182-4	February 6, 2007; 978-1-4215-1112-2
Battle 224: "The Beginning of the "Future!"" (「未来」の始まり！！, "Mirai" no Hajimari!!) / "The Eve of Battle"; Battle 225: "Kaiba's Outbreak!!" (海馬開戦！！, Kaiba Kaisen!!); Battle 226: "The One Chosen by "God"" (「神」が選びし者, "Kami" ga Erabi Shisha); Battle 227: "The Twilight Cemetery" (昏き墓穴, Kuraki Boketsu); Battle 228: "The Giant's Destruction!?" (巨神壊滅！？, Kyoshin Kaimetsu!?); Battle 229: "Blue Memory!!" (蒼い記憶！！, Aoi Kioku!!); Battle 230: "Defeating the Future" (未来撃破, Mirai Gekiha); Battle 231: "Darkness of the Past" (過去の闇, Kako no Yami); Battle 232: "The Clan's Darkness!!" (一族の闇！！, Ichizoku no Yami!!)
27	Battle of the Sun!! / Evil Vs. Evil; Kessen no Hihanoboru!! (決戦の陽は昇る！！)	March 4, 2002; 4-08-873231-6	April 3, 2007; 978-1-4215-1113-9
Battle 233: "Darkness Conflict!!" (闇の闘争！！, Yami no Tōsō!!); Battle 234: "Darkness VS Darkness!!" (闇VS闇！！, Yami Tai Yami!!); Battle 235: "The Crumbling Darkness!!" (崩れゆく闇！！, Kuzure Yuku Yami!!); Battle 236: "Birth of the Dark God!!" (暗黒の神生誕！！, Ankoku no Kami Seitan!!); Battle 237: "Night Before the Deathmatch!!" (死闘前夜！！, Shitō Zenya!!); Battle 238: "Battle of the Sun!!" (決戦の陽は昇る！！, Kessen no Hihanoboru!!); Battle 239: "Cross Souls!!" (クロスする魂！！, Kurosu Suru Tamashī!!); Battle 240: "Beckoning Attack!! Pursuing Attack!!" (迫撃！！追撃！！, Hakugeki!! Tsuigeki!!); Battle 241: "Choose Your Opponent!!" (標的を見据えよ！！, Hyōteki o Misueyo!!)
28	A Light to the Future!! / Duel the Lightning! Mirai e no Hikari!! (未来への光！！)	May 1, 2002; 4-08-873257-X	June 5, 2007; 978-1-4215-1114-6
Battle 242: "True Duelists" (真の決闘者(デュエリスト), Shin no Dyuerisuto); Battle 243: "To the Final Stage!!" (最終ステージへ！！, Saishū Sutēji e!!); Battle 244: "Song of Hell" (地獄の詩, Jigoku no Uta); Battle 245: "Falling into the Deadly Darkness!? (死の闇に堕つ！？, Shi no Yami ni Datsu!?); Battle 246: "Burning Prison!!" (灼熱の檻！！, Shakunetsu no Ori!!); Battle 247: "A Bolt Out Of The Blue!!" (逆境を貫く稲妻！！, Gyakkyō o Tsuranuku Inazuma!!); Battle 248: "God's 3rd Ability!!" (神 第3の能力！！, Kami Dai San no Nōryoku!!); Battle 249: "Dance of the Phoenix!!" (不死鳥 舞う！！, Fushichō Mau!!); Battle 250: "A Light to the Future!!" (未来への光！！, Mirai e no Hikari!!)
29	Osiris VS Obelisk!! / Slifer vs. Obelisk! Oshirisu bāsasu Oberisuku!! (神(オシリス)VS神(オベリスク)！！)	August 2, 2002; 4-08-873297-9	August 7, 2007; 978-1-4215-1115-3
Battle 251: "The Sky-Splitting Battle Cry!!" (空を裂く鬨の声！！, Sora o Saku Toki no Koe!!); Battle 252: "The Duel Colosseum In The Sky!!" (天空決闘闘戯場(デュエルコロシアム)！！, Tenkū Dyueru Koroshiamu!!) / "Sky Duel Coliseum!"; Battle 253: "God in Hand!!" (神を手に！！, Kami o te ni!!); Battle 254: "The Secret to Calling God!!" (神を呼ぶ秘策！！, Kami o Yobu Hisaku!!); Battle 255: "Intercept!! Obelisk!!" (迎撃！！オベリスク！！, Geigeki!! Oberisuku!!); Battle 256: "Osiris vs Obelisk!!" (神(オシリス)VS神(オベリスク)！！, Oshirisu bāsasu Oberisuku!!) / "God VS God!!"; Battle 257: "Fated Memories!!" (宿命の記憶！！, Shukumei no Kioku!!); Battle 258: "The Servant That God Answers!!" (神を超えたしもべ！！, Kami o Koeta Shimo Be!!); Battle 259: "Glass Deck!!" (ガラスのデッキ！！, Garasu no Dekki!!)
The other Yugi faces Kaiba in the semi-finals.
30	The Immortal Ra!! / Ra the Immortal; Fushinaru Rā!! (不死なる神(ラー)！！)	October 4, 2002; 4-08-873330-4	October 2, 2007; 978-1-4215-1116-0
Battle 260: "Crimson Soul!!" (真紅き魂！！, Shinkuki Tamashī!!); Battle 261: "Past Hatred!!" (憎しみの先へ！！, Nikushimi no Saki e!!); Battle 262: "As Friends!!" (友として！！, Tomo to shite!!); Battle 263: "Beast of Defeat!!" (勝敗を分かつ魔物, Shōhai o Wakatsu Mamono) / "The Monster of Victory of Defeat"; Battle 264: "The Entrusted Card" (たくされる一枚(カード), Takusareru Kādo); Battle 265: "Peak of the Decisive Battle!!" (頂上決戦！！, Chōjō Kessen!!); Battle 266: "The Swift Trap!!" (速攻に潜む罠！！, Sokkō ni Hisomu Wana!!); Battle 267: "Clash!! Osiris VS Ra!!" (激突！！天空竜(オシリス)VS太陽神(ラー)！！, Gekitotsu!! Oshirisu bāsasu Rā!!) / "Slifer vs. Ra!"; Battle 268: "The Immortal Ra!!" (不死なる神(ラー)！！, Fushinaru Rā!!) / "Ra the Immortal"
Yugi defeats Kaiba and Kaiba sets the island to explode in two hours.
31	Everyone Depart!! / Yugi vs. Marik; Sorezore no Tabidachi!! (それぞれの旅立ち！！)	December 4, 2002; 4-08-873347-9	December 4, 2007; 978-1-4215-1117-7
Battle 269: "Card of Fate!!" (運命の一枚(カード)！！, Sadame no Kādo!!) / "The Card of Fate"; Battle 270: "Devil's Sanctuary!!" (悪魔の聖域(デビルズ・サンクチュアリ)！！, Debiruzu Sankuchuari!!) / "Devil's Sanctuary"; Battle 271: "The Immortal Wall!!" (不死なる壁！！, Fushi Naru Kabe!!) / "Immortal Wall!"; Battle 272: "Ineffective Attacks!?" (攻略不能！？, Kōryaku Funō!?) / "Unbeatable?"; Battle 273: "God's Sword, God's Shield!!" (神の剣、神の盾！！, Kami no Ken, Kami no Tate) / "God's Sword, God's Shield"; Battle 274: "Surprise Attack from the Darkness!!" (闇からの奇襲！！, Yami Kara no Kishū!!); Battle 275: "1 Point of Life!!" (1ポイントの命！！, Ichi Pointo no Inochi!!); Battle 276: "Light into the Darkness!!" (生なる闇に光を！！, Namanaru Yami ni Hikari wo!!); Battle 277: "Alcatraz Explodes!!" (人工島(アルカトラズ)爆破！！, Arukatorazu Bakuha!!); Battle 278: "Everyone Depart!!" (それぞれの旅立ち！！, Sorezore no Tabidachi!!)
32	Millenium Treasure!! / The World Of Memory; Sennen no Hihō!! (千年の秘宝！！)	March 4, 2003; 4-08-873390-8	August 2, 2005; 978-1-59116-878-2
Battle 279: "Millenium Treasure!!" (千年の秘宝！！, Sennen no Hihō!!); Battle 280: "The Uneasy Night!" (胸騒ぎの夜！, Munasawagi no Yoru!); Battle 281: "The Truth of the Artifacts!!" (超古代遺物(アークティファクト)の真実！！, Ātifakuto no Shinjitsu!!); Battle 282: "Memory Journey!!" (記憶への旅へ！！, Kioku e no Tabi e!!); Battle 283: "The 6 Chosen Priests" (選ばれし6神官, Erabareshi Roku Shinkan); Battle 284: "Evil Shadow" (邪悪なる影, Jākunaru Kage); Battle 285: "Thief King Bakura!!" (盗賊王バクラ！！, Tōzoku-Ō Bakura!!); Battle 286: "Diabound VS Galestgoras!!" (精霊獣(ディアバウンド)VS魔物(ガレストゴラス)！！, Diabaundo bāsasu Garesutogorasu!!); Battle 287: "Father's Shadow" (父の影, Chichi no Kage)
After conquering Battle City, Dark Yugi has obtained all three God Cards and now requires all seven Millennium Items to unlock his lost memories. Dark Bakura once again feigns allegiance with Yugi and relinquishes the Millennium Eye which he took from Pegasus before his death, promising the Millennium Ring later. A mysterious man named Bobasa offers to act as a guide for Dark Yugi under orders from their old enemy Shadi, promising him Shadi's Millennium Key and Scales. When Dark Yugi and his friends arrive at the museum to present the God Cards in front of the Memory Tablet, Dark Yugi seems to disappear into the Memory World, where Yugi and his other friends (except Ryo Bakura, who is excluded because Bobasa had sensed an evil presence in his heart) decide to enter the Millennium Puzzle to find the true room to the Memory World using the Millennium Key, guided by Bobasa, in order to find the other Yugi. However, Dark Yugi was actually transported to the back of the Domino City Museum to play against Dark Bakura in the Shadow RPG, a tabletop role-playing reenactment of history powered by the Millennium Puzzle's memories, with his player character being his past self, the young Pharaoh aided by his six priests. In order to stop Dark Bakura from resurrecting the evil god Zorc and save the souls of his friends who are trapped in the game world, he must defeat Dark Bakura in the RPG. At the same time, Yugi and his friends must search for Dark Yugi's true name as NPCs in the Ancient Egyptian game world that resembles the past, ravaged by the vengeful Thief King.
33	Ancient Diaha!! / Magician's Genesis; Inishie no Diaha!! (古の決闘(ディアハ)！！)	May 1, 2003; 4-08-873419-X	December 6, 2005; 978-1-4215-0151-2
Battle 288: "In the Name of God" (神の名のもとに, Kami no Na no Moto ni); Battle 289: "Supreme Blow!!" (至高の鉄槌！！, Shikō no Tettsui!!); Battle 290: "Find the Name of the Pharaoh!!" (王(ファラオ)の名を探し！！, Farao no Na o Sagashi!!); Battle 291: "Ancient Diaha!!" (古の決闘(ディアハ)！！, Inishie no Diaha!!); Battle 292: "Battle Against the Magician!!" (魔術師の闘い！！, Majutsushi no Tatakai!!); Battle 293: "The Black Secret!!" (黒き奥義！！, Kuroki Ōgi!!); Battle 294: "Open the Invisible Door" (見えない扉を開けよ！！, Mienai Tobira o Akeyo!!); Battle 295: "Tears Flowing Through the Nile" (ナイルに流る涙, Nairu ni Nagareru Namida); Battle 296: "Ka Hunt!!" (魔物(カー)狩り！！, Ka-gari!!)
34	Ruler of Darkness!! / The Return of Bakura; Yami no Shihaisha!! (闇の支配者！！)	August 4, 2003; 4-08-873492-0	April 4, 2006; 978-1-4215-0409-4
Battle 297: "Bakura Returns!!" (盗賊王(バクラ)生還！！, Bakura Seikan!!); Battle 298: "Nighttime Shrine Attack!!" (神殿夜襲！！, Shinden Yashū!!); Battle 299: "Intercept the Royal Palace!!" (迎撃の王宮！！, Geigeki no Ōkyū!!); Battle 300: "Osiris VS Diabound" (天空竜(オシリス)VS精霊獣(ディアバウンド), Oshirisu bāsasu Diabaundo); Battle 301: "Heavenly Thunder VS Heavenly Darkness!!" (天の雷VS天の闇！！, Ten no Ikazuchi bāsasu Ten no Yami!!); Battle 302: "Ambush!! Assault!!!" (奇襲！！強襲！！, Kishū!! Kyōshū!!); Battle 303: "Power to Cut Through Darkness!!" (闇を切り裂く力！！, Yami o Kirisaku Chikara!!); Battle 304: "Ra Descends!!" (太陽神(ラー)降臨！！, Rā Kōrin!!); Battle 305: "Ruler of Darkness!!" (闇の支配者！！, Yami no Shihaisha!!)
35	Village of the Dead!! / Birth of the Dragon; Shiryō no Mura!! (死霊の村！！)	November 4, 2003; 4-08-873522-6	August 1, 2006; 1-4215-0693-9
Battle 306: "Back in Time!!" (戻された時間！！, Modosa reta Jikan!!); Battle 307: "Visiting Darkness!!" (訪れた闇！！, Otozureta Yami!!); Battle 308: "Creation of the Millenium Items!!" (千年宝物(アイテム)の誕生！！, Sennen Aitemu no Tanjō!!); Battle 309: "Ripples of Darkness" (闇の波紋, Yami no Hamon); Battle 310: "Awakening of the White Dragon!!" (白き龍の目覚め！！, Shiroki Ryū no Mezame!!); Battle 311: "Vessel of the White Dragon" (白き龍の器, Shiroki Ryū no Utsuwa); Battle 312: "Finding the Pharaoh!!" (ファラオ発見！！, Farao Hakken!!); Battle 313: "Village of the Dead!!" (死霊の村！！, Shiryō no Mura!!); Battle 314: "VS the Spirit Beast!!" (VS精霊超獣ッ！！, Bāsasu Seirei Chōjū'!!)
36	The Evil God Descends!! / Tomb of Shadows; Daijashin Kōrin!! (大邪神降臨！！)	February 4, 2004; 4-08-873560-9	January 2, 2007; 978-1-4215-0694-4
Battle 315: "Dark Camouflage!!" (闇の迷彩！！, Yami no Meisai!!); Battle 316: "Aura Shield!!" (怨念(オーラ)の盾！！, Ōra no Tate!!); Battle 317: "The Priests VS Diabound!!" (神官団VS精霊超獣(ディアバウンド)！！, Shinkandan bāsasu Diabaundo!!); Battle 318: "Penetrating Teamwork!!" (結束よ貫け！！, Kessoku yo Tsuranuke!!); Battle 319: "The Memory World "Piece"!!" (記憶世界の「駒」！！, Kioku Sekai no "Koma"!!); Battle 320: "The Ultimate!! Dark RPG!!" (究極！！闇(ダーク)・R(ロール)・P(プレイング)・G(ゲーム)！！, Kyūkyoku!! Dāku Rōru Pureingu Gēmu!!); Battle 321: "The Evil God Descends!!" (大邪神降臨！！, Daijashin Kōrin!!); Battle 322: "Phantom NPC!!" (幻のNPC(ノンプレイヤーキャラクター)！！, Maboroshi no Non Pureiyā Kyarakutā!!); Battle 323: "Exploring the King's Tomb!!" (王墓探究！！, Ō Bo Tankyū!!)
37	The Name of the King!! / The Name of the Pharaoh; Ō no Na no Moto ni!! (王の名のもとに！！)	April 30, 2004; 4-08-873592-7	October 2, 2007; 978-1-4215-1328-7
Battle 324: "Holy Tomb Duel!!" (聖墓の決闘！！, Hijiri Haka no Kettō!!); Battle 325: "The Silent Duelist!!" (沈黙の決闘者(デュエリスト)！！, Chinmoku no Dyuerisuto!!); Battle 326: "The Gathering Ghosts!!" (場(フィールド)に満ちる死霊！！, Fīrudo ni Michiru Shiryō!!); Battle 327: "I Won't Give Up!!" (ボクはあきらめない！！, Boku wa Akiramenai!!); Battle 328: "End of the World!!" (世界崩壊！！, Sekai Hōkai!!); Battle 329: "Until our Ba Runs Out!!" (魂(バー)尽きるまで！！, Bā Tsukiru Made!!); Battle 330: "Legendary Guardian!!" (伝説の守護神！！, Densetsu no Shugoshin!!); Battle 331: "The Soul's Shining Light!!" (魂の灯す光！！, Tamashī no Tomosu Hikari!!); Battle 332: "Slate of this World!!" (現世の石版！！, Gense no Sekiban!!); Battle 333: "The Name of the King!!" (王の名のもとに！！, Ō no Na no Moto ni!!)
38	Game King / Through The Last Door; Yūgi Ō (遊戯 王)	June 4, 2004; 4-08-873626-5	February 5, 2008; 978-1-4215-1515-1
Battle 334: "People who have Survived!!" (生き残りし者！！, Ikinokori Shisha!!); Battle 335: "White Dragon!! The Black Magician!!" (白き龍！！黒き魔術師！！, Shiroki Ryū!! Kuroki Majutsu-shi!!); Battle 336: "The One who Inherits the Light" (光を継ぐ者, Hikari o Tsugu Mono); Battle 337: "Beyond the Nile!!" (ナイルを越えて！！, Nairu o Koete!!); Battle 338: "Ceremonial Battle!!" (闘いの儀！！, Tatakai no Gi!!); Battle 339: "Yugi VS Atem!!" (遊戯VS王(アテム)！！, Yūgi bāsasu Atemu!!); Battle 340: "Strong Feelings!!" (強い気持ち！！, Tsuyoi Kimochi!!); Battle 341: "VS The Strongest Companion!!" (VS最強の仲間！！, Bāsasu Saikyō no Nakama!!); Battle 342: "Final Bet!!" (最後の賭け！！, Saigo no Kake!!); Battle 343: "Game King" (遊戯 王, Yūgi Ō) / The Journey of the King
