= Dota: Dragon's Blood =

2021 animated television series

- Book 1 promotional poster, featuring the lead character Davion.
- Based on: Dota 2 by Valve
- Developed by: Ashley Edward Miller
- Screenplay by: Ashley Edward Miller; Steven Melching; Ashley Halloran; Mitch Iverson; Amy Chu
- Story by: Ashley Edward Miller; Bryan Konietzko (season 1)
- Directed by: Park So Young; Kim Eui Jeong (season 1); Han Seung Woo (season 2–3); Han Cheong Il (season 2); Kim Sun Min (season 3); Mio Del Rosario (season 3)
- Voices of: Yuri Lowenthal; Lara Pulver; Tony Todd; Troy Baker
- Composer: Dino Meneghin
- Countries of origin: South Korea; United States
- Original language: English
- No. of seasons: 3
- No. of episodes: 24

Production
- Executive producers: Ashley Edward Miller; Ryu Ki Hyun (Note: Credited as "Co-Executive Producer" in season 1.)
- Animator: Production Reve (season 1)
- Editor: Kim Jun Hee
- Running time: 26–28 minutes
- Production companies: Studio Mir; Kaiju Boulevard

Original release
- Network: Netflix
- Release: March 25, 2021 – August 11, 2022

Dota: Dragon's Blood (Korean: 도타: 용의 피; RR: Dota: yongui pi) is a 2021 adult animated epic fantasy television series. It is based on the 2013 video game Dota 2 by Valve. The show was produced by Studio Mir in association with Ashley Edward Miller's company Kaiju Boulevard. The series premiered on Netflix on March 25, 2021, and concluded after three seasons on August 11, 2022.

== Plot ==
Set in a fantasy world of magic and mysticism, the story follows a Dragon Knight, Davion, who hunts and slays dragons to make the world a safer place. In a battle between demons and the dragon race of Eldwurm, the dragon Slyrak merges his soul with Davion. Along with the moon princess Mirana, Davion pursues a journey to stop the demon Terrorblade, who wants to kill all dragons and collect their souls.

== Voice cast and characters ==
- Yuri Lowenthal as Davion, the Dragon Knight who hates dragons for massacring his family as a child. After witnessing Terrorblade's evil, he allies with the Eldwurms, aiding Mirana and Marci on their quest, which the former became his love interest in Book 1.
- Lara Pulver as Princess Mirana, the exiled princess of the Nightsilver Woods, and Davion's love interest. She goes on a quest with Marci, her mute bodyguard, handmaid, and best friend, to recover the stolen lotuses of her patron goddess Selemene, in the end of Book 3, it is implied that she is pregnant with Davion's child, though it is unknown whether the child will have inherited any of the powerful abilities Davion had when he had merged with Slyrak's fiery essence.
  - Lara also voices Empress Sherzi, Mirana's mother.
- Tony Todd as Slyrak, one of the eight Great Dragons of Creation and Destruction. Slyrak is a proud and destructive Eldwurm, using Davion as a host to stay alive and battle Terrorblade.
- Troy Baker as the Invoker/the Sage. A powerful elfin sorcerer who is pivotal to Mirana's quest, he hates Selemene for her role in the death of his son. He makes a deal with Terrorblade for his deeply beloved daughter's revival. He operates as a hidden antagonist, manipulating everyone to kill his former goddess lover, Selemene, and six of the remaining eldwurms (dragon elders), for Selemene having poisoned their daughter Filomena.
  - Troy also voices Nico Hieronimo, a pangolin-like being who meets and accompanies Luna while she is in prison.
- Freya Tingley as Fymryn, a white-haired elf young woman who steals lotuses from the Nightsilver Woods because of a prophecy about Selemene, of whom she is ultimately revealed to be her reincarnation, having her godly abilities of long-range teleportation, and making ghostly duplicates of herself and make it as if she was never there.
- Josh Keaton as Bram, Davion's squire, now serving Kaden in "curing" Davion of Slyrak's possession.
- Kari Wahlgren as Luna. Once known as Scourge of the Plains, she commits war crimes upon the Elves who refuse to worship Selemene.
- Alix Wilton Regan as Selemene. Goddess of the Dark Moon, she declares war on them following Mene. Egotistical and sacrificial of her subjects with extreme prejudice on all who do not worship her, even her own ailing daughter.
  - Alix would later voice an older Filomena, born out of a remade universe in the Invoker's image, who was originally poisoned by her mother as a child. An intelligent, quick-witted scholar in her father's shadow, she uncovers the truth of her universe's creation, and seeks to prevent the impending cataclysm that the falling Ancients pose.
- Stephanie Jacobsen as Drysi, leader of the Elven Resistance against the Dark Moon Order's colonization and conversion of her people under Selemene's zealots.
- Anson Mount as Kaden. The only Dragon Knight to survive fighting an Eldwurm, he hunts for Slyrak who killed 29 of his friends in a battle two decades ago. He had an infant son and wife whom he left for the war.
- Matthew Waterson as Captain Frühling, the blond-haired alcoholic inhabitant of Barrow Haven that commandeered the local soldiers against an Eldwurm. Waterson also voices Gwanwyn. A elf merchant that betrayed Mirana with deals in rare information over selling artifacts.
- JB Blanc as Terrorblade. The main antagonist of the series, a gargoyle-like demon who wanders through the universe aiming to kill all the dragons in order to archive his goals.
- Doug Bradley as Viceroy Kashurra, the Eldwurm of the Void element who has contact with an ancient void that granted him sentience and the ability to disguise himself as a priest for many decades to have "the Eye" awaken and accept her destiny as the mortal reincarnation of the almighty Sun Goddess.
- Julie Nathanson as Rylai, a woman that found her innate elemental affinity to ice. She creates trouble for all those around her.
- Victoria Atkin as Lina, Rylai's older sister with ambition to match. Called "the Slayer", she was known as a child of fire like Slyrak himself. She was ultimately murdered by the recently revealed Eldwurm of the Void for hiring an assassin to end Princess Mirana's life and thus assume the crown.

== Episodes ==
=== Series overview ===
| Book | Episodes | Originally released |
|---|---|---|
| 1 | 8 | March 25, 2021 |
| 2 | 8 | January 18, 2022 |
| 3 | 8 | August 11, 2022 |

=== Book One (2021) ===
| No. overall | No. in season | Title | Directed by | Screenplay by | Original release date |
|---|---|---|---|---|---|
| 1 | 1 | "What the Thunder Said" | Park So Young | Ashley Edward Miller | March 25, 2021 |
Dragon Knight Davion from the Dragon's Hold and his squire Bram are enlisted by the village of Barrowhaven, to help slay a lone earth wyrmling. After defeating the wyrmling, Davion and Captain Fruhling, the leader of the local soldiers, discover an underground dragon nest where an Eldwyrm is slumbering deep within the tunnel system. Knowing the danger of confronting an Eldwyrm, Davion chooses to let it sleep, and returns to the village, much to Captain Fruhling's disapproval. While celebrating in the tavern, Davion encounters Mirana and her handmaiden Marci, who are there to meet with a hooded elven man named Gwanwyn, for information regarding their lost Lotuses. A skirmish with a drunkard and his thugs leads to Gwanwyn getting exposed as an elf. As elves are hated amongst the humans, Davion is forced to toss him out to save him from being attacked by them. Gwanwyn then instructs Mirana to seek for Nikdo in Haupstadt. Meanwhile, Terrorblade, a demon imprisoned among the fractured walls of Foulfell, possesses the body of Fruhling and puppeteers him to return to the Eldewyrm. After learning that Fruhling has returned to confront the Eldewyrm, Davion instructs Bram to alert the Dragon's Hold, while he races to rescue Fruhling. Davion arrives as Terrorblade kills Uldorak, the Eldwyrm whom Davion chose not to confront, and claims its soul. Terrorblade, still inside Fruhling's body, tells Davion to let him possess his body, before they are interrupted by Slyrak, the fire Eldwyrm who has arrived to demand Terrorblade release Uldorak's soul so he can rejoin the Thunder and be reborn. Terrorblade possesses Uldorak's body and wages battle against Slyrak, but the fight ends in a stalemate, as Terrorblade flees with Uldorak's soul. The dying Slyrak then kills Davion in a blood-based ritual. Later, Mirana finds a naked Davion alive but passed out in the forest and decides to help him at her aide Marci's insistence.
| 2 | 2 | "Princess of Nothing" | Kim Eui Jeong | Steven Melching | March 25, 2021 |
While Davion is still disoriented in the battle's aftermath, he is ambushed and robbed by bandits on the road, but awakens the next day with Mirana and Marci. Unable to remember details of the night before, he identifies Mirana as the Nightsilver Woods' Princess, a sore subject for her. Arriving in Hauptstadt and rooming at a small inn, Davion regurgitates a ring that is identified by a bandit as belonging to his slain compatriot who had robbed Davion two nights earlier. When the bandit swears vengeance, Davion tries to buy weapons, but nobody will sell to him given the bandit's threat. When Mirana and Marci reach the Black Market, their Elf contact reveals he betrayed them and they are captured. Escaping later, the duo coerce the Elf into naming their next lead, a Shopkeeper who gives Mirana a gem and directs them to the Invoker, a sorcerer who lives in the Broken Peaks. As the bandits attack Davion, he transforms into a humanoid Slyrak called 'Slyvion', and kills them all, but regains his human form upon finding his Dragon Blade. Though traumatized by his transformation, Mirana still helps him escape before city guards arrest him, and they set out to seek the Sage for answers. Elsewhere, Elf girl Fymryn reveals that she was the one who stole the Lotuses.
| 3 | 3 | "Neverwhere Land" | Park So Young | Ashley Halloran | March 25, 2021 |
In a flashback, it is revealed that Fymryn stole the lotuses from the pools of Selemene's temple in Nightsilver Wood. She uses her disguise ability, teleportation and duplication ability to escape the pursuit from Mirana and Marci, who serves the Dark Moon Goddess Selemene. Blaming herself for failing to stop the thief, Mirana and Marci take it upon themselves to leave Nightsilver Wood to retrieve the lotuses from the thief. Fymryn brings the lotuses back to the Coedwei forest enclave, one of the enclaves occupied by the Coriel'Tauvi, an elf race who worships the goddess Mene after being outcast by Selemene from Nightsilver Wood for refusing to worship her. Fymryn and the Coriel'Tauvi believes that their goddess Mene has been trapped in the shadow by Selemene, and Fymryn intends to fulfill a prophecy of bringing Mene back so that they can overthrow Selemene and return to living in Nightsilver Wood. To do so, she embarks on a journey with fellow Coedwigs inhabitants Adara, Dyfed and Idwal to the Broken's Peak to find the Invoker, believing based on the story that he could use the Lotus to bring back Mene. Upon reaching the tower, the Invoker is shocked that she can locate his hidden tower. He takes the Lotus from her, gives her a coin with a face of Mene, and sends them back out to the woods instead of helping them. Having failed the mission, the team decided to spend a night in the forest. Luna, worshipper of Selemene, arrives and demands them to return the Lotus, while murdering all of them except Fymryn, who was saved by the Invoker. Troubled by his hidden dragon form, Davion joins Mirana and Marci's journey to the Broken Peaks, hoping that the sage Invoker could also provide some answers to his problem. En route, Mirana is separated from the group on a snowy mountain and encounters cannibalistic zombie creatures controlled by a glowing red, evil power. Davion, Marci and Sagan manage to save Mirana in time.
| 4 | 4 | "The Monster at the End of This Book" | Kim Eui Jeong | Mitch Iverson | March 25, 2021 |
Mirana and Davion reach a Dragon Knight fortress in the mountains, and they are soon joined by legendary Dragon Knight, Kaden. Kaden reveals to them that he is on a revenge quest against Slyrak, after Slyrak murdered 29 of his fellow Dragon Knights almost 20 years ago in the city of Leathsham. Since the incident, Kaden started slaughtering dragons and forged armor from their corpses to prepare himself for the fight against Slyrak. The revelation leaves Davion in a conflicted position. Despite keeping quiet, Kaden quickly deduces that Slyrak is hiding inside Davion, as he injured Davion to draw Slyrak out. The ensuring battle between Slyrak and Kaden destroys the fortress, while Slyrak carries Marci, Mirana and Sagan to escape. As an attempt to pacify Fymryn who was enraged by the Invoker's refusal to help return Mene and not saving her pods from Luna, the Invoker gives her a book, and tells her to read it so that she could understand his reason. He later appears as an illusion in front of Selemene, and reveals to Selemene that the Elven Legion, a secret army of Coriel'Tauvi will soon be emerging to take her down while she is weakened due to the loss of the Lotus. Enraged, Selemene decides to take the first strike by tasking Luna to lead the Dark Moon Order, a trained warrior legions of Selemene, to the Coriel'Tauvi and force them to worship her.
| 5 | 5 | "The Fire Sermon" | Park So Young | Steven Melching | March 25, 2021 |
Following Davion's fight with Kaden, Slyrak goes on a rampage while Davion's consciousness is trapped in communion with the other Elder Dragons on the Thunder Plane. Davion encounters the other eldwurms (Aethrak, Lirrak, Byssrak, Indrak, Orrak and Vahdrak) and they exchange information, while a disoriented Slyrak attacks Marci, Sagan and Mirana. Davion and the Eldwurms deduce that a demon called Terrorblade is hunting them, and that Slyrak has permanently bonded himself to Davion. Sensing Slyrak is going to kill Mirana and the eldwurms not wanting Davion in the Thunder, they kill Davion to bring Slyrak back to the Thunder and Davion back to the real world. Later on, Davion and the team managed to locate the Mage's Tower by looking through the Shopkeeper's Gem. (Possibly referencing the Gem of True Sight of the Dota video games.)
| 6 | 6 | "Knight, Death and the Devil" | Kim Eui Jeong | Ashley Halloran & Mitch Iverson | March 25, 2021 |
Luna serves as Selemene's weapon in the battle to subdue the rebel enclaves of the Nightsilver Woods and force the inhabitants to declare their loyalty to the Dark Moon. Selemene bestows her power to Luna and the Dark Moon Order, allowing them to capture Drysi, the Elven Legion leader while killing everyone else in the Elven Legion effortlessly. Mirana and Davion reach the Invoker's tower and seek his help. The Invoker reveals to Davion that the eight souls of the eldwyrms that the Terrorblade is collecting, serve as the eight pillars of creation that support all of the realms and the infinite realities, and that Terrorblade intends to use the souls to remake the world in his image. In order to help Slyrak soul who is hiding inside Davion, the Invoker imbues a spell to prevent Davion from turning into Slyrak or Slyrion, but the process will kill Davion eventually. The Invoker also rejects Mirana's opinion of Selemene, but nevertheless agrees to return the Lotus to her on the condition that she order her troops to withdraw from Coriel Tauvi's enclaves. Fymryn, having read the book and learnt the fate of the Invoker's daughter, was tasked unwillingly by the Invoker to accompany Davion, Marci, Sagan and Mirana to return the lotuses, while instructing Fymryn secretly to return Davion to him after the deed is done.
| 7 | 7 | "Speak the Words" | Park So Young | Amy Chu | March 25, 2021 |
The Invoker seeks out Lirrak, and proceeds to steal her soul. While recuperating, he thinks back to the memories of his daughter Filomena. It was revealed that Selemene and the Invoker were once a couple, but separated after Filomena and the Invoker chose not to worship her. Their relationship strained further when Selemene refused to cure an ill Filomena, whom she had poisoned to lure the Invoker back to her, after Filomena insisted to refuse worshipping her, letting her daughter die. Mirana, Marci, Davion and Fymryn travel together to return the stolen lotuses, while their conflicting agendas cause tension. While quarreling, Mirana, Marci and Davion learn that Fymryn is a worshipper of Mene and the thief of the Lotuses. Despite the quarrel, the team agree to put aside their differences and continue the mission.
| 8 | 8 | "A Game of Chess" | Kim Eui Jeong | Ashley Edward Miller | March 25, 2021 |
Kaden, having survived the ordeal against Slyrak, continues his pursuit of Davion with Bram and fellow dragon knights. While entering the Coedwei forest, Davion's team discovered and buried the Legion's corpses who were killed by Luna's Dark Moon Order, before venturing to the village within the forest. Reaching the village with the shrine, now occupied by Luna's Dark Moon Order and the surviving but imprisoned Coedwei elves, Fymryn left the group while Mirana handed the lotuses to Luna. Having accomplished the mission, Mirana prepares to return to her noble position while Davion contemplates parting ways. Fymryn attempts to rescue Drysi, who rejects her help because she now chooses to stop hiding and that Selemene's attacks has given them back their taste for blood. Luna attempts to return the Lotuses to Selemene, but unexpectedly triggered a trap by the Invoker, causing the moon to be covered by shadow. As a result, Selemene's power bestowed on Luna and the Orders were taken away, while the captured Coedwig and Drysi rebelled and attack Luna, the Orders, Mirana, Marci and Sagan. In the midst of the chaos, Davion transformed into Slyvian to help Marci, Sagan, Mirana and an injured Luna escape, but he was captured by the arriving Kaden, Bram and the Dragon Knights. At the same time, the Invoker used one of the Lotuses to summon Terrorblade into the Nightsilver Wood, who proceeded to wage battle with Selemene, after the Invoker strikes a bargain with Terrorblade: Terrorblade will help defeat Selemene, while the Invoker helps him collect the dragons' souls. Due to the loss of power and in a weakened state, Terrorblade defeats Selemene, draining her of her divinity, before the Invoker offers her sanctuary.

=== Book Two (2022) ===
| No. overall | No. in season | Title | Directed by | Screenplay by | Original release date |
|---|---|---|---|---|---|
| 9 | 1 | "Nothing with Nothing" | Park So Young | Ashley Edward Miller | January 18, 2022 |
Stripped of her divinity, Selemene warns the Invoker that he is making a mistake for making a deal with the demon. Invoker rejected her plea to return her power. Meanwhile, Mirana and Marci accompanied Luna and the surviving Orders members, who are starting to lose faith in Selemene for failing to assist them after returning the Lotuses. Kaden and the team brought Davion back to see the Father, leader of the Dragon Knights, at the Dragon's Hold. While resting, Ritterfau, veteran Dragon Knight, bickered with Kaden over bringing a Dragon Knight back as Slyrak. Meanwhile, Father started experimenting on Davion. Fymryn tries to rescue Davion, who rejected her help after learning that she had previously secretly agreed to bring him back to the Invoker after returning the Lotuses. Later on, Fymryn discovered Father's experimental plan of transfusing his blood to let himself transform into a human/dragon hybrid and gain the power of a dragon. After a failed experiment, the dying Father allowed Terrorblade to possess his body. Having learnt of Father's secret, Fymryn tried again to demand Davion to escape, while dragon swarms, summoned by Terrorblade with Uldorak's soul, approach Dragon Hold.
| 10 | 2 | "My Sword, My Life" | Han Cheong Il | Steven Melching | January 18, 2022 |
Despite best efforts from Ritterfau and the Dragon Knights, the swarm successfully massacred the knights and destroyed the fortress, while Bram inherited Ritterfau's sword. In order to stop Terrorblade from manipulating Bram, Kaden and Davion and Fymryn to let him possess their body, Fymryn killed Father, body vessel to Terrorblade. Rylai and Auroth arrived to save Bram, Davion, Kaden and Fymryn from the swarm and brought them back to her home. While Mirana, Marci, Luna and the weary troops take refuge in a village situated in Uplands, a friendly territory, they were drugged and captured by Vanari, an assassin hired to kidnap Mirana and bring her to the Helio Imperium, capital to an empire under the ruling of Mirana's royal family.
| 11 | 3 | "The Lady of Situations" | Han Seung Woo | Ashley Halloran | January 18, 2022 |
Wanting to fulfill its purpose of creation by bringing chaos, Vahdrak betrayed and killed fellow Eldwyrm kins Orrak, Indrak, Byssrak, Aethrak, allowing the Invoker to collect their souls, including Vahdrak's. Davion's group take shelter at Auroth's cavern, and discovered a mysterious ore in Auroth's possession, which transformed Auroth many years ago by giving her the ability to converse with humans and turn into human form, but removed her ability to communicate with other Eldwyrms. Davion used the ore to talk to Slyrak, who instructed him to seek the Eye of Worldwyrm at the Helio Imperium, so Slyrak can travel to Foulfell to kill Terrorblade. Arriving at the Helio Imperium, Mirana reunited with Asar (an Ursa warrior serving in the castle), Viceroy Kashurra (advisor to Emperor) and Emperor Shabarra (Mirana's uncle who killed Mirana's father, Emperor Zal for the throne), while Luna befriend Nico Hieronimo in prison. Emperor Shabarra proposed a marriage with Mirana to unite the splintered empire to prepare for the rising tension with the Coriel'Tauvi.
| 12 | 4 | "Desolate and Empty the Sea" | Park So Young | Mitch Iverson | January 18, 2022 |
Fymryn leaves the group to try and convince her people from starting a war, while Kaden departs to rebuild Dragon's Hold. Rylai instructs Davion to find her sister, Lina at the Helio Imperium so she can help Davion meet the emperor. Davion heads to the Helio Imperium with Bram and Auroth, who takes human form before entering the capital. Mirana attempts to bargain for an army to reclaim Nightsilver Wood as a marriage term, but was rejected by war council member Legatus Tihomir, who funds the troops. The Invoker relinquishes Lirrak's soul to Terrorblade but refuses to hand over the rest of the dragon souls, citing his refusal to aid Terrorblade's plan. Terroblade leaves after issuing a threat. Luna escapes from prison with her new ally Nico and stumbles upon Davion's group before meeting with Mirana, but in the end Mirana is struck in her heart by a magic arrow shot by Vanari, a bounty hunter. Luna and Nico immediately follow the assassin.
| 13 | 5 | "The Burial of the Dead" | Han Seung Woo | Ashley Halloran & Mitch Iverson | January 18, 2022 |
After learning more about Filomena, a remorseful Selemena, apologizes to the Invoker, who is troubled with Terrorblade's threat. Auroth, Davion and Lina deduce that Mirana is neither dead or alive. Davion meets with Emperor Shabarra to seek the Eye, but is rejected. Davion transforms into Slyvion and kills Shabarra. Luna and Nico track Varani down and discovers the person who hired her: Lina. Lina knocks out Luna and flees the scene, while Marci arrives to help Luna. In a series of flashbacks, a child Mirana befriends Marci who was rendered a mute by bullies. Kashurra punished the bullies and promoted Marci to Mirana's handmaiden. Later on, rebels appeared in the city, causing Mirana's parents to die, while Asar assisted Mirana and Marci to escape to the Nightsilver Wood.
| 14 | 6 | "The Hyacinth Girl" | Park So Young | Amy Chu | January 18, 2022 |
Marci, Sagan and the surviving Dark Moon Order soldiers, having escaped Vanari's kidnapping wagon thanks to Sagan, regroup with Luna. Lina confronts Slyvion, who feels a connection with Lina, declaring that Lina is a child of fire and therefore a part of him. Luna turns him back to Davion to stop his rampage against the Praetorian Guard. Davion pledges support to Lina to become a regent. Following Shabarra's death, the morning sun shines onto Mirana, bringing her back to life. Mirana returns to the Senate, surprising everyone including Davion, to declare her desire to take over the ruling from Emperor Shabarra. Her appeal attempt failed when the Senate chooses to elect Lina as the regent, with support from Tihomir. Upset at Davion's support to Lina's regent bid and for killing Emperor Shabarra, Mirana blames Davion and leaves him to return to her bedroom with Azar. At night, Marci, Luna, Nico and the Black Moon Order visit and reunite with Mirana, before revealing to her that Lina is the one who hired the assassin.
| 15 | 7 | "The Violet Hour" | Han Seung Woo | Steven Melching | January 18, 2022 |
Learning the truth, Mirana tasks Luna and the Orders to return to the Nightsilver Wood and wait for her, while she returns to the castle with Asar, Bram, and Auroth. With the help of Lina, Davion finally accesses the Eye but, when nothing happens, he believes it's a forgery. Fymryn is tempted by Terrorblade, while the Invoker reveals to her she is the reincarnation of Mene and asks her to take the divine spark of Selemene, who's now powerless and held prisoner in his tower, to stop the Coriel'Tauvi, who has been driven mad by revenge. Lina confesses to a desolate Davion that she hired the assassin who tried to kill Mirana, thinking that doing so would expose Shabarra as a fraud and that the Senate would make him abdicate. Feeling betrayed, Davion reconciles with Mirana. Fymryn confronts Selemene and, instead of killing her, she brings her to visit Filomena's tomb: Selemene then regains her powers and flees the tower. Davion and Mirana interrogate old Captain Asar about the night the Emperor was killed and they suspect that Kashurra has swapped the real Eye with the forgery. Meanwhile, Viceroy Kashurra kills Lina for trying to kill Mirana. Davion, Mirana, Bram and Auroth go in search of the real Eye but they are stopped by Viceroy Kashurra who is revealed to be a Void Dragon.
| 16 | 8 | "Unreal City" | Park So Young | Ashley Edward Miller | January 18, 2022 |
Having fled from the Invoker's castle, Selemene reaches Luna and the Dark Moon Order but they now reject her in favor of Mirana, leading Selemene to take her power back from them as she attacks Coriel'Tauvi. Viceroy Kashurra, now fully transformed into a Void Dragon, kills Auroth as she stall Kashurra and allows Mirana to escape. Meanwhile, in a dream, Slyrak reveals to Davion that The Eye that he is seeking, is inside Mirana herself and that she would need to awaken it in the throne room. Davion and Slyrak join forces against Kashurra while Bram teleports Kaden to the battlefield with the portal scroll. Tihomir, who attempts to prevent Mirana from accessing the throne room, is killed by Asar. Kashurra reveals to Mirana that he is a dragon who has been transformed by the strange ore (just like Auroth), and has been drawn to Mirana due to her being the Eye of the Worldwyrm. He kills Marci and Mirana finally opens the Eye and kills Kashurra. Slyrak sets Davion free and Mirana is proclaimed Empress. Fymryn returns to Selemena's castle, now returned under the rule of Selemena after she decimated the Coriel'Tauvi.

=== Book Three (2022) ===
| No. overall | No. in season | Title | Directed by | Screenplay by | Original release date |
|---|---|---|---|---|---|
| 17 | 1 | "The Wind Under the Door" | Han Seung Woo & Mio Del Rosario | Ashley Edward Miller | August 11, 2022 |
With the Eye opened, Slyrak traverses to Foulfell to confront Terrorblade and his army, as well as the souls of Uldorak and Lirrak, but he is killed as Terrorblade collect Slyrak's fiery spirit. Drysi, now hunted by the strengthened troops of Selemene's, allows Terrorblade to enter her body. With Selemene's power taken away, Luna and the Dark Moon Legion gather the scattered troops around the enclaves and return with Nico to Mirana to join her Praetorian Guard. They are joined by Davion and Bram, who uncover that the dragons are converging to Broken's Peak, a sign that Slyrak has failed to kill Terrorblade and that Terrorblade is launching an assault on the Invoker. The Invoker, having successfully but barely repelled Terrorblade's dragon swarm assault and killing Drysi, forges an uneasy alliance with Mirana to attack Terrorblade while transferring his dragons' souls to Davion. Upset at Selemene's refusal to change for the better, Fymryn saps the Dark Moon Goddess of her innermost divine spark and takes her infinite strength into herself; therefore fully embracing her destiny as the reincarnation of Mene, the Light Moon Goddess herself, and as such evolves to deific status and strength. As she fades away from all of the planes of existence, Selemene gives Fymryn a warning: The powers shall drive her mad as they had done so once before, which is what ultimately led to her own destruction and rebirth as Fymrym.
| 18 | 2 | "Hell of Hells" | Park So Young & Kim Sun Min | Steven Melching | August 11, 2022 |
As Mirana's group prepares, Kaden instructs Bram to stay and appoints him Father to rebuild Dragon's Hold. Entering Foulfell with the Invoker, Mirana, Davion, Luna and Kaden experienced traumatic flashbacks under the influence of Terrorblade. The Invoker conjures an invocation to summon Fymryn, now with the almighty strength of a goddess, who saves Empress Mirana's group from their flashbacks and joins the fight. The group mounts an all-out assault on Terrorblade and his army, while Davion sacrifices himself to kill the demon. While Empress Mirana and her allies mourn over the passing of Davion, the Invoker gathers all of the eight dragons' spirits and forges an entirely new world, where Selemene, a teenage Filomena and Marci are very much alive.
| 19 | 3 | "This Stranger's Life" | Han Seung Woo & Mio Del Rosario | Mitch Iverson | August 11, 2022 |
Having her memory of the old world altered, Empress Mirana now rules Helio Imperium in the new world, with Marci, Lina, Emperor Zal, Shabarra and Tihomir resurrected and living in the new world. Informed of the appearance of a large red stone that has surfaced at Hinterlands and has turned the villagers there into monsters, Empress Mirana and her army burn down the village while bringing the stone back. Emperor Zal, who is suffering from dementia due to the loss of his wife, instructs Mirana to bring the stone to find the Oracle. The Oracle reveals to her that it is a Direstone, which restores her memory of the old world. He explains that the Invoker has used the pillars of creation to collapse all realities into one. Deducing that since it is the pillars of creation which created the new world, Mirana plans to use it to restore the old one. Empress Mirana tells Lina and Luna to return to their father. The alternate teenage Filomena warns the Althing council about the threats from the stones that has started appearing, and seeks to speak with the goddess, but the Invoker retracts her request and destroys her research into the Stones. Arriving at Barrowhaven's bar, Mirana and Marci find Davion, with altered memories, and enlist his help to take down Slyrak.
| 20 | 4 | "The Hanged Man" | Park So Young & Kim Sun Min | Ashley Halloran | August 11, 2022 |
While traveling to Slyrak's cavern, Davion, Empress Mirana and Marci encountered Hellbear, a creature under the influence of the Stones, and a tree under the control of the Direstone. After destroying both, and unconvinced by Mirana's explanation, Davion leaves Empress Mirana and the alternate version of the mute Marci. Goddess Mene, starts feeling disoriented and confused when residual memory of the old world surfaced. Filomena visits Mene but experiences the phantom residual memories projected from Mene, before Mene casts her out. Hoping for answers from her father, the Invoker, Filomena uses his pool to locate him on the moon conversing with Zet, The Arc Warden, who is struggling to unify the Radiant and Dire. The Invoker tries, but fails to take Arc Warden's energy to contain the Ancients, before he is rescued by Filomena. Empress Mirana finds Kaden inside Slyrak's cavern, who is preparing to slay the sleeping Eldwyrm. Empress Mirana attacks Kaden to stop him.
| 21 | 5 | "Summons of the Ideal" | Han Seung Woo & Kim Sun Min | Chiara Farina & Zach Ragatz | August 11, 2022 |
The Invoker falls into a healing sleep while Filomena revisits Mene, sensing that Mene's residual memories might provide answers. Filomena accesses Mene's mind and visits fragment memories of the old world as Fymryn. Piecing together the pieces and learning the existence of the two moons among many things, Mene gets her memories of her past life back and wakes the Invoker up, telling him to reveal the truth to Filomena. Davion, worried over Mirana, heads to Slyrak's cavern. The battle between Kaden, Mirana and the awakened Slyrak concludes with Kaden fatally injuring Slayrak before Mirana fatally injures him. Kaden reveals to Davion that he remembers Davion and passes Davion his sword before he dies, while a dying Slyrak tells Mirana that there is nothing they can do to restore the old world. Later on, Luna informs Mirana and Marci that a war has erupted.
| 22 | 6 | "Twelve Thousand Four Hundred and Three" | Park So Young & Kim Sun Min | Ashley Halloran & Mitch Iverson | August 11, 2022 |
Filomena discovered from the Archronicus that the second moon in the old world was what protected Earth from the Direstones and ores of the shattered Mad Moon. The Invoker confesses to Filomena that this is his twelve thousand-four hundred-and-third attempt to reshape the universe, and that without the second moon in the new world, the entire Earth except the Invoker's tower will eventually be destroyed. Shabarra and Tihomir, now elected as regent and Viceroy, respectively, by the Senate, dispatch Lina and the army to repel attacks from the Coriel'Tauvi. After accepting a parley from general Drysi, commander of Principality, Lina assists the returning Mirana with Marci and Luna to take the throne back by force, while Emperor Zal dies from illness. In Haupstadt, Direstone monsters attack and kill Davion. As he dies, the ember soul, hidden by Slyrak in his body, awakens and turn him into Hybrion, a new human/Slyrak hybrid form. Reverting to human form, human memory restored and warning from Slyrak over the end of the world from the shattering Mad Moon, Davion and Bram set out to find Empress Mirana.
| 23 | 7 | "Lunartropism" | Han Seung Woo & Kim Sun Min | Steven Melching | August 11, 2022 |
Following Emperor Zal's death, Empress Mirana opens "the Eye" of the Sun Goddess deep within her fully and ascends to goddess-like status and infinity powerful solar-based cosmic abilities. Filomena, with the help of her father, attempt to perform "the Forge", a procedure to remake the universe. The use of the dragons' souls during the procedure established a telepathic connection between Filomena and Davion. Filomena suggests using the dragons' souls to bolster Arc Warden's power to buy time, but is rebuffed by the Invoker, stating that it will drain her life and awaken the Eldwyrms to wreck the Earth instead. Davion and Bram reunite with Mirana and he warns her over the threat of the Mad Moon. Davion, Mirana and their allies seek the Invoker's help but encounter Filomena, who proposes to cooperate to perform The Forge that will repair the moon, but are too late when the Invoker kills the Arc Warden with the power of the stolen Lotus. The Mad Moon shatters, raining Direstones and Radiant Ores to destroy Earth. Lina sacrifices herself to stop the raining ores while the Invoker leaves Empress Mirana in cold space.
| 24 | 8 | "Consider Phlebas" | Park So Young & Kim Sun Min | Ashley Edward Miller | August 11, 2022 |
Fymryn, having recently fully bonded with Mene's dormant essence within her, whisks Empress Mirana from space, and tells her that she remembers the old world. The Invoker attempts to stop Filomena from conjuring The Forge, but is interrupted by Davion, who turns into Hybrion. The Invoker and Hybrion's confrontation concludes when Empress Mirana, Mene and Filomena appear and teleport Hybrion back to the Invoker's valley. Filomena confesses to her beloved father that she is inflicted with the exact same illness that had killed her as a girl in the old world, and they reconcile. Filomena tells Empress Mirana that her divine spark, The Eye, would allow her to restore the old world. After bidding farewell to her allies, the Invoker and Filomena conjure The Forge with the dragon souls, returning Mirana to Foulfell of the old world, at the moment the Invoker attempts to rebuild the new world. With the Invoker's plan failed, Mirana and her allies leave the Invoker in Foulfell and return to Earth. As they mourn the death of Davion who died fighting Terrorblade, Fymryn (now Mene) and Mirana agree to work together to restore the world. Mirana finds the Archronicus in the Invoker's Tower, and pass it to the shopkeeper for safekeeping, who accepts it as a "divine favor" from the human embodiment of the almighty Sun Goddess herself. In the old world, the fully healed teenage Filomena restores her home to its original splendor, while her markings of the fatal, unspecified illness that ultimately took her young life and own divine spark originally disappear entirely, and she hears the voice of her divine mother Selemene.

== Production ==
The series was announced by Netflix on 17 February 2021. It is a joint collaboration between South Korean studio Mir and American company Kaiju Boulevard. Production Reve, another South Korean studio, provided the animation services for Book One while Studio Mir took over for Books Two and Three. The animation style is a blend of anime and Western animation.

== Release ==
Dota: Dragon's Blood debuted on March 25, 2021, on Netflix. A teaser trailer was released on February 19, followed by a full trailer on March 1. A promotional video, titled "Basshunter Dota Revival", was released on YouTube alongside the show's debut. In it, Swedish musician Basshunter is singing "Vi sitter i Ventrilo och spelar DotA" while playing Dota 2, with scenes from Dragon's Blood shown in between. During The International 2021 immediately following a trailer for season two, a video with 2D animation from Studio Mir was shown revealing original character Marci was being added to Dota 2 as a playable hero. Marci was added to the game as a part of gameplay update 7.30e on October 28.

A second season was announced on April 19, 2021. Originally set for release on January 6, 2022, Book Two premiered on January 18. A third season premiered on August 11, 2022.

== Reception ==
For the first season, the review aggregator website Rotten Tomatoes reports a 75% approval rating, based on 12 reviews, with an average rating of 7.60/10. The website's critics consensus reads: "While knowledge of the game isn't necessary, it might have been nice if Dota: Dragon's Blood had translated more of its narrative prowess to the small screen."
