= Morris Minor and the Majors =

British band

- Genres: Comedy
- Years active: 1987
- Label: Ten Record Ltd.
- Past members: Tony Hawks; Paul Boross; Phil Judge

Morris Minor and the Majors were a British band formed by the comedians and writers Tony Hawks and Paul Boross. The group became famous with their 1987 song "Stutter Rap", an original song in the style of the then-popular rap song "No Sleep till Brooklyn" by the Beastie Boys.

The stage names of the group were 'Morris Minor', 'Rusty Wing' and 'Phil Errup' (real names Tony Hawks and Rotherham stars Paul Boross and Phil Judge).

The song reached No. 4 in the UK Singles Chart, No. 14 in Canada and was a No. 2 hit in Australia. It sold over 220,000 copies, but subsequent song releases never had the same popularity or sales, earning them the title one-hit wonders in the United Kingdom; a title which would later inspire Hawks to seek another top 20 hit, albeit in Albania.

On the 45 release, the record had a joke B-side titled "Another Boring B-side", the lyrics of which parody the actual creation of the song.

In Australia, they had a second charting single with "This Is the Chorus" (No. 22), which parodied Stock/Aitken/Waterman.

As a result of the popularity of the song, a television series was created in 1989, titled Morris Minor's Marvellous Motors and written by and starring Hawks. On the series, the fictional band-leader attempted to maintain his pop music career while running an automotive garage. It ran for just one series and aired on BBC1.

== Discography ==
=== Singles ===
List of singles, with selected chart positions
Title	Year	Peak chart positions	
Title	Year	UK	AUS
"Stutter Rap"	1987	4	2
"This Is the Chorus"	1988	95	22
"Morris Minor"	1989	—	—
