= Round Ireland with a Fridge =

Book by Tony Hawks

- Author: Tony Hawks
- Language: English
- Genre: Memoir
- Publication date: 1998
- Publication place: United Kingdom

Round Ireland with a Fridge is a book by Tony Hawks, first published in the UK in 1998. It sold over half a million copies.

The book is loosely based on a journey made by Hawks in 1997, when he hitchhiked around Ireland while re-evaluating his life and career. He made the trip as a result of a £100 bet with a friend, after he had seen a man in Ireland hitchhiking with a refrigerator.

Publishers Weekly called the book "a bad parody of Dave Barry's travel books" but added: "In the end, Hawks's book becomes a lively celebration of contemporary Irish society and the goodwill of its people that neither revels in irony nor descends into mawkishness."

== Film version ==
A film based on the book was directed by Ed Bye and starred Tony Hawks as himself, Valerie O'Connor as Roisin Mulvaney, Ed Byrne as Dylan Daley, Sean Hughes as Brendan, Josie Lawrence as Sandra, Andy Taylor as Kevin and Sara Crowe as Nicole. The film premiered at the Cambridge Film Festival on 22 September 2010, to mixed reviews, and then released on DVD.
