= Bar bet =

Wager, often trivial, made between people in a social setting such as a bar

A bar bet is a bet made between two patrons at a bar. Bar bets can range from wagers about little-known trivia, such as obscure historical facts, to feats of skill and strength. Some bar bets are intended to trick the other party into losing.

== Famous bar bets ==
- The annual Midnight Sun baseball game played in Fairbanks, Alaska (the only game to be contested after midnight without the use of artificial lighting) was established in 1906 as the result of a bar bet.
- Two of Tony Hawks' books, Round Ireland With A Fridge (ISBN 0-09-186777-0) and Playing The Moldovans At Tennis (ISBN 0-09-187456-4), were written describing Hawks' attempts to win two bar bets.
- The film To Have and Have Not is supposedly the result of bar bet between Ernest Hemingway and Howard Hawks, with Hemingway betting Hawks that Hawks couldn't make a good film from Hemingway's worst novel.
- A common rumor claims that the creation of Scientology was the result of a bar bet between L. Ron Hubbard and Robert A. Heinlein. Richard Leiby, a reporter for The Washington Post covering the group, never found any evidence to substantiate it.
- A class of Feynman diagram became known as a Penguin diagram due to a bar bet between physicists John Ellis and Melissa Franklin.

== Enforceability ==
In a jurisdiction, bar bets may or may not legally binding. Especially if gambling is illegal in the winning party's jurisdiction, it may be difficult to have a court enforce the bet. A written contract, drawn up soberly the next day and signed by both parties, can avoid doubt.

For example, if one or both parties are intoxicated when the bet is made, they may be found to lack capacity to agree to a contract, and the contract would thus be found void or voidable.

However, the fact that the agreement is oral but not written does not undermine it: oral contracts are valid, though certain contracts must be written, under the statute of frauds, such as for the transfer of land.
