= Bring It All Back =

1999 single by S Club 7

Single by S Club 7

from the album S Club
- B-side: "So Right"; "Hello Friend"
- Released: 7 June 1999
- Studio: Steelworks (Sheffield, England)
- Genre: Pop; Bubblegum
- Length: 3:33
- Label: Polydor; 19
- Songwriters: Eliot Kennedy; Mike Percy; Tim Lever; S Club 7
- Producers: Eliot Kennedy; Mike Percy; Tim Lever

S Club 7 singles chronology
"Bring It All Back" (1999)	"S Club Party" (1999)

Audio sample
- file; help

Music video
- "Bring It All Back" on YouTube

"Bring It All Back" is the debut single of British pop group S Club 7. It was co-written by S Club 7, Eliot Kennedy, Mike Percy and Tim Lever for the group's debut studio album S Club (1999). Kennedy, Percy, and Lever also produced the song. It was released on 7 June 1999 as the album's lead single. "Bring It All Back" was used as the theme for the band's first CBBC series Miami 7 as well.

"Bring It All Back" was a chart success, reaching the top spot in the United Kingdom and New Zealand whilst also peaking within the top ten in Ireland and Sweden. The song was released in North America on 28 September 1999, shortly before their television show Miami 7 became popular in the United States. By February 2023 it had sold 1,036,000 copies in the UK.

== Song information ==
"Bring It All Back" is notable for being the only S Club 7 single on which all four female members share lead vocals. The first verse is shared by Jo O'Meara and Rachel Stevens, while the second verse is split between Tina Barrett and Hannah Spearritt. Bradley McIntosh, Jon Lee and Paul Cattermole provide backing vocals and additional vocals on the final chorus. The single contains an extended version of the track with an additional refrain and chorus, as well as a club remix by K-Klass, which appears on all international versions of the single.

The single also contains two B-sides, "So Right" and "Hello Friend". "So Right" features in the sixth episode of Miami 7, and as a bonus track on the Japanese version of the band's debut album, and is an up-tempo R&B number. "Hello Friend", a ballad duet between O'Meara and Lee with additional backing vocals, was one of only three songs from the band's debut album era not performed during Miami 7, alongside "Our Time Has Come" and "Friday Night". However, it was later performed during Viva S Club to mark Cattermole's departure from the band. It was later added to the setlist of the Bring It All Back 2015 tour as an intimate duet between O'Meara and Lee.

== Critical reception ==
Music Week selected the single as "Recommended" ahead of its release, saying "It's a tough week on the release front, but this could be the debut of the year so far ... manager Simon Fuller and Polydor boss Lucian Grainge have turned to a trio of proven songwriters - among them Spice Girls contributor Eliot Kennedy - to produce this fun-filled, uptempo pop outing." Daily Record commented, "The latest catchy lite pop offering from the latest band whose pigeon hole is marked manufactured. More catchy than sticky willies." In 2017, ShortList's Dave Fawbert listed 'Bring It All Back' as containing "one of the greatest key changes in music history".

== Music video ==
Two music videos exist for the track. The first, recorded for use in the British and Australian markets, features newly recorded scenes of the band performing the track on a beach stage in Miami, recorded during the filming of Miami 7, as well as additional montage clips from several episodes of the series. The end of the video shows a group of people watching the band as the cameras pull away. Most notably, there are two beach stage scenes in the video that show Barrett with a different hairstyle compared to the rest of the video. This version of the video was shown for the first time on the British music chart show Top of the Pops on 30 April 1999, with S Club 7 introducing it following a short interview with Jamie Theakston.

The second video was recorded for use in the United States, and features scenes of the band performing the song in an American trailer park (recorded during the filming of the band's TV special Boyfriends and Birthdays), as well as in a courtroom, scenes taken from episode 10 of Miami 7, "Court in the Act". The video also features clips of the band performing the song poolside, which are taken from the opening credits of the series.

== Track listings ==
- UK CD1
1. "Bring It All Back"
2. "So Right"
3. "Bring It All Back" (extended mix)
4. "Bring It All Back" (CD ROM video)
- UK CD2 (includes two band postcards)
1. "Bring It All Back"
2. "Hello Friend"
3. "Bring It All Back" (K-Klass club mix)
- UK cassette single
1. "Bring It All Back"
2. "So Right"
- US CD single
1. "Bring It All Back"
2. "Bring It All Back" (K-Klass club mix)
3. "S Club 7 in Miami" (CD-ROM trailer)
- Australian CD single (includes bonus poster and star file)
1. "Bring It All Back"
2. "So Right"
3. "Bring It All Back" (K-Klass club mix)
4. "Bring It All Back" (CD ROM video)
- Digital single
1. "Bring It All Back" – 3:34
2. "So Right" – 3:44
3. "Hello Friend" – 3:02
4. "Bring It All Back" (extended mix) – 5:32
5. "Bring It All Back" (K-Klass club mix) – 6:14
6. "Bring It All Back" (karaoke version) – 3:36

== Credits and personnel ==
Credits are taken from the S Club album booklet.

Studios

- Recorded at Steelworks Studios (Sheffield, England)
- Mastered at Transfermation (London, England)

Personnel

- Eliot Kennedy – writing, production
- Mike Percy – writing, production
- Tim Lever – writing, production
- S Club 7 – writing
- Andy Wright – additional production
- Mark "Spike" Stent – mixing
- Jan Kybert – mixing assistant
- Noel Summerville – mastering
- Richard Dowling – mastering

== Charts ==
=== Weekly charts ===
Chart (1999–2000)	Peak position
Australia (ARIA)	3
Austria (Ö3 Austria Top 40)	13
Belgium (Ultratip Bubbling Under Flanders)	2
Belgium (Ultratop 50 Wallonia)	5
Canada Adult Contemporary (RPM)	64
Denmark (IFPI)	2
Europe (Eurochart Hot 100)	7
France (SNEP)	21
Germany (GfK)	6
Ireland (IRMA)	3
Netherlands (Dutch Top 40)	4
Netherlands (Single Top 100)	3
New Zealand (Recorded Music NZ)	1
Scottish Singles Sales (Official Charts)	1
Spain (Promusicae)	4
Sweden (Sverigetopplistan)	9
Switzerland (Schweizer Hitparade)	2
UK Singles (Official Charts)	1
UK Airplay (Music Week)	20

=== Year-end charts ===
Chart (1999)	Position
Australia (ARIA)	14
New Zealand (RIANZ)	4
Romania (Romanian Top 100)	100
UK Singles (OCC)	11

Chart (2000)	Position
Australia (ARIA)	56
Belgium (Ultratop 50 Wallonia)	32
Europe (Eurochart Hot 100)	56
Germany (Media Control)	70
Netherlands (Dutch Top 40)	26
Netherlands (Single Top 100)	19
Sweden (Hitlistan)	60
Switzerland (Schweizer Hitparade)	32

=== Decade-end charts ===
Chart (2000–2009)	Position
Netherlands (Single Top 100)	100

== Certifications ==
Region	Certification	Certified units/sales
Australia (ARIA)	Platinum	70,000^{^}
Belgium (BRMA)	Gold	25,000^{*}
Netherlands (NVPI)	Gold	50,000^{^}
New Zealand (RMNZ)	Platinum	30,000^{‡}
Sweden (GLF)	Gold	15,000^{^}
United Kingdom (BPI)	2× Platinum	1,200,000^{‡}
^{*} Sales figures based on certification alone.^{^} Shipments figures based on certification alone.^{‡} Sales+streaming figures based on certification alone.

== Cover versions ==
The song was covered by Taiwanese pop singer Jolin Tsai and re-titled "Don't Stop" for the 2000 album Don't Stop. Korean girl group GFriend also covered the song at various music festivals. On 21 May 2021, Lucy Spraggan released her cover.
