= Reach (S Club 7 song) =

2000 single by S Club 7

Single by S Club 7

from the album 7
- B-side: "I'll Be There"; "Someday, Someway"
- Released: 22 May 2000
- Length: 4:02
- Label: Polydor; 19
- Songwriters: Cathy Dennis; Andrew Todd
- Producers: Cathy Dennis; Toddy

S Club 7 singles chronology
"Two in a Million" / "You're My Number One" (1999)	"Reach" (2000)	"Natural" (2000)

Audio sample
- A 30-second sample of "Reach".: file; help

Music video
- "Reach" on YouTube

"Reach" is a song by English pop group S Club 7. Released as the lead single from their second studio album, 7 (2000), on 22 May 2000, it is an up-tempo track co-written by Cathy Dennis and Republica keyboardist Andrew Todd.

"Reach" debuted at number two on the UK Singles Chart and spent three weeks at its peak, unable to dislodge Sonique's "It Feels So Good" from number one. The song has sold 1.2 million copies in the UK, allowing it to receive a double-platinum sales certification from the British Phonographic Industry (BPI). "Reach" was the theme tune to the second series of the group's CBBC series, L.A. 7.

== Single information ==
"Reach", the fourth single from S Club 7, discusses how, if one follows their dreams and "reach for the stars", they are destined to fulfill their goals. Like songs before it, "Reach" sees vocals shared around the group. Originally recorded for S Club 7's first album, it was performed by the group as a featured track on the Boyfriends & Birthdays television special which aired on 12 December 1999. This track instantly became popular and, after some minor adjustments, was chosen as the first single from the group's second album 7. The song was a popular track on the band's arena tours. The group often commented on how audience members of all ages would "go crazy" for the song.

The single was notable for not being released in neither Australia nor the United States, both of whom had received releases of the band's first three singles from their debut album. The reason for this was not given, so in both countries, "Natural" served as the lead single from 7. The single contains an additional remix by Eiffel 65, while a limited edition 3-inch CD available with cans of Pepsi contains a further remix by Steve Anderson. This version has Jo O'Meara and Bradley McIntosh dividing Jon Lee's verse between them, and O'Meara also takes Paul Cattermole's middle-eight section. The cassette format of "Reach" features an exclusive track, a karaoke version of "Reach". Also included on the single are two B-sides, "I'll Be There" and "Someday, Someway", and a remix of "S Club Party" by Cattermole and McIntosh. The Almighty remix of "Reach", featuring on the "Never Had a Dream Come True", contains an alternate vocal take with Lee singing O'Meara's first verse. "I'll Be There" was later included on 7, while "Someday, Someway" remained as a B-side. It was later performed during episode ten of L.A. 7, "Making Movies".

On the S Club United Tour, a clip from the "Reach" video of Cattermole singing was played during his part, due to his departure from the band the year before. The band later recorded a "United" version of the song with S Club 8 following Cattermole's departure from the band.

== Music video ==
The music video takes place in Littlerock, California. At the start of the video, many of the townspeople are going on with their everyday lives, until S Club arrive in a large pink bus. There are strong contrasting colours in this music video, with the dull appearance of the town and the people in it, contrasting with the bright colours of S Club's pink, blue and yellow bus.

In the video, S Club 7 distribute neon bubblegum, which enlivens the townsfolk when they chew them. Throughout the video, many groups of people – such as the local school kids and a brass band – come to see the group as their drive through their town. At the end of the video, S Club 7 exit the town in their pink bus, eventually lifting up off the ground and disappearing. It was revealed that the smoke that was emitted from the S Club bus when any candies were given caused the extras on set to cough and splutter, meaning many shots had to have more than one take.

== Track listings ==
- UK CD1 and Australian CD single
1. "Reach" – 4:05
2. "Reach" (Eiffel 65 edit) – 4:09
3. "I'll Be There" – 3:25
4. "Reach" (CD-ROM video)
- UK CD2 and European CD single
1. "Reach" – 4:05
2. "S Club Party" (Paul & Bradley's remix) – 3:49
3. "Someday, Someway" – 3:15
- UK cassette single
1. "Reach" – 4:05
2. "Reach" (karaoke version) – 4:05
- Digital single
1. "Reach" – 4:02
2. "I'll Be There" – 3:23
3. "Someday, Someway" – 3:15
4. "Reach" (radio edit) – 3:52
5. "Reach" (Eiffel 65 edit) – 5:42
6. "Reach" (Steve Anderson remix) – 9:21
7. "Reach" (Almighty remix) – 9:12
8. "Reach" (karaoke version) – 4:04

== Credits and personnel ==
Credits are lifted from the 7 album booklet.

Studio

- Mastered at Transfermation (London, England)

Personnel

- Cathy Dennis – writing, keyboards, production, additional vocal production
- Toddy – writing (as Andrew Todd), guitars, production
- Gus Isidore – guitars
- Dave Arch – piano, organ, keyboards, programming, arrangements
- Gary O'Toole – drums
- Geoff Holroyde – additional drums
- Andy Duncan – additional drums
- The Kick Horns – brass
- Thom Russo – additional vocal production
- Andy Wright – additional production and programming
- Stephen Lipson – additional production
- Heff Moraes – mixing
- Noel Summerville – mastering
- Richard Dowling – mastering

== Charts ==
=== Weekly charts ===
Chart (2000)	Peak position
Australia (ARIA)	38
Europe (Eurochart Hot 100)	7
Germany (GfK)	62
Ireland (IRMA)	8
New Zealand (Recorded Music NZ)	28
Scotland Singles (OCC)	2
Spain (PROMUSICAE)	20
Sweden (Sverigetopplistan)	42
Switzerland (Schweizer Hitparade)	30
UK Singles (OCC)	2
UK Airplay (Music Week)	27

Chart (2023)	Peak position
UK Singles Downloads (OCC)	62

=== Year-end charts ===
Chart (2000)	Position
Ireland (IRMA)	47
UK Singles (OCC)	11

=== Decade-end charts ===
Chart (2000–2009)	Position
UK Singles (OCC)	84

== Certifications ==
Region	Certification	Certified units/sales
New Zealand (RMNZ)	Gold	15,000^{‡}
United Kingdom (BPI)	2× Platinum	1,200,000^{‡}
^{‡} Sales+streaming figures based on certification alone.
