= S Club Party =

1999 single by S Club 7

Single by S Club 7

from the album S Club
- B-side: "Viva La Fiesta"; "Our Time Has Come"
- Released: 20 September 1999
- Studio: StarGate (Norway)
- Length: 3:30
- Label: Polydor; 19
- Songwriters: Mikkel Eriksen; Hallgeir Rustan; Tor Erik Hermansen; Hugh Atkins
- Producer: StarGate

S Club 7 singles chronology
"Bring It All Back" (1999)	"S Club Party" (1999)	"Two in a Million" / "You're My Number One" (1999)

Music video
- "S Club Party" on YouTube

"S Club Party" is a song by British pop group S Club 7. It was released on 20 September 1999 as the second single from their debut studio album, S Club (1999). The song was written by Mikkel Eriksen, Hallgeir Rustan, Tor Erik Hermansen, and Hugh Atkins and produced by StarGate.

"S Club Party" received a mixed reception from music critics. Despite this, it reached the top spot in New Zealand and peaked at number two in the United Kingdom and Australia. It was certified platinum in Australia and gold in New Zealand and the United Kingdom.

== Single information ==
"S Club Party", the band's second single, is a song that is described as an "introduction to the band". Each line of the song's second verse describes a different member of S Club 7: "Tina's doin' her dance, Jon's lookin' for romance, Paul's gettin' down on the floor, while Hannah's screamin' out for more. Wanna see Bradley swing? Wanna see Rachel do her thing? Then we got Jo, she's got the flow - get ready everybody 'cause here we go!" Following the departure of Paul Cattermole from S Club 7, they recorded a "United" version of the song with S Club 8, which omits the second verse and replaces it with the chant, "Ooh, ooh!" and extra ad lib vocals by S Club 8 vocalists Aaron Renfree, Frankie Sandford, Jay Asforis, Stacey McClean and Rochelle Humes. Following Cattermole's death and Hannah Spearrit's departure from S Club in 2023, the second verse was removed almost entirely and replaced with repeats of "Get ready everybody" for the Good Times Tour.

The single contains two B-sides, "Viva La Fiesta" and "Our Time Has Come". "Viva La Fiesta" later made the final track listing of the band's debut album, although "Our Time Has Come" remained as a B-side. "Our Time Has Come" was written at the same time as the band's debut single, "Bring It All Back", and was again produced by Eliot Kennedy. The track was a contender to be the band's debut single alongside "Bring It All Back", and was written as a contrast: while "Bring It All Back" features lead vocals from the girls, "Our Time Has Come" features lead vocals from the boys. Our Time Has Come was one of only three singles from the band's debut album era not to be performed on Miami 7, but it was performed live during the band's S Club Party - Live tour in 2001. Remixes of "S Club Party" by Dave Way and Jason Nevins were released on CD2, while the Australian CD single includes an extended version of "Bring It All Back".

== Music video ==
The music video for the track was filmed in the Californian desert on the set of the Back to the '50s special. The 50s gang challenge S Club 7 to a race, mirroring the famous race in Grease. The theme of the video is the United States in the 1950s. The group then sing "S Club Party" and they go on to win the race. Each member of the group also has their own "S" shot, where they draw an S in the sky whilst jumping in the air. When the group sing the song in the TV movie, Back to the '50s, it differs slightly from the music video. In the movie version, some scenes were cut out or shortened. In the music video, it shows some clips from the movie and all of S Club 7 have more single shots including Hannah, Jon and Tina. The music video version also has a different ending, with S Club 7 dancing in front of the camera having fun and dancing in the back of a truck with everyone from the movie dancing around them. A longer version of the video has the band being challenged to a race upon arrival. It ends with the leader of the gang complementing S Club 7's victory before the band drives away.

== Track listings ==
- UK CD1
1. "S Club Party"
2. "Viva La Fiesta"
3. "Our Time Has Come"
4. "S Club Party" (CD ROM video)
- UK CD2 (includes band poster)
1. "S Club Party"
2. "S Club Party" (Dave's Git Down Party mix)
3. "S Club Party" (Jason Nevins club mix)
- UK and Australasian cassette single
1. "S Club Party" – 3:30
2. "Viva La Fiesta" – 3:09
- Australasian CD single
1. "S Club Party"
2. "Viva La Fiesta"
3. "Our Time Has Come"
4. "Bring It All Back"
5. "S Club Party" (CD ROM video)
- Digital single
1. "S Club Party"
2. "Viva La Fiesta"
3. "Our Time Has Come"
4. "S Club Party" (Jason Nevins club mix)
5. "S Club Party" (Dave's Git Down Party mix)
6. "S Club Party" (Paul & Bradley's mix)
7. "S Club Party" (karaoke version)

== Credits and personnel ==
Credits are lifted from the S Club album booklet.

Studios

- Recorded at StarGate Studios (Norway)
- Mastered at Transfermation (London, England)

Personnel

- Mikkel Eriksen – writing
- Hallgeir Rustan – writing
- Tor Erik Hermansen – writing
- Hugh Atkins – writing
- Steve Hilton – keyboards, programming
- StarGate – production
- Jeremy Wheatley – additional production and mix
- Noel Summerville – mastering
- Richard Dowling – mastering

== Charts ==
=== Weekly charts ===
Chart (1999–2000)	Peak position
Australia (ARIA)	2
Belgium (Ultratop 50 Wallonia)	19
Europe (Eurochart Hot 100)	11
France (SNEP)	45
Germany (GfK)	78
Ireland (IRMA)	9
Netherlands (Dutch Top 40)	22
Netherlands (Single Top 100)	26
New Zealand (Recorded Music NZ)	1
Scotland Singles (OCC)	3
Spain (Top 40 Radio)	24
Switzerland (Schweizer Hitparade)	39
UK Singles (OCC)	2
UK Airplay (Music Week)	23

=== Year-end charts ===
Chart (1999)	Position
UK Singles (OCC)	60

Chart (2000)	Position
Australia (ARIA)	38

== Certifications and sales ==
Region	Certification	Certified units/sales
Australia (ARIA)	Platinum	70,000^{^}
New Zealand (RMNZ)	Gold	15,000^{‡}
United Kingdom (BPI)	Gold	528,000
^{^} Shipments figures based on certification alone.^{‡} Sales+streaming figures based on certification alone.
