= Two in a Million =

1999 single by S Club 7

Single by S Club 7

from the album S Club
- A-side: "You're My Number One"
- B-side: "We Can Work It Out"
- Released: 13 December 1999
- Studio: StarGate (Norway)
- Length: 3:34
- Label: Polydor; 19
- Songwriters: Cathy Dennis; Simon Ellis
- Producer: StarGate

S Club 7 singles chronology
"S Club Party" (1999)	"Two in a Million" / "You're My Number One" (1999)	"Reach" (2000)

Music video
- "Two in a Million" on YouTube

Audio video
- "Two in a Million" (Boyfriends & Birthdays version) on YouTube

"Two in a Million" is a song by British pop group S Club 7, released as the third single from their debut studio album, S Club (1999), on 13 December 1999. It was written by Cathy Dennis and Simon Ellis, who would go on to write the group's future hits "Don't Stop Movin'" and "Never Had a Dream Come True".

"Two in a Million" was released as a double A-side with "You're My Number One" in the UK, but in other countries, it was issued as a stand-alone single. The single debuted at number five on the UK Singles Chart and peaked at number two in January 2000. In New Zealand, "Two in a Million" became the band's third consecutive number-one single, after "Bring It All Back" and "S Club Party".

== Single information ==
"Two in a Million" is described as "a song about falling in love, having somebody to comfort you, and someone to be there for you no matter what." The song sees Jo O'Meara taking sole lead vocals for the first time. The album version of "Two in a Million" and the Boyfriends & Birthdays version (so named as it was the theme song of their BBC TV special) are almost exactly the same, except the Boyfriends & Birthdays version has slightly more robust instrumentation, taking on a more orchestral and R&B approach, and pauses the music during the last line of each verse right before the chorus. The latter is included on the North American version of S Club 7's second album, 7 (2000). Moreover, the demo version of the song, as heard on the CBBC series Miami 7, includes horns in the arrangement, which were removed for album release and replaced with a more subtle French horn arrangement alongside the live string orchestration in the Boyfriends & Birthdays version.

The single includes an exclusive B-side, "We Can Work It Out", which was performed during episode eight of Miami 7, "Alien Hunter", featuring Hannah Spearritt and Rachel Stevens on lead. The track was again co-written by Mike Rose and Nick Foster, who wrote "You're My Number One". The UK release of the single includes the Miami 7 version of "You're My Number One", while the Australian release replaces this with the Jason Nevins remix of "S Club Party". The US release opts for a completely different B-side, containing an exclusive club mix of "Two in a Million" by Mark Penchotti, which has never been released elsewhere.

== Music video ==
The music video was shot in Los Angeles, California and sees the group all together in a house getting ready for a party. The video has a "black and white" theme to it, in that, in the beginning, the group are dressed in white clothes except for Hannah who was dressed in black clothes and surrounded by white walls and furniture. They then sing together on a sofa. The group are seen to be getting ready for a party; the boys are shaving in the bathroom and the girls are trying on clothes in the bedroom. The group then move outside, where they continue performing beside a swimming pool. The colours change to black; they wear black clothes and there is dark lighting. People soon join them and the group sing and dance until the end of the video.

== Track listings ==
- UK CD1
1. "Two in a Million" (Boyfriends & Birthdays version)
2. "You're My Number One" (Miami 7 version)
3. "We Can Work It Out"
4. "Two in a Million" (CD-ROM video)
- UK CD2
1. "You're My Number One" (Miami 7 version)
2. "Two in a Million" (2000 version)
3. "Down at Club S"
4. "You're My Number One" (CD-ROM video)
- UK cassette single

A. "Two in a Million" (Boyfriends & Birthdays version)
B. "You're My Number One" (Miami 7 version)

- Australasian CD single
1. "Two in a Million" (Boyfriends & Birthdays version)
2. "Two in a Million" (2000 version)
3. "S Club Party" (Jason Nevins club mix)
4. "Two in a Million" (CD-ROM video)
- US CD single
1. "Two in a Million" (Boyfriends & Birthdays version) – 3:34
2. "Two in a Million" (Mark Picchiotti club mix) – 8:13
3. "S Club Party" (snippet) – 0:53
4. "You're My Number One" (snippet) – 0:42
- Digital EP
1. "Two in a Million" (Boyfriends & Birthdays version) – 3:34
2. "You're My Number One" (Miami 7 version) – 3:26
3. "We Can Work It Out" – 3:11
4. "Two in a Million" (2000 version) – 5:26
5. "Down at Club S" – 4:03
6. "Two in a Million" (Mark!'s vocal mix) – 8:13
7. "You're My Number One" (Almighty mix) – 10:45
8. "Two in a Million" (Jeremy Wheatley mix) – 3:38
9. "You're My Number One" (Jeremy Wheatley mix) – 3:36
10. "Two in a Million" (Mark Picchiotti radio mix) – 3:10

== Credits and personnel ==
Credits are lifted from the S Club album booklet.

Studios

- Recorded at StarGate Studios (Norway)
- Mastered at Transfermation (London, England)

Personnel

- Cathy Dennis – writing
- Simon Ellis – writing
- StarGate – production
- Noel Summerville – mastering
- Richard Dowling – mastering
- Jeremy Wheatley – additional production and mixing (Boyfriends & Birthdays version)

== Charts ==
=== Weekly charts ===
"Two in a Million" / "You're My Number One"

Chart (1999–2000)	Peak position
Europe (Eurochart Hot 100)	11
Ireland (IRMA)	8
Scotland Singles (OCC)	4
UK Singles (OCC)	2

"Two in a Million"

Chart (1999–2000)	Peak position
Australia (ARIA)	25
Netherlands (Dutch Top 40 Tipparade)	8
Netherlands (Single Top 100)	45
New Zealand (Recorded Music NZ)	1
Switzerland (Schweizer Hitparade)	95
UK Airplay (Music Week)	10

=== Year-end charts ===
Chart (1999)	Position
UK Singles (OCC)	83

Chart (2000)	Position
UK Singles (OCC)	167

== Certifications ==
Region	Certification	Certified units/sales
United Kingdom (BPI)	Silver	200,000^{^}
^{^} Shipments figures based on certification alone.
