= You're My Number One =

1999 single by S Club 7

Single by S Club 7

from the album S Club
- A-side: "Two in a Million"
- B-side: "Down at Club S"
- Released: 13 December 1999
- Length: 3:26
- Label: Polydor; 19
- Songwriter: Dufflebag Boys
- Producer: Absolute

S Club 7 singles chronology
"S Club Party" (1999)	"Two in a Million" / "You're My Number One" (1999)	"Reach" (2000)

Music video
- "You're My Number One" on YouTube

Audio video
- "You're My Number One" (Miami 7 version) on YouTube

"You're My Number One" is a song by British pop group S Club 7, released as the fourth and final single from the band's debut album, S Club (1999), on 13 December 1999. The single was released only in UK as a double A-side with "Two in a Million" and peaked at number two on the UK Singles Chart; in other countries, only "Two in a Million" was released. It was the first S Club 7 single to be released as a double A-side, later followed by "Say Goodbye" and "Love Ain't Gonna Wait for You" in 2003. "You're My Number One" is described as a fun up-tempo retro number.

== Single information ==
"You're My Number One" is an upbeat, retro-styled song about a person questioning what love is to them. They feel that if love is what they are feeling, then they have to tell the person they like that they're their "number one", in that nobody else is right for them. The Miami 7 version of the song is different from the album version, as it contains a heavier drum track, features multilayered vocals from Jo in the chorus and takes on a more modern style. The Miami 7 version of the song was not actually the version heard on Miami 7, as it and the album version contain a different intro and take on different approaches than the version heard on Miami 7.

The single contains an exclusive B-side, "Down at Club S", which was performed during episode three of Miami 7, "The Blue Chevy". It is very much in a similar style to "You're My Number One", and was co-written by Simon Franglen and Angela Lupino, who also wrote "Gonna Change the World" for the group. The single also includes an alternate version of "Two in a Million" known as the 2000 version.

== Music video ==
The music video for the song was shot in New York City. Throughout, S Club 7 are performing a dance routine in front of a white background. Halfway through the video, the group partake in a foam fight. Towards the end, the band are joined by many more dancers who perform the same hand jive-esque routine until the end of the music video. In an interview, Bradley McIntosh recalls that each member was brought a selection of outfits to choose from to wear in the video, but he was only brought one outfit to wear, which he hated.

== Track listings ==
- UK CD1
1. "Two in a Million" (Boyfriends & Birthdays version)
2. "You're My Number One" (Miami 7 version)
3. "We Can Work It Out"
4. "Two in a Million" (CD-ROM video)
- UK CD2
1. "You're My Number One" (Miami 7 version)
2. "Two in a Million" (2000 version)
3. "Down at Club S"
4. "You're My Number One" (CD-ROM video)
- UK cassette single

A. "Two in a Million" (Boyfriends & Birthdays version)
B. "You're My Number One" (Miami 7 version)

- Digital EP
1. "Two in a Million" (Boyfriends & Birthdays version) – 3:34
2. "You're My Number One" (Miami 7 version) – 3:26
3. "We Can Work It Out" – 3:11
4. "Two in a Million" (2000 version) – 5:26
5. "Down at Club S" – 4:03
6. "Two in a Million" (Mark!'s vocal mix) – 8:13
7. "You're My Number One" (Almighty mix) – 10:45
8. "Two in a Million" (Jeremy Wheatley mix) – 3:38
9. "You're My Number One" (Jeremy Wheatley mix) – 3:36
10. "Two in a Million" (Mark Picchiotti radio mix) – 3:10

== Credits and personnel ==
Credits are lifted from the S Club album booklet.

Studio

- Mastered at Transfermation (London, England)

Personnel

- Dufflebag Boys – writing
- Anna Ross – backing vocals
- Absolute – all instruments, production
- Milton McDonald – guitars
- The Kick Horns – brass, brass arrangement
- Paul P-Dub Walton – engineering
- Steve Fitzmaurice – engineering, mixing
- Jeremy Wheatley - mixing (Miami 7 version)
- Keith Uddin – mixing assistant
- Noel Summerville – mastering
- Richard Dowling – mastering

== Charts ==
All entries charted with "Two in a Million".

=== Weekly charts ===
Chart (1999–2000)	Peak position
Europe (Eurochart Hot 100)	11
Ireland (IRMA)	8
Scotland Singles (OCC)	4
UK Singles (OCC)	2

=== Year-end charts ===
Chart (1999)	Position
UK Singles (OCC)	83

Chart (2000)	Position
UK Singles (OCC)	167

== 2024 remix ==
On 9 October 2024, British supermarket chain Waitrose released an advert featuring the reformed S Club dancing to a new Jax Jones remix of "You're My Number One" (titled "You’re My No.1").
