= Tina Barrett =

English singer and actress (born 1976)

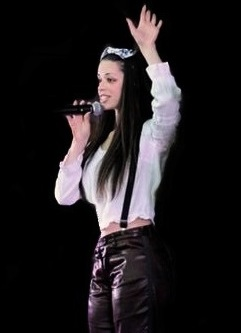
- Barrett in 2018
- Born: Tina Ann Barrett; 16 September 1976 (age 49); Hammersmith, London, England
- Occupations: Singer; actress
- Years active: 1996–present
- Musical career
- Genres: Pop; electropop
- Member of: S Club

Tina Ann Barrett (born 16 September 1976) is an English singer and actress. Her major breakthrough came in 1999 when she became a member of the pop group S Club. She has been a member of spin-off group S Club Allstars (previously S Club 3) since 2014. She is also a former member of the girl group Mis-Teeq, but never appeared on any of their recordings.

== Early life ==
Tina Barrett was born in Hammersmith, London, England, to an English father and a Guyanese mother. She was at London's Arts Educational School for eight years. Her first job was dancing in a pantomime with Lionel Blair, and she was a dancer in videos and TV performances for music artists, most notably Pulp as a showgirl in their video for "This Is Hardcore", and as an extra in the video for "You're the One I Love" by Shola Ama. She was originally going to be in the group Face2Face, which went on to become Mis-Teeq, and assisted with the group's choreography.

== Career ==
=== 1996–1998: Mis-Teeq ===
In 1996, Barrett, Alesha Dixon and Sabrina Washington became friends in a dance studio in Fulham. The trio, named Face2Face, performed singing and dancing. The group had started work on their debut album when Barrett left to join S Club 7 after a successful audition for Simon Fuller. After her departure, the group changed their name to Mis-Teeq and replaced her with two new members, Su-Elise Nash and Zena McNally.

=== 1999–2003: S Club and hiatus ===
Barrett became a member of S Club after a series of auditions, along with members Paul Cattermole, Jon Lee, Bradley McIntosh, Jo O'Meara, Hannah Spearritt and Rachel Stevens in 1999. During five years they released four number one singles and one number one album. They also had a series of TV shows, which were: Miami 7, L.A. 7, Hollywood 7 and Viva S Club, and they also starred in a film, Seeing Double. Barrett led some of the tracks on the groups' albums, such as "I'll Be There" and "Stronger", which was set to be a single, but was canceled when Paul Cattermole left the group. The song, along with the remixes, was eventually only released as a promotional single. Barrett co-wrote two other songs that she also led: "Discotek" (the B-side to the single "Alive") and "Secret Love", a song from the group's final album Seeing Double. The six remaining members stayed together as "S Club" until 2003, when they split after releasing their greatest hits album.

When the group announced they were to break up, Barrett expressed interest in working on a solo career, but she was unsuccessful to sign with a label or an entrepreneur. She took a nine-year hiatus from her career, appearing only on red carpets and social events.

=== 2012–present: Music releases, S Club Allstars and S Club 7 reunion ===
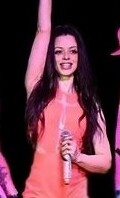
Barrett performing with S Club during their Bring It All Back 2015 tour in May 2015

In May 2012, a teaser video for Barrett's debut solo single "Fire" was released on YouTube and a short clip of the still unfinished video was shown during an interview on LIVE!. The final version of the music video was released on 27 September 2012. Barrett announced that her debut album would be released in the end of 2013 and that she intends to tour with the album, but the album has not yet materialised. Barrett has also appeared in other music videos which include Russell Grant's version of "The Clapping Song" and as the main dancer in Asian artist Navin Kundra's song "Shudaayi". Barrett is also heard in a song called "Boom" by Old Boy which also features rapper Nasty Jack; an accompanying music video has been shot but has not yet been released. In 2014 Barrett joined with O'Meara, McIntosh and Cattermole in the S Club 3, which became S Club Party.

In November 2014, Barrett reunited with the full group for a medley of S Club 7's greatest hits on BBC Children in Need. Later, the group announced a sold out arena reunion tour, titled Bring It All Back 2015, which toured the UK in May 2015. Following the reunion tour, Barrett continued to perform with O'Meara and McIntosh as S Club 3. In November 2016, Barrett released the single "All Fired Up". In January 2020, Barrett released "Mwah Mwah", along with the music video filmed in Canada during the S Club 3 tour in the summer of 2019. When O'Meara left in 2020, she was replaced the following year by S Club 8 original member Stacey Franks, and the group was renamed "S Club Allstars".

S Club 7 announced another reunion in February 2023, marking their 25th anniversary.

== Personal life ==
In March 2016, Barrett announced she was pregnant with her first child. Three months later, she gave birth to a boy.

== Discography ==
=== Singles ===
Song	Year
"Fire"	2012
"Makin Me Dance"	2013
"All Fired Up" (featuring Chris Keen)	2016
"Mwah Mwah" (featuring 80 Empire)	2020
"Private Dance Instructor"	2020

=== Music videos ===
Song	Year	Artist	Notes
"Da Ya Think I'm Sexy?"	2004	Unknown	Guest appearance; The Girls of FHM music video
"The Clapping Song"	2012	Unknown	Guest appearance; Russell Grant music video
"Shudaayi"	2012	Unknown	Guest appearance; Navin Kundra music video
"Fire"	2012	Unknown	
"Makin Me Dance"	2013	Unknown	
"Mwah Mwah"	2020	Fatty Soprano	
"Private Dance Instructor"	2020		

== Stage work ==
Year	Title	Role
2013–14	Beauty and the Beast	Beauty
2014	The Wizard of Oz	Wicked Witch of the West
2015	Dick Whittington	Fairy Bowbells

== Filmography ==
Films
Year	Title	Role	Notes
2003	Seeing Double	Tina	Main role

Television
Year	Title	Role	Notes
1999	Miami 7	Tina	Main Role
1999	Back to the '50s	Tina	Television film
1999	Boyfriends & Birthdays	Tina	Television film
1999	The Greatest Store in the World	Herself	Television film
2000	L.A. 7	Tina	Main Role
2000	S Club 7 Go Wild!	Herself	Reality television
2000	Artistic Differences	Tina	Television film
2000	Christmas Special	Tina	Television film
2001	Hollywood 7	Tina	Main role
2001	S Club Search	Judge / Mentor	Reality television
2002	Viva S Club	Tina	Main role
