= Miami 7 =

Television series

- Also known as: S Club 7 in Miami
- Directed by: Andrew Margetson
- Starring: S Club 7 Alfie Wise; Paul Louis
- Opening theme: "Bring It All Back"
- Countries of origin: United Kingdom; United States
- Original language: English
- No. of series: 1
- No. of episodes: 13

Production
- Executive producers: Simon Fuller; Malcolm Gerrie; Christopher Pilkington
- Running time: 25 mins (approx)
- Production companies: Initial; Polydor

Original release
- Network: CBBC (on BBC One)
- Release: 8 April – 1 July 1999

Related
- Back to the '50s; Boyfriends & Birthdays; L.A. 7 (2000); Hollywood 7 (2001); Viva S Club (2002)

Miami 7 (known as S Club 7 in Miami in the United States) is a television series starring English pop group S Club 7. Thirteen episodes were produced and aired on CBBC from 8 April to 1 July 1999. During each episode, the members would perform one of the songs from their first album S Club. All seven members of the group star as fictionalised versions of themselves. It was created and partially written by Kim Fuller (brother of the group's manager), who also created and wrote the Spice Girls' 1997 film Spice World.

Renamed as S Club 7 in Miami, the show broadcast in the United States on Fox Family from 1999 until 2002. It also aired on VRAK.TV, MusiquePlus and BBC Kids in Canada and Nickelodeon in Latin America.

== Plot ==
The show saw the group, desperate to make it big, offered a chance for success in Miami by their management. Instead, the gang find themselves working in a hotel for Howard and Marvin Borlotti and entertaining the guests of the hotel. They learn to deal with the culture shock of being in a new country and eventually enjoy and somewhat become accustomed to what America has to offer.

=== Recurring elements ===
- The group would always sing one of their songs at the end of every episode, with the exception of episode two where the group sing "Tie a Yellow Ribbon" and episode eleven where they sing "Dancing Queen", which was recorded for the Abbamania soundtrack.

== Cast ==
=== Main ===
- Hannah Spearritt as Hannah
- Paul Cattermole as Paul
- Tina Barrett as Tina
- Rachel Stevens as Rachel
- Bradley McIntosh as Bradley
- Jo O'Meara as Jo
- Jon Lee as Jon
- Alfie Wise as Howard Borlotti
- Paul Louis as Marvin Borlotti

=== Recurring ===
- Gary Whelan as Danny Parsons
- Tyler Cravens as Rayland Crowe
- Tom Nowicki as Director
- Richard Braine as Magician
- Barry Brandt as Police Officer
- Regina Freedman as Secretary
- Cathy Dennis as Jill Ward

== Episodes ==
No.	Title	Directed by	Written by	Featured song(s)	Original release date	US airdate
1	"Take Off"	Andrew Margeston	Kim Fuller	"Everybody Wants Ya" "It's a Feel Good Thing (Buenos Tiempos)"	8 April 1999	6 November 1999
The gang are demoralised by bad management and a lack of decent gigs, but when they are sent to Miami to perform they see it as their chance to find fame and fortune. The group arrives at the Paradise Hotel expecting to live a life of luxury; however, hotel manager Howard Borlotti has other plans for S Club 7.
2	"Howard's Hotel"	Andrew Margeston	Kim Fuller	"I Really Miss You" "Tie a Yellow Ribbon Round the Ole Oak Tree" "S Club Party"	15 April 1999	6 November 1999
The band members find that the hotel is not as glamorous as the group's agent promised them. Instead of singing and performing, the gang have to work as hotel employees, rather than as full-time performers. When Howard does ask the group to sing, his choice of song is not from their original songs and is not their musical style. After being booed by the hotel crowd for the poor song choice, they promptly retaliate by performing their own song "S Club Party".
3	"The Blue Chevy"	Andrew Margeston	Kim Fuller	"Down at Club S"	22 April 1999	12 November 1999
The group persuades Howard to pay them decent wages and sell them his spare car, which promptly breaks down. Jo and Bradley decide to secretly take parts from Howard's Red Chevy and put them in their own car (a 1955 Chevrolet Bel Air convertible).
4	"Wind Resistance"	Andrew Margeston	Paul Alexander and Simon Braithwaite	"Everybody Wants Ya"	29 April 1999	13 November 1999
With a hurricane en route, Howard leaves Paul in charge of the hotel and the Hawaiian Luau party he has planned for its guests. Unfortunately, Paul becomes extremely bossy and forces the group to wear grass skirts. As the storm rages, the gang discover Howard has taken shelter in the basement, and persuade him that the hurricane has passed.
5	"The Man from E.M.I."	Andrew Margeston	Georgia Pritchett	"Two in a Million"	6 May 1999	20 November 1999
The gang are excited to hear that the head of EMI Records is staying at the hotel. Meanwhile, Rachel is upset that her boyfriend has not written yet, whilst Jo becomes angry at her boyfriend, Robert, for writing too often. Jo decides to break up with him only to discover that her boyfriend is standing behind her. Jo then fixes her mistake by writing and performing a song dedicating her love for him, during which he hooks up with the executive woman, who specialises in elevator music.
6	"Alligator"	Andrew Margeston	Paul Dornan	"So Right"	13 May 1999	26 November 1999
Howard finds himself with a date with a swimsuit model and Rachel, Tina and Jo set about giving him a complete makeover. Meanwhile, the boys and Hannah decide to free their boss's pet alligator, Clint, but are disappointed when Clint returns. Marvin explains to them that he is a homing (domesticated but allowed some freedom) alligator. Howard's date is a disaster – his dinner partner, Arlene, has no fashion sense. He returns home disappointed, but apparently he has taken his new-found metrosexuality a bit too seriously.
7	"Volleyball"	Andrew Margetson	Paul Dornan	"You're My Number One"	20 May 1999	27 November 1999
The group give Jon tips on chatting up girls. They are also given a volleyball lesson by some locals, who turn out to be workers at Howard's cousin Hank's hotel. Howard decides to set up a volleyball match between the two hotels and bets that S Club will lose. S Club are fuming and do everything they can to win the match.
8	"Alien Hunter"	Andrew Margetson	Paul Alexander and Simon Braithwaite	"We Can Work It Out"	27 May 1999	4 December 1999
The band become the stars of the fictional hit TV series, Alien Hunter; the hotel is used as a filming location. Tina, dressed as an alien, falls asleep in a laundry truck and wakes up in a busy shopping mall on the other side of the city, where she meets a handsome photographer. Meanwhile, Tina's dad suddenly turns up at Paradise Hotel and blames Howard for her mysterious disappearance. Meanwhile, Rachel and Hannah have a slight falling out over Rachel teasing Hannah about her role on the show.
9	"Missing"	Andrew Margetson	Georgia Pritchett	"I Really Miss You"	3 June 1999	11 December 1999
Howard loses S Club, in a card game, to his cousin Hank, who runs the nearby Sunset Sands Hotel, which seems to resemble what their agent in England promised them. As Hank treats the band worse than Howard, the band begin to realise that working for Howard is not as bad as they had thought. With the group away from the hotel, Howard and Marvin's profits are down and they are actually missing the gang, so they set up another card game to win them back.
10	"Court in the Act"	Andrew Margetson	Paul Alexander and Simon Braithwaite	"Bring It All Back"	10 June 1999	18 December 1999
Howard erects a sculpture of himself outside S Club's dormitories and gets into trouble with Raylan Crowe from the Department of Labour for employing foreigners at the hotel. In court, the band persuades the judge to let them stay by performing, whilst Howard is fined $5,000. To raise the money, he tries to sell the statue, which crumbles around him.
11	"Bermuda Triangle"	Andrew Margetson	Georgia Pritchett	"Dancing Queen"	17 June 1999	8 January 2000
Wanting a day off, S Club 7 borrow Howard's boat and take a cruise back to the 1970s. Along the way they meet Elvis, Madonna and Cher before returning to 1999 where they discover that Howard has changed.
12	"How Deep is Your Love"	Andrew Margeston	Paul Alexander and Simon Braithwaite	"Hope for the Future"	24 June 1999	22 January 2000
The group is given a holiday when the Department of Health shuts down Howard's hotel, so they head to the Miami Seaquarium to swim with dolphins. Rachel meets a photographer who reckons she would make a good model and Paul falls for scuba instructor Janeane, who seemingly likes him too. The others are not so sure though when they catch Janeane kissing another guy and discover she has also been dating Bradley.
13	"Reprise"	Andrew Margeston	Kim Fuller	"Gonna Change the World"	1 July 1999	5 February 2000
With their contract with Howard about to end and their deal with their old manager now expired, the gang look back over their time in Miami. They have lunch with Jill Ward (the star of Alien Hunter), who advises them to travel to Los Angeles to make a name for themselves. Howard has a "realization" that maybe he was a little too hard on S Club and tries to "apologize" to them and persuade them to stay. They refuse because they feel like they will be going nowhere as where they first started, although Howard is much closer to them than before, even admitting that he loves them and sharing an emotional goodbye with them. At the end of the episode, they have to decide between moving on to Los Angeles or returning to England to renew their expired management deal or split up as a group when they come across an intersection between the airport and the road to the LA. At the last second, they turn the car towards the long road to LA.

=== Specials ===
No.	Title	Featured song(s)	Original release date	U.S. airdate
1	"Back to the '50s"	"You're My Number One" "Friday Night" "Viva La Fiesta" "S Club Party"	18 September 1999 (ITV)	11 March 2000
The group begin their journey to Los Angeles from Miami. After accidentally coming across a time portal, they find a town in the 1950s, which is dominated by a gang.
2	"Boyfriends & Birthdays"	"Bring It All Back" "Reach" "Two in a Million"	12 December 1999	29 May 2000
S Club take a rest stop at a trailer park near Paradise Beach in Smalltown, where they meet a family who live in an RV. They discover that the father may or may not arrive to attend the son's birthday, so they strive to make his birthday the best ever. Meanwhile, Rachel receives a call from her boyfriend back home, who asks her to choose: him or the group.

== Telecast and home release ==
Miami 7 was aired on CBBC in the United Kingdom from 8 April until 1 July 1999 with repeats until 2002. The series was also repeated on channels such as Play UK and Disney Channel.

The show was renamed as S Club 7 in Miami, was taken to America where it aired on Fox Family (now Freeform) from 1999 to 2002. In foreign countries, It also aired on VRAK.TV, MusiquePlus and BBC Kids in Canada and Nickelodeon in Latin America.

Miami 7 was released on PAL video in 2000. It was released both as three individual cassettes or in a "Complete Boxset" containing all thirteen episodes. The first two volumes were also released on NTSC video however the third volume (containing the final six episodes) was never released. Also along with the L.A. 7 and Hollywood 7 series, it was never released on DVD. The NTSC version also contained bonus scenes and extra footage.

In November 2023, the series was made available to stream in the UK on BBC iPlayer.

== Ratings ==
The show was watched by 90 million viewers in over 100 countries.

In 2002, the dates were: Tuesday 19 February – 60,000

Thursday 21 February – 70,000
