= Robbie Glover (singer) =

English singer-songwriter

Background information
- Born: Leeds, England
- Genres: Pop
- Occupations: Singer, songwriter, drummer
- Website: www.robbieglover.com

Robbie Glover is a British singer-songwriter from Leeds, England. In 2006, the BBC reported that he was the first act in history, with no label or management at the time, to achieve two Kanal 77 People's Choice number one records. The records spent 12 consecutive weeks in the Kanal 77 chart, removing U2 from the chart top, and was voted in by the people across Eastern Europe (Note: Main coverage being Greece, Bulgaria, Macedonia, Yugoslavia and Albania), of which he also was voted in as the second most popular record of the year.

== Career ==
Glover comes from Leeds, where at the age of five he was given his first drum kit, subsequently joining the Leeds College of Music's junior concert band, under Guy Scarlet, giving him the opportunity of playing at the Royal Albert Hall at the age of 12. He later went on as a singer-songwriter, which he toured the UK alongside successful chart acts, appearing on various Radio Roadshows.

When he achieved his first People's Choice number one, he appeared on various mainstream UK media including ITV, Channel 4, BBC, The Sun, VH1.Com, as well as coverage from the story making its way to Yahoo Oz & Nz and Undercover Media (Australia). Glover was voted the second most popular artist of the year on the Kanal 77 radio network, the charts were submitted and published in Тин-шема magazine over in the voting countries. The Stage said In Macedonia Robbie Glover is more popular than Britney, Kylie and Sophie Elis Bextor

Glover flew over to Amsterdam where he wrote and recorded the track "Hot Girls" which became the second people's choice hit, where in the European radio chart it lasted some 12 consecutive weeks, the track receiving massive club support which was remixed by Robbie T, and subsequently released on vinyl a version that featured a version of John Legend's "Save Room" alongside extensive radio play on BBC Radio 1Xtra. This later lead to his track "Hot Girls" appearing on the albums 100% Garage & Bassline & Streetz Vol8 & 100 Hits Garage & Bassline compiled by Ministry of Sound and distributed via Sony Digital Audio Disc Corporation & Demon Music Group in the UK and Internationally. The album 100 Hits Garage & Bassline spent 9 consecutive weeks in the official UK album compilation charts Matt Goss had him appear in his music video for the track I Need The Key, which was aired on several music channels and Never Mind The Buzzcocks

Glover has also worked with Dee Tails, who appears on the tracks "Breaking The Rules", "Nasty Funk", and "Gotta Get Away" all written by Glover & Dee Tails and recorded with Oscar Lo Brutto (Engineer for Chipmunk and Wretch 32), the tracks have been supported by DJs nationwide including Matt 'Jam' Lamont and DJ Charma, as well as BBC Radio 1Xtra, Ministry of Sound and appearing on over 95% of the digital jukebox's in pubs and bars up and down the UK courtesy of Sound Leisure, "Gotta Get Away" has also been remixed by Robert Vadney, best known for his work alongside Paul Oakenfold and his Perfecto label.

Alongside Dee Tails, Glover has feature's from Bradley McIntosh of S Club 7. on his track Hands Up which he co-wrote, and was recorded and produced in Essex.

Many of his tracks, such as "Foolin" have had releases in Spain and various other places via producers and DJs releasing their own bootlegs inspired from his music. Vaden – one of the most active Garage propagandists, based in Russia, added "Hot Girls" to his 2 Step Nights CD compilation in April 2010.

== Anti-weapons stance ==
In a newspaper interview in 2008, following the attack of a friend with a knife, Glover spoke out against people who carry knives. The paper said,

A record breaking R&B artist has branded knife-wielders "cowards" after adding his weight to the Recorder's Respect Life campaign.
