= Back to the '50s =

- Also known as: Back to the Fifties
- Genre: Sitcom; Family Entertainment
- Written by: Paul Alexander, Simon Braithwaite, Paul Dornan, Kim Fuller and Georgia Pritchett
- Directed by: Andrew Margeston
- Starring: S Club 7
- Opening theme: "S Club Party"
- Country of origin: United Kingdom
- Original language: English
- No. of episodes: 1

Production
- Executive producer: Simon Fuller
- Production locations: Miami, Florida, United States
- Running time: 55 minutes (approx.)
- Production companies: 19 Entertainment; Steelhead Productions

Original release
- Network: ITV (CITV)
- Release: 18 September 1999

Related
- Miami 7 Boyfriends & Birthdays

Back to the '50s is the first one-off sitcom from the British pop group S Club 7. It first aired in 1999 and was produced for CITV. In this film, the cast proceeds with their long drive from Miami to Los Angeles – when they suddenly find themselves in 1959, having travelled back in time. The episode itself is a parody of the films Grease and Back to the Future.

== Plot ==
S Club 7 are driving from Miami to Los Angeles. Rachel points out the milometre has reached all the nines. As it turns back to all the zeroes, obliviously, they drive through a wormhole. The radio turns on playing 1950s music, and arriving at Townville, they soon start spotting old-fashioned objects, including The Big Cup Diner, a diner that sells a burger, fries and a soda float for just 20 cents. They realise they have gone back 40 years to the year 1959. As they figure out how to get back to the future, the local Sheriff Bukovski approaches them accusing them of being troublemakers, and says he will be keeping an eye on them.

They go bowling, and a gang called the Rockets enters the bowling alley. The leader Ricky accuses Bradley of stealing his girlfriend Shirelle and starts a fight with him. Bukovski, who turns out to be Ricky's uncle, accuses S Club 7 of starting the fight and arrests Bradley, Jo, Paul, and Rachel. They are released the following morning and told they have until sunset to leave town.

Returning to the diner, they meet the waiter Chuck Martindale, whom Hannah has a crush on, and his father Hank, the owner of the diner. He reveals that since the feud between him and Ricky's dad Dicky started, Ricky and Dicky have attempted to put the diner out of business, including breaking the jukebox to jeopardise the upcoming jukebox night. S Club 7 save the night by performing, but afterwards, Hannah and Chuck are forced to say an emotional goodbye as S Club 7 leave, narrowly avoiding Bukovski seeing them.

They drive all night and arrive back in Townville to see the diner boarded up. Chuck tells them it has been closed for weeks; S Club 7 realise they have moved 1 month into the future. The Rockets have been causing trouble, forcing Hank to consider selling the diner to Dicky. Finding Ricky at a garage preparing for a big race the next day, they challenge him to a race over their car and the deed to the diner. Later on, Chuck, having attempted to intervene in the argument, admits to Hannah his guilt for not doing enough to help S Club 7.

At the race, they find a newspaper in the car that is dated the next day, with an article predicting Chuck's death in the race. Hannah stops Chuck from driving in their place, revealing to him that they were sent from the future to avert his death and that he will go on to do great things in the future. Convinced by a kiss from Hannah, Chuck allows Rachel to drive as previously planned. The race is close with Ricky set to win, but his car engine fails and he ends up crashing into a bush, resulting in S Club 7 winning the race. As Hank and Dicky finally reconcile their differences, the Rockets despair at losing their "cool gang" status, but S Club 7 convince them to stay in town.

After holding an impromptu party for the townspeople, S Club 7 say their goodbyes, including a last kiss between Hannah and Chuck. They drive back through a wormhole to 1999 and see Ricky now as a middle-aged mechanic, Chuck now being the town governor, and the diner renamed the "Famous S Club 7 Diner".

== Cast ==
=== S Club 7 ===
- Tina Barrett
- Paul Cattermole
- Jon Lee
- Bradley McIntosh
- Jo O'Meara
- Hannah Spearritt
- Rachel Stevens

=== Guest stars ===
- Eamon Behrens
- Paul Hayes
- David Sawyer
- Scott St. James
- Palmer Scott
- Chris Humphrey

== Songs featured ==
=== S Club 7 ===
- "S Club Party"
- "Friday Night"
- "Viva La Fiesta"
- "You're My Number One"

=== Others ===
- "Venus" by Frankie Avalon
- "A Teenager in Love" by Dion and the Belmonts
- "That'll Be the Day" by Buddy Holly and The Crickets
- "Lollipop" by The Chordettes
- "Great Balls of Fire" by Jerry Lee Lewis
- "All I Have to Do Is Dream" by The Everly Brothers
- "Tears on My Pillow" by Little Anthony and the Imperials
- "At the Hop" by Danny & the Juniors
