= Gak Jonze =

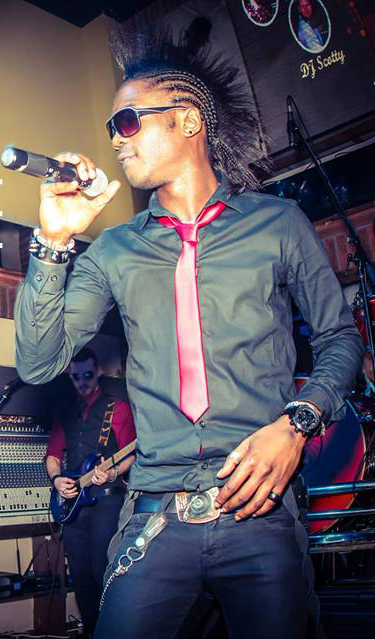

Background information
- Born: Micah Lei; 17 June 1982 (age 44); Camden Town, London, England
- Genres: Hip hop, R&B
- Occupations: Rapper, singer, songwriter, actor, record label owner
- Years active: 1998–present
- Labels: Mykali Records, Bllr Lfë
- Website: gakjonze.com

Micah Lei (born 17 June 1982), better known by the stage name Gak Jonze, is an English rapper. He released his debut album, Intelligent Mess, in 2013, through his own label Mykali Records. He has self funded his own solo tours in United Arab Emirates, Oman, Bahrain, Thailand, and China. He is currently based in Dubai, playing live and producing music.

== Early life ==
Jonze was born Mi'cah Lei in Camden Town, North London, as the youngest of six to single mother of Jamaican descent. His parents separated when Jonze was one year old. Though born and raised in the United Kingdom he moved around regularly, switching schools, and had lived in Spanish Town, Jamaica early in his teens, before moving to Tottenham, London, and later finished school at Northumberland Park Community School.

His stage name pronounced 'Jack Jones' comes from an old cockney rhyming slang, meaning 'on your own', 8 November 2013 Jonze stated to Wolverhampton's Wolf FM that the name also came from being a bit of a recluse at school. "I was always out on a mission making beats and writing and my peers would mock me, they couldn't see it so left them to it and did my own thing." He cites Jimi Hendrix, Cee-lo Green, Tupac, The Rolling Stones, Busta Rhymes and Bone Thugs-n-Harmony as musical influences.[9]

== Career ==
=== 2003–2006: First appearance ===
Gak Jonze first emerged as a feature hip hop artist supporting girlband Cherry Falls doing school tours in 2003 on indie labe Paperdoll Productions. July 2006 was Gak Jonze's first television appearance where he featured alongside stand-up comedian and presenter Dave Gorman for ITV2 show Best Man's Speech.

=== 2009–2011: City Boy Soul ===
In June 2009, Gak Jonze collaborated with Coreé Richards forming the duo band City Boy Soul. Releases included "No Regrets (Who We Are)" and "Be Ok" which featured Mutya Buena. In 2010 they stepped in for Sister Sledge headlining The 2010 Ndoro Children's Charity Gala, whilst being twice nominated for The People's Music Award. The duo toured throughout the UK between 2009 and 2011 covering nightclubs, schools and cross genre live circuit venues. They made an exclusive appearance at Party in the Park and again on Lava TV (Now Greatest Hits TV) as celebrity guest's in a Celebrity Ghost Hunt for Gorezone Magazine.

The duo disbanded in 2011, with both following solo paths.

=== Commercial breakthrough ===
With a supporting feature by Bradley McIntosh aka 'Citi Boi', Gak Jonze released his debut single "Rock Boi" via Mykali Records. Jonze and McIntosh are still friends and continue to write and collaborate on projects. On 6 May 2013, Jonze collaborated with DJ Urban to release his second studio single, "My Party". It got picked up by Zoe McNulty and was placed internationally as the official song of her 'Zumba Workout Campaign' for 2013. On 17 June, Jonze announced the release of his debut studio album Intelligent Mess.

=== 2012–present: Intelligent Mess Tour ===
With international success from his debut album, Jonze decided to fund his own international solo tour in 2013, and has performed various stages in and around Oman, Abu Dhabi. Bahrain, Dubai, Thailand, Australia and China, where he is writing his follow up album. On 12 June 2014, Jonze announced that he had been writing and collaborating with Basshunter for a song on his album and dropped hints it would be a late 2015 release. On 23 November 2014, Jonze announced he will be in collaboration with Alonestar on a couple of tracks for the new album.

Jonze has currently just returned from touring his latest material in China.

== Discography ==
Album appearances

Title	Year	Other artist(s)	Album
"Winners"	1998	Heavenli Abdi	Heavenli Abdi
"Party on Till Daylight"	1999	Taj E	Da Kameallion EP
"No Regrets (who we are)"	2010	City Boy Soul	Non-album singles
"Be Ok"	2011	Mutya Buena	Non-album singles
"Way it's Gotta Be"	2003	Cherry Falls	Da Kameallion EP
"What's Your Name?"	2011	Bradley McIntosh	-

== Filmography ==
Television
Year	Title	Role	Notes
2011	Be Ok	Gak Jonze	Main role
2011	Rock Boi	Gak Jonze	Main role
2011	Fried Rice	Voice Of 'Agent Charles Knight'	Australian Animated Movie
2006	Best Mans Speech	Gak Jonze	ITV2 Reality Show
2012	The Mad Bad Ad Show	Gak Jonze	Television Sketch
2000	Celebrity Ghost Hunt	Gak Jonze	Reality Television

Films
Year	Title	Role	Notes
2013	Fried Rice:The Movie	Voice Of 'Agent Charles Knight'	Australian Animated Television film
