= S Club 7: Christmas Special =

- Genre: Sitcom; Family Entertainment
- Written by: Kim Fuller, Georgia Prichett
- Directed by: Jeff Jones
- Starring: S Club 7
- Opening theme: "Never Had a Dream Come True"
- Country of origin: United Kingdom
- Original language: English
- No. of episodes: 1

Production
- Executive producer: Simon Fuller
- Production locations: L.A., California, United States
- Running time: 45 minutes (approx.)
- Production companies: 19 Entertainment; Popworld

Original release
- Network: ITV (CITV)
- Release: 24 December 2000

Related
- L.A. 7 Artistic Differences

S Club 7: Christmas Special is the fourth one-off programme from the British pop group S Club 7. It first aires in 2000 and is produced for CITV. In this TV special, the group are trying to get home to the UK for Christmas and New Year. To pay for flights home, the members all take on low-paying jobs in a local shopping mall. Paul gets in a car accident and loses his memory, with doctors saying he has to stay in LA for Christmas. He later regains his memory.

== Plot ==
Homesick ahead of the holidays, the members of S Club 7 are desperate to return home to the United Kingdom for Christmas and New Year. Short on funds to afford plane tickets and holiday gifts, the group secures temporary, low-paying seasonal employment at a local shopping mall in Los Angeles. Bradley is hired to portray the mall Santa Claus, while Tina and the remaining band members find work dressing up as his helper elves.

After a series of mishaps, the group is abruptly fired from the department store's "Santa's Workshop". Their travel plans are derailed further when Hannah, Bradley, and Paul are involved in a sudden car accident. While Hannah and Bradley escape uninjured, Paul suffers a severe head injury resulting in temporary amnesia.

Hospitalized in East Los Angeles, the medical staff informs the band that Paul cannot travel and must remain in the United States under observation for the holidays. Faced with a dilemma, the remaining six members refuse to leave Paul behind and decide to cancel their flights back to London. They dedicate their efforts to staging a final performance and helping Paul trigger his memories. Ultimately, Paul fully recovers his memory, allowing the band to celebrate the holiday season together.

== Production ==
=== Filming and writing ===
S Club 7: Christmas Special was directed by Jeff Jones and co-written by Kim Fuller and Georgia Pritchett. The television film was executive produced by the band's manager, Simon Fuller, under the 19 Entertainment and Popworld production banners.

Although produced primarily for a British audience on CITV, the project was filmed entirely on location in Los Angeles, California. Exterior shopping mall sequences were filmed locally, while the medical scenes involving Paul's storyline were captured at the Linda Vista Community Hospital in East Los Angeles.

== Cast ==
=== S Club 7 ===
- Tina Barrett
- Paul Cattermole
- Jon Lee
- Bradley McIntosh
- Jo O'Meara
- Hannah Spearritt
- Rachel Stevens
