= The Greatest Store in the World =

- Written by: Alex Shearer
- Directed by: Jane Prowse
- Starring: Dervla Kirwan; Peter Capaldi; Brian Blessed; Elizabeth Earl; Holly Earl; Helen Schlesinger; Ricky Tomlinson; Sean Hughes
- Country of origin: United Kingdom
- Original language: English

Production
- Production companies: Film and General Production; Production Line; The Television Production Company Plc; (in association with Carlton Television)

Original release
- Network: CBBC
- Release: 24 December 1999

The Greatest Store in the World is a book written by Alex Shearer, later made into a made-for-television film which was broadcast on 24 December 1999 by CBBC (on BBC One). The TV movie has been shown a few times at Christmas on the CBBC channel. It was filmed in the famous London department store Harrods (though the name "Harrods" is not used in the story).

== Plot ==
The story is told in flashback by Livvy (played by Elizabeth Earl), a bright young girl who is in police custody on Christmas Day. As she is questioned, she reveals that for several days, she and her equally resourceful mother Geraldine (Dervla Kirwan) and younger sister Angeline (Holly Earl) have been living in a department store called "Scottley's" since their camper van blew up. As the story progresses, the family deal with outsmarting staff, in particular Mr Whiskers (Peter Capaldi) the friendly but suspicious doorman, icy deputy manager Miss Greystone (Helen Schlesinger), and Santa (Ricky Tomlinson) and his elf (Sean Hughes). There is also a guest appearance from S Club 7 in an advertising stunt by department store owner Mr Scottley (Brian Blessed). On Christmas morning, Ms Greystone, Santa and his elf attempt to burgle the store safe.

== Cast ==
=== The Williams Family ===
- Dervla Kirwan as Geraldine
- Elizabeth Earl as Livvy
- Holly Earl as Angeline

=== Managers and Staff of Scottley's ===
- Peter Capaldi as Mr Whiskers
- Helen Schlesinger as Miss Greystone
- Ricky Tomlinson as Santa
- Sean Hughes as Elf
- Brian Blessed as Mr Scottley

=== Staff and Pupils of Livvy's School ===
- Philip Wright as Mr Norris
- Devon Anderson as David

=== Guest stars ===
- Tina Barrett as Herself
- Paul Cattermole as Himself
- Jon Lee as Himself
- Bradley McIntosh as Himself
- Jo O'Meara as Herself
- Hannah Spearritt as Herself
- Rachel Stevens as Herself

== See also ==
- List of Christmas films
