= S Club =

English pop group

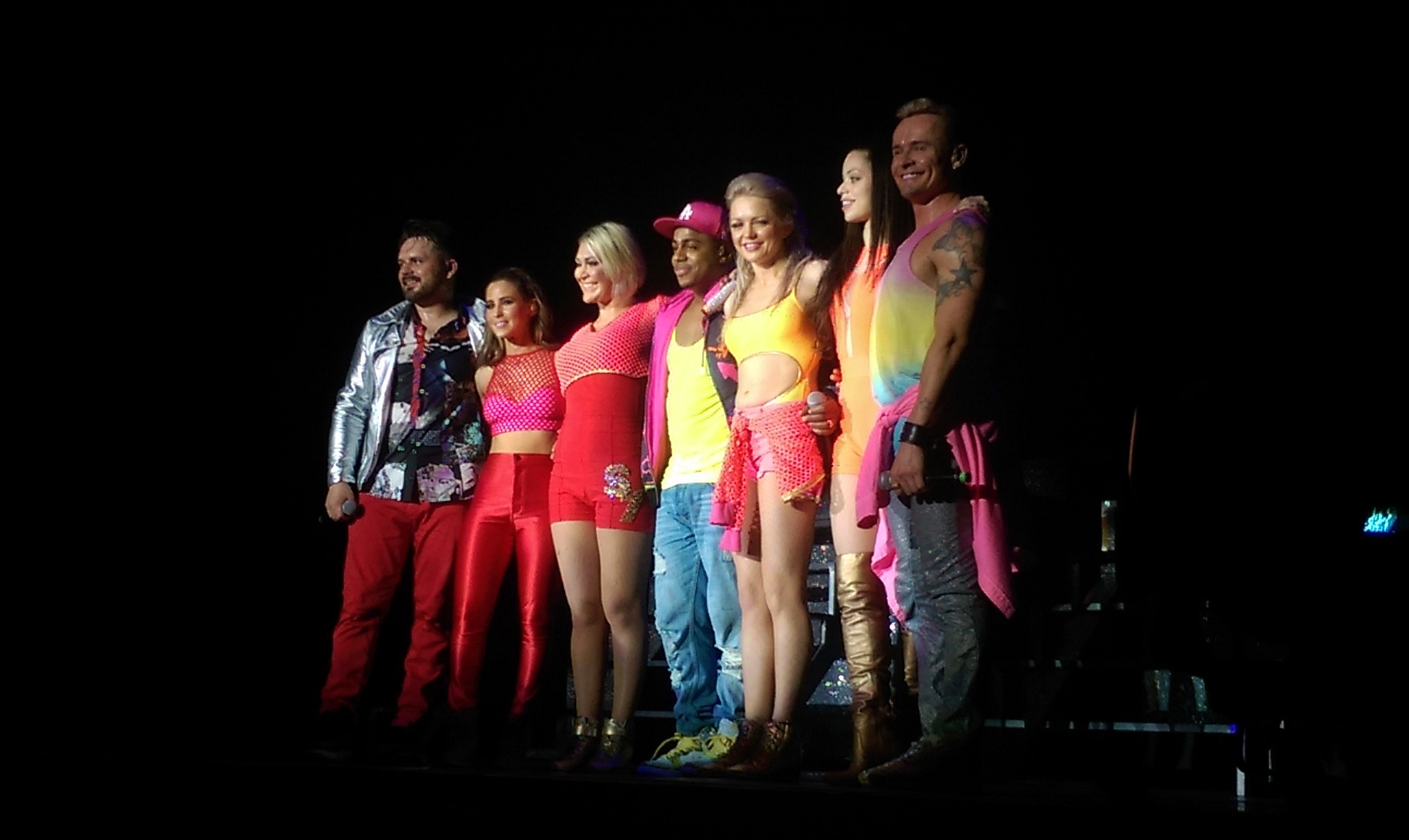
- S Club in 2015; From left: Cattermole, Stevens, O'Meara, McIntosh, Spearritt, Barrett, and Lee

Background information
- Also known as: S Club 7
- Origin: London, England
- Genres: Pop; dance-pop; teen pop
- Years active: 1998–2003; 2014–2015; 2023–present
- Labels: Polydor; A&M; Interscope; Universal
- Spinoffs: S Club 8; S Club Allstars
- Members: Tina Barrett; Jon Lee; Bradley McIntosh; Jo O'Meara; Rachel Stevens
- Past members: Paul Cattermole; Hannah Spearritt

S Club, formerly known as S Club 7, are a British pop group formed in 1998 by Simon Fuller. The original members were Tina Barrett, Paul Cattermole, Jon Lee, Bradley McIntosh, Jo O'Meara, Hannah Spearritt and Rachel Stevens.

Fuller formed S Club 7 after he was fired as the manager of the Spice Girls. Cattermole left in 2002, and they disbanded in 2003. After the members performed solo and in smaller groups, the group reunited temporarily for a short tour in 2015. In 2023, the group reunited and announced a tour; however, Cattermole died of heart failure and Spearritt withdrew from the group. The tour went ahead without Cattermole and Spearitt.

S Club have released four studio albums: S Club (1999), which reached number one in the UK, 7 (2000), Sunshine (2001), and Seeing Double (2002). They had success with songs including "Bring It All Back", "You're My Number One", "Two in a Million", "S Club Party", "Reach", "Natural", "Never Had a Dream Come True", "Don't Stop Movin'", "You", "Have You Ever", "Alive", and "Love Ain't Gonna Wait for You". In July 2023, S Club released their first new single in more than 20 years, "These Are the Days", in memory of Cattermole.

S Club have sold 2.8 million albums and 4.6 million singles in the UK and more than 10 million albums worldwide. They won the Brit Award in 2000 for British Breakthrough Act and in 2002 for British Single of the Year. In 2001, they earned the Record of the Year award.

== History ==
=== 1997–1998: Formation ===
S Club 7 were formed by Simon Fuller after he was fired as manager of the Spice Girls in November 1997. He described S Club 7 as a continuation of ideas he had for the Spice Girls, but with a softer, more uplifting image. The same songwriting team was used for both acts.

Fuller placed an advert in The Stage and held auditions with more than 10,000 applicants. Jo O'Meara and Paul Cattermole were spotted by producers from Fuller's company, 19 Management, and asked to audition. Rachel Stevens was the only member who did not audition; instead, two producers approached her and asked her to record a demo tape. According to the journalist Steven Poole, after Fuller's disagreements with the Spice Girls, he picked "the blandest, most malleable characters ... nice kids who wouldn't answer back".

Once the lineup was decided, the members flew to Italy to become acquainted with each other. Stevens said they "felt comfortable with each other from the beginning". Several members said that the "S" in S Club 7 stands for Simon, after Fuller, although the official explanation of the meaning has always been ambiguous. At one point they were nearly called Sugar Club.

=== 1999–2000: Debut and success ===
S Club 7 rose to fame in a children's television series, Miami 7, first broadcast on CBBC between April and July 1999. The members played fictional versions of themselves and went on adventures and performed a song in each episode. In the US, the show was renamed S Club 7 in Miami and broadcast on Fox Family. By 2000, it had been sold to 100 countries and viewed by 90 million people. The use of the television show to publicise the group was likened to the Monkees.

"Bring It All Back" (1999)
S Club 7's debut single and theme music to Miami 7.

S Club 7 released their debut single, "Bring It All Back", on 9 June 1999, which The Guardian likened to the Jackson 5. It reached number one on the UK singles chart and was certified platinum. S Club 7's debut album, S Club, was released in October 1999. It reached number two in the UK Albums Chart and was certified double platinum. In 2001, the group released a fashion line targeted at teenagers. In September 1999, "S Club Party" entered the UK charts at number two and number one in New Zealand. The double A-side with the ballad "Two in a Million" and the uptempo "You're My Number One", reached number two in the UK charts in December 1999.

In February 2000, S Club 7 won for British Breakthrough Act award at the 2000 BRIT Awards. Hasbro announced a licensing deal to create S Club 7 dolls. In April 2000, S Club's second television series, L.A. 7 (renamed S Club 7 in L.A. in the US), began airing. Later that year, S Club 7 starred in the television series S Club 7 Go Wild!, in which they travelled the world raising awareness of endangered species. "Reach", another retro-styled uptempo track, was released as a single in May 2000 and reached number two on the UK charts.

"Reach" (2000)
S Club 7's first single from 7 and theme tune to L.A. 7.

"Never Had a Dream Come True" (2000)
S Club 7's 2000 Children in Need song and second UK number one.

S Club 7's second album, 7, was released on 12 June 2000. It reached number one in the UK charts and was certified triple platinum in the UK and gold in the US. The second single from the album, "Natural", reached number three in September 2000. That October, S Club 7 launched the annual Poppy Appeal campaign with Dame Thora Hird. Alongside numerous other artists, they contributed vocals to a cover of the Rolling Stones song "It's Only Rock 'N' Roll" for Children's Promise, an alliance of seven children's charities. It entered the UK charts at number nineteen. In November 2000, S Club 7 recorded the ballad "Never Had a Dream Come True", the year's official song for the Children in Need charity campaign, which became a number one in the UK and a top-ten hit in the US.

=== 2001: Sunshine ===
S Club 7 released their third studio album, Sunshine, on 26 November 2001. The lead single, "Don't Stop Movin'", released in April 2001, marked a more sophisticated sound, likened to the 1983 Michael Jackson song "Billie Jean". It reached number one, went platinum and became the seventh-best-selling single of 2001. It won The Record of the Year and earned S Club 7 their second BRIT Award, this time for best British single. S Club 7 donated more than £200,000 to Children in Need after it reached number one.

"Don't Stop Movin'" (2001)
"Don't Stop Movin'" went straight to number one and was Q's No. 3 Guilty Pleasure in 2006.

On 20 March 2001, Cattermole, Lee and McIntosh were caught with cannabis in Covent Garden, London. They were cautioned by police at Charing Cross Police Station and released without charge. They released an apology through their publicity firm. BT and Cadbury, who had sponsorship deals with S Club 7, said they were "disappointed" but kept their contracts with the group, while the Quaker Oats Company ended talks with 19 Entertainment. Pepsi signed a sponsorship deal with S Club 7 within a month of the caution. PMS, a merchandising company, sued the group for £800,000, claiming that the drugs scandal ruined its sales.

After spending most of early 2001 rehearsing, the S Club Party 2001 tour began on 19 May 2001. Once the tour was over, the group flew to the United States to film the third series of their television show Hollywood 7. The group had to continuously cope with intense schedules and early starts whilst filming for the programme.

Cattermole and Spearritt began dating in 2001 and were in a relationship until 2008. The relationship was kept secret for the first six months. Cattermole later said it had been "forced" by management and did not happen "organically", as their romance had been written into Hollywood 7. Hollywood 7 aired alongside a new CBBC reality show, S Club Search, which invited children to extend the S Club brand and audition to form a younger version of the group. The new group were to be chosen to sing with S Club 7 on Children in Need 2001 and to tour with them on their future S Club 7 Carnival 2002 tour. The winning children formed a new group, S Club Juniors, and had six top-ten UK hits.

In November, they recorded a second Children in Need single, "Have You Ever", co-written by Chris Braide and Cathy Dennis. The performance on the night featured many primary school children who had pre-recorded their own versions of the chorus, including the first television appearance by S Club Juniors. The single became the S Club 7's fourth number one and the 21st-biggest-selling single of 2001.

=== 2002: Cattermole's departure ===
In January 2002, S Club 7 embarked upon their second arena tour. The third single from Sunshine, "You", reached number two in the UK. The members were disappointed by the choice of single, as they had hoped to continue the more contemporary sound established by "Don't Stop Movin'". Cattermole said later that they had "wanted to be perceived as cool since the very beginning" but that their management had "taken it away".

In 2002, Cattermole left S Club 7 to rejoin his school metal band, Skua. He later described frustration with the S Club 7 management, and said that "things were being handled so badly, I had to go". Cattermole stayed with S Club 7 until June 2002, featuring in four episodes of their final television series, Viva S Club. His final concert before his departure was Party at the Palace, part of Queen Elizabeth II's Golden Jubilee celebrations. Skua failed to secure a record deal.

After Cattermole's departure, the group was renamed S Club. The remaining members re-signed their deal with Fuller and their record company. "Alive", S Club's first single without Cattermole, reached number five on the UK singles chart, and their fourth album, Seeing Double, reached number 17. O'Meara announced that she would step back from performing for the remainder of the year due to a back condition.

=== 2003: Film and breakup ===
"Alive" (2002)
S Club's first single as S Club and theme tune to Viva S Club

"Say Goodbye" (2003)
The group's final single

In April 2003, S Club released their first feature film, Seeing Double, a children's fantasy, in which the group fought the evil scientist Victor Gaghan in his quest to clone the world's pop stars. The film's release was marred by rumours that the group were about to split, which they denied.

According to Spearritt, of the €75 million the group had made for Fuller, whilst the members had received €150,000 each a year. The group members travelled economy on flights and prepared their own food and laundry when working abroad. Spearritt's parents reportedly hired lawyers to collect payments owed to them by Fuller and his management company.

Ten days after the release of Seeing Double, during their S Club United tour on 21 April 2003, S Club announced on stage that they were breaking up. They cited a mutual split, saying it was time "to move on and to face new challenges". Spearritt said that "she and her fellow bandmates wanted to do their own thing". Fans expressed anger after S Club had denied rumours of a split only weeks prior. Their final single was a double A-side, coupling "Love Ain't Gonna Wait for You", from their fourth album Seeing Double, with a new ballad, "Say Goodbye", released on 26 May, which reached number two in the UK. On 2 June, a greatest hits album, Best: The Greatest Hits of S Club 7, was released, containing the previously unreleased track, "Everybody Get Pumped". It reached number two in the United Kingdom.

=== 2003–2008: Solo projects ===
In 2003, Stevens signed a £1.5 million four-album deal with Polydor and Fuller. Her debut solo album, Funky Dory, reached number nine on the UK Albums Chart and was certified gold. In 2004, Spearritt acted in the films Agent Cody Banks 2: Destination London and Seed of Chucky, and played the lead role of Abby Maitland for five series of the ITV science fiction series Primeval.

In January 2007, O'Meara joined the fifth series of the British reality television show Celebrity Big Brother, broadcast on Channel 4. She and other contestants Danielle Lloyd and Jade Goody were accused of making racist and bullying comments about the Indian contestant Shilpa Shetty, including saying that Indians were thin because they were "sick all the time" as a result of undercooking their food. The incident drew record numbers of viewer complaints and international media coverage. After leaving the show, O'Meara denied that she was racist and said that the show's editing had misconstrued her behaviour.

In 2008, O'Meara, Cattermole and McIntosh began performing at British nightclubs, universities and holiday camps as S Club 3, joined occasionally by other former members. Cattermole later declared bankruptcy and sold his 2000 BRIT Award at auction. He worked various other jobs, such as a community radio manager and as a psychic.

=== 2014–2015: Reunion ===
On 14 November 2014, S Club 7 reunited for a BBC Children in Need telethon, performing a medley of "S Club Party", "Reach", "Bring It All Back" and "Don't Stop Movin'". On 28 April 2015, S Club 7 reissued Best: The Greatest Hits of S Club 7, with a previously unreleased song, "Rain", as well as "Friday Night" from the S Club album. In May, S Club 7 performed in UK arenas on the Bring It All Back 2015 tour. By December 2017, the group had reverted to a trio once more and released the single, "Family".

In 2019, Cattermole said that Fuller, not the group members, had been signed to Polydor as S Club 7. The members were merely affiliates and received "pittance" from merchandise. In January 2023, Spearritt said she had been forced into homelessness, living in four temporary homes over a six-month period. She said that people wrongly assumed the members of S Club 7 were millionaires, and that they had not been on a good wage compared to the modern music industry.

=== 2023–present: Second reunion and death of Cattermole ===
On 13 February 2023, S Club 7 announced on The One Show that they would reunite for a two-week 25th-anniversary tour that October. On 6 April, at age 46, Cattermole died from cardiac arrhythmia, acute myocardial ischemia and severe coronary artery atheroma and intraplaque haemorrhage. Following his death, Best: The Greatest Hits of S Club 7 reached number seven on the Official Album Downloads Chart Top 100. On 14 May, the group announced they had changed their name back to S Club and that they would honour their planned tour as the Good Times Tour as a tribute to Cattermole. Lee stated that Spearritt would not join them on the tour, but added that the door would always be open for her to return in the future. On 30 June, "Don't Stop Movin'" entered the vinyl charts at number one.

On 26 July, S Club released their first new single in more than 20 years, "These Are the Days", in memory of Cattermole. It was written and produced by S Club's original songwriting team; Barrett described it as "a nod to our old sound". Spearritt did not take part, saying she was still too upset by Cattermole's death.

The group partnered with the British Heart Foundation to raise awareness of heart conditions and raise funds for research. The Good Times Tour began on 12 October at the Manchester Arena, with the group paying tribute to Cattermole. A review noted that the members may have been lip syncing during some of their UK tour performances. The group also announced their first ever North American tour as a second leg of their Good Times tour.

S Club performed at the 2023 Jingle Bell Ball on 10 December. On 7 March 2024, a new version "Good Times", featuring McIntosh and Lee on lead vocals, was released on digital platforms in honour of Cattermole's birthday. S Club supported Boyzone as part of their "Two for the Road" event at London's Emirates Stadium on 5 June 2026.

== Musical style ==
The style of music of S Club 7 is usually pop, or more specifically bubblegum pop. Their first two singles had vocals shared equally amongst the seven members of the group, and it was not until their third single, "Two in a Million", that O'Meara became known as their lead vocalist. Although the band were to progressively change their style over the four years they were together, even their first album had many tracks atypical of the pop genre: "You're My Number One" and "Everybody Wants Ya" were Motown-driven, whereas "Viva La Fiesta" and "It's a Feel Good Thing" were both bouncy, salsa-driven Latino songs. Over the years their style and direction changed progressively with each new album. Their second album 7 had songs with styles that somewhat opposed the traditional pop songs that rival pop bands of the nineties were releasing. With the release of "Natural" in 2000, S Club 7 showcased a new R&B-lite sound. The release of their third album, Sunshine, gave audiences their biggest change: the album contained tracks such as the disco-influenced "Don't Stop Movin'" and the R&B ballad "Show Me Your Colours". The album marked a more mature approach for the band. After the departure of Cattermole, S Club released their fourth and final album, Seeing Double, including the single "Alive", which was called a power-packed dance floor filler. The single has a style similar to that of their final single, "Love Ain't Gonna Wait for You". The album contained dance tracks that varied from their original bubblegum pop stylings.

A reviewer for The Guardian, referring to "Gangsta Love", said "S Club's spiritual home is the suburban disco, not urban underground clubs, and their attempt to go garage on "Gangsta Love" ends up amusing rather than authentic".

== Awards and nominations ==
Award	Year	Nominee(s)	Category	Result	Ref.
Brit Awards	2000	Themselves	British Breakthrough Act	Won	
Brit Awards	2000	Themselves	British Pop Newcomer	Nominated	
Brit Awards	2000	Themselves	British Pop Act	Nominated	
Brit Awards	2001	Themselves	British Pop Act	Nominated	
Brit Awards	2002	Themselves	British Pop Act	Nominated	
Brit Awards	2002	"Don't Stop Movin'"	British Single of the Year	Won	
MTV Europe Music Awards	2001	Themselves	Best UK & Ireland Act	Nominated	
Popjustice £20 Music Prize	2003	"Say Goodbye"	Best British Pop Single	Nominated	
The Record of the Year	1999	"Bring It All Back"	Record of the Year	Nominated	
The Record of the Year	2000	"Reach"	Record of the Year	Nominated	
The Record of the Year	2001	"Don't Stop Movin'"	Record of the Year	Won	
Smash Hits Poll Winners Party	2002	Themselves	Best Band on Planet Pop	4th place	
Smash Hits Poll Winners Party	2002	Themselves	Best UK Band	4th place	
Smash Hits Poll Winners Party	2002	Themselves	Best Live Act	7th place	
Smash Hits Poll Winners Party	2002	Sunshine	Best Album	6th place	
Smash Hits Poll Winners Party	2002	Rachel Stevens	Most Fanciable Female	2nd place	
Smash Hits Poll Winners Party	2002	Hannah Spearritt	Most Fanciable Female	6th place	

== Group members ==
=== Current ===
- Tina Barrett (1998–2003, 2014–2015, 2023–present)
- Jon Lee (1998–2003, 2014–2015, 2023–present)
- Bradley McIntosh (1998–2003, 2014–2015, 2023–present)
- Jo O'Meara (1998–2003, 2014–2015, 2023–present)
- Rachel Stevens (1998–2003, 2014–2015, 2023–present)

=== Former ===
- Paul Cattermole (1998–2002, 2014–2015, 2023; died 2023)
- Hannah Spearritt (1998–2003, 2014–2015, 2023)

== Discography ==
- S Club (1999)
- 7 (2000)
- Sunshine (2001)
- Seeing Double (2002)

== Filmography ==
Television
Year	Title	Role	Notes
1999	Miami 7	Acting as fictionalised versions of themselves	Sitcom; known as S Club 7 in Miami in USA
1999	Back to the '50s	Acting as fictionalised versions of themselves	One-off specials; continuation of Miami 7 storyline
1999	Boyfriends & Birthdays	Acting as fictionalised versions of themselves	One-off specials; continuation of Miami 7 storyline
1999	The Greatest Store in the World	Cameo	Drama; Features the song "You're My Number One"
2000	L.A. 7	Acting as fictionalised versions of themselves	Sitcom; continuation of Miami 7 storyline. Known as S Club 7 in L.A in USA
2000	S Club 7 Go Wild!	Hosts	Television documentary in collaboration with World Wide Fund for Nature
2000	Artistic Differences	Acting as fictionalised versions of themselves	One-off specials; continuation of L.A. 7 storyline
2000	S Club 7: Christmas Special	Acting as fictionalised versions of themselves	One-off specials; continuation of L.A. 7 storyline
2000	ITV Panto: Aladdin	Acting as themselves	Festive television special, also performed "Never Had a Dream Come True"
2001	Hollywood 7	Acting as fictionalised versions of themselves	Sitcom; continuation of Miami 7 and L.A. 7 storylines. Known as S Club 7 in Hollywood in USA
2001	S Club Search	Performed the role of judges & mentors	Reality TV series to find a support act for to S Club 7 for their 2002 S Club 7 Carnival Tour
2002	Viva S Club	Acting as fictionalised versions of themselves	Sitcom; continuation of Miami 7, L.A. 7 and Hollywood 7 storylines. Titled S Club on screen in the US and referred to as S Club in Barcelona in usa

Film
Year	Title	Roles	Notes
1999	It's An S Club Thing	Themselves	Documentary, Produced by 19 Entertainment
2002	Don't Stop Movin'	Themselves	Documentary, Produced by 19 Entertainment for BBC
2003	Seeing Double	Acting as fictionalised versions of themselves	Musical comedy film; continuation of Miami 7 storyline

== Concert tours ==
- S Club Party Tour (2001)
- Carnival Tour (2002)
- S Club United Tour with S Club Juniors (2003)
- Bring It All Back 2015 (2015)
- The Good Times Tour (2023–2024)
- Ain't No Party Like an S Club Party Tour (2027)
