= Paul Cattermole =

English singer and actor (1977–2023)

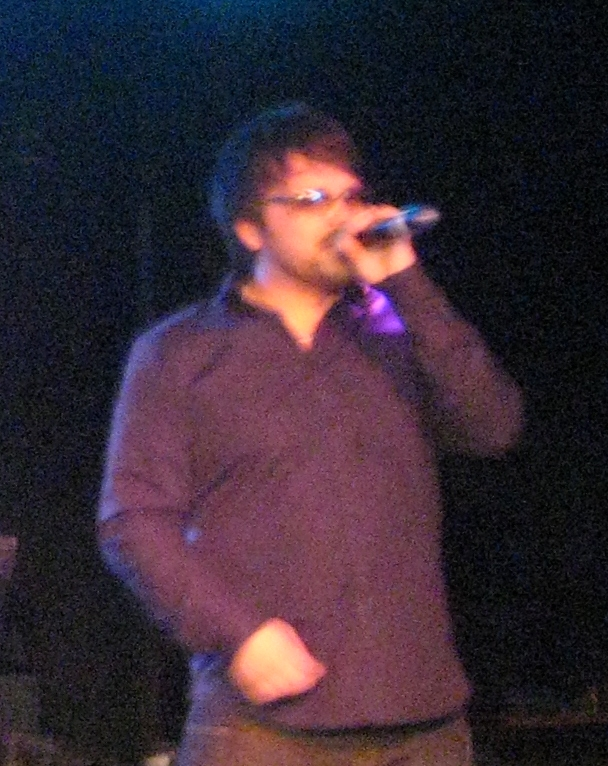
- Cattermole performing in 2010
- Born: Paul Gerald Cattermole; 7 March 1977; St Albans, Hertfordshire, England
- Died: 6 April 2023 (aged 46); Wareham, Dorset, England
- Occupations: Singer; actor
- Partner: Hannah Spearritt ( 2001–2006, 2015–2016)
- Musical career
- Genres: Pop; dance-pop
- Years active: 1993–2023
- Formerly of: S Club 7; S Club 3

Paul Gerald Cattermole (7 March 1977 – 6 April 2023) was an English singer and actor. He was a member of the pop group S Club 7 from 1998 until his departure in 2002. Cattermole returned to the line-up in 2014 for their reunion tour and was originally due to return in 2023 for a planned second reunion tour before his death.

== Early life ==
Paul Gerald Cattermole was born on 7 March 1977 in St Albans, Hertfordshire, to Gerald and Liz Cattermole. His grandfather worked at Abbey Road Studios in London, which gave the young Paul the idea of finding a job in music.

== Career ==
=== 1999–2002: Early career and joining S Club 7 ===
Cattermole's first big break was when he landed a part in a local performance of West Side Story. He later joined the National Youth Music Theatre, where he met his future S Club 7 bandmate Hannah Spearritt; they appeared together in Pendragon (1994). When he was 16, Cattermole decided to go in a different musical direction and formed a heavy metal band called Skua before Simon Fuller chose him to be in S Club 7.

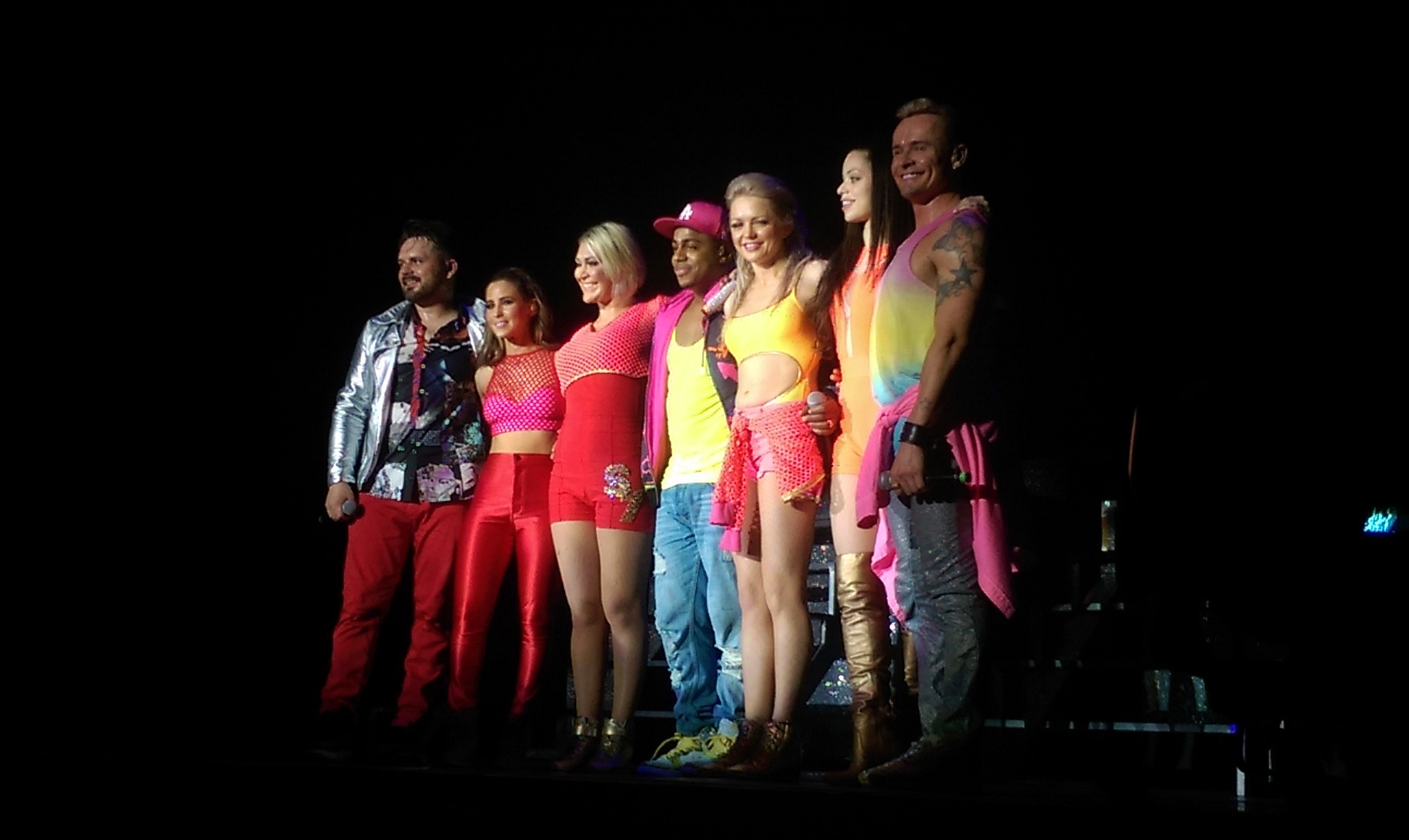
S Club 7 performing in 2015

Cattermole became a member of S Club 7 after a series of auditions, along with members Tina Barrett, Jon Lee, Bradley McIntosh, Jo O'Meara, Hannah Spearritt and Rachel Stevens in 1998. During five years they released four number-one singles and one number-one album. They also had a series of TV shows, which were: Miami 7, L.A. 7, Hollywood 7 and Viva S Club. Over the five years they were together, S Club 7 had four UK No.1 singles, one UK No.1 album, a string of hits throughout Europe, including a top-ten single in the United States, Asia, Latin America and Africa.

They recorded a total of four studio albums, released eleven singles and went on to sell over fourteen million albums worldwide. Their first album, S Club, had a strong 1990s pop sound, similar to many artists of their time. However, throughout the course of their career, their musical approach changed to a more dance and R&B sound. The concept and brand of the group was created by Simon Fuller, also their manager through 19 Entertainment; they were signed to Polydor Records. Their television series went on to last four series, seeing the group travel across the United States and eventually ending up in Barcelona, Spain. It became popular in 100 different countries where the show was watched by over 90 million viewers. As well as the popularity of their television series, S Club 7 won two Brit Awards.

In 2002, Cattermole left S Club 7 to rejoin his school metal band, Skua. He later described frustration with the S Club 7 management, and said that "it had got to the point where things were being handled so badly, I had to go". Cattermole stayed with S Club 7 until June 2002, featuring in four episodes of their final television series, Viva S Club. His final concert with the group was Party at the Palace, part of Queen Elizabeth II's Golden Jubilee celebrations. Skua failed to secure a record deal.

=== 2002–2008: Skua, hiatus and S Club 3 ===
In June 2002, Cattermole reunited with his old school friends and formed the nu metal band Skua—described as having a "Limp Bizkit vibe" as well as comparing their style to Rage Against the Machine. The band split in 2003, after they failed to sign with a record label and the number of shows was low.

After a five-year hiatus, it was announced in October 2008 that O'Meara, Cattermole, and McIntosh were to perform as S Club 3. The group consisted of a series of university and nightclub gigs, where they performed a set list consisting of a selection of songs from their Greatest Hits album. This had been performing in various nightclubs, universities and Butlin's holiday camps around the United Kingdom. Cattermole sang with his own band at a charity concert called 'The Sounds of Summer' at 'The Lord Taverners' club in London on 27 July 2011. Barrett joined the group for one performance in March 2014, and eventually replaced Paul fully from 2015.

=== 2014–2015: Skua return and S Club 7 reunion ===
In January 2014, Skua reformed. On 14 July the band released their first single, "Falling". On 20 July, they released another two singles, "Got Not Choice" and "Out Of Control". Their debut album, Kneel, was released on 14 October. Due to commitments with S Club 7's reunion, Skua found themselves lacking a frontman and the project halted having only released one album. The album was promoted only by the band themselves mainly via social media, with no record labels involved.

In October 2014, it was confirmed that the original lineup would reunite for the first time in over a decade for BBC Children in Need. S Club 7 announced their plans for an arena reunion tour, promptly entitled Bring It All Back 2015, which toured the UK in May 2015. After the S Club 7 full reunion tour, Cattermole decided to leave S Club 3 too.

=== 2015–2023: Final projects, First Dates Hotel, and second S Club 7 reunion ===
In 2015, Cattermole toured in a production of The Rocky Horror Show in the role of Eddie. He left the tour when he received a back injury after a dancer fell on him during a dance number.

In a 2018 interview with Loose Women Cattermole revealed that, since leaving The Rocky Horror Show cast, he was "working on odd jobs" to make ends meet, and that he had later found regular work as a station manager for a community radio station in Swanage. He also said that he had asked to participate in reality shows such as Celebrity Big Brother, Strictly Come Dancing and Dancing on Ice, but he was not invited to be a contestant.

In 2019, Cattermole appeared on an episode of First Dates Hotel. He was partnered with 27 year old singer, Anna, who told Cattermole that she'd “like to stay in touch, but not romantically.” Cattermole ended up getting visibly emotional and crying in front of the camera during his interview in the show.

In 2022, it was revealed that Cattermole had begun providing online tarot cards services.

On 10 February 2023, S Club's social media accounts stated that a major announcement would be made on The One Show on 13 February at 7 pm. Barrett, O'Meara and Stevens also made an appearance at the 2023 Brit Awards on 11 February, reminding viewers to tune in to find out what was happening.

On 13 February, the group revealed on The One Show that they were reuniting to go on tour for their 25th anniversary. The S Club 7 Reunited tour was set to begin at M&S Bank Arena in Liverpool on 13 October 2023 and culminate with a performance at The O2 Arena in London two weeks later. A second show at The O2 Arena on 27 October was added to the schedule following a huge demand for tickets during the pre-sale period. On 21 February, three additional dates were added due to overwhelming demand. Confirming their reunion tour they said, "We can't even believe it's been so long, music and friendship have always been at the core of everything that we've ever done."

Cattermole died on 6 April 2023. On 14 May 2023, S Club 7 announced that they had rebranded as S Club and that they would honour the tour, renamed the Good Times Tour as a tribute to Cattermole, as a five-piece, after member Spearitt had decided to leave the group.

== Personal life ==
=== Relationships and family ===
Cattermole and future S Club 7 bandmate Hannah Spearritt met as members of the National Youth Music Theatre in 1994. At the time, Cattermole was 17 years old and Spearritt was 13. They appeared together in Pendragon. In May 2001, the friendship between the two developed into a romantic relationship. They kept their relationship a secret for the first six months, waiting until November 2001 to make a public announcement. Their S Club colleagues were supportive of the relationship. Cattermole departed from the group in 2002 but the couple continued to date until early 2006. They later rekindled their romance for one final time in 2015; however, they parted ways again after a few months.

Cattermole lived in Swanage, Dorset, where his family was based.

=== Financial issues and bankruptcy ===
Cattermole had been declared bankrupt in 2014. In January 2018, he auctioned his Brit Award for Best British Breakthrough Act up on eBay, saying "there are bills to pay". The bidding eventually closed at £66,100, but the winning bidder failed to pay up. Cattermole also listed his 2002 Brit for "Don't Stop Movin'" (Best British Single), which hit the same figures, but was ultimately relisted and reportedly sold for £3,000. Cattermole said that half of the payments would go towards paying bills, but he was still deciding what to do with the other half.

In a February 2018 interview with Loose Women, Cattermole described the depth of his financial burden. The interview was criticised on social media by some viewers, who deemed it humiliating towards Cattermole.

== Death ==
On 6 April 2023, Cattermole was found unresponsive at his Dorset home and was pronounced dead later that day. He was 46 years old. The cause of death was later revealed as cardiac arrhythmia, acute myocardial ischemia and severe coronary artery atheroma and intraplaque haemorrhage.

Tributes came in from other groups of S Club 7's era, as well as from manager Simon Fuller.

On 26 July 2023, S Club, now down to five members after Spearitt's departure, released the single "These Are the Days" in memory of Cattermole. The accompanying music video, directed by Howard Greenhalgh, included video clips and photographs of Cattermole.

== Discography ==
- S Club (1999)
- 7 (2000)
- Sunshine (2001)

== Filmography ==
Television
Year	Title	Role	Notes	Ref
1999	Miami 7	Paul	Main role	
1999	Back to the '50s	Paul	Television film	
1999	Boyfriends & Birthdays	Paul	Television film	
1999	The Greatest Store in the World	Himself	Television film	
2000	L.A. 7	Paul	Main role	
2000	S Club 7 Go Wild!	Himself	Reality television	
2000	Artistic Differences	Paul	Television film	
2000	Christmas Special	Paul	Television film	
	Gonna Meet a Rockstar	Paul	Reality Television	
2001	Hollywood 7	Paul	Main role	
2001	S Club Search	Judge / Mentor	Reality television	
2002	Viva S Club	Paul	Main role, 5 episodes	
2018	Loose Women	Himself (Guest)	Series 22	
2019	First Dates	Participant	First Dates Hotel series	
2023	The One Show	Himself (Guest)	Final TV appearance	
