= Jo O'Meara =

English singer (born 1979)

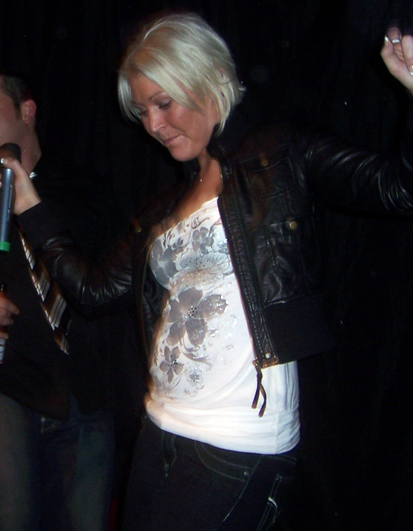
- O'Meara in 2008

Background information
- Born: Joanne Valda O'Meara; 29 April 1979 (age 47); Romford, London, England
- Genre: Pop
- Occupations: Singer; songwriter; television personality; actress
- Years active: 1996–present
- Labels: Sanctuary; Saga; Metrophonic
- Member of: S Club
- Formerly of: S Club Allstars; Solid HarmoniE; 2-4 Family
- Website: joomeara.uk

Joanne Valda O'Meara (born 29 April 1979) is an English singer and media personality. She was a member of the pop group S Club between 1999 and 2003, which has reformed since 2023. O'Meara was a contestant on the Channel 4 reality show Celebrity Big Brother in 2007, during which she was implicated in that season's racism controversy.

== Early life ==
Joanne Valda O'Meara was born in Romford, Greater London, to parents Dave and Barbara. She has a brother and sister, Shane and Julie. She grew up in Collier Row, a suburban housing estate in the north of Romford in the London Borough of Havering. She was educated at Clockhouse Junior School and Bower Park School. O'Meara was given a full scholarship to attend the Italia Conti Academy of Theatre Arts, where she excelled in music, acting and dance – receiving a standing ovation by the heads and principals for her rendition of the song "Summertime".

== Career ==
=== 1996–1998 ===
At age 16, O'Meara joined the earliest incarnation of girl group Solid HarmoniE and flew out to Sweden to work with record producer Max Martin. She'd move to Essex and performed open mic nights until she was spotted by the S Club 7 team in a country and western bar. Prior O'Meara was also a member of a German rap/hip hop group 2-4 Family which was formed in 1998.

=== 1998–2003: S Club ===
The group rose to public prominence by appearing in their own BBC television series, Miami 7, in 1999. Over the five years they were together, S Club 7 had four UK No.1 singles, one UK No.1 album, a string of hits throughout Europe, including a top-ten single in the United States, Asia, Latin America and Africa. They recorded a total of four studio albums, released eleven singles and went on to sell over fourteen million albums worldwide. Their first album, S Club, had a strong 1990s pop sound, similar to many artists of their time. However, through the course of their career, their musical approach changed to a more dance and R&B sound which is heard mostly in their final album, Seeing Double.

The concept and brand of the group was created by Simon Fuller, also their manager through 19 Entertainment; they were signed to Polydor Records. Their television series went on to last four series, seeing the group travel across the United States and eventually ending up in Barcelona, Spain. It became popular in 100 different countries where the show was watched by over 90 million viewers. The show, which was a children's sitcom, often mirrored real life events which had occurred in S Club, including the relationship of Hannah Spearritt and Paul Cattermole, as well as the latter's eventual departure from the group. As well as the popularity of their television series, S Club 7 won two Brit Awards—in 2000 for British breakthrough act and in 2002, for best British single. In 2001, the group earned the Record of Year. S Club's second last single reached number-five in the UK charts and their final studio album failed to make the top ten. However, on 21 April 2003, during a live onstage performance, S Club announced that they were to disband.

=== 2004–2007: Relentless and reality shows ===
In 2004, O'Meara signed with Simon Fuller as her artist manager and began recording her debut solo album, planned to be released between September and December. The album would be focused on R&B sound, with Fuller describing O'Meara as "the next Christina Aguilera". In December 2004, Fuller dropped O'Meara when they failed to sign with Polydor Records and had creative conflicts – he proposed that she record music from famous songwriters as Xenomania, but she wanted an authorial album. In 2005, O'Meara returned to studio as an independent artist to record a new material, focused on pop rock style and produced by Richard Carpenter, and recorded songs like "Taxi Cab", "Lovely" or "Don't Wanna Let You Down".

In July 2005, O'Meara signed with Sanctuary Records and on 26 September was released her debut solo single, "What Hurts the Most", a version of Mark Wills's 2003 song. The song peaked at number 13 on the United Kingdom and 26 in Ireland. On 3 October she released her debut album, Relentless; the album peaked at number 48 in UK and was described by music critics as "polished", "well constructed" and "better than other former boy/girl band" albums and O'Meara's Voice as "strong". In November, Sanctuary planned to release "Relentless" as the second single, but O'Meara decided to leave the label.

In February 2006, O'Meara took part in the BBC reality show Just the Two of Us. Her singing partner was Chris Fountain, actor on the Channel 4 soap opera Hollyoaks. The pair came third in the competition, failing to attract enough votes to make the final after their performance of "Never Had a Dream Come True". In January 2007, O'Meara appeared on Celebrity Big Brother. Along with Jade Goody and Danielle Lloyd, O'Meara was accused of racist and bullying behaviour toward fellow contestant Indian actress Shilpa Shetty, resulting in a record number of complaints to Ofcom, national and international media coverage, and condemnatory statements from the British and Indian governments.

=== 2008–2020: S Club 3 and S Club reunion ===
In November 2008, O'Meara, Bradley McIntosh, and Paul Cattermole formed the spin-off group S Club 3 and had been performing in nightclubs, universities and Butlins holiday camps around the United Kingdom. On 12 November 2008 a bottle was thrown during their performance in Bradford. It struck O'Meara, leaving her with a cut to the head requiring hospital treatment. A 20-year-old man was arrested and it was suggested the attack was linked to her Celebrity Big Brother appearance where she was accused of racially aggravated bullying.

O'Meara featured in a cover of the Python Lee Jackson song "In a Broken Dream" on the Popes' 2012 album New Church, her first released recording in seven years. She also appeared on stage with them performing the song. In November 2014, all seven original S Club 7 members reunited to perform a medley of some of their greatest hits on BBC Children In Need. They performed a reunion tour, Bring It All Back 2015, in May 2015.

Following the S Club reunion Jo continued to tour with Tina Barrett and Bradley McIntosh performing as S Club 3. In 2017, the trio released a single titled "Family" for charity but failed to chart in the UK.

In August 2020, O'Meara announced that she would no longer be performing as S Club 3 to focus on her upcoming second studio album. She was replaced by former S Club 8 member Stacey Franks, with the group renamed as "S Club Allstars".

=== 2021–present: Solo career return and second S Club reunion ===
In April and May 2021, O'Meara released unplugged renditions of "Don't Stop Movin'" and "Relentless," respectively. Those songs would go on to be included in her second album, With Love, was released on 27 August 2021, and featured twelve tracks.

In 2022, O'Meara signed a new management deal with Saga Entertainment with Jack Corbyn as her personal manager. This year also saw O'Meara taking to the stage at the London Palladium after releasing a cover of Radiohead classic "Creep".

In September 2022, O'Meara joined the Celebs to mark the 40th anniversary of the Michael Jackson classic album Thriller and raise money for Great Ormond Street Hospital, with a new rendition of the title track, which was released on the independent record label Saga Entertainment and produced by Grahame and Jack Corbyn.

On 13 February 2023, it was announced that S Club were to reunite for a second time for a new arena tour in October, to mark the 25th anniversary since their original formation. The tour would consist of 10 shows in the UK and one in Ireland, before moving on to Canada and the US in 2024.

== Personal life ==
In 2008, O'Meara gave birth to her son, after separating from her partner Bill Slate.

== Discography ==
=== Studio albums ===
List of albums, with selected chart positions, sales figures and certifications
Title	Album details	Peak chart positions	
Title	Album details	UK	SCO
Relentless	Released: 3 October 2005; Label: Sanctuary; Format: CD, digital download	48	56
With Love	Released: 27 August 2021; Label: Metrophonic; Format: Digital download	—	—
"—" denotes releases that did not chart or were not released in that territory.

=== Singles ===
List of singles, with selected chart positions
Title	Year	Peak chart positions			Album
Title	Year	UK	IRL	SCO	Album
"What Hurts the Most"	2005	13	26	11	Relentless
"On the Surface"	2021	—	—	—	With Love
"Sweet Surrender"	2021	—	—	—	With Love
"Missing You"	2021	—	—	—	With Love
"—" denotes releases that did not chart or were not released in that territory.

=== Promotional singles ===
Title	Year	Album
"Creep"	2022	Non-album singles
"Thriller"	2022	Non-album singles

== Filmography ==
=== Film ===
Year	Title	Role	Notes
2003	Seeing Double	Jo	Main role

=== Television ===
Year	Title	Role	Notes
1999	Miami 7	Jo	Main role
1999	Back to the '50s	Jo	Television film
1999	Boyfriends & Birthdays	Jo	Television film
1999	The Greatest Store in the World	Herself	Television film
2000	L.A. 7	Jo	Main role
2000	S Club 7 Go Wild!	Herself	
2000	Artistic Differences	Jo	Television film
2000	Christmas Special	Jo	Television film
2001	Hollywood 7	Jo	Main role
2001	S Club Search	Judge	
2002	Viva S Club	Jo	Main role
2006	Just the Two of Us	Contestant	Series 1
2007	Celebrity Big Brother	Contestant	Series 5
