= Boyfriends & Birthdays =

1999 British programme

- Genre: Sitcom; Family Entertainment
- Written by: Kim Fuller and Georgia Pritchett
- Directed by: Andrew Margeston
- Starring: S Club 7
- Opening theme: "Two in a Million"
- Country of origin: United Kingdom
- Original language: English
- No. of episodes: 1

Production
- Executive producer: Simon Fuller
- Production locations: Miami, Florida, United States
- Running time: 50 minutes (approx.)
- Production companies: 19 Entertainment; Steelhead Productions

Original release
- Network: CBBC (on BBC One)
- Release: 12 December 1999

Related
- Miami 7 Back to the '50s

Boyfriends & Birthdays is the second one-off programme from the British pop group S Club 7. It first aired on 12 December 1999 and was produced for CBBC. In this movie, the cast proceeds with their long drive from Miami to Los Angeles and Rachel receives an ultimatum from her English boyfriend to return home. She is then forced to choose between remaining in S Club 7 and losing her boyfriend or leaving the group to stay with him.

== Plot ==
Rachel is missing her boyfriend, and calls him from a telephone booth. He tells her that if she does not come back to England, their relationship is over. Rachel is left unsure about what course of action to take. The other members of the group decide to raise money for Rachel to return home by means of busking. They succeed in getting enough money for the trip and Rachel sets off to England, leaving S Club 7. However, she has a change of heart and returns, heartbroken, after deciding to remain in the group – but left reeling when her boyfriend dumps her over the phone.

Meanwhile, at Paradise Beach, the trailer park where they have stopped over for a few days on their journey through America, a poor family who has been stuck there for three years are hoping to get their car fixed – which is in such ruin that Jo initially cannot fix it, but she resolves to once Rachel has recouped the money from her unused fare for her return trip to England. The oldest of the children there, Jimmy Bob, is getting excited about his dad coming to see him on his birthday soon – only to get upset and run away when he is told he will not be able to come after all. The band split into groups to search for Jimmy Bob, with Rachel eventually finding him alone on the beach. She tells him that some people cannot understand that just because someone is not able to be there for them does not mean they do not want to.

A surprise birthday party for Jimmy Bob is held back at the trailer park and Jo unveils the fully restored car to the family, allowing Jimmy Bob to visit his father for his birthday. But before they then all head off again on their journey to Los Angeles, Jo has one last surprise for Rachel: a cute mechanic from whom Jo had gotten the spare parts for the car has stopped by to install the stoplights, and Rachel is instantly smitten with him. They talk for a while and Rachel is able to get over her ex-boyfriend by kissing the mechanic, vowing never to forget him.

== Cast ==
=== S Club 7 ===
- Tina Barrett
- Paul Cattermole
- Jon Lee
- Bradley McIntosh
- Jo O'Meara
- Hannah Spearritt
- Rachel Stevens

=== Guest stars ===
- Sage Schiathe as Rose-Marie
- Sara Pilgreen as Mary-Ann
- Tanner Perkins as Jimmy Bob
- Darian Weiss as Bobby-Joe
- Linset Baveta as Laurie-Beth
- Jay Johnson as Ethan
- Rick Perkins as Boy 1
- Alain Raymond as Boy 2

=== Trivia ===
- This is the first of two post-season S Club 7 specials in which Rachel almost leaves the group for romantic purposes. The second special is the post-L.A. 7 series, Artistic Differences, in which Rachel is smitten with a waiter she meets. He tells her that they are going off to Las Vegas to open a restaurant, but it turns out he is a con man who's already married and makes up stories like this to swoon girls.
