= S Club (album) =

Studio album by S Club 7
- Released: 4 October 1999
- Recorded: 1998–1999
- Studios: Stargate (Sandefjord, Norway); Steelworks (Sheffield, England)
- Genres: Pop; dance-pop; teen pop
- Length: 39:08
- Labels: Polydor; Interscope
- Producers: StarGate; Eliot Kennedy; Mike Percy; Tim Lever; Absolute; Angela Lupino; Simon Franglen; Tim Laws; Dufflebag Boys

S Club 7 chronology
S Club (1999)	7 (2000)

Singles from S Club
- 1. "Bring It All Back" Released: 7 June 1999; 2. "S Club Party" Released: 20 September 1999; 3. "Two in a Million" / "You're My Number One" Released: 13 December 1999

Professional ratings
Review scores
Source	Rating
AllMusic	3/5 stars

S Club is the debut studio album by British pop group S Club 7. It was released by Polydor Records on 4 October 1999. The album was primarily produced by StarGate, Absolute, Dufflebag Boys, Eliot Kennedy and Mike Percy.

S Club became one of the group's most successful album releases, and reached number two in the United Kingdom, where it was certified double platinum. S Club was released in North America on 11 April 2000 after their television show S Club 7 in Miami was aired in the United States, where it peaked outside the top 100. In Canada, the album charted within the top 10 and became the group's most successful album release on the Canadian albums chart.

== Background ==
S Club 7 first came to public attention in 1999, when they starred in their own television series, Miami 7. The show aired on CBBC on BBC One and was a children's sitcom based on the lives of the group who had moved to Miami, Florida in search of fame in America. The show was also launched in the United States, airing on Fox Family, and later on ABC Family; it was retitled S Club 7 in Miami for American audiences. The show eventually celebrated worldwide success and was watched by 90 million viewers in over 100 different countries. The group also filmed two specials between the first two series of their show. The first, Back to the '50s—which aired on CITV, instead of CBBC—told the story of how the group found themselves back in 1959. In the second TV special, Boyfriends & Birthdays, Stevens' boyfriend gave her an ultimatum of staying with him or remaining with the band.

Within the television series, and the parallel branding, each member of S Club 7 had their own character, which contained exaggerated forms of their real life counterparts as well as their own identifiable "S Club colour". Hannah Spearritt, for example, had an "S Club colour" of yellow which, as Spearritt describes, mirrors her own personality: "bright and happy". The show copied characterisations and format of the American series The Monkees; US media reported that S Club 7 were "The Monkees for the next generation". Joel Andryc, the vice president of the Fox Family Channel, stated that Miami 7 is "far more relationship driven" than The Monkees, and that "kids today are more sophisticated".

"Bring It All Back" (1999)
S Club 7's debut single and theme music to Miami 7.

Following on from Miami 7, S Club 7 released the theme music to the show as their debut single on 9 June 1999. The up-tempo "Bring It All Back" reached number-one on the UK Singles Chart, and after selling more than 600,000 copies, was certified Platinum by the BPI. Commenting on the chart position of "Bring It All Back", the group felt "nervous and on-edge" before they discovered they had reached number one. Once they had received the phone call from the record company, the band celebrated the news with "cheers, shouting and crying". The group's success escalated and much like Fuller's marketing campaign for the Spice Girls, they were set to become a "marketable commodity". As evidence for this, global toy manufacturer Hasbro agreed upon an exclusive licensing agreement with 19 Management, which included worldwide rights in the fashion doll category; singing S Club 7 dolls were later released onto the market. An official magazine, fan club, and accompanying Miami 7 scrapbook were also launched furthering 19 Management's corporate aim.

Over the course of the year, the group enjoyed more success in the charts after their second single, "S Club Party", entered the UK chart at number two and went straight to number-one in New Zealand. Their third single was a double A-side and featured the ballad "Two in a Million", co-written by Cathy Dennis, and retro-styled, up-tempo "You're My Number One". The former was the first single where O'Meara took lead vocals, setting the standard for future S Club 7 releases; the single also reached number two on the UK Singles Chart. Following the success of their television show and released singles, the group released their debut album S Club in October 1999. The album quickly rose to number two on the UK Albums Chart, and then became certified Double Platinum. The album consisted of a variety of styles including Motown and salsa tracks. Many non-single tracks, like "Friday Night" and "Everybody Wants Ya" became fan-favourites, with the latter also being featured in the soundtrack of Disney comedy series, Lizzie McGuire.

Due to the increasing demand for the group with gruelling schedules including spending over thirteen weeks in North America filming the first series of their show and their subsequent television specials, the members often felt that the travelling back and forth from the UK and the US was "perhaps more tiring than what we were actually going out to America to do". Paul Cattermole once commented that the speed of the schedule sometimes caused a "kind of dreamscape in your head", as the group often felt "jetlagged and tired". On top of the filming schedules, the group often performed at high-profile pop music festivals such as Party in the Park where they performed for 100,000 fans. The intensity of the schedule would be a constant battle for the group and was going to continue to take its toll for all the years S Club 7 were together. In spite of this, the group always remained in solidarity that they were all good friends, "cared for each other a lot" and supported each other through difficult times in the group.

== Track listing ==
S Club track listing
No.	Title	Writer(s)	Producer(s)	Length
1.	"Bring It All Back"	Eliot Kennedy; Tim Lever; Mike Percy; S Club 7	Kennedy; Lever; Percy; Andy Wright^{[a]}	3:33
2.	"You're My Number One"	Mike Rose; Nick Foster	Absolute	3:35
3.	"Two in a Million"	Cathy Dennis; Simon Ellis	Stargate	3:31
4.	"S Club Party"	Mikkel Storleer Eriksen; Tor Erik Hermansen; Hallgeir Rustan	Stargate; Jeremy Wheatley^{[a]}	3:30
5.	"Everybody Wants Ya"	Andy Watkins; Paul Wilson; Tracy Ackerman	Absolute	3:09
6.	"Viva La Fiesta"	Eriksen; Hermansen; Rustan; Dennis	Stargate	3:08
7.	"Gonna Change the World"	Simon Franglen; Angela Lupino	Franglen; Lupino	4:06
8.	"I Really Miss You"	Dennis; Kennedy; Patrick Lincoln	Kennedy; Lever; Percy	3:54
9.	"Friday Night"	Stephen Emmanuel; Tim Laws	Laws	3:49
10.	"It's a Feel Good Thing"	Rose; Foster; Kim Fuller	Dufflebag Boys	2:58
11.	"Hope for the Future"	Dennis; Danny Poku	Stargate	3:55

Japan bonus track
No.	Title	Writer(s)	Producer(s)	Length
12.	"So Right"	Dennis; Poku	Stargate	3:45

B-side songs
No.	Title	Writer(s)	Producer(s)	Length
13.	"Hello Friend"	Kennedy; Lever; Percy; S Club 7	Kennedy; Lever; Percy	3:01
14.	"Our Time Has Come"	Kennedy; Lever; Percy; S Club 7	Kennedy; Lever; Percy	4:21
15.	"We Can Work It Out"	Rose; Foster	Dufflebag Boys	3:11
16.	"Down At Club S"	Franglen; Lupino	Franglen; Lupino	4:03

Notes

- ^{^a} signifies an additional producer

== Charts ==
=== Weekly charts ===
Weekly chart performance for S Club
Chart (1999)	Peak position
European Albums (European Albums Chart)	13
New Zealand Albums (RMNZ)	2
Scottish Albums (Official Charts)	4
UK Albums (Official Charts)	2
Chart (2000)	Peak position
Australian Albums (ARIA)	17
Austrian Albums (Ö3 Austria)	25
Belgian Albums (Ultratop Wallonia)	25
Canada Top Albums/CDs (RPM)	10
Dutch Albums (Album Top 100)	41
Finnish Albums (Suomen virallinen lista)	30
French Albums (SNEP)	33
German Albums (Offizielle Top 100)	11
Hungarian Albums (MAHASZ)	4
Irish Albums (IRMA)	24
Swedish Albums (Sverigetopplistan)	17
Swiss Albums (Schweizer Hitparade)	10
US Billboard 200	112
Chart (2001)	Peak position
Norwegian Albums (VG-lista)	16

=== Year-end charts ===
Year-end chart performance for S Club
Chart (1999)	Position
New Zealand Albums (RMNZ)	37
UK Albums (OCC)	21
Chart (2000)	Position
Australian Albums (ARIA)	86
Canadian Albums (Nielsen SoundScan)	37
Swiss Albums (Schweizer Hitparade)	90
UK Albums (OCC)	51

== Certifications and sales ==
Certifications and sales for S Club
Region	Certification	Certified units/sales
Australia (ARIA)	Platinum	70,000^{^}
Canada (Music Canada)	2× Platinum	200,000^{^}
New Zealand (RMNZ)	3× Platinum	45,000^{^}
Singapore (RIAS)	Platinum	15,000
United Kingdom (BPI)	2× Platinum	736,008
United States	—	311,000
Summaries
Europe (IFPI)	Platinum	1,000,000^{*}
Worldwide	—	1,800,000
^{*} Sales figures based on certification alone.^{^} Shipments figures based on certification alone.
