= Bradley McIntosh =

British-Jamaican singer, rapper and actor

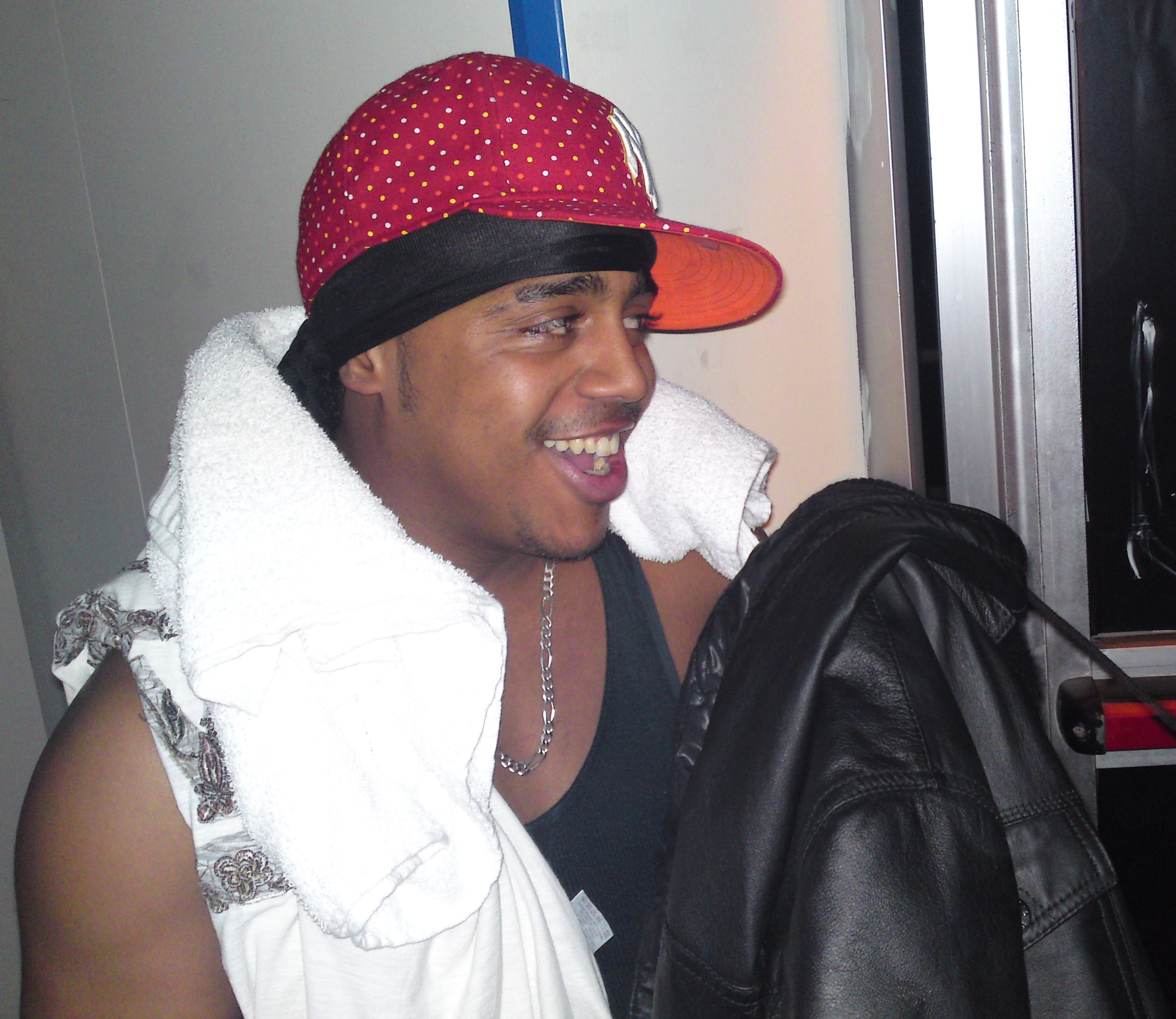
- McIntosh in 2009

Background information
- Also known as: City Boy; CitiBoy; City Boy Soul; Superfly 7
- Born: Bradley John McIntosh; 8 August 1981 (age 45); Lambeth, London, England
- Genres: Hip hop; R&B
- Occupations: Singer; rapper; songwriter; record producer; actor
- Years active: 1998–present

Bradley John McIntosh (born 8 August 1981), also known as City Boy, is an English-Jamaican singer, rapper, songwriter, actor and record producer. He is a member of the pop group S Club, where he enjoyed five years of hit singles, arena tours and awards. Since 2008, he has been a member of spin-off group S Club Allstars (previously "S Club 3") and has a solo career as rapper.

== Early life ==
Born in south London, McIntosh attended Greenshaw High School. He was born to Jamaican musical parents, Steve McIntosh and Lauraine (née Smart), who both achieved success with the Cool Notes.

== Career ==
=== 1998–2003: S Club ===
The group rose to fame by starring in their own BBC television series, Miami 7, in 1999. Over the five years they were together, S Club 7 had four UK No.1 singles, one UK No.1 album, a string of hits throughout Europe, including a top-ten single in the United States, Asia, Latin America, and Africa. They recorded a total of four studio albums, released eleven singles and went on to sell over fourteen million albums worldwide. Their first album, S Club, had a strong 1990s pop sound, similar to many artists of their time. Through the course of their career, their musical approach changed to a more dance and R&B sound, which is heard mostly in their final album, Seeing Double. S Club 7 won two Brit Awards – in 2000 for British breakthrough act and in 2002 for best British single. In 2001, the group earned the Record of the Year award. Group member Paul Cattermole departed from the group in 2002, and the group changed its name from S Club 7 to simply S Club. On 21 April 2003, during a live on-stage performance, S Club announced that they were to disband.

=== 2004–2007: Upper Street ===
Between 2004 and 2006 McIntosh tried to sign with some labels as solo artist, but failed. In 2006, he starred in an MTV reality show called Totally Boyband. Other people starring were members of disbanded groups. He became part of a boyband, Upper Street, made up of ex-members of 911, Steps, Another Level and New Kids on the Block. They released the single "The One" on 23 October 2006, but it was not a commercial success, reaching #35 on the UK Singles Chart and the band had split up after confrontation with their record company. Also in 2006, McIntosh was a competitor in Sport Relief, boxing against Jack Osbourne.

=== 2008–present: Solo career and S Club Allstars ===
In 2008, McIntosh and S Club 7 members Jo O'Meara and Paul Cattermole formed the S Club Allstars (previously "S Club 3") and performed in various nightclubs and universities in the United Kingdom and Australia. As City Boy Soul McIntosh released his debut solo single "No Regrets (Who We Are)" in 2010, as well as "Be OK" featuring Mutya Buena from Sugababes. He also uploaded several songs to his SoundCloud and Youtube account, the latter as Citi Boy, but no new single was officially released. In 2014, S Club 7 announced their plans for an arena reunion tour, promptly entitled Bring It All Back 2015, which toured the UK in May 2015.

After the full group reunion, McIntosh, O'Meara and Tina Barrett – replacing Cattermole – continued as "S Club 3". When O'Meara left in 2020, she was replaced the following year by S Club 8 original member Stacey Franks, and the group was renamed "S Club Allstars".

== Discography ==
=== Singles ===
==== As main artist ====
Song	Year	Album
"No Regrets (Who We Are)" (featuring Gak Jonze)	2010	Non-album singles

==== As featured artist ====
Song	Year	Album
"The Bangle" (Remix) (Taj E featuring Bradley McIntosh, Juggy D, Horizon & Y-Dre)	2009	Sik N Twisted
"Come See Me Tonight" (Mr Murdz featuring City Boy)	2010	Non-album singles
"Rock Boi" (Gak Jonze featuring City Boy)	2011	Non-album singles
"Hands Up" (Robbie Glover featuring Bradley McIntosh)	2013	Non-album singles
"You're Never Too Young" (The Cool Notes featuring Citiboy)	2021	Non-album singles

=== Production work ===
Song	Year	Artist(s)	Album
"Keep Smiling"	2009	Bars and Melody	143
143	2009	Bars and Melody	143

== Filmography ==
Film
Year	Title	Role	Notes
2003	Seeing Double	Bradley	Main role

Television
Year	Title	Role	Notes
1999	Miami 7	Bradley	Main Role
1999	Back to the '50s	Bradley	Television film
1999	Boyfriends & Birthdays	Bradley	Television film
1999	The Greatest Store in the World	Himself	Television film
2000	L.A. 7	Bradley	Main Role
2000	S Club 7 Go Wild!	Himself	Reality television
2000	Artistic Differences	Bradley	Television film
2000	Christmas Special	Bradley	Television film
2001	Hollywood 7	Bradley	Main role
2001	S Club Search	Judge / Mentor	Reality television
2002	Viva S Club	Bradley	Main role
2006	Just the Two of Us	Guest judge	Episode: "3 March 2006"
2006	Totally Boyband	Himself	Reality television
2006	Sport Relief	Contestant	Season 3
