= Hannah Spearritt =

English singer and actress (born 1981)

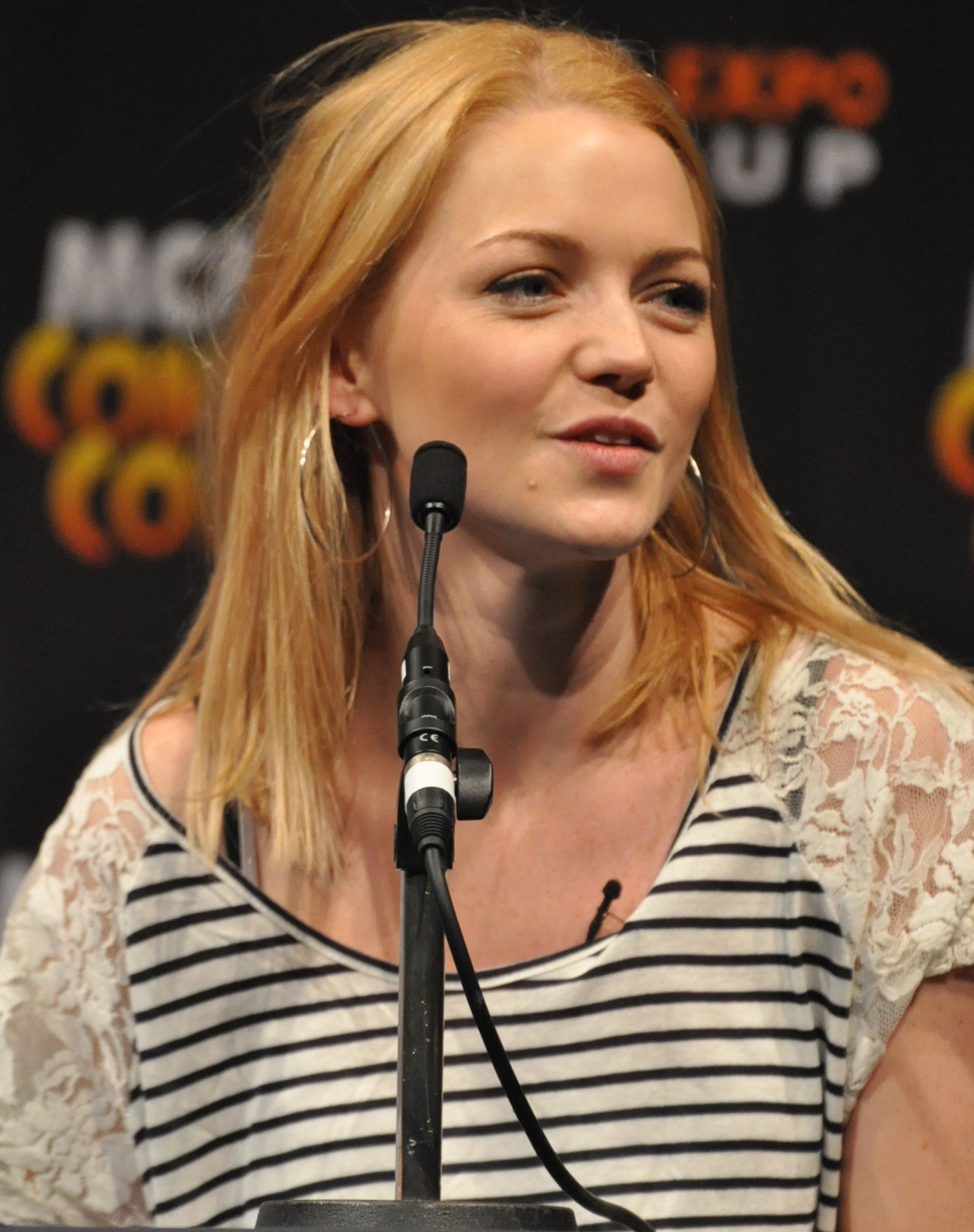
- Spearritt in 2013
- Born: Hannah Louise Spearritt; 1 April 1981 (age 45); Great Yarmouth, Norfolk, England
- Occupations: Singer; actress
- Years active: 1994–present
- Children: 2
- Relatives: Eddie Spearritt (uncle)

Hannah Louise Spearritt (born 1 April 1981) is an English singer and actress. She is an original member of the pop group S Club. Spearritt is known for playing the role of Abby Maitland in the British science-fiction drama Primeval (2007–2011), Mercedes Christie in Casualty (2016) and Kandice Taylor in EastEnders (2017–2018).

== Career ==
=== 1994–1998: Stage ===
When she was 12, Spearritt landed a part in the Lowestoft Players amateur dramatics society's production of Annie. Thereafter, she successfully auditioned for the National Youth Music Theatre, and became part of the company. (1994–1995), Tin Pan Ali (1996), and the West End musical Bugsy Malone (1997). In 1998, she was cast in the television film The Cater Street Hangman, playing the role of a maid who gets murdered. Spearritt also made appearances on the National Lottery and Blue Peter.

=== 1999–2023: S Club ===
In 1998, Spearritt auditioned for and became a member of S Club. In the five years they were together, the group had four UK number one singles and a UK number one album. They recorded a total of four studio albums, released eleven singles and went on to sell over fourteen million albums worldwide. Their first album, S Club, had a strong 1990s pop sound, similar to many artists of their time. However, through the course of their career, their musical approach changed to a more dance and R&B sound which is heard mostly in their final album, Seeing Double. Spearritt led some of the tracks on the groups' albums, such as "Dance Dance Dance" and "Hey Kitty Kitty", the latter which was also a promotional single for Sunny Delight. S Club 7 won two BRIT Awards—in 2000 for British breakthrough act and in 2002, for Best British Single. In 2001, the group earned the Record of the Year award. On 21 April 2003, during a live onstage performance, S Club announced that they were to disband.

On 14 November 2014, S Club reunited for a BBC Children in Need telethon, performing a medley of "S Club Party", "Reach", "Bring It All Back" and "Don't Stop Movin'". On 28 April 2015, S Club 7 reissued Best: The Greatest Hits of S Club 7, with a previously unreleased song, "Rain", as well as "Friday Night" from the S Club album. In May, S Club 7 performed in UK arenas on the Bring It All Back 2015 tour. In February 2023, it was announced the group would reform for a second time. In April, a few weeks after the announcement, Paul Cattermole unexpectedly died. In May, the group confirmed they would be carrying on but Spearritt would not be joining them following Cattermole's death.

=== 2003–present: Acting and television ===
In 2003, she was in Los Angeles to audition for a role in the film Agent Cody Banks 2: Destination London, a fact that she revealed at the UK premiere of the film on 24 March 2004 in London. In 2004, Spearritt appeared in horror film Seed of Chucky. In 2005, she appeared in the BBC series Blessed as Sarah. In December 2005, Spearritt appeared in the West End musical Snow! The Musical, at London's Sound Theatre.

In 2006, it was revealed that Spearritt had landed a lead role in the ITV series Primeval. She portrayed the role of Abby Maitland, a reptile enthusiast who gets mixed up with time travelling Professor Nick Cutter (Douglas Henshall) after discovering a species of reptile she had never encountered. Later that year, she made an appearance in Agatha Christie's Marple. In March 2012, Spearritt took over the role of Pauline in One Man, Two Guvnors at the Theatre Royal Haymarket. In December 2015, it was confirmed that Spearritt would star as Mercedes Christie in the BBC medical drama Casualty. Spearritt made her debut on 23 January 2016. In 2017, Spearritt joined the cast of EastEnders as Kandice Taylor, the sister of Karen Taylor (Lorraine Stanley), leaving the show when she became pregnant. In 2024, Spearritt appeared as a contestant on the sixteenth series of Dancing on Ice. She was paired with Andy Buchanan and was second to be eliminated.

In July 2025, Spearritt was named in the line-up of Celebrity: SAS Who Dares Wins.

== Personal life ==
Spearritt and Paul Cattermole met in 1994 when both were members of the National Youth Music Theatre. In 1999, Spearritt and Cattermole became members of S Club 7. They dated from 2001 until 2006. In 2006 Spearritt started dating Andrew-Lee Potts, her co-star on the series Primeval; the couple were engaged from 2008 until 2013.

On 20 December 2018, it was announced that Spearritt had given birth to a baby girl. In December 2020, Spearritt announced the birth of her second daughter, both with her then-partner Adam Thomas.

Spearritt is the niece of Eddie Spearritt, who played professional football in the then-top level of the English football league system.

== Stage ==
Year	Title	Role
1994–1995	Pendragon	Lana
1996	Tin Pan Ali	Annie
1997–1998	Bugsy Malone	
2011	The Belle's Stratagem	Lady Frances
2012–2014	One Man, Two Guvnors	Pauline
2015–2016	The Armour	Poppy Jean
2019	A Cinderella Christmas	Fairy Godmother

== Filmography ==
=== Film ===
Year	Title	Role	Notes
2003	Seeing Double	Hannah	Main role
2004	Agent Cody Banks 2: Destination London	Emily Sommers	
2004	Seed of Chucky	Joan	
2014	The Goob	Mary Ellen	
2015	GoryTime	Hayley Smith	
2015	Utopia	Lucy	
2018	I, Dog	Natalie Bedwyn	

=== Television ===
Year	Title	Role	Notes
1998	The Cater Street Hangman	Lily	Television film
1999	Miami 7	Hannah	Main Role
1999	Back to the '50s	Hannah	Television film
1999	Boyfriends & Birthdays	Hannah	Television film
1999	The Greatest Store in the World	Herself	Television film
2000	L.A. 7	Hannah	Main Role
2000	S Club 7 Go Wild!	Herself	Reality television
2000	Artistic Differences	Hannah	Television film
2000	Christmas Special	Hannah	Television film
2001	Hollywood 7	Hannah	Main role
2001	S Club Search	Judge / Mentor	Reality television
2002	Viva S Club	Hannah	Main role
2005	Blessed	Sarah	Main role
2007	Agatha Christie's Marple	Tilly Rice	Episode: "At Bertram's Hotel"
2007–2011	Primeval	Abby Maitland	Main role
2013	Death in Paradise	Lily Shaw	Episode: "A Dash of Sunshine"
2016	Casualty	Mercedes Christie	Recurring role
2017–2018	EastEnders	Kandice Taylor	Recurring role
2024	Dancing on Ice	Herself	Contestant; series 16
2025	Celebrity SAS Who Dares Wins	Herself	Contestant; Series 7

=== Video games ===
Year	Title	Role	Notes
2010	Primeval Evolved	Abby Maitland	Voice role

== Awards and nominations ==
Year	Award	Category	Work	Result	Ref.
2007	TV Quick & TV Choice Awards	Best Actress	Primeval	Nominated	
