= Jon Lee (actor) =

British actor and singer

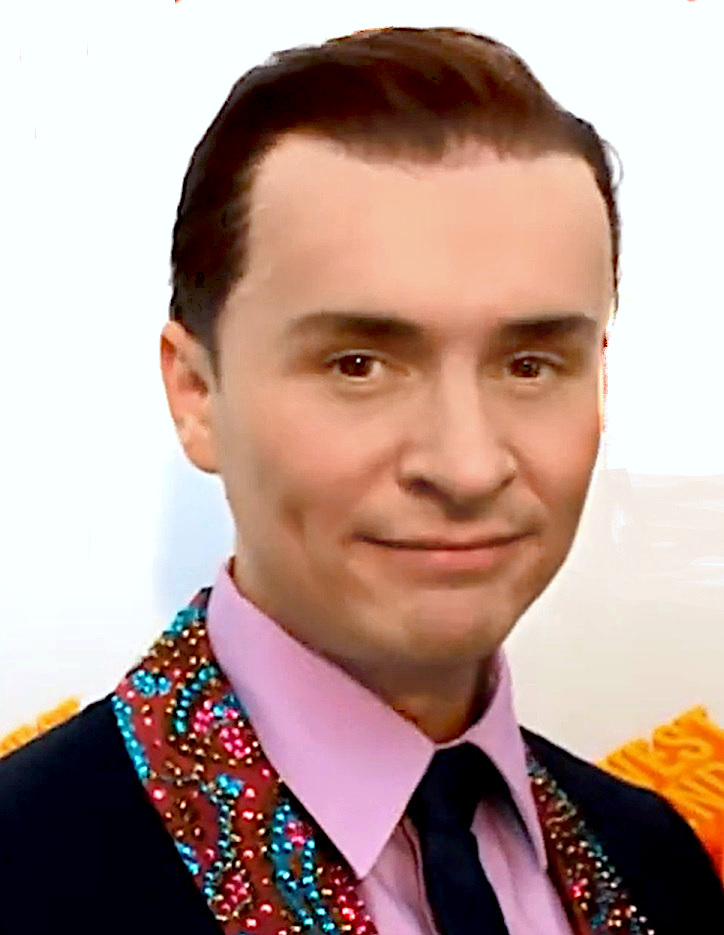
- Lee in 2013

Background information
- Born: Jonathan Lee; 26 April 1982 (age 44); Croydon, London, England
- Occupations: Singer; actor
- Years active: 1994–present
- Member of: S Club

Jonathan Lee (born 26 April 1982) is an English singer and actor. Lee is the youngest member of pop group S Club, which disbanded in April 2003, before reuniting in March 2023. With a long career in musical theatre, he has taken on roles in more than 17 productions, including the West End shows Les Misérables and Jersey Boys.

== Early life ==
Lee was born in Croydon, London, England. Lee grew up in south Devon and attended Decoy Primary in Newton Abbot, but the family moved to the village of Ipplepen when he was seven. Although he did not attend a theatre school, Lee was "always doing plays". He joined a drama club and later did amateur dramatics. He moved up to Coombeshead College, a comprehensive school in Newton Abbot, where arts and drama were encouraged. The school had a drama wing with a dance studio and also a recording studio.

At the age of 13, Lee won a scholarship to the Sylvia Young Theatre School in central London, a private school with about 150 pupils.

== Career ==
=== 1994–1998: stage ===
While still aged 11 Lee auditioned for the West End production of Oliver! and got the part just after turning 12. While still 13, Lee played the leading role in the West End production of Oliver! at the London Palladium Theatre, alongside Jonathan Pryce, and later George Layton, as Fagin. In 1997, Lee played the role of Julian in the premiere of The Famous Five – Smuggler's Gold – The Musical.

=== 1999–2003: S Club ===
Lee was a member of pop group S Club 7, who rose to fame by starring in their own BBC television series, Miami 7, in 1999. Over the five years they were together, they had four UK No.1 singles, one UK No.1 album, hits throughout Europe, and a top-ten single in the United States, Asia, Latin America and Africa. They recorded four studio albums, released eleven singles and sold over fourteen million albums worldwide. In 2001 the group earned the Record of the Year award. Group member Paul Cattermole departed the group in 2002, and the group changed its name from S Club 7 to simply S Club. On 21 April 2003, during a live onstage performance, S Club announced that they were to disband.

=== 2004–present: Acting ===
In 2004 Lee played the role of Marius in Les Misérables at the Palace Theatre in London, and continued the role following the show's move to the smaller Queen's Theatre. In 2005 Lee toured the UK with the new musical, Love Shack, featuring disco classics and hit dance songs from the charts, starring alongside Steps' Faye Tozer and Hear'Say's Noel Sullivan. In August 2006 Lee starred in The Heather Brothers' production of Teen Scream at the Assembly Rooms at the Edinburgh Festival Fringe. He returned to the London stage in 2010 in the musical Tomorrow Morning. Lee worked on a number of other musical projects before returning to the stage, including BBC's "The Sound of Musicals". In 2008 he recorded a song for the CD Act One – Songs From The Musicals Of Alexander S. Bermange, an album of 20 new recordings by 26 West End stars. It was released in November 2008 on Dress Circle Records.

In 2008 Lee voiced the part of Max, in the British Disney Channel cartoon series Famous 5: On the Case. Over Christmas and New Year's 2008–09 he appeared at The White Rock Theatre, Hastings, performing the leading role in the pantomime Peter Pan. Both Lee and the show were well received. Later in 2009 Lee appeared as Billy Fury in Nick Moran's new film Telstar. On 22 May 2010 he appeared in BBC One's Casualty as Craig, who is diagnosed with motor neurone disease. He played John in the internationally acclaimed musical Tomorrow Morning by Laurence Mark Wythe at the Landor Theatre in London. Over the following Christmas and New Year's, Lee appeared at the New Victoria Theatre, Woking, as Prince Charming in Cinderella.

In October 2012 Lee announced his debut solo album, Fallen Angel. The first track on the album, "My Father's Son", was premiered on 4 November by BBC Radio 2's Paul O'Grady. The album was released on 4 March 2013. Lee took on the part of Frankie Valli in Jersey Boys at the Prince Edward Theatre, London, from 15 March 2011 until 7 March 2014. At the end of 2012, while maintaining his Jersey Boys commitments, Lee took the lead role in Aladdin at The O2 in London and acted alongside O'Grady, who revived his alter-ego Lily Savage.

In August 2016, Lee appeared at the Lytham Festival's West End Proms. In March 2017, Lee appeared on Let's Sing and Dance for Comic Relief as part of Boys Allowed with Gareth Gates, Duncan James, Ritchie Neville and Ben Ofoedu. In March 2018, he appeared on ITV's Dinner Date. In 2026, Lee reprised the role of Josh Saunders on EastEnders.

== Personal life ==
In August 2010, Lee revealed that he is gay in an interview with Gay Times magazine. He added that he had come out to family and friends at a young age, and that "it's never needed to be a huge change that I've had to tell everyone about."

== Filmography ==
=== Film ===
Year	Title	Role	Notes
2003	Seeing Double	Jon	Main role
2008	Telstar: The Joe Meek Story	Billy Fury	

=== Television ===
Year	Title	Role	Notes
1993	Swamp Thing	Robert Niedman	Episode: "Patient Zero"
1995	Law & Order	Robert	Episode: "Angel"
1997–98, 2026	EastEnders	Josh Saunders	Main role
1997	The Mill on the Floss	Tom (Young)	Television film
1999	Miami 7	Jon	Main Role
1999	Back to the '50s	Jon	Television film
1999	Boyfriends & Birthdays	Jon	Television film
1999	The Greatest Store in the World	Himself	Television film
2000	L.A. 7	Jon	Main Role
2000	S Club 7 Go Wild!	Himself	Reality television
2000	Artistic Differences	Jon	Television film
2000	Christmas Special	Jon	Television film
2001	Hollywood 7	Jon	Main role
2001	S Club Search	Judge / Mentor	Reality television
2002	Viva S Club	Jon	Main role
2006	The Sound of Musicals	Various roles	
2008	Famous 5: On the Case	Max (voice)	Main role
2010	Casualty	Craig Robbins	Episode: "Mum's the Word"
2018	Celebrity Dinner Date	Contestant	Episode: "3"

== Stage ==
Year	Title	Role	Location
1994–1995	Oliver!	Oliver Twist	London Palladium, West End
1997	The Famous Five: Smuggler's Gold	Julian	UK National Tour
2003–04	Les Misérables	Marius Pontmercy	Queen's Theatre, West End
2004–2005	Love Shack	Evan	Milton Keynes Theatre, Milton Keynes
2005–06	Les Misérables	Marius Pontmercy	Queen's Theatre, West End
2006	The Sound of Musicals	(various)	UK National Tour
2006–2007	Teen Scream	Joe	Assembly Rooms, Edinburgh
2008–2009	Peter Pan	Peter Pan	White Rock Theatre, Hastings
2010	Tomorrow Morning	John	Landor Theatre, Off-West End
2010	Cinderella	Prince Charming	New Victoria Theatre, Woking
2010	Les Misérables in Concert: The 25th Anniversary	Sailor	The O2 Arena, London
2011–2014	Jersey Boys	Frankie Valli	Prince Edward Theatre, West End
2012	Aladdin: A Wish Come True	Aladdin	O2 Arena, London
2014	Copacabana	Tony Starr	UK National Tour
2016	Forever Plaid	Jinx	St James Theatre, Off-West End
2016–2017	Peter Pan	Peter Pan	Alhambra Theatre, Bradford
2017–2018	West End Proms	Jon	Royal Albert Hall, London

== Discography ==
=== Albums ===
List of albums
Title	Album details
Fallen Angel	Released: 4 March 2013; Format: CD, digital download; Label: MaKiNG Records

=== Singles ===
Song	Year	Album
"My Father's Son"	2013	Fallen Angel
