= S Club 7 discography =

S Club discography
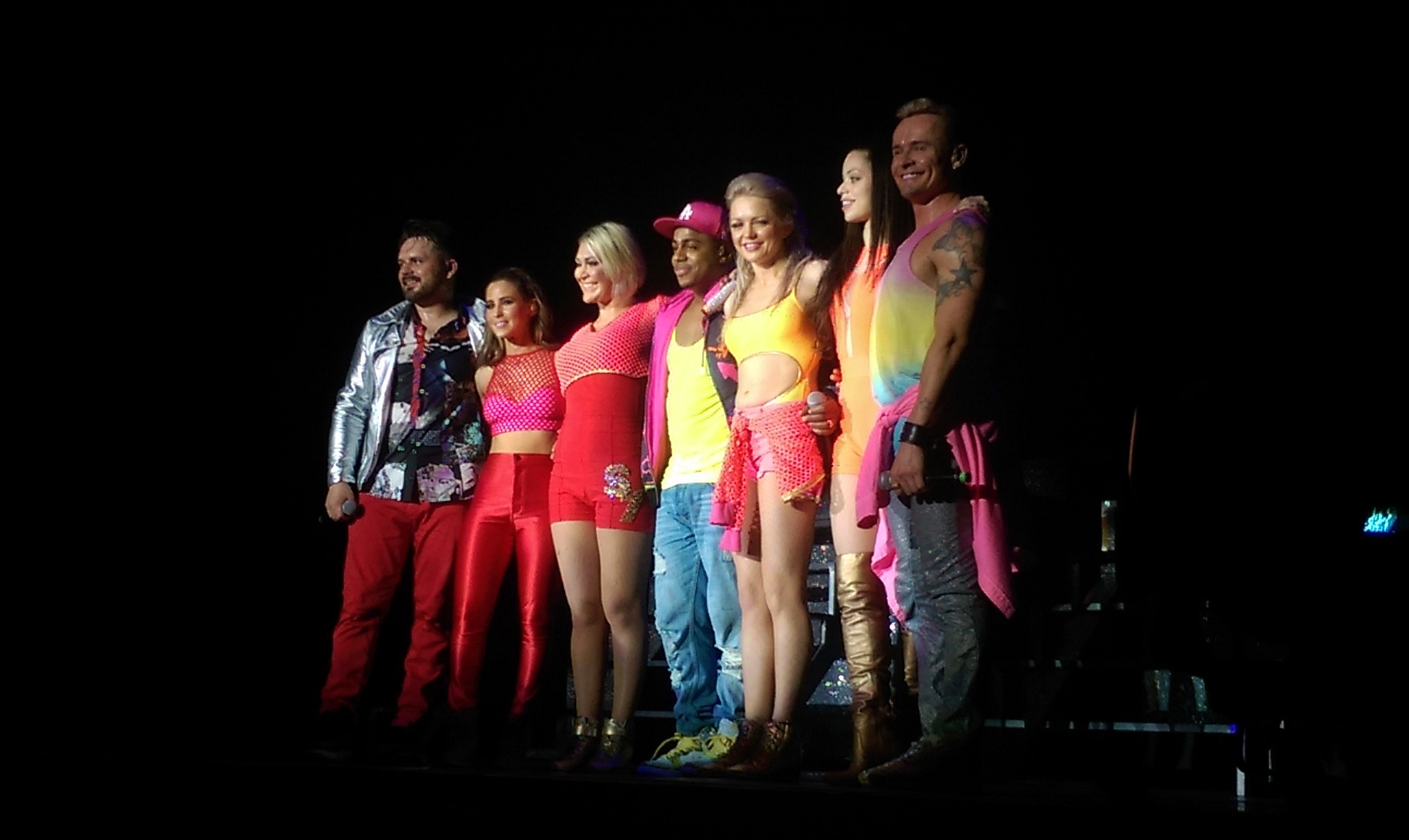
- Studio albums: 4
- Compilation albums: 3
- Singles: 14
- Video albums: 5
- Music videos: 14
- Promotional singles: 4

This is the discography of British pop group S Club. The group went on to release 14 singles, 4 studio albums and 3 compilation albums throughout their career. The group formed in 1998 and rose to prominence starring in their own musical-comedy BBC television series, Miami 7 (1999); in North America, the show was titled S Club 7 in Miami and ran for four seasons on Nickelodeon and Fox Family. The show is widely thought to have inspired a generation of teenage TV musicals, including High School Musical and Glee. Over the five years they were together, S Club had four UK number-one singles, one UK number-one album, a string of hits throughout Europe, including a top ten single in the United States, Asia, Latin America, and Africa, and went on to sell over 10 million albums worldwide. Their first album, S Club, had a strong 1990s pop sound, similar to many artists of their time. However, through the course of their career, their musical approach changed to a more dance and R&B sound which is heard mostly in their final album, Seeing Double.

The concept and branding of the original S Club 7 is credited to Simon Fuller—the man who auditioned the Spice Girls—who was their manager through 19 Entertainment. S Club were signed to Polydor Records, and won two BRIT Awards (2000) for British Breakthrough Act and for Best British Single (2002). In 2001, the group earned the Record of the Year award. Group member Paul Cattermole departed the group in 2002, citing "creative differences", and the group changed its name from S Club 7 to simply S Club. Their second to last single reached number-five on the UK charts, but their final studio album failed to make the top ten. After Cattermole's departure, the group fought-against many rumours presuming that they were about to split. However, on 21 April 2003, during a live onstage performance, S Club announced that they were intending to disband.

On 26 July 2023, for the first time in 20 years, S Club released new material in the form of a single, titled "These Are the Days", in memory of Cattermole—who unexpectedly died in April 2023.

== Albums ==
=== Studio albums ===
List of studio albums, with selected chart positions and certifications
Title	Album details	Peak chart positions										Certifications
Title	Album details	UK	AUS	BEL	FRA	GER	IRE	NZ	SWE	SWI	US	Certifications
S Club	Released: 4 October 1999; Label: Polydor; Formats: CD, cassette, digital download, streaming, LP	2	17	25	33	11	24	2	17	10	112	BPI: 2× Platinum; ARIA: Platinum; IFPI EUR: Platinum; MC: 2× Platinum; RMNZ: 3× Platinum
7	Released: 12 June 2000; Label: Polydor; Formats: CD, cassette, digital download, streaming, LP	1	56	49	69	25	10	15	42	27	69	BPI: 4× Platinum; IFPI EUR: Platinum; MC: Platinum; RIAA: Gold; RMNZ: Gold
Sunshine	Released: 26 November 2001; Label: Polydor; Formats: CD, cassette, digital download, streaming, LP	3	62	—	112	36	11	13	38	57	—	BPI: 3× Platinum; MC: Gold; RMNZ: Gold
Seeing Double	Released: 25 November 2002; Label: Polydor; Formats: CD, cassette, digital download, streaming	17	—	—	—	—	70	—	—	—	—	BPI: Gold
"—" denotes releases that did not chart or were not released in that territory.

=== Compilation albums ===
List of studio albums, with selected chart positions and certifications
Title	Album details	Peak chart positions		Certifications
Title	Album details	UK	IRE	Certifications
Don't Stop Movin'	Released: 17 December 2002 (US only); Label: Interscope; Formats: CD, streaming	—N/a		
Best: The Greatest Hits of S Club 7	Released: 2 June 2003; Reissued: 4 May 2015; Label: Polydor; Formats: CD, cassette, VHS, DVD, digital download, streaming, LP	2	22	BPI: Platinum
Essential S Club 7	Released: 9 July 2021; Label: Spectrum; Formats: 3×CD	35	—	
Don't Stop Movin' Megamix	Released: 3 November 2023; Label: S Club Entertainment; Formats: Digital download, streaming	—	—	
"—" denotes releases that did not chart or were not released in that territory.

=== Video albums ===
Title	Album details	Certifications
It's An S Club Thing	Released: 22 November 1999; Label: Polydor; Formats: VHS	BPI: Platinum
S Club Party Live	Released: 17 December 2001; Label: Polydor; Formats: VHS, DVD	BPI: 3× Platinum
Don't Stop Movin'	Released: 25 November 2002; Label: Polydor; Formats: DVD	
Carnival	Released: 25 November 2002; Label: Polydor; Formats: VHS, DVD	BPI: Gold
Dance the S Club Way	Released: 28 April 2003; Label: Polydor; Formats: VHS, DVD	
Best: The Greatest Hits of S Club 7	Released: 2 June 2003; Label: Polydor; Formats: VHS, DVD	

== Singles ==
=== As lead artist ===
List of singles, with selected chart positions and certifications
Title	Year	Peak chart positions										Certifications	Album
Title	Year	UK	AUS	BEL	FRA	GER	IRE	NZ	SWE	SWI	US	Certifications	Album
"Bring It All Back"	1999	1	3	5	21	6	3	1	9	2	—	BPI: 2× Platinum; ARIA: Platinum; BEA: Gold; IFPI SWE: Gold; RMNZ: Platinum	S Club
"S Club Party"	1999	2	2	19	45	78	9	1	—	39	—	BPI: Gold; ARIA: Platinum; RMNZ: Gold	S Club
"Two in a Million"	1999	2	25	—	—	—	8	1	—	95	—	BPI: Silver	S Club
"You're My Number One"	1999	2	—	—	—	—	8	—	—	—	—	BPI: Silver	S Club
"Reach"	2000	2	38	—	—	62	8	28	42	30	—	BPI: 2× Platinum	7
"Natural"	2000	3	45	52	67	42	17	—	—	64	—		7
"Never Had a Dream Come True"	2000	1	—	—	—	—	2	31	10	—	10	BPI: Platinum; IFPI SWE: Gold	7
"Don't Stop Movin'"	2001	1	2	43	20	9	1	3	4	1	—	BPI: 2× Platinum; ARIA: 2× Platinum; IFPI SWE: Gold	Sunshine
"Have You Ever"	2001	1	49	58	—	37	4	20	21	40	—	BPI: Gold	Sunshine
"You"	2002	2	71	—	—	—	6	—	—	—	—		Sunshine
"Alive"	2002	5	30	—	—	74	11	—	—	98	—		Seeing Double
"Say Goodbye"	2003	2	75	—	—	84	6	—	—	—	—		Best: The Greatest Hits of S Club 7
"Love Ain't Gonna Wait for You"	2003	2	75	—	—	—	—	—	—	—	—		Best: The Greatest Hits of S Club 7
"These Are the Days"	2023	— (Note: "These Are the Days" did not enter the UK Top 100 Singles Chart, but instead debuted and peaked at number 15 on the UK Singles Downloads Chart Top 100 on 28 July 2023.)	—	—	—	—	—	—	—	—	—		Non-album single
"—" denotes releases that did not chart or were not released in that territory.

=== As featured artist ===
Single	Year	Peak chart positions		Album
Single	Year	UK	SWI	Album
"It's Only Rock 'n Roll (But I Like It)" (among Artists for Children's Promise)	1999	19	92	Non-album single

=== Promotional singles ===
Title	Year	Album
"Perfect Christmas"	2000	Platinum Christmas
"Bring the House Down"	2001	7
"Stronger"	2001	Sunshine
"Dance"	2002	Seeing Double
"Hey Kitty Kitty"	2002	Seeing Double
"Good Times" (Bradley & Jon)	2024	Non-album single

== Other appearances ==
Title	Year	Album
"Dancing Queen"	1999	ABBAmania
"The Two of Us"	1999	Stuart Little
"Lately"	2000	Motown Mania; 7 (UK re-release)
"Move It" (with Cliff Richard and Brian May)	2002	Party at the Palace
"Can You Feel the Love Tonight"	2002	Disneymania
"Family" (as SC3 (S Club 3))	2017	Non-album single

== Music videos ==
Title	Year	Director
"Bring It All Back"	1999	Andrew Margetson
"S Club Party"	1999	Andrew Margetson
"Two in a Million"	1999	Andrew Margetson
"You're My Number One"	1999	Andrew Margetson
"Reach"	2000	Carter Smith
"Natural"	2000	Andy Morahan
"Never Had a Dream Come True"	2000	Andy Morahan
"Don't Stop Movin'"	2001	Andy Morahan
"Have You Ever"	2001	Julien Temple
"You"	2002	Julien Temple
"Alive"	2002	Nigel Dick
"Love Ain't Gonna Wait for You"	2003	—N/a
"Say Goodbye"	2003	Katie Bell
"These are the Days"	2023	Howard Greenhalgh
