= Essential S Club 7 =

Greatest hits album by S Club 7
- Released: 9 July 2021
- Recorded: 1999–2003
- Genre: Pop; dance-pop
- Label: Spectrum
- Producer: various

S Club 7 chronology
Best: The Greatest Hits of S Club 7 (2003)	Essential S Club 7 (2021)

Essential S Club 7 is a greatest hits compilation album by British pop group S Club 7, released on 9 July 2021.

The 3xCD collection features tracks from across all four S Club 7 studio albums and all their singles, as well as a disc of remixes. The album debuted at number 35 on the UK Albums Chart.

== Track listing ==
Disc 1
No.	Title	Writer(s)	Album	Length
1.	"S Club Party"	Mikkel Storleer Eriksen; Tor Erik Hermansen; Hallegir Rustan	S Club, 1999	3:30
2.	"Bring It All Back"	Tina Barrett; Paul Cattermole; Eliot Kennedy; Jon Lee; Tim Lever; Bradley McIntosh; Jo O'Meara; Mike Percy; Hannah Spearritt; Rachel Stevens	S Club	3:29
3.	"Don't Stop Movin'"	Barrett; Cattermole; Simon Ellis; Lee; McIntosh; O'Meara; Sheppard Solomon; Spearritt; Stevens	Sunshine, 2001	3:54
4.	"Say Goodbye" (credited to S Club)	Chris Braide; Cathy Dennis	Best: The Greatest Hits of S Club 7, 2003	3:54
5.	"Reach"	Dennis; Andrew Todd	7, 2000	4:05
6.	"Natural" (single version)	Norma Ray; Jean Fredenucci; Dennis; Todd	7	3:16
7.	"You" (single version)	Kennedy; Percy; Lever; Tim Woodcock	Sunshine	3:33
8.	"Alive" (credited to S Club)	Ellis; Solomon	Seeing Double	3:43
9.	"So Right"	Dennis; Daniel Poku	"Bring It All Back" B-Side / S Club Japanese edition	3:44
10.	"The Long and Winding Road"	John Lennon; Paul McCartney	"You" B-Side	3:44
11.	"Everybody Get Pumped" (credited to S Club)	Gregg Alexander	Best: The Greatest Hits of S Club 7 UK edition	3:14
12.	"Gangsta Love" (credited to S Club)	Nigel Butler; Ray Hedges; Tracey Ackerman	Seeing Double	3:20
13.	"Summertime Feeling"	Adam Ryan Carter; Cattermole; Christine McVie; Mark Hadfield	Sunshine	3:16
14.	"Gonna Change the World"	Angela Lupino; Simon Franglen	S Club	4:06
15.	"Love Train"	Dennis; Todd	7	3:41
16.	"Everybody Wants You"	Tracy Ackerman; Andy Watkins; Paul Wilson	S Club	3:09
17.	"All In Love Is Fair"	Dennis; Ellis	7	4:16

Disc 2
No.	Title	Writer(s)	Album	Length
1.	"Never Had a Dream Come True"	Dennis; Ellis	7 re-issue & Sunshine	4:01
2.	"Have You Ever"	Andrew Frampton; Dennis; Chris Braide	Sunshine	3:23
3.	"You're My Number One" (Miami 7 version)	Nick Foster; Mike Rose	S Club	3:23
4.	"Two in a Million"	Dennis; Ellis	S Club	3:36
5.	"Love Ain't Gonna Wait for You"	Ellis; Solomon	Seeing Double	3:49
6.	"Bring the House Down"	Ackerman; Watkins; Wilson	7	3:02
7.	"Viva la Fiesta"	Dennis; Eriksen; Hermansen; Rustan	"S Club Party" B-Side / S Club	3:08
8.	"If It's Love"	Dennis; Ellis	"Natural" B-Side	4:08
9.	"I'll Be There"	Dennis; Poku	"Reach" B-Side / 7	3:23
10.	"Right Guy"	Dennis; McIntosh	"Don't Stop Movin'" B-Side / Sunshine UK edition	3:42
11.	"Discotek" (credited to S Club)	Barrett; Julian Gingell; Barry Stone	"Alive" B-Side	3:19
12.	"Whole Lotta Nothing" (credited to S Club)	Lars Jensen; Martin Larsson; Mick Lister	Seeing Double	3:26
13.	"Dance Dance Dance"	Dennis; Gingell; Stone	Sunshine	3:47
14.	"Friday Night"	Stephen Emmanuel; Tim Laws	S Club	3:49
15.	"The Colour of Blue"	Lars Aass; Bottolf Lødemel	7	3:14
16.	"Our Time Has Come"	Barrett; Cattermole; Kennedy; Lee; Lever; McIntosh; O'Meara; Percy; Spearritt; Stevens	"S Club Party" B-Side	4:21
17.	"Hello Friend"	Barrett; Cattermole; Kennedy; Lee; Lever; McIntosh; O'Meara; Percy; Spearritt; Stevens	"Bring It All Back" B-Side	3:01
18.	"Hey Kitty Kitty" (credited to S Club)	Stephen Lee; Wayne Wilkins; Avril Mackintosh	Seeing Double	3:14

Disc 3
No.	Title	Writer(s)	Album	Length
1.	"S Club Party" (Jason Nevins club mix)	Eriksen; Hermansen; Rustan	"S Club Party" single	7:22
2.	"Bring It All Back" (K-Klass club mix)	Barrett; Cattermole; Kennedy; Lee; Lever; McIntosh; O'Meara; Percy; Spearritt; Stevens	"Bring It All Back" single	6:13
3.	"Reach" (Almighty remix)	Dennis; Todd	"Never Had a Dream Come True" single	6:13
4.	"Bring the House Down" (Solaris Mix)	Ackerman; Watkins; Wilson	"Bring the House Down" promo single	7:16
5.	"Two in a Million" (Boyfriends & Birthdays version)	Dennis; Ellis	"Two in a Million" single / 7 US edition	3:36
6.	"You're My Number One" (Almighty mix)	Foster; Rose	"Natural" single	10:45
7.	"Stronger" (ATFC Twelvetoten vocal)	Barrett; Cattermole; Ellis; Lee; McIntosh; Ryan Molloy; O'Meara; Spearritt; Stevens	"Stronger" promo single	7:40
8.	"Love Ain't Gonna Wait for You" (Illicit vocal mix) (credited to S Club)	Ellis; Solomon	"Say Goodbye" / "Love Ain't Gonna Wait for You" single	8:10
9.	"Perfect Christmas"	Dennis; Ellis	"Never Had a Dream Come True" B-Side	4:38

== Charts ==
Chart (2021)	Peak position
Scottish Albums (OCC)	5
UK Albums (OCC)	35
UK Physical Albums Chart	6
