= Bring It All Back 2015 =

2015 concert tour by S Club 7

- Tour by S Club 7
- Location: United Kingdom
- Associated albums: Best: The Greatest Hits of S Club 7
- Start date: 7 May 2015
- End date: 21 May 2015
- Legs: 1
- No. of shows: 12

S Club 7 concert chronology
- S Club United Tour (2003); Bring It All Back 2015 (2015); Good Times Tour (2023)

Bring It All Back 2015 was the fourth concert tour by English pop group S Club 7. It was their first concert tour in 12 years. This was the final tour to feature Paul Cattermole, prior to his death (in April 2023); it was also the final tour to feature member Hannah Spearritt.

== Support acts ==
- AJ (7–21 May 2015)

== Setlist ==
1. "Bring the House Down"
2. "S Club Party"
3. "You're My Number One"
4. "Love Ain't Gonna Wait for You"
5. "Two in a Million"
6. "Alive"
7. "Stronger" (Tina solo)
8. "Reach" (acoustic version) (Paul solo)
9. "Straight Up" (Paula Abdul cover) (Hannah solo)
10. "Hello Friend" (Jon and Jo duet)
11. "Natural"
12. "Have You Ever"
13. "You"
14. Medley Remix: "Good Times"/"Friday Night"/"Dance Dance Dance"/"Do It Till We Drop"/"Who Do You Think You Are?" (Bradley solo as DJ)
15. "Some Girls"/"Sweet Dreams My L.A. Ex" (Rachel solo)
16. "Viva La Fiesta"
17. "Bring It All Back"
18. "Uptown Funk" (Mark Ronson and Bruno Mars cover)
19. "Say Goodbye"
20. "Reach"
  Encore
21. "Never Had a Dream Come True"
22. "Don’t Stop Movin'"

== Tour dates ==
Date	City	Country	Venue
7 May 2015	Birmingham	England	Genting Arena
8 May 2015	Manchester	England	Manchester Arena
9 May 2015	Newcastle	England	Metro Radio Arena
11 May 2015	Bournemouth	England	Windsor Hall
12 May 2015	Cardiff	Wales	Motorpoint Arena Cardiff
13 May 2015	Liverpool	England	Echo Arena Liverpool
15 May 2015	Nottingham	England	Capital FM Arena
16 May 2015	London	England	The O_{2} Arena
17 May 2015	London	England	The O_{2} Arena
19 May 2015	Leeds	England	First Direct Arena
20 May 2015	Glasgow	Scotland	SSE Hydro
21 May 2015	Sheffield	England	Motorpoint Arena Sheffield

- 17 May was an extra date added due to popular demand.
