= Don't Stop Movin' (S Club album) =

Compilation album by S Club
- Released: 17 December 2002 (United States)
- Recorded: 2000–2002
- Genre: Pop
- Length: 50:16
- Label: Interscope

S Club chronology
Seeing Double (2002)	Don't Stop Movin' (2002)	Best: The Greatest Hits of S Club 7 (2003)

Don't Stop Movin' is a U.S.-only compilation album from S Club. The album contains a combination of tracks from Sunshine and Seeing Double (six from the former, eight from the latter). It was released in December 2002. It failed to chart or produce any hit singles, following the top 10 success of "Never Had a Dream Come True". This was to be the group's final release in the U.S.

== Track listing ==
No.	Title	Writer(s)	Album	Length
1.	"Don't Stop Movin'"	Jo O'Meara; Paul Cattermole; Bradley McIntosh; Tina Barrett; Hannah Spearritt; Rachel Stevens; Jon Lee; Sheppard Solomon; Simon Ellis	Sunshine, 2001	3:53
2.	"Whole Lotta Nothin'"	Lars Jensen; Martin Larsson; Mick Lister	Seeing Double, 2002	3:26
3.	"Do It Til We Drop"	Cathy Dennis; Jonny Lisners	Seeing Double	3:43
4.	"You" (single version)	Eliot Kennedy; Mike Percy; Tim Lever; Tim Woodcock	Sunshine	3:31
5.	"Have You Ever"	Andrew Frampton; Cathy Dennis; Chris Braide	Sunshine	3:22
6.	"Gangsta Love"	Ray Hedges; Nigel Butler; Tracy Ackerman	Seeing Double	3:21
7.	"Alive"	Ellis; Solomon	Seeing Double	3:41
8.	"Show Me Your Colours"	Anna-Lena Högdahl; David Eriksen	Sunshine	3:10
9.	"Dance"	Ellis; Solomon	Seeing Double	3:23
10.	"The Greatest"	Stephen Kipner; David Frank; Nathan Butler	Seeing Double	3:46
11.	"Sunshine"	Dennis; O'Meara; Cattermole; McIntosh; Barrett; Spearritt; Stevens; Lee; Yak Bondy	Sunshine	3:53
12.	"Dance, Dance, Dance"	Dennis; Julian Gingell; Barry Stone	Sunshine	3:47
13.	"Who Do You Think You Are?"	Dennis; Lisners	Seeing Double	3:38
14.	"Straight from the Heart"	Henry Binns; Yoyo Olugbo; Barrett; Lee; McIntosh; O'Meara; Spearritt; Stevens	Seeing Double	3:42
Total length:				50:16
