= Best: The Greatest Hits of S Club 7 =

- Original 2003 release

Greatest hits album by S Club 7
- Released: 2 June 2003
- Recorded: 1999–2003
- Genre: Pop; dance-pop
- Length: 47:43 (original international version); 53:48 (original UK version); 60:34 (2015 reissue)
- Label: Polydor
- Producer: Phil Bodger; Cathy Dennis; Simon Ellis; Daniel Frampton; Eliot Kennedy; Tim Lever; Stephen Lipson; Oskar Paul; Mike Percy; Jeremy Wheatley; Andy Wright

S Club 7 chronology
Don't Stop Movin' (2002)	Best: The Greatest Hits of S Club 7 (2003)	Essential S Club 7 (2021)

Alternative cover
- 2015 re-release

Singles from Best: The Greatest Hits of S Club 7
- 1. "Say Goodbye" Released: 26 May 2003; 2. "Love Ain't Gonna Wait for You" Released: 26 May 2003

Best: The Greatest Hits of S Club 7 is a greatest hits compilation album released from S Club 7. Released on 2 June 2003, it includes all 13 singles from the band, plus a bonus track, "Everybody Get Pumped". A DVD was produced to coincide with the release and contained all 13 music videos, as well as bonus, rare unreleased interviews with the band on the release of each of their previous albums. The album peaked at number two on the UK Albums Chart, kept off the top spot by You Gotta Go There to Come Back by Stereophonics.

The album was remastered by Abbey Road Studios and re-issued on 4 May 2015, including the previously unreleased track, "Rain".

== Chart performance ==
The album debuted and peaked at number 2 on 14 June 2003, returning to the chart at number 35 after the 2015 rerelease. As of 2015, the album has sold 371,894 copies in the United Kingdom.

After band member Paul Cattermole died on 6 April 2023, the album saw a spike in sales. On 14 April 2023, Best: The Greatest Hits of S Club 7 charted at number 7 on the Official Album Downloads Chart Top 100.

== Track listing ==
No.	Title	Writer(s)	Producer(s)	Length
1.	"Bring It All Back" (from S Club, 1999)	Eliot Kennedy; Tim Lever; Mike Percy; S Club 7	Kennedy; Lever; Percy; Andy Wright^{[a]}	3:29
2.	"S Club Party" (from S Club)	Mikkel Storleer Eriksen; Tor Erik Hermansen; Hallegir Rustan	Stargate; Jeremy Wheatley^{[a]}	3:30
3.	"Two in a Million" (Boyfriends & Birthdays version) (from S Club)	Cathy Dennis; Simon Ellis	Stargate; Wheatley^{[a]}	3:36
4.	"You're My Number One" (Miami 7 version) (from S Club)	Mike Rose; Nick Foster	Absolute	3:27
5.	"Reach" (from 7, 2000)	Dennis; Andrew Todd	Todd; Wright^{[a]}; Stephen Lipson^{[a]}	4:05
6.	"Natural" (single version) (from 7)	Norma Ray; Jean Fredenucci; Dennis; Todd	Dennis; Phil Bodger; Absolute^{[b]}	3:16
7.	"Never Had a Dream Come True" (from 7 & Sunshine, 2001)	Dennis; Ellis	Dennis; Oskar Paul; Lipson^{[a]}	4:01
8.	"Don't Stop Movin'" (from Sunshine)	S Club 7; Ellis; Sheppard Solomon	Ellis; Lipson^{[a]}	3:54
9.	"Have You Ever" (from Sunshine)	Andrew Frampton; Dennis; Chris Braide	Lipson	3:23
10.	"You" (single version) (from Sunshine)	Kennedy; Percy; Lever; Tim Woodcock	Steelworks; Lipson^{[a]}	3:33
11.	"Alive" (from Seeing Double, 2002)	Ellis; Solomon	Ellis; Lipson^{[a]}	3:43
12.	"Love Ain't Gonna Wait for You" (single version) (from Seeing Double)	Ellis; Solomon	Dan Frampton; Ellis; Lipson^{[a]}	3:49
13.	"Say Goodbye" (Previously unreleased, 2003)	Braide; Dennis	Lipson	3:54
Total length:				47:43

UK edition bonus tracks
No.	Title	Writer(s)	Producers	Length
14.	"Everybody Get Pumped" (Previously unreleased, 2001)	Gregg Alexander	Alexander	3:14
15.	"Bring the House Down" (from 7)	Tracy Ackerman; Andy Watkins; Paul Wilson	Absolute	3:02
Total length:				53:48

2015 re-release edition bonus tracks
No.	Title	Writer(s)	Album	Length
16.	"Friday Night" (from S Club)	Stephen Emmanuel; Tim Laws	Laws	3:49
17.	"Rain" (Previously unreleased, 2002)	Rose; Foster; S Club 7	Absolute	3:47
Total length:				60:34

Notes:

- ^{^a} signifies an additional producer
- ^{^b} signifies a co-producer

== Charts ==
=== Weekly charts ===
Weekly chart performance for Best: The Greatest Hits of S Club 7
Chart (2003)	Peak position
European Albums (European Albums Chart)	14
Irish Albums (IRMA)	22
Scottish Albums (OCC)	3
Singaporean Albums (RIAS)	9
UK Albums (OCC)	2
Chart (2014)	Peak position
Irish Albums (IRMA)	72
Scottish Albums (OCC)	52
UK Download (OCC)	20
Chart (2015)	Peak position
UK Download (OCC)	31
Chart (2020)	Peak position
UK Download (OCC)	83
Chart (2023)	Peak position
UK Download (OCC)	7

Weekly chart performance for Best: The Greatest Hits of S Club 7 (2015 reissue)
Chart (2015)	Peak position
Scottish Albums (OCC)	27
UK Albums (OCC)	35

=== Year-end charts ===
Chart (2003)	Position
UK Albums (OCC)	57

== Certifications and sales ==
Certifications for Best: The Greatest Hits of S Club 7
Region	Certification	Certified units/sales
United Kingdom (BPI)	Platinum	371,894

== Release history ==
Release history and formats for Best: The Greatest Hits of S Club 7
Country	Release date	Version
United Kingdom	2 June 2003	Original
United Kingdom	4 May 2015	Re-issue
