= Viva S Club =

- Opening titles
- Also known as: S Club in Barcelona
- Starring: S Club; Jeremy Xido; Alícia González Laá
- Opening theme: "Alive"
- Countries of origin: United Kingdom; Spain
- Original language: English
- No. of series: 1
- No. of episodes: 13

Production
- Running time: 25 mins (approx)
- Production company: 19 Entertainment

Original release
- Network: CBBC (on BBC One)
- Release: 20 September – 27 December 2002

Related
- Miami 7 (1999); L.A. 7 (2000); Hollywood 7 (2001); Seeing Double (2003 film)

Viva S Club is the fourth and final series in the BBC television series starring British pop group S Club. This is the only series that is not filmed in America, instead, it is filmed in Barcelona, Spain. The programme was shown every week on CBBC from 21 September 2002 to 14 December 2002 and stars all members of S Club. The show also features Alícia González Laá, as housekeeper Maria, and Jeremy Xido, as Lyall, their mentor from the record company of which the group are signed.

The series aired in the United States, once again changing its name. However, in a break from the previous "S Club 7 in ..." pattern, the show is simply called "S Club" on the title screen, however referred to as "S Club 7 in Barcelona" in promos and commercials. It aired on ABC Family from 20 September 2002 to 27 December 2002.

The series sees Paul Cattermole leave the group. This mirrors real life events, when in March 2002, Paul announced that he is to leave S Club. There is one post series event, a movie titled Seeing Double.

== Plot ==
As with past series, Viva S Club takes place following the events in Hollywood 7, in which the band has become popular Stateside, but not so much internationally. The series sees Paul Cattermole leave the group, featuring in only five episodes. The remainder of the series featured the events of the remaining S Club members who had renamed, S Club. The series sees the group gaining new manager Mr Wendelbaum, who employs Lyall and Maria as their mentor and housekeeper.

The final episode titled Let's Get Out of Here, somewhat made fun of the way their series ended, the plot of the finale centred on Tina and a recent break up with a boyfriend whose dad happens to be a Mafioso leader. In the midst of the episode the group reminisce over the past few years and in the end they jump on a boat that was heading to Egypt before Jo pilots the boat back to the United Kingdom.

== Cast ==
=== Main ===
- Tina Barrett as Tina
- Paul Cattermole as Paul (first 5 episodes)
- Jon Lee as Jon
- Bradley McIntosh as Bradley
- Jo O'Meara as Jo
- Hannah Spearritt as Hannah
- Rachel Stevens as Rachel
- Jeremy Xido as Lyall Robinson
- Alícia González Laá as Maria

=== Recurring ===
- Montse Mostaza as Consuela

== Episodes ==
Title	U.S. airdate	U.K. airdate	S Club song	#
"The Fame in Spain"	20 September 2002	21 September 2002	"Summertime Feeling"	40
S Club have a new manager, Mr. Wendelbaum, who decides to send the group to Barcelona, Spain to write their new album. They soon meet Lyall, who works for the record company, and Maria, their very own housekeeper. The group feel a little disappointed that, after success in the US, no one recognises them in Spain. Bradley soon threatens to quit the group and become a painter; the future of the band becomes in doubt. This episode featured an appearance from S Club 8.
"A Problem Like Maria"	27 September 2002	28 September 2002	"Don't Stop Movin'"	41
The band find it difficult to settle into Spanish life: Tina misses L.A., Lyall gets upset when they try to give him a few pointers how to do his job, and Maria starts to behave different. The group find out that she has had to keep down multiple jobs as she feels as if her wage is not big enough. The group try to find a way of how to get her paid more money.
"Jon De Bergerac"	11 October 2002	5 October 2002	"Sunshine"	42
After Bradley falls for a girl, he asks Jon to pen romantic letters and rhymes on his behalf, as he feels he is not up to the job. Jon gets into his new role and keeps sending the letters even when Bradley's relationship has ended. Hannah & Rachel attempt to give Jo a 'ladylike' makeover. Meanwhile, Paul and Tina are having a different problem; they are suffering from writer's block.
"Goodbye Is the Hardest Word"	18 October 2002	12 October 2002	"Hello Friend"	43
Paul confesses to Hannah that he is ready to leave the band. He wants Hannah to help him break the bad news to the others. The band take the news hard, and try to persuade Paul to stay. Elsewhere, Jon tries to learn how to become a matador and Jo and Tina ban junk food in the house. Meanwhile, Lyall takes up a new habit of spending his time gazing at a local waitress.
"Absent Friends"	25 October 2002	19 October 2002	"Straight from the Heart"	44
The band decide that they have to remain together and shorten their name from "S Club 7" to simply "S Club". The group are missing Paul and are really upset until they decide to take over Paul's favourite local club, Club Catalan. There, they discover that Paul has one last surprise for the band before he goes on to leave the band. Paul's departure mirrors his exit from the band in real life. Meanwhile, Lyall pursues a certain waitress with the help of Maria.
"Shakedown"	1 November 2002	26 October 2002	"Do It 'Till We Drop"	45
The band get lost in redecorating the club but Rachel and Tina cannot decide upon which colour to paint the walls. Meanwhile, Jon and Bradley battle to create the best cocktail and become Cocktail King.
"Superstition"	8 November 2002	2 November 2002	"Gangsta Love"	46
Lyall tries to get S Club's latest demo played by cult radio personality, El Porco. However, the DJ is only interested in taking advantage of Lyall. To make matters worse, the group have a run of bad luck when Tina loses her lucky ring, Maria breaks her ankle and El Porco ends up in hospital after one of the band's gigs.
"Spanish Jon"	15 November 2002	9 November 2002	"Never Had a Dream Come True"	47
Jon surprises the band by announcing that he is Spanish as he has discovered the existence of a long lost relative and national hero, Don Edouardo Crespo de la Mancha Lee. Jon embraces the Spanish lifestyle by insisting on eating late, taking siestas and going out to party late into the morning. The band also have to cheer up a broken-hearted Maria.
"The Rain in Spain"	22 November 2002	16 November 2002	"Let Me Sleep"	48
Jo becomes more than just friends with a local Spanish footballer. As he is up for a transfer to a UK club, Jo offers to help him with his English. However, the transfer comes through and Jo realises that she does not want to let him go. Maria's advice on how to resolve Jo's problems ends up influencing Lyall to finally make a move on the local waitress.
"Of Mice and Music"	6 December 2002	23 November 2002	"Dance"	49
The band discover that they have an infestation of mice, just before the food inspector arrives. The band are also told that they do not have a valid license to play at the club, and so it would be illegal if the gig went ahead. In desperation, Rachel takes him on a date to try and change his mind and allow them to play. The episode takes its name from the John Steinbeck novel, "Of Mice and Men".
"Survival"	13 December 2002	30 November 2002	"Hey Kitty Kitty"	50
After hitting the road to showcase their new songs, the band get lost in the middle of nowhere. So it is not good news when their tour bus is stolen and they are left to survive with very little. Jon and Jo undergo a transformation to become Tarzan and Jane while the rest of the guys plan how to fight off the wild animals and get them home.
"24 Minutes Till Doomsday"	20 December 2002	7 December 2002	"Alive"	51
With just twenty four minutes to go before the band take to the stage for an open-air concert, Rachel realises that she has forgotten Tina's birthday and so, Rachel has to dash to get her a last minute present. Meanwhile, Hannah is desperately searching for a ladies' toilet that is not out of order. In the midst of this, Lyall worries about his job when he spots S Club being secretive around him and is stalked by a mysterious man with a briefcase.
"Let's Get Out of Here"	27 December 2002	14 December 2002	"Discotek"	52
In the series finale, with all the band feeling homesick, they are happy to make an escape from Tina's ex-boyfriend who will not take no for an answer; his dad even wants them to get married. After an amazing chase, S Club reach Barcelona's docks and jump on a ship leaving for England. But as they congratulate themselves on their incredible escape, they realise that the boat is headed for Egypt, not Britain. Jo ties up the crew of the boat, which is uncalled for, and commandeers the ship, and for the first time in four seasons, the group head back to England.

== Soundtrack ==
Soundtrack from the series featured new music from their Seeing Double album, such as lead single "Alive", "Straight from the Heart", "Do It Till We Drop", "Gangsta Love", "Let Me Sleep", "Dance" and the b-side from Alive, "Discotek". An unreleased track at the time, "Rain", was also featured throughout the series.

== Home media ==
Unlike the previous three series, Viva S Club was never released on VHS or DVD worldwide. It has, however, been repeated several times on the CBBC Channel.
