= Seeing Double (album) =

Studio album by S Club
- Released: 25 November 2002
- Recorded: 2002
- Studios: London, England
- Genres: Pop; dance-pop; electropop
- Length: 61:05
- Label: Polydor
- Producers: Simon Ellis; Lars Halvor Jensen; Martin Larsson; Ben Chapman; Boo Dan; Ray Hedges; Jonny Lisners; Supergang; David Frank; Michael Rose; Nick Foster

S Club chronology
Sunshine (2001)	Seeing Double (2002)	Don't Stop Movin' (2002)

Singles from Seeing Double
- 1. "Alive" Released: 18 November 2002; 2. "Love Ain't Gonna Wait for You" Released: 26 May 2003

Professional ratings
Review scores
Source	Rating
The Guardian	3/5 stars

Seeing Double is the fourth studio album from S Club. It was the only album to be released under the name "S Club", after the group was rebranded when Paul Cattermole left the group in June 2002 after his departure announcement in March. It was used as the main musical influence to the film of the same name released in April 2003. Despite good reviews and reception, the album only managed to reach number 17 on the UK Albums Chart.

== Background ==
After Paul Cattermole's departure, vowing to not disband, the remaining six members remained together under the name S Club. Despite losing a member of the group, the future remained positive as, although they were very sad to see Cattermole leave the group, they were "delighted" to have extended their contracts meaning they could look forward to new material, a new series of their television show as well as their first feature film. However, media reports of the time were not so optimistic stating that, as neither the Spice Girls nor Take That had survived once they lost a member of their group, it would be difficult for S Club to remain together in an industry which has a "horrible habit of leaving bands in tatters once the first member has left".

"Hey Kitty Kitty" (initially just called "Hey Kitty") was the first promotional track of the album, released as a special feature for Sunny Delight. In November 2002, the band released their first single "Alive", as a six piece. The single featured remixes from the likes of Almighty and Flip & Fill, as well as a remix by Kurtis Mantronik for the track "Dance", which was featured alongside "Alive" in some promotional sales. After the single only peaked at number-five in the UK charts, S Club's positivism was diminished. Although their progressive musical style was once again furthered with the release of their fourth studio album, Seeing Double, it failed to make an impact on the UK charts, stalling at number-seventeen. Besides the above three songs, some of the other tracks in the album also featured in the Viva S Club series, such as "Straight from the Heart", "Do It Till We Drop", "Gangsta Love", "Let Me Sleep", "Dance" and the b-side from Alive, "Discotek".

In April 2003, S Club released their first feature film, Seeing Double, directed by music-video director Nigel Dick, which was to be the last time the group would be seen on-screen together. Unlike its television predecessors, the film moved into the realm of children's fantasy, and saw the group fighting evil scientist Victor Gaghan in his quest to clone the world's pop stars. The movie also featured additional album tracks that hadn't featured in the television series, such as "Whole Lotta Nothin'","Love Ain't Gonna Wait for You", and "Who Do You Think You Are?", amongst others.

Despite positive feedback from critics for S Club's shift to a mature sound in the album, their time at the top of the charts was slowly coming to an end, and when Jo O'Meara announced that she had an immobilising back condition which could have left her in a wheelchair, and she was unable to take part in television performances, the group was left devastated. Rachel Stevens stepped in to re-record and replace O'Meara for lead vocals of "Alive", "Love Ain't Gonna Wait for You" and "Dance" during live performances.

The film's release meanwhile, was marked by many rumours that the group were about to split, which were quickly denied by the six. However, ten days after the release of their movie, the rumours were confirmed when it was announced live on stage—during their S Club United Tour on 21 April 2003 – that, after a final single and greatest hits album, S Club would part ways. The group cited a mutual split, expressing it was simply a time "to move on and face new challenges". Many fans felt "betrayed" and "disappointed" by the breakup, as well as "angry" due to the group denying rumours only two weeks before at the Seeing Double premiere. Many compared the demise of the group to that of fellow pop group Steps, as they too had denied their intentions until the moment before their split, after which they were accused of acting out of "greed and cynicism". Since the split, the members of S Club have commented on how exhausting being in the group was, due to hectic schedules and long filming days.

The release of the second and final single from the album in May 2003, "Love Ain't Gonna Wait for You", was featured as a double A-side alongside "Say Goodbye", a song that featured only in their final compilation album, Best: The Greatest Hits of S Club 7. The single peaked at number 2 in the UK Singles chart.

== Track listing ==
No.	Title	Writer(s)	Producer(s)	Length
1.	"Alive" (^{1} ^{2})	Simon Ellis; Sheppard Solomon	Ellis; Stephen Lipson^{[a]}	3:42
2.	"Whole Lotta Nothin'" (^{1})	Lars Jensen; Martin Larsson; Mick Lister	Jensen; Larsson	3:26
3.	"Love Ain't Gonna Wait for You" (^{1})	Ellis; Solomon	Dan Frampton; Ellis	3:47
4.	"Bittersweet"	Ben Chapman; Lucie Silvas	Chapman	3:39
5.	"Straight from the Heart"	Henry Binns; Yoyo Olugbo; Tina Barrett; Jon Lee; Bradley McIntosh; Jo O'Meara; Hannah Spearritt; Rachel Stevens	Boo Dan	3:43
6.	"Gangsta Love"	Ray Hedges; Nigel Butler; Tracy Ackerman	Hedges	3:20
7.	"Who Do You Think You Are?" (^{1})	Cathy Dennis; Jonny Lisners	Johnny L.	3:38
8.	"Do It Til We Drop" (^{1})	Dennis; Lisners	Johnny L.	3:43
9.	"Hey Kitty Kitty"	Stephen Lee; Wayne Wilkins; Avril Mackintosh	Sugargang	3:56
10.	"Dance" (^{1})	Ellis; Solomon	Ellis	3:24
11.	"Secret Love"	Thomas Nichols; Tim Laws; Barrett	Laws	3:47
12.	"The Greatest" (^{3})	Stephen Kipner; David Frank; Nathan Butler	Frank	3:47
13.	"In Too Deep"	J. Lee; Hedges; Butler; Ackerman	Hedges	3:00
14.	"Let Me Sleep" (^{4})	Michael Rose; Nick Foster; Kim Fuller	Rose; Foster	3:25

UK special edition bonus tracks
No.	Title	Writer(s)	Producer(s)	Length
15.	"Every Kinda People" (^{5})	Andy Fraser	Absolute	3:46
16.	"Alive" (Almighty Mix)	Ellis; Solomon	Ellis; Almighty^{[a]}	7:02

B-side songs
No.	Title	Writer(s)	Producer(s)	Length
17.	"Discotek"	Julian Gingell; Barry Stone; Barrett	Jewels & Stone	3:19
18.	"Special Kind of Something"	Kavana; Andy Watkins; Paul Wilson; Eliot Kennedy	Absolute	3:46

=== Notes ===
==== Production ====
- ^[a] signifies an additional producer.

==== Other ====
1. Featured in the film Seeing Double.
2. Rachel Stevens' version of "Alive" was only made available for the first time, via digital streaming, on 2 February 2024.
3. This song was originally recorded by American pop group, Scene 23.
4. This song was recorded before former bandmate Paul Cattermole left the band; his vocals can be heard towards the final chorus of the song.
5. This song was recorded by Jo O'Meara as part of the soundtrack for the 2002 movie, The Guru, used during the end credits. It was included as a bonus track on this album.

== Charts and certifications ==
=== Weekly charts ===
Weekly chart performance for Seeing Double
Chart (2002)	Peak position
European Albums (European Albums Chart)	74
Irish Albums (IRMA)	70
Scottish Albums (Official Charts)	24
UK Albums (Official Charts)	17

=== Year-end charts ===
Year-end chart performance for Seeing Double
Chart (2002)	Position
UK Albums Chart	116

=== Certifications ===
Certifications for Seeing Double
Region	Certification	Certified units/sales
United Kingdom (BPI)	Gold	100,000^{^}
^{^} Shipments figures based on certification alone.
