= 7 (S Club 7 album) =

Studio album by S Club 7
- Released: 12 June 2000
- Recorded: 1999–2000
- Studio: London, England
- Genre: Pop; hip hop soul; R&B
- Length: 36:12
- Label: Polydor; Interscope; A&M
- Producer: Cathy Dennis; Thomas Russo Jr.; Phil Bodger; Simon Ellis; Absolute; Tim Laws; Andrew Todd; Kai Robøle; Kenneth M. Lewis; Danny D; StarGate; Simon Franglen; Oskar Paul

S Club 7 chronology
S Club (1999)	7 (2000)	Sunshine (2001)

Alternative cover
- US album cover

Singles from 7
- 1. "Reach" Released: 22 May 2000; 2. "Natural" Released: 11 September 2000

Professional ratings
Review scores
Source	Rating
AllMusic	3/5 stars
PopMatters	unfavourable

7 is the second studio album by British pop group S Club 7. It was released by Polydor Records on 12 June 2000, and 14 November 2000 in North America. The album was primarily produced by Cathy Dennis and Simon Ellis. It became the group's most successful album release, and reached number one in the United Kingdom, where it was certified triple platinum. The album peaked at number sixty-nine on the Billboard 200 albums chart and was certified gold.

The album was re-released on 4 December 2000 to include S Club's 2000 Children in Need single "Never Had a Dream Come True". The re-release also included a previously unreleased cover of Stevie Wonder's "Lately" (later included on that year's Motown Mania compilation), replaced the original album version of "Natural" with the radio edit, as well as including CD-ROM videos of both "Reach" and "Natural". The colour scheme of the album was changed slightly also, with more purple and lilac tones instead of blue.

== Background ==
In February 2000, the group won the 'British Breakthrough Act' award at the 2000 BRIT Awards. In April 2000, S Club's second TV series, L.A. 7 (renamed S Club 7 in L.A. in the US), was released. The series saw the group depart from Miami and move to Los Angeles to seek a record deal. It introduced the song "Reach", another retro-styled uptempo track, which was co-written by Cathy Dennis and aired as the main theme tune to the second series. "Reach" was released as a single in May 2000 and reached number-two in the UK charts. It arguably became one of the group's most successful singles, paving the way for the group's second album, 7 which was released on 12 June 2000. This album was a departure from the overtly pop stylings of S Club, with several tracks styled more towards R&B and hip hop soul than the traditional nineties pop sound of their debut album. It reached number one in the UK charts becoming certified Triple Platinum, and a certified Gold record in the US. The second single from the album, '"Natural", featured Stevens as lead vocalist. It reached number-three in September 2000.

S Club 7 took an active part in promoting several different charities during their time as a band. As well as performing for Children in Need, the band launched, on 25 September 2000, a new television series called S Club 7 Go Wild! which saw each band member support an endangered species. Teaming up with the World Wildlife Fund, each member travelled to different destinations worldwide with a hope to raise awareness about the seven endangered creatures, including the Siberian tiger and the hyacinth macaw. In October 2000, they launched the annual Poppy Appeal Campaign with Dame Thora Hird and supported Woolworth's Kids First Campaign throughout 1999 and 2000. The group also recorded vocals for "It's Only Rock 'N' Roll", which raised money for Children's Promise, an alliance of seven children's charities: Barnardo's, Children in Need, ChildLine, The Children's Society, Comic Relief, NCH and the NSPCC. A cover of The Rolling Stones song, the group contributed to the vocals alongside many popular artists, including Mary J. Blige, Natalie Imbruglia and the Spice Girls; it entered the UK charts at number-nineteen. Also during that time they filmed two specials: Artistic Differences and their Christmas Special.

In November 2000, S Club 7 were invited to provide the official song for the UK's BBC Children in Need Campaign 2000, so a new song, the ballad "Never Had a Dream Come True", was recorded. The song became popular in the US market eventually taking the group to appear on MTV's TRL to perform the song and chosen to appear at the "Now That's What I Call Music" US Edition. After topping the UK charts in December 2000, the song was added to a re-release of the 7 album, along with another new track, a cover of Stevie Wonder's "Lately". After the album's re-release, remixes by Almighty and Solaris were commissioned for 'Bring The House Down'. This, along with the song being a fan favourite, indicated that the song was to be released as the next single. However, plans for this were scrapped and the band decided to focus on the next album. The Almighty mix later received a commercial release on the 'You' single. It was only in 2024, that the EP was released along with the two remixes on streaming platforms. "Spiritual Love" was originally recorded by Urban Species in 1994. The original version was used in TV ads of L'Oréal in the 1990s and in the movie Rainbow from 1996. "Stand By You" was originally performed by Danish duo S.O.A.P. in 1997. "Natural" is an adaptation of the song "Tous Les Maux D'Amour" by French singer Norma Ray. "Cross My Heart" was covered by Polish singer Edyta Górniak for her 2002 album Invisible. "Someday, Someway" is a cover of the original by Marshall Crenshaw. In December 2023, the B-side to Never Had a Dream Come True, "Perfect Christmas", was released as a stand-alone EP on all streaming platforms.

== Track listing ==
Standard edition
No.	Title	Writer(s)	Producer(s)	Length
1.	"Reach"	Cathy Dennis; Andrew Todd	Todd; Andy Wright^{[a]}; Stephen Lipson^{[a]}	4:04
2.	"Natural"	Norma Ray; Jean Fredenucci; Dennis; Todd	Dennis; Phil Bodger; Dave Way^{[a]}	3:22
3.	"I'll Keep Waiting"	Dennis; Simon Ellis	Ellis; Wright^{[a]}	3:38
4.	"Bring The House Down"	Tracy Ackerman; Andy Watkins; Paul Wilson	Absolute	3:02
5.	"Best Friend"	Stephen Emmanuel; Bradley McIntosh; Tim Laws	Laws	3:59
6.	"All in Love Is Fair"	Dennis; Ellis	Ellis	4:16
7.	"Love Train"	Dennis; Todd	Todd; Jeremy Wheatley^{[a]}	3:41
8.	"Cross My Heart"	Ackerman; Watkins; Wilson	Absolute	3:33
9.	"The Colour of Blue"	Lars Aass; Bottolf Lødemel	Kenneth M. Lewis	3:14
10.	"I'll Be There"	Dennis; Daniel Poku	Danny D	3:23

UK bonus tracks
No.	Title	Writer(s)	Producer(s)	Length
11.	"Stand by You"	Holger Lagerfeldt; Remee	Simon Franglen; Way^{[a]}	3:04
12.	"Spiritual Love"	Peter Akinrinlola	Oskar Paul	3:52

UK reissue bonus tracks
No.	Title	Writer(s)	Producer(s)	Length
13.	"Lately"	Stevie Wonder	Franglen	4:33
14.	"Never Had a Dream Come True"	Dennis; Ellis	Dennis; Paul; Lipson^{[a]}	4:02

International bonus track
No.	Title	Writer(s)	Producer(s)	Length
11.	"Two in a Million" (Boyfriends & Birthdays version)	Dennis; Ellis	Stargate; Wheatley^{[a]}	3:34

International reissue bonus tracks
No.	Title	Writer(s)	Producer(s)	Length
12.	"Lately"	Wonder	Franglen	4:35
13.	"Never Had a Dream Come True"	Dennis; Ellis	Dennis; Paul; Lipson^{[a]}	4:01

Notes:

- ^{^a} signifies an additional producer
- The reissues of 7 use the single version of "Natural" in place of the album version.

== Charts ==
=== Weekly charts ===
Weekly chart performance for 7
Chart (2000–2001)	Peak position
Australian Albums (ARIA)	56
Belgian Albums (Ultratop Wallonia)	49
Canada Top Albums/CDs (RPM)	15
European Albums (European Albums Chart)	11
French Albums (SNEP)	69
German Albums (Offizielle Top 100)	25
Irish Albums (IRMA)	10
New Zealand Albums (RMNZ)	15
Scottish Albums (OCC)	2
Swedish Albums (Sverigetopplistan)	42
Swiss Albums (Schweizer Hitparade)	27
UK Albums (OCC)	1
US Billboard 200	69

=== Year-end charts ===
Year-end chart performance for 7
Chart (2000)	Position
Canadian Albums (Nielsen SoundScan)	79
UK Albums (OCC)	17
Chart (2001)	Position
Canadian Albums (Nielsen SoundScan)	185
UK Albums (OCC)	69
US Billboard 200	190

== Certifications ==
Region	Certification	Certified units/sales
Canada (Music Canada)	Platinum	100,000^{^}
New Zealand (RMNZ)	Gold	7,500^{^}
United Kingdom (BPI)	4× Platinum	1,200,000^{^}
United States (RIAA)	Gold	500,000^{^}
Summaries
Europe (IFPI)	Platinum	1,000,000^{*}
^{*} Sales figures based on certification alone.^{^} Shipments figures based on certification alone.
