= Alive (S Club song) =

2002 single by S Club 7

Single by S Club

from the album Seeing Double
- B-side: "Discotek"
- Released: 18 November 2002 (United Kingdom)
- Recorded: 2002, London, England
- Genre: Dance-pop
- Length: 3:42
- Label: Polydor; 19
- Songwriters: Simon Ellis; Sheppard Solomon
- Producer: Simon Ellis

S Club singles chronology
"You" (2002)	"Alive" (2002)	"Say Goodbye" / "Love Ain't Gonna Wait for You" (2003)

Music video
- "Alive" on YouTube

"Alive" is a song by S Club, released as a single on 18 November 2002. Called a "power-packed dancefloor thriller" in the Best inlay booklet, the track features strong disco beats and samples. "Alive" was the first single to be released under the "S Club" name rather than S Club 7, and it was also the first single to be released without Paul Cattermole. "Alive" was the penultimate S Club single and apart from the double A-side "Say Goodbye"/"Love Ain't Gonna Wait for You", was the only track to be released from the fourth album, Seeing Double. It reached number five on the UK Singles Chart, their only single not to reach the top three until 2023 release "These Are the Days", which failed to chart. The song also served as the main theme for Viva S Club, the band's final TV series. The B-side, "Discotek" was led and co-written by Tina Barrett, and features on the series finale.

The single also features remixes from Almighty, Flip & Fill and Bastone & Burnz, as well as a remix by Kurtis Mantronik for the track "Dance".

== Changes ==
There were several changes made to the Seeing Double album following Jo O'Meara's debilitating back condition, which meant she had to take time out of the heavy promo campaigns and gruelling schedules and dance routines. On "Alive", "Love Ain't Gonna Wait for You" and "Dance", the band re-recorded O'Meara's lead vocals to be performed by Rachel Stevens during live promotions. The release was originally planned to have CD1 with O'Meara, and CD2 with Stevens, but, the idea was later scrapped in favour of O'Meara's vocals. The version with Stevens was released on digital platforms on 2 February 2024. The song was the poorest charting and selling S Club single in the band's history, peaking at #5 in the UK. Another note of interest regarding "Alive" was revealed on CD:UK's behind the scenes footage of the making of the video where Bradley McIntosh revealed that the original version of the song showcased Paul Cattermole on lead vocals rather than himself.

== Music video ==
The video for "Alive", shot in Los Angeles, California, shows the group dancing in the "S" Club. "Alive" is the only music video from S Club not to feature previous band member Paul Cattermole.

The opening theme for "Viva S Club" features the group dancing to "Alive" in a villa without Cattermole, despite him being credited in 5 episodes of the series.

In Seeing Double, Cattermole can be seen during the shots of the band playing live.

== Track listing ==
- UK CD1
1. "Alive" (Radio Version)
2. "Dance" (Radio Version)
3. "Alive" (Almighty Mix)
4. "Alive" (CD-ROM Video)
- UK CD2
1. "Alive" (Radio Version)
2. "Discotek"
3. "Dance" (Harry's Afro Hut Wonky Remix)
- Cassette
1. "Alive" (Radio Version)
2. "Dance" (Radio Version)
3. "Alive" (Almighty Mix)
- Digital Single
1. "Alive" (Radio Edit)
2. "Dance" (Radio Version)
3. "Discotek"
4. "Alive" (Rachel's Lead Vocal Version)
5. "Alive" (Almighty Mix)
6. "Alive" (Flip & Fill Remix)
7. "Alive" (Bastone & Burnz Alive-N-Kik-N Mix)
8. "Dance" (Harry's Afro Hut Wonky Remix)

== Charts ==
=== Weekly charts ===
Chart (2002)	Peak position
Australia (ARIA)	30
Europe (Eurochart Hot 100)	27
Germany (GfK)	74
Ireland (IRMA)	11
Scotland Singles (OCC)	6
Switzerland (Schweizer Hitparade)	98
UK Singles (OCC)	5
UK Airplay (Music Week)	36

=== Year-end charts ===
Chart (2002)	Peak position
UK Singles (Official Charts Company)	166
