= Love Ain't Gonna Wait for You =

2003 single by S Club 7

Single by S Club

from the album Seeing Double and Best: The Greatest Hits of S Club 7
- A-side: "Say Goodbye"
- B-side: "Special Kind of Something"; "Bittersweet"
- Released: 26 May 2003
- Length: 3:48
- Label: Polydor; 19
- Songwriters: Simon Ellis; Sheppard Solomon
- Producers: Simon Ellis; Dan Frampton

S Club singles chronology
"Alive" (2002)	"Say Goodbye" / "Love Ain't Gonna Wait for You" (2003)	"These Are the Days" (2023)

Music video
- "Love Ain't Gonna Wait For You" on YouTube

"Love Ain't Gonna Wait for You" is a song by British pop group S Club and was originally the last single by the band, released on their final studio album Seeing Double and included on the compilation Best: The Greatest Hits of S Club 7. It was released in United Kingdom on 26 May 2003 as double A-side with "Say Goodbye". In other countries, only "Say Goodbye" was released as single.

== Music video ==
This video is a montage, incorporating scenes from the Seeing Double movie (which the song features in) along with shots from all their previous music videos, series of their TV show and the Carnival 2002 arena tour.

== Track listings ==
- UK CD1 and Australasian CD single
1. "Say Goodbye"
2. "Love Ain't Gonna Wait for You" (single remix)
3. "Special Kind of Something"
4. "Say Goodbye" (video)
5. Goodbye messages from Rachel, Tina and Bradley (video)
- UK CD2
1. "Say Goodbye"
2. "Bittersweet"
3. "Love Ain't Gonna Wait for You" (video)
4. Goodbye messages from Jon, Jo and Hannah (video)
- UK cassette single
1. "Say Goodbye"
2. "Love Ain't Gonna Wait for You" (Illicit vocal mix)
- Digital single
1. "Say Goodbye"
2. "Special Kind of Something"
3. "Bittersweet"
4. "Love Ain't Gonna Wait for You" (Single Remix)
5. "Love Ain't Gonna Wait for You" (Illicit Vocal Mix)
6. "Love Ain't Gonna Wait for You" (Illicit Dub Mix)
7. "Love Ain't Gonna Wait for You" (Bimbo Jones Club Mix)
8. "Love Ain't Gonna Wait for You" (Harry's Afro Hut 'Going Down' Mix)

== Credits and personnel ==
Credits are lifted from the UK CD1 liner notes.

Studios

- Produced at Strongroom Studios (London, England)
- Engineered and mixed at The Aquarium (London, England)
- Mastered at Transfermation (London, England)

Personnel

- Simon Ellis – writing, programming, production
- Sheppard Solomon – writing
- David Rainger – guitars
- Simon Hill – additional drum programming
- Nick Ingman – string arrangement, conducting
- Gavyn Wright – concertmaster
- Isobel Griffiths Ltd. – orchestra contracting
- Dan Frampton – production
- Stephen Lipson – additional production, additional programming
- Heff Moraes – mixing, engineering
- Richard Dowling – mastering

== Charts ==
All entries charted with "Say Goodbye".

=== Weekly charts ===
Chart (2003)	Peak position
Australia (ARIA)	75
Scotland Singles (OCC)	1
UK Singles (OCC)	2
UK Airplay (Music Week)	49

=== Year-end charts ===
Chart (2003)	Position
UK Singles (OCC)	53

== Release history ==
Region	Date	Format(s)	Label(s)	Ref.
United Kingdom	26 May 2003	CD; cassette	Polydor; 19	
Australia	7 July 2003	CD	Polydor; 19	
