= Norma Ray =

French singer-songwriter

Sylvie N'Doumbé (Saint-Étienne, March 21, 1970), stage name Norma Ray, is a French singer, songwriter. She is the daughter of Cameroon soccer star Frédéric N'Doumbé.

Norma has sung the French versions of songs on the soundtracks of French dubbed American films, including Sister Act 1 & 2, Lion King, Hercules etc. She has danced in the music video "U Got the Look" with Prince. She co-composed the song "Tous les maux d'amour" (Every heartache), which became a hit for Ray in 1999 (hitting the Top 10 singles chart in France) and one of the most played songs on radio stations in France, Canada, Switzerland and Belgium. The group S Club 7 made a cover version in English, which became an international hit entitled "Natural".

== Singles ==
- If it's love (1992)
- I believe in you (1993)
- Crazy About You (1994)
- I need love (1994)
- "Ready to go" (1995)
- Remember (1998)
- Tous les maux d'amour (1999)
- Emporte-moi (1999)
- Poussières d'étoiles (2000)
- Symphonie (2000)
- Si tu veux de moi (2001)
