= These Are the Days (S Club song) =

2023 song by S Club

Single by S Club
- Released: 26 July 2023
- Length: 3:06
- Label: Universal
- Songwriters: Simon Ellis; Johanne Ellis; Cathy Dennis
- Producer: John Nathaniel

S Club singles chronology
"Say Goodbye" / "Love Ain't Gonna Wait for You" (2003)	"These Are the Days" (2023)

Music video
- "These Are the Days" on YouTube

"These Are the Days" is a song by British pop music group S Club. It was released on 26 July 2023 in memory of Paul Cattermole. The song is the first new material recorded and released by the band in 20 years. This is the first release with the group as a quintet following Cattermole's death and Hannah Spearritt's departure.

== Background and composition ==
On 6 April 2023, band member Cattermole died of natural causes at the age of 46. S Club announced the release of the single on 23 July 2023. "These Are the Days" is the first song to feature S Club without vocals by Hannah Spearritt, although the video includes old footage of her, as part of the original lineup.

"These Are the Days" was written primarily by Simon Ellis and his wife Johanne Ellis, with contributions from Cathy Dennis, with production helmed by John Nathaniel.

Jo O'Meara has revealed that the song "was actually written for us twenty years ago, for the very first time around, but I think it probably wasn't right for us back then, and it just popped up again and it seemed like absolutely the perfect song for us to do and we've reworked the lyrics a little bit and made it more a tribute song".

The song was the first S Club single to not reach the top 5 in the UK, and was subsequently dropped from the North American leg of the Good Times tour in 2024.

== Music video ==
The music video, released on 26 July 2023, showed the group looking through photographs and memories of their time as a seven-piece group from 1999 to 2022. The video was directed by Howard Greenhalgh.

== Other versions ==
"These Are the Days" is the only single released by S Club to not feature a B-Side, remix or alternative version.

A different version of the song with a similar chorus was released by Now United for their album "The Musical: Welcome to the Night of Your Life" on 21 April 2023, a few months prior to S Club's release. Now United are also part of Simon Fuller's label XIX Entertainment and opened for S Club on their Good Times tour later that year.

== Track listings ==
- Digital single
1. "These Are The Days" – 3:05

== Charts ==
Chart performance for "These Are the Days"
Chart (2023–2024)	Peak position
UK Singles Downloads (OCC)	15
UK Singles Sales (OCC)	16
