= Sunshine (S Club 7 album) =

Studio album by S Club 7
- Released: 26 November 2001
- Recorded: 2000–2001
- Genres: Pop; dance-pop
- Length: 53:32
- Label: Polydor
- Producers: Simon Ellis; Stephen Lipson; Cathy Dennis; David Eriksen; Elliot Kennedy; Mike Percy; Tim Lever; Jonathan Shorten; Oskar Paul; Chris Samson; Yak Bondy; Julian Gingell; Barry Stone; Adam Ryan-Carter; Mark Hadfield

S Club 7 chronology
7 (2000)	Sunshine (2001)	Seeing Double (2002)

Singles from Sunshine
- 1. "Don't Stop Movin'" Released: 23 April 2001; 2. "Have You Ever" Released: 19 November 2001; 3. "You" Released: 11 February 2002

Sunshine is the third studio album by English pop group S Club 7. It was released on 26 November 2001 and features the hit singles "Don't Stop Movin'", "You", "Have You Ever" and "Never Had a Dream Come True"—all bar "You" peaking at number one before the album's release. The album debuted at number three on the UK Albums Chart in December 2001, selling more in its first week (136,000) than any of their other albums. It was later certified 2× Platinum after selling over 600,000 copies. Sunshine was the last album that featured Paul Cattermole as he announced his departure from the group in March 2002. The album peaked at number thirteen in New Zealand. The album also charted at number five on the 2001 UK year-end chart. The album was never released in the US, despite their success with the previous album, 7, which was certified gold after peaking at number sixty-nine on the Billboard 200.

In 2022, HMV released Sunshine on vinyl in celebration of their 100 years in business. The album was released in limited quantities but managed to peak at number 22 on the UK Vinyl Chart.

== Background ==
"Never Had a Dream Come True" marked a more mature direction for the group whilst still retaining their pop sensibilities, a direction which continued into their third studio album, Sunshine. The album contained what was to become one of S Club's most popular tracks, "Don't Stop Movin'". The song was released in April 2001, marked a high point for the group as the single went straight to number-one, went Platinum and became the seventh best selling single of 2001. McIntosh, who takes lead vocals with O'Meara in the track, said he was "nervous" about taking lead vocals and was worried how people would react. However, after the song went in at number one, he felt as though he was "supported by the fans," and his fears were alleviated. McIntosh also remarked that the single had broken new ground for the group, and Cattermole thought it to be their "best song by miles". The group won the Record of the Year award for the song, and in February 2002, the single won the group their second BRIT Award for best British single. The song has since been covered by The Beautiful South for their 2004 album Golddiggas, Headnodders and Pholk Songs, as well as by Starsailor who recorded it for BBC Radio 1's Live Lounge.

By spring 2001, the group was "desperate" to start touring; it was something which they had always wanted to do, but couldn't because things were "always so hectic". After spending most of early 2001 rehearsing, the S Club Party 2001 tour began on 19 May 2001. Describing the tour, Stevens remarked that seeing a crowd of over 13,000 fans each night coming to see them was "such an unbelievable feeling", and the other members of the group shared an "adrenaline rush" as well as a wave of emotion before going on stage. Once the tour was over, the group had to fly back to the United States to film the third series of their television show, Hollywood 7. This third series, which was still set in Los Angeles, was the group's favourite to film because they had more acting experience and could "drop their shoulders" and start to enjoy themselves. The group, however, had to continuously cope with intense schedules and early starts whilst recording for the programme, something which, although the group felt "laid back" about it at the time, was to eventually take its toll and lead to the demise of the band. Hollywood 7 began airing in September 2001 and dealt with the issue of an on-screen kiss between Spearritt and Cattermole, who had begun dating in real life. Their relationship, which was kept secret for six months, was well received by the band who claimed it had made them all closer as friends. Hollywood 7 aired alongside a new CBBC reality show, S Club Search, which invited children to extend the S Club brand and audition to form a younger version of the band. The new group was to be chosen to sing with S Club 7 on Children in Need 2001 and go on tour with them on their future S Club 7 Carnival 2002 tour. The eight children who went on to form the band named themselves S Club Juniors and had six top ten UK hits.

The effects of the group's charity single, "Never Had a Dream Come True", were felt when the group handed over £200,000 to Children in Need, from the sales of the CD after the release of "Don't Stop Movin'" in April 2001. As a result, S Club 7 were invited back and asked to record a second consecutive Children in Need single, in November 2001. It was decided that "Have You Ever", a song co-written by Chris Braide and Cathy Dennis, was to be released for the charity campaign. After the success of the previous year's single, the performance on the night featured many primary school children who had pre-recorded their versions of the chorus, including S Club Juniors who made their first television appearance. The band felt "overjoyed" that they could, once again, contribute to the Children in Need campaign, feeling that it meant a lot to them to be involved and feeling privileged to be able to help; they also commented that it was nice for British school children to be involved in raising money for charity. The single was another success for the group and became their fourth number-one, as well as the 21st biggest selling single of 2001.

Following the release of "You", other tracks from the album were considered for a follow-up single, but those plans never materialized. Remixes for "Stronger" were sent to clubs and radio stations, indicating that it would be the follow-up single to "You", but the release was cancelled due to Cattermole's departure from the band. The EP was, however, released for the first time on streaming in January 2024 featuring five remixes with DJs such as Flip & Fill, Solar8 and ATFC.

== Departure ==
In January 2002, S Club 7 embarked upon their second arena tour, S Club 7 Carnival 2002, which aimed to please fans by stylising their songs to fit with a carnival-like theme with music styles from different countries of the world. Speaking about the tour, McIntosh described it as "older show", a change from S Club Party 2001, which was "more like bubblegum", with Paul Cattermole comparing 2001's "theatrical" tour with the Carnival tour as a more "glitzy, concert stage". The tour was generally well received by the children's media, describing the show as "diverse" and "dazzling", whereas the group was criticised by the broadsheets as being "like a compilation of toddler-friendly Eurovision entries" although conceding that it was a "slick, decent-value show". Cattermole was also criticised when he was dubbed overweight and a "heavy-footed dancer". After the success of their last three singles, all of which had made it to number-one, S Club 7 failed to top the charts when they released their ninth single, "You"; it reached number-two in the UK. The single, which was described as a "candyfloss-bright, tongue-in-cheek 50s pastiche", was to be Paul Cattermole's last single with the band and led the way for a series of events that was to unravel S Club 7's time at the top of the charts, which would ultimately cause the band to split.

Talking about his former musical venture three months before he left S Club 7, Paul Cattermole described the band—who had been called Skua—as having a "Limp Bizkit vibe" as well as comparing their style to Rage Against the Machine. Cattermole's resignation came as Skua had decided to reform, and he found it a perfect time to make the transition back from pop to rock as S Club 7's record contracts were up for renewal. Cattermole stayed with the band until June 2002, featuring in five out of thirteen episodes of the group's final television series, Viva S Club, and performing his final concert with the group for Party at the Palace, which was part of Queen Elizabeth II's Golden Jubilee celebrations.

Following Paul Cattermole's sudden death in 2023, S Club's reunion tour was renamed the Good Times tour, in memory of Cattermole, who was scheduled to perform the lead vocals for the track "Good Times" on tour. A new version of the song featuring Bradley McIntosh and Jon Lee on lead vocals was released on digital platforms on 7 March 2024, which is Cattermole's birthday. The song reached #51 on UK iTunes Singles and #20 on Irish iTunes Singles. The cover art features a picture of McIntosh and Lee with Cattermole.

== Track listing ==
International release
No.	Title	Writer(s)	Producer(s)	Length
1.	"Don't Stop Movin'"	Jo O'Meara; Paul Cattermole; Bradley McIntosh; Tina Barrett; Hannah Spearritt; Rachel Stevens; Jon Lee; Sheppard Solomon; Simon Ellis	Ellis; Stephen Lipson^{[a]}	3:53
2.	"Show Me Your Colours"	Anna-Lena Högdahl; David Eriksen	Eriksen	3:05
3.	"You"	Eliot Kennedy; Mike Percy; Tim Lever; Tim Woodcock	Steelworks; Lipson^{[a]}	3:26
4.	"Have You Ever"	Andrew Frampton; Cathy Dennis; Chris Braide	Lipson	3:20
5.	"Good Times"	Eddie Chacon; John Themis; Jonathan Shorten	Shorten	3:32
6.	"Boy Like You"	Dennis; Lauren Christy	Dennis; Eriksen; Oskar Paul	3:05
7.	"Sunshine"	Dennis; O'Meara; Cattermole; McIntosh; Barrett; Spearritt; Stevens; Lee; Yak Bondy	Dennis; Bondy	3:53
8.	"Dance, Dance, Dance"	Dennis; Julian Gingell; Barry Stone	Dennis; Jewels & Stone	3:47
9.	"It's Alright"	Kennedy; Percy; Lever; Woodcock	Steelworks	3:29
10.	"Stronger"	O'Meara; Cattermole; McIntosh; Barrett; Spearritt; Stevens; Lee; Ellis; Ryan Molloy	Ellis; Jewels & Stone^{[a]}	3:11
11.	"Summertime Feeling"	Adam Ryan Carter; Christine McVie; Mark Hadfield; Cattermole	Carter; Hadfield	3:15
12.	"I Will Find You"	McIntosh; Bondy	Bondy	3:47
13.	"Never Had a Dream Come True"	Dennis; Ellis	Dennis; Paul; Lipson^{[a]}	4:00

UK release
No.	Title	Writer(s)	Producer(s)	Length
11.	"Right Guy"	Dennis; McIntosh	Dennis; Bondy	3:42
12.	"Summertime Feeling"	Carter; McVie; Hadfield; Cattermole	Carter; Hadfield	3:15
13.	"I Will Find You"	McIntosh; Bondy	Bondy	3:47
14.	"Never Had a Dream Come True"	Dennis; Ellis	Dennis; Paul; Lipson^{[a]}	4:00
15.	"Don't Stop Movin'" (Jewels & Stone Radio Mix)	O'Meara; Cattermole; McIntosh; Barrett; Spearritt; Stevens; Lee; Solomon; Ellis	Ellis; Jewels & Stone^{[a]}	3:51

B-side songs
No.	Title	Writer(s)	Producer(s)	Length
16.	"Right Guy" (Original version^{[b]})	Dennis; McIntosh	Dennis	3:40
17.	"Dangerous"	Tim Laws	Laws	3:52
18.	"The Long and Winding Road"	John Lennon; Paul McCartney	Bondy	3:42

=== Notes ===
- ^{^[a]} Signifies an additional producer
- ^{^[b]} The original version of "Right Guy" has differences with the album version and was included on the UK releases for the Don't Stop Movin' single.

== Charts ==
=== Weekly charts ===
Weekly chart performance for Sunshine
Chart (2001–2002)	Peak position
Australian Albums (ARIA)	62
Canadian Albums (Nielsen SoundScan)	35
European Albums (European Albums Chart)	13
French Albums (SNEP)	112
German Albums (Offizielle Top 100)	36
Irish Albums (IRMA)	11
New Zealand Albums (RMNZ)	13
Scottish Albums (Official Charts)	3
Swedish Albums (Sverigetopplistan)	38
Swiss Albums (Schweizer Hitparade)	57
UK Albums (Official Charts)	3

2022 weekly chart performance for Sunshine
Chart (2022)	Position
UK Vinyl Albums	22

=== Year-end charts ===
2001 year-end chart performance for Sunshine
Chart (2001)	Position
UK Albums Chart	17

2002 year-end chart performance for Sunshine
Chart (2002)	Position
UK Albums Chart	71

== Certifications ==
Certifications for Sunshine
Region	Certification	Certified units/sales
Canada (Music Canada)	Gold	50,000^{^}
New Zealand (RMNZ)	Gold	7,500^{^}
United Kingdom (BPI)	3× Platinum	900,000^{‡}
Summaries
Europe (IFPI)	Platinum	1,000,000^{*}
^{*} Sales figures based on certification alone.^{^} Shipments figures based on certification alone.^{‡} Sales+streaming figures based on certification alone.
