= Seeing Double (2003 film) =

- Theatrical release poster
- Directed by: Nigel Dick
- Written by: Kim Fuller; Paul Alexander
- Produced by: Simon Fuller; Alan Barnette
- Starring: Tina Barrett; Jon Lee; Bradley McIntosh; Jo O'Meara; Hannah Spearritt; Rachel Stevens
- Cinematography: Joan Benet
- Edited by: Mark Henson
- Music by: Jim Meacock
- Production companies: Columbia Pictures; S Club Studios; 19 Entertainment
- Distributed by: Columbia Pictures
- Release dates: 11 April 2003 (United Kingdom); 7 October 2003 (United States)
- Running time: 91 minutes
- Country: United Kingdom
- Language: English
- Budget: £5 million
- Box office: £2.1 million (UK) $3.4 million

Seeing Double is a 2003 British musical-comedy film starring British pop-group, S Club. Written by Kim Fuller and Paul Alexander, and directed by Nigel Dick, the film mostly features songs from the group's album of the same name including "Don't Stop Movin'" and "Never Had a Dream Come True".

== Plot ==
The film opens at the fictional Eagle Peak castle in Hollywood, where evil scientist Victor Gaghan is creating his S Club clones. Meanwhile, the real S Club arrive in Barcelona for their last show of their whirlwind tour. After spending the day promoting and performing, the group get excited about having some time off, until their manager Alistair informs them that they will be leaving for Los Angeles at 7:00 A.M. the next morning. After the stressed-out group enter their hotel rooms, Alistair is abducted by Gaghan's assistant Susan Sealove.

The next morning, the members of S Club oversleep and awaken to find Alistair gone having been left with his bill. Instead of using a credit card that Rachel finds to pay the bill, they use it on pampering themselves and after going bankrupt, they see the cloned S Club performing live on TV at a nearby cafe. After the others become disturbed to discover that Alistair is managing their uncanny lookalikes, they all decide to quickly leave the hotel and fly to L.A., only to get arrested by the police for trying to run out on the hotel bill and allegedly impersonating S Club. In jail, they learn that the warden likes to dance and to escape, they sing "Don't Stop Movin'" and get to their friend Natalie. She helps them get to L.A. by disguising them as English football fans so that they can avoid getting arrested again by the Spanish police.

After failing to get close to their doubles during a live concert, they decide to switch out their Hannah, Rachel and Jon for their copies during a music video shoot. Hannah, Rachel and Jon see that the Bradley, Tina and Jo clones have no belly buttons, and are exposed to their rituals of showering together, constant rehearsals, eating strange synthetic food and being brainwashed during bedtime. During a CD signing session, Rachel attempts to warn a fan to call the police, only for Alistair to confiscate the signed CD and contact Gaghan, who sends his goons to capture them and take them to his lair.

Meanwhile, Bradley, Tina and Jo learn that the other members' clones are unaware of being clones themselves, and are surprised when these clones shed their ritualistic routine and enjoy simple pleasures of life for the first time, such as boomerang games, real food, drinks and sightseeing. Determined to find out who created the clones, Jo researches the internet and discovers that Gaghan, a former genetics professor who was fired for illegal cloning experiments, recently purchased S Club memorabilia online, including their underwear. When their friends fail to show up as planned after being captured by Gaghan's goons, Bradley, Tina and Jo realise that something is wrong and reveal to the other members' clones that they are copies, and urge them to overcome their programmed memories to figure out Gaghan's location. The clones make a breakthrough and remember their birthplace and Gaghan's location: Eagle Peak.

Formulating a plan to enact revenge on Gaghan for the cloning, Bradley, Tina and Jo arrive at Eagle Peak with their friends' clones and run into the real Hannah, Rachel and Jon, only to be caught by Alistair while trying to escape. While the Hannah, Rachel and Jon clones run into their groupmates outside and tell them the truth of their origins, Gaghan tells the originals that he is going to take over the world through music because celebrities attract more attention than politicians, before leaving Alistair to kill the group. The clones save the group by revealing that Alistair is a clone due to his own lack of belly button and rebelling against him.

In the dining area, S Club are alarmed at the clones Gaghan has created including clones of AC/DC's Angus Young, King of Rock & Roll Elvis Presley, Will Smith as Men In Black's Agent J, Victoria Beckham (as Posh Spice), Robbie Williams, Eminem, King of Pop Michael Jackson, Elton John, Madonna, George Michael, Pop Idol star Gareth Gates, and Groucho Marx (of the Marx Brothers), and encourage them to rebel against Gaghan for their own free will. Enraged at this, Gaghan initiates a self-destruct sequence of Eagle Peak, which threatens to kill S Club and the clones. Both S Clubs band together to save the clones and sing "Who Do You Think You Are?" whilst the Jackson clone stops Gaghan and Sealove from escaping in their helicopter, and the original group is able to stop the place from self-destructing as the clones escape. While they are alarmed by the fact that they have released a new batch of cloned pop acts into the world, clone Alistair suddenly appears and tries to kill them when suddenly the real Alistair knocks him out. Gaghan and Sealove are later arrested and the group wonder what to do with their clones when Alistair and Natalie remind them of their very busy schedules.

At the end, the real S Club are seen at the beach and the clones are taking their place. They have decided that the clones will take their place when they want a holiday, and the same vice versa (it is also mentioned that the clones are getting paid in boomerangs). Nearby, the Gates clone they rescued is seen flirting with Rachel.

== Cast ==
- Tina Barrett as Tina
- Jon Lee as Jon
- Bradley McIntosh as Bradley
- Jo O'Meara as Jo
- Hannah Spearritt as Hannah
- Rachel Stevens as Rachel
- David Gant as Victor Gaghan
- Joseph Adams as Alistair
- Cristina Piaget as Susan Sealove
- Meritxell Santamaria as Natalie
- Gareth Gates as Gareth Gates clone
- Hans Juergen Richter as Carlos
- Domingo Calvo as Desk sergeant
- Nigel Dick as Director
- Reg Wilson as Marcus

== Production ==
The film had three months to be filmed in. Jo O'Meara was suffering from intense back pains at the time, meaning she was unable to be fully active during film, with several running shots of her having to be performed by a body double. O'Meara also sat out during several dance routines, most noticeably during "Dance" where the scene had to be re-written after she was unable to perform the routine due to the back pains. During all routines in the film, O'Meara is seen sitting out of the routines, with the other five members performing the routine as a five-piece. Due to O'Meara's back pains, she did a lot of voice over work, but her body double performed the active actions, such as the scene where O'Meara is being chased by Alsatians.

== Box office ==
The film was released throughout the United Kingdom on 11 April 2003, after receiving its world premiere in London's Leicester Square. The film received large publicity during a 2003 tour S Club did, alongside S Club 8. The film was also released worldwide, where it became a success mainly in the United Kingdom, where it opened at the box office at No. 4.

The film marks the final appearance that S Club did with 19 Management which involved them acting. It also marked the movie debut of Gareth Gates.

== Critical reception ==
The film received negative reviews. Reception was positive from Shannon Nutt of DVD Talk. Neil Smith of the BBC criticized it as a “cynical, cheaply assembled caper".

== Home release ==
The film was released on DVD in the United Kingdom and United States as well as in Latin America, Spain, France, Ireland, Portugal, Italy, Germany, Greece, and Japan. The DVD went to number one in Spain and France. It made Top 10 in the U.S., U.K. & Ireland in the Children's DVD/Video Sales category. The DVD was re-released on 3 March 2008 in the UK, five years after its theatrical release. The re-released DVD maintained the same format as the previous one. After re-release, Seeing Double made the Children's Top 10 DVD Chart.

The S Club Seeing Double album has received BPI Platinum Certification as of November 2010.

== Television broadcasts ==
Seeing Double had its UK television premiere in 2005 when Channel 5 screened it at 6:05pm. The film achieved 1.1 million viewers, making it Five's most-watched children-based film. Both Sky One and Disney Channel UK subsequently showed the film. Disney Channel omitting the bloopers included in the film credits. It also aired in the Republic of Ireland on RTÉ2 and in India on HBO.
