= Nick Foster (composer) =

British composer, songwriter and music producer

- Born: UK
- Occupations: Composer, record producer, songwriter, arranger
- Instruments: Piano, synthesizer
- Years active: 2004–present
- Website: www.nickfostermusic.com

Nick Foster is a British composer, songwriter and music producer based in London. He is best-known for his work as a composer for television, commercials and film.

== Career ==
=== Music ===
Classically trained, Foster began his career in music as one half of the production/songwriting duo Dufflebag Boys (a.k.a. Rose and Foster), together with Mike Rose. They produced and wrote songs for Gary Barlow, S Club 7, S Club Juniors, East 17, 911, Lolly, Adam Rickitt, North & South, Precious, Roachford, Scooch, Boyzone, Eagle-Eye Cherry and Kylie Minogue.

=== Television and film ===
Foster's work includes Kayleigh Llewellyn's In My Skin (BBC), which won Best Drama at both the BAFTAS and the RTS Awards, Coky Giedroyc's feature musical based on the songs of Take That, Greatest Days, All or Nothing: Arsenal and ITV's animated family adventure series co-produced with Weta, Thunderbirds Are Go (written with his brother Ben Foster), for which they were nominated for a Bafta in 2016.

He has scored all of Derren Brown’s recent TV specials. His music also features in the Ryan Gosling / Michelle Williams film Blue Valentine, and in Raoul Martinez and Joshua Van Praag's Creating Freedom: Lottery of Birth, nominated for Best Documentary at Raindance Film Festival. In film, Foster has scored Sam Hobkinson’s feature documentary Misha and the Wolves, which premiered at Sundance in 2021. Previously, his work featured in Ryan Gosling's Blue Valentine and Creating Freedom - Lottery of Birth.

He also works as a composer of music for commercials; in this field his work has won numerous awards for original compositions including D&AD, Clio, Craft and MAS. He has worked with directors including Jonathan Glazer, Joachim Back, Wim Wenders and Nick Gordon.

Other TV work includes scores for entertainment shows including The Cube, Bigheads and Penn & Teller: Fool Us.

He has also been involved in various music education initiatives, most recently Bafta Kids' Big School Day, held at Alexandra Palace.

Silva Screen Records has to date released two volumes of Nick & Ben Foster's score for Thunderbirds Are Go, performed by the City of Prague Symphony Orchestra.

== Awards ==
- British Animation Award 2018 - Thunderbirds Are Go - nominated (with Ben Foster / Hackenbacker / Peacock Sound)
- BAFTA Craft Award 2016 - Best Music - Thunderbirds Are Go - nominated (with Ben Foster)
- MAS Award 2017 - Best Original Music for Television - Thunderbirds Are Go - nominated (with Ben Foster)
- Kinsale Sharks 2017 - Best Original Music for Commercial - Visa 'The Heart'
- BAFTA Craft Award 2013 - Derren Brown - Apocalypse
- BAFTA Craft Award 2012 - Derren Brown - The Secret of Luck - nominated
- BAFTA Craft Award 2011 – The Cube
- Gold Clio Best Original Music 2008 – Sony Walkman 'Music Pieces'
- D&AD winner Yellow Pencil Best Use Of Music 2008 – Sony Walkman 'Music Pieces'
- BTAA Awards 2008 : Best 60–90 Second TV Commercial (Gold) – Sony Walkman 'Music Pieces'
- BTA Craft Awards : Best Original Music 2007 – Ford “Own the Road Again”
- D&AD winner Yellow Pencil Best Use of Music 2006 – 3 Mobile "Tuperzik"

== Notable work ==
=== Television ===
- Thunderbirds Are Go - ITV 1 and CITV 2015–present (with Ben Foster)
- Derren Brown - The Push - Channel 4 / Netflix 2018
- Bounty Hunters - Cave Bear / Sky One 2017–present (with Ben Foster)
- Timewasters - Big Talk / ITV2 2017–present (with Oli Julian)
- Penn & Teller : Fool Us – The CW 2015–present
- Hospital People - BBC One 2017 (with Oli Julian)
- Bigheads - ITV / Primal Media 2017
- Hank Zipzer's Christmas Catastrophe - CBBC 2016
- Derren Brown - Twisted Tales - Vaudeville / Channel Four 2016
- The Code - BBC One 2016
- Hank Zipzer - Kindle / BBC 2013-16
- Stand Up To Cancer - Channel Four 2014
- Puppy Love - BBC Four 2014
- BBC Commonwealth Games 2014 (with Peter Raeburn)
- Bad Robots - Objective / E4 2014
- Crowd Rules - CNBC 2016
- The Great Art Robbery - Channel Four 2013
- The Cube - Objective / ITV 2009-15
- The Job - Embassy Row / CBS 2013
- Derren Brown - Apocalypse - Objective / Channel Four 2012 (with Ben Foster)
- Beauty & The Beast - Betty / Channel Four 2012
- It's Not What You Know - Grenada / ITV 2008
- ITV1 on-screen identities 2006–14 (with Peter Raeburn)
- Derren Brown - Placebo / The Experiments / Miracles For Sale - Objective / Channel Four
- Hero at 30,000 Feet - Objective / Channel Four
- Rocket's Island - Lime Pictures / CBBC (with Oli Julian)

=== Film ===
- Misha And The Wolves - 2021 dir. Sam Hobkinson
- Blue Valentine – "At The Drop of The Day" (composition with Matt Sweeney & Peter Raeburn) - 2011 dir. Derek Cianfrance
- Creating Freedom: Lottery of Birth (additional music) - 2013 dir. Raoul Martinez / Joshua Van Praag
- Molly Moon and the Incredible Book of Hypnotism (additional music) - 2015 dir. Christopher N. Rowley
