= Sheppard Solomon =

American songwriter (born 1969)

- Born: December 12, 1969 (age 56); New York City, New York, U.S.
- Occupation: Songwriter
- Writing career
- Genres: Pop, rock, R&B
- Notable works: Daughtry - "Feels Like Tonight"; Paris Hilton - "Stars Are Blind"; Ryan Cabrera - "True"; Kelly Clarkson - "I Hate Myself for Losing You"; Britney Spears - "Touch of My Hand"; Enrique Iglesias - "Not in Love"; Celine Dion - "Right in Front of You"

Sheppard J. "Shep" Solomon (born December 12, 1969) is an American songwriter from New York City.

== Biography ==
Solomon attended the Fiorello H. LaGuardia High School of Music & Art and Performing Arts in New York City. Upon graduation, he formed two bands, which were signed to EMI and SIRE respectively. During this time, Sheppard co-wrote material with other songwriters. His first hit co-write was Eternal's 1993 UK chart hit "Just a Step from Heaven".

Solomon decided to focus on songwriting full-time and went on to contribute to 14 top 3 single positions in the United Kingdom and Europe, including his second UK number-one single co-write, "Don't Stop Movin'" by S Club 7. This single also secured a Brit Award for Best British Single.

Solomon returned to songwriting in the United States, co-writing cuts with artists such as Britney Spears, Kelly Clarkson, Celine Dion, and Enrique Iglesias. He then went on to co-write Ryan Cabrera's "True"

Solomon co-wrote the song "Shiver" for Natalie Imbruglia which went on to be a #1 Pan-European airplay hit and co-wrote Paris Hilton's first single "Stars Are Blind" which was a worldwide top #5 single.

In 2011, Solomon contributed to releases such as Wonderland's "Not a Love Song" (Mercury UK), One Direction's "Tell Me a Lie" (Syco UK) and J-Lo's "Everybody's Girl" from the Love Album (Island Def Jam).

To date, Sheppard has written or co-written and released 140 songs.

== Discography ==
Year	Artist	Album	Track(s)	Credits	Chart Position
2017	Dash Berlin Feat. Arjay and Jonah				
2016	Schiller	Future	"Sweet Symphony" "Little Earthquakes" "Save Me a Day"	Writing, Vocals	#1 Germany
2015	Lorenzo Jovanotti	Lorenzo 2015 CC	"E' La Scienza, Bellezza!" "Insleme" "Il Cielo Imenso" "7Millardi"	Writing	#1 Italy
2013	98 Degrees	2.0	"Impossible Things"	Writing	
2011	One Direction	Up All night	"Tell Me A Lie"	Writing, Production	
2011	Hitomi	Spirit	"Rollin Wit Da Homies" Feat. Rivers Cuomo	Writing	
2011	Wonderland	Wonderland	"Not A Love Song"	Writing	#22 Ireland
2010	Miranda Cosgrove	Sparks Fly	"Disgusting"	Writing	
2009	Casie Davis	Differently	"Don't Wanna Dance"	Writing	
2009	Gary Go	Gary Go	"Life Gets In The Way"	Writing	Top 20 UK
2009	Natalie Imbruglia	Come to Life	"Twenty"	Writing	Top 100 Aus ARIA
2008	Human Nature	A Symphony of hits	"Cruel"	Writing	#10 Australia
2008	Gary Go	Gary Go	"Engines"	Writing	
2006	3am feat. Tracey Cole	Stars Are Blind	"Stars Are Blind Remix"	Writing	
2006	LeAnn Rimes	Whatever We Wanna	"Satisfied"	Writing	#15 UK
2006	365	One Touch	"That Thing"	Writing	
2006	Paris Hilton	Paris	"Stars Are Blind"	Writing, Production	#18 US #11 EU
2006	Paris Hilton	Paris	"Stars Are Blind"	Writing, Production	#12 US Dance
2006	Chris Daughtry	Daughtry	"Feels Like Tonight"	Writing	#24 US
2005	Tony Monaco	Euromix 11	"Do You Know"	Writing	
2005	Roland Belmares	The Midori Mix 2005	"Without Love"	Writing	
2005	Sofia Essaîdi	Mon Caberet	"Mon Caberet"	Writing	
2005	Natalie Imbruglia	Counting Down the Days	"Shiver"	Writing	#8 UK
2004	Enrique Iglesias	7	"Not In Love"	Writing	#35 US #5 UK
2004	Aneta Langerova	Spousta	"Spousta Andělů"	Writing	
2004	Ryan Cabrera	Take It All Away	"Exit to Exit"	Writing	
2004	D-Side	Stronger Together	"Speechless"	Writing	
2004	Various	Ministry of Sound	"Do you know"	Writing	
2004	Kelly Clarkson	Breakaway	"I Hate Myself for Losing you"	Writing	#3 US
2004	Angel City		"Do You Know (I Go crazy)"	Writing	#8 UK
2003	Soda Pop		"It Must Be Love"	Writing	#45 Belgium
2003	Becky Baeling	Becstasy	"Getaway"	Writing	
2003	Liberty X	Being Somebody	"Impossible"	Writing	
2003	Blue (5)	Guilty	"Rock The Night"	Writing	
2003	Ryan Cabrera	Take It All Away	"True"	Writing	#18 US
2003	S Club 8		"Don't Stop Moving 'til Sundown (Bimbo Jones Bootie remix)"	Writing	
2003	Britney Spears	In The Zone	"Touch of My Hand"	Writing	
2003	Pnau		"Una Noche" Feat Kid Creole	Writing	
2002	Louise	Finest moments	"The Best Thing That you bring"	Writing	
2002	Alice Martineau	Daydreams	"Breathe Tonight"	Writing	
2002	S Club	Seeing Double	"Love Ain't Gonna Wait for You"	Writing	#2 UK
2002	S Club	Seeing Double	"Alive"	Writing	#5 UK
2002	Lisa Loeb	Cake and Pie	"We Could Still Belong Together"	Writing	
2002	Celine Dion	A New Day Has Come	"Right in Front of You"	Writing	
2002	Kristine Blond		"A Day Without You"	Writing	
2001	More Than a Feeling		"You"	Writing	
2001	Brigit	Few Like Me	"I Own you"	Writing	
2001	Eric Gales	That's What I Am	"She Shines"	Writing	
2001	Aurora	Aurora	"Dreaming"	Writing	#25 UK
2001	S Club 7	Sunshine	"Don't Stop Movin'"	Writing	#1 UK #1 EU
2000	ATC	A Touch of Class	"Mistake No. 2"	Writing	
2000	Precious		"Rewind"	Writing	#11 UK
2000	Mero	It Must be Love	"It Must be Love"	Writing	#30 UK
2000	Melissa		"Bulletproof"	Writing	
1999	Blaque Ivory	Blaque	"When the last teardrop Falls"	Writing	
1999	Human Nature	Counting Down	"Cruel"	Writing	#1 Aus
1999	Various	Teaching Mrs Tingle (Original Motion picture Soundtrack)	"'Til I Cry you out of Me"	Writing	
1999	Tal Bachman	Tal Bachman	"Darker Side of Blue"	Writing	
1998	K Klass	Live It Up	"Live It Up"	Writing	
1997	Robin S	From Now On	"24 hour Love"	Production	
1996	Nu Colours	Nu Colours	"Tomorrow Love"	Writing	
