= The Record of the Year =

- Country: United Kingdom
- First award: 1998
- Final award: 2012

Television/radio coverage
- Network: ITV (1998–2005)

The Record of the Year was an award voted by the United Kingdom public. For many years it was given in conjunction with a television programme on ITV of the same name.

The award began in 1998 and was televised on ITV for eight years before being dropped in 2006 after disagreements over the phone voting element. Since then, it had been an online poll, administered through the Record of the Year website. In 2013, the online poll was axed, signaling the end of the award. It became one of the highest rated music TV ceremonies in the UK, boosting sales of CDs and then downloads in the crucial fortnight before Christmas every year. For that reason, it was much respected by the industry, labels, publishers and retailers. It was the only music award in the UK to be chosen by the public.

== Format ==
At the beginning of December, a shortlist of twenty (later extended to thirty) songs were decided by an expert industry panel and showcased in a preview programme, with the public then invited to choose their favourite by phone vote, and the ten songs with the most votes advanced to the live show the following week.

The live show, held on a Saturday just before Christmas, was split into two parts. In the first part, the ten songs were represented as either live performances or pre-recorded performances via satellite if the artist was unable to travel to the UK and on some occasions, if a performance of any kind was not possible, the song was represented by an airing of its music video. After all of the songs had been presented, the phone lines were opened and in later years, voting was also conducted by both online and text message. In the second part, aired around one or two hours later, the results of the vote were announced with each ITV region represented by its own spokesperson to announce the results of their local area. The artist with the most votes was declared the winner and received the trophy before performing their winning song again to close the programme.

== Winners ==
The most frequent winner was Irish boy band Westlife, with four awards (1999, 2000, 2003 and 2005), two of which were consecutive. The only other artist to win multiple awards was American singer Lady Gaga, with two awards (2009 and 2011).

The 2008 winner, "Rockstar" by Canadian band Nickelback, was the first winner from North America.

The only artist to receive multiple nominations in the same year was American rapper Pitbull, who was nominated as both a lead and featured artist in 2011, although he never won.

Year	Song	Artist	Host
1998	"No Matter What"	Boyzone	Denise Van Outen
1999	"Flying Without Wings"	Westlife	Denise Van Outen
2000	"My Love"	Westlife	Denise Van Outen
2001	"Don't Stop Movin'"	S Club 7	Ant & Dec
2002	"Unchained Melody"	Gareth Gates	Ant & Dec
2003	"Mandy"	Westlife	Cat Deeley
2004	"Thunderbirds Are Go"	Busted	Cat Deeley
2005	"You Raise Me Up"	Westlife	Vernon Kay
2006	"Patience"	Take That	—N/a
2007	"Bleeding Love"	Leona Lewis	—N/a
2008	"Rockstar"	Nickelback	—N/a
2009	"Poker Face"	Lady Gaga	—N/a
2010	"Fireflies"	Owl City	—N/a
2011	"Born This Way"	Lady Gaga	—N/a
2012	"Somebody That I Used to Know"	Gotye feat. Kimbra	—N/a

== Results by year ==
=== 1998 ===
The first Record of the Year took place on 12 December 1998 and presented by Denise van Outen. The ten finalists were:

Song	Artist	Result
"No Matter What"	Boyzone	1st - 276,741 votes
"My Heart Will Go On"	Celine Dion	2nd - 135,648 votes
"Angels"	Robbie Williams	3rd - 117,365 votes
"One for Sorrow"	Steps	4th - 106,506 votes
"Believe"	Cher	5th - 91,565 votes
"Got the Feelin'"	5ive	6th - 80,953 votes
"C'est la Vie"	B*Witched	7th - 67,076 votes
"How Do I Live"	LeAnn Rimes	8th - 44,597 votes
"Never Ever"	All Saints	9th - 42,522 votes
"Feel It"	The Tamperer featuring Maya	10th - 37,543 votes

=== 1999 ===
The second Record of the Year took place on 11 December 1999 and presented by Denise van Outen. The ten finalists were:

Song	Artist	Notes
"Flying Without Wings"	Westlife	1st - 159,900 votes
"...Baby One More Time"	Britney Spears	3rd - 73,841 votes
"Blue (Da Ba Dee)"	Eiffel 65	6th - 62,335 votes
"Bring It All Back"	S Club 7	7th - 58,422 votes
"If You Had My Love"	Jennifer Lopez	10th - 37,569 votes
"Livin' la Vida Loca"	Ricky Martin	5th - 65,101 votes
"Mambo No. 5"	Lou Bega	8th - 58,120 votes
"Perfect Moment"	Martine McCutcheon	9th - 55,365 votes
"That Don't Impress Me Much"	Shania Twain	4th - 69,727 votes
"When You Say Nothing at All"	Ronan Keating	2nd - 150,669 votes

=== 2000 ===
The third Record of the Year took place on 9 December 2000 and presented by Denise van Outen. In a change to the first two years, the votes that each song received from each region were converted into a points value (e.g. the least voted song received 1 point, and the highest voted song received 10 points). The ten finalists were:

Song	Artist	Result
"My Love"	Westlife	1st - 129 points
"Rock DJ"	Robbie Williams	2nd - 121 points
"Reach"	S Club 7	3rd - 114 points
"Life Is a Rollercoaster"	Ronan Keating	4th - 103 points
"Fill Me In"	Craig David	5th - 84 points
"It Feels So Good"	Sonique	6th - 71 points
"Pure Shores"	All Saints	7th - 60 points
"Rise"	Gabrielle	8th - 34 points
"Gotta Tell You"	Samantha Mumba	9th - 29 points
"Groovejet (If This Ain't Love)"	Spiller feat. Sophie Ellis-Bextor	10th - 25 points

=== 2001 ===
The fourth Record of the Year took place on 8 December 2001. Ant & Dec presented the show for the first time. For the first time, in addition to the regional phone vote, viewers could cast their vote online, the result of which was announced as an individual set of points. The ten finalists were:

Song	Artist	Result
"Don't Stop Movin'"	S Club 7	1st - 139 points
"All Rise"	Blue	2nd - 135 points
"Can't Get You Out of My Head"	Kylie Minogue	3rd - 124 points
"Pure and Simple"	Hear'Say	4th - 109 points
"Whole Again"	Atomic Kitten	5th - 82 points
"Teenage Dirtbag"	Wheatus	6th - 81 points
"It Wasn't Me"	Shaggy	7th - 62 points
"Survivor"	Destiny's Child	8th - 38 points
"Perfect Gentleman"	Wyclef Jean	9th - 36 points
"Do You Really Like It?"	DJ Pied Piper and the Masters of Ceremonies	10th - 19 points

=== 2002 ===
The fifth Record of the Year took place on 7 December 2002 and presented by Ant & Dec. The results format was changed from this year onwards, the five songs with the lowest votes were eliminated from the scoreboard and only the top five songs went forward to receive points from the regional vote. Text message voting was also introduced this year; like the online vote the previous year, these results had their own individual set of points awarded. The ten finalists were:

Song	Artist	Notes
"Unchained Melody"	Gareth Gates	Todd Duncan cover
"A Little Less Conversation"	Elvis vs. JXL	Remix of Elvis's 1968 song
"Colourblind"	Darius	
"Evergreen"	Will Young	Westlife cover
"Hero"	Enrique Iglesias	
"If Tomorrow Never Comes"	Ronan Keating	Garth Brooks cover
"Just a Little"	Liberty X	
"Kiss Kiss"	Holly Valance	Cover of "Şımarık" by Tarkan, based on a previous cover by Stella Soleil
"The Tide Is High (Get the Feeling)"	Atomic Kitten	Cover of "The Tide Is High" by the Paragons
"Whenever, Wherever"	Shakira	

=== 2003 ===
The sixth Record of the Year took place on 6 December 2003. Ant & Dec were unable to return as hosts due to their commitments presenting Pop Idol; and the pair were replaced as hosts by Cat Deeley. The ten finalists were:

Song	Artist	Notes
"Mandy"	Westlife	Cover of "Brandy" by Scott English
"Be Faithful"	Fatman Scoop	
"Bring Me to Life"	Evanescence	
"Crazy in Love"	Beyoncé feat. Jay-Z	
"If You're Not the One"	Daniel Bedingfield	
"Make Luv"	Room 5 feat. Oliver Cheatham	
"Sweet Dreams My LA Ex"	Rachel Stevens	
"Where Is the Love?"	The Black Eyed Peas	
"White Flag"	Dido	
"Year 3000"	Busted	

=== 2004 ===
The seventh Record of the Year took place on 4 December 2004 and was hosted by Cat Deeley. The ten finalists were:

Song	Artist	Result
"Thunderbirds Are Go"	Busted	1st – 92pts
"5 Colours in Her Hair"	McFly	2nd – 91pts
"Left Outside Alone"	Anastacia	3rd – 90pts
"Leave Right Now"	Will Young	4th – 88pts
"The Closest Thing to Crazy"	Katie Melua	5th – 79pts
"Laura"	Scissor Sisters	
"Love Machine"	Girls Aloud	
"Real to Me"	Brian McFadden	
"These Words"	Natasha Bedingfield	
"This Love"	Maroon 5	

=== 2005 ===
The eighth Record of the Year took place on 10 December 2005 and was hosted by Vernon Kay. The text message vote was incorporated into the regional vote for this year. It would prove to be the final year in which a television show was held to determine the winner of the award. The ten finalists were:

Song	Artist	Result	Notes
"You Raise Me Up"	Westlife	1st	Secret Garden cover
"All About You"	McFly	2nd	
"My Humps"	The Black Eyed Peas	3rd	
"You're Beautiful"	James Blunt	4th	
"Bad Day"	Daniel Powter	5th	
"Feel Good Inc."	Gorillaz feat. De La Soul		
"If There's Any Justice"	Lemar		
"Nine Million Bicycles"	Katie Melua		
"Since U Been Gone"	Kelly Clarkson		
"What You Waiting For?"	Gwen Stefani		

=== 2006 ===
The result was:

Song	Artist	Result
"Patience"	Take That	1st 15.5%
"Hips Don't Lie"	Shakira feat. Wyclef Jean	2nd 15.3%
"No Tomorrow"	Orson	3rd 14.9%
"Maneater"	Nelly Furtado	4th 10.8%
"Crazy"	Gnarls Barkley	5th 10.6%
"I Don't Feel Like Dancin'"	Scissor Sisters	6th 10.4%
"From Paris to Berlin"	Infernal	
"I Wish I Was a Punk Rocker (With Flowers in My Hair)"	Sandi Thom	
"Smile"	Lily Allen	
"SOS"	Rihanna	

=== 2007 ===
The result was:

Song	Artist	Result	Notes
"Bleeding Love"	Leona Lewis	1st 24.2%	
"Shine"	Take That	2nd 20.2%	
"Grace Kelly"	Mika	3rd 19.3%	
"Hey There Delilah"	Plain White T's	4th 13.3%	
"Umbrella"	Rihanna	5th 12.8%	
"How to Save a Life"	The Fray	6th 3.6%	
"Beautiful Liar"	Beyoncé & Shakira	7th 3.5%	
"The Way I Are"	Timbaland feat. Keri Hilson & D.O.E.	8th 1.2%	
"Ruby"	Kaiser Chiefs	9th 1.1%	
"500 Miles (I'm Gonna Be)"	The Proclaimers feat. Brian Potter and Andy Pipkin	10th 0.8%	Comic Relief rerecording of the Proclaimers' 1988 song

=== 2008 ===
The result was:

Song	Artist	Notes	Result
"Rockstar"	Nickelback		1st 20.3%
"4 Minutes"	Madonna featuring Justin Timberlake and Timbaland		2nd 19.8%
"Mercy"	Duffy		3rd 11.9%
"I Kissed a Girl"	Katy Perry		4th 10.5%
"American Boy"	Estelle featuring Kanye West		5th 10.4%
"Viva la Vida"	Coldplay		6th 10.3%
"Chasing Pavements"	Adele		7th 4.9%
"Take a Bow"	Rihanna		8th 4.7%
"Now You're Gone"	Basshunter and DJ Mental Theo's Bazzheadz	Remake of Basshunter's song "Boten Anna"	9th 3.9%
"Hero"	The X Factor finalists	Mariah Carey cover	10th 3.3%

=== 2009 ===
The result was:

Song	Artist	Result
"Poker Face"	Lady Gaga	1st 20.6%
"Use Somebody"	Kings of Leon	2nd 13.9%
"Fight for This Love"	Cheryl Cole	3rd 12.2%
"I Gotta Feeling"	The Black Eyed Peas	4th 11.1%
"The Fear"	Lily Allen	5th 10.6%
"Bonkers"	Dizzee Rascal feat. Armand van Helden	6th 10.5%
"In for the Kill"	La Roux	7th 10.1%
"Number 1"	Tinchy Stryder feat. N-Dubz	8th 4.6%
"Broken Strings"	James Morrison feat. Nelly Furtado	9th 3.5%
"Sexy Chick"	David Guetta feat. Akon	10th 2.8%

=== 2010 ===
The result was:

Song	Artist	Result
"Fireflies"	Owl City	1st 21.7%
"Telephone"	Lady Gaga feat. Beyoncé	2nd 13.7%
"Empire State of Mind (Part II)"	Alicia Keys	3rd 13.0%
"Just The Way You Are (Amazing)"	Bruno Mars	4th 11.8%
"Love the Way You Lie"	Eminem feat. Rihanna	5th 10.9%
"California Gurls"	Katy Perry feat. Snoop Dogg	6th 10.0%
"Pass Out"	Tinie Tempah	7th 9.3%
"We No Speak Americano"	Yolanda Be Cool & DCUP	8th 6.9%
"Airplanes"	B.o.B. feat. Hayley Williams	9th 2.3%
"OMG"	Usher feat. will.i.am	10th 0.4%

=== 2011 ===
The result was:

Song	Artist	Result
"Born This Way"	Lady Gaga	1st 38.2%
"Someone Like You"	Adele	2nd 19.8%
"The A Team"	Ed Sheeran	3rd 14.4%
"Moves Like Jagger"	Maroon 5 feat. Christina Aguilera	4th 9.6%
"Price Tag"	Jessie J	5th 6.4%
"Grenade"	Bruno Mars	6th 3.7%
"Party Rock Anthem"	LMFAO	7th 3.6%
"S&M"	Rihanna	8th 2.3%
"On the Floor"	Jennifer Lopez feat. Pitbull	9th 1.9%
"Give Me Everything"	Pitbull feat. Ne-Yo, Afrojack and Nayer	10th 0.3%

=== 2012 ===
The result was:

Song	Artist	Result
"Somebody That I Used To Know"	Gotye feat. Kimbra	1st 18.5%
"Call Me Maybe"	Carly Rae Jepsen	2nd 17.4%
"Gangnam Style"	Psy	2nd 17.4%
"Titanium"	David Guetta feat. Sia	3rd 10.9%
"We Are Young"	fun. feat. Janelle Monáe	4th 10.3%
"Starships"	Nicki Minaj	5th 6.5%
"Next To Me"	Emeli Sandé	6th 6.3%
"Payphone"	Maroon 5 feat. Wiz Khalifa	7th 5.4%
"Domino"	Jessie J	8th 3.9%
"Whistle"	Flo Rida	9th 3.7%

== Criticism and praise ==
Many have criticised the 'Record of the Year' Award, as they feel the nominations are unfairly dominated by pop acts and thus the winner is usually not the "true" record of the year. One suggested reason for this is that it is done to attract young girls, who the organisers are sure will watch the televised final and vote for the records. Others have argued that it is an attempt to boost the sales of pop artists' albums, which traditionally have limited success relative to their singles, in the crucial pre-Christmas period. Of the examples cited as evidence for this, the most famous include the exclusion of rap artist Eminem's "My Name Is..." in 1999 as he was unavailable to perform live on the Record of the Year final and the omission from nominations of rock act The Darkness's track "I Believe in a Thing Called Love" in 2003 despite being one of the highest selling singles of the year.

In spite of this, many winners of the award, as well as the organisers, argue its significance and integrity on the basis that it represents the views of the public, rather than critics. It inspired Simon Cowell to get into television and he attributes the show for his entry into the media. The writer and director Richard Curtis, who is the founder of Comic Relief, also cited Gareth Gates' win of the 2002 award as the deciding factor in asking him to record the following year's Red Nose Day single for the charity. Some may argue this is not entirely a good thing. However, it always gets massive ratings. Indeed, Westlife have often said that their first win for the single "Flying Without Wings" was the most exciting moment in their career.

Unsurprisingly, critics eventually began to say that it was just an award to prove Westlife were still around, hence why Heat Magazine dubbed it "Westlife Record of the Year" in 2004. However, a counter-argument is that this, and similar awards based on phone polls, are a true representation of public opinion, a possibly better indication than sales, which calls BBC Radio 1's countdown of the 20 best selling singles of the last calendar year a more accurate indication of the record of the year. Still, the chosen tracks on the televised Record of the Year contest reflect the views of the television programme viewers only, and not necessarily the music-buying public at large, who might not phone in multiple times to vote for their favourite song. In contrast, the Radio 1 end-of-year chart includes all music sales in all formats.

== Sponsorship ==
Below is a list of companies that have sponsored the award since it began:

- 1998–2001: Britannia Music
- 2002–2005: T-Mobile

== Theme music ==
From 1998 to 2004, the theme music was the club track "Disco Cop" by Blue Adonis. In 2005, ITV used a specially recorded track.
