= Natural (S Club 7 song) =

2000 single by S Club 7

- UK CD1 cover

Single by S Club 7

from the album 7
- B-side: "If It's Love"
- Released: 11 September 2000
- Length: 3:14 (single version); 3:22 (album version)
- Label: Polydor; 19
- Songwriters: Norma Ray; Jean Fredenucci; Cathy Dennis; Andrew Todd
- Producers: Cathy Dennis; Phil Bodger

S Club 7 singles chronology
"Reach" (2000)	"Natural" (2000)	"Never Had a Dream Come True" (2000)

Audio sample
- file; help

Music video
- "Natural" on YouTube

"Natural" is a song by English pop group S Club 7. It was released on 11 September 2000 as the second single from their second studio album 7 (2000). The track was written by Norma Ray, Jean Fredenucci, Cathy Dennis, and Andrew Todd. It is an English cover of Ray's 1999 hit "Tous les maux d'amour", both of which interpolate Gabriel Fauré's Pavane. Upon the song's release, it peaked at number three in the United Kingdom and reached the top 50 in Australia, Germany, and Ireland.

== Song information ==
"Natural", S Club 7's fifth single, features Rachel Stevens on lead vocals. It describes love for an individual as a natural occurrence. There are three different versions of the song. The album version, included on the original release of 7, features a R&B style production. The single version is mixed with heavier pop music themes, including the use of a vocoder, and the male vocals are more predominant. The video version is identical to the single version, except it features extra adlib vocals from Rachel.

== Music video ==
S Club sitting around the campfire at the end of the music video. (Left - Right) Barrett, McIntosh, Stevens, Cattermole, Spearritt, Lee and O'Meara.

The official music video, directed by Andy Morahan, features the group on a tropical beach. The video progresses to show the men fish in the water as the women observe from the beach while sunbathing. The video was filmed and directed in Malibu.

== Track listings ==
UK CD1

1. "Natural" (single version) – 3:14
2. "Natural" (Crash & Burn mix) – 5:56
3. "Natural" (Full Crew mix) – 3:40
4. "Natural" (CD-ROM)

UK CD2

1. "Natural" (single version) – 3:14
2. "If It's Love" – 4:08
3. "You're My Number One" (Almighty mix) – 10:44
4. Picture gallery (CD-ROM)

UK cassette single

1. "Natural" (single version) – 3:14
2. "If It's Love" – 4:08

US CD single

1. "Natural" (Spike mix)
2. 7 album snippets

French CD single

1. "Natural" (Route 66 Slow n'Low mix) – 3:54
2. "Natural" (Full Crew mix edit) – 3:38
3. "Natural" (single version) – 3:14

Australian CD1

1. "Natural" (single version) – 3:14
2. "Natural" (Crash & Burn mix) – 5:58
3. "Natural" (Full Crew mix edit) – 3:40
4. "Spiritual Love" – 3:51
5. "Natural" (CD-ROM enhanced video)

Australian CD2

1. "Natural" (single version) – 3:14
2. "If It's Love" – 4:08
3. "You're My Number One" (Almighty mix) – 10:44
4. "Stand by You" – 3:03
5. Picture gallery (CD-ROM)
- Digital single
1. "Natural" (Single Version) – 3:14
2. "If It's Love" – 4:08
3. "Natural" (Crash & Burn remix) – 5:57
4. "Natural" (Crash & Burn remix radio edit) – 3:11
5. "Natural" (Full Crew mix) – 4:57
6. "Natural" (Full Crew mix edit) – 3:39
7. "Natural" (Sharp Boys club vocal) – 7:00
8. "Natural" (Sharp Boys Prance dub) – 6:57
9. "Natural" (Almighty mix) – 7:21
10. "Natural" (Route 66 Slow 'n' Low remix) – 3:56

== Credits and personnel ==
Credits are lifted from the UK CD1 liner notes and the 7 album booklet.

Studio

- Mastered at Transfermation (London, England)

Personnel

- Norma Ray – writing ("Tous les maux d'amour")
- Jean Fredenucci – writing ("Tous les maux d'amour")
- Cathy Dennis – writing, keyboards, production
- Andrew Todd – writing
- Gus Isidore – guitars
- Yak Bondy – keyboards, drums, programming
- Kate St John – cor anglais
- Absolute – all other instruments, co-production
- Phil Bodger – production
- Dave Way – additional production, mixing
- Mark "Spike" Stent – mixing (single version)
- Jan "Stan" Kybert – mixing assistant and Pro Tools (single version)
- Aaron Pratley – mix engineering (single version)
- Thom Russo – editing
- Noel Summerville – mastering
- Richard Dowling – mastering

== Charts ==
=== Weekly charts ===
Chart (2000)	Peak position
Australia (ARIA)	45
Belgium (Ultratip Bubbling Under Wallonia)	2
Europe (Eurochart Hot 100)	17
France (SNEP)	67
Germany (GfK)	42
Ireland (IRMA)	17
Scotland Singles (OCC)	7
Switzerland (Schweizer Hitparade)	64
UK Singles (OCC)	3
UK Airplay (Music Week)	30

=== Year-end charts ===
Chart (2000)	Position
UK Singles (OCC)	122

== Release history ==
Region	Date	Format(s)	Label(s)	Ref.
United Kingdom	11 September 2000	2× CD; cassette	Polydor	
United States	31 October 2000	Contemporary hit radio	Interscope; Polydor	
New Zealand	27 November 2000	2× CD	Polydor	
Australia	8 January 2001	CD: CD1	Polydor	
Australia	26 February 2001	CD: CD2	Polydor	
