= Say Goodbye (S Club song) =

2003 single by S Club 7

Single by S Club

from the album Best: The Greatest Hits of S Club 7
- A-side: "Love Ain't Gonna Wait for You"
- B-side: "Special Kind of Something"; "Bittersweet"
- Released: 26 May 2003
- Length: 3:58
- Label: Polydor; 19
- Songwriters: Cathy Dennis; Chris Braide
- Producer: Stephen Lipson

S Club singles chronology
"Alive" (2002)	"Say Goodbye" / "Love Ain't Gonna Wait for You" (2003)	"These Are the Days" (2023)

Audio sample
- file; help

Music video
- "Say Goodbye" on YouTube

"Say Goodbye" is a song by British pop music group S Club, released as a single from the compilation Best: The Greatest Hits of S Club 7. The final single released before the band's split, it was released on 26 May 2003 as a double A-side with "Love Ain't Gonna Wait for You" in the United Kingdom and Australia; in other territories, it was issued alone. The single includes the B-side "Special Kind of Something", a cover of the song by British singer-songwriter Kavana.

== Music video ==
The music video showed the group packing up their things into boxes as if they are moving out of the house. While doing this, they look at photographs taken during their performances, photoshoots, as well as other events that they had experienced, and they sit together in the living room where they watch their past music videos on their TV. When everything is packed up, the group finally gather together in the living room to say goodbyes for a final time. The video then shows all the rooms empty until settling on a final shot of the empty living room, indicating that they have left.

== Track listings ==
- UK CD1 and Australasian CD single
1. "Say Goodbye"
2. "Love Ain't Gonna Wait for You" (single remix)
3. "Special Kind of Something"
4. "Say Goodbye" (video)
5. Goodbye messages from Rachel, Tina and Bradley (video)
- UK CD2
1. "Say Goodbye"
2. "Bittersweet"
3. "Love Ain't Gonna Wait for You" (video)
4. Goodbye messages from Jon, Jo and Hannah (video)
- UK cassette single
1. "Say Goodbye"
2. "Love Ain't Gonna Wait for You" (Illicit vocal mix)
- European CD single
1. "Say Goodbye"
2. "Love Ain't Gonna Wait for You" (radio version)
- Digital single
1. "Say Goodbye"
2. "Special Kind of Something"
3. "Bittersweet"
4. "Love Ain't Gonna Wait for You" (single remix)
5. "Love Ain't Gonna Wait for You" (Illicit vocal mix)
6. "Love Ain't Gonna Wait for You" (Illicit dub mix)
7. "Love Ain't Gonna Wait for You" (Bimbo Jones club mix)
8. "Love Ain't Gonna Wait for You" (Harry's Afro Hut 'Going Down' mix)

== Credits and personnel ==
Credits are lifted from the UK CD1 liner notes.

Studios

- Engineered and mixed at The Aquarium (London, England)
- Mastered at Transfermation (London, England)

Personnel

- Cathy Dennis – writing
- Chris Braide – writing
- John Themis – guitar
- Stephen Lipson – all other instruments, programming, production
- Nick Ingman – string arrangement, conducting
- Gavyn Wright – concertmaster
- Isobel Griffiths Ltd. – orchestra contracting
- James McMillan – programming
- Heff Moraes – mixing, engineering
- Richard Dowling – mastering

== Charts ==
=== Weekly charts ===
Chart (2003)	Peak position
Australia (ARIA) with "Love Ain't Gonna Wait for You"	75
Europe (Eurochart Hot 100)	9
Germany (GfK)	84
Ireland (IRMA)	6
Scottish Singles Sales (Official Charts) with "Love Ain't Gonna Wait for You"	1
UK Singles (Official Charts) with "Love Ain't Gonna Wait for You"	2

=== Year-end charts ===
Chart (2003)	Position
Ireland (IRMA)	93
UK Singles (OCC)	53

== Release history ==
Region	Date	Format(s)	Label(s)	Ref.
United Kingdom	26 May 2003	CD; cassette	Polydor; 19	
Australia	7 July 2003	CD	Polydor; 19	
