= Never Had a Dream Come True (S Club 7 song) =

2000 single by S Club 7

Single by S Club 7

from the album 7 (reissue)
- B-side: "Perfect Christmas"; "Spiritual Love"; "Stand by You"
- Released: 27 November 2000
- Recorded: 2000
- Genre: Pop
- Length: 4:00
- Label: Polydor; 19
- Songwriters: Cathy Dennis; Simon Ellis
- Producers: Cathy Dennis; Oskar Paul

S Club 7 singles chronology
| "Natural" (2000) | "Never Had a Dream Come True" (2000) | "Don't Stop Movin'" (2001) |

Audio sample
- file; help

Music video
- "Never Had a Dream Come True" on YouTube

"Never Had a Dream Come True" is a song by British pop group S Club 7, released as a single in the United Kingdom on 27 November 2000. It was chosen to be the official 2000 BBC Children in Need song. The pop ballad peaked atop the UK Singles Chart, becoming Britain's ninth-best-selling single of 2000. Outside the UK, it peaked within the top 10 of the charts in Ireland, Sweden, and the United States—where it reached number 10 and became the group's only single to appear on the Billboard Hot 100. The song was included on a re-release of the band's second album, 7 (2000), and their third album, Sunshine (2001).

== Content ==
The song "Never Had a Dream Come True" is about the aftermath of a break-up. The protagonist says that even though she might date other people, she will always have love for her former boyfriend. Jo O'Meara sings the lead vocals for the song while the rest of the members of S Club 7 perform backup vocals.

== Use in media ==
Jo O'Meara sings the song as a solo in S Club's 2003 feature film, Seeing Double. The demo version of the song was also used as the opening theme in the 2000 television series S Club 7 Go Wild! and the S Club 7 Christmas Special. The instrumental version of the demo was briefly heard in the earlier special Artistic Differences. S Club 7 performed the song in the ITV Panto Aladdin.

== Track listings ==
- UK Children in Need CD single
1. "Never Had a Dream Come True" – 4:00
2. "Perfect Christmas" – 4:38
3. "Reach" (Almighty mix) – 9:12
4. "Never Had a Dream Come True" (CD-ROM video)
- UK standard CD single
1. "Never Had a Dream Come True" – 4:00
2. "Spiritual Love" – 3:51
3. "Stand by You" – 3:03
4. "Never Had a Dream Come True" (CD-ROM video)
- UK cassette single
1. "Never Had a Dream Come True" – 4:00
2. "Perfect Christmas" – 4:38
- US CD single
1. "Never Had a Dream Come True"
2. "Spiritual Love"
- Digital EP
1. "Never Had a Dream Come True" – 4:00
2. "Spiritual Love" – 3:52
3. "Stand by You" – 3:04
4. "Never Had a Dream Come True" (Mike Rizzo club mix) – 6:27
5. "Never Had a Dream Come True" (Mike Rizzo radio mix) – 3:33

== Credits and personnel ==
Credits are lifted from the Sunshine album booklet.

Studio

- Mastered at Transfermation (London, England)

Personnel

- Cathy Dennis – writing, production
- Simon Ellis – writing
- Paul Gendler – guitar
- Oskar Paul – keyboards, programming, production
- Pete Murray – keyboards
- Anne Dudley – string arrangement
- James McMillan – additional programming
- Stephen Lipson – additional programming, additional production
- Heff Moraes – mixing
- James Reynolds – engineering
- Richard Dowling – mastering

== Charts ==
=== Weekly charts ===
| Chart (2000–2001) | Peak position |
|---|---|
| Canada CHR (Nielsen BDS) | 14 |
| Europe (Eurochart Hot 100) | 9 |
| Ireland (IRMA) | 2 |
| New Zealand (Recorded Music NZ) | 31 |
| Scottish Singles Sales (Official Charts) | 1 |
| Sweden (Sverigetopplistan) | 10 |
| UK Singles (Official Charts) | 1 |
| UK Airplay (Music Week) | 18 |
| US Billboard Hot 100 | 10 |
| US Adult Contemporary (Billboard) | 8 |
| US Mainstream Top 40 (Billboard) | 8 |
| US Rhythmic Top 40 (Billboard) | 36 |

=== Year-end charts ===
| Chart (2000) | Position |
|---|---|
| Ireland (IRMA) | 14 |
| UK Singles (OCC) | 9 |

| Chart (2001) | Position |
|---|---|
| Canada Radio (Nielsen BDS) | 45 |
| Europe (Eurochart Hot 100) | 81 |
| Ireland (IRMA) | 43 |
| Sweden (Hitlistan) | 46 |
| UK Singles (OCC) | 116 |
| US Billboard Hot 100 | 61 |
| US Adult Contemporary (Billboard) | 26 |
| US Mainstream Top 40 (Billboard) | 37 |

| Chart (2002) | Position |
|---|---|
| US Adult Contemporary (Billboard) | 31 |

=== Decade-end charts ===
| Chart (2000–2009) | Position |
|---|---|
| UK Top 100 Songs of the Decade | 43 |

== Certifications ==
| Region | Certification | Certified units/sales |
|---|---|---|
| Sweden (GLF) | Gold | 15,000^{^} |
| United Kingdom (BPI) | Platinum | 853,000 |
^{^} Shipments figures based on certification alone.

== Release history ==
| Region | Date | Format(s) | Label(s) | Ref. |
|---|---|---|---|---|
| United Kingdom | 27 November 2000 | CD; cassette | Polydor; 19 | |
| United States | 24 April 2001 | CD; cassette | Polydor; 19; A&M | |

== Cover versions ==
Multiple artists have performed covers of the song, some of whom include pop duo Same Difference on series 4 of The X Factor in 2007 and singer Natalie Paris in 2023. In May 2024, Adele performed a brief snippet of the song during a live performance at her Weekends with Adele residency in Las Vegas.

On 26 November 2021, O'Meara released an acoustic version of the song on all digital streaming platforms.
