= Almighty Records =

UK record label

- Founded: 1989
- Genre: Dance-pop, hi-NRG
- Country of origin: England
- Location: London
- Official website: almightyrecords.com

Almighty Records is an English electronic dance music record label established in 1989. Almighty Records specialises in pop song remixes, dance-pop, and hi-NRG. The label's record producers, Almighty Associates, have remixed such performers as Rihanna, Cher, Katy Perry, Beyoncé, Jennifer Lopez, Diana Ross, Donna Summer, Elton John, Elvis Presley, Enrique Iglesias, Kelly Clarkson, Kylie Minogue, LeAnn Rimes, Nelly Furtado, Ricky Martin, Shakira, Shania Twain, Sheena Easton, Usher, Whitney Houston, Adam Lambert, S Club and Liza Fox.

Almighty Records' sublabels include Blast Records, Daisy Chain, East Side Records, Euphoric, Unit 4 Productions.

== Development of a fanbase ==
Since their first UK release in 1989, Almighty Records has covered popular chart songs that had no dance mix, or those that had officially commissioned dance mixes which did not fit the dance-pop genre. Starting its life as a record stall just off the dance-floor of Bromptons in Earls Court, one of London's historic night clubs, its mission has always been devoted to DJs, dancers and dance music. Launched and staffed by disc jockeys and club enthusiasts for twenty years, the first 12-inch release on the Almighty label was a cover of the Limahl single "Never Ending Story", the title song to the 1984 film of the same name. Chosen because the artist's original label, EMI, had allowed the extended version of that song go out of production, while club-goers still wanted to dance to it and buy it.

Almighty feature various artist names, which are in fact projects rather than actual singers or groups, with many different vocalists and session singers behind artists' names, many of them already famous as recording artists and even hit songwriters. Almighty's policy of not identifying its singers' birth names is down to the belief that faces and names aren't important and that the music speaks for itself.

By 1992 Almighty had enjoyed notable success thanks in part to their cover versions of ABBA tracks under the guise Abbacadabra. It was at this point that label boss Martyn Norris decided to give up his job and concentrate on Almighty full-time. Pop producer Pete Waterman played some of these tracks on his UK television show The Hitman and Her which boosted interest in the songs and the label, so much so that Waterman picked up some tracks, including "Dancing Queen" for his own label PWL. In September 1992, "Dancing Queen" charted at number 57 on the UK singles chart countdown and became a club hit in the US after being licensed to BMG, who had the track remixed by Love To Infinity.

Almighty achieved their first UK Singles Chart top 20 hit in 1993 with "I Will Always Love You", a cover of the song by Dolly Parton, Whitney Houston and others, which was performed by Sarah Washington and reached position 12 in the UK chart.

Almighty Records has been successful with various projects over the years, remaking almost all ABBA songs, including a track recorded, but unreleased by ABBA called "Just Like That". To date, Almighty have produced 5 albums and over 10 singles under the Abbacadabra project name, which has sold more than 250,000 units for the label. However, the project which has been the most successful internationally for Almighty is the Queer as Folk CD soundtrack which went gold within one month of going on sale in March 1999 in the UK. The release of this CD followed a request from the makers of the TV series, Red Productions, after another major record company turned down the opportunity due to poor rating of previous music-led television shows on Channel 4. Given a list of tracks, Almighty had one month to compile the music; however, some tracks could not be cleared in time for the release mainly due to time scales, including one by the group Steps who initially said that the show would be too "low profile" for them to be associated with. It was the success of this album which prompted Channel 4 to launch their own music division when the second series of Queer As Folk was made – an international franchise which is still around today.

By the end of 1999, at the label's ten-year anniversary, it was still making 12" vinyl and manufactured CD singles; even now the 12" vinyl single and CD single are considered obsolete formats, Almighty is still mailing out hard copies of their new product catalogues to mail order customers. To celebrate their ten-year success, Almighty released an album called A Decade Of Dance.

Since it started, 90% of the music shops Almighty dealt with all over the world have closed. Customers choose now to buy their CDs online or as a digital download from an online store such as Almighty's own shop or from Amazon. However, physical product sales still count for two-thirds of the label's business from their own online store.

In 2009, the label celebrated its 20th anniversary and in early 2010 released Almighty: Two Decades of Dance to mark the anniversary. This collection spans two decades, and includes all the tracks that in 2010 still remain Almighty's very best sellers over the full twenty years. The manufactured album is megamixed with 20 tracks on each disc – disc one from 2000 to 2010 and disc two from 1990 to 1999.

== Marketing ==
During the latter half of the 1990s Almighty concentrated efforts on producing remixes for record companies for the global club and dance scene and became de rigueur, and the most in-demand name in the pop-dance world, producing up to 5 mixes a week at their peak. It wasn't until 2004 when, in a change of direction for the label, Almighty stopped actively soliciting their remix services to record companies and closed their studio complex.

However, following on from the success of four Cilla Black remixes in 2009 for record label EMI, including one of "Something Tells Me" which was released as Cilla's 37th UK single, Almighty once again sought to produce official remixes. Following increased interest and visibility, Almighty were contacted by management company MWR (Matt Waterhouse Represents) which boasts the most in demand remixers including Cahill, Digital Dog, Moto Blanco, StoneBridge, Wideboys and more. Under Matt's management, Almighty have recently created mixes for top acts including but not limited too – Alexandra Burke, Cher(Burlesque), Cheryl Cole, Elvis Presley, Inna, Katy Perry, Matthew Morrison (Glee), The Saturdays, The Wanted, and Usher.

Today Almighty are popular around the world, especially among gay communities and often market themselves as a gay label; advertising in gay press and releasing various albums specifically targeted at a gay audience.

With unwavering support through the years from the gay community, Almighty has become synonymous with the joyous, hands-in-the-air sound of summer dance music.

— Dean Ferguson, New York,

In recent years Almighty have made their productions available to a wider customer base after making a deal with Universal Music, and more recently with The Orchard, which allows Almighty to sell on most digital platforms including iTunes and Amazon.com. Recently some Almighty Productions have also been made available on Beatport. 2010 is the first year that Almighty products have been made available in the US and Canada.

Not all of Almighty's productions are available on general release, however fans can become members of the Almighty Club. Members receive most items that Almighty produce including special promotional material and additional, previously unreleased recordings.

It can take Almighty from one to three people to produce a track, working on all elements of the production to the final mix down. Single releases are usually a fashion item, preferably chosen if there are no dance remixes of the song in question in the Hi-NRG genre, in the style that Almighty produce. Albums, on the other hand, are planned months in advance.

Over the years Almighty has featured mixes from other dance / pop producers, including Bimbo Jones, Stonebridge, Love To Infinity, Matt Pop, Wayne G, Porl Young, Tony Moran, Way Out West and The Rhythm Masters.

MD Martyn Norris has always overseen all Almighty productions and remixes. Almighty has worked with many talented producers over the years including Craig Hardy, Graham Wilcox, Gary Miller, Ian Gant, Ian Stephens, Jono Buchanan, Jon Musgrave, Richard Cottle, Rod Warren, Steve Hilton, and Jewels And Stone who worked at Almighty under the Mary Brazzle alias. Jon Dixon joined Almighty in 1996 as it first in-house producer / engineer and was responsible for helping set up the Almighty studios. Jon left Almighty in 2002 with colleague Gulio Perruci to set up a new remix team ‘Crash’. Jon returned to Almighty on a freelance basis from 2004 until 2010, during which time he has set up another joint venture 7th Heaven with ex Almighty employee Andy Wetson who had left Almighty back in 2005 when their London offices closed. Almighty continues with a number of well known producers was recently joined by two new young associates who are working under the guise of ‘Almighty Boys’.

== Studios ==
With the increase in remix work, and the continuation of their own production work Almighty updated their Gloucestershire based studios to include new Mac Pro computers, plus a plethora of new soft synths to join the existing keyboards. These include vintage Juno's, a Prophet-5 (previously owned by disco and Hi-NRG dance music composer and recording artist Patrick Cowley, which has been on loan to the label for a number of years) and an MKS-80 Super Jupiter.

The studio also boasts hard synths such as a Nord Lead, a Roland JV-2080, and a Korg M1. Previously Almighty had used software such as Cubase to produce mixes, but with the recent upgrades to the studio Almighty have opted to use Apple's Logic 9 in the production of new music in addition to their outboard equipment.

Almighty are also converting many of their old Cubase files from many years ago, and backing them up in Logic. Rather than rebuild a mix using the new software Almighty have stated that they would prefer to update a track, or remix it. Ten to 12 years ago, all of the effects came from outboard equipment, now many of these similar effects are produced on a computer and whilst they are similar they are not the same.

The vocals, or A cappellas are stored separately from the music on DATs of which there are approximately 1000 to 1500. Almighty will not copy and back them all up on disc, citing reasons including time constraints. It is just not realistic to copy them all and back them up. Almighty's main priority is to back up the remaining vocals from the four TASCAM 88 machines to DVD.

== See also ==
- Cruz 101
- Natalie Browne
