= Don't Stop Movin' (S Club 7 song) =

2001 single by S Club 7

Single by S Club 7

from the album Sunshine
- B-side: "Right Guy"; "Lately"
- Released: 23 April 2001
- Length: 3:53
- Label: Polydor; 19
- Songwriters: Simon Ellis; Sheppard Solomon; S Club 7
- Producer: Simon Ellis

S Club 7 singles chronology
"Never Had a Dream Come True" (2000)	"Don't Stop Movin'" (2001)	"Have You Ever" (2001)

Audio sample
- file; help

Music video
- "Don't Stop Movin'" on YouTube

"Don't Stop Movin'" is a song by British pop group S Club 7, released on 23 April 2001 as the lead single from their third studio album, Sunshine (2001). The song was written by the group, along with their regular songwriter Simon Ellis, together with Sheppard Solomon. Solomon had worked on hits in the 1990s by Eternal and Michelle Gayle. The disco-oriented song features lead vocals by Bradley McIntosh and Jo O'Meara.

The song reached number one on the UK Singles Chart twice in the course of one month, with Geri Halliwell's "It's Raining Men" spending two weeks at the top position in between. The song's popularity rendered it the year's seventh biggest-selling single. It was also awarded the BRIT Award for Best British Single in 2002 and ITV's Record of the Year accolade. The song made it to number 3 in Q's "Guilty Pleasures" list in August 2006. It has sold 1,137,000 copies in the United Kingdom, as stated by the Official Charts Company.

== Music video ==
The official music video for the song was directed by Andy Morahan.

== Track listings ==
- UK and Australian CD1; Japanese CD single
1. "Don't Stop Movin'" – 3:53
2. "Don't Stop Movin'" (Jewels & Stone radio mix) – 3:51
3. "Right Guy" – 3:40
4. "Don't Stop Movin'" (CD-ROM video) – 3:53
- UK CD2
1. "Don't Stop Movin'" – 3:53
2. "Reach" (karaoke version) – 4:05
3. "Bring It All Back" (karaoke version) – 3:34
- UK cassette single
1. "Don't Stop Movin'" – 3:53
2. "Lately" – 4:32
- European CD single
1. "Don't Stop Movin'" – 3:53
2. "Don't Stop Movin'" (Jewels & Stone radio mix) – 3:51
- Australian CD2
1. "Don't Stop Movin'" – 3:53
2. "Don't Stop Movin'" (Pants 'N' Corset club) – 7:27
3. "Don't Stop Movin'" (Trisco remix) – 7:31
4. "Don't Stop Movin'" (CD-ROM video) – 3:53
- Digital single
1. "Don't Stop Movin'" – 3:53
2. "Right Guy"^{[a]} – 3:40
3. "Lately" – 4:32
4. "Don't Stop Movin'" (Jewels & Stone mix) – 5:01
5. "Don't Stop Movin'" (Jewels & Stone radio mix) – 3:51
6. "Don't Stop Movin'" (Trisco's vocal mix) – 7:31
7. "Don't Stop Movin'" (Trisco instrumental) – 7:31
8. "Don't Stop Movin'" (Pants 'n' Corset club mix) – 7:27
9. "Don't Stop Movin'" (Pants 'n' Corset Tuff dub) – 8:05
10. "Don't Stop Movin'" (Steve Thomas remix) – 6:35
11. "Don't Stop Movin'" (D-Bop's Mirrorball mix) – 6:34
12. "Don't Stop Movin'" (karaoke version) – 3:32

=== Notes ===
- ^{^[a]} The "Right Guy" version included on the 2023 digital single is the album version.

== Credits and personnel ==
Credits are lifted from the Sunshine album booklet.

Studio

- Mastered at Transfermation (London, England)

Personnel

- Simon Ellis – writing, keyboards, programming, production
- Sheppard Solomon – writing
- S Club 7 – writing
- Dave Rainger – guitar
- Ernie McKone – bass
- Gavyn Wright – concertmaster
- Nick Ingman – arrangement, conducting
- Isobel Griffiths – orchestral contracting
- Richard Robson – additional programming
- Chuck Norman – additional programming
- Stephen Lipson – additional programming, additional production
- Heff Moraes – mixing
- James Reynolds – engineering
- Richard Dowling – mastering

== Charts ==
=== Weekly charts ===
Chart (2001)	Peak position
Australia (ARIA)	2
Austria (Ö3 Austria Top 40)	9
Belgium (Ultratop 50 Flanders)	43
Belgium (Ultratip Bubbling Under Wallonia)	6
Denmark (Tracklisten)	18
Europe (Eurochart Hot 100)	8
France (SNEP)	20
Germany (GfK)	9
Ireland (IRMA)	1
Italy (FIMI)	27
New Zealand (Recorded Music NZ)	3
Poland (PiF PaF)	3
Scottish Singles Sales (Official Charts)	1
Sweden (Sverigetopplistan)	4
Switzerland (Schweizer Hitparade)	1
UK Singles (Official Charts)	1
UK Airplay (Music Week)	1

Chart (2023)	Peak position
UK Singles Downloads (Official Charts)	94

=== Year-end charts ===
Chart (2001)	Position
Australia (ARIA)	16
Austria (Ö3 Austria Top 40)	69
Europe (Eurochart Hot 100)	41
Germany (Media Control)	91
Ireland (IRMA)	9
New Zealand (RIANZ)	25
Sweden (Hitlistan)	41
Switzerland (Schweizer Hitparade)	28
UK Singles (OCC)	7
UK Airplay (Music Week)	10

=== Decade-end charts ===
Chart (2000–2009)	Position
UK Singles (OCC)	26

== Certifications ==
Region	Certification	Certified units/sales
Australia (ARIA)	2× Platinum	140,000^{^}
New Zealand (RMNZ)	Platinum	30,000^{‡}
Sweden (GLF)	Gold	15,000^{^}
United Kingdom (BPI)	2× Platinum	1,200,000^{‡}
^{^} Shipments figures based on certification alone.^{‡} Sales+streaming figures based on certification alone.

== Release history ==
Region	Date	Format(s)	Label(s)	Ref.
United Kingdom	23 April 2001	CD; cassette	Polydor; 19	
Australia	2 July 2001	CD1	Polydor; 19	
Australia	24 September 2001	CD2	Polydor; 19	
Japan	7 November 2001	CD	Polydor; 19	

== Cover versions ==
On Ant & Dec's Saturday Night Takeaway, as part of Ant vs. Dec: The Teams, their challenge was to record a charity single. Ant's team sang this song as their single. They lost the challenge, however they still managed to chart at number 79 on the UK Singles Chart.

Starsailor covered this song on Radio 1's Live Lounge.

The song was also recorded by The Beautiful South for their cover album Golddiggas, Headnodders and Pholk Songs at a slower tempo in contrast to the original.

Boy band 911 sang the song on the ITV television programme Hit Me, Baby, One More Time.

Jo O'Meara recorded an "unplugged" acoustic version of the song in 2021 to mark 20 years since its original release. The song was featured in her second solo album With Love.

In 2022, popular British DJs Jax Jones and ACT ON sampled and remixed the song.
