= Simon Ellis (music producer) =

British songwriter and producer

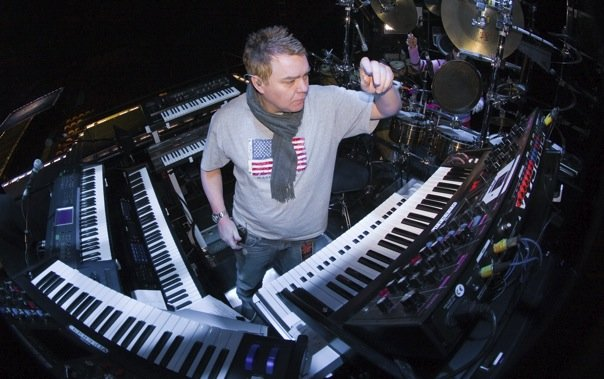
- Simon Ellis in 2008

Background information
- Born: Simon Peter Ellis; Bradford, England
- Genres: Pop, synthpop
- Occupations: Songwriter, record producer, musician, musical director
- Years active: 1987–present
- Website: simonellismusic.com

Simon Peter Ellis is an English songwriter, producer, musician and musical director who has worked with many artists including the Spice Girls, Britney Spears, Westlife, S Club 7, East 17, and music mogul Simon Fuller. Ellis co-wrote and produced the chart topping S Club 7 hits "Two in a Million", "Never Had a Dream Come True" and "Don't Stop Movin'", the latter winning ITV record of the year award in 2001 and "Best British Single" at the Brit Award 2002.

== Career ==
=== Early career ===
In 1988, Ellis co-formed the band Ellis, Beggs & Howard consisting of himself, Nick Beggs and Austin Howard. Their first single, "Big Bubbles, No Troubles" reached number 41 in the UK charts. The band split c. 1990 during the sessions for a second album.

In 1994, Ellis took up his first musical director job with the band D:Ream. He toured with them for a couple of years until he then went on to join East 17 as part of their live band on promotional tours.

=== 19 Entertainment ===
In 1997, Ellis got his major break as a musician when was head hunted by Simon Fuller, for the then new project, the Spice Girls. Fuller brought Ellis into the world of 19 Entertainment and gave him the job as the girls' musical director. Ellis went on to securing a publishing deal from Fuller, where he wrote and produced chart topping records for a variety of artists. As of 2023, Ellis continues to work with Fuller at the rebranded XIX Entertainment.

=== Spice Girls ===
Ellis made TV appearances with the girls, and was the mastermind behind all of their first concerts and world tours except Spice World Tour 2019.

=== S Club 7 ===
The producer has worked with English group S Club 7, dating back to the late 1990s. He co-wrote and produced three top five UK singles with the band, including two number ones. He has toured with the group on all of their live concert tours as the musical director.

=== Britney Spears ===
During 2009, Ellis was appointed the role of musical director for Britney Spears's The Circus Starring Britney Spears, consequently leading on to 2011 when he once again was asked to MD for Spears' Femme Fatale Tour.

=== Westlife ===
In 2019, Ellis reunited with Westlife, whom he worked with on two of their past concert tours − Where We Are Tour (2010) and Gravity Tour (2011), and was appointed the musical director for their comeback 2019 The Twenty Tour. Simon has contnued to MD the band's tours since, running through to their most recent The 25th Anniversary World Tour in 2026.

== Personal life ==
Born in Bradford, West Yorkshire, Ellis lived with his mother and brother in his early years. Growing up he attended Swain House School followed by Hanson School, before then going on to study at Bradford Art School and Preston Art School where he graduated with a BA Honours in Graphic Design.

Ellis now resides in Hebden Bridge.

== Concert tours ==
Ellis has been involved as the musical director, mixer and/or keyboard player in the following concert tours, gigs and TV appearances:

=== Britney Spears ===
- The Circus Starring Britney Spears (2009)
- Femme Fatale (2011)

=== Emma Bunton ===
- Emma Bunton The Christmas Show (2022)

=== Spice Girls ===
- Girl Power! Live in Istanbul (1997)
- Spiceworld (1998)
- Christmas in Spiceworld (1999)
- The Return of The Spice Girls (2007–08)
- London Olympics Closing Ceremony (2012)

=== S Club 7 ===
- S Club Party (2001–02)
- Carnival Tour (2002)
- S Club United Tour with S Club Juniors (2003)
- Bring It All Back (2015)
- The Good Times Tour (2023)

=== Westlife ===
- Gravity Tour (2011)
- Greatest Hits Tour (2012)
- The Twenty Tour (2019)
- The Wild Dreams Tour (2022–24)
- The Hits Tour – North America (2024)
- The 25th Anniversary World Tour (2026)

== Awards and nominations ==
=== ITV Record of the Year ===
Year	Nominee / work	Award	Result
2001	"Don't Stop Movin'"	The Record of the Year	Won

=== Brit Award ===
Year	Nominee / work	Award	Result
2002	"Don't Stop Movin'"	Best British Single – Writer & Producer	Won

=== The Ivor Novello Awards ===
Year	Nominee / work	Award	Result
2001	"Never Had a Dream Come True"	Best Song Musically and Lyrically	Nominated
