= List of songs recorded by Rachel Stevens =

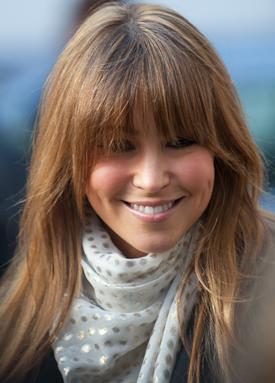
Rachel Stevens attending London Fashion Week in 2010

English singer Rachel Stevens, a member of pop group S Club, has recorded songs for two solo studio albums, some of which were collaborations with other recording artists. Stevens has also contributed vocals for charity singles.

Her debut studio album, entitled Funky Dory, was released in September 2003. The lead single, "Sweet Dreams My LA Ex", was co-written by Ivor Novello Award winner Cathy Dennis. Dennis also contributed to two other tracks on the album: "Glide" and "Little Secret". "Glide" was written in collaboration with Swedish production team Bloodshy & Avant, while "Little Secret" was co-written with Guy Chambers. The album's self-titled second single was penned by Gary Clark and Martin Brammer, and contained a sample of David Bowie's song "Andy Warhol". British songwriter Richard X received a writing credit for the song "Some Girls" alongside Hannah Robinson.

Stevens released her second album called Come and Get It in October 2005. It was preceded by the lead single called "Negotiate with Love", a dance-pop song which was written by Swedish production duo Vacuum and Australian siblings Nervo. The second single, "So Good", was co-written by Pascal Gabriel and Hannah Robinson. Robinson also collaborated with Richard X on the song "Crazy Boys". Stevens co-wrote the song "Funny How" with British production team Xenomania. "I Said Never Again (But Here We Are)", the album's third and final single, was written by the duo Jewels & Stone and Rob Davis.

== Songs ==
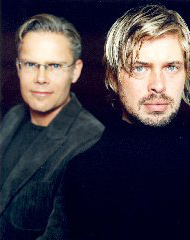
Swedish production duo Vacuum co-wrote the song "Negotiate with Love".

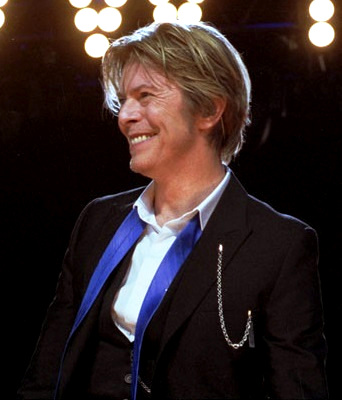
"Funky Dory" contained a sample of David Bowie's song "Andy Warhol".

Key
†	Indicates single release
—N/a	Indicates song not released on an album

Song	Writer(s)	Album	Year	Ref.
"Blue Afternoon"	Henrik Korpi; Mathias Johansson; Yak Bondy	Funky Dory	2003	
"Breathe In Breathe Out"	Daniel Thørnqvist; Rikard Lögfgren	Funky Dory	2003	
"Crazy Boys"	Hannah Robinson; Richard X	Come and Get It	2005	
"Do They Know It's Christmas?" †^{1}	Bob Geldof; Midge Ure	—N/a	2004	
"Dumb Dumb"	David Eriksen; J. Valentine; Tom Nichols	Come and Get It	2005	
"Every Little Thing"	Julian Gingell; Barry Stone; Rob Davis	Come and Get It	2005	
"Fools"	Anders Bagge; Arnthor Birgisson; Karen Poole	Funky Dory	2003	
"Funky Dory" †	Gary Clark; Martin Bramme; David Bowie	Funky Dory	2003	
"Funny How"	Rachel Stevens; Brian Higgins; Lisa Cowling; Miranda Cooper; Nick Coler; Tim Powell	Come and Get It	2005	
"Glide"	Cathy Dennis; Christian Karlsson; Henrik Jonback; Pontus Winnberg	Funky Dory	2003	
"Heaven Has to Wait"	Cathy Dennis; Anders Bagge; Arnthor Birgisson	Funky Dory	2003	
"I Got the Money"	Ben Chapman; Lucie Silvas; Martin Harrington	Funky Dory	2003	
"I Said Never Again (But Here We Are)" †	Julian Gingell; Barry Stone; Rob Davis	Come and Get It	2005	
"I Will Be There"	Hannah Robinson; Pascal Gabriel; Paul Statham	Come and Get It	2005	
"It's All About Me"	Boris Williams; Fraser T Smith; Laurence Tolhurst; Porl Thompson, Richard Cardwell; Robert Smith; Roger O'Donnell; Simon Gallup	Come and Get It	2005	
"Je M'apelle"	Damian LeGassick; Sherry Poole	Come and Get It	2005	
"Knock on Wood"	Eddie Floyd; Steve Cropper	DiscoMania	2004	
"Little Secret"	Cathy Dennis; Guy Chambers	Funky Dory	2003	
"More More More" †	Gregg Diamond	Funky Dory	2004	
"Negotiate with Love" †	Anders Wollbeck; Mattias Lindblom; Miriam Nervo; Olivia Nervo	Come and Get It	2005	
"Never Go Back"	Rachel Stevens; Hannah Robinson; Martin Buttrich; Johnny Pearson	—N/a	2005	
"Nothing Good About This Goodbye"	Alexis Strum; Brian Higgins; Nick Coler	Come and Get It	2005	
"Queen"	Anders Hansson; Kara DioGuardi	—N/a	2005	
"Secret Garden"	Jon Douglas; Karen Poole	Come and Get It	2005	
"Should Have Thought of That"	Howard New; Lucie Silvas	—N/a	2004	
"Silk"	Lucie Silvas; Michael Peden; Tom Nicholls	Funky Dory	2003	
"So Good" †	Hannah Robinson; Pascal Gabriel	Come and Get It	2005	
"Solid"	Børge Petersen-Øverleir; David Eriksen; Lisa Greene	Funky Dory	2003	
"Some Girls" †	Hannah Robinson; Richard X	Funky Dory	2004	
"Spin That Bottle"	Ben Chapman; Lucie Silvas; Martin Harrington	—N/a	2004	
"Sweet Dreams My L.A. Ex" †	Cathy Dennis; Christian Karlsson; Henrik Jonback; Pontus Winnberg	Funky Dory	2003	
"Waiting Game"	Rachel Stevens; Hannah Robinson; Greg Kurstin	—N/a	2005	

== Notes ==
1. "Do They Know It's Christmas?" was performed by Band Aid 20.
