= Rachel Stevens discography =

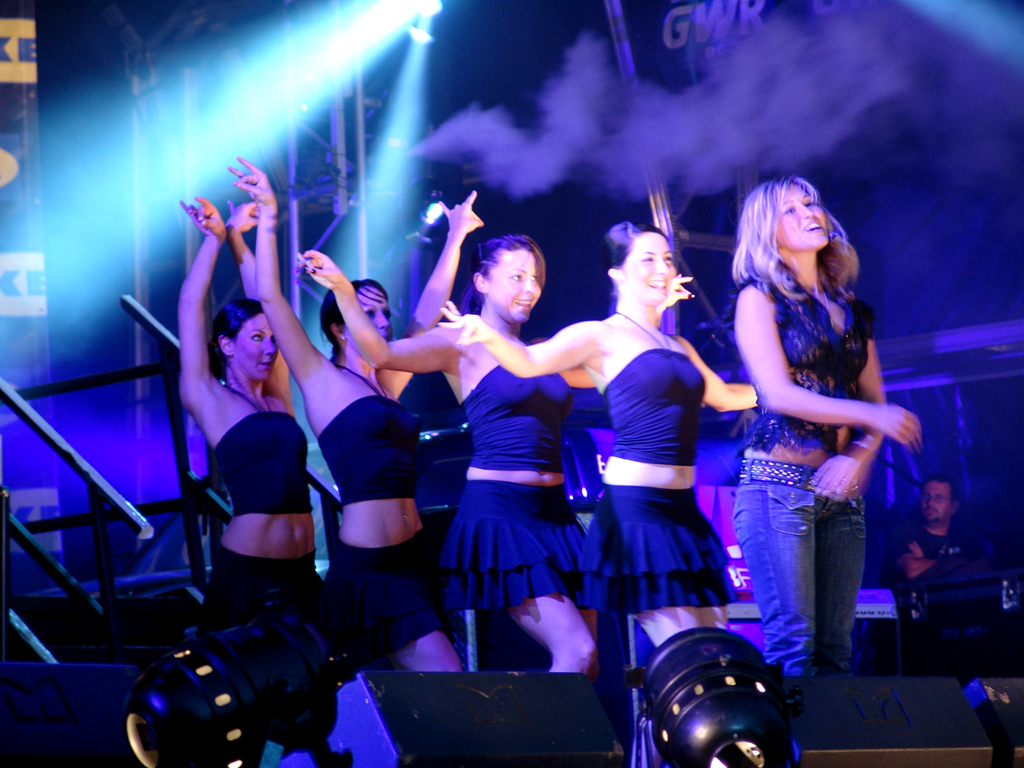
- Stevens performing in 2004.
- Studio albums: 2
- Singles: 7
- Music videos: 9
- Promotional singles: 2

The discography of Rachel Stevens, an English pop singer, consists of two studio albums and eight singles. Stevens released her solo debut studio album Funky Dory that September. The album reached number nine on the UK Albums Chart and the British Phonographic Industry (BPI) awarded it with a gold certification in October 2003. Two singles, "Sweet Dreams My L.A. Ex" and "Funky Dory", were initially released from the album: "Sweet Dreams My LA Ex" peaked at number two in the UK and received a silver certification from the BPI. In July 2004, Stevens released the single "Some Girls" as a charity record for Sport Relief, and the single's success prompted Polydor to re-issue Funky Dory with three new songs.

Come and Get It, her second studio album, was released in October 2005. The album peaked at number 28 on the UK Albums Chart, with two of its three singles managing to reach the top 10.

== Albums ==
=== Studio albums ===
List of studio albums, with selected chart positions and certifications
Title	Album details	Peak chart positions		Certifications
Title	Album details	UK	SCO	Certifications
Funky Dory	Released: 29 September 2003; Label: Polydor, 19	9	7	BPI: Gold
Come and Get It	Released: 17 October 2005; Label: Polydor, 19	28	28	

=== Compilations ===
List of albums
Title	Album details	Notes
Tasty Tunes	Released: 11 November 2011; Formats: CD, digital download; Label: Ella's Kitchen	Compilation with children's songs for Ella's Kitchen's charity project.

== Singles ==
=== As lead artist ===
List of singles, with selected chart positions and certifications
Single	Year	Peak chart positions										Certifications	Album
Single	Year	UK	BEL	DEN	GER	IRL	NL	NOR	SCO	SWE	SWI	Certifications	Album
"Sweet Dreams My L.A. Ex"	2003	2	25	2	64	3	79	5	2	24	63	BPI: Silver; IFPI SWE: Gold	Funky Dory
"Funky Dory"	2003	26	—	—	—	24	—	—	24	—	—		Funky Dory
"Some Girls"	2004	2	57	—	—	13	—	—	1	—	—		Funky Dory
"More, More, More"	2004	3	—	—	—	5	—	—	3	—	—		Funky Dory
"Negotiate with Love"	2005	10	—	—	—	17	—	—	11	—	—		Come and Get It
"So Good"	2005	10	—	—	—	14	—	—	—	—	—		Come and Get It
"I Said Never Again (But Here We Are)"	2005	12	—	—	—	34	—	—	8	—	—		Come and Get It
"—" denotes releases that did not chart or were not released in that territory.

=== As featured artist ===
List of singles, with selected chart positions
Title	Year	Peak chart positions										Album
Title	Year	UK	AUS	BEL	DEN	GER	IRL	NL	NOR	SWE	SWI	Album
"Do They Know It's Christmas?" (among Band Aid 20)	2004	1	9	7	1	7	1	5	1	6	7	Non-album single

=== Promotional singles ===
List of singles
Song	Year	Album
"Breathe In, Breathe Out"	2004	Funky Dory
"Crazy Boys"	2006	Come and Get It
"The Greatest Love of All" (Duncan James featuring Rachel Stevens)	2009	Non-album single

== Other appearances ==
Title	Year	Album
"Fools"	2004	The Princess Diaries 2
"Knock on Wood"	2004	DiscoMania
"Breathe In, Breathe Out (Tom Neville Dub)"	2004	UK Club Beats

== Music videos ==
List of music videos, showing year released and director
Title	Year	Director	Notes
"Sweet Dreams My L.A. Ex"	2003	Tim Royes	
"Funky Dory"	2003	Katie Bell	
"Some Girls"	2004	Paul Weiland	
"More More More"	2004	Urban Strum	
"Do They Know It's Christmas?"	2004	Geoff Wonfor	Among Band Aid 20
"Negotiate with Love"	2005	Harvey & Carolyn	
"So Good"	2005	Cameron Casey	
"I Said Never Again (But Here We Are)"	2005	Trudy Bellinger	
"The Greatest Love"	2009	Tim Royes	Featured artist; Duncan James's music video
