= White Witch (album) =

Studio album by Andrea True Connection
- Released: 1977
- Genre: Disco
- Length: 32:56
- Label: Buddah
- Producers: Michael Zager, Andrea True, Elliot Apter, Mark Milchman

Andrea True Connection chronology
More, More, More (1976)	White Witch (1977)	War Machine (1980)

White Witch is the second studio album by the group Andrea True Connection, released in 1977 by Buddah Records. The album spawned two moderate hit singles: "N.Y., You Got Me Dancing" and "What's Your Name, What's Your Number". White Witch wasn't a commercial success and failed to enter any sales charts. It was the last album released by the group, and the vocalist Andrea True would later release only one solo album in 1980.

== Background and production ==
After the success of her first album and the gold-certified single "More, More, More", the band began to prepare for their second release. The album production included studio musicians with a new band assembled for the tour, which included future Kiss guitarist Bruce Kulick. The material was co-produced by the disco pioneers Michael Zager and Jerry Love.

== Singles ==
The first single from the album was "N.Y., You Got Me Dancing", released in early 1977, which became True's second biggest hit, reaching No. 27 on Billboard's pop chart, and No. 4 on the club chart. It peaked at No. 89 on the Canadian singles chart. "What's Your Name, What's Your Number" was released as the second and last single of the album (and also of the group) in late 1977. It reached No. 56 on the US pop chart, No. 9 on the club chart, and No. 34 in the UK.

== Critical reception ==
Professional ratings
Review scores
Source	Rating
AllMusic	2.5/5 stars

In a 1978 review, Billboard referred to the album as "a mixed bag", describing most of the material as "pop-flavored, curiously carrying a late '60s feel", yet noting that the "[s]ound is perky, with useful keyboards, guitar and percussion work behind True's idiosyncratic vocals."

In a retrospective mixed review, Alex Henderson from AllMusic wrote that, "while White Witch isn't a bad album, it falls short of the excellence [of] her first album, More, More, More." He also stated that there are a few gems in the album, "including the Michael Zager-produced "What's Your Name, What's Your Number" and the exuberant, Gregg Diamond-produced "N.Y., You Got Me Dancing" – both of which are exercises in unapologetically campy fun." He concluded that the "LP is strictly for diehard disco collectors."

== Track listing ==
Side one
No.	Title	Writer(s)	Length
1.	"What's Your Name, What's Your Number"	Roger Cook, Bobby Woods	6:36
2.	"You Make Love Worthwhile"	Robert Brown, Doug Cosman	4:33
3.	"Life Is What You Make It"	Alvin Fields, Michael Zager	3:21
4.	"It's All Up to You"	Alvin Fields, Michael Zager	3:04
Total length:			17:34

Side two
No.	Title	Writer(s)	Length
1.	"N.Y., You Got Me Dancing"	Gregg Diamond	6:04
2.	"White Witch"	Val Burke, Andrea True	3:18
3.	"Sally Can't Dance"	Lou Reed	3:06
Total length:			12:28
