= Let's All Chant =

Song by Michael Zager

Single by the Michael Zager Band

from the album Let's All Chant
- B-side: "Love Express"
- Released: December 1977
- Recorded: Secret Sound Studios, Manhattan
- Genre: Disco
- Length: 3:07 (7" version); 7:03 (12" version)
- Label: Private Stock
- Songwriters: Michael Zager; Alvin Fields
- Producer: Michael Zager

The Michael Zager Band singles chronology
"Do It with Feeling" (1976)	"Let's All Chant" (1977)	"Life's a Party" (1978)

"Let's All Chant" is a song written by American record producer and composer Michael Zager and Alvin Fields, and performed by the Michael Zager Band. It was based on an idea originally suggested by former A&M Records head of A&R Jerry Love after he visited clubs in New York and saw people endlessly chanting "Ooh-ah, Ooh-ah". Although Zager was first embarrassed when Love asked him to write a song using these chants, he accepted the proposal and later co-wrote "Let's All Chant" with Fields.

The opening track and lead single from the group's eponymous LP, "Let's All Chant" was released as a single in December 1977, with the track "Love Express" as a B-side. An unexpected smash hit, the single reached number one on the disco chart and crossed over to the Soul Singles chart, where it peaked at number 15, and to the Billboard Hot 100, where it peaked at number 36. In Europe, the single reached the top 10 in several countries, including the UK, Ireland and France. In Italy it peaked at number 2. It eventually sold five million copies worldwide.

Recognizable by both its vocal hooks and its classical section, which is featured in the middle of the song, "Let's All Chant" was well received by critics, who have praised its musical arrangement and its catchiness. Many reviewers regard the song as a classic of the disco era. It also became a turning point in Michael Zager's career. As well as being used in many TV advertisements and movies, it has become an influential dance song that has been extensively covered or remixed by numerous artists and has been interpolated or sampled in many other tracks.

== Background and recording ==
When he was still at A&M Records, Michael Zager met Jerry Love, a former head of A&R at A&M Records. After Love subsequently left the record label, he and Zager formed the Michael Zager Moon's Band in 1976. Love frequented Studio 54 and went to clubs every night. One evening, he went to Greenwich Village to visit several clubs and noted that people were continuously singing "Ooh-ah, Ooh-ah" to every tune that was played in order to increase their own participation and pleasure. The next day, he described the scene to Zager and suggested that Zager write a song incorporating the "Ooh-ah, Ooh-ah" vocals. Zager told Love: "You have to be kidding; that's embarrassing!" Love commented that everybody was doing it and that if Zager wrote a song using these chants, dancers would love it.

In parallel, the group's name was changed to the Michael Zager Band and they signed with the label Private Stock Records. For their forthcoming LP, Zager wrote two songs, "Let's All Chant" and "Love Express", together with Alvin Fields. The co-writer shared lead vocals on "Let's All Chant" with session singers Dollette McDonald and Billy Baker. Zager added a classical section to the track. He later remarked:

The reason I added the piccolo trumpet and classical section in the middle of "Let's All Chant" was mainly because I was embarrassed! I thought it was so stupid with that "Ooh-ah" sound in it that I wanted to add something to lift the track musically. I have a classical background and went to a music conservatory, so I was really feeling embarrassed

"Let's All Chant" and "Love Express" were both recorded at the Secret Sound Studios, in Manhattan. Once the tracks were recorded, Zager told Fields: "I'm gonna kill you if this isn't a hit!"

== Composition ==
"Let's All Chant" is a disco song driven by a repetitive bassline, handclaps and numerous vocal hooks (such as "Ah-ah, eh-eh, let's all chant" and "Your body, my body, everybody work your body"). These typical disco lyrics are about dancing and working one's body. The song's instrumentation also includes Afro-Cuban drums, a "rollicking" piano line and a clarinet (played by woodwind doubler George Marge), marked by a piccolo trumpet solo that sounds "like it's straight out of the Dynasty opening theme song". The song's tempo is 121 bpm and is very close to the average tempo of a standard disco song (120 bpm). According to AllMusic reviewer Alex Henderson, the combination of the "European-influenced, oddly baroque" feeling with a "catchy disco/funk beat" grabs the attention of the listener and encourages him to discover the rest of the eponymous LP.

== Commercial performance and sales ==
"We thought it would be a club hit, but it never entered my mind it would be a global hit. I thought it would be a two-month record and that would be the end of it."

— Michael Zager

"Let's All Chant" was released as a single with "Love Express" as a B-side in December 1977, on Christmas week. Zager thought it was the worst time to release the single because many artists usually released their albums during this period and thought the single would only become a "disco hit". However, the single became an unexpected smash hit. It climbed to number one on the disco chart on February 18, 1978, knocking Cerrone's "Supernature" off the top spot, and remained atop the chart for one week, before being toppled by Bionic Boogie's "Dance Little Dreamer". In the US, "Let's All Chant" also charted at number 15 on the Soul Singles chart, number 25 on the Cash Box Top 100, number 31 on the Record World and number 36 on the Billboard Hot 100. In Canada, the single peaked at number two on the dance chart (behind "Supernature") and at number 27 on the singles chart. A music video was simultaneously released.

The single did even better in Europe, reaching the top 10 in several countries. It peaked at number eight on both the UK Singles Chart and the Irish Singles Chart. In the Netherlands, the song reached the fourth place on the Dutch Top 40 and the Single Top 100 charts and stayed for thirteen weeks on both charts. It also reached number four in Switzerland, where it became the 25th best-selling single of the year 1978. In France, "Let's All Chant" peaked at number five and became the eleventh best-selling single of 1978 in this country. In Belgium, it peaked at number two for three weeks, and remains the eight best-selling single of the year. The single also reached number 14 in West Germany and stayed for 21 weeks on the national chart.

By July 1979, the single had sold over three million copies worldwide and eventually went on to sell five million copies worldwide, selling about 6 to 700,000 copies in the US. It was also certified gold by the Canadian Recording Industry Association (CRIA) for certified sales of 75,000 copies.

== Critical reception ==
Critically, AllMusic's Henderson provided a mixed description of the track. Although he criticized the lyrics for being "usual disco clichés", he also called the song "quirky", "infectious" and "interesting" and viewed "Let's All Chant" as one of the most "unorthodox disco hits of 1978". In their book Saturday Night Forever: The Story of Disco, Alan Jones and Jussi Kantonen described the song as being "supremely catchy and melodic, with a quite miraculous classical chamber music-style break in the middle" and considered the track "a key recording that instantly defines the disco era." They also regarded "Let's All Chant" as the high point in Michael Zager's career. In 2006, Slant Magazine ranked the song number 50 in its 100 Greatest Dance Songs list, describing it as a "deft mix of disco, funk and baroque-pop" and writing that the song's breakdown made it special. The track was also ranked 165th on the 700 Top Disco Songs, a list drawn up by several DJs from all over the world.

== Track listings ==
- 7" single
1. "Let's All Chant" – 3:07
2. "Love Express" – 2:52
- 12" single
1. "Let's All Chant" – 7:03
2. "Love Express" – 7:01
- Reissue – 12" maxi
1. "Let's All Chant" – 7:05
2. "Traffic Jam" – 7:09
3. "Traffic Jam (Dub Mix)" – 4:03

== Charts and certifications ==
=== Weekly charts ===
Chart (1978)	Peak position
Australia (Kent Music Report)	23
Belgium (Ultratop 50 Flanders)	2
Canada Top Singles (RPM)	27
Canada Dance/Urban (RPM)	2
Finland (Suomen virallinen lista)	2
France (IFOP)	5
Ireland (IRMA)	8
Netherlands (Dutch Top 40)	4
Netherlands (Single Top 100)	4
Switzerland (Schweizer Hitparade)	4
UK Singles (Official Charts)	8
US Billboard Hot 100	36
US Hot Disco Singles (Billboard)	1
US Hot Soul Singles (Billboard)	15
US Cash Box Top 100	25
US Record World Singles	31
West Germany (GfK)	14

=== Year-end charts ===
Chart (1978)	Rank
Belgium (Ultratop 50 Flanders)	8
France (IFOP)	11
Netherlands (Dutch Top 40)	28
Netherlands (Single Top 100)	46
Switzerland (Schweizer Hitparade)	25

=== Sales and certifications ===
Region	Certification	Certified units/sales
Canada (Music Canada)	Gold	75,000^{^}
^{^} Shipments figures based on certification alone.

== Impact and influence ==
Following the song's release and worldwide success, "Let's All Chant" introduced Michael Zager in the mainstream and became a turning point in his career :

The song is bigger than ever, along with many other recordings I produced/composed etc. For example the Spinners' 'Working My Way Back to You' and 'Cupid' along with 'Right Before My Eyes' by Patti Day. But 'Let's All Chant' really put me on the 'map' as a composer, producer and arranger.

Private Stock promoted Michael Zager Band's eponymous LP due to the success of the song. It became a contributing factor the success of the LP. It also remains an influential dance track that has been heavily used on TV and in movies, as well as being covered or remixed by numerous artists or interpolated or sampled in other songs.

=== Appearances ===
==== Movies ====
- "Let's All Chant" is heard in the 1978 movie Eyes of Laura Mars, while Laura Mars is setting up an elaborate shoot juxtaposing murder and high fashion.
- The song is featured on the soundtrack of the 1998 movie The Last Days of Disco.
- It is used in the 1999 movie Summer of Sam.
- It is used in the 2021 Spanish-language Netflix film Las Leyes de la Frontera.

==== Television ====
- On November 17, 1978, the song was featured in "Ute und Manuela", the twelfth episode of the fifth season of the TV series Derrick.
- In September 2006, it was used in a TV advertising for Médiatis.

=== Cover versions and remixes ===
- In 1988, British duo Pat and Mick covered the song. It was released as their debut single with "On the Night" as the B-side and was credited to "Mick and Pat". This version reached number eleven on the UK Singles Chart and number four on the UK Indie Chart.
- In 1996, "Let's All Chant" was remixed by UK based producer and DJ Gusto. His version peaked at number 43 on the Flemish Ultratop 50 Singles chart and at number 21 on the UK Singles Chart.
- In 2002, it was remade by DJ Valium under the title "DJ Valium feat. Michael Zager". It charted in several countries, reaching number 42 in France, number 44 in Austria and number 73 in Germany.
- In the same year, it was covered by French act Seventy Three. Their version reached number 41 on the French Singles Chart and was used in an advertisement for Orangina in June 2003—and later in an advertisement for McDonald's in November 2003—in that country.
- Disco Queen also covered the song in 2003. Their version peaked at number 10 on the Greek charts.
- In 2010, Bob Sinclar remixed the song. The remix was used in a TV advertising for Oasis Tea.
- In the same year, the song was remixed by French DJs DatA, Nôze and DJ Zebra.

=== Interpolations ===
- In 2011, "Let's All Chant" was interpolated in "Galera" by Congolese-French singer Jessy Matador, which features King Kuduro and Bra Zil, and peaked at number 68 in France.
- In 2012, it was interpolated in "My Party" by German female artist DJane HouseKat and rapper Rameez. "My Party" charted well in Europe, reaching number 25 in Denmark, the top 20 in Switzerland and the top 10 in Austria and Germany. It also peaked at number 19 on the Dance Bubbling Under in Wallonia.

=== Charts ===
==== Pat & Mick version ====
Chart (1988)	Peak position
UK Singles (Official Charts)	11
UK Indie Chart	4

==== Gusto version ====
Chart (1996)	Peak position
Belgium (Ultratop 50 Flanders)	43
Belgium Dance (Ultratop)	10
Europe (Eurochart Hot 100)	46
Iceland (Íslenski Listinn Topp 40)	19
Netherlands (Dutch Top 40 Tipparade)	6
Netherlands (Dutch Single Tip)	8
Scottish Singles Sales (Official Charts)	26
UK Singles (Official Charts)	21
UK Dance (Official Charts)	2
UK Club Chart (Music Week)	1
UK Pop Tip Club Chart (Music Week)	4

==== DJ Valium version ====
Chart (2002)	Peak position
Austria (Ö3 Austria Top 40)	44
France (SNEP)	42
Germany (GfK)	73

==== Seventy Three version ====
Chart (2003)	Peak position
France (SNEP)	41

==== Disco Queen version ====
Chart (2003)	Peak position
Greece (IFPI)	10

==== Jessy Matador feat. King Kuduroand Bra Zil interpolation ====
Chart (2011)	Peak position
France (SNEP)	68

==== DJane HouseKat feat. Rameez interpolation ====
Chart (2012)	Peak position
Austria (Ö3 Austria Top 40)	3
Belgium (Ultratop Wallonia Dance Bubbling Under)	19
Denmark (Tracklisten)	25
Germany (GfK)	4
Switzerland (Schweizer Hitparade)	14

=== Samples ===
In 2008 Buy Now! sampled "Let's All Chant" on their song "Body Crash". The track peaked at number six on both the Flemish and Walloon Ultratop Dance charts

== See also ==
- List of number-one dance singles of 1978 (U.S.)
