= Rachel Stevens =

English singer and actress

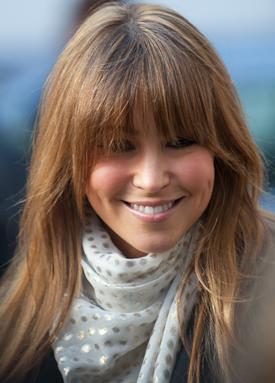
- Stevens in 2010
- Born: 9 April 1978 (age 48); Southgate, London, England
- Occupations: Singer; actress
- Years active: 1993–present
- Works: Solo discography and songs; S Club discography
- Spouse: Alex Bourne (m. 2009; div. 2022)
- Children: 2
- Musical career
- Genre: Pop
- Instrument: Vocals
- Label: Polydor
- Member of: S Club
- Website: rachelstevens.com

Rachel Lauren Stevens (born 9 April 1978) is an English singer and actress. She has been a member of the pop group S Club, which was active from 1998 to 2003, and has reformed once again since 2023. She released her solo debut studio album Funky Dory in September 2003. The album reached number nine on the UK album chart and the British Phonographic Industry (BPI) awarded it with a gold certification in October 2003. Two singles, "Sweet Dreams My L.A. Ex" and "Funky Dory", were initially released from the album: "Sweet Dreams My L.A. Ex" peaked at number two in the UK and received a silver certification from the BPI.

In July 2004, Stevens released the single "Some Girls" as a charity record for Sport Relief, and the single's success prompted Polydor to re-issue Funky Dory with three new songs. Come and Get It, her second studio album, was released in October 2005. It peaked at No. 28 in the UK, and two of its three singles reached the Top 10. Following the release, Stevens took an extended hiatus from her music career.

In 2008, she came second in the sixth series of the BBC One series Strictly Come Dancing with her dance partner Vincent Simone. In 2013, she was a mentor assistant on The X Factor New Zealand. In 2014 she was awarded FHM's sexiest woman of all time. Stevens became one of the coaches in the 4th season of RTE's The Voice of Ireland. Stevens' version of the song "More, More, More" has been used in adverts for sofa retailer ScS. In November 2014, S Club 7 announced plans for an arena reunion tour, titled Bring It All Back 2015, touring the UK briefly in May 2015. The band has reformed once again since 2023 under the 'S Club' moniker following the announcement of their Good Times tour.

== Early life ==
Born in Southgate, London, to a Jewish family, she had a Jewish upbringing and attended Osidge JMI School and Ashmole School in London. Her father is Michael Stevens and she has two brothers.

In 1993, she first caught attention by winning a modelling contest sponsored by UK teen magazine Just 17, beating 5,000 other competitors. Following her first modelling jobs, she decided to study at the London College of Fashion, where she achieved a diploma in business. During that time she also worked for a film company and later in public relations, but began to lose interest and decided to pursue a career in singing instead.

== Career ==
=== 1998–2003: S Club ===
Rachel was first approached by producers putting together S Club, age 18, while meeting her brother for lunch at Sony café

S Club rose to fame by starring in their own BBC television series, Miami 7, in 1999. Over the five years they were together, S Club 7 had four UK No.1 singles, one UK No.1 album, a string of hits throughout Europe, including a top-ten single in the United States, Asia, Latin America and Africa. They recorded a total of four studio albums, released eleven singles and went on to sell over fourteen million albums worldwide. Their first album, S Club, had a strong 1990s pop sound, similar to many artists of their time. However, through the course of their career, their musical approach changed to a more dance and R&B sound which is heard mostly in their final album, Seeing Double.

The concept and brand of the group was created by Simon Fuller, also their manager through 19 Entertainment; they were signed to Polydor Records. Their television series went on to last four series, seeing the group travel across the United States and eventually ending up in Barcelona, Spain. It became popular in 100 different countries where the show was watched by over 90 million viewers. The show, which was a children's sitcom, often mirrored real life events which had occurred in S Club, including the relationship of Hannah Spearritt and Paul Cattermole, as well as the eventual departure from the group of the latter. As well as the popularity of their television series, S Club 7 won two Brit Awards—in 2000 for British breakthrough act and in 2002, for best British single. In 2001, the group earned the Record of year. S Club's second to last single reached number-five in the UK charts and their final studio album failed to make the top ten. However, on 21 April 2003, during a live onstage performance, S Club announced that they were to disband.

=== 2003–2004: Funky Dory ===
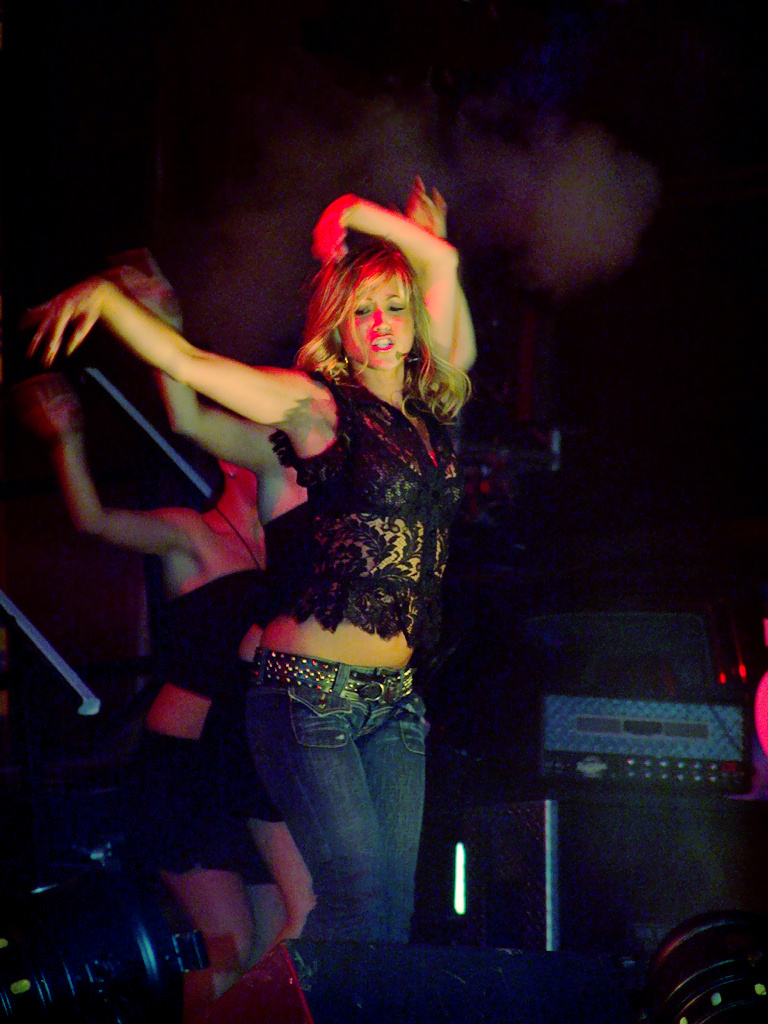
Stevens performing "Funky Dory".

In 2003, after S Club disbanded, Stevens signed a £1.5 million solo four-album deal with Polydor Records and re-signed with Fuller. She said that breaking out on her own after success with S Club was difficult: "I think we [S Club] ended up conforming to what people's perceptions were. This one was the ditzy one, this one was the singer, this one was the dancer. And to come out of that and be a whole person has been a real challenge for me. I didn't have my say, really, in the group. None of us did".

Her first solo single, written by Cathy Dennis and produced by Bloodshy & Avant, "Sweet Dreams My L.A. Ex", was released in September 2003. Taking inspiration from R&B and adult-style pop music, Stevens's debut solo album, Funky Dory, was released later that month. The album was a hit, reaching number 9 on the UK albums chart and was certified gold. The album also gained praise from pop critics; Jamie Gill, in a review for Yahoo! Launch, said that Stevens "eschews the cheap and cheerful approach of her old band for a slinky adult confidence and musical eclecticism."

That December the album's title track "Funky Dory", featuring a sample of the David Bowie song "Andy Warhol" from his album Hunky Dory, was released as its second single and failed to match the success of "Sweet Dreams My L.A. Ex", peaking at number twenty-four. MusicOMH called it "musically better than "Sweet Dreams My L.A. Ex" with a hybrid of pop, Latin and even a hint of jazz infusion" but not a good single choice as a single as it lacked anything special and different.

In July 2004, Stevens released the BBC Sport Relief charity single, "Some Girls", which was produced by Richard X. It became a hit across Europe, and reached number two in the UK. HMV.co.uk called the song Stevens's "finest song to date", and Yahoo! Launch commented that "she came to save her career. She ended up saving pop."

Stevens then signed a deal with Matalan reportedly worth £1 million and had her hit song "More More More" as the title song for Matalan's advertising campaign.

Following the success of "Some Girls", Funky Dory was re-released to include "Some Girls" and another new track, a cover of Andrea True Connection's "More More More". "More More More" was issued as a single and peaked at number 3 in the UK, giving Stevens her third top ten solo single in the UK. At this point, Stevens and her management stepped up promotion, earning her a Guinness World Record for "Most Public Appearances by a Pop Star in 24 Hours in Different Cities" (seven on 8–9 September 2004).

=== 2005–2007: Come and Get It and films ===
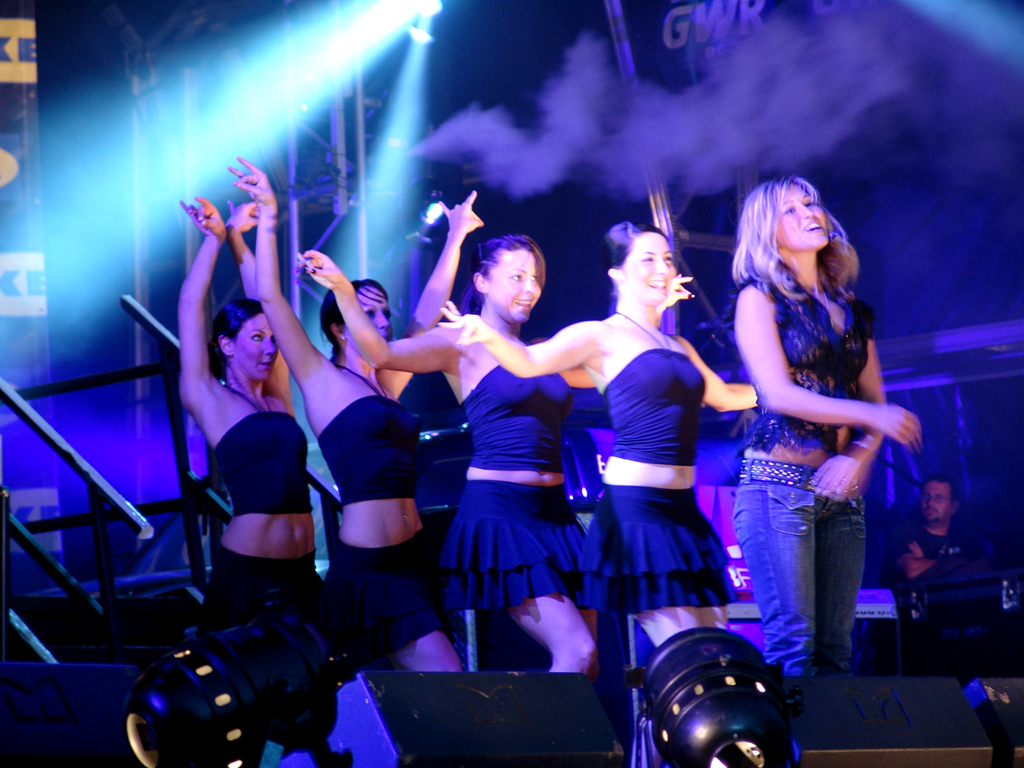
Stevens performing in 2004.

In March 2005, Stevens released her new single, "Negotiate with Love", that was a top ten hit in the UK. "So Good" was released in July 2005 and also peaked at number 10, being hailed as "tastily produced and sassily delivered." In mid-2005, Channel 4 broadcast a documentary which followed Stevens through the summer as she promoted "So Good". Her second album, Come and Get It, produced by Richard X and Xenomania, was released in October 2005 and peaked at number 28 in the UK. The album was included on The Guardian list "1,000 Albums You Must Hear Before You Die". The third and final single was "I Said Never Again (But Here We Are)", which peaked at number 12 in the UK and was commended by HMV.co.uk for its "astonishingly flawless vocal performance" and as Stevens's "most commercially accessible and quirky single since "Some Girls"."

In 2005 Stevens also appeared in the comedy films Deuce Bigalow: European Gigolo and Spider-Plant Man. She also appeared in comedy film Suzie Gold. In the following years, Stevens planned to release a third album, but dropped.

=== 2008–present: Business and other projects ===
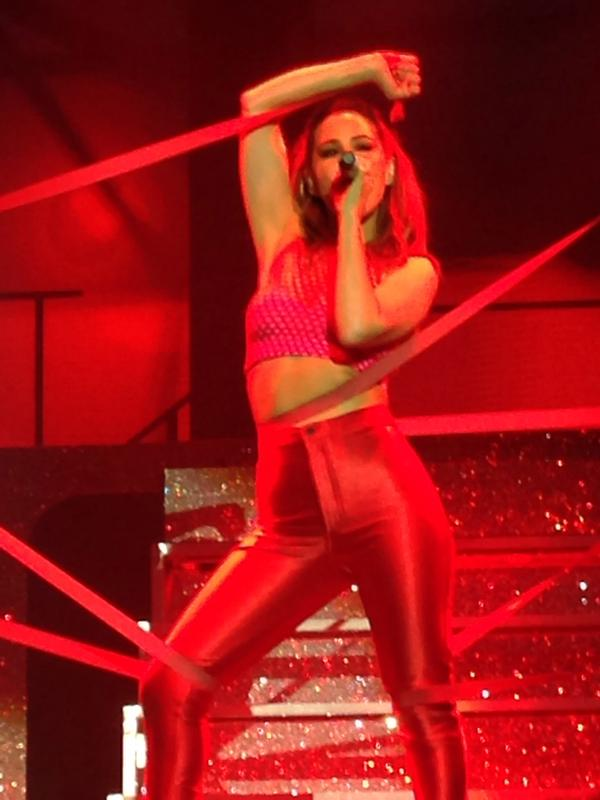
Stevens performing "Sweet Dreams My LA Ex" in 2015.

Since 2008, Stevens has been working as a businesswoman, co-creating clothing and makeup lines with British brands, in addition to philanthropic work – she worked for 5 years in the Make Poverty History. In August 2008 she was announced as contestant of Strictly Come Dancing as partner with professional dancer Vincent Simone. She finished in second place. Stevens and Simone also took part in the Strictly Come Dancing Christmas Specials to 2008 from 2014. In July 2011 a demo track entitled "Nothing in Common", which was recorded for Come and Get It, was uploaded online. In 2011 she released a charity children's compilation Tasty Tunes in a project with toddlers food company Ella's Kitchen.

In 2013 Stevens was mentor assistant on the New Zealand version of The X-Factor helping Melanie Blatt with the groups category. On 6 October 2014, Irish state broadcaster RTÉ confirmed that Stevens would be taking on one of the red chairs on The Voice of Ireland as the fourth coach. In December 2014, Stevens attended the Strictly Come Dancing Christmas special and Strictly Tour, a dance show in UK. In May 2015 all seven of the original members of S Club 7 reunited in an arena tour, entitled Bring It All Back 2015. On 12 March 2015, Stevens appeared on BBC Radio 1's Innuendo Bingo. In 2017 she appeared on the cast of Celebrity Masterchef. In December 2017, Stevens appeared on an episode of Celebrity Mastermind. In 2019 Stevens joined the Rip It Up The 70s theatre show with Louis Smith, Melody Thornton and Lee Ryan. In 2022, she competed in the fourteenth series of Dancing on Ice and was third to be eliminated.

On 9 November 2022, Stevens announced that she would be performing at Mighty Hoopla 2023, marking her first solo performance since 2005, but after the death of S Club member Paul Cattermole, she pulled out of the show. She began to perform on tour with the re-formed S Club, now a five-piece, from the fall of 2023 through the next year, dedicating the show to Cattermole. On 3 June 2024, she eventually performed a solo set at Mighty Hoopla 2024.

== Other ventures ==
=== Philanthropy ===
In 2005 Stevens fronted the Everyman Testicular Cancer Awareness campaign. Stevens's role was notable as she was the first woman to represent this campaign. Her television commercial raised eyebrows with its suggestive content that included her telling men to "put one hand down their trousers and give their testicles a good feel". On the commercial, Stevens commented, "Sometimes men need a little encouragement to think about their health. This is a funny way of raising awareness about a serious subject."

In 2005 Stevens also took part in the Make Poverty History campaign, which aims to eliminate poverty in developing countries by cancelling old debts, improving the way aid is given and removing barriers, so these countries can trade more effectively with the rest of the world. Stevens donated an undisclosed amount of money to the campaign, and also starred in television and magazine advertisements supporting the cause. Her official website also displayed the campaign's official online banner.

On 15 November 2011 it was reported that Stevens had recorded a collection of songs about fruit and vegetables as a way of helping to encourage children to eat five portions of fruit and veg per day. The songs were for an album titled Tasty Tunes and were made available as free downloads from the website of children's food firm Ella's Kitchen. Stevens launched the songs with a one-off performance at a nursery in Streatham, south London. The songs include food-themed versions of "Twinkle Twinkle Little Star" and "The Hokey-Cokey", and Stevens said of the project; "As a new mum, I'm always looking for exciting ways to encourage my daughter to try new foods, especially greens. I hope tasty tunes help lots of parents sing about fruit and vegetables as part of their little one's everyday playtime."

Stevens is also an ambassador to WaterAid, an organisation that promotes clean water in developing countries all over the world. During a 2012 trip to Ethiopia, Stevens remarked, "It was such a great feeling to see the women laughing and chatting while they were washing their clothes and drinking clean water. Everyone looked healthier and a lot happier and the village felt full of life."

=== Endorsement deals ===
Whilst in S Club 7 Stevens fronted the World Wide Fund for Nature. More recently, she has been the front woman for Pretty Polly, Sky Sports, Marks & Spencer, and Focus Dailies. In 2009, Stevens became the new ambassador for Schwarzkopf Herod Gliss hair products. In October 2011 Stevens fronted the launch of Seven Seas Health Oils.

== Personal life ==
In her earlier years in S Club, Stevens dated property developer Daniel Cohen for about two years. Later, Cohen stated he met Stevens socially a few times after their relationship ended, adding "she's an absolute darling, someone I haven't a bad word to say about". On Valentine's Day in 2002 Stevens became engaged to actor Jeremy Edwards. The relationship ended in early 2004. Stevens then dated Gavin Dein, son of former Arsenal vice-chairman David Dein. The relationship ended in August 2005. In September and October 2006 Stevens was linked to American-based English singer Oliver Trevena, known professionally as Oli T.

In June 2008, Stevens became engaged to her boyfriend of 18 months, Alex Bourne. The couple had planned to marry in the autumn of 2008, but postponed their wedding until 2 August 2009 due to Stevens' busy autumn schedule training and performing on Strictly Come Dancing. The wedding was Jewish. On 19 May 2010 the couple were expecting their first child. Her first daughter was born in 2010 and her second in 2014. In July 2022, Stevens announced on her Instagram that she and Bourne were divorcing.

Stevens has stated that she "observe[s] some of the (Jewish) holidays and I'll go to the synagogue on special occasions".

== Discography ==
- Funky Dory (2003)
- Come and Get It (2005)

== Filmography ==
=== Film ===
| Year | Title | Role | Notes |
|---|---|---|---|
| 2003 | Seeing Double | Rachel | |
| 2004 | Suzie Gold | Tina | |
| 2005 | Deuce Bigalow: European Gigolo | Louisa, the Dirty Girl | |
| 2005 | Spider-Plant Man | Jane–Mary | |
| 2008 | Glendogie Bogey | Patricia Ravelston | Voice role |

=== Television ===
| Year | Title | Role | Notes |
|---|---|---|---|
| 1999 | Miami 7 | Rachel | Main Role |
| 1999 | Back to the '50s | Rachel | Television film |
| 1999 | Boyfriends & Birthdays | Rachel | Television film |
| 1999 | The Greatest Store in the World | Herself | Television film |
| 2000 | L.A. 7 | Rachel | Main Role |
| 2000 | S Club 7 Go Wild! | Herself | Reality television |
| 2000 | Artistic Differences | Rachel | Television film |
| 2000 | Christmas Special | Rachel | Television film |
| 2001 | Hollywood 7 | Rachel | Main role |
| 2001 | S Club Search | Judge / Mentor | Reality television |
| 2002 | Viva S Club | Rachel | Main role |
| 2002 | Pop Idol | Guest mentor | Episode: "Will Young" |
| 2006 | Happy Hour | Herself | Episode: "Thanksgiving" |
| 2008 | Strictly Come Dancing | Contestant | Season 6 |
| 2009–2014 | Strictly Come Dancing | Herself | Christmas Specials |
| 2009 | The Sunday Night Project | Various roles | Episode: "Rachel Stevens and Joe Swash" |
| 2013 | The X Factor New Zealand | Mentor assistant | Season 1 |
| 2015–2016 | The Voice of Ireland | Judge / Mentor | Season 4–5 |
| 2017 | Celebrity MasterChef | Contestant | Series 12 |
| 2022 | Dancing on Ice | Contestant | Season 14 |

== Stage ==
| Year | Title | Role |
|---|---|---|
| 2019 | Rip It Up The 70s | Rachel |

== Concert tours ==
- Come and Get It Tour (2005)

== Awards and nominations ==
| Award | Year | Nominee(s) | Category | Result | Ref. |
|---|---|---|---|---|---|
| Brit Awards | 2000 | S Club | British Breakthrough Act | Won | |
| Brit Awards | 2000 | S Club | British Pop Newcomer | Nominated | |
| Brit Awards | 2000 | S Club | British Pop Act | Nominated | |
| Brit Awards | 2001 | S Club | British Pop Act | Nominated | |
| Brit Awards | 2002 | S Club | British Pop Act | Nominated | |
| Brit Awards | 2002 | "Don't Stop Movin'" | British Single of the Year | Won | |
| Brit Awards | 2004 | "Sweet Dreams My LA Ex" | British Single of the Year | Nominated | |
| Disney Channel Kids Awards | 2004 | Herself | Best UK Female Artist | Won | |
| Glamour Awards | 2005 | Herself | Woman of the Year | Won | |
| Popjustice £20 Music Prize | 2003 | "Say Goodbye" | Best British Pop Single | Nominated | |
| Popjustice £20 Music Prize | 2004 | "Some Girls" | Best British Pop Single | Won | |
| Popjustice £20 Music Prize | 2004 | "Sweet Dreams My LA Ex" | Best British Pop Single | Nominated | |
| Popjustice £20 Music Prize | 2005 | "Negotiate with Love" | Best British Pop Single | Nominated | |
| Popjustice £20 Music Prize | 2006 | "I Said Never Again (But Here We Are)" | Best British Pop Single | Nominated | |
| Top of the Pops Awards | 2003 | Herself | Most Gorge Girl | Nominated | |
| Top of the Pops Awards | 2003 | Herself | Singer of the Year | Nominated | |
| Top of the Pops Awards | 2003 | Herself | Best Newcomer | Nominated | |
| The Record of the Year | 1999 | "Bring It All Back" | Record of the Year | Nominated | |
| The Record of the Year | 2000 | "Reach" | Record of the Year | Nominated | |
| The Record of the Year | 2001 | "Don't Stop Movin'" | Record of the Year | Won | |
| The Record of the Year | 2003 | "Sweet Dreams My LA Ex" | Record of the Year | Nominated | |
| Virgin Media Music Awards | 2004 | Herself | Sexiest Female | Nominated | |
| Virgin Media Music Awards | 2005 | Herself | Babe of the Year | Won | |

| Year | Award | Category | Work | Result |
|---|---|---|---|---|
| 2003 | Smash Hits Awards | Best Dressed Star | Herself | Won |
| 2003 | National Music Awards | Favorite UK Female Singer | Herself | Won |
| 2004 | Smash Hits Awards | Best Dressed Star | Herself | Won |
| 2004 | Smash Hits Awards | Most Fanciable Female | Herself | Won |
| 2004 | Celebrity Awards | Sexiest Female Celebrity | Herself | Won |
| 2004 | Annual Showbusiness Awards | Recording Artist of the Year | Herself | Won |
| 2006 | Jammy Awards | Outstanding Female Singer | Herself | Won |
| 2009 | Digital Spy Reality Awards | Sexiest Female | Herself | Won |
| 2009 | Rear of the Year | Rear of the Year | Herself | Won |
| 2014 | FHM Awards | Sexiest Woman of All-Time | Herself | Won |

== Notes ==
1. Jamie Gill. Rachel Stevens 3. Rachel Stevens Online – originally from Yahoo! Launch. 7 October 2003. Retrieved 5 February 2006.
2. Azeem Ahmad. Rachel Stevens 5. MusicOMH. 8 December 2003. Retrieved 5 February 2006.
3. Rachel Stevens 6. Rachel Stevens Online – originally from HMV.co.uk. June 2004. Retrieved 5 February 2006.
4. Rachel Stevens 7. Rachel Stevens Online – originally from Yahoo! Launch. July 2004. Retrieved 5 February 2006.
5. Rachel Stevens 8. Rachel Stevens Online – originally from London News Review. 23 September 2004. Retrieved 5 February 2006.
6. Rachel Stevens 9. Virgin.net. 2005. Retrieved 6 February 2006.
7. Rachel Stevens 10. HMV.co.uk. Aug. 2005. Retrieved 6 February 2006.
8. Rachel Stevens 12. Rachel Stevens Online. 2006. Retrieved 29 January 2006.
9. Rachel Stevens 16. The Daily Record. 2006. Retrieved 1 May 2006.
10. Rachel Stevens 17. Everyman. 2005. Retrieved 29 January 2006.
11. Rachel Stevens 18. RSO: Make Poverty History. 2005. Retrieved 29 January 2006.
12. "Stephen 4 Stevens", The Daily Mirror. 2006. Retrieved 11 November 2006.
13. "Rach's Oli Nice Bloke", The Daily Mirror. 2006. Retrieved 11 November 2006.
