= List of Billboard number-one disco singles of 1978 =

The National Disco Action Top 40 was a chart published weekly by Billboard magazine in the United States, which ranked the popularity of disco singles in nightclubs across the country, based on a national survey of club disc jockeys.

== Chart history ==
Issue date	Song	Artist
January 7	Once Upon a Time... (all cuts)	Donna Summer
January 14	Once Upon a Time... (all cuts)	Donna Summer
January 21	"Supernature"/ "Give Me Love"/ "Love Is Here"	Cerrone
January 28	"Supernature"/ "Give Me Love"/ "Love Is Here"	Cerrone
February 4	"Supernature"/ "Give Me Love"/ "Love Is Here"	Cerrone
February 11	"Supernature"/ "Give Me Love"/ "Love Is Here"	Cerrone
February 18	"Let's All Chant"/ "Love Express"	Michael Zager Band
February 25	"Dance Little Dreamer"/ "Risky Changes"	Bionic Boogie
March 4	"Dance Little Dreamer"/ "Risky Changes"	Bionic Boogie
March 11	"Dance Little Dreamer"/ "Risky Changes"	Bionic Boogie
March 18	"Romeo and Juliet"	Alec R. Costandinos & the Syncophonic Orchestra
March 25	Come into My Heart (all cuts)	USA European Connection
April 1	Come into My Heart (all cuts)	USA European Connection
April 8	Voyage (all cuts)	Voyage
April 15	Voyage (all cuts)	Voyage
April 22	Voyage (all cuts)	Voyage
April 29	"If My Friends Could See Me Now"/ "Gypsy Lady"/ "Runaway Love"	Linda Clifford
May 6	"If My Friends Could See Me Now"/ "Gypsy Lady"/ "Runaway Love"	Linda Clifford
May 13	"If My Friends Could See Me Now"/ "Gypsy Lady"/ "Runaway Love"	Linda Clifford
May 20	"If My Friends Could See Me Now"/ "Gypsy Lady"/ "Runaway Love"	Linda Clifford
May 27	"If My Friends Could See Me Now"/ "Gypsy Lady"/ "Runaway Love"	Linda Clifford
June 3	"Last Dance"/ "After Dark"/ "Thank God It's Friday"/ "Take It to the Zoo"	Donna Summer/ Pattie Brooks/ Love & Kisses/ Sunshine
June 10	"Last Dance"/ "After Dark"/ "Thank God It's Friday"/ "Take It to the Zoo"	Donna Summer/ Pattie Brooks/ Love & Kisses/ Sunshine
June 17	"Last Dance"/ "After Dark"/ "Thank God It's Friday"/ "Take It to the Zoo"	Donna Summer/ Pattie Brooks/ Love & Kisses/ Sunshine
June 24	"Last Dance"/ "After Dark"/ "Thank God It's Friday"/ "Take It to the Zoo"	Donna Summer/ Pattie Brooks/ Love & Kisses/ Sunshine
July 1	"Last Dance"/ "After Dark"/ "Thank God It's Friday"/ "Take It to the Zoo"	Donna Summer/ Pattie Brooks/ Love & Kisses/ Sunshine
July 8	"Last Dance"/ "After Dark"/ "Thank God It's Friday"/ "Take It to the Zoo"	Donna Summer/ Pattie Brooks/ Love & Kisses/ Sunshine
July 15	"Boogie Oogie Oogie"	A Taste of Honey
July 22	"Boogie Oogie Oogie"	A Taste of Honey
July 29	"Boogie Oogie Oogie"	A Taste of Honey
August 5	"Hot Shot"	Karen Young
August 12	"Hot Shot"	Karen Young
August 19	"Dance (Disco Heat)"/ "You Make Me Feel (Mighty Real)"	Sylvester
August 26	"Dance (Disco Heat)"/ "You Make Me Feel (Mighty Real)"	Sylvester
September 2	"Dance (Disco Heat)"/ "You Make Me Feel (Mighty Real)"	Sylvester
September 9	"Dance (Disco Heat)"/ "You Make Me Feel (Mighty Real)"	Sylvester
September 16	"Dance (Disco Heat)"/ "You Make Me Feel (Mighty Real)"	Sylvester
September 23	"Dance (Disco Heat)"/ "You Make Me Feel (Mighty Real)"	Sylvester
September 30	"Keep on Jumpin'"/ "In the Bush"	Musique
October 7	"Keep on Jumpin'"/ "In the Bush"	Musique
October 14	Instant Replay (all cuts)	Dan Hartman
October 21	"MacArthur Park Suite"	Donna Summer
October 28	"MacArthur Park Suite"	Donna Summer
November 4	"MacArthur Park Suite"	Donna Summer
November 11	"MacArthur Park Suite"	Donna Summer
November 18	"MacArthur Park Suite"	Donna Summer
November 25	"Le Freak"/ "I Want Your Love"/ "Chic Cheer"	Chic
December 2	"Le Freak"/ "I Want Your Love"/ "Chic Cheer"	Chic
December 9	"Le Freak"/ "I Want Your Love"/ "Chic Cheer"	Chic
December 16	"Le Freak"/ "I Want Your Love"/ "Chic Cheer"	Chic
December 23	"Le Freak"/ "I Want Your Love"/ "Chic Cheer"	Chic
December 30	"Le Freak"/ "I Want Your Love"/ "Chic Cheer"	Chic

== See also ==
- 1978 in music
- List of Billboard Hot 100 number ones of 1978
