= Party Line (Andrea True Connection song) =

1976 song by Andrea True Connection

Single by Andrea True Connection

from the album More, More, More
- B-side: "Call Me"
- Released: 1976
- Genre: Disco
- Length: 3:22 (single version); 6:54 (album version)
- Label: Buddah Records
- Songwriter: Gregg Diamond
- Producer: Gregg Diamond

Andrea True Connection singles chronology
"More, More, More" (1976)	"Party Line" (1976)	"N.Y., You Got Me Dancing" (1977)

"Party Line" is a disco song written and produced by Gregg Diamond and performed by the Andrea True Connection. It was released as the second single from her album More, More, More in 1976. The song was a minor commercial success, only reaching lower regions of the US and Canadian charts. It received a positive review in the Cash Box magazine.

In 1976, Andrea sang the song on Don Kirshner's Rock Concert, along with "More, More, More" and "Fill Me Up (Heart to Heart)".

== Track listing ==
- 7" single
  1. "Party Line" – 3:22
  2. "Call Me" – 3:12

== Charts ==
Chart (1976)	Peak position
Canada (RPM 100 Top Singles)	90
US Billboard Hot 100	80
US Billboard Dance Music/Club Play	9
US Billboard R&B Singles	95
