= More, More, More (album) =

Studio album by Andrea True Connection
- Released: 1976
- Genre: Disco
- Length: 35:11
- Label: Buddah
- Producer: Gregg Diamond

Andrea True Connection chronology
More, More, More (1976)	White Witch (1977)

More, More, More is the first studio album by the group Andrea True Connection, released in 1976 by Buddah Records. It spawned the title song which became a hit in the charts. The album peaked at No. 47 on the Billboard sales chart in the U.S. and received favorable reviews.

== Background and production ==
During her heyday as a porn actress, around 1975, True was hired by a real estate business in Jamaica to appear in their commercials. While she was working there, the Jamaican government banned asset transfers in response to sanctions imposed by the U.S. after the election of Michael Manley, a supporter of Fidel Castro. In order to return to the U.S., True would have either to forfeit her pay or spend the money before she went home. True, who by this time was trying to break into the music industry, chose to invest the money in recording a demo of "More, More, More", a song she had been working on with record producer Gregg Diamond, her partner in a project called the Andrea True Connection. Remixed by recording engineer Tom Moulton, "More, More, More" became a favorite in nightclubs. Diamond then wrote and produced four other tracks which for Andrea's debut album, arranged in a disco style.

== Singles ==
The album's first single, "More, More, More", released at the turn of 1975 and 1976, went on to become a major hit, reaching No. 4 on the Billboard Hot 100 and No. 2 on the Dance Music/Club Play chart in the U.S. It peaked at No. 1 in Canada and No. 5 in the UK. "Party Line" was released later in 1976 to a minor chart success in the U.S. and Canada, reaching No. 80 and No. 90 in the national charts, respectively.

== Critical reception ==
Professional ratings
Review scores
Source	Rating
AllMusic	3/5 stars
Christgau's Record Guide	B

The album was described as a "strong disco set" which sounds "funky and professional" in a Billboard review, which also noted Diamond's "[g]ood arrangements" and True's "better than average voice". Record World described Gregg Diamond as the "mastermind" behind Andrea True Connection, praising him as the writer, producer, arranger, and instrumentalist, and noted that the title track was "bulleting up" the Singles Chart, while "Party Line" and "Keep It Up Longer" also had the "potential" to do the same, concluding: "It's disco . . . and more, more, more". Robert Christgau gave the album a B and wrote that "even if you haven't seen her movies, she projects an exhibitionistic suck-and-fuck tractability that links the two pervasive fantasy media of our time, and from such conjunctions Great Art arises".

The Record Mirror argued that the attraction of True's music "hasn't got much to do with her at all", noting that her "vocals only appear rarely" and that "she doesn't seem to have much of a range". The critic added that she might "sing a lot better—or sound better" if she were not "completely swamped by the musicians", suggesting that she was included "just to provide the pretty packaging". Although "More, More, More" had done well as a disco single, the review said that an entire album of similar material would not be "a big smash" because "it gets terribly boring after 10 minutes or so".

Stephen Cook from AllMusic wrote that "the Andrea True Connection's debut is a classic bit of polished dancefloor kitsch", and "a classic from the disco catalog" that "makes good on its one giant hit with a highly enjoyable and urbane array of dance tracks".

== Commercial performance ==
The album made its debut on the Cash Box Top Albums chart on June 19, 1976, at position 181. It reached its peak position of number 103 on July 31 of the same year. After a total of twelve weeks on the chart, the album made its final appearance on September 4, at number 195.

Making its debut on June 12, 1976, the album entered Record World's album chart at number 175. It climbed steadily to reach its peak position of number 88 on August 7. After a chart run of thirteen weeks, the album made its final appearance on the chart on September 4 of that year at number 133.

== Track listing ==
All tracks written by Gregg Diamond.

Side one
No.	Title	Length
1.	"Party Line"	6:50
2.	"Keep It Up Longer"	4:36
3.	"More, More, More"	6:15
Total length:		17:41

Side two
No.	Title	Length
1.	"Fill Me Up (Heart to Heart)"	10:03
2.	"Call Me"	7:28
Total length:		17:31

== Charts ==
Weekly charts for More, More, More
Chart (1976)	Peak position
Australia (Kent Music Report)	57
Canada (RPM Top Albums)	39
US Billboard 200	47
US R&B Albums (Billboard)	49
US Top Albums (Cash Box)	103
US The Album Chart (Record World)	88

== Personnel ==
Credits adapted from LP More, More, More.

- Arranged [String Arrangements] by Tony Post, Brad Baker
- Bass by Jim Gregory
- Creative Director – G.T.M. Productions, Inc.
- Creative Director [Creative Packaging Direction] – Milton Sincoff
- Drums by Gregg Diamond (tracks: A2, B1, B2)
- Engineer [Sundragon Studios] – Godfrey Diamond (tracks: A1, A2, B1, B2)
- Guitar – Steve Love (tracks: A1, A2, B1, B2)
- Horns by Joe Ferguson (tracks: A1, A2, B1, B2), Pete Ecklund* (tracks: A1, A2, B1, B2)
- Lacquer cut by TM/JR
- Mixed by Tom Moulton
- Percussion by Jimmy Maelen (tracks: A1, A2, B1, B2)
- Photography by Joel Brodsky
- Produced and arranged by Gregg Diamond
- All Songs Written by Gregg Diamond
- Vocals – Andrea True
