= N.Y., You Got Me Dancing =

1977 song performed by Andrea True

Single by Andrea True Connection

from the album White Witch
- B-side: "Keep It Up Longer"
- Released: 1977
- Genre: Disco
- Length: 3:40 (single version); 6:10 (album version)
- Label: Buddah Records
- Songwriter: Gregg Diamond
- Producer: Gregg Diamond

Andrea True Connection singles chronology
"Party Line" (1976)	"N.Y., You Got Me Dancing" (1977)	"What's Your Name, What's Your Number" (1977)

"N.Y., You Got Me Dancing" is a disco song written and produced by Gregg Diamond and performed by the Andrea True Connection. It was released as the first single from her 1977 album, White Witch. The song was a moderate chart success in the US, reaching #27 on the Billboard Hot 100, and #4 on the US club chart. It received a positive review from the Billboard magazine.

Andrea True performed the song on the German TV show Disco.

== Track listing ==
- 7" single

A. "N.Y., You Got Me Dancing" – 3:40
B. "Keep It Up Longer" – 4:36

== Charts ==
Chart (1977)	Peak position
Canada (RPM 100 Top Singles)	89
US Billboard Hot 100	27
US Billboard Dance Music/Club Play	4
