= Come and Get It (Rachel Stevens album) =

Studio album by Rachel Stevens
- Released: 17 October 2005
- Recorded: December 2004 – June 2005
- Genre: Pop
- Length: 45:11
- Labels: 19; Polydor
- Producers: Rob Davis; Jon Douglas; David Eriksen; Thomas Eriksen; Pascal Gabriel; Pete Hofmann; Jewels & Stone; Damian LeGassick; Mattias Lindblom; Hannah Robinson; Martin Sjølie; Fraser T Smith; Brio Taliaferro; Jeremy Wheatley; Anders Wollbeck; Richard X; Xenomania

Rachel Stevens chronology
Funky Dory (2003)	Come and Get It (2005)

Singles from Come and Get It
- 1. "Negotiate with Love" Released: 28 March 2005; 2. "So Good" Released: 4 July 2005; 3. "I Said Never Again (But Here We Are)" Released: 3 October 2005

Professional ratings
Review scores
Source	Rating
Allmusic	4.5/5 stars
BBC.co.uk	3.5/5 stars
Londonist	(positive)
MusicOMH	(positive)
Stylus Magazine	A−
Teentoday.co.uk	4/5 stars
The Daily Telegraph	(negative)
The Guardian	4/5 stars
Times Online	3/5 stars
Yahoo! Music	8/10 stars

Come and Get It is the second solo studio album by English singer Rachel Stevens, released on 17 October 2005 by 19 Recordings and Polydor Records. It spawned three singles, two of which reached the top 10, while the album itself reached number 28 on the UK Albums Chart. The album received almost universally positive reviews; two years after the album's release, The Guardian placed it on their "1000 Albums You Must Hear Before You Die" list.

== Overview ==
Three singles were released from Come and Get It during 2005; "Negotiate with Love", "So Good" and "I Said Never Again (But Here We Are)" as well as an earlier hit, "Some Girls" being included as a late addition. The first two of these charted in the UK at number 10, with the third at number 12. With a television advertising campaign, the album was released by Polydor Records on 17 October 2005, two weeks after the album's final single. Track "Nothing Good About This Goodbye" was announced as the next single in early 2006, with a single mix prepared and promo copies made, but these plans were scrapped.

The album was produced by a number of top record producers, including Xenomania, Richard X, Pascal Gabriel and Jewels and Stone. It reached number 28 in the United Kingdom, remaining of the charts for just two weeks. Come and Get It was not released in many territories outside the UK; in the United States, it was released on 26 June 2007 on iTunes.

The final two tracks, "Every Little Thing" and "Dumb Dumb" are listed on the album as 'bonus tracks', but appear on all versions of the album. "It's All About Me" features a sample from "Lullaby" by The Cure. Stevens herself co-wrote one song from the album; "Funny How".

== Critical reception ==
The album received critical acclaim from the music press. Writing for BBC Music, Talia Kraines wrote that it was "Bold, swaggering and accomplished...Quite simply, it's the pop album of the year." Mention was also made of the credibility of the music, stating that had the songs been done by another artist, they would be "lauded by critics". Allmusic made mention of the album's lack of success saying, "This utterly mediocre [chart] performance (in terms of its genre, at least) is astonishing when you consider that the album was masterminded by the finest songwriters and producers in the game...but its failure becomes utterly mind-boggling when you actually listen to the thing." Of the singles the review said they were "tremendous" and summed up the album as "a collection of 13 thoroughly excellent electronic dance-pop songs". Like many of the reviewers, Ben Hogwood of Music OMH said that almost every song on the album could be a single, but also made mention of the obvious low-involvement of Stevens herself in the making of the music. Edward Oculicz of Stylus acknowledged this but said it was simply a case of "Machiavellian record producers grabbing the best songs available for their favored daughter [and are] so endlessly delightful. You want continuity and consistency? Come And Get It is 13 quality electro-pop songs, all sung by the same woman. What more continuity do you need?"

Negative comments included that Stevens' vocals were rather lacklustre and emotionless, while David Cheal of The Telegraph said that "its 13 tracks drift by in a haze of nothingness; it is a masterpiece of insubstantiality." Yahoo Music, like a number of others, claimed the album as "one of the best albums of the year". The Guardian, while two years later lauding the album as an ignored classic, at the time said that it "deserves to be a hit. It is packed with brilliant, cutting-edge pop music". In 2007 they said that its lack of success was "the public's loss". Many reviews commented that the album was a big improvement on her debut, including Londonist who added that it was "a brilliant collection of sophisticated dancefloor songs and quite frankly, one of the most stunning albums of the year." As a summing up, the BBC music review concluded: "Come and Get It is quite simply a pop tour-de-force that deserves to sell a billion copies. Please, don't let this end up as a forgotten classic."

== Track listing ==
Standard edition
No.	Title	Writer(s)	Producer(s)	Length
1.	"So Good"	Hannah Robinson; Pascal Gabriel	Robinson; Gabriel; Jeremy Wheatley^{[b]}	3:14
2.	"I Said Never Again (But Here We Are)"	Julian Gingell; Barry Stone; Rob Davis	Jewels & Stone; Davis	3:26
3.	"Crazy Boys"	Robinson; Richard X	Richard X	3:52
4.	"I Will Be There"	Robinson; Gabriel; Paul Statham	Gabriel	4:03
5.	"Negotiate with Love"	Anders Wollbeck; Mattias Lindblom; Miriam Nervo; Olivia Nervo; Xyloman	Lindblom; Wollbeck; Pete Hoffman	3:07
6.	"All About Me^{[a]}"	Boris Williams; Fraser T Smith; Laurence Tolhurst; Porl Thompson; Richard Cardwell; Robert Smith; Roger O'Donnell; Simon Gallup	F. T Smith	3:30
7.	"Secret Garden"	Jon Douglas; Karen Poole	Douglas	3:59
8.	"Nothing Good About This Goodbye"	Alexis Strum; Brian Higgins; Nick Coler	Xenomania; Wheatley^{[b]}; Brio Taliaferro^{[b]}	3:34
9.	"Some Girls"	Robinson; Richard X	Richard X; Pete Hofmann^{[b]}	3:36
10.	"Je M'appelle"	Damian LeGassick; Shelly Poole	LeGassick	3:39
11.	"Funny How"	Rachel Stevens; Higgins; Lisa Cowling; Miranda Cooper; Coler; Tim Rowell	Xenomania; Higgins	4:14

UK bonus tracks
No.	Title	Writer(s)	Producer(s)	Length
12.	"Every Little Thing"	Gingell; Stone; Davis	Jewels & Stone; Davis	3:45
13.	"Dumb Dumb"	David Eriksen; J. Valentine; Nichols	D. Eriksen; Thomas Eriksen; Martin Sjølie	3:43

Bonus DVD
No.	Title	Length
1.	"Sweet Dreams My L.A. Ex"
2.	"Funky Dory"
3.	"Some Girls"
4.	"More More More"
5.	"Negotiate with Love"
6.	"So Good"
7.	"I Said Never Again (But Here We Are)"

=== Notes ===
- ^{^[a]} labeled as "It's All About Me" on digital editions of the album

== Personnel ==
- Eivind Aarset, Nick Coler, Shawn Lee and James Nisbet – guitar
- David Eriksen, Julian Gingell, Brian Higgins, Eliott James, Damian LeGassick, Tim Powell, Paul Statham, Barry Stone and Anders Wollbeck – keyboard
- David Eriksen, Priscilla Jones Campbell, Hannah Robinson, Barry Stone and Richard X - background vocals
- David Eriksen and Paul Statham – drum programming
- Adrian Bushby, Tommy D., Pete Hofmann, Tim Powell, Fraser Smith, Jeremy Wheatley and Anders Wollbeck – mixing
- Francesco Cameli, David Eriksen, Pete Hofmann and Fraser Smith – engineering
- Dave Clews, Julian Gingel, Eliott James, Tim "Rolf" Larcombe, Damian LeGassick, Tim Powell, Paul Statham, Barry Stone, Brio Taliaferro, Damian Taylor and Anders Wollbeck – programming
- Dick Beetham and Richard Dowling – mastering
- Paul West – art direction/design

== Charts ==
Chart (2005)	Peak position
Scottish Albums (Official Charts)	28
UK Albums (Official Charts)	28

== Release history ==
List of release dates, showing region, formats, and label
Region	Date	Format(s)	Label	Ref.
United Kingdom	17 October 2005	CD; digital download	Polydor Records	
