= Kimm Hekker =

Dutch singer

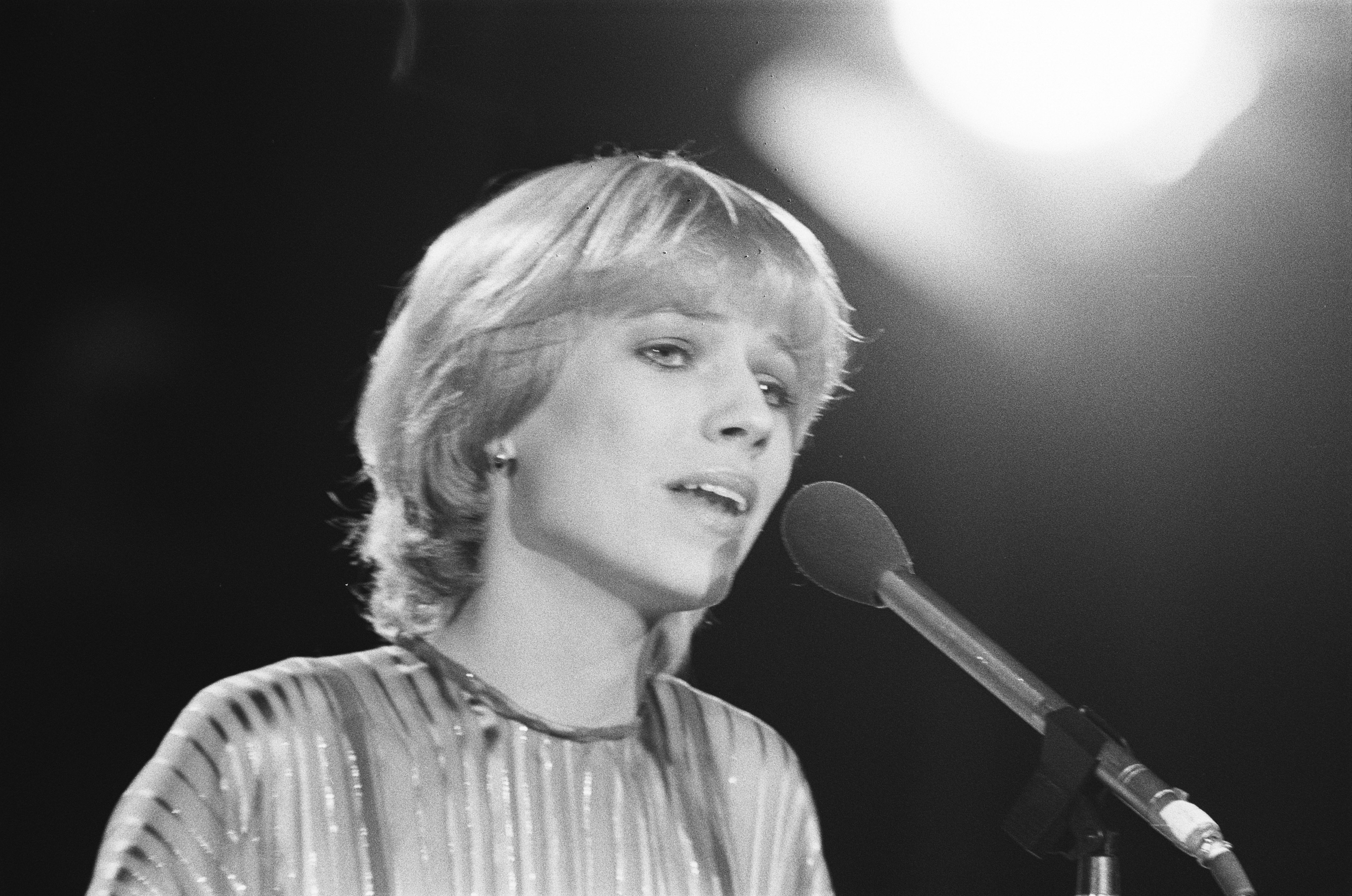
Kimm at the Nationaal Songfestival 1978

Corrie Hekker (1957 in Amsterdam), stage name Kimm or Kimm Hekker, is a Dutch singer, active 1976-1983. The duet of Stevie Nicks with Kenny Loggins "Whenever I Call You Friend" was televised by TopPop replacing Nicks by Kimm, which brought them a No.13 chart hit in 1978.

== Discography ==
Gimme a Break, album CBS Netherlands 1978.

A1 Jaimie
A2 This Is My Day
A3 Wind Of Change
A4 Gimme A Break
A5 Songbird
B1 Love's Destination
B2 What's His Name/What's His Number
B3 Might Have To Cry
B4 Will I See You Anymore
B5 House Of Strangers
