= Spider-Plant Man =

- Starring: Rowan Atkinson; Jim Broadbent; Mackenzie Crook; Nick Frost; Simon Pegg; Tony Robinson; Rachel Stevens
- Release date: 12 March 2005
- Running time: 14 minutes
- Country: United Kingdom
- Language: English

Spider-Plant Man is a British parody short film which parodies the 2002 film adaptation of the superhero character Spider-Man. The film was made for the Comic Relief 2005 appeal and aired on BBC One on 11 March 2005. It features Rowan Atkinson as Spider-Plant Man and Rachel Stevens as his love-interest Jane-Mary, a parody of Mary Jane Watson. Additionally, Jim Broadbent also made an appearance, portraying Batman, while Tony Robinson played Robin.

== Plot ==
Peter Piper, a photographer, visits a laboratory where scientists have created a carnivorous spider plant. After being bitten by one of these creatures, Piper develops plant-like powers. He uses his newfound abilities to rescue his former schoolmate Jane-Mary from a mugging, leading her to fall in love with him. Taking on the mantle of Spider-Plant Man, Piper embarks on a series of heroic feats throughout London, including retrieving demo tapes for Peter Andre.

One night, Spider-Plant Man encounters Batman, who has been overshadowed by Spider-Plant Man's popularity. Batman reveals that he has abducted Jane-Mary and threatens to kill her unless Spider-Plant Man renounces his superhero status. Spider-Plant Man deduces that Jane-Mary is trapped atop Tower Bridge and rushes to save her after recovering from a punch from Batman. Batman pursues him across public transport after the Renault Clio dubbed "The Bat-Clio" refuses to start, and they engage in a fierce battle that costs half of the budget for the entire film.

Batman's sidekick Robin arrives and nearly kills Spider-Plant Man. After Spider-Plant Man offers Robin a 25% cut on all licensed pajama sales as well as his own cereal brand with real little marshmallowy bits, Robin switches allegiances and defeats Batman. Spider-Plant Man proposes to Jane-Mary and tells her to choose between his superhero identity and his true self. The film ends with Jane-Mary on a beach with Piper in his Spider-Plant Man suit, implying that she chose the former.

== Cast ==
- Rowan Atkinson as Peter Piper / Spider-Plant Man
- Rachel Stevens as Jane-Mary
- Jim Broadbent as Batman
- Mackenzie Crook as Scientist
- Nick Frost as Scientist
- Simon Pegg as Frank Matters
- Peter Andre as Himself
- Tony Robinson as Robin
- Jason Watkins as Spectator at Tower Bridge
- Benedict Wong as Sweeper

== Development ==
Spider-Plant Man originated while Rowan Atkinson and some other writers were brainstorming ideas for a possible fifth series of Blackadder. One of these ideas was Batadder, a parody of Batman, where Atkinson would play the title character, and Robinson would play his sidekick based on Robin. Plans for the fifth Blackadder series eventually fell through and that particular idea gave rise to the Comic Relief special. Ed Bye of Red Dwarf fame directed the episode "Spider-Plant Man" and used CGI from The Farm and Steve Deakin-Davies' Ambition company.

== Reception ==
The film has been described as follows: "As the premise is utterly ridiculous it should be no surprise that the superhero movie archetype is ridiculed throughout", and called "a classic sketch."
