= What's Your Name, What's Your Number =

1977 song by Andrea True Connection

Single by Andrea True Connection

from the album White Witch
- B-side: "Fill Me Up (Heart to Heart)"
- Released: 1977
- Genre: Disco
- Length: 3:50 (single version); 6:35 (12" and album versions)
- Label: Buddah Records
- Songwriters: Bobby Wood, Roger Cook
- Producer: Michael Zager

Andrea True Connection singles chronology
"N.Y., You Got Me Dancing" (1977)	"What's Your Name, What's Your Number" (1977)	"War Machine" (1980)

"What's Your Name, What's Your Number" is a disco song written by Bobby Wood and Roger Cook and performed by the Andrea True Connection. It was released in 1977 as the second single from her second album, White Witch.

The song received a positive review in the Billboard magazine, which described it as "a strong disco/pop crossover tune [with] a subtle sexy treatment". It was moderately successful in the US and the UK, where it reached #56 and #34, respectively. In Italy, it was Andrea's highest-charting single, peaking at #15. She performed the song on the Italian TV program Discoring in 1977. In the same year, Cook also released his own version as a standalone single on Capricorn Records.

== Track listings ==
- 7" single

A. "What's Your Name, What's Your Number" – 3:50
B. "Fill Me Up (Heart to Heart)" – 3:38

- 12" single

A. "What's Your Name, What's Your Number" – 6:35
B. "Fill Me Up (Heart to Heart)" – 10:03

== Charts ==
Chart (1977–78)	Peak position
Italy (Musica e dischi)	15
UK Singles (OCC)	34
US Billboard Hot 100	56
US Billboard Dance Music/Club Play	9

== Cover versions ==
- Herb Reed recorded a cover of the song in 1977, released on the album Sweet River.
- Dutch singer Kimm Hekker covered the song as "What's His Name, What's His Number" in 1977. It later appeared on her album "Gimme a Break" (1978).
- Verónica Castro recorded the song in Spanish as "Cuál es tu nombre, cuál es tu número" on her 1978 album Sensaciones.
