= Sensaciones =

Studio album by Verónica Castro
- Released: 1978
- Recorded: 1978
- Genre: Pop
- Label: Peerless Records

Verónica Castro chronology
Verónica Castro (album) (1975)	Sensaciones (1978)	Aprendí a Llorar (1979)

Singles from Sensaciones
- 1. "Yo Quisiera Señor Locutor" Released: October 3, 1978

Sensaciones (Sensations) is the first album by Mexican pop singer Verónica Castro. It was released in 1978, selling more than one million units. "Mi Pequeño Ciclon" is a song for her son Cristian Castro.

== Track listing ==
1. "Yo Quisiera Señor Locutor" (Fabiola Del Carmen)
2. "¿Cuál es tu nombre, cuál es tu número?" What's Your Name, What's Your Number(Bobby Woods, Roger Cook, Lalo)
3. "Mi Corazón No Es Un Juguete" (Luis Cenobio Gobes)
4. "No Soy Monedita De Oro" (Cuco Sánchez)
5. "Pequeño Ciclón" (Manolo Marroqui)
6. "Soy Celosa" (Fabiola Del Carmen)
7. "Amigo" (Lalo Rodríguez)
8. "Sentimiento Festivo" And the Glory of the Lord (Handel, Gómez)
9. "Te Amo, Me Amas" (Chopin, Rodriguez)
10. "Adiós" (Juan Gabriel)

== Charts ==
#	Title
1.	"Sensaciones" Billboard Top Latin Albums (1979): North California #5, Chicago #5, Los Angeles #12, New York #14
