= Pretty Polly (hosiery) =

British hosiery brand

Pretty Polly is a British brand of women's tights based in Nottingham, Nottinghamshire, England.

== History ==
The company began in 1919 when Harry Hibbert and Oswald Buckland built a factory in Sutton-in-Ashfield, near Mansfield in Nottinghamshire. In 1926 they took over a hosiery wholesaling company that was previously owned by the daughter of a bookmaker who had gained financially from the racehorse Pretty Polly. The Pretty Polly trademark had a parrot as a logo, from another use of the word 'polly'. By 1957, the brand was number two in the UK and the company was bought by Thomas Tilling, who also owned much of the Walton Hosiery company in Sutton-in-Ashfield, which owned the Ballerina hosiery brand. The two companies were merged in 1961 as Pretty Polly Holdings Ltd.

=== Innovations ===
In 1959 the company introduced the first non-run seam-free stockings. To update the company's image in 1962, the parrot was replaced with two letter Ps and the phrase Pretty Polly for Pretty Legs forming a new [new what?] . In March 1967, hold-ups were introduced, which avoided the need for suspender belts, and were even featured on Tomorrow's World. It depended on the invention in 1899 of silicone by Professor Frederick Kipping at University College Nottingham. In the late 1960s, Pretty Polly was the best-selling range of hosiery in the UK, with a market share of 20%. In 1982, lycra (invented in 1959) was introduced.

=== Expansion ===
In 1967, an Irish subsidiary was opened at Killarney, to keep up with demand. In August 1991 the company was bought from BTR by the American Sara Lee Corporation for $187m who merged it with Elbeo in 1993. The company employed around 2,000 workers at this time. In 2005 when the company was owned by Sara Lee Courtaulds, production was moved from Unwin Road in Sutton in Ashfield to a 'state of the art' factory on Bridge Foot (A517) in Belper. In May 2006, Sara Lee sold all of its lingerie brands as part of a company known as Courtaulds Legwear.

=== Liquidation ===
Pretty Polly officially ceased trading and entered liquidation effective 14th May 2026.

== Advertising ==
Pretty Polly was the first hosiery company to advertise on TV in 1980. In 1994 Laura Bailey modelled for the company, then in 1998, Eva Herzigová became the face (and legs) of Pretty Polly advertising. Sara Cox also modelled their hosiery. In 1999 the company launched their first bras, known as bbras. In 2003, English singer Rachel Stevens became the face of PP advertising. In September 2014 it was announced that Sophie Ellis-Bextor would be the Face and Legs of Pretty Polly.

== Honours ==
In 2005, the company was honoured as a Superbrand by the Superbrands Council.

== See also ==
- Pretty Polly Stakes (Great Britain)
