= Funky Dory =

Studio album by Rachel Stevens
- Released: 29 September 2003
- Studios: London, England; Stockholm, Sweden
- Genre: Pop
- Length: 40:00
- Labels: Polydor; Universal
- Producers: Arnthor; BAG; Bloodshy & Avant; Yak Bondy; Ben Chapman; David Eriksen; Martin Harrington; Pete Hoffmann; Stephen Lipson; Wild Oscar; Michael Peden; B Rich; Richard X; Martin Sjølie; Brio Taliaferro; Jeremy Wheatley

Rachel Stevens chronology
| Funky Dory (2003) | Come and Get It (2005) |

Singles from Funky Dory
- 1. "Sweet Dreams My L.A. Ex" Released: 15 September 2003; 2. "Funky Dory" Released: 8 December 2003

Alternative cover
- 2004 re-issue artwork

Singles from Funky Dory (re-issue)
- 1. "Some Girls" Released: 12 July 2004; 2. "More, More, More" Released: 4 October 2004

Funky Dory is the solo debut album by English singer Rachel Stevens. It was released by Polydor Records on 29 September 2003 in the United Kingdom. The album was produced by various record producers, including Bloodshy & Avant and Richard X. Funky Dory received a positive reception from music critics who complimented its surprising diversity, charm and relative depth. It became Stevens' most successful album release, and reached number nine in the United Kingdom, where it was certified gold. On 16 July 2004, the album was reissued in the United Kingdom, including three new songs, and reached number thirteen on the UK Albums Chart.

== Critical reception ==
Professional ratings
Review scores
| Source | Rating |
|---|---|
| RTÉ | 3/5 stars |
| The Observer | 5/5 stars |

The Observer critic Peter Robinson called Funky Dory "an excellent album. It's stylish, decadent and temperamental, and it's teeming with melodrama: like a Geri Halliwell album, but not crap. And there's a total absence of desperation. While Halliwell's first album was about killing off Ginger, Stevens is not lumbered with any such task since, despite having spent half a decade as one of pop's biggest names, Rachel had no personality [...] Twelve-year-olds will rightly believe they're too old for S Club 8, but they won't be very impressed with the taut New Jill Swing of "I Got the Money", while the steely "Silk" (Erotica-era Madonna with Britney's "I'm a Slave 4 U" verse melody and a sudden, magnificent James Bond flourish in the middle eight) is cool and sassy but a massive Hi-NRG overhaul away from prompting a "Reach"-style amyl nitrate moment down at G-A-Y."

== Chart performance ==
Funky Dory debuted and peaked at number nine on the UK Albums Chart. The album was certified silver by the British Phonographic Industry (BPI) after three days and reached gold status on 10 October 2003. It descended from the top-seventy-five after six weeks. The albums re-issue debuted at number thirteen on the UK Albums Chart in 2004, selling 14,600 copies in its first week, becoming the hundred and eightieth best-selling album of 2004 in the UK. Together, both editions have sold over 110,000 copies in the UK.

== Track listing ==
| No. | Title | Writer(s) | Producer(s) | Length |
|---|---|---|---|---|
| 1. | "Sweet Dreams My L.A. Ex" | Cathy Dennis; Henrik Jonback; Christian Karlsson; Pontus Winnberg | Bloodshy & Avant | 3:28 |
| 2. | "Funky Dory" | David Bowie; Gary Clark; Martin Brammer | David Eriksen; Martin Sjølie | 3:12 |
| 3. | "Fools" | Anders Bagge; Arnthor Birgisson; Karen Poole | BAG & Arnthor | 3:13 |
| 4. | "Breathe In, Breathe Out" | Daniel Thørnqvist; Rikard Lögfgren | Stephen Lipson | 3:14 |
| 5. | "Glide" | Dennis; Karlsson; Jonback; Winnberg | Bloodshy & Avant | 3:38 |
| 6. | "Heaven Has to Wait" | Bagge; Birgisson; Dennis | Bloodshy & Avant | 4:10 |
| 7. | "Blue Afternoon" | Henrik Korpi; Mathias Johansson; Yak Bondy | Bondy | 4:14 |
| 8. | "I Got the Money" | Ben Chapman; Lucie Silvas; Martin Harrington | Chapman; Harrington | 4:05 |
| 9. | "Little Secret" | Dennis; Guy Chambers | Eriksen | 3:28 |
| 10. | "Solid" | Børge Petersen-Øverleir; Eriksen; Lisa Greene | Eriksen; Sjølie | 3:47 |
| 11. | "Silk" | Silvas; Michael Peden; Tom Nicholls | Peden | 3:36 |

United Kingdom edition and 2023 digital reissue bonus track
| No. | Title | Writer(s) | Producer(s) | Length |
|---|---|---|---|---|
| 12. | "Sweet Dreams My L.A. Ex" (Bimbo Jones Club Mix) | Dennis; Karlsson; Jonback; Winnberg | Bloodshy & Avant; Bimbo Jones^{[a]} | 6:46 |

2004 reissue
| No. | Title | Writer(s) | Producer(s) | Length |
|---|---|---|---|---|
| 1. | "Some Girls" | Hannah Robinson; Richard X | Richard X; Pete Hofmann^{[b]} | 3:34 |
| 2. | "Sweet Dreams My L.A. Ex" | Dennis; Jonback; Karlsson; Winnberg | Bloodshy & Avant | 3:28 |
| 3. | "Funky Dory" (single version) | Bowie; Clark; Brammer | Eriksen; Sjølie; Jeremy Wheatley^{[b]}; Brio Taliaferro^{[b]} | 3:13 |
| 4. | "Fools" | Bagge; Birgisson; Poole | BAG & Arnthor | 3:13 |
| 5. | "Breathe In, Breathe Out" (SWAT-Team version) | Thørnqvist; Lögfgren | Bob Robinson; Colin Wolfe; Dallas Austin; Xavier Hargrove | 3:14 |
| 6. | "Glide" | Dennis; Karlsson; Jonback; Winnberg | Bloodshy & Avant | 3:38 |
| 7. | "Heaven Has to Wait" | Bagge; Birgisson; Dennis | Bloodshy & Avant | 4:10 |
| 8. | "More, More, More" | Gregg Diamond | Wild Oscar | 3:33 |
| 9. | "Blue Afternoon" | Korpi; Johansson; Bondy | Bondy | 4:14 |
| 10. | "I Got the Money" | Chapman; Silvas; Harrington | Chapman; Harrington | 4:05 |
| 11. | "Little Secret" | Dennis; Chambers | Eriksen | 3:28 |
| 12. | "Solid" | Petersen-Øverleir; Eriksen; Greene | Eriksen; Sjølie | 3:47 |
| 13. | "Silk" | Silvas; Peden; Nicholls | Peden | 3:36 |

United Kingdom reissue bonus track
| No. | Title | Writer(s) | Producer(s) | Length |
|---|---|---|---|---|
| 14. | "Some Girls" (Rhythm Masters Vocal Mix) | Robinson; Richard X | Richard X; Hofmann^{[b]}; Rhythm Masters^{[a]} | 6:46 |

Notes

- ^{^a} denotes remixer
- ^{^b} denotes additional producer
- "More, More, More" is a cover of the song of the same name, originally performed by Andrea True.

== Charts ==
=== Weekly charts ===
| Chart (2003) | Peak position |
|---|---|
| Scottish Albums (Official Charts) | 7 |
| UK Albums (Official Charts) | 9 |

=== Year-end charts ===
| Chart (2003) | Position |
|---|---|
| UK Albums (OCC) | 165 |
| Chart (2004) | Position |
| UK Albums (OCC) | 180 |

== Certifications ==
| Region | Certification | Certified units/sales |
|---|---|---|
| United Kingdom (BPI) | Gold | 100,000^{^} |
^{^} Shipments figures based on certification alone.

== Release history ==
List of release dates, showing region, formats, label, and editions
| Region | Date | Format(s) | Label | Edition(s) |
|---|---|---|---|---|
| United Kingdom | 29 September 2003 | CD; digital download | Polydor | Original |
| Hong Kong | 9 March 2004 | CD; digital download | Polydor | Original |
| Canada | 16 March 2004 | CD; digital download | Polydor | Original |
| United Kingdom | 16 July 2004 | CD; digital download | Polydor | Re-release |
| United States | 26 June 2007 | CD; digital download | Polydor | Re-release |
