= War Machine (album) =

Studio album by Andrea True
- Released: 1980
- Genre: New wave, soft rock
- Length: 35:32
- Label: Ricordi International
- Producer: Andrea True

Andrea True chronology
White Witch (1977)	War Machine (1980)

War Machine is a 1980 studio album by Andrea True. It was her first and only solo LP, after two albums under the Andrea True Connection moniker released in the 1970s. War Machine was a departure from True's previous disco output, exploring new wave and rock music. The album is "dedicated to world peace and finding alternate solutions to energy problems and wars", with its title track carrying an anti-war message. The LP was released only in Italy by Italian label Ricordi International and was not commercially successful. It has never been released in any other format and is now a rare collectible item.

== Singles ==
The title track "War Machine" was released as a single by Ricordi International in Italy in 1980, and was accompanied by a music video. "Make My Music for Me" was released as a single by Atom in Austria the following year. For some unknown reason, the label changed the name of the song, which had appeared on the album as "Makin' Music for Money". Neither of the two singles was successful in music charts.

== Track listing ==
Side one
No.	Title	Writer(s)	Length
1.	"Open Up Baby"	Christopher Bruschi	3:00
2.	"Hootchie Kootchie Floozies"	Tony D'Ambra, Andrea True	4:20
3.	"The Unkindest Cut"	Tom Bakas, Gene Harlot, Andrea True	3:52
4.	"Whatever Happened to Love?"	Andrea True	4:18
Total length:			15:30

Side two
No.	Title	Writer(s)	Length
5.	"Makin' Music for Money"	Alexander Harvey	4:24
6.	"But Is That Love?"	Tom Bakas, Gene Harlot, Andrea True	3:28
7.	"Still Goin' Down"	Robert W. Brown	3:22
8.	"War Machine"	Robert W. Brown	4:48
9.	"Rock 'n Roll – Let It Go!"	Tom Carey	4:01
Total length:			20:03

== Personnel ==
- Andrea True – lead vocals, Moog, percussion, production
- Tony D'Ambra – backing vocals, drums
- Tom Bakas – backing vocals, guitar, bass
- Tom Carey – backing vocals, bass
- Jim Callen – backing vocals, bass
- Mark Lineberry – backing vocals, guitar
- Robert W. Brown – backing vocals, guitar
- Ralph Agresta – guitar
- Christopher Carroll – drums
- Chris Bruschi – bass
- Robert Simons – keyboards
- Elliot Apter – Moog

Tracks 1–6 recorded at Homegrown Studios, New Jersey, USA. Engineers: Robert Buontempo and Gary Pinckney.

Tracks 7–9 recorded at Media Studios, New York City, USA. Engineers: Godfrey Diamond and Michael Barbiero. Final mixes: Douglas Epstein. Final mix on track 7: Sam Ginsberg of Record Plant.
