= Negotiate with Love =

Single by Rachel Stevens

from the album Come and Get It
- B-side: "Queen"
- Released: 28 March 2005
- Genre: Dance-pop; electropop
- Length: 3:07
- Label: Polydor
- Songwriters: Anders Wollbeck; Mattias Lindblom; Xyloman; Miriam Nervo; Olivia Nervo
- Producers: Anders Wollbeck; Mattias Lindblom; Pete Hofmann

Rachel Stevens singles chronology
"More, More, More" (2004)	"Negotiate with Love" (2005)	"So Good" (2005)

"Negotiate with Love" is a song by English singer Rachel Stevens. It was released on 28 March 2005 as the lead single from her second studio album, Come and Get It (2005). The track was written by Anders Wollbeck, Mattias Lindblom, Xyloman and the Nervo Twins. It was produced by Anders Wollbeck, Mattias Lindblom and Pete Hofmann.

== Release ==
"Negotiate with Love" was released on 28 March 2005. The single peaked at number 10 on the UK Singles Chart.

== Music video ==
In the video, Stevens enters her flat and six clones of her are seen destroying anything that reminds her of her previous boyfriend. She even attempts to play golf on the table with some of his figurines. Her wardrobe in the video is a navy skirt and suit jacket. During the first chorus, Stevens removes the jacket revealing a pink sweater. The video, shot in London, was directed by Harvey and Carolyn, produced by Kate Phillips and commissioned by Cynthia Lole.

== Track list and formats ==
- CD 1
1. "Negotiate with Love" – 3:07
2. "Some Girls" (Europa XL radio mix) – 6:38
- CD 2
1. "Negotiate with Love" – 3:07
2. "Negotiate with Love" (Love to Infinity radio edit) – 3:45
3. "Queen" (Anders Hansson, Kara DioGuardi) – 3:32
4. "Interview" – 6:11
5. "Negotiate with Love" (CD-ROM video)
6. "Negotiate with Love" (karaoke video)
7. "Negotiate with Love" (PC game)
8. "Negotiate with Love" (ringtone)
- The Remixes
1. "Negotiate with Love" (Love to Infinity radio edit)
2. "Negotiate with Love" (Love to Infinity club mix)
3. "Negotiate with Love" (Tom Neville club radio edit)
4. "Negotiate with Love" (Tom Neville club mix)
- Digital Single
1. "Negotiate with Love" – 3:07
2. "Some Girls" (Europa XL Vocal Mix Edit) – 6:39

== Charts ==
Chart (2005)	Peak position
Ireland (IRMA)	27
UK Singles (Official Charts)	10
UK Singles Downloads (Official Charts)	22
