= I Said Never Again (But Here We Are) =

2005 single by Rachel Stevens

Single by Rachel Stevens

from the album Come and Get It
- B-side: "Waiting Game"; "Dumb Dumb"
- Released: 3 October 2005
- Genre: Dance-pop; electropop; electronic rock
- Length: 3:26
- Label: Polydor; 19
- Songwriters: Jewels & Stone; Rob Davis
- Producers: Jewels & Stone

Rachel Stevens singles chronology
"So Good" (2005)	"I Said Never Again (But Here We Are)" (2005)

"I Said Never Again (But Here We Are)" is a song by English singer-songwriter Rachel Stevens. It was released on 3 October 2005 as the third and final single from her second solo album Come and Get It. It was written by Rob Davis and Jewels & Stone who also produced it.

The song peaked at number 12 in the UK charts, making it Stevens' second single to miss the top ten after Funky Dory. However, the single received some of the best reviews of Stevens' career with it being hailed by HMV for its "astonishingly flawless vocal performance" and as Stevens' "most commercially accessible and quirky single since "Some Girls". The song was featured in the film Deuce Bigalow: European Gigolo. To date, it's Stevens' last single release.

== Track listings and formats ==
CD 1

1. "I Said Never Again (But Here We Are)" – 3:26
2. "Waiting Game" (Greg Kurstin, Hannah Robinson, Rachel Stevens) – 3:29

CD 2

1. "I Said Never Again (But Here We Are)" – 3:26
2. "Dumb Dumb" – 3:43
3. "I Said Never Again (But Here We Are)" (Bimbo Jones extended mix) – 7:02
4. "I Said Never Again" (PC game)
5. "I Said Never Again (But Here We Are)" (music video)

12-inch single

1. "I Said Never Again (But Here We Are)" (Jewels & Stone extended mix) – 5:02
2. "I Said Never Again (But Here We Are)" – 3:26
3. "I Said Never Again (But Here We Are)" (instrumental) – 3:26

Digital single

1. "I Said Never Again (But Here We Are)" (Jewels & Stone extended mix) – 5:03

== Charts ==
Chart (2005)	Peak position
Scottish Singles Sales (Official Charts)	8
UK Singles (Official Charts)	12
