= Andrea True =

American singer and pornographic actress (1943–2011)

- True performing in 1976

Background information
- Born: Andrea Marie Truden (alternative: Andreja Marija Truden); July 26, 1943; Nashville, Tennessee, U.S.
- Died: November 7, 2011 (aged 68) Kingston, New York, U.S.
- Genres: Disco; pop; rock
- Occupations: Pornographic actress; singer; producer
- Instrument: Vocals
- Years active: 1972–1995
- Label: Buddah

Andrea Marie Truden (July 26, 1943 – November 7, 2011), better known by her pseudonym Andrea True, was an American disco singer and pornographic actress. In addition to her given name, she had multiple stage names, including Inger Kissin, Singe Low, Sandra Lips, Andrea Travis, and Catherine Warren. As a singer, she is best known for the 1976 disco hit "More, More, More" (performed as part of her recording project the Andrea True Connection), which peaked at no. 4 on the US Billboard Hot 100 and no. 5 on the UK singles chart.

== Early life ==
Andrea Marie Truden was born in Nashville, Tennessee, where she attended St. Cecilia Academy, a Catholic school for girls dedicated to the performing arts. She studied music at George Peabody College, later part of Vanderbilt University. Her father, Frank, was an engineer, and he died when True was 16 years old. Her mother Anne owned a silverplating business and was a professional singer, specializing in polka, who recorded her own record and had performed with Frankie Yankovic's band. Her parents were immigrants from Slovenia.

As a child, True studied classical piano and was given a high rating for her piano audition for St. Cecilia Academy in 1954. At age 15, she hosted her own television program Teen Beat for Nashville station WLAC. While a junior at St. Cecilia, True participated in Junior Achievement, serving as vice-president of a TV production enterprise. In 1960, she received an award for her work from the Radio and Television Council of Middle Tennessee.

In a recorded interview published by The Rialto Report, True stated that she married David L. Wolfe at age 19, leaving college to follow her husband for his academic career, first to Oklahoma and then eventually to New York City in the late 1960s.

== Career ==
True performed in a few pornographic films in Scandinavia in the 1960s and, by the end of the decade, began appearing in American adult films. Her first prominent role was in the film Head Nurse in 1972. She also appeared as an extra in non-adult films The Way We Were and 40 Carats. In 1975, she directed her first pornographic film, Once Over Nightly. Eventually, she performed in more than fifty hardcore porn films throughout the 1970s and early to mid-1980s in the early New York adult film industry.

During her heyday as a porn actress, around 1975, True was hired by a real estate business in Jamaica to appear in their commercials. While she was working there, the Jamaican government banned asset transfers in response to sanctions imposed by the U.S. after the election of Michael Manley, a supporter of Fidel Castro. In order to return to the U.S., True would have had to either forfeit her pay or spend the money before she went home. True, who by this time was trying to break into the music industry, chose to invest the money in recording a demo of "More, More, More", a song she had been working on with record producer Gregg Diamond, her partner in a project called The Andrea True Connection. Remixed by recording engineer Tom Moulton, "More, More, More" became a favorite in nightclubs. It reached no. 4 on the U.S. Billboard Hot 100, no. 1 on the U.S. disco chart, and no. 1 on the national singles chart in Canada. It also peaked at no. 5 in the UK and no. 9 in Germany. A full album with the same title followed, which performed moderately in North America and spawned the second single, "Party Line", a minor chart hit.

"Forget Donna Summer—this is the real disco porn. She's covered on the cover right up to the clavicle, her rhythms sound more binary than her producer's, and she can't sing a lick. But even if you haven't seen her movies, she projects an exhibitionistic suck-and-fuck tractability that links the two pervasive fantasy media of our time, and from such conjunctions Great Art arises."

— More, More, More, reviewed in Christgau's Record Guide: Rock Albums of the Seventies (1981)

By the time of her singing career, True admitted she was burned out and tired of porn, saying, "I'd rather be a waitress or a typist than make another adult film", and also, "Don't think of me as a porn star anymore, think of me as a recording star. I just want to record and perform". She was performing extensively and went on to play around 300 shows within a year from June 1976. Andrea True Connection came fifth in ASCAP's ranking of disco artists of the year.

In early 1977, True released the single "N.Y., You Got Me Dancing". It became a considerable hit, reaching no. 27 on Billboard's pop chart and no. 4 on the disco chart. In early 1978, she had another hit with "What's Your Name, What's Your Number", which peaked at no. 56 in the U.S. and no. 34 in the UK. Both singles were included in her second album, White Witch. It was a commercial flop and did not chart due to a lack of promotion from Buddah Records as the label was struggling financially at the time. In 1980, she released her third and final album, War Machine, promoted by the anti-war title song. A more rock and new wave-oriented album, it was released only in Europe, but it performed poorly.

True never returned to the adult film industry and for some time performed in clubs in Florida. After that, a growth developed on her vocal cords that required surgery, essentially ending her singing ability. She did, however, perform two sold-out shows at the Paramount Theater in New York City in 1994, and worked on new music, which eventually never materialised. True received a renewed burst of publicity in 1999 when the Canadian group Len sampled the instrumental break from "More, More, More" in their single "Steal My Sunshine". Subsequently, True appeared on several VH1 specials including 100 Greatest Dance Songs in 2000 ("More, More, More" was the no. 45 greatest dance song), Where Are They Now? and 100 Greatest One-Hit Wonders (both in 2002), in which she said she wanted "to be remembered as someone who brought people joy" — then emphasized the words "with her music". She also made an appearance in the 2005 documentary movie Inside Deep Throat.

== Later years ==
In her later years, she was reported as working as a counselor for those struggling with substance abuse and an astrologer. "More, More, More" remained a popular song on TV and in movies, and True was eventually able to claim and live on outstanding royalties from the track's usage and sales. She spent her final years living in Woodstock, New York, suffering from declining health.

True died on November 7, 2011, at a hospital in Kingston, New York. She was 68, and the cause of death was given as heart failure. In line with her wishes, her body was cremated.

== Discography ==
=== Albums ===
List of studio albums, with selected chart positions
Title	Album details	Peak chart positions			
Title	Album details	US	US R&B	AUS	CAN
More, More, More	Released: 1976; Label: Buddah Records; Formats: LP, cassette, CD, digital download, streaming	47	49	57	39
White Witch	Released: 1977; Label: Buddah Records; Formats: LP, cassette, CD, digital download, streaming	—	—	—	—
War Machine	Released: 1980; Label: Ricordi International; Formats: LP, cassette	—	—	—	—
"—" denotes releases that did not chart or were not released in that territory.

=== Singles ===
Year	Single	Peak chart positions										Album
Year	Single	US	US Disco	US R&B	AUS	CAN	GER	IRE	ITA	NZ	UK	Album
1976	"More, More, More"	4	1	23	19	1	9	6	24	25	5	More, More, More
1976	"Party Line"	80	4	95	—	90	—	—	—	—	—	More, More, More
1977	"N.Y., You Got Me Dancing"	27	4	—	—	89	—	—	—	—	—	White Witch
1977	"What's Your Name, What's Your Number"	56	9	—	78	—	—	—	15	—	34	White Witch
1980	"War Machine"	—	—	—	—	—	—	—	—	—	—	War Machine
1981	"Make My Music for Me"	—	—	—	—	—	—	—	—	—	—	War Machine
"—" denotes releases that did not chart or were not released in that territory.

== Partial filmography ==
- Head Nurse (1972)
- Meatball (1972)
- Devil's Due (1973)
- Madame Zenobia (1973)
- Deep Throat Part II (1974)
- Illusions of a Lady (1974)
- Lady on the Couch (1974)
- The Chamber Maids (1974)
- The Seduction of Lynn Carter (1974)
- French Wives (1975)
- Hot Channels (1975)
- Christy (1975)
- Keep on Truckin (1975)
- Every Inch a Lady (1975)
- Once Over Nightly (1975; also director)
- Millionairess (1975)
- Erotic Adventures of Little Orphan Sammy (1976)
- Mash'd (1976; also director)
- Winter of 1849 (1976)
- Summer Session (1978)
- Debbie Does Las Vegas (1979)
