= So Good (Rachel Stevens song) =

2005 single by Rachel Stevens

Single by Rachel Stevens

from the album Come and Get It
- B-side: "Breathe In Breathe Out" (remix); "Never Go Back"
- Released: 4 July 2005
- Studio: Wandsworth (London, England)
- Genre: Dance-pop; electropop
- Length: 3:13
- Label: Polydor; 19
- Songwriters: Pascal Gabriel; Hannah Robinson
- Producers: Pascal Gabriel; Hannah Robinson

Rachel Stevens singles chronology
"Negotiate with Love" (2005)	"So Good" (2005)	"I Said Never Again (But Here We Are)" (2005)

"So Good" is a song by English singer-songwriter Rachel Stevens. It was released as the second single from her second solo album, Come and Get It (2005). It was written and produced by Pascal Gabriel and Hannah Robinson. The song was released on 4 July 2005 as a CD single and digital download. It debuted and peaked at number 10 on the UK Singles Chart, becoming Stevens' fifth top-10 single and her last top 10 as of 2026.

== Background ==
The song was recorded at Wandsworth Studios which was shown on Stevens' television documentary "Rachel Stevens: My World" and was one of the first songs that she recorded for the album. Stevens stated in the documentary that the song had helped her "find her sound for the album". The track was mixed at 21 Studios in London for its release.

== Critical reception and release ==
The song received positive reviews from music critics who praised its production and Stevens' vocals, with some labelling it as "much ahead of its time". Some critics described it as the "I Will Survive of the 21st century" due its lyrical content in which Stevens declares that she has "made it on her own again" and will "feel so good" after ending a relationship.

"So Good" was released on 4 July 2005 as two CD singles and a digital download in the United Kingdom. The first CD contains a radio edit of the track and a Milky vocal mix of "Breathe In, Breathe Out" and the second CD also contains a radio edit, an Aurora Vocal mix, a previously unreleased track "Never Go Back" and an enhanced section that contains the music video, karaoke video and game.

== Commercial performance ==
After Stevens' previous single "Negotiate with Love" peaked at number 10 on the UK Singles Chart, expectations were high for "So Good" to chart higher due to stronger radio airplay and receiving more positive reviews. However, it failed to do so and also peaked at number 10, lasting eight weeks on the chart, a week longer than "Negotiate with Love". As of 2026, it is Stevens's last single to peak within the top 10.

== Music video ==
=== Background ===
Prior to the video's release, a behind the scenes for the video was shown on GMTV. The music video for "So Good" was directed by Cameron Casey and was filmed in June 2005 at a studio in London.

=== Synopsis ===
The video features Stevens with a group of four men in a dark metallic room, dancing in front of a wall of flashing coloured lights. In some scenes, Stevens is lying on a circular shaped stage with the flashing lights in the background and other scenes show the four men dancing individually on the stage. Throughout the video, there are many close-up shots of Stevens with the lights behind her. During the bridge of the song, Stevens and the four men do a fast robot styled dance routine. In the video, she has a braided hairstyle and is wearing a black ballerina-like dress and sports pink mid-hand gloves.

=== Reception ===
The pink mid-hand gloves Stevens wore in the video gained a cult following because of the British pop website Popjustice, where they were the subject of a front-page article and a special message board discussion forum. In an interview with GMTV, Stevens stated that the pink gloves were to give the outfit some colour and also due to the hand orientated dance routine.

== Track listings ==
CD single

1. "So Good" (radio edit) – 3:13
2. "Breathe In Breathe Out" (Milky vocal mix) – 5:57

CD maxi single

1. "So Good" (radio edit) – 3:13
2. "So Good" (Aurora vocal mix) – 7:32
3. "Never Go Back" (Hannah Robinson, Johnny Pearson, Martin Buttrich, Rachel Stevens) – 3:19
4. "So Good" (video)
5. "So Good" (karaoke video)
6. "So Good" (game)
7. "So Good" (ringtone)

Digital EP

1. "So Good" (radio edit) – 3:14
2. "So Good" (Aurora vocal mix) – 7:32
3. "Never Go Back" – 3:21

Digital single

1. "So Good" (radio edit) – 3:14
2. "Breathe In Breathe Out" (Milky vocal mix) – 5:59

== Charts ==
Chart (2005)	Peak position
Ireland (IRMA)	27
Scottish Singles Sales (Official Charts)	7
UK Singles (Official Charts)	10

== Release history ==
Region	Date	Format	Label	Ref.
United Kingdom	4 July 2005	CD single	Polydor	
United Kingdom	4 July 2005	Digital download	Polydor	
