= Dance Little Dreamer =

Single by Bionic Boogie
- B-side: "Feel Like Dancing"
- Released: April 15, 1978
- Genre: Disco
- Length: 3:40
- Label: Polydor
- Songwriter: Gregg Diamond
- Producer: Gregg Diamond

Bionic Boogie singles chronology
"Dance Little Dreamer" (1978)	"Risky Changes" (1978)

"Dance Little Dreamer" is a 1978 disco single by Bionic Boogie, a group created by disco producer, Gregg Diamond and was included in Bionic Boogie's, self-titled, 1978 album. "Dance Little Dreamer", along with the track, "Risky Changes" made it to number one on the Billboard Hot Dance Club Play disco charts for three weeks. Despite the popularity of the album cuts, both failed to make both the soul and pop singles chart.
