= Sweet Dreams My L.A. Ex =

2003 single by Rachel Stevens

Single by Rachel Stevens

from the album Funky Dory
- B-side: "Little Secret"
- Released: 15 September 2003
- Studio: Murlyn (Stockholm, Sweden)
- Genre: Pop
- Length: 3:28
- Label: Polydor; 19
- Songwriters: Cathy Dennis; Christian Karlsson; Pontus Winnberg; Henrik Jonback
- Producer: Bloodshy & Avant

Rachel Stevens singles chronology
| "Sweet Dreams My L.A. Ex" (2003) | "Funky Dory" (2003) |

"Sweet Dreams My L.A. Ex" is a song by English singer-songwriter Rachel Stevens. It was released on 15 September 2003 as the lead single from her debut solo album, Funky Dory. Originally written for Britney Spears, the song was produced by Swedish duo Bloodshy & Avant. The single is Stevens's most successful single to date, peaking at number two on the UK Singles Chart. It was the 22nd-best-selling single of 2003 in the United Kingdom and has sold over 284,000 copies in the UK as of September 2021. Worldwide, the single peaked at number two in Denmark and earned a gold certification in Norway, where it reached number five.

== Composition and inspiration ==
"Sweet Dreams My L.A. Ex" was written by Cathy Dennis, the lyrics were inspired by Justin Timberlake's "Cry Me a River", which is believed to be aimed at Britney Spears, his ex-girlfriend. Originally the instrumental for the song was utilized in a track called "Phoney Lullaby", after Phoney Lullaby, the track was altered as a track called "Topbillin' Love", which was again rejected. The song was revised again as 'Sweet Dreams My L.A. Ex'. The lyrics are a message to the famous ex-lover who has talked about the relationship and break-up in public, with the person in the song now taking the time to deliver their side of the story.

"If I were in your shoes
I'd whisper before I shout
Can't you stop playing that record again?
Find somebody else to talk about
If I were in your shoes
I'd worry of the effects
You've had your say but now it's my turn
Sweet dreams my L.A. Ex"

The person in the song wishes their ex "sweet dreams", but accuses them of using the break-up to further themselves. Originally the song was written by Dennis for Spears, who turned it down due to its subject matter. A few months later, Dennis still had not found someone to perform the song and offered it to Stevens, whom she had worked with when Stevens was a member of S Club 7. At the time Stevens had just begun work on her debut solo album and thought the song, which did not sound like anything out at the time, would make a good first single. Stevens said of the song in an interview, "The writers really got my personality and the direction I want to go in," she said. "The first single is a great example – the first time I heard it I knew it's what I wanted." In an interview, Stevens revealed that she recorded the song two weeks after S Club 7 announced their spilt.

The song is composed in a key of A, utilizing the Phrygian mode, while the underlying chords imply the Phrygian dominant scale.

== Critical reception ==
"Sweet Dreams My L.A. Ex" received mixed to positive reviews from music critics. The BBC called the song "perfectly pleasant" but "unlikely to set the world alight, despite heavy rotation on radio and TV". The review also went on to say that while Stevens is popular, she will "need stronger material than this to maintain a pop career past her first album".

Jamie Gill, in a review for Dotmusic, called the song "utterly addictive", while Amazon.co.uk called the song "sassy" and full of "feminine confidence". In a separate review on Amazon.com, Georgina Collins, called the song a "corker of a popsong", praising it for being catchy and fun to listen to.

The song was also nominated for ITV's annual Record of the Year prize, finishing 6th behind Westlife who won with their cover of Barry Manilow's "Mandy", and was also nominated at the 2004 BRIT Awards for Best British Single, losing out to Dido with her song "White Flag".

== Chart performance ==
"Sweet Dreams My L.A. Ex" was a commercial success in the United Kingdom, debuting at number two on the UK Singles Chart, being held off from number-one by "Where Is the Love?" by Black Eyed Peas. It stayed in this position for two non-consecutive weeks, with a further three inside the top 10. Elsewhere in Europe, the song also went on to be a commercial success, reaching the top ten in Denmark, Ireland, and Norway. Despite receiving minor airplay, "Sweet Dreams My L.A. Ex" was not released in the United States.

In December 2003, the single was certified Silver for sales of 200,000 in the UK. By the end of 2003, the song was ranked the 22nd-best-selling single of the year in the United Kingdom. To date, the song has remained Stevens' biggest success worldwide, with her follow-up singles charting well out of the top 10 worldwide. In the UK, only "Some Girls" and "More, More, More" were able to live up their predecessor's success, with "Negotiate with Love" and "So Good" only just breaking the top 10.

== Music video ==
The music video for "Sweet Dreams My L.A. Ex" was released prior to the single's commercial release. It was directed by Tim Royes and filmed at Royal Studios in North London.

The video cuts between three main sequences, the first with Stevens in an enclosed glass box, representing that she is trapped in a relationship that she no longer wants to be a part of. From inside she signs to the camera, hits the walls and at one point takes off her high heels and angrily throws them down. In the second sequence her backing dancers tie her up in a red ribbon and trap her, which she fights against and breaks free. The third sequence sees Stevens singing to her "L.A. Ex", telling him that she no longer wants to be with him; the video ends with her walking away from the man and leaving the relationship.

At first Stevens was unsure about the idea when the choreographer told her of the plans for the video but she soon warmed up to it, "It was strange at first but I like it because it's something new and looks great on stage." The video was slightly edited for the rest of Europe.

== Track listings ==
UK CD and cassette single

1. "Sweet Dreams My L.A. Ex" – 3:27
2. "Little Secret" – 3:26
3. "Sweet Dreams My L.A. Ex" (BMR Peaktime mix) – 6:15

European CD single

1. "Sweet Dreams My L.A. Ex" – 3:27
2. "Little Secret" – 3:26

European maxi-CD single

1. "Sweet Dreams My L.A. Ex" – 3:27
2. "Little Secret" – 3:26
3. "Sweet Dreams My L.A. Ex" (BMR Peaktime mix) – 6:15
4. "Sweet Dreams MY L.A. Ex" (video) – 3:27

== Personnel ==
Personnel are lifted from the European CD single liner notes.

- Songwriting – Cathy Dennis, Christian Karlsson, Pontus Winnberg, Henrik Jonback
- Production, arrangement, recording and instrument programming – Bloodshy & Avant
- Mixing – Niklas Flyckt
- Mixing assistant – Jonas Östman
- Guitar – Henrik Jonback
- Backing vocals – Jeanette Olsson, Cathy Dennis
- Mastering – Richard Dowling

== Charts ==
=== Weekly charts ===
| Chart (2003–2004) | Peak position |
|---|---|
| Belgium (Ultratop 50 Flanders) | 25 |
| Denmark (Tracklisten) | 2 |
| Europe (Eurochart Hot 100) | 7 |
| Germany (GfK) | 64 |
| Ireland (IRMA) | 3 |
| Netherlands (Single Top 100) | 79 |
| Norway (VG-lista) | 5 |
| Romania (Romanian Top 100) | 95 |
| Scottish Singles Sales (Official Charts) | 2 |
| Sweden (Sverigetopplistan) | 24 |
| Switzerland (Schweizer Hitparade) | 63 |
| UK Singles (Official Charts) | 2 |

=== Year-end charts ===
| Chart (2003) | Position |
|---|---|
| Ireland (IRMA) | 55 |
| UK Singles (OCC) | 22 |

== Certifications ==
| Region | Certification | Certified units/sales |
|---|---|---|
| Norway (IFPI Norway) | Gold | 5,000^{*} |
| United Kingdom (BPI) | Silver | 284,000 |
^{*} Sales figures based on certification alone.
