= Some Girls (Rachel Stevens song) =

2004 single by Rachel Stevens

Single by Rachel Stevens

from the album Funky Dory (re-issue)
- B-side: "Spin That Bottle"
- Released: 12 July 2004
- Studio: Supasound (London, England)
- Genre: Synth-pop; dance-pop; electropop
- Length: 3:32
- Label: 19; Polydor
- Songwriters: Richard X; Hannah Robinson
- Producers: Richard X; Pete Hoffman

Rachel Stevens singles chronology
| "Funky Dory" (2003) | "Some Girls" (2004) | "More More More" (2004) |

"Some Girls" is a song by English singer Rachel Stevens from the 2004 reissue of her debut solo studio album, Funky Dory (2003). It was written by Richard X and Hannah Robinson, and produced by the former, with additional production from Pete Hoffman. It was also included on Stevens' second studio album, Come and Get It (2005). The song's music features a schaffel beat influenced by glam rock, and its lyrics describe a pop singer who performs sexual favours in her efforts to achieve stardom.

The song was released on 12 July 2004 as a charity single for Sport Relief. "Some Girls" entered and peaked at number two on the UK Singles Chart. Paul Weiland directed the accompanying music video, in which Stevens leads a parade of women out of the sewers and down the streets of London. American dance musician Henri released a cover version of "Some Girls" as a single in 2006. The song was recognised as the Best Pop Record of 2004 through the Popjustice £20 Music Prize.

== Background and writing ==
"Some Girls" was written by producer Richard X and songwriter Hannah Robinson. They spent several days working on the song, with girl group Girls Aloud in mind as potential performers. Warp Records and Simon Fuller of 19 Entertainment contacted Richard X by email to ask that he give the song to Geri Halliwell or Stevens, respectively, to record. He agreed to have Stevens record the song after Richard Curtis asked about using the song for Sport Relief 2004. Richard X later stated that he was surprised Sport Relief chose such a sexually suggestive song. The aftermath of the decision for Stevens to record the song became the subject of another song written by Richard X and Robinson, "Me Plus One", from Annie's 2004 album Anniemal. While recording with Stevens, Richard X decided to get spoken soundbites from her to make an extended version for the single's B-side. To fit the song's glam sound, he asked her questions about the Winter of Discontent, to which Stevens reacted with "bemusement and terror."

"Some Girls"
The song uses a heavily swung electronic rhythm.

The lyrics of "Some Girls" describe a pop singer's dreams of stardom. She performs fellatio on a man promising to make her a star. Richard X explained that he wanted to illustrate how the music industry treats people, so he and Robinson based some of the song's lines on anecdotes that they had heard.

According to AllMusic the song is "excellent electronic dance-pop", using Richard X's "icy" synth-pop sound. The synthesiser used was a Fairlight CMI Series IIx previously owned by pop group the Thompson Twins. It also features the German schaffel beat popularized by glam rock. Reviewers compared the song's glam-influenced sound to T. Rex's 1971 single "Hot Love" and the work of Adam Ant. They also noted similarities between "Some Girls" and the more recent electronic glam music on Goldfrapp's 2003 album Black Cherry, in particular the track "Strict Machine" to which "Some Girls" was described as "startlingly similar" by the Manchester Evening News. Goldfrapp had given X an unmixed copy of their song to remix only to reject his efforts; shortly thereafter he wrote the song for Stevens.

== Critical reception ==
"Some Girls" received acclaim from music critics. PopMatters included it in its "Best Music of 2004" selection, where Adrien Begrand commented that "Stevens might have no singing voice to speak of, but did she ever score a slice of pop genius with her single 'Some Girls', on which the ever-crafty Richard X brazenly hijacks a contagious German schaffel beat and tarts it up with a killer hook in the chorus that never, ever leaves your head". In his review for The Guardian, Alexis Petridis referred to the song as "remarkable" for turning Stevens' detached vocal delivery into a strength.

Kelefa Sanneh of The New York Times stated that Richard X's production allowed Stevens' vocals to "[melt] into the icy beat". Pitchfork placed the song at number 24 on its Top 50 Singles of 2004 list and at number 258 on its The Top 500 Tracks of the 2000s list, with Scott Plagenhoef praising its "sharp production" and "Adam Ant-esque 'whoa's".

== Release and commercial performance ==
"Some Girls" was released as a CD single on 12 July 2004, entering and peaking at number two on the UK Singles Chart on 18 July 2004; noting the song's lyrics about an exasperated singer whose "dreams of number one last forever", The Guardian remarked that the song's chart performance was "as if [it were] following a script".

BBC Radio 1 and 2 added "Some Girls" to their C playlists in late June 2004, and in early July, Radio 1 moved the song to its B playlist. The song quickly picked up airplay and was the most played song for the week of 24 July. "Some Girls" remained on the UK Singles Chart for 13 weeks. The song ended the year as the 40th-best-selling single in the UK and has sold 162,000 copies in the UK as of July 2021. Largely due to the success of "Some Girls", Funky Dory re-entered the UK Albums Chart at number 13 in August 2004, selling 14,561 copies that week. The song was somewhat less successful in Ireland, where it debuted at number 15 on the Irish Singles Chart. It peaked at number 13 in its fifth week, spending a total of 12 weeks on the chart.

== Music video ==
The song's music video was written by Richard Curtis and directed by Paul Weiland. It was filmed at Borough Market in South London. Athletes Colin Jackson, Pat Cash, and Audley Harrison make appearances in the music video.

The video opens with shots of a dank underground sewer. Stevens and a group of women walk through the sewer and put on sunglasses before climbing out of manholes and shafts. A large crowd of women, with Stevens leading them, parades down the streets as men observe the spectacle. The women begin spraying each other with bottles of water, before Stevens returns to the sewer. Throughout the video, sequences of Stevens and a group of backup dancers performing in the sewer are shown.

The video received heavy play from MTV Hits and The Box. Richard X strongly disapproved of the music video. In an interview with NME, he stated, "That video is crap", and he briefly commented on his official website that seeing it "made [him] want to give up [his] life".

== Track listings ==
- UK CD single
1. "Some Girls" – 3:32
2. "Spin That Bottle" – 3:30
3. "Some Girls" (The Sharp Boys Hot Fridge vocal) – 8:38
4. "Some Girls" (CD-ROM video)
- European CD single
1. "Some Girls" – 3:32
2. "Spin That Bottle" (Ben Chapman, Lucie Silvas, Martin Harrington) – 3:30

== Charts ==
=== Weekly charts ===
Weekly chart performance for "Some Girls"
| Chart (2004) | Peak position |
|---|---|
| Belgium (Ultratip Bubbling Under Flanders) | 7 |
| Europe (European Hot 100 Singles) | 10 |
| Ireland (IRMA) | 13 |
| Scottish Singles Sales (Official Charts) | 1 |
| UK Singles (Official Charts) | 2 |

=== Year-end charts ===
Year-end chart performance for "Some Girls"
| Chart (2004) | Position |
|---|---|
| UK Singles (OCC) | 40 |

== Cover versions ==
- In 2006, American dance vocalist Henri covered "Some Girls" as a follow-up to her 2005 debut single, a cover version of Cher's 2002 song "When You Walk Away". Her version reached number six on the US Billboard Hot Dance Club Play chart, where it spent 15 weeks. A club mix, dub, and radio edit by Norty Cotto are included on the CD single release.
- Former Pussycat Dolls collaborator Kaya Jones recorded a version of "Some Girls" and released it as a promotional single on March 12, 2012. It was included on her debut studio album, Kaya, which was released March 30, 2012.
