= Funky Dory (song) =

Single by Rachel Stevens

from the album Funky Dory
- B-side: "I Got the Money"
- Released: December 8, 2003
- Genre: Pop
- Length: 3:05
- Label: Polydor; 19
- Songwriters: David Bowie; Martin Brammer; Gary Clark
- Producers: David Eriksen, Martin Sjølie (album mix); Jeremy Wheatley, Brio Talaferro (single mix)

Rachel Stevens singles chronology
"Sweet Dreams My L.A. Ex" (2003)	"Funky Dory" (2003)	"Some Girls" (2004)

"Funky Dory" is a song by English singer-songwriter Rachel Stevens, released as the second single from Stevens's debut solo album of the same name. It was produced by David Eriksen for Murlyn Music. It was written by Martin Brammer (Kane Gang) and Gary Clark (Danny Wilson). Due to the song being built around a sample of the David Bowie song "Andy Warhol", he is credited as a writer on "Funky Dory". The song peaked at number 26 on the UK Singles Chart.

== Music video ==
The music video for "Funky Dory" was directed by Katie Bell, and filmed at an Old Post Office Basement in north London. The video is moody and lowly lit, which gives it a much darker feel compared to her previous video for "Sweet Dreams My LA Ex".

The video features Stevens putting her make-up on and dancing around the halls of the old building. These scenes are inter-cut with scenes of Stevens in a dark room with a bright light doing a provocative dance on a chair with two backing dancers. Bell uses tricky lighting and mirrors to show different angles and aspects of Stevens throughout the video.

== Chart performance ==
Expectations were high for "Funky Dory" to reach the same amount of success of Stevens' debut solo single "Sweet Dreams My LA Ex". However, partly due to a limited amount of promotion, continuously strong airplay of "Sweet Dreams My LA Ex" and a release in the pre-Christmas rush, it only sold 8,000 copies in its first week, resulting in its low chart position of number twenty-six on the UK Singles Chart, lasting four weeks on the chart. To date, it has sold 20,000 copies and is Stevens' lowest selling single.

== Track listings ==
- CD single
1. "Funky Dory" (single mix) – 3.05
2. "I Got the Money" – 4.03
3. "Funky Dory" (Vertigo vocal mix) – 7.20
4. "Funky Dory" (video)
- Remixes
1. "Funky Dory" (Europa XL vocal mix) – 6:56
2. "Funky Dory" (Sharp Boys Funky Mirrorball vocal mix) – 6:52
3. "Funky Dory" (Vertigo vocal mix) – 7:20
4. "Funky Dory" (Europa XL dub) – 6:59
5. "Funky Dory" (original single mix) – 3:05

== Charts ==
Weekly chart performance for "Funky Dory"
Chart (2003)	Peak position
Ireland (IRMA)	24
Scottish Singles Sales (Official Charts)	24
UK Singles (Official Charts)	26
