= More, More, More =

1976 single by Andrea True

- One of side-A labels of the US single

Single by Andrea True Connection

from the album More, More, More
- Released: February 1976
- Recorded: November 1975
- Studio: Mediasound (New York City); Electric Lady (New York City)
- Genre: Disco
- Length: 3:02 (single version); 6:16 (album version)
- Label: Buddah
- Songwriter: Gregg Diamond
- Producer: Gregg Diamond

Andrea True Connection singles chronology
"More, More, More" (1976)	"Party Line" (1976)

Music video
- "More, More, More" on YouTube

"More, More, More" is a song written by Gregg Diamond and recorded by American artist Andrea True (credited to her recording project Andrea True Connection). It was released in February 1976 by Buddah Records as the first single from her debut album by same name (1976), becoming her signature track and one of the most popular songs of the disco era. The song was both written and produced by Gregg Diamond. In the US, it reached number four on the Billboard Hot 100 and spent three weeks at number three on the Cash Box Top 100 in July of that year. In Canada, it was a number-one hit, and it also reached number five in the UK. In 2025, Billboard magazine included "More, More, More" in their list of "The 100 Best Dance Songs of All Time".

== Background ==
The song was originally recorded in 1975 in Jamaica where True, a porn star, had been appearing in a TV commercial. Unable to return the payment to the United States due to a government ban on asset transfers, she opted to invest the money in a studio recording to advance her career as a singer. True asked Gregg Diamond to visit Jamaica and record it with her and other studio musicians who formed the backbone of the "Connection" project.

Diamond had begun work on compositions that would ultimately evolve into "More, More, More". He decided to have True perform vocals in part due to her career as an adult film actor. Although Diamond is officially credited as the sole author of the track, True has said that she wrote the song's lyrics, while he composed the music. When asked about True's limited vocal ability, Diamond commented: "You can do marvelous things with tape delay."

== Release ==
The original take of the song was first released in Jamaica by Federal Records in 1975, after True and Diamond, having run out of money and unable to pay session musicians for their work, handed in the master tapes to them. Buddah Records subsequently released the song only to discos in the winter of 1975/1976. The popularity of "More, More, More" was immense. Widespread listener interest convinced Buddah to release the single commercially in May, newly remastered by Tom Moulton. The song rose to number four on the Billboard Hot 100 and number twenty three on the soul singles chart. The single was a successful disco hit peaking at number two. In Canada, it topped the RPM Top Singles chart for one week in July 1976. Overseas, the song peaked at number five on the UK Singles Chart. Following the track's popularity in Latin America, True recorded a Spanish language version, "Más, Más, Más".

In 1976, the Andrea True Connection sang "More, More, More", "Party Line", and "Fill Me Up (Heart to Heart)" live on Don Kirshner's Rock Concert. It was also performed on American Bandstand and on Top of the Pops, as well as on the West German TV shows Musikladen and Disco.

== Legacy ==
In October 2000, VH1 ranked "More, More, More" number 45 in their list of "100 Greatest Dance Songs". In June 2020, Slant Magazine ranked it number 79 in their list of "The 100 Best Dance Songs of All Time". In March 2025, Billboard magazine ranked it number 36 in their "The 100 Best Dance Songs of All Time" list, writing, "Like an entire season of The Deuce wrapped into one single, "More, More, More" brought exhibitionist ecstasy to the dancefloor in a defining moment of late-'70s decadence. But the lone hit for porn star-turned-disco diva Andrea True didn't sound smutty — it was seductive, but also strangely innocent in its sighing coos and perky horn rolls. It's not surprising that it would inspire another similarly irresistible but significantly more PG-rated top 10 hit decades later, one that proved that the after-hours perennial worked just as well in the sunshine," (a reference to the 1999 Len song Steal My Sunshine, which prominently samples "More, More, More").

== Track listings and formats ==
- 7" vinyl
1. "More, More, More" (Part 1) – 3:02
2. "More, More, More" (Part 2) – 6:15
- 7" vinyl (Jamaica)
1. "More, More, More"
2. "More, More, More" (Instrumental)

== Credits and personnel ==
Credits and personnel are adapted from the More, More, More album liner notes.

- Andrea True – vocals
- Gregg Diamond – percussion, piano, producer, arrangement
- Godfrey Diamond – drums, engineering
- Steve Love – guitar
- Jim Gregory – bass
- Enrique Moore – saxophone
- James Smart – trumpet
- David Whittman – engineering
- George Raymond – engineering

== Charts ==
=== Weekly charts ===
Chart (1976)	Peak position
Australia (Kent Music Report)	19
Belgium (Ultratop Wallonia)	49
Canada Top Singles (RPM)	1
Canada Adult Contemporary (RPM)	11
Ireland (IRMA)	6
Italy (Musica e dischi)	24
New Zealand (Recorded Music NZ)	25
UK Singles (Official Charts)	5
US Billboard Hot 100	4
US Dance Music/Club Play (Billboard)	1
US R&B Singles (Billboard)	23
US Cash Box Top 100	3
West Germany (GfK)	9

=== Year-end charts ===
Chart (1976)	Position
Australia (Kent Music Report)	99
Canada Top Singles (RPM)	23
US Billboard	17
US Cash Box Top 100	29

== Certifications and sales ==
Region	Certification	Certified units/sales
Canada (Music Canada)	Gold	75,000^{^}
United States (RIAA)	Gold	1,000,000^{^}
^{^} Shipments figures based on certification alone.

== Bananarama version ==
"More, More, More"

Single by Bananarama

from the album Please Yourself
- B-side: "Give It All Up for Love"
- Released: March 8, 1993
- Genre: Dance-pop
- Length: 3:07; 3:21 (Dave Ford single mix)
- Label: London
- Songwriters: Gregg Diamond; Sara Dallin; Keren Woodward; Mike Stock; Pete Waterman
- Producers: Mike Stock; Pete Waterman

Bananarama singles chronology
"Last Thing on My Mind" (1992)	"More, More, More" (1993)	"Every Shade of Blue" (1995)

Music video
- "More, More, More" on YouTube

In 1993, "More, More, More" was covered by the English group Bananarama for their sixth album, Please Yourself (1993). It was produced by Mike Stock and Pete Waterman of Stock Aitken Waterman fame and released in March 1993 by London Records. Their version retained the disco feel of the original and also incorporated elements of ABBA-like production, as was the case with the entire Please Yourself album. Sara Dallin, Keren Woodward, Stock and Waterman added a second verse to their version of the song.

Bananarama's single version (which was remixed from their album version) climbed to number 24 in the UK Singles Chart. It also peaked at number eight in Portugal, number 16 in Ireland and number 65 in Germany. It was their last single to be released by London Records, their label since 1983. The duo would not see another single-release in the UK until "Move in My Direction" in 2005.

=== Critical reception ===
In a retrospective review, Quentin Harrison from Albumism wrote that "Bananarama retrofits it cunningly to early '90s house vibes and just like that, Bananarama have convincingly recast the song as their own." Upon the release, James Masterton" deemed it "a fairly faithful cover" in his UK chart commentary. He added, "With the 70s disco revival well underway it is a timely release and may yet see Sarah and Keren scaling the heights of "Love in the First Degree" again, surely amongst the greatest moments of 1980s pop." Ian McCann from NME felt it "still sounds remarkably like Bananarama, though."

=== Music video ===
A music video was produced to promote the single, directed by Saffie Ashtiany. It features Bananarama performing the song and dancing (in one of their few unchoreographed videos) in a cabaret-style club with several male dancers backing them up.

=== Track listings ===
- UK CD 1 single
1. "More, More, More" (Dave Ford mix) – 3:24
2. "Love in the First Degree" – 3:31
3. "I Want You Back" – 3:47
4. "I Heard a Rumour" – 3:24
- UK CD 2 single
1. "More, More, More" (Dave Ford mix) – 3:24
2. "More, More, More" (12-inch mix) – 5:18
3. "Give It All Up for Love" – 3:57
4. "More, More, More" (I Can't Techno More mix) – 5:01

=== Charts ===
Chart (1993)	Peak position
Europe (Eurochart Hot 100)	49
Germany (GfK)	65
Ireland (IRMA)	16
Portugal (AFP)	8
UK Singles (Official Charts)	24
UK Airplay (Music Week)	42

== Rachel Stevens version ==
"More, More, More"

Single by Rachel Stevens

from the album Funky Dory (re-release)
- B-side: "Shoulda Thought of That"; "Fools" (Princess Diaries 2 version)
- Released: October 4, 2004
- Genre: Pop
- Length: 3:33 (album version); 2:47 (single mix)
- Label: Polydor; 19
- Songwriter: Gregg Diamond
- Producers: Wild Oscar; Jewels & Stone (single mix)

Rachel Stevens singles chronology
"Some Girls" (2004)	"More, More, More" (2004)	"Negotiate with Love" (2005)

English singer Rachel Stevens recorded a cover of "More, More, More" for a reissue of her debut album, Funky Dory (2004). The song was released as the final single from the album. Released on October 4, 2004, her version reached number three in the United Kingdom, charting higher than any other recording of the song there. The recording also reached number five in Ireland.

The song was featured in an advertising campaign for Sky Sports' football coverage for the 2004–2005 season and in adverts for sofa retailer ScS.

=== Track listings ===
- UK CD1
1. "More, More, More" (single mix) – 2:47
2. "Shoulda Thought of That" (Howard New, Lucie Silvas) – 3:14
- UK CD2
1. "More, More, More" (single mix) – 2:47
2. "Fools" (Princess Diaries 2 version) – 3:13
3. "More, More, More" (The Sharp Boys Sky's the Limit Club Remix) – 7:43
4. "More, More, More" (video enhancement)
- Digital single
1. "More, More, More" (single mix) – 2:47
2. "Fools" – 3:13
3. "More, More, More" (The Sharp Boys Sky's the Limit Club Remix) – 7:43
4. "More, More, More" (Almighty Disco Mix) – 6:51
5. "More, More, More" (Almighty Funky Mix) – 7:11
6. "More, More, More" (Almighty Disco Dub) – 6:51

=== Charts ===
==== Weekly charts ====
Chart (2004)	Peak position
Europe (Eurochart Hot 100)	8
Ireland (IRMA)	5
Romania (Romanian Top 100)	80
Scottish Singles Sales (Official Charts)	3
UK Singles (Official Charts)	3

==== Year-end charts ====
Chart (2004)	Position
UK Singles (OCC)	104

== Samplings ==
In 1999, Canadian band Len sampled the instrumental break in "More, More, More" and used it as the backdrop for their top-ten single "Steal My Sunshine".

== In popular culture ==
The Andrea True Connection's version of "More, More, More" has appeared in Whit Stillman's 1998 film The Last Days of Disco. On the show The King of Queens, the 2001 episode "Hi-Def Jam" opened with Doug Heffernan singing a parody version, "Doug, Doug, Doug". The song also appeared in the 2002 film Dahmer during a nightclub montage.

"More, More, More" was also used in the 2005 documentary Inside Deep Throat. In 2006, the song appeared in Click and was used during one of the flashback scenes. The song was featured in American Dad!, Season 3, Episode 2, "Meter Made" in 2006. In the 2022 animated film Minions: The Rise of Gru the song also appeared when Wild Knukles tries to torture Gru In a giant record with a buzzsaw.

The track was used by HBO to promote their series Sex and the City and later in two parodies of that promo for The Chris Rock Show, which featured rapper Biz Markie on the lead vocals and Mad TV for their "Sluts and the City" parody, changing the chorus to "Whore, Whore, Whore".

A version of the song by Dagny was used by Target in a commercial campaign introducing its line of new products in the fall of 2017. Andrea True Connection's version appears in a 2004 commercial for New York & Company and 2019 commercial for Applebee's.

Save-On-Foods, a chain of grocery stores owned by the Jim Pattison Group of British Columbia, Canada, used a chorus sample for their jingle in their television and radio commercials in the late 2000s.
