= Gregg Diamond =

American musician (1949–1999)

- Born: Gregory Oliver Diamond; May 4, 1949; Bryn Mawr, Pennsylvania, U.S.
- Died: March 14, 1999 (aged 49) United States
- Genres: Pop rock, jazz, disco, pop, glam rock
- Occupations: Musician, songwriter, producer
- Instruments: Piano, keyboards

Gregory Oliver Diamond (May 4, 1949 – March 14, 1999) was an American pianist, drummer, songwriter, and producer who was active in the jazz and disco music scenes of the 1970s.

== Career ==
Diamond played drums and percussion for the Creatures, the backing band for Jobriath. He wrote "Hot Butterfly", released in 1978 under one of his group's names, Bionic Boogie. Luther Vandross provided lead vocals. The song was later covered by David Lasley, the Sweet Inspirations, and Chaka Khan.

His other popular songs included "Risky Changes" and "Dance Little Dreamer" (both released by Bionic Boogie in 1977), "Cream (Always Rises to the Top)" (released by Bionic Boogie in 1978), "Starcruisin'" (1978), "Fancy Dancer" (1978), and "Tiger, Tiger (Feel Good For a While)" (1979). "Dance Little Dreamer" reached #1 on the Billboard Hot Dance Club Play chart in 1978. "Cream (Always Rises to the Top)" reached #61 in the UK Singles Chart in January 1979.

Diamond's association with Vandross came from the success of David Bowie's Young Americans album, which included contributions by Vandross and Diamond's brother Godfrey (his sound engineer). Diamond wrote and produced an album for TK Records recording artist George McCrae, scoring a club hit with "Love in Motion".

His biggest commercial success was as writer and producer of the single "More, More, More" recorded by the Andrea True Connection in 1975. Diamond received a posthumous songwriting credit for Len's 1999 hit "Steal My Sunshine", which sampled "More, More, More".

Diamond died of internal bleeding on March 14, 1999, at age 49.

== Discography ==
=== Albums ===
- 1977: Bionic Boogie (Polydor)
- 1978: Gregg Diamond Bionic Boogie – Hot Butterfly (Polydor)
- 1978: Gregg Diamond's Star Cruiser (TK)
- 1979: Gregg Diamond Bionic Boogie – Tiger Tiger (Polydor)
- 1979: Gregg Diamond Hardware (Mercury)

=== Singles ===
| Year | Single | Peak chart positions | | |
| Year | Single | US Dance | US R&B | UK |
|---|---|---|---|---|
| 1978 | "Dance Little Dreamer" | 1 | ― | ― |
| 1978 | "Risky Changes" | 1 | 79 | ― |
| 1978 | "Hot Butterfly" | 8 | ― | 77 |
| 1978 | "Star Cruiser" | 7 | 57 | ― |
| 1979 | "Danger" | 21 | ― | — |
| 1979 | "Cream (Always Rises to the Top)" | ― | ― | 61 |
| 1980 | "Tiger Tiger (Feel Good for a While)" | 33 | ― | ― |
"—" denotes releases that did not chart or were not released in that territory.

== See also ==
- List of artists who reached number one on the US Dance chart
- List of disco artists (F-K)
