= List of works by John Lautner =

List of works by American architect John Lautner.

Name	City	Address	Year	Status
John Lautner House	Los Angeles	2007 Micheltorena Street	1939	
Norman Springer Cottage	Los Angeles	2215 Park Drive, Echo Park	1940	
Bell House	West Hollywood	7714 Woodrow Wilson Drive	1940	
Darrow Office Building	Beverly Hills	9884 S Santa Monica Blvd	1945	
Edgar Mauer House	Los Angeles	932 Rome Drive	1945	
Hancock House	Silver Lake		1945	
Coffee Dan's No. 1	Los Angeles	Wilshire Boulevard	1946	Demolished
Coffee Dan's No. 2	Los Angeles	Vine Street	1946	Demolished
Coffee Dan's No. 3	Los Angeles	Broadway	1946	Demolished
Coffee Dan's No. 4	Los Angeles	Hollywood Boulevard	1946	Demolished
Arthur Eisele Guest House	Los Angeles		1946	
Foster Carling House	Los Angeles	7144 Hockey Trail	1947	
Desert Hot Springs Motel	Desert Hot Springs	67710 San Antonio St	1947	Renamed "Hotel Lautner"
Henry's Restaurant	Glendale		1947	Demolished 1980
Florence Polin House	Hollywood	3542 Multiview Drive	1947	
Jacobsen House	Hollywood	3544 Multiview Drive	1947	
W. F. Gantvoort House	La Cañada Flintridge	3778 Hampstead Road	1947	
Tower Motors Lincoln Mercury Showroom			1947	Demolished
Sheats Apartments ("L'Horizon")	Westwood		1948	
Valley Escrow Offices	Sherman Oaks		1948	Demolished
Jules Salkin House	Los Angeles Echo Park	1430 Avon Terrace	1948	renovated 2014 Barbara Bestor
UPA Studios	Burbank		1949	
Grant Dahlstrom House	Pasadena	780 Laguna Road	1949	
Schaffer House	Glendale	527 Whiting Woods Road	1949	
Googie's Coffee Shop	West Hollywood	8100 Sunset Boulevard	1949	Demolished 1988
Leo Harvey House	Los Angeles	2180 West Live Oak Drive	1950	
Louise Foster House	Sherman Oaks	4235 Las Cruces Drive	1950	
Shusett House	Beverly Hills		1950	Demolished 2010
Lawrence E. Deutsch House	Los Angeles		1950	
George Alexander House	Long Beach	5281 East El Roble Street	1951	
Baxter-Hodiak House	Los Angeles	8650 Pine Tree Place	1951	
Bick House	Brentwood		1951	Demolished 1990
Nouard Gootgeld House	Beverly Hills	1167 Summit Drive	1952	Altered beyond recognition
Howe House	Los Angeles		1952	
Fern Carr House	Los Angeles		1952	Altered beyond recognition
Harry A. Williams House	Los Angeles	3329 Ledgewood Drive	1952	
Ted Bergren House	Los Angeles	7316 Caverna Drive	1953	Burned down 1950s; rebuilt
Henry's Restaurant	Pasadena		1953	Demolished 1979
Tyler House	Studio City	3612 Woodhill Canyon Road	1953	
Howe House	Los Angeles		1953	
Beachwood House	Los Angeles		1954	
Coneco Corporation House	Sherman Oaks		1954	
Harry C. Fischer House	Los Angeles	2487 Canyon Oak Drive	1954	
Baldwin House	Los Angeles		1955	
Reiner-Burchill House ("Silvertop")	Los Angeles	2138 Micheltorena Street	1956	
Speer Contractors Building	Los Angeles		1956	
Kaynar Factory	Pico Rivera		1956	
Willis Harpel House No. 1	Los Angeles	7764 West Torreyson Drive	1956	
Stanley Johnson House	Laguna Beach	789 Pearl Street	1956	
Paul Zahn House	Los Angeles	2880 Hollyridge Drive	1957	
Henry's Restaurant	Pomona		1957	Demolished 1987
Carl and Agnes Pearlman Cabin	Idyllwild	52820 Middle Ridge Drive	1957	
Ernest S. Lautner House ("Round House")	Pensacola	539 El Cerrito Place	1957	
George Hatherell House	Shadow Hills (Los Angeles)	10160 Maude Avenue	1958	
Russ Garcia House ("Rainbow House")	West Hollywood	7436 Mulholland Drive	1958	
Iwerks House	Sherman Oaks		1958	
Leonard J. Malin House ("Chemosphere")	West Hollywood	7776 Torreyson Drive	1958	
Concannon House	Beverly Hills	Angelo View Drive	1960	Demolished 2002
Midtown School	Los Angeles		1960	
Peter Tolstoy House	Rancho Cucamonga	Hillside Road	1961	
Marco Wolff House	West Hollywood	8530 Hedges Place	1961	
Paul Sheats House	Beverly Hills	10104 Angelo View Drive	1962	
Wayne Zimmerman House	Studio City	3848 Berry Drive	1965	
Willis Harpel House No. 2	Anchorage	1900 Stanford Drive	1966	
Marina View Heights Headquarters Building	San Juan Capistrano		1966	
Dan Stevens House	Malibu	23524 Malibu Colony Road	1968	
Arthur Elrod House	Palm Springs	2175 Southridge Drive	1968	
Marco Wolff Mountain Cabin ("Windsong")	Banning	Twin Pines Road	1968	
Douglas Walstrom House	Los Angeles	10500 Selkirk Lane	1969	
Garwood House	Malibu	28815 Grayfox Street	1970	
Gary Familian House	Beverly Hills	1011 Cove Way	1971	
Stephen Bosustow Cabin	Lake Almanor		1972	
Bob Hope House	Palm Springs	Southridge Drive	1973	
William Jordan House	Laguna Beach	1617 Emerald Bay	1973	
Jeronimo Arango House ("Marbrisa")	Acapulco		1973	
Beyer House	Malibu		1975	
Robert Rawlins House	Newport Beach	804 South Bayfront	1978	
Crippled Children's Society	Woodland Hills	6530 Winnetka Avenue	1979	
Gilbert Segel House	Malibu	22426 Pacific Coast Highway	1979	
Allan Turner House	Aspen	51 Heather Lane	1982	
Alden Schwimmer House	Beverly Hills	1435 Bella Drive	1982	
Krause House	Malibu	24444 Malibu Road	1983	
Stanley Beyer House	Malibu	6515 Point Lechuza	1983	
Levy House ("Concrete Castle")	Malibu	32402 Pacific Coast Highway	1990	
Shearing House	Coronado	15 Green Turtle Road	1992	
