= Twilight (1998 film) =

American neo-noir thriller film by Robert Benton

- Theatrical release poster
- Directed by: Robert Benton
- Written by: Robert Benton; Richard Russo
- Produced by: Scott Rudin; Arlene Donovan
- Starring: Paul Newman; Susan Sarandon; Gene Hackman; James Garner; Stockard Channing; Reese Witherspoon; Giancarlo Esposito
- Cinematography: Piotr Sobocinski
- Edited by: Carol Littleton
- Music by: Elmer Bernstein
- Distributed by: Paramount Pictures
- Release date: March 6, 1998
- Running time: 94 minutes
- Country: United States
- Language: English
- Budget: $20 million
- Box office: $15.1 million

Twilight is a 1998 American neo-noir thriller film directed by Robert Benton, written by Benton and Richard Russo, and starring Paul Newman, Susan Sarandon, Gene Hackman, Reese Witherspoon, Stockard Channing and James Garner. The film's original score was composed by Elmer Bernstein.

Twilight was released by Paramount Pictures on March 6, 1998. It received mixed reviews from critics and was a box-office bomb, grossing $15.1 million against its $20 million budget.

== Plot ==
Aging private detective Harry Ross, an ex-cop, is working on a case to return 17-year-old runaway Mel Ames to her parents' home. He tracks down Mel and her sleazy boyfriend, Jeff Willis, at a Mexican resort. During a struggle, Mel accidentally shoots Harry with his pistol, striking him in the upper thigh.

The plot picks up two years later when Ross lives in Southern California in the guest quarters of Mel's wealthy parents, Jack and Catherine Ames. They are former movie stars, now in the twilight of their careers. Jack is dying of cancer, which is out of remission, and he and Ross pass the time playing cards.

One day, Jack asks a favor of Harry: to deliver a package to an address in Los Angeles. It turns out to be the first development in a series of twists and turns in a 20-year-old case involving the disappearance of Catherine's ex-husband.

When Harry arrives at the address, he encounters a man named Ivar, who has just been fatally shot and shoots at Harry. Harry is detained by police, including former colleague Lt. Verna Hollander. At the police station, he runs into another (now retired) old pal and colleague, Raymond Hope.

Verna and Raymond are both sympathetic, as they had heard rumors that Harry suffered damage to his genitals when shot in Mexico. Harry explains that he was only shot in the thigh.

Harry likes Catherine, who flirts with him from time to time. He acts as an agent for Jack and Catherine, who are being blackmailed by Jeff, now out of prison, and his parole officer, Gloria Lamar.

Harry and Catherine have sex for the first (and only) time. Jack angrily realizes this when he has a heart attack that same night, and Catherine responds to his call for help wearing Harry's shirt.

Harry, meanwhile, is forced to acknowledge that his friends have deceived and manipulated him.

Raymond tries to persuade Harry to get away from it all, but Harry has figured out that Raymond was a conspirator in the murder of Catherine's first husband 20 years before. Raymond shoots at Harry, but Harry kills him first. Following this shooting, Harry reconciles with Catherine and Jack. He leaves town with Verna.

== Cast ==
- Paul Newman as Harry Ross
- Susan Sarandon as Catherine Ames
- Gene Hackman as Jack Ames
- Reese Witherspoon as Mel Ames
- James Garner as Raymond Hope
- Stockard Channing as Lieutenant Verna Hollander
- Giancarlo Esposito as Reuben Escobar
- Liev Schreiber as Jeff Willis
- Margo Martindale as Gloria "Mucho" Lamar
- John Spencer as Captain Phil Egan
- M. Emmet Walsh as Lester Ivar
- Clint Howard as EMS Worker

== Production ==
The working title for Twilight was "The Magic Hour." Principal photography began on November 11, 1996. Parts of the movie were filmed at the Los Angeles Police Department's Hollywood Division Station house in Hollywood, California. Many of the police officers seen in the background are actual police officers. The beach sequences was filmed at Mandalay State Beach in Oxnard, California. For Raymond Hope's house, they chose the George Jacobsen House, designed by John Lautner, in the Hollywood Hills. The Ames' house was shot at the Dolores del Río House in Santa Monica, California. The Ames' old family cabin was filmed at the Arch Oboler House, designed by Frank Lloyd Wright, in Malibu, California. The production wrapped in March 1997. Paul Newman gave Susan Sarandon part of his salary after discovering she was being paid less than he and Gene Hackman were making.

== Release ==
=== Box Office ===
Twilight was released in theatres on March 6, 1998, in 1,351 theatres in the U.S., and made $5,866,411 in its opening weekend. While the film featured many notable A-list actors, Twilight's budget of $20 million and gross revenue of $15,055,091 indicates that it was a box-office bomb after being in theatres for eight weeks.

=== Home media ===
The DVD was released on October 7, 1998, in Widescreen. Features included English closed-captioning, Spanish subtitles, and the theatrical trailer, which included scenes not in the final edit of the film.

== Reception ==
=== Critical response ===
The film holds a 61% "Fresh" rating on review aggregator Rotten Tomatoes, based on 62 reviews with an average rating of 6.1/10. The consensus states: "It suffers from a frustratingly deliberate pace, but with nuanced performances from Paul Newman, Gene Hackman, Susan Sarandon, and Reese Witherspoon to fall back on, Twilight can't help but be compelling." Audiences polled by CinemaScore gave the film an average grade of "C+" on an A+ to F scale.

Roger Ebert wrote,

"The reason to see the film is to observe how relaxed and serene Paul Newman is before the camera. How, at 73, he has absorbed everything he needs to know about how to be a movie actor so that at every moment he is at home in his skin and the skin of his character. It's sad to see all that assurance used in the service of a plot so worn and mechanical."

Entertainment Weekly critic Owen Gleiberman gave the film a C+ grade. He wrote it was meant to be "...about the relationship between a semiretired gumshoe (Paul Newman) and two veteran movie stars (Gene Hackman and Susan Sarandon)..." but was more "...about the trio of aging stars who play them."

Barbara Shulgasser of the SFGate said that it had a "dazzlingly smart script by Benton and co-writer Richard Russo." She wrote further: "Twilight is as close to a perfect film as I've seen in a long while."

Heather Clisby of Movie Magazine International described it as "one of those films where everybody involved seems to have actually cared, thus we have a superb product with memorable characters brought to life by some of the finest actors of our time."

Janet Maslin of The New York Times wrote in her review "Twilight, a class act in a classic genre, finds Paul Newman playing detective amid some uncommonly soigne Los Angeles settings. The film's sleek, unusual locations, including an unfinished Frank Lloyd Wright project in the hills above Malibu, have been artfully chosen, but of course it's the guy in the gumshoes who is the real monument here."

Todd McCarthy of Variety wrote in his review "Very much befitting its title, Twilight is an autumnal murder mystery awash in rueful intimations of mortality."
