= Hollywood 7 =

- Also known as: S Club 7 in Hollywood
- Directed by: Joe Nathan and Danny Kaplan.
- Starring: S Club 7 Barry Williams
- Opening theme: "You"
- Countries of origin: United Kingdom; United States
- Original language: English
- No. of series: 1
- No. of episodes: 13

Production
- Executive producer: Simon Fuller.
- Running time: 25 mins (approx)
- Production company: 19 Entertainment

Original release
- Network: CBBC (on BBC One)
- Release: 27 September – 20 December 2001

Related
- Miami 7 (1999); L.A. 7 (2000); Viva S Club (2002)

Hollywood 7 (known as S Club 7 in Hollywood in the United States) is the third series in the BBC television series starring British pop group S Club 7 and the second television series shot in California. The programme was shown every week on CBBC from 27 September 2001 and 20 December 2001 and stars all seven members of the band as fictionalized versions of themselves. The series also features former Brady Bunch actor Barry Williams as Dean Strickland, S Club 7's manager. The writers were Kim Fuller, Paul Alexander, Georgia Pritchett, Simon Braithwaite and Paul Dornan.

Following the pattern of the previous series of the show, the show was renamed S Club 7 in Hollywood for American audiences. It aired on the renamed ABC Family network from 29 September 2001 to 26 January 2002.

== Plot ==
In the first episode of the series, the group decide to give themselves 24 hours to get themselves a new manager. The group come across Dean Strickland and he adopts the seven as their new manager. Shortly into the series, the group find themselves without a record deal and so they have to search for a deal, or else they will disband. Luckily, the group find a record company willing to sign them. Unlike Miami 7 and L.A. 7, which portrays S Club 7 as struggling just to make known of their existence, Hollywood 7 portrays the group experiencing what they have been hoping for since they came to the States: having an agent, getting a record deal, becoming publicized, etc. They film their first music video, become a support act for a Latin heart-throb, and even have their first concert. At the end of the series, the group have to move back to England to record their album and start internationally promoting S Club 7, just as they are starting to become fully assimilated into American life.

The series also saw, shadowing real life, something between Hannah and Paul develop. In the fifth episode of the series, they share a kiss which sends shock waves throughout the band.

== Cast ==
=== Main ===
- Tina Barrett as herself
- Paul Cattermole as himself
- Jon Lee as himself
- Bradley McIntosh as himself
- Jo O'Meara as herself
- Hannah Spearritt as herself
- Rachel Stevens as herself
- Barry Williams as Dean Strickland

=== Recurring ===
- James R. Black as Gordon
- Shalim Ortiz as Miguel Delgado

== Episodes ==
Title	Original airdate	U.S. airdate	S Club sing	#
"The Last Chance"	27 September 2001	29 September 2001	"Show Me Your Colours"	27
Still in Hollywood, S Club 7 decide to give themselves 24 hours to find a manager, or else they will return to England and split up. Whilst searching, Jo and Bradley pay for the help of Mystic Pete who tells them they will find success at the place where the big silver birds go to die. Meanwhile, an unsuccessful manager, Dean Strickland (played by Barry Williams) is given 24 hours to find talent or else he will give up his career. He too enlists the help of Mystic Pete who tells them he will find success where the big silver birds go to die. Luckily, Tina saves Dean from a thief stealing his watch and so the gang end up coming into contact with him.
"Dosh"	4 October 2001	6 October 2001	"It's Alright"	28
Feeling sad, the group are cheered up when their first paycheck arrives. Apart from Jo, who decides to save hers, the group go on a spending spree. Hannah buys some fish, Bradley tries to impress a girl, Paul buys some new water equipment, Jon gets a year pass for Universal Studios, Tina pays for a $600 dance class and Rachel buys some new clothes. However, when they compare paychecks, the group realise they are being paid different amounts. The group decide to confront Dean about it and they find out that the reason is that they are paid according to how popular they are.
"Public Relations"	11 October 2001	13 October 2001	"You"	29
With publicity running dry, Dean hires an expert who sets up some attention-grabbing publicity stunts, many of which consist of contrived stories. The plan goes horribly wrong with Rachel and Hannah getting a real shock on a Jerry Springer type show, Tina having to deal with some painful lies about plastic surgery and Jon being matched up with a fake girlfriend.
"Doing the Deal"	18 October 2001	20 October 2001	"Don't Stop Movin'"	30
Dean tells the band if they are unable to get a record deal, they would have to part ways. So Dean gets busy and sends out demos to various record companies. The seven are then told to wait in a house put up by Dean, and wait for a telephone call. After a long time, Dean phones and says one record company wants to pick them up, but require the group to perform first. After the performance, the record company decide to pick the group up. Meanwhile, Hannah and Jo fall out over a boy Hannah wants to break up with, due to the fact that Jo considers her predictable.
"The Kiss"	25 October 2001	27 October 2001	"Show Me Your Colours"	31
Reflecting real life events, Hannah and Paul kiss for the first time. Confused about their feelings for each other, they both decide to deny it and keep it a secret from the rest of the group. Meanwhile, S Club 7 gets an extra member in shape of a new dog.
"The Fan"	1 November 2001	3 November 2001	"Summertime Feeling"	32
On the set of their first music video, the group have a director who wants to take the video in many directions. He cannot make his mind up, and the group adopt some strange costumes such as Yin and yang theme, cowboys and cowgirls and devils and angels. In the end, the group decide to make their own music video featuring new footage at the beach, and old footage from the video shoot. Meanwhile, a fan becomes obsessed with Bradley, then later Rachel.
"The Cousin"	8 November 2001	10 November 2001	"Dance, Dance, Dance"	33
Hannah's cousin Ben comes to visit but he turns out to only want to be a part of their success. He asks for money and even ropes the gang into playing at a Mafia wedding. Meanwhile, Jon, Paul and Bradley get the job of training Dean to run in the L.A. marathon.
"The Stylist"	15 November 2001	17 November 2001	"Have You Ever"	34
Dean decides that S Club 7 need a complete makeover and so sets about creating new identities for the band. Unfortunately, the group do not take too kindly to their new looks and so decide to stage a rebellion.
"Alone Again"	22 November 2001	24 November 2001	"Stronger" "Sunshine" "It's Alright"	35
The manager, Dean, is sacked by their record company for being too old and the future of S Club 7 looks bleak. The group have to risk everything in order to get him back or else it could, once again, mean the end for S Club. Meanwhile, Rachel is traumatised after discovering she has a grey hair; she becomes convinced that she is ageing prematurely.
"Supporting Parts"	29 November 2001	1 December 2001	"You" "S Club Party" "Friday Night"	36
S Club 7 are asked to support a massive Latino superstar, Miguel Delgado, who the four girls are all crazy for. However, they accidentally knock him out just before going on stage and so have to perform whilst they try to wake him up at the same time.
"The Vanishing"	6 December 2001	8 December 2001	"Don't Stop Movin'"	37
After ruining Miguel Delgado's concert and making him lose his memory, the group decide to hang low. So, they decide to hide out in a dirty motel. Finding themselves broke, they send Hannah and Jon back to the apartment in disguise – Hannah dressed as a hairy Irishman and Jon as a girl. When they are out trying to get money from the apartment, Miguel – thinking Jon is a girl – asks him out on a date.
"The Concert"	13 December 2001	15 December 2001	"Never Had a Dream Come True" "Bring the House Down" "Reach"	38
The group land a concert where they have to perform in front of thousands of fans. However, Rachel gets extremely nervous and has stage fright and Tina fears she may lose her voice on stage. However, when it comes to their performance they manage to get over their nerves and perform for the fans.
"The Return"	20 December 2001	22 December 2001	"Have You Ever"	39
After finally breaking America, S Club 7 are being sent off to do some international promotion. They are overjoyed when they hear that they get to finally go home to England after a very successful few months in the USA. As they pack, they reminisce on everything that has happened since their plane trip to Miami all the way until their first concert.

== Video releases ==
Hollywood 7 was released on PAL video on 29 April 2002. Unlike previous releases, it is only available in a "Complete Boxset" containing all thirteen episodes. The series was never released in America on NTSC VHS, nor was it ever released on DVD in United States or the United Kingdom.
