= Have You Ever =

2001 single by S Club 7

Single by S Club 7

from the album Sunshine
- B-side: "Dangerous"
- Released: 19 November 2001
- Length: 3:20
- Label: Polydor; 19
- Songwriters: Cathy Dennis; Andrew Frampton; Chris Braide
- Producer: Stephen Lipson

S Club 7 singles chronology
"Don't Stop Movin'" (2001)	"Have You Ever" (2001)	"You" (2002)

Music video
- "Have You Ever" on YouTube

"Have You Ever" is a song by British pop group S Club 7, released as the second single from the group's third album Sunshine on 19 November 2001. Following the success of the group's 2000 Children in Need track, "Never Had a Dream Come True", the BBC asked S Club 7 to perform the 2001 track for the charity as well.

Co-written by Cathy Dennis, Andrew Frampton, and Chris Braide, the single entered the UK Singles Chart at number one on 25 November 2001, becoming the group's fourth and final UK number one. The Children in Need version of "Have You Ever" is listed in the Guinness Book of World Records as having the highest number of people's voices recorded in a single song, as recordings from children in schools across the UK were used in the chorus. The song has sold 380,000 copies in the UK according to the Official UK Charts Company. The photo for the cover of the single was shot in a major architectural landmark of the Los Angeles area: the Sheats Goldstein Residence near Beverly Hills.

== Music video ==
The music video was set inside a large house (which is actually the famous Ennis House in Hollywood Hills), showing each member briefly as they indulge in everyday activities, while O'Meara is the main focus of the video. O'Meara revealed that to film the shot of her crying, they used droplets of water on her cheek, and sped the track up to film it, so when it was mastered it would give the illusion of a real tear. Another interesting note about the video is that it was the last video Paul Cattermole shot for the group as "You", the following single, was intended to be the next release and thus had been recorded previously. The video was shot at the last minute, the day before the band returned to the UK after filming Hollywood 7 as the song was chosen for the Children in Need song.

== Children in Need performance ==
During the performance on Children in Need on 16 November 2001, the group were joined by S Club Juniors which was their first television appearance.

Six live school choirs sang along. These were:

- Hamble School singing from the concert at Castle Field in Portsmouth
- Longcroft School singing from the concert at the Dome Leisure Centre in Doncaster
- Gwauncelyn Junior School singing from the concert in Cardiff
- Auchenback Primary School singing from the concert in Glasgow
- The King John School singing from the concert at the De Montfort Hall in Leicester
- Forge Integrated Primary School singing from the concert in Belfast the link up on the night never went to their performance.

They were joined by 3610 other schools who sent in audio tapes to be included on the chorus.

== Track listings ==
- UK CD single
1. "Have You Ever" – 3:20
2. "Have You Ever" (BBC Children in Need version) – 3:20
3. "Dangerous" – 3:52
4. "Have You Ever" (CD-ROM video)
- UK cassette single
1. "Have You Ever" – 3:20
2. "Have You Ever" (BBC Children in Need version) – 3:20
- European CD single
1. "Have You Ever" – 3:20
2. "Never Had a Dream Come True" – 4:00
- Australian CD single
1. "Have You Ever" – 3:20
2. "Never Had a Dream Come True" – 4:00
3. "Dangerous" – 3:52
4. "Have You Ever" (CD-ROM video)
- Digital single
1. "Have You Ever" – 3:21
2. "Dangerous" – 3:54

== Credits and personnel ==
Credits are lifted from the Sunshine album booklet.

Studios

- Vocals recorded at Larrabee Studios (Los Angeles)
- Produced and mixed at The Aquarium (London, England)
- Mastered at Transfermation (London, England)

Personnel

- Cathy Dennis – writing, arrangement
- Andrew Frampton – writing, programming
- Chris Braide – writing
- John Themis – guitars
- Greg Wells – piano, organ
- Dave Stewart – keyboards
- Stephen Lipson – programming, production
- Heff Moraes – mixing, engineering
- Richard Dowling – mastering

== Charts ==
=== Weekly charts ===
Chart (2001)	Peak position
Australia (ARIA)	49
Austria (Ö3 Austria Top 40)	49
Belgium (Ultratip Bubbling Under Wallonia)	8
Europe (Eurochart Hot 100)	11
Germany (GfK)	37
Ireland (IRMA)	4
New Zealand (Recorded Music NZ)	20
Romania (Romanian Top 100)	39
Scottish Singles Sales (Official Charts)	1
Sweden (Sverigetopplistan)	21
Switzerland (Schweizer Hitparade)	40
UK Singles (Official Charts)	1
UK Airplay (Music Week)	4

=== Year-end charts ===
Chart (2001)	Position
Ireland (IRMA)	45
UK Singles (OCC)	21

== Certifications ==
Region	Certification	Certified units/sales
United Kingdom (BPI)	Gold	400,000^{‡}
^{‡} Sales+streaming figures based on certification alone.

== Release history ==
Region	Date	Format(s)	Label(s)	Ref.
United Kingdom	19 November 2001	CD; cassette	Polydor; 19	
Australia	19 November 2001	CD	Polydor; 19	
