= You (S Club 7 song) =

2002 single by S Club 7

Single by S Club 7

from the album Sunshine
- B-side: "The Long and Winding Road"
- Released: 11 February 2002
- Length: 3:26 (album version); 3:31 (single version)
- Label: Polydor; 19
- Songwriters: Eliot Kennedy; Tim Lever; Mike Percy; Tim Woodcock
- Producer: Steelworks

S Club 7 singles chronology
"Have You Ever" (2001)	"You" (2002)	"Alive" (2002)

Music video
- "You" on YouTube

"You" is a song by British pop group S Club 7, released on 11 February 2002 as the final single from their third studio album, Sunshine (2001). The track served as the theme song to their third series, Hollywood 7, in 2001, and was the group's last single to feature band member Paul Cattermole. The song reached No. 2 on the UK Singles Chart, ranking at No. 70 on the year-end edition. The single features a cover of the Beatles's "The Long and Winding Road".

The song's music video is set in the 1950s and is described in the Best CD booklet as a "candy floss-bright, tongue-in-cheek 50s pastiche". In a 2019 interview, Cattermole stated that the song was not the group's choice as a single, as they felt it was a step backwards from the more mature and contemporary sound they had established with the rest of the album but were overruled by management.

== Music video ==
The first part of the video stars Rachel Stevens as a wife who cooks food for her husband portrayed by Paul Cattermole as he arrives home. But a mistress played by Jo O'Meara appears out of nowhere, distracts Cattermole and they start dancing. Then they enter another room through a curtain, revealing the other band members. The part ends with Hannah Spearritt dancing. The second part shows Stevens mowing the lawn. Jon Lee joins her, but soon goes to O'Meara, who is having a barbecue. The smoke from the grill shows the other six members dancing under umbrellas. Stevens looks while using a hose, which turns off then sprays her in the face. The third part takes place in the garage. Bradley McIntosh is repairing the car. Stevens looks at him, McIntosh does likewise. Then O'Meara appears in the car dancing with McIntosh. The others come in. Stevens is sad until the others sing to her. They all sing together and they drive off.

The music video for "You" was filmed after "Don't Stop Movin'" and was intended as the follow-up single before the group were asked to record the Children in Need single ("Have You Ever") for that year. The music video features vocals from Lee and McIntosh, in addition to Stevens and O’Meara, the latter two who lead the vocals in the album release. This single version with Lee and McIntosh was later also featured in the Best: Greatest Hits of S Club 7 compilation album.

== Track listings ==
- UK CD1 and Australian CD single
1. "You" (single version) – 3:31
2. "The Long and Winding Road" – 3:44
3. "Bring the House Down" (Almighty mix) – 7:21
4. "You" (CD-ROM video) – 3:31
- UK CD2
1. "You" (single version) – 3:31
2. "Stronger" (Solar8 mix) – 5:48
3. "You" (The Bold and the Beautiful Swishy Disco mix) – 6:09
- UK cassette single
1. "You" (single version) – 3:31
2. "You" (karaoke version) – 3:31
- European CD single
1. "You" (single version) – 3:31
2. "You" (The Bold and the Beautiful Swishy Disco mix) – 6:09
- Digital single
1. "You" (single version) – 3:32
2. "The Long & Winding Road" – 3:44
3. "You" (Almighty mix) – 7:21
4. "You" (The Bold and The Beautiful Swishy Disco mix) – 6:09
5. "You" (7th District Summer Jam) – 7:30
6. "You" (Karaoke version) – 3:32

== Credits and personnel ==
Credits are lifted from the Sunshine album booklet.

Studios

- Produced at Steelworks Studios (Sheffield, England)
- Mastered at Transfermation (London, England)

Personnel

- Eliot Kennedy – writing, keyboards
- Tim Lever – writing, guitars
- Mike Percy – writing, keyboards
- Tim Woodcock – writing, guitars
- Henrik Linnemann – flute
- Nik Coombs – flugelhorn
- Matthew Burke – trumpet
- Owen Bourne – trombone
- Steelworks – production
- Stephen Lipson – additional production
- Heff Moraes – mixing
- Ben Coombs – engineering
- David O'Hagan – assistant engineering
- Richard Dowling – mastering

== Charts ==
=== Weekly charts ===
Weekly chart performance for "You"
Chart (2002)	Peak position
Australia (ARIA)	71
Europe (Eurochart Hot 100)	23
Ireland (IRMA)	6
Scotland Singles (OCC)	3
UK Singles (OCC)	2
UK Airplay (Music Week)	23

=== Year-end charts ===
Year-end chart performance for "You"
Chart (2002)	Position
Ireland (IRMA)	73
UK Singles (OCC)	70

== Release history ==
Release history and formats for "You"
Region	Date	Format(s)	Label(s)	Ref.
United Kingdom	11 February 2002	CD; cassette	Polydor; 19	
Australia	29 April 2002	CD	Polydor; 19	
