= Shusett House =

Former historic house in Beverly Hills, California

Coordinates: 34.0886°N 118.3970°W

Shusett House was a house in Beverly Hills, California, built in 1951 by the American architect John Lautner (1911—1994). In 2010, the house was threatened with demolition by its owner. By 2012 it was demolished.
