= Sheats Apartments =

Historic building in Los Angeles, California, United States

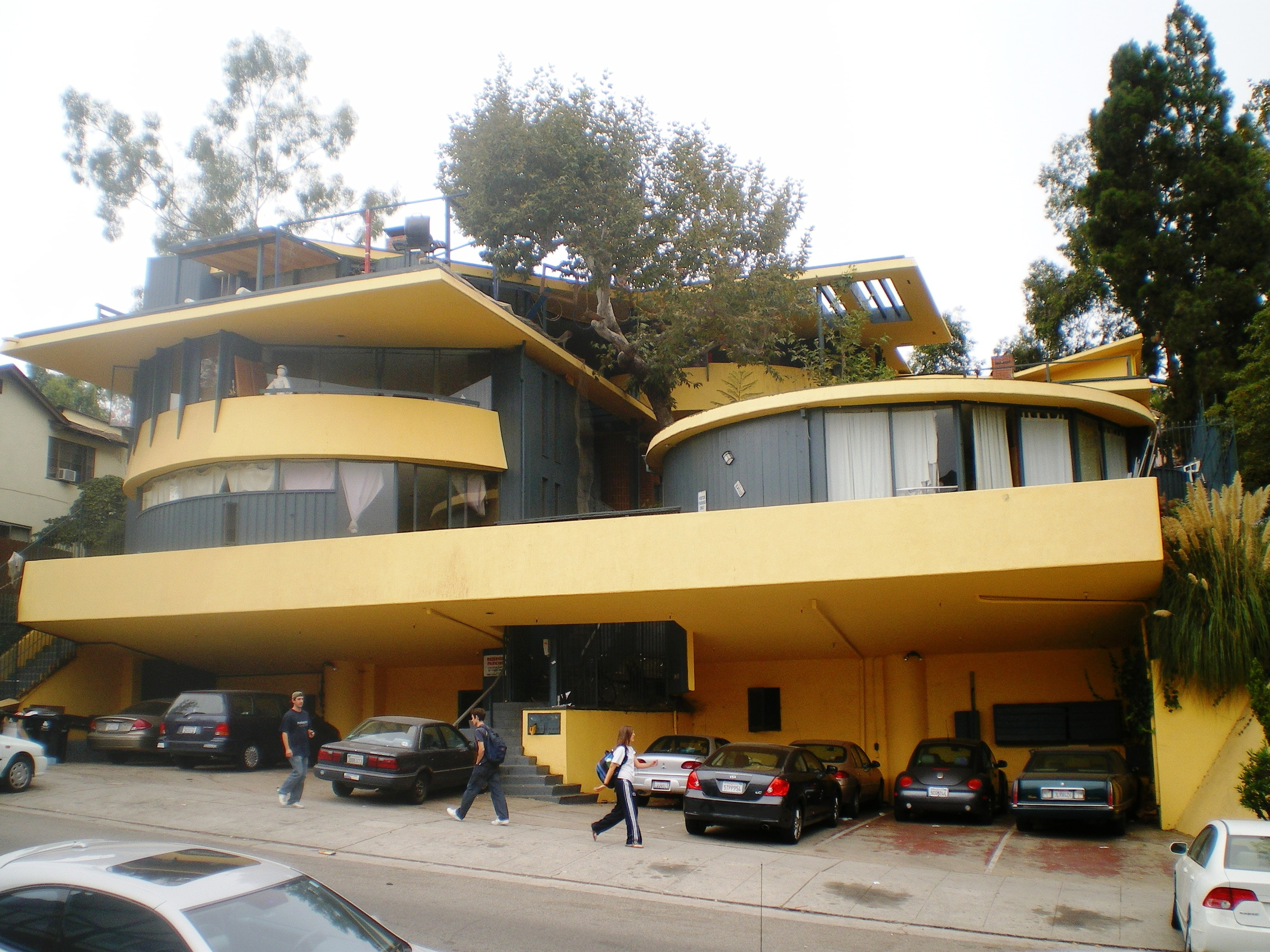

- Location within Los Angeles
- 34°04′04″N 118°26′58″W
- Location: 10919 Strathmore Drive, Westwood, Los Angeles, California

History
- Built: 1949

Site notes
- Architect: John Lautner
- Architectural style: Futurist
- Governing body: private

Los Angeles Historic-Cultural Monument
- Designated: June 21, 1988
- Reference no.: 367

The Sheats Apartments, also known as L'Horizon and sometimes mistakenly as the Sheets Apartments, is a historic eight-unit, multi-family building located at 10919 Strathmore Drive, in the Westwood neighborhood of Los Angeles, California. It is colloquially referred to as The Treehouse by UCLA students.

== History ==
Designed in 1948 in the futuristic style by Los Angeles architect John Lautner, it was completed in 1949 for Neo-Fauvist artist Helen Taylor Sheats, who assisted in the design, and her second husband, dean of University of California Extension Paul Henry Sheats, who was also a professor at UCLA.

Because of its proximity to University of California, Los Angeles (UCLA), it was intended for and has been used primarily for student occupancy. In their book An Architectural Guidebook to Los Angeles, David Gebhard and Robert Winter praised its functionality by noting, "each apartment [is] completely separated from the others . . . with its own terraces, decks, and outdoor garden space." However, its condition in recent years has deteriorated, with visiting professor, Westwood resident, and former presidential candidate Michael Dukakis calling it "a dump" in 2004, and pressured the agency responsible to issue parking tickets to sidewalk-blocking offenders.

On June 21, 1988, the City of Los Angeles designated the building as a Los Angeles Historic-Cultural Monument.

== Helen Taylor Sheats ==
A fourth-generation St. Charles, Illinois resident, Helen Taylor Sheats was born Helen Caroline Johnson on April 21, 1910, in Chicago. In 1930, she graduated from the University of Wisconsin, then spent two years as a student at the Art Institute of Chicago. In 1932, she married Vern Taylor, an agronomist and a fellow student at the University of Wisconsin, and moved back to Madison. Taylor died from rheumatic fever-induced heart disease. She returned to the University of Wisconsin to earn a teaching credential. She then taught art in grammar schools and taught jewelry making in adult education classes. While obtaining her teaching credential at the University of Wisconsin, she met Paul Henry Sheats. In 1942 Helen Caroline Johnson Taylor married Paul Henry Sheats. They moved to New York City, where Paul was the education director of Town Hall of the Air, and later to Los Angeles, where Paul joined the University of California at Los Angeles Education Department faculty. Helen Caroline Johnson Taylor Sheats and Paul Henry Sheats had four children. Helen Caroline Johnson Taylor Sheats and Paul Henry Sheats later divorced. She studied painting under Arnold Schifren in Los Angeles.

== See also ==
- Sheats-Goldstein House
