= Sheats–Goldstein Residence =

House in Beverly Crest, Los Angeles, California, US

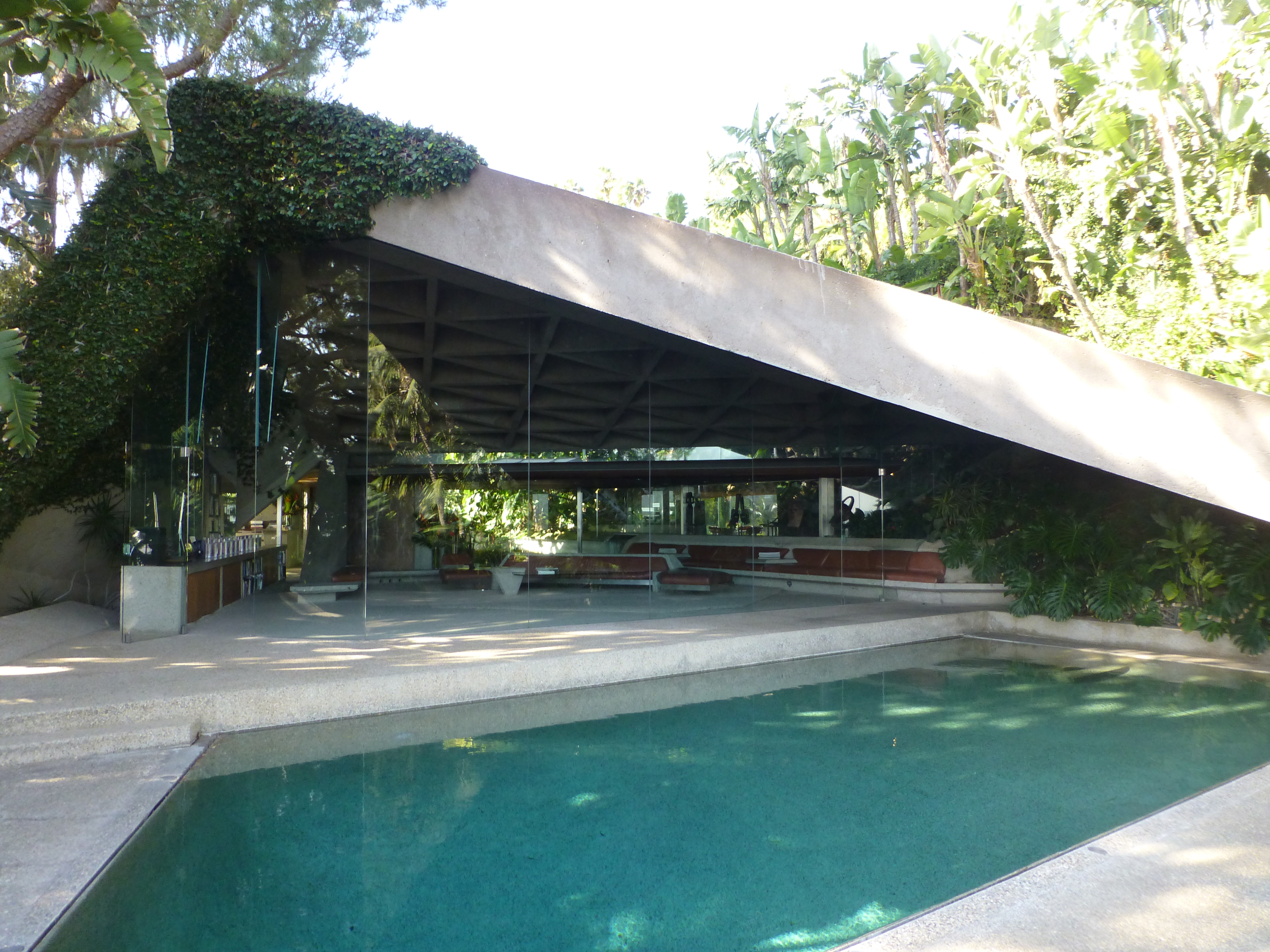

General information
- Type: House
- Architectural style: Mid-century modern; Organic architecture
- Location: Angelo View Drive, Los Angeles, California
- Coordinates: 34.0936°N 118.435°W
- Construction started: 1963

Technical details
- Structural system: Poured-in-place concrete
- Floor area: 4,500 sq ft (420 m^{2})

Design and construction
- Architect: John Lautner

The Sheats–Goldstein Residence is a house designed by American architect John Lautner, in the Beverly Crest neighborhood of Los Angeles, California. Designed and built between 1961 and 1963, Lautner used the sandstone ledge upon which the house was built as design inspiration for a cave-like dwelling, and used the hillside site to take advantage of the dramatic views of Benedict Canyon and Beverly Hills. The house exemplifies the tenets of both Mid-Century Modern design and the American Organic Architecture ethos, deriving its form as an extension of its environment and of the individuals for whom it was built. The design of the house and the completed structure—like all of Lautner's work—have been commended as being strongly influenced and defined by addressing the challenges and constraints of the site.

== History ==
The house was originally built as a private residence for Helen Taylor Sheats (1910–1999), and Paul Henry Sheats (1907–1984) and their three children. Helen, an architectural designer and Neo-Fauvist painter, and Paul, Dean of University Extension and Professor in the UCLA Graduate School of Education, had previously commissioned Lautner for their 1948–1949 Sheats Apartments project located in Westwood, a neighborhood adjacent to the University of California, Los Angeles.

The Sheats–Goldstein Residence is one of John Lautner's most well-known works. In addition to the house, Lautner designed the interiors, windows, lighting, rugs, furniture, and operable features as integrated components of the home. Lautner’s design of both the house and the forms within resulted in a cohesive design relationship: the materials and aesthetics of the forms complement and tie the rooms together as individual but related design elements of the house as a whole. The range of Lautner's design work is visible throughout the project.

Originally constructed with wood, steel, and poured-in-place concrete, the house has five bedrooms, four bathrooms, and one half-bathroom (sink and toilet). Lautner designed the living room completely open to the terrace, and protected by a forced-air curtain. Lautner's unique design took advantage of Southern California's temperate Mediterranean climate and the Santa Monica Mountains' warm canyon winds to create a natural, zesty environment with a seamless transition between the home's interior and exterior.

One of the home's most distinct features is the living room's coffered ceiling, the surface of which has over 750 cast drinking glass skylights. The home is cooled with cross-ventilation, while the floors and pool are warmed with copper-pipe radiant heating. Exterior pathways lead to guest bedrooms and the primary bedroom, and exterior features include a tennis court and nightclub. Windows in the primary bedroom and the studio were designed with views of the pool so Helen Sheats could watch her children swim while she worked in her art studio.

In 1972, businessman James Goldstein purchased the residence from its third owners, and began a partnership with Lautner to renovate, upgrade, and improve the house. For the following two decades, Goldstein and Lautner worked together "perfecting" the house until Lautner's death in 1994. One of Goldstein's additions to the home is Above Horizon, an art installation designed by light artist James Turrell.

Located on a steep slope below the residence, Above Horizon was built with the same construction materials as the home. James Goldstein originally envisioned the installation as a collaboration between John Lautner and James Turrell, but Lautner died before being able to work extensively on the project. Completed in 2004, the room features two folding carbon-fiber portals and a built-in concrete lounge for viewing thousands of hidden LEDs lighting the room every evening.

In 2016, James Goldstein entrusted the home and estate to the Los Angeles County Museum of Art (LACMA) as a promised gift to the institution. The endowment includes Goldstein's extensive art collection, Lautner's architectural models, and a 1961 Rolls-Royce Silver Cloud parked on the property. The collection is the first of its kind for LACMA and the endowment preserves the home's legacy, Lautner's work as an urban achievement, and its significance in Los Angeles architectural history.

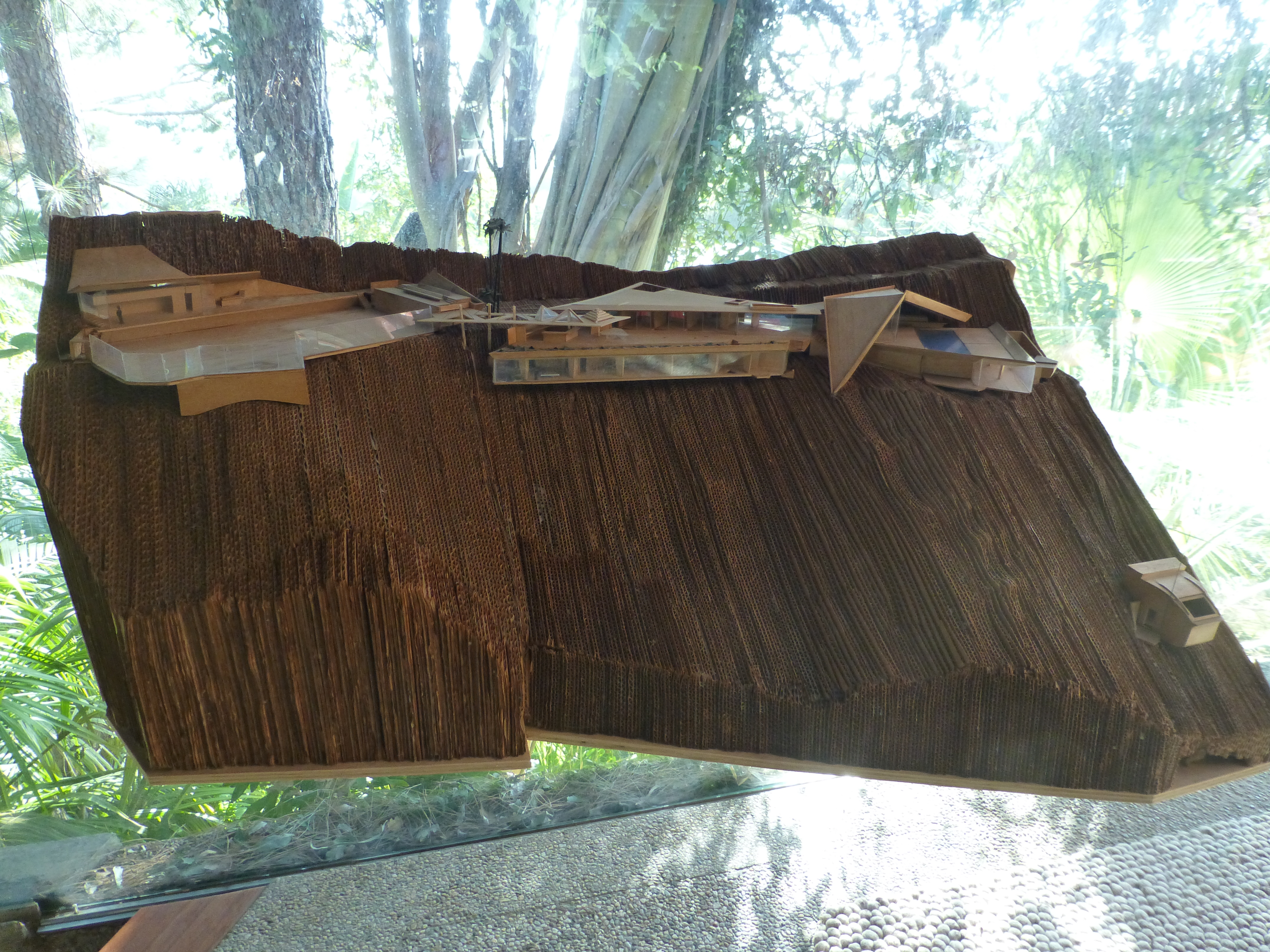
Scale site model

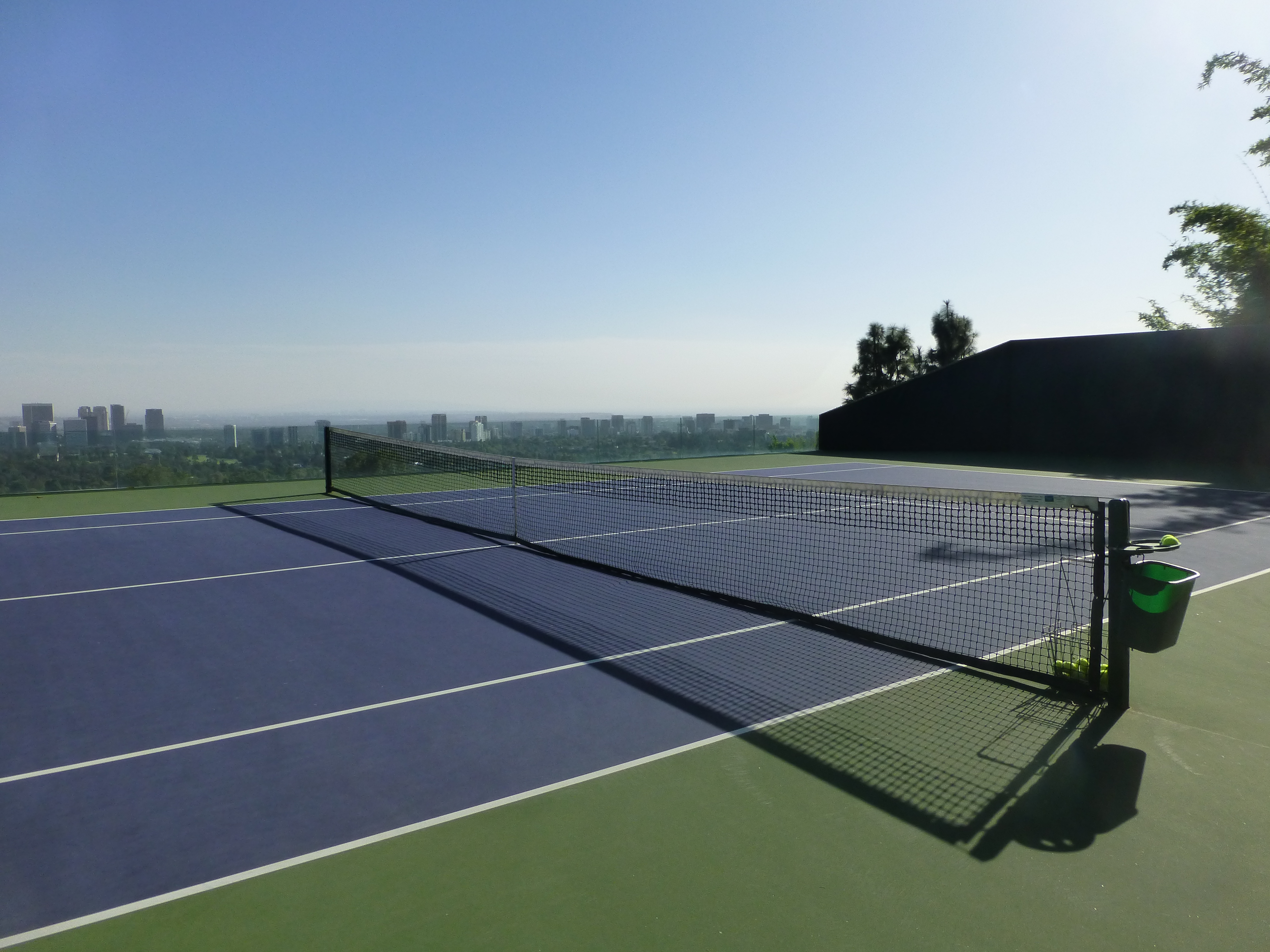
Tennis court

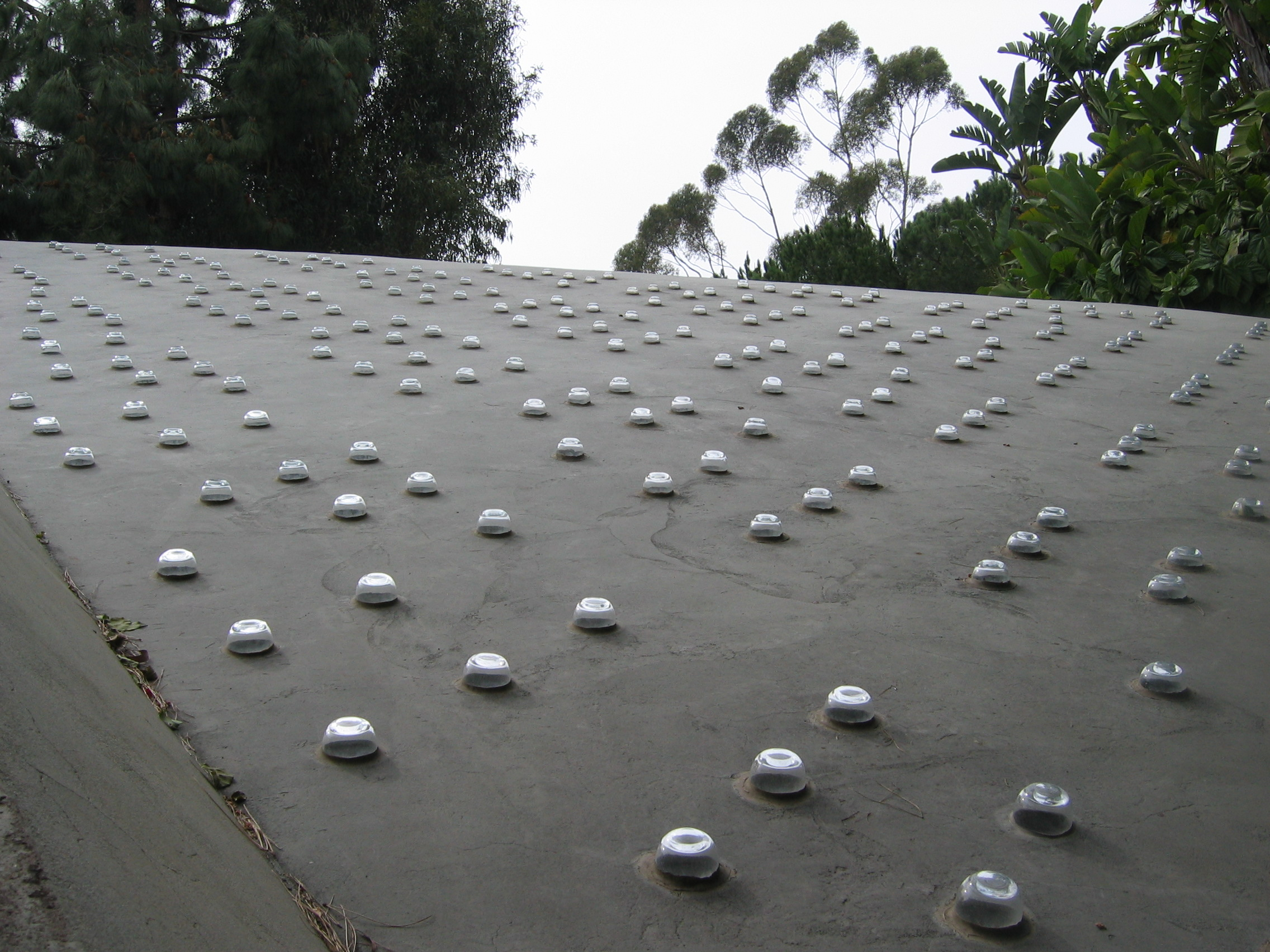
Concrete roof with cast-drinking glass skylights, exterior view

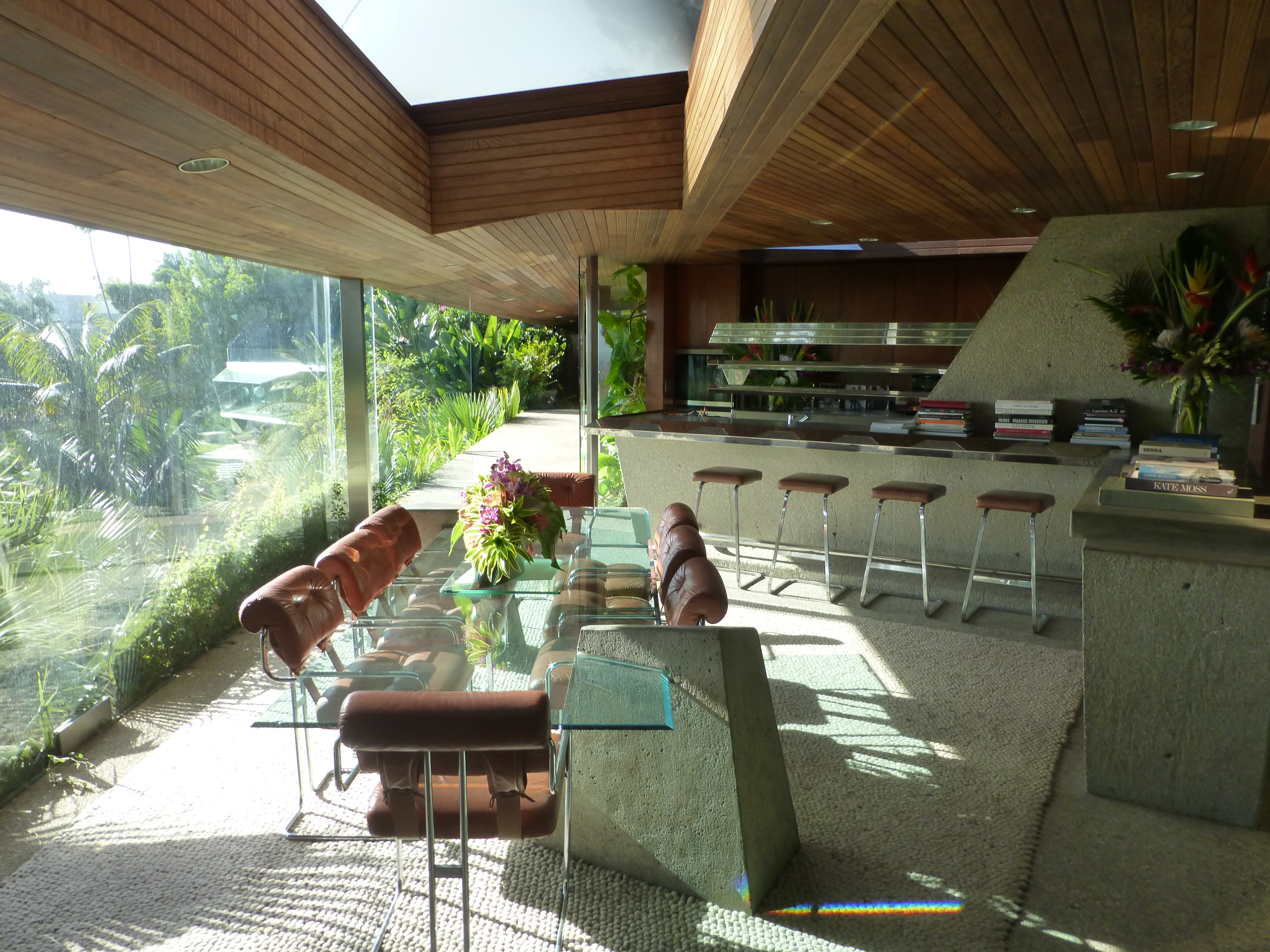
Kitchen bar

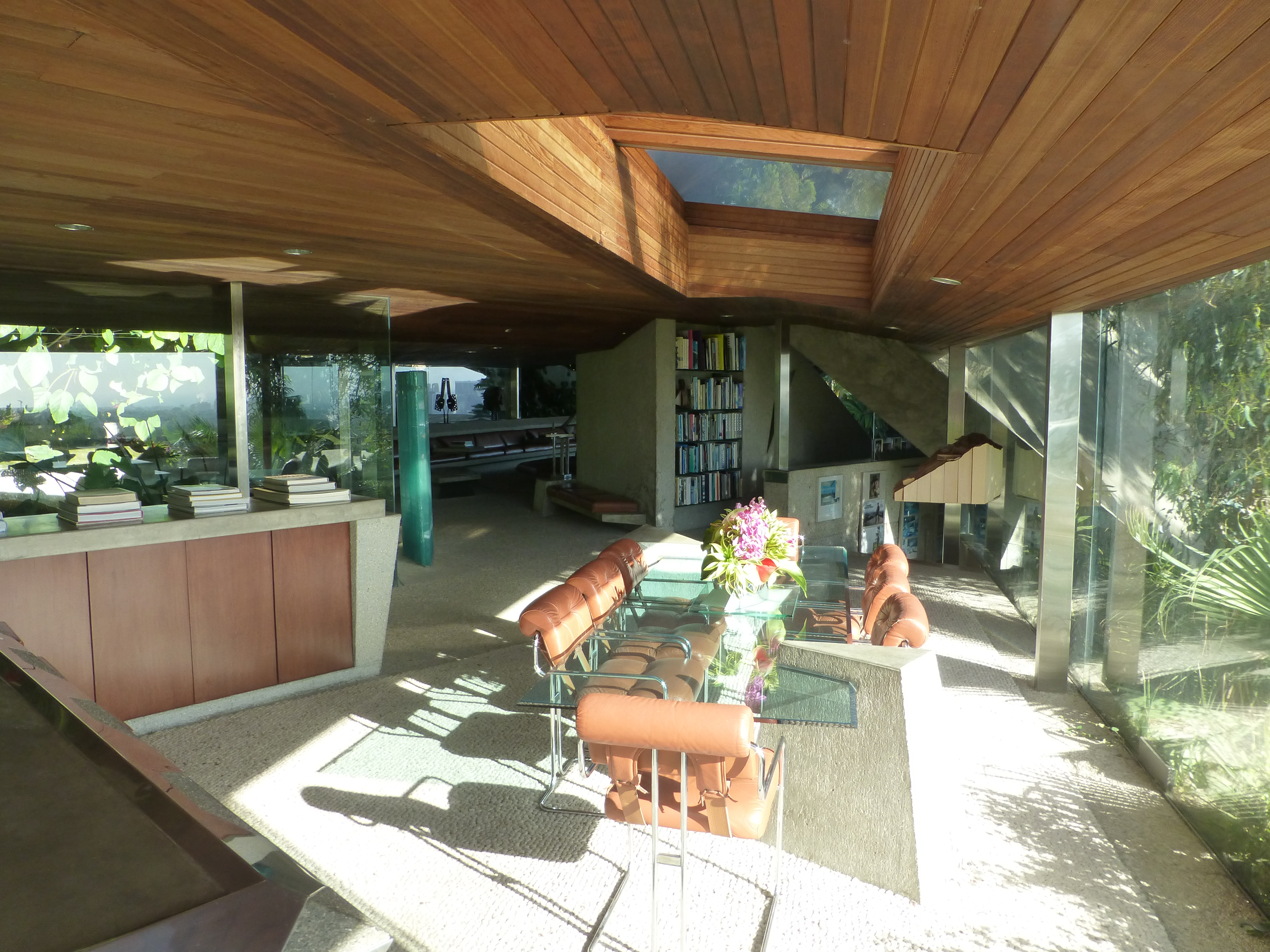
Dining area

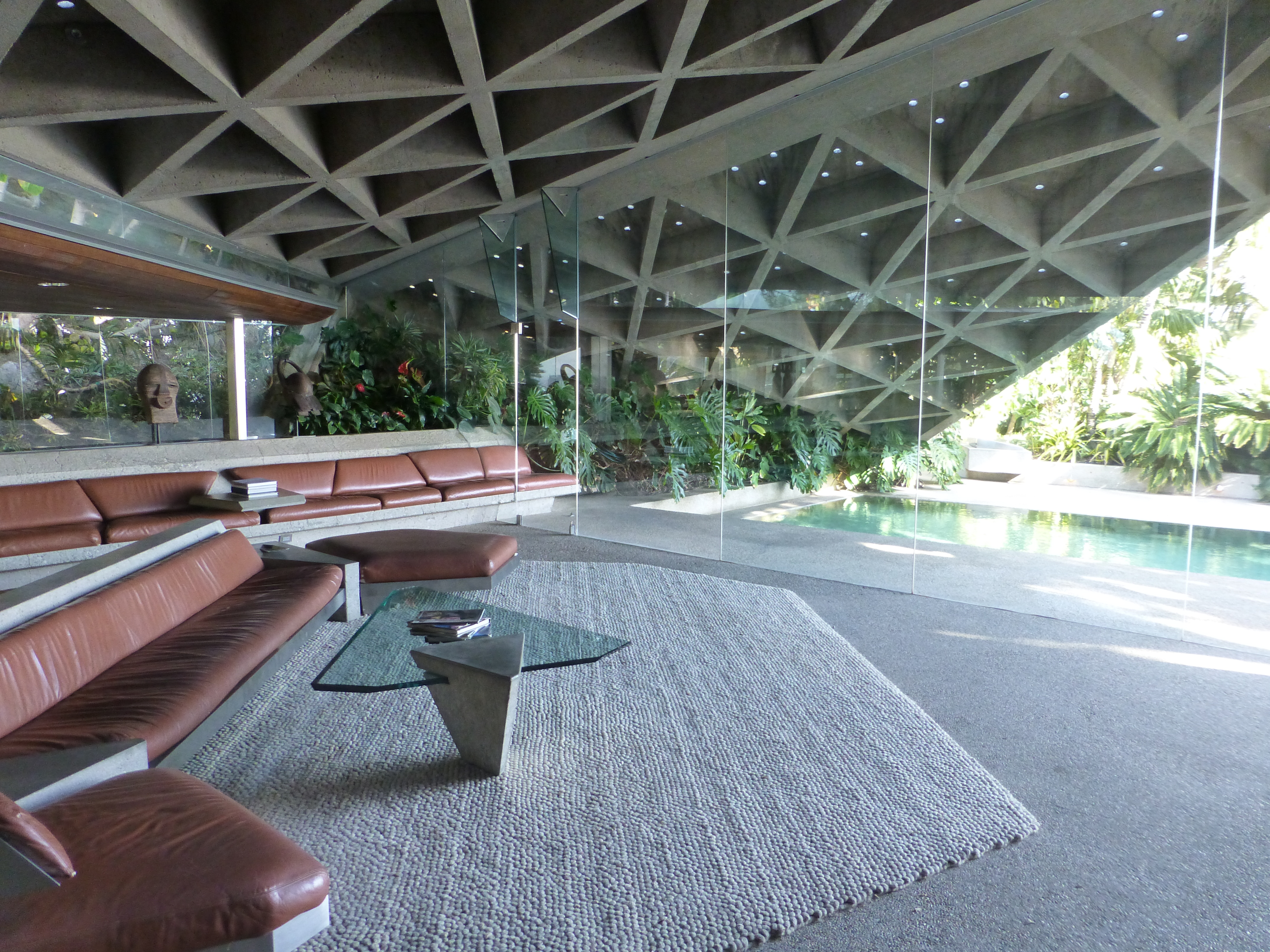
View from living room to terrace, pool

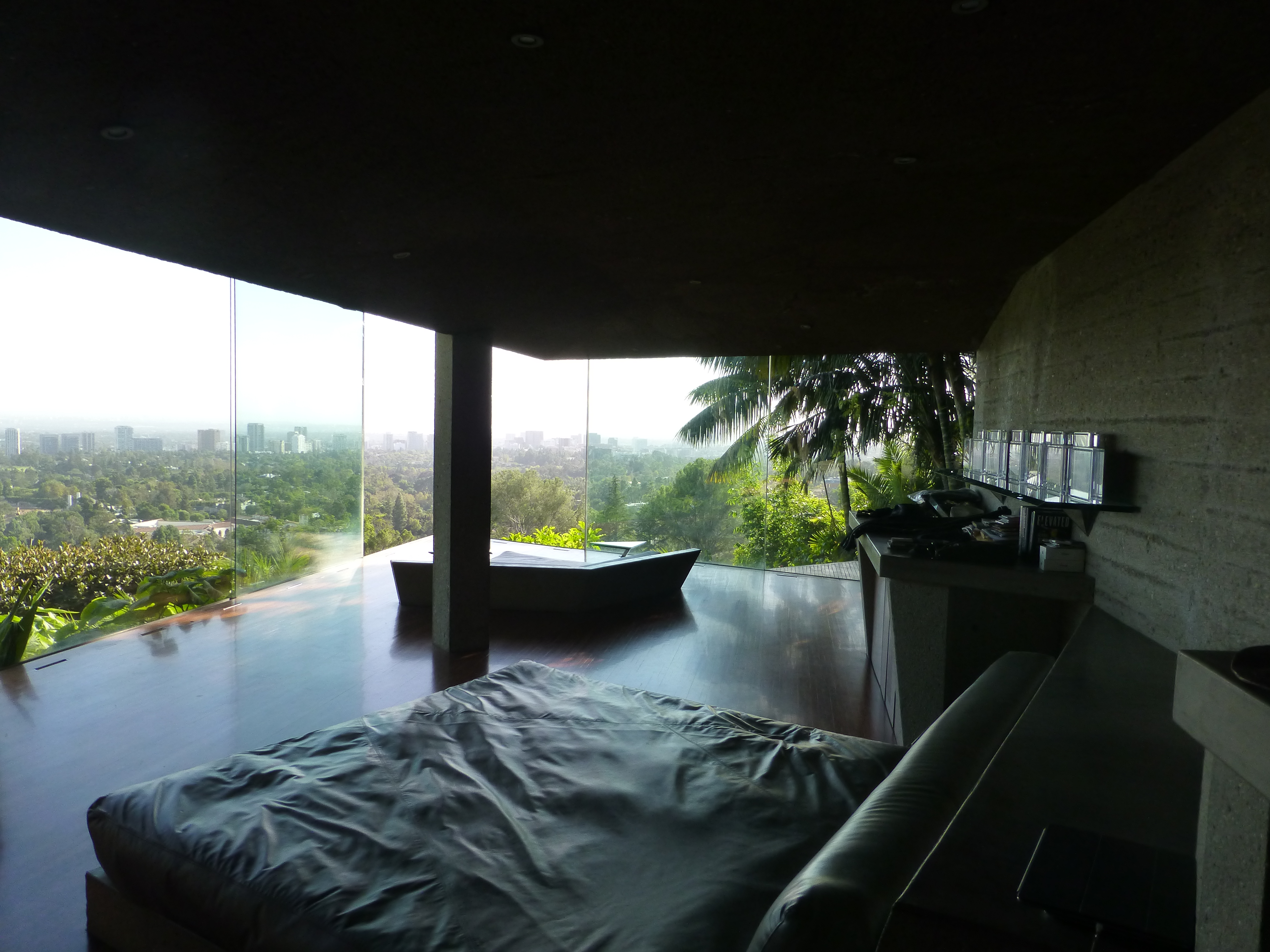
Bedroom

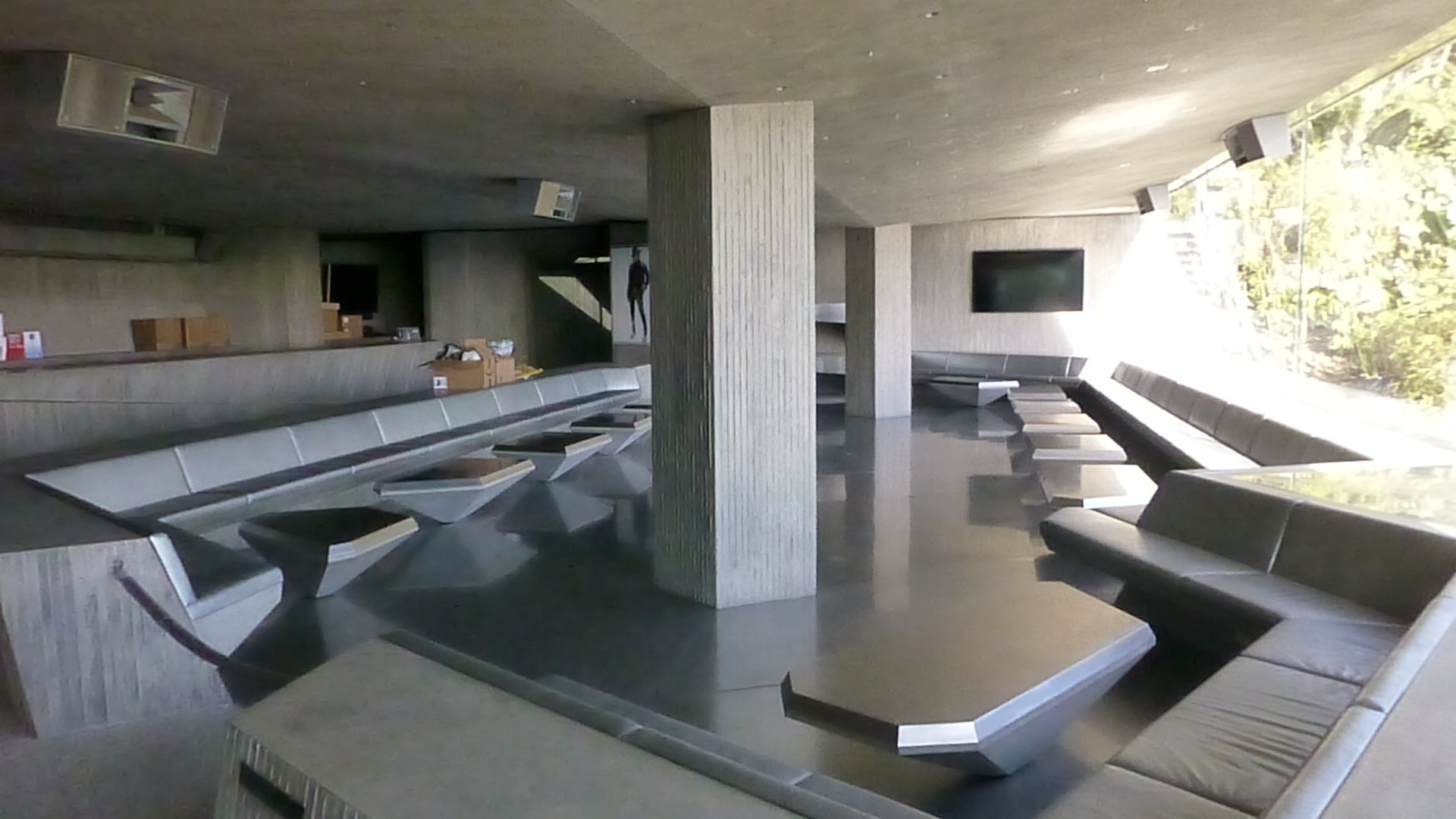
Club James

== In popular culture ==
The house has been used in several movies, television shows, commercials, music videos, and adult films.

=== Film and television ===
- Star Time (1992)
- The Big Lebowski (1998), as the house of porn magnate Jackie Treehorn
- Bandits (2001)
- Charlie's Angels: Full Throttle (2003)
- Southland (2009–2013)
- Snowfall (2017–2023)
- Selling Sunset (Season 7, Episodes 1, 2 (2023))

=== Music videos ===
- "Grapevyne" by Brownstone (1995)
- "It's All About You (Not About Me)" by Tracie Spencer (1999)
- "Have You Ever" by S Club 7 (2001)
- "Forgive" by Rebecca Lynn Howard (2002)
- "Let's Get Blown" by Snoop Dogg and Pharrell (2005)
- "Feds Watching" by 2 Chainz and Pharrell (2013)
- "The Fix" by Nelly (2015)
- "Say So" by Doja Cat (2020)

=== Adult films ===
- Captured Beauty (1995)
- Unleashed (1996)
- Possessions (1997)

=== Art and photography ===
- Actor Carel Struycken photographed the home's living room for his collection of spherical panoramas.

== General sources ==
- Hess, Alan (2003). The Architecture of John Lautner. New York: Rizzoli.
- Lautner, John (1987). John Lautner, Architect. London Zurich Munich: Artemis.
