= Pearlman Mountain Cabin =

Cottage in Idyllwild, United States

Coordinates: 33°43′50″N 116°44′28″W

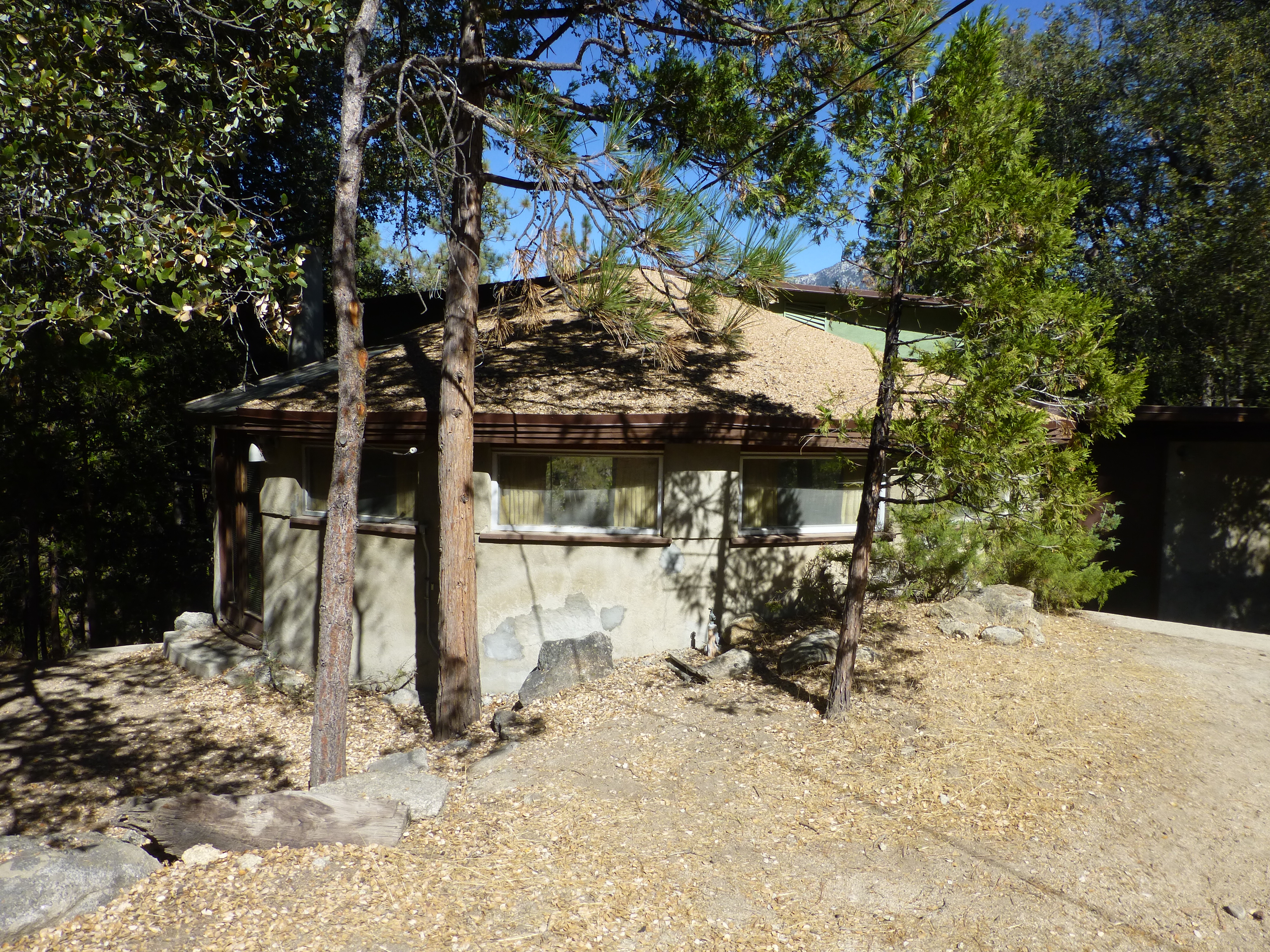
Pearlman Mountain Cabin (2019)

The Pearlman Mountain Cabin is a cottage in Idyllwild, United States. It was designed by John Lautner in 1957. It is listed in the National Register of Historic Places as "character-defining" for the architectural style of organic architecture.

== History ==
Drawing of the Pearlman Mountain Cabin

The weekend cottage was commissioned by Carl K. Pearlman, a urologist from neighbouring Orange County. The building lot was chosen by his wife Agnes. In the 1950s the area around Idyllwild was a popular hideaway among the upper middle class of Los Angeles which was just two hours away. The Pearlmans had purchased a lot that was considered to be fraught with problems: It had a slope of up to 40% and was full of rocks. Several architects refused to design and erect a weekend home on the property, but recommended John Lautner to the couple who had a reputation as an expert for unusual projects. Lautner provided a first draft of his plans in 1956, and the building started in 1957. Construction was conducted by William Branch, a brother of Agnes Pearlman.

Carl K. Pearlman died in 1998. The cabin is currently owned by his daughter Nancy.

== Design ==
Cabin layout

As many other buildings constructed by Lautner, the Pearlman Mountain Cabin is sometimes assigned as organic architecture, a term coined by Lautner's teacher Frank Lloyd Wright. The point of departure was a severely sloping forest property in the western San Jacinto Mountains at about 1800 meters altitude. Among numerous pine trees was a large boulder. Lautner decided to overbuild the boulder with a circular platform and to construct the cabin as a cylinder, its flat, overhanging roof being supported by tree trunks encircling the cabin. The valley-facing living room covers about half of the floor space of the building. Apart from the supporting tree trunks, its outer wall completely consists of glass windows that form a zigzag line roughly resembling a semi-circle. Since half of the entire wall of the building consists of glass windows the view of the visitor is automatically drawn to the landscape outside the house. Because of the large size and the unusual collocation of the windows the boundaries between inside and outside become blurred for the viewer. Towards the hillside a solid, semicircular wall with small windows confines the living room. Roof and facade have been designed to provide good acoustics inside, the trigger being that Agnes Pearlman was a talented pianist. From the cylinder-shaped living room doors lead to two annexes: A bathroom and an observation deck.
